= 2015 Colorado Rockies season =

2015 Colorado Rockies
- League: National League
- Division: West
- Ballpark: Coors Field
- City: Denver, Colorado
- Record: 68–94 (.420)
- Divisional place: 5th
- Owners: Charles & Richard Monfort
- General manager: Jeff Bridich
- Managers: Walt Weiss, Tom Runnells (interim)
- Television: Root Sports Rocky Mountain (Drew Goodman, George Frazier, Jeff Huson, Marc Stout)
- Radio: KOA (English); Colorado Rockies Radio Network (Jack Corrigan, Jerry Schemmel); KNRV (Spanish) (Tony Guevara)
- Stats: ESPN.com; Baseball Reference

The 2015 Colorado Rockies season was the franchise's 23rd in Major League Baseball. Walt Weiss returned for his third consecutive season as manager. It was the 21st season the Rockies played their home games at Coors Field.

== Offseason ==
- November 24, 2014: Juan Nicasio was traded by the Colorado Rockies to the Los Angeles Dodgers. The Los Angeles Dodgers sent Noel Cuevas (December 16, 2014) to the Colorado Rockies to complete the trade.
- December 11, 2014: Josh Rutledge was traded by the Colorado Rockies to the Los Angeles Angels of Anaheim for Jairo Diaz.
- December 16, 2014: Daniel Descalso was signed as a free agent by the Colorado Rockies.
- January 5, 2015: Nick Hundley was signed as a free agent by the Colorado Rockies.
- January 30, 2015: David Hale was traded by the Atlanta Braves with Gus Schlosser to the Colorado Rockies for José Briceño and Chris O'Dowd (minors).
- February 4, 2015: Kyle Kendrick was signed as a free agent by the Colorado Rockies.
- March 22, 2015: Jhoulys Chacín was released by the Colorado Rockies.

== Regular season ==
The Rockies played eight extra-inning games during the season, the fewest of any MLB team in 2015.

=== Season standings ===
==== National League West ====
NL West
Team	W	L	Pct.	GB	Home	Road
Los Angeles Dodgers	92	70	.568	—	55‍–‍26	37‍–‍44
San Francisco Giants	84	78	.519	8	47‍–‍34	37‍–‍44
Arizona Diamondbacks	79	83	.488	13	39‍–‍42	40‍–‍41
San Diego Padres	74	88	.457	18	39‍–‍42	35‍–‍46
Colorado Rockies	68	94	.420	24	36‍–‍45	32‍–‍49

==== National League Wild Card ====
Division leaders
Team	W	L	Pct.
St. Louis Cardinals	100	62	.617
Los Angeles Dodgers	92	70	.568
New York Mets	90	72	.556

Wild Card teams (Top 2 teams qualify for postseason)
Team	W	L	Pct.	GB
Pittsburgh Pirates	98	64	.605	+1
Chicago Cubs	97	65	.599	—
San Francisco Giants	84	78	.519	13
Washington Nationals	83	79	.512	14
Arizona Diamondbacks	79	83	.488	18
San Diego Padres	74	88	.457	23
Miami Marlins	71	91	.438	26
Milwaukee Brewers	68	94	.420	29
Colorado Rockies	68	94	.420	29
Atlanta Braves	67	95	.414	30
Cincinnati Reds	64	98	.395	33
Philadelphia Phillies	63	99	.389	34

=== Record vs. opponents ===
2015 National League record Source: MLB Standings Grid – 2015
Team	AZ	ATL	CHC	CIN	COL	LAD	MIA	MIL	NYM	PHI	PIT	SD	SF	STL	WSH	AL
Arizona	—	3–3	2–4	6–1	13–6	6–13	5–2	5–2	2–5	2–4	1–5	9–10	11–8	0–7	3–4	11–9
Atlanta	3–3	—	1–6	3–4	1–6	3–3	10–9	5–2	8–11	11–8	2–4	2–5	3–4	4–2	5–14	6–14
Chicago	4–2	6–1	—	13–6	4–2	3–4	3–3	14–5	7–0	2–5	11–8	3–3	5–2	8–11	4–3	10–10
Cincinnati	1–6	4–3	6–13	—	2–4	1–6	3–4	9–10	0–7	4–2	11–8	2–4	2–5	7–12	5–1	7–13
Colorado	6–13	6–1	2–4	4–2	—	8–11	2–5	5–1	0–7	5–2	1–6	7–12	11–8	3–4	3–3	5–15
Los Angeles	13–6	3–3	4–3	6–1	11–8	—	4–2	4–3	3–4	5–2	1–5	14–5	8–11	2–5	4–2	10–10
Miami	2–5	9–10	3–3	4–3	5–2	2–4	—	4–2	8–11	9–10	1–6	2–5	5–2	1–5	9–10	7–13
Milwaukee	2–5	2–5	5–14	10–9	1–5	3–4	2–4	—	3–3	7–0	10–9	5–2	1–5	6–13	3–4	8–12
New York	5–2	11–8	0–7	7–0	7–0	4–3	11–8	3–3	—	14–5	0–6	2–4	3–3	3–4	11–8	9–11
Philadelphia	4–2	8–11	5–2	2–4	2–5	2–5	10–9	0–7	5–14	—	2–5	5–1	1–5	2–5	7–12	8–12
Pittsburgh	5–1	4–2	8–11	8–11	6–1	5–1	6–1	9–10	6–0	5–2	—	5–2	6–1	9–10	3–4	13–7
San Diego	10–9	5–2	3–3	4–2	12–7	5–14	5–2	2–5	4–2	1–5	2–5	—	8–11	4–3	2–5	7–13
San Francisco	8–11	4–3	2–5	5–2	8–11	11–8	2–5	5–1	3–3	5–1	1–6	11–8	—	2–4	4–3	13–7
St. Louis	7–0	2–4	11–8	12–7	4–3	5–2	5–1	13–6	4–3	5–2	10–9	3–4	4–2	—	4–2	11–9
Washington	4–3	14–5	3–4	1–5	3–3	2–4	10–9	4–3	8–11	12–7	4–3	5–2	3–4	2–4	—	8–12

=== Transactions ===
- July 28, 2015: Troy Tulowitzki was traded with LaTroy Hawkins to the Toronto Blue Jays for José Reyes, Miguel Castro, Jeff Hoffman, and Jesús Tinoco.
- August 20, 2015: Drew Stubbs was released by the Colorado Rockies.
- August 27, 2015: Rafael Betancourt was released by the Colorado Rockies.

=== Major League Debuts ===
- Batters
  - Dustin Garneau (Aug 20)
  - Tom Murphy (Sep 12)
- Pitchers
  - Scott Oberg (Apr 14)
  - Ken Roberts (May 3)
  - Jon Gray (Aug 4)
  - Jason Gurka (Aug 29)

== Roster ==
2015 Colorado Rockies
**Roster**
**Pitchers**: 66 John Axford; 36 Christian Bergman; 63 Rafael Betancourt; 35 Chad Bettis; 49 Rex Brothers; 51 Brooks Brown; 31 Eddie Butler; 46 Miguel Castro; 64 Simón Castro; 29 Jorge de la Rosa; 47 Jairo Díaz; 58 Yohan Flande; 53 Christian Friedrich; 62 Gonzalez Germen; 55 Jon Gray; 65 Jason Gurka; 61 David Hale; 32 LaTroy Hawkins; 54 Tommy Kahnle; 38 Kyle Kendrick; 34 Aaron Laffey; 48 Boone Logan; 24 Jordan Lyles; 15 Tyler Matzek; 60 Justin Miller; 45 Scott Oberg; 0 Adam Ottavino; 67 Ken Roberts; 62 Jorge Rondón; 52 Chris Rusin	**Catchers**: 50 Dustin Garneau; 4 Nick Hundley; 8 Michael McKenry; 30 Tom Murphy; **Infielders**: 18 Cristhian Adames; 28 Nolan Arenado; 3 Daniel Descalso; 9 DJ LeMahieu; 33 Justin Morneau; 10 Ben Paulsen; 7 José Reyes; 20 Wilin Rosario; 2 Troy Tulowitzki; 43 Rafael Ynoa; **Outfielders**: 1 Brandon Barnes; 19 Charlie Blackmon; 6 Corey Dickerson; 5 Carlos González; 12 Matt McBride; 16 Kyle Parker; 13 Drew Stubbs	**Manager**: 22 Walt Weiss; **Coaches**: 68 Pat Burgess (bullpen catcher); 9 Vinny Castilla (special asst.); 39 Stu Cole (third base); 25 Blake Doyle (hitting); 56 Steve Foster (pitching); 40 Darren Holmes (bullpen); 14 Rene Lachemann (catching); 11 Tom Runnells (bench); 21 Eric Young (first base)

=== Game log ===
Legend
	Rockies win
	Rockies loss
	Postponement
**Bold**	Rockies team member

2015 Game Log
April (11–10)

#	Date	Opponent	Score	Win	Loss	Save	Attendance	Record
1	April 6	@ Brewers	10–0	**Kendrick** (1–0)	Lohse (0–1)		46,032	1–0
2	April 7	@ Brewers	5–2	**Lyles** (1–0)	Garza (0–1)	**Hawkins** (1)	30,222	2–0
3	April 8	@ Brewers	5–4 (10)	**Hawkins** (1–0)	Rodríguez (0–1)	**Axford** (1)	28,720	3–0
4	April 10	Cubs	5–1	**Bergman** (1–0)	Wood (0–1)		49,303	4–0
5	April 11	Cubs	9–5	Hammel (1–0)	**Kendrick** (1–1)		43,812	4–1
6	April 12	Cubs	6–5	Ramirez (1–0)	**Hawkins** (1–1)	Rondón (2)	41,363	4–2
7	April 13	@ Giants	2–0	**Butler** (1–0)	Heston (1–1)	**Betancourt** (1)	42,019	5–2
8	April 14	@ Giants	4–1	**Oberg** (1–0)	Hudson (0–1)	**Ottavino** (1)	41,051	6–2
9	April 15	@ Giants	4–2	**Matzek** (1–0)	Lincecum (0–1)	**Ottavino** (2)	41,188	7–2
10	April 17	@ Dodgers	7–3	Kershaw (1–1)	**Kendrick** (1–2)		48,950	7–3
11	April 18	@ Dodgers	6–3	Greinke (2–0)	**Lyles** (1–1)	Peralta (3)	45,912	7–4
12	April 19	@ Dodgers	7–0	McCarthy (2–0)	**Butler** (1–1)		44,666	7–5
13	April 20	Padres	14–3	Despaigne (2–0)	**de la Rosa** (0–1)		22,586	7–6
14	April 21	Padres	7–6	Maurer (1–0)	**Logan** (0–1)	Kimbrel (5)	22,600	7–7
15	April 22	Padres	5–4	**Ottavino** (1–0)	Kelley (0–2)		22,705	8–7
16	April 23	Padres	2–1	**Lyles** (2–1)	Ross (1–1)	**Axford** (2)	31,672	9–7
17	April 24	Giants	6–4	**Butler** (2–1)	Heston (2–2)	**Ottavino** (3)	31,453	10–7
18	April 25	Giants	5–4 (11)	Machi (1–0)	**Brown** (0–1)		36,474	10–8
–	April 26	Giants	Postponed (rain) Rescheduled for May 23					
19	April 27	@ Diamondbacks	5–4	**Matzek** (2–0)	Anderson (0–1)	**Axford** (3)	17,444	11–8
20	April 28	@ Diamondbacks	12–5	Chafin (1–0)	**Kendrick** (1–3)		18,792	11–9
21	April 29	@ Diamondbacks	9–1	Collmenter (2–3)	**Lyles** (2–2)		19,633	11–10

May (11–16)

#	Date	Opponent	Score	Win	Loss	Save	Attendance	Record
22	May 1	@ Padres	14–3	Kennedy (1–1)	**Butler** (2–2)		30,186	11–11
23	May 2	@ Padres	4–2	Morrow (2–0)	**de la Rosa** (0–2)	Kimbrel (7)	28,058	11–12
24	May 3	@ Padres	8–6	Shields (3–0)	**Kendrick** (1–4)	Kimbrel (8)	34,197	11–13
–	May 4	Diamondbacks	Postponed (rain) Rescheduled for September 1					
–	May 5	Diamondbacks	Postponed (rain) Rescheduled for May 6					
25	May 6	Diamondbacks	13–7	Collmenter (3–3)	**Matzek** (2–1)		22,621	11–14
26	May 6	Diamondbacks	5–1	Ray (1–0)	**Lyles** (2–3)		22,621	11–15
27	May 8	Dodgers	2–1 (5)	Anderson (2–1)	**Butler** (2–3)		32,974	11–16
–	May 9	Dodgers	Postponed (rain/snow) Rescheduled for June 2					
28	May 10	Dodgers	9–5	Báez (1–0)	**Oberg** (1–1)		30,710	11–17
29	May 12	@ Angels	5–2	Wilson (2–2)	**Betancourt** (0–1)	Street (11)	28,150	11–18
30	May 13	@ Angels	2–1 (11)	Ramos (2–0)	**Friedrich** (0–1)		30,129	11–19
31	May 14	@ Dodgers	5–4	**Betancourt** (1–1)	García (2–1)	**Axford** (4)	42,650	12–19
32	May 15	@ Dodgers	6–4	Kershaw (2–2)	**Butler** (2–4)	Nicasio (1)	46,662	12–20
33	May 16	@ Dodgers	7–1	**de la Rosa** (1–2)	Greinke (5–1)		48,378	13–20
34	May 17	@ Dodgers	1–0	Bolsinger (2–0)	**Kendrick** (1–5)	Jansen (1)	44,990	13–21
35	May 18	Phillies	4–3	Hamels (4–3)	**Lyles** (2–4)	Papelbon (10)	24,061	13–22
36	May 19	Phillies	6–5	**Oberg** (2–1)	De Fratus (0–1)	**Axford** (5)	21,249	14–22
37	May 20	Phillies	4–2	González (2–1)	**Butler** (2–5)	Papelbon (11)	21,714	14–23
38	May 21	Phillies	7–3	**Bergman** (2–0)	Williams (3–4)		25,418	15–23
39	May 22	Giants	11–8	Vogelsong (3–2)	**Kendrick** (1–6)	Casilla (11)	31,226	15–24
40	May 23	Giants	10–8	Heston (4–3)	**Lyles** (2–5)	Casilla (12)	32,956	15–25
41	May 23	Giants	5–3	**Hale** (1–0)	Petit (1–1)	**Axford** (6)	30,180	16–25
42	May 24	Giants	11–2	**Bettis** (1–0)	Hudson (2–4)		34,404	17–25
43	May 25	@ Reds	5–4	**Betancourt** (2–1)	Chapman (2–3)	**Axford** (7)	20,516	18–25
44	May 26	@ Reds	2–1	Chapman (3–3)	**Brown** (0–2)		22,523	18–26
45	May 27	@ Reds	6–4	**Kendrick** (2–6)	Leake (2–4)	**Axford** (8)	23,917	19–26
46	May 29	@ Phillies	4–1	**Bettis** (2–0)	Hamels (5–4)		22,227	20–26
47	May 30	@ Phillies	5–2	**Butler** (3–5)	Harang (4–5)	**Axford** (9)	23,510	21–26
48	May 31	@ Phillies	4–1	**Rusin** (1–0)	Williams (3–5)	**Oberg** (1)	22,166	22–26

June (12–17)

#	Date	Opponent	Score	Win	Loss	Save	Attendance	Record
49	June 1	Dodgers	11–4	Kershaw (4–3)	**Kendrick** (2–7)		25,564	22–27
50	June 2	Dodgers	6–3	**de la Rosa** (2–2)	Thomas (0–1)	**Axford** (10)	28,148	23–27
51	June 2	Dodgers	9–8	Ravin (1–0)	**Betancourt** (2–2)	Jansen (5)	24,972	23–28
52	June 3	Dodgers	7–6	**Axford** (1–0)	García (2–2)		24,575	24–28
53	June 5	Marlins	6–2	Koehler (4–3)	**Butler** (3–6)	Ramos (6)	32,091	24–29
54	June 6	Marlins	10–5	**Rusin** (2–0)	Phelps (2–3)		30,373	25–29
55	June 7	Marlins	3–2 (10)	Dyson (3–2)	**Logan** (0–2)	Ramos (7)	35,139	25–30
56	June 8	Cardinals	11–3	**Hale** (2–0)	Lackey (4–4)		32,043	26–30
57	June 9	Cardinals	4–3	**de la Rosa** (3–2)	Wacha (8–2)	**Axford** (11)	33,731	27–30
58	June 10	Cardinals	4–2	Martínez (7–2)	**Bettis** (2–1)	Rosenthal (20)	30,698	27–31
59	June 11	@ Marlins	6–0	Phelps (3–3)	**Rusin** (2–1)		18,003	27–32
60	June 12	@ Marlins	5–1	Ureña (1–2)	**Kendrick** (2–8)		20,355	27–33
61	June 13	@ Marlins	4–1	Latos (2–4)	**Hale** (2–1)	Ramos (8)	26,647	27–34
62	June 14	@ Marlins	4–1	**de la Rosa** (4–2)	Haren (6–3)	**Axford** (12)	20,879	28–34
63	June 15	@ Astros	6–3	Keuchel (8–2)	**Bettis** (2–2)	Gregerson (16)	21,820	28–35
64	June 16	@ Astros	8–5	Harris (3–0)	**Rusin** (2–2)	Gregerson (17)	22,245	28–36
65	June 17	Astros	8–4	Oberholtzer (2–1)	**Kendrick** (2–9)		33,041	28–37
66	June 18	Astros	8–4	McHugh (7–3)	**Hale** (2–2)		30,770	28–38
67	June 19	Brewers	9–5	Jungmann (2–1)	**de la Rosa** (4–3)		35,841	28–39
68	June 20	Brewers	5–1	**Bettis** (3–2)	Lohse (3–9)		35,180	29–39
69	June 21	Brewers	10–4	**Rusin** (3–2)	Garza (4–9)		41,487	30–39
70	June 23	Diamondbacks	10–5	**Kendrick** (3–9)	Anderson (3–2)		30,079	31–39
71	June 24	Diamondbacks	8–7	Hudson (2–2)	**Axford** (1–1)	Ziegler (11)	30,367	31–40
72	June 25	Diamondbacks	6–4	**Miller** (1–0)	Hudson (2–3)	**Axford** (13)	30,568	32–40
73	June 26	@ Giants	8–6	**Bettis** (4–2)	Hudson (5–7)		41,887	33–40
74	June 27	@ Giants	7–5	Kontos (2–0)	**Betancourt** (2–3)	Casilla (20)	41,746	33–41
75	June 28	@ Giants	6–3	Bumgarner (8–4)	**Kendrick** (3–10)	Casilla (21)	41,795	33–42
76	June 29	@ Athletics	7–1	Graveman (5–4)	**Hale** (2–3)		12,125	33–43
77	June 30	@ Athletics	2–1	**de la Rosa** (5–3)	Bassitt (0–1)	**Hawkins** (2)	19,206	34–43

July (9–15)

#	Date	Opponent	Score	Win	Loss	Save	Attendance	Record
78	July 1	@ Athletics	4–1	Hahn (6–6)	**Bettis** (4–3)	Clippard (14)	17,655	34–44
79	July 2	@ Diamondbacks	8–1	Hellickson (6–5)	**Rusin** (3–3)		16,861	34–45
80	July 3	@ Diamondbacks	4–3 (10)	Chafin (5–0)	**Flande** (0–1)		22,449	34–46
81	July 4	@ Diamondbacks	7–3	Corbin (1–0)	**Hale** (2–4)		42,113	34–47
82	July 5	@ Diamondbacks	6–4	**de la Rosa** (6–3)	De La Rosa (6–4)	**Axford** (14)	22,996	35–47
83	July 7	Angels	10–2	Heaney (2–0)	**Bettis** (4–4)		26,232	35–48
84	July 8	Angels	3–2	Smith (3–2)	**Axford** (1–2)	Street (24)	24,660	35–49
85	July 9	Braves	5–3	**Hale** (3–4)	Brigham (0–1)	**Axford** (15)	30,334	36–49
86	July 10	Braves	5–3	**Laffey** (1–0)	Miller (5–5)	**Axford** (16)	48,254	37–49
87	July 11	Braves	3–2	**Hawkins** (2–1)	Grilli (3–4)		40,620	38–49
88	July 12	Braves	11–3	**Bettis** (5–4)	Wood (6–6)		37,047	39–49
89	July 17	@ Padres	4–2	Shields (8–3)	**de la Rosa** (6–4)	Kimbrel (24)	31,025	39–50
90	July 18	@ Padres	5–4	Maurer (6–2)	**Friedrich** (0–2)	Kimbrel (25)	32,245	39–51
–	July 19	@ Padres	Postponed (rain) Rescheduled for September 10					
91	July 20	Rangers	8–7	**Axford** (2–2)	Scheppers (3–1)		35,027	40–51
92	July 21	Rangers	9–0	Harrison (1–1)	**Kendrick** (3–11)		43,012	40–52
93	July 22	Rangers	10–8	Scheppers (4–1)	**Axford** (2–3)	Tolleson (15)	33,348	40–53
94	July 24	Reds	6–5	**Axford** (3–3)	Mattheus (1–2)		37,184	41–53
95	July 25	Reds	5–2	Cueto (7–6)	**Rusin** (3–4)	Chapman (20)	41,998	41–54
96	July 26	Reds	17–7	**Kendrick** (4–11)	Lorenzen (3–5)		46,828	42–54
97	July 27	@ Cubs	9–8	Soriano (1–0)	**Axford** (3–4)		35,070	42–55
98	July 28	@ Cubs	7–2	**Flande** (1–1)	Beeler (1–1)		36,747	43–55
99	July 29	@ Cubs	3–2	Lester (6–8)	**Butler** (3–7)	Rondón (13)	38,874	43–56
100	July 30	@ Cardinals	9–8	Villanueva (4–3)	**Axford** (3–5)		43,518	43–57
101	July 31	@ Cardinals	7–0	Wacha (12–4)	**Kendrick** (4–12)		42,568	43–58

August (10–18)

#	Date	Opponent	Score	Win	Loss	Save	Attendance	Record
102	August 1	@ Cardinals	6–2	**de la Rosa** (7–4)	Lynn (8–6)		45,216	44–58
103	August 2	@ Cardinals	3–2	Rosenthal (2–2)	**Oberg** (2–2)		44,743	44–59
104	August 3	Mariners	8–7	Hernández (13–6)	**Butler** (3–8)	Smith (10)	33,107	44–60
105	August 4	Mariners	10–4	Rasmussen (1–0)	**Friedrich** (0–3)		34,376	44–61
106	August 5	Mariners	7–5 (11)	**Flande** (2–0)	Guaipe (0–3)		30,196	45–61
107	August 7	@ Nationals	5–4	**Oberg** (3–2)	Storen (2–1)	**Kahnle** (1)	33,622	46–61
108	August 8	@ Nationals	6–1	Strasburg (6–5)	**Butler** (3–9)		37,115	46–62
109	August 9	@ Nationals	6–4	**Axford** (4–5)	Storen (2–2)	**Kahnle** (2)	33,157	47–62
110	August 10	@ Mets	4–2	Niese (7–9)	**Miller** (1–1)	Familia (31)	27,194	47–63
111	August 11	@ Mets	4–0	Harvey (11–7)	**Rusin** (3–5)		25,611	47–64
112	August 12	@ Mets	3–0	deGrom (11–6)	**de la Rosa** (7–5)	Familia (32)	37,175	47–65
113	August 13	@ Mets	12–3	Syndergaard (7–6)	**Butler** (3–10)		36,573	47–66
114	August 14	Padres	9–5	Norris (3–9)	**Roberts** (0–1)		33,697	47–67
115	August 15	Padres	7–5	Quackenbush (2–2)	**Kahnle** (0–1)	Kimbrel (33)	37,554	47–68
116	August 16	Padres	5–0	**Rusin** (4–5)	Kennedy (7–11)		28,927	48–68
117	August 18	Nationals	15–6	Zimmermann (9–8)	**Miller** (1–2)		24,320	48–69
118	August 19	Nationals	4–1	Strasburg (7–6)	**Betancourt** (2–4)	Papelbon (20)	24,863	48–70
119	August 20	Nationals	3–2	**Flande** (3–1)	Scherzer (11–10)	**Axford** (17)	25,211	49–70
120	August 21	Mets	14–9	Gilmartin (2–1)	**Friedrich** (0–4)		31,079	49–71
121	August 22	Mets	14–9	Niese (8–9)	**Rusin** (4–6)		46,170	49–72
122	August 23	Mets	5–1	Verrett (1–1)	**Hale** (3–5)		33,200	49–73
123	August 24	@ Braves	5–3	Teherán (9–6)	**de la Rosa** (7–6)	Vizcaíno (4)	13,920	49–74
124	August 25	@ Braves	5–1	**Bettis** (6–4)	Foltynewicz (4–6)		13,863	50–74
125	August 26	@ Braves	6–3	**S. Castro** (1–0)	Miller (5–11)	**Axford** (18)	18,328	51–74
126	August 28	@ Pirates	5–3	Watson (3–1)	**Oberg** (3–3)	Melancon (42)	32,607	51–75
127	August 29	@ Pirates	4–3	Happ (7–7)	**Rusin** (4–7)	Melancon (43)	35,838	51–76
128	August 30	@ Pirates	5–0	**de la Rosa** (8–6)	Morton (8–6)		36,271	52–76
129	August 31	Diamondbacks	5–4	**S. Castro** (2–0)	Ziegler (0–3)		21,386	53–76

September (13–16)

#	Date	Opponent	Score	Win	Loss	Save	Attendance	Record
130	September 1	Diamondbacks	6–4	Corbin (4–3)	**M. Castro** (0–3)	Hudson (3)	21,550	53–77
131	September 1	Diamondbacks	5–3	De La Rosa (12–6)	**Oberg** (3–4)	Collmenter (1)	20,411	53–78
132	September 2	Diamondbacks	9–4	**Brown** (1–2)	Delgado (5–4)	**Miller** (1)	20.574	54–78
133	September 3	Giants	11–3	**Rusin** (5–7)	Vogelsong (9–11)		25,863	55–78
134	September 4	Giants	2–1	**de la Rosa** (9–6)	Heston (11–9)	**Axford** (19)	29,196	56–78
135	September 5	Giants	7–3	Peavy (5–6)	**Bettis** (6–5)		37,672	56–79
136	September 6	Giants	7–4	Bumgarner (17–7)	**Flande** (3–2)	Casilla (32)	36,649	56–80
137	September 7	@ Padres	6–4	**Kendrick** (5–12)	Kennedy (8–13)	**Axford** (20)	24,585	57–80
138	September 8	@ Padres	2–1	Kimbrel (2–2)	**Logan** (0–3)		19,112	57–81
139	September 9	@ Padres	11–4	Shields (11–6)	**Rusin** (5–8)		22,764	57–82
140	September 10	@ Padres	4–3	**Miller** (2–2)	Benoit (6–5)	**Axford** (21)	21,922	58–82
141	September 11	@ Mariners	4–2	**Bettis** (7–5)	Iwakuma (7–4)	**Axford** (22)	19,876	59–82
142	September 12	@ Mariners	7–2	Elías (5–8)	**Flande** (3–3)		24,743	59–83
143	September 13	@ Mariners	3–2	**Kendrick** (6–12)	Paxton (3–4)	**Axford** (23)	21,840	60–83
144	September 14	@ Dodgers	4–1	Kershaw (14–6)	**Gray** (0–1)	Hatcher (3)	43,731	60–84
145	September 15	@ Dodgers	5–4 (16)	**Hale** (4–5)	Latos (4–10)	**Germen** (1)	45,311	61–84
146	September 16	@ Dodgers	2–0	Wood (11–10)	**de la Rosa** (9–7)	Jansen (32)	45,906	61–85
147	September 18	Padres	7–4	**Bettis** (8–5)	Kennedy (8–15)	**Axford** (24)	27,303	62–85
148	September 19	Padres	10–2	**Bergman** (3–0)	Erlin (0–1)		30,875	63–85
149	September 20	Padres	10–4	Shields (13–6)	**Kendrick** (6–13)		26,927	63–86
150	September 21	Pirates	9–3	Burnett (9–5)	**Gray** (0–2)		23,187	63–87
151	September 22	Pirates	6–3	Happ (10–8)	**Rusin** (5–9)	Melancon (49)	23,433	63–88
152	September 23	Pirates	13–7	Blanton (6–2)	**Bergman** (3–1)		23,526	63–89
153	September 24	Pirates	5–4	Blanton (7–2)	**Díaz** (0–1)	Melancon (50)	25,164	63–90
154	September 25	Dodgers	7–4	**Hale** (5–5)	Bolsinger (6–5)	**Axford** (25)	38,485	64–90
155	September 26	Dodgers	8–6	**Miller** (3–2)	García (3–4)		40,322	65–90
156	September 27	Dodgers	12–5	**Rusin** (6–9)	Wood (11–12)		32,870	66–90
157	September 29	@ Diamondbacks	4–3 (11)	Delgado (7–4)	**Brown** (1–3)		21,526	66–91
158	September 30	@ Diamondbacks	3–1	Delgado (8–4)	**Bettis** (8–6)	Hudson (4)	18,529	66–92

October (2–2)

#	Date	Opponent	Score	Win	Loss	Save	Attendance	Record
159	October 1	@ Diamondbacks	8–6	Burgos (2–2)	**Miller** (3–3)	Bracho (1)	20,826	66–93
160	October 2	@ Giants	9–3	**Kendrick** (7–13)	Heston (12–11)		41,505	67–93
161	October 3	@ Giants	3–2	Peavy (8–6)	**Rusin** (6–10)	Casilla (38)	41,398	67–94
162	October 4	@ Giants	7–3	**Brothers** (1–0)	Kontos (4–4)		41,399	68–94

== Player stats ==
= Indicates team leader

=== Batting ===
==== Starters by position ====
Note: Pos = Position; G = Games played; AB = At bats; H = Hits; Avg. = Batting average; HR = Home runs; RBI = Runs batted in

Pos	Player	G	AB	H	Avg.	HR	RBI
C	Nick Hundley	103	366	110	.301	10	43
1B	Ben Paulsen	116	325	90	.277	11	49
2B	DJ LeMahieu	150	564	170	.301	6	61
SS	Troy Tulowitzki	87	323	97	.300	12	53
3B	Nolan Arenado	157	616	177	.287	42	130
LF	Brandon Barnes	106	255	64	.251	2	17
CF	Charlie Blackmon	157	614	176	.287	17	58
RF	Carlos González	153	554	150	.271	40	97

==== Other batters ====
Note: G = Games played; AB = At bats; H = Hits; Avg. = Batting average; HR = Home runs; RBI = Runs batted in

Player	G	AB	H	Avg.	HR	RBI
Wilin Rosario	87	231	62	.268	6	29
Corey Dickerson	65	224	68	.304	10	31
José Reyes	47	193	50	.259	3	19
Daniel Descalso	101	185	38	.205	5	22
Justin Morneau	49	168	52	.310	3	15
Michael McKenry	58	127	26	.205	4	17
Rafael Ynoa	72	127	33	.260	0	9
Kyle Parker	46	106	19	.179	3	11
Drew Stubbs	51	102	22	.216	5	10
Dustin Garneau	22	70	11	.157	2	8
Cristhian Adames	26	53	13	.245	0	3
Matt McBride	20	42	7	.167	0	0
Tom Murphy	11	35	9	.257	3	9

=== Pitching ===
==== Starting pitchers ====
Note: G = Games pitched; IP = Innings pitched; W = Wins; L = Losses; ERA = Earned run average; SO = Strikeouts

Player	G	IP	W	L	ERA	SO
Jorge De La Rosa	26	149.0	9	7	4.17	134
Kyle Kendrick	27	142.1	7	13	6.32	80
Chris Rusin	24	131.2	6	10	5.33	86
Chad Bettis	20	115.0	8	6	4.23	98
Eddie Butler	16	79.1	3	10	5.90	44
David Hale	17	78.1	5	5	6.09	61
Jordan Lyles	10	49.0	2	5	5.14	30
Jon Gray	9	40.2	0	2	5.53	40
Tyler Matzek	5	22.0	2	1	4.09	15

Note: There is no ERA leader (qualifier) for team because no pitcher pitched 1 inning per scheduled game (162 innings).

==== Other pitchers ====
Note: G = Games pitched; IP = Innings pitched; W = Wins; L = Losses; ERA = Earned run average; SO = Strikeouts

Player	G	IP	W	L	ERA	SO
Christian Bergman	30	68.1	3	1	4.74	37
Yohan Flande	19	68.1	3	3	4.74	43

==== Relief pitchers ====
Note: G = Games pitched; W = Wins; L = Losses; SV = Saves; ERA = Earned run average; SO = Strikeouts

Player	G	W	L	SV	ERA	SO
John Axford	60	4	5	25	4.20	62
Christian Friedrich	68	0	4	0	5.25	45
Scott Oberg	64	3	4	1	5.09	44
Boone Logan	60	0	3	0	4.33	44
Rafael Betancourt	45	2	4	1	6.18	40
Tommy Kahnle	36	0	1	2	4.86	39
Brooks Brown	36	1	3	0	4.91	20
Justin Miller	34	3	3	1	4.05	38
Gonzalez Germen	29	0	0	1	3.86	25
LaTroy Hawkins	24	2	1	2	3.63	20
Jairo Diaz	21	0	1	0	2.37	18
Rex Brothers	17	1	0	0	1.74	5
Simón Castro	11	2	0	0	6.10	9
Adam Ottavino	10	1	0	3	0.00	13
Ken Roberts	9	0	1	0	5.79	5
Jason Gurka	9	0	0	0	9.39	7
Miguel Castro	5	0	1	0	10.13	6
Aaron Laffey	3	1	0	0	3.68	3
Jorge Rondón	2	0	0	0	90.00	1

== Awards and accomplishments ==
- MLB Franchise Four selections for Colorado Rockies:
  - Andrés Galarraga (1B)
  - Todd Helton (1B)
  - Troy Tulowitzki (SS)
  - Larry Walker (RF)

== Farm system ==
Level	Team	League	Manager
AAA	Albuquerque Isotopes	Pacific Coast League	Glenallen Hill
AA	New Britain Rock Cats	Eastern League	Darin Everson
A	Modesto Nuts	California League	Fred Ocasio
A	Asheville Tourists	South Atlantic League	Warren Schaeffer
A-Short Season	Boise Hawks	Northwest League	Frank Gonzales
Rookie	Grand Junction Rockies	Pioneer League	Anthony Sanders

Records
Preceded by 2014	Colorado Rockies seasons 2015	Succeeded by 2016
