= 2014 Colorado Rockies season =

2014 Colorado Rockies
- League: National League
- Division: West
- Ballpark: Coors Field
- City: Denver, Colorado
- Record: 66–96 (.407)
- Divisional place: 4th
- Owners: Charles & Richard Monfort
- General manager: Dan O'Dowd
- Manager: Walt Weiss
- Television: Root Sports Rocky Mountain (Drew Goodman, George Frazier, Jeff Huson)
- Radio: KOA (English) (Jack Corrigan, Jerry Schemmel); KNRV (Spanish) (Tony Guevara)
- Stats: ESPN.com; Baseball Reference

The 2014 Colorado Rockies season was the franchise's 22nd in Major League Baseball. Beset by injuries to key players, the team finished with a 66–96 regular season record despite a strong start to the season, placing fourth in the National League West. Walt Weiss returned for his second season as the Rockies' manager for the 2014 season.

== Offseason ==
=== Roster moves ===
- November 21, 2013: LaTroy Hawkins was signed as a free agent by the Colorado Rockies.
- December 3, 2013: Dexter Fowler was traded by the Colorado Rockies with a player to be named later to the Houston Astros for Brandon Barnes and Jordan Lyles.
- December 10, 2013: Brett Anderson was traded by the Oakland Athletics to the Colorado Rockies for Drew Pomeranz and Chris Jensen (minors).
- December 12, 2013: Tommy Kahnle was drafted by the Colorado Rockies from the New York Yankees in the 2013 Rule 5 draft.
- December 13, 2013: Justin Morneau was signed as a free agent by the Colorado Rockies.
- December 16, 2013: Boone Logan was signed as a free agent by the Colorado Rockies.
- December 18, 2013: Jonathan Herrera was traded by the Colorado Rockies to the Boston Red Sox for Franklin Morales and Chris Martin.
- December 18, 2013: Josh Outman was traded by the Colorado Rockies to the Cleveland Indians for Drew Stubbs.

=== Spring training ===
The Rockies played their spring training games in the Cactus League. They finished with a 15–14 win–loss record, which does not include 4 tie games.

== Regular season ==
=== Season standings ===
==== National League West ====
NL West
Team	W	L	Pct.	GB	Home	Road
Los Angeles Dodgers	94	68	.580	—	45‍–‍36	49‍–‍32
San Francisco Giants	88	74	.543	6	45‍–‍36	43‍–‍38
San Diego Padres	77	85	.475	17	48‍–‍33	29‍–‍52
Colorado Rockies	66	96	.407	28	45‍–‍36	21‍–‍60
Arizona Diamondbacks	64	98	.395	30	33‍–‍48	31‍–‍50

==== National League Wild Card ====
Division leaders
Team	W	L	Pct.
Washington Nationals	96	66	.593
Los Angeles Dodgers	94	68	.580
St. Louis Cardinals	90	72	.556

Wild Card teams (Top 2 teams qualify for postseason)
Team	W	L	Pct.	GB
Pittsburgh Pirates	88	74	.543	—
San Francisco Giants	88	74	.543	—
Milwaukee Brewers	82	80	.506	6
New York Mets	79	83	.488	9
Atlanta Braves	79	83	.488	9
Miami Marlins	77	85	.475	11
San Diego Padres	77	85	.475	11
Cincinnati Reds	76	86	.469	12
Philadelphia Phillies	73	89	.451	15
Chicago Cubs	73	89	.451	15
Colorado Rockies	66	96	.407	22
Arizona Diamondbacks	64	98	.395	24

=== Record vs. opponents ===
2014 National League record Source: MLB Standings Grid – 2014
Team	AZ	ATL	CHC	CIN	COL	LAD	MIA	MIL	NYM	PHI	PIT	SD	SF	STL	WSH	AL
Arizona	–	3–3	5–2	3–4	9–10	4–15	3–4	3–4	2–4	2–4	3–4	12–7	6–13	1–5	1–6	7–13
Atlanta	3–3	–	5–1	5–2	4–3	1–6	9–10	5–2	9–10	11–8	3–4	3–4	1–5	2–4	11–8	7–13
Chicago	2–5	1–5	–	8–11	5–2	3–4	4–2	11–8	5–2	3–3	5–14	3–4	2–4	9–10	3–4	9–11
Cincinnati	4–3	2–5	11–8	–	3–4	3–4	4–3	10–9	2–4	3–3	12–7	1–5	5–2	7–12	3–3	6–14
Colorado	10–9	3–4	2–5	4–3	–	6–13	3–4	1–6	3–4	3–3	2–4	10–9	10–9	1–5	1–5	7–13
Los Angeles	15–4	6–1	4–3	4–3	13–6	–	3–3	1–5	4–2	3–4	2–5	12–7	10–9	4–3	2–4	11–9
Miami	4–3	10–9	2–4	3–4	4–3	3–3	–	3–4	8–11	9–10	2–4	3–4	3–4	4–2	6–13	13–7
Milwaukee	4–3	2–5	8–11	9–10	6–1	5–1	4–3	–	4–3	3–4	12–7	3–3	2–4	7–12	2–4	11–9
New York	4–2	10–9	2–5	4–2	4–3	2–4	11–8	3–4	–	13–6	3–4	3–3	1–6	4–3	4–15	11–9
Philadelphia	4–2	8–11	3–3	3–3	3–3	4–3	10–9	4–3	6–13	–	1–6	4–3	2–5	4–3	10–9	7–13
Pittsburgh	4–3	4–3	14–5	7–12	4–2	5–2	4–2	7–12	4–3	6–1	–	3–3	4–2	8–11	3–4	11–9
San Diego	7–12	4–3	4–3	5–1	9–10	7–12	4–3	3–3	3–3	3–4	3–3	–	10–9	3–4	3–4	9–11
San Francisco	13–6	5–1	4–2	2–5	9–10	9–10	4–3	4–2	6–1	5–2	2–4	9–10	–	4–3	2–5	10–10
St. Louis	5–1	4–2	10–9	12–7	5–1	3–4	2–4	12–7	3–4	3–4	11–8	4–3	3–4	–	5–2	8–12
Washington	6–1	8–11	4–3	3–3	5–1	4–2	13–6	4–2	15–4	9–10	4–3	4–3	5–2	2–5	–	10–10

=== Transactions ===
- June 12, 2014: Jordan Pacheco was selected off waivers by the Arizona Diamondbacks from the Colorado Rockies.
- July 2, 2014: Jair Jurrjens was traded by the Cincinnati Reds to the Colorado Rockies for Harold Riggins (minors).
- August 2, 2014: Ryan Wheeler was selected off waivers by the Los Angeles Angels of Anaheim from the Colorado Rockies.

=== Major League Debuts ===
- Batters
  - Kyle Parker (Jun 16)
  - Ben Paulsen (Jul 21)
  - Cristhian Adames (Jul 29)
  - Jackson Williams (Aug 27)
  - Rafael Ynoa (Sep 1)
- Pitchers
  - Tommy Kahnle (Apr 3)
  - Chris Martin (Apr 26)
  - Eddie Butler (Jun 6)
  - Christian Bergman (Jun 9)
  - Tyler Matzek (Jun 11)
  - Yohan Flande (Jun 25)
  - Brooks Brown (Jul 6)

=== Roster ===
2014 Colorado Rockies
**Roster**
**Pitchers**: 30 Brett Anderson; 34 Matt Belisle; 36 Christian Bergman; 35 Chad Bettis; 49 Rex Brothers; 51 Brooks Brown; 31 Eddie Butler; 45 Jhoulys Chacín; 27 Tyler Chatwood; 29 Jorge de la Rosa; 58 Yohan Flande; 53 Christian Friedrich; 32 LaTroy Hawkins; 43 Pedro Hernández; 41 Jair Jurrjens; 54 Tommy Kahnle; 48 Boone Logan; 59 Wilton López; 24 Jordan Lyles; 47 Chris Martin; 37 Nick Masset; 46 Tyler Matzek; 56 Franklin Morales; 12 Juan Nicasio; 0 Adam Ottavino; 62 Rob Scahill	**Catchers**: 8 Michael McKenry; 58 Jordan Pacheco; 20 Wilin Rosario; 15 Jackson Williams; **Infielders**: 10 Cristhian Adames; 28 Nolan Arenado; 23 Charlie Culberson; 9 DJ LeMahieu; 33 Justin Morneau; 4 Ben Paulsen; 14 Josh Rutledge; 2 Troy Tulowitzki; 4,44 Ryan Wheeler; 43 Rafael Ynoa; **Outfielders**: 1 Brandon Barnes; 19 Charlie Blackmon; 3 Michael Cuddyer; 6 Corey Dickerson; 5 Carlos González; 7 Matt McBride; 16 Kyle Parker; 26 Jason Pridie; 13 Drew Stubbs	**Manager**: 22 Walt Weiss; **Coaches**: 68 Pat Burgess (bullpen catcher); 9 Vinny Castilla (special asst.); 39 Stu Cole (third base); 25 Blake Doyle (hitting); 38 Rene Lachemann (catching); 40 Bo McLaughlin (bullpen); 11 Tom Runnells (bench); 52 Jim Wright (pitching); 21 Eric Young (first base)

=== Game log ===
Legend
	Rockies win
	Rockies loss
	Postponement
**Bold**	Rockies team member

2014 Game Log
March (0–1)

#	Date	Opponent	Score	Win	Loss	Save	Attendance	Record
1	March 31	@ Marlins	10–1	Fernández (1–0)	**de la Rosa** (0–1)		37,116	0–1

April (16–12)

#	Date	Opponent	Score	Win	Loss	Save	Attendance	Record
2	April 1	@ Marlins	4–3	Eovaldi (1–0)	**Anderson** (0–1)	Cishek (1)	15,906	0–2
3	April 2	@ Marlins	6–5	**Lyles** (1–0)	Álvarez (0–1)	**Hawkins** (1)	15,866	1–2
4	April 3	@ Marlins	8–5	Ramos (1–0)	**Belisle** (0–1)	Cishek (2)	15,378	1–3
5	April 4	Diamondbacks	12–2	**Nicasio** (1–0)	Delgado (0–1)		49,130	2–3
6	April 5	Diamondbacks	9–4	**Kahnle** (1–0)	McCarthy (0–1)		34,407	3–3
7	April 6	Diamondbacks	5–3	Miley (2–1)	**Anderson** (0–2)	Reed (2)	29,779	3–4
8	April 7	White Sox	8–1	**Lyles** (2–0)	Paulino (0–1)		22,550	4–4
9	April 8	White Sox	15–3	Quintana (1–0)	**Morales** (0–1)		25,393	4–5
10	April 9	White Sox	10–4	**Brothers** (1–0)	Downs (0–2)		22,745	5–5
11	April 11	@ Giants	6–5	Bumgarner (2–0)	**de la Rosa** (0–2)	Romo (3)	41,707	5–6
12	April 12	@ Giants	1–0	**Kahnle** (2–0)	Cain (0–2)	**Hawkins** (2)	41,917	6–6
13	April 13	@ Giants	5–4 (10)	Romo (1–0)	**Brothers** (1–1)		41,490	6–7
14	April 14	@ Padres	5–4	Thayer (2–0)	**Brothers** (1–2)	Street (4)	14,784	6–8
15	April 15	@ Padres	3–2	**Nicasio** (2–0)	Erlin (1–1)	**Hawkins** (3)	18,012	7–8
16	April 16	@ Padres	4–2	Cashner (2–1)	**de la Rosa** (0–3)	Street (5)	17,428	7–9
17	April 17	@ Padres	3–1	**Morales** (1–1)	Kennedy (1–3)	**Hawkins** (4)	17,557	8–9
18	April 18	Phillies	12–1	**Chatwood** (1–0)	Pettibone (0–1)		35,705	9–9
19	April 19	Phillies	3–1	**Lyles** (3–0)	Kendrick (0–2)	**Hawkins** (5)	31,352	10–9
20	April 20	Phillies	10–9	Diekman (2–1)	**Belisle** (0–2)	Papelbon (5)	33,563	10–10
21	April 21	Giants	8–2	**de la Rosa** (1–3)	Vogelsong (0–1)		25,434	11–10
22	April 22	Giants	2–1	**Morales** (2–1)	Bumgarner (2–2)	**Hawkins** (6)	27,165	12–10
23	April 23	Giants	12–10 (11)	Machi (4–0)	**Bettis** (0–1)		35,191	12–11
24	April 25	@ Dodgers	5–4 (11)	**Brothers** (2–2)	Wright (1–1)	**Hawkins** (7)	44,866	13–11
25	April 26	@ Dodgers	6–3	Maholm (1–2)	**Nicasio** (2–1)	Jansen (9)	45,241	13–12
26	April 27	@ Dodgers	6–1	**de la Rosa** (2–3)	Ryu (3–2)		52,359	14–12
27	April 28	@ Diamondbacks	8–5	**Morales** (3–1)	Miley (2–3)	**Hawkins** (8)	17,127	15–12
28	April 29	@ Diamondbacks	5–4	**Logan** (1–0)	Reed (0–2)	**Hawkins** (9)	19,702	16–12
29	April 30	@ Diamondbacks	5–4 (10)	Reed (1–1)	**Kahnle** (2–1)		19,135	16–13

May (12–14)

#	Date	Opponent	Score	Win	Loss	Save	Attendance	Record
30	May 1	Mets	7–4	**Nicasio** (3–1)	Colón (2–4)		22,989	17–13
31	May 2	Mets	10–3	**de la Rosa** (3–3)	Wheeler (1–3)		42,040	18–13
32	May 3	Mets	11–10	**Hawkins** (1–0)	Farnsworth (0–2)		38,688	19–13
33	May 4	Mets	5–1	Gee (3–1)	**Chacín** (0–1)		40,190	19–14
34	May 5	Rangers	8–2	**Lyles** (4–0)	Pérez (4–2)		26,242	20–14
35	May 6	Rangers	12–1	**Nicasio** (4–1)	Ross Jr. (1–3)		27,838	21–14
36	May 7	@ Rangers	9–2	**de la Rosa** (4–3)	Lewis (2–2)		29,467	22–14
37	May 8	@ Rangers	5–0	Harrison (1–0)	**Morales** (3–2)		27,617	22–15
38	May 9	@ Reds	4–3	Broxton (1–0)	**Logan** (1–1)		27,187	22–16
39	May 10	@ Reds	11–2	**Lyles** (5–0)	Simón (4–2)		37,984	23–16
40	May 11	@ Reds	4–1	Bailey (3–2)	**Nicasio** (4–2)	Chapman (1)	33,143	23–17
41	May 13	@ Royals	5–1	Shields (5–3)	**Morales** (3–3)		15,914	23–18
42	May 14	@ Royals	3–2	Vargas (4–1)	**Chacín** (0–2)	Holland (10)	27,323	23–19
43	May 16	Padres	3–1	**de la Rosa** (5–3)	Stults (2–4)	**Hawkins** (10)	35,384	24–19
44	May 17	Padres	8–5	Erlin (3–4)	**Lyles** (5–1)	Street (13)	40,508	24–20
45	May 18	Padres	8–6 (10)	**Masset** (1–0)	Thayer (2–2)		44,092	25–20
46	May 20	Giants	5–4	**Hawkins** (2–0)	Romo (3–1)		31,046	26–20
47	May 21	Giants	5–1	Petit (3–1)	**Chacín** (0–3)		30,411	26–21
–	May 22	Giants	Suspended (rain) Rescheduled for September 1					
48	May 23	@ Braves	3–2	Carpenter (4–0)	**Ottavino** (0–1)	Kimbrel (13)	25,646	26–22
49	May 24	@ Braves	3–1	**Nicasio** (5–2)	Minor (2–3)	**Hawkins** (11)	26,741	27–22
50	May 25	@ Braves	7–0	Teherán (4–3)	**Morales** (3–4)		35,565	27–23
51	May 26	@ Phillies	9–0	Kendrick (1–5)	**Chacín** (0–4)		27,289	27–24
52	May 27	@ Phillies	6–2	**de la Rosa** (6–3)	Hamels (1–3)		23,159	28–24
53	May 28	@ Phillies	6–3	Papelbon (1–1)	**Hawkins** (2–1)		23,691	28–25
54	May 30	@ Indians	5–2	Kluber (6–3)	**Nicasio** (5–3)	Allen (2)	25,066	28–26
55	May 31	@ Indians	7–6	Shaw (2–1)	**Brothers** (2–3)	Allen (3)	20,174	28–27

June (8–20)

#	Date	Opponent	Score	Win	Loss	Save	Attendance	Record
56	June 1	@ Indians	6–4	Atchison (2–0)	**Ottavino** (0–2)		16,682	28–28
57	June 3	Diamondbacks	4–2	Anderson (4–0)	**de la Rosa** (6–4)	Reed (15)	29,682	28–29
58	June 4	Diamondbacks	16–8	Ziegler (2–1)	**Brothers** (2–4)		26,199	28–30
59	June 5	Diamondbacks	12–7	Arroyo (5–4)	**Nicasio** (5–4)		26,521	28–31
60	June 6	Dodgers	7–2	Ryu (7–2)	**Butler** (0–1)		39,203	28–32
61	June 7	Dodgers	5–4 (10)	**Morales** (4–4)	Perez (0–3)		40,474	29–32
62	June 8	Dodgers	6–1 (6)	Kershaw (5–2)	**de la Rosa** (6–5)		38,111	29–33
63	June 9	Braves	3–1	Floyd (1–2)	**Bergman** (0–1)	Kimbrel (17)	28,817	29–34
64	June 10	Braves	13–10	Hale (2–0)	**Nicasio** (5–5)	Kimbrel (18)	27,875	29–35
65	June 11	Braves	8–2	**Matzek** (1–0)	Teherán (6–4)		29,112	30–35
66	June 12	Braves	10–3	**Chacín** (1–4)	Santana (5–3)		33,648	31–35
67	June 13	@ Giants	7–4	**Belisle** (1–2)	Romo (3–2)	**Hawkins** (12)	41,258	32–35
68	June 14	@ Giants	5–4	**Brothers** (3–4)	Romo (3–3)	**Hawkins** (13)	41,704	33–35
69	June 15	@ Giants	8–7	**Belisle** (2–2)	Gutiérrez (1–2)	**Hawkins** (14)	41,824	34–35
70	June 16	@ Dodgers	6–1	Ryu (8–3)	**Matzek** (1–1)		44,077	34–36
71	June 17	@ Dodgers	4–2	Greinke (9–3)	**Chacín** (1–5)	Jansen (20)	44,175	34–37
72	June 18	@ Dodgers	8–0	Kershaw (7–2)	**de la Rosa** (6–6)		46,069	34–38
73	June 20	Brewers	13–10	Estrada (6–4)	**Bergman** (0–2)	Rodríguez (24)	41,238	34–39
74	June 21	Brewers	9–4	Peralta (8–5)	**Friedrich** (0–1)		38,020	34–40
75	June 22	Brewers	6–5	Lohse (9–2)	**Matzek** (1–2)	Rodríguez (25)	36,619	34–41
76	June 23	Cardinals	8–0	Lynn (8–5)	**Chacín** (1–6)		37,078	34–42
77	June 24	Cardinals	10–5	**de la Rosa** (7–6)	Greenwood (1–1)		34,554	35–42
78	June 25	Cardinals	9–6	Neshek (2–0)	**Ottavino** (0–3)	Rosenthal (23)	34,635	35–43
79	June 26	@ Brewers	7–4	Peralta (9–5)	**Friedrich** (0–2)	Rodríguez (26)	27,056	35–44
80	June 27	@ Brewers	3–2	Rodríguez (3–2)	**Belisle** (2–3)		34,132	35–45
81	June 28	@ Brewers	7–4	Garza (5–5)	**Chacín** (1–7)	Rodríguez (27)	40,816	35–46
82	June 29	@ Brewers	10–4	**de la Rosa** (8–6)	Gallardo (5–5)		43,656	36–46
83	June 30	@ Nationals	7–3	Zimmermann (6–4)	**Flande** (0–1)		33,660	36–47

July (8–17)

#	Date	Opponent	Score	Win	Loss	Save	Attendance	Record
84	July 1	@ Nationals	7–1	Strasburg (7–6)	**Friedrich** (0–3)		26,033	36–48
85	July 2	@ Nationals	4–3	Fister (7–2)	**Belisle** (2–4)	Soriano (20)	28,943	36–49
86	July 3	Dodgers	3–2	Greinke (11–4)	**Hawkins** (2–2)	Jansen (26)	48,533	36–50
87	July 4	Dodgers	9–0	Kershaw (10–2)	**Jurrjens** (0–1)		48,815	36–51
88	July 5	Dodgers	8–7	**de la Rosa** (9–6)	Haren (8–5)	**Hawkins** (15)	32,926	37–51
89	July 6	Dodgers	8–2	Beckett (6–5)	**Flande** (0–2)		33,924	37–52
90	July 7	Padres	6–1	Kennedy (7–9)	**Matzek** (1–3)		26,782	37–53
91	July 8	Padres	2–1	**Morales** (5–4)	Ross (7–9)	**Hawkins** (16)	27,601	38–53
92	July 9	Padres	6–3	**Logan** (2–1)	Benoit (3–1)	**Hawkins** (17)	26,212	39–53
93	July 11	Twins	6–2	**de la Rosa** (10–6)	Johnson (0–1)		36,110	40–53
94	July 12	Twins	9–3	Correia (5–11)	**Matzek** (1–4)		35,930	40–54
95	July 13	Twins	13–5	Hughes (10–5)	**Anderson** (0–3)		35,743	40–55
96	July 18	@ Pirates	4–2	Watson (6–1)	**Belisle** (2–5)	Melancon (17)	37,833	40–56
97	July 19	@ Pirates	3–2 (11)	Hughes (5–2)	**Bettis** (0–2)		37,396	40–57
98	July 20	@ Pirates	5–3	Gómez (2–2)	**Belisle** (2–6)	Melancon (18)	35,609	40–58
99	July 21	Nationals	7–2	Fister (9–2)	**Morales** (5–5)		33,082	40–59
100	July 22	Nationals	7–4	Stammen (1–4)	**Brown** (0–1)	Soriano (23)	36,874	40–60
101	July 23	Nationals	6–4	**de la Rosa** (11–6)	Strasburg (7–8)		30,728	41–60
102	July 25	Pirates	8–1	**Anderson** (1–3)	Morton (5–10)		34,487	42–60
103	July 26	Pirates	8–1	**Matzek** (2–4)	Locke (2–2)		44,611	43–60
104	July 27	Pirates	7–5	Watson (7–1)	**Brothers** (3–5)	Melancon (19)	40,382	43–61
105	July 28	@ Cubs	4–1	Wada (1–1)	**Flande** (0–3)	Rondón (13)	29,702	43–62
106	July 29	@ Cubs	4–3 (16)	Baker (1–0)	**Matzek** (2–5)		28,590	43–63
107	July 30	@ Cubs	6–4 (10)	**Scahill** (1–0)	Wright (0–2)	**Ottavino** (1)	29,491	44–63
108	July 31	@ Cubs	3–1	Arrieta (6–2)	**Hernández** (0–1)	Rondón (14)	35,729	44–64

August (10–18)

#	Date	Opponent	Score	Win	Loss	Save	Attendance	Record
109	August 1	@ Tigers	4–2	Verlander (10–9)	**Morales** (5–6)	Nathan (22)	39,052	44–65
110	August 2	@ Tigers	11–5	Porcello (13–5)	**Matzek** (2–6)		42,811	44–66
111	August 3	@ Tigers	4–0	Sánchez (8–5)	**de la Rosa** (11–7)		41,487	44–67
112	August 5	Cubs	6–5 (12)	Rondón (3–3)	**Logan** (2–2)	Villanueva (2)	35,043	44–68
113	August 6	Cubs	13–4	**Lyles** (6–1)	Arrieta (6–3)		35,804	45–68
114	August 7	Cubs	6–2	Hendricks (3–1)	**Flande** (0–4)		32,585	45–69
115	August 8	@ Diamondbacks	5–3	Anderson (7–4)	**Matzek** (2–7)		21,782	45–70
116	August 9	@ Diamondbacks	14–4	Cahill (2–8)	**de la Rosa** (11–8)		24,993	45–71
117	August 10	@ Diamondbacks	5–3 (10)	**Belisle** (3–6)	Pérez (2–2)	**Hawkins** (18)	22,104	46–71
118	August 11	@ Padres	4–3	Vincent (1–2)	**Logan** (2–3)	Benoit (6)	28,591	46–72
119	August 12	@ Padres	4–1	Despaigne (3–3)	**Flande** (0–5)		27,188	46–73
120	August 13	@ Padres	5–3	Kennedy (9–10)	**Matzek** (2–8)	Benoit (7)	23,902	46–74
121	August 14	Reds	7–3	**de la Rosa** (12–8)	Simón (12–8)		32,538	47–74
122	August 15	Reds	3–2	Cueto (15–6)	**Ottavino** (0–4)	Chapman (26)	33,668	47–75
–	August 16	Reds	Postponed (water main break) Rescheduled for August 17					
123	August 17	Reds	10–9	**Brothers** (4–5)	Hoover (1–9)		42,310	48–75
124	August 17	Reds	10–5	**Ottavino** (1–4)	Contreras (0–1)		33,604	49–75
125	August 19	Royals	7–4	Shields (12–6)	**Matzek** (2–9)	Holland (39)	30,394	49–76
126	August 20	Royals	5–2	**de la Rosa** (13–8)	Duffy (8–11)	**Hawkins** (19)	28,834	50–76
127	August 22	Marlins	13–5	Álvarez (10–5)	**Morales** (5–7)		30,674	50–77
128	August 23	Marlins	5–4 (13)	**Belisle** (4–6)	Dyson (2–1)		31,109	51–77
129	August 24	Marlins	7–4	**Bergman** (1–2)	Hand (2–6)	**Hawkins** (20)	40,509	52–77
130	August 25	@ Giants	3–2	**Matzek** (3–9)	Peavy (3–13)	**Hawkins** (21)	41,052	53–77
131	August 26	@ Giants	3–0	Bumgarner (15–9)	**de la Rosa** (13–9)		41,050	53–78
132	August 27	@ Giants	4–2	Casilla (2–3)	**Nicasio** (5–6)		41,071	53–79
133	August 28	@ Giants	4–1	Petit (4–3)	**Lyles** (6–2)	Casilla (12)	41,017	53–80
134	August 29	@ Diamondbacks	5–2	Ziegler (5–2)	**Brothers** (4–6)	Reed (31)	22,585	53–81
135	August 30	@ Diamondbacks	2–0	**Matzek** (4–9)	Nuño (2–9)	**Hawkins** (22)	27,272	54–81
136	August 31	@ Diamondbacks	6–2	Anderson (8–6)	**de la Rosa** (13–10)		22,948	54–82

September (12–14)

#	Date	Opponent	Score	Win	Loss	Save	Attendance	Record
137	September 1	Giants	4–2	Affeldt (1–1)	**Friedrich** (0–1)	Casilla (2)	36,468	54–83
138	September 1	Giants	10–9	**Hawkins** (3–2)	Romo (5–4)		33,711	55–83
139	September 2	Giants	12–7	Kontos (4–0)	**Belisle** (4–7)		25,256	55–84
140	September 3	Giants	9–2	**Bergman** (2–2)	Vogelsong (8–10)		23,122	56–84
141	September 5	Padres	3–0	**Matzek** (5–9)	Stults (6–16)		24,586	57–84
142	September 6	Padres	7–6 (12)	**Masset** (2–0)	Hahn (7–4)		28,496	58–84
143	September 7	Padres	6–0	**Morales** (6–7)	Ross (13–13)		26,102	59–84
144	September 8	@ Mets	3–2	Torres (7–5)	**Hawkins** (3–3)		21,710	59–85
145	September 9	@ Mets	2–0	deGrom (8–6)	**Bergman** (2–3)	Familia (5)	21,035	59–86
146	September 10	@ Mets	2–0	Montero (1–3)	**Matzek** (5–10)	Mejía (25)	21,260	59–87
147	September 12	@ Cardinals	5–1	Wainwright (18–9)	**de la Rosa** (13–11)		45,108	59–88
148	September 13	@ Cardinals	5–4	Miller (10–9)	**Morales** (6–8)	Neshek (6)	45,552	59–89
149	September 14	@ Cardinals	4–1	Gonzales (3–2)	**Lyles** (6–3)	Rosenthal (44)	44,598	59–90
150	September 15	Dodgers	11–3	Wright (5–4)	**Bergman** (2–4)		29,031	59–91
151	September 16	Dodgers	10–4	**Matzek** (6–10)	Haren (13–11)		28,983	60–91
152	September 17	Dodgers	16–2	**de la Rosa** (14–11)	Frías (0–1)		24,866	61–91
153	September 18	Diamondbacks	7–6	**Hawkins** (4–3)	Reed (1–7)		23,775	62–91
154	September 19	Diamondbacks	15–3	**Lyles** (7–3)	Anderson (9–7)		37,022	63–91
155	September 20	Diamondbacks	5–1	**Butler** (1–1)	Cahill (3–12)		33,764	64–91
156	September 21	Diamondbacks	8–3	**Bergman** (3–4)	Miley (8–12)		29,036	65–91
157	September 22	@ Padres	1–0	Stults (8–17)	**Matzek** (6–11)	Quackenbush (6)	19,770	65–92
158	September 23	@ Padres	3–2	**Nicasio** (6–6)	Thayer (4–4)	**Hawkins** (23)	33,669	66–92
159	September 24	@ Padres	4–3	Wieland (1–0)	**Flande** (0–6)	Benoit (10)	38,589	66–93
160	September 26	@ Dodgers	7–4	Elbert (1–0)	**Lyles** (7–4)		43,328	66–94
161	September 27	@ Dodgers	6–5 (12)	Frías (1–1)	**Morales** (6–9)		46,631	66–95
162	September 28	@ Dodgers	10–5	Greinke (17–8)	**Bergman** (3–5)		48,278	66–96

== Player stats ==
= Indicates team leader

=== Batting ===
==== Starters by position ====
Note: Pos = Position; G = Games played; AB = At bats; H = Hits; Avg. = Batting average; HR = Home runs; RBI = Runs batted in

Pos	Player	G	AB	H	Avg.	HR	RBI
C	Wilin Rosario	106	382	102	.267	13	54
1B	Justin Morneau	135	502	160	.319	17	82
2B	DJ LeMahieu	149	494	132	.267	5	42
SS	Troy Tulowitzki	91	315	107	.340	21	52
3B	Nolan Arenado	111	432	124	.287	18	61
LF	Corey Dickerson	131	436	136	.312	24	76
CF	Drew Stubbs	132	388	112	.289	15	43
RF	Charlie Blackmon	154	593	171	.288	19	72

Note: Tulowitzki had a .340 average, but didn't meet the minimum at-bat requirements for a batting title.

==== Other batters ====
Note: G = Games played; AB = At bats; H = Hits; Avg. = Batting average; HR = Home runs; RBI = Runs batted in

Player	G	AB	H	Avg.	HR	RBI
Josh Rutledge	105	309	83	.269	4	33
Brandon Barnes	132	292	75	.257	8	27
Carlos González	70	260	62	.238	11	38
Charlie Culberson	95	210	41	.195	3	24
Michael Cuddyer	49	190	63	.332	10	31
Michael McKenry	57	168	53	.315	8	22
Jordan Pacheco	22	72	17	.236	0	8
Rafael Ynoa	19	67	23	.343	0	13
Ben Paulsen	31	63	20	.317	4	10
Ryan Wheeler	31	56	13	.232	2	13
Matt McBride	21	31	7	.226	2	6
Kyle Parker	18	26	5	.192	0	1
Cristhian Adames	7	15	1	.067	0	0
Jackson Williams	7	14	3	.214	1	3
Jason Pridie	2	4	0	.000	0	0

=== Pitching ===
==== Starting pitchers ====
Note: G = Games pitched; IP = Innings pitched; W = Wins; L = Losses; ERA = Earned run average; SO = Strikeouts

Player	G	IP	W	L	ERA	SO
Jorge De La Rosa	32	184.1	14	11	4.10	139
Jordan Lyles	22	126.2	7	4	4.33	90
Tyler Matzek	20	117.2	6	11	4.05	91
Jhoulys Chacín	11	63.1	1	7	5.40	42
Christian Bergman	10	54.2	3	5	5.93	31
Brett Anderson	8	43.1	1	3	2.91	29
Tyler Chatwood	4	24.0	1	0	4.50	20
Eddie Butler	3	16.0	1	1	6.75	3
Jair Jurrjens	2	9.1	0	1	10.61	9
Pedro Hernández	1	5.2	0	1	4.76	2

==== Other pitchers ====
Note: G = Games pitched; IP = Innings pitched; W = Wins; L = Losses; ERA = Earned run average; SO = Strikeouts

Player	G	IP	W	L	ERA	SO
Franklin Morales	38	142.1	6	9	5.37	100
Juan Nicasio	33	93.2	6	6	5.38	63
Yohan Flande	16	59.0	0	6	5.19	34
Christian Friedrich	16	24.1	0	4	5.92	27

==== Relief pitchers ====
Note: G = Games pitched; W = Wins; L = Losses; SV = Saves; ERA = Earned run average; SO = Strikeouts

Player	G	W	L	SV	ERA	SO
LaTroy Hawkins	57	4	3	23	3.31	32
Adam Ottavino	75	1	4	1	3.60	70
Rex Brothers	74	4	6	0	5.59	55
Matt Belisle	66	4	7	0	4.87	43
Tommy Kahnle	54	2	1	0	4.19	63
Nick Masset	51	2	0	0	5.80	36
Boone Logan	35	2	3	0	6.84	32
Brooks Brown	28	0	1	0	2.77	21
Chad Bettis	21	0	2	0	9.12	13
Chris Martin	16	0	0	0	6.89	14
Rob Scahill	12	1	0	0	4.80	11
Wilton López	4	0	0	0	11.37	4

== Notes ==
- On June 18, 2014, Clayton Kershaw of the Los Angeles Dodgers threw a no-hitter against the Rockies at Dodger Stadium. The Dodgers beat the Rockies by a score of 8–0.
- On July 29, 2014, the Chicago Cubs defeated the Rockies, 4–3, in 16-inning game at Wrigley Field that lasted 6 hours and 27 minutes. Time-wise, it was the longest game in the history for both franchises. Colorado's previous record was set in 2008 in a 6 hour-16 minute game against the San Diego Padres. The Cubs' previous record was set in 1982 in a 6-hour-10-minute game against the Dodgers.
- On August 17, 2014, in the second game of a doubleheader, Michael Cuddyer hit for the cycle. In doing so, he became only the third player in Major League history—after Bob Watson and John Olerud—to hit for the cycle in both the American and National Leagues. His previous cycle came in 2009 while playing for the Minnesota Twins.

== Farm system ==
Level	Team	League	Manager
AAA	Colorado Springs Sky Sox	Pacific Coast League	Glenallen Hill
AA	Tulsa Drillers	Texas League	Kevin Riggs
A	Modesto Nuts	California League	Don Sneddon
A	Asheville Tourists	South Atlantic League	Fred Ocasio
A-Short Season	Tri-City Dust Devils	Northwest League	Drew Saylor
Rookie	Grand Junction Rockies	Pioneer League	Anthony Sanders

LEAGUE CHAMPIONS: Asheville

Records
Preceded by 2013	Colorado Rockies seasons 2014	Succeeded by 2015
