= Ken Roberts (baseball) =

American baseball player (born 1988)

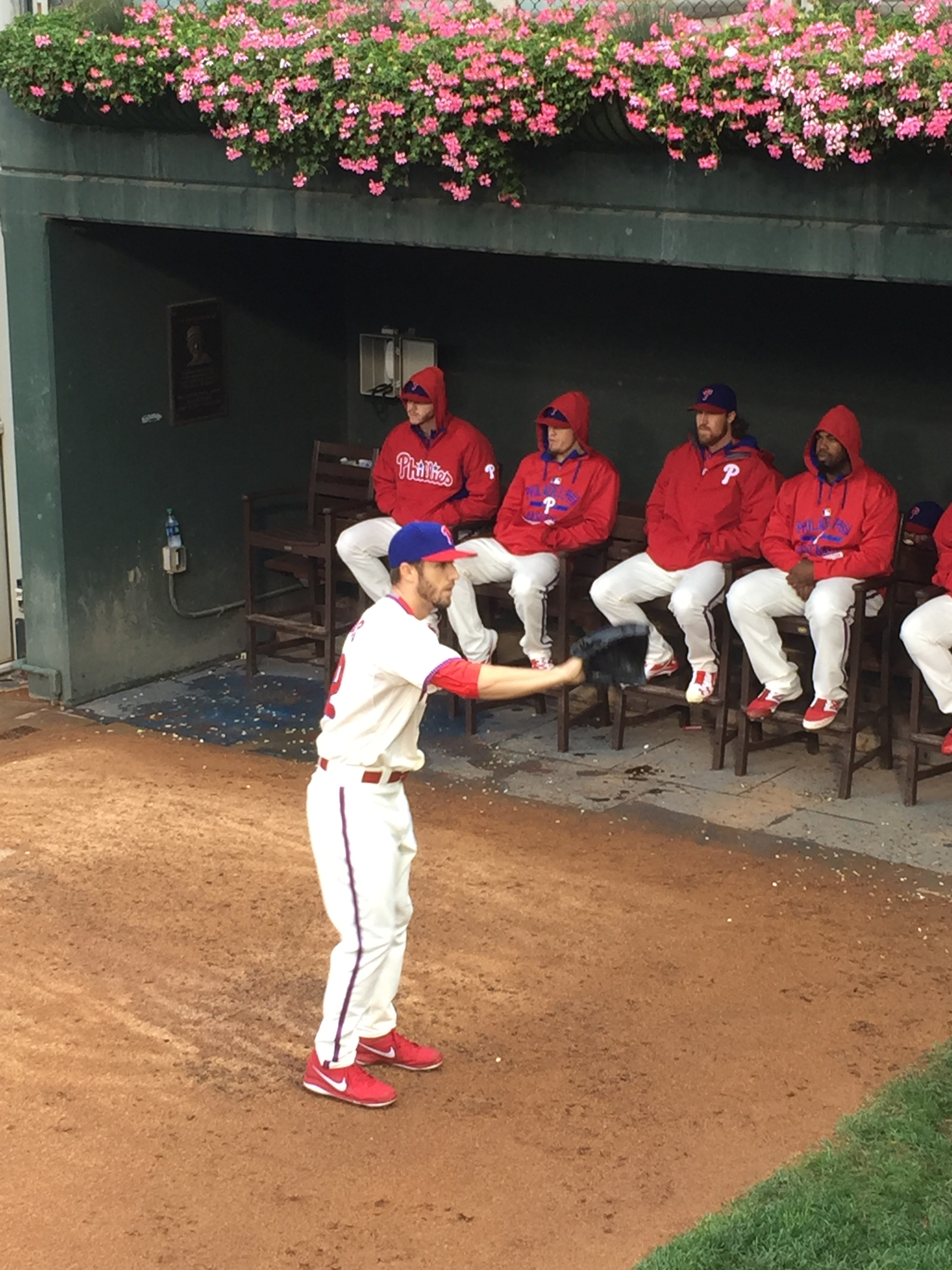
- Ken Roberts with the Philadelphia Phillies
- Pitcher
- Born: March 9, 1988 (age 38); Murfreesboro, Tennessee
- Batted: Left Threw: Left

MLB debut
- May 3, 2015, for the Colorado Rockies

Last appearance
- October 3, 2015, for the Philadelphia Phillies

MLB statistics
- Win–loss record: 1–1
- Earned run average: 7.24
- Strikeouts: 6
- Stats at Baseball Reference

Teams
- Colorado Rockies (2015); Philadelphia Phillies (2015)

Kenneth Elwin Roberts (born March 9, 1988) is an American former professional baseball pitcher, who played in Major League Baseball (MLB) with the Colorado Rockies and Philadelphia Phillies. He made his big league debut with the Rockies, on May 3, 2015.

== Career ==
=== Colorado Rockies ===
Roberts played college baseball at Middle Tennessee State University. He was drafted by the Colorado Rockies in the 25th round of the 2010 Major League Baseball draft.

Roberts was promoted to the majors for the first time on May 2, 2015. In 9 appearances for Colorado, he posted a 5.79 ERA with 5 strikeouts across 9 2/3 innings pitched. Roberts was designated for assignment by the Rockies following the promotion of Jason Gurka on August 28.

=== Philadelphia Phillies ===
On August 30, 2015, Roberts was claimed off waivers by the Philadelphia Phillies. In 6 appearances for the team, he struggled to a 10.38 ERA with 1 strikeout over 4 1/3 innings of work. On October 7, Roberts was removed from the 40-man roster and sent outright to the Triple–A Lehigh Valley IronPigs. He was released by the Phillies organization on March 31, 2016.
