= Eddie Butler (baseball) =

American baseball player (born 1991)

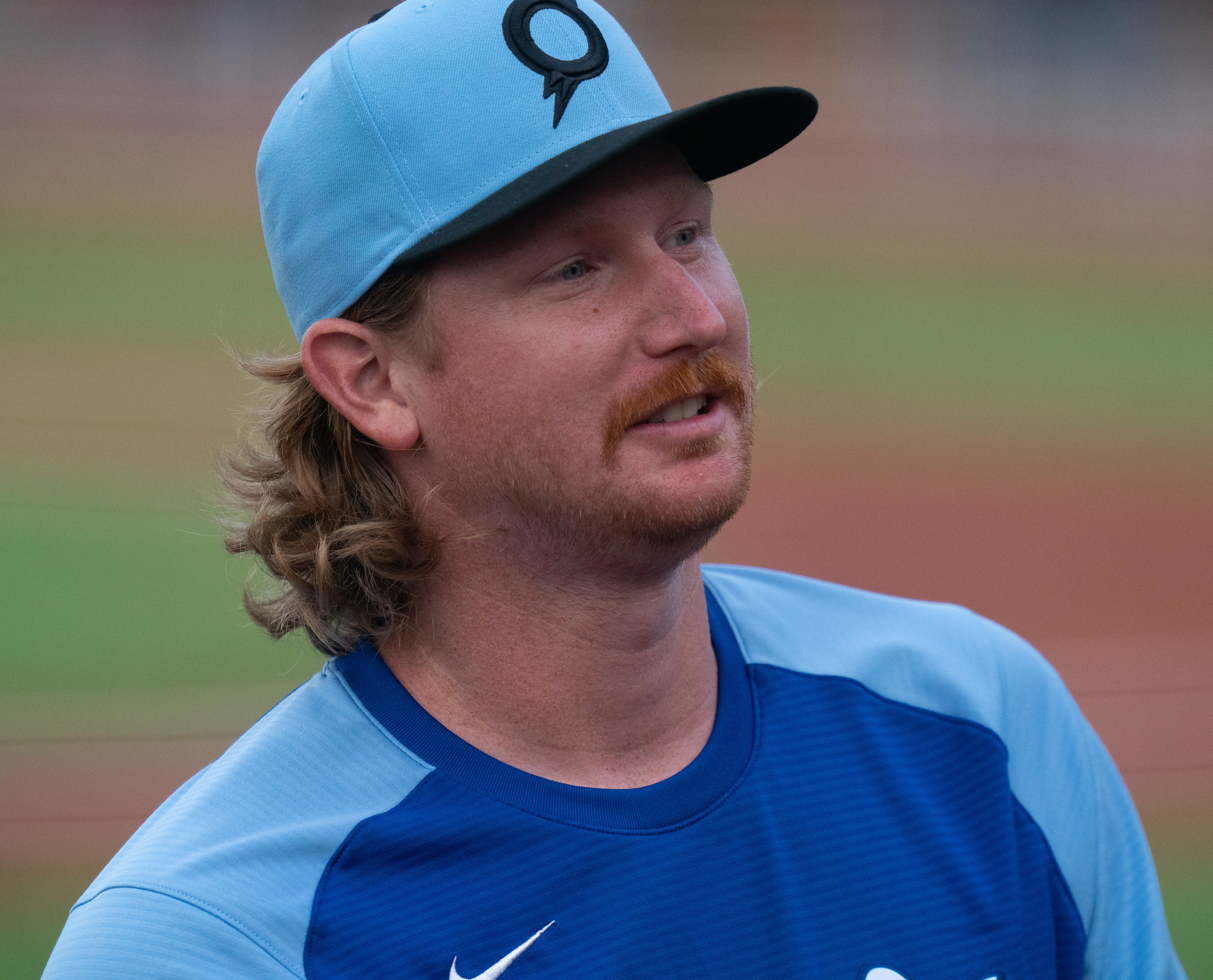
- Butler with the Omaha Storm Chasers in 2021
- Pitcher
- Born: March 13, 1991 (age 35); Chesapeake, Virginia, U.S.
- Batted: Right Threw: Right

Professional debut
- MLB: June 6, 2014, for the Colorado Rockies
- KBO: March 23, 2019, for the NC Dinos

Last appearance
- MLB: September 28, 2018, for the Texas Rangers
- KBO: June 18, 2019, for the NC Dinos

MLB statistics
- Win–loss record: 12–22
- Earned run average: 5.80
- Strikeouts: 153

KBO statistics
- Win–loss record: 3–6
- Earned run average: 4.76
- Strikeouts: 49
- Stats at Baseball Reference

Teams
- Colorado Rockies (2014–2016); Chicago Cubs (2017–2018); Texas Rangers (2018); NC Dinos (2019)

Timothy Edward Butler (born March 13, 1991) is an American former professional baseball pitcher. He played in Major League Baseball (MLB) for the Colorado Rockies, Chicago Cubs, and Texas Rangers, and in the KBO League for the NC Dinos.

== Amateur career ==
Butler attended Greenbrier Christian Academy in Chesapeake, Virginia. After playing for the school's baseball team, The Virginian-Pilot named him to their All-Tidewater team in 2009, his senior year. The Texas Rangers selected him in the 35th round of the 2009 Major League Baseball draft. He did not sign and attended Radford University, where he played college baseball for the Radford Highlanders.

In his junior year, Butler pitched to a 7–4 win–loss record and a 2.20 earned run average (ERA). He won the Big South Conference Pitcher of the Year Award. In 2011, he played collegiate summer baseball with the Harwich Mariners of the Cape Cod Baseball League.

== Professional career ==
=== Colorado Rockies ===
The Colorado Rockies selected Butler in the first round of the 2012 Major League Baseball draft. He signed with the Rockies, receiving a $1 million signing bonus. Butler made his professional debut with the Grand Junction Rockies of the Rookie-level Pioneer League, and was named an All-Star after going 7–1 with a 2.13 ERA and 55 strikeouts. Butler began the 2013 season with the Asheville Tourists of the Single-A South Atlantic League, but after making nine starts for Asheville, he was promoted to the Modesto Nuts of the High-A California League. He was named to appear in the 2013 All-Star Futures Game, where he pitched an inning without allowing a run. Butler made six starts for the Tulsa Drillers of the Double-A Texas League to conclude the season.

The Rockies invited Butler to spring training in 2014. They assigned him to Tulsa to start the 2014 season, and he started Tulsa's season opener. After he pitched to a 2.49 ERA with 40 strikeouts and 19 walks in 68 2/3 innings pitched, the Rockies promoted Butler to the major leagues for his debut on June 6. He recorded a loss in his first start, pitching 5 1/3innings and giving up 6 runs on 10 hits. He was placed on the disabled-list before his next scheduled start with right shoulder inflammation, and he was replaced by Tyler Matzek, who would be the third starting pitcher to debut for the Rockies in six days, along with Butler and Christian Bergman.

Butler won the fifth starter's spot out of Spring Training in 2015. Butler struggled mightily at the beginning, inducing 30 walks while striking out just 29 in 54 1/3 innings. He was demoted at the end of May to the Triple-A Albuquerque Isotopes. Butler was once again called up, he finished the season with a 3–10 record along with an ERA of 5.90 in 16 games started. He also had his first complete game of his career. Right-handed batters had a higher batting average against him, .340, than against all other MLB pitchers in 30 or more innings.

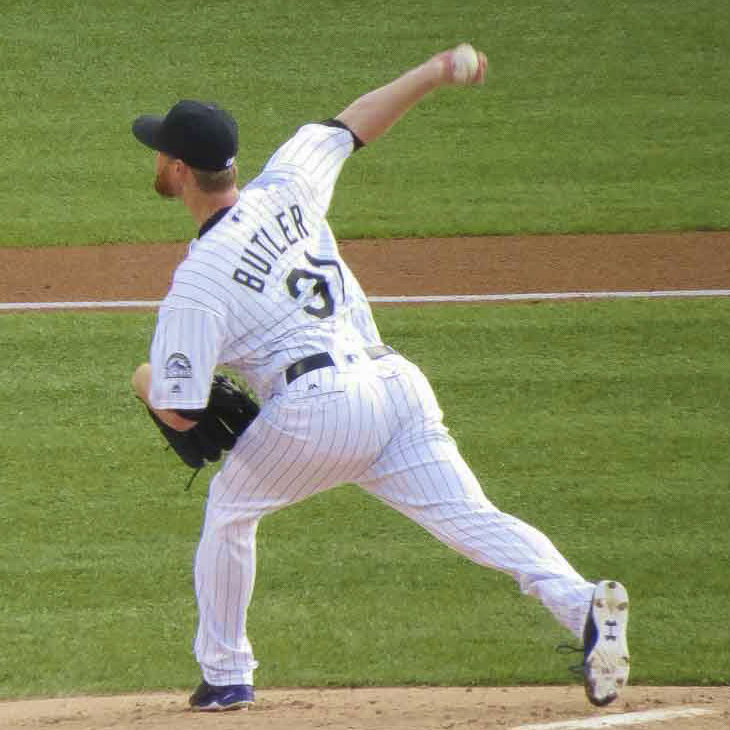
Butler with the Rockies in 2016

Butler finished the 2016 season 2–5 with a 7.17 ERA. On January 28, 2017, Butler was designated for assignment.

=== Chicago Cubs ===
On February 1, 2017, Butler was traded to the Chicago Cubs in exchange for James Farris. He made his Cubs debut on May 12 and pitched 6 shutout innings in a 3–2 victory over the Cardinals. Butler spent time in the Cubs' rotation and with the Triple-A Iowa Cubs, appearing in 13 games for Chicago, 11 of them starts. In 54 2/3 innings, Butler was 4–3 with a 3.95 ERA and 30 strikeouts. The following season, Butler began the season in the Cubs' bullpen before being placed on the 60-day disabled list with a right groin strain on June 11, 2018.

=== Texas Rangers ===
On July 27, 2018, Butler (along with Rollie Lacy and Alexander Ovalles) was traded to the Texas Rangers in exchange for Cole Hamels. In 22 appearances, he pitched to a 6.47 ERA in 32 innings while going 2-for-2 in save opportunities. Butler elected free agency on November 21.

=== NC Dinos ===
On December 3, 2018, Butler signed a one-year, $800,000 contract with the NC Dinos of the KBO League. He was waived on July 3, 2019, after pitching to a 3–6 record with a 4.76 ERA and 49 strikeouts in 13 starts.

=== Chicago Dogs ===
On June 17, 2020, Butler signed with the Chicago Dogs of the American Association of Independent Professional Baseball. In 12 games (11 starts) for the Dogs, he struggled to an 0-7 record and 5.65 ERA with 40 strikeouts across 65 1/3 innings pitched. On November 12, Butler was released by Chicago.

=== Kansas City Royals ===
On May 4, 2021, Butler signed with the Southern Maryland Blue Crabs of the Atlantic League of Professional Baseball. However, the next day, the Kansas City Royals organization purchased Butler's contract and assigned him to the Triple-A Omaha Storm Chasers. Butler made 27 appearances for Omaha, going 7–3 with a 6.01 ERA and 55 strikeouts. On September 8, the Royals released Butler.

=== Southern Maryland Blue Crabs ===
On April 13, 2022, Butler signed with the Southern Maryland Blue Crabs of the Atlantic League of Professional Baseball. Butler started 26 games for the Blue Crabs in 2022, posting a 12–6 record and 4.94 ERA with 94 strikeouts in 155 innings pitched.

=== Charleston Dirty Birds ===
On January 27, 2023, Butler was traded to the Charleston Dirty Birds of the Atlantic League of Professional Baseball in exchange for infielder Jose Rosario. In 3 starts, he struggled to a 9.82 ERA with 8 strikeouts in 11 innings of work. On July 25, Butler was released by Charleston.
