= Kyle Parker =

American baseball player (born 1989)

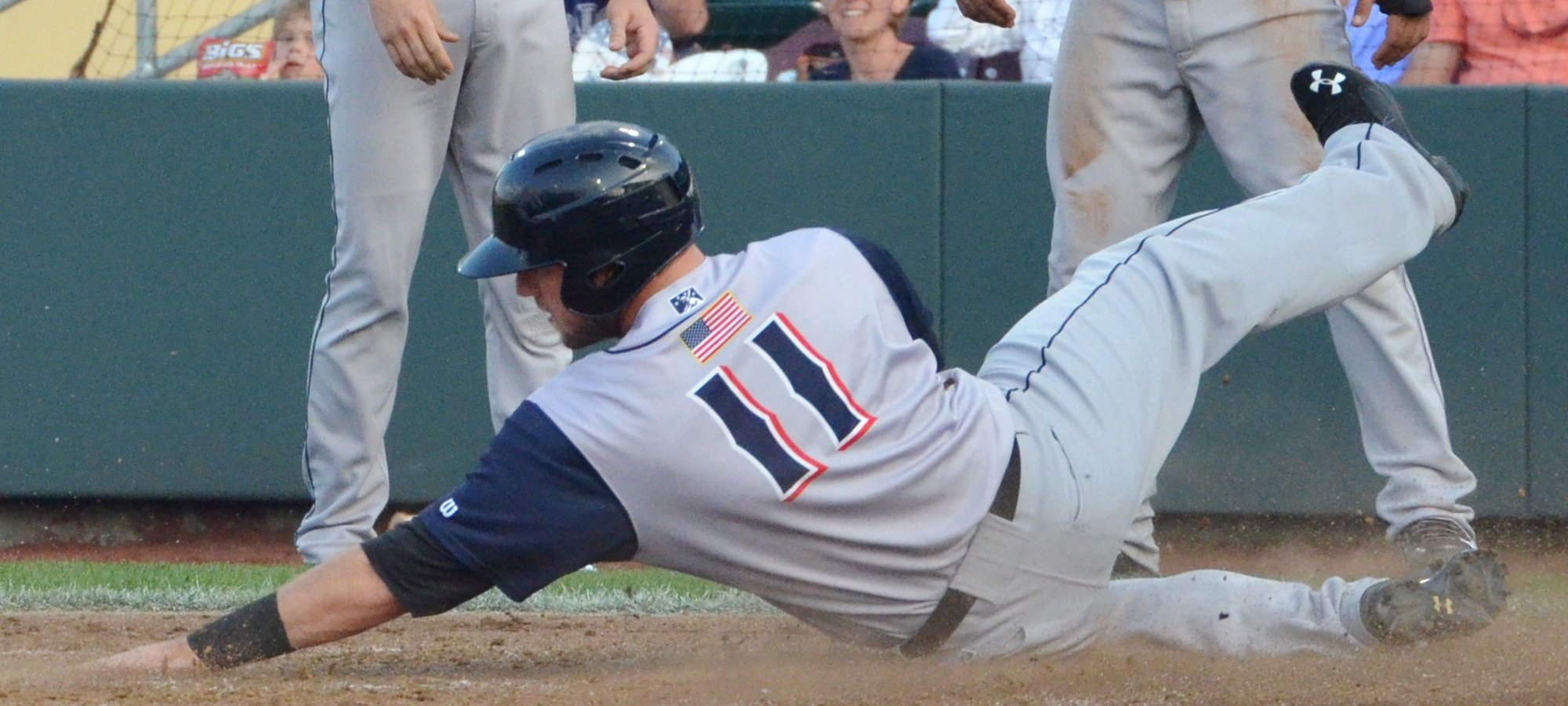
- Parker with the Colorado Springs Sky Sox in 2014
- Outfielder
- Born: September 30, 1989 (age 36); Evans, Georgia, U.S.
- Batted: Right Threw: Right

MLB debut
- June 16, 2014, for the Colorado Rockies

Last MLB appearance
- October 4, 2015, for the Colorado Rockies

MLB statistics
- Batting average: .182
- Home runs: 3
- Runs batted in: 12
- Stats at Baseball Reference

Teams
- Colorado Rockies (2014–2015)

Kyle James Parker (born September 30, 1989) is an American former professional baseball left fielder. Parker was highly regarded during his prep career as both a baseball and football player and chose to attend Clemson University to play both sports. After redshirting during his freshman season, Parker spent the 2009 and 2010 seasons as the starting quarterback for the Clemson Tigers football team. He was also an integral part of the school's baseball team. Parker was drafted by the Colorado Rockies as the 26th overall pick in the 2010 MLB draft and made his Major League Baseball (MLB) debut with them in 2014.

== Early years ==
Parker attended Bartram Trail High School in St. Johns County, Florida. He played both baseball and football and was a highly regarded recruit in both sports. He came out of high school as the #34 overall player in the country and #4 quarterback in the country according to ESPN. Parker first started at quarterback the last five games of his sophomore season where he threw for 870 yards and rushed for 450. In his junior year he threw for 1,850 yards and rushed for 700 while accounting for 27 touchdowns. He was also invited to the Under Armour All-American game, where he threw the game-winning touchdown pass. In baseball, he was a first team all state and county selection his junior season. He did not play his senior season due to him enrolling at Clemson in January 2008 of his senior year.

== College career ==
=== Football ===
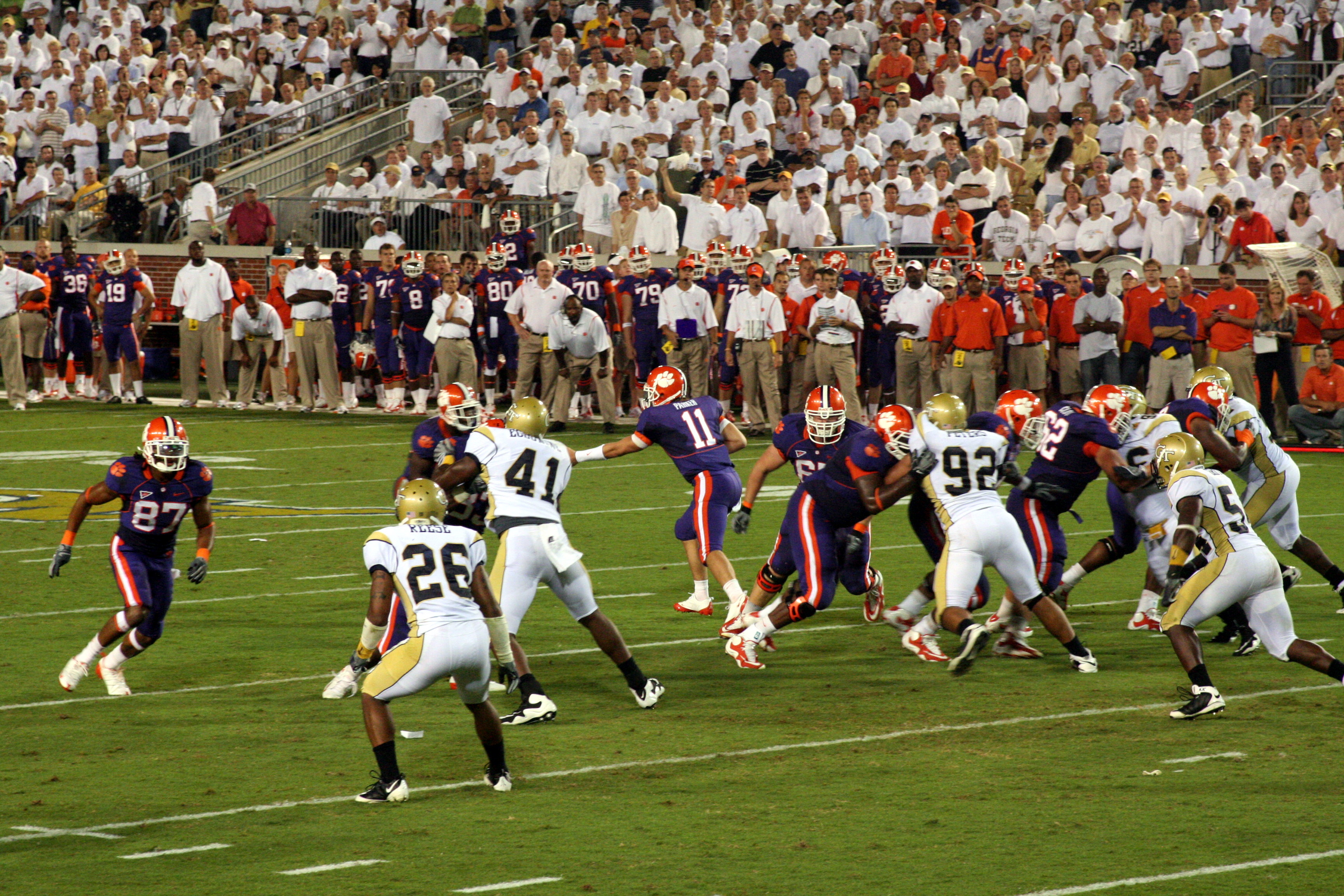
Kyle Parker (#11) handing the ball off, 2009

After spending the 2008 season redshirting, Parker started all 14 of the Tigers' games at quarterback in 2009. He finished the season completing 205 of 369 passes for 2,526 yards with 20 touchdowns and 12 interceptions. The pass completions, passing yards and touchdowns were all Clemson freshman records. He was named a second-team freshman All-American by College Football News and a first-team freshman All-ACC by Sporting News. He guided Clemson to nine wins his freshman year with those numbers. One of those wins was against a top ten team on the road in Miami where he threw three touchdowns. He led the Tigers to 34 points in seven different games. Against N.C. State, Wake Forest and, Middle Tennessee State he was named the team's offensive player of the week. He also had a streak with at least one touchdown pass in seven straight games. He ended up throwing for over 200 yards in five games and had over 200 yards of total offense in seven. He ended the season in seventh in both passing yards and ratings at 180.4 and 124.4 respectively. In Clemson's bowl game he threw for 141 yards and a touchdown in a bowl win over Kentucky. He was the first freshman quarterback to take his team to a conference championship game. He was also the first Clemson freshman to start in a bowl win.

=== Baseball ===
As a freshman in 2008, Parker was a first-team freshman All-American by Baseball America after he hit .303 with 14 home runs and 50 runs batted in in 57 games. He was also a first-team All-ACC selection his freshman year. He led his team in home runs and was second in slugging percentage at .559 and, walks at 32. In ACC play he batted .336 with ten home runs, thirty four RBI and a .441 on-base percentage in 29 ACC games. He was tied for second in home runs, was second in RBI, and fifth in slugging percentage. He had a streak in May where he had an RBI in nine straight games. Parker was named ACC player of the week on April 28. He had five games in that stretch where he batted .375 while scoring six runs, having two doubles, three home runs and twelve RBI. As a junior in 2009, Parker hit .255 with 12 home runs and 52 RBI in 63 games. He started sixty games. Forty nine were in right field and eleven as the designated hitter. In ACC play Parker hit .295 with seven home runs and 23 RBI in 27 games. He also hit a team-high seven times. In the Clemson and South Carolina series he was given the Bob Bradley Award for being Clemson's MVP. He batted .400 with a home run, seven RBI, four runs, and a walk. He was named ACC player of the week again on April 13 for batting .444 with two home runs, eleven RBI, four runs, and three walks. During the season, he had a streak of seven straight hits - one shy of the school record. Parker also had an amazing day on April 11 where he went 3-for-7 with two home runs, five RBI, and three runs in a doubleheader. Earlier that day he played quarterback for the Tigers in the spring football game where he threw 171 yards and a touchdown. Parker was also chosen to the All-ACC preseason team and was ranked as the #32 player in the country. He is also the first Division I athlete ever to throw twenty touchdown passes and hit twenty home runs in the same academic year.

== Professional career ==
=== Colorado Rockies ===
Parker drafted by the Colorado Rockies in the first round of the 2010 Major League Baseball draft. He made his professional debut in 2011 with the Single-A Asheville Tourists, and hit .285/.367/.483 with 21 home runs and 95 RBI in 117 games with the team. In 2012, Parker played for the High-A Modesto Nuts, clubbing 23 home runs and 73 RBI while hitting .308/.415/.562 in 102 games. Parker played in 123 games for the Double-A Tulsa Drillers in 2013, slashing .288/.345/.492 with 23 home runs and 74 RBI. He was added to the Rockies' 40-man roster following the season on November 20, 2013. Parker was assigned to the Triple-A Colorado Springs Sky Sox to begin the 2014 season.

Parker was promoted to the major leagues for the first time on June 16, 2014, and made his MLB debut that day. As a pinch hitter for Ryan Wheeler, Parker struck out against Los Angeles Dodgers reliever J.P. Howell. Parker played in 18 major league games in 2014, going 5-for-26 in 18 games, but hit a much more robust .289/.336/.450 in 128 Triple-A games. In 2015, Parker split time between the Triple-A Albuquerque Isotopes and the major league team. On August 5, 2015, Parker hit his first major league homer, a solo shot off of Seattle Mariners reliever Mayckol Guaipe. Parker finished the 2015 season hitting .280/.326/.431 in 93 games with Albuquerque, but just .179/.223/.311 in 46 games for the Rockies. On January 20, 2016, Parker was designated for assignment following the signing of Gerardo Parra, and was outrighted to Triple-A on January 29. Parker was invited to Spring Training as a non-roster invitee, but was released by the Rockies on April 2, 2016.

=== Cincinnati Reds ===
On April 25, 2016, Parker signed a minor league contract with the Cincinnati Reds. He was assigned to the Double-A Pensacola Blue Wahoos, but hit just .192/.328/.326 with 4 home runs and 14 RBI in 44 games for the club. On June 28, Parker was released by the Reds organization.

== Post-playing career ==
Following his playing career, in July 2017, Parker returned to Clemson to finish his degree, and joined the football team as an assistant coach. Parker shared a house with former Rockies teammate Ben Paulsen while finishing his degree.
