= Ben Paulsen =

American baseball player (born 1987)

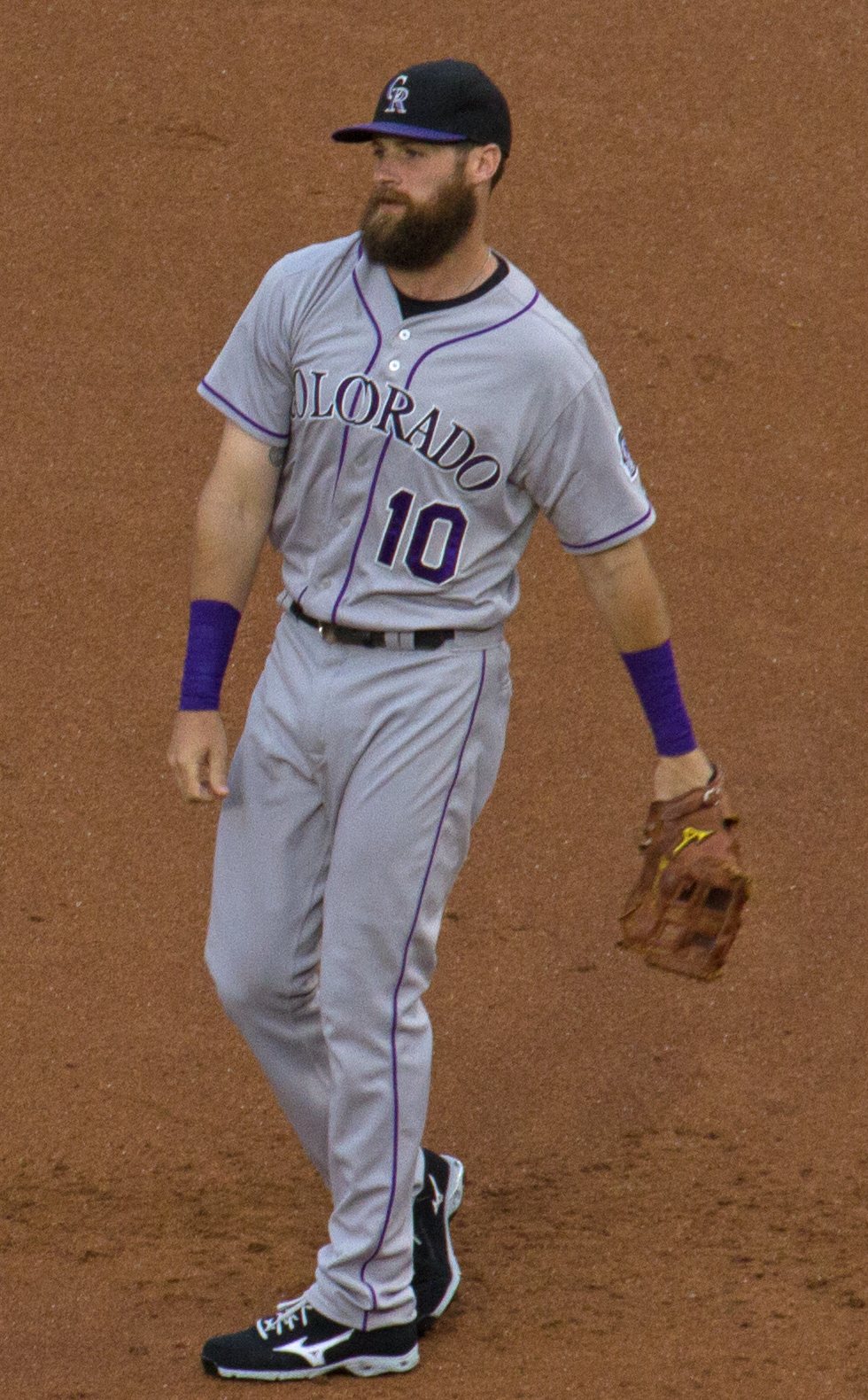
- Paulsen with the Colorado Rockies in 2015
- First baseman / Left fielder
- Born: October 27, 1987 (age 38); Plymouth, Wisconsin, U.S.
- Batted: Left Threw: Right

MLB debut
- July 21, 2014, for the Colorado Rockies

Last MLB appearance
- August 24, 2016, for the Colorado Rockies

MLB statistics
- Batting average: .274
- Home runs: 16
- Runs batted in: 70
- Stats at Baseball Reference

Teams
- Colorado Rockies (2014–2016)

Benjamin Michael Paulsen (born October 27, 1987) is an American former Major League Baseball first baseman and left fielder who played for the Colorado Rockies from 2014 to 2016.

== Amateur career ==
Born in Plymouth, Wisconsin, but raised in Alabama and Georgia, Paulsen attended Kell High School in Marietta, Georgia. Paulsen attended Clemson University alongside future major league teammate Kyle Parker. In 2008, he played collegiate summer baseball with the Hyannis Mets of the Cape Cod Baseball League and was named a league all-star. Paulsen's performance and play improved dramatically during his time at Clemson. 6'3 and weighing only 180 lbs. during his freshman season, Paulsen batted .258 and hit five home runs. However, by the time he was a junior and in his final season, a bigger and stronger Paulsen hit .368 with 11 home runs.

== Professional career ==
=== Colorado Rockies ===
Paulsen was drafted by the Colorado Rockies as a first baseman in the third round of the 2009 Major League Baseball draft. Paulsen was an Arizona Fall League Rising Star in 2011.

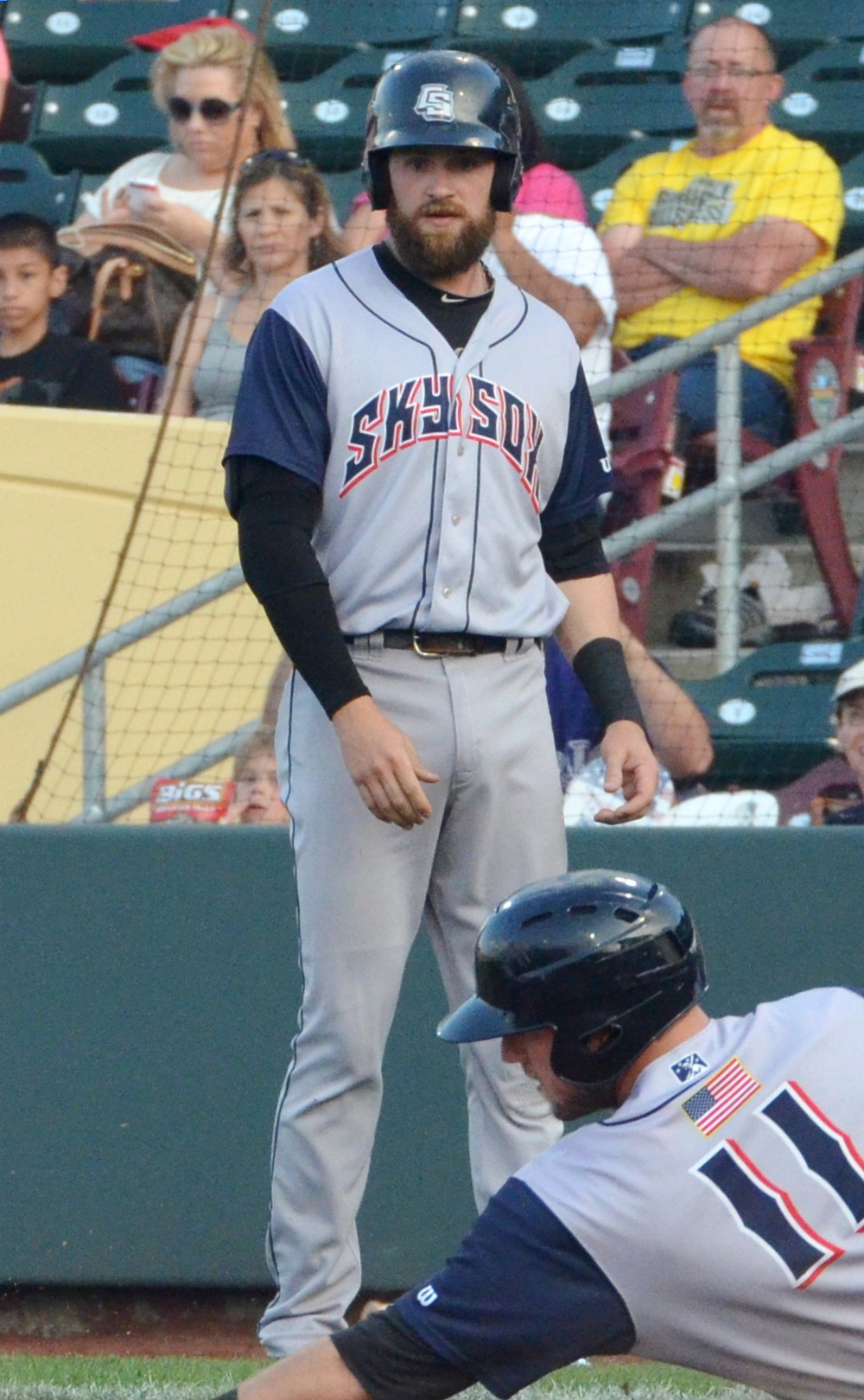
Paulsen during his tenure with the Colorado Springs Sky Sox, triple-A affiliates of the Rockies, in 2014

In 2014, while playing for the Colorado Springs Sky Sox of the Triple–A Pacific Coast League (PCL), Paulsen was named to the PCL team for the Triple-A All-Star Game. The Rockies promoted Paulsen to the majors for the first time on July 21, 2014, and he made his debut that day. However, MLB recognizes Paulsen's official debut as May 22, 2014, as he entered a game against the San Francisco Giants that started that day but was suspended due to rain and resumed on September 1, collecting a single (which counts as his first big league hit) in his only at-bat. Paulsen finished the 2014 season with a slash line of .317/.348/.571 in 66 plate appearances, hitting 4 home runs and driving in 10.

Paulsen played in 39 games for Colorado in 2016, hitting .217/.258/.304 with one home run and 11 RBI. On September 6, 2016, Paulsen was designated for assignment by the Rockies. He cleared waivers and was sent outright to the Triple–A Albuquerque Isotopes on September 8. Paulsen elected free agency following the season on November 7.

=== Minnesota Twins ===
On December 3, 2016, Paulsen signed a minor league contract with the Minnesota Twins. In 22 games for the Triple–A Rochester Red Wings, he hit .230/.279/.432 with three home runs and 12 RBI. On May 15, 2017, Paulsen was released by the Twins organization.

== Post-playing career ==
In July 2017, Paulsen returned to Clemson to finish his degree, also joining the baseball team as an assistant coach. Paulsen shared a house with former Rockies teammate Kyle Parker while finishing his degree.
