= Blake Doyle =

American baseball coach

Blake R. Doyle (born January 26, 1954) is an American former professional baseball player and coach. He was the hitting coach of the Colorado Rockies from 2013 to 2016.

Doyle was drafted by the Baltimore Orioles in the fourth round of the 1972 Major League Baseball draft out of Caverna High School in Horse Cave, Kentucky. He played in the minors until 1980 for the Orioles and Cincinnati Reds organizations.

He was named the Rockies hitting coach on November 26, 2013. He was fired after the 2016 season.

His older brother, Denny and his twin brother Brian, both played in Major League Baseball.

In 1978, the three established the Doyle Baseball Camp located in Lakeland, Florida. The camp has graduated many current Major League Baseball Players and is based at the Detroit Tigers Spring Training Facility, where they hold many camp sessions per year.
