= Tyler Matzek =

American baseball player (born 1990)

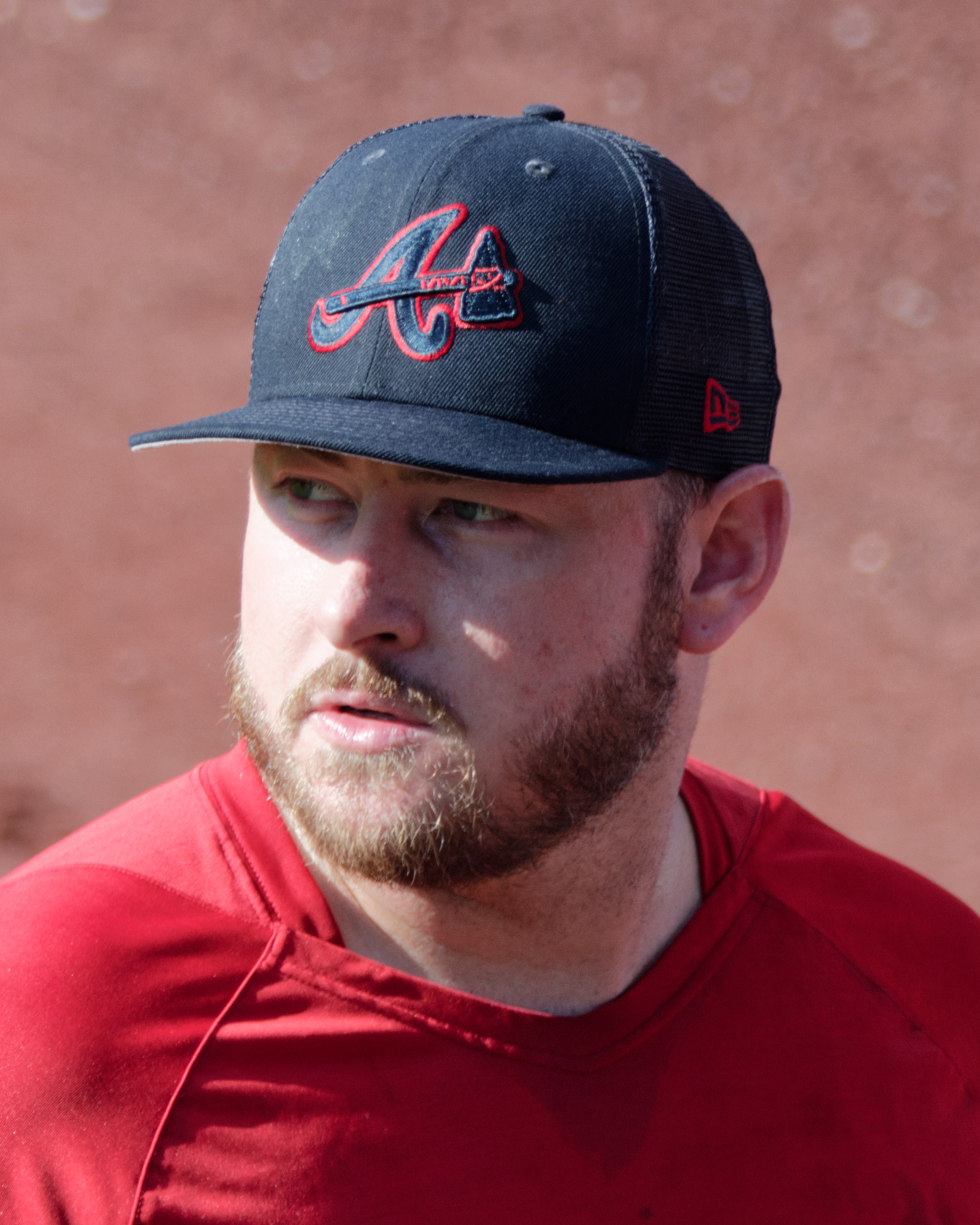
- Matzek with the Braves in 2022

Free agent
- Pitcher
- Born: October 19, 1990 (age 36); Mission Viejo, California, U.S.
- Bats: Left Throws: Left

MLB debut
- June 11, 2014, for the Colorado Rockies

MLB statistics (through 2025 season)
- Win–loss record: 16–21
- Earned run average: 3.73
- Strikeouts: 279
- Stats at Baseball Reference

Teams
- Colorado Rockies (2014–2015); Atlanta Braves (2020–2022, 2024); New York Yankees (2025)

Career highlights and awards
- World Series champion (2021)

Tyler Alexander Matzek (born October 19, 1990) is an American professional baseball pitcher who is a free agent. He has previously played in Major League Baseball (MLB) for the Colorado Rockies, Atlanta Braves, and New York Yankees.

The Rockies selected Matzek in the first round of the 2009 MLB draft, and he made his MLB debut in 2014. He did not play in the major leagues after 2015 until he pitched for the Braves in 2020. Matzek was a member of the 2021 World Series champions with Atlanta.

== Career ==
=== Amateur career ===
Matzek played baseball at Capistrano Valley High School in Mission Viejo, California, where he was a teammate of future big leaguer Kyle Hendricks. He struck out 102 in 86 2/3 innings pitched with an 0.97 earned run average (ERA) his senior year, leading his team to the California Interscholastic Federation (CIF) championship and earning the CIF Orange County Player of the Year. He was drafted by the Colorado Rockies in the first round, 11th overall, in the 2009 Major League Baseball draft.

=== Colorado Rockies ===
On August 17, 2009, Matzek agreed to a $3.9 million signing bonus to join the Colorado Rockies organization. He did not pitch professionally in 2009.

Prior to the 2010 season he was ranked by Baseball America as the 23rd best prospect in baseball. Playing for the Single-A Asheville Tourists, he compiled a win–loss record of 5–1 with a 2.92 ERA and 88 strikeouts in 89 1/3 innings of work over 18 starts. However, he struggled with control, walking 62 and hitting 4 batters. Prior to 2011 Baseball America ranked him as the 32nd best prospect. He started the season with the High-A Modesto Nuts, but struggled mightily, going 0-3 with a 9.82 ERA with 46 walks in 33 innings. He was demoted back to Asheville, where he made three rather unsuccessful starts before going on a "little mental break" after his start on June 17. He returned to Asheville on July 20 to finish the season. He went 5-4 with a 4.36 ERA with the Tourists in 2011, striking out 74 and walking 50 in 64 innings.

Matzek started the 2012 season with Modesto. He was a mid-season All-Star in the California League, going 4-3 with a 3.24 ERA before the break, striking out 83 and walking 52 in 75 innings. His second half was slightly worse than the first, and he finished 2012 going 6-8 with a 4.62 ERA, striking out a league-leading 153 and walking a league-leading 95. In 2013, he pitched for the Double-A Tulsa Drillers. He was also a mid-season All-Star in the Texas League, going 3-6 with a 4.04 ERA before the break, striking out 55 and walking 40 in 75 2/3 innings. His second half was slightly better this year, and he finished 2013 with the Drillers 8-9 with a 3.79 ERA, striking out 95 and walking 76 in 142 1/3 innings. After the year, Matzek pitched for the Salt River Rafters of the Arizona Fall League, where in 10 games of relief, he went 1-1 with a 3.86 ERA and a 1.457 WHIP, earning him a selection to the AFL Fall Stars Game. Matzek was added to the Rockies 40-man roster on November 20, 2013. He started the 2014 season with the Triple-A Colorado Springs Sky Sox. He made 12 starts for the SkySox before earning his first promotion to the major leagues, going 5-4 with a 4.05 ERA, striking out 61 and walking 31 in 66 2/3 innings.

Matzek was promoted to the Colorado Rockies on June 11, 2014, to replace Eddie Butler, who went on the disabled-list after his major league debut. Matzek made his major league debut that day, giving up two runs on five hits with seven strikeouts and no walks in seven innings in an 8-2 victory against the Atlanta Braves. He also recorded his first hit off of Julio Teherán, an infield-single in the 7th inning, and he later scored. Matzek got his first career complete game shutout September 5, 2014 vs the San Diego Padres. In the game, he gave up three hits and the Rockies won the game 3-0. At the end of the season, Matzek won 6 games while losing 11 in 19 starts.

Matzek began the 2015 season in the Rockies rotation, but after experiencing control problems he was sent down to Triple-A. He would spend the rest of the season in Triple-A. Matzek began the 2016 season on the disabled list, and spent the entirety of the season with Modesto and the Double–A Hartford Yard Goats. On June 26, 2016, Matzek was removed from the 40–man roster after clearing outright waivers. In 33 relief outings split between the two affiliates, he struggled to a 6.75 ERA with 33 strikeouts across 26 2/3 innings pitched. Matzek elected free agency following the season on November 7.

On March 13, 2017, Matzek signed a minor league contract with the Chicago White Sox. He was released by the team on March 28. After leaving the White Sox organization, Matzek did not play professionally in 2017.

On February 10, 2018, Matzek signed a minor league contract with the Seattle Mariners organization. He was released by Seattle prior to the season on March 30.

=== Texas AirHogs ===
On April 12, 2018, Matzek signed with the Texas AirHogs of the independent American Association. In 88 2/3 innings, he struck out 93 batters but walked 66 batters.

=== Arizona Diamondbacks ===
On January 15, 2019, Matzek signed a minor league contract with the Arizona Diamondbacks following a showcase with Driveline baseball. He was released on May 16, 2019.

=== Texas AirHogs (second stint) ===
On June 9, 2019, Matzek signed with the Texas AirHogs of the American Association. He had a 2.64 ERA and 53 strikeouts in 30 2/3 innings pitched.

=== Atlanta Braves ===
On August 14, 2019, Matzek's contract was purchased by the Atlanta Braves. Matzek began his stint with the Mississippi Braves, their Double-A affiliate. After just one appearance in which he pitched 2 1/3 innings and had five strikeouts, Matzek was promoted to the Braves Triple-A affiliate, the Gwinnett Stripers.

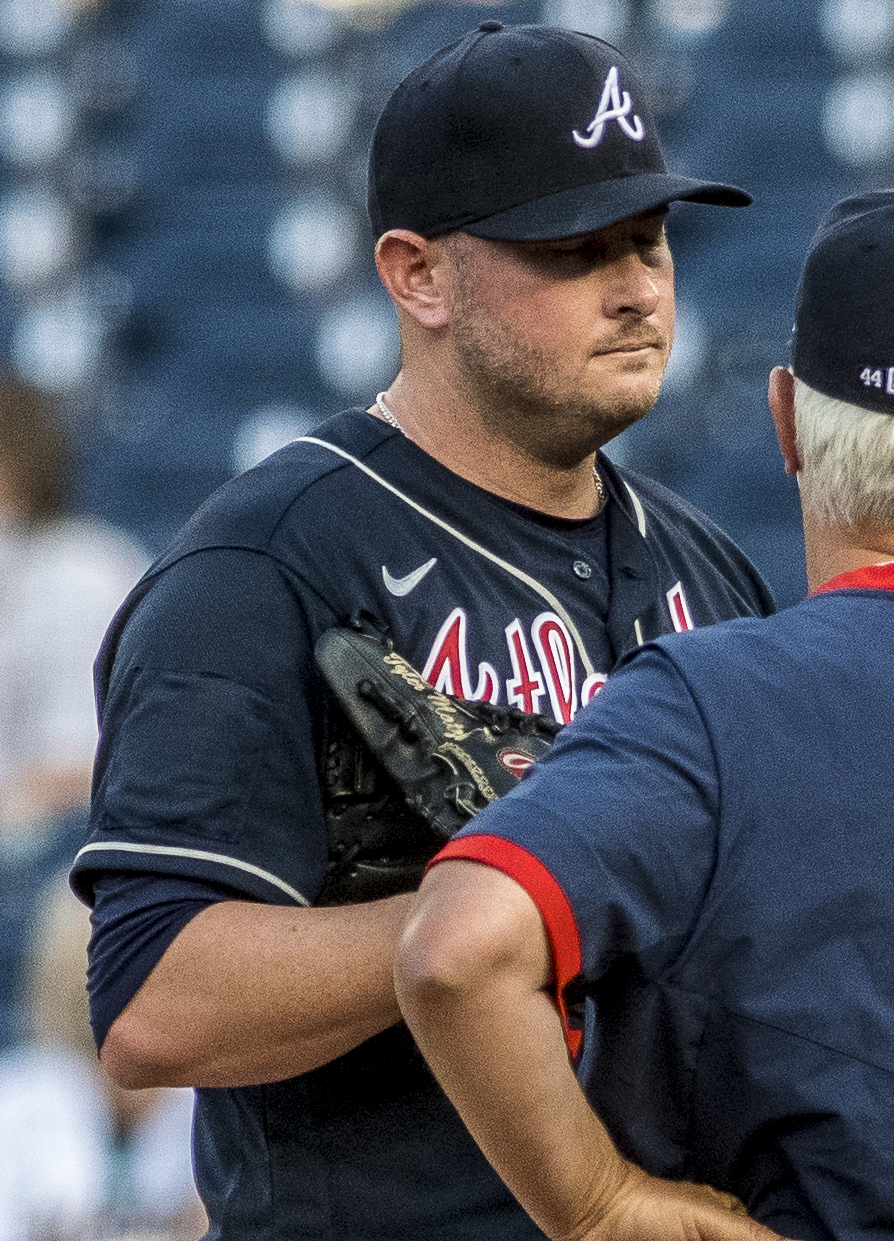
Matzek in 2021

For the 2020 season, Matzek made the Opening Day roster, marking his first appearance in the majors since 2015. In 2020 he was 4-3 with a 2.79 ERA in 21 relief appearances covering 29 innings in which he struck out 43 batters.

In 2021 he was 0–4 with a 2.57 ERA in 69 relief appearances in which he pitched 63 innings and struck out 77 batters. In Game 6 of the 2021 NLCS against the Los Angeles Dodgers, Matzek picked up the win with two perfect innings and four strikeouts. Matzek entered the game in a no-out jam with runners on second and third and struck out the side as the Braves clinched their first pennant since 1999. Matzek was a relief pitcher in Game 6 of the 2021 World Series, which Atlanta won to clinch the title.

Matzek began the 2022 season with 13 relief appearances in which he went 0–1 with a 5.06 ERA. On May 17, the Braves placed him on the injured list due to shoulder inflammation. Matzek did not return to the team until July 4. On August 9, Matzek recorded his first career save after pitching a scoreless 11th inning against the Boston Red Sox.

Having been left off of the roster for the 2022 NLDS due to elbow discomfort, Braves manager Brian Snitker announced on October 12, a few hours prior to Game 2, that Matzek would undergo Tommy John surgery, sidelining him for the remainder of the postseason.

On November 18, 2022, the Braves signed Matzek to a 2-year, $3.1 million contract extension with a club option for 2025. He did not appear in a game in 2023 as he continued to recover from surgery. Matzek began the 2024 campaign with Atlanta, but struggled to a 9.90 ERA with 10 strikeouts across 11 appearances. He was placed on the injured list with left elbow inflammation on May 7, and was transferred to the 60–day injured list on June 4.

=== San Francisco Giants ===
On July 29, 2024, Matzek and minor league infielder Sabin Ceballos were traded to the San Francisco Giants in exchange for Jorge Soler and Luke Jackson. He made five rehab outings for the Triple–A Sacramento River Cats, posting a 5.79 ERA with 3 strikeouts. Matzek was released by the Giants on August 30.

=== Atlanta Braves (second stint) ===
On August 31, 2024, Matzek signed a minor league contract to return to the Atlanta Braves organization. In 4 games for the Triple-A Gwinnett Stripers, he logged a 4.76 ERA with 5 strikeouts across 5 2/3 innings pitched. Matzek elected free agency following the season on November 4.

=== New York Yankees ===
On February 10, 2025, Matzek signed a minor league contract with the New York Yankees. He began the year with the Triple-A Scranton/Wilkes-Barre RailRiders. On April 22, the Yankees selected Matzek's contract, adding him to their active roster. In seven appearances for New York, he recorded a 4.26 ERA with seven strikeouts over 6 1/3 innings pitched. Matzek was designated for assignment on May 16. He elected to become a free agent on May 19, rather than accept an outright assignment to Scranton.

=== St. Louis Cardinals ===
On June 3, 2025, Matzek signed a minor league contract with the St. Louis Cardinals. He was released by the Cardinals on June 15, and was re-signed to a new minor league contract on June 19. Matzek did not make an appearance for the organization, and elected free agency following the season on November 6.

== Personal life ==
Matzek is married to Lauren, whom he met in high school. She underwent cancer treatment in 2017, while convincing Tyler to continue his professional baseball career, despite the yips that frustrated both Matzek and his catching partner, his younger brother Kyle. Through Michael McKenry, Matzek met Jason Kuhn, a former collegiate baseball player and Navy SEAL who trained Matzek.
