= Jason Gurka =

American baseball player (born 1988)

- Pitcher
- Born: January 10, 1988 (age 38); Houston, Texas, U.S.
- Batted: Left Threw: Left

MLB debut
- August 29, 2015, for the Colorado Rockies

Last MLB appearance
- September 4, 2017, for the Los Angeles Angels

MLB statistics
- Win–loss record: 0–0
- Earned run average: 9.00
- Strikeouts: 14
- Stats at Baseball Reference

Teams
- Colorado Rockies (2015–2016); Los Angeles Angels (2017)

Jason Isidore Gurka (born January 10, 1988) is an American former professional baseball pitcher. He played in Major League Baseball (MLB) for the Colorado Rockies and Los Angeles Angels.

== Career ==
=== Baltimore Orioles ===
Gurka was drafted by the Baltimore Orioles in the 15th round, with the 446th overall selection, of the 2008 Major League Baseball draft. He made his professional debut with the rookie–level Bluefield Orioles. Gurka did not make an appearance in 2009 and became a free agent following the season.

Gurka re–signed with the organization on a minor league deal on June 17, 2010. He finished the year with the Low–A Aberdeen IronBirds, logging a 4.93 ERA in 22 games. Gurka split the 2011 season between the Single–A Delmarva Shorebirds and High–A Frederick Keys. In 33 appearances for the two affiliates, he accumulated a 2.87 ERA with 67 strikeouts across 53 1/3 innings pitched.

Gurka split the 2012 campaign between Frederick and the Double–A Bowie Baysox. In 32 total games, he recorded a 3–5 record and 2.62 ERA with 65 strikeouts across 65 1/3 innings. Gurka spent the entirety of 2013 with Bowie, posting a 2.95 ERA with 46 strikeouts and 4 saves in 20 games out of the bullpen.

Gurka remained with Bowie for the 2014 campaign, receiving a late–season cup of coffee with the Triple–A Norfolk Tides. In 30 outings for Bowie, he compiled a 3–1 record and 2.38 ERA with 60 strikeouts across 64 1/3 innings pitched. Gurka elected free agency following the season.

=== Colorado Rockies ===
Gurka signed a minor league deal with the Colorado Rockies on December 16, 2014. Gurka was promoted to the major leagues for the first time on August 28, 2015. He replaced Carlos Gonzalez in right field in the bottom of the sixteenth inning against the Los Angeles Dodgers on September 16. In 9 appearances during his rookie campaign, Gurka struggled to a 9.39 ERA with 7 strikeouts across 7 2/3 innings pitched. On December 2, 2015, the Rockies non–tendered Gurka, making him a free agent.

On December 15, 2015, the Rockies re-signed Gurka to a minor league deal. His contract was selected to the majors on April 3, 2016. In six appearances, Gurka struggled to a 9.31 ERA with 7 strikeouts over 9 2/3 innings of work. Gurka was released by the Rockies organization on August 20.

=== New York Yankees ===
On December 12, 2016, Gurka signed a minor league deal with the New York Yankees. He was assigned to the Scranton/Wilkes-Barre RailRiders. The Yankees released Gurka on June 2, 2017.

=== Los Angeles Angels ===
On June 5, 2017, Gurka signed a minor league contract with the Los Angeles Angels. On September 1, the Angels selected Gurka's contract. On October 9, the Angels designated him for assignment. He elected free agency on November 6, 2017.

=== Baltimore Orioles (second stint) ===
Gurka signed a minor league contract with the Baltimore Orioles on December 1, 2017. In 16 games for the Triple–A Norfolk Tides, he logged a 3.18 ERA with 24 strikeouts across 22 2/3 innings pitched. Gurka was released from the organization on June 10, 2018.

=== Acereros de Monclova ===
On June 22, 2018, Gurka signed with the Acereros de Monclova of the Mexican League. Gurka did not play in a game in 2020 due to the cancellation of the Mexican League season because of the COVID-19 pandemic.

=== Mariachis de Guadalajara ===
On March 29, 2021, Gurka was traded to the Mariachis de Guadalajara of the Mexican League. He became a free agent after the 2022 season.
