= Brooks Brown (baseball) =

American baseball player (born 1985)

- Pitcher
- Born: June 20, 1985 (age 41); Statesboro, Georgia, U.S.
- Batted: Left Threw: Right

MLB debut
- July 6, 2014, for the Colorado Rockies

Last MLB appearance
- October 2, 2015, for the Colorado Rockies

MLB statistics
- Win–loss record: 1–4
- Earned run average: 3.97
- Strikeouts: 41
- Stats at Baseball Reference

Teams
- Colorado Rockies (2014–2015)

Brooks Steven Brown (born June 20, 1985) is an American former professional baseball pitcher. He played in Major League Baseball (MLB) for the Colorado Rockies from 2014 to 2015.

== Career ==
=== Amateur ===
Brown was drafted by the Atlanta Braves in the 21st round of the 2003 Major League Baseball draft out of Portal High School in Portal, Georgia. He did not sign and attended the University of Georgia and played college baseball for the Georgia Bulldogs. In 2005, he played collegiate summer baseball with the Chatham A's of the Cape Cod Baseball League.

=== Arizona Diamondbacks ===
He was drafted by the Arizona Diamondbacks in the first round of the 2006 Major League Baseball draft.

=== Detroit Tigers ===
On April 2, 2009, Brown was traded from the Diamondbacks to the Detroit Tigers in exchange for James Skelton.

=== Pittsburgh Pirates ===
In November 2012 he signed a minor league deal with the Pittsburgh Pirates.

=== Colorado Rockies ===
On November 15, 2013, Brown signed a minor league contract with the Colorado Rockies organization. Brown was called up to the majors for the first time on July 6, 2014, following an injury to Nick Masset. He made 26 appearances during his rookie campaign, posting a 2.77 ERA with 21 strikeouts across 26 innings pitched.

Brown made 36 appearances out of the bullpen for Colorado in 2015, compiling a 1–3 record and 4.91 ERA with 20 strikeouts across 33 innings pitched.

=== Los Angeles Dodgers ===
On October 14, 2015, Brown was claimed off waivers by the Los Angeles Dodgers. On December 4, he was removed from the 40-man roster and sent outright to the Triple–A Oklahoma City Dodgers. Brown was given a non–roster invitation to spring training, but he did not make the team and was released by the organization on February 26, 2016.
