= Ryan Wheeler =

American baseball player (born 1988)

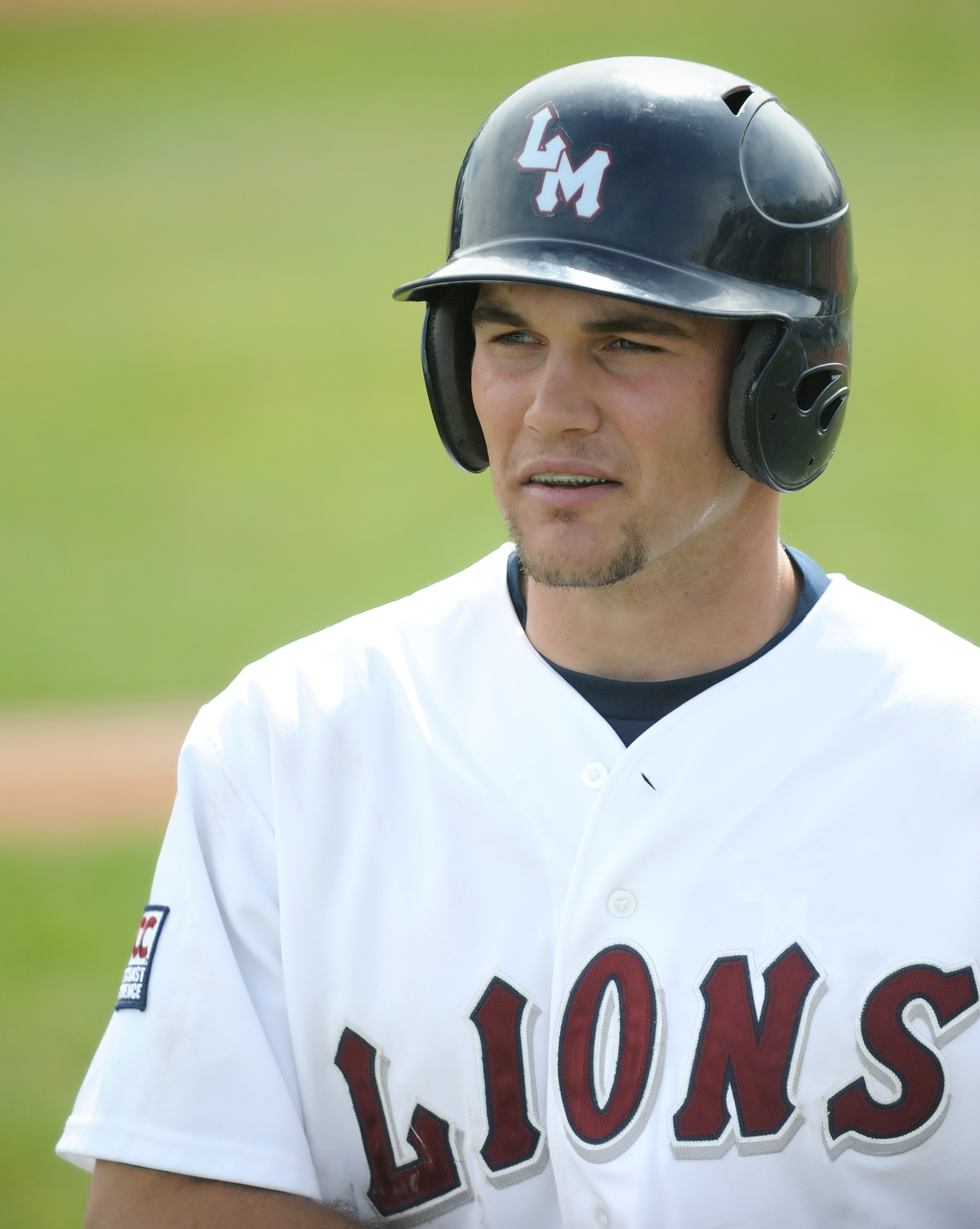
- Wheeler with Loyola Marymount in 2009
- Third baseman
- Born: July 10, 1988 (age 38); Torrance, California, U.S.
- Batted: Left Threw: Right

MLB debut
- July 20, 2012, for the Arizona Diamondbacks

Last appearance
- July 4, 2014, for the Colorado Rockies

MLB statistics
- Batting average: .233
- Home runs: 3
- Runs batted in: 30
- Stats at Baseball Reference

Teams
- Arizona Diamondbacks (2012); Colorado Rockies (2013–2014)

Ryan Wayne Wheeler (born July 10, 1988) is an American former professional baseball third baseman. He has played in Major League Baseball (MLB) for the Arizona Diamondbacks and Colorado Rockies.

== Career ==
=== Amateur ===
Wheeler attended Loyola Marymount University in Los Angeles, California. In 2008, he played collegiate summer baseball with the Brewster Whitecaps of the Cape Cod Baseball League and was named a league all-star.

=== Arizona Diamondbacks ===
The Arizona Diamondbacks drafted Wheeler in the fifth round of the 2009 MLB draft. MLB.com rated Wheeler the 18th best prospect in the Diamondbacks' organization heading into the 2012 season. Wheeler was named the PCL's Offensive Player of the Week for the week ending April 29.

On July 20, 2012, he was called up for the first time by the Diamondbacks.

=== Colorado Rockies ===
Wheeler was traded to the Colorado Rockies on November 20, 2012, in exchange for Matt Reynolds. He was designated for assignment by the Rockies on July 31, 2014.

=== Los Angeles Angels of Anaheim ===
Wheeler was claimed off waivers by the Los Angeles Angels of Anaheim on August 2, 2014. The Angels designated him for assignment on September 8. He was released on May 9, 2015.

=== Minnesota Twins ===
Wheeler signed a minor league deal with the Minnesota Twins on May 15, 2015. He was released on July 1, 2015.

== Personal life ==
His brother, Jason Wheeler, currently is a free agent. In January 2016, he married Kelsey Moore, Miss Texas USA 2010 and a former volleyball player at UTEP.
