= Christian Bergman =

American baseball pitcher (born 1988)

- Pitcher
- Born: May 4, 1988 (age 38); Glendale, California, U.S.
- Batted: Right Threw: Right

MLB debut
- June 9, 2014, for the Colorado Rockies

Last MLB appearance
- August 17, 2018, for the Seattle Mariners

MLB statistics
- Win–loss record: 11-15
- Earned run average: 5.59
- Strikeouts: 130
- Stats at Baseball Reference

Teams
- Colorado Rockies (2014–2016); Seattle Mariners (2017–2018)

Christian Stanford Bergman (born May 4, 1988) is an American former professional baseball pitcher. He played in Major League Baseball (MLB) for the Colorado Rockies and Seattle Mariners.

== Amateur career ==
Bergman attended St. Francis High School in La Canada, California, where he pitched and also played shortstop and third base. As a senior, Bergman went 10–2 with a 1.54 ERA, and also batted .343. After high school, Bergman attended the University of California, Irvine. As a freshman, Bergman went 0–4 with a 4.98 ERA. Bergman improved as a sophomore, going 5–2, compiling a 1.94 ERA, and a 0.64 ERA in conference play. During his junior season, Bergman held a record of 9-3 and had an ERA of 3.50. Bergman also went 9–3 with a 3.72 ERA as a senior.

== Professional career ==
=== Colorado Rockies ===
Bergman was drafted by the Colorado Rockies in the 24th round of the 2010 Major League Baseball draft out of University of California, Irvine. He was called up on June 9, 2014, and made his major league debut the same day. He got his first career win August 24, 2014 vs. the Miami Marlins. He pitched 6 1/3 innings and gave up 4 runs. The Rockies won the game 7–4. Bergman started 10 games for the Rockies, going 3–5 with a 5.93 ERA.

In 2015, Bergman pitched mainly out of the bullpen while also spot starting in 4 games for the Rockies.

Bergman made 15 appearances for Colorado in 2016, struggling to an 8.39 ERA with 22 strikeouts over 24 2/3 innings pitched. On October 12, 2016, he was removed from the 40–man roster and sent outright to the Triple-A Albuquerque Isotopes. Bergman elected free agency following the season on November 7, 2016.

=== Seattle Mariners ===
On December 1, 2016, Bergman signed a minor league contract with the Seattle Mariners. He had his contract selected to the major league roster on May 7, 2017. He was sent outright to Triple-A Tacoma Rainiers on August 4. He had his contract selected to the major league roster a second time on August 12. He was designated for assignment on August 15, he cleared waivers and was sent outright to Triple-A Tacoma Rainiers the next day. He had his contract selected to the major league roster a third time on August 28. For a third time he was sent outright to Triple-A Tacoma Rainiers on September 1. He elected free agency following the season on October 2.

Bergman re-signed with the Mariners organization on a new minor league contract on January 16, 2018. He had his contract selected to the major league roster on May 16. He was sent outright to Triple-A Tacoma Rainiers on September 1. He elected free agency on October 2.

On January 23, 2019, Bergman signed a minor league contract with the Chicago Cubs. He was released on March 20.

On April 15, 2019, Bergman signed with the Sugar Land Skeeters of the Atlantic League of Professional Baseball. The following day, prior to the start of the ALPB season, his contract was purchased by the Seattle Mariners. He was released by Sugar Land on May 30.

=== Sugar Land Skeeters ===
On June 10, 2019, Bergman signed back with the Sugar Land Skeeters of the Atlantic League of Professional Baseball. In 5 starts, he struggled to an 0–2 record and 8.53 ERA with 11 strikeouts across 19 innings. Bergman was released by the Skeeters on July 12.
