= 2014 San Francisco Giants season =

Major League Baseball season

2014 San Francisco Giants
- World Series champions National League champions National League Wild Card winners
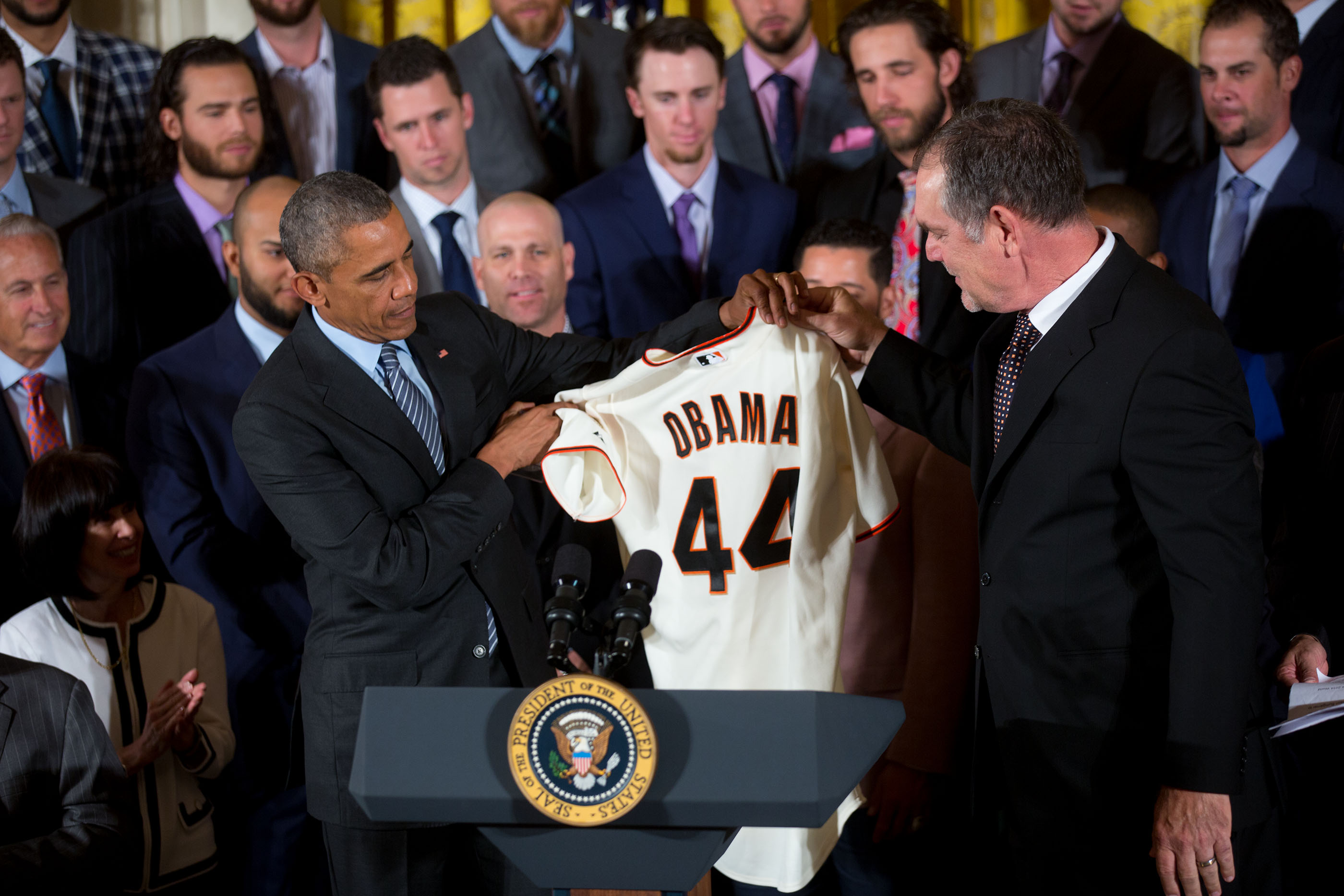
- President Barack Obama meets with The 2014 World Series champion San Francisco Giants at the White House
- League: National League
- Division: West
- Ballpark: AT&T Park
- City: San Francisco, California
- Record: 88–74 (.543)
- Divisional place: 2nd
- Owners: Larry Baer (managing general partner)
- General managers: Brian Sabean
- Managers: Bruce Bochy
- Television: KNTV (Jon Miller, Mike Krukow, Duane Kuiper); CSN Bay Area (Duane Kuiper, Mike Krukow, Dave Flemming, Jon Miller)
- Radio: KNBR (Jon Miller, Dave Flemming, Duane Kuiper, Mike Krukow); KTRB (Spanish) (Erwin Higueros, Tito Fuentes)
- Stats: ESPN.com; Baseball Reference

The 2014 San Francisco Giants season was the Giants' 132nd year in Major League Baseball, their 57th year in San Francisco since their move from New York following the 1957 season, and their 15th at AT&T Park. The Giants finished the season in second place in the National League West, but qualified for the playoffs and defeated the Pittsburgh Pirates in the NLWC Game and the Washington Nationals in the NLDS. They defeated the St. Louis Cardinals in the NLCS in five games and beat the Kansas City Royals in seven games in the World Series, their third World Series win in five years.

== Season standings ==
=== National League West ===
NL West
Team	W	L	Pct.	GB	Home	Road
Los Angeles Dodgers	94	68	.580	—	45‍–‍36	49‍–‍32
San Francisco Giants	88	74	.543	6	45‍–‍36	43‍–‍38
San Diego Padres	77	85	.475	17	48‍–‍33	29‍–‍52
Colorado Rockies	66	96	.407	28	45‍–‍36	21‍–‍60
Arizona Diamondbacks	64	98	.395	30	33‍–‍48	31‍–‍50

=== National League Wild Card ===
Division leaders
Team	W	L	Pct.
Washington Nationals	96	66	.593
Los Angeles Dodgers	94	68	.580
St. Louis Cardinals	90	72	.556

Wild Card teams (Top 2 teams qualify for postseason)
Team	W	L	Pct.	GB
Pittsburgh Pirates	88	74	.543	—
San Francisco Giants	88	74	.543	—
Milwaukee Brewers	82	80	.506	6
New York Mets	79	83	.488	9
Atlanta Braves	79	83	.488	9
Miami Marlins	77	85	.475	11
San Diego Padres	77	85	.475	11
Cincinnati Reds	76	86	.469	12
Philadelphia Phillies	73	89	.451	15
Chicago Cubs	73	89	.451	15
Colorado Rockies	66	96	.407	22
Arizona Diamondbacks	64	98	.395	24

== Record vs. opponents ==
2014 National League record Source: MLB Standings Grid – 2014
Team	AZ	ATL	CHC	CIN	COL	LAD	MIA	MIL	NYM	PHI	PIT	SD	SF	STL	WSH	AL
Arizona	–	3–3	5–2	3–4	9–10	4–15	3–4	3–4	2–4	2–4	3–4	12–7	6–13	1–5	1–6	7–13
Atlanta	3–3	–	5–1	5–2	4–3	1–6	9–10	5–2	9–10	11–8	3–4	3–4	1–5	2–4	11–8	7–13
Chicago	2–5	1–5	–	8–11	5–2	3–4	4–2	11–8	5–2	3–3	5–14	3–4	2–4	9–10	3–4	9–11
Cincinnati	4–3	2–5	11–8	–	3–4	3–4	4–3	10–9	2–4	3–3	12–7	1–5	5–2	7–12	3–3	6–14
Colorado	10–9	3–4	2–5	4–3	–	6–13	3–4	1–6	3–4	3–3	2–4	10–9	10–9	1–5	1–5	7–13
Los Angeles	15–4	6–1	4–3	4–3	13–6	–	3–3	1–5	4–2	3–4	2–5	12–7	10–9	4–3	2–4	11–9
Miami	4–3	10–9	2–4	3–4	4–3	3–3	–	3–4	8–11	9–10	2–4	3–4	3–4	4–2	6–13	13–7
Milwaukee	4–3	2–5	8–11	9–10	6–1	5–1	4–3	–	4–3	3–4	12–7	3–3	2–4	7–12	2–4	11–9
New York	4–2	10–9	2–5	4–2	4–3	2–4	11–8	3–4	–	13–6	3–4	3–3	1–6	4–3	4–15	11–9
Philadelphia	4–2	8–11	3–3	3–3	3–3	4–3	10–9	4–3	6–13	–	1–6	4–3	2–5	4–3	10–9	7–13
Pittsburgh	4–3	4–3	14–5	7–12	4–2	5–2	4–2	7–12	4–3	6–1	–	3–3	4–2	8–11	3–4	11–9
San Diego	7–12	4–3	4–3	5–1	9–10	7–12	4–3	3–3	3–3	3–4	3–3	–	10–9	3–4	3–4	9–11
San Francisco	13–6	5–1	4–2	2–5	9–10	9–10	4–3	4–2	6–1	5–2	2–4	9–10	–	4–3	2–5	10–10
St. Louis	5–1	4–2	10–9	12–7	5–1	3–4	2–4	12–7	3–4	3–4	11–8	4–3	3–4	–	5–2	8–12
Washington	6–1	8–11	4–3	3–3	5–1	4–2	13–6	4–2	15–4	9–10	4–3	4–3	5–2	2–5	–	10–10

== Events ==
- November 2, 2013 – The Giants decline to exercise options on LHP Barry Zito and OF Andrés Torres, allowing them to become free agents.
- November 4, 2013 – The Giants decline to exercise an option on RHP Ryan Vogelsong, allowing him to become a free agent.
- November 18, 2013 – Free agent RHP Tim Hudson signs a 2-year contract with the Giants.
- November 26, 2013 – Free agent LHP Javier López has re-signed with the Giants with a 3-year contract.
- November 29, 2013 – The Giants re-sign RHP Ryan Vogelsong to a 1-year contract.
- December 12, 2013 – The Giants sign free agent OF Michael Morse to a 1-year contract.
- January 17, 2014 – The Giants avoid arbitration with OF Gregor Blanco, RHP Yusmeiro Petit and IF Tony Abreu by signing one year deals.
- February 18, 2014 – Hours before an arbitration hearing was set to be held, the Giants and IF Brandon Belt come to terms on a one-year deal, ensuring the Giants avoid hearings with all their arbitration-eligible players.
- March 29, 2014 – The Giants announce opening day roster which includes relative newcomers IF Ehíré Adríanza, RHP Juan Gutiérrez, IF Brandon Hicks, LHP David Huff, and OF Juan Pérez. LHP Jeremy Affeldt and IF Marco Scutaro will begin the season on the disabled list.
- May 9, 2014 – Starting first baseman Brandon Belt is hit by a pitch from Dodgers pitcher Paul Maholm, breaking his thumb with an estimated recovery time of 6 weeks.
- June 21, 2014 – The Giants call up IF Joe Panik from Triple-A Fresno.
- June 25, 2014 – RHP Tim Lincecum pitches the 16th no-hitter in Giants history at AT&T Park against the San Diego Padres, the second of his career, and his second against the Padres. Lincecum made 113 pitches, striking out 6 and walking 1.
- July 6, 2014 – LHP Madison Bumgarner and OF Hunter Pence are named to the 85th MLB All-Star Game roster. For Bumgarner, this was his second All-Star roster appearance, and his second in two years and for Pence, his third All-Star roster
- July 13, 2014 – RHP Tim Hudson is named to the All-Star Game roster as a replacement, this was his fourth All-Star roster appearance.
- July 26, 2014 – The Giants traded two minor leaguers; LHP Edwin Escobar and RHP Heath Hembree to the Boston Red Sox in exchange for RHP Jake Peavy.
- August 19, 2014 – The Giants' game in Chicago against the Cubs was called on account of rain in the middle of the fifth inning, with the Cubs declared winners, 2–0. The Giants protested the game, as the Cubs' ground crew was delayed in covering the field during worsening rain. The protest was upheld, with the game ordered resumed from the point at which it had been stopped. The game was subsequently resumed on August 21 and played to completion; the Cubs won, 2–1.
- August 28, 2014 – RHP Yusmeiro Petit sets the Major League record for most consecutive batters retired at 46.
- September 24, 2014 – With a 9–1 loss to the Los Angeles Dodgers at Dodger Stadium, the Giants are mathematically eliminated from the NL West race, guaranteed to finish second in the division to the rival Dodgers.
- September 25, 2014 – With the Milwaukee Brewers loss to the Cincinnati Reds, the Giants clinch a spot in the NL Wild Card game.
- October 1, 2014 – The Giants defeat the Pittsburgh Pirates in the NL Wild Card game 8–0 to move on to the Division Series against the Washington Nationals.
- October 7, 2014 – The Giants defeat the Washington Nationals in Game 4 of the Division Series to win the series 3–1, and advance to the Championship Series to face the St. Louis Cardinals.
- October 16, 2014 – The Giants defeat the St. Louis Cardinals 6–3 in Game 5 of the Championship Series to win the National League pennant and move on to the World Series to face the Kansas City Royals. LHP Madison Bumgarner is named the series MVP.
- October 29, 2014 – The Giants defeat the Kansas City Royals 3–2 in Game 7 of the World Series to win their third title in five years. LHP Madison Bumgarner is named World Series MVP.

== Game log and schedule ==
All schedule and scores taken from MLB.com.

Legend
	Giants win
	Giants loss
	Postponement
**Bold**	Giants team member

2014 Game Log
March (1–0)

#	Date	Opponent	Score	Win	Loss	Save	Attendance	Record
1	March 31	@ Diamondbacks	9–8	**Machi** (1–0)	Reed (0–1)	**Romo** (1)	48,451	1–0

April (16–11)

#	Date	Opponent	Score	Win	Loss	Save	Attendance	Record
2	April 1	@ Diamondbacks	4–5	Miley (1–1)	**Gutiérrez** (0–1)	Reed (1)	18,974	1–1
3	April 2	@ Diamondbacks	2–0	**Hudson** (1–0)	Cahill (0–2)	**Romo** (2)	19,357	2–1
4	April 3	@ Diamondbacks	8–5	**Machi** (2–0)	Harris (0–1)		19,131	3–1
5	April 4	@ Dodgers	8–4	**Huff** (1–0)	Ryu (1–1)		53,493	4–1
6	April 5	@ Dodgers	7–2	**Bumgarner** (1–0)	Maholm (0–1)		49,520	5–1
7	April 6	@ Dodgers	2–6	Greinke (2–0)	**Cain** (0–1)		48,367	5–2
8	April 8	Diamondbacks	7–3	**Hudson** (2–0)	Cahill (0–3)		42,166	6–2
9	April 9	Diamondbacks	3–7	Arroyo (1–0)	**Lincecum** (0–1)	Collmenter (1)	41,157	6–3
10	April 10	Diamondbacks	5–6 (10)	Putz (1–0)	**Petit** (0–1)	Reed (3)	41,577	6–4
11	April 11	Rockies	6–5	**Bumgarner** (2–0)	de la Rosa (0–2)	**Romo** (3)	41,707	7–4
12	April 12	Rockies	0–1	Kahnle (2–0)	**Cain** (0–2)	Hawkins (2)	41,917	7–5
13	April 13	Rockies	5–4 (10)	**Romo** (1–0)	Brothers (1–1)		41,490	8–5
14	April 15	Dodgers	3–2 (12)	**Petit** (1–1)	League (0–1)		42,469	9–5
15	April 16	Dodgers	2–1	**Machi** (3–0)	Howell (1–1)	**Romo** (4)	42,773	10–5
16	April 17	Dodgers	1–2	Ryu (2–1)	**Bumgarner** (2–1)	Jansen (5)	42,890	10–6
17	April 18	@ Padres	1–2	Ross (2–2)	**Cain** (0–3)	Street (6)	34,839	10–7
18	April 19	@ Padres	1–3	Stults (1–2)	**Hudson** (2–1)	Benoit (1)	43,405	10–8
19	April 20	@ Padres	4–3	**Lincecum** (1–1)	Erlin (1–2)	**Romo** (5)	25,035	11–8
20	April 21	@ Rockies	2–8	de la Rosa (1–3)	**Vogelsong** (0–1)		25,434	11–9
21	April 22	@ Rockies	1–2	Morales (2–1)	**Bumgarner** (2–2)	Hawkins (6)	27,165	11–10
22	April 23	@ Rockies	12–10 (11)	**Machi** (4–0)	Bettis (0–1)		35,191	12–10
23	April 25	Indians	5–1	**Hudson** (3–1)	Carrasco (0–3)		41,296	13–10
24	April 26	Indians	5–3	**Gutiérrez** (1–1)	McAllister (3–1)	**Romo** (6)	42,088	14–10
25	April 27	Indians	4–1	**Romo** (2–0)	Allen (2–1)		41,530	15–10
26	April 28	Padres	4–6	Ross (3–3)	**Bumgarner** (2–3)	Street (10)	41,533	15–11
27	April 29	Padres	6–0	**Petit** (2–1)	Stults (1–3)		41,952	16–11
28	April 30	Padres	3–2	**Hudson** (4–1)	Erlin (1–4)	**Romo** (7)	42,164	17–11

May (19–9)

#	Date	Opponent	Score	Win	Loss	Save	Attendance	Record
29	May 2	@ Braves	2–1	**Lincecum** (2–1)	Minor (0–1)	**Romo** (8)	29,469	18–11
30	May 3	@ Braves	3–1	**Vogelsong** (1–1)	Teherán (2–2)	**Romo** (9)	34,648	19–11
31	May 4	@ Braves	4–1	**Bumgarner** (3–3)	Wood (2–5)	**Casilla** (1)	30,067	20–11
32	May 5	@ Pirates	11–10 (13)	**Machi** (5–0)	Hughes (1–1)	**Romo** (10)	13,675	21–11
33	May 6	@ Pirates	1–2	Watson (3–0)	**Hudson** (4–2)		18,881	21–12
34	May 7	@ Pirates	3–4	Cole (3–2)	**Lincecum** (2–2)	Melancon (2)	23,975	21–13
35	May 8	@ Dodgers	3–1 (10)	**Casilla** (1–0)	Howell (1–3)	**Romo** (11)	43,068	22–13
36	May 9	@ Dodgers	3–1	**Bumgarner** (4–3)	Maholm (1–3)	**Romo** (12)	49,171	23–13
37	May 10	@ Dodgers	2–6	Greinke (6–1)	**Affeldt** (0–1)		47,199	23–14
38	May 11	@ Dodgers	7–4 (10)	**Romo** (3–0)	Jansen (0–2)	**Machi** (1)	51,369	24–14
39	May 12	Braves	4–2	**Lincecum** (3–2)	Floyd (0–1)	**Romo** (13)	41,438	25–14
40	May 13	Braves	0–5	Minor (1–2)	**Vogelsong** (1–2)		41,506	25–15
41	May 14	Braves	10–4	**Bumgarner** (5–3)	Teherán (2–3)		41,253	26–15
42	May 15	Marlins	6–4	**Cain** (1–3)	Eovaldi (2–2)	**Romo** (14)	41,597	27–15
43	May 16	Marlins	5–7	Dunn (4–3)	**Casilla** (1–1)	Cishek (8)	41,819	27–16
44	May 17	Marlins	0–5	Koehler (4–3)	**Lincecum** (3–3)	Cishek (9)	41,619	27–17
45	May 18	Marlins	4–1	**Vogelsong** (2–2)	Turner (0–2)	**Romo** (15)	41,551	28–17
46	May 20	@ Rockies	4–5	Hawkins (2–0)	**Romo** (3–1)		31,046	28–18
47	May 21	@ Rockies	5–1	**Petit** (3–1)	Chacín (0–3)		30,411	29–18
–	May 22	@ Rockies	2–2 (6)	**Game Suspended (rain)**. Resume date: 9/1				
48	May 23	Twins	6–2	**Lincecum** (4–3)	Gibson (4–4)	**Machi** (2)	41,514	30–18
49	May 24	Twins	2–1	**Vogelsong** (3–2)	Deduno (1–3)	**Romo** (16)	41,724	31–18
50	May 25	Twins	8–1	**Bumgarner** (6–3)	Nolasco (2–5)		42,590	32–18
51	May 26	Cubs	4–8	Samardzija (1–4)	**Petit** (3–2)		42,257	32–19
52	May 27	Cubs	4–0	**Hudson** (5–2)	Arrieta (1–1)		41,060	33–19
53	May 28	Cubs	5–0	**Kontos** (1–0)	Jackson (3–5)		41,186	34–19
54	May 29	@ Cardinals	6–5	**López** (1–0)	Martínez (0–3)	**Romo** (17)	41,337	35–19
55	May 30	@ Cardinals	9–4	**Bumgarner** (7–3)	Wainwright (8–3)		43,107	36–19
56	May 31	@ Cardinals	0–2	Wacha (4–3)	**Petit** (3–3)	Rosenthal (16)	44,426	36–20

June (10–16)

#	Date	Opponent	Score	Win	Loss	Save	Attendance	Record
57	June 1	@ Cardinals	8–0	**Hudson** (6–2)	Lynn (6–3)		42,734	37–20
58	June 3	@ Reds	3–8	Bailey (6–3)	**Lincecum** (4–4)		27,152	37–21
59	June 4	@ Reds	3–2	**Vogelsong** (4–2)	Cingrani (2–6)	**Romo** (18)	26,333	38–21
60	June 5	@ Reds	6–1	**Bumgarner** (8–3)	Leake (3–5)		25,532	39–21
61	June 6	Mets	4–2	**Affeldt** (1–1)	Torres (2–3)	**Romo** (19)	41,437	40–21
62	June 7	Mets	5–4	**Affeldt** (2–1)	Mejía (4–3)		41,296	41–21
63	June 8	Mets	6–4	**Lincecum** (5–4)	Wheeler (2–6)	**Romo** (20)	41,911	42–21
64	June 9	Nationals	2–9	Strasburg (6–4)	**Vogelsong** (4–3)		41,597	42–22
65	June 10	Nationals	1–2	Fister (5–1)	**Bumgarner** (8–4)	Soriano (13)	41,545	42–23
66	June 11	Nationals	2–6	Roark (5–4)	**Cain** (1–4)		41,404	42–24
67	June 12	Nationals	7–1	**Hudson** (7–2)	Treinen (0–3)		41,067	43–24
68	June 13	Rockies	4–7	Belisle (1–2)	**Romo** (3–2)	Hawkins (12)	41,258	43–25
69	June 14	Rockies	4–5	Brothers (3–4)	**Romo** (3–3)	Hawkins (13)	41,704	43–26
70	June 15	Rockies	7–8	Belisle (2–2)	**Gutiérrez** (1–2)	Hawkins (14)	41,824	43–27
71	June 17	@ White Sox	2–8	Danks (6–5)	**Cain** (1–5)		25,278	43–28
72	June 18	@ White Sox	6–7	Sale (6–1)	**Hudson** (7–3)	Belisario (7)	20,059	43–29
73	June 20	@ Diamondbacks	1–4	Collmenter (5–4)	**Lincecum** (5–5)	Reed (17)	29,295	43–30
74	June 21	@ Diamondbacks	6–4	**Vogelsong** (5–3)	McCarthy (1–10)	**Romo** (21)	37,916	44–30
75	June 22	@ Diamondbacks	4–1	**Bumgarner** (9–4)	Bolsinger (1–3)	**Romo** (22)	27,862	45–30
76	June 23	Padres	0–6	Despaigne (1–0)	**Cain** (1–6)		41,360	45–31
77	June 24	Padres	2–7	Hahn (3–1)	**Hudson** (7–4)		41,546	45–32
78	June 25	Padres	4–0	**Lincecum** (6–5)	Kennedy (5–9)		41,500	46–32
79	June 26	Reds	1–3	Leake (6–6)	**Vogelsong** (5–4)	Chapman (15)	41,156	46–33
80	June 27	Reds	2–6	Cueto (8–5)	**Bumgarner** (9–5)	Chapman (16)	41,046	46–34
81	June 28	Reds	3–7	Broxton (4–0)	**López** (1–1)		41,024	46–35
82	June 29	Reds	0–4	Bailey (8–4)	**Hudson** (7–5)		41,541	46–36

July (12–14)

#	Date	Opponent	Score	Win	Loss	Save	Attendance	Record
83	July 1	Cardinals	5–0	**Lincecum** (7–5)	Gonzales (0–1)		41,152	47–36
84	July 2	Cardinals	0–2	Wainwright (11–4)	**Vogelsong** (5–5)	Rosenthal (25)	41,321	47–37
85	July 3	Cardinals	2–7	Martínez (2–3)	**Bumgarner** (9–6)		41,181	47–38
86	July 4	@ Padres	0–2	Stults (3–11)	**Cain** (1–7)	Street (23)	31,126	47–39
87	July 5	@ Padres	5–3	**Romo** (4–3)	Thayer (3–3)	**Casilla** (2)	36,127	48–39
88	July 6	@ Padres	5–3	**Lincecum** (8–5)	Hahn (4–2)	**Casilla** (3)	28,065	49–39
89	July 7	@ Athletics	0–5	Chavez (7–5)	**Vogelsong** (5–6)		36,067	49–40
90	July 8	@ Athletics	1–6	Gray (9–3)	**Bumgarner** (9–7)		36,067	49–41
91	July 9	Athletics	5–2	**Cain** (2–7)	Hammel (0–1)	**Casilla** (4)	41,427	50–41
92	July 10	Athletics	1–6	Kazmir (11–3)	**Hudson** (7–6)		41,069	50–42
93	July 11	Diamondbacks	5–0	**Lincecum** (9–5)	Bolsinger (1–6)		41,647	51–42
94	July 12	Diamondbacks	0–2	Miley (5–6)	**Vogelsong** (5–7)	Reed (21)	41,261	51–43
95	July 13	Diamondbacks	8–4	**Bumgarner** (10–7)	Nuño (0–1)		41,288	52–43
96	July 18	@ Marlins	9–1	**Bumgarner** (11–7)	Eovaldi (5–5)		23,017	53–43
97	July 19	@ Marlins	5–3	**Hudson** (8–6)	Álvarez (6–5)	**Casilla** (5)	24,882	54–43
98	July 20	@ Marlins	2–3	Hand (1–2)	**Lincecum** (9–6)	Cishek (21)	25,221	54–44
99	July 21	@ Phillies	7–4	**Kontos** (2–0)	Lee (4–5)	**Casilla** (6)	27,334	55–44
100	July 22	@ Phillies	9–6 (14)	**Kontos** (3–0)	Manship (1–2)	**Lincecum** (1)	30,109	56–44
101	July 23	@ Phillies	3–1	**Bumgarner** (12–7)	Papelbon (2–2)	**Casilla** (7)	28,648	57–44
102	July 24	@ Phillies	1–2	Hamels (5–5)	**Hudson** (8–7)	Papelbon (24)	33,258	57–45
103	July 25	Dodgers	1–8	Greinke (12–6)	**Lincecum** (9–7)		41,753	57–46
104	July 26	Dodgers	0–5	Kershaw (12–2)	**Vogelsong** (5–8)		42,060	57–47
105	July 27	Dodgers	3–4	Ryu (12–5)	**Peavy** (0–1)	Jansen (30)	41,459	57–48
106	July 28	Pirates	0–5	Worley (4–1)	**Bumgarner** (12–8)		41,794	57–49
107	July 29	Pirates	1–3	Liriano (3–7)	**Hudson** (8–8)	Melancon (20)	42,242	57–50
108	July 30	Pirates	7–5	**Machi** (6–0)	Wilson (3–2)	**Casilla** (8)	42,272	58–50

August (16–12)

#	Date	Opponent	Score	Win	Loss	Save	Attendance	Record
109	August 1	@ Mets	5–1	**Vogelsong** (6–8)	Niese (5–7)		28,905	59–50
110	August 2	@ Mets	2–4	deGrom (6–5)	**Peavy** (0–2)	Mejía (16)	33,687	59–51
111	August 3	@ Mets	9–0	**Bumgarner** (13–8)	Colón (10–9)		32,408	60–51
112	August 4	@ Mets	4–3	**Romo** (5–3)	Mejía (5–4)	**Casilla** (9)	27,187	61–51
113	August 5	@ Brewers	3–4	Nelson (2–2)	**Machi** (6–1)	Rodríguez (33)	40,465	61–52
114	August 6	@ Brewers	7–4	**Vogelsong** (7–8)	Gallardo (6–6)		33,394	62–52
115	August 7	@ Brewers	1–3	Peralta (14–6)	**Peavy** (0–3)	Rodríguez (34)	38,229	62–53
116	August 8	@ Royals	2–4	Frasor (3–1)	**Bumgarner** (13–9)	Holland (33)	28,307	62–54
117	August 9	@ Royals	0–5	Shields (11–6)	**Hudson** (8–9)		35,114	62–55
118	August 10	@ Royals	4–7	Duffy (7–10)	**Lincecum** (9–8)	Holland (34)	27,359	62–56
119	August 12	White Sox	2–3 (10)	Putnam (4–2)	**Casilla** (1–2)		42,317	62–57
120	August 13	White Sox	7–1	**Peavy** (1–3)	Quintana (6–9)		41,725	63–57
121	August 15	Phillies	3–5 (10)	Giles (2–0)	**Casilla** (1–3)	Papelbon (28)	41,425	63–58
122	August 16	Phillies	6–5	**Affeldt** (3–1)	Bastardo (5–7)	**Romo** (23)	41,907	64–58
123	August 17	Phillies	5–2	**Lincecum** (10–8)	Buchanan (6–7)	**Casilla** (10)	41,851	65–58
–	August 19	@ Cubs	0–2 (5)	Game Suspended (Unplayable conditions). Resume date: 8/21				
124	August 20	@ Cubs	8–3	**Peavy** (2–3)	Jackson (6–14)		30,633	66–58
125	August 21	@ Cubs	1–2	Wada (3–1)	**Vogelsong** (7–9)	Rondón (19)	31,064	66–59
126	August 21	@ Cubs	5–3	**Bumgarner** (14–9)	Wood (7–11)	**Casilla** (11)	30,541	67–59
127	August 22	@ Nationals	10–3	**Hudson** (9–9)	Fister (12–4)		33,718	68–59
128	August 23	@ Nationals	2–6	Zimmermann (9–5)	**Lincecum** (10–9)		34,137	68–60
129	August 24	@ Nationals	6–14	Stammen (4–4)	**Affeldt** (3–2)		35,476	68–61
130	August 25	Rockies	2–3	Matzek (3–9)	**Peavy** (2–4)	Hawkins (21)	41,052	68–62
131	August 26	Rockies	3–0	**Bumgarner** (15–9)	de la Rosa (13–9)		41,050	69–62
132	August 27	Rockies	4–2	**Casilla** (2–3)	Nicasio (5–6)		41,071	70–62
133	August 28	Rockies	4–1	**Petit** (4–3)	Lyles (6–2)	**Casilla** (12)	41,017	71–62
134	August 29	Brewers	13–2	**Vogelsong** (8–9)	Peralta (15–9)		41,348	72–62
135	August 30	Brewers	3–1	**Peavy** (3–4)	Fiers (4–2)	**Casilla** (13)	41,397	73–62
136	August 31	Brewers	15–5	**Bumgarner** (16–9)	Lohse (12–8)		41,935	74–62

September (14–12)

#	Date	Opponent	Score	Win	Loss	Save	Attendance	Record
137	September 1	@ Rockies	4–2	**Affeldt** (4–2)	Friedrich (0–4)	**Casilla** (14)	36,468	75–62
138	September 1	@ Rockies	9–10	Hawkins (3–2)	**Romo** (5–4)		33,711	75–63
139	September 2	@ Rockies	12–7	**Kontos** (4–0)	Belisle (4–7)		25,256	76–63
140	September 3	@ Rockies	2–9	Bergman (2–2)	**Vogelsong** (8–10)		23,122	76–64
141	September 5	@ Tigers	8–2	**Peavy** (4–4)	Porcello (15–10)		31,940	77–64
142	September 6	@ Tigers	5–4	**Bumgarner** (17–9)	Price (13–11)	**Casilla** (15)	35,722	78–64
143	September 7	@ Tigers	1–6	Lobstein (1–0)	**Hudson** (9–10)		27,523	78–65
144	September 9	Diamondbacks	5–1	**Petit** (5–3)	Miley (7–11)		41,683	79–65
145	September 10	Diamondbacks	5–0	**Machi** (7–1)	Pérez (3–4)		41,293	80–65
146	September 11	Diamondbacks	6–2	**Peavy** (5–4)	Delgado (3–4)		41,039	81–65
147	September 12	Dodgers	9–0	**Bumgarner** (18–9)	Ryu (14–7)		41,147	82–65
148	September 13	Dodgers	0–17	Greinke (15–8)	**Hudson** (9–11)		41,533	82–66
149	September 14	Dodgers	2–4	Kershaw (19–3)	**Petit** (5–4)	Jansen (42)	41,932	82–67
150	September 15	@ Diamondbacks	2–6	Miley (8–11)	**Vogelsong** (8–11)		21,731	82–68
151	September 16	@ Diamondbacks	2–1	**Peavy** (6–4)	Collmenter (10–8)	**Casilla** (16)	26,339	83–68
152	September 17	@ Diamondbacks	4–2	**Romo** (6–4)	Reed (1–6)	**Casilla** (17)	19,272	84–68
153	September 19	@ Padres	0–5	Despaigne (4–7)	**Hudson** (9–12)		34,472	84–69
154	September 20	@ Padres	2–3	Cashner (5–7)	**Petit** (5–5)	Quackenbush (5)	40,660	84–70
155	September 21	@ Padres	2–8	Kennedy (12–13)	**Vogelsong** (8–12)		32,480	84–71
156	September 22	@ Dodgers	5–2 (13)	**Casilla** (3–3)	Correia (2–4)	**Strickland** (1)	53,500	85–71
157	September 23	@ Dodgers	2–4	Greinke (16–8)	**Bumgarner** (18–10)	Jansen (44)	49,251	85–72
158	September 24	@ Dodgers	1–9	Kershaw (21–3)	**Hudson** (9–13)		53,387	85–73
159	September 25	Padres	9–8	**Lincecum** (11–9)	Boyer (0–1)	**Casilla** (18)	41,850	86–73
160	September 26	Padres	1–4	Kennedy (13–13)	**Vogelsong** (8–13)	Benoit (11)	41,926	86–74
161	September 27	Padres	3–1	**Strickland** (1–0)	Thayer (4–5)	**Casilla** (19)	41,157	87–74
162	September 28	Padres	9–3	**Lincecum** (12–9)	Erlin (4–5)		41,077	88–74

=== Postseason ===
2014 Postseason Game Log (12–5)
National League Wild Card Game (1–0)

Game	Date	Opponent	Score	Win	Loss	Save	Attendance	Series
1	October 1	@ Pirates	8–0	**Bumgarner** (1–0)	Vólquez (0–1)		40,629	1–0

National League Division Series (3–1)

Game	Date	Opponent	Score	Win	Loss	Save	Attendance	Series
1	October 3	@ Nationals	3–2	**Peavy** (1–0)	Strasburg (0–1)	**Casilla** (1)	44,035	1–0
2	October 4	@ Nationals	2–1 (18)	**Petit** (1–0)	Roark (0–1)	**Strickland** (1)	44,035	2–0
3	October 6	Nationals	1–4	Fister (1–0)	**Bumgarner** (0–1)		43,627	2–1
4	October 7	Nationals	3–2	**Strickland** (1–0)	Thornton (0–1)	**Casilla** (2)	43,464	3–1

National League Championship Series (4–1)

Game	Date	Opponent	Score	Win	Loss	Save	Attendance	Series
1	October 11	@ Cardinals	3–0	**Bumgarner** (1–0)	Wainwright (0–1)	**Casilla** (1)	47,201	1–0
2	October 12	@ Cardinals	4–5	Maness (1–0)	**Romo** (0–1)		46,262	1–1
3	October 14	Cardinals	5–4 (10)	**Romo** (1–1)	Choate (0–1)		42,716	2–1
4	October 15	Cardinals	6–4	**Petit** (1–0)	Gonzales (0–1)	**Casilla** (2)	43,147	3–1
5	October 16	Cardinals	6–3	**Affeldt** (1–0)	Wacha (0–1)		43,217	4–1

World Series (4–3)

Game	Date	Opponent	Score	Win	Loss	Save	Attendance	Series
1	October 21	@ Royals	7–1	**Bumgarner** (1–0)	Shields (0–1)		40,459	1–0
2	October 22	@ Royals	2–7	Herrera (1–0)	**Peavy** (0–1)		40,446	1–1
3	October 24	Royals	2–3	Guthrie (1–0)	**Hudson** (0–1)	Holland (1)	43,020	1–2
4	October 25	Royals	11–4	**Petit** (1–0)	Finnegan (0–1)		43,066	2–2
5	October 26	Royals	5–0	**Bumgarner** (2–0)	Shields (0–2)		43,087	3–2
6	October 28	@ Royals	0–10	Ventura (1–0)	**Peavy** (0–2)		40,372	3–3
7	October 29	@ Royals	3–2	**Affeldt** (1–0)	Guthrie (1–1)	**Bumgarner** (1)	40,535	4–3

== Roster ==
2014 San Francisco Giants
Roster
Pitchers: 41 Jeremy Affeldt; 43 Brett Bochy; 40 Madison Bumgarner; 18 Matt Cain; 46 Santiago Casilla; 51 Erik Cordier; 51 Jake Dunning; 57 J. C. Gutierrez; 53 Chris Heston; 17 Tim Hudson; 34 David Huff; 59 Mike Kickham; 70 George Kontos; 55 Tim Lincecum; 49 Javier López; 63 Jean Machi; 43,22 Jake Peavy; 52 Yusmeiro Petit; 54 Sergio Romo; 60 Hunter Strickland; 32 Ryan Vogelsong	Catchers: 28 Buster Posey; 14 Guillermo Quiróz; 34 Andrew Susac; 29 Héctor Sánchez; Infielders: 10,21 Tony Abreu; 53,6 Ehire Adrianza; 13 Joaquín Árias; 9 Brandon Belt; 35 Brandon Crawford; 50 Matt Duffy; 37 Adam Duvall; 14 Brandon Hicks; 45 Travis Ishikawa; 12 Joe Panik; 48 Pablo Sandoval; 19 Marco Scutaro; 22 Dan Uggla	Outfielders: 7 Gregor Blanco; 56 Gary Brown; 10,21 Tyler Colvin; 10 Chris Dominguez; 38 Michael Morse; 16 Ángel Pagán; 8 Hunter Pence; 2 Juan Pérez	Manager: 15 Bruce Bochy; Coaches: -- Joey Amalfitano (special assistant); -- Jim Davenport (special assistant); 1 Tim Flannery (third base); 26 Mark Gardner (bullpen); 58 Bill Hayes (bullpen catcher); 39 Roberto Kelly (first base); 5 Joe Lefebvre (assistant hitting); 31 Hensley Meulens (hitting); 33 Dave Righetti (pitching); -- J. T. Snow (special assistant); 23 Ron Wotus (bench)

== Postseason ==
=== Wild Card ===
The Giants tabbed 18-game winner Madison Bumgarner to start the Wild Card elimination game, while the Pittsburgh Pirates starter was Edinson Vólquez. A scoreless tie was broken in the fourth inning in style, when Brandon Crawford launched a grand slam home run to right field. Crawford became the first shortstop to hit a grand slam in Major League Baseball postseason history. Brandon Belt hit singles in back-to-back at-bats in the 6th and 7th innings, driving in three more runs, while Buster Posey singled in the 8th inning to drive in the final run. Bumgarner was masterful, as he went the distance, shutting out the Pirates on just four hits, making 109 pitches, striking out 10 and walking only 1. The win marked the Giants 7th-straight victory in postseason elimination games, tying the MLB record. The Giants moved on to face the number-one seeded Washington Nationals in the National League Division Series.

Wednesday, October 1, 2014 – 8:07 p.m. (EDT) at PNC Park in Pittsburgh

Team	1	2	3	4	5	6	7	8	9	R	H	E
San Francisco Giants	0	0	0	4	0	1	2	1	0	8	11	2
Pittsburgh Pirates	0	0	0	0	0	0	0	0	0	0	4	0
WP: Madison Bumgarner (1–0) LP: Edinson Vólquez (0–1); Home runs: SF: Brandon Crawford (1); PIT: None

=== Division Series ===
==== Game 1, October 3 ====
The Giants opened the series with Jake Peavy on the mound to counter Nationals starter Stephen Strasburg. Joe Panik put the Giants on the board in the 3rd inning with an RBI single and Brandon Belt followed suit in the 4th to support Peavy, who did not allow a hit until the bottom of the 5th inning. The first signs of trouble for the Giants came in the bottom of the 6th when, after a leadoff double from former Giant Nate Schierholtz and a two-out walk to Jayson Werth, Peavy was taken out of the game. Javier López came into the game only to surrender a walk to Adam LaRoche. With the bases loaded, Hunter Strickland came on to make just his tenth overall Major League appearance and struck out Ian Desmond to end the threat. The Giants added a 3rd run when Panik tripled to lead off the 7th, and Buster Posey singled to knock him in. This run was to prove crucial, as when Strickland came out in the bottom half of the inning, he allowed home runs to both Bryce Harper and Asdrúbal Cabrera to make it a one-run game. Jeremy Affeldt finished off the Nationals in the 7th and Sergio Romo pitched a scoreless 8th, before Santiago Casilla retired the side in order for the save, as the Giants held on to win by a score of 3–2.

3:07 p.m. (EDT) at Nationals Park in Washington, D.C.

Team	1	2	3	4	5	6	7	8	9	R	H	E
San Francisco Giants	0	0	1	1	0	0	1	0	0	3	12	0
Washington Nationals	0	0	0	0	0	0	2	0	0	2	6	0
WP: Jake Peavy (1–0) LP: Stephen Strasburg (0–1) Sv: Santiago Casilla (1); Home runs: SF: None; WSH: Bryce Harper (1), Asdrúbal Cabrera (1); Attendance: 44,035

==== Game 2, October 4 ====
Game Two of the Division Series between the Washington Nationals and the Giants at Nationals Park on October 4 lasted 18 innings before the Giants won 2–1. It was the longest postseason game in Major League Baseball history by time, lasting 6 hours 23 minutes, and tied the postseason record for number of innings played. Tim Hudson struck out 8 Nationals and conceded one run in 7 1/3 innings of work, but was bettered by Nationals starter Jordan Zimmermann who came an out shy of recording a three-hit shutout, before walking Joe Panik and being removed from the game. The Giants continued to rally in the ninth when Buster Posey singled on the first pitch from closer Drew Storen, and Pablo Sandoval drove in Panik with a double. Posey was thrown out at home plate on the same play, and manager Bruce Bochy called for the first video review in MLB postseason history. The review was unsuccessful and the game went to extra innings. As neither team could break the deadlock, Yusmeiro Petit became just the 7th pitcher to throw 6 or more shutout innings of relief in a playoff game. Brandon Belt finally broke the tie, launching a home run into the second deck in right field to lead off the 18th inning. With the tying run on first, Hunter Strickland got slugger Jayson Werth to fly out to the warning track to earn the save, and a 2–0 series advantage for the Giants. The win marked the 10th consecutive postseason victory for the Giants, a streak extending back to the 2012 National League Championship Series.

5:37 p.m. (EDT) at Nationals Park in Washington, D.C.

Team	1	2	3	4	5	6	7	8	9	10	11	12	13	14	15	16	17	18	R	H	E
San Francisco Giants	0	0	0	0	0	0	0	0	1	0	0	0	0	0	0	0	0	1	2	8	0
Washington Nationals	0	0	1	0	0	0	0	0	0	0	0	0	0	0	0	0	0	0	1	9	0
WP: Yusmeiro Petit (1–0) LP: Tanner Roark (0–1) Sv: Hunter Strickland (1); Home runs: SF: Brandon Belt (1); WSH: None; Attendance: 44,035

==== Game 3, October 6 ====
Game 3 saw the Giants winner from the Wild Card game Madison Bumgarner square off against Nationals starter Doug Fister, in a repeat of the pitching match-up from Game 2 of the World Series in 2012. Just as in that game, the first 6 innings of the game were scoreless, as Bumgarner and Fister were both dominant. The tie was broken in the top of the 7th inning when, after Ian Desmond's leadoff single and Bryce Harper's walk, Bumgarner threw the ball past third baseman Pablo Sandoval, trying to nail the lead runner on a Wilson Ramos sacrifice bunt, allowing both Desmond and Harper to score. Asdrúbal Cabrera padded the Nationals lead with a single to knock in Ramos and that gave the Nationals a 3–0 lead. Harper launched his second home run of the series in the 9th inning off Jean Machi to put the game further out of reach. The Giants led off the bottom of the ninth with Sandoval, who singled and when Hunter Pence doubled to follow him, the Giants had faint hopes of a comeback. However, Drew Storen recovered to allow the Giants just the one run on Brandon Crawford's sacrifice fly, as the Giants avoided being shut out, but lost game three by a final score of 4–1.

5:07 p.m. (EDT) at AT&T Park in San Francisco, California

Team	1	2	3	4	5	6	7	8	9	R	H	E
Washington Nationals	0	0	0	0	0	0	3	0	1	4	7	0
San Francisco Giants	0	0	0	0	0	0	0	0	1	1	6	1
WP: Doug Fister (1–0) LP: Madison Bumgarner (0–1); Home runs: WSH: Bryce Harper (2); SF: None; Attendance: 43,627

==== Game 4, October 7 ====
In what was to prove the decisive game of the series, Ryan Vogelsong started for the Giants against Nationals starter Gio González. Vogelsong had struggled down the stretch, while Gonzalez had been dominant through September. The Giants were able to strike early in the 2nd inning thanks to some bizarre circumstances. After Brandon Crawford hit a one-out single, Juan Pérez hit a ground ball back to Gonzalez, who bobbled the ball and diverted it into the gap between first and second base, allowing Pérez to reach. Then Vogelsong's attempted sacrifice bunt turned out to be the perfect bunt, with neither Gonzalez nor third baseman Anthony Rendon taking charge to field the ball, and all the runners were safe. With the bases loaded, Gregor Blanco was walked on four pitches by Gonzalez to force in a run. Joe Panik then hit a soft ground ball to first base, and the Nationals were forced to take the out there, allowing Pérez to score and giving the Giants a 2–0 lead. Vogelsong did not allow a hit until the 5th inning when Ian Desmond singled to lead off the inning, however he was soon under pressure as Bryce Harper doubled down the left-field line to knock in Desmond and the tying run was in scoring position with no outs. Vogelsong pitched out of the inning without allowing the runner to score. The Giants loaded the bases in the bottom half of the inning with one out, but could not score as both teams squandered golden opportunities to seize the initiative. Hunter Pence made a spectacular catch up against the archways in right field to retire Jayson Werth and that was the end of the night for Vogelsong, who allowed one run on two hits in 5 2/3 innings. Bryce Harper came up again in the top of the 7th, and just as in Game 1 of the series, homered deep to right off Hunter Strickland for his third home run of the series to tie the game. The Giants did not wait long to answer back, as they again loaded the bases with one out, and Aaron Barrett made a wild pitch to give the Giants a lead again. On an attempt to walk Pablo Sandoval intentionally, Barrett threw the ball past catcher Wilson Ramos, but Buster Posey was thrown out trying to score from third base. Again, just as in Game 1 a collision play at the plate with Posey as the runner was reviewed, and again the out call was upheld. The Giants relief pair of Sergio Romo in the 8th and Santiago Casilla in the 9th combined to shut the Nationals down, and send the Giants into the NLCS, beating the Nationals by 3 games to 1.

9:07 p.m. (EDT) at AT&T Park in San Francisco, California

Team	1	2	3	4	5	6	7	8	9	R	H	E
Washington Nationals	0	0	0	0	1	0	1	0	0	2	4	1
San Francisco Giants	0	2	0	0	0	0	1	0	x	3	8	0
WP: Hunter Strickland (1–0) LP: Matt Thornton (0–1) Sv: Santiago Casilla (2); Home runs: WSH: Bryce Harper (3); SF: None; Attendance: 43,464

=== Championship Series ===
==== Game 1 ====
The Giants set up Madison Bumgarner to start Game 1 against Cardinals ace Adam Wainwright. After being retired in order in the 1st inning, the Giants loaded the bases in the 2nd with nobody out. Brandon Crawford struck out, then Travis Ishikawa blooped a single down the left-field line to give the Giants a 1–0 lead. With two outs, Gregor Blanco hit a hard ground ball to third-baseman Matt Carpenter that proved too hot to handle, and allowed a second run to score for the Giants. Brandon Belt added a third on a sacrifice fly in the 3rd inning, and that was to prove to be the final run of the contest. After Wainwright was forced to leave the game in the fifth inning due to his pitch count, the Cardinal bullpen shut the Giants lineup down the rest of the way. However, Bumgarner displayed the same form he had in the Wild Card game, pitching 7 2/3 shutout innings giving up just 4 hits (all singles), walking only 1 and striking out 7. Bumgarner set a postseason record for scoreless innings on the road, his streak standing at 26 2/3. Sergio Romo came in to finish the 8th inning, and Santiago Casilla closed out the game retiring the Cardinals in order in the 9th as the Giants won 3–0.

Saturday, October 11, 2014 – 8:07 p.m. (EDT) at Busch Stadium in St. Louis, Missouri

Team	1	2	3	4	5	6	7	8	9	R	H	E
San Francisco Giants	0	2	1	0	0	0	0	0	0	3	8	0
St. Louis Cardinals	0	0	0	0	0	0	0	0	0	0	4	1
WP: Madison Bumgarner (1–0) LP: Adam Wainwright (0–1) Sv: Santiago Casilla (1); Attendance: 47,201

==== Game 2 ====
The Giants sent Peavy to the mound, while the Cardinals started Lance Lynn. The game was a back and forth encounter, and Matt Carpenter opened the scoring in the bottom of the 3rd inning with the first of four solo home runs the Cardinals were to hit. St. Louis doubled its advantage in the 4th, when Randal Grichuk singled with the bases loaded. Peavy escaped the jam conceding just the one run, but was taken out of the game after just 4 innings, as his spot in the lineup came up with runners at second and third with one out in the 5th. Pinch-hitter Joaquín Árias grounded out to score a run and cut the deficit. Lynn struck out the next three batters but with two outs in the 6th inning, Pablo Sandoval doubled down the left-field line and Hunter Pence lined a single to knock him in and tie the game. The Cardinals turned to their bullpen, and the Giants promptly loaded the bases in the 7th, with Gregor Blanco's RBI single giving the Giants their first lead of the game. This was to prove short-lived however, as Oscar Taveras hit a solo shot off Jean Machi to tie the game in the bottom half of the inning. The Cardinals then took the lead in the 8th thanks to another solo dinger, this time from Matt Adams, as Hunter Strickland surrendered his fourth home-run of the postseason. After Pat Neshek held the Giants in check in the 8th, Trevor Rosenthal was called upon to get the final three outs. He retired the lead-off hitter, but Andrew Susac's pinch-hit single was followed by a Juan Pérez base hit. With the Cardinals one out away and the Giants down to their last strike with Joe Panik at the plate, Rosenthal spiked a 3–2 pitch in the dirt that went to the backstop, and pinch-runner Matt Duffy was able to score all the way from second base to tie the game once again. The Giants could not take the lead however, and this was to prove decisive as Sergio Romo gave up a walk-off homer to Kolten Wong to lead off the bottom of the 9th, and the Cardinals levelled the series at 1.

Sunday, October 12, 2014 – 8:07 p.m. (EDT) at Busch Stadium in St. Louis, Missouri

Team	1	2	3	4	5	6	7	8	9	R	H	E
San Francisco Giants	0	0	0	0	1	1	1	0	1	4	10	0
St. Louis Cardinals	0	0	1	1	0	0	1	1	1	5	8	0
WP: Seth Maness (1–0) LP: Sergio Romo (0–1); Home runs: SF: None; STL: Matt Carpenter (1), Oscar Taveras (1), Matt Adams (1), Kolten Wong (1); Attendance: 46,262

==== Game 3 ====
The Giants starter for Game 3 was Tim Hudson who, at the age of 39 was making his first Championship Series start. John Lackey went against him, coming off a victory over the Los Angeles Dodgers in the Cardinals NLDS. Hudson sent the Cardinals down in order in the top of the 1st, and Lackey retired the first two Giant hitters in the bottom half. The Giants then staged a big two-out rally which, after an RBI double by Hunter Pence, was capped off by Travis Ishikawa's bases clearing double to give the Giants a 4–0 lead. The wind was blowing fiercely and carried the ball several feet away from where Cardinals right-fielder Randal Grichuk expected to play the ball. The Cardinals began their efforts to come back in the top of the 4th inning. After singles by Jon Jay and Matt Holliday to start the inning, Hudson appeared to be working through the trouble as he retired the next two hitters, however Kolten Wong hurt the Giants at the plate again, this time launching a two-run triple to cut the Giants lead to 2 runs. Pence had the same problems with the wind in right-field as Grichuk had earlier, again being nowhere near the point where the ball eventually hit off the bricks. With Lackey settling into a rhythm for the Cardinals, they continued to chip away at the Giants lead in the 6th. Jhonny Peralta hit a two-out RBI single that created a one-run game. Hudson came back out in the 7th inning, and with one out gave up a towering game-tying home-run to Grichuk that hit high off the foul pole in left-field. With both starters out of the game the bullpens settled into their work, and sent the game to extra innings. In the bottom of the 10th inning, with Randy Choate pitching for the Cardinals, Brandon Crawford drew a walk to lead off the inning. Juan Pérez was asked to perform a sacrifice bunt, and after fouling off two bunt attempts, Pérez ended up swinging the bat and lining a base-hit into left. Gregor Blanco was in turn asked to bunt the runners over. At the second attempt he got the bunt down, and Choate promptly threw the ball past first-base allowing Crawford to score the winning run on the throwing error.

Tuesday, October 14, 2014 – 4:07 p.m. (EDT) at AT&T Park in San Francisco, California

Team	1	2	3	4	5	6	7	8	9	10	R	H	E
St. Louis Cardinals	0	0	0	2	0	1	1	0	0	0	4	9	1
San Francisco Giants	4	0	0	0	0	0	0	0	0	1	5	6	0
WP: Sergio Romo (1–1) LP: Randy Choate (0–1); Home runs: STL: Randal Grichuk (1); SF: None; Attendance: 42,716

==== Game 4 ====
In Game 4, the starting pitchers were Ryan Vogelsong for the Giants, and Shelby Miller for the Cardinals. A bout of early scoring was started by leadoff man Matt Carpenter, who doubled on a ball that was slowed down by a deflection from second-baseman Joe Panik, and scored on a single by Matt Adams. The Giants answered immediately though in the bottom of the 1st, as Gregor Blanco also had a leadoff double go off a fielders' glove, this time a fly-ball that was dropped by Jon Jay on the run. Blanco scored on Buster Posey's sacrifice fly to even the game. With an eerie similarity to Game 3, a fielding mistake by the Cardinals was copied later by the Giants, as Kolten Wong doubled off the glove of Blanco to make it three straight leadoff doubles. A. J. Pierzynski, in the lineup for the injured Yadier Molina, knocked in Wong as the Cardinals took the lead back. The Cardinals added on in the top of the 3rd when, with runners at the corners and no outs, Jhonny Peralta grounded into a double-play to score a run. Wong then launched his second home-run of the series to make it 4–1. That home-run meant the Cardinals had hit six in the series, while the Giants had not hit any. In the bottom of the third, the Giants cancelled out the two scored by the Cardinals in the top half of the inning, with two-out RBI singles by Posey and Hunter Pence. Vogelsong was taken out of the game, and the bullpen was again superb for the Giants as the Cardinals could not add to the four runs they had at that point. The Cardinals went to their bullpen as well with two outs in the 4th inning. After putting runners in scoring position in both the 4th and 5th innings and failing to cash in, the Giants rally came in the 6th with the help of some more odd plays. With Marco Gonzales pitching for St. Louis, Juan Pérez led off with a walk and Brandon Crawford followed with a single. Matt Duffy laid down a sacrifice bunt to put runners at second and third with one out. With the infield playing in, Blanco hit a ground ball to Adams at first-base and with Pérez running on contact his off-balance throw was too late at the plate and all the runners were safe. The go-ahead run scored when Panik hit a hard ground-ball to Adams who stepped on first-base for an out and then delivered a loopy throw to Peralta at second for an attempted double-play that pulled him off the base, and gave Crawford enough time to come home from third. Posey added an insurance run on a single off new pitcher Seth Maness. The Giants late inning relief shut down the Cardinals, with Santiago Casilla finishing the game with the save.

Wednesday, October 15, 2014 – 8:07 p.m. (EDT) at AT&T Park in San Francisco, California

Team	1	2	3	4	5	6	7	8	9	R	H	E
St. Louis Cardinals	1	1	2	0	0	0	0	0	0	4	11	0
San Francisco Giants	1	0	2	0	0	3	0	0	x	6	11	0
WP: Yusmeiro Petit (1–0) LP: Marco Gonzales (0–1) Sv: Santiago Casilla (2); Home runs: STL: Kolten Wong (2); SF: None; Attendance: 43,147

==== Game 5 ====
In a rematch of Game 1, Madison Bumgarner and Adam Wainwright were the starting pitchers. Just as in Game 4, the lead changed hands quickly early in the game. The Cardinals struck first in the top of the 3rd inning, when Travis Ishikawa misplayed a fly-ball off the bat of Jon Jay that went over his head to score a run for the Cardinals. Bumgarner escaped the inning without any further damage. With two outs in the bottom half of the inning, Gregor Blanco singled for the second time in as many at-bats, and then Joe Panik hit a two-run home run inside the foul-pole in right-field. This was Panik's first home-run at AT&T Park and just his second since being called up. However, the Cardinals then grabbed the lead right back, as Bumgarner surrendered solo shots to both Matt Adams and Tony Cruz to give the Cardinals a 3–2 lead. Both starting pitchers then found their rhythm, and no more runs were scored until the bottom half of the 8th, as both pitchers combined to retire 22 consecutive batters. Wainwright was taken out of the game in favour of set-up man Pat Neshek. The Giants too made a change as Bumgarner's night was to be over after 8 quality innings. Michael Morse stepped in to pinch-hit, and hit a game-tying home run into the corner in left field. This was the 5th pinch-hit home run in Giants playoff history. Neshek retired the next three hitters to send the game to the 9th inning. Santiago Casilla the Giants closer was asked to pitch the ninth, and he ended up loading the bases with two outs. Oscar Taveras was announced as the pinch-hitter, so Jeremy Affeldt was called in. Affeldt coaxed a chopper back to the mound that he took to first base himself to leave the sacks full, and send the game to the bottom of the 9th. The Cardinals brought in 2013 NLCS MVP Michael Wacha, who was making his first appearance since September 26. Pablo Sandoval led off with a single, and with one out Brandon Belt drew a four pitch walk. Up stepped Ishikawa, who had been lifted for a defensive replacement before the 9th inning in every other game in the series. After working the count to 2–0, Ishikawa launched a walk-off three-run home run over the high wall in right. Ishikawa became the first player in NLCS history to hit a walk-off home run to send his team to the World Series.

Thursday, October 16, 2014 – 8:07 p.m. (EDT) at AT&T Park in San Francisco, California

Team	1	2	3	4	5	6	7	8	9	R	H	E
St. Louis Cardinals	0	0	1	2	0	0	0	0	0	3	6	0
San Francisco Giants	0	0	2	0	0	0	0	1	3	6	7	0
WP: Jeremy Affeldt (1–0) LP: Michael Wacha (0–1); Home runs: STL: Matt Adams (2), Tony Cruz (1); SF: Joe Panik (1), Michael Morse (1), Travis Ishikawa (1); Attendance: 43,217

=== World Series ===
==== Game 1 ====
Thanks to the days off between the NLCS and the World Series, the Giants were able to start their ace Madison Bumgarner in back-to-back games, James Shields was on the mound for the Royals. The Giants wasted no time in pouncing on Shields in the 1st inning. Gregor Blanco led off with a single and Buster Posey had another to put runners at the corners with one out. Pablo Sandoval then doubled down the right field line to knock in Blanco. Posey was thrown out at home plate trying to score for the third time in the postseason as the Giants challenged the arm of Norichika Aoki. That brought Hunter Pence to the plate and he delivered a big home run to right-center field to give the Giants a 3-run inning. The Giants added on in the 4th when Pence doubled to lead off the inning and Brandon Belt walked to bring up DH Michael Morse, who singled up the middle to knock in Pence and knock out Shields. Danny Duffy was brought into the game and after a sacrifice bunt, walked the next two batters, with Blanco picking up an RBI on his base on balls to give the Giants a 5–0 lead. Joe Panik tripled in a run past a diving Aoki in the 7th, and Sandoval drove in another through the drawn-in infield to account for the 6th and 7th runs for the Giants. Salvador Pérez homered off Bumgarner in the bottom of the 7th, but that was the only run he allowed. Again magnificent, he gave up just 3 hits and walked 1 batter in 7 innings. Bumgarner himself extended his postseason scoreless streak on the road to a new MLB record 32 2/3 innings, and took over the Giants record for postseason wins with 6. With their 7–1 victory, the Giants had now won 16 of their last 18 in the postseason, and handed Kansas City their first loss of the 2014 postseason.

Tuesday, October 21, 2014 – 8:07 p.m. (EDT) at Kauffman Stadium in Kansas City, Missouri

Team	1	2	3	4	5	6	7	8	9	R	H	E
San Francisco Giants	3	0	0	2	0	0	2	0	0	7	10	1
Kansas City Royals	0	0	0	0	0	0	1	0	0	1	4	1
WP: Madison Bumgarner (1–0) LP: James Shields (0–1); Home runs: SF: Hunter Pence (1); KC: Salvador Pérez (1); Attendance: 40,459

==== Game 2 ====
Jake Peavy was tabbed by the Giants to start Game 2, while Yordano Ventura took the mound for the Royals. The game started with a bang, as Gregor Blanco led off the game with a solo home run. The Royals hit back immediately however, with a single from Billy Butler tying the score in the bottom of the 1st. In the 2nd, the Royals took the lead on a double from Alcides Escobar. The Giants came back to tie the game at 2 thanks to an RBI double off the bat of Brandon Belt in the 4th inning. The Giants knocked Ventura out of the game in the 6th, but their attempted rally was shut down by Kelvin Herrera. The Giants were also forced to remove Peavy in the 6th after the first two men reached base in the inning. However, where the Royals bullpen had shut down the Giants, the San Francisco bullpen proceeded to melt down. Jean Machi lost the lead and was replaced by Javier López who retired the only batter he was allowed to face. Hunter Strickland was brought in, and surrendered a 2-run double to Salvador Pérez and then a two-run home run to Omar Infante. The benches briefly cleared after Strickland took exception to events after the home run was hit. The Royals bullpen shut the Giants down the rest of the way, and Kansas City had all the offense they needed to win 7–2 and tie the World Series at 1–1.

Wednesday, October 22, 2014 – 8:07 p.m. (EDT) at Kauffman Stadium in Kansas City, Missouri

Team	1	2	3	4	5	6	7	8	9	R	H	E
San Francisco Giants	1	0	0	1	0	0	0	0	0	2	9	0
Kansas City Royals	1	1	0	0	0	5	0	0	X	7	10	0
WP: Kelvin Herrera (1–0) LP: Jake Peavy (0–1); Home runs: SF: Gregor Blanco (1); KC: Omar Infante (1); Attendance: 40,446

==== Game 3 ====
Tim Hudson was the starter for the Giants, and Jeremy Guthrie for the Royals. At the ages of 39 and 35 respectively, both were making their first World Series starts. The Royals took the lead with a run in the top of the 1st inning, Alcides Escobar leading off with a double and scoring on Lorenzo Cain's RBI groundout. This was a lead they would not relinquish, as Guthrie shut the Giants down until the 6th inning. Hudson also settled down, but gave up another run on a double by Alex Gordon in the 6th and was removed from the game. Eric Hosmer added the third run for the Royals with an RBI single off reliever Javier López. The Giants did answer back in the bottom half of the inning, with Michael Morse delivering another pinch-hit RBI on a double, and after Guthrie was lifted, Buster Posey's RBI groundout. The Giants had closed the gap to a one-run game but could not make any further impression on the Royals bullpen, as Greg Holland picked up the save to give Kansas City a 3–2 victory, and the lead in the series 2–1.

Friday, October 24, 2014 – 8:07 p.m. (EDT) at AT&T Park in San Francisco

Team	1	2	3	4	5	6	7	8	9	R	H	E
Kansas City Royals	1	0	0	0	0	2	0	0	0	3	6	0
San Francisco Giants	0	0	0	0	0	2	0	0	0	2	4	0
WP: Jeremy Guthrie (1–0) LP: Tim Hudson (0–1) Sv: Greg Holland (1); Home runs: KC: None; SF: None; Attendance: 43,020

==== Game 4 ====
In an unpredictable Game 4, Ryan Vogelsong and Jason Vargas were the starting pitchers. The early signs were good for the Giants, as Gregor Blanco led off with a walk, advanced on a wild pitch and stole third base, coming in to score on Hunter Pence's groundout. Having retired Kansas City in the 1st and 2nd innings relatively easily, Vogelsong hit a roadblock in the 3rd. He gave up 5 singles, a walk and a stolen base as the Royals scored 4 runs to knock him out of the game after recording just 8 outs. Buster Posey reduced the gap to 2 runs in the bottom of the 3rd with a two-out RBI single. Yusmeiro Petit was called on to pitch, and he delivered another 3 scoreless innings of relief to hold the Royals at 4. Petit also had a single despite an .049 career batting average that put a runner in scoring position in the 4th, but the Giants could not cash in. Joe Panik led off the 5th inning with a double and Royals manager Ned Yost took Vargas out of the game. This was to prove a costly decision, as Jason Frasor gave up an RBI single to Pence that made it a one-run game. Danny Duffy was brought in, but he too struggled allowing a single to Pablo Sandoval that moved Pence to 3rd base, and a walk to Brandon Belt to load the bases. Juan Pérez hit a sacrifice-fly to tie the game at 4. In the 6th, Brandon Finnegan was the next Royals reliever to be touched up as Sandoval came through again, this time with a bases-loaded two-run single. Belt added another run on a single to give the Giants a 7–4 lead. Finnegan allowed the first two runners to reach in the 7th, and he was removed from the game in favor of Tim Collins. Blanco then attempted to bunt the runners over, and Collins threw the ball into him as he was running down the line, allowing a run to score, the trail runner to 3rd base and Blanco to reach. Panik then drove in two more with his second double of the game as the Giants hit double digits in runs scored. Pence also doubled to make the score 11–4 Giants. Sergio Romo and Hunter Strickland delivered scoreless innings to give the Giants the win that tied the series at 2.

Saturday, October 25, 2014 – 8:07 p.m. (EDT) at AT&T Park in San Francisco

Team	1	2	3	4	5	6	7	8	9	R	H	E
Kansas City Royals	0	0	4	0	0	0	0	0	0	4	12	1
San Francisco Giants	1	0	1	0	2	3	4	0	X	11	16	0
WP: Yusmeiro Petit (1–0) LP: Brandon Finnegan (0–1); Attendance: 43,066

==== Game 5 ====
In a rematch of Game 1, Madison Bumgarner and James Shields opposed each other on the mound. The Giants opened the scoring in the 2nd off Shields, in an inning that began with a single from Hunter Pence and a bunted base hit against the shift for Brandon Belt. After a deep fly-ball moved both runners up, Brandon Crawford grounded out to second base and with the infield playing back, Pence scored and the Giants had a 1–0 lead. This was added to in the bottom of the 4th, with Crawford again providing the RBI on a base-hit to center fielder Jarrod Dyson. Although not ruled an error, Dyson bobbled the ball with the runner holding at third base and had the ball been played cleanly the run would not have scored on the play. The Giants offense was held in check by the Royals pitching until an outburst in the 8th inning provided the cushion they were looking for. Pablo Sandoval and Pence hit back-to-back singles to start the inning, and with one out Juan Pérez launched a double that missed clearing the center field wall for a home run by inches, but knocked in two runs. Pérez was allowed to reach third base on an errant throw, and Crawford drove him in for his third RBI of the night to make the score 5–0 Giants. However, the night was really about Bumgarner. Just as in the Wild Card game, he threw a complete-game shutout, allowing just 4 hits, not walking a batter and striking out 8 and making 117 pitches. Bumgarner became just the second pitcher to allow 1 run or fewer in each of his first four career World Series starts. The win meant the Giants held a 3–2 lead in the series, heading back to Kansas City.

Sunday, October 26, 2014 – 8:07 p.m. (EDT) at AT&T Park in San Francisco

Team	1	2	3	4	5	6	7	8	9	R	H	E
Kansas City Royals	0	0	0	0	0	0	0	0	0	0	4	1
San Francisco Giants	0	1	0	1	0	0	0	3	X	5	12	0
WP: Madison Bumgarner (2–0) LP: James Shields (0–2); Attendance: 43,087

==== Game 6 ====
Giants starter Jake Peavy was in trouble early on, escaping a jam in the 1st inning. He was not able to do so in the 2nd. Peavy allowed four singles and a double to Mike Moustakas and was removed from the game with the score at 2–0. The Giants called upon Yusmeiro Petit to get them out of the inning, however Petit only compounded the Giants difficulties. Lorenzo Cain's single scored two more runs and Eric Hosmer's double did the same, before Billy Butler drove in the 7th and final run of the inning. The game was as good as over almost as soon as it began. The Giants had one chance at an unlikely comeback, loading the bases in the 3rd inning but Buster Posey grounded into an inning-ending double play to end the Giants threat. The Royals continued to tack on to their already unassailable lead, Cain doubling in a run in the 3rd, Alcides Escobar repeating the dose in the 5th, and Moustakas adding another on a home run in the 7th. Whilst the Giants drew 5 walks against Kansas City starter Yordano Ventura they could not put any runs on the scoreboard against him as he pitched 7 scoreless innings. The Royals completed a shutout and a crushing 10–0 victory to send the World Series to a deciding Game 7.

Tuesday, October 28, 2014 – 8:07 p.m. (EDT) at Kauffman Stadium in Kansas City, Missouri

Team	1	2	3	4	5	6	7	8	9	R	H	E
San Francisco Giants	0	0	0	0	0	0	0	0	0	0	6	0
Kansas City Royals	0	7	1	0	1	0	1	0	X	10	15	0
WP: Yordano Ventura (1–0) LP: Jake Peavy (0–2); Home runs: SF: None; KC: Mike Moustakas (1); Attendance: 40,372

==== Game 7 ====
In the deciding game of the World Series, Tim Hudson took the mound for the Giants, and in doing so set a new record for the oldest pitcher to start a World Series game. Jeremy Guthrie was the starter for the Royals. After being sent down in order in the 1st inning, the Giants offense awoke in the 2nd. Pablo Sandoval started the inning being hit by a pitch, Hunter Pence and Brandon Belt followed with base hits to load the sacks with nobody out. Michael Morse and Brandon Crawford produced consecutive sacrifice flies to give the Giants a 2–0 lead. The advantage was to be short-lived, as Hudson gave up a single to Billy Butler and an RBI double to Alex Gordon. Salvador Pérez was drilled by a pitch that forced him to hobble down to first base. Mike Moustakas hit a fly-ball to left-field, and Gordon tagged up to go to third base, allowing Omar Infante to tie the game with a sacrifice fly. Alcides Escobar singled, and that was that for Hudson as the Giants were forced to remove a starter before the end of the 2nd inning for two straight games. Jeremy Affeldt came into the game and got the Giants out of the inning. In the bottom of the 3rd inning, the Giants turned a potentially game-changing double play after the leadoff man reached. Joe Panik dived to snare a ball hit off the bat of Eric Hosmer, flipped the ball with his glove to Crawford, who turned the ball over to first base where, after a replay review called for by the Giants, Hosmer was ruled out having elected to slide head-first. In the top of the 4th, Sandoval and Pence again reached to start the inning, and Morse knocked in the go-ahead run off Kelvin Herrera. From that point on, the game became all about the pitchers. Affeldt pitched the fourth, keyed by another Panik-Crawford-Belt double play, before the Giants called upon Madison Bumgarner to hold the lead. The Royals missed two chances with a runner in scoring position in the 5th. Bumgarner retired 12 hitters in a row to send the game into the 9th inning with the Giants holding a one-run lead. Instead of electing to use his closer, manager Bruce Bochy allowed Bumgarner to go out and pitch the 9th. Hosmer struck out and Butler popped up and the Giants were an out away. Gordon hit a sinking liner that was misplayed by Gregor Blanco in center field, and then bobbled by Juan Pérez and Gordon reached third base. With Salvador Pérez batting, Bumgarner induced a foul pop-up that was caught by Sandoval and the Giants won the World Series title. Bumgarner's personal performance earned him the World Series MVP. Incredibly, only three days after making 117 pitches in shutting out the Royals in Game 5, Bumgarner pitched 5 innings of scoreless relief making 68 pitches and not walking a batter. He broke the record set by Curt Schilling for the most innings pitched in a single postseason.

Wednesday, October 29, 2014 – 8:07 p.m. (EDT) at Kauffman Stadium in Kansas City, Missouri

Team	1	2	3	4	5	6	7	8	9	R	H	E
San Francisco Giants	0	2	0	1	0	0	0	0	0	3	8	1
Kansas City Royals	0	2	0	0	0	0	0	0	0	2	6	0
WP: Jeremy Affeldt (1–0) LP: Jeremy Guthrie (1–1) Sv: Madison Bumgarner (1); Attendance: 40,535

== Batting ==
Please note, only the statistics from games played with the Giants are included in this list. Stats in bold are team leaders. Individual pitchers are not included in the list.

Note: G = Games played; AB = At bats; R = Runs scored; H = Hits; 2B = Doubles; 3B = Triples; HR = Home runs; RBI = Runs batted in; AVG = Batting average; OBP = On-base percentage; SLG = Slugging percentage; OPS = On-base + Slugging percentage SB = Stolen bases

Player	G	AB	R	H	2B	3B	HR	RBI	AVG	OBP	SLG	OPS	SB
Hunter Pence	**162**	**650**	**106**	**180**	29	**10**	20	74	.277	.332	.445	.777	13
Pablo Sandoval	157	588	68	164	26	3	16	73	.279	.324	.415	.739	0
Buster Posey	147	547	72	170	28	2	**22**	**89**	**.311**	**.364**	**.490**	**.854**	0
Brandon Crawford	153	491	54	121	20	**10**	10	69	.246	.324	.389	.713	5
Michael Morse	131	438	48	122	**32**	3	16	61	.279	.336	.475	.811	0
Gregor Blanco	146	393	51	102	18	6	5	38	.260	.333	.374	.707	**16**
Ángel Pagán	96	383	56	115	21	2	3	27	.300	.342	.389	.731	**16**
Joe Panik	73	269	31	82	10	2	1	18	.305	.343	.368	.711	0
Brandon Belt	61	214	30	52	8	0	12	27	.243	.306	.449	.755	3
Brandon Hicks	71	204	27	33	6	1	8	22	.162	.280	.319	.599	0
Joaquín Árias	107	193	18	49	9	0	0	15	.254	.281	.301	.581	1
Héctor Sánchez	66	163	8	32	8	0	3	28	.196	.237	.301	.538	0
Tyler Colvin	57	139	16	31	10	3	2	18	.223	.268	.381	.650	1
Juan Pérez	61	100	13	17	7	0	1	3	.170	.224	.270	.494	0
Ehíré Adríanza	53	97	10	23	6	0	0	5	.237	.279	.299	.578	1
Andrew Susac	35	88	13	24	8	0	3	19	.273	.326	.466	.792	0
Travis Ishikawa	47	73	7	20	3	0	2	15	.274	.333	.397	.731	0
Adam Duvall	28	73	8	14	2	0	3	5	.192	.234	.342	.576	0
Matt Duffy	34	60	5	16	2	0	0	8	.267	.302	.300	.602	0
Chris Dominguez	8	17	1	1	0	0	1	2	.059	.111	.235	.346	0
Marco Scutaro	5	11	1	1	0	0	0	0	.091	.167	.091	.258	0
Dan Uggla	4	11	1	0	0	0	0	0	.000	.083	.000	.083	0
Gary Brown	7	7	1	3	0	0	0	1	.429	.429	.429	.857	0
Tony Abreu	3	4	0	0	0	0	0	0	.000	.000	.000	.000	0
Guillermo Quiróz	2	3	0	0	0	0	0	0	.000	.000	.000	.000	0
Pitcher totals	162	307	20	35	4	0	4	19	.114	.160	.166	.326	0
**Team totals**	**162**	**5523**	**665**	**1407**	**257**	**42**	**132**	**636**	**.255**	**.311**	**.388**	**.699**	**56**

== Pitching ==
Please note, only the statistics from games played with the Giants are included in this list. Stats in bold are team leaders.

Note: W = Wins; L = Losses; ERA = Earned run average; G = Games pitched; GS = Games started; SV = Saves; IP = Innings pitched; H = Hits allowed; ER = Earned runs allowed; HR = Home runs allowed; BB = Walks allowed; K = Strikeouts

Player	W	L	ERA	G	GS	SV	IP	H	ER	HR	BB	K
Madison Bumgarner	**18**	10	**2.98**	33	**33**	0	**217.1**	194	72	**21**	43	**219**
Tim Hudson	9	**13**	3.57	31	31	0	189.1	**199**	75	15	34	120
Ryan Vogelsong	8	**13**	4.00	32	32	0	184.2	178	**82**	18	58	151
Tim Lincecum	12	9	4.74	33	26	1	155.2	154	**82**	19	**63**	134
Yusmeiro Petit	5	5	3.69	39	12	0	117.0	97	48	12	22	133
Matt Cain	2	7	4.18	15	15	0	90.1	81	42	13	32	70
Jake Peavy	6	4	2.17	12	12	0	78.2	65	19	3	17	58
Jean Machi	7	1	2.58	**71**	0	2	66.1	45	19	5	18	51
J. C. Gutiérrez	1	2	3.96	61	0	0	63.2	60	28	7	16	44
Santiago Casilla	3	3	1.70	54	0	19	58.1	35	11	3	15	45
Sergio Romo	6	4	3.72	64	0	**23**	58.0	43	24	9	12	59
Jeremy Affeldt	4	2	2.28	62	0	0	55.1	47	14	1	14	41
Javier López	1	1	3.11	65	0	0	37.2	31	13	2	19	22
George Kontos	4	0	2.78	24	0	0	32.1	24	10	1	11	27
David Huff	1	0	6.30	16	0	0	20.0	27	14	2	6	11
Hunter Strickland	1	0	0.00	9	0	1	7.0	5	0	0	0	9
Erik Cordier	0	0	1.50	7	0	0	6.0	5	1	0	2	9
Chris Heston	0	0	5.06	3	1	0	5.1	6	3	0	3	4
Brett Bochy	0	0	5.40	3	0	0	3.1	1	2	1	2	3
Michael Kickham	0	0	22.50	2	0	0	2.0	8	5	1	1	1
Jake Dunning	0	0	0.00	1	0	0	0.2	0	0	0	1	0
**Team totals**	**88**	**74**	**3.50**	**162**	**162**	**46**	**1449.0**	**1305**	**564**	**133**	**389**	**1211**

== Farm system ==
Level	Team	League	Manager
AAA	Fresno Grizzlies	Pacific Coast League	Bob Mariano
AA	Richmond Flying Squirrels	Eastern League	Russ Morman
A	San Jose Giants	California League	Lenn Sakata
A	Augusta GreenJackets	South Atlantic League	Mike Goff
A-Short Season	Salem-Keizer Volcanoes	Northwest League	Gary Davenport
Rookie	AZL Giants	Arizona League	Nestor Rojas
