= Andrew Susac =

American baseball player (born 1990)

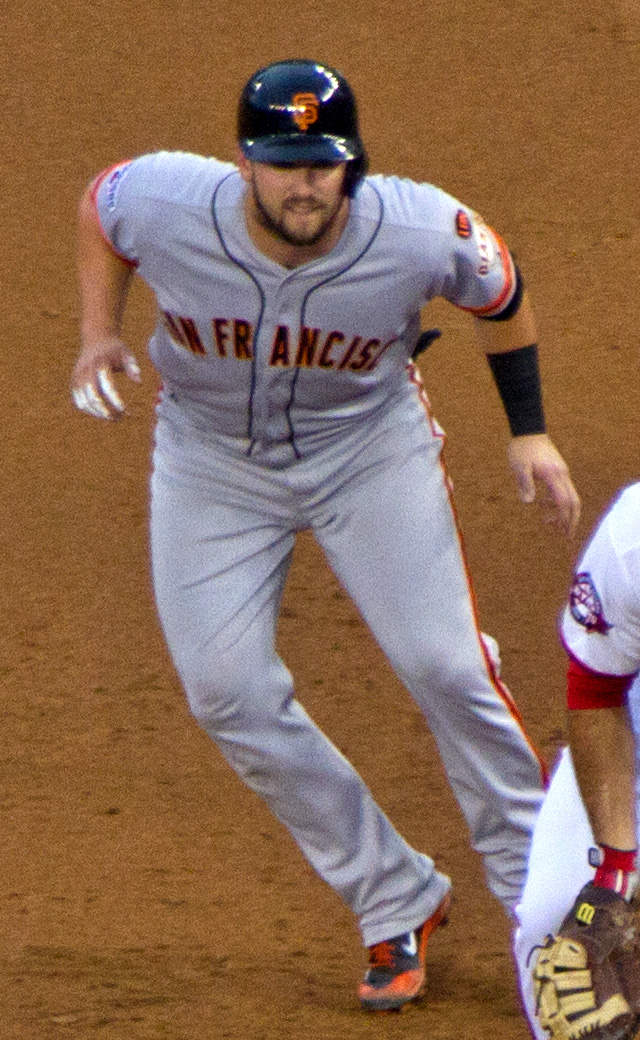
- Susac with the San Francisco Giants
- Catcher
- Born: March 22, 1990 (age 36); Roseville, California, U.S.
- Batted: Right Threw: Right

MLB debut
- July 26, 2014, for the San Francisco Giants

Last MLB appearance
- September 27, 2020, for the Pittsburgh Pirates

MLB statistics
- Batting average: .219
- Home runs: 7
- Runs batted in: 35
- Stats at Baseball Reference

Teams
- San Francisco Giants (2014–2015); Milwaukee Brewers (2016–2017); Baltimore Orioles (2018); Pittsburgh Pirates (2020)

Career highlights and awards
- World Series champion (2014)

Andrew John Susac (born March 22, 1990) is an American former professional baseball catcher. He played in Major League Baseball (MLB) for the San Francisco Giants, Milwaukee Brewers, Baltimore Orioles, and Pittsburgh Pirates. Susac played college baseball at Oregon State University.

== Career ==
=== Amateur career ===
Susac attended Jesuit High School in Carmichael, California, where he played for the school's baseball team as a catcher. He signed a letter of intent with Oregon State University to play college baseball for the Oregon State Beavers baseball team, but was also coveted by Major League Baseball (MLB) organizations. Baseball America rated Susac as the 40th-best available player in the upcoming 2009 MLB draft. After Susac graduated from Jesuit, the Philadelphia Phillies selected Susac in the 16th round of the draft. Susac opted not to sign, instead enrolling at Oregon State. In 2010, he played collegiate summer baseball with the Falmouth Commodores of the Cape Cod Baseball League and was named a league all-star.

=== San Francisco Giants ===
The San Francisco Giants selected Susac in the second round of the 2011 MLB draft. Susac signed with the Giants, receiving a $1.1 million signing bonus. The Giants assigned Susac to the San Jose Giants of the Class A-Advanced California League in 2012 and the Richmond Flying Squirrels of the Class AA Eastern League in 2013. He hit .256 in Richmond with 12 home runs and 46 RBIs, earning an Eastern League All-Star selection, and was invited to the Arizona Fall League, where he adjusted his swing and improved to hit .360 with two home runs and 11 walks in 17 games. Susac was listed as MLB.com's #3 prospect in the Giants organization for 2014. Susac began the 2014 season with the Fresno Grizzlies of the Class AAA Pacific Coast League (PCL), where he batted .268 in 63 games through July 26.

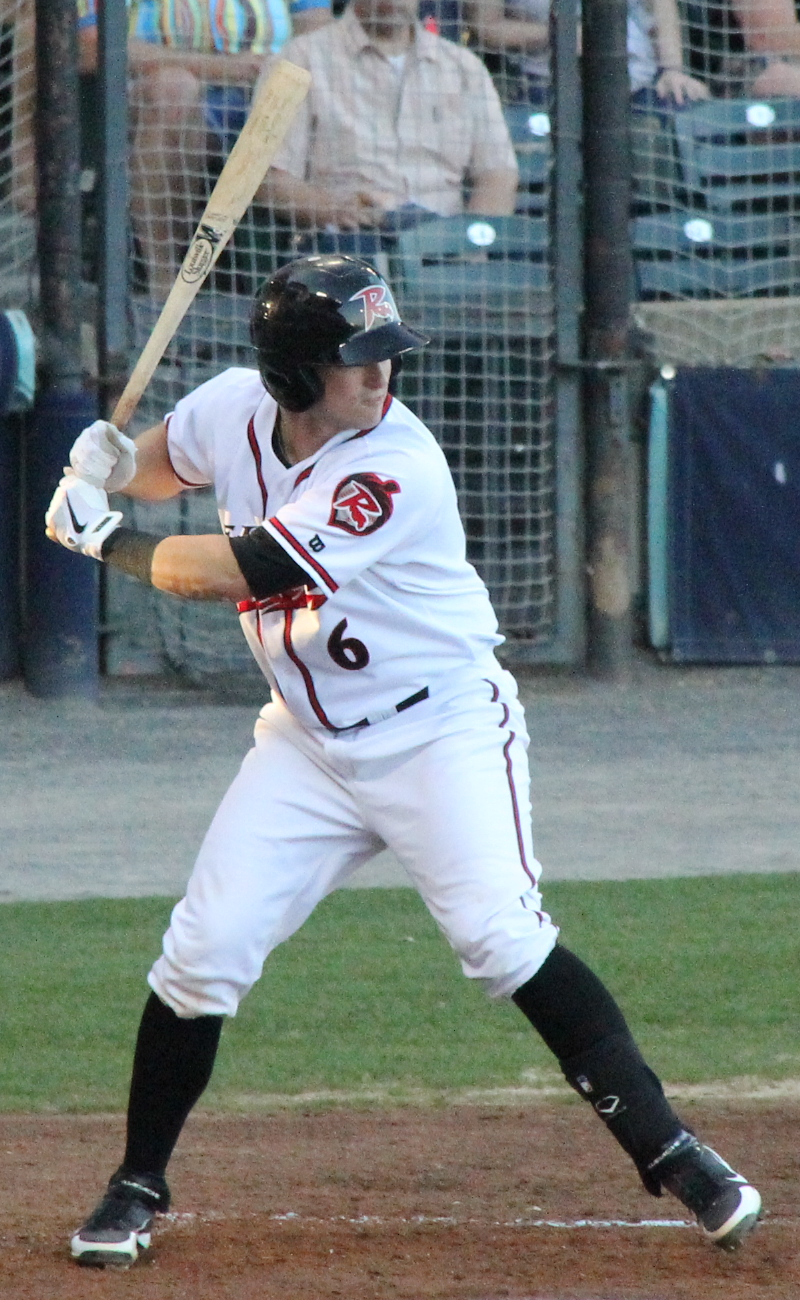
Susac batting for the Richmond Flying Squirrels in 2013

The Giants promoted Susac to the major leagues on July 25, 2014, to replace backup catcher Héctor Sánchez after Sánchez showed concussion symptoms. Susac flew to San Francisco the next morning and played his first MLB game that evening vs. the Los Angeles Dodgers, grounding out to third base in a single at-bat against Clayton Kershaw who shut out the Giants that day. Susac got his first major league hit, a single, on July 30, 2014, and his first major-league home run (a two-run homer) at Wrigley Field against Chicago Cubs pitcher Edwin Jackson on August 20, 2014.

However, Susac later played in the September 1 continuation of the Giants vs. Colorado Rockies game from May 22 (over three months earlier), which was suspended by rain, and due to MLB's record-keeping rules, May 22 is the date given for his official MLB debut. Susac also singled to left field and was later driven home by a double from Hunter Pence. Because the game was a continuation, May 22 is also the official date for Susac's first hit and first run scored, and with a swinging strikeout later in the same game his batting average was briefly .500. Susac finished the regular season with three home runs and 19 RBIs, batting .273 in 35 games played.

Susac was the Giants' backup catcher behind Buster Posey during the 2014 postseason. He appeared in four games, batting 1-for-4 (.250) as the Giants won the 2014 World Series.

In 2015, Susac was the only Giants prospect in Baseball America's top 100 list. However, he was set back in Spring Training with a tooth infection and wrist injury and subsequently started the season with the Sacramento River Cats of the PCL. Susac was called up to the Giants on April 18 when Jake Peavy went on the disabled list. On June 27, Susac hit a bases-loaded double that drove in three runs and helped the Giants come from behind to defeat the Colorado Rockies 7–5. In late June, Susac was named the Giants' regular catcher as the team dealt with outfield injuries that pushed Buster Posey to first base and Brandon Belt to left field.

On July 18, Susac sprained his right thumb while sliding into third base and was placed on the 15-day disabled list. Susac was activated on August 17, but was shut down for the season on September 5 due to lingering effects from the wrist sprain suffered in Spring Training. He underwent surgery on his wrist to remove bone fragments and address inflammation. In 2015, Susac appeared in 52 games, batting .218/.297/.368 with 3 home runs and 14 RBIs.

During spring training, Susac was set back by his sore right wrist and was optioned to Triple-A Sacramento to start the season.

=== Milwaukee Brewers ===
On August 1, 2016, Susac was traded along with the Giants top minor league prospect and 2015 First Round draft pick pitcher Phil Bickford to the Milwaukee Brewers for relief pitcher Will Smith.

=== Baltimore Orioles ===
On February 2, 2018, Susac was traded to the Baltimore Orioles for a player to be named later. He played in nine games for Baltimore during the year, going 3–for–26 (.115) with no home runs or RBI. Susac was designated for assignment on January 11, 2019, after the Orioles claimed Hanser Alberto off waivers from the New York Yankees. He cleared waivers and was outrighted to the Triple–A Norfolk Tides on January 18.

=== Kansas City Royals ===
On April 2, 2019, Susac was traded to the Kansas City Royals in exchange for cash considerations. In 26 games for the Triple–A Omaha Storm Chasers, he batted .234/.366/.442 with 4 home runs, 15 RBI, and 3 stolen bases. Susac became a free agent following the season on November 4.

=== Pittsburgh Pirates ===
On January 31, 2020, Susac signed a minor league contract with the Pittsburgh Pirates. He was not immediately assigned to an affiliate as a result of the minor league season being cancelled as a result of the COVID-19 pandemic. On September 27, Susac was selected to the 40-man and active rosters. He appeared in one game against the Cleveland Indians, going 0–for–2 with two walks. Susac was outrighted off of the 40-man roster three days later on September 30.

Susac re-signed with Pittsburgh on a new minor league contract on November 2, 2020. He spent the 2021 season with the Triple–A Indianapolis Indians, playing in only 11 games and hitting .222/.300/.444 with two home runs and three RBI. Susac elected free agency following the year on November 7, 2021.

== Personal life ==
Susac's younger brother, Daniel, played baseball at the University of Arizona and was drafted by the Oakland Athletics in the 2022 MLB draft; he currently plays for the San Francisco Giants.
