= 2014 National League Wild Card Game =

Play-in game during postseason

	1	2	3	4	5	6	7	8	9	R	H	E
San Francisco Giants	0	0	0	4	0	1	2	1	0	8	11	2
Pittsburgh Pirates	0	0	0	0	0	0	0	0	0	0	4	0
- Date: October 1, 2014
- Venue: PNC Park
- City: Pittsburgh, Pennsylvania
- Managers: Bruce Bochy (San Francisco Giants); Clint Hurdle (Pittsburgh Pirates)
- Umpires: Joe West (crew chief), Doug Eddings, Paul Emmel, Andy Fletcher, Brian Gorman, Mark Wegner, Phil Cuzzi (replay), Tim Timmons (replay)
- Attendance: 40,629
- Ceremonial first pitch: Kent Tekulve
- Television: ESPN
- TV announcers: Dan Shulman, John Kruk, Buster Olney, and Tim Kurkjian
- Radio: ESPN
- Radio announcers: Dave O'Brien and Aaron Boone

The 2014 National League Wild Card Game was a play-in game during Major League Baseball's (MLB) 2014 postseason played between the National League's (NL) two wild card teams, the San Francisco Giants and the Pittsburgh Pirates. It was held at PNC Park in Pittsburgh, Pennsylvania, on October 1, 2014, starting at 8:07 p.m. EDT. After both teams finished the regular season with identical records of 88–74, the Pirates were awarded home field for the game, as they won the season series against the Giants, 4–2. Despite this advantage, the Giants won by a score of 8–0 and advanced to play the Washington Nationals in the NL Division Series. In addition to being the third NL Wild Card Game played, it is notable for the first postseason grand slam hit by a shortstop. The game was televised on ESPN, and was also broadcast on ESPN Radio.

== Background ==
In Major League Baseball, the two teams with the best record in each league who do not win a division play against each other in the Wild Card Game. This was the second postseason meeting between the Giants and Pirates – the two teams first met in the 1971 NL Championship Series, with the Pirates coming from behind to win three games to one after dropping Game 1. The Giants' most recent postseason appearance was in 2012, when they swept the Detroit Tigers to win the World Series that year. On the other hand, the Pirates were able to advance to the playoffs in the previous season, marking the team's first postseason appearance in 21 years. They lost three games to two in that year's NLDS to the St. Louis Cardinals.

The first half of the 2014 season ended with both teams having three players on the NL squad for the 2014 Major League Baseball All-Star Game. Madison Bumgarner, Tim Hudson, and Hunter Pence represented the Giants, while Josh Harrison, Andrew McCutchen, and Tony Watson represented the Pirates. During the second half of the season, there were several teams that were in contention for the two Wild Card spots, along with their divisional competition. These included the Atlanta Braves, Cincinnati Reds, and Miami Marlins, in addition to San Francisco and Pittsburgh. The Pirates performed poorly in August, and they lost seven consecutive games at one point. However, the team made a resurgence by winning 17 of the last 23 games of the regular season, surpassing San Francisco in the process for first place in the wild card standings. The Pirates secured their spot in the postseason on September 23, while the Giants made it to the playoffs two days later. Both were the result of separate Brewers' losses to Cincinnati.

With Pittsburgh's postseason place secured, manager Clint Hurdle chose to start Gerrit Cole – the team's ace – in the final game of the season against the Cincinnati Reds on September 28, instead of skipping his turn in the rotation and saving his start for the Wild Card Game. This was done in an effort to beat the Cardinals to the NL Central division title, rather than settling for the wild card spot. The Pirates also needed to rely on the Arizona Diamondbacks – which finished with the worst record in the MLB at 64–98 (.395) – to defeat St. Louis in order to force a tiebreaker. However, this did not come to fruition as the Cardinals narrowly won 1–0 over the D-backs, while the Pirates lost 4–1 to Cincinnati. As a result of Cole starting in Sunday's season finale, he was unable to pitch in the Wild Card Game on Wednesday.

== Game results ==
=== Line score ===
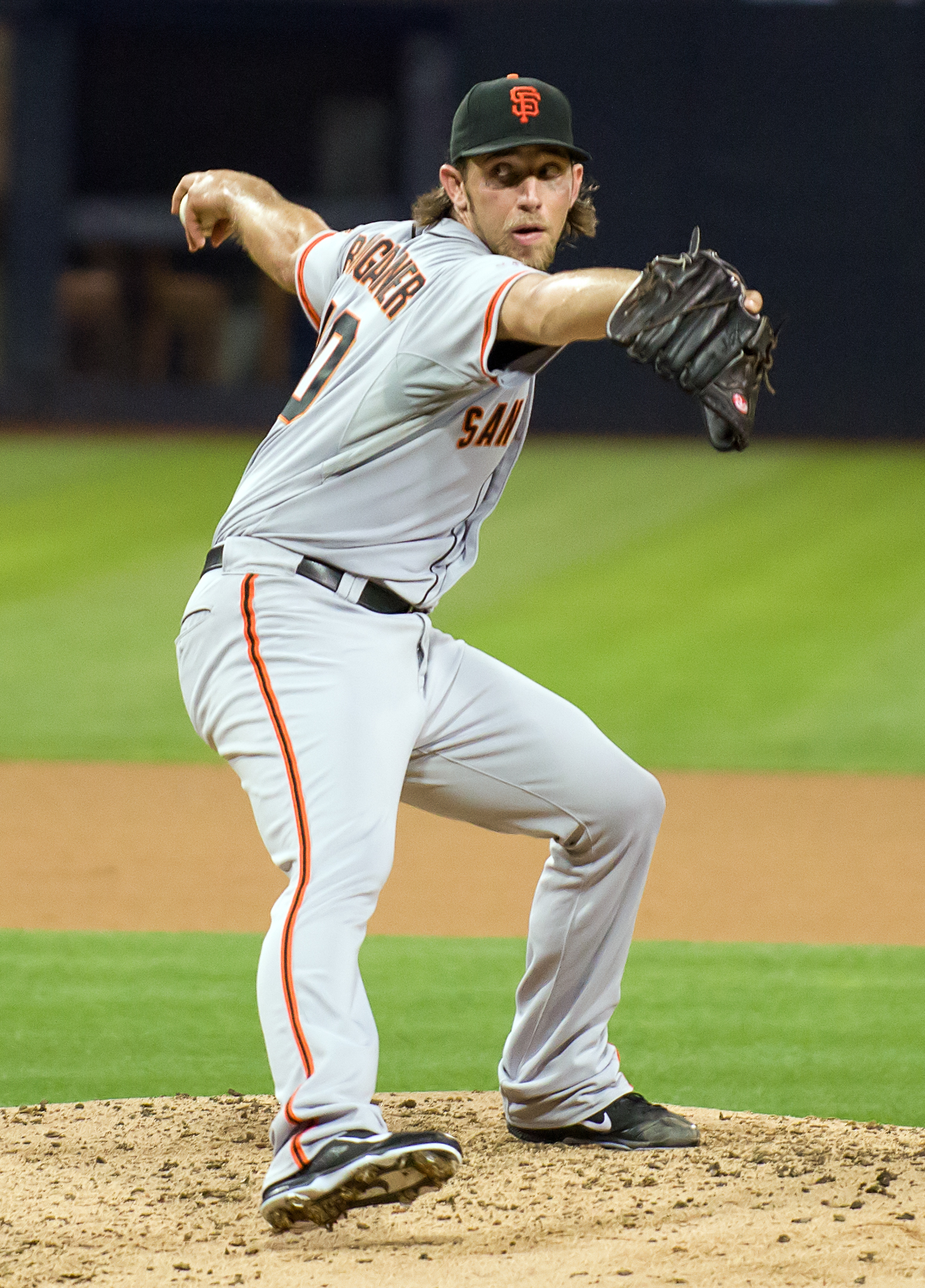
Madison Bumgarner became only the third pitcher to throw a shutout with at least 10 strikeouts in a deciding postseason game.

October 1, 2014 8:09 pm (EDT) at PNC Park, Pittsburgh, Pennsylvania, 63 °F (17 °C), cloudy
Team	1	2	3	4	5	6	7	8	9	R	H	E
San Francisco	0	0	0	4	0	1	2	1	0	8	11	2
Pittsburgh	0	0	0	0	0	0	0	0	0	0	4	0
WP: Madison Bumgarner (1–0) LP: Edinson Vólquez (0–1); Home runs: SF: Brandon Crawford (1); PIT: None; Attendance: 40,629; Boxscore

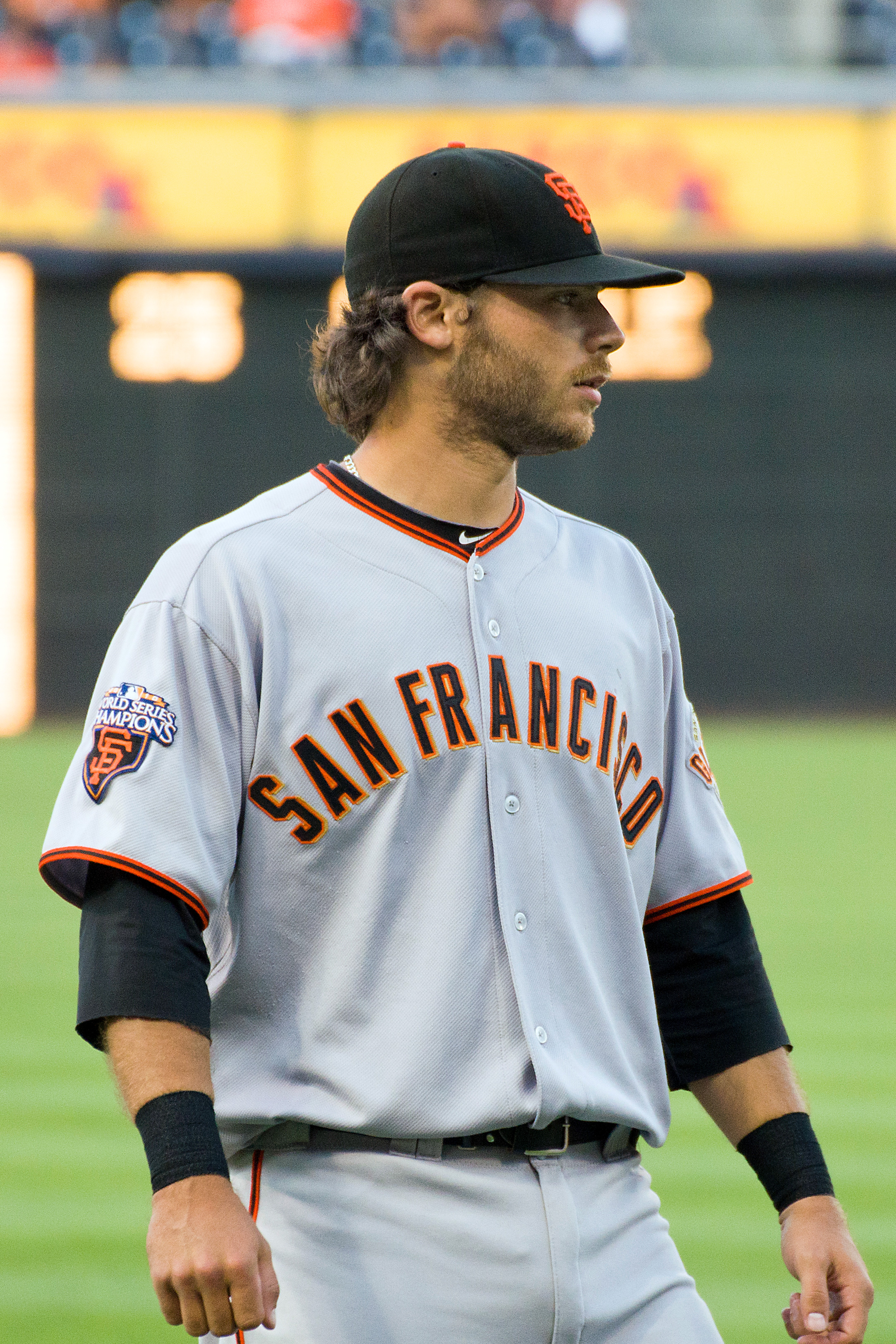
In the fourth inning, Brandon Crawford hit the first postseason grand slam by a shortstop.

For the Wild Card Game, the Pirates started Edinson Vólquez, who had a 13–7 win–loss record and 3.04 earned run average (ERA) in 31 games started during the 2014 season. Hurdle picked him over the team's other available starters – Francisco Liriano (who would have been pitching on only three days' rest) and Jeff Locke, who pitched erratically throughout the year. The Giants selected left-hander Madison Bumgarner, who had an 18–10 win–loss record and 2.98 ERA during the season, as their starting pitcher. He was chosen over Jake Peavy, given the southpaw's superior record on the road during the season; Bumgarner compiled an 11–4 win–loss record with a 2.22 ERA on the road, compared to a 7–6 record and 4.03 ERA at AT&T Park.

The first third of the game was a tight scoreless pitcher's duel between Volquez and Bumgarner, with the latter needing to throw just 28 pitches – the fewest pitches he has ever tossed in three consecutive innings of any game in his career. Only one batter – Giants' third baseman Pablo Sandoval – was able to advance as far as second base during this time. The game remained scoreless until the fourth inning, when Volquez gave up two singles and a walk to load the bases. The subsequent batter, Brandon Crawford, hit a grand slam. This was the first grand slam hit by a shortstop in postseason history. Up until this point, players from all other positions in baseball – including pitcher – had hit postseason grand slams. Volquez pitched until the top of the sixth inning, when he gave up a walk and was replaced by Justin Wilson, who promptly threw a wild pitch. Wilson then allowed the inherited runner to score on a run batted in (RBI) single by Brandon Belt, who ended up driving in two more runs in the seventh inning with another single. The Giants added their final run of the game with an RBI single by Buster Posey in the top of the eighth.

The Pirates, who had struggled to score a run off Bumgarner throughout the entire game, came closest in the bottom of the eighth inning. With one out, they had runners at the corners after two errors and a single. He extinguished the threat by striking out Jordy Mercer and having reigning NL MVP Andrew McCutchen ground into a force out. Although Giants manager Bruce Bochy instructed closer Sergio Romo to warm up in the bullpen – in preparation of removing Bumgarner from the game – the starter insisted on continuing into the bottom of the ninth. He proceeded to pitch a perfect inning to finish the shutout, giving up four singles and one walk while striking out 10 during the complete game. In contrast, the entire Pirates' lineup batted .125 that night; excluding Josh Harrison's 2-for-4 performance, the rest of the team hit 2-for-28 (.071).

== Aftermath ==
By winning the game, San Francisco secured the team's seventh NLDS appearance in franchise history since the permanent implementation of the Division Series after the 1994 season. They also extended their record for most consecutive victories in postseason elimination games to seven. This tied the Kansas City Royals, who had just extended their record the night before. Bumgarner became just the third pitcher – after Sandy Koufax (in the 1965 World Series) and Justin Verlander (in the 2012 American League Division Series) – to pitch a shutout with at least 10 strikeouts in a deciding postseason game.

The Giants played the Washington Nationals in the NLDS. The second game of that series saw San Francisco win 2–1 after 18 innings. Lasting 6 hours and 23 minutes, it was the longest postseason game in history in terms of time elapsed, and was the joint-longest in terms of innings (tied with the 4th game of the 2005 NLDS between the Houston Astros and the Braves). Although the Nationals won the next game against Bumgarner – ending the Giants' NL record of 10 consecutive postseason games won – San Francisco triumphed in Game 4 to clinch the series 3–1 and advance to the NL Championship Series (NLCS).

The NLCS was played between Giants and the St. Louis Cardinals in a rematch of the NLCS two years before. The Giants won the series 4–1, attaining the NL pennant and advancing to the World Series for the third time in five years. They faced the Kansas City Royals in only the second Fall Classic played between two wild card teams, and the first since the 2002 World Series when San Francisco lost to the Anaheim Angels in seven games. The Giants won the series in seven games, becoming the sixth Wild Card team to win the World Series.
