= Jean Machi =

Venezuelan baseball player (born 1982)

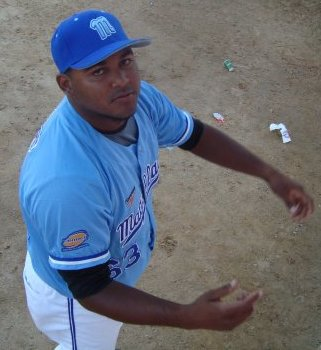
- Machi with Navegantes del Magallanes
- Pitcher
- Born: February 1, 1982 (age 44); El Tigre, Venezuela
- Batted: Right Threw: Right

MLB debut
- September 3, 2012, for the San Francisco Giants

Last MLB appearance
- May 12, 2017, for the Seattle Mariners

MLB statistics
- Win–loss record: 13–2
- Earned run average: 3.38
- Strikeouts: 152
- Saves: 6
- Stats at Baseball Reference

Teams
- San Francisco Giants (2012–2015); Boston Red Sox (2015); Seattle Mariners (2017)

Career highlights and awards
- World Series champion (2014)

Jean Manuel Machi (born February 1, 1982) is a Venezuelan former professional baseball pitcher. He played in Major League Baseball (MLB) for the San Francisco Giants, Boston Red Sox and Seattle Mariners. He was with the Giants for their 2012 World Series and 2014 World Series seasons.

== Early life ==
Jean Manuel Machi was born on February 1, 1982, in El Tigre, Venezuela.

== Professional career ==
=== Minor leagues ===
On February 22, 2000, Machi signed with the Philadelphia Phillies organization as an international free agent. He made his professional debut that year for La Victoria of the Venezuelan Summer League. The following season, Machi pitched for Philadelphia's new VSL affiliate in Mariara, then returned to the club to start the 2002 season before earning a promotion to the Gulf Coast League's GCL Phillies during the season. In the Gulf Coast League he posted a 1.00 ERA in 10 games. The following year, Machi pitched in 8 games for the Low-A Batavia Muckdogs, logging a 2–4 record and 4.78 ERA with 19 strikeouts in 32.0 innings pitched. He spent 2004 back in the Venezuelan Summer League with Tronconero 1.

On December 13, 2004, Machi was selected by the Tampa Bay Rays organization in the minor league phase of the Rule 5 draft. He split the 2005 season between the High-A Visalia Oaks and the Double-A Montgomery Biscuits, recording a cumulative 3–11 record and 6.36 ERA in 32 appearances. He returned to Montgomery the following year, and improved his performance, recording a 6–1 record and 2.64 ERA in 49 games. On October 15, 2006, Machi elected free agency.

On October 31, 2006, Machi signed a minor league contract with the Toronto Blue Jays organization. He spent the 2007 season with the Double-A New Hampshire Fisher Cats, and posted a 2–4 record and 3.53 ERA in 48 games. He returned to New Hampshire in 2008 and logged a 2–6 record and 4.65 ERA with 51 strikeouts in 69.2 innings of work. On November 12, 2008, Machi was released by the Blue Jays organization.

On February 13, 2009, Machi signed a minor league contract with the Pittsburgh Pirates organization. He split the year between the Triple-A Indianapolis Indians and the Double-A Altoona Curve, accumulating a 3–4 record and 2.09 ERA in 41 appearances. For the 2010 season, Machi returned to Indianapolis and pitched to a 5–5 record and 3.92 ERA with 58 strikeouts in as many appearances. On November 6, 2010, he elected free agency.

On February 9, 2011, Machi signed a minor league contract with the San Francisco Giants. He played in 3 games for the Triple-A Fresno Grizzlies before he was loaned to the Diablos Rojos del México of the Mexican League for the rest of the season. In 48 games with the Diablos, Machi recorded a 3–1 record and 2.30 ERA. He was assigned to Triple-A Fresno to begin the 2012 season, where he served as the team's closer.

=== San Francisco Giants (2012–2015) ===
On September 1, 2012, Machi was selected to the 40-man roster by the Giants and promoted to the major leagues for the first time. On September 3, Machi made his major league debut, against the Arizona Diamondbacks, pitching a perfect inning. He finished his rookie season with a 6.75 ERA in 8 major league games. In 2013, Machi made 51 appearances for the Giants out of the bullpen, pitching to a 2.38 ERA with 51 strikeouts in 53.0 innings of work.

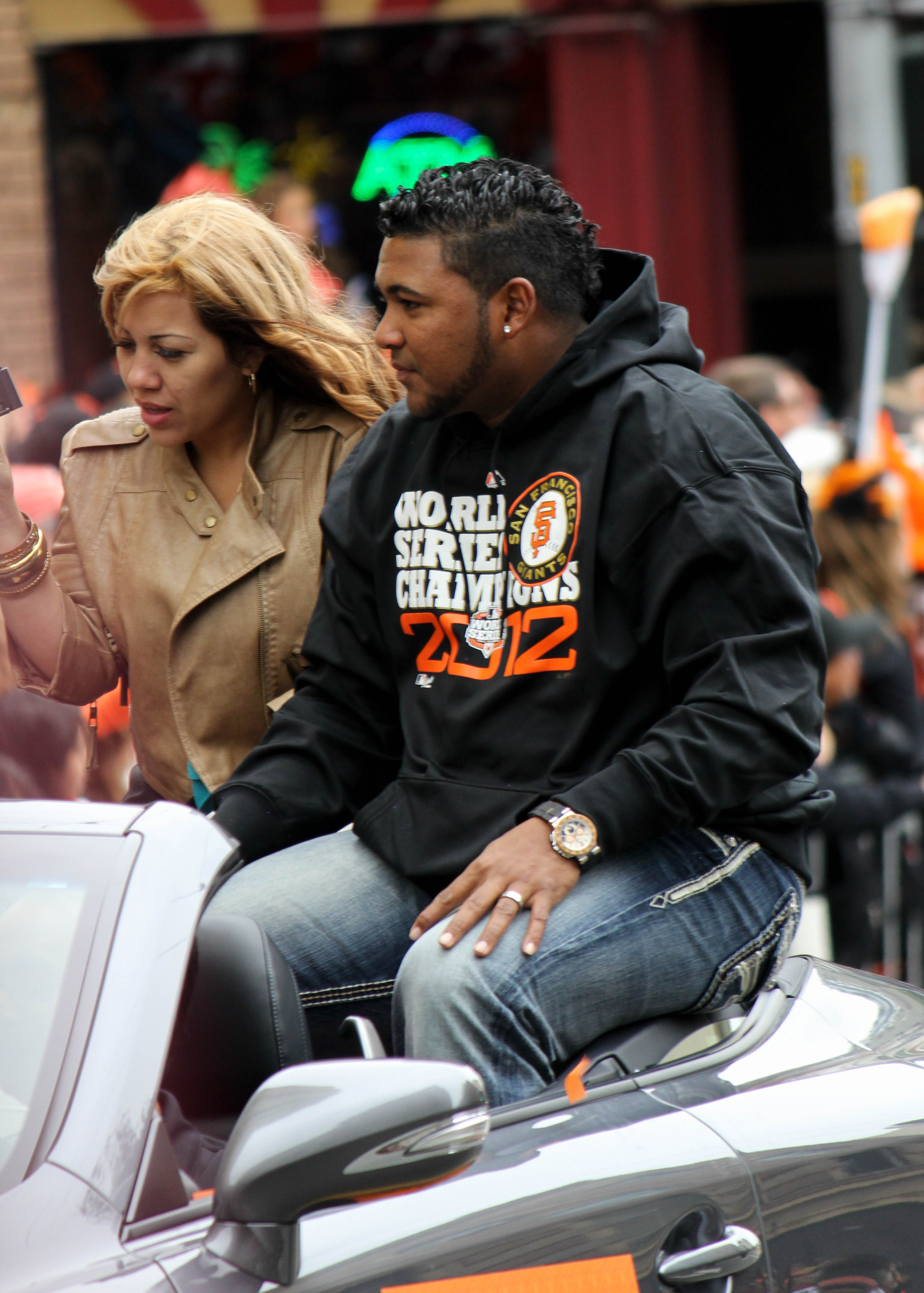
Machi at the 2012 World Series victory parade

At the start of the 2014 season, Machi picked up three relief wins in his team's first 15 games, becoming the first Giants pitcher to do so since Bob Shaw in 1964. He finished the year with a 7–1 record and 2.58 ERA in 71 appearances for the team. Machi hit some struggles in 2015, and was designated for assignment by the Giants on July 20, 2015, after posting a 5.14 ERA in 33 appearances.

=== Boston Red Sox (2015) ===
On July 28, 2015, Machi was claimed off waivers by the Boston Red Sox and starter Clay Buchholz was transferred from the 15- to the 60-day disabled list to make space for him on the 40-man roster. In 26 appearances for Boston, Machi recorded a 5.09 ERA with 20 strikeouts in 23.0 innings of work. On November 6, 2015, Machi was outrighted off of the 40-man roster and elected free agency the same day.

=== Chicago Cubs ===
On December 14, 2015, Machi signed a minor league contract with an invitation to spring training with the Chicago Cubs organization. After registering a 2–1 record and 3.68 ERA in 20 games for the Triple-A Iowa Cubs, Machi was released on June 5, 2016.

=== San Francisco Giants (second stint) ===
On June 16, 2016, Machi signed a minor league contract with the San Francisco Giants organization. He finished the year with the Triple-A Sacramento River Cats, posting a 2–2 record and 3.62 ERA in 28 appearances. On November 7, 2016, Machi elected free agency.

=== Seattle Mariners (2017) ===
On January 30, 2017, Machi signed a minor league contract with the Seattle Mariners organization. He started the season with the Triple-A Tacoma Rainiers, and the Mariners selected his contract on May 2. He was designated for assignment on May 13 after recording a 1.17 ERA in 5 appearances. He was outrighted to Tacoma and posted a 2–4 record and 3.44 ERA in 29 games for the team.

=== Chicago White Sox ===
On July 21, 2017, Machi was traded to the Chicago White Sox, along with fellow veteran pitcher Mark Lowe, in exchange for cash considerations. He was assigned to the Triple-A Charlotte Knights upon acquisition. In 12 appearances with Charlotte, Machi logged a 5–0 record and 3.60 ERA with 28 strikeouts in 30.0 innings pitched. On October 2, 2017, Machi elected free agency.

=== Diablos Rojos del México (second stint) ===
On February 7, 2018, Machi signed with the Diablos Rojos del México of the Mexican Baseball League. He was released on July 2, after he recorded a 5–3 record and 5.20 ERA in 28 games.

=== Sugar Land Skeeters ===
On July 15, 2018, Machi signed with the Sugar Land Skeeters of the Atlantic League of Professional Baseball. In 22 games for the Skeeters, Machi registered an excellent 0.84 ERA with 21 strikeouts in 21.1 innings of work. He re-signed with the team on May 2, 2019, and was later released on June 28 after struggling to a 6.75 ERA in 25 appearances.

=== West Virginia Power ===
After spending the 2020 season out of baseball, on April 5, 2021, Machi signed with the West Virginia Power of the Atlantic League of Professional Baseball. In 11 relief appearances, Machi registered a 2–1 record, 5.23 ERA, and 14 strikeouts.

=== Sultanes de Monterrey ===
On July 8, 2021, Machi's contract was purchased by the Sultanes de Monterrey of the Mexican League. He was released following the season on October 20, 2021.

== Personal life ==
On June 9, 2016, Machi was arrested in Des Moines, Iowa for public intoxication, and urinating in public.

== See also ==
- List of Major League Baseball players from Venezuela
