= Juan Pérez (outfielder) =

Dominican baseball player (born 1986)

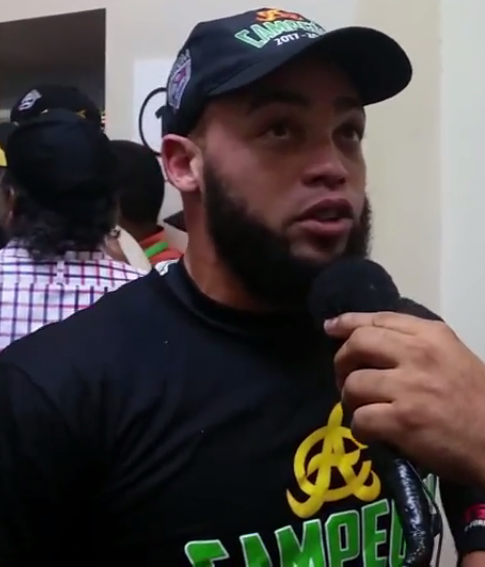
- Pérez with Águilas Cibaeñas in 2018
- Outfielder
- Born: November 13, 1986 (age 39); Santiago, Dominican Republic
- Batted: Right Threw: Right

MLB debut
- June 9, 2013, for the San Francisco Giants

Last MLB appearance
- September 20, 2015, for the San Francisco Giants

MLB statistics
- Batting average: .224
- Home runs: 2
- Runs batted in: 13
- Stats at Baseball Reference

Teams
- San Francisco Giants (2013–2015)

Career highlights and awards
- World Series champion (2014)

Juan Carlos Pérez (born November 13, 1986) is a Dominican former professional baseball outfielder. He played in Major League Baseball (MLB) for the San Francisco Giants and won the World Series with the club in 2014.

== Early life ==
Juan Carlos Pérez was born on November 13, 1986, in Santiago, Dominican Republic. Pérez attended DeWitt Clinton High School in New York City, New York.

== College career ==
After not being selected in the Major League Baseball draft, he attended Western Oklahoma State College.

== Professional career ==
=== Draft and minor leagues ===
The San Francisco Giants drafted Pérez in the 13th round, with the 387th overall selection, of the 2008 Major League Baseball draft. On November 20, 2012, the Giants added Pérez to their 40-man roster to protect him from the Rule 5 draft.

=== San Francisco Giants (2013–2015) ===
Pérez made his MLB debut for the Giants on June 9, 2013, at a game against the Arizona Diamondbacks.

Pérez played in six games and received 14 at-bats during the 2014 World Series. He was chosen to start Game 7 in left field over newly converted first baseman Travis Ishikawa, due to his superior defense. In that game, Pérez made an impressive running catch near the foul line in the fifth inning to rob Norichika Aoki of a double. The catch preserved a 3–2 lead, and Giants eventually won the game and the World Series.

In 2015, Pérez played in 22 games, slashing .282/.300/.359 with no home runs and 2 RBI. On November 6, 2015, he was outrighted off of the 40-man roster and became a free agent.

After the 2015 season, he was selected to the roster for the Dominican Republic national baseball team at the 2015 WBSC Premier12.

=== Chicago Cubs ===
On December 21, 2015, Pérez signed a minor league contract with the Chicago Cubs organization. He spent 2016 with the Triple–A Iowa Cubs, where he batted .276/.310/.444 with nine home runs, 57 RBI, and 16 stolen bases across 117 contests. Pérez elected free agency following the season on November 7, 2016.

=== Detroit Tigers ===
On December 14, 2016, Pérez signed a minor league contract with the Detroit Tigers that included an invitation to spring training. He was released on August 8, 2017.

=== Acereros de Monclova ===
On April 23, 2018, Pérez signed with the Acereros de Monclova of the Mexican Baseball League. He was released on May 4. Pérez re-signed with the team on July 27.

=== Rieleros de Aguascalientes ===
On July 16, 2019, Pérez was traded to the Rieleros de Aguascalientes of the Mexican League. He was released on January 24, 2020. In 28 games he hit .321/.392/.509 with 4 home runs and 17 RBI.

After the 2020 season, Pérez played for Águilas Cibaeñas of the Dominican Professional Baseball League(LIDOM). He has also played for Dominican Republic in the 2021 Caribbean Series.

=== Olmecas de Tabasco ===
On April 20, 2021, Pérez signed with the High Point Rockers of the Atlantic League of Professional Baseball. However, prior to the ALPB season on May 15, his contract was purchased by the Olmecas de Tabasco of the Mexican League. In 62 games, Pérez slashed .292/.371/.388 with 1 home run and 27 RBIs. He was released following the season on October 20.

=== Charleston Dirty Birds ===
On April 12, 2022, Pérez signed with the Charleston Dirty Birds of the Atlantic League of Professional Baseball. In 44 games, Pérez batted .298/.352/.494 with 5 home runs and 28 RBI. He became a free agent following the season.

On June 20, 2023, Pérez re–signed with the Dirty Birds. In 73 games for Charleston, he hit .282/.346/.440 with 8 home runs and 51 RBI.

== Coaching career ==
On June 26, 2024, Pérez was announced as the head coach for The Vine Christian Academy in Kissimmee, Florida.
