= Erik Cordier =

American baseball player (born 1986)

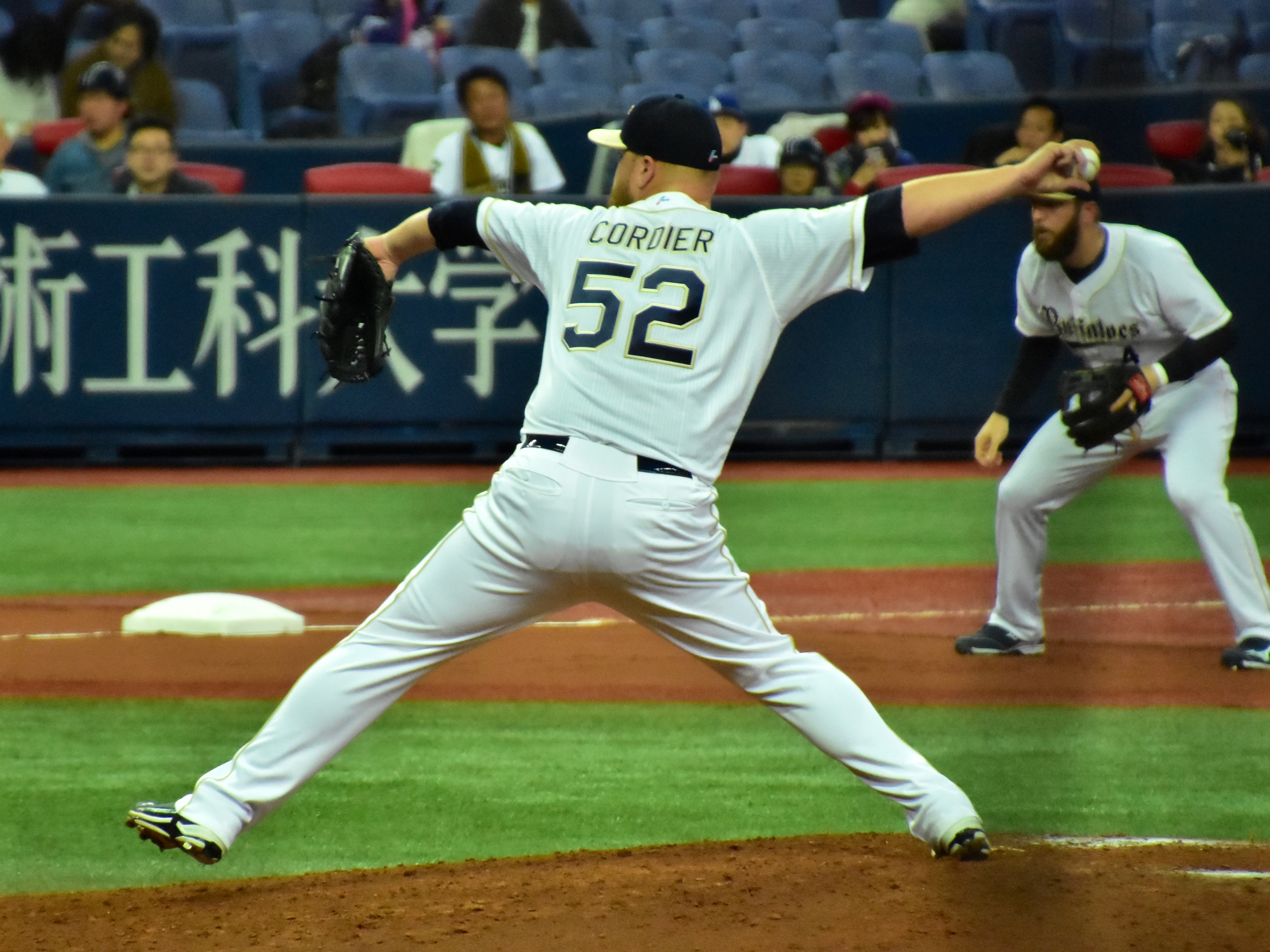
- Cordier with the Orix Buffaloes in 2016
- Pitcher
- Born: February 25, 1986 (age 40); Green Bay, Wisconsin, U.S.
- Batted: Right Threw: Right

Professional debut
- MLB: September 3, 2014, for the San Francisco Giants
- NPB: March 25, 2016, for the Orix Buffaloes

Last appearance
- MLB: September 7, 2015, for the Miami Marlins
- NPB: 2016, for the Orix Buffaloes

MLB statistics
- Win–loss record: 0–0
- Earned run average: 4.42
- Strikeouts: 16

NPB statistics
- Win–loss record: 0–2
- Earned run average: 7.30
- Strikeouts: 14
- Stats at Baseball Reference

Teams
- San Francisco Giants (2014); Miami Marlins (2015); Orix Buffaloes (2016)

Erik Michael Cordier (born February 25, 1986) is an American former professional baseball pitcher. He played in Major League Baseball (MLB) for the San Francisco Giants and Miami Marlins, and in Nippon Professional Baseball (NPB) for the Orix Buffaloes.

== Career ==
=== Kansas City Royals ===
The Kansas City Royals selected Cordier in the second round of the 2004 Major League Baseball draft out of Southern Door High School near Brussels in Door County, Wisconsin.

=== Atlanta Braves/Pittsburgh Pirates ===
He was traded from the Royals to the Atlanta Braves for Tony Peña Jr. on March 24, 2007. Cordier played in the Braves organization from 2008 to 2012, and the Pittsburgh Pirates organization in 2013.

=== San Francisco Giants ===
Cordier signed with the San Francisco Giants after the 2013 season, and was added to their 40-man roster.

Cordier was called up to the majors for the first time on September 2, 2014. He made his MLB debut on September 3 with a 101 mph fastball. For the season with the Giants, he was 0–0 with a 1.50 ERA and 9 strikeouts in 6 innings.

Cordier was designated for assignment by the Giants on May 17, 2015. He was outrighted to Triple-A Fresno on May 27, and elected free agency on May 30. On June 1, he was re-signed to a minor league deal by the club, and was released on August 1.

=== Miami Marlins ===
On August 5, 2015, the Miami Marlins signed Cordier to a minor league contract. He was added to the 40-man roster on August 17, and made 8 appearances with the Marlins, logging a 5.84 ERA with 7 strikeouts. His four-seam fastball had the second-highest average speed of any MLB pitcher's pitches in 2015, at 98.4 mph. Cordier elected free agency in October 2015 after being outrighted off Miami's 40-man roster.

=== Orix Buffaloes ===
Cordier signed with the Orix Buffaloes of Nippon Professional Baseball for the 2016 season. With them he was 0–2 with two saves and a 7.30 ERA, and 14 strikeouts in 12 1/3 innings.

=== Boston Red Sox ===
Cordier signed a minor league contract with the Boston Red Sox on January 18, 2017. In 6 games for the Triple–A Pawtucket Red Sox, he went 0–1 with one save and a 5.40 ERA with 15 strikeouts across 8 1/3 innings pitched. Cordier was released by the Red Sox organization on May 16.
