= Brett Bochy =

American baseball player (born 1987)

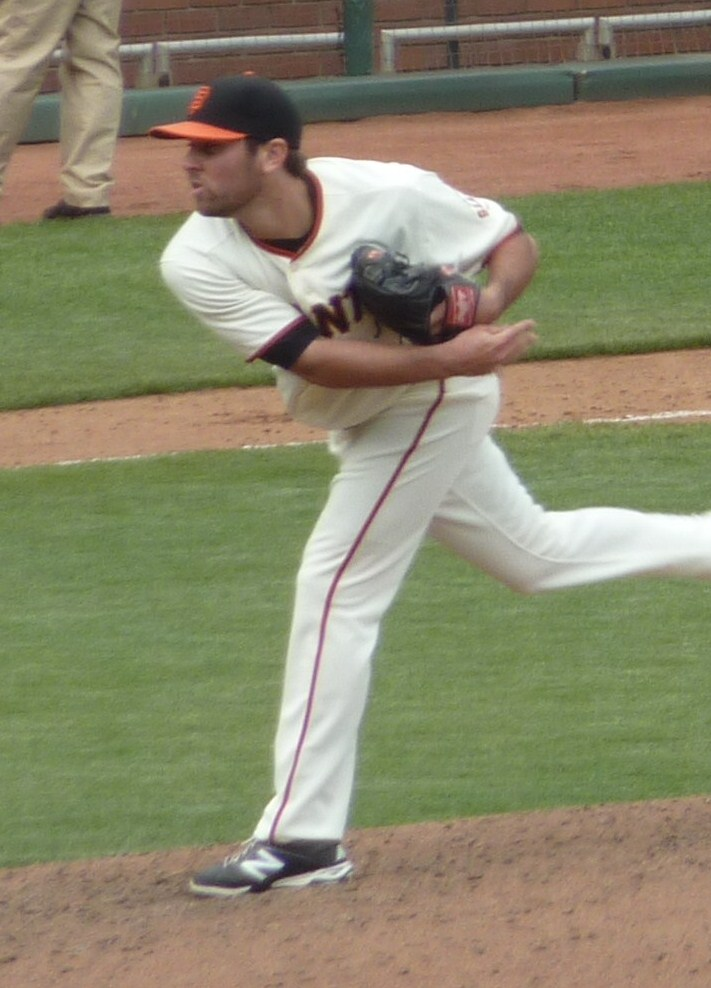
- Bochy pitching for the Giants in 2014
- Pitcher
- Born: August 27, 1987 (age 39); San Diego, California, U.S.
- Batted: Right Threw: Right

MLB debut
- September 13, 2014, for the San Francisco Giants

Last MLB appearance
- October 4, 2015, for the San Francisco Giants

MLB statistics
- Win–loss record: 0–0
- Earned run average: 2.84
- Strikeouts: 6
- Stats at Baseball Reference

Teams
- San Francisco Giants (2014–2015)

Brett Bochy (born August 27, 1987) is an American former professional baseball pitcher and current scout in the Texas Rangers organization. He played Major League Baseball (MLB) for the San Francisco Giants in 2014 and 2015.

== Early life ==
Brett Bochy was born on August 27, 1987, in San Diego, California, to Bruce Bochy and Kim Bochy. Bochy attended Poway High School.

== College career ==
Bochy attended the University of Kansas, playing baseball from 2007–10 and majoring in economics. In his redshirt sophomore year, he recorded a 5–0 record and a bullpen-leading 54 strikeouts.

== Professional career ==
=== Draft and minor leagues ===
Bochy was drafted by the San Francisco Giants in the 20th round (618th overall) of the 2010 Major League Baseball draft.

Bochy began his professional career in 2011 where he played for the Augusta GreenJackets in the Single-A level, making 35 appearances out of the bullpen going 1–0 with a 1.38 ERA, 53 strikeouts, and 10 saves. In 2012, he was promoted to San Francisco's Double-A affiliate, the Richmond Flying Squirrels. With Richmond, Bochy made 41 relief appearances, going 7–3 with a 2.53 ERA, 69 strikeouts, and 14 saves. In 2013, Bochy was promoted to the Giants' Triple-A affiliate, the Fresno Grizzlies. With Fresno, Bochy made 45 relief appearances, going 1–1 with a 3.99 ERA, 57 strikeouts, and two saves across 56 1/3 innings pitched.

Bochy was invited to spring training with the Giants in 2013. He was told by his father, manager Bruce Bochy, over dinner that he had not made the team. Bochy started the 2014 season with the rookie-level team, the Arizona League Giants. He made two anppearances out of the bullpen, recording one win, and was promoted to Triple-A Fresno again. With the Grizzlies, he made 35 appearances going 4–4 with a 3.83 ERA and 47 strikeouts.

=== Major leagues (2014–2015) ===
==== 2014 ====
On September 2, 2014, Bochy was selected to the 40-man roster and promoted to the major leagues for the first time. He made his MLB debut on September 13, escaping a bases loaded jam. Bochy made three appearances for the Giants during his rookie campaign, recording a 5.40 ERA with three strikeouts across 3 1/3 innings pitched. Although the Giants clinched a Wild Card spot with an 88–74 record, Bochy did not participate in their postseason run but he was still eligible to receive his first career championship ring as the Giants won the 2014 World Series over the Kansas City Royals. On November 3, Bochy was removed from the 40-man roster and sent outright to Triple-A Fresno.

==== 2015 ====
Bochy started the season with the Triple-A Sacramento River Cats. On April 5, 2015, the Giants selected Bochy's contract, adding him to their active roster. On July 3, Bochy was designated for assignment by San Francisco. Bochy remained with the organization after clearing waivers and was recalled to the Giants on September 7. He appeared in four games, pitching three innings without allowing a run. On October 19, Bochy was removed from the 40-man roster and sent outright to Triple-A Sacramento.

=== International ===
In 2020, Bochy was selected to the French national baseball team for the 2021 World Baseball Classic qualifier in Arizona. His dad, Bruce, was manager of the team.

== Post-playing-career ==
After the 2015 season, Bochy became a free agent and retired from baseball in order to attend graduate school. Since 2018, he has worked as a real estate agent in the San Diego area.

Bochy was hired as a pro scout by the Texas Rangers in February 2024.

== Personal life ==
Brett is the son of former Padres, Giants, and Texas Rangers manager Bruce Bochy. Brett's brother Greg played four years of minor league baseball with the San Diego Padres organization. His uncle Joe has worked as a scout for the Padres and Giants.
