= Gary Brown (baseball) =

American baseball player (born 1988)

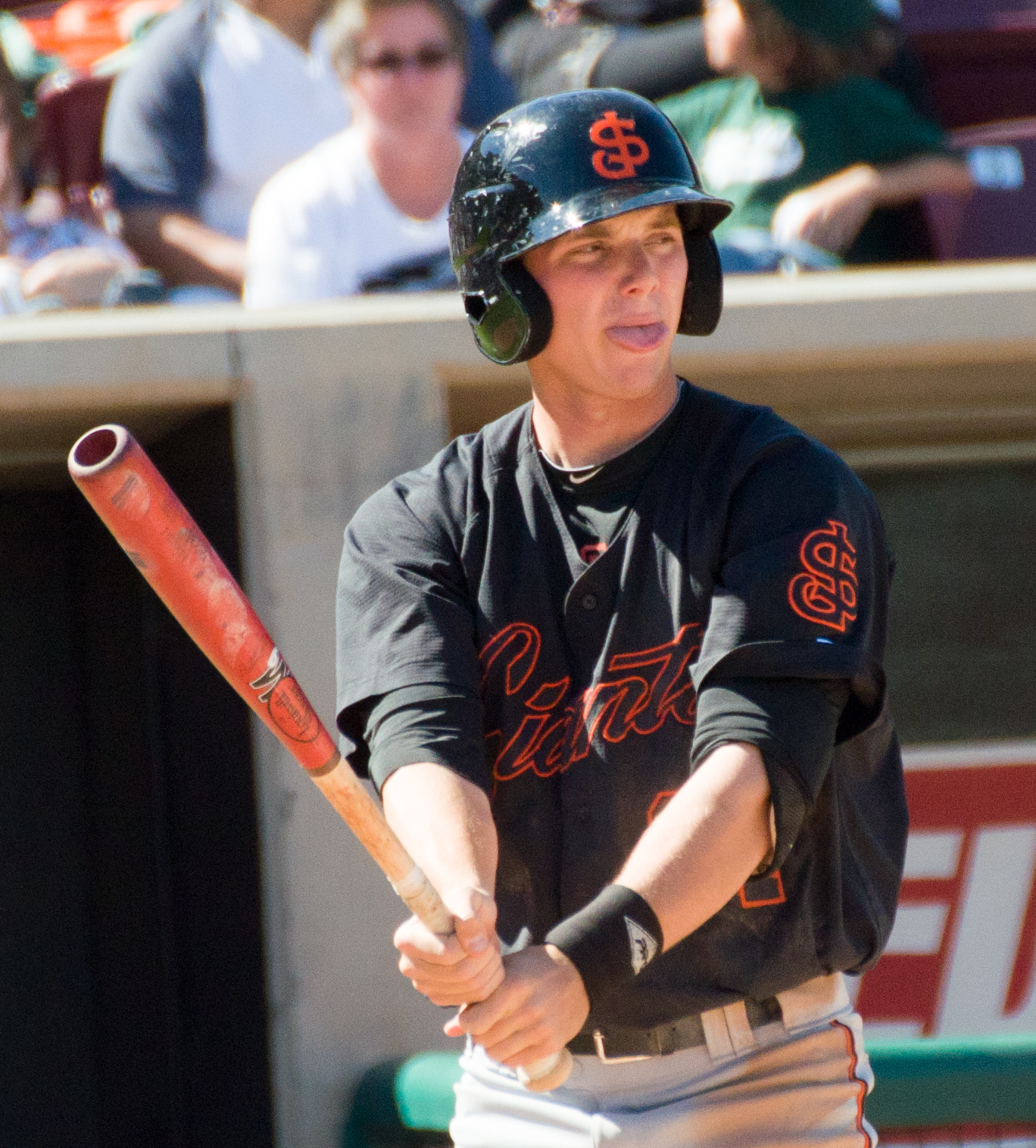
- Brown with the San Jose Giants
- Outfielder
- Born: September 28, 1988 (age 37); Diamond Bar, California, U.S.
- Batted: Right Threw: Right

MLB debut
- September 3, 2014, for the San Francisco Giants

Last appearance
- September 28, 2014, for the San Francisco Giants

MLB statistics
- Batting average: .429
- Home runs: 0
- Runs batted in: 1
- Stats at Baseball Reference

Teams
- San Francisco Giants (2014)

Gary Allen Brown (born September 28, 1988) is an American former professional baseball outfielder. He played in Major League Baseball (MLB) for the San Francisco Giants.

== Amateur career ==
After graduating from Diamond Bar High School, Brown attended California State University, Fullerton, where he played college baseball for the Cal State Fullerton Titans baseball team. Brown was a near consensus All-American in his final season. In 2008 and 2009, he played collegiate summer baseball with the Orleans Firebirds of the Cape Cod Baseball League and was named a league all-star in 2009. He was selected by the San Francisco Giants in the first round (24th overall) of the 2010 First-Year Player Draft, and signed for a $1.45 million bonus.

== Professional career ==
=== San Francisco Giants ===
Brown made his professional debut with the Rookie-level Arizona Giants of the Arizona League and finished the 2010 season with the Single-A Salem-Keizer Volcanoes of the Northwest League. Overall, he hit .159 with two runs batted in (RBI) and two stolen bases in twelve games played.

Brown played the 2011 season with the High–A San Jose Giants of the California League. He was named California League Rookie of the Year. Brown was also selected to participate in the 2011 All-Star Futures Game at Chase Field in Phoenix, Arizona. For the season, he batted .336 in 559 at bats and set a franchise record for hits with 188. He also had 13 triples, 14 home runs and 80 RBIs while stealing 53 bases in 72 attempts. He was named an outfielder on Baseball America's 2011 Minor League All Star team. Brown was added to the Giants 40-man roster on November 20, 2013.

Brown was called up to the majors for the first time on September 2, 2014. He made his MLB debut the next day.

On March 31, 2015, Brown was designated for assignment by the Giants.

=== St. Louis Cardinals ===
On April 3, 2015, Brown was claimed off waivers by the St. Louis Cardinals. In 9 games for the Triple–A Memphis Redbirds, he went 4–for–25 (.160) with one RBI and one walk. Brown was designated for assignment by the Cardinals on April 21, following the promotion of Mitch Harris.

=== Los Angeles Angels ===
On April 22, 2015, Brown was claimed off waivers by the Los Angeles Angels of Anaheim. In 102 games for the Triple–A Salt Lake Bees, he batted .247/.297/.379 with 7 home runs, 47 RBI, and 14 stolen bases. Brown was released by the Angels organization on March 31, 2016.

=== Southern Maryland Blue Crabs ===
On April 17, 2016, Brown signed with the Southern Maryland Blue Crabs of the Atlantic League of Professional Baseball. In 113 games for the team, he hit .249/.302/.379 with 10 home runs, 40 RBI, and 21 stolen bases.

Brown re–signed with the team on February 2, 2017 as a player/coach, serving as the team's hitting coach for the year. In 31 games, he slashed .298/.351/.430 with 4 home runs, 15 RBI, and 12 stolen bases. Brown announced his retirement from professional baseball on July 5.

== Personal life ==
In July 2020, Brown appeared on the television show American Ninja Warrior in the Fourth Qualifying Round in St. Louis.
