= Héctor Sánchez (baseball) =

Venezuelan baseball player (born 1989)

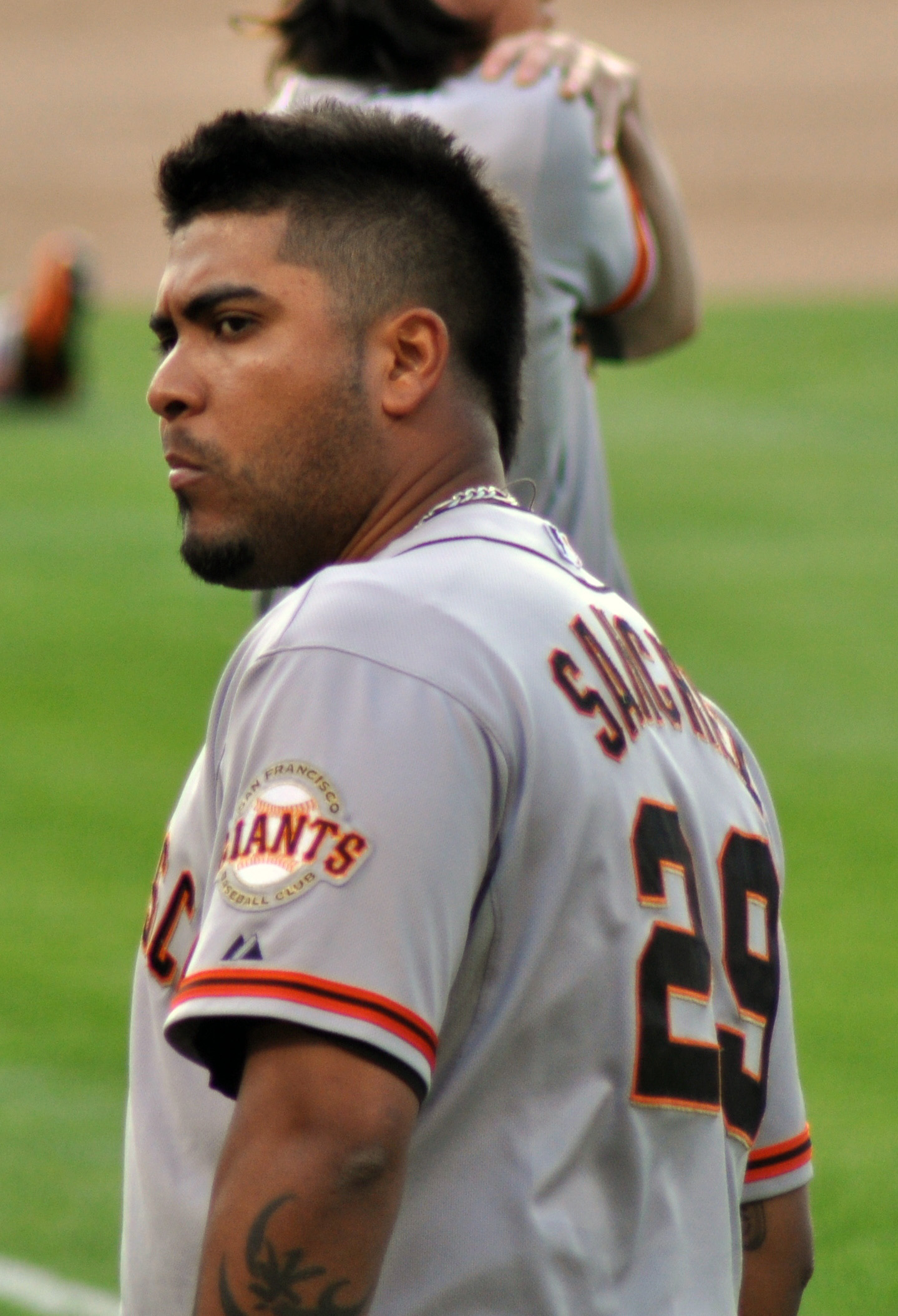
- Sánchez with the Giants in 2012
- Catcher
- Born: November 17, 1989 (age 36); Maracay, Venezuela
- Batted: Switch Threw: Right

MLB debut
- July 15, 2011, for the San Francisco Giants

Last MLB appearance
- October 1, 2017, for the San Diego Padres

MLB statistics (through 2017 season)
- Batting average: .238
- Home runs: 21
- Runs batted in: 120
- Stats at Baseball Reference

Teams
- San Francisco Giants (2011–2015); Chicago White Sox (2016); San Diego Padres (2016–2017)

Career highlights and awards
- World Series champion (2012)

Héctor Enrique Sánchez (born November 17, 1989) is a Venezuelan former professional baseball catcher. He played in Major League Baseball (MLB) for the San Francisco Giants, Chicago White Sox, and San Diego Padres.

== Career ==
=== San Francisco Giants ===
In 2011, after hitting .302 with 11 home runs and 58 RBI in 52 games for the San Jose Giants, Sánchez was promoted to the Fresno Grizzlies. Sánchez was called up to the majors for the first time on July 15, 2011.

He was selected to join the Giants' 2012 Opening Day roster as the backup catcher behind Buster Posey. Due to their pairing during Barry Zito's rehab stint at Triple-A in 2011, and their continued success together at the major-league level in 2012, he had been designated as Zito's personal catcher. On April 23, 2012, Sánchez hit his first career home run off of Dillon Gee. On May 6, 2012, Sánchez hit a pitch-hit, walk-off single against the Milwaukee Brewers despite a five-man infield. On May 21, Sánchez hit his second career homer in the top of the 14th inning, against the Brewers again, to help the Giants win 4–3. In 2012, Sánchez appeared in 74 games, batting .280 with 3 home runs and 34 RBI. He was the backup catcher during the 2012 postseason, which culminated in the Giants winning the 2012 World Series.

In 2013, Sánchez played in 63 games, batting .248 with 3 home runs and 19 RBI. On August 15, 2013, he hit a pinch-hit, 3-run home run off Washington Nationals closer Rafael Soriano with two outs in the top of the ninth inning. The Giants were trailing 3–1 and held on to win 4–3. On April 23, 2014, Sánchez hit his first career grand slam in the top of the 11th inning against the Colorado Rockies. On June 25, 2014, Sánchez was the catcher for Tim Lincecum's second no-hitter against the San Diego Padres. Sánchez went on the concussion list on July 26 and suffered a second concussion while on a rehab assignment and missed the rest of the 2014 season.

On July 21, 2015, Sánchez hit his second career grand slam off Dale Thayer of the San Diego Padres. In early September, Sánchez strained his left hamstring and sprained his left ankle running to first base and missed the rest of the season. After the season, Sánchez was not tendered a contract by the Giants and became a free agent.

=== Chicago White Sox ===
On December 14, 2015, Sánchez signed a minor league deal with an invitation to spring training with the Chicago White Sox. The White Sox promoted Sánchez to the major leagues on April 26, 2016. He was designated for assignment on May 9.

=== San Diego Padres ===
After being designated by the White Sox, Sanchez was claimed by the San Diego Padres and added to the 25-man roster. On June 14, he was designated for assignment and outrighted to the Triple-A El Paso Chihuahuas. For the season, he had the third-slowest baserunning sprint speed of all major league players, at 22.9 feet/second.

He was non-tendered in the 2016 offseason, and signed a minor league contract with the Padres on December 13, 2016. He elected free agency on November 6, 2017.

=== San Francisco Giants (second stint) ===
On January 5, 2018, Sánchez returned to the San Francisco Giants organization on a minor league contract. He was released from the Triple-A Sacramento River Cats on May 27.

=== Detroit Tigers ===
On January 21, 2019, Sánchez signed a minor-league deal with the Detroit Tigers that included an invite to Spring Training. He was released on March 28, 2019.

=== Long Island Ducks ===
On April 8, 2019, Sánchez signed with the Long Island Ducks of the Atlantic League of Professional Baseball. In 98 appearances for Long Island, he batted .273/.308/.406 with nine home runs and 58 RBI. Sánchez became a free agent following the season.

On November 30, 2020, Sánchez signed with the Ottawa Titans of the Frontier League. However, he did not appear in a game for the team before he was traded.

On April 17, 2021, Sánchez was traded to the Long Island Ducks of the Atlantic League of Professional Baseball in exchange for future considerations. In 82 games, Sánchez slashed .247/.324/.495 with 18 home runs and 70 RBI.

Following the 2021 season, Sánchez was traded back to the Ottawa Titans of the Frontier League. On October 22, 2021, Sánchez was traded by the Titans to the Gateway Grizzlies of the Frontier League. However he would never play a game for the Grizzlies as he left them on January 24, 2022.

=== Cleburne Railroaders ===
On January 24, 2022, Sánchez signed with the Cleburne Railroaders of the American Association of Professional Baseball. In 65 appearances for Cleburne, he hit .220/.294/.353 with eight home runs, 32 RBI, and one stolen base.

=== Milwaukee Milkmen ===
On August 16, 2022, Sánchez was traded to the Milwaukee Milkmen of the American Association of Professional Baseball. Sánchez played in 19 games for Milwaukee, slashing .386/.450/.671 with 5 home runs and 18 RBI. He was released by the team on April 13, 2023.

=== Kane County Cougars ===
On July 27, 2023, Sánchez signed with the Kane County Cougars of the American Association of Professional Baseball. In 29 games for Kane County, he batted .266/.346/.330 with one home run and 18 RBI.

=== Long Island Ducks ===
On September 16, 2023, Sánchez was traded to the Long Island Ducks of the Atlantic League of Professional Baseball in exchange for a player to be named later. In two games with the Ducks, Sánchez slashed .143/.333/.143 with two RBI.

=== Karachi Monarchs ===
On October 23, 2023, Sánchez was selected in the fourth round by the Karachi Monarchs, with the 30th overall pick, of the 2023 Baseball United inaugural draft.

=== Tecolotes de los Dos Laredos ===
On November 28, 2023, Sánchez signed with the Tecolotes de los Dos Laredos of the Mexican League. In 44 games for the Tecolotes in 2024, he batted .241/.303/.407 with four home runs and 14 RBI. Sánchez was released by the Tecolotes on December 18, 2024.

=== Caciques de Distrito ===
On April 17, 2025, Sánchez signed with the Caciques de Distrito of the Venezuelan Major League.

== See also ==
- List of Major League Baseball players from Venezuela
