= 2014 Cincinnati Reds season =

2014 Cincinnati Reds
- League: National League
- Division: Central
- Ballpark: Great American Ball Park
- City: Cincinnati, Ohio
- Record: 76–86 (.469)
- Divisional place: 4th
- Owners: Bob Castellini
- General managers: Walt Jocketty
- Managers: Bryan Price
- Television: Fox Sports Ohio (Thom Brennaman, Chris Welsh, Jim Kelch, George Grande, Jeff Brantley, Jim Day, Jeff Piecoro
- Radio: WLW (700 AM); Reds Radio Network (Marty Brennaman, Jeff Brantley, Jim Kelch, Thom Brennaman)
- Stats: ESPN.com; Baseball Reference

The 2014 Cincinnati Reds season was the 145th season for the franchise in Major League Baseball and their 12th at Great American Ball Park. They finished 76–86, in fourth place in the National League Central.

== Standings ==
=== National League Central ===
NL Central
Team	W	L	Pct.	GB	Home	Road
St. Louis Cardinals	90	72	.556	—	51‍–‍30	39‍–‍42
Pittsburgh Pirates	88	74	.543	2	51‍–‍30	37‍–‍44
Milwaukee Brewers	82	80	.506	8	42‍–‍39	40‍–‍41
Cincinnati Reds	76	86	.469	14	44‍–‍37	32‍–‍49
Chicago Cubs	73	89	.451	17	41‍–‍40	32‍–‍49

=== National League ===
Division leaders
Team	W	L	Pct.
Washington Nationals	96	66	.593
Los Angeles Dodgers	94	68	.580
St. Louis Cardinals	90	72	.556

Wild Card teams (Top 2 teams qualify for postseason)
Team	W	L	Pct.	GB
Pittsburgh Pirates	88	74	.543	—
San Francisco Giants	88	74	.543	—
Milwaukee Brewers	82	80	.506	6
New York Mets	79	83	.488	9
Atlanta Braves	79	83	.488	9
Miami Marlins	77	85	.475	11
San Diego Padres	77	85	.475	11
Cincinnati Reds	76	86	.469	12
Philadelphia Phillies	73	89	.451	15
Chicago Cubs	73	89	.451	15
Colorado Rockies	66	96	.407	22
Arizona Diamondbacks	64	98	.395	24

=== Record vs. opponents ===
2014 National League record Source: MLB Standings Grid – 2014
Team	AZ	ATL	CHC	CIN	COL	LAD	MIA	MIL	NYM	PHI	PIT	SD	SF	STL	WSH	AL
Arizona	–	3–3	5–2	3–4	9–10	4–15	3–4	3–4	2–4	2–4	3–4	12–7	6–13	1–5	1–6	7–13
Atlanta	3–3	–	5–1	5–2	4–3	1–6	9–10	5–2	9–10	11–8	3–4	3–4	1–5	2–4	11–8	7–13
Chicago	2–5	1–5	–	8–11	5–2	3–4	4–2	11–8	5–2	3–3	5–14	3–4	2–4	9–10	3–4	9–11
Cincinnati	4–3	2–5	11–8	–	3–4	3–4	4–3	10–9	2–4	3–3	12–7	1–5	5–2	7–12	3–3	6–14
Colorado	10–9	3–4	2–5	4–3	–	6–13	3–4	1–6	3–4	3–3	2–4	10–9	10–9	1–5	1–5	7–13
Los Angeles	15–4	6–1	4–3	4–3	13–6	–	3–3	1–5	4–2	3–4	2–5	12–7	10–9	4–3	2–4	11–9
Miami	4–3	10–9	2–4	3–4	4–3	3–3	–	3–4	8–11	9–10	2–4	3–4	3–4	4–2	6–13	13–7
Milwaukee	4–3	2–5	8–11	9–10	6–1	5–1	4–3	–	4–3	3–4	12–7	3–3	2–4	7–12	2–4	11–9
New York	4–2	10–9	2–5	4–2	4–3	2–4	11–8	3–4	–	13–6	3–4	3–3	1–6	4–3	4–15	11–9
Philadelphia	4–2	8–11	3–3	3–3	3–3	4–3	10–9	4–3	6–13	–	1–6	4–3	2–5	4–3	10–9	7–13
Pittsburgh	4–3	4–3	14–5	7–12	4–2	5–2	4–2	7–12	4–3	6–1	–	3–3	4–2	8–11	3–4	11–9
San Diego	7–12	4–3	4–3	5–1	9–10	7–12	4–3	3–3	3–3	3–4	3–3	–	10–9	3–4	3–4	9–11
San Francisco	13–6	5–1	4–2	2–5	9–10	9–10	4–3	4–2	6–1	5–2	2–4	9–10	–	4–3	2–5	10–10
St. Louis	5–1	4–2	10–9	12–7	5–1	3–4	2–4	12–7	3–4	3–4	11–8	4–3	3–4	–	5–2	8–12
Washington	6–1	8–11	4–3	3–3	5–1	4–2	13–6	4–2	15–4	9–10	4–3	4–3	5–2	2–5	–	10–10

== Regular season ==
=== Detailed record ===
Team	Home	Away	Total	Win %	Gms Left
NL East
Atlanta Braves	2-2	0–3	2–5	.286	0
Miami Marlins	1-2	3-1	4-3	.571	0
New York Mets	1-2	1–2	2–4	.333	0
Philadelphia Phillies	2–1	1–2	3–3	.500	0
Washington Nationals	1-2	2–1	3–3	.500	0
	7-9	7–9	14–18	.438	0
NL Central
Chicago Cubs	7–3	4–5	11-8	.579	0
Milwaukee Brewers	7–3	3–6	10–9	.526	0
Pittsburgh Pirates	6–3	6–4	12–7	.632	0
St. Louis Cardinals	5–5	2–7	7–12	.368	0
	25–14	15–22	40–36	.526	0
NL West
Arizona Diamondbacks	1–2	3–1	4–3	.571	0
Colorado Rockies	2–1	1-3	3–4	.429	0
Los Angeles Dodgers	2–2	1–2	3–4	.429	0
San Diego Padres	1–2	0-3	1–5	.167	0
San Francisco Giants	1–2	4–0	5–2	.714	0
	7–9	9–9	16–18	.471	0
American League
Cleveland Indians	2-0	1-1	3-1	.750	0
Baltimore Orioles	N/A	0-3	0-3	.000	0
Boston Red Sox	0-2	0–2	0–4	.000	0
New York Yankees	N/A	0-3	0-3	.000	0
Tampa Bay Rays	1–2	N/A	1–2	.333	0
Toronto Blue Jays	2–1	N/A	2–1	.667	0
	5–5	1–9	6–14	.300	0

Month	Games	Won	Lost	Win %
March	1	0	1	.000
April	26	12	14	.462
May	27	13	14	.481
June	28	18	10	.643
July	26	11	15	.423
August	29	12	17	.414
September	25	10	15	.400
	162	76	86	.469

	Games	Won	Lost	Win %
Home	81	44	37	.543
Away	81	32	49	.395

- Most Runs Scored in a game: 14 (9/5 vs. NYM)
- Most Runs Allowed in a game: 18 (9/5 vs. NYM)
- Most Hits in a Game: 19 (6/15 vs. MIL)
- Longest Winning Streak: 5 games (7/6–7/9)
- Longest Losing Streak: 7 games (8/17–8/27)

== Home attendance ==
(through September 27) Source: 2014 MLB Attendance Report

Year	Attendance (games)	AVG/game	NL Rank	W-L
2014	2,476,664 (81)	30,576	8th of 15	44-37
2013	2,492,101 (81)	31,151	10th of 15	49–31
2011	3,093,954 (81)	38,197	3rd of 16 -->	

== Game log ==
2014 game log (76–86)
March/April (12–15)

#	Date	TV	Opponent	Score	Win	Loss	Save	Attendance	Record	Box
1	March 31	Cardinals	FSO	**L** 0–1	Wainwright (1–0)	**Cueto** (0–1)	Rosenthal (1)	43,134	0–1	
2	April 2	Cardinals	FSO	**W** 1–0	**Hoover** (1–0)	Martinez (0–1)		36,189	1–1	
3	April 3	Cardinals	FSO	**L** 6–7	Lynn (1–0)	**Bailey** (0–1)	Rosenthal (2)	16,857	1–2	
4	April 4	@ Mets	FSO	**L** 3–4	Mejia (1–0)	**Leake** (0–1)	Valverde (1)	35,845	1–3	
5	April 5	@ Mets	FSO	**L** 3–6	Torres (1–0)	**Hoover** (1–1)		25,454	1–4	
6	April 6	@ Mets	FSO	**W** 2–1	**Simón** (1–0)	Niese (0–1)	**Parra** (1)	26,928	2–4	
7	April 7	@ Cardinals	FSO	**L** 3–5	Wacha (1–0)	**Cingrani** (0–1)		47,492	2–5	
8	April 8	@ Cardinals	FS1	**L** 5–7	Lynn (2–0)	**Ondrusek** (0–1)	Rosenthal (3)	40,672	2–6	
9	April 9	@ Cardinals	FSO	**W** 4–0	**Leake** (1–1)	Miller (0–2)		41,137	3–6	
10	April 11	Rays	FSO	**L** 1–2	Price (2–0)	**Cueto** (0–2)	Balfour (3)	30,502	3–7	
11	April 12	Rays	FSO	**L** 0–1	Cobb (1–1)	**Simón** (1–1)	Balfour (4)	35,356	3–8	
12	April 13	Rays	FSO	**W** 12–4	**Cingrani** (1–1)	Ramos (0–1)		34,307	4–8	
13	April 14	Pirates	FSO	**L** 7–8	Morris (2–0)	**LeCure** (0–1)	Grilli (4)	17,756	4–9	
14	April 15	Pirates	FSO	**W** 7–5	**Leake** (2–1)	Cole (2–1)	**Broxton** (1)	18,462	5–9	
15	April 16	Pirates	FSO	**W** 4–0	**Cueto** (1–2)	Liriano (0–3)		16,825	6–9	
16	April 18	@ Cubs	FSO	**W** 4–1	**Simón** (2–1)	Samardzija (0–2)	**Broxton** (2)	28,699	7–9	
17	April 19	@ Cubs	FSO	**L** 4–8	Jackson (1–1)	**Cingrani** (1–2)		32,966	7–10	
18	April 20	@ Cubs	FSO	**W** 8–2	**Bailey** (1–1)	Villanueva (1–4)		27,927	8–10	
19	April 21	@ Pirates	FSO/ESPN	**L** 5–6	Hughes (1–0)	**Hoover** (1–2)		12,864	8–11	
20	April 22	@ Pirates	FSO	**W** 4–1	**Cueto** (2–2)	Vólquez (1–1)		11,926	9–11	
21	April 23	@ Pirates	FSO	**W** 5–2	**Simón** (3–1)	Morton (0–3)	**Broxton** (3)	16,705	10–11	
22	April 24	@ Pirates	FSO	**W** 2–1	**Cingrani** (2–1)	Cumpton (0–1)	**Broxton** (4)	18,896	11–11	
23	April 25	@ Braves	FSO	**L** 5–6	Santana (3–0)	**Bailey** (1–2)	Kimbrel (7)	31,111	11–12	
24	April 26	@ Braves	FSO	**L** 1–4	Hale (1–0)	**Leake** (2–2)	Kimbrel (8)	33,702	11–13	
25	April 27	@ Braves	FSO	**L** 0–1 (10)	Thomas (1–0)	**Hoover** (1–3)		31,446	11–14	
—	April 28	Cubs	FSO	PPD, RAIN; rescheduled for July 8 as part of a day-night doubleheader						
26	April 29	Cubs	FSO	**W** 3–2	**Simón** (4–1)	Samardzija (0–3)	**Broxton** (5)	17,579	12–14	
27	April 30	Cubs	FSO	**L** 4–9	Jackson (2–2)	**Christiani** (0–1)		21,847	12–15	

May (13–14)

#	Date	TV	Opponent	Score	Win	Loss	Save	Attendance	Record	Box
28	May 1	Brewers	FSO	**W** 8–3	**Bailey** (2–2)	Henderson (2–1)		16,779	13–15	
29	May 2	Brewers	FSO	**L** 0–2	Peralta (4–1)	**Leake** (2–3)	Rodríguez (14)	32,759	13–16	
30	May 3	Brewers	FSO	**W** 6–2	**Cueto** (3–2)	Gallardo (2–1)		38,243	14–16	
31	May 4	Brewers	FSO	**W** 4–3 (10)	**LeCure** (1–1)	Thornburg (3–1)		32,953	15–16	
32	May 6	@ Red Sox	FSO	**L** 3–4 (12)	Breslow (1–0)	**Ondrusek** (0–2)		36,004	15–17	
33	May 7	@ Red Sox	FSO	**L** 3–4	Breslow (2–0)	**Hoover** (1–4)		37,072	15–18	
34	May 9	Rockies	FSO	**W** 4–3	**Broxton** (1–0)	Logan (1–1)		27,187	16–18	
35	May 10	Rockies	FSO	**L** 2–11	Lyles (5–0)	**Simón** (4–2)		37,984	16–19	
36	May 11	Rockies	FSO	**W** 4–1	**Bailey** (3–2)	Nicasio (4–2)	**Chapman** (1)	33,143	17–19	
37	May 13	Padres	FSO	**L** 1–2	Benoit (1–0)	**Chapman** (0–1)	Street (12)	23,269	17–20	
—	May 14	Padres	PPD, RAIN; rescheduled for May 15 as part of a day-night doubleheader							
38	May 15	Padres	FS1	**W** 5–0	**Cueto** (4–2)	Kennedy (2–5)		27,686	18–20	
39	May 15	Padres	FSO	**L** 1–6	Ross (5–3)	**Francis** (0–1)		23,544	18–21	
40	May 16	@ Phillies	FSO	**W** 3–0	**Simón** (5–2)	Kendrick (0–4)	**Chapman** (2)	27,316	19–21	
41	May 17	@ Phillies	FSO	**L** 1–12	Hamels (1–2)	**Bailey** (3–3)		30,075	19–22	
42	May 18	@ Phillies	FSO	**L** 3–8	Lee (4–4)	**Cingrani** (2–3)		36,096	19–23	
43	May 19	@ Nationals	FSO	**W** 4–3 (15)	**Ondrusek** (1–2)	Detwiler (0–2)		24,505	20–23	
44	May 20	@ Nationals	FSO	**L** 4–9	Fister (1–1)	**Cueto** (4–3)		26,455	20–24	
45	May 21	@ Nationals	FSO	**W** 2–1	**Simón** (6–2)	Roark (3–2)	**Chapman** (3)	28,944	21–24	
46	May 23	Cardinals	FSO	**W** 5–3	**Bailey** (4–3)	Miller (6–3)	**Chapman** (4)	37,271	22–24	
47	May 24	Cardinals	Fox	**L** 3–6	Garcia (1–0)	**Cingrani** (2–4)	Rosenthal (15)	41,585	22–25	
48	May 25	Cardinals	ESPN	**L** 0–4	Wainwright (8–2)	**Leake** (2–4)		42,273	22–26	
49	May 26	@ Dodgers	FSO	**L** 3–4	Ryu (5–2)	**Cueto** (4–4)	Jansen (15)	45,505	22–27	
50	May 27	@ Dodgers	FSO/ESPN	**L** 3–6	Greinke (8–1)	**Simón** (6–3)	Jansen (16)	45,505	22–28	
51	May 28	@ Dodgers	FSO	**W** 3–2	**Bailey** (5–3)	Kershaw (3–2)	**Chapman** (5)	41,129	23–28	
52	May 29	@ Diamondbacks	FSO	**L** 0–4	Collmenter (4–2)	**Cingrani** (2–5)		18,457	23–29	
53	May 30	@ Diamondbacks	FSO	**W** 6–4	**Leake** (3–4)	Arroyo (4–4)	**Chapman** (6)	19,826	24–29	
54	May 31	@ Diamondbacks	FSO	**W** 5–0	**Cueto** (5–4)	McCarthy (1–7)		23,765	25–29	

June (18–10)

#	Date	TV	Opponent	Score	Win	Loss	Save	Attendance	Record	Box
55	June 1	@ Diamondbacks	FSO	**W** 4–3	**Simón** (7–3)	Miley (3–6)	**Chapman** (7)	24,119	26–29	
56	June 3	Giants	FSO	**W** 8–3	**Bailey** (6–3)	Lincecum (4–4)		27,152	27–29	
57	June 4	Giants	FSO	**L** 2–3	Vogelsong (4–2)	**Cingrani** (2–6)	Romo (18)	26,333	27–30	
58	June 5	Giants	FSO	**L** 1–6	Bumgarner (8–3)	**Leake** (3–5)		25,532	27–31	
59	June 6	Phillies	FSO	**L** 8–0	Hamels (2–3)	**Cueto** (5–5)		38,331	27–32	
60	June 7	Phillies	FSO	**W** 6–5	**Simón** (8–3)	Hernández(2–4)	**Chapman** (8)	36,347	27–32	
61	June 8	Phillies	FSO	**W** 4–1	**Bailey** (7–3)	Buchanan (1–3)	**Chapman** (9)	30,222	29–32	
62	June 9	Dodgers	FSO/ESPN	**L** 2–6	Haren (6–4)	**Cingrani** (2–7)		31,915	29–33	
63	June 10	Dodgers	FSO	**L** 1–6	Beckett (4–3)	**Leake** (3–6)		27,692	29–34	
64	June 11	Dodgers	FSO	**W** 5–0	**Cueto** (6–5)	Ryu (7–3)		27,014	30–34	
65	June 12	Dodgers	MLBN	**W** 4–1	**Simón** (9–3)	Greinke (8–3)	**Chapman** (10)	33,557	31–34	
66	June 13	@ Brewers	FSO	**W** 6–5	**Broxton** (2–0)	Rodríguez (2–2)	**Chapman** (11)	38,330	32–34	
67	June 14	@ Brewers	Fox	**L** 2–4	Smith (1–0)	**Hoover** (1–5)	Rodríguez (21)	40,507	32–35	
68	June 15	@ Brewers	FSO	**W** 13–4	**Leake** (3–5)	Estrada (5–4)		42,213	33–35	
69	June 17	@ Pirates	FSO	**W** 6–5	**Ondrusek** (2–2)	Grilli (0–2)	**Chapman** (12)	23,565	34–35	
70	June 18	@ Pirates	FSO	**W** 11–4	**Simón** (10–3)	Vólquez (4–6)		23,329	35–35	
71	June 19	@ Pirates	FSO	**L** 3–4 (12)	Wilson (2–0)	**Cingrani** (2–8)		30,710	35–36	
72	June 20	Blue Jays	FSO	**L** 9–14	McGowan (4–2)	**Chapman** (0–2)		33,103	35–37	
73	June 21	Blue Jays	FSO	**W** 11–1	**Leake** (4–5)	Happ (0–2)		42,530	36–37	
74	June 22	Blue Jays	FSO	**W** 4–3	**Cueto** (7–5)	Dickey (6–6)	**Chapman** (13)	36,089	37–37	
75	June 23	@ Cubs	FSO	**W** 6–1	**Broxton** (3–0)	Rondón (1–2)		27,747	38–37	
76	June 24	@ Cubs	FSO	**L** 3–7	Arrieta (4–1)	**Bailey** (7–4)		28,226	38–38	
77	June 25	@ Cubs	FSO	**W** 4–1	**Latos** (1–0)	Jackson (5–8)	**Chapman** (14)	28,207	39–38	
78	June 26	@ Giants	FSO	**W** 3–1	**Leake** (5–5)	Vogelsong (5–4)	**Chapman** (15)	41,156	40–38	
79	June 27	@ Giants	FSO	**W** 6–2	**Cueto** (8–5)	Bumgarner (9–5)	**Chapman** (16)	41,046	41–38	
80	June 28	@ Giants	FSO	**W** 7–3 (11)	**Broxton** (4–0)	López (1–1)		41,024	42–38	
81	June 29	@ Giants	FSO	**W** 4–0	**Bailey** (8–4)	Hudson (7–5)		41,541	43–38	
82	June 30	@ Padres	FSO	**L** 0–1	Hahn (4–1)	**Latos** (1–1)	Street (22)	19,079	43–39	

July (11–15)

#	Date	TV	Opponent	Score	Win	Loss	Save	Attendance	Record	Box
83	July 1	@ Padres	FSO	**L** 2–8	Kennedy (6–9)	**Leake** (6–7)		20,312	43–40	
84	July 2	@ Padres	FSO	**L** 0–3	Ross (7–8)	**Cueto** (8–6)		19,250	43–41	
85	July 4	Brewers	FSO	**W** 4–2	**Simón** (11–3)	Lohse (9–3)	**Chapman** (17)	42,120	44–41	
86	July 5	Brewers	FSO	**L** 0–1	Garza (6–5)	**Bailey** (8–5)		38,754	44–42	
87	July 6	Brewers	FSO	**W** 4–2	**Latos** (2–1)	Smith (1–2)	**Broxton** (6)	27,923	45–42	
88	July 7	Cubs	FSO	**W** 9–3	**Leake** (7–7)	Jackson (5–9)		26,588	46–42	
89	July 8	Cubs		**W** 4–2	**Cueto** (9–6)	Wood (7–7)	**Chapman** (18)	17,371	47–42	
90	July 8	Cubs	FSO	**W** 6–5	**Ondrusek** (3–2)	Rondón (1–3)		29,991	48–42	
91	July 9	Cubs	FSO	**W** 4–1	**Simón** (12–3)	Beeler (0–2)	**Chapman** (19)	32,810	49–42	
92	July 10	Cubs		**L** 4–6 (12)	Parker (1–0)	**Hoover** (1–6))		31,983	49–43	
93	July 11	Pirates	FSO	**W** 6–5	**Partch** (1–0)	Watson (5–1)	**Chapman** (20)	36,317	50–43	
94	July 12	Pirates	Fox	**L** 5–6 (11)	Wilson (3–1)	**Hoover** (1–7)	Gómez (1)	42,789	50–44	
95	July 13	Pirates	FSO	**W** 6–3	**Cueto** (10–6)	Liriano (5–1)	**Chapman** (21)	35,022	51–44	
**July 15: 2014 MLB All-Star Game – Minneapolis, Minnesota at Target Field**
96	July 18	@ Yankees	FSO	**L** 3–4	Phelps (4–4)	**Leake** (7–8)	Robertson (24)	47,372	51–45	
97	July 19	@ Yankees	FSO	**L** 1–7	McCarthy (4–10)	**Simón** (12–4)		47,606	51–46	
98	July 20	@ Yankees	FSO	**L** 3–4	Robertson (1–2)	**Chapman** (0–3)		43,115	51–47	
99	July 21	@ Brewers	FSO	**L** 2–5	Peralta (4–1)	**Latos** (2–2)	Rodríguez (29)	31,350	51–48	
100	July 22	@ Brewers	FSO	**L** 3–4	Rodríguez (4–3)	**LeCure** (1–2)		33,485	51–49	
101	July 23	@ Brewers	FSO	**L** 1–5	Lohse (11–4)	**Leake** (7–9)		38,192	51–50	
102	July 25	Nationals	FSO	**L** 1–4	Roark (10–6)	**Simón** (12–5)	Soriano (24)	38,812	51–51	
103	July 26	Nationals	FSO/FS1	**W** 1–0	**Cueto** (11–6)	González (6–6)	**Chapman** (22)	32,999	52–51	
104	July 27	Nationals	FSO	**L** 2–4	Fister (10–2)	**Latos** (2–3)	Soriano (25)	31,982	52–52	
105	July 28	Diamondbacks	FSO	**L** 1–2 (15)	Pérez (1–1)	**Hoover** (1–8)	Reed (25)	30,288	52–53	
106	July 29	Diamondbacks	FSO	**W** 3–0	**Leake** (8–9)	Cahill (1–8)	**Chapman** (23)	33,153	53–53	
107	July 30	Diamondbacks	MLBN	**L** 4–5	Miley (7–7)	**Simón** (12–6)	Reed (26)	26,332	53–54	
108	July 31	@ Marlins	FSO	**W** 3–1	**Cueto** (12–6)	Koehler (7–8)	**Chapman** (24)	18,056	54–54	

August (9–14)

#	Date	TV	Opponent	Score	Win	Loss	Save	Attendance	Record	Box
109	August 1	@ Marlins	FSO	**W** 5–2	**Latos** (3–3)	Cosart (9–8)	**Chapman** (25)	20,410	55–54	
110	August 2	@ Marlins	FSO	**L** 1–2 (10)	Dunn (9–5)	**LeCure** (1–3)		25,159	55–55	
111	August 3	@ Marlins	FSO	**W** 7–3	**Leake** (9–9)	Turner (4–7)		26,707	56–55	
112	August 4	@ Indians	FSO	**L** 1–7	Kluber (12–6)	**Simón** (12–7)	Axford (10)	18,696	56–56	
113	August 5	@ Indians	FSO	**W** 9–2	**Cueto** (13–6)	Tomlin (5–8)		22,068	57–56	
114	August 6	Indians	FSO	**W** 8–2	**Latos** (4–3)	Salazar (4–5)		33,863	58–56	
115	August 7	Indians	FSO	**W** 4–0	**Bailey** (8–5)	House (1–3)		31,862	59–56	
116	August 8	Marlins	FSO	**L** 1–2	Eovaldi (6–6)	**Leake** (9–10)	Cishek (28)	31,193	59–57	
117	August 9	Marlins	FSO	**L** 3–4	Penny (1–0)	**LeCure** (1–4)	Cishek (29)	34,768	59–58	
118	August 10	Marlins	FSO	**W** 7–2	**Cueto** (14–6)	Hand (2–4)		36,122	60–58	
119	August 12	Red Sox	FSO	**L** 2–3	Layne (1–0)	**Broxton** (4–1)	Uehara (26)	35,903	60–59	
120	August 13	Red Sox	FSO	**L** 4-5	Ranaudo (2–0)	**Leake** (9–11)	Mujica (3)	32,870	60–60	
121	August 14	@ Rockies	FSO	**L** 3-7	de la Rosa (12–8)	**Simón** (12–8)		32,538	60–61	
122	August 15	@ Rockies	FSO	**W** 3-2	**Cueto** (15–6)	Ottavino (0–4)	**Chapman** (26)	33,668	61–61	
––	August 16	@ Rockies		PPD, Water Main Break; rescheduled for August 17 as part of a day-night doubleheader						
123	August 17	@ Rockies	FSO	**L** 9-10	Brothers (4-5)	**Hoover** (1-9)		42,310	61–62	
124	August 17	@ Rockies	FSO	**L** 5-10	Ottavino (1-4)	**Contreras** (0-1)		33,604	61–63	
125	August 18	@ Cardinals	FSO	**L** 4–5 (10)	Greenwood (2-1)	**Ondrusek** (3–3)		42,973	61–64	
126	August 19	@ Cardinals	FSO	**L** 4–5	Neshek (6-0)	**Hoover** (1-10)		42,573	61–65	
127	August 20	@ Cardinals	FSO	**L** 2–7	Lynn (14-8)	**Cueto** (15–7)	Rosenthal (37)	43,085	61–66	
128	August 21	Braves	FSO	**L** 0–8	Teherán (14-8)	**Holmberg** (0–1)		20,243	61–67	
129	August 22	Braves	FSO	**L** 1–3 (12)	Hale (4–4)	**Parra** (0–1)	Kimbrel (38)	31,160	61–68	
130	August 23	Braves	FS1	**W** 1–0	**Leake** (10–11)	Santana (13–7)	**Chapman** (27)	41,502	62–68	
131	August 24	Braves	FSO	**W** 5–3	**Simón** (13–8)	Harang (10–8)	**Broxton** (7)	29,642	63–68	
132	August 26	Cubs	FSO	**L** 0–3	Wood (8–11)	**Cueto** (15–8)	Rondón (22)	19,481	63–69	
133	August 27	Cubs	FSO	**W** 7–5	**Latos** (5–3)	Turner (4–8)	**Chapman** (28)	20,497	64–69	
134	August 28	Cubs		**W** 7–2	**Axelrod** (5–3)	Arrieta (4–8)		21,316	65–69	
135	August 29	@ Pirates	FSO	**L** 1–2	Watson (10–1)	**Broxton** (4–2)	Melancon (25)	37,209	65–70	
136	August 30	@ Pirates	FSO/FS1	**L** 2–3	Worley (6–4)	**Simón** (13–9)	Melancon (26)	38,023	65–71	
137	August 31	@ Pirates	FSO	**W** 3–2	**Cueto** (16–8)	Hughes (6–5)	**Chapman** (29)	37,591	66–71	

September (10–15)

#	Date	TV	Opponent	Score	Win	Loss	Save	Attendance	Record	Box
138	September 2	@ Orioles	FSO	**L** 4-5	Norris (12–8)	**Latos** (5–4)	Britton (32)	15,021	66–72	
139	September 3	@ Orioles	FSO	**L** 0–6	González (8–7)	**Axelrod** (1–1)		20,246	66–73	
140	September 4	@ Orioles	FSO	**L** 7–9	Hunter (3–2)	**Parra** (0–2)	Britton (33)	21,114	66-74	
141	September 5	Mets	FSO	**L** 5–14	Colón (13–11)	**Simón** (13–10)		29,089	66-75	
142	September 6	Mets	FSO	**W** 2–1	**Cueto** (17–8)	Gee (13–10)	**Chapman** (30)	33,672	67-75	
143	September 7	Mets		**L** 3–4	Wheeler (10–9)	**Latos** (5–5)	Mejía (24)	31,444	67-76	
144	September 8	Cardinals	FSO	**L** 0–5	Miller (9–9)	**Parra** (0–3)		27,612	67-77	
145	September 9	Cardinals	FSO	**W** 9–5	**Leake** (10–11)	Wacha (5–6)	**Chapman** (31)	25,742	68-77	
146	September 10	Cardinals	FSO	**W** 4–2	**Simón** (14–10)	Lyons (0–4)	**Chapman** (32)	26,631	69-77	
147	September 11	Cardinals	FSO	**W** 1–0	**Cueto** (18–8)	Lynn (15–9)	**Chapman** (33)	21,688	70-77	
148	September 12	@ Brewers	FSO	**L** 3–2	Rodríguez (5–5)	**Díaz** (0–1)		31,463	70-78	
149	September 13	@ Brewers	FSO	**W** 5–1	**Holmberg** (1–1)	Gallardo (8–10)		45,205	71–78	
150	September 14	@ Brewers	FSO	**L** 2-9	Garza (8–8)	**Leake** (11–12)		41,870	71–79	
151	September 15	@ Cubs	FSO	**L** 0-1	Rondón (4–4)	**Villarreal** (0–1)		33,144	71–80	
152	September 16	@ Cubs	FSO	**L** 0–7	Arrieta (9–5)	**Cueto** (18–5)		33,812	71–81	
153	September 17	@ Cubs	FSO	**L** 1–3	Hendricks (7–2)	**Corcino** (0–1)	**Rondón** (25)	33,500	71–82	
154	September 19	@ Cardinals	FSO	**L** 1–2	Lackey (14–9)	**Holmberg** (1–2)	Maness (3)	45,074	71–83	
155	September 20	@ Cardinals	FS1	**L** 4–8	Motte (1–0)	**Leake** (11–13)		46,157	71–84	
156	September 21	@ Cardinals	ESPN	**W** 7-2	**Simón** (15-10)	Lynn (15-10)		45,747	72–84	
157	September 23	Brewers	FSO	**W** 3-1	**Cueto** (19–9)	Fiers (6–4)	**Chapman** (34)	27,307	73–84	
158	September 24	Brewers	FSO	**L** 0-5	Lohse (13–9)	**Corcino** (0–2)		27,307	73–85	
159	September 25	Brewers		**W** 3–5	**Holmberg** (2–2)	Gallardo (8–11)	**Chapman** (35)	25,824	74–85	
160	September 26	Pirates	FSO	**L** 1–3	Hughes (7–5)	**Villarreal** (0–2)	Melancon (33)	35,611	74–86	
161	September 27	Pirates	FS1	**W** 10–6 (10)	**Axelrod** (2–1)	Axford (2–4)		35,268	75–86	
162	September 28	Pirates	FSO	**W** 4–1	**Cueto** (20–9)	Watson (10–2)	**Chapman** (36)	34,424	76–86	

Legend
= Win
= Loss
= Postponement
**Bold** = Reds team member

== Roster ==
2014 Cincinnati Reds
Roster
Pitchers: 40 Dylan Axelrod; 34 Homer Bailey; 62 Trevor Bell; 51 Jonathan Broxton; 54 Aroldis Chapman; 58 Nick Christiani; 52 Tony Cingrani; 53 Carlos Contreras; 64 Daniel Corcino; 47 Johnny Cueto; 41 Ryan Dennick; 70 Jumbo Díaz; 26 Jeff Francis; 36 David Holmberg; 60 J. J. Hoover; 55 Mat Latos; 44 Mike Leake; 63 Sam LeCure; 45 Sean Marshall; 66 Logan Ondrusek; 43 Manny Parra; 46 Curtis Partch; 31 Alfredo Simón; 62 Pedro Villarreal	Catchers: 16 Tucker Barnhart; 39 Devin Mesoraco; 29 Brayan Peña; Infielders: 2 Zack Cozart; 15 Jake Elmore; 21 Todd Frazier; 9 Jack Hannahan; 23 Donald Lutz; 17 Kristopher Negron; 4 Brandon Phillips; 7 Ramón Santiago; 50 Neftalí Soto; 19 Joey Votto	Outfielders: 15 Roger Bernadina; 30 Jason Bourgeois; 32 Jay Bruce; 6 Billy Hamilton; 28 Chris Heisey; 48 Ryan Ludwick; 33 Yorman Rodríguez; 25 Skip Schumaker	Manager: 38 Bryan Price; Coaches: 75 Nilson Antigua (bullpen catcher); 49 Jay Bell (bench); 88 Freddie Benavides (infield); 22 Billy Hatcher (first base); 57 Mack Jenkins (bullpen); 59 Don Long (hitting); 56 Jeff Pico (pitching); 35 Steve Smith (third base); 72 Mike Stefanski (catching); 61 Lee Tinsley (assistant hitting)

=== Opening day lineup ===
- C – Brayan Peña
- P – Johnny Cueto
- 1B – Joey Votto
- 2B – Brandon Phillips
- 3B – Todd Frazier
- SS – Zack Cozart
- LF – Ryan Ludwick
- CF – Billy Hamilton
- RF – Jay Bruce

== Player statistics ==
as of September 28, 2014. Both tables are sortable.

=== Batting ===
Note: G = Games played; AB = At bats; R = Runs scored; H = Hits; 2B = Doubles; 3B = Triples; HR = Home runs; RBI = Runs batted in; AVG = Batting average; SB = Stolen bases

Player	G	AB	R	H	2B	3B	HR	RBI	AVG	SB
Dylan Axelrod	5	4	0	0	0	0	0	0	.000	0
Homer Bailey	23	41	3	6	0	0	0	3	.185	0
Tucker Barnhart	21	54	3	10	0	0	1	1	.185	0
Roger Bernadina	44	59	3	9	3	0	0	5	.153	2
Jason Bourgeois	18	33	5	8	0	1	0	1	.242	0
Jay Bruce	137	493	71	107	21	1	18	66	.217	12
Nick Christiani	10	1	0	0	0	0	0	0	.000	0
Tony Cingrani	13	21	0	3	0	0	0	0	.143	0
Carlos Contreras	17	1	0	0	0	0	0	0	.000	0
Daniel Corcino	5	3	0	1	0	0	0	0	.333	0
Zack Cozart	147	506	48	112	18	5	4	38	.221	7
Johnny Cueto	34	68	3	9	0	0	0	3	.132	0
Jake Elmore	5	11	0	2	0	0	0	0	.182	0
Jeff Francis	1	1	0	0	0	0	0	0	.000	0
Todd Frazier	157	597	88	163	22	1	29	80	.273	20
Billy Hamilton	152	563	72	141	25	8	6	48	.250	56
Jack Hannahan	26	48	3	9	3	0	0	2	.188	0
Chris Heisey	119	275	34	61	15	2	8	22	.222	9
David Holmberg	7	5	0	0	0	0	0	0	.000	0
J. J. Hoover	50	0	1	0	0	0	0	0	----	0
Mat Latos	16	30	2	3	0	0	0	1	.100	0
Mike Leake	40	68	9	12	5	0	2	5	.176	0
Ryan Ludwick	112	357	28	87	20	0	9	45	.244	0
Donald Lutz	28	51	2	9	4	0	0	1	.176	0
Devin Mesoraco	114	384	54	103	25	0	25	80	.273	1
Kristopher Negron	49	144	19	39	10	1	6	17	.271	5
Logan Ondrusek	40	3	0	0	0	0	0	0	.000	0
Brayan Peña	115	348	23	88	18	1	5	26	.253	2
Brandon Phillips	121	462	44	123	25	0	8	51	.266	2
Yorman Rodríguez	11	27	3	6	0	0	0	2	.222	0
Ramón Santiago	75	179	20	44	8	0	2	17	.246	2
Skip Schumaker	83	247	22	58	12	0	2	22	.235	2
Alfredo Simón	32	59	2	7	3	0	0	2	.119	0
Neftali Soto	21	30	1	3	1	0	0	1	.100	1
Pedro Villarreal	12	2	0	1	0	0	0	0	.500	0
Joey Votto	62	220	32	56	16	0	6	23	.255	1
Team totals	162	5395	595	1282	254	20	131	562	.238	122

Complete batting stats can be found here

=== Pitching ===
Note: W = Wins; L = Losses; ERA = Earned run average; G = Games pitched; GS = Games started; SV = Saves; IP = Innings pitched; H = Hits allowed; ER = Earned runs allowed; BB = Walks allowed; K = Strikeouts

Player	W	L	ERA	G	GS	SV	IP	H	ER	BB	K
Dylan Axelrod	2	1	2.95	5	4	0	18.1	14	6	4	20
Homer Bailey	9	5	3.71	23	23	0	145.2	134	60	45	124
Trevor Bell	0	0	67.50	2	0	0	0.2	5	5	2	0
Jonathan Broxton	4	2	1.86	51	0	7	48.1	32	10	17	37
Aroldis Chapman	0	3	2.00	54	0	36	54.0	21	12	24	106
Nick Christiani	0	1	5.54	10	0	0	13.0	12	8	6	8
Tony Cingrani	2	8	4.55	13	11	0	63.1	62	32	35	61
Carlos Contreras	0	1	6.52	17	0	0	19.1	19	14	17	19
Daniel Corcino	0	2	4.34	5	3	0	18.2	13	9	10	15
Johnny Cueto	20	9	2.25	34	34	0	243.2	169	61	65	242
Ryan Dennick	0	0	11.57	8	0	0	4.2	7	6	4	3
Jumbo Díaz	0	1	3.38	36	0	0	34.2	29	13	14	37
Jeff Francis	0	1	5.40	1	1	0	5.0	5	3	0	4
David Holmberg	2	2	4.80	7	5	0	30.0	27	16	16	18
JJ Hoover	1	10	4.88	54	0	0	62.2	56	34	31	75
Mat Latos	5	5	3.25	16	16	0	102.1	92	37	26	74
Mike Leake	11	13	3.70	33	33	0	214.1	217	88	50	164
Sam LeCure	1	4	3.81	62	0	0	56.2	62	24	24	48
Sean Marshall	0	0	7.71	15	0	0	14.0	23	12	12	14
Logan Ondrusek	3	3	5.49	40	0	0	41.0	50	25	16	42
Manny Parra	0	3	4.66	53	0	1	36.2	39	19	18	34
Curtis Partch	1	0	0.00	6	0	0	7.0	2	0	7	6
Skip Schumaker	0	0	0.00	83	0	0	1.0	0	0	1	0
Alfredo Simón	15	10	3.44	32	32	0	196.1	176	75	56	127
Pedro Villarreal	0	2	4.30	12	0	0	14.2	11	7	7	12
Team totals	76	86	3.59	162	162	44	1446.0	1282	576	507	1290

Complete pitching stats can be found here

== Farm system ==
Level	Team	League	Manager
AAA	Louisville Bats	International League	Jim Riggleman
AA	Pensacola Blue Wahoos	Southern League	Delino DeShields
High A	Bakersfield Blaze	California League	Pat Kelly
A	Dayton Dragons	Midwest League	José Nieves
Rookie
Rookie	Billings Mustangs	Pioneer League	Dick Schofield
Rookie	AZL Reds	Arizona League	Eli Marrero
Rookie	DSL Reds	Dominican Summer League	Luis Saturria
Rookie	DSL Rojos	Dominican Summer League	José Castro

Minor League Baseball standings
LEAGUE CHAMPIONS: Billings
