= 2014 Milwaukee Brewers season =

2014 Milwaukee Brewers
- League: National League
- Division: Central
- Ballpark: Miller Park
- City: Milwaukee, Wisconsin
- Record: 82–80 (.506)
- Divisional place: 3rd
- Owners: Mark Attanasio
- General managers: Doug Melvin
- Managers: Ron Roenicke
- Television: Fox Sports Wisconsin (Brian Anderson, Bill Schroeder, Craig Coshun, Matt Lepay, Telly Hughes, Jeff Grayson, Sophia Minnaert); WYTU-LD (Spanish-language coverage, Sunday home games; Hector Molina, Kevin Holden)
- Radio: 620 WTMJ (Bob Uecker, Joe Block, Craig Counsell, Darryl Hamilton); 1510 ESPN Deportes (Spanish-language coverage, select daytime games; Andy Olivares)
- Stats: ESPN.com; Baseball Reference

The 2014 Milwaukee Brewers season was the 45th season for the Brewers in Milwaukee, the 17th in the National League, and 46th overall. After leading the National League Central for much of the season, the Brewers collapsed in the second half and missed the playoffs. They finished 82–80, finishing in third place.

== Regular season ==
=== Season standings ===
==== National League Central ====
NL Central
Team	W	L	Pct.	GB	Home	Road
St. Louis Cardinals	90	72	.556	—	51‍–‍30	39‍–‍42
Pittsburgh Pirates	88	74	.543	2	51‍–‍30	37‍–‍44
Milwaukee Brewers	82	80	.506	8	42‍–‍39	40‍–‍41
Cincinnati Reds	76	86	.469	14	44‍–‍37	32‍–‍49
Chicago Cubs	73	89	.451	17	41‍–‍40	32‍–‍49

==== National League Wild Card ====
Division leaders
Team	W	L	Pct.
Washington Nationals	96	66	.593
Los Angeles Dodgers	94	68	.580
St. Louis Cardinals	90	72	.556

Wild Card teams (Top 2 teams qualify for postseason)
Team	W	L	Pct.	GB
Pittsburgh Pirates	88	74	.543	—
San Francisco Giants	88	74	.543	—
Milwaukee Brewers	82	80	.506	6
New York Mets	79	83	.488	9
Atlanta Braves	79	83	.488	9
Miami Marlins	77	85	.475	11
San Diego Padres	77	85	.475	11
Cincinnati Reds	76	86	.469	12
Philadelphia Phillies	73	89	.451	15
Chicago Cubs	73	89	.451	15
Colorado Rockies	66	96	.407	22
Arizona Diamondbacks	64	98	.395	24

=== Record vs. opponents ===
2014 National League record Source: MLB Standings Grid – 2014
Team	AZ	ATL	CHC	CIN	COL	LAD	MIA	MIL	NYM	PHI	PIT	SD	SF	STL	WSH	AL
Arizona	–	3–3	5–2	3–4	9–10	4–15	3–4	3–4	2–4	2–4	3–4	12–7	6–13	1–5	1–6	7–13
Atlanta	3–3	–	5–1	5–2	4–3	1–6	9–10	5–2	9–10	11–8	3–4	3–4	1–5	2–4	11–8	7–13
Chicago	2–5	1–5	–	8–11	5–2	3–4	4–2	11–8	5–2	3–3	5–14	3–4	2–4	9–10	3–4	9–11
Cincinnati	4–3	2–5	11–8	–	3–4	3–4	4–3	10–9	2–4	3–3	12–7	1–5	5–2	7–12	3–3	6–14
Colorado	10–9	3–4	2–5	4–3	–	6–13	3–4	1–6	3–4	3–3	2–4	10–9	10–9	1–5	1–5	7–13
Los Angeles	15–4	6–1	4–3	4–3	13–6	–	3–3	1–5	4–2	3–4	2–5	12–7	10–9	4–3	2–4	11–9
Miami	4–3	10–9	2–4	3–4	4–3	3–3	–	3–4	8–11	9–10	2–4	3–4	3–4	4–2	6–13	13–7
Milwaukee	4–3	2–5	8–11	9–10	6–1	5–1	4–3	–	4–3	3–4	12–7	3–3	2–4	7–12	2–4	11–9
New York	4–2	10–9	2–5	4–2	4–3	2–4	11–8	3–4	–	13–6	3–4	3–3	1–6	4–3	4–15	11–9
Philadelphia	4–2	8–11	3–3	3–3	3–3	4–3	10–9	4–3	6–13	–	1–6	4–3	2–5	4–3	10–9	7–13
Pittsburgh	4–3	4–3	14–5	7–12	4–2	5–2	4–2	7–12	4–3	6–1	–	3–3	4–2	8–11	3–4	11–9
San Diego	7–12	4–3	4–3	5–1	9–10	7–12	4–3	3–3	3–3	3–4	3–3	–	10–9	3–4	3–4	9–11
San Francisco	13–6	5–1	4–2	2–5	9–10	9–10	4–3	4–2	6–1	5–2	2–4	9–10	–	4–3	2–5	10–10
St. Louis	5–1	4–2	10–9	12–7	5–1	3–4	2–4	12–7	3–4	3–4	11–8	4–3	3–4	–	5–2	8–12
Washington	6–1	8–11	4–3	3–3	5–1	4–2	13–6	4–2	15–4	9–10	4–3	4–3	5–2	2–5	–	10–10

=== Game log ===
2014 game log
March & April (20–8) – home (9–6) – road (11–2)

#	Date	Opponent	Score	Win	Loss	Save	Attendance	Record
1	March 31	Braves	2–0	**Gallardo** (1–0)	Teherán (0–1)	**Rodríguez** (1)	45,691	1–0
2	April 1	Braves	2–5	Wood (1–0)	**Lohse** (0–1)	Kimbrel (1)	21,503	1–1
3	April 2	Braves	0–1	Harang (1–0)	**Garza** (0–1)	Kimbrel (2)	21,712	1–2
4	April 4	@ Red Sox	6–2	**Kintzler** (1–0)	Mujica (0–1)		36,728	2–2
5	April 5	@ Red Sox	7–6 (11)	**Thornburg** (1–0)	Badenhop (0–1)	**Rodríguez** (2)	35,729	3–2
6	April 6	@ Red Sox	4–0	**Gallardo** (2–0)	Lester (0–2)		35,958	4–2
–	April 7	@ Phillies	2:05pm	PPD, RAIN; rescheduled for April 8				
7	April 8	@ Phillies	10–4	**Lohse** (1–1)	Kendrick (0–1)		45,061	5–2
8	April 9	@ Phillies	9–4	**Thornburg** (2–0)	Bastardo (0–1)		31,168	6–2
9	April 10	@ Phillies	6–2	**Estrada** (1–0)	Lee (2–1)		25,492	7–2
10	April 11	Pirates	4–2	**Peralta** (1–0)	Liriano (0–2)	**Rodríguez** (3)	27,469	8–2
11	April 12	Pirates	3–2	**Henderson** (1–0)	Melancon (0–1)	**Rodríguez** (4)	42,828	9–2
12	April 13	Pirates	4–1	**Lohse** (2–1)	Morton (0–1)	**Smith** (1)	32,152	10-2
13	April 14	Cardinals	0–4	Lynn (3–0)	**Garza** (0–2)		27,090	10–3
14	April 15	Cardinals	1–6	Miller (1–2)	**Estrada** (1–1)		27,470	10–4
15	April 16	Cardinals	5–1	**Peralta** (2–0)	Kelly (1–1)		26,668	11–4
16	April 17	@ Pirates	2–11	Vólquez (1–0)	**Wooten** (0–1)		17,584	11–5
17	April 18	@ Pirates	5–3	**Lohse** (3–1)	Morton (0–2)	**Rodríguez** (5)	31,564	12–5
18	April 19	@ Pirates	8–7	**Henderson** (2–0)	Grilli (0–1)	**Rodríguez** (6)	32,490	13–5
19	April 20	@ Pirates	3–2 (14)	**Duke** (1–0)	Gómez (0–1)	**Rodríguez** (7)	21,761	14–5
20	April 21	Padres	4–3	**Peralta** (3–0)	Cashner (2–2)	**Rodríguez** (8)	25,408	15–5
21	April 22	Padres	1–2 (12)	Roach (1–0)	**Fígaro** (0–1)	Street (7)	25,815	15–6
22	April 23	Padres	5–2	**Lohse** (2–3)	Ross (4–1)	**Rodríguez** (9)	28,095	16–6
23	April 25	Cubs	5–2	**Garza** (1–2)	Villanueva (1–5)	**Rodríguez** (10)	32,868	17–6
24	April 26	Cubs	5–3	**Estrada** (2–1)	Wood (1–3)	**Rodríguez** (11)	40,008	18–6
25	April 27	Cubs	0–4	Hammel (4–1)	**Peralta** (3–1)		45,286	18–7
26	April 28	@ Cardinals	5–3 (12)	**Duke** (2–0)	Maness (0–2)	**Rodríguez** (12)	40,514	19–7
27	April 29	@ Cardinals	5–4 (11)	**Thornburg** (3–0)	Siegrist (0–1)	**Rodríguez** (13)	40,531	20–7
28	April 30	@ Cardinals	3–9	Miller (3–2)	**Garza** (1–3)		40,783	20–8

May (13–15) – home (8–6) – road (5–9)

#	Date	Opponent	Score	Win	Loss	Save	Attendance	Record
29	May 1	@ Reds	3–8	Bailey (2–2)	**Henderson** (2–1)		16,779	20–9
30	May 2	@ Reds	2–0	**Peralta** (4–1)	Leake (2–3)	**Rodríguez** (14)	32,759	21–9
31	May 3	@ Reds	2–6	Cueto (3–2)	**Gallardo** (2–1)		38,243	21–10
32	May 4	@ Reds	3–4 (10)	LeCure (1–1)	**Thornburg** (3–1)		32,953	21–11
33	May 5	Diamondbacks	8–3	**Garza** (2–3)	Bolsinger (1–2)		27,220	22–11
34	May 6	Diamondbacks	5–7	Marshall (1–0)	**Kintzler** (1–1)	Reed (9)	27,497	22–12
35	May 7	Diamondbacks	2–3	Arroyo (3–2)	**Peralta** (4–2)	Reed (10)	24,013	22–13
36	May 9	Yankees	3–5	Tanaka (5–0)	**Gallardo** (2–2)	Robertson (6)	40,123	22–14
37	May 10	Yankees	5–4	**Duke** (3–0)	Aceves (0–1)	**Rodríguez** (15)	43,085	23–14
38	May 11	Yankees	6–5	**Rodríguez** (1–0)	Warren (1–2)		43,544	24–14
39	May 13	Pirates	5–2	**Estrada** (3–1)	Cole (3–3)	**Rodríguez** (16)	24,176	25–14
40	May 14	Pirates	1–4	Watson (4–0)	**Rodríguez** (1–1)	Melancon (5)	24,962	25–15
41	May 15	Pirates	4–3	**Wooten** (1–1)	Melancon (1–2)		34,743	26–15
42	May 16	@ Cubs	4–3	**Lohse** (5–1)	Samardzija (0–4)	**Rodríguez** (17)	35,771	27–15
43	May 17	@ Cubs	0–3	Jackson (3–3)	**Garza** (2–4)	Rondón (4)	36,671	27–16
44	May 18	@ Cubs	2–4	Wood (4–4)	**Estrada** (3–2)	Rondón (5)	37,631	27–17
45	May 19	@ Braves	3–9	Minor (2–2)	**Peralta** (4–3)		20,468	27–18
46	May 20	@ Braves	0–5	Teherán (3–3)	**Gallardo** (2–3)		20,045	27–19
47	May 21	@ Braves	6–1	**Lohse** (6–1)	Santana (4–2)		18,148	28–19
48	May 22	@ Braves	4–5	Wood (4–5)	**Kintzler** (1–2)	Kimbrel (12)	30,148	28–20
49	May 23	@ Marlins	9–5	**Estrada** (4–2)	Koehler (4–4)		18,989	29–20
50	May 24	@ Marlins	1–2	Turner (1–2)	**Peralta** (4–4)	Cishek (10)	25,819	29–21
51	May 25	@ Marlins	7–1	**Nelson** (1–0)	Wolf (0–1)		21,897	30–21
52	May 26	Orioles	6–7 (10)	O'Day (2–0)	**Wooten** (1–2)	Britton (3)	42,889	30–22
53	May 27	Orioles	7–6 (10)	**Rodríguez** (2–1)	McFarland (0–1)		25,552	31–22
54	May 28	Orioles	8–3	**Gallardo** (3–3)	Norris (3–5)		28,280	32–22
55	May 30	Cubs	11–5	**Estrada** (5–2)	Wood (5–5)		36,100	33–22
56	May 31	Cubs	0–8	Hammel (6–3)	**Peralta** (4–5)		42,332	33–23

June (18–10) – home (7–6) – road (11–4)

#	Date	Opponent	Score	Win	Loss	Save	Attendance	Record
57	June 1	Cubs	9–0	**Lohse** (7–1)	Samardzija (1–5)		36,277	34–23
58	June 2	Twins	6–2	**Garza** (3–4)	Gibson (4–5)		28,708	35–23
59	June 3	Twins	4–6	Deduno (2–3)	**Gallardo** (3–4)	Perkins (15)	25,634	35–24
60	June 4	@ Twins	4–6	Nolasco (4–5)	**Wooten** (1–3)	Perkins (16)	31,144	35–25
61	June 5	@ Twins	8–5	**Peralta** (5–5)	Correia (2–7)	**Rodríguez** (18)	35,110	36–25
62	June 6	@ Pirates	5–15	Cumpton (1–2)	**Lohse** (7–2)		35,544	36–26
63	June 7	@ Pirates	9–3	**Garza** (4–4)	Vólquez (3–5)		38,525	37–26
64	June 8	@ Pirates	1–0	**Gallardo** (4–4)	Locke (0–1)	**Rodríguez** (19)	35,002	38–26
65	June 10	@ Mets	2–6	Matsuzaka (3–0)	**Estrada** (5–3)		20,206	38–27
66	June 11	@ Mets	3–1	**Peralta** (6–5)	deGrom (0–3)	**Rodríguez** (20)	20,170	39–27
67	June 12	@ Mets	5–1 (13)	**Duke** (4–0)	Torres (2–4)		22,155	40–27
68	June 13	Reds	5–6	Broxton (2–0)	**Rodríguez** (2–2)	Chapman (11)	38,330	40–28
69	June 14	Reds	4–2	**Smith** (1–0)	Hoover (1–5)	**Rodríguez** (21)	40,507	41–28
70	June 15	Reds	4–13	Leake (4–6)	**Estrada** (5–4)		42,213	41–29
71	June 16	@ Diamondbacks	9–3	**Peralta** (7–5)	Harris (0–2)		18,262	42–29
72	June 17	@ Diamondbacks	7–5	**Lohse** (8–2)	Marshall (2–2)	**Rodríguez** (22)	18,148	43–29
73	June 18	@ Diamondbacks	3–4	Ziegler (3–1)	**Kintzler** (1–3)		19,711	43–30
74	June 19	@ Diamondbacks	4–1	**Gallardo** (5–4)	Anderson (5–2)	**Rodríguez** (23)	22,559	44–30
75	June 20	@ Rockies	13–10	**Estrada** (6–4)	Bergman (0–2)	**Rodríguez** (24)	41,238	45–30
76	June 21	@ Rockies	9–4	**Peralta** (8–5)	Friedrich (0–1)		38,020	46–30
77	June 22	@ Rockies	6–5	**Lohse** (9–2)	Matzek (1–2)	**Rodríguez** (25)	36,619	47–30
78	June 23	Nationals	0–3	Gonzalez (4–4)	**Garza** (4–5)	Clippard (1)	31,102	47–31
79	June 24	Nationals	2–4 (16)	Clippard (5–2)	**Fiers** (0–1)	Soriano (18)	30,149	47–32
80	June 25	Nationals	9–2	**Estrada** (7–4)	Strasburg (6–6)		39,049	48–32
81	June 26	Rockies	7–4	**Peralta** (9–5)	Friedrich (0–2)	**Rodríguez** (26)	27,056	49–32
82	June 27	Rockies	3–2	**Rodríguez** (3–2)	Belisle (2–3)		34,132	50–32
83	June 28	Rockies	7–4	**Garza** (5–5)	Chacín (1–7)	**Rodríguez** (27)	40,816	51–32
84	June 29	Rockies	4–10	de la Rosa (8–6)	**Gallardo** (5–5)		43,656	51–33

July (9–16) – home (6–8) – road (3–8)

#	Date	Opponent	Score	Win	Loss	Save	Attendance	Record
85	July 1	@ Blue Jays	1–4	Hutchison (6–6)	**Estrada** (7–5)	Janssen (13)	45,088	51–34
86	July 2	@ Blue Jays	4–7	Janssen (3–0)	**Smith** (1–1)		24,286	51–35
87	July 4	@ Reds	2–4	Simón (11–3)	**Lohse** (9–3)	Chapman (17)	42,120	51–36
88	July 5	@ Reds	1–0	**Garza** (6–5)	Bailey (8–5)		38,754	52–36
89	July 6	@ Reds	2–4	Latos (2–1)	**Smith** (1–2)	Broxton (6)	27,923	52–37
90	July 7	Phillies	2–3	Hamels (3–5)	**Estrada** (7–6)	Papelbon (20)	28,080	52–38
91	July 8	Phillies	7–9	Kendrick (4–8)	**Peralta** (9–6)	Papelbon (21)	26,126	52–39
92	July 9	Phillies	1–4	Hernández (4–8)	**Lohse** (9–4)	Papelbon (22)	26,480	52–40
93	July 10	Phillies	1–9	Buchanan (5–5)	**Garza** (6–6)		36,394	52–41
94	July 11	Cardinals	6–7	Neshek (4–0)	**Rodríguez** (3–3)	Rosenthal (28)	35,501	52–42
95	July 12	Cardinals	2–10	Wainwright (12–4)	**Nelson** (1–1)		40,198	52–43
96	July 13	Cardinals	11–2	**Peralta** (10–6)	Martinez (2–4)		35,345	53–43
97	July 18	@ Nationals	4–2	**Lohse** (10–4)	Strasburg (7–7)	**Rodríguez** (28)	39,373	54–43
98	July 19	@ Nationals	3–8	Roark (9–6)	**Garza** (6–7)		38,649	54–44
99	July 20	@ Nationals	4–5	Soriano (2–0)	**Wooten** (1–4)		36,373	54–45
100	July 21	Reds	5–2	**Peralta** (11–6)	Latos (2–2)	**Rodríguez** (29)	31,350	55–45
101	July 22	Reds	4–3	**Rodríguez** (4–3)	LeCure (1–2)		33,485	56–45
102	July 23	Reds	5–1	**Lohse** (11–4)	Leake (7–9)		38,192	57–45
103	July 24	Mets	9–1	**Garza** (7–7)	Gee (4–3)		29,755	58–45
104	July 25	Mets	2–3	Torres (5–4)	**Rodríguez** (4–4)	Mejía (14)	33,097	58–46
105	July 26	Mets	5–2	**Peralta** (12–6)	Niese (5–6)	**Rodríguez** (30)	39,292	59–46
106	July 27	Mets	0–2	deGrom (5–5)	**Nelson** (1–2)	Mejía (15)	39,040	59–47
107	July 28	@ Rays	1–2	Odorizzi (7–8)	**Lohse** (11–5)	McGee (12)	12,660	59–48
108	July 29	@ Rays	1–5	Cobb (7–6)	**Smith** (1–3)		16,249	59–49
109	July 30	@ Rays	5–0	**Gallardo** (6–5)	Price (11–8)	**Rodríguez** (31)	24,809	60–49

August (13–14) – home (6–5) – road (7–9)

#	Date	Opponent	Score	Win	Loss	Save	Attendance	Record
110	August 1	@ Cardinals	7–4	**Peralta** (13–6)	Wainwright (13–6)	**Rodríguez** (32)	45,306	61–49
111	August 2	@ Cardinals	7–9	Masterson (5–6)	**Lohse** (11–6)	Rosenthal (33)	45,719	61–50
112	August 3	@ Cardinals	2–3	Lackey (12–7)	**Jeffress** (0–1)	Rosenthal (34)	44,662	61–51
113	August 5	Giants	4–3	**Nelson** (2–2)	Machi (6–1)	**Rodríguez** (33)	40,465	62–51
114	August 6	Giants	4–7	Vogelsong (7–8)	**Gallardo** (6–6)		33,394	62–52
115	August 7	Giants	3–1	**Peralta** (14–6)	Peavy (1–12)	**Rodríguez** (34)	38,229	63–52
116	August 8	Dodgers	9–3	**Jeffress** (1–1)	League (2–3)		37,434	64–52
117	August 9	Dodgers	4–1	**Fiers** (1–1)	Greinke (12–8)	**Rodríguez** (35)	40,553	65–52
118	August 10	Dodgers	1–5	Kershaw (14–2)	**Nelson** (2–3)		43,612	65–53
119	August 11	@ Cubs	3–1	**Gallardo** (7–6)	Arrieta (6–4)	**Rodríguez** (36)	28,927	66–53
120	August 12	@ Cubs	0–3	Hendricks (4–1)	**Peralta** (14–7)	Rondón (15)	28,819	66–54
121	August 13	@ Cubs	2–4	Wada (2–1)	**Lohse** (11–7)	Rondón (16)	31,191	66–55
122	August 14	@ Cubs	6–2	**Fiers** (2–1)	Jackson (6–13)		38,157	67–55
123	August 15	@ Dodgers	6–3	**Kintzler** (2–3)	Wright (4–3)	**Rodríguez** (37)	47,272	68–55
124	August 16	@ Dodgers	3–2	**Gallardo** (8–6)	Kershaw (14–3)	**Rodríguez** (38)	50,849	69–55
125	August 17	@ Dodgers	7–2	**Peralta** (15–7)	Haren (10–10)		43,357	70–55
126	August 19	Blue Jays	6–1	**Fiers** (3–1)	Happ (8–8)		42,221	71–55
127	August 20	Blue Jays	5–9	Dickey (10–12)	**Nelson** (2–4)		39,300	71–56
128	August 22	Pirates	3–8	Locke (5–3)	**Gallardo** (8–7)		37,437	71–57
129	August 23	Pirates	2–10	Vólquez (11–7)	**Peralta** (15–8)		40,557	71–58
130	August 24	Pirates	4–3	**Fiers** (4–1)	Worley (5–4)	**Rodríguez** (39)	42,761	72–58
131	August 25	@ Padres	10–1	**Lohse** (12–7)	Stults (6–14)		24,968	73–58
132	August 26	@ Padres	1–4	Ross (12–12)	**Nelson** (2–5)	Benoit (9)	21,786	73–59
133	August 27	@ Padres	2–3 (10)	Thayer (4–3)	**Duke** (4–1)		21,156	73–60
134	August 29	@ Giants	2–13	Vogelsong (8–9)	**Peralta** (15–9)		41,348	73–61
135	August 30	@ Giants	1–3	Peavy (4–13)	**Fiers** (4–2)	Casilla (13)	41,397	73–62
136	August 31	@ Giants	5–15	Bumgarner (16–9)	**Lohse** (12–8)		41,935	73–63

September (9–17) – home (6–8) – road (3–9)

#	Date	Opponent	Score	Win	Loss	Save	Attendance	Record
137	September 1	@ Cubs	2–4	Turner (5–8)	**Nelson** (2–6)	Rondón (23)	32,054	73–64
138	September 2	@ Cubs	1–7	Arrieta (8–5)	**Gallardo** (8–8)		28,434	73–65
139	September 3	@ Cubs	2–6	Hendricks (6–1)	**Garza** (7–8)		31,251	73–66
140	September 4	Cardinals	2–3	Gonzales (2–2)	**Peralta** (15–10)	Rosenthal (42)	37,227	73–67
141	September 5	Cardinals	6–2	**Fiers** (5–2)	Lackey (13–9)		35,103	74–67
142	September 6	Cardinals	3–5	Lynn (15–8)	**Lohse** (12–9)	Rosenthal (43)	39,042	74–68
143	September 7	Cardinals	1–9	Wainwright (17–9)	**Nelson** (2–7)		31,771	74–69
144	September 8	Marlins	4–6	Penny (2–1)	**Gallardo** (8–9)	Cishek (33)	31,203	74–70
145	September 9	Marlins	3–6	Morris (8–1)	**Rodríguez** (4–5)	Cishek (34)	29,590	74–71
146	September 10	Marlins	4–1	**Peralta** (16–10)	Cosart (13–9)	**Rodríguez** (40)	25,219	75–71
147	September 11	Marlins	4–2	**Fiers** (6–2)	Eovaldi (6–11)	**Rodríguez** (41)	34,028	76–71
148	September 12	Reds	3–2	**Rodríguez** (5–5)	Díaz (0–1)		31,463	77–71
149	September 13	Reds	1–5	Holmberg (1–1)	**Gallardo** (8–10)		45,205	77–72
150	September 14	Reds	9–2	**Garza** (8–8)	Leake (11–12)		41,870	78–72
151	September 16	@ Cardinals	3–2 (12)	**Kintzler** (3–3)	Siegrist (1–4)	**Rodríguez** (42)	44,529	79–72
152	September 17	@ Cardinals	0–2	Wainwright (19–9)	**Fiers** (6–3)		44,480	79–73
153	September 18	@ Cardinals	2–3 (13)	Freeman (2–0)	**Nelson** (2–8)		44,823	79–74
154	September 19	@ Pirates	2–4	Holdzkom (1–0)	**Broxton** (4–3)	Melancon (31)	37,974	79–75
155	September 20	@ Pirates	1–0	**Duke** (5–1)	Melancon (3–5)	**Rodríguez** (43)	39,027	80–75
156	September 21	@ Pirates	0–1	Worley (8–4)	**Peralta** (16–11)	Watson (1)	38,650	80–76
157	September 23	@ Reds	1–3	Cueto (19–9)	**Fiers** (6–4)	Chapman (34)	27,307	80–77
158	September 24	@ Reds	5–0	**Lohse** (13–9)	Corcino (0–2)		27,033	81–77
159	September 25	@ Reds	3–5	Holmberg (2–2)	**Gallardo** (8–11)	Chapman (35)	25,824	81–78
160	September 26	Cubs	4–6	Ramirez (3–3)	**Nelson** (2–9)	Rondón (28)	39,880	81–79
161	September 27	Cubs	2–1	**Peralta** (17–11)	Wada (4–4)	**Rodríguez** (44)	41,440	82–79
162	September 28	Cubs	2–5	Turner (6–11)	**Fiers** (6–5)	Rondón (29)	33,837	82–80

- Brewers win
- Brewers loss
- Postponement
- Bold: Brewers team member

=== Roster ===
2014 Milwaukee Brewers
**Roster**
**Pitchers**: 51 Jonathan Broxton; 59 Zach Duke; 41 Marco Estrada; 64 Mike Fiers; 50 Alfredo Fígaro; 49 Yovani Gallardo; 22 Matt Garza; 32 Tom Gorzelanny; 29 Jim Henderson; 21 Jeremy Jeffress; 53 Brandon Kintzler; 26 Kyle Lohse; 52 Jimmy Nelson; 38 Wily Peralta; 57 Francisco Rodríguez; 13 Will Smith; 30 Tyler Thornburg; 51,58 Wei-Chung Wang; 47 Rob Wooten	**Catchers**: 20 Jonathan Lucroy; 12 Martín Maldonado; 11 Matt Pagnozzi; **Infielders**: 14 Jeff Bianchi; 60 Matt Clark; 21 Irving Falú; 2 Scooter Gennett; 5 Héctor Gómez; 3 Elián Herrera; 24 Lyle Overbay; 16 Aramis Ramírez; 7 Mark Reynolds; 15 Jason Rogers; 9 Jean Segura; 23 Rickie Weeks	**Outfielders**: 8 Ryan Braun; 18 Khris Davis; 15 Caleb Gindl; 27 Carlos Gómez; 28 Gerardo Parra; 1 Logan Schafer	**Manager**: 10 Ron Roenicke; **Coaches**: 56 Joe Crawford (coach); 33 Mike Guerrero (infield); 55 Marcus Hanel (bullpen catcher); 35 Garth Iorg (first base); 39 Rick Kranitz (pitching); 36 Jerry Narron (bench); 37 Johnny Narron (hitting); 6 Ed Sedar (third base); 43 Lee Tunnell (bullpen)

== Player stats ==
=== Batting ===
Note: G = Games played; AB = At bats; R = Runs; H = Hits; 2B = Doubles; 3B = Triples; HR = Home runs; RBI = Runs batted in; SB = Stolen bases; BB = Walks; AVG = Batting average; SLG = Slugging average

Player	G	AB	R	H	2B	3B	HR	RBI	SB	BB	AVG	SLG
Jonathan Lucroy	153	585	73	176	53	2	13	69	4	66	.301	.465
Carlos Gómez	148	574	95	163	34	4	23	73	34	47	.284	.477
Ryan Braun	135	530	68	141	30	6	19	81	11	41	.266	.453
Jean Segura	146	513	61	126	14	6	5	31	20	28	.246	.326
Khris Davis	144	501	70	122	37	2	22	69	4	32	.244	.457
Aramis Ramírez	133	494	47	141	23	1	15	66	3	21	.285	.427
Scooter Gennett	137	440	55	127	31	3	9	54	6	22	.289	.434
Mark Reynolds	130	378	47	74	9	0	22	45	5	47	.196	.394
Lyle Overbay	121	258	24	60	14	0	4	35	2	36	.233	.333
Rickie Weeks Jr.	121	252	36	69	19	1	8	29	3	25	.274	.452
Elián Herrera	69	135	14	37	7	1	0	5	4	3	.274	.341
Gerardo Parra	46	123	13	33	4	1	3	10	4	8	.268	.390
Logan Schafer	65	116	13	21	9	1	0	8	2	15	.181	.276
Martín Maldonado	52	111	14	26	5	0	4	16	0	11	.234	.387
Jeff Bianchi	29	70	4	12	1	0	0	6	0	3	.171	.186
Matt Clark	16	27	4	5	0	0	3	7	0	2	.185	.519
Héctor Gómez	15	20	2	3	1	0	0	1	0	1	.150	.200
Caleb Gindl	8	19	0	3	0	0	0	0	0	4	.158	.158
Irving Falú	11	10	0	0	0	0	0	1	0	1	.000	.000
Jason Rogers	8	9	0	1	1	0	0	0	0	1	.111	.111
Matt Pagnozzi	1	0	0	0	0	0	0	0	0	0	.---	.---
Pitcher totals	162	297	10	26	5	0	0	11	0	9	.088	.104
Team totals	162	5462	650	1366	297	28	150	617	102	423	.250	.397

=== Pitching ===
Note: W = Wins; L = Losses; ERA = Earned run average; G = Games pitched; GS = Games started; SV = Saves; IP = Innings pitched; H = Hits allowed; R = Runs allowed; ER = Earned runs allowed; BB = Walks allowed; SO = Strikeouts

Player	W	L	ERA	G	GS	SV	IP	H	R	ER	BB	SO
Wily Peralta	17	11	3.53	32	32	0	198.2	198	88	78	61	154
Kyle Lohse	13	9	3.54	31	31	0	198.1	183	87	78	45	141
Yovani Gallardo	8	11	3.51	32	32	0	192.1	195	86	75	54	146
Matt Garza	8	8	3.64	27	27	0	163.1	143	77	66	50	126
Marco Estrada	7	6	4.36	39	18	0	150.2	137	77	73	44	127
Mike Fiers	6	5	2.13	14	10	0	71.2	46	19	17	17	76
Jimmy Nelson	2	9	4.93	14	12	0	69.1	82	42	38	19	57
Francisco Rodríguez	5	5	3.04	69	0	44	68.0	49	23	23	18	73
Will Smith	1	3	3.70	78	0	1	65.2	62	31	27	31	86
Zach Duke	5	1	2.45	74	0	0	58.2	49	19	16	17	74
Brandon Kintzler	3	3	3.24	64	0	0	58.1	62	22	21	16	31
Rob Wooten	1	4	4.72	40	0	0	34.1	42	18	18	8	29
Tyler Thornburg	3	1	4.25	27	0	0	29.2	24	14	14	21	28
Jeremy Jeffress	1	1	1.88	29	0	0	28.2	27	6	6	7	25
Tom Gorzelanny	0	0	0.86	23	0	0	21.0	22	3	2	8	23
Wei-Chung Wang	0	0	10.90	14	14	0	17.1	30	23	21	8	13
Jim Henderson	2	1	7.15	14	0	0	11.1	14	10	9	4	17
Jonathan Broxton	0	1	4.35	11	0	0	10.1	9	5	5	2	12
Alfredo Figaro	0	1	7.27	6	0	0	8.2	11	7	7	1	8
Martin Maldonado	0	0	0.00	1	0	0	1.0	1	0	0	0	0
Lyle Overbay	0	0	0.00	1	0	0	0.1	0	0	0	0	0
Team totals	82	80	3.67	162	162	45	1457.2	1386	657	594	431	1246

== Detailed Records ==
National League
Opponent	Home	Away	Total	Pct.	Runs scored	Runs allowed
NL East
Atlanta Braves	1–2	1–3	2–5	.286	16	26
Miami Marlins	2–2	2–1	4–3	.571	32	23
Washington Nationals	1–2	1–2	2–4	.333	22	24
New York Mets	2–2	2–1	4–3	.571	26	16
Philadelphia Phillies	0–4	3–0	3–4	.429	36	35
	6–12	9–7	15–19	.441	132	124
NL Central
Milwaukee Brewers	—	—	—	—	—	—
St. Louis Cardinals	3–7	4–5	7–12	.368	71	88
Pittsburgh Pirates	6–3	6–4	12–7	.632	66	81
Cincinnati Reds	6–3	3–7	9–10	.474	64	70
Chicago Cubs	5–4	3–7	8–11	.421	60	71
	20–17	16–23	36–40	.474	261	310
NL West
San Francisco Giants	2–1	0–3	2–4	.333	19	42
Los Angeles Dodgers	2–1	3–0	5–1	.833	30	16
Colorado Rockies	3–1	3–0	6–1	.857	49	39
San Diego Padres	2–1	1–2	3–3	.500	23	15
Arizona Diamondbacks	1–2	3–1	4–3	.571	39	26
	10–6	10–6	20–12	.625	160	138

American League
Opponent	Home	Away	Total	Pct.	Runs scored	Runs allowed
Boston Red Sox	—	3–0	3–0	1.000	17	8
New York Yankees	2–1	—	2–1	.667	14	14
Baltimore Orioles	2–1	—	2–1	.667	21	16
Minnesota Twins	1–1	1–1	2–2	.500	22	19
Toronto Blue Jays	1–1	0–2	1–3	.250	16	21
Tampa Bay Rays	—	1–2	1–2	.333	7	7
	6–4	5–5	11–9	.550	97	85

== Farm system ==
The Brewers' farm system consisted of seven minor league affiliates in 2014.

Level	Team	League	Manager
Triple-A	Nashville Sounds	Pacific Coast League	Rick Sweet
Double-A	Huntsville Stars	Southern League	Carlos Subero
Class A-Advanced	Brevard County Manatees	Florida State League	Joe Ayrault
Class A	Wisconsin Timber Rattlers	Midwest League	Matt Erickson
Rookie	Helena Brewers	Pioneer League	Tony Diggs
Rookie	AZL Brewers	Arizona League	Néstor Corredor
Rookie	DSL Brewers	Dominican Summer League	Jose Pena
