= 2014 Arizona Diamondbacks season =

2014 Arizona Diamondbacks
- League: National League
- Division: West
- Ballpark: Chase Field
- City: Phoenix, Arizona
- Record: 64–98 (.395)
- Divisional place: 5th
- Owners: Ken Kendrick
- General managers: Kevin Towers; Dave Stewart
- Managers: Kirk Gibson; Alan Trammell
- Television: Fox Sports Arizona (Steve Berthiaume, Bob Brenly, Greg Schulte)
- Radio: KTAR (620 AM) (Greg Schulte, Tom Candiotti, Jeff Munn); KSUN (Spanish) (Oscar Soria, Miguel Quintana
- Stats: ESPN.com; Baseball Reference

The Arizona Diamondbacks' 2014 season was the franchise's 17th season in Major League Baseball and their 17th season at Chase Field. The team failed to improve on their 81–81 record from 2013. As a result, they finished with a record of 64–98, placing last in the National League West and having the worst record in the major leagues. General manager Kevin Towers was fired on September 5 and replaced by Dave Stewart. On September 26, manager Kirk Gibson was also fired, ending his 4 1/2-year tenure as the Diamondbacks' manager. Bench coach Alan Trammell managed the final three games of the season. On October 13, Chip Hale was announced as the Diamondbacks' manager for 2015.

== Regular season ==
=== March/April ===
This season, Major League Baseball scheduled the Diamondbacks and Los Angeles Dodgers to open the season with a two-game series at the Sydney Cricket Ground in Australia. As a result, both teams began spring training earlier than usual and played abbreviated Cactus League schedules before flying to Australia for the series.

=== Season standings ===
==== National League West ====
NL West
Team	W	L	Pct.	GB	Home	Road
Los Angeles Dodgers	94	68	.580	—	45‍–‍36	49‍–‍32
San Francisco Giants	88	74	.543	6	45‍–‍36	43‍–‍38
San Diego Padres	77	85	.475	17	48‍–‍33	29‍–‍52
Colorado Rockies	66	96	.407	28	45‍–‍36	21‍–‍60
Arizona Diamondbacks	64	98	.395	30	33‍–‍48	31‍–‍50

==== National League Standings ====
Division leaders
Team	W	L	Pct.
Washington Nationals	96	66	.593
Los Angeles Dodgers	94	68	.580
St. Louis Cardinals	90	72	.556

Wild Card teams (Top 2 teams qualify for postseason)
Team	W	L	Pct.	GB
Pittsburgh Pirates	88	74	.543	—
San Francisco Giants	88	74	.543	—
Milwaukee Brewers	82	80	.506	6
New York Mets	79	83	.488	9
Atlanta Braves	79	83	.488	9
Miami Marlins	77	85	.475	11
San Diego Padres	77	85	.475	11
Cincinnati Reds	76	86	.469	12
Philadelphia Phillies	73	89	.451	15
Chicago Cubs	73	89	.451	15
Colorado Rockies	66	96	.407	22
Arizona Diamondbacks	64	98	.395	24

=== Record vs. opponents ===
2014 National League record Source: MLB Standings Grid – 2014
Team	AZ	ATL	CHC	CIN	COL	LAD	MIA	MIL	NYM	PHI	PIT	SD	SF	STL	WSH	AL
Arizona	–	3–3	5–2	3–4	9–10	4–15	3–4	3–4	2–4	2–4	3–4	12–7	6–13	1–5	1–6	7–13
Atlanta	3–3	–	5–1	5–2	4–3	1–6	9–10	5–2	9–10	11–8	3–4	3–4	1–5	2–4	11–8	7–13
Chicago	2–5	1–5	–	8–11	5–2	3–4	4–2	11–8	5–2	3–3	5–14	3–4	2–4	9–10	3–4	9–11
Cincinnati	4–3	2–5	11–8	–	3–4	3–4	4–3	10–9	2–4	3–3	12–7	1–5	5–2	7–12	3–3	6–14
Colorado	10–9	3–4	2–5	4–3	–	6–13	3–4	1–6	3–4	3–3	2–4	10–9	10–9	1–5	1–5	7–13
Los Angeles	15–4	6–1	4–3	4–3	13–6	–	3–3	1–5	4–2	3–4	2–5	12–7	10–9	4–3	2–4	11–9
Miami	4–3	10–9	2–4	3–4	4–3	3–3	–	3–4	8–11	9–10	2–4	3–4	3–4	4–2	6–13	13–7
Milwaukee	4–3	2–5	8–11	9–10	6–1	5–1	4–3	–	4–3	3–4	12–7	3–3	2–4	7–12	2–4	11–9
New York	4–2	10–9	2–5	4–2	4–3	2–4	11–8	3–4	–	13–6	3–4	3–3	1–6	4–3	4–15	11–9
Philadelphia	4–2	8–11	3–3	3–3	3–3	4–3	10–9	4–3	6–13	–	1–6	4–3	2–5	4–3	10–9	7–13
Pittsburgh	4–3	4–3	14–5	7–12	4–2	5–2	4–2	7–12	4–3	6–1	–	3–3	4–2	8–11	3–4	11–9
San Diego	7–12	4–3	4–3	5–1	9–10	7–12	4–3	3–3	3–3	3–4	3–3	–	10–9	3–4	3–4	9–11
San Francisco	13–6	5–1	4–2	2–5	9–10	9–10	4–3	4–2	6–1	5–2	2–4	9–10	–	4–3	2–5	10–10
St. Louis	5–1	4–2	10–9	12–7	5–1	3–4	2–4	12–7	3–4	3–4	11–8	4–3	3–4	–	5–2	8–12
Washington	6–1	8–11	4–3	3–3	5–1	4–2	13–6	4–2	15–4	9–10	4–3	4–3	5–2	2–5	–	10–10

=== Game log ===
Legend
	Diamondbacks win
	Diamondbacks loss
	Postponement
**Bold**	Diamondbacks team member

2014 Game Log
March (0–3)

#	Date	Opponent	Score	Win	Loss	Save	Attendance	Record
1	March 22	Dodgers*	3 – 1	Kershaw (1–0)	**Miley** (0–1)	Jansen (1)	38,266	0–1
2	March 23	Dodgers*	7 – 5	Ryu (1–0)	**Cahill** (0–1)		38,079	0–2
3	March 31	Giants	9 – 8	Machí (1–0)	**Reed** (0–1)	Romo (1)	48,541	0–3
*Game played at Sydney Cricket Ground in Sydney, Australia.

April (9–19)

#	Date	Opponent	Score	Win	Loss	Save	Attendance	Record
4	April 1	Giants	5 – 4	**Miley** (1–1)	Gutiérrez (0–1)	**Reed** (1)	18,974	1–3
5	April 2	Giants	2 – 0	Hudson (1–0)	**Cahill** (0–2)	Romo (2)	19,357	1–4
6	April 3	Giants	8 – 5	Machí (2–0)	**Harris** (0–1)		19,131	1–5
7	April 4	@ Rockies	12 – 2	Nicasio (1–0)	**Delgado** (0–1)		49,130	1–6
8	April 5	@ Rockies	9 – 4	Kahnle (1–0)	**McCarthy** (0–1)		34,407	1–7
9	April 6	@ Rockies	5 – 3	**Miley** (2–1)	Anderson (0–2)	**Reed** (2)	29,779	2–7
10	April 8	@ Giants	7 – 3	Hudson (2–0)	**Cahill** (0–3)		42,166	2–8
11	April 9	@ Giants	7 – 3	**Arroyo** (1–0)	Lincecum (0–1)	**Collmenter** (1)	41,157	3–8
12	April 10	@ Giants	6 – 5 (10)	**Putz** (1–0)	Petit (0–1)	**Reed** (3)	41,577	4–8
13	April 11	Dodgers	6 – 0	Ryu (2–1)	**McCarthy** (0–2)		33,349	4–9
14	April 12	Dodgers	8 – 5	Greinke (3–0)	**Miley** (2–2)	Jansen (3)	38,374	4–10
15	April 13	Dodgers	8 – 6	Haren (2–0)	**Cahill** (0–4)	Jansen (4)	31,757	4–11
16	April 14	Mets	7 – 3	Wheeler (1–2)	**Collmenter** (0–1)	Torres (1)	18,099	4–12
17	April 15	Mets	9 – 0	Mejía (2–0)	**Arroyo** (1–1)		21,969	4–13
18	April 16	Mets	5 – 2	Gee (1–0)	**McCarthy** (0–3)		19,673	4–14
19	April 18	@ Dodgers	4 – 2 (12)	**Thatcher** (1–0)	Pérez (0–1)	**Cahill** (1)	47,680	5–14
20	April 19	@ Dodgers	8 – 6	Haren (3–0)	**Bolsinger** (0–1)	Jansen (6)	48,541	5–15
21	April 20	@ Dodgers	4 – 1	Wright (1–0)	**Collmenter** (0–2)	Jansen (7)	37,447	5–16
22	April 21	@ Cubs	5 – 1	Wood (1–2)	**Arroyo** (1–2)		32,439	5–17
23	April 22	@ Cubs	9 – 2	Hammel (3–1)	**McCarthy** (0–4)		35,381	5–18
24	April 23	@ Cubs	7 – 5	**Cahill** (1–4)	Strop (0–2)	**Reed** (4)	32,323	6–18
25	April 24	@ Cubs	5 – 2	**Bolsinger** (1–1)	Jackson (1–2)	**Reed** (5)	33,085	7–18
26	April 25	Phillies	5 – 4	**Collmenter** (1–2)	Hernández (1–1)	**Reed** (6)	28,168	8–18
27	April 26	Phillies	6 – 5	Manship (1–0)	**Cahill** (1–5)	Papelbon (7)	35,462	8–19
28	April 27	Phillies	2 – 0	Burnett (1–1)	**McCarthy** (0–5)	Papelbon (8)	30,022	8–20
29	April 28	Rockies	8 – 5	Morales (3–1)	**Miley** (2–3)	Hawkins (8)	17,127	8–21
30	April 29	Rockies	5 – 4	Logan (1–0)	**Reed** (0–2)	Hawkins (9)	19,702	8–22
31	April 30	Rockies	5 – 4 (10)	**Reed** (1–2)	Kahnle (2–1)		19,135	9–22

May (14–13)

#	Date	Opponent	Score	Win	Loss	Save	Attendance	Record
32	May 2	@ Padres	2 – 0	**Arroyo** (2–2)	Cashner (2–4)	**Reed** (7)	27,032	10–22
33	May 3	@ Padres	4 – 3	**McCarthy** (1–5)	Kennedy (2–4)	**Reed** (8)	35,213	11–22
34	May 4	@ Padres	4 – 3	Street (1–0)	**Pérez** (0–1)		32,657	11–23
35	May 5	@ Brewers	8 – 3	Garza (2–3)	**Bolsinger** (1–2)		27,220	11–24
36	May 6	@ Brewers	7 – 5	**Marshall** (1–0)	Kintzler (1–1)	**Reed** (9)	27,497	12–24
37	May 7	@ Brewers	3 – 2	**Arroyo** (3–2)	Peralta (4–2)	**Reed** (10)	24,013	13–24
38	May 9	@ White Sox	9 – 3	Rienzo (3–0)	**McCarthy** (1–6)		19,118	13–25
39	May 10	@ White Sox	4 – 3	**Miley** (3–3)	Quintana (1–3)	**Reed** (11)	24,634	14–25
40	May 11	@ White Sox	5 – 1	**Anderson** (1–0)	Noesí (0–3)		18,612	15–25
41	May 12	Nationals	6 – 5	Clippard (3–2)	**Reed** (1–3)	Soriano (8)	16,555	15–26
42	May 13	Nationals	3 – 1	**Arroyo** (4–2)	Strasburg (3–3)		19,025	16–26
43	May 14	Nationals	5 – 1	Clippard (4–2)	**Ziegler** (0–1)		18,325	16–27
44	May 16	Dodgers	7 – 0	Greinke (7–1)	**Miley** (3–4)		31,154	16–28
45	May 17	Dodgers	18 – 7	**Anderson** (2–0)	Kershaw (2–1)		36,688	17–28
46	May 18	Dodgers	5 – 3	**Collmenter** (2–2)	Haren (5–2)	**Reed** (12)	35,406	18–28
47	May 20	@ Cardinals	5 – 0	Wainwright (7–2)	**Arroyo** (4–3)		42,252	18–29
48	May 21	@ Cardinals	3 – 2 (12)	Maness (2–2)	**Cahill** (1–6)		40,542	18–30
49	May 22	@ Cardinals	4 – 2	Neshek (1–0)	**Miley** (3–5)	Rosenthal (14)	40,787	18–31
–	May 23	@ Mets	Postponed (rain) Rescheduled for May 25					
50	May 24	@ Mets	3 – 2	**Collmenter** (3–2)	Wheeler (1–5)	**Reed** (13)	24,551	19–31
51	May 25	@ Mets	2 – 1	**Marshall** (2–0)	Mejía (4–1)	**Reed** (14)	n/a	20–31
52	May 25	@ Mets	4 – 2	Matsuzaka (2–0)	**Spruill** (0–1)	Mejía (3)	30,785	20–32
53	May 26	Padres	7 – 5	**Ziegler** (1–1)	Quackenbush (0–1)		35,580	21–32
54	May 27	Padres	4 – 3	Quackenbush (1–1)	**Marshall** (2–1)	Street (15)	17,862	21–33
55	May 28	Padres	12 – 6	**Anderson** (3–0)	Stauffer (2–1)		22,233	22–33
56	May 29	Reds	4 – 0	**Collmenter** (4–2)	Cingrani (2–5)		18,457	23–33
57	May 30	Reds	6 – 4	Leake (3–4)	**Arroyo** (4–4)	Chapman (6)	19,826	23–34
58	May 31	Reds	5 – 0	Cueto (5–4)	**McCarthy** (1–7)		23,765	23–35

June (12–14)

#	Date	Opponent	Score	Win	Loss	Save	Attendance	Record
59	June 1	Reds	4 – 3	Simón (7–3)	**Miley** (3–6)	Chapman (7)	24,119	23–36
60	June 3	@ Rockies	4 – 2	**Anderson** (4–0)	de la Rosa (6–4)	**Reed** (15)	29,682	24–36
61	June 4	@ Rockies	16 – 8	**Ziegler** (2–1)	Brothers (2–4)		26,199	25–36
62	June 5	@ Rockies	12 – 7	**Arroyo** (5–4)	Nicasio (5–4)		26,521	26–36
63	June 6	Braves	5 – 2	Teherán (6–3)	**McCarthy** (1–8)	Kimbrel (16)	24,504	26–37
64	June 7	Braves	4 – 3 (11)	**Delgado** (1–1)	Carpenter (4–1)		29,278	27–37
65	June 8	Braves	6 – 5	**Anderson** (5–0)	Harang (4–5)	**Ziegler** (1)	26,534	28–37
66	June 9	Astros	4 – 3	Cosart (5–5)	**Collmenter** (4–3)	Qualls (8)	18,805	28–38
67	June 10	Astros	4 – 1	**Arroyo** (6–4)	Fields (1–4)	**Reed** (16)	17,667	29–38
68	June 11	@ Astros	5 – 1	Keuchel (8–3)	**McCarthy** (1–9)		24,319	29–39
69	June 12	@ Astros	5 – 4 (10)	Sipp (1–0)	**Putz** (1–1)		33,457	29–40
70	June 13	@ Dodgers	4 – 3	Kershaw (6–2)	**Anderson** (5–1)	Jansen (18)	42,831	29–41
71	June 14	@ Dodgers	6 – 4	Haren (7–4)	**Collmenter** (4–4)	Jansen (19)	51,422	29–42
72	June 15	@ Dodgers	6 – 3	**Arroyo** (7–4)	Beckett (4–4)		52,519	30–42
73	June 16	Brewers	9 – 3	Peralta (7–5)	**Harris** (0–2)		18,262	30–43
74	June 17	Brewers	7 – 5	Lohse (8–2)	**Marshall** (2–2)	Rodríguez (22)	18,148	30–44
75	June 18	Brewers	4 – 3	**Ziegler** (3–1)	Kintzler (1–3)		19,711	31–44
76	June 19	Brewers	4 – 1	Gallardo (5–4)	**Anderson** (5–2)	Rodríguez (23)	22,559	31–45
77	June 20	Giants	4 – 1	**Collmenter** (5–4)	Lincecum (5–5)	**Reed** (17)	29,295	32–45
78	June 21	Giants	6 – 4	Vogelsong (5–3)	**McCarthy** (1–10)	Romo (21)	37,916	32–46
79	June 22	Giants	4 – 1	Bumgarner (9–4)	**Bolsinger** (1–3)	Romo (22)	27,862	32–47
80	June 24	Indians	9 – 8 (14)	**Collmenter** (6–4)	Lowe (0–1)		20,945	33–47
81	June 25	Indians	6 – 1	Kluber (7–5)	**Anderson** (5–3)		21,269	33–48
82	June 27	@ Padres	2 – 1	**McCarthy** (2–10)	Ross (6–8)	**Reed** (18)	25,897	34–48
83	June 28	@ Padres	3 – 1	**Collmenter** (7–4)	Stults (2–11)	**Reed** (19)	31,527	35–48
84	June 29	@ Padres	2 – 1	Despaigne (2–0)	**Bolsinger** (1–4)	Street (21)	20,267	35–49

July (13–12)

#	Date	Opponent	Score	Win	Loss	Save	Attendance	Record
85	July 1	@ Pirates	3 – 2	Frieri (1–3)	**Reed** (1–4)		21,426	35–50
86	July 2	@ Pirates	5 – 1	Morton (5–9)	**Anderson** (5–4)		24,161	35–51
87	July 3	@ Pirates	10 – 2	**McCarthy** (3–10)	Worley (2–1)		27,473	36–51
88	July 4	@ Braves	5 – 2	Santana (7–5)	**Collmenter** (7–5)	Kimbrel (27)	48,815	36–52
89	July 5	@ Braves	10 – 4	Harang (8–6)	**Bolsinger** (1–5)		30,405	36–53
90	July 6	@ Braves	3 – 1	**Miley** (4–6)	Wood (6–7)	**Reed** (20)	23,709	37–53
91	July 7	Marlins	9 – 1	**Anderson** (6–4)	Koehler (6–7)		17,103	38–53
92	July 8	Marlins	2 – 1	Dunn (7–4)	**Reed** (1–5)	Cishek (20)	18,319	38–54
93	July 9	Marlins	4 – 3 (10)	**Ziegler** (4–1)	Cishek (4–5)		18,268	39–54
94	July 11	@ Giants	5 – 0	Lincecum (9–5)	**Bolsinger** (1–6)		41,647	39–55
95	July 12	@ Giants	2 – 0	**Miley** (5–6)	Vogelsong (5–7)	**Reed** (21)	41,261	40–55
96	July 13	@ Giants	8 – 4	Bumgarner (10–7)	**Nuño** (2–6)		41,288	40–56
97	July 18	Cubs	5 – 4	**de la Rosa** (1–0)	Schlitter (2–3)	**Reed** (22)	32,619	41–56
98	July 19	Cubs	9 – 3	**Miley** (6–6)	Wood (7–9)		32,528	42–56
99	July 20	Cubs	3 – 2	**Collmenter** (8–5)	Arrieta (5–2)	**Reed** (23)	37,131	43–56
100	July 21	Tigers	4 – 3	Verlander (9–8)	**Delgado** (1–2)	Nathan (20)	25,907	43–57
101	July 22	Tigers	5 – 4	**de la Rosa** (2–0)	Coke (1–2)	**Reed** (24)	29,515	44–57
102	July 23	Tigers	11 – 5	Sánchez (7–4)	**Cahill** (1–7)		24,174	44–58
103	July 25	@ Phillies	9 – 5	Kendrick (5–10)	**Miley** (6–7)		25,698	44–59
104	July 26	@ Phillies	10 – 6 (10)	**Marshall** (3–2)	Bastardo (4–4)		29,097	45–59
105	July 27	@ Phillies	4 – 2	Hernández (5–8)	**Nuño** (2–7)	Papelbon (25)	31,514	45–60
106	July 28	@ Reds	2 – 1 (15)	**Pérez** (1–1)	Hoover (1–8)	**Reed** (25)	30,288	46–60
107	July 29	@ Reds	3 – 0	Leake (8–9)	**Cahill** (1–8)	Chapman (23)	33,153	46–61
108	July 30	@ Reds	5 – 4	**Miley** (7–7)	Simón (12–6)	**Reed** (26)	26,332	47–61
109	July 31	Pirates	7 – 4	**Pérez** (2–1)	Locke (2–3)	**Reed** (27)	20,145	48–61

August (9–18)

#	Date	Opponent	Score	Win	Loss	Save	Attendance	Record
110	August 1	Pirates	9 – 4	Watson (8–1)	**Schultz** (0–1)		22,766	48–62
111	August 2	Pirates	8 – 3	Hughes (6–2)	**Ziegler** (4–2)		33,151	48–63
112	August 3	Pirates	3 – 2 (10)	**Marshall** (4–2)	Melançon (1–3)		26,913	49–63
113	August 5	Royals	12 – 2	Duffy (6–10)	**Miley** (7–8)		16,677	49–64
114	August 6	Royals	4 – 3	Ventura (9–8)	**Collmenter** (8–6)	Holland (32)	16,157	49–65
115	August 7	Royals	6 – 2	Guthrie (8–9)	**Nuño** (2–8)		17,809	49–66
116	August 8	Rockies	5 – 3	**Anderson** (7–4)	Matzek (2–7)		21,782	50–66
117	August 9	Rockies	14 – 4	**Cahill** (2–8)	de la Rosa (11–8)		24,993	51–66
118	August 10	Rockies	5 – 3 (10)	Bélisle (3–6)	**Pérez** (2–2)	Hawkins (18)	22,104	51–67
–	August 12	@ Indians	Postponed (rain) Rescheduled for August 13					
119	August 13	@ Indians	3 – 2	Allen (4–2)	**Delgado** (1–3)		n/a	51–68
120	August 13	@ Indians	1 – 0 (12)	**Delgado** (2–3)	Lee (0–1)	**Reed** (28)	17,562	52–68
121	August 14	@ Marlins	5 – 4 (10)	Dunn (10–5)	**Hagens** (0–1)		17,074	52–69
122	August 15	@ Marlins	3 – 2	**Cahill** (3–8)	Hand (2–5)	**Reed** (29)	18,286	53–69
123	August 16	@ Marlins	2 – 1	Álvarez (9–5)	**Miley** (7–9)	Cishek (31)	19,563	53–70
124	August 17	@ Marlins	10 – 3	Koehler (9–9)	**Collmenter** (8–7)		19,296	53–71
125	August 18	@ Nationals	5 – 4 (11)	Stammen (3–4)	**Harris** (0–3)		21,292	53–72
126	August 19	@ Nationals	8 – 1	Strasburg (10–10)	**Anderson** (7–5)		26,827	53–73
127	August 20	@ Nationals	3 – 2	Soriano (3–1)	**Marshall** (4–3)		24,113	53–74
128	August 21	@ Nationals	1 – 0	Soriano (4–1)	**Pérez** (2–3)		32,311	53–75
129	August 22	Padres	5 – 1	**Collmenter** (9–7)	Despaigne (3–5)		24,835	54–75
130	August 23	Padres	5 – 2	**Pérez** (3–3)	Quackenbush (2–3)	**Reed** (30)	30,583	55–75
131	August 24	Padres	7 – 4	Kennedy (10–11)	**Anderson** (7–6)	Benoit (8)	20,852	55–76
132	August 26	Dodgers	9 – 5	Hernández (8–9)	**Cahill** (3–9)		21,758	55–77
133	August 27	Dodgers	3 – 1	Kershaw (16–3)	**Miley** (7–10)	Jansen (38)	28,394	55–78
134	August 29	Rockies	5 – 2	**Ziegler** (5–2)	Brothers (4–6)	**Reed** (31)	22,585	56–78
135	August 30	Rockies	2 – 0	Matzek (4–9)	**Nuño** (2–9)	Hawkins (22)	27,272	56–79
136	August 31	Rockies	6 – 2	**Anderson** (8–6)	de la Rosa (13–10)		22,948	57–79

September (7–19)

#	Date	Opponent	Score	Win	Loss	Save	Attendance	Record
137	September 1	@ Padres	3 – 1	Ross (13–12)	**Cahill** (3–10)	Quackenbush (2)	18,564	57–80
138	September 2	@ Padres	2 – 1	Quackenbush (3–3)	**Ziegler** (5–3)		14,316	57–81
139	September 3	@ Padres	6 – 1	**Collmenter** (10–7)	Cashner (2–7)		16,335	58–81
140	September 4	@ Padres	5 – 1	**Delgado** (3–3)	Kennedy (10–12)		16,025	59–81
141	September 5	@ Dodgers	2 – 1	Haren (12–10)	**Nuño** (2–10)	Jansen (40)	43,074	59–82
142	September 6	@ Dodgers	5 – 2	Wilson (2–3)	**Hudson** (0–1)	Jansen (41)	50,823	59–83
143	September 7	@ Dodgers	7 – 2	Greinke (14–8)	**Cahill** (3–11)		43,460	59–84
144	September 9	@ Giants	5 – 1	Petit (5–3)	**Miley** (7–11)		41,683	59–85
145	September 10	@ Giants	5 – 0	Machí (7–1)	**Pérez** (3–4)		41,293	59–86
146	September 11	@ Giants	6 – 2	Peavy (6–13)	**Delgado** (3–4)		41,039	59–87
147	September 12	Padres	6 – 5	Stults (7–16)	**Nuño** (2–11)	Quackenbush (3)	31,238	59–88
148	September 13	Padres	10 – 4	**Anderson** (9–6)	Ross (13–14)		32,429	60–88
149	September 14	Padres	8 – 6	**Spruill** (1–1)	Despaigne (3–7)		26,075	61–88
150	September 15	Giants	6 – 2	**Miley** (8–11)	Vogelsong (8–11)		21,731	62–88
151	September 16	Giants	2 – 1	Peavy (7–13)	**Collmenter** (10–8)	Casilla (16)	26,339	62–89
152	September 17	Giants	4 – 2	Romo (6–4)	**Reed** (1–6)	Casilla (17)	19,272	62–90
153	September 18	@ Rockies	7 – 6	Hawkins (4–3)	**Reed** (1–7)		23,775	62–91
154	September 19	@ Rockies	15 – 3	Lyles (7–3)	**Anderson** (9–7)		37,022	62–92
155	September 20	@ Rockies	5 – 1	Butler (1–1)	**Cahill** (3–12)		33,764	62–93
156	September 21	@ Rockies	8 – 3	Bergman (3–4)	**Miley** (8–12)		29,036	62–94
157	September 22	@ Twins	6 – 2	**Collmenter** (11–8)	Nolasco (5–12)		22,571	63–94
158	September 23	@ Twins	6 – 3	Gibson (13–11)	**Chafin** (0–1)		28,902	63–95
159	September 24	@ Twins	2 – 1	Hughes (16–10)	**Nuño** (2–12)	Burton (3)	29,445	63–96
160	September 26	Cardinals	7 – 6 (10)	Gonzales (4–2)	**Marshall** (4–4)	Rosenthal (45)	41,963	63–97
161	September 27	Cardinals	5 – 2	**Delgado** (4–4)	Maness (6–4)	**Reed** (32)	39,843	64–97
162	September 28	Cardinals	1 – 0	Masterson (7–9)	**Collmenter** (11–9)	Martínez (1)	30,617	64–98

=== Roster ===
2014 Arizona Diamondbacks
**Roster**
**Pitchers**: 57 Chase Anderson; 61 Bronson Arroyo; 49 Mike Bolsinger; 35 Trevor Cahill; 40 Andrew Chafin; 55 Josh Collmenter; 56 Eury De La Rosa; 48 Randall Delgado; 60 Bradin Hagens; 38 Will Harris; 41 Daniel Hudson; 50 Evan Marshall; 32 Brandon McCarthy; 36 Wade Miley; 54 Vidal Nuño; 47 Joe Paterson; 59 Óliver Pérez; 40 J. J. Putz; 43 Addison Reed; 50 Ryan Rowland-Smith; 58 Bo Schultz; 52 Zeke Spruill; 37 Matt Stites; 54 Joe Thatcher; 29 Brad Ziegler	**Catchers**: 9 Tuffy Gosewisch; 26 Miguel Montero; 18 Bobby Wilson; **Infielders**: 13 Nick Ahmed; 12 Eric Chavez; 28 Nick Evans; 44 Paul Goldschmidt; 1 Didi Gregorius; 2 Aaron Hill; 19 Jake Lamb; 28 Andy Marte; 16 Chris Owings; 31 Jordan Pacheco; 4 Cliff Pennington; 14 Martín Prado	**Outfielders**: 19 Tony Campana; 5 Ender Inciarte; 62 Brett Jackson; 27 Roger Kieschnick; 17 Alfredo Marte; 8 Gerardo Parra; 14 Xavier Paul; 6 David Peralta; 11 A. J. Pollock; 12 Nolan Reimold; 7 Cody Ross; 15 Mark Trumbo	**Manager**: 23 Kirk Gibson; 3 Alan Trammell; **Coaches**: 24 Henry Blanco (coach); –– Mike Fetters (quality assurance coach); 22 Mike Harkey (pitching); 39 Dave McKay (first base); 83 Mark Reed (bullpen catcher); 53 Glenn Sherlock (third base); 34 Mel Stottlemyre Jr. (bullpen); 3 Alan Trammell (bench); 10 Turner Ward (hitting)

Opening Day Starters
Name	Position
A. J. Pollock	Center fielder
Aaron Hill	Second baseman
Paul Goldschmidt	First baseman
Martín Prado	Third baseman
Mark Trumbo	Left fielder
Miguel Montero	Catcher
Chris Owings	Shortstop
Gerardo Parra	Right fielder
Wade Miley	Starting pitcher

== Player stats ==
Up to date as of September 28, 2014.

Both tables are sortable.

=== Batting ===
Note: G = Games played; AB = At bats; R = Runs scored; H = Hits; 2B = Doubles; 3B = Triples; HR = Home runs; RBI = Runs batted in; AVG = Batting average; SB = Stolen bases

Player	G	AB	R	H	2B	3B	HR	RBI	AVG	SB
Paul Goldschmidt	109	406	75	122	39	1	19	69	.300	9
Didi Gregorius	80	270	35	61	9	5	6	27	.226	3
Aaron Hill	133	501	52	122	26	3	10	60	.244	4
Miguel Montero	136	489	40	119	23	0	13	72	.243	0
Chris Owings	91	310	34	81	15	6	6	26	.261	8
Gerardo Parra	104	406	51	105	18	3	6	30	.259	5
A. J. Pollock	75	265	41	80	19	6	7	24	.302	14
Martín Prado	106	403	44	109	17	4	5	42	.270	2
Mark Trumbo	88	328	37	77	15	1	14	61	.235	2
David Peralta	88	329	40	94	12	9	8	36	.286	6
Ender Inciarte	118	418	54	116	18	2	4	27	.278	19
Cody Ross	83	202	15	51	8	0	2	15	.252	0
Cliff Pennington	68	177	21	45	5	3	2	10	.254	6
Tuffy Gosewisch	41	129	6	29	8	0	1	7	.225	0
Jake Lamb	37	126	15	29	4	1	4	11	.230	1
Alfredo Marte	44	106	8	18	5	1	2	9	.170	1
Jordan Pacheco	47	81	6	22	4	0	0	8	.272	0
Nick Ahmed	25	70	9	14	2	0	1	4	.200	0
Eric Chavez	44	69	6	17	3	1	3	8	.246	2
Tony Campana	26	60	4	9	1	1	0	3	.150	4
Roger Kieschnick	25	41	2	8	1	0	1	2	.195	0
Nick Evans	18	22	2	6	2	0	2	7	.273	0
Xavier Paul	14	20	2	2	0	0	0	0	.100	0
Nolan Reimold	7	17	2	5	1	0	1	4	.294	0
Andy Marte	6	16	1	3	0	0	1	3	.188	0
Brett Jackson	7	4	0	0	0	0	0	0	.000	0
Bobby Wilson	2	4	0	1	0	0	0	0	.250	0
Pitcher Totals	162	283	13	34	4	0	0	8	.120	0
Team totals	162	5552	615	1379	259	47	118	573	.248	86

Complete batting stats can be found here .

=== Pitching ===
Note: W = Wins; L = Losses; ERA = Earned run average; G = Games pitched; GS = Games started; SV = Saves; IP = Innings pitched; H = Hits allowed; R = Runs allowed; ER = Earned runs allowed; BB = Walks allowed; K = Strikeouts

Player	W	L	ERA	G	GS	SV	IP	H	R	ER	BB	K
Wade Miley	8	12	4.34	33	33	0	201.1	207	97	97	75	183
Josh Collmenter	11	9	3.46	33	28	1	179.1	163	69	69	39	115
Chase Anderson	9	7	4.01	21	21	0	114.1	117	51	51	40	105
Trevor Cahill	3	12	5.61	32	17	1	110.2	123	76	69	55	105
Brandon McCarthy	3	10	5.01	18	18	0	109.2	131	65	61	20	93
Bronson Arroyo	7	4	4.08	14	14	0	86.0	92	40	39	19	47
Addison Reed	1	7	4.25	62	0	32	59.1	57	31	28	15	69
Randall Delgado	4	4	4.87	47	4	0	77.2	71	44	42	35	86
Brad Ziegler	5	3	3.49	68	0	1	67.0	60	29	26	24	54
Óliver Pérez	3	4	2.91	68	0	0	58.2	50	19	19	24	76
Evan Marshall	4	4	2.74	57	0	0	49.1	50	15	15	17	54
Vidal Nuño	0	7	3.76	14	14	0	83.2	71	37	35	20	69
Mike Bolsinger	1	6	5.50	10	9	0	52.1	66	36	32	17	48
Eury De La Rosa	2	0	2.95	25	0	0	36.2	37	12	12	14	32
Matt Stites	0	0	5.73	37	0	0	33.0	33	23	21	16	26
Will Harris	0	3	4.34	29	0	0	29.0	27	14	14	9	35
Joe Thatcher	1	0	2.63	37	0	0	24.0	23	7	7	3	25
Zeke Spruill	1	1	3.57	6	1	0	22.2	27	11	9	4	14
Andrew Chafin	0	1	3.86	3	3	0	14.0	13	6	6	8	10
J. J. Putz	1	1	6.59	18	0	0	13.2	17	10	10	6	14
Bo Schultz	0	1	7.88	4	0	0	8.0	13	7	7	1	5
Ryan Rowland-Smith	0	0	4.91	6	0	0	7.1	7	5	4	4	9
Daniel Hudson	0	1	13.50	3	0	0	2.2	4	4	4	0	2
Bradin Hagens	0	1	3.38	2	0	0	2.2	4	1	1	3	2
Joe Paterson	0	0	33.75	3	0	0	1.1	4	5	5	1	0
Team totals	64	98	4.26	162	162	35	1444.1	1467	742	683	469	1278

Complete pitching stats can be found here .

== Farm system ==
Level	Team	League	Manager
AAA	Reno Aces	Pacific Coast League	Phil Nevin
AA	Mobile BayBears	Southern League	Andy Green
A	Visalia Rawhide	California League	Robby Hammock
A	South Bend Silver Hawks	Midwest League	Mark Haley
A-Short Season	Hillsboro Hops	Northwest League	J. R. House
Rookie	AZL Diamondbacks	Arizona League	Audo Vicente
Rookie	Missoula Osprey	Pioneer League	Luis Urueta

League Champions: Hillsboro
