= Nick Christiani =

American baseball pitcher (born 1987)

- Pitcher
- Born: July 17, 1987 (age 39); Linden, New Jersey, U.S.
- Batted: Right Threw: Right

MLB debut
- August 23, 2013, for the Cincinnati Reds

Last MLB appearance
- May 10, 2014, for the Cincinnati Reds

MLB statistics
- Win–loss record: 0–1
- Earned run average: 4.76
- Strikeouts: 9
- Stats at Baseball Reference

Teams
- Cincinnati Reds (2013–2014)

Nicholas John Christiani (born July 17, 1987) is an American former professional baseball pitcher. He played in Major League Baseball (MLB) for the Cincinnati Reds in 2013 and 2014.

== Amateur career ==
Christiani is originally from Linden, New Jersey and attended Seton Hall Prep before moving onto Vanderbilt University where he would play for the Commodores. In 2007, he played collegiate summer baseball with the Orleans Cardinals of the Cape Cod Baseball League, and returned to the league in 2008 to play for the Brewster Whitecaps.

== Professional career ==
Christiani was drafted by the Cincinnati Reds in the 13th round, with the 389th overall selection, of the 2009 Major League Baseball draft. He made his professional debut in 2010, splitting the year between the Single-A Dayton Dragons, High-A Lynchburg Hillcats, and Double-A Carolina Mudcats. In 47 appearances for the three affiliates, Christiani accumulated a 2–3 record and 3.56 ERA with 50 strikeouts and five saves across 68 1/3 innings pitched.

Christiani split the 2011 campaign between Carolina and the Triple-A Louisville Bats. In 53 appearances out of the bullpen for the two affiliates, he compiled an aggregate 4–3 record and 3.82 ERA with 41 strikeouts and 10 saves across 61 1/3 innings pitched. Christiani returned to Louisville in 2012, logging a 2–5 record and 3.34 ERA with 35 strikeouts and one save across 72 2/3 innings pitched. He returned to Louisville to begin the year for a third consecutive season in 2013.

On August 22, 2013, Christiani was selected to the 40-man roster and promoted to the major leagues for the first time. He made three appearances for Cincinnati during his rookie campaign, recording a 2.25 ERA with one strikeout over four innings of work.

Christiani made 10 appearances for the Reds during the 2014 campaign, posting an 0–1 record and 5.54 ERA with eight strikeouts over 13 innings of work. On August 2, 2014, Christiani was designated for assignment by Cincinnati following the acquisition of Jake Elmore. He cleared waivers and was sent outright to Triple-A Louisville on August 6.

Christiani split the 2015 season between Louisville and the Double-A Pensacola Blue Wahoos, logging a cumulative 0–2 record and 6.00 ERA with 22 strikeouts over 36 innings of work. He underwent Tommy John surgery prior to the 2016 season, and missed the entire year as a result.

Christiani made 12 appearances for Triple-A Louisville in 2017, but struggled to a 9.00 ERA with 16 strikeouts over 15 innings of work. He was released by the Reds organization on June 21, 2017.
