= Ryan Dennick =

American baseball player (born 1987)

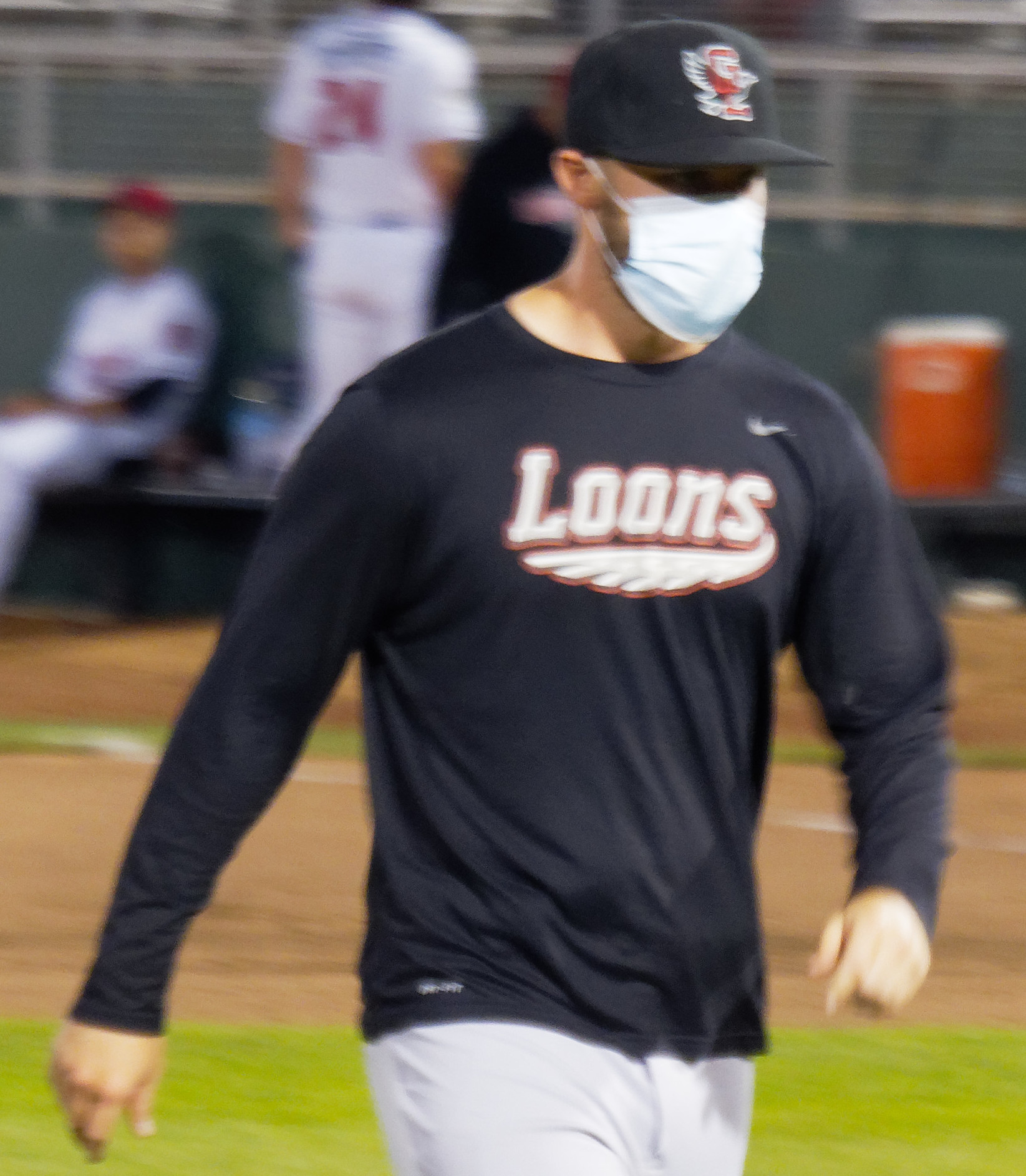
- Dennick with the Great Lakes Loons in 2021
- Pitcher
- Born: January 10, 1987 (age 39); North Olmsted, Ohio, U.S.
- Batted: Left Threw: Left

MLB debut
- September 2, 2014, for the Cincinnati Reds

Last MLB appearance
- September 29, 2014, for the Cincinnati Reds

MLB statistics
- Win–loss record: 0–0
- Earned run average: 11.57
- Strikeouts: 3
- Stats at Baseball Reference

Teams
- Cincinnati Reds (2014)

Ryan Dennick (born January 10, 1987) is an American former professional baseball pitcher. He played in Major League Baseball (MLB) for the Cincinnati Reds.

== Playing career ==
=== Kansas City Royals ===
Dennick was drafted by the Kansas City Royals in the 22nd round of the 2009 Major League Baseball draft out of Tennessee Technological University.

=== Cincinnati Reds ===
On December 6, 2012, the Cincinnati Reds selected Dennick in the minor league phase of the Rule 5 Draft.

Dennick was called up to the major leagues for the first time on September 2, 2014, and made his major league debut that day against the Baltimore Orioles. In 8 appearances during his rookie campaign, he struggled to an 11.57 ERA with 3 strikeouts over 4 2/3 innings pitched. On April 13, 2015, Dennick was designated for assignment by the Reds.

=== Los Angeles Dodgers ===
The Los Angeles Dodgers claimed Dennick off waivers on April 15, 2015. He was assigned to the Double–A Tulsa Drillers but was designated for assignment on April 17. He was outrighted to the minors and appeared in 47 games for the Drillers, with a 2.94 ERA.

=== Lancaster Barnstormers ===
On May 6, 2016, Dennick signed with the Lancaster Barnstormers of the Atlantic League of Professional Baseball. He became a free agent after the 2016 season.

== Coaching career ==
Dennick has served the pitching coach for the Tulsa Drillers, the Double–A affiliate of the Los Angeles Dodgers, since the 2023 season.

In 2025, Dennick was named as assistant pitching coach for the Oklahoma City Comets the Triple-A affiliate of the Los Angeles Dodgers.

== See also ==
- Rule 5 draft results
