= Carlos Contreras (baseball) =

Dominican baseball player (born 1991)

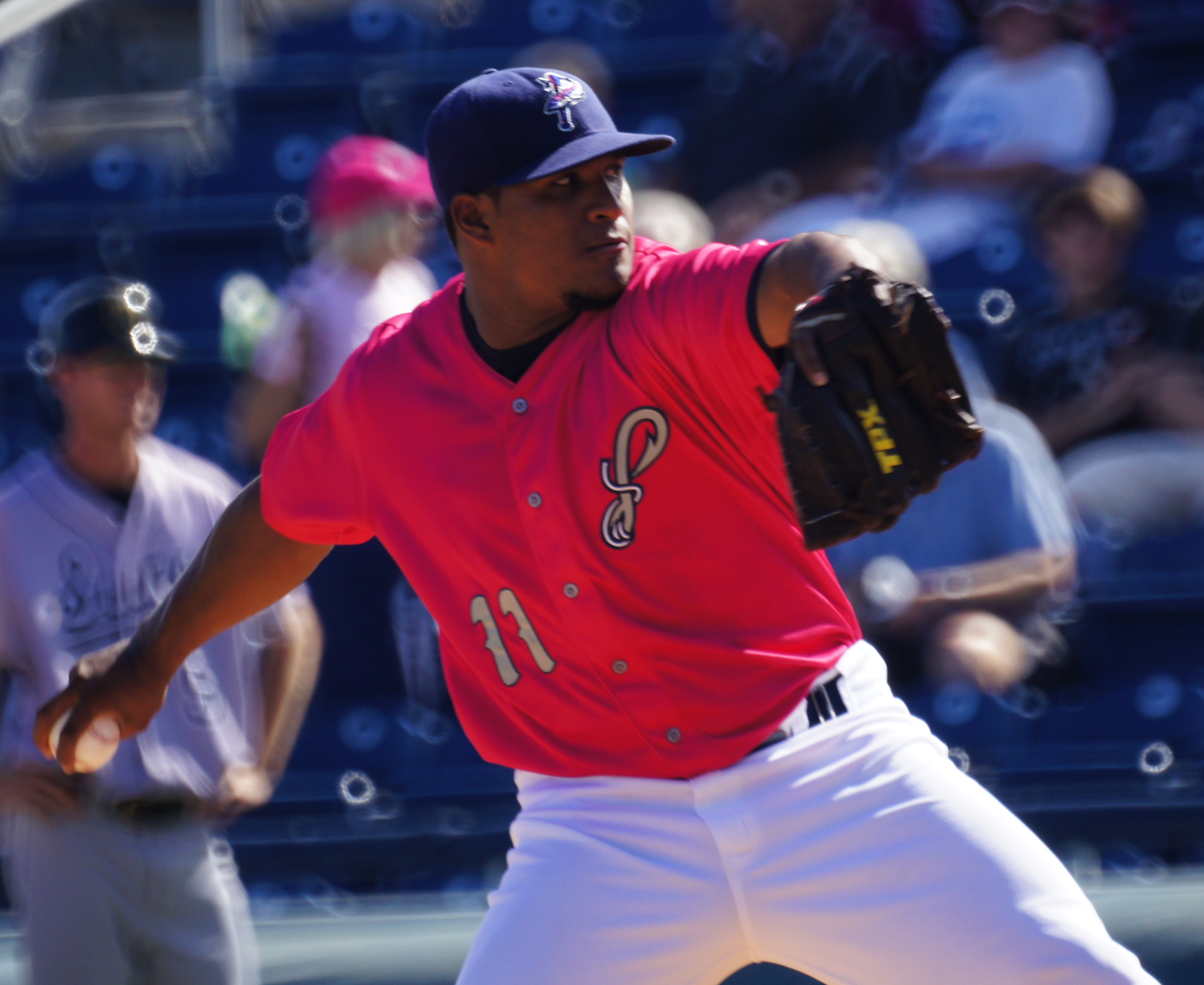
- Contreras pitching for the Pensacola Blue Wahoos in 2013

Tecolotes de los Dos Laredos – No. 12
- Pitcher
- Born: January 8, 1991 (age 35); Santo Domingo, Dominican Republic
- Bats: Right Throws: Right

MLB debut
- June 21, 2014, for the Cincinnati Reds

MLB statistics (through 2015 season)
- Win–loss record: 0–1
- Earned run average: 5.51
- Strikeouts: 38
- Stats at Baseball Reference

Teams
- Cincinnati Reds (2014–2015)

Career highlights and awards
- Pitched an immaculate inning on July 11, 2014.

Carlos Manuel Contreras (born January 8, 1991) is a Dominican professional baseball pitcher for the Tecolotes de los Dos Laredos of the Mexican League. He has previously played in Major League Baseball (MLB) for the Cincinnati Reds in 2014 and 2015.

== Professional career ==
=== Cincinnati Reds ===
The Cincinnati Reds added Contreras to their 40-man roster after the 2012 season. He was named to appear in the 2013 All Star Futures Game.

Contreras was called up to the Reds from the Double-A Pensacola Blue Wahoos on June 21, 2014, and made his debut the same day against the Toronto Blue Jays in the ninth inning. In nine pitches he retired the side and recorded his first major league strikeout. Contreras was released by the Reds on March 15, 2016.

=== Texas AirHogs ===
On April 20, 2017, Contreras signed with the Laredo Lemurs of the American Association of Independent Professional Baseball. When the Lemurs folded before the season started he signed on with the Texas AirHogs.

=== Vaqueros Unión Laguna ===
On June 28, 2017, Contreras left the AirHogs to sign with the Vaqueros Unión Laguna of the Mexican Baseball League. He was released on February 1, 2018.

=== Texas AirHogs (second stint) ===
On June 17, 2018, Contreras signed with the AirHogs. He was released on May 15, 2019. Contreras later re-signed with the AirHogs on August 1, 2019. In 2020, the team was not selected by the league to compete in the condensed season due to the COVID-19 pandemic. Contreras was not chosen by another team in the dispersal draft, and therefore became a free agent.

=== Parma Baseball Club ===
On February 18, 2022, Contreras was signed by Parma Baseball. He made 16 appearances for the team, recording a 1.09 ERA with 60 strikeouts and three saves across 33 innings pitched.

On April 6, 2023, Contreras re–signed with Parma. He pitched in eight games for the club, logging a 1.20 ERA with 18 strikeouts across 15 innings of work.

=== Saraperos de Saltillo ===
On April 9, 2024, Contreras signed with the Saraperos de Saltillo of the Mexican League. He made only one appearance for Saltillo, logging a scoreless inning with one strikeout.

=== Rieleros de Aguascalientes ===
On April 26, 2024, Contreras was traded to the Rieleros de Aguascalientes of the Mexican League. In six appearances, he posted an inflated 15.43 ERA, giving up 8 earned runs in 4 2/3 innings. Contreras was released by the Rieleros on May 27.

=== Tecolotes de los Dos Laredos ===
On July 17, 2026, Contreras signed with the Tecolotes de los Dos Laredos of the Mexican League.
