= Yorman Rodríguez =

Venezuelan baseball player (born 1992)

- Outfielder
- Born: August 15, 1992 (age 32); Ocumare de la Costa, Venezuela
- Batted: Right Threw: Right

MLB debut
- September 4, 2014, for the Cincinnati Reds

Last appearance
- September 28, 2014, for the Cincinnati Reds

MLB statistics
- Batting average: .222
- Home runs: 0
- Runs batted in: 2
- Stats at Baseball Reference

Teams
- Cincinnati Reds (2014)

Yorman José Rodríguez (born August 15, 1992) is a Venezuelan former professional baseball outfielder. He played in Major League Baseball (MLB) for the Cincinnati Reds for one season in 2014.

== Professional career ==
The Cincinnati Reds signed Rodríguez, considered a five-tool player, as an international free agent during the summer of 2008 for a $2.5 million signing bonus. Rodríguez made his professional debut in 2009, and played in the Reds minor league system through the 2012 season, reaching as high as High–A with the Bakersfield Blaze. On November 19, 2012, the Reds added Rodríguez to their 40-man roster to protect him from the Rule 5 draft.

Rodriguez spent the entire 2013 season in the minors, splitting the season between the Double-A Pensacola Blue Wahoos and Bakersfield, hitting a cumulative .259/.324/.427 on the year. He spent the majority of 2014 in Pensacola, playing in 119 games before he was called up to the majors for the first time on September 2, 2014. On September 4, Rodríguez made his MLB debut against the Baltimore Orioles as the starting right fielder, going hitless in 3 at-bats. On September 14, Rodríguez notched his first major league hit off of Milwaukee Brewers reliever Rob Wooten. In 11 games for Cincinnati, Rodríguez gathered 6 hits in 29 plate appearances, also notching 2 RBI.

Rodríguez began the 2015 season in Triple–A with the Louisville Bats. On July 6, 2015, Rodríguez was recalled to the active roster, however he was optioned back down to Louisville on July 11 without making a major league appearance. A few days later he was placed on the disabled list with a left calf strain, and missed the remainder of the season because of the injury.

Rodríguez missed the beginning of the 2016 season with a hamstring injury, and on May 22, 2016, he was placed on the 60-day injured list as he continued to recover. He did not appear in a major league game in 2016, but appeared in 27 games for the High–A Daytona Tortugas as he rehabbed his injury. On October 28, Rodríguez was outrighted off of the 40-man roster. He elected free agency following the season on November 7.

== See also ==
- List of Major League Baseball players from Venezuela
