= Jake Elmore =

American baseball player (born 1987)

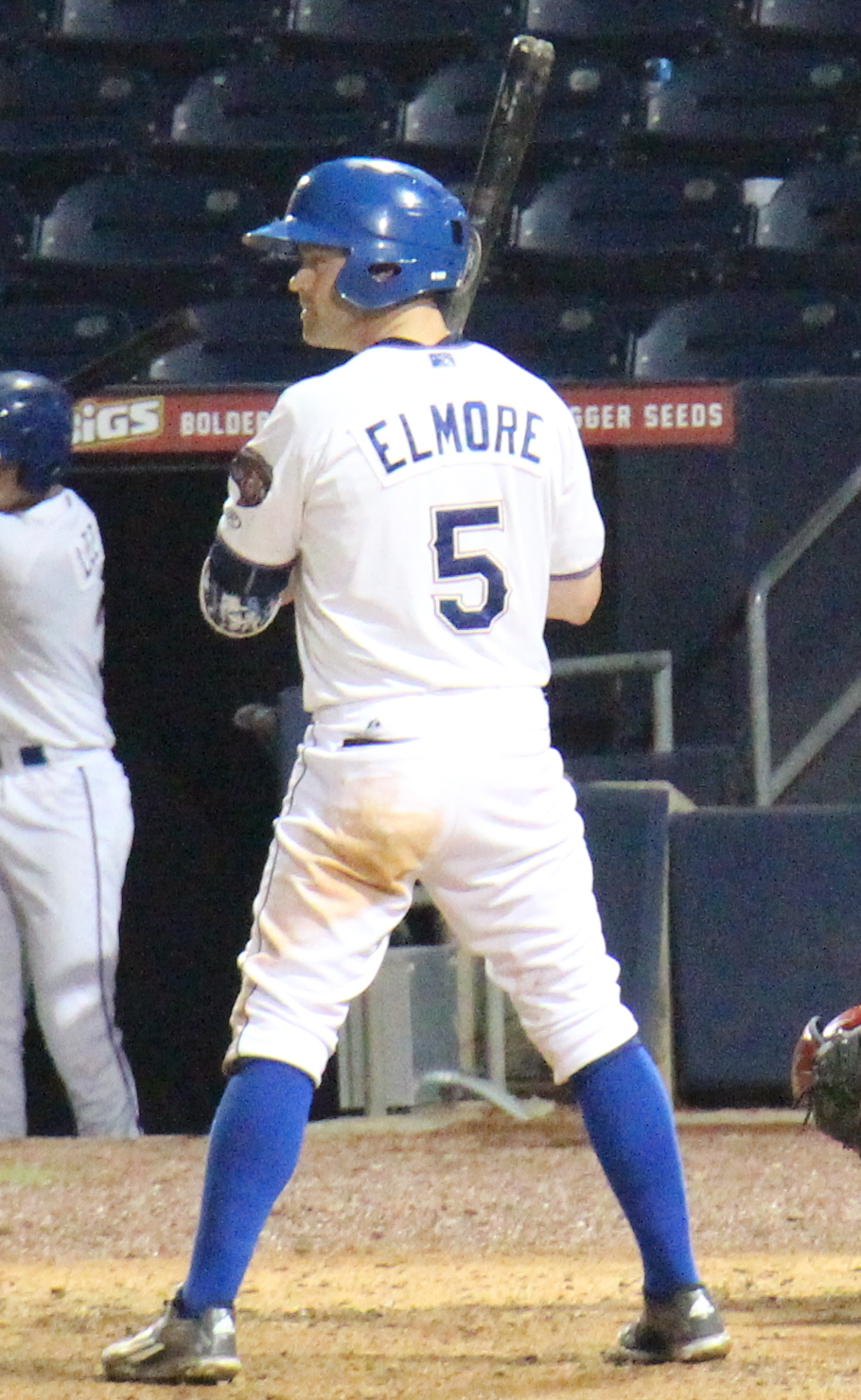
- Elmore with the Durham Bulls
- Infielder
- Born: June 15, 1987 (age 39); Pleasant Grove, Alabama, U.S.
- Batted: Right Threw: Right

MLB debut
- August 11, 2012, for the Arizona Diamondbacks

Last MLB appearance
- September 29, 2019, for the Pittsburgh Pirates

MLB statistics
- Batting average: .215
- Home runs: 4
- Runs batted in: 37
- Stats at Baseball Reference

Teams
- Arizona Diamondbacks (2012); Houston Astros (2013); Cincinnati Reds (2014); Tampa Bay Rays (2015); Milwaukee Brewers (2016); Pittsburgh Pirates (2019)

Jacob David Elmore (born June 15, 1987) is an American former professional baseball infielder. He played in Major League Baseball (MLB) for the Arizona Diamondbacks, Houston Astros, Cincinnati Reds, Tampa Bay Rays, Milwaukee Brewers, and Pittsburgh Pirates. While most often a shortstop, Elmore is one of a handful of MLB players who have played pitcher and catcher in the same game. Elmore was also the 14th player in MLB history to play all nine positions throughout a season with the Houston Astros (2013).

== Early life ==
Elmore grew up in Pleasant Grove, Alabama, a suburb of Birmingham, and played baseball at Pleasant Grove High School. He attended Wallace State Community College in 2006 and 2007, where he played as a second baseman. Elmore transferred to Arizona State University, where he continued his college baseball career with the Arizona State Sun Devils.

== Professional career ==
=== Arizona Diamondbacks ===
Elmore was drafted by the Arizona Diamondbacks in the 34th round, 1038th overall, of the 2008 Major League Baseball draft. After signing, Elmore made his professional debut with the rookie-level Missoula Osprey, slashing .296/.390/.464. In 2009, Elmore played for the Single-A South Bend Silver Hawks, posting a .258/.365/.351 slash line with 3 home runs and 38 RBI. The next year, he played for the Double-A Mobile BayBears, logging a .278/.374/.345 slash line with 2 home runs and 31 RBI. Elmore returned to Mobile for the 2011 season, playing in 121 games and batting .270/.362/.349 with 3 home runs and 41 RBI. In 2012, Elmore began the year with the Triple-A Reno Aces, hitting .344/.442/.465 with 1 home run and a career-high 73 RBI.

Elmore was selected to the 40-man roster and promoted to the majors for the first time on August 11, 2012. On August 16, 2012, he recorded his first career hit, and finished the game 2-for-4 with a double. Elmore finished his rookie season with a .191 batting average with 0 home runs, 7 runs batted in 30 games.

=== Houston Astros ===
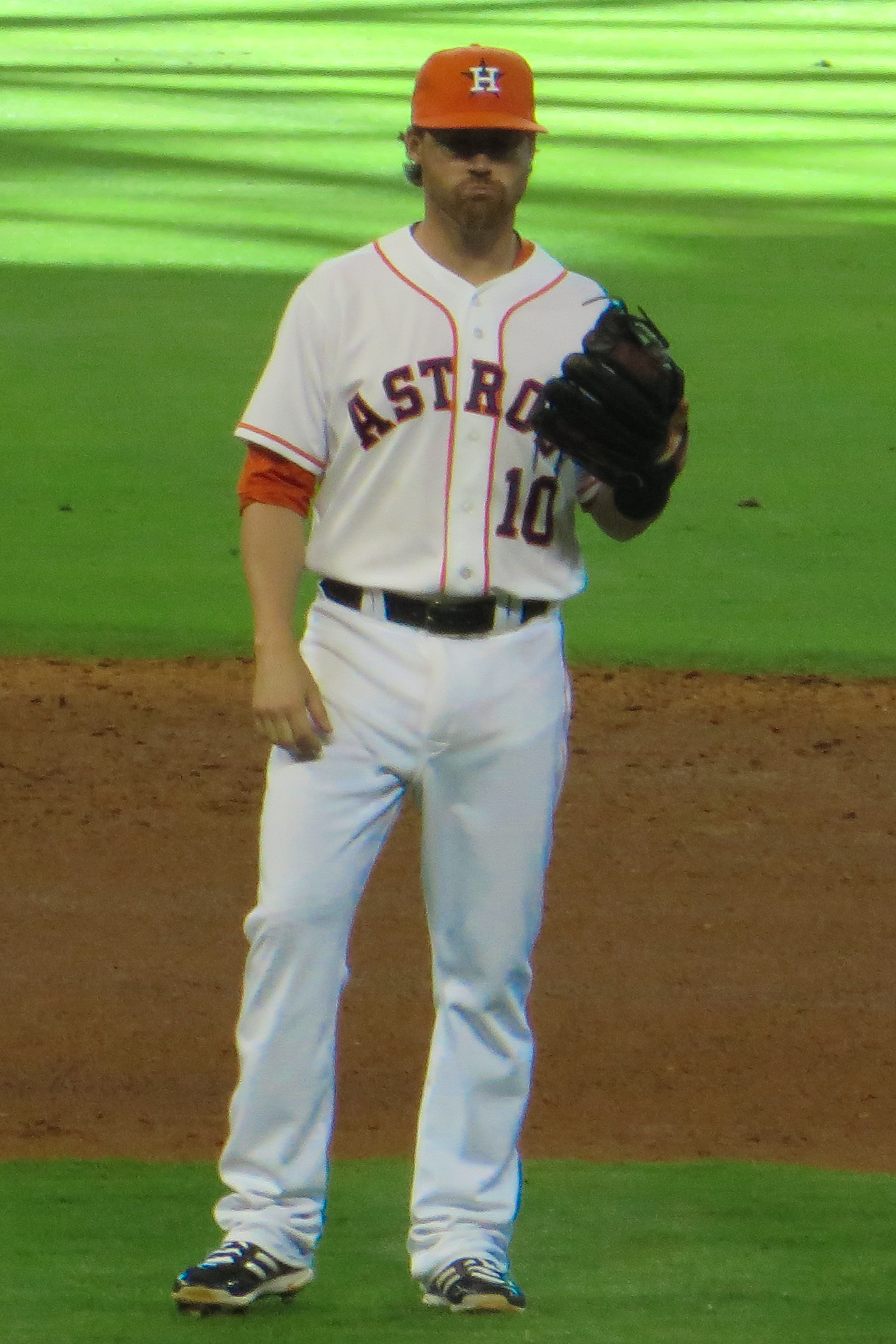
Elmore with the Houston Astros in 2013.

On November 1, 2012, Elmore was claimed off waivers by the Houston Astros. He began the 2013 season with the Triple-A Oklahoma City RedHawks of the Pacific Coast League. He was recalled by the Astros on June 25.

On August 19, 2013, Elmore became the 14th player in MLB history to catch and pitch in the same game. After replacing Carlos Corporan as the catcher in the fourth inning of a game against the Texas Rangers, Elmore was again called upon in the eighth inning, but this time to pitch. He retired the Rangers in order on 11 pitches. Commenting on the feat, manager Bo Porter said, "Elmore should probably be in the icetub, icing every part of his body."

=== Chicago White Sox ===
On November 20, 2013, Elmore was claimed off waivers by the Chicago White Sox. The White Sox designated Elmore for assignment on February 26, 2014.

=== Oakland Athletics ===
Elmore was traded to the Oakland Athletics on February 27, 2014. Elmore was then optioned to the Triple-A Sacramento River Cats and spent the first two and a half months of the 2014 season on the DL due to a strained left quadriceps. Oakland designated Elmore for assignment on July 31, 2014.

=== Cincinnati Reds ===
On August 2, 2014, Elmore was claimed off waivers by the Cincinnati Reds, and sent to the Triple-A Louisville Bats. On November 5, 2014, the Reds re-signed Elmore after outrighting him to Louisville on November 3.

=== Tampa Bay Rays ===
On November 7, 2014, Elmore was claimed off waivers by the Pittsburgh Pirates from the Reds. The Pirates designated him for assignment on January 20, 2015. He declined his outright assignment, became a free agent, and subsequently signed a minor league deal with the Tampa Bay Rays on February 9, 2015. Elmore was called up to the Rays on April 22 due to injuries. He split the year between the Triple-A Durham Bulls and Tampa Bay, slashing .206/.263/.284 with 4 RBI in 51 major league games. On November 6, 2015, he was outrighted off of the 40-man roster and elected free agency.

=== Milwaukee Brewers ===
On December 14, 2015, Elmore signed a minor league deal with the Milwaukee Brewers. The Brewers purchased his contract from the Colorado Springs Sky Sox on June 28, 2016, and Elmore made his first start for Milwaukee that day at second base. He appeared in 59 games for the Brewers, mostly as a pinch hitter. After hitting .218/.371/.244 on the season, Milwaukee chose to outright Elmore to Triple-A on October 28, 2016. Elmore rejected the assignment and opted for free agency.

=== Toronto Blue Jays ===
On February 9, 2017, Elmore signed a minor league contract with the Toronto Blue Jays that included an invitation to spring training. He was later assigned to the Triple-A Buffalo Bisons. In 94 games with Buffalo, Elmore batted .231/.321/.273 with 1 home run and 36 RBI.

=== Miami Marlins ===
On August 14, 2017, Elmore was traded to the Miami Marlins organization, and assigned to the Triple-A New Orleans Baby Cakes. In 16 games for New Orleans, Elmore went 14-for-52 with 5 RBI. He elected free agency following the season on November 6.

=== Chicago White Sox (second stint) ===
On February 8, 2018, Elmore signed a minor league contract with the Chicago White Sox organization. He spent the season with the Triple-A Charlotte Knights, posting a .289/.397/.359 slash line with one home run and 27 RBI in 101 games. Elmore elected free agency following the season on November 2. Elmore re-signed with the White Sox on a new minor league deal on January 14, 2019.

=== Pittsburgh Pirates ===
Elmore was traded to the Pittsburgh Pirates on March 28, 2019, and was assigned to the Triple-A Indianapolis Indians. His contract was selected by the Pirates on May 13. After going 1-for-20 at the plate in just under two weeks with the Pirates, Elmore was designated for assignment on May 26. He cleared waivers and was outrighted back to Triple-A three days later. On September 17, the Pirates selected Elmore's contract, adding him to their active roster. He hit .345 after being recalled. On October 25, Elmore was removed from the 40-man roster and sent outright to Indianapolis. He elected free agency on October 31.

Elmore re-signed with the Pirates organization during the offseason but was released by the team on June 9, 2020, amid the cancellation of the minor league season as a result of the COVID-19 pandemic.

=== Cleveland Indians ===
On July 3, 2020, Elmore signed a minor league deal with the Cleveland Indians organization. He spent time at the alternate training site that was set up because of the COVID-19 pandemic. The Indians released Elmore on September 4.

=== Philadelphia Phillies ===
On June 13, 2021, Elmore signed a minor league contract with the Philadelphia Phillies organization. Elmore appeared in 15 games for the Triple-A Lehigh Valley IronPigs, hitting .225 with no home runs and nine RBI. On August 24, Elmore was released by the Phillies.

== Post-playing career ==
On February 22, 2022, Elmore was hired by the Philadelphia Phillies organization to serve as the hitting coach for the club's Low-A affiliate, the Clearwater Threshers.
