= Daniel Corcino =

Dominican baseball player (born 1990)

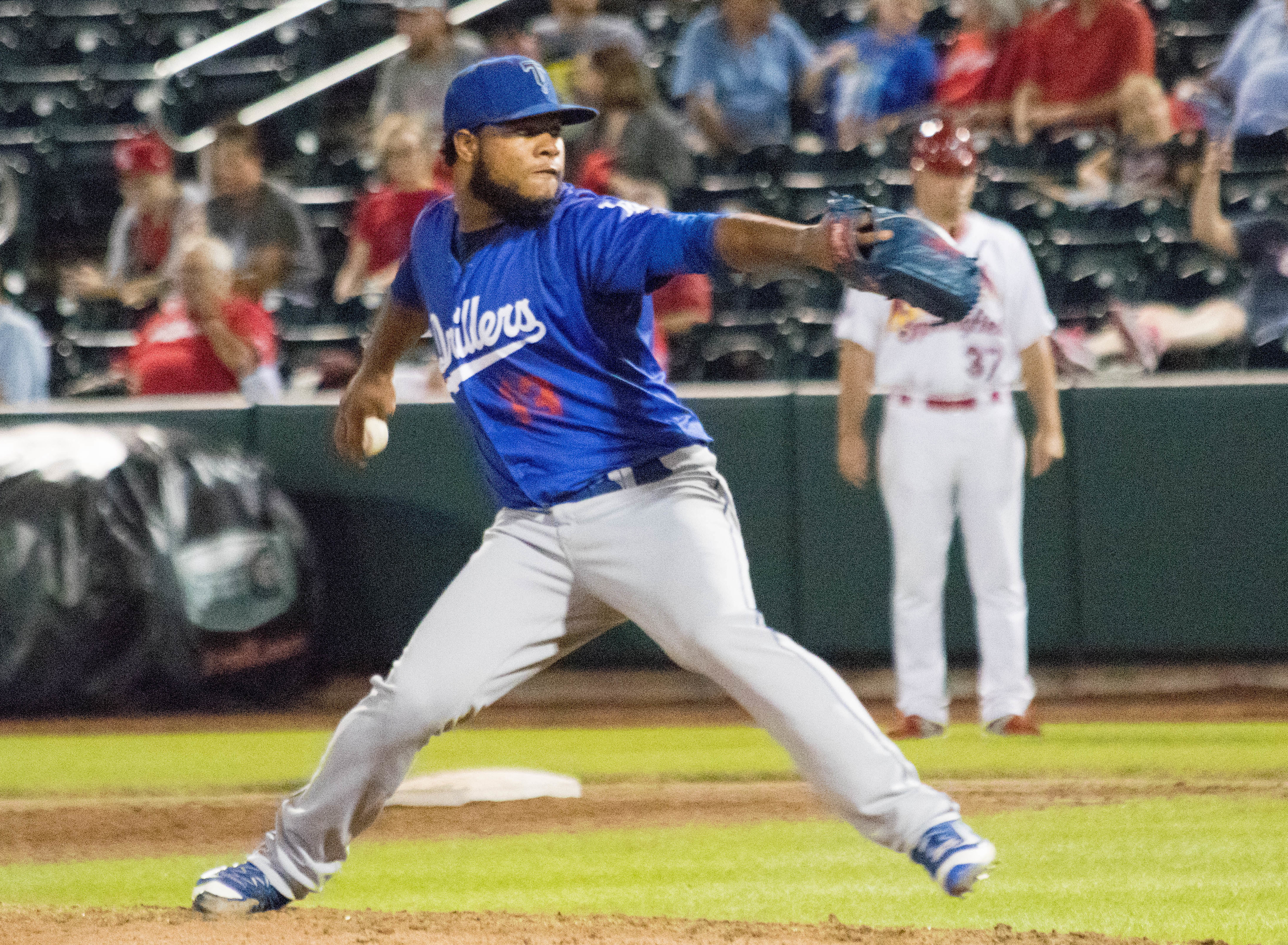
- Corcino with the Tulsa Drillers in 2016

Free agent
- Pitcher
- Born: August 26, 1990 (age 36); Azua de Compostela, Azua, Dominican Republic
- Bats: Right Throws: Right

Professional debut
- MLB: August 26, 2014, for the Cincinnati Reds
- CPBL: October 31, 2021, for the Wei Chuan Dragons

MLB statistics (through 2018 season)
- Win–loss record: 0–2
- Earned run average: 3.97
- Strikeouts: 16

CPBL statistics (through 2021 season)
- Win–loss record: 2–1
- Earned run average: 3.12
- Strikeouts: 10
- Stats at Baseball Reference

Teams
- Cincinnati Reds (2014); Los Angeles Dodgers (2018); Wei Chuan Dragons (2021)

Daniel Corcino (born August 26, 1990) is a Dominican Republic professional baseball pitcher who is a free agent. He has previously played in Major League Baseball (MLB) for the Cincinnati Reds and Los Angeles Dodgers, and in the Chinese Professional Baseball League (CPBL) for the Wei Chuan Dragons.

== Professional career ==
=== Cincinnati Reds ===
Corcino was signed by the Cincinnati Reds as an amateur free agent on January 11, 2008, and began his career in the Dominican Summer League, pitching in 23 games to a 6–2 record and 5.29 ERA in 34 innings. He converted to a starter in 2010, splitting that season between the Single A and Double A levels. 2011 was Corcino's first full season as a starter. He pitched 139 1/3 innings with a 3.42 ERA. Prior to the 2012 season, Keith Law of ESPN.com rated Corcino in the top 100 prospects in baseball. On June 17, 2012, Corcino along with Wilkin De La Rosa, threw the first no-hitter in the history of the Reds' Double A team, the Pensacola Blue Wahoos. He was added to the 40-man roster on November 20, 2012. In the 2013 season at Triple A, Corcino threw 129 innings, recording a 5.86 ERA.

Corcino was called up to the Reds for the first time on August 22, 2014. The Reds optioned Corcino back to the Triple–A Louisville Bats on August 28, 2014, two days after he made his Major League debut, throwing a scoreless ninth inning in a 3–0 loss to the Chicago Cubs. He finished the season with a 4.34 ERA in five games. Corcino was designated for assignment by the Reds on April 13, 2015.

=== Los Angeles Dodgers ===
Corcino was claimed off waivers by the Los Angeles Dodgers on April 17, 2015 and was later designated for assignment by them on April 22. He cleared waivers and was sent outright to Triple-A Gwinnett on April 25.

Daniel appeared in only three games in the Dodgers' system that season, two as a starter, for the Double-A Tulsa Drillers before spending the rest of the season on the disabled list. He returned to Tulsa for 2016 and managed to stay healthy for the entire season. He appeared in 27 games with a 4.04 ERA and 31 strikeouts. Corcino elected free agency following the season on November 7, 2016.

=== Chicago Cubs ===
On December 13, 2016, Corcino signed a minor league contract with the Chicago Cubs. In 5 appearances for the Double-A Tennessee Smokies, he struggled to an 8.68 ERA with 11 strikeouts across 9 1/3 innings pitched. Corcino was released by the Cubs organization on April 22, 2017.

=== Los Angeles Dodgers (second stint) ===
On May 9, 2017, Corcino signed a minor league contract with the Los Angeles Dodgers. He appeared in four games for the Double–A Tulsa Drillers and 14 games for the High–A Rancho Cucamonga Quakes. He was assigned to Triple–A Oklahoma City Dodgers for the 2018 season and had his contract purchased by the Los Angeles Dodgers on June 9, when he was called back up to the majors. He allowed one earned run in four innings over two games with the Dodgers before returning to the minors. He was designated for assignment on July 4. He remained in the minors the rest of the season, making 19 starts out of 28 total appearances with a 3.41 ERA.

In 2019, Corcino pitched in 24 games (21 starts) for Oklahoma City, recording an 8–8 record and 4.90 ERA with 105 strikeouts. He elected free agency following the season on November 4, 2019. On January 21, 2020, Corcino re–signed with the Dodgers organization on a minor league contract. He did not play in a game in 2020 due to the cancellation of the minor league season because of the COVID-19 pandemic. Corcino was released by the Dodgers organization on June 30.

=== Wei Chuan Dragons ===
On February 16, 2021, Corcino signed with the Mariachis de Guadalajara of the Mexican League. However, on May 29, Corcino agreed to terms on a contract with the Wei Chuan Dragons of the Chinese Professional Baseball League. He was not re-signed for the 2022 season and became a free agent.

=== Lexington Legends ===
On April 20, 2022, Corcino signed with the Lexington Legends of the Atlantic League of Professional Baseball. In 24 starts for the Legends, he compiled a 6–11 record and 6.53 ERA with 84 strikeouts across 121 1/3 innings pitched. Corcino became a free agent following the season.

=== Guerreros de Oaxaca ===
On June 23, 2023, Corcino signed with the Guerreros de Oaxaca of the Mexican League. In one relief appearance, Corcino allowed 3 earned runs in 2/3 of an inning. He was released on June 25.

=== Lexington Counter Clocks ===
On July 13, 2023, Corcino signed with the Lexington Counter Clocks of the Atlantic League of Professional Baseball. In 9 games (8 starts) for Lexington, Corcino logged a 1–5 record and 4.91 ERA with 26 strikeouts across 40 1/3 innings pitched.

=== Long Island Ducks ===
On April 10, 2024, Corcino signed with the Long Island Ducks of the Atlantic League of Professional Baseball. In 23 games (20 starts) for the Ducks, he struggled to a 6–9 record and 6.07 ERA with 74 strikeouts across 105 1/3 innings pitched. Corcino became a free agent following the season.

=== Hagerstown Flying Boxcars ===
On April 16, 2025, Corcino signed with the Hagerstown Flying Boxcars of the Atlantic League of Professional Baseball. In six starts for Hagerstown, he struggled to a 1–4 record and 10.58 ERA with 17 strikeouts across 24 2/3 innings pitched. Corcino was released by the team on June 2.
