= 2014 Miami Marlins season =

2014 Miami Marlins
- League: National League
- Division: East
- Ballpark: Marlins Park
- City: Miami, Florida
- Record: 77–85 (.475)
- Divisional place: 4th
- Owners: Jeffrey Loria
- President of baseball operations: Michael Hill
- General managers: Dan Jennings
- Managers: Mike Redmond
- Television: Fox Sports Florida; Sun Sports (English: Rich Waltz, Tommy Hutton, Craig Minervini, Frank Forte, Allison Williams) (Spanish: Raul Striker Jr., Cookie Rojas)
- Radio: Miami Marlins Radio Network (English) (Dave Van Horne, Glenn Geffner); WAQI (Spanish) (Felo Ramírez, Luis Quintana)

The Miami Marlins' 2014 season was the 22nd season for the Major League Baseball franchise, and the third as the "Miami" Marlins. They finished 77–85, 19 games back in third place in the division. They failed to make the playoffs for the 11th consecutive season.

== Spring training ==
The Marlins had an 18–12 win–loss record in spring training, their .600 winning percentage being the joint-best (along with Pittsburgh) among National League teams in pre-season. One of their games against the Atlanta Braves ended in a 6–6 tie and was therefore not included in the standings.

== Season standings ==
=== National League East ===
NL East
Team	W	L	Pct.	GB	Home	Road
Washington Nationals	96	66	.593	—	51‍–‍30	45‍–‍36
Atlanta Braves	79	83	.488	17	42‍–‍39	37‍–‍44
New York Mets	79	83	.488	17	40‍–‍41	39‍–‍42
Miami Marlins	77	85	.475	19	42‍–‍39	35‍–‍46
Philadelphia Phillies	73	89	.451	23	37‍–‍44	36‍–‍45

=== National League Wild Card ===
Division leaders
Team	W	L	Pct.
Washington Nationals	96	66	.593
Los Angeles Dodgers	94	68	.580
St. Louis Cardinals	90	72	.556

Wild Card teams (Top 2 teams qualify for postseason)
Team	W	L	Pct.	GB
Pittsburgh Pirates	88	74	.543	—
San Francisco Giants	88	74	.543	—
Milwaukee Brewers	82	80	.506	6
New York Mets	79	83	.488	9
Atlanta Braves	79	83	.488	9
Miami Marlins	77	85	.475	11
San Diego Padres	77	85	.475	11
Cincinnati Reds	76	86	.469	12
Philadelphia Phillies	73	89	.451	15
Chicago Cubs	73	89	.451	15
Colorado Rockies	66	96	.407	22
Arizona Diamondbacks	64	98	.395	24

== Record vs. opponents ==
2014 National League record Source: MLB Standings Grid – 2014
Team	AZ	ATL	CHC	CIN	COL	LAD	MIA	MIL	NYM	PHI	PIT	SD	SF	STL	WSH	AL
Arizona	–	3–3	5–2	3–4	9–10	4–15	3–4	3–4	2–4	2–4	3–4	12–7	6–13	1–5	1–6	7–13
Atlanta	3–3	–	5–1	5–2	4–3	1–6	9–10	5–2	9–10	11–8	3–4	3–4	1–5	2–4	11–8	7–13
Chicago	2–5	1–5	–	8–11	5–2	3–4	4–2	11–8	5–2	3–3	5–14	3–4	2–4	9–10	3–4	9–11
Cincinnati	4–3	2–5	11–8	–	3–4	3–4	4–3	10–9	2–4	3–3	12–7	1–5	5–2	7–12	3–3	6–14
Colorado	10–9	3–4	2–5	4–3	–	6–13	3–4	1–6	3–4	3–3	2–4	10–9	10–9	1–5	1–5	7–13
Los Angeles	15–4	6–1	4–3	4–3	13–6	–	3–3	1–5	4–2	3–4	2–5	12–7	10–9	4–3	2–4	11–9
Miami	4–3	10–9	2–4	3–4	4–3	3–3	–	3–4	8–11	9–10	2–4	3–4	3–4	4–2	6–13	13–7
Milwaukee	4–3	2–5	8–11	9–10	6–1	5–1	4–3	–	4–3	3–4	12–7	3–3	2–4	7–12	2–4	11–9
New York	4–2	10–9	2–5	4–2	4–3	2–4	11–8	3–4	–	13–6	3–4	3–3	1–6	4–3	4–15	11–9
Philadelphia	4–2	8–11	3–3	3–3	3–3	4–3	10–9	4–3	6–13	–	1–6	4–3	2–5	4–3	10–9	7–13
Pittsburgh	4–3	4–3	14–5	7–12	4–2	5–2	4–2	7–12	4–3	6–1	–	3–3	4–2	8–11	3–4	11–9
San Diego	7–12	4–3	4–3	5–1	9–10	7–12	4–3	3–3	3–3	3–4	3–3	–	10–9	3–4	3–4	9–11
San Francisco	13–6	5–1	4–2	2–5	9–10	9–10	4–3	4–2	6–1	5–2	2–4	9–10	–	4–3	2–5	10–10
St. Louis	5–1	4–2	10–9	12–7	5–1	3–4	2–4	12–7	3–4	3–4	11–8	4–3	3–4	–	5–2	8–12
Washington	6–1	8–11	4–3	3–3	5–1	4–2	13–6	4–2	15–4	9–10	4–3	4–3	5–2	2–5	–	10–10

== Detailed records ==
(updated through June 1)

National League
Opponent	Home	Away	Total	Pct.	Runs scored	Runs allowed
NL East
Miami Marlins	—	—	—	—	—	—
Atlanta Braves	3-3	1-2	4-5	.444	36	30
Washington Nationals	1-2	2-3	3-5	.375	25	46
New York Mets	3-0	1-2	4-2	.667	18	17
Philadelphia Phillies	2-1	0-3	2-4	.333	33	29
	9-6	4-10	13-16	.448	112	122
NL Central
Milwaukee Brewers	1-2	0-0	1-2	.333	8	17
St. Louis Cardinals	0-0	0-0	0-0	–	0	0
Pittsburgh Pirates	0-0	0-0	0-0	–	0	0
Cincinnati Reds	0-0	0-0	0-0	–	0	0
Chicago Cubs	0-0	0-0	0-0	–	0	0
	1-2	0-0	1-2	.333	8	17
NL West
San Francisco Giants	0-0	2-2	2-2	.500	17	15
Los Angeles Dodgers	2-1	1-2	3-3	.500	37	32
Colorado Rockies	3-1	0-0	3-1	.750	27	15
San Diego Padres	2-1	1-3	3-4	.429	31	31
Arizona Diamondbacks	0-0	0-0	0-0	–	0	0
	7-3	2-5	9-8	.529	112	93

American League
Opponent	Home	Away	Total	Pct.	Runs scored	Runs allowed
Seattle Mariners	3-0	0-0	3-0	1.000	18	6
Tampa Bay Rays	0-0	0-0	0-0	–	0	0
Texas Rangers	0-0	0-0	0-0	–	0	0
Oakland Athletics	0-0	0-0	0-0	–	0	0
Houston Astros	0-0	0-0	0-0	–	0	0
Los Angeles Angels	0-0	0-0	0-0	–	0	0
	3-0	0-0	3-0	1.000	18	6

== Game log ==
Legend
	Marlins win
	Marlins loss
	Postponement
**Bold**	Marlins team member

2014 game log (77–85)
March: 1–0 (Home: 1–0; Away: 0–0 )

#	Date	Opponent	Score	Win	Loss	Save	Attendance	Record
1	March 31	Rockies	10–1	**Fernández** (1–0)	de la Rosa (0–1)	—	37,116	1–0

April: 12–14 (Home: 10–4; Away: 2–10 )

#	Date	Opponent	Score	Win	Loss	Save	Attendance	Record
2	April 1	Rockies	4–3	**Eovaldi** (1–0)	Anderson (0–1)	**Cishek** (1)	15,906	2–0
3	April 2	Rockies	5–6	Lyles (1–0)	**Álvarez** (0–1)	Hawkins (1)	15,866	2–1
4	April 3	Rockies	8–5	**Ramos** (1–0)	Belisle (0–1)	**Cishek** (2)	15,378	3–1
5	April 4	Padres	8–2	**Koehler** (1–0)	Stults (0–1)	**Hand** (1)	17,783	4–1
6	April 5	Padres	5–0	**Fernández** (2–0)	Cashner (0–1)	—	35,188	5–1
7	April 6	Padres	2–4	Kennedy (1–1)	**Eovaldi** (1–1)	Street (2)	22,496	5–2
8	April 8	@ Nationals	0–5	González (2–0)	**Álvarez** (0–2)	—	21,728	5–3
9	April 9	@ Nationals	7–10	Clippard (1–1)	**Mármol** (0–1)	Soriano (2)	21,190	5–4
10	April 10	@ Nationals	1–7	Strasburg (1–1)	**Koehler** (1–1)	—	20,869	5–5
11	April 11	@ Phillies	3–6	Diekman (1–0)	**Fernández** (2–1)	Papelbon (2)	22,283	5–6
12	April 12	@ Phillies	4–5 (10)	Rosenberg (1–0)	**Jennings** (0–1)	—	27,760	5–7
13	April 13	@ Phillies	3–4	Bastardo (1–1)	**Dunn** (0–1)	Papelbon (3)	34,272	5–8
14	April 14	Nationals	2–9	Zimmermann (1–0)	**Hand** (0–1)	—	18,788	5–9
15	April 15	Nationals	11–2	**Koehler** (2–1)	Strasburg (1–2)	—	19,931	6–9
16	April 16	Nationals	3–6	Storen (1–0)	**Dunn** (0–2)	Soriano (3)	20,178	6–10
17	April 18	Mariners	8–4	**Cishek** (1–0)	Medina (0–1)	—	21,388	7–10
18	April 19	Mariners	7–0	**Álvarez** (1–2)	Elías (1–2)	—	24,003	8–10
19	April 20	Mariners	3–2	**Dunn** (1–2)	Wilhelmsen (0–1)	**Cishek** (3)	20,228	9–10
20	April 21	@ Braves	2–4 (10)	Varvaro (1–0)	**Caminero** (0–1)	—	16,055	9–11
21	April 22	@ Braves	1–0	**Fernández** (3–1)	Wood (2–3)	**Cishek** (4)	18,275	10–11
22	April 23	@ Braves	1–3	Carpenter (1–0)	**Dunn** (1–3)	Kimbrel (6)	21,508	10–12
23	April 25	@ Mets	3–4	Familia (1–2)	**Cishek** (1–1)	—	21,171	10–13
24	April 26	@ Mets	7–6 (10)	**Dunn** (2–3)	Farnsworth (0–1)	**Cishek** (5)	21,492	11–13
25	April 27	@ Mets	0–4	Gee (2–1)	**Koehler** (2–2)	—	26,861	11–14
26	April 29	Braves	9–0	**Fernández** (4–1)	Wood (2–4)	—	21,992	12–14
27	April 30	Braves	9–3	**Eovaldi** (2–1)	Harang (3–2)	—	15,558	13–14

May: 15–13 (Home: 9–6; Away: 6–7 )

#	Date	Opponent	Score	Win	Loss	Save	Attendance	Record
28	May 1	Braves	5–4	**Dunn** (3–3)	Thomas (1–1)	**Cishek** (6)	17,836	14–14
29	May 2	Dodgers	6–3	**Koehler** (3–2)	Beckett (0–1)	—	20,722	15–14
30	May 3	Dodgers	7–9 (11)	League (1–1)	**Mármol** (0–2)	—	24,104	15–15
31	May 4	Dodgers	5–4	**Ramos** (2–0)	Wright (2–2)	—	30,145	16–15
32	May 5	Mets	4–3	**Cishek** (2–1)	Rice (0–1)	—	20,606	17–15
33	May 6	Mets	3–0	**Álvarez** (2–2)	Colón (2–5)	—	18,315	18–15
34	May 7	Mets	1–0	**Cishek** (3–1)	Torres (2–1)	—	18,010	19–15
35	May 8	@ Padres	3–1 (11)	**Ramos** (3–0)	Thayer (2–1)	**Cishek** (7)	17,832	20–15
36	May 9	@ Padres	1–10	Ross (4–3)	**Fernández** (4–2)	—	22,553	20–16
37	May 10	@ Padres	3–9	Stults (2–3)	**Mármol** (0–3)	—	27,719	20–17
38	May 11	@ Padres	4–5	Erlin (2–4)	**Álvarez** (2–3)	Street (11)	17,682	20–18
39	May 12	@ Dodgers	5–6	Haren (5–1)	**Koehler** (3–3)	Jansen (12)	37,187	20–19
40	May 13	@ Dodgers	1–7	Beckett (1–1)	**Turner** (0–1)	—	50,349	20–20
41	May 14	@ Dodgers	13–3	**DeSclafani** (1–0)	Maholm (1–4)	**Wolf** (1)	39,498	21–20
42	May 15	@ Giants	4–6	Cain (1–3)	**Eovaldi** (2–2)	Romo (14)	41,597	21–21
43	May 16	@ Giants	7–5	**Dunn** (4–3)	Casilla (1–1)	**Cishek** (8)	41,819	22–21
44	May 17	@ Giants	5–0	**Koehler** (4–3)	Lincecum (3–3)	**Cishek** (9)	41,619	23–21
45	May 18	@ Giants	1–4	Vogelsong (2–2)	**Turner** (0–2)	Romo (15)	41,551	23–22
46	May 20	Phillies	5–6	Burnett (3–3)	**DeSclafani** (1–1)	Papelbon (12)	18,699	23–23
47	May 21	Phillies	14–5	**Eovaldi** (3–2)	Kendrick (0–5)	—	18,257	24–23
48	May 22	Phillies	4–3	**Cishek** (4–1)	Diekman (2–2)	—	25,507	25–23
49	May 23	Brewers	5–9	Estrada (4–2)	**Koehler** (4–4)	—	18,989	25–24
50	May 24	Brewers	2–1	**Turner** (1–2)	Peralta (4–4)	**Cishek** (10)	25,819	26–24
51	May 25	Brewers	1–7	Nelson (1–0)	**Wolf** (0–1)	—	21,897	26–25
52	May 26	@ Nationals	3–2	**Eovaldi** (4–2)	Roark (3–3)	**Cishek** (11)	33,677	27–25
–	May 27	@ Nationals	Postponed (rain) Rescheduled for September 26					
53	May 28	@ Nationals	8–5 (10)	**Slowey** (1–0)	Blevins (2–2)	–	24,830	28–25
54	May 30	Braves	2–3	Teherán (5–3)	**Koehler** (4–5)	Kimbrel (14)	18,469	28–26
55	May 31	Braves	5–9	Santana (5–2)	**Turner** (1–3)	Kimbrel (15)	26,875	28–27

June: 11–16 (Home: 5–11; Away: 6–5 )

#	Date	Opponent	Score	Win	Loss	Save	Attendance	Record
56	June 1	Braves	2–4	Wood (6–5)	**Cishek** (4–2)	Simmons (1)	21,997	28–28
57	June 2	Rays	3–1	**Wolf** (1–1)	Cobb (1–3)	**Cishek** (12)	18,155	29–28
58	June 3	Rays	1–0	**Álvarez** (3–3)	Archer (3–3)	—	21,303	30–28
59	June 4	@ Rays	5–4	**Koehler** (5–5)	Price (4–5)	**Cishek** (13)	10,897	31–28
60	June 5	@ Rays	11–6	**Turner** (2–3)	Odorizzi (2–6)	—	10,442	32–28
61	June 6	@ Cubs	3–5 (13)	Villanueva (2–5)	**Slowey** (1–1)	—	28,495	32–29
62	June 7	@ Cubs	2–5	Samardzija (2–5)	**Wolf** (1–2)	Strop (2)	33,786	32–30
63	June 8	@ Cubs	4–3	**Dunn** (5–3)	Strop (0–3)	**Cishek** (14)	33,134	33–30
64	June 10	@ Rangers	8–5	**Morris** (5–0)	Frasor (1–1)	**Cishek** (15)	28,845	34–30
65	June 11	@ Rangers	0–6	Darvish (7–2)	**Turner** (2–4)	—	31,512	34–31
66	June 13	Pirates	6–8 (13)	Gómez (1–2)	**Dunn** (5–4)	—	19,054	34–32
67	June 14	Pirates	6–8	Morton (4–7)	**Wolf** (1–3)	Grilli (11)	21,195	34–33
68	June 15	Pirates	3–2 (10)	**Ramos** (4–0)	Hughes (3–2)	—	25,953	35–33
69	June 16	Cubs	4–5	Villanueva (3–5)	**Turner** (2–5)	Russell (1)	19,170	35–34
70	June 17	Cubs	6–5	**Dyson** (1–0)	Schlitter (2–2)	**Cishek** (16)	20,860	36–34
71	June 18	Cubs	1–6	Arrieta (3–1)	**Eovaldi** (4–3)	—	27,032	36–35
72	June 19	Mets	0–1	Wheeler (3–7)	**Heaney** (0–1)	—	20,334	36–36
73	June 20	Mets	3–2	**Álvarez** (4–3)	Matsuzaka (3–1)	**Cishek** (17)	19,725	37–36
74	June 21	Mets	0–4	deGrom (1–4)	**Koehler** (5–6)	—	24,502	37–37
75	June 22	Mets	5–11	Niese (4–4)	**DeSclafani** (1–2)	—	24,613	37–38
76	June 23	@ Phillies	4–0	**Eovaldi** (5–3)	Hernández (3–6)	—	32,161	38–38
77	June 24	@ Phillies	4–7	Buchanan (4–3)	**Heaney** (0–2)	Papelbon (18)	24,860	38–39
78	June 25	@ Phillies	3–2	**Álvarez** (5–3)	Burnett (5–7)	**Cishek** (18)	23,360	39–39
79	June 26	@ Phillies	3–5 (14)	De Fratus (2–0)	**Hatcher** (0–1)	—	34,168	39–40
80	June 27	Athletics	5–9	Gregerson (2–1)	**Cishek** (4–3)	—	18,666	39–41
81	June 28	Athletics	6–7 (14)	Johnson (4–2)	**Turner** (2–6)	Francis (1)	19,358	39–42
82	June 29	Athletics	3–4	Milone (6–3)	**Heaney** (0–3)	Cook (1)	21,917	39–43

July: 14–12 (Home: 5–5; Away: 9–7 )

#	Date	Opponent	Score	Win	Loss	Save	Attendance	Record
83	July 1	Phillies	5–4 (11)	**Morris** (6–0)	De Fratus (2–1)	—	18,518	40–43
84	July 2	Phillies	5–0	**Koehler** (6–6)	Hamels (2–5)	—	20,084	41–43
85	July 3	Phillies	4–5	Diekman (3–2)	**Cishek** (4–4)	Papelbon (19)	24,915	41–44
86	July 4	@ Cardinals	2–3	Lynn (9–6)	**Eovaldi** (5–4)	Rosenthal (26)	46,131	41–45
87	July 5	@ Cardinals	6–5	**Dunn** (6–4)	Rosenthal (0–4)	**Cishek** (19)	45,445	42–45
88	July 6	@ Cardinals	8–4	**Álvarez** (6–3)	Gonzales (0–2)	—	42,160	43–45
98	July 7	@ Diamondbacks	1–9	Anderson (6–4)	**Koehler** (6–7)	—	17,103	43–46
90	July 8	@ Diamondbacks	2–1	**Dunn** (7–4)	Reed (1–5)	**Cishek** (20)	18,319	44–46
91	July 9	@ Diamondbacks	3–4 (10)	Ziegler (4–1)	**Cishek** (4–5)	—	18,268	44–47
92	July 11	@ Mets	1–7	Wheeler (5–8)	**Álvarez** (6–4)	—	25,914	44–48
93	July 12	@ Mets	4–5	Black (2–2)	**Dunn** (7–5)	Mejía (10)	35,283	44–49
94	July 13	@ Mets	1–9	deGrom (3–5)	**Hand** (0–2)	—	28,187	44–50
**All–Star Break (July 14–17)**
95	July 18	Giants	1–9	Bumgarner (11–7)	**Eovaldi** (5–5)	—	23,017	44–51
96	July 19	Giants	3–5	Hudson (8–6)	**Álvarez** (6–5)	Casilla (5)	24,882	44–52
97	July 20	Giants	3–2	**Hand** (1–2)	Lincecum (9–6)	**Cishek** (21)	25,221	45–52
98	July 21	@ Braves	3–1 (10)	**Morris** (7–0)	Simmons (1–2)	**Cishek** (22)	26,766	46–52
99	July 22	@ Braves	6–5	**Turner** (3–6)	Minor (3–6)	**Cishek** (23)	22,998	47–52
100	July 23	@ Braves	1–6	Santana (9–6)	**Eovaldi** (5–6)	—	20,102	47–53
101	July 24	@ Braves	3–2	**Álvarez** (7–5)	Kimbrel (0–2)	**Cishek** (24)	26,446	48–53
102	July 25	@ Astros	2–0	**Hand** (2–2)	Keuchel (9–7)	**Cishek** (25)	23,132	49–53
103	July 26	@ Astros	7–3	**Koehler** (7–7)	Cosart (9–7)	—	28,968	50–53
104	July 27	@ Astros	4–2	**Turner** (4–6)	McHugh (4–9)	**Cishek** (26)	17,858	51–53
105	July 28	Nationals	7–6	**Dunn** (8–5)	Soriano (2–1)	—	20,027	52–53
106	July 29	Nationals	3–0	**Álvarez** (8–5)	Strasburg (7–9)	**Cishek** (27)	22,672	53–53
107	July 30	Nationals	3–4	Roark (11–6)	**Hand** (2–3)	Storen (1)	26,319	53–54
108	July 31	Reds	1–3	Cueto (12–6)	**Koehler** (7–8)	Chapman (24)	18,056	53–55

August: 13–14 (Home: 7–5; Away: 6–9 )

#	Date	Opponent	Score	Win	Loss	Save	Attendance	Record
109	August 1	Reds	2–5	Latos (3–3)	**Cosart** (9–8)	Chapman (25)	20,410	53–56
110	August 2	Reds	2–1 (10)	**Dunn** (9–5)	LeCure (1–3)	—	25,159	54–56
111	August 3	Reds	3–7	Leake (9–9)	**Turner** (4–7)	—	26,707	54–57
112	August 5	@ Pirates	6–3	**Ramos** (5–0)	Hughes (6–3)	—	26,734	55–57
113	August 6	@ Pirates	3–7	Locke (3–3)	**Koehler** (7–9)	—	26,976	55–58
114	August 7	@ Pirates	2–7	Vólquez (9–7)	**Flynn** (0–1)	—	29,035	55–59
115	August 8	@ Reds	2–1	**Eovaldi** (6–6)	Leake (9–10)	**Cishek** (28)	31,193	56–59
116	August 9	@ Reds	4–3	**Penny** (1–0)	LeCure (1–4)	**Cishek** (29)	34,768	57–59
117	August 10	@ Reds	2–7	Cueto (14–6)	**Hand** (2–4)	—	36,122	57–60
118	August 11	Cardinals	6–5	**Koehler** (8–9)	Miller (8–9)	**Cishek** (30)	21,144	58–60
119	August 12	Cardinals	3–0	**Cosart** (10–8)	Wainwright (14–7)	**Dunn** (1)	22,703	59–60
120	August 13	Cardinals	2–5	Masterson (6–7)	**Eovaldi** (6–7)	—	20,044	59–61
121	August 14	Diamondbacks	5–4 (10)	**Dunn** (10–5)	Hagens (0–1)	—	17,074	60–61
122	August 15	Diamondbacks	2–3	Cahill (3–8)	**Hand** (2–5)	Reed (29)	18,286	60–62
123	August 16	Diamondbacks	2–1	**Álvarez** (9–5)	Miley (7–9)	**Cishek** (31)	19,563	61–62
124	August 17	Diamondbacks	10–3	**Koehler** (9–9)	Collmenter (8–7)	—	19,296	62–62
125	August 19	Rangers	4–3 (10)	**Dyson** (2–0)	Cotts (2–7)	—	20,277	63–62
126	August 20	Rangers	4–5	Martinez (3–9)	**Eovaldi** (6–8)	Feliz (5)	16,672	63–63
127	August 22	@ Rockies	13–5	**Álvarez** (10–5)	Morales (5–7)	—	30,674	64–63
128	August 23	@ Rockies	4–5 (13)	Belisle (4–6)	**Dyson** (2–1)	—	31,109	64–64
129	August 24	@ Rockies	4–7	Bergman (1–2)	**Hand** (2–6)	Hawkins (20)	40,509	64–65
130	August 25	@ Angels	7–1	**Cosart** (11–8)	LeBlanc (0–1)	—	35,350	65–65
131	August 26	@ Angels	2–8	Shoemaker (13–4)	**Eovaldi** (6–9)	—	33,028	65–66
132	August 27	@ Angels	1–6	Santiago (4–7)	**Álvarez** (10–6)	—	34,657	65–67
133	August 29	@ Braves	2–5	Carpenter (5–3)	**Hatcher** (0–2)	Kimbrel (40)	26,278	65–68
134	August 30	@ Braves	4–0	**Cosart** (12–8)	Harang (10–9)	—	25,335	66–68
135	August 31	@ Braves	0–1	Wood (10–10)	**Eovaldi** (6–10)	Kimbrel (41)	45,754	66–69

September: 11–16 (Home: 5–8; Away: 6–8)

#	Date	Opponent	Score	Win	Loss	Save	Attendance	Record
136	September 1	Mets	9–6	**Ramos** (6–0)	Familia (2–4)	**Cishek** (32)	23,090	67–69
137	September 2	Mets	6–8	Niese (8–10)	**Penny** (1–1)	Mejía (22)	17,745	67–70
138	September 3	Mets	3–4	Torres (6–5)	**Dunn** (10–6)	Mejía (23)	17,737	67–71
139	September 5	Braves	11–3	**Cosart** (13–8)	Harang (10–10)	—	19,951	68–71
140	September 6	Braves	3–4 (10)	Carpenter (6–3)	**Morris** (7–1)	Kimbrel (43)	25,485	68–72
141	September 7	Braves	4–0	**Hand** (3–6)	Teherán (13–11)	—	20,013	69–72
142	September 8	@ Brewers	6–4	**Penny** (2–1)	Gallardo (8–9)	**Cishek** (33)	31,203	70–72
143	September 9	@ Brewers	6–3	**Morris** (8–1)	Rodríguez (4–5)	**Cishek** (34)	29,590	71–72
144	September 10	@ Brewers	1–4	Peralta (16–10)	**Cosart** (13–9)	Rodríguez (40)	25,219	71–73
145	September 11	@ Brewers	2–4	Fiers (6–2)	**Eovaldi** (6–11)	Rodríguez (41)	34,028	71–74
146	September 12	@ Phillies	1–3 (10)	Diekman (5–4)	**Jennings** (0–2)	—	27,039	71–75
147	September 13	@ Phillies	1–2	Kendrick (9–12)	**Hand** (3–7)	Papelbon (37)	26,163	71–76
148	September 14	@ Phillies	5–4	**DeSclafani** (2–2)	Papelbon (2–3)	**Cishek** (35)	30,201	72–76
149	September 15	@ Mets	6–5	**Dyson** (3–1)	Familia (2–5)	**Cishek** (36)	23,027	73–76
150	September 16	@ Mets	1–9	Colón (14–12)	**Eovaldi** (6–12)	—	21,602	73–77
151	September 17	@ Mets	4–3	**Álvarez** (11–6)	Gee (7–8)	**Cishek** (37)	23,892	74–77
152	September 18	Nationals	2–6	González (9–10)	**Hand** (3–8)	—	18,010	74–78
153	September 19	Nationals	2–3	Fister (15–6)	**Koehler** (9–10)	Storen (8)	19,815	74–79
154	September 20	Nationals	2–3	Zimmermann (13–5)	**Cosart** (13–10)	Storen (9)	20,983	74–80
155	September 21	Nationals	1–2	Strasburg (13–11)	**Eovaldi** (6–13)	Soriano (32)	22,806	74–81
156	September 23	Phillies	2–0	**Álvarez** (12–6)	Hamels (9–8)	**Cishek** (38)	18,969	75–81
157	September 24	Phillies	1–2	Kendrick (10–13)	**Hatcher** (0–3)	Papelbon (38)	22,491	75–82
158	September 25	Phillies	6–4	**Koehler** (10–10)	Diekman (5–5)	**Cishek** (39)	24,259	76–82
159	September 26 (1)	@ Nationals	0–4	Fister (16–6)	**Cosart** (4–4)	—	27,920	76–83
160	September 26 (2)	@ Nationals	15–7	**Ramos** (7–0)	Hill (0–1)	—	34,190	77–83
161	September 27	@ Nationals	1–5	Strasburg (14–11)	**Eovaldi** (6–14)	—	37,529	77–84
162	September 28	@ Nationals	0–1	Zimmermann (14–5)	**Álvarez** (12–7)	—	35,085	77–85

Legend: = Win = Loss = Postponement
Bold = Marlins team member

== Roster ==
2014 Miami Marlins
Roster
Pitchers: 37 Henderson Álvarez; 26 Arquímedes Caminero; 22 Carter Capps; 31 Steve Cishek; 23 Jarred Cosart; 28 Anthony DeSclafani; 40 Mike Dunn; 36 Sam Dyson; 24 Nathan Eovaldi; 16 José Fernández; 35 Brian Flynn; 64 Kevin Gregg; 52 Brad Hand; 41 Chris Hatcher; 25 Andrew Heaney; 43 Dan Jennings; 34 Tom Koehler; 49 Carlos Mármol; 57 Bryan Morris; 33 Brad Penny; 44 A. J. Ramos; 63 Henry Rodríguez; 45 Kevin Slowey; 33 Jacob Turner; 29 Randy Wolf	Catchers: 6 Jeff Mathis; 60 J. T. Realmuto; 39 Jarrod Saltalamacchia; Infielders: 10 Jeff Baker; 48 Justin Bour; 32 Derek Dietrich; 15 Rafael Furcal; 3 Adeiny Hechavarria; 46 Garrett Jones; 59 Ed Lucas; 9 Casey McGehee; 17 Donovan Solano; 1 Jordany Valdespin	Outfielders: 12 Enrique Hernández; 5 Reed Johnson; 23 Jake Marisnick; 13 Marcell Ozuna; 27 Giancarlo Stanton; 21 Christian Yelich; Other batters: 29 Greg Dobbs	Manager: 11 Mike Redmond; Coaches: 38 Reid Cornelius (bullpen); 2 Brett Butler (third base); 55 Chuck Hernandez (pitching); 7 Perry Hill (first base); 14 Rob Leary (bench); 4 Frank Menechino (hitting); 72 Pat Shine (administrative coach); 75 Jeff Urgelles (bullpen catcher)

== 2014 player stats ==
Note: All batting and pitching leaders in each category are in bold.

All batting and pitching data updated through September 28, 2014.

=== Batting ===
Note: G = Games played; AB = At bats; R = Runs scored; H = Hits; 2B = Doubles; 3B = Triples; HR = Home runs; RBI = Runs batted in; AVG = Batting average; SB = Stolen bases

Player	G	AB	R	H	2B	3B	HR	RBI	AVG	SB
Jeff Baker	90	208	27	55	10	4	3	28	.264	1
Justin Bour	39	74	10	21	3	0	1	11	.284	0
Derek Dietrich	49	158	31	36	6	2	5	17	.228	1
Greg Dobbs	15	13	0	1	0	0	0	0	.077	0
Rafael Furcal	9	35	4	6	0	1	0	2	.171	0
Adeiny Hechavarria	146	536	53	148	20	**10**	1	34	.276	5
Enrique Hernández	18	40	3	7	2	1	2	6	.175	0
Reed Johnson	113	187	24	44	15	0	2	25	.235	0
Garrett Jones	146	496	59	122	**33**	2	15	53	.246	0
Ed Lucas	69	179	19	45	5	0	1	9	.251	1
Jake Marisnick	14	48	3	8	0	0	0	0	.167	5
Jeff Mathis	64	175	12	35	7	0	2	12	.200	0
Casey McGehee	**160**	**616**	56	**177**	29	1	4	76	.287	4
Marcell Ozuna	153	565	72	152	26	5	23	85	.269	3
J. T. Realmuto	11	29	4	7	1	1	0	9	.241	0
Jarrod Saltalamacchia	114	373	43	82	20	0	11	44	.220	0
Donovan Solano	111	310	26	78	11	1	3	28	.252	1
Giancarlo Stanton	145	539	89	155	31	1	**37**	**105**	**.288**	13
Jordany Valdespin	52	98	8	21	2	1	3	10	.214	1
Christian Yelich	144	582	**94**	165	30	6	9	54	.284	**21**
Pitcher Totals	162	277	8	34	3	0	0	6	.123	0
**Team totals**	**162**	**5538**	**645**	**1399**	**254**	**36**	**122**	**614**	**.253**	**58**

=== Pitching ===
Note: W = Wins; L = Losses; ERA = Earned run average; G = Games pitched; GS = Games started; SV = Saves; IP = Innings pitched; H = Hits allowed; R = Runs allowed; ER = Earned runs allowed; BB = Walks allowed; K = Strikeouts

Player	W	L	ERA	G	GS	SV	IP	H	R	ER	BB	K
Henderson Álvarez	**12**	7	**2.65**	30	30	0	187.0	198	65	55	33	111
Arquimedes Caminero	0	1	10.80	6	0	0	6.2	8	8	8	4	8
Carter Capps	0	0	3.48	17	0	0	20.1	19	9	9	5	25
Steve Cishek	4	5	3.17	67	0	**39**	65.1	58	26	23	21	84
Jarred Cosart	4	4	2.39	10	10	0	64.0	54	19	17	22	40
Anthony DeSclafani	2	2	6.27	13	5	0	33.0	40	23	23	5	26
Mike Dunn	10	6	3.16	**75**	0	1	57.0	47	25	20	22	67
Sam Dyson	3	1	2.14	31	0	0	42.0	41	14	10	15	33
Nathan Eovaldi	6	**14**	4.37	33	**33**	0	**199.2**	**223**	**107**	**97**	43	142
José Fernández	4	2	2.44	8	8	0	51.2	36	19	14	13	70
Brian Flynn	0	1	9.00	2	1	0	7.0	12	7	7	3	6
Kevin Gregg	0	0	10.00	12	0	0	9.0	11	10	10	5	6
Brad Hand	3	8	4.38	32	16	1	111.0	112	56	54	39	67
Chris Hatcher	0	3	3.38	52	0	0	56.0	55	22	21	12	60
Andrew Heaney	0	3	5.83	7	5	0	29.1	32	19	19	7	20
Dan Jennings	0	2	1.34	47	0	0	40.1	45	11	6	17	38
Tom Koehler	10	10	3.81	32	32	0	191.1	177	84	81	**71**	**153**
Carlos Mármol	0	3	8.10	15	0	0	13.1	16	12	12	10	14
Bryan Morris	4	1	0.66	39	0	0	40.2	33	6	3	12	36
Brad Penny	2	1	6.58	8	4	0	26.0	34	20	19	13	13
A.J. Ramos	7	0	2.11	68	0	0	64.0	36	16	15	43	73
Henry Rodríguez	0	0	10.80	2	0	0	1.2	2	2	2	5	1
Kevin Slowey	1	1	5.30	17	2	0	37.1	53	23	22	9	24
Jacob Turner	4	7	5.97	20	12	0	78.1	106	54	52	23	54
Randy Wolf	1	3	5.26	6	4	1	25.2	33	17	15	6	19
**Team totals**	**77**	**85**	**3.78**	**162**	**162**	**42**	**1457.2**	**1481**	**674**	**613**	**458**	**1190**

== Farm system ==
Level	Team	League	Manager
AAA	New Orleans Zephyrs	Pacific Coast League	Andy Haines
AA	Jacksonville Suns	Southern League	Andy Barkett
A	Jupiter Hammerheads	Florida State League	Brian Schneider
A	Greensboro Grasshoppers	South Atlantic League	Dave Berg
A-Short Season	Batavia Muckdogs	New York–Penn League	Ángel Espada
Rookie	GCL Marlins	Gulf Coast League	Julio Garcia

LEAGUE CHAMPIONS: Jacksonville
