= 2014 San Diego Padres season =

2014 San Diego Padres
- League: National League
- Division: West
- Ballpark: Petco Park
- City: San Diego, California
- Record: 77–85 (.475)
- Divisional place: 3rd
- Owners: Ron Fowler
- General managers: Josh Byrnes (fired on June 22), A.J. Preller (hired on August 5)
- Managers: Bud Black
- Television: Fox Sports San Diego (Dick Enberg, Mark Grant, Mike Pomeranz, Mark Sweeney, Jesse Agler)
- Radio: XEPRS-AM ("The Mighty 1090") (Ted Leitner, Bob Scanlan, Jesse Agler); XEMO-AM (Spanish) (Eduardo Otega, Juan Angel Avila, Pedro Gutierrez)

The 2014 San Diego Padres season was their 46th season in Major League Baseball (MLB), and their tenth at Petco Park. After finishing with a 76–86 record in 2013, they only managed to improve by just one game in 2014, finishing the season with a 77–85 record. After winning the season opener and starting the season 1–1, the Padres stayed under .500 for the rest of the season.

San Diego entered the season with the highest payroll in franchise history, yet still ranked in the bottom third in MLB. They finished the season with its best home record (48–33) since the opening of Petco in 2004. They tied their World Series team of 1984 with 48 home wins, which had only been exceeded by its 1978 team and their pennant-winning 1998 squad.

== Season standings ==
=== National League West ===
NL West
Team	W	L	Pct.	GB	Home	Road
Los Angeles Dodgers	94	68	.580	—	45‍–‍36	49‍–‍32
San Francisco Giants	88	74	.543	6	45‍–‍36	43‍–‍38
San Diego Padres	77	85	.475	17	48‍–‍33	29‍–‍52
Colorado Rockies	66	96	.407	28	45‍–‍36	21‍–‍60
Arizona Diamondbacks	64	98	.395	30	33‍–‍48	31‍–‍50

=== National League Wild Card ===
Division leaders
Team	W	L	Pct.
Washington Nationals	96	66	.593
Los Angeles Dodgers	94	68	.580
St. Louis Cardinals	90	72	.556

Wild Card teams (Top 2 teams qualify for postseason)
Team	W	L	Pct.	GB
Pittsburgh Pirates	88	74	.543	—
San Francisco Giants	88	74	.543	—
Milwaukee Brewers	82	80	.506	6
New York Mets	79	83	.488	9
Atlanta Braves	79	83	.488	9
Miami Marlins	77	85	.475	11
San Diego Padres	77	85	.475	11
Cincinnati Reds	76	86	.469	12
Philadelphia Phillies	73	89	.451	15
Chicago Cubs	73	89	.451	15
Colorado Rockies	66	96	.407	22
Arizona Diamondbacks	64	98	.395	24

2014 National League record Source: MLB Standings Grid – 2014
Team	AZ	ATL	CHC	CIN	COL	LAD	MIA	MIL	NYM	PHI	PIT	SD	SF	STL	WSH	AL
Arizona	–	3–3	5–2	3–4	9–10	4–15	3–4	3–4	2–4	2–4	3–4	12–7	6–13	1–5	1–6	7–13
Atlanta	3–3	–	5–1	5–2	4–3	1–6	9–10	5–2	9–10	11–8	3–4	3–4	1–5	2–4	11–8	7–13
Chicago	2–5	1–5	–	8–11	5–2	3–4	4–2	11–8	5–2	3–3	5–14	3–4	2–4	9–10	3–4	9–11
Cincinnati	4–3	2–5	11–8	–	3–4	3–4	4–3	10–9	2–4	3–3	12–7	1–5	5–2	7–12	3–3	6–14
Colorado	10–9	3–4	2–5	4–3	–	6–13	3–4	1–6	3–4	3–3	2–4	10–9	10–9	1–5	1–5	7–13
Los Angeles	15–4	6–1	4–3	4–3	13–6	–	3–3	1–5	4–2	3–4	2–5	12–7	10–9	4–3	2–4	11–9
Miami	4–3	10–9	2–4	3–4	4–3	3–3	–	3–4	8–11	9–10	2–4	3–4	3–4	4–2	6–13	13–7
Milwaukee	4–3	2–5	8–11	9–10	6–1	5–1	4–3	–	4–3	3–4	12–7	3–3	2–4	7–12	2–4	11–9
New York	4–2	10–9	2–5	4–2	4–3	2–4	11–8	3–4	–	13–6	3–4	3–3	1–6	4–3	4–15	11–9
Philadelphia	4–2	8–11	3–3	3–3	3–3	4–3	10–9	4–3	6–13	–	1–6	4–3	2–5	4–3	10–9	7–13
Pittsburgh	4–3	4–3	14–5	7–12	4–2	5–2	4–2	7–12	4–3	6–1	–	3–3	4–2	8–11	3–4	11–9
San Diego	7–12	4–3	4–3	5–1	9–10	7–12	4–3	3–3	3–3	3–4	3–3	–	10–9	3–4	3–4	9–11
San Francisco	13–6	5–1	4–2	2–5	9–10	9–10	4–3	4–2	6–1	5–2	2–4	9–10	–	4–3	2–5	10–10
St. Louis	5–1	4–2	10–9	12–7	5–1	3–4	2–4	12–7	3–4	3–4	11–8	4–3	3–4	–	5–2	8–12
Washington	6–1	8–11	4–3	3–3	5–1	4–2	13–6	4–2	15–4	9–10	4–3	4–3	5–2	2–5	–	10–10

=== Game log ===
Legend
	Padres win
	Padres loss
	Postponement
**Bold**	Padres team member

2014 San Diego Padres Game Log (77–85)
March/April (13–16)

#	Date	Opponent	Score	Win	Loss	Save	Attendance	Record	Box
1	March 30	Dodgers	3–1	**Thayer** (1–0)	Wilson (0–1)	**Street** (1)	45,567	1–0	Box
2	April 1	Dodgers	2–3	Greinke (1–0)	**Kennedy** (0–1)	Jansen (2)	35,033	1–1	Box
3	April 2	Dodgers	1–5	Haren (1–0)	**Ross** (0–1)		27,498	1–2	Box
4	April 4	@ Marlins	2–8	Koehler (1–0)	**Stults** (0–1)	Hand (1)	17,783	1–3	Box
5	April 5	@ Marlins	0–5	Fernández (2–0)	**Cashner** (0–1)		35,188	1–4	Box
6	April 6	@ Marlins	4–2	**Kennedy** (1–1)	Eovaldi (1–1)	**Street** (2)	22,496	2–4	Box
	April 7	@ Indians	Postponed (rain) to April 9 as part of a doubleheader						
7	April 8	@ Indians	6–8	Kluber (1–1)	**Ross** (0–2)	Axford (3)	9,029	2–5	Box
8	April 9	@ Indians	0–2	McAllister (1–0)	**Stults** (0–2)	Axford (4)		2–6	Box
9	April 9	@ Indians	2–1	**Erlin** (1–0)	Bauer (0–1)	**Street** (3)	9,930	3–6	Box
10	April 11	Tigers	6–0	**Cashner** (1–1)	Porcello (1–1)		30,353	4–6	Box
11	April 12	Tigers	6–2	Verlander (1–1)	**Kennedy** (1–2)		42,182	4–7	Box
12	April 13	Tigers	5–1	**Ross** (1–2)	Scherzer (0–1)		32,267	5–7	Box
13	April 14	Rockies	5–4	**Thayer** (2–0)	Brothers (1–2)	**Street** (4)	14,784	6–7	Box
14	April 15	Rockies	3–2	Nicasio (2–0)	**Erlin** (1–1)	Hawkins (3)	18,012	6–8	Box
15	April 16	Rockies	4–2	**Cashner** (2–1)	De la Rosa (0–3)	**Street** (5)	17,428	7–8	Box
16	April 17	Rockies	1–3	Morales (1–1)	**Kennedy** (1–3)	Hawkins (4)	17,557	7–9	Box
17	April 18	Giants	2–1	**Ross** (2–2)	Cain (0–3)	**Street** (6)	34,839	8–9	Box
18	April 19	Giants	3–1	**Stults** (1–2)	Hudson (2–1)	**Benoit** (1)	43,405	9–9	Box
19	April 20	Giants	4–3	Lincecum (1–1)	**Erlin** (1–2)		25,035	9–10	Box
20	April 21	@ Brewers	3–4	Peralta (3–0)	**Cashner** (2–2)	Rodríguez (8)	25,408	9–11	Box
21	April 22	@ Brewers	2–1	**Roach** (1–0)	Fígaro (0–1)	**Street** (7)	25,815	10–11	Box
22	April 23	@ Brewers	2–5	Lohse (4–1)	**Ross** (2–3)	Rodríguez (9)	28,095	10–12	Box
23	April 24	@ Nationals	4–3	**Torres** (1–0)	Stammen (0–1)	**Street** (8)	22,904	11–12	Box
24	April 25	@ Nationals	1–11	Strasburg (2–2)	**Erlin** (1–3)		25,497	11–13	Box
25	April 26	@ Nationals	0–4	Roark (2–0)	**Cashner** (2–3)		31,590	11–14	Box
26	April 27	@ Nationals	2–4	**Kennedy** (2–3)	Detwiler (0–1)	**Street** (9)	34,873	12–14	Box
27	April 28	@ Giants	4–6	**Ross** (3–3)	Bumgarner (2–3)	**Street** (10)	41,533	13–14	Box
28	April 29	@ Giants	0–6	Petit (2–1)	**Stults** (1–3)		41,952	13–15	Box
29	April 30	@ Giants	2–3	Hudson (4–1)	**Erlin** (1–4)	Romo (7)	42,164	13–16	Box

May (13–14)

#	Date	Opponent	Score	Win	Loss	Save	Attendance	Record	Box
30	May 2	Diamondbacks	0–2	Arroyo (2–2)	**Cashner** (2–4)	Reed (7)	27,032	13–17	Box
31	May 3	Diamondbacks	3–4	McCarthy (1–5)	**Kennedy** (2–4)	Reed (8)	35,213	13–18	Box
32	May 4	Diamondbacks	4–3	**Street** (1–0)	Pérez (0–1)		32,657	14–18	Box
33	May 5	Royals	6–5 (12)	**Stauffer** (1–0)	Collins (0–2)		14,089	15–18	Box
34	May 6	Royals	1–3	Davis (2–1)	**Vincent** (0–1)	Holland (8)	16,542	15–19	Box
35	May 7	Royals	0–8	Shields (4–3)	**Cashner** (2–5)		18,228	15–20	Box
36	May 8	Marlins	1–3 (11)	Ramos (3–0)	Thayer (2–1)	Cishek (7)	17,832	15–21	Box
37	May 9	Marlins	10–1	**Ross** (4–3)	Fernández (4–2)		22,553	16–21	Box
38	May 10	Marlins	9–3	**Stults** (2–3)	Mármol (0–3)		27,719	17–21	Box
39	May 11	Marlins	5–4	**Erlin** (2–4)	Álvarez (2–3)	**Street** (11)	17,682	18–21	Box
40	May 13	@ Reds	2–1	**Benoit** (1–0)	Chapman (0–1)	**Street** (12)	23,269	19–21	Box
--	May 14	@ Reds	Postponed (rain); rescheduled for May 15 as part of a day-night doubleheader						
41	May 15	@ Reds	0–5	Cueto (3–2)	**Kennedy** (2–5)		27,686	19–22	Box
42	May 15	@ Reds	6–1	**Ross** (5–3)	Francis (0–1)		23,544	20–22	Box
43	May 16	@ Rockies	1–3	De la Rosa (5–3)	**Stults** (2–4)	Hawkins (10)	35,384	20–23	Box
44	May 17	@ Rockies	8–5	**Erlin** (3–4)	Lyles (5–1)	**Street** (13)	40,508	21–23	Box
45	May 18	@ Rockies	6–8	Masset (1–0)	**Thayer** (2–2)		44,092	21–24	Box
46	May 20	Twins	3–5	Correia (2–5)	**Kennedy** (2–6)	Perkins (13)	19,136	21–25	Box
47	May 21	Twins	0–2	Hughes (5–1)	**Ross** (5–4)	Perkins (14)	16,079	21–26	Box
48	May 22	Cubs	1–5	Arrieta (1–0)	**Stults** (2–5)	Villanueva (1)	21,263	21–27	Box
49	May 23	Cubs	11–1	**Stauffer** (2–0)	Jackson (3–4)		26,489	22–27	Box
50	May 24	Cubs	2–3	Wood (5–4)	**Buckner** (0–1)	Rondón (6)	42,107	22–28	Box
51	May 25	Cubs	4–3	**Kennedy** (3–6)	Hammel (5–3)	**Street** (14)	32,167	23–28	Box
52	May 26	@ Diamondbacks	5–7	Ziegler (1–1)	**Quackenbush** (0–1)		35,580	23–29	Box
53	May 27	@ Diamondbacks	4–3	**Quackenbush** (1–1)	Marshall (2–1)	**Street** (15)	17,862	24–29	Box
54	May 28	@ Diamondbacks	6–12	Anderson (3–0)	**Stauffer** (2–1)		22,233	24–30	Box
55	May 30	@ White Sox	4–1	**Kennedy** (4–6)	Danks (3–5)	**Street** (16)	25,342	25–30	Box
56	May 31	@ White Sox	4–2	**Ross** (6–4)	Rienzo (4–2)	**Street** (17)	19,025	26–30	Box

June (10–17)

#	Date	Opponent	Score	Win	Loss	Save	Attendance	Record	Box
57	June 1	@ White Sox	1–4	Sale (5–0)	**Stults** (2–6)		23,185	26–31	Box
58	June 2	Pirates	3–10	Morton (2–7)	**Stauffer** (2–2)		18,876	26–32	Box
59	June 3	Pirates	1–4	Cole (6–3)	**Hahn** (0–1)	Grilli (9)	20,520	26–33	Box
60	June 4	Pirates	3–2	**Kennedy** (5–6)	Liriano (1–6)	**Street** (18)	17,923	27–33	Box
61	June 6	Nationals	0–6	Roark (4–4)	**Ross** (6–5)		25,346	27–34	Box
62	June 7	Nationals	4–3 (11)	**Benoit** (2–0)	Stammen (0–2)		29,172	28–34	Box
63	June 8	Nationals	6–0	Zimmermann (5–2)	**Stults** (2–7)		27,046	28–35	Box
64	June 10	@ Phillies	2–5	Burnett (4–5)	**Kennedy** (5–7)	Papelbon (14)	31,037	28–36	Box
65	June 11	@ Phillies	3–0	Papelbon (2–1)	**Vincent** (0–2)		25,398	28–37	Box
66	June 12	@ Phillies	3–7	Kendrick (2–6)	**Stults** (2–8)		29,372	28–38	Box
67	June 13	@ Mets	2–6	Colón (6–5)	**Cashner** (2–6)		28,085	28–39	Box
68	June 14	@ Mets	5–0	**Hahn** (1–1)	Wheeler (2–7)		38,267	29–39	Box
69	June 15	@ Mets	1–3	Torres (3–4)	**Kennedy** (5–8)	Mejía (7)	38,987	29–40	Box
70	June 16	@ Mariners	1–5	Young (6–4)	**Ross** (6–6)		17,512	29–41	Box
71	June 17	@ Mariners	1–6	Elías (6–5)	**Stults** (2–9)		19,896	29–42	Box
72	June 18	Mariners	2–1	**Benoit** (3–0)	Furbush (0–4)	**Street** (19)	27,523	30–42	Box
73	June 19	Mariners	4–1	**Hahn** (2–1)	Leone (2–1)	**Street** (20)	18,755	31–42	Box
74	June 20	Dodgers	6–5	**Thayer** (3–2)	Jansen (0–3)		31,119	32–42	Box
75	June 21	Dodgers	2–4	Beckett (5–4)	**Ross** (6–7)	Jansen (21)	43,474	32–43	Box
76	June 22	Dodgers	1–2	Ryu (9–3)	**Stults** (2–10)	Jansen (22)	32,406	32–44	Box
77	June 23	@ Giants	6–0	**Despaigne** (1–0)	Cain (1–6)		41,360	33–44	Box
78	June 24	@ Giants	7–2	**Hahn** (3–1)	Hudson (7–4)		41,546	34–44	Box
79	June 25	@ Giants	0–4	Lincecum (6–5)	**Kennedy** (5–9)		41,500	34–45	Box
80	June 27	Diamondbacks	1–2	McCarthy (2–10)	**Ross** (6–8)	Reed (18)	25,897	34–46	Box
81	June 28	Diamondbacks	1–3	Collmenter (7–4)	**Stults** (2–11)	Reed (19)	31,527	34–47	Box
82	June 29	Diamondbacks	2–1	**Despaigne** (2–0)	Bolsinger (1–4)	**Street** (21)	20,267	35–47	Box
83	June 30	Reds	1–0	**Hahn** (4–1)	Latos (1–1)	**Street** (22)	19,079	36–47	Box

July (12–13)

#	Date	Opponent	Score	Win	Loss	Save	Attendance	Record	Box
84	July 1	Reds	8–2	**Kennedy** (6–9)	Leake (6–7)		20,312	37–47	Box
85	July 2	Reds	3–0	**Ross** (7–8)	Cueto (8–6)		19,250	38–47	Box
86	July 4	Giants	2–0	**Stults** (3–11)	Cain (1–7)	**Street** (23)	31,126	39–47	Box
87	July 5	Giants	3–5	Romo (4–3)	**Thayer** (3–3)	Casilla (2)	36,127	39–48	Box
88	July 6	Giants	5–3	Lincecum (8–5)	**Hahn** (4–2)	Casilla (3)	28,065	39–49	Box
89	July 7	@ Rockies	6–1	**Kennedy** (7–9)	Matzek (1–3)		26,782	40–49	Box
90	July 8	@ Rockies	1–2	Morales (5–4)	**Ross** (7–9)	Hawkins (16)	27,601	40–50	Box
91	July 9	@ Rockies	3–6	Logan (2–1)	**Benoit** (3–1)	Hawkins (17)	26,212	40–51	Box
92	July 10	@ Dodgers	1–2	Kershaw (11–2)	**Despaigne** (2–1)		50,332	40–52	Box
93	July 11	@ Dodgers	6–3	**Hahn** (5–2)	Haren (8–6)	**Street** (24)	46,073	41–52	Box
94	July 12	@ Dodgers	0–1	Jansen (1–3)	**Quackenbush** (1–2)		51,794	41–53	Box
95	July 13	@ Dodgers	0–1	Ryu (10–5)	**Ross** (7–10)	Jansen (27)	47,131	41–54	Box
**All-Star Break in Minneapolis, Minnesota**
96	July 18	Mets	4–5	Familia (2–3)	**Benoit** (3–2)	Mejía (11)	27,374	41–55	Box
97	July 19	Mets	6–0	**Ross** (8–10)	Gee (4–2)		42,702	42–55	Box
98	July 20	Mets	2–1	**Benoit** (4–2)	Black (2–3)		31,513	43–55	Box
99	July 22	@ Cubs	0–6	Hendricks (1–0)	**Stults** (3–12)		32,730	43–56	Box
100	July 23	@ Cubs	8–3	**Kennedy** (8–9)	Wada (0–1)		30,718	44–56	Box
101	July 24	@ Cubs	13–3	**Ross** (9–10)	Jackson (5–11)		31,321	45–56	Box
102	July 25	@ Braves	5–2	**Hahn** (6–2)	Wood (7–8)	**Benoit** (2)	31,647	46–56	Box
103	July 26	@ Braves	3–5	Teherán (10–6)	**Despaigne** (2–2)	Kimbrel (31)	33,820	46–57	Box
104	July 27	@ Braves	3–8	Minor (4–6)	**Stults** (3–13)		31,456	46–58	Box
105	July 28	@ Braves	0–2	Santana (10–6)	**Lane** (0–1)	Kimbrel (32)	23,281	46–59	Box
106	July 29	Cardinals	3–1	**Ross** (10–10)	Lynn (11–8)	**Benoit** (3)	33,521	47–59	Box
107	July 30	Cardinals	12–1	**Hahn** (7–2)	Kelly (2–2)		30,973	48–59	Box
108	July 31	Cardinals	2–6	Miller (8–8)	**Despaigne** (2–3)		28,820	48–60	Box

August (16–11)

#	Date	Opponent	Score	Win	Loss	Save	Attendance	Record	Box
109	August 1	Braves	10–1	**Stults** (4–13)	Minor (4–7)		33,779	49–60	Box
110	August 2	Braves	3–2	**Stauffer** (3–2)	Kimbrel (0–3)		39,402	50–60	Box
111	August 3	Braves	4–3	**Stauffer** (4–2)	Hale (3–4)		30,861	51–60	Box
112	August 5	@ Twins	1–3	Hughes (11–8)	**Hahn** (7–3)	Perkins (28)	34,495	51–61	Box
113	August 6	@ Twins	5–4	**Quackenbush** (2–2)	Swarzak (2–1)	**Benoit** (4)	34,567	52–61	Box
114	August 8	@ Pirates	1–2	Worley (5–1)	**Kennedy** (8–10)	Melancon (21)	38,088	52–62	Box
115	August 9	@ Pirates	2–1	**Stults** (5–13)	Liriano (3–8)	**Benoit** (5)	38,614	53–62	Box
116	August 10	@ Pirates	8–2	**Ross** (11–10)	Morton (5–11)		38,030	54–62	Box
117	August 11	Rockies	4–3	**Vincent** (1–2)	Logan (2–3)	**Benoit** (6)	28,591	55–62	Box
118	August 12	Rockies	4–1	**Despaigne** (3–3)	Flande (0–5)		27,188	56–62	Box
119	August 13	Rockies	5–3	**Kennedy** (9–10)	Matzek (2–8)	**Benoit** (7)	23,902	57–62	Box
120	August 14	@ Cardinals	3–4	Maness (4–2)	**Torres** (1–1)	Rosenthal (36)	45,126	57–63	Box
121	August 15	@ Cardinals	2–4	Lynn (13–8)	**Ross** (11–11)	Neshek (4)	42,662	57–64	Box
122	August 16	@ Cardinals	9–5	**Torres** (2–1)	Siegrist (1–3)		44,079	58–64	Box
123	August 17	@ Cardinals	6–7	Wainwright (15–7)	**Despaigne** (3–4)	Maness (2)	43,149	58–65	Box
124	August 19	@ Dodgers	6–8	Correia (7–13)	**Kennedy** (9–11)	Jansen (35)	45,459	58–66	Box
125	August 20	@ Dodgers	4–1	**Stults** (6–13)	Hernández (7–9)	**Quackenbush** (1)	46,641	59–66	Box
126	August 21	@ Dodgers	1–2	Kershaw (15–3)	**Ross** (11–12)	Jansen (36)	39,596	59–67	Box
127	August 22	@ Diamondbacks	1–5	Collmenter (9–7)	**Despaigne** (3–5)		24,835	59–68	Box
128	August 23	@ Diamondbacks	2–5	Pérez (3–3)	**Quackenbush** (2–3)	Reed (30)	30,583	59–69	Box
129	August 24	@ Diamondbacks	7–4	**Kennedy** (10–11)	Anderson (7–6)	**Benoit** (8)	20,852	60–69	Box
130	August 25	Brewers	1–10	Lohse (12–7)	**Stults** (6–14)		24,968	60–70	Box
131	August 26	Brewers	4–1	**Ross** (12–12)	Nelson (2–5)	**Benoit** (9)	21,786	61–70	Box
132	August 27	Brewers	3–2 (10)	**Thayer** (4–3)	Duke (4–1)		21,156	62–70	Box
133	August 29	Dodgers	3–2	**Stauffer** (5–2)	Correia (7–15)		30,818	63–70	Box
134	August 30	Dodgers	2–1	**Stauffer** (6–2)	Wright (4–4)		43,926	64–70	Box
135	August 31	Dodgers	1–7	Ryu (14–6)	**Stults** (6–15)		37,169	64–71	Box

September (13–14)

#	Date	Opponent	Score	Win	Loss	Save	Attendance	Record	Box
136	September 1	Diamondbacks	3–1	**Ross** (13–12)	Cahill (3–10)	**Quackenbush** (2)	18,564	65–71	Box
137	September 2	Diamondbacks	2–1	**Quackenbush** (5–3)	Ziegler (5–3)		14,316	66–71	Box
138	September 3	Diamondbacks	1–6	Collmenter (10–7)	**Cashner** (2–7)		16,335	66–72	Box
139	September 4	Diamondbacks	1–5	Delgado (3–3)	**Kennedy** (10–12)		16,025	66–73	Box
140	September 5	@ Rockies	0–3	Matzek (5–9)	**Stults** (6–16)		24,586	66–74	Box
141	September 6	@ Rockies	6–7	Masset (2–0)	**Hahn** (7–4)		28,496	66–75	Box
142	September 7	@ Rockies	0–6	Morales (6–7)	**Ross** (13–13)		26,102	66–76	Box
143	September 8	@ Dodgers	4–9	Kershaw (18–3)	**Despaigne** (3–6)		41,886	66–77	Box
144	September 9	@ Dodgers	6–3	**Cashner** (3–7)	Hernández (8–11)		45,213	67–77	Box
145	September 10	@ Dodgers	0–4	Haren (13–10)	**Kennedy** (10–13)		45,586	67–78	Box
146	September 12	@ Diamondbacks	6–5	**Stults** (7–16)	Nuño (2–11)	**Quackenbush** (3)	31,238	68–78	Box
147	September 13	@ Diamondbacks	4–10	Anderson (9–6)	**Ross** (13–14)		32,429	68–79	Box
148	September 14	@ Diamondbacks	6–8	Spruill (1–1)	**Despaigne** (3–7)		26,075	68–80	Box
149	September 15	Phillies	1–0	**Cashner** (4–7)	Williams (5–7)		17,558	69–80	Box
150	September 16	Phillies	5–4	**Kennedy** (11–13)	Burnett (8–17)	**Quackenbush** (4)	24,541	70–80	Box
151	September 17	Phillies	2–5	Hamels (9–7)	**Stults** (7–17)		17,311	70–81	Box
152	September 18	Phillies	7–3	**Erlin** (4–4)	Kendrick (9–13)		18,076	71–81	Box
153	September 19	Giants	5–0	**Despaigne** (4–7)	Hudson (9–12)		34,472	72–81	Box
154	September 20	Giants	2–3	**Cashner** (5–7)	Petit (5–5)	**Quackenbush** (5)	40,660	73–81	Box
155	September 21	Giants	8–2	**Kennedy** (12–13)	Vogelsong (8–12)		32,480	74–81	Box
156	September 22	Rockies	1–0	**Stults** (8–17)	Matzek (6–11)	**Quackenbush** (6)	19,770	75–81	Box
157	September 23	Rockies	2–3	Nicasio (6–6)	**Thayer** (4–4)	Hawkins (33)	33,669	75–82	Box
158	September 24	Rockies	4–3	**Wieland** (1–0)	Flande (0–6)	**Benoit** (10)	38,589	76–82	Box
159	September 25	@ Giants	8–9	Lincecum (11–9)	**Boyer** (0–1)	Casilla (18)	41,850	76–83	Box
160	September 26	@ Giants	4–1	**Kennedy** (13–13)	Vogelsong (8–13)	**Benoit** (11)	41,926	77–83	Box
161	September 27	@ Giants	1–3	Strickland (1–0)	**Thayer** (4–5)	Casilla (19)	41,157	77–84	Box
162	September 28	@ Giants	3–9	Lincecum (12–9)	**Erlin** (4–5)		41,077	77–85	Box

=== Roster ===
2014 San Diego Padres
**Roster**
**Pitchers**: 61 R. J. Alvarez; 40 Héctor Ambriz; 56 Joaquín Benoit; 58 Blaine Boyer; 40 Billy Buckner; 57 Leonel Campos; 34 Andrew Cashner; 40 Odrisamer Despaigne; 41 Robbie Erlin; 60 Frank Garcés; 45 Jesse Hahn; 22 Ian Kennedy; 40,57 Jason Lane; 29 Troy Patton; 59 Kevin Quackenbush; 39 Donn Roach; 38 Tyson Ross; 46 Tim Stauffer; 16 Huston Street; 53 Eric Stults; 33 Dale Thayer; 54 Alex Torres; 50 Nick Vincent; 43 Joe Wieland	**Catchers**: 8 Yasmani Grandal; 4 Nick Hundley; 21 Adam Moore; 44 René Rivera; **Infielders**: 23 Yonder Alonso; 5 Alexi Amarista; 88 Kyle Blanks; 2 Everth Cabrera; 11 Brooks Conrad; 1 Irving Falú; 4 Jake Goebbert; 9 Jedd Gyorko; 7 Chase Headley; 14 Tommy Medica; 1 Chris Nelson; 3 Jace Peterson; 27 Yangervis Solarte; 15 Cory Spangenberg	**Outfielders**: 16 Abraham Almonte; 13 Chris Denorfia; 15 Jeff Francoeur; 7 Rymer Liriano; 24 Cameron Maybin; 21 Xavier Nady; 18 Carlos Quentin; 12 Seth Smith; 25 Will Venable	**Manager**: 20 Bud Black; **Coaches**: 36 Darren Balsley (pitching); 81 Griffin Benedict (bullpen catcher); 47 Willie Blair (bullpen); 80 Justin Hatcher (bullpen catcher); 30 Glenn Hoffman (third base); 28 Phil Plantier (hitting); 32 Alonzo Powell (assistant hitting); 10 Dave Roberts (bench); 17 José Valentín (first base)

== Player stats ==
=== Batting ===
Note: G = Games played; AB = At bats; R = Runs; H = Hits; 2B = Doubles; 3B = Triples; HR = Home runs; RBI = Runs batted in; SB = Stolen bases; BB = Walks; AVG = Batting average; SLG = Slugging average

Player	G	AB	R	H	2B	3B	HR	RBI	SB	BB	AVG	SLG
Seth Smith	136	443	55	118	31	5	12	48	1	69	.266	.440
Alexi Amarista	148	423	39	101	13	2	5	40	12	29	.239	.314
Will Venable	146	406	47	91	13	2	8	33	11	33	.224	.325
Jedd Gyorko	111	400	37	84	17	1	10	51	3	36	.210	.333
Yasmani Grandal	128	377	47	85	19	1	15	49	3	58	.225	.401
Everth Cabrera	90	357	36	83	13	1	3	20	18	20	.232	.300
René Rivera	103	294	27	74	18	1	11	44	0	27	.252	.432
Chase Headley	77	279	27	64	12	1	7	32	4	22	.229	.355
Yonder Alonso	84	267	27	64	19	1	7	27	6	17	.240	.397
Cameron Maybin	95	251	24	59	13	4	1	15	4	19	.235	.331
Chris Denorfia	89	248	25	60	10	3	1	16	8	18	.242	.319
Tommy Medica	102	240	31	56	11	2	9	27	6	14	.233	.408
Yangervis Solarte	56	217	30	58	5	1	4	17	0	23	.267	.355
Carlos Quentin	50	130	9	23	6	0	4	18	0	17	.177	.315
Rymer Liriano	38	109	13	24	2	0	1	6	4	9	.220	.266
Jake Goebbert	51	101	12	22	1	3	1	10	2	12	.218	.317
Abraham Almonte	32	98	9	26	5	0	2	7	1	6	.265	.378
Chris Nelson	27	73	5	17	3	0	0	7	1	7	.233	.274
Cory Spangenberg	20	62	7	18	2	1	2	9	4	2	.290	.452
Nick Hundley	33	59	1	16	3	0	1	3	0	0	.271	.373
Jace Peterson	27	53	3	6	0	0	0	0	2	2	.113	.113
Xavier Nady	22	37	4	5	1	0	3	4	0	5	.135	.405
Brooks Conrad	13	30	2	3	1	0	1	2	0	3	.100	.233
Jeff Francoeur	10	24	2	2	0	0	0	1	0	3	.083	.083
Irving Falú	11	20	0	3	0	0	0	0	1	3	.150	.150
Adam Moore	9	10	1	2	1	0	0	1	0	2	.200	.300
Kyle Blanks	5	10	1	2	0	0	0	0	0	0	.200	.200
Pitcher totals	162	276	14	33	5	1	1	13	0	12	.120	.156
Team totals	162	5294	535	1199	224	30	109	500	91	468	.226	.342

=== Pitching ===
Note: W = Wins; L = Losses; ERA = Earned run average; G = Games pitched; GS = Games started; SV = Saves; IP = Innings pitched; H = Hits allowed; R = Runs allowed; ER = Earned runs allowed; BB = Walks allowed; SO = Strikeouts

Player	W	L	ERA	G	GS	SV	IP	H	R	ER	BB	SO
Ian Kennedy	13	13	3.63	33	33	0	201.0	189	85	81	70	207
Tyson Ross	13	14	2.81	31	31	0	195.2	165	75	61	72	95
Eric Stults	8	17	4.30	32	32	0	176.0	197	93	84	45	111
Andrew Cashner	5	7	2.55	19	19	0	123.1	110	42	35	29	93
Odrisamer Despaigne	4	7	3.36	16	16	0	96.1	85	44	36	32	65
Jesse Hahn	7	4	3.07	14	12	0	73.1	57	26	25	32	70
Dale Thayer	4	5	2.34	70	0	0	65.1	53	19	17	16	62
Tim Stauffer	6	2	3.50	44	3	0	64.1	67	25	25	23	67
Robbie Erlin	4	5	4.99	13	11	0	61.1	71	34	34	15	46
Nick Vincent	1	2	3.60	63	0	0	55.0	44	22	22	11	62
Kevin Quackenbush	3	3	2.48	56	0	6	54.1	42	15	15	18	56
Joaquín Benoit	4	2	1.49	53	0	11	54.1	28	10	9	14	64
Alex Torres	2	1	3.33	70	0	0	54.0	46	25	20	33	51
Blaine Boyer	0	1	3.57	32	0	0	40.1	34	16	16	8	29
Huston Street	1	0	1.09	33	0	24	33.0	18	4	4	7	34
Donn Roach	1	0	4.75	16	1	0	30.1	36	17	16	15	17
Joe Wieland	1	0	7.15	4	2	0	11.1	16	9	9	5	8
Jason Lane	0	1	0.87	3	1	0	10.1	7	1	1	0	6
Frank Garcés	0	0	2.00	15	0	0	9.0	8	2	2	1	10
R.J. Alvarez	0	0	1.13	10	0	0	8.0	3	1	1	5	9
Troy Patton	0	0	2.45	8	0	0	7.1	7	2	2	1	8
Leonel Campos	0	0	5.14	6	0	0	7.0	9	5	4	4	9
Billy Buckner	0	1	4.76	1	1	0	5.2	6	3	3	4	4
Héctor Ambriz	0	0	4.50	1	0	0	2.0	2	2	1	2	1
Team totals	77	85	3.27	162	162	41	1438.2	1300	577	523	462	1284

== Farm system ==
Level	Team	League	Manager
AAA	El Paso Chihuahuas	Pacific Coast League	Pat Murphy
AA	San Antonio Missions	Texas League	Rich Dauer
A	Lake Elsinore Storm	California League	Jamie Quirk
A	Fort Wayne TinCaps	Midwest League	Michael Collins
A-Short Season	Eugene Emeralds	Northwest League	Robbie Wine
Rookie	AZL Padres	Arizona League	Anthony Contreras
