= 2014 New York Mets season =

2014 New York Mets
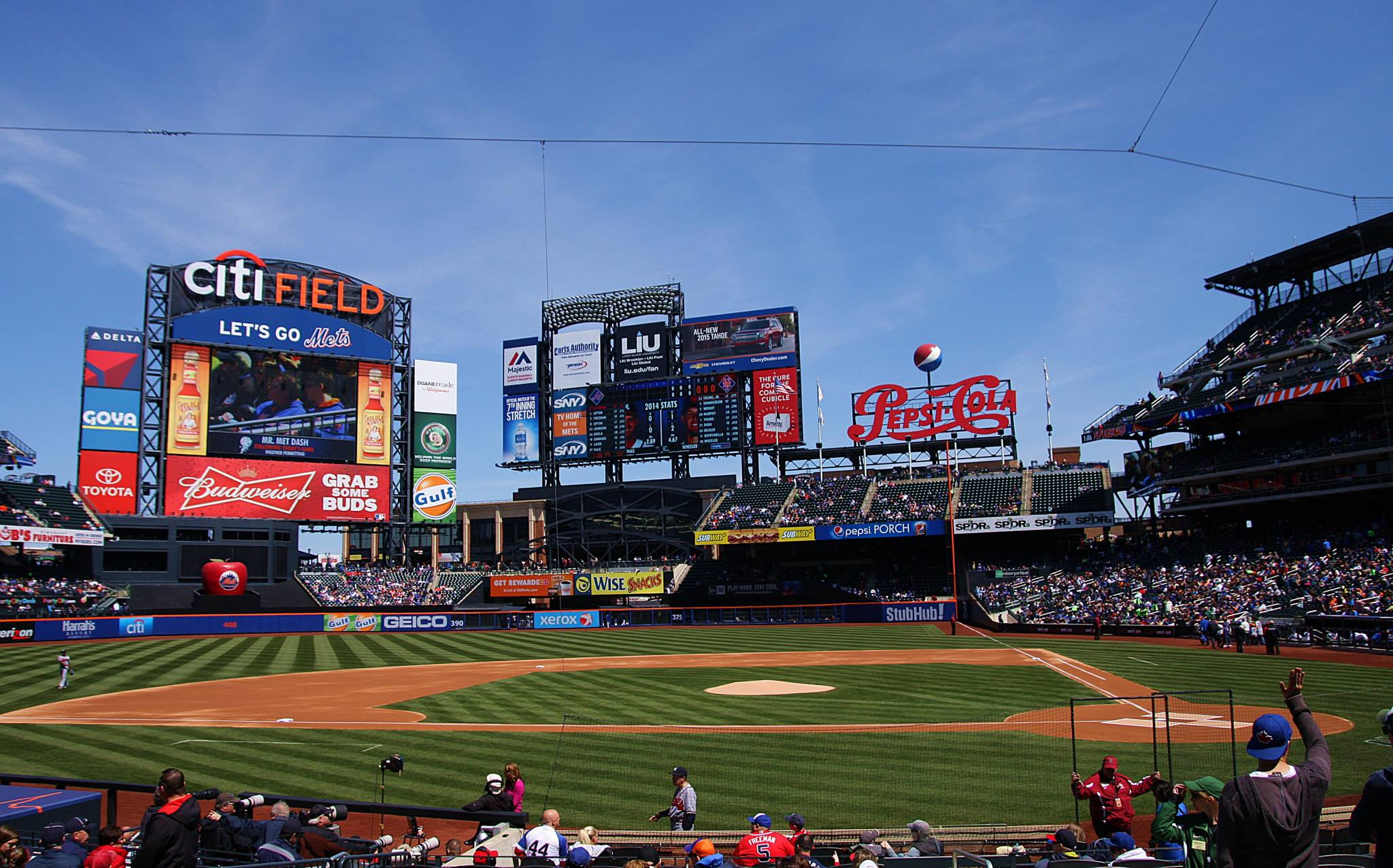
- Citi Field, April 2014
- League: National League
- Division: East
- Ballpark: Citi Field
- City: New York, New York
- Record: 79–83 (.488)
- Divisional place: 3rd
- Owners: Fred Wilpon
- General manager: Sandy Alderson
- Manager: Terry Collins
- Television: SportsNet New York; WPIX (CW affiliate) (Gary Cohen, Ron Darling, Keith Hernandez)
- Radio: WOR (English); New York Mets Radio Network (Howie Rose, Josh Lewin); WQBU-FM (Spanish) (Juan Alicea, Max Perez Jiminez)

The 2014 New York Mets season was the 53rd season of the franchise. The Mets finished 79–83, their most wins since the 2010 season. Also, they finished tied for second place in the National League East, their highest place in the standings since 2008. Despite their sub-.500 record, the Mets had a positive run differential, scoring 629 runs and allowing 618, for a Pythagorean expectation of 82–80. On July 8, the Mets won 8–3 over the Atlanta Braves to celebrate their 4,000th win in team history.

== Offseason ==
On November 22, 2013, the Mets signed Chris Young to a one-year $7.25 million deal.

The Mets agreed to terms with free agent outfielder Curtis Granderson on a four-year contract worth $60 million on December 6, 2013.

The Mets signed Bartolo Colón to a two-year, $20 million deal on December 11, 2013 to bolster their starting rotation, with the expected season long absence of ace starter Matt Harvey due to Tommy John surgery in October.

The Mets opened up the regular season on March 31, 2014 at home against the Washington Nationals.

== Season standings ==
=== National League East ===
NL East
Team	W	L	Pct.	GB	Home	Road
Washington Nationals	96	66	.593	—	51‍–‍30	45‍–‍36
Atlanta Braves	79	83	.488	17	42‍–‍39	37‍–‍44
New York Mets	79	83	.488	17	40‍–‍41	39‍–‍42
Miami Marlins	77	85	.475	19	42‍–‍39	35‍–‍46
Philadelphia Phillies	73	89	.451	23	37‍–‍44	36‍–‍45

=== National League Wild Card ===
Division leaders
Team	W	L	Pct.
Washington Nationals	96	66	.593
Los Angeles Dodgers	94	68	.580
St. Louis Cardinals	90	72	.556

Wild Card teams (Top 2 teams qualify for postseason)
Team	W	L	Pct.	GB
Pittsburgh Pirates	88	74	.543	—
San Francisco Giants	88	74	.543	—
Milwaukee Brewers	82	80	.506	6
New York Mets	79	83	.488	9
Atlanta Braves	79	83	.488	9
Miami Marlins	77	85	.475	11
San Diego Padres	77	85	.475	11
Cincinnati Reds	76	86	.469	12
Philadelphia Phillies	73	89	.451	15
Chicago Cubs	73	89	.451	15
Colorado Rockies	66	96	.407	22
Arizona Diamondbacks	64	98	.395	24

== Record vs. opponents ==
2014 National League record Source: MLB Standings Grid – 2014
Team	AZ	ATL	CHC	CIN	COL	LAD	MIA	MIL	NYM	PHI	PIT	SD	SF	STL	WSH	AL
Arizona	–	3–3	5–2	3–4	9–10	4–15	3–4	3–4	2–4	2–4	3–4	12–7	6–13	1–5	1–6	7–13
Atlanta	3–3	–	5–1	5–2	4–3	1–6	9–10	5–2	9–10	11–8	3–4	3–4	1–5	2–4	11–8	7–13
Chicago	2–5	1–5	–	8–11	5–2	3–4	4–2	11–8	5–2	3–3	5–14	3–4	2–4	9–10	3–4	9–11
Cincinnati	4–3	2–5	11–8	–	3–4	3–4	4–3	10–9	2–4	3–3	12–7	1–5	5–2	7–12	3–3	6–14
Colorado	10–9	3–4	2–5	4–3	–	6–13	3–4	1–6	3–4	3–3	2–4	10–9	10–9	1–5	1–5	7–13
Los Angeles	15–4	6–1	4–3	4–3	13–6	–	3–3	1–5	4–2	3–4	2–5	12–7	10–9	4–3	2–4	11–9
Miami	4–3	10–9	2–4	3–4	4–3	3–3	–	3–4	8–11	9–10	2–4	3–4	3–4	4–2	6–13	13–7
Milwaukee	4–3	2–5	8–11	9–10	6–1	5–1	4–3	–	4–3	3–4	12–7	3–3	2–4	7–12	2–4	11–9
New York	4–2	10–9	2–5	4–2	4–3	2–4	11–8	3–4	–	13–6	3–4	3–3	1–6	4–3	4–15	11–9
Philadelphia	4–2	8–11	3–3	3–3	3–3	4–3	10–9	4–3	6–13	–	1–6	4–3	2–5	4–3	10–9	7–13
Pittsburgh	4–3	4–3	14–5	7–12	4–2	5–2	4–2	7–12	4–3	6–1	–	3–3	4–2	8–11	3–4	11–9
San Diego	7–12	4–3	4–3	5–1	9–10	7–12	4–3	3–3	3–3	3–4	3–3	–	10–9	3–4	3–4	9–11
San Francisco	13–6	5–1	4–2	2–5	9–10	9–10	4–3	4–2	6–1	5–2	2–4	9–10	–	4–3	2–5	10–10
St. Louis	5–1	4–2	10–9	12–7	5–1	3–4	2–4	12–7	3–4	3–4	11–8	4–3	3–4	–	5–2	8–12
Washington	6–1	8–11	4–3	3–3	5–1	4–2	13–6	4–2	15–4	9–10	4–3	4–3	5–2	2–5	–	10–10

== Regular season ==
=== Detailed record ===
Team	Home	Away	Total	Win %
NL East
Atlanta Braves	5–5	5–4	10–9	.526
Miami Marlins	6–3	6–5	11–8	.579
Philadelphia Phillies	5–4	8–2	13–6	.684
Washington Nationals	1–9	3–6	4–15	.211
	17–21	22–17	38–38	.500
NL Central
Chicago Cubs	2–2	0–3	2–5	.286
Cincinnati Reds	2–1	2–1	4–2	.667
Milwaukee Brewers	1–2	2–2	3–4	.429
Pittsburgh Pirates	2–1	1–3	3–4	.429
St. Louis Cardinals	3–1	1–2	4–3	.571
	8–5	4–10	12–15	.444
NL West
Arizona Diamondbacks	1–2	3–0	4–2	.667
Colorado Rockies	3–0	1–3	4–3	.571
Los Angeles Dodgers	1–2	1–2	2–4	.333
San Diego Padres	2–1	1–2	3–3	.500
San Francisco Giants	1–3	0–3	1–6	.143
	5–8	5–8	14–18	.438
American League
Houston Astros	2-1	N/A	2-1	.667
Los Angeles Angels of Anaheim	N/A	1–2	1–2	.333
New York Yankees	0–2	2–0	2–2	.500
Oakland Athletics	1–1	1–1	2–2	.500
Seattle Mariners	N/A	2–1	2–1	.667
Texas Rangers	2–1	N/A	2–1	.667
	5–5	6–4	11–9	.550

Month	Games	Won	Lost	Win %
March	1	0	1	.000
April	25	15	10	.600
May	29	11	18	.379
June	28	11	17	.393
July	25	15	10	.600
August	29	12	17	.414
September	25	15	10	.600
	162	79	83	.488

	Games	Won	Lost	Win %
Home	81	40	41	.494
Away	81	39	42	.481

- Most runs scored in a game: 14 (9/7 vs. CIN)
- Most runs allowed in a game: 14 (4/13 vs. LAA)
- Most hits in a game: 18 (7/8 vs. ATL)
- Longest winning streak: 4 games (7/6–7/9; 7/11–7/18)
- Longest losing streak: 6 games (6/3–6/8)

== Game log ==
Legend
Mets Win	Mets Loss	Game Postponed
Bold = Mets team member

2014 Game Log
Overall: 79–83 (Home: 40–41; Away: 39–42)
March/April: 15–11 (Home: 8–8; Away: 7–3)

#	Date	Opponent	Box Score	Win	Loss	Save	Location (Attendance)	Record
1	March 31	Nationals	7–9 (10)	Aaron Barrett (1–0)	**Jeurys Familia** (0–1)		Citi Field (42,442)	0–1
2	April 2	Nationals	1–5	Gio González (1–0)	**Bartolo Colón** (0–1)		Citi Field (29,146)	0–2
3	April 3	Nationals	2–8	Tanner Roark (1-0)	**Zack Wheeler** (0-1)		Citi Field (20,561)	0–3
4	April 4	Reds	4–3	**Jenrry Mejía** (1–0)	Mike Leake (0–1)	**José Valverde** (1)	Citi Field (35,845)	1–3
5	April 5	Reds	6–3	**Carlos Torres** (1–0)	J. J. Hoover (1–1)		Citi Field (25,424)	2–3
6	April 6	Reds	1–2	Alfredo Simón (1–0)	**Jon Niese** (0–1)	Manny Parra (1)	Citi Field (26,928)	2–4
7	April 8	@Braves	4–0	**Bartolo Colón** (1–1)	Aaron Harang (1–1)		Turner Field (47,144)	3–4
8	April 9	@Braves	3–4	Ervin Santana (1–0)	**Zack Wheeler** (0–2)	Craig Kimbrel (4)	Turner Field (19,608)	3–5
9	April 10	@Braves	6–4	**Carlos Torres** (2–0)	Luis Avilán (1–1)	**José Valverde** (2)	Turner Field (29,470)	4–5
10	April 11	@Angels	4–5 (11)	Michael Kohn (1–0)	**Jeurys Familia** (0–2)		Angel Stadium (42,871)	4–6
11	April 12	@Angels	7–6 (13)	**John Lannan** (1–0)	Matt Shoemaker (0–1)		Angel Stadium (40,027)	5–6
12	April 13	@Angels	2–14	C. J. Wilson (2–1)	**Bartolo Colón** (1–2)		Angel Stadium (38,855)	5–7
13	April 14	@Diamondbacks	7–3	**Zack Wheeler** (1–2)	Josh Collmenter (0–1)	**Carlos Torres** (1)	Chase Field (18,099)	6–7
14	April 15	@Diamondbacks	9–0	**Jenrry Mejía** (2–0)	Bronson Arroyo (1–1)		Chase Field (21,969)	7–7
15	April 16	@Diamondbacks	5–2	**Dillon Gee** (1–0)	Brandon McCarthy (0–3)		Chase Field (19,673)	8–7
16	April 18	Braves	0–6	Aaron Harang (3–1)	**Jon Niese** (0–2)		Citi Field (33,199)	8–8
17	April 19	Braves	5–7	Ervin Santana (2–0)	**Bartolo Colón** (1–3)	Jordan Walden (1)	Citi Field (31,476)	8–9
18	April 20	Braves	4–3 (14)	**José Valverde** (1–0)	Gus Schlosser (0–1)		Citi Field (33,131)	9–9
19	April 21	Cardinals	2–0	**Jenrry Mejía** (3–0)	Tyler Lyons (0–1)	**Kyle Farnsworth** (1)	Citi Field (20,382)	10–9
20	April 22	Cardinals	0–3	Adam Wainwright (4–1)	**Dillon Gee** (1–1)	Trevor Rosenthal (6)	Citi Field (20,220)	10–10
21	April 23	Cardinals	3–2	**Jon Niese** (1–2)	Michael Wacha (2–2)	**Kyle Farnsworth** (2)	Citi Field (21,981)	11–10
22	April 24	Cardinals	4–1	**Bartolo Colón** (2–3)	Lance Lynn (4–1)	**Daisuke Matsuzaka** (1)	Citi Field (22,669)	12–10
23	April 25	Marlins	4–3	**Jeurys Familia** (1–2)	Steve Cishek (1–1)		Citi Field (21,171)	13–10
24	April 26	Marlins	6–7 (10)	Mike Dunn (2–3)	**Kyle Farnsworth** (0–1)	Steve Cishek (5)	Citi Field (21,492)	13–11
25	April 27	Marlins	4–0	**Dillon Gee** (2–1)	Tom Koehler (2–2)		Citi Field (26,861)	14–11
26	April 29	@Phillies	6–1	**Jon Niese** (2–2)	Cole Hamels (0–2)		Citizens Bank Park (28,189)	15–11
	April 30	@Phillies	Postponed (rain); rescheduled for June 2				Citizens Bank Park	

May: 11–18 (Home: 5–9; Away: 6–9)

#	Date	Opponent	Box Score	Win	Loss	Save	Location (Attendance)	Record
27	May 1	@Rockies	4–7	Juan Nicasio (3–1)	**Bartolo Colón** (2–4)		Coors Field (22,989)	15–12
28	May 2	@Rockies	3–10	Jorge de la Rosa (3–3)	**Zack Wheeler** (1–3)		Coors Field (42,040)	15–13
29	May 3	@Rockies	10–11	LaTroy Hawkins (1–0)	**Kyle Farnsworth** (0–2)		Coors Field (38,688)	15–14
30	May 4	@Rockies	5–1	**Dillon Gee** (3–1)	Jhoulys Chacín (0–1)		Coors Field (40,190)	16–14
31	May 5	@Marlins	3–4	Steve Cishek (2–1)	**Gonzalez Germen** (0–1)		Marlins Park (20,606)	16–15
32	May 6	@Marlins	0–3	Henderson Álvarez (2–2)	**Bartolo Colón** (2–5)		Marlins Park (18,315)	16–16
33	May 7	@Marlins	0–1	Steve Cishek (3–1)	**Carlos Torres** (2–1)		Marlins Park (18,010)	16–17
34	May 9	Phillies	2–3 (11)	Mario Hollands (1–1)	**Carlos Torres** (2–2)	Jonathan Papelbon (10)	Citi Field (30,036)	16–18
35	May 10	Phillies	4–5	Mike Adams (2–1)	**Kyle Farnsworth** (0–3)	Jonathan Papelbon (11)	Citi Field (29,170)	16–19
36	May 11	Phillies	5–4 (11)	**Scott Rice** (1–1)	Jeff Manship (1–1)		Citi Field (28,926)	17–19
37	May 12	@Yankees	9–7	**Jenrry Mejía** (4–0)	Matt Thornton (0–1)	**Kyle Farnsworth** (3)	Yankee Stadium (46,517)	18–19
38	May 13	@Yankees	12–7	**Daisuke Matsuzaka** (1–0)	Vidal Nuño (1–1)		Yankee Stadium (45,958)	19–19
39	May 14	Yankees	0–4	Masahiro Tanaka (6–0)	**Rafael Montero** (0–1)		Citi Field (35,557)	19–20
40	May 15	Yankees	0–1	Dellin Betances (2–0)	**Jacob deGrom** (0–1)	David Robertson (7)	Citi Field (40,133)	19–21
41	May 16	@Nationals	2–5	Tanner Roark (3–1)	**Jon Niese** (2–3)	Rafael Soriano (9)	Nationals Park (34,413)	19–22
42	May 17	@Nationals	5–2	**Bartolo Colón** (3–5)	Gio González (3–4)	**Jenrry Mejía** (1)	Nationals Park (41,225)	20–22
43	May 18	@Nationals	3–6	Jordan Zimmermann (3–1)	**Zack Wheeler** (1–4)	Rafael Soriano (10)	Nationals Park (36,965)	20–23
44	May 20	Dodgers	4–9	Josh Beckett (2–1)	**Rafael Montero** (0–2)		Citi Field (22,288)	20–24
45	May 21	Dodgers	3–4	Hyun-jin Ryu (4–2)	**Jacob deGrom** (0–2)	Kenley Jansen (13)	Citi Field (23,721)	20–25
46	May 22	Dodgers	5–3	**Jon Niese** (3–3)	Chris Perez (0–2)	**Jenrry Mejía** (2)	Citi Field (23,416)	21–25
	May 23	Diamondbacks	Postponed (rain); rescheduled for May 25				Citi Field	
47	May 24	Diamondbacks	2–3	Josh Collmenter (3–2)	**Zack Wheeler** (1–5)	Addison Reed (13)	Citi Field (24,551)	21–26
48	May 25	Diamondbacks	1–2	Evan Marshall (2–0)	**Jenrry Mejía** (4–1)	Addison Reed (14)	Citi Field (30,785)	21–27
49	May 25	Diamondbacks	4–2	**Daisuke Matsuzaka** (2–0)	Zeke Spruill (0–1)	**Jenrry Mejía** (3)	Citi Field (30,785)	22–27
50	May 26	Pirates	3–5	Tony Watson (5–0)	**José Valverde** (1–1)	Mark Melancon (10)	Citi Field (29,309)	22–28
51	May 27	Pirates	4–2	**Vic Black** (1–0)	Jeanmar Gómez (0–2)	**Jenrry Mejía** (4)	Citi Field (20,263)	23–28
52	May 28	Pirates	5–0	**Bartolo Colón** (4–5)	Charlie Morton (1–7)	**Jeurys Familia** (1)	Citi Field (34,839)	24–28
53	May 29	@Phillies	4–1	**Zack Wheeler** (2–5)	David Buchanan (1–1)	**Jenrry Mejía** (5)	Citizens Bank Park (26,668)	25–28
54	May 30	@Phillies	5–6 (14)	Justin De Fratus (1–0)	**Jenrry Mejía** (4–2)		Citizens Bank Park (30,236)	25–29
55	May 31	@Phillies	5–4 (14)	**Buddy Carlyle** (1–0)	Antonio Bastardo (3–3)	**Carlos Torres** (2)	Citizens Bank Park (37,516)	26–29

June: 11–17 (Home: 4–4; Away: 7–13)

#	Date	Opponent	Box Score	Win	Loss	Save	Location (Attendance)	Record
56	June 1	@Phillies	4–3 (11)	**Josh Edgin** (1–0)	Phillippe Aumont (0–1)	**Jenrry Mejía** (6)	Citizens Bank Park (36,039)	27–29
57	June 2	@Phillies	11–2	**Bartolo Colón** (5–5)	Roberto Hernández (2–3)		Citizens Bank Park (26,302)	28–29
58	June 3	@Cubs	1–2	Héctor Rondón (1–1)	**Scott Rice** (1–2)		Wrigley Field (34,697)	28–30
59	June 4	@Cubs	4–5	Edwin Jackson (4–5)	**Dana Eveland** (0–1)	Héctor Rondón (7)	Wrigley Field (28,185)	28–31
60	June 5	@Cubs	4–7	Justin Grimm (2–2)	**Vic Black** (1–1)	Neil Ramirez (1)	Wrigley Field (28,833)	28–32
61	June 6	@Giants	2–4	Jeremy Affeldt (1–1)	**Carlos Torres** (2–3)	Sergio Romo (19)	AT&T Park (41,437)	28–33
62	June 7	@Giants	4–5	Jeremy Affeldt (2–1)	**Jenrry Mejía** (4–3)		AT&T Park (41,296)	28–34
63	June 8	@Giants	4–6	Tim Lincecum (5–4)	**Zack Wheeler** (2–6)	Sergio Romo (20)	AT&T Park (41,911)	28–35
64	June 10	Brewers	6–2	**Daisuke Matsuzaka** (3–0)	Marco Estrada (5–3)		Citi Field (20,206)	29–35
65	June 11	Brewers	1–3	Wily Peralta (6–5)	**Jacob deGrom** (0–3)	Francisco Rodríguez (20)	Citi Field (20,170)	29–36
66	June 12	Brewers	1–5	Zach Duke (4–0)	**Carlos Torres** (2–4)		Citi Field (22,155)	29–37
67	June 13	Padres	6–2	**Bartolo Colón** (6–5)	Andrew Cashner (2–6)		Citi Field (28,085)	30–37
68	June 14	Padres	0–5	Jesse Hahn (1–1)	**Zack Wheeler** (2–7)		Citi Field (38,269)	30–38
69	June 15	Padres	3–1	**Carlos Torres** (3–4)	Ian Kennedy (5–8)	**Jenrry Mejía** (7)	Citi Field (38,987)	31–38
70	June 16	@Cardinals	2–6	Nick Greenwood (1–0)	**Jacob deGrom** (0–4)	Seth Maness (1)	Busch Stadium (42,808)	31–39
71	June 17	@Cardinals	2–5	Michael Wacha (5–5)	**Jon Niese** (3–4)	Pat Neshek (2)	Busch Stadium (42,209)	31–40
72	June 18	@Cardinals	3–2	**Bartolo Colón** (7–5)	Lance Lynn (7–5)	**Dana Eveland** (1)	Busch Stadium (42,221)	32–40
73	June 19	@Marlins	1–0	**Zack Wheeler** (3–7)	Andrew Heaney (0–1)		Marlins Park (20,334)	33–40
74	June 20	@Marlins	2–3	Henderson Álvarez (4–3)	**Daisuke Matsuzaka** (3–1)	Steve Cishek (17)	Marlins Park (19,725)	33–41
75	June 21	@Marlins	4–0	**Jacob deGrom** (1–4)	Tom Koehler (5–6)		Marlins Park (24,502)	34–41
76	June 22	@Marlins	11–5	**Jon Niese** (4–4)	Anthony DeSclafani (1–2)		Marlins Park (24,613)	35–41
77	June 24	Athletics	10–1	**Bartolo Colón** (8–5)	Scott Kazmir (9–3)		Citi Field (25,751)	36–41
78	June 25	Athletics	5–8	Brad Mills (1–0)	**Zack Wheeler** (3–8)	Sean Doolittle (11)	Citi Field (23,367)	36–42
79	June 26	@Pirates	2–5	Vance Worley (2–0)	**Daisuke Matsuzaka** (3–2)	Mark Melancon (14)	PNC Park (36,647)	36–43
80	June 27	@Pirates	2–3	Jared Hughes (4–2)	**Vic Black** (1–2)		PNC Park (37,952)	36–44
81	June 28	@Pirates	5–3	**Jon Niese** (5–4)	Gerrit Cole (6–4)	**Jenrry Mejía** (8)	PNC Park (38,930)	37–44
82	June 29	@Pirates	2–5	Edinson Vólquez (6–6)	**Bartolo Colón** (8–6)	Mark Melancon (15)	PNC Park (37,290)	37–45
83	June 30	@Braves	3–5	Anthony Varvaro (3–1)	**Jeurys Familia** (1–3)	Craig Kimbrel (25)	Turner Field (28,075)	37–46

July: 15–10 (Home: 10–3; Away: 5–7)

#	Date	Opponent	Box Score	Win	Loss	Save	Location (Attendance)	Record
84	July 1	@Braves	4–5	Shae Simmons (1–0)	**Daisuke Matsuzaka** (3–3)	Craig Kimbrel (26)	Turner Field (21,347)	37–47
85	July 2	@Braves	1–3	Julio Teherán (8–5)	**Jacob deGrom** (1–5)	Jordan Walden (3)	Turner Field (23,601)	37–48
86	July 4	Rangers	6–5	**Jenrry Mejía** (5–3)	Aaron Poreda (2–1)		Citi Field (30,377)	38–48
87	July 5	Rangers	3–5	Colby Lewis (6–5)	**Bartolo Colón** (8–7)	Joakim Soria (16)	Citi Field (24,418)	38–49
88	July 6	Rangers	8–4	**Zack Wheeler** (4–8)	Nick Tepesch (3–4)		Citi Field (25,213)	39–49
89	July 7	Braves	4–3	**Carlos Torres** (4–4)	Anthony Varvaro (3–2)		Citi Field (20,836)	40–49
90	July 8	Braves	8–3	**Jacob deGrom** (2–5)	Juio Teheran (8–6)		Citi Field (20,671)	41–49
91	July 9	Braves	4–1	**Dillon Gee** (4–1)	Ervin Santana (7–6)	**Jenrry Mejía** (9)	Citi Field (21,327)	42–49
92	July 10	Braves	1–3	Aaron Harang (9–6)	**Bartolo Colón** (8–8)	Craig Kimbrel (28)	Citi Field (23,528)	42–50
93	July 11	Marlins	7–1	**Zack Wheeler** (5–8)	Henderson Álvarez (6–4)		Citi Field (25,914)	43–50
94	July 12	Marlins	5–4	**Vic Black** (2–2)	Mike Dunn (7–5)	**Jenrry Mejía** (10)	Citi Field (35,283)	44–50
95	July 13	Marlins	9–1	**Jacob deGrom** (3–5)	Brad Hand (0–2)		Citi Field (28,187)	45–50
	July 15	N.L. @ A.L.	AL 5–3 NL	2014 Major League Baseball All-Star Game			Target Field (41,048)	
96	July 18	@Padres	5–4	**Jeurys Familia** (2–3)	Joaquín Benoit (3–2)	**Jenrry Mejía** (11)	Petco Park (27,374)	46–50
97	July 19	@Padres	0–6	Tyson Ross (8–10)	**Dillon Gee** (4–2)		Petco Park (42,702)	46–51
98	July 20	@Padres	1–2	Joaquín Benoit (4–2)	**Vic Black** (2–3)		Petco Park (31,513)	46–52
99	July 21	@Mariners	2–5	Roenis Elias (8–8)	**Jon Niese** (5–5)		Safeco Field (21,943)	46–53
100	July 22	@Mariners	3–1	**Jacob deGrom** (4–5)	Erasmo Ramírez (1–5)	**Jenrry Mejía** (12)	Safeco Field (18,681)	47–53
101	July 23	@Mariners	3–2	**Bartolo Colón** (9–8)	Taijuan Walker (1–2)	**Jenrry Mejía** (13)	Safeco Field (36,224)	48–53
102	July 24	@Brewers	1–9	Matt Garza (7–7)	**Dillon Gee** (4–3)		Miller Park (29,755)	48–54
103	July 25	@Brewers	3–2	**Carlos Torres** (5–4)	Francisco Rodríguez (4–4)	**Jenrry Mejía** (14)	Miller Park (33,097)	49–54
104	July 26	@Brewers	2–5	Wily Peralta (12–6)	**Jon Niese** (5–6)	Francisco Rodríguez (30)	Miller Park (39,292)	49–55
105	July 27	@Brewers	2–0	**Jacob deGrom** (5–5)	Jimmy Nelson (1–2)	**Jenrry Mejía** (15)	Miller Park (39,040)	50–55
106	July 28	Phillies	7–1	**Bartolo Colón** (10–8)	A. J. Burnett (6–10)		Citi Field (26,525)	51–55
107	July 29	Phillies	0–6	Cole Hamels (6–5)	**Dillon Gee** (4–4)		Citi Field (27,069)	51–56
108	July 30	Phillies	11–2	**Zack Wheeler** (6–8)	Kyle Kendrick (5–11)		Citi Field (37,647)	52–56

August: 12–17 (Home: 6–11; Away: 6–6)

#	Date	Opponent	Box Score	Win	Loss	Save	Location (Attendance)	Record
109	August 1	Giants	1–5	Ryan Vogelsong (6–8)	**Jon Niese** (5–7)		Citi Field (28,905)	52–57
110	August 2	Giants	4–2	**Jacob deGrom** (6–5)	Jake Peavy (1–11)	**Jenrry Mejía** (16)	Citi Field (33,687)	53–57
111	August 3	Giants	0–9	Madison Bumgarner (13–8)	**Bartolo Colón** (10–9)		Citi Field (32,408)	53–58
112	August 4	Giants	3–4	Sergio Romo (5–3)	**Jenrry Mejía** (5–4)	Santiago Casilla (9)	Citi Field (27,187)	53–59
113	August 5	@Nationals	6–1	**Zack Wheeler** (7–8)	Gio González (6–8)		Nationals Park (40,686)	54–59
114	August 6	@Nationals	1–7	Doug Fister (11–3)	**Jon Niese** (5–8)		Nationals Park (26,701)	54–60
115	August 7	@Nationals	3–5 (13)	Craig Stammen (2–4)	**Carlos Torres** (5–5)		Nationals Park (38,611)	54–61
116	August 8	@Phillies	5–4	**Bartolo Colón** (11–9)	A. J. Burnett (6–12)	**Jenrry Mejía** (17)	Citizens Bank Park (32,307)	55–61
117	August 9	@Phillies	2–1 (11)	**Dana Eveland** (1–1)	Antonio Bastardo (5–5)	**Jeurys Familia** (2)	Citizens Bank Park (39,153)	56–61
118	August 10	@Phillies	6–7	Ken Giles (1–0)	**Jenrry Mejía** (5–5)		Citizens Bank Park (31,061)	56–62
119	August 11	@Phillies	5–3	**Jon Niese** (6–8)	David Buchanan (6–6)	**Jeurys Familia** (3)	Citizens Bank Park (26,076)	57–62
120	August 12	Nationals	1–7	Doug Fister (12–3)	**Rafael Montero** (0-3)		Citi Field (21,200)	57-63
121	August 13	Nationals	2–3	Jordan Zimmermann (8–5)	**Bartolo Colón** (11-10)	Rafael Soriano (27)	Citi Field (21,364)	57-64
122	August 14	Nationals	1–4	Stephen Strasburg (9–10)	**Dillon Gee** (4-5)	Rafael Soriano (28)	Citi Field (22,782)	57-65
123	August 15	Cubs	3–2	**Zack Wheeler** (8–8)	Travis Wood (7–10)	**Jenrry Mejía** (18)	Citi Field (25,016)	58–65
124	August 16	Cubs	7–3	**Jon Niese** (7–8)	Dan Straily (1–3)		Citi Field (30,744)	59–65
125	August 17	Cubs	1–2	Pedro Strop (2–4)	**Jenrry Mejía** (5–6)	Hector Rondon (17)	Citi Field (27,938)	59–66
126	August 18	Cubs	1–4	Kyle Hendricks (5–1)	**Buddy Carlyle** (1–1)	Hector Rondon (18)	Citi Field	59–67
127	August 19	@Athletics	2–6	Scott Kazmir (14–5)	**Dillon Gee** (4–6)		O.co Coliseum (23,498)	59–68
128	August 20	@Athletics	8–5	**Zack Wheeler** (9–8)	Jeff Samardzija (5–10)	Jeurys Familia (4)	O.co Coliseum (20,312)	60–68
129	August 22	@Dodgers	2–6	Dan Haren (11–10)	**Jon Niese** (7–9)		Dodger Stadium (44,374)	60–69
130	August 23	@Dodgers	4–7	Zack Greinke (13–8)	**Jacob deGrom** (6–6)	Kenley Jansen (37)	Dodger Stadium (51,215)	60–70
131	August 24	@Dodgers	11–3	**Bartolo Colón** (12–10)	Kevin Correia (7–14)		Dodger Stadium (47,290)	61–70
132	August 26	Braves	3–2	**Dillon Gee** (5–6)	Alex Wood (9–10)	**Jenrry Mejía** (19)	Citi Field (22,406)	62–70
133	August 27	Braves	2–3	Julio Teherán (13–9)	**Zack Wheeler** (9–9)	Craig Kimbrel (39)	Citi Field (22,014)	62–71
134	August 28	Braves	1–6	Mike Minor (6–8)	**Jon Niese** (7–10)		Citi Field (22,154)	62–72
135	August 29	Phillies	4–1	**Jacob deGrom** (7–6)	Jake Diekman (3–4)	**Jenrry Mejía** (20)	Citi Field (25,250)	63–72
136	August 30	Phillies	2–7	Jerome Williams (5–5)	**Bartolo Colón** (12–11)		Citi Field (28,053)	63–73
137	August 31	Phillies	6–5	**Dillon Gee** (6–6)	A. J. Burnett (7–15)	Jenrry Mejía (21)	Citi Field (27,159)	64–73

September: 15–10 (Home: 5–5; Away: 8–4)

#	Date	Opponent	Box Score	Win	Loss	Save	Location (Attendance)	Record
138	September 1	@Marlins	6–9	A. J. Ramos (6–0)	**Jeurys Familia** (2–4)	Steve Cishek (32)	Marlins Park (23,090)	64–74
139	September 2	@Marlins	8–6	**Jon Niese** (8–10)	Brad Penny (1–1)	**Jenrry Mejía** (22)	Marlins Park (17,745)	65–74
140	September 3	@Marlins	4–3	**Carlos Torres** (6–5)	Mike Dunn (10–6)	**Jenrry Mejía** (23)	Marlins Park (17,737)	66–74
141	September 5	@Reds	14–5	**Bartolo Colón** (13–11)	Alfredo Simón (13–10)		Great American Ball Park (29,089)	67–74
142	September 6	@Reds	1–2	Johnny Cueto (17–8)	**Dillon Gee** (6–7)	Aroldis Chapman (30)	Great American Ball Park (33,762)	67–75
143	September 7	@Reds	4–3	**Zack Wheeler** (10–9)	Mat Latos (5–5)	**Jenrry Mejía** (24)	Great American Ball Park (31,444)	68–75
144	September 8	Rockies	3–2	**Carlos Torres** (7–5)	LaTroy Hawkins (3–3)		Citi Field (21,710)	69–75
145	September 9	Rockies	2–0	**Jacob deGrom** (8–6)	Christian Bergman (2–3)	**Jeurys Familia** (5)	Citi Field (21,035)	70–75
146	September 10	Rockies	2–0	**Rafael Montero** (1–3)	Matzek (5–10)	**Jenrry Mejía** (25)	Citi Field (21,260)	71–75
147	September 11	Nationals	2–6	Tanner Roark (13–10)	**Bartolo Colón** (13-12)		Citi Field (21,111)	71–76
148	September 12	Nationals	4–3	**Dillon Gee** (7–7)	Gio González (8-10)	**Jenrry Mejía** (26)	Citi Field (25,792)	72–76
149	September 13	Nationals	3–10	Doug Fister (14–6)	**Zack Wheeler** (10-10)		Citi Field (28,849)	72–77
150	September 14	Nationals	0–3	Jordan Zimmermann (12–5)	**Jonathon Niese** (8-11)	Drew Storen (5)	Citi Field (31,553)	72–78
151	September 15	Marlins	5–6	Sam Dyson (3–1)	**Jeurys Familia** (2–5)	Steve Cishek (36)	Citi Field (23,027)	72–79
152	September 16	Marlins	9–1	**Bartolo Colón** (14–12)	Nathan Eovaldi (6–12)		Citi Field (21,602)	73–79
153	September 17	Marlins	3–4	Henderson Álvarez (11–6)	**Dillon Gee** (7–8)	Steve Cishek (37)	Citi Field (23,892)	73–80
154	September 19	@Braves	5–0	**Zack Wheeler** (11–10)	Julio Teherán (13–13)		Turner Field (35,693)	74–80
155	September 20	@Braves	4–2	**Jon Niese** (9–11)	Mike Minor (6–12)	**Jenrry Mejía** (27)	Turner Field (33,794)	75–80
156	September 21	@Braves	10–2	**Jacob deGrom** (9–6)	Ervin Santana (14–10)		Turner Field (35,354)	76–80
157	September 23	@Nationals	2–4	Tanner Roark (15–10)	**Bartolo Colón** (14–13)	Drew Storen (10)	Nationals Park (30,714)	76–81
–	September 24	@Nationals	Postponed (rain) Rescheduled for September 25					
158	September 25	@Nationals	7–4	**Carlos Torres** (8–5)	Tyler Clippard (7-4)	**Jenrry Mejía** (28)	Nationals Park (28,629)	77–81
159	September 25	@Nationals	3–0	Gio González (10–10)	**Zack Wheeler** (11–11)	Drew Storen (11)	Nationals Park (26,439)	77–82
160	September 26	Astros	3–1	Kevin Chapman (2-0)	**Carlos Torres** (8-6)	Chad Qualls (19)	Citi Field (27,729)	77-83
161	September 27	Astros	2–1	**Jenrry Mejía** (6-6)	Tony Sipp (4-3)		Citi Field (34,886)	78-83
162	September 28	Astros	8–3	**Bartolo Colón** (15-13)	Nick Tropeano (1-3)		Citi Field (34,897)	79-83

=== Roster ===
2014 New York Mets
**Roster**
**Pitchers**: 68 Darío Álvarez; 38 Vic Black; 44 Buddy Carlyle; 40 Bartolo Colón; 48 Jacob deGrom; 66 Josh Edgin; 61 Dana Eveland; 27 Jeurys Familia; 44 Kyle Farnsworth; 35 Dillon Gee; 71 Gonzalez Germen; 62 Erik Goeddel; 32 John Lannan; 16 Daisuke Matsuzaka; 58 Jenrry Mejía; 50 Rafael Montero; 49 Jon Niese; 39 Bobby Parnell; 56 Scott Rice; 52 Carlos Torres; 47 José Valverde; 45 Zack Wheeler	**Catchers**: 36 Juan Centeno; 15 Travis d'Arnaud; 20 Anthony Recker; 23 Taylor Teagarden; **Infielders**: 29 Ike Davis; 21 Lucas Duda; 4 Wilmer Flores; 2 Dilson Herrera; 28 Daniel Murphy; 0 Omar Quintanilla; 13 Josh Satin; 11 Rubén Tejada; 70 Wilfredo Tovar; 5 David Wright; **Outfielders**: 53 Bobby Abreu; 30 Andrew Brown; 29 Eric Campbell; 6 Matt den Dekker; 3 Curtis Granderson; 12 Juan Lagares; 9 Kirk Nieuwenhuis; 1 Chris Young; 22 Eric Young	**Manager**: 10 Terry Collins; **Coaches**: 25 Ricky Bones (bullpen); 7 Bob Geren (bench); 26 Tom Goodwin (first base); 51 Dave Hudgens (hitting); 57 Lamar Johnson (hitting); 78 Eric Langill (bullpen catcher); 60 Luis Natera (assistant hitting); 54 Dave Racaniello (bullpen catcher); 18 Tim Teufel (third base); 59 Dan Warthen (pitching)

== Player stats ==
=== Batting ===
Players bolded are presently on Mets active roster.
Note: G = Games played; AB = At bats; R = Runs scored; H = Hits; 2B = Doubles; 3B = Triples; HR = Home runs; RBI = Runs batted in; SB = Stolen bases; BB = Base on balls; K = Strikeouts; AVG = Batting average

Player	G	AB	R	H	2B	3B	HR	RBI	SB	BB	K	AVG
Jeurys Familia	76	3	0	2	0	0	0	1	0	0	0	.667
Eric Campbell	85	190	16	50	9	0	3	16	3	17	55	.263
Daniel Murphy	143	596	79	172	37	2	9	57	13	39	86	.289
Juan Lagares	116	416	46	117	24	3	4	47	13	20	87	.281
David Wright	134	535	54	144	30	1	8	63	8	42	113	.269
Lucas Duda	153	514	74	130	27	0	30	92	3	69	135	.253
**Jacob deGrom**	23	46	3	10	2	0	0	2	0	1	13	.217
Kirk Nieuwenhuis	61	112	16	29	14	1	3	16	4	16	39	.259
Bobby Abreu	78	133	12	33	9	0	1	14	1	20	21	.248
Juan Centeno	10	30	1	6	0	0	0	2	0	3	5	.200
Curtis Granderson	155	564	73	128	27	2	20	66	8	79	141	.227
Rubén Tejada	119	355	30	84	11	0	5	34	1	50	73	.237
Eric Young, Jr.	70	217	38	50	9	2	1	12	26	23	52	.230
Travis d'Arnaud	66	232	23	53	11	1	7	26	1	21	45	.228
Wilmer Flores	29	90	5	20	3	0	1	7	0	3	18	.222
Chris Young	82	239	30	50	12	0	8	28	7	24	51	.209
Ike Davis	12	24	4	5	1	0	1	5	0	6	4	.208
Omar Quintanilla	15	29	2	6	1	0	0	3	0	2	5	.207
Anthony Recker	42	127	12	25	7	0	3	14	1	6	43	.197
Andrew Brown	19	44	6	8	1	0	2	7	0	3	15	.182
Daisuke Matsuzaka	28	11	0	2	0	0	0	1	0	1	6	.182
Matt den Dekker	17	45	4	7	2	0	0	1	2	4	13	.156
Taylor Teagarden	9	28	1	4	0	0	1	5	0	2	7	.143
Josh Satin	15	28	1	3	2	0	0	3	0	5	10	.107
Zack Wheeler	24	34	1	2	1	0	0	2	0	1	15	.059
Bartolo Colón	21	41	2	2	1	0	0	0	0	0	23	.049
Jon Niese	19	29	2	1	1	0	0	3	0	5	20	.034
Dillon Gee	12	18	0	0	0	0	0	1	0	2	9	.000
Jenrry Mejia	38	17	0	0	0	0	0	0	0	0	7	.000
Rafael Montero	4	5	0	0	0	0	0	0	0	0	2	.000
Carlos Torres	47	3	0	0	0	0	0	0	0	0	2	.000
Josh Edgin	30	1	0	0	0	0	0	0	0	0	1	.000
Gonzalez Germen	21	1	0	0	0	0	0	0	0	0	1	.000
**Team totals**	**162**	**5472**	**629**	**1306**	**275**	**19**	**125**	**602**	**101**	**516**	**1264**	**.239**

=== Pitching ===
Players bolded are currently on the Mets active roster.
Note: G = Games pitched; GS = Games started; W = Wins; L = Losses; SV = Saves; IP = Innings pitched; H = Hits; R = Runs; ER = Earned runs allowed; BB = Walks allowed; K = Strikeouts; ERA = Earned run average;

Player	G	GS	W	L	SV	IP	H	R	ER	BB	K	ERA
Buddy Carlyle	6	0	1	0	0	9.0	5	1	1	3	11	1.00
Jeurys Familia	51	0	2	3	1	54.0	40	16	11	20	45	1.83
Vic Black	28	0	2	3	0	24.0	17	6	5	13	23	1.88
Dana Eveland	18	0	0	1	0	18.0	15	4	4	4	15	2.00
Josh Edgin	30	0	1	0	0	17.1	12	5	4	3	14	2.08
**Jacob deGrom**	22	22	9	6	0	140.1	117	44	42	43	144	2.69
Carlos Torres	47	0	5	4	2	65.1	66	22	22	23	68	3.03
Kyle Farnsworth	19	0	0	3	3	17.0	18	6	6	6	10	3.18
Jon Niese	19	19	5	6	0	114.1	113	45	41	32	84	3.23
Zack Wheeler	23	22	6	8	0	127.2	119	56	51	51	125	3.60
Jenrry Mejia	38	7	5	3	15	69.1	69	31	28	33	72	3.63
Dillon Gee	12	12	4	4	0	76.1	63	32	32	21	53	3.77
Daisuke Matsuzaka	28	9	3	3	1	74.1	55	34	32	44	71	3.87
Bartolo Colón	31	31	15	13	0	202.1	218	97	92	30	151	4.09
Gonzalez Germen	21	0	0	0	0	26.1	26	14	14	11	26	4.78
Rafael Montero	4	4	0	2	0	20.0	25	13	12	11	17	5.40
José Valverde	21	0	1	1	2	20.2	24	16	13	10	23	5.66
Scott Rice	32	0	1	2	0	13.2	15	9	9	12	13	5.93
Bobby Parnell	1	0	0	0	0	1.0	2	1	1	1	1	9.00
John Lannan	5	0	1	0	0	4.0	7	7	7	2	2	15.75
**Team totals**	**162**	**162**	**79**	**83**	**42**	**1463.2**	**1370**	**618**	**568**	**509**	**1303**	**3.49**

== Farm system ==
Level	Team	League	Manager
AAA	Las Vegas 51s	Pacific Coast League	Wally Backman
AA	Binghamton Mets	Eastern League	Pedro López
A	St. Lucie Mets	Florida State League	Ryan Ellis
A	Savannah Sand Gnats	South Atlantic League	Luis Rojas
A-Short Season	Brooklyn Cyclones	New York–Penn League	Tom Gamboa
Rookie	Kingsport Mets	Appalachian League	José Leger
Rookie	GCL Mets	Gulf Coast League	José Carreño

LEAGUE CHAMPIONS: Binghamton
