= Ed Lucas (baseball) =

American baseball player and coach (born 1982)

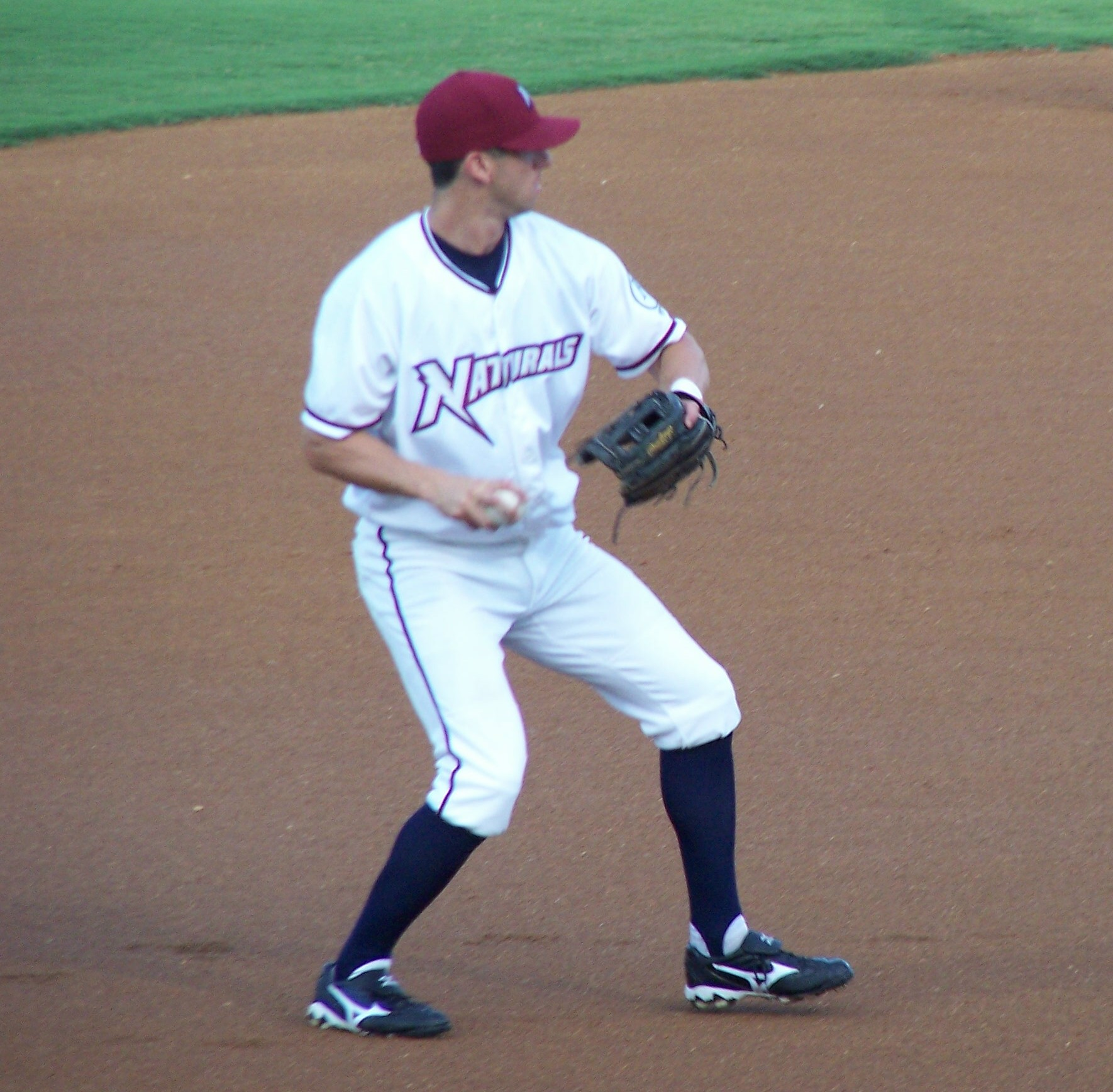
- Lucas with the Northwest Arkansas Naturals in 2008

San Francisco Giants
- Third baseman / Coach
- Born: May 21, 1982 (age 44); Grand Rapids, Michigan, U.S.
- Batted: Right Threw: Right

MLB debut
- May 30, 2013, for the Miami Marlins

Last MLB appearance
- September 26, 2014, for the Miami Marlins

MLB statistics
- Batting average: .255
- Home runs: 5
- Runs batted in: 37
- Stats at Baseball Reference

Teams
- As player: Miami Marlins (2013–2014); As coach: Miami Marlins (2015-2018); Philadelphia Phillies (2019–2020); Milwaukee Brewers (2020); San Francisco Giants (2021–present)

Edward Lee Lucas (born May 21, 1982) is an American former professional baseball third baseman and current Assistant Director of Player Development for the San Francisco Giants. He played in Major League Baseball (MLB) for the Miami Marlins.

After graduating from Dartmouth College in 2004, Lucas played in minor league baseball through 2013, when he made his Major League Baseball (MLB) debut with the Miami Marlins.

== Playing career ==
=== Amateur ===
Lucas attended Spruce Creek High School in Port Orange, Florida, and Dartmouth College. He graduated from Dartmouth in 2004 with a degree in sociology and economics. Lucas played college baseball for the Dartmouth Big Green under head coach Bob Whalen; and also played American football in his freshman year. Lucas won the Ivy League batting title as a senior, and was named Ivy League Player of the Year and received honors as Dartmouth's Most Outstanding Male Athlete of the Year.

=== Kansas City Royals ===
The Kansas City Royals selected Lucas in the eighth round of the 2004 Major League Baseball draft. As Lucas could not return to college, he had little leverage in negotiations, and received a $1,000 signing bonus. He made his minor league baseball debut with the Idaho Falls Chukars of the Rookie-level Pioneer League, and earned $101 a month after expenses. Needing to work during the offseason, Lucas took jobs in construction, substitute teaching, bartending, and as a temp for the Charles Schwab Corporation.

Lucas had a .307 batting average for the Omaha Royals of the Triple-A Pacific Coast League (PCL) in 2010, but the Royals did not promote him to the major leagues.

=== Atlanta Braves ===
On November 22, 2010, Lucas signed a minor league contract with the Atlanta Braves that included an invitation to spring training. He played for the Mississippi Braves of the Double-A Southern League and Gwinnett Braves of the Triple-A International League in 2011, but had a .238 batting average.

=== Los Angeles Angels ===
He signed with the Los Angeles Angels of Anaheim for the 2012 season, which he spent with the Salt Lake Bees of the PCL, batting .262.

=== Miami Marlins ===
In 2013, Lucas signed with the Miami Marlins. After batting .304 in his first 46 games with the New Orleans Zephyrs of the PCL, the Marlins promoted Lucas to the major leagues for the first time on May 29, 2013. He played in 94 total games, hitting .256, with 4 home runs and 28 runs batted in. The next season, Lucas continued his utility role, batting .251 in 69 games.

=== Texas Rangers ===
Lucas was claimed off waivers by the Texas Rangers on October 10, 2014.

=== Seattle Mariners ===
On December 11, 2015, Lucas signed a minor league contract with the Seattle Mariners. He was released on May 18, 2016.

=== Arizona Diamondbacks ===
On May 20, 2016, Lucas signed a minor league contract with the Arizona Diamondbacks organization. In 83 games for the Triple–A Reno Aces, he batted .250/.332/.346 with two home runs and 12 RBI. Lucas elected free agency following the season on November 7.

== Post-playing career ==
Lucas was hired in December 2016 as an administrative coach with the Miami Marlins. He is now the Director of Player Development for the San Francisco Giants.

== Personal life ==
Lucas was born in Grand Rapids, Michigan and raised in Deltona, Florida. His parents are Ed and Sallie Lucas and he has one younger sister, Stevie Lucas. He is married. His wife, Holly Meyer Lucas, gave birth to their first child in September 2013 and second in September 2015. Holly is a realtor and owner of the Meyer Lucas Team at Compass in Jupiter, Florida. Her clients include notable professional athletes, baseball players and coaches with the Miami Marlins, St. Louis Cardinals, Houston Astros and Washington Nationals organizations.
