= Jenrry Mejía =

Dominican baseball player (born 1989)

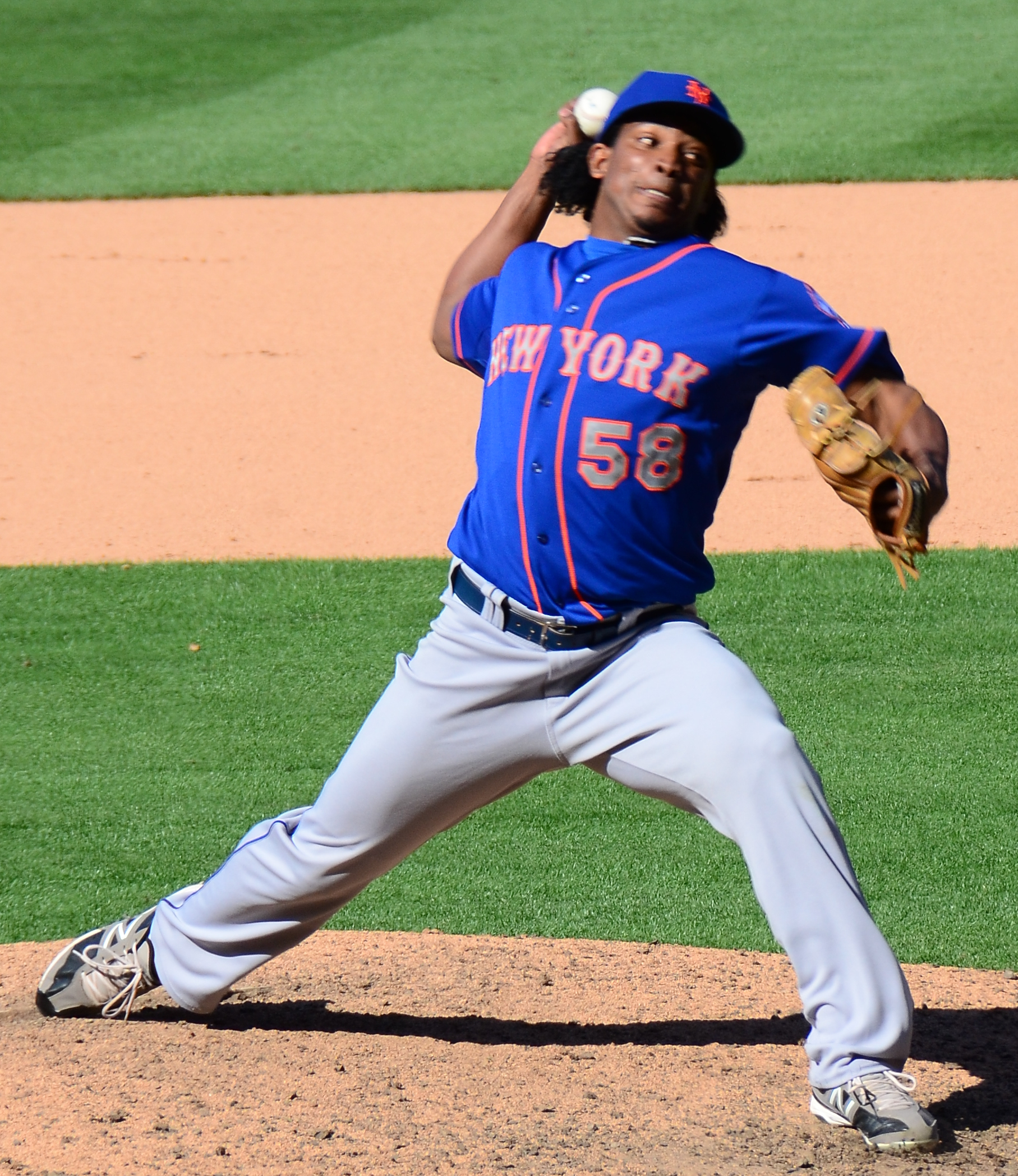
- Mejía with the New York Mets in 2014

Delfines de La Guaira – No. 51
- Pitcher
- Born: October 11, 1989 (age 37); Azua, Dominican Republic
- Bats: Right Throws: Right

MLB debut
- April 7, 2010, for the New York Mets

MLB statistics (through 2015 season)
- Win–loss record: 9–14
- Earned run average: 3.68
- Strikeouts: 162
- Saves: 28
- Stats at Baseball Reference

Teams
- New York Mets (2010, 2012–2015)

Jenrry Manuel Mejía (Spanish pronunciation: [ˈxenri meˈxi.a]; born October 11, 1989) is a Dominican professional baseball pitcher for the Delfines de La Guaira of the Venezuelan Major League. He has previously played in Major League Baseball (MLB) for the New York Mets.

Mejía signed with the Mets as an international free agent on April 4, 2007. He made his MLB debut in 2010 and was named the Mets' closer in May 2014. Mejía was suspended for the first 80 games of the 2015 season after testing positive for performance-enhancing drugs (PED). He received his second suspension in July 2015 after a second failed test. He tested positive for a third time, which was reported in February 2016, resulting in his permanent suspension from MLB. He was the first player to receive a permanent suspension due to violating MLB's drug policy three times. Mejía later submitted an application for reinstatement, as allowed under MLB's drug policy, which was granted by Commissioner Rob Manfred in July 2018.

== Early life ==
Mejía was born in Azua in the southwestern Dominican Republic. Growing up, Mejía lived with his parents and younger brother in a neighborhood called Herrera, near Santo Domingo's former airport of the same name. Starting at age 11, he made his living by shining shoes, earning about 300 pesos a day. When he was 15 years old, he started playing baseball, becoming interested in the sport once he realized that players were able to earn a large signing bonus. He drew some interest from several teams, including the Boston Red Sox and New York Yankees, but was not seen at that time as a top talent, because he was small and slight of build. He ultimately signed with the New York Mets for $16,500 in 2007, at the age of 17.

== Professional career ==
=== New York Mets ===
==== Minor leagues ====
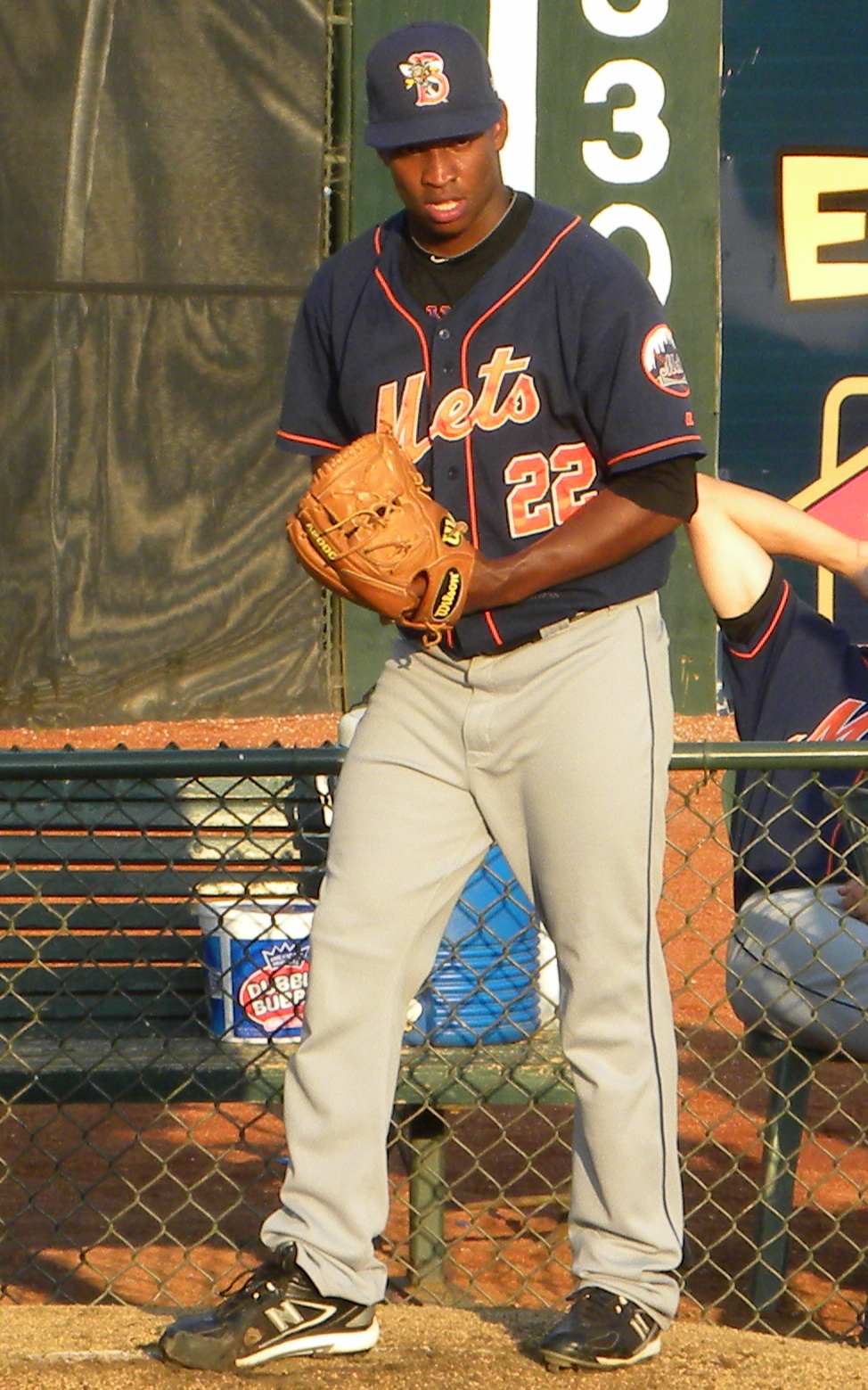
Mejía with the Binghamton Mets in 2010

In 2007, Mejía played for the Dominican Summer League Mets. He recorded a 2–3 record with a 2.47 ERA 14 games (7 starts). The next year, Mejía pitched for the Gulf Coast League Mets and the Brooklyn Cyclones. His combined statistics were a 5–2 record, with a 2.89 ERA in 14 starts.

Mejía started the 2009 season pitching for the Single-A St. Lucie Mets. He was 4–1 with a 1.97 ERA. Then, he was promoted to the Double-A Binghamton Mets. There he posted a 0–5 record with a 4.47 ERA in 10 starts. He also missed seven weeks with a strained middle finger on his pitching hand. Mejía had a 4–6 record with a 3.14 ERA in 19 total starts. Because of his success in the 2009 season, he was named the 48th best prospect in the major leagues in the MLB.com Midseason Top 50 Prospect list. After the 2009 season, the Mets assigned him to the Surprise Rafters of the Arizona Fall League, where he posted a 12.56 ERA in six starts. In February 2010, Mejía was ranked as the 56th best prospect in all of baseball by Baseball America.

==== 2010 ====
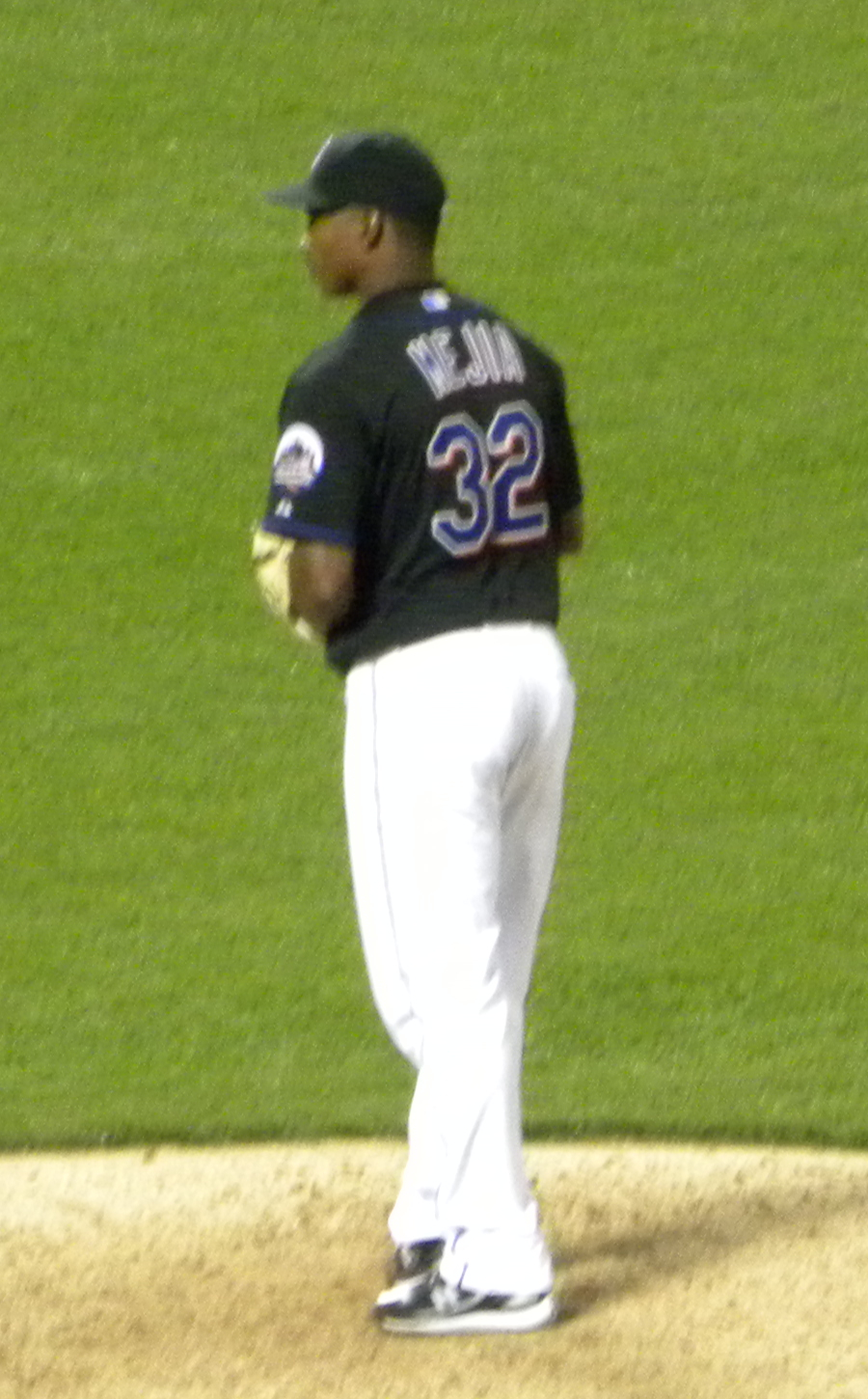
Mejía with the New York Mets in 2010

Mejía made the Mets 2010 opening day roster as a relief pitcher, at only 20 years old, making him the youngest Met to make an Opening Day roster since Dwight Gooden. He made his major league debut on April 7, 2010. After posting a 2.60 ERA in 30 relief appearances, on June 20, 2010, Mejía was optioned to Double-A Binghamton to become a starter, with Bobby Parnell taking his spot in the Mets bullpen. Mejía was recalled from Triple-A Buffalo on September 1. On September 4, Mejía made his first major league start for the Mets at Wrigley Field against the Chicago Cubs. Mike Nickeas, who caught Mejía, also made his debut in the majors on the same day.

==== 2011–2012 ====
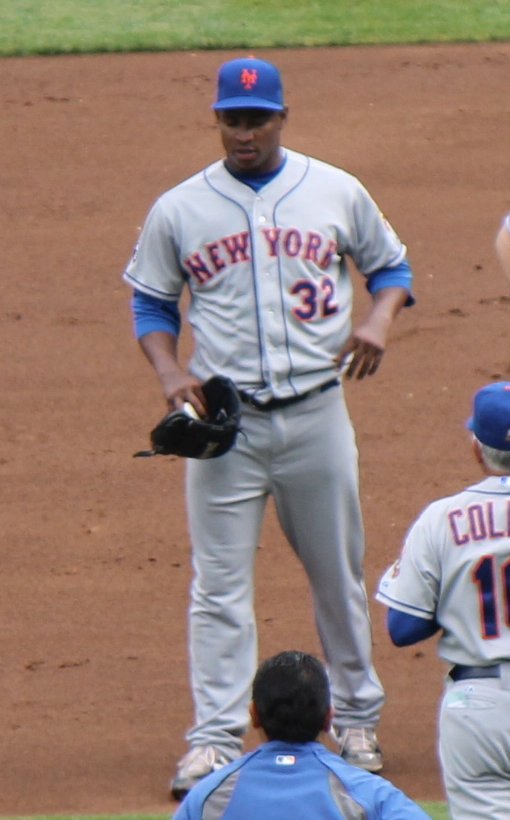
Mejía with the New York Mets in 2012

After starting five games for the Mets' Triple-A affiliate in Buffalo, on April 29, 2011, Mejía left the game after four innings due to elbow discomfort. He was diagnosed a few days later with a complete tear of his ulnar collateral ligament and required Tommy John surgery, which put him out of reach for the remainder of the 2011 season. Mejía missed much of the 2012 season due to recovery from Tommy John surgery.

==== 2013 ====
Mejía began the 2013 season on the 60-day disabled list. He was activated on July 26, 2013, and started the first game of a day-night doubleheader against the Washington Nationals at Nationals Park. He pitched 7 scoreless innings, giving up 7 hits, striking out 7, and walking none en route to his first win of the season.

==== 2014 ====
In 2014, Mejía won the Mets' fifth starter role out of spring training, beating out Daisuke Matsuzaka and John Lannan. Mejía's first start and win came on April 4 at Citi Field against the Cincinnati Reds in which he went 6 innings striking out 8 and allowing 4 hits, 1 run, and 5 walks. After struggling in seven starts, Mejía was moved into the bullpen on May 12. The Mets began using Mejía as the closer, after the release of former closers Kyle Farnsworth and José Valverde. On May 25, Mejía played a key role in a double header against the Arizona Diamondbacks. In the first game, Mejía gave up a run off a fielder's choice to Diamondbacks shortstop Chris Owings in the top of the 9th inning. The Mets would go on to lose the first game 2–1. However, in the second game, Mejía again pitched the 9th inning, this time earning his 3rd save of the season in a 4–2 Mets victory. Mejía earned 28 saves in 31 chances on the season. As closer, Mejia was known for a distinctive stomp to celebrate completing a save.

==== 2015 ====
On Opening Day, Mejía was warming up for a 9th inning save, but injured his elbow. He was placed on the 15-day disabled list the next day with elbow inflammation, retroactive to April 5. On April 11, it was announced that Mejía was suspended for 80 games by MLB after testing positive for use of stanozolol, a performance-enhancing drug (PED). Despite returning to the Mets in July, Mejía was replaced as closer by Jeurys Familia. On July 28, 2015, Major League Baseball announced that Mejía had been suspended for 162 games after failing a test for stanozolol and Boldenone.

==== 2016–2018: Indefinite ban and reinstatement ====
On January 25, 2016, the Mets re-signed Mejía to a one-year deal for $2.47 million, avoiding arbitration. However, due to his 162-game suspension, he would have only received a portion of that salary, since he would have to miss the first 99 games of the season. On February 12, MLB announced that Mejía had tested positive for Boldenone, again. He was the second player to have three positive tests, after Neifi Pérez. As this was his third positive test for anabolic steroids, he was automatically banned from MLB for life. He became the first person to be banned for life due to multiple PED use offenses. He was also one of only four living people to be permanently banned, the others being Pete Rose in 1990, along with Chris Correa and John Coppolella in 2017. Mejía claimed that he only failed one test, and that MLB pressured him to reveal where he obtained the PEDs after the second positive test, which he considered to be inaccurate. He further claimed that MLB conspired to engineer the third positive test.

Mejía was eligible to petition Commissioner Rob Manfred for reinstatement after one year. However, he was required to sit out a minimum of two years, meaning that he would not be eligible to return until 2018 at the earliest. The Mets and Mejía did agree to a contract for the 2017 season, despite the fact that Mejía was not eligible to play and did not receive any salary in 2017. On November 1, 2017, Mejía returned to professional baseball when he signed a contract to play in the Venezuela Winter League for the Navegantes del Magallanes. He pitched 9 1/3 innings across six games, finishing with a 3.86 ERA, but allowed eight hits and issued 12 walks.

On July 6, 2018, MLB announced that Mejía was being reinstated, and was allowed to have "non-public workouts at Mets facilities" after the 2018 MLB All-Star Game. He subsequently made two appearances with the Dominican Summer League Mets, pitching a total of seven innings without allowing any runs. The Mets released Mejía on November 20, 2018, the deadline for the team to protect Mejía from being picked by other clubs in the Rule 5 draft by adding him to their 40-man roster, which the Mets declined to do.

=== Boston Red Sox ===
On January 30, 2019, Mejía signed a minor league contract with the Boston Red Sox. After spending spring training with Boston, he was assigned to the Triple–A Pawtucket Red Sox, and also made appearances with the Double–A Portland Sea Dogs and Low–A Lowell Spinners. Overall during 2019, Mejía was 2–8 with eight saves and a 6.02 ERA, with 58 strikeouts in 55 1/3 innings. He elected free agency following the season on November 4.

=== Algodoneros de Unión Laguna ===
On February 7, 2020, Mejía signed with the Algodoneros de Unión Laguna of the Mexican League. He did not play in a game in 2020 due to the cancellation of the Mexican League season because of the COVID-19 pandemic.

Mejía returned to action in 2021, appearing in 26 games and posting a 2–3 record and 3.81 ERA with 26 strikeouts and 14 saves over 28 1/3 innings of work. He made 6 appearances for the team in 2022, struggling to an 0–2 record and 13.50 ERA with 4 strikeouts across 4 innings pitched.

=== Pericos de Puebla ===
On May 12, 2022, Mejía was traded to the Pericos de Puebla of the Mexican League. In 7 games for Saltillo, he struggled to a 1–2 record and 18.56 ERA with 7 strikeouts and 2 saves over 5 1/3 innings of work. Mejía was released by the Pericos on June 4.

=== Saraperos de Saltillo ===
On June 7, 2022, Mejía signed with the Saraperos de Saltillo of the Mexican League. In 20 relief appearances, he posted a 2–1 record with a 3.18 ERA and 16 strikeouts in 22 2/3 innings.

In 2023, Mejía transitioned from a relief pitcher to a starter. In 8 starts, he registered a 1–3 record with a 5.89 ERA and 26 strikeouts over 36 2/3 innings pitched. Mejía was waived on July 3, 2023.

Mejía re-signed with the Saraperos on February 24, 2024. In 28 appearances for the team, he logged a 2–1 record and 3.37 ERA with 28 strikeouts across 26 2/3 innings pitched.

Mejía made two appearances for Saltillo in 2025, allowing six runs (five earned) on four hits with one strikeout across 1/3 of an inning. He was released by the Saraperos on April 23, 2025.

=== Charros de Jalisco ===
On May 24, 2025, Mejía signed with the Charros de Jalisco of the Mexican League. In 10 relief appearances for Jalisco, he registered a 4.22 ERA with eight strikeouts and one walk. On February 17, 2026, Mejía was released by the Charros.

=== Delfines de La Guaira ===
In February 2026, Mejía signed with the Delfines de La Guaira of the Venezuelan Major League.

== Pitching style ==
Mejía throws a total of five pitches. His primary pitch is a natural cut fastball, created by his three-quarters arm angle. As a prospect, his fastball averaged 94 to 96 miles per hour. Mejía also throws a curveball, slider, changeup, and sinker. He retained the use of all five pitches, even as a reliever.

== See also ==
- List of Major League Baseball players suspended for performance-enhancing drugs
- List of people banned from Major League Baseball
