= 2014 Minnesota Twins season =

2014 Minnesota Twins
- League: American League
- Division: Central
- Ballpark: Target Field
- City: Minneapolis, Minnesota
- Record: 70–92 (.432)
- Divisional place: 5th
- Owners: Jim Pohlad
- General managers: Terry Ryan
- Managers: Ron Gardenhire
- Television: Fox Sports North (Dick Bremer, Bert Blyleven, Jack Morris, Roy Smalley)
- Radio: KTWN-FM (Cory Provus, Dan Gladden, Kris Atteberry)
- Stats: ESPN.com; Baseball Reference

The 2014 Minnesota Twins season was the 54th season for the franchise in Minnesota, and the 114th overall in the American League. They were the host team for the 2014 Major League Baseball All-Star Game. They finished fifth in the American League Central with a 70–92 record. The Twins also hosted the All-Star Game on July 15. It was their final season under manager Ron Gardenhire, who was fired shortly after the season ended.

== Spring training ==
The Twins recorded a 9–16 win–loss record in pre-season spring training, the worst among American League teams. Three of their games finished tied and were therefore not included in the standings.

== Regular season ==
On July 15, the 85th edition of the Mid-Summer Classic returned to the Twin Cities. Previous All-Star games were held at Metropolitan Stadium (1965) and the Hubert H. Humphrey Metrodome (1984). Twins Glen Perkins and Kurt Suzuki—in his first All-Star appearance—represented the hometown team. The battery-mates were called into action for the ninth, and closed down the National League All-Stars on nine pitches for a 5–3 AL win. Perkins, a two-time All-Star, earned the save.

On August 20, second baseman Brian Dozier joined the Twins '20/20' club, adding his name to the five others that have connected for twenty homers in the same season they've stolen twenty bases. The small club includes Larry Hisle (1977), Kirby Puckett (1986), Marty Cordova (1995), Corey Koskie (2001) and Torii Hunter (twice, 2002 and 2004).

The August 24 game against Detroit was the longest Minnesota 9-inning game in history, in terms of time. The Sunday afternoon game at Target Field ran 4 hours and 10 minutes, and resulted in a 13–4 win for the Tigers.

In the first game of the September 13 doubleheader, starter Phil Hughes set a personal best in striking out eleven Chicago batters before being replaced in the eighth inning. (It had been 379 games since a Twin had posted double-digit strikeouts.) Michael Tonkin struck out another in the eighth. The three White Sox pitchers struck out 17 Twins, and the combined total of 29 strikeouts set a Minnesota record for a nine-inning game involving the Twins.

Phil Hughes's contract called for a $500,000 bonus if he reached 210 innings pitched. On September 24, he pitched 8 innings before an hour-long rain delay. Ron Gardenhire replaced him with a fresh pitcher when play resumed—and Hughes's inning tally halted at 209 2/3. He declined to be inserted in a later game to achieve one more out.

At season's end, Phil Hughes's strikeout-to-walk ratio (186:16) measured at 11.63 to 1. That number is the best-ever in the major leagues, topping the previous best of 143:13 set by Bret Saberhagen in 1984.

On September 29, Ron Gardenhire was fired. In his 13-year tenure as Twins manager he went 1068–1039, for a .507 winning percentage. The legacy he leaves includes the many memories of him being ejected from a game, enough times to rank in Major League's top ten (but far behind Bobby Cox's recorded 132 times).

Native son Paul Molitor was hired on November 3 to replace Gardenhire, becoming the Twins' thirteenth skipper. Molitor was born and raised in Saint Paul, attended the University of Minnesota and spent most of his career with the Milwaukee Brewers. He finished his playing career with three seasons in the 1990s as a Minnesota Twin, and coached and consulted in the organization since retiring. In 2004, he was voted into the Hall of Fame, so with his hiring he joins the only two other men who've been hired as first-time managers after being inducted in the Hall as players -- Ted Williams and Ryne Sandburg.

== Season standings ==
=== American League Central ===
AL Central
Team	W	L	Pct.	GB	Home	Road
Detroit Tigers	90	72	.556	—	45‍–‍36	45‍–‍36
Kansas City Royals	89	73	.549	1	42‍–‍39	47‍–‍34
Cleveland Indians	85	77	.525	5	48‍–‍33	37‍–‍44
Chicago White Sox	73	89	.451	17	40‍–‍41	33‍–‍48
Minnesota Twins	70	92	.432	20	35‍–‍46	35‍–‍46

=== American League Wild Card ===
Division leaders
Team	W	L	Pct.
Los Angeles Angels of Anaheim	98	64	.605
Baltimore Orioles	96	66	.593
Detroit Tigers	90	72	.556

Wild Card teams (Top 2 teams qualify for postseason)
Team	W	L	Pct.	GB
Kansas City Royals	89	73	.549	+1
Oakland Athletics	88	74	.543	—
Seattle Mariners	87	75	.537	1
Cleveland Indians	85	77	.525	3
New York Yankees	84	78	.519	4
Toronto Blue Jays	83	79	.512	5
Tampa Bay Rays	77	85	.475	11
Chicago White Sox	73	89	.451	15
Boston Red Sox	71	91	.438	17
Houston Astros	70	92	.432	18
Minnesota Twins	70	92	.432	18
Texas Rangers	67	95	.414	21

== Record vs. opponents ==
2014 American League record Source: MLB Standings Grid – 2014
Team	BAL	BOS	CWS	CLE	DET	HOU	KC	LAA	MIN	NYY	OAK	SEA	TB	TEX	TOR	NL
Baltimore	—	11–8	5–1	3–4	1–5	4–3	3–4	4–2	4–3	13–6	2–4	5–2	12–7	6–1	11–8	12–8
Boston	8–11	—	4–3	2–5	1–5	4–3	6–1	2–5	4–2	7–12	3–4	1–5	9–10	4–2	7–12	9–11
Chicago	1–5	3–4	—	9–10	9–10	3–3	6–13	1–5	9–10	2–5	4–3	3–4	5–2	2–4	5–2	11–9
Cleveland	4–3	5–2	10–9	—	8–11	5–2	10–9	2–5	11–8	4–3	2–4	2–4	4–2	6–1	2–4	10–10
Detroit	5–1	5–1	10–9	11–8	—	4–3	13–6	3–4	9–10	3–4	5–2	2–4	3–4	4–3	1–5	12–8
Houston	3–4	3–4	3–3	2–5	3–4	—	3–3	7–12	3–3	4–2	8–11	9–10	2–5	11–8	4–3	5–15
Kansas City	4–3	1–6	13–6	9–10	6–13	3–3	—	3–3	11–8	4–3	5–2	2–5	4–2	5–1	4–3	15–5
Los Angeles	2–4	5–2	5–1	5–2	4–3	12–7	3–3	—	7–0	2–4	10–9	7–12	5–2	14–5	5–2	12–8
Minnesota	3–4	2–4	10–9	8–11	10–9	3–3	8–11	0–7	—	3–4	1–6	5–2	2–4	2–5	4–2	9–11
New York	6–13	12–7	5–2	3–4	4–3	2–4	3–4	4–2	4–3	—	2–4	3–3	8–11	4–3	11–8	13–7
Oakland	4–2	4–3	3–4	4–2	2–5	11–8	2–5	9–10	6–1	4–2	—	9–10	4–2	9–10	4–3	13–7
Seattle	2–5	5–1	4–3	4–2	4–2	10–9	5–2	12–7	2–5	3–3	10–9	—	4–3	9–10	4–3	9–11
Tampa Bay	7–12	10–9	2–5	2–4	4–3	5–2	2–4	2–5	4–2	11–8	2–4	3–4	—	5–2	8–11	10–10
Texas	1–6	2–4	4–2	1–6	3–4	8–11	1–5	5–14	5–2	3–4	10–9	10–9	2–5	—	2–4	10–10
Toronto	8–11	12–7	2–5	4–2	5–1	3–4	3–4	2–5	2–4	8–11	3–4	3–4	11–8	4–2	—	13–7

== Game log ==
Legend
Twins Win	Twins Loss	Game postponed

2014 Game Log
March/April: 12–12 (Home: 6–6, Road: 6–6)

#	Date	Opponent	Score	Win	Loss	Save	Attendance	Record
1	March 31	@ White Sox	3–5	Sale (1–0)	Nolasco (0–1)	Lindstrom (1)	37,422	0–1
2	April 2	@ White Sox	6–7 (11)	Belisario (1–0)	Deduno (0–1)	—	10,625	0–2
3	April 3	@ White Sox	10–9	Thielbar (1–0)	Lindstrom (0–1)	Perkins (1)	11,056	1–2
4	April 4	@ Indians	2–7	Outman (1–0)	Pelfrey (0–1)	—	41,274	1–3
5	April 5	@ Indians	7–3	Gibson (1–0)	Carrasco (0–1)	—	14,153	2–3
6	April 6	@ Indians	10–7	Swarzak (1–0)	Wood (0–1)	Perkins (2)	13,104	3–3
7	April 7	Athletics	3–8	Kazmir (2–0)	Correia (0–1)	—	35,837	3–4
8	April 9	Athletics	4–7 (11)	Otero (1–0)	Burton (0–1)	—	22,973	3–5
9	April 10	Athletics	1–6	Straily (1–1)	Pelfrey (0–2)	—	20,650	3–6
10	April 11	Royals	10–1	Gibson (2–0)	Chen (0–1)	—	24,338	4–6
11	April 12	Royals	7–1	Nolasco (1–1)	Shields (0–2)	—	23,963	5–6
12	April 13	Royals	4–3	Fien (1–0)	Crow (0–1)	Perkins (3)	20,878	6–6
13	April 15	Blue Jays	3–9	Loup (1–0)	Hughes (0–1)	—	21,818	6–7
—	April 16	Blue Jays	Postponed (snow). Makeup date April 17.					
14	April 17	Blue Jays	7–0	Gibson (3–0)	Dickey (1–3)	—	20,507	7–7
15	April 17	Blue Jays	9–5	Fien (2–0)	Santos (0–1)	—	20,698	8–7
16	April 18	@ Royals	0–5	Vargas (2–0)	Nolasco (1–2)	—	21,192	8–8
17	April 19	@ Royals	4–5	Chen (1–1)	Correia (0–2)	Holland (6)	24,291	8–9
18	April 20	@ Royals	8–3	Hughes (1–1)	Ventura (1–1)	—	17,710	9–9
19	April 22	@ Rays	3–7	Price (3–1)	Gibson (3–1)	—	11,785	9–10
20	April 23	@ Rays	6–4 (12)	Fien (3–0)	Lueke (0–1)	Perkins (4)	11,993	10–10
21	April 24	@ Rays	9–7	Nolasco (2–2)	Bédard (0–1)	Perkins (5)	13,177	11–10
22	April 25	Tigers	6–10	Porcello (3–1)	Correia (0–3)	—	27,558	11–11
23	April 26	Tigers	5–3	Hughes (2–1)	Ortega (0–1)	Perkins (6)	28,122	12–11
—	April 27	Tigers	Postponed (rain). Makeup date August 23.					
—	April 29	Dodgers	Postponed (rain). Makeup date May 1.					
24	April 30	Dodgers	4–6	Greinke (5–0)	Gibson (3–2)	Jansen (10)	24,588	12–12

May: 13–16 (Home: 7–8, Road: 6–8)

#	Date	Opponent	Score	Win	Loss	Save	Attendance	Record
25	May 1	Dodgers	4–9	Haren (4–0)	Pelfrey (0–3)	Perez (1)	23,306	12–13
26	May 1	Dodgers	3–4 (12)	Wright (2–1)	Duensing (0–1)	Jansen (11)	24,053	12–14
27	May 2	Orioles	0–3	Jiménez (1–4)	Nolasco (2–3)	Hunter (8)	24,165	12–15
28	May 3	Orioles	6–1	Correia (1–3)	Chen (3–2)		25,318	13–15
29	May 4	Orioles	5–2	Hughes (3–1)	González (1–3)	Perkins (7)	25,559	14–15
30	May 5	@ Indians	1–0 (10)	Thielbar (2–0)	Axford (0–3)	Perkins (8)	9,037	15–15
31	May 6	@ Indians	2–4	Tomlin (1–0)	Deduno (0–2)	Shaw (1)	9,621	15–16
32	May 7	@ Indians	3–4	Axford (1–3)	Fien (3–1)		10,742	15–17
33	May 8	@ Indians	4–9	Masterson (2–1)	Correia (1–4)		13,095	15–18
34	May 9	@ Tigers	2–1	Hughes (4–1)	Verlander (4–2)	Perkins (9)	35,814	16–18
35	May 10	@ Tigers	3–9	Scherzer (5–1)	Gibson (3–3)		42,312	16–19
36	May 11	@ Tigers	4–3	Burton (1–1)	Chamberlain (1–2)	Perkins (10)	40,468	17–19
37	May 13	Red Sox	8–6	Perkins (1–0)	Miller (1–1)		23,949	18–19
38	May 14	Red Sox	4–9	Doubront (2–3)	Correia (1–5)		26,802	18–20
39	May 15	Red Sox	4–3 (10)	Duensing (1–1)	Miller (1–2)		29,628	19–20
40	May 16	Mariners	5–4	Gibson (4–3)	Young (3–1)	Perkins (11)	27,275	20–20
41	May 17	Mariners	4–3	Deduno (1–2)	Elías (3–3)	Perkins (12)	29,717	21–20
42	May 18	Mariners	2–6	Hernández (5–1)	Nolasco (2–4)		32,511	21–21
43	May 20	@ Padres	5–3	Correia (2–5)	Kennedy (2–6)	Perkins (13)	19,136	22–21
44	May 21	@ Padres	2–0	Hughes (5–1)	Ross (5–4)	Perkins (14)	16,079	23–21
45	May 23	@ Giants	2–6	Lincecum (4–3)	Gibson (4-4)	Machi (2)	41,514	23–22
46	May 24	@ Giants	1–2	Vogelsong (3–2)	Deduno (1–3)	Romo (16)	41,724	23-23
47	May 25	@ Giants	1–8	Bumgarner (6–3)	Nolasco (2–5)		42,590	23–24
48	May 26	Rangers	7–2	Tepesch (2–0)	Correia (2–6)		30,571	23–25
49	May 27	Rangers	3–4	Perkins (2–0)	Soria (1–2)		22,702	24–25
50	May 28	Rangers	1–0	Tolleson (1-1)	Burton (1–2)	Soria (9)	26,472	24–26
51	May 29	Rangers	5–4	Ogando (2-2)	Fien (3–2)	Soria (10)	28,170	24–27
52	May 30	@ Yankees	6–1	Nolasco (3–5)	Nuño (1–2)		42,245	25–27
53	May 31	@ Yankees	1–3	Tanaka (8–1)	Duensing (1–2)	Robertson (12)	44,346	25–28

June: 12–16 (Home: 7–4, Road: 5–12)

#	Date	Opponent	Score	Win	Loss	Save	Attendance	Record
54	June 1	Yankees	7–2	Hughes (6–1)	Robertson (0–2)	–	42,449	26–28
55	June 2	@ Brewers	2–6	Garza (3–4)	Gibson (4–5)	–	28,708	26–29
56	June 3	@ Brewers	6–4	Deduno (2–3)	Gallardo (3–4)	Perkins (15)	25,634	27–29
57	June 4	Brewers	6–4	Nolasco (4–5)	Wooten (1–3)	Perkins (16)	31,144	28–29
58	June 5	Brewers	5–8	Peralta (5-5)	Correia (2–7)	Rodriguez (18)	35,110	28–30
59	June 6	Astros	4–5	Keuchel (7–3)	Hughes (6–2)	Qualls (7)	29,948	28–31
60	June 7	Astros	8–0	Gibson (5-5)	Feldman (3–4)	–	27,732	29–31
61	June 8	Astros	5–14	Downs (1–0)	Deduno (2–4)	–	31,576	29–32
62	June 9	@ Blue Jays	4–5	Janssen (1–0)	Guerrier (0–1)	–	19,428	29–33
63	June 10	@ Blue Jays	4–0	Correia (3–7)	Happ (5–3)	–	20,681	30–33
64	June 11	@ Blue Jays	7–2	Hughes (7–2)	Stroman (3–1)	–	45,080	31–33
65	June 13	@ Tigers	2–0	Gibson (6–5)	Smyly (3–5)	Perkins (17)	39,811	32–33
66	June 14	@ Tigers	9–12	Sánchez (3–2)	Deduno (2–5)	Krol (1)	41,498	32–34
67	June 15	@ Tigers	3–4	Nathan (3–2)	Fien (3-3)	–	41,462	32–35
68	June 16	@ Red Sox	0–1	De La Rosa (2-2)	Correia (3–8)	Uehara (15)	35,693	32–36
69	June 17	@ Red Sox	1–2	Lester (8–7)	Hughes (7–3)	Mujica (2)	36,835	32–37
70	June 18	@ Red Sox	1–2 (10)	Uehara (2–1)	Fien (3–4)	–	36,489	32–38
71	June 19	White Sox	4–2	Fien (4-4)	Petricka (0–2)	Perkins (18)	31,195	33–38
72	June 20	White Sox	5–4	Perkins (3–0)	Webb (4–1)	–	32,071	34–38
73	June 21	White Sox	4–3	Correia (4–8)	Rienzo (4–5)	Perkins (19)	32,647	35–38
74	June 22	White Sox	6–5	Hughes (8–3)	Danks (6-6)	Burton (1)	30,491	36–38
75	June 24	@ Angels	6–8	Wilson (8–6)	Gibson (6-6)	Smith (6)	37,086	36–39
76	June 25	@ Angels	2–6	Richards (8–2)	Pino (0–1)	–	39,082	36–40
77	June 26	@ Angels	4–6	Weaver (8–6)	Nolasco (4–6)	Smith (7)	32,209	36–41
78	June 27	@ Rangers	4–5	Tepesch (3-3)	Correia (4–9)	–	38,111	36–42
79	June 28	@ Rangers	0–5	Darvish (8–4)	Hughes (8–4)	–	30,620	36–43
80	June 29	@ Rangers	3–2	Gibson (7–6)	Soria (1–3)	Perkins (20)	36,779	37–43
81	June 30	Royals	1–6	Duffy (5–7)	Pino (0–2)	–	28,533	37–44

July: 11–15 (Home: 6–11, Road: 5–4)

#	Date	Opponent	Score	Win	Loss	Save	Attendance	Record
82	July 1	Royals	10–2	Nolasco (5–6)	Shields (8–4)	–	23,383	38–44
83	July 2	Royals	0–4	Vargas (8–3)	Correia (4–10)	–	28,860	38–45
84	July 3	Yankees	4–7	Tanaka (12–3)	Hughes (8–5)	Robertson (19)	34,714	38–46
85	July 4	Yankees	5–6	Huff (2–0)	Gibson (7-7)	Robertson (20)	36,952	38–47
86	July 5	Yankees	2–1 (11)	Duensing (2-2)	Thornton (0–2)	–	36,514	39–47
87	July 6	Yankees	7–9	Kuroda (6-6)	Nolasco (5–7)	Robertson (21)	31,171	39–48
88	July 7	@ Mariners	0–2	Iwakuma (7–4)	Correia (4–11)	Rodney (26)	18,562	39–49
89	July 8	@ Mariners	2–0	Hughes (9–5)	Young (8–5)	Perkins (21)	15,553	40–49
90	July 9	@ Mariners	8–1	Gibson (8–7)	Elias (7–8)	–	16,460	41–49
91	July 10	@ Mariners	4–2	Pino (1–2)	Wilhelmsen (1–2)	Perkins (22)	14,530	42–49
92	July 11	@ Rockies	2–6	de la Rosa (10–6)	Johnson (0–1)	–	36,110	42–50
93	July 12	@ Rockies	9–3	Correia (5–11)	Matzek (1–4)	–	35,930	43–50
94	July 13	@ Rockies	13–5	Hughes (10–5)	Anderson (0–3)	–	35,743	44–50
All–Star Break (July 14–17)
95	July 18	Rays	2–6	Cobb (5–6)	Gibson (8-8)	–	31,058	44–51
96	July 19	Rays	1–5	Price (10–7)	Hughes (10–6)	McGee (8)	36,117	44–52
97	July 20	Rays	3–5	Archer (6–5)	Correia (5–12)	Yates (1)	26,821	44–53
98	July 21	Indians	4–3	Fien (5–4)	Shaw (4–2)	Perkins (23)	25,109	45–53
99	July 22	Indians	2–8	Salazar (2–4)	Pino (1–3)	–	28,291	45–54
100	July 23	Indians	3–1	Swarzak (2–0)	Bauer (4–5)	Perkins (24)	34,608	46–54
101	July 24	White Sox	2–5	Noesí (5–7)	Hughes (10–7)	Petricka (5)	32,952	46–55
102	July 25	White Sox	5–9	Danks (9–6)	Correia (5–13)	–	28,728	46–56
103	July 26	White Sox	0–7	Sale (10–1)	Darnell (0–1)	–	33,005	46–57
104	July 27	White Sox	4–3	Burton (2-2)	Belisario (3–7)	Perkins (25)	27,818	47–57
105	July 29	@ Royals	2–1	Gibson (9–8)	Shields (9–6)	Perkins (26)	30,686	48–57
106	July 30	@ Royals	2–3	Frasor (2–1)	Hughes (10–8)	Holland (28)	20,747	48–58
107	July 31	@ Royals	3–6	Ventura (8-8)	Thielbar (2–1)	Holland (29)	24,127	48–59

August: 11–18 (Home: 5–8, Road: 6–10)

#	Date	Opponent	Score	Win	Loss	Save	Attendance	Record
108	August 1	@ White Sox	8–10	Guerra (1–2)	Fien (5-5)	Petricka (7)	28,060	48–60
109	August 2	@ White Sox	8–6	Pressly (1–0)	Belisario (4–8)	Perkins (27)	27,446	49–60
110	August 3	@ White Sox	16–3	Gibson (10–8)	Guerra (1–3)	–	23,471	50–60
111	August 5	Padres	3–1	Hughes (11–8)	Hahn (7–3)	Perkins (28)	34,495	51–60
112	August 6	Padres	4–5 (10)	Quackenbush (2-2)	Swarzak (2–1)	Benoit (4)	34,567	51–61
113	August 7	@ Athletics	0–3	Lester (12–7)	Pino (1–4)	–	22,108	51–62
114	August 8	@ Athletics	5–6	Kazmir (13–4)	Gibson (10–9)	Doolittle (18)	20,196	51–63
115	August 9	@ Athletics	4–9	Samardzija (5–8)	May (0–1)	–	32,074	51–64
116	August 10	@ Athletics	6–1	Hughes (12–8)	Gregerson (2-2)	–	25,598	52–64
117	August 11	@ Astros	4–2	Duensing (3–2)	Fields (2–5)	Perkins (29)	15,569	53–64
118	August 12	@ Astros	4–10	McHugh (5–9)	Pino (1–5)	–	17,490	53–65
119	August 13	@ Astros	3–1	Gibson (11–9)	Oberholtzer (4–8)	Perkins (30)	16,480	54–65
120	August 15	Royals	5–6	Duffy (8–10)	Nolasco (5–8)	Holland (37)	32,013	54–66
121	August 16	Royals	4–1	Hughes (13–8)	Ventura (9-9)	Perkins (31)	35,575	55–66
122	August 17	Royals	6–12	Guthrie (9–10)	Milone (6–4)	–	31,455	55–67
123	August 18	Royals	4–6	Vargas (10–5)	May (0–2)	Holland (38)	25,559	55–68
124	August 19	Indians	5–7	Crockett (3–0)	Duensing (3-3)	Allen (16)	26,358	55–69
125	August 20	Indians	0–5	House (2–3)	Nolasco (5–9)	–	28,943	55–70
126	August 21	Indians	4–1	Hughes (14–8)	Kluber (13–7)	Perkins (32)	28,033	56–70
127	August 22	Tigers	20–6	Pressly (2–0)	Ray (1–4)	–	29,394	57–70
128	August 23	Tigers	12–4	Pino (2–5)	Farmer (0–1)	–	25,110	58–70
129	August 23	Tigers	6–8	Verlander (11-11)	May (0–3)	Nathan (27)	25,578	58–71
130	August 24	Tigers	4–13	Scherzer (15–4)	Gibson (11–10)	–	23,983	58–72
131	August 26	@ Royals	1–2	Davis (7–2)	Perkins (3–1)	–	13,847	58–73
132	August 27	@ Royals	1–6	Davis (8–2)	Hughes (14–9)	–	17,668	58–74
133	August 28	@ Royals	11–5 (10)	Swarzak (3–1)	Chen (2–4)	–	17,219	59–74
134	August 29	@ Orioles	1–9	González (7-7)	May (0–4)	–	27,464	59–75
135	August 30	@ Orioles	2–3	Miller (5-5)	Burton (2–3)	Britton (30)	30,322	59–76
136	August 31	@ Orioles	8–12	Chen (14–4)	Nolasco (5–10)	Britton (31)	40,905	59–77

September: 11–15 (Home: 6–9, Road: 5–6)

#	Date	Opponent	Score	Win	Loss	Save	Attendance	Record
137	September 1	@ Orioles	6–4	Hughes (15–9)	Gausman (7-7)	Perkins (33)	33,156	60–77
138	September 2	White Sox	3–6 (10)	Webb (6–4)	Oliveros (0–1)	Petricka (11)	23,719	60–78
139	September 3	White Sox	11–4	May (1–4)	Danks (9–10)	–	21,778	61–78
140	September 4	Angels	4–5	Smith (6–2)	Perkins (3–2)	Street (36)	21,914	61–79
141	September 5	Angels	6–7 (10)	Street (2–1)	Burton (2–4)	Jepsen (2)	23,477	61–80
142	September 6	Angels	5–8	Smith (7–2)	Burton (2–5)	Street (37)	28,924	61–81
143	September 7	Angels	4–14	Wilson (11–9)	Darnell (0–2)	–	25,419	61–82
144	September 9	@ Indians	4–3	May (2–4)	Bauer (5–8)	Burton (2)	9,489	62–82
–	September 10	@ Indians	Postponed (rain). Makeup date September 11.					
145	September 11	@ Indians	2–8	Kluber (15–9)	Gibson (11–11)	—	N/A	62–83
146	September 11	@ Indians	0–2	House (3-3)	Nolasco (5–11)	Allen (20)	12,637	62–84
147	September 12	@ White Sox	Postponed (rain). Makeup date September 13.					
147	September 13	@ White Sox	1–5	Quintana (8–10)	Hughes (15–10)	—	N/A	62–85
148	September 13	@ White Sox	6–7	Petricka (1–4)	Perkins (3–3)	–	20,106	62–86
149	September 14	@ White Sox	6–4	May (3–4)	Noesí (8–10)	Perkins (34)	17,044	63–86
150	September 15	Tigers	6–8	Ryan (2–0)	Fien (5–6)	Soria (18)	19,700	63–87
151	September 16	Tigers	4–3	Perkins (4–3)	Nathan (4–4)	–	22,066	64–87
152	September 17	Tigers	8–4	Gibson (12–11)	Price (14–12)	–	22,285	65–87
153	September 19	Indians	5–4	Burton (3–5)	Crockett (4–1)	—	28,400	66–87
154	September 20	Indians	3–7	House (4–3)	May (3–5)	Rzepczynski (1)	28,316	66–88
155	September 21	Indians	2–7	Kluber (17–9)	Swarzak (3–2)	—	24,451	66–89
156	September 22	Diamondbacks	2–6	Collmenter (11–8)	Nolasco (5–12)	—	22,571	66–90
157	September 23	Diamondbacks	6–3	Gibson (13–11)	Chafin (0–1)	—	28,902	67–90
158	September 24	Diamondbacks	2–1	Hughes (16–10)	Nuño (0–1)	Burton (3)	29,445	68–90
159	September 25	@ Tigers	2–4	Scherzer (18–5)	May (3–6)	Nathan (34)	33,077	68–91
160	September 26	@ Tigers	11–4	Achter (1–0)	Porcello (15–13)	—	35,178	69–91
161	September 27	@ Tigers	12–3	Nolasco (6–12)	Lobstein (1–2)	—	38,805	70–91
162	September 28	@ Tigers	3–0	Price (15–12)	Gibson (13–12)	Nathan (35)	40,501	70–92

== Roster ==
2014 Minnesota Twins
Roster
Pitchers: 58 A. J. Achter; 61 Jared Burton; 30 Kevin Correia; 38 Logan Darnell; 21 Samuel Deduno; 52 Brian Duensing; 50 Casey Fien; 44 Kyle Gibson; 54 Matt Guerrier; 45 Phil Hughes; 53 Kris Johnson; 65 Trevor May; 49 Tommy Milone; 47 Ricky Nolasco; 48 Lester Oliveros; 37 Mike Pelfrey; 15 Glen Perkins; 43,63 Yohan Pino; 57 Ryan Pressly; 51 Anthony Swarzak; 56 Caleb Thielbar; 64 Aaron Thompson; 59 Michael Tonkin	Catchers: 26 Eric Fryer; 43 Josmil Pinto; 8 Kurt Suzuki; Infielders: 11 Jason Bartlett; 17 Doug Bernier; 20 Chris Colabello; 2 Brian Dozier; 5 Eduardo Escobar; 25 Pedro Florimón; 7 Joe Mauer; 17 Kendrys Morales; 9 Eduardo Núñez; 24 Trevor Plouffe; 11 Jorge Polanco; 19 Kennys Vargas	Outfielders: 31 Oswaldo Arcia; 1 Sam Fuld; 12 Chris Herrmann; 32 Aaron Hicks; 13 Jason Kubel; 19 Darin Mastroianni; 27 Chris Parmelee; 39 Danny Santana; 1 Jordan Schafer; 16 Josh Willingham	Manager: 35 Ron Gardenhire; Coaches: 40 Rick Anderson (pitching); 23 Tom Brunansky (hitting); 18 Bobby Cuellar (bullpen); 75 Nate Dammann (bullpen catcher); 4 Paul Molitor (infield); 36 Terry Steinbach (bench); 41 Scott Ullger (first base); 46 Joe Vavra (third base)

== Player stats ==
All stats updated through September 28, 2013.

All batting and pitching leaders in each category are in bold.

=== Batting ===
Note: G = Games played; AB = At bats; R = Runs scored; H = Hits; 2B = Doubles; 3B = Triples; HR = Home runs; RBI = Runs batted in; AVG = Batting average; SB = Stolen bases

Player	G	AB	R	H	2B	3B	HR	RBI	AVG	SB
Oswaldo Arcia	103	372	46	86	16	3	20	57	.231	1
Jason Bartlett	3	3	3	0	0	0	0	0	.000	0
Doug Bernier	7	7	2	2	0	0	0	0	.286	0
Chris Colabello	59	205	17	47	13	0	6	39	.229	0
Brian Dozier	**156**	**598**	**112**	**145**	33	1	**23**	71	.242	**21**
Eduardo Escobar	133	433	52	119	35	2	6	37	.275	1
Pedro Florimón	33	76	7	7	1	1	0	1	.092	6
Eric Fryer	28	75	11	16	4	0	1	5	.213	1
Sam Fuld	53	164	15	45	10	0	1	17	.274	12
Chris Herrmann	33	75	8	16	3	0	0	4	.213	1
Aaron Hicks	69	186	22	40	8	0	1	18	.215	4
Jason Kubel	45	156	12	35	6	1	1	13	.224	1
Darin Mastroianni	7	11	3	0	0	0	0	0	.000	1
Joe Mauer	120	455	60	126	27	2	4	55	.277	3
Kendrys Morales	39	154	12	36	11	0	1	18	.234	0
Eduardo Núñez	72	204	26	51	7	4	4	24	.250	9
Chris Parmelee	87	250	27	64	11	0	7	28	.256	0
Josmil Pinto	57	169	25	37	8	0	7	18	.219	0
Trevor Plouffe	136	520	69	134	**40**	2	14	**80**	.258	2
Jorge Polanco	5	6	2	2	1	1	0	3	.333	0
Danny Santana	101	405	70	129	27	**7**	7	40	.319	20
Jordan Schafer	41	130	17	37	5	1	1	13	.285	15
Kurt Suzuki	131	452	37	130	34	0	3	61	**.288**	0
Kennys Vargas	53	215	26	59	10	1	9	38	.274	0
Josh Willingham	68	224	34	47	5	1	12	34	.210	1
Pitcher totals	162	22	0	2	1	0	0	1	.091	0
**Team totals**	**162**	**5567**	**715**	**1412**	**316**	**27**	**128**	**675**	**.254**	**99**

=== Pitching ===
Note: W = Wins; L = Losses; ERA = Earned run average; G = Games pitched; GS = Games started; SV = Saves; IP = Innings pitched; R = Runs allowed; ER = Earned runs allowed; BB = Walks allowed; K = Strikeouts

Player	W	L	ERA	G	GS	SV	IP	R	ER	BB	K
A.J. Achter	1	0	3.27	7	0	0	11.0	7	4	3	5
Jared Burton	3	5	4.36	68	0	3	64.0	34	31	25	46
Kevin Correia	5	**13**	4.94	23	23	0	129.1	76	71	32	61
Logan Darnell	0	2	7.13	7	4	0	24.0	20	19	8	22
Samuel Deduno	2	5	4.60	30	8	0	92.0	49	47	41	74
Brian Duensing	3	3	3.31	62	0	0	54.1	20	20	20	33
Casey Fien	5	6	3.98	**73**	0	1	63.1	29	28	10	51
Kyle Gibson	13	12	4.47	31	31	0	179.1	91	89	**57**	107
Matt Guerrier	0	1	3.86	27	0	0	28.0	12	12	10	12
Phil Hughes	**16**	10	**3.52**	32	**32**	0	**209.2**	88	82	16	**186**
Kris Johnson	0	1	4.73	3	3	0	13.1	7	7	9	12
Trevor May	3	6	7.88	10	9	0	45.2	41	40	22	44
Tommy Milone	0	1	7.06	6	5	0	21.2	21	17	11	14
Ricky Nolasco	6	12	5.38	27	27	0	159.0	**96**	**95**	38	115
Lester Oliveros	0	1	7.11	7	0	0	6.1	5	5	3	5
Mike Pelfrey	0	3	7.99	5	5	0	23.2	23	21	18	10
Glen Perkins	4	3	3.65	63	0	**34**	61.2	29	25	11	66
Yohan Pino	2	5	5.07	11	11	0	60.1	37	34	14	50
Ryan Pressly	2	0	2.86	25	0	0	28.1	10	9	8	14
Anthony Swarzak	3	2	4.60	50	4	0	86.0	48	44	28	47
Caleb Thielbar	2	1	3.40	54	0	0	47.2	19	18	16	35
Aaron Thompson	0	0	2.45	7	0	0	7.1	2	2	2	6
Michael Tonkin	0	0	4.74	25	0	0	19.0	13	10	6	16
**Team totals**	**70**	**92**	**4.57**	**162**	**162**	**38**	**1435.0**	**777**	**728**	**408**	**1031**

== Other post-season awards ==
- Calvin R. Griffith Award (Most Valuable Twin) – Phil Hughes
- Joseph W. Haynes Award (Twins Pitcher of the Year) – Phil Hughes
- Bill Boni Award (Twins Outstanding Rookie) – Danny Santana
- Charles O. Johnson Award (Most Improved Twin) – Eduardo Escobar
- Jim Kaat Award (Defensive Player of the Year) – Brian Dozier
- Dick Siebert Award (Upper Midwest Player of the Year) – Pat Neshek
- Bob Allison Award (Leadership Award) – Kurt Suzuki
- Mike Augustin Award ("Media Good Guy" Award) – Ron Gardenhire
  - The above awards are voted on by the Twin Cities chapter of the BBWAA
- Carl R. Pohlad Award (Outstanding Community Service) – Brian Duensing
- Sherry Robertson Award (Twins Outstanding Farm System Position Player) – Kennys Vargas
- Jim Rantz Award (Twins Outstanding Farm System Pitcher) – José Berríos
- Kirby Puckett Award (Alumni Community Service) – Jim Kaat
- Herb Carneal Award (Lifetime Achievement Award) – none

== Awards and honors ==
All-Star Game

- Kurt Suzuki, Catcher, Reserve
- Glen Perkins, Pitcher, Reserve

== Farm system ==
Level	Team	League	Manager
AAA	Rochester Red Wings	International League	Gene Glynn
AA	New Britain Rock Cats	Eastern League	Jeff Smith
A	Fort Myers Miracle	Florida State League	Doug Mientkiewicz
A	Cedar Rapids Kernels	Midwest League	Jake Mauer
Rookie	Elizabethton Twins	Appalachian League	Ray Smith
Rookie	GCL Twins	Gulf Coast League	Ramon Borrego

LEAGUE CHAMPIONS: Fort Myers
