= 2014 Seattle Mariners season =

Major League Baseball season

2014 Seattle Mariners
- League: American League
- Division: West
- Ballpark: Safeco Field
- City: Seattle, Washington
- Record: 87–75 (.537)
- Divisional place: 3rd
- Owners: Nintendo of America (represented by Howard Lincoln)
- General manager: Jack Zduriencik
- Manager: Lloyd McClendon
- Television: Root Sports Northwest (Dave Sims, Mike Blowers)
- Radio: ESPN-710; Seattle Mariners Radio Network (Rick Rizzs, Aaron Goldsmith)

The 2014 Seattle Mariners season was the 38th season in franchise history. The Mariners played their 15th full season (16th overall) at Safeco Field. They were competitive all season, being eliminated from postseason contention on the last day of the season. Seattle finished in third place in the American League West with a 87–75 record, their first winning season since 2009.

== Offseason ==
The Mariners Lloyd McClendon in November 2013 to replace Eric Wedge as manager. McClendon previously led the Pittsburgh Pirates from 2001 to 2005.

The Mariners signed second baseman Robinson Canó to a 10-year, $240 million contract, tied for the third-largest contract in MLB history at the time in December. Canó received a seven-year, $175 million contract offer to return to the New York Yankees but turned it down in search of a bigger deal.

=== Other notable transactions ===
- December 5, 2013: Willie Bloomquist signed a two-year, $5.8 million contract to return to the Mariners.
- December 11: Traded Carter Capps to the Miami Marlins for Logan Morrison.
- December 13: Corey Hart signed a one-year, $6 million contract with the Mariners.
- December 18: Franklin Gutiérrez re-signed with Seattle.
- January 6, 2014: Humberto Quintero signed as a free agent with the Mariners.
- January 16: John Buck signed as a free agent with Seattle.
- January 17: Joe Beimel signed as a free agent with the Mariners.
- January 23: Endy Chávez re-signed with the Mariners.
- January 29: Carlos Peguero's contract sold to the Kansas City Royals.
- February 13: Fernando Rodney signed a two-year, $14 million contract with the Mariners.

== Regular season ==
=== Standings ===
==== American League West ====
AL West
Team	W	L	Pct.	GB	Home	Road
Los Angeles Angels of Anaheim	98	64	.605	—	52‍–‍29	46‍–‍35
Oakland Athletics	88	74	.543	10	48‍–‍33	40‍–‍41
Seattle Mariners	87	75	.537	11	41‍–‍40	46‍–‍35
Houston Astros	70	92	.432	28	38‍–‍43	32‍–‍49
Texas Rangers	67	95	.414	31	33‍–‍48	34‍–‍47

==== American League Wild Card ====
Division leaders
Team	W	L	Pct.
Los Angeles Angels of Anaheim	98	64	.605
Baltimore Orioles	96	66	.593
Detroit Tigers	90	72	.556

Wild Card teams (Top 2 teams qualify for postseason)
Team	W	L	Pct.	GB
Kansas City Royals	89	73	.549	+1
Oakland Athletics	88	74	.543	—
Seattle Mariners	87	75	.537	1
Cleveland Indians	85	77	.525	3
New York Yankees	84	78	.519	4
Toronto Blue Jays	83	79	.512	5
Tampa Bay Rays	77	85	.475	11
Chicago White Sox	73	89	.451	15
Boston Red Sox	71	91	.438	17
Houston Astros	70	92	.432	18
Minnesota Twins	70	92	.432	18
Texas Rangers	67	95	.414	21

==== Record against opponents ====
2014 American League record Source: MLB Standings Grid – 2014
Team	BAL	BOS	CWS	CLE	DET	HOU	KC	LAA	MIN	NYY	OAK	SEA	TB	TEX	TOR	NL
Baltimore	—	11–8	5–1	3–4	1–5	4–3	3–4	4–2	4–3	13–6	2–4	5–2	12–7	6–1	11–8	12–8
Boston	8–11	—	4–3	2–5	1–5	4–3	6–1	2–5	4–2	7–12	3–4	1–5	9–10	4–2	7–12	9–11
Chicago	1–5	3–4	—	9–10	9–10	3–3	6–13	1–5	9–10	2–5	4–3	3–4	5–2	2–4	5–2	11–9
Cleveland	4–3	5–2	10–9	—	8–11	5–2	10–9	2–5	11–8	4–3	2–4	2–4	4–2	6–1	2–4	10–10
Detroit	5–1	5–1	10–9	11–8	—	4–3	13–6	3–4	9–10	3–4	5–2	2–4	3–4	4–3	1–5	12–8
Houston	3–4	3–4	3–3	2–5	3–4	—	3–3	7–12	3–3	4–2	8–11	9–10	2–5	11–8	4–3	5–15
Kansas City	4–3	1–6	13–6	9–10	6–13	3–3	—	3–3	11–8	4–3	5–2	2–5	4–2	5–1	4–3	15–5
Los Angeles	2–4	5–2	5–1	5–2	4–3	12–7	3–3	—	7–0	2–4	10–9	7–12	5–2	14–5	5–2	12–8
Minnesota	3–4	2–4	10–9	8–11	10–9	3–3	8–11	0–7	—	3–4	1–6	5–2	2–4	2–5	4–2	9–11
New York	6–13	12–7	5–2	3–4	4–3	2–4	3–4	4–2	4–3	—	2–4	3–3	8–11	4–3	11–8	13–7
Oakland	4–2	4–3	3–4	4–2	2–5	11–8	2–5	9–10	6–1	4–2	—	9–10	4–2	9–10	4–3	13–7
Seattle	2–5	5–1	4–3	4–2	4–2	10–9	5–2	12–7	2–5	3–3	10–9	—	4–3	9–10	4–3	9–11
Tampa Bay	7–12	10–9	2–5	2–4	4–3	5–2	2–4	2–5	4–2	11–8	2–4	3–4	—	5–2	8–11	10–10
Texas	1–6	2–4	4–2	1–6	3–4	8–11	1–5	5–14	5–2	3–4	10–9	10–9	2–5	—	2–4	10–10
Toronto	8–11	12–7	2–5	4–2	5–1	3–4	3–4	2–5	2–4	8–11	3–4	3–4	11–8	4–2	—	13–7

=== Season summary ===
The Mariners spent most of the season in third place in the American League West, trailing the playoff-bound Houston Astros and Oakland Athletics. They held a Wild Card position in early September, before losing 12 out of 17 games. They won their final four games but finished just outside of the playoffs.

Ace Félix Hernández was named the American League (AL) Player of the Week for June 2–8 and Pitcher of the Month for June. He struck out a career-high 15 batters on June 8.

Kyle Seager won two Player of the Week awards as well as a Gold Glove Award at third base.

Hernández and second baseman Robinson Canó started the All-Star Game, with Seager and closer Fernando Rodney also playing.

Hernández led the AL in earned run average (ERA) and walks plus hits per inning pitched, and Rodney led the majors with 49 saves, a franchise record at the time. Mariners relievers had a 2.59 ERA, lowest in the majors.

General manager Jack Zduriencik received a contract extension in August, though he and manager Lloyd McClendon would both be fired after the team underperformed in 2015.

=== Game log ===
Legend
	Mariners win
	Mariners loss
	Postponement
**Bold**	Mariners team member

2014 Game Log: 87–75 (Home: 41–40; Road: 46–35)
March/April: 11–14 (Home: 5–6; Road: 6–8)

#	Date	Opponent	Score	Win	Loss	Save	Attendance	Record	Boxscore
1	March 31	@ Angels	10–3	**Hernández** (1–0)	Weaver (0–1)	—	44,152	1–0	
2	April 1	@ Angels	8–3	**Ramírez** (1–0)	Wilson (0–1)	—	43,567	2–0	
3	April 2	@ Angels	8–2	**Paxton** (1–0)	Santiago (0–1)	—	38,007	3–0	
4	April 3	@ Athletics	2–3 (12)	Pomeranz (1–0)	**Noesí** (0–1)	—	11,236	3–1	
–	April 4	@ Athletics	PPD, FIELD CONDITIONS; Rescheduled for May 7						
5	April 5	@ Athletics	3–1	**Hernández** (2–0)	Straily (0–1)	**Rodney** (1)	30,290	4–1	
6	April 6	@ Athletics	3–6	Gray (1–0)	**Ramirez** (1–1)	Johnson (1)	32,852	4–2	
7	April 8	Angels	5–3	**Paxton** (2–0)	Santiago (0–2)	**Rodney** (2)	45,661	5–2	
8	April 9	Angels	0–2	Richards (2–0)	**Elias** (0–1)	Frieri (1)	16,437	5–3	
9	April 11	Athletics	6–4	**Hernández** (3–0)	Milone (0–1)	**Rodney** (3)	38,968	6–3	
10	April 12	Athletics	1–3	Gray (2–0)	**Ramirez** (1–2)	Gregerson (1)	22,061	6–4	
11	April 13	Athletics	0–3	Otero (2–0)	**Furbush** (0–1)	Doolittle (1)	22,628	6–5	
12	April 14	@ Rangers	7–1	**Elias** (1–1)	Lewis (0–1)	—	23,081	7–5	
13	April 15	@ Rangers	0–5	Ross (1–0)	**Beavan** (0–1)	—	26,628	7–6	
14	April 16	@ Rangers	2–3	Figueroa (1–1)	**Rodney** (0–1)	—	27,396	7–7	
15	April 17	@ Rangers	6–8	Figueroa (2–1)	**Beimel** (0–1)	Soria (2)	29,024	7–8	
16	April 18	@ Marlins	4–8	Cishek (1–0)	**Medina** (0–1)	—	21,388	7–9	
17	April 19	@ Marlins	0–7	Álvarez (1–2)	**Elias** (1–2)	—	24,003	7–10	
18	April 20	@ Marlins	2–3	Dunn (1–2)	**Wilhelmsen** (0–1)	Cishek (3)	20,228	7–11	
19	April 21	Astros	2–7	Keuchel (2–1)	**Hernández** (3–1)	—	14,630	7–12	
20	April 22	Astros	2–5	McHugh (1–0)	**Ramirez** (1–3)	Fields (2)	10,466	7–13	
21	April 23	Astros	5–3	**Rodney** (1–1)	Fields (0–1)	—	13,739	8–13	
22	April 25	Rangers	6–5	**Medina** (1–1)	Cotts (1–2)	**Rodney** (4)	31,145	9–13	
23	April 26	Rangers	3–6	Poreda (1–0)	**Furbush** (0–2)	Soria (6)	30,038	9–14	
24	April 27	Rangers	6–5	**Farquhar** (1–0)	Ogando (1–2)	**Rodney** (5)	26,300	10–14	
25	April 29	@ Yankees	6–3	**Young** (1–0)	Sabathia (3–3)	—	37,484	11–14	
–	April 30	@ Yankees	PPD, RAIN; Rescheduled for June 2						

May: 16–14 (Home: 8–9; Road: 8–5)

#	Date	Opponent	Score	Win	Loss	Save	Attendance	Record	Boxscore
26	May 1	@ Yankees	4–2	**Elias** (2–2)	Kuroda (2–3)	**Rodney** (6)	43,121	12–14	
27	May 2	@ Astros	4–5 (11)	Bass (1–0)	**Furbush** (0–3)	—	15,771	12–15	
28	May 3	@ Astros	9–8	**Iwakuma** (1–0)	Keuchel (2–2)	**Rodney** (7)	15,798	13–15	
29	May 4	@ Astros	8–7	**Maurer** (1–0)	McHugh (2–1)	**Farquhar** (1)	24,996	14–15	
30	May 5	@ Athletics	4–2	**Young** (2–0)	Kazmir (4–1)	**Rodney** (8)	11,019	15–15	
31	May 6	@ Athletics	8–3	**Elias** (3–2)	Chavez (2–1)	—	12,106	16–15	
32	May 7	@ Athletics	6–4 (10)	**Medina** (2–1)	Cook (0–1)	**Rodney** (9)	17,337	17–15	
33	May 7	@ Athletics	0–2	Pomeranz (2–1)	**Ramirez** (1–4)	Johnson (2)	17,337	17–16	
34	May 8	Royals	1–0	**Iwakuma** (2–0)	Duffy (1–3)	**Rodney** (10)	12,577	18–16	
35	May 9	Royals	1–6	Vargas (3–1)	**Maurer** (1–1)	—	20,858	18–17	
36	May 10	Royals	3–1	**Young** (3–0)	Ventura (2–2)	**Rodney** (11)	29,359	19–17	
37	May 11	Royals	7–9	Coleman (1–0)	**Farquhar** (1–1)	Holland (9)	30,447	19–18	
38	May 12	Rays	12–5	**Hernández** (4–1)	Ramos (1–2)	—	12,392	20–18	
39	May 13	Rays	1–2	Price (4–3)	**Rodney** (1–2)	—	13,446	20–19	
40	May 14	Rays	0–2	Odorizzi (2–3)	**Maurer** (1–2)	Balfour (7)	20,951	20–20	
41	May 16	@ Twins	4–5	Gibson (4–3)	**Young** (3–1)	Perkins (11)	27,275	20–21	
42	May 17	@ Twins	3–4	Deduno (1–2)	**Elias** (3–3)	Perkins (12)	29,717	20–22	
43	May 18	@ Twins	6–2	**Hernández** (5–1)	Nolasco (2–4)	—	32,511	21–22	
44	May 20	@ Rangers	6–2	**Iwakuma** (3–0)	Lewis (3–3)	—	43,706	22–22	
45	May 21	@ Rangers	3–4	Tepesch (1–0)	**Young** (3–2)	Soria (8)	43,654	22–23	
46	May 22	Astros	3–1	**Leone** (1–0)	Cosart (3–4)	**Rodney** (12)	13,836	23–23	
47	May 23	Astros	6–1	**Hernández** (6–1)	Owens (0–1)	—	21,192	24–23	
48	May 24	Astros	4–9	Oberholtzer (1–6)	**Maurer** (1–3)	—	21,585	24–24	
49	May 25	Astros	1–4	Keuchel (6–2)	**Iwakuma** (3–1)	—	26,839	24–25	
50	May 26	Angels	5–1	**Young** (4–2)	Skaggs (4–2)	—	22,710	25–25	
51	May 27	Angels	4–6	Weaver (6–3)	**Elias** (3–4)	Frieri (7)	13,064	25–26	
52	May 28	Angels	3–1	**Hernández** (7–1)	Wilson (6–4)	**Rodney** (13)	13,895	26–26	
53	May 29	Angels	5–7	Shoemaker (3–1)	**Maurer** (1–4)	Frieri (8)	11,657	26–27	
54	May 30	Tigers	3–6	Verlander (6–4)	**Iwakuma** (3–2)	Chamberlain (2)	29,000	26–28	
55	May 31	Tigers	3–2	**Young** (5–2)	Smyly (2–4)	**Rodney** (14)	37,142	27–28	

June: 18–10 (Home: 8–7; Road: 10–3)

#	Date	Opponent	Score	Win	Loss	Save	Attendance	Record	Boxscore
56	June 1	Tigers	4–0	**Elias** (4–4)	Scherzer (6–2)	—	31,407	28–28	
57	June 2	@ Yankees	10–2	**Hernández** (8–1)	Phelps (1–3)	—	41,539	29–28	
58	June 3	@ Braves	7–5	**Leone** (2–0)	Wood (5–6)	**Rodney** (15)	36,503	30–28	
59	June 4	@ Braves	2–0	**Iwakuma** (4–2)	Minor (2–4)	**Rodney** (16)	26,960	31–28	
60	June 6	@ Rays	0–4	Bédard (3–4)	**Young** (5–3)	—	14,577	31–29	
61	June 7	@ Rays	7–4	**Elias** (5–4)	Cobb (1–4)	**Rodney** (17)	23,996	32–29	
62	June 8	@ Rays	5–0	**Medina** (3–1)	Balfour (0–2)	—	18,158	33–29	
63	June 9	@ Rays	3–0	**Beimel** (1–1)	Price (4–6)	**Rodney** (18)	10,400	34–29	
64	June 10	Yankees	2–3	Betances (4–0)	**Iwakuma** (4–3)	Robertson (15)	28,405	34–30	
65	June 11	Yankees	2–4	Tanaka (10–1)	**Young** (5–4)	—	28,434	34–31	
66	June 12	Yankees	3–6	Whitley (2–0)	**Elias** (5–5)	Robertson (16)	40,596	34–32	
67	June 13	Rangers	0–1	Tolleson (2–1)	**Hernández** (8–2)	Soria (14)	22,039	34–33	
68	June 14	Rangers	3–4	Cotts (2–3)	**Rodney** (1–3)	Soria (15)	27,700	34–34	
69	June 15	Rangers	5–1	**Iwakuma** (5–3)	Martinez (1–4)	—	39,196	35–34	
70	June 16	Padres	5–1	**Young** (6–4)	Ross (6–6)	—	17,512	36–34	
71	June 17	Padres	6–1	**Elias** (6–5)	Stults (2–9)	—	19,896	37–34	
72	June 18	@ Padres	1–2	Benoit (3–0)	**Furbush** (0–4)	Street (19)	27,523	37–35	
73	June 19	@ Padres	1–4	Hahn (2–1)	**Leone** (2–1)	Street (20)	18,755	37–36	
74	June 20	@ Royals	7–5	**Furbush** (1–4)	Holland (0–2)	**Rodney** (19)	38,475	38–36	
75	June 21	@ Royals	2–1	**Medina** (4–1)	Vargas (7–3)	**Rodney** (20)	21,640	39–36	
76	June 22	@ Royals	2–1	**Elias** (7–5)	Ventura (5–6)	**Rodney** (21)	23,278	40–36	
77	June 23	Red Sox	12–3	**Hernández** (9–2)	Lackey (8–5)	—	26,860	41–36	
78	June 24	Red Sox	8–2	**Beimel** (2–1)	Peavy (1–6)	—	20,015	42–36	
79	June 25	Red Sox	4–5	Buchholz (3–4)	**Iwakuma** (5–4)	Uehara (16)	27,333	42–37	
80	June 27	Indians	3–2	**Young** (7–4)	Bauer (2–4)	**Rodney** (22)	28,084	43–37	
81	June 28	Indians	0–5	Tomlin (5–5)	**Elias** (7–6)	—	23,012	43–38	
82	June 29	Indians	3–0	**Hernández** (10–2)	House (0–2)	**Rodney** (23)	26,171	44–38	
83	June 30	@ Astros	10–4	**Walker** (1–0)	McHugh (4–7)	**Wilhelmsen** (1)	17,340	45–38	

July: 11–14 (Home: 4–8; Road: 6–5)

#	Date	Opponent	Score	Win	Loss	Save	Attendance	Record	Boxscore
84	July 1	@ Astros	13–2	**Iwakuma** (6–4)	Cosart (8–6)	—	17,504	46–38	
85	July 2	@ Astros	5–2	**Young** (8–4)	Peacock (2–5)	**Rodney** (24)	17,209	47–38	
86	July 4	@ White Sox	1–7	Sale (8–1)	**Elias** (7–7)	—	30,297	47–39	
87	July 5	@ White Sox	3–2 (14)	**Wilhelmsen** (1–1)	Belisario (3–5)	**Rodney** (25)	23,113	48–39	
88	July 6	@ White Sox	0–1	Noesí (3–6)	**Walker** (1–1)	Petricka (3)	23,370	48–40	
89	July 7	Twins	2–0	**Iwakuma** (7–4)	Correia (4–11)	**Rodney** (26)	18,562	49–40	
90	July 8	Twins	0–2	Hughes (9–5)	**Young** (8–5)	Perkins (21)	15,553	49–41	
91	July 9	Twins	1–8	Gibson (8–7)	**Elias** (7–8)	—	16,460	49–42	
92	July 10	Twins	2–4	Pino (1–2)	**Wilhelmsen** (1–2)	Perkins (22)	14,530	49–43	
93	July 11	Athletics	3–2	**Hernández** (11–2)	Samardzija (3–8)	**Rodney** (27)	32,971	50–43	
94	July 12	Athletics	6–2	**Iwakuma** (8–4)	Chavez (7–6)	—	39,204	51–43	
95	July 13	Athletics	1–4	Gray (10–3)	**Young** (8–6)	Doolittle (14)	25,944	51–44	
96	July 18	@ Angels	2–3 (16)	Santiago (2–7)	**Leone** (2–2)	—	42,517	51–45	
97	July 19	@ Angels	3–2 (12)	**Leone** (3–2)	Thatcher (1–1)	**Furbush** (1)	40,231	52–45	
98	July 20	@ Angels	5–6	Thatcher (2–1)	**Rodney** (1–4)	—	37,128	52–46	
99	July 21	Mets	5–2	**Elias** (8–8)	Niese (5–5)	—	21,943	53–46	
100	July 22	Mets	1–3	deGrom (4–5)	**Ramirez** (1–5)	Mejía (12)	18,681	53–47	
101	July 23	Mets	2–3	Colón (9–8)	**Walker** (1–2)	Mejía (13)	36,224	53–48	
102	July 24	Orioles	0–4	Chen (11–3)	**Iwakuma** (8–5)	—	19,621	53–49	
103	July 25	Orioles	1–2 (10)	O'Day (3–1)	**Furbush** (1–5)	Britton (19)	34,792	53–50	
104	July 26	Orioles	4–3	**Young** (9–6)	Norris (8–7)	**Rodney** (28)	36,936	54–50	
105	July 27	Orioles	2–3 (10)	McFarland (4–2)	**Medina** (4–2)	Britton (20)	26,523	54–51	
106	July 29	@ Indians	5–2	**Iwakuma** (9–5)	Bauer (4–6)	**Rodney** (29)	15,713	55–51	
107	July 30	@ Indians	0–2	Kluber (11–6)	**Hernández** (11–3)	—	14,863	55–52	
108	July 31	@ Indians	6–5	**Beimel** (3–1)	Shaw (4–3)	**Rodney** (30)	16,336	56–52	

August: 17–10 (Home: 10–5; Road: 7–5)

#	Date	Opponent	Score	Win	Loss	Save	Attendance	Record	Boxscore
109	August 1	@ Orioles	1–2	Chen (12–3)	**Elias** (8–9)	Britton (22)	39,487	56–53	
110	August 2	@ Orioles	6–3	**Leone** (4–2)	González (5–6)	—	36,508	57–53	
111	August 3	@ Orioles	0–1	Tillman (8–5)	**Iwakuma** (9–6)	Britton (23)	35,217	57–54	
112	August 5	Braves	4–2	**Hernández** (12–3)	Wood (7–9)	**Rodney** (31)	24,496	58–54	
113	August 6	Braves	7–3	**Young** (10–6)	Teherán (10–8)	—	30,770	59–54	
114	August 7	White Sox	13–3	**Elias** (9–9)	Carroll (4–7)	—	18,740	60–54	
115	August 8	White Sox	4–1	**Iwakuma** (10–6)	Quintana (6–8)	**Rodney** (32)	23,223	61–54	
116	August 9	White Sox	1–2 (10)	Surkamp (1–0)	**Rodney** (1–5)	Petricka (8)	40,122	61–55	
117	August 10	White Sox	4–2	**Leone** (5–2)	Danks (9–8)	**Rodney** (33)	27,236	62–55	
118	August 11	Blue Jays	11–1	**Hernández** (13–3)	Hutchison (8–10)	—	41,168	63–55	
119	August 12	Blue Jays	6–3	**Young** (11–6)	Happ (8–7)	**Rodney** (34)	26,076	64–55	
120	August 13	Blue Jays	2–0	**Iwakuma** (11–6)	Dickey (9–12)	**Rodney** (35)	32,368	65–55	
121	August 15	@ Tigers	7–2	**Paxton** (3–0)	Porcello (13–8)	—	42,385	66–55	
122	August 16	@ Tigers	2–4	Price (12–8)	**Hernández** (13–4)	Nathan (25)	43,833	66–56	
123	August 17	@ Tigers	8–1	**Young** (12–6)	Ray (1–3)	—	41,181	67–56	
124	August 18	@ Phillies	1–4	Williams (3–5)	**Elias** (9–10)	Papelbon (29)	28,102	67–57	
125	August 19	@ Phillies	5–2	**Iwakuma** (12–6)	Burnett (6–14)	**Rodney** (36)	31,592	68–57	
126	August 20	@ Phillies	3–4	Hamels (7–6)	**Paxton** (3–1)	Papelbon (30)	25,157	68–58	
127	August 22	@ Red Sox	5–3	**Leone** (6–2)	Uehara (5–4)	**Rodney** (37)	36,433	69–58	
128	August 23	@ Red Sox	7–3	**Wilhelmsen** (2–2)	Workman (1–8)	—	36,905	70–58	
129	August 24	@ Red Sox	8–6	**Leone** (7–2)	Webster (3–2)	**Rodney** (38)	37,022	71–58	
130	August 25	Rangers	0–2	Mikolas (2–5)	**Elias** (9–11)	Feliz (7)	21,620	71–59	
131	August 26	Rangers	5–0	**Paxton** (4–1)	Martinez (3–10)	—	20,469	72–59	
132	August 27	Rangers	4–12	Lewis (9–11)	**Ramirez** (1–6)	—	29,463	72–60	
133	August 29	Nationals	3–8	Zimmermann (10–5)	**Hernández** (13–5)	—	35,616	72–61	
134	August 30	Nationals	1–3	Strasburg (11–10)	**Elias** (9–12)	Soriano (30)	32,894	72–62	
135	August 31	Nationals	5–3	**Iwakuma** (13–6)	Roark (12–9)	**Rodney** (39)	26,221	73–62	

September: 14–13 (Home: 5–4; Road: 9–9)

#	Date	Opponent	Score	Win	Loss	Save	Attendance	Record	Boxscore
136	September 1	@ Athletics	1–6	Hammel (10–10)	**Young** (12–7)	—	36,067	73–63	
137	September 2	@ Athletics	6–5	**Paxton** (5–1)	Gray (13–8)	**Rodney** (40)	23,859	74–63	
138	September 3	@ Athletics	2–1	**Hernández** (14–5)	Lester (13–10)	**Rodney** (41)	17,073	75–63	
139	September 4	@ Rangers	10–2	**Elias** (10–12)	Ross (2–6)	—	26,965	76–63	
140	September 5	@ Rangers	7–5	**Iwakuma** (14–6)	Baker (3–4)	**Rodney** (42)	23,428	77–63	
141	September 6	@ Rangers	4–2	**Farquhar** (2–1)	Cotts (2–9)	**Rodney** (43)	29,552	78–63	
142	September 7	@ Rangers	0–1	Holland (1–0)	**Paxton** (5–2)	Feliz (8)	26,851	78–64	
143	September 8	Astros	4–1	**Farquhar** (3–1)	Foltynewicz (0–1)	**Rodney** (44)	15,617	79–64	
144	September 9	Astros	1–2	McHugh (9–9)	**Medina** (4–3)	Fields (4)	11,345	79–65	
145	September 10	Astros	2–5	Tropeano (1–0)	**Iwakuma** (14–7)	Sipp (4)	16,931	79–66	
146	September 12	Athletics	4–2	**Paxton** (6–2)	Hammel (10–11)	**Rodney** (45)	29,090	80–66	
147	September 13	Athletics	2–3 (10)	Gregerson (5–4)	**Rodney** (1–6)	Doolittle (21)	43,913	80–67	
148	September 14	Athletics	0–4	Lester (15–10)	**Young** (12–8)	—	28,925	80–68	
149	September 15	@ Angels	1–8	Shoemaker (16–4)	**Iwakuma** (14–8)	—	36,137	80–69	
150	September 16	@ Angels	13–2	**Smith** (1–0)	Grilli (1–5)	—	36,193	81–69	
151	September 17	@ Angels	0–5	Wilson (13–9)	**Paxton** (6–3)	—	36,875	81–70	
152	September 18	@ Angels	3–1	**Wilhelmsen** (3–2)	Jepsen (0–2)	**Rodney** (46)	40,835	82–70	
153	September 19	@ Astros	10–5	**Walker** (2–2)	Peacock (4–9)	—	27,568	83–70	
154	September 20	@ Astros	1–10	Keuchel (12–9)	**Young** (12–9)	—	36,525	83–71	
155	September 21	@ Astros	3–8	McHugh (11–9)	**Iwakuma** (14–9)	—	31,466	83–72	
156	September 22	@ Blue Jays	4–14	Happ (10–11)	**Paxton** (6–4)	—	15,548	83–73	
157	September 23	@ Blue Jays	2–10	Dickey (14–12)	**Hernández** (14–6)	—	16,272	83–74	
158	September 24	@ Blue Jays	0–1	Buehrle (13–10)	**Walker** (2–3)	Sanchez (3)	16,836	83–75	
159	September 25	@ Blue Jays	7–5	**Medina** (5–3)	Loup (4–4)	**Rodney** (47)	17,173	84–75	
160	September 26	Angels	4–3	**Iwakuma** (15–9)	Weaver (18–9)	**Rodney** (48)	26,865	85–75	
161	September 27	Angels	2–1 (11)	**Leone** (8–2)	Morin (4–4)	—	32,716	86–75	
162	September 28	Angels	4–1	**Hernández** (15–6)	Rasmus (3–2)	—	40,823	87–75	

== 2014 roster ==
2014 Seattle Mariners
Roster
Pitchers: 49 Blake Beavan; 97 Joe Beimel; 29 Roenis Elías; 40 Danny Farquhar; 41 Charlie Furbush; 34 Félix Hernández; 18 Hisashi Iwakuma; 52 Dominic Leone; 44 Lucas Luetge; 37 Brandon Maurer; 31 Yoervis Medina; 45 Héctor Noesí; 65 James Paxton; 46 Stephen Pryor; 50 Erasmo Ramírez; 56 Fernando Rodney; 39 Carson Smith; 32 Taijuan Walker; 54 Tom Wilhelmsen; 53 Chris Young	Catchers: 4 John Buck; 35 Humberto Quintero; 2 Jesús Sucre; 3 Mike Zunino; Infielders: 8 Willie Bloomquist; 22 Robinson Canó; 6 Nick Franklin; 5 Brad Miller; 63 Jesús Montero; 21 Kendrys Morales; 20 Logan Morrison; 15 Kyle Seager; 17 Justin Smoak; 1 Chris Taylor	Outfielders: 13 Dustin Ackley; 36 Abraham Almonte; 9 Endy Chávez; 28 Chris Denorfia; 16 Cole Gillespie; 27 Corey Hart; 16 Austin Jackson; 99 James Jones; 7 Stefen Romero; 55 Michael Saunders	Manager: 23 Lloyd McClendon; Coaches: 26 Rich Donnelly (third base); 33 Trent Jewett (bench); 10 Howard Johnson (hitting); 62 Jason Phillips (bullpen catcher); 88 Chris Prieto (quality control); 48 Mike Rojas (bullpen); 43 Andy Van Slyke (first base); 47 Rick Waits (pitching); 25 Chris Woodward (infield)

=== Players stats ===
==== Batting ====
Note: G = Games played; AB = At bats; R = Runs scored; H = Hits; 2B = Doubles; 3B = Triples; HR = Home runs; RBI = Runs batted in; BB = Base on balls; SO = Strikeouts; SB = Stolen bases; CS = Caught stealing; AVG = Batting average

Rank	Player	G	AB	R	H	2B	3B	HR	RBI	BB	SO	SB	CS	AVG
1	Robinson Canó	157	595	77	187	37	2	14	82	61	68	10	3	.314
2	Chris Taylor	47	136	16	39	8	0	0	9	11	39	5	2	.287
3	Willie Bloomquist	47	136	15	37	6	0	1	14	4	32	1	1	.278
4	Endy Chávez	80	232	22	64	12	2	2	23	15	30	5	2	.276
5	Michael Saunders	78	231	38	63	11	3	8	34	26	59	4	5	.273
6	Kyle Seager	159	590	71	158	27	4	25	96	52	118	7	5	.268
7	Logan Morrison	99	336	41	88	20	0	11	38	24	59	5	2	.262
8	Cole Gillespie	34	71	9	18	2	0	1	5	6	13	2	2	.254
9	James Jones	108	312	46	78	9	5	0	9	12	67	27	1	.250
10	Dustin Ackley	143	502	64	123	27	4	14	65	32	90	8	4	.245
11	Jesús Montero	6	17	1	4	0	0	1	2	0	3	0	0	.235
12	Austin Jackson	54	223	19	51	5	1	0	14	12	59	11	2	.229
13	John Buck	27	84	9	19	2	0	1	6	8	24	0	0	.226
14	Brad Miller	123	367	47	81	15	4	10	36	34	95	4	2	.221
15	Jesus Sucre	21	61	4	13	2	0	0	5	0	17	0	0	.213
16	Kendrys Morales	59	213	16	44	9	0	7	24	21	41	0	0	.207
17	Corey Hart	68	232	17	47	9	0	6	21	16	59	2	0	.203
18	Justin Smoak	80	248	28	50	13	0	7	30	24	66	0	1	.202
19	Mike Zunino	131	438	51	87	20	2	22	60	17	158	0	3	.199
20	Abraham Almonte	27	106	10	21	5	1	1	8	6	40	3	1	.198
21	Chris Denorfia	32	82	11	16	2	1	2	5	7	19	1	2	.195
22	Stefen Romero	72	177	19	34	6	2	3	11	4	48	0	4	.192
23	Nick Franklin	17	47	3	6	0	1	0	2	3	21	1	0	.128
24	Roenis Elias	2	4	0	0	0	0	0	0	0	1	0	0	.000
24	Félix Hernández	1	2	0	0	0	0	0	0	0	0	0	0	.000
24	Hisashi Iwakuma	2	4	0	0	0	0	0	0	1	3	0	0	.000
24	Brandon Maurer	2	1	0	0	0	0	0	0	0	0	0	0	.000
24	James Paxton	1	1	0	0	0	0	0	0	0	1	0	0	.000
24	Humberto Quintero	3	2	0	0	0	0	0	1	0	1	0	0	.000
24	Erasmo Ramirez	2	2	0	0	0	0	0	0	0	1	0	0	.000
24	Chris Young	1	1	0	0	0	0	0	0	0	0	0	0	.000
—	Team Total	162	5450	634	1328	247	32	136	600	396	1232	96	42	0.244

==== Pitching ====
Note: W = Wins; L = Losses; ERA = Earned run average; G = Games pitched; GS = Games started; SV = Saves; SVO = Save Opportunities; IP = Innings pitched; H = Hits allowed; ER = Earned runs allowed; HR = Home runs allowed; BB = Walks allowed; SO = Strikeouts

Rank	Player	W	L	ERA	G	GS	SV	SVO	IP	H	ER	HR	BB	SO
1	Stephen Pryor	0	0	0.00	1	0	0	0	1.2	1	0	0	2	1
1	Carson Smith	1	0	0.00	9	0	0	0	8.1	2	0	0	3	10
3	Félix Hernández	15	6	2.14	34	34	0	0	236.0	170	56	16	46	248
4	Dominic Leone	8	2	2.17	57	0	0	2	66.1	52	16	4	25	70
5	Joe Beimel	3	1	2.20	56	0	0	0	45.0	39	11	4	14	25
6	Tom Wilhelmsen	3	2	2.27	57	2	1	3	79.1	47	20	6	36	72
7	Taijuan Walker	2	3	2.61	8	5	0	0	38.0	31	11	2	18	34
8	Danny Farquhar	3	1	2.66	66	0	1	3	71.0	58	21	5	22	81
9	Yoervis Medina	5	3	2.68	66	0	0	2	57.0	48	17	3	28	60
10	Fernando Rodney	1	6	2.85	69	0	48	51	66.1	61	21	3	28	76
11	James Paxton	6	4	3.04	13	13	0	0	74.0	60	25	3	29	59
12	Hisashi Iwakuma	15	9	3.52	28	28	0	0	179.0	167	70	20	21	154
13	Charlie Furbush	1	5	3.61	67	0	1	1	42.1	40	17	4	9	51
14	Chris Young	12	9	3.65	30	29	0	0	165.0	143	67	26	60	108
15	Roenis Elias	10	12	3.85	29	29	0	0	163.2	151	70	16	64	143
16	Blake Beavan	0	1	4.50	1	1	0	0	4.0	6	2	2	0	1
17	Brandon Maurer	1	4	4.65	38	7	0	1	69.2	74	36	6	19	55
18	Lucas Luetge	0	0	5.00	12	0	0	0	9.0	6	5	3	5	7
19	Erasmo Ramírez	1	6	5.26	17	14	0	0	75.1	82	44	13	34	60
20	Héctor Noesí	0	1	27.00	2	0	0	0	1.0	2	3	1	0	2
—	Team total	87	75	3.17	162	162	51	63	1452.0	1240	512	137	463	1317

Source: Baseball Reference

=== Fielding ===
Note: G = Games played; INN = Innings played; TC = Total chances; A = Total assists; E = Total errors committed; SB = Stolen bases allowed; CS = Caught stealing; PB = Passed balls; FPCT = Average of errors per total chances

Rank	Player	G	INN	TC	A	E	SB	CS	PB	FPCT
1	Blake Beavan	1	4.0	1	1	0	0	0	0	1.000
1	Willie Bloomquist	43	292.1	128	51	0	0	0	0	1.000
1	Endy Chávez	76	452.1	80	1	0	0	0	0	1.000
1	Roenis Elias	29	163.2	24	22	0	0	0	0	1.000
1	Danny Farquhar	66	71.0	17	11	0	0	0	0	1.000
1	Nick Franklin	17	101.0	47	33	0	0	0	0	1.000
1	Charlie Furbush	67	42.1	3	3	0	0	0	0	1.000
1	Dominic Leone	57	66.1	8	5	0	0	0	0	1.000
1	Lucas Luetge	12	9.0	1	1	0	0	0	0	1.000
1	Brandon Maurer	38	69.2	7	5	0	0	0	0	1.000
1	Jesús Montero	5	6.0	8	0	0	0	0	0	1.000
1	Humberto Quintero	3	7.0	10	8	0	0	0	0	1.000
1	Erasmo Ramírez	11	53.0	7	5	0	0	0	0	1.000
1	Michael Saunders	84	556.2	128	1	0	0	0	0	1.000
1	Carson Smith	9	8.1	1	1	0	0	0	0	1.000
1	Taijuan Walker	8	38.0	10	7	0	0	0	0	1.000
17	Justin Smoak	79	608.0	621	31	2	0	0	0	0.997
18	Logan Morrison	97	732.0	707	47	3	0	0	0	0.996
19	Mike Zunino	131	1121.0	1099	84	5	71	28	8	0.995
20	Jesus Sucre	21	160.0	162	10	1	10	4	2	0.994
21	John Buck	25	167.0	147	11	1	11	3	1	0.993
22	Dustin Ackley	141	1130.0	251	4	2	0	0	0	0.992
22	Kendrys Morales	59	109.2	122	4	1	0	0	0	0.992
24	James Jones	103	698.1	161	1	2	0	0	0	0.988
25	Robinson Canó	158	1304.0	697	427	9	0	0	0	0.987
26	Stefen Romero	67	318.1	69	1	1	0	0	0	0.986
27	Austin Jackson	54	457.0	135	2	2	0	0	0	0.985
28	Kyle Seager	158	1402.0	422	327	8	0	0	0	0.981
29	Chris Denorfia	30	184.1	43	1	1	0	0	0	0.977
30	Hisashi Iwakuma	28	179.0	42	24	1	0	0	0	0.976
31	Félix Hernández	34	236.0	37	25	1	0	0	0	0.973
32	Corey Hart	63	71.0	29	0	1	0	0	0	0.966
33	Chris Taylor	47	365.0	184	127	7	0	0	0	0.962
34	Brad Miller	123	974.1	451	282	19	0	0	0	0.958
35	Cole Gillespie	29	175.0	47	0	2	0	0	0	0.957
36	Chris Young	30	165.0	18	10	1	0	0	0	0.944
37	Tom Wilhelmsen	57	79.1	17	8	1	0	0	0	0.941
38	Joe Beimel	56	45.0	14	11	1	0	0	0	0.929
39	Abraham Almonte	27	223.2	65	2	5	0	0	0	0.923
40	Fernando Rodney	69	66.1	10	6	1	0	0	0	0.900
41	Yoervis Medina	66	57.0	8	6	1	0	0	0	0.875
42	James Paxton	13	74.0	11	7	3	0	0	0	0.727
43	Héctor Noesí	2	1.0	0	0	0	0	0	0	—
43	Stephen Pryor	1	1.2	0	0	0	0	0	0	—
—	Team total	162	13068.0	6046	1608	82	92	35	11	0.986

== Farm system ==
Level	Team	League	Manager
AAA	Tacoma Rainiers	Pacific Coast League	Roy Howell
AA	Jackson Generals	Southern League	Jim Horner
A	High Desert Mavericks	California League	Eddie Menchaca
A	Clinton LumberKings	Midwest League	Scott Steinmann
A-Short Season	Everett AquaSox	Northwest League	Dave Valle
Rookie	Pulaski Mariners	Appalachian League	Rob Mummau
Rookie	AZL Mariners	Arizona League	Darrin Garner
