= 2014 Toronto Blue Jays season =

2014 Toronto Blue Jays
- League: American League
- Division: East
- Ballpark: Rogers Centre
- City: Toronto, Ontario
- Record: 83–79 (.512)
- Divisional place: 3rd
- Owners: Rogers; Paul Beeston (CEO)
- General managers: Alex Anthopoulos
- Managers: John Gibbons
- Television: Sportsnet; Sportsnet One (Buck Martinez, Pat Tabler, Joe Siddall)
- Radio: Blue Jays Radio Network; Sportsnet 590 the FAN (Jerry Howarth, Joe Siddall, Mike Wilner, Duane Ward)

The 2014 Toronto Blue Jays season was the 38th season for the franchise, and the 25th full season of play (26th overall) at Rogers Centre. Pitcher Roy Halladay signed a one-day contract with the Blue Jays before retiring from baseball, citing injuries.

The Blue Jays announced their 2014 schedule on September 10, 2013.

== Standings ==
=== American League East ===
AL East
Team	W	L	Pct.	GB	Home	Road
Baltimore Orioles	96	66	.593	—	50‍–‍31	46‍–‍35
New York Yankees	84	78	.519	12	43‍–‍38	41‍–‍40
Toronto Blue Jays	83	79	.512	13	46‍–‍35	37‍–‍44
Tampa Bay Rays	77	85	.475	19	36‍–‍45	41‍–‍40
Boston Red Sox	71	91	.438	25	34‍–‍47	37‍–‍44

=== American League Wild Card ===
Division leaders
Team	W	L	Pct.
Los Angeles Angels of Anaheim	98	64	.605
Baltimore Orioles	96	66	.593
Detroit Tigers	90	72	.556

Wild Card teams (Top 2 teams qualify for postseason)
Team	W	L	Pct.	GB
Kansas City Royals	89	73	.549	+1
Oakland Athletics	88	74	.543	—
Seattle Mariners	87	75	.537	1
Cleveland Indians	85	77	.525	3
New York Yankees	84	78	.519	4
Toronto Blue Jays	83	79	.512	5
Tampa Bay Rays	77	85	.475	11
Chicago White Sox	73	89	.451	15
Boston Red Sox	71	91	.438	17
Houston Astros	70	92	.432	18
Minnesota Twins	70	92	.432	18
Texas Rangers	67	95	.414	21

== Records vs opponents ==
	Record			Games Left		
Opponent	Home	Road	Total	Home	Road	Total
AL East
Baltimore Orioles	4–5	4–6	8–11	–	–	–
Boston Red Sox	5–5	7–2	12–7	–	–	–
New York Yankees	5–4	3–7	8–11	–	–	–
Tampa Bay Rays	5–4	6–4	11–8	–	–	–
Totals	19–18	20–19	39–37	–	–	–
AL Central
Chicago White Sox	1–3	1–2	2–5	–	–	–
Cleveland Indians	2–1	2–1	4–2	–	–	–
Detroit Tigers	2–1	3–0	5–1	–	–	–
Kansas City Royals	2–2	1–2	3–4	–	–	–
Minnesota Twins	1–2	1–2	2–4	–	–	–
Totals	8–9	8–7	16–16	–	–	–
AL West
Houston Astros	2–1	1–3	3–4	–	–	–
Los Angeles Angels	1–3	1–2	2–5	–	–	–
Oakland Athletics	3–0	0–4	3–4	–	–	–
Seattle Mariners	3–1	0–3	3–4	–	–	–
Texas Rangers	2–1	2–1	4–2	–	–	–
Totals	11–6	4–13	15–19	–	–	–
National League
Chicago Cubs	3–0	–	3–0	–	–	–
Cincinnati Reds	–	1–2	1–2	–	–	–
Milwaukee Brewers	2–0	1–1	3–1	–	–	–
Philadelphia Phillies	2–0	2–0	4–0	–	–	–
Pittsburgh Pirates	–	1–2	1–2	–	–	–
St. Louis Cardinals	1–2	–	1–2	–	–	–
Totals	8–2	5–5	13–7	–	–	–
Grand Totals	46–35	37–44	83–79	–	–	–

Month	Games	Won	Lost	Pct.
March	1	0	1	.000
April	26	12	14	.462
May	30	21	9	.700
June	27	12	15	.444
July	26	15	11	.577
August	26	9	17	.346
September	26	14	12	.538
Totals	162	83	79	.509

2014 American League record Source: MLB Standings Grid – 2014
Team	BAL	BOS	CWS	CLE	DET	HOU	KC	LAA	MIN	NYY	OAK	SEA	TB	TEX	TOR	NL
Baltimore	—	11–8	5–1	3–4	1–5	4–3	3–4	4–2	4–3	13–6	2–4	5–2	12–7	6–1	11–8	12–8
Boston	8–11	—	4–3	2–5	1–5	4–3	6–1	2–5	4–2	7–12	3–4	1–5	9–10	4–2	7–12	9–11
Chicago	1–5	3–4	—	9–10	9–10	3–3	6–13	1–5	9–10	2–5	4–3	3–4	5–2	2–4	5–2	11–9
Cleveland	4–3	5–2	10–9	—	8–11	5–2	10–9	2–5	11–8	4–3	2–4	2–4	4–2	6–1	2–4	10–10
Detroit	5–1	5–1	10–9	11–8	—	4–3	13–6	3–4	9–10	3–4	5–2	2–4	3–4	4–3	1–5	12–8
Houston	3–4	3–4	3–3	2–5	3–4	—	3–3	7–12	3–3	4–2	8–11	9–10	2–5	11–8	4–3	5–15
Kansas City	4–3	1–6	13–6	9–10	6–13	3–3	—	3–3	11–8	4–3	5–2	2–5	4–2	5–1	4–3	15–5
Los Angeles	2–4	5–2	5–1	5–2	4–3	12–7	3–3	—	7–0	2–4	10–9	7–12	5–2	14–5	5–2	12–8
Minnesota	3–4	2–4	10–9	8–11	10–9	3–3	8–11	0–7	—	3–4	1–6	5–2	2–4	2–5	4–2	9–11
New York	6–13	12–7	5–2	3–4	4–3	2–4	3–4	4–2	4–3	—	2–4	3–3	8–11	4–3	11–8	13–7
Oakland	4–2	4–3	3–4	4–2	2–5	11–8	2–5	9–10	6–1	4–2	—	9–10	4–2	9–10	4–3	13–7
Seattle	2–5	5–1	4–3	4–2	4–2	10–9	5–2	12–7	2–5	3–3	10–9	—	4–3	9–10	4–3	9–11
Tampa Bay	7–12	10–9	2–5	2–4	4–3	5–2	2–4	2–5	4–2	11–8	2–4	3–4	—	5–2	8–11	10–10
Texas	1–6	2–4	4–2	1–6	3–4	8–11	1–5	5–14	5–2	3–4	10–9	10–9	2–5	—	2–4	10–10
Toronto	8–11	12–7	2–5	4–2	5–1	3–4	3–4	2–5	2–4	8–11	3–4	3–4	11–8	4–2	—	13–7

== 2014 draft ==
The 2014 Major League Baseball draft was held on June 5–7.

Round	Pick	Player	Position	College/School	Nationality	Signed
1	9	Jeff Hoffman	RHP	East Carolina University (NC)	(United States)	July 2, 2014
1	11*	Max Pentecost	C	Kennesaw State University (GA)	(United States)	July 2, 2014
2	49	Sean Reid-Foley	RHP	Sandalwood High School (FL)	(United States)	June 10, 2014
3	83	Nick Wells	LHP	Battlefield High School (VA)	(United States)	June 18, 2014
4	114	Matt Morgan	C	Thorsby High School (AL)	(United States)	June 8, 2014
5	144	Lane Thomas	RF	Bearden High School (TN)	(United States)	June 10, 2014
6	174	Grayson Huffman	LHP	Grayson County College (TX)	(United States)	June 18, 2014
7	204	Zack Zehner	LF	California Polytechnic State University (CA)	(United States)	Unsigned
8	234	Justin Shafer	RHP	University of Florida (FL)	(United States)	June 8, 2014
9	264	Ryan Metzler	2B	University of South Carolina Aiken (SC)	(United States)	June 12, 2014
10	294	Jordan Romano	RHP	Oral Roberts University (OK)	(Canada)	June 12, 2014

- – Toronto received the 11th overall pick in the 2014 draft as compensation for not signing Phillip Bickford in 2013.

== Regular season ==
=== Summary ===
The Blue Jays started the year, like most years in the past 10, in mediocre fashion, ending the month of April with a record of 12 wins and 15 losses, 3 1/2 games behind the Eastern division leaders. The month of May was a different story; they won 21 games and lost 9, taking over sole possession of the division lead on May 22. The month was memorable for a 9-game winning streak which included series sweeps over the Boston Red Sox (away), the Oakland A's (at home) and the Tampa Bay Rays (at home). Edwin Encarnación hit 16 home runs during the month, tying an American League record for homers in May, set by Mickey Mantle in 1956. Between May 15 and June 6, the Blue Jays won 18 out of 21 to climb into their largest division lead, at any point of the season, since 1993. However, from June 7 to June 30 the Jays won only 7 more games versus 15 losses. As of June 30, they were just 6 games above .500, but still held onto a 1 1/2 game lead in their division.

The Blue Jays had three All Stars in 2014: José Bautista, Mark Buehrle, and Edwin Encarnación.

On July 26, the Blue Jays ended a streak of 17 consecutive losses in games against the Yankees at Yankee Stadium. On August 10, the Blue Jays played the longest game in franchise history in terms of both time and innings, defeating the Detroit Tigers 6–5 after 19 innings. After a poor August, Toronto opened September with its first series win in Tampa Bay since April 6–8, 2007. They would go on to complete the sweep, their first at Tropicana Field. Top prospect Daniel Norris made his MLB debut on September 5, striking out David Ortiz in his 1/3 of an inning.

On September 23, the Blue Jays were officially eliminated from playoff contention. The Kansas City Royals clinched a playoff spot on September 26, making the Blue Jays the owners of the longest active MLB playoff drought, until clinching a playoff berth the following year.

Legend
Blue Jays Win	Blue Jays Loss	Game postponed

2014 Game Log
March: 0–1 (Home: 0–0; Road: 0–1)

#	Date	Opponent	Score	Win	Loss	Save	Attendance	Record	GB
1	March 31	@ Rays	2–9	Price (1–0)	Dickey (0–1)		31,042	0–1	1

April: 12–14 (Home: 5–7; Road: 7–7)

#	Date	Opponent	Score	Win	Loss	Save	Attendance	Record	GB
2	April 1	@ Rays	4–2	Hutchison (1–0)	Cobb (0–1)	Santos (1)	11,113	1–1	½
3	April 2	@ Rays	3–0	Buehrle (1–0)	Moore (0–1)	Cecil (1)	10,808	2–1	+½
4	April 3	@ Rays	2–7	Archer (1–0)	Morrow (0–1)		9,571	2–2	½
5	April 4	Yankees	3–7	Tanaka (1–0)	McGowan (0–1)		48,197	2–3	1
6	April 5	Yankees	4–0	Dickey (1–1)	Pineda (0–1)	Santos (2)	45,446	3–3	1
7	April 6	Yankees	4–6	Sabathia (1–1)	Hutchison (1–1)	Robertson (2)	34,067	3–4	1
8	April 8	Astros	5–2	Buehrle (2–0)	Oberholtzer (0–2)	Santos (3)	13,123	4–4	½
9	April 9	Astros	7–3	Morrow (1–1)	Harrell (0–2)		13,569	5–4	+½
10	April 10	Astros	4–6	Keuchel (1–1)	Dickey (1–2)	Bass (1)	15,778	5–5	–
11	April 11	@ Orioles	2–0	McGowan (1–1)	Tillman (1–1)	Santos (4)	22,327	6–5	–
12	April 12	@ Orioles	1–2 (12)	Britton (2–0)	Redmond (0–1)		30,446	6–6	1
13	April 13	@ Orioles	11–3	Buehrle (3–0)	Jiménez (0–3)		39,281	7–6	–
14	April 15	@ Twins	9–3	Loup (1–0)	Hughes (0–1)		21,818	8–6	+½
–	April 16	@ Twins	Postponed (snow). Makeup date: April 17.						
15	April 17	@ Twins	0–7	Gibson (3–0)	Dickey (1–3)		20,507	8–7	1½
16	April 17	@ Twins	5–9	Fien (3–0)	Santos (0–1)		20,698	8–8	2
17	April 18	@ Indians	3–2	Delabar (1–0)	Rzepczynski (0–1)	Santos (5)	16,335	9–8	1
18	April 19	@ Indians	5–0	Buehrle (4–0)	Kluber (1–2)		15,188	10–8	–
19	April 20	@ Indians	4–6	Outman (3–0)	Loup (1–1)	Axford (6)	11,716	10–9	1
20	April 22	Orioles	9–3	Delabar (2–0)	Meek (0–1)		14,866	11–9	1
21	April 23	Orioles	8–10	Tillman (3–1)	Redmond (0–2)	Hunter (6)	15,202	11–10	1
22	April 24	Orioles	4–11	Norris (1–2)	Cecil (0–1)		16,283	11–11	2
23	April 25	Red Sox	1–8	Peavy (1–0)	Buehrle (4–1)		29,411	11–12	2
24	April 26	Red Sox	6–7	Buchholz (1–2)	Morrow (1–2)	Uehara (5)	40,322	11–13	3
25	April 27	Red Sox	7–1	Dickey (2–3)	Lester (2–4)		45,260	12–13	3
26	April 29	@ Royals	7–10	Crow (1–1)	Cecil (0–2)		10,705	12–14	3
27	April 30	@ Royals	2–4	Herrera (1–1)	Hutchison (1–2)	Holland (7)	11,715	12–15	3½

May: 21–9 (Home: 12–6; Road: 9–3)

#	Date	Opponent	Score	Win	Loss	Save	Attendance	Record	GB
28	May 1	@ Royals	7–3	Buehrle (5–1)	Guthrie (2–2)	Loup (1)	11,207	13–15	2½
29	May 2	@ Pirates	5–6	Melancon (1–1)	Santos (0–2)		24,547	13–16	3
30	May 3	@ Pirates	6–8	Morris (3–0)	Redmond (0–3)	Melancon (1)	31,439	13–17	3½
31	May 4	@ Pirates	7–2	McGowan (2–1)	Vólquez (1–3)		29,496	14–17	2½
32	May 5	@ Phillies	3–0	Happ (1–0)	Kendrick (0–3)	Cecil (2)	25,275	15–17	1½
33	May 6	@ Phillies	6–5 (10)	Stroman (1–0)	Bastardo (3–2)	Loup (2)	26,057	16–17	1½
34	May 7	Phillies	10–0	Buehrle (6–1)	Lee (3–3)		16,446	17–17	1½
35	May 8	Phillies	12–6	Dickey (3–3)	Burnett (2–2)		18,158	18–17	1½
36	May 9	Angels	3–4	Smith (2–0)	Cecil (0–3)	Frieri (4)	21,383	18–18	2½
37	May 10	Angels	3–5	Skaggs (3–1)	Happ (1–1)	Smith (4)	31,412	18–19	3½
38	May 11	Angels	3–9	Weaver (4–2)	Hutchison (1–3)		20,871	18–20	3½
39	May 12	Angels	7–3	Buehrle (7–1)	Wilson (4–3)		13,603	19–20	2½
40	May 13	Indians	5–4	Dickey (4–3)	Masterson (2–2)	Janssen (1)	13,673	20–20	1½
41	May 14	Indians	4–15	Kluber (4–3)	McGowan (2–2)		14,068	20–21	1½
42	May 15	Indians	4–2	Happ (2–1)	Salazar (1–4)	Janssen (2)	17,364	21–21	1½
43	May 16	@ Rangers	2–0	Hutchison (2–3)	Darvish (3–2)		39,129	22–21	1½
44	May 17	@ Rangers	4–2	Delabar (3–0)	Cotts (1–3)	Janssen (3)	39,723	23–21	½
45	May 18	@ Rangers	2–6	Poreda (2–0)	Dickey (4–4)		43,671	23–22	1
46	May 20	@ Red Sox	7–4	Happ (3–1)	Doubront (2–4)	Janssen (4)	37,904	24–22	½
47	May 21	@ Red Sox	6–4	Hutchison (3–3)	Buchholz (2–4)	Janssen (5)	36,116	25–22	–
48	May 22	@ Red Sox	7–2	Buehrle (8–1)	Lester (4–6)		36,018	26–22	+1
49	May 23	Athletics	3–2	Hendriks (1–0)	Kazmir (5–2)	Janssen (6)	21,007	27–22	+1½
50	May 24	Athletics	5–2	Dickey (5–4)	Chavez (4–2)	Cecil (3)	29,372	28–22	+2
51	May 25	Athletics	3–1	Happ (4–1)	Pomeranz (4–2)	Janssen (7)	45,277	29–22	+2
52	May 26	Rays	10–5	Hutchison (4–3)	Bédard (2–3)		15,616	30–22	+2
53	May 27	Rays	9–6	Buehrle (9–1)	Cobb (1–2)	Janssen (8)	15,993	31–22	+3
54	May 28	Rays	3–2	Loup (2–1)	Oviedo (1–1)		17,309	32–22	+3
55	May 29	Royals	6–8 (10)	Davis (4–1)	Redmond (0–4)	Holland (15)	17,978	32–23	+2½
56	May 30	Royals	1–6	Vargas (5–2)	Happ (4–2)		21,543	32–24	+2½
57	May 31	Royals	12–2	Stroman (2–0)	Brooks (0–1)	Redmond (1)	31,652	33–24	+2½

June: 12–15 (Home: 6–8; Road: 6–7)

#	Date	Opponent	Score	Win	Loss	Save	Attendance	Record	GB
58	June 1	Royals	4–0	Buehrle (10–1)	Guthrie (2–5)		38,008	34–24	+3½
59	June 3	@ Tigers	5–3	McGowan (3–2)	Nathan (2–2)	Janssen (9)	33,488	35–24	+4½
60	June 4	@ Tigers	8–2	Dickey (6–4)	Porcello (8–3)		32,033	36–24	+4½
61	June 5	@ Tigers	7–3	Happ (5–2)	Verlander (6–5)	Janssen (10)	39,440	37–24	+5½
62	June 6	Cardinals	3–1	Stroman (3–0)	Lynn (6–4)	Janssen (11)	33,528	38–24	+6
63	June 7	Cardinals	0–5	Miller (7–5)	Buehrle (10–2)		42,981	38–25	+5½
64	June 8	Cardinals	0–5	García (2–0)	Hutchison (4–4)		45,726	38–26	+5½
65	June 9	Twins	5–4	Janssen (1–0)	Guerrier (0–1)		19,428	39–26	+5½
66	June 10	Twins	0–4	Correia (3–7)	Happ (5–3)		20,681	39–27	+5½
67	June 11	Twins	2–7	Hughes (7–2)	Stroman (3–1)		45,080	39–28	+4½
68	June 12	@ Orioles	2–4	Gausman (2–1)	Buehrle (10–3)	Britton (6)	17,403	39–29	+3½
69	June 13	@ Orioles	4–0	Hutchison (5–4)	Jiménez (2–8)	McGowan (1)	44,031	40–29	+3½
70	June 14	@ Orioles	2–3	Norris (6–5)	Dickey (6–5)	Britton (7)	33,901	40–30	+3½
71	June 15	@ Orioles	5–2	Happ (6–3)	Tillman (5–4)	Janssen (12)	46,469	41–30	+4½
72	June 17	@ Yankees	1–3	Tanaka (11–1)	Stroman (3–2)	Robertson (17)	41,834	41–31	+3½
73	June 18	@ Yankees	3–7	Whitley (3–0)	Buehrle (10–4)		41,342	41–32	+2½
74	June 19	@ Yankees	4–6	Phelps (3–4)	Hutchison (5–5)	Warren (2)	40,169	41–33	+1½
75	June 20	@ Reds	14–9	McGowan (4–2)	Chapman (0–2)		33,103	42–33	+1½
76	June 21	@ Reds	1–11	Leake (5–6)	Happ (6–4)		42,530	42–34	+1½
77	June 22	@ Reds	3–4	Cueto (7–5)	Dickey (6–6)	Chapman (13)	36,089	42–35	+1½
78	June 23	Yankees	8–3	Stroman (4–2)	Whitley (3–1)		31,554	43–35	+1½
79	June 24	Yankees	7–6	Janssen (2–0)	Warren (1–4)		34,206	44–35	+2½
80	June 25	Yankees	3–5	Kuroda (5–5)	Hutchison (5–6)	Robertson (18)	34,710	44–36	+1½
81	June 26	White Sox	7–0	Happ (7–4)	Carroll (2–4)		23,248	45–36	+2
82	June 27	White Sox	4–5	Danks (7–6)	Dickey (6–7)	Petricka (2)	24,173	45–37	+1½
83	June 28	White Sox	3–4	Sale (7–1)	McGowan (4–3)	Putnam (1)	39,623	45–38	+1½
84	June 29	White Sox	0–4	Quintana (5–7)	Buehrle (10–5)		33,177	45–39	+1½

July: 15–11 (Home: 7–2; Road: 8–9)

#	Date	Opponent	Score	Win	Loss	Save	Attendance	Record	GB
85	July 1	Brewers	4–1	Hutchison (6–6)	Estrada (7–5)	Janssen (13)	45,088	46–39	+1
86	July 2	Brewers	7–4	Janssen (3–0)	Smith (1–1)		24,286	47–39	+1
87	July 3	@ Athletics	1–4	Gray (8–3)	Dickey (6–8)	Doolittle (12)	32,913	47–40	–
88	July 4	@ Athletics	0–1 (12)	Otero (7–1)	Jenkins (0–1)		22,322	47–41	½
89	July 5	@ Athletics	1–5	Kazmir (10–3)	Buehrle (10–6)		20,236	47–42	1
90	July 6	@ Athletics	2–4	Samardzija (3–7)	Hutchison (6–7)	Doolittle (13)	22,897	47–43	2
91	July 7	@ Angels	2–5	Shoemaker (7–2)	Happ (7–5)	Smith (11)	38,189	47–44	3
92	July 8	@ Angels	4–0	Dickey (7–8)	Skaggs (4–5)		38,111	48–44	2½
93	July 9	@ Angels	7–8	Grilli (1–3)	Loup (2–2)	Smith (12)	35,726	48–45	2½
94	July 11	@ Rays	8–5	Loup (3–2)	Balfour (0–3)	Janssen (14)	17,533	49–45	3
95	July 12	@ Rays	3–10	Odorizzi (5–8)	Hutchison (6–8)		22,693	49–46	3
96	July 13	@ Rays	0–3	Price (9–7)	Dickey (7–9)	McGee (7)	17,187	49–47	4
97	July 18	Rangers	1–5	Darvish (9–5)	Dickey (7–10)		38,012	49–48	4
98	July 19	Rangers	4–1	Stroman (5–2)	Lewis (6–7)	Loup (3)	45,802	50–48	4
99	July 20	Rangers	9–6	Redmond (1–4)	Feliz (0–1)	Loup (4)	36,011	51–48	3
100	July 21	Red Sox	1–14	Lackey (11–6)	Hutchison (6–9)		27,905	51–49	4
101	July 22	Red Sox	7–3	Happ (8–5)	Peavy (1–9)	Cecil (4)	29,269	52–49	4
102	July 23	Red Sox	6–4	Dickey (8–10)	Buchholz (5–6)	Janssen (15)	35,696	53–49	3
103	July 24	Red Sox	8–0	Stroman (6–2)	De La Rosa (3–3)		46,683	54–49	3
104	July 25	@ Yankees	4–6	Kuroda (7–6)	Buehrle (10–7)	Robertson (26)	44,237	54–50	4
105	July 26	@ Yankees	6–4	Hutchison (7–9)	Kelley (1–3)		46,166	55–50	3
106	July 27	@ Yankees	5–4	Sanchez (1–0)	Robertson (1–3)	Janssen (16)	45,063	56–50	3
107	July 28	@ Red Sox	14–1	Dickey (9–10)	Buchholz (5–7)		37,974	57–50	2½
108	July 29	@ Red Sox	4–2	Stroman (7–2)	De La Rosa (3–4)	Janssen (17)	38,275	58–50	2½
109	July 30	@ Red Sox	6–1	Buehrle (11–7)	Workman (1–4)		38,203	59–50	2½
110	July 31	@ Astros	6–5	Sanchez (2–0)	Qualls (1–3)	Janssen (18)	17,423	60–50	1½

August: 9–17 (Home: 7–8; Road: 2–9)

#	Date	Opponent	Score	Win	Loss	Save	Attendance	Record	GB
111	August 1	@ Astros	1–3	Veras (1–1)	Loup (3–3)	Qualls (12)	19,576	60–51	2½
112	August 2	@ Astros	2–8	Oberholtzer (4–7)	Dickey (9–11)		19,946	60–52	2½
113	August 3	@ Astros	1–6	Feldman (5–8)	Stroman (7–3)		19,932	60–53	3½
114	August 5	Orioles	3–9	Norris (9–7)	Buehrle (11–8)		36,183	60–54	5
115	August 6	Orioles	5–1	Hutchison (8–9)	Chen (12–4)		33,054	61–54	4
116	August 7	Orioles	1–2	González (6–6)	Happ (8–6)	Britton (24)	34,676	61–55	5
117	August 8	Tigers	4–5	Alburquerque (3–1)	Janssen (3–1)	Nathan (24)	36,237	61–56	6
118	August 9	Tigers	3–2 (10)	Loup (4–3)	Chamberlain (1–5)		45,927	62–56	6
119	August 10	Tigers	6–5 (19)	Jenkins (1–1)	Porcello (13–7)		46,126	63–56	5
120	August 11	@ Mariners	1–11	Hernández (13–3)	Hutchison (8–10)		41,168	63–57	6
121	August 12	@ Mariners	3–6	Young (11–6)	Happ (8–7)	Rodney (34)	26,076	63–58	6½
122	August 13	@ Mariners	0–2	Iwakuma (11–6)	Dickey (9–12)	Rodney (35)	32,368	63–59	7½
123	August 15	@ White Sox	5–11	Noesí (7–8)	Stroman (7–4)		22,739	63–60	7½
124	August 16	@ White Sox	6–3	Cecil (1–3)	Lindstrom (2–2)	Janssen (19)	29,420	64–60	6½
125	August 17	@ White Sox	5–7	Caroll (5–7)	Hutchison (8–11)	Petricka (9)	25,761	64–61	7½
126	August 19	@ Brewers	1–6	Fiers (3–1)	Happ (8–8)		42,221	64–62	9
127	August 20	@ Brewers	9–5	Dickey (10–12)	Nelson (2–4)		39,300	65–62	9
128	August 22	Rays	0–8	Smyly (8–10)	Stroman (7–5)		28,506	65–63	9
129	August 23	Rays	5–4 (10)	McGowan (5–3)	Peralta (2–4)		37,451	66–63	8
130	August 24	Rays	1–2 (10)	McGee (4–1)	Santos (0–3)	Boxberger (2)	38,869	66–64	8
131	August 25	Red Sox	3–4 (10)	Uehara (6–4)	Sanchez (2–1)	Breslow (1)	26,041	66-65	9
132	August 26	Red Sox	7–11 (11)	Tazawa (3–3)	Janssen (3–2)		27,321	66–66	10
133	August 27	Red Sox	5–2	Stroman (8–5)	Layne (1–1)	Cecil (5)	30,285	67–66	9
134	August 29	Yankees	3–6	Capuano (2–3)	Buehrle (11–9)	Robertson (35)	43,318	67–67	10½
135	August 30	Yankees	2–0	Hutchison (9–11)	Pineda (3–3)	Sanchez (1)	45,863	68–67	10½
136	August 31	Yankees	4–3	Happ (9–8)	McCarthy (8–14)	Janssen (20)	45,678	69–67	10½

September: 14–12 (Home: 9–4; Road: 5–8)

#	Date	Opponent	Score	Win	Loss	Save	Attendance	Record	GB
137	September 2	@ Rays	8–2	Dickey (11–12)	Hellickson (1–3)		10,125	70–67	10
138	September 3	@ Rays	7–4	Stroman (9–5)	Archer (8–8)	Sanchez (2)	10,264	71–67	10
139	September 4	@ Rays	1–0 (10)	Cecil (2–3)	Geltz (0–1)	Janssen (21)	10,392	72–67	10
140	September 5	@ Red Sox	8–9 (10)	Layne (2–1)	Janssen (3–3)		35,667	72–68	10
141	September 6	@ Red Sox	3–4	Buchholz (7–8)	Happ (9–9)	Mujica (4)	36,677	72–69	10
142	September 7	@ Red Sox	3–1	Dickey (12–12)	De La Rosa (4–6)	Janssen (22)	36,261	73–69	10
143	September 8	Cubs	8–0	Stroman (10–5)	Turner (5–9)		16,879	74–69	10
144	September 9	Cubs	9–2	Buehrle (12–9)	Ramirez (2–2)		17,903	75–69	10
145	September 10	Cubs	11–1	Hutchison (10–11)	Hendricks (6–2)		19,411	76–69	10
146	September 12	Rays	0–1	Karns (1–0)	Happ (9–10)	Balfour (12)	19,909	76–70	11½
147	September 13	Rays	6–3	Dickey (13–12)	Boxberger (5–2)	Janssen (23)	31,368	77–70	10½
148	September 14	Rays	5–6 (10)	McGee (5–2)	Morrow (1–3)	Beliveau (1)	28,633	77–71	11½
149	September 15	@ Orioles	2–5	Chen (16–4)	Stroman (10–6)	Britton (35)	25,061	77–72	12½
150	September 16	@ Orioles	2–8	Jiménez (5–9)	Hutchison (10–12)		35,297	77–73	13½
151	September 17	@ Orioles	1–6	Norris (14–8)	Happ (9–11)		37,537	77–74	14½
152	September 18	@ Yankees	2–3	Robertson (3–5)	Sanchez (2–2)		34,279	77–75	15
153	September 19	@ Yankees	3–5	Kuroda (11–9)	Buehrle (12–10)	Warren (3)	40,059	77–76	15
154	September 20	@ Yankees	6–3	Stroman (11–6)	Capuano (2–4)	Janssen (24)	47,292	78–76	15
155	September 21	@ Yankees	2–5	Tanaka (13–4)	Hutchison (10–13)	Robertson (38)	48,144	78–77	15
156	September 22	Mariners	14–4	Happ (10–11)	Paxton (6–4)		15,548	79–77	14
157	September 23	Mariners	10–2	Dickey (14–12)	Hernández (14–6)		16,272	80–77	14
158	September 24	Mariners	1–0	Buehrle (13–10)	Walker (2–3)	Sanchez (3)	16,836	81–77	14
159	September 25	Mariners	5–7	Medina (5–3)	Loup (4–4)	Rodney (47)	17,173	81–78	14
160	September 26	Orioles	4–2	Hutchison (11–13)	Tillman (13–6)	Stroman (1)	27,037	82–78	13
161	September 27	Orioles	4–2	Happ (11–11)	Chen (16–6)	Janssen (24)	37,996	83–78	12
162	September 28	Orioles	0–1	González (10–9)	Dickey (14–13)	Britton (37)	45,901	83–79	13

=== Roster ===
2014 Toronto Blue Jays
Roster
Pitchers: 56 Mark Buehrle; 27 Brett Cecil; 50 Steve Delabar; 43 R. A. Dickey; 4 Kyle Drabek; 31 Kendall Graveman; 48 J. A. Happ; 39 Liam Hendriks; 36 Drew Hutchison; 44 Casey Janssen; 33 Jeremy Jeffress; 64 Chad Jenkins; 51 Bobby Korecky; 62 Aaron Loup; 29 Dustin McGowan; 38 Brad Mills; 23 Brandon Morrow; 35 Sean Nolin; 32 Daniel Norris; 59 Rob Rasmussen; 58 Todd Redmond; 32 Esmil Rogers; 41 Aaron Sanchez; 21 Sergio Santos; 54 Marcus Stroman; 45 Neil Wagner	Catchers: 14 George Kottaras; 31 Erik Kratz; 30 Dioner Navarro; 22 Josh Thole; Infielders: 1 Jonathan Diaz; 10 Edwin Encarnación; 47 Juan Francisco; 39 Chris Getz; 17 Ryan Goins; 3 Maicer Izturis; 16 Dan Johnson; 66 Munenori Kawasaki; 13 Brett Lawrie; 26 Adam Lind; 9 John Mayberry Jr.; 7 José Reyes; 18 Steve Tolleson; 15 Danny Valencia	Outfielders: 19 José Bautista; 53 Melky Cabrera; 9 Cole Gillespie; 55 Brad Glenn; 8 Anthony Gose; 33 Darin Mastroianni; 11 Kevin Pillar; 45 Dalton Pompey; 28 Colby Rasmus; 14 Nolan Reimold; 14 Moisés Sierra	Manager: 5 John Gibbons; Coaches: 61 Alex Andreopoulos (bullpen catcher); 57 Sal Butera (video replay); 20 DeMarlo Hale (bench); 34 Tim Leiper (first base); 2 Luis Rivera (third base); 25 Kevin Seitzer (hitting); 46 Bob Stanley (bullpen); 40 Pete Walker (pitching)

== Player stats ==
=== Batting ===
Note: G = Games played; AB = At bats; R = Runs; H = Hits; 2B = Doubles; 3B = Triples; HR = Home runs; RBI = Runs batted in; SB = Stolen bases; BB = Walks; AVG = Batting average; SLG = Slugging average

Player	G	AB	R	H	2B	3B	HR	RBI	SB	BB	AVG	SLG
José Reyes	143	610	94	175	33	4	9	51	30	38	.287	.398
Melky Cabrera	139	568	81	171	35	3	16	73	6	43	.301	.458
José Bautista	155	553	101	158	27	0	35	103	6	104	.286	.524
Dioner Navarro	139	481	40	132	22	0	12	69	3	32	.274	.395
Edwin Encarnación	128	477	75	128	27	2	34	98	2	62	.268	.547
Colby Rasmus	104	346	45	78	21	1	18	40	4	29	.225	.448
Adam Lind	96	290	38	93	24	2	6	40	0	28	.321	.479
Juan Francisco	106	287	40	63	16	2	16	43	0	27	.220	.456
Brett Lawrie	70	259	27	64	9	0	12	38	0	16	.247	.421
Munenori Kawasaki	82	240	31	62	7	1	0	17	1	22	.258	.296
Anthony Gose	94	239	31	54	8	1	2	13	15	25	.226	.293
Ryan Goins	67	181	14	34	6	3	1	15	0	5	.188	.271
Steven Tolleson	108	170	21	43	7	2	3	16	3	12	.253	.371
Danny Valencia	50	154	12	37	11	1	2	19	1	7	.240	.364
Josh Thole	57	133	11	33	4	0	0	7	0	14	.248	.278
Kevin Pillar	53	116	19	31	9	0	2	7	1	4	.267	.397
Erik Kratz	34	81	8	16	3	0	3	10	0	3	.198	.346
Nolan Reimold	22	52	3	11	4	0	2	9	1	6	.212	.404
Dalton Pompey	17	39	5	9	1	2	1	4	1	4	.231	.436
Dan Johnson	15	38	8	8	2	0	1	7	0	7	.211	.342
Jonathan Diaz	23	38	3	6	1	0	0	4	1	3	.158	.184
Maicer Izturis	11	35	3	10	1	0	0	1	1	2	.286	.314
Moisés Sierra	13	34	2	2	0	0	0	2	0	1	.059	.059
Darin Mastroianni	14	32	4	5	0	0	1	2	0	0	.156	.250
Chris Getz	10	25	1	4	1	0	0	0	2	1	.160	.200
John Mayberry Jr.	15	24	4	5	3	0	1	2	0	5	.208	.458
Brad Glenn	6	15	0	1	0	0	0	0	0	1	.067	.067
George Kottaras	4	4	0	0	0	0	0	0	0	1	.000	.000
Cole Gillespie	1	3	0	0	0	0	0	0	0	0	.000	.000
Pitcher totals	162	25	2	2	0	0	0	0	0	0	.080	.080
Team totals	162	5549	723	1435	282	24	177	690	78	502	.259	.414

=== Pitching ===
Note: W = Wins; L = Losses; ERA = Earned run average; G = Games pitched; GS = Games started; SV = Saves; IP = Innings pitched; H = Hits allowed; R = Runs allowed; ER = Earned runs allowed; BB = Walks allowed; SO = Strikeouts

Player	W	L	ERA	G	GS	SV	IP	H	R	ER	BB	SO
R.A. Dickey	14	13	3.71	34	34	0	215.2	191	101	89	74	173
Mark Buehrle	13	10	3.39	32	32	0	202.0	228	83	76	46	119
Drew Hutchison	11	13	4.48	32	32	0	184.2	173	92	92	60	184
J.A. Happ	11	11	4.22	30	26	0	158.0	160	79	74	51	133
Marcus Stroman	11	6	3.65	26	20	1	130.2	125	56	53	28	111
Dustin McGowan	5	3	4.17	53	8	1	82.0	80	41	38	33	61
Todd Redmond	1	4	3.24	42	0	1	75.0	73	33	27	27	60
Aaron Loup	4	4	3.15	71	0	4	68.2	50	25	24	30	56
Brett Cecil	2	3	2.70	66	0	5	53.1	46	16	16	27	76
Casey Janssen	3	3	3.94	50	0	25	45.2	47	22	20	7	28
Brandon Morrow	1	3	5.67	13	6	0	33.1	37	21	21	18	30
Aaron Sanchez	2	2	1.09	24	0	3	33.0	14	5	4	9	27
Chad Jenkins	1	1	2.56	21	0	0	31.2	34	10	9	6	18
Steve Delabar	3	0	4.91	30	0	0	25.2	19	14	14	19	21
Sergio Santos	0	3	8.57	26	0	5	21.0	28	22	20	18	29
Esmil Rogers	0	0	6.97	16	0	0	20.2	28	17	16	7	21
Liam Hendriks	1	0	6.08	3	3	0	13.1	12	9	9	4	8
Rob Rasmussen	0	0	3.18	10	0	0	11.1	8	4	4	7	13
Neil Wagner	0	0	8.10	10	0	0	10.0	12	9	9	4	6
Daniel Norris	0	0	5.40	5	1	0	6.2	5	4	4	5	4
Kendall Graveman	0	0	3.86	5	0	0	4.2	4	2	2	0	4
Brad Mills	0	0	27.00	2	0	0	4.1	10	13	13	4	5
Jeremy Jeffress	0	0	10.80	3	0	0	3.1	8	4	4	3	4
Bobby Korecky	0	0	8.10	2	0	0	3.1	4	3	3	1	2
Kyle Drabek	0	0	0.00	2	0	0	3.0	2	0	0	2	5
Sean Nolin	0	0	9.00	1	0	0	1.0	1	1	1	0	0
Steve Tolleson	0	0	0.00	2	0	0	1.0	1	0	0	0	1
Team totals	83	79	4.00	162	162	45	1443.0	1400	686	642	490	1199

== Awards and honors ==
All-Star Game

- Jose Bautista, Outfield, Starter
- Edwin Encarnacion, Designated Hitter, Reserve
- Mark Buehrle, Pitcher, Reserve

== Farm system ==
Level	Team	League	Manager
AAA	Buffalo Bisons	International League	Gary Allenson
AA	New Hampshire Fisher Cats	Eastern League	Bobby Meacham
A	Dunedin Blue Jays	Florida State League	Omar Malavé
A	Lansing Lugnuts	Midwest League	John Tamargo, Jr.
A-Short Season	Vancouver Canadians	Northwest League	John Schneider
Rookie	Bluefield Blue Jays	Appalachian League	Dennis Holmberg
Rookie	GCL Blue Jays	Gulf Coast League	Kenny Graham
