= 2014 Tampa Bay Rays season =

2014 Tampa Bay Rays
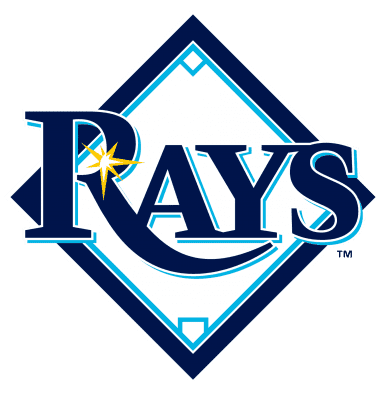
- League: American League
- Division: East
- Ballpark: Tropicana Field
- City: St. Petersburg, Florida
- Record: 77–85 (.475)
- Divisional place: 4th
- Owners: Stuart Sternberg
- General managers: Andrew Friedman (de facto)
- Managers: Joe Maddon
- Television: Sun Sports (Dewayne Staats, Brian Anderson, Todd Kalas)
- Radio: Tampa Bay Rays Radio Network (English) (Andy Freed, Dave Wills, Todd Kalas); WGES (Spanish) (Ricardo Taveras, Enrique Oliu)

The Tampa Bay Rays 2014 season was the Rays' 17th season of Major League Baseball and the seventh as the "Rays" (all at Tropicana Field). The team finished at 77–85, their first losing season as the "Rays".

== Season standings ==
=== American League East ===
AL East
Team	W	L	Pct.	GB	Home	Road
Baltimore Orioles	96	66	.593	—	50‍–‍31	46‍–‍35
New York Yankees	84	78	.519	12	43‍–‍38	41‍–‍40
Toronto Blue Jays	83	79	.512	13	46‍–‍35	37‍–‍44
Tampa Bay Rays	77	85	.475	19	36‍–‍45	41‍–‍40
Boston Red Sox	71	91	.438	25	34‍–‍47	37‍–‍44

=== American League Wild Card ===
Division leaders
Team	W	L	Pct.
Los Angeles Angels of Anaheim	98	64	.605
Baltimore Orioles	96	66	.593
Detroit Tigers	90	72	.556

Wild Card teams (Top 2 teams qualify for postseason)
Team	W	L	Pct.	GB
Kansas City Royals	89	73	.549	+1
Oakland Athletics	88	74	.543	—
Seattle Mariners	87	75	.537	1
Cleveland Indians	85	77	.525	3
New York Yankees	84	78	.519	4
Toronto Blue Jays	83	79	.512	5
Tampa Bay Rays	77	85	.475	11
Chicago White Sox	73	89	.451	15
Boston Red Sox	71	91	.438	17
Houston Astros	70	92	.432	18
Minnesota Twins	70	92	.432	18
Texas Rangers	67	95	.414	21

=== Record vs. opponents ===
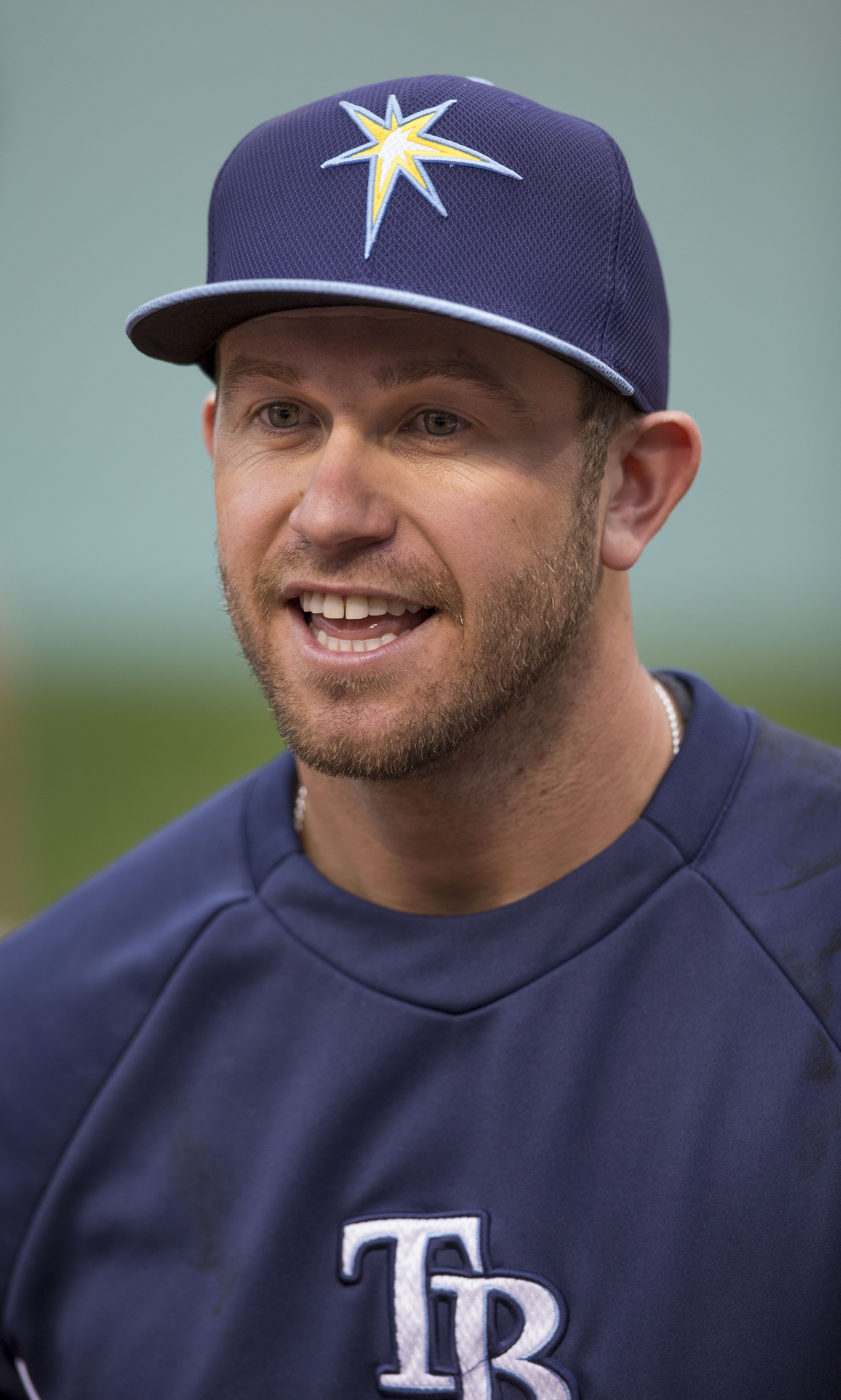
Evan Longoria in April 2014.

2014 American League record Source: MLB Standings Grid – 2014
Team	BAL	BOS	CWS	CLE	DET	HOU	KC	LAA	MIN	NYY	OAK	SEA	TB	TEX	TOR	NL
Baltimore	—	11–8	5–1	3–4	1–5	4–3	3–4	4–2	4–3	13–6	2–4	5–2	12–7	6–1	11–8	12–8
Boston	8–11	—	4–3	2–5	1–5	4–3	6–1	2–5	4–2	7–12	3–4	1–5	9–10	4–2	7–12	9–11
Chicago	1–5	3–4	—	9–10	9–10	3–3	6–13	1–5	9–10	2–5	4–3	3–4	5–2	2–4	5–2	11–9
Cleveland	4–3	5–2	10–9	—	8–11	5–2	10–9	2–5	11–8	4–3	2–4	2–4	4–2	6–1	2–4	10–10
Detroit	5–1	5–1	10–9	11–8	—	4–3	13–6	3–4	9–10	3–4	5–2	2–4	3–4	4–3	1–5	12–8
Houston	3–4	3–4	3–3	2–5	3–4	—	3–3	7–12	3–3	4–2	8–11	9–10	2–5	11–8	4–3	5–15
Kansas City	4–3	1–6	13–6	9–10	6–13	3–3	—	3–3	11–8	4–3	5–2	2–5	4–2	5–1	4–3	15–5
Los Angeles	2–4	5–2	5–1	5–2	4–3	12–7	3–3	—	7–0	2–4	10–9	7–12	5–2	14–5	5–2	12–8
Minnesota	3–4	2–4	10–9	8–11	10–9	3–3	8–11	0–7	—	3–4	1–6	5–2	2–4	2–5	4–2	9–11
New York	6–13	12–7	5–2	3–4	4–3	2–4	3–4	4–2	4–3	—	2–4	3–3	8–11	4–3	11–8	13–7
Oakland	4–2	4–3	3–4	4–2	2–5	11–8	2–5	9–10	6–1	4–2	—	9–10	4–2	9–10	4–3	13–7
Seattle	2–5	5–1	4–3	4–2	4–2	10–9	5–2	12–7	2–5	3–3	10–9	—	4–3	9–10	4–3	9–11
Tampa Bay	7–12	10–9	2–5	2–4	4–3	5–2	2–4	2–5	4–2	11–8	2–4	3–4	—	5–2	8–11	10–10
Texas	1–6	2–4	4–2	1–6	3–4	8–11	1–5	5–14	5–2	3–4	10–9	10–9	2–5	—	2–4	10–10
Toronto	8–11	12–7	2–5	4–2	5–1	3–4	3–4	2–5	2–4	8–11	3–4	3–4	11–8	4–2	—	13–7

== Regular season summary ==
The Rays 2014 season started out harsh entering May. Tampa Bay went 11–16 since opening day and was struggling to move up in the American League East early on. In addition to their rough first month of baseball, May did not do any favors. In May the Rays posted a 12–17 record. To make things worse, 2014 was being played without Matt Moore in their rotation and numerous other injuries (along with Moore's) may have begun to take a toll on the Rays' recent tendencies to make playoff runs.

In June the Rays went 13–16 and followed that with an amazing July where they won 17 games and lost only 6. During the All Star Break, David Price was recognized as the only Tampa Bay representative. Price, Zobrist, and a few other Rays were in the midst of trade rumors. Price was dealt to the Detroit Tigers at the trade deadline in a three-way deal with Seattle. The Rays acquired Nick Franklin from Seattle and Drew Smyly from Detroit. Some analysts felt the Rays deserved more for David Price. After all, they gave the Tigers the 2012 American League Cy Young Award Winner to their rotation. (Detroit now had the previous three Cy Young Award winners in the American League in their rotation)

== Season log ==
=== Regular season ===
2014 Game Log (77–85)
March/April (11–16)

#	Date	Opponent	Score	Win	Loss	Save	Attendance	Record	Recap
1	March 31	Blue Jays	9–2	Price (1–0)	Dickey (0–1)	—	31,042	1–0	
2	April 1	Blue Jays	2–4	Hutchison (1–0)	Cobb (0–1)	Santos (1)	11,113	1–1	
3	April 2	Blue Jays	0–3	Buehrle (1–0)	Moore (0–1)	Cecil (1)	10,808	1–2	
4	April 3	Blue Jays	7–2	Archer (1–0)	Morrow (0–1)	—	9,571	2–2	
5	April 4	Rangers	8–1	Odorizzi (1–0)	Saunders (0–1)	—	14,304	3–2	
6	April 5	Rangers	5–4	Gomes (1–0)	Cotts (0–1)	Balfour (1)	30,364	4–2	
7	April 6	Rangers	0–3	Darvish (1–0)	Peralta (0–1)	Soria (1)	22,569	4–3	
8	April 7	@ Royals	2–4	Vargas (1–0)	Moore (0–2)	Holland (3)	12,087	4–4	
9	April 8	@ Royals	1–0	Peralta (1–1)	Holland (0–1)	Balfour (2)	13,905	5–4	
10	April 9	@ Royals	3–7	Guthrie (2–0)	Odorizzi (1–1)	—	13,612	5–5	
11	April 11	@ Reds	2–1	Price (2–0)	Cueto (0–2)	Balfour (3)	30,502	6–5	
12	April 12	@ Reds	1–0	Cobb (1–1)	Simón (1–1)	Balfour (4)	35,356	7–5	
13	April 13	@ Reds	4–12	Cingrani (1–1)	Ramos (0–1)	—	34,307	7–6	
14	April 14	@ Orioles	1–7	Chen (2–1)	Archer (1–1)	—	15,799	7–7	
—	April 15	@ Orioles	Postponed (rain); Makeup: June 27						
15	April 16	@ Orioles	0–3	González (1–1)	Odorizzi (1–2)	Hunter (4)	22,611	7–8	
16	April 17	Yankees	2–10	Sabathia (2–2)	Price (2–1)	—	28,085	7–9	
17	April 18	Yankees	11–5	McGee (1–0)	Warren (0–1)	—	26,079	8–9	
18	April 19	Yankees	16–1	Archer (2–1)	Nova (2–2)	—	30,159	9–9	
19	April 20	Yankees	1–5 (12)	Claiborne (1–0)	Bell (0–1)	—	26,462	9–10	
20	April 22	Twins	7–3	Price (3–1)	Gibson (3–1)	—	11,785	10–10	
21	April 23	Twins	4–6 (12)	Fien (3–0)	Lueke (0–1)	Perkins (4)	11,993	10–11	
22	April 24	Twins	7–9	Nolasco (2–2)	Bédard (0–1)	Perkins (5)	13,177	10–12	
23	April 25	@ White Sox	6–9	Lindstrom (2–1)	Balfour (0–1)	—	17,210	10–13	
24	April 26	@ White Sox	4–0	Ramos (1–1)	Danks (2–1)	—	22,412	11–13	
25	April 27	@ White Sox	2–9	Carroll (1–0)	Price (3–2)	—	17,313	11–14	
26	April 28	@ White Sox	3–7	Rienzo (2–0)	Odorizzi (1–3)	—	11,268	11–15	
27	April 29	@ Red Sox	4–7	Lackey (4–2)	Gomes (1–1)	Uehara (6)	34,794	11–16	
—	April 30	@ Red Sox	Postponed (rain); Makeup: May 1						

May (12–17)

#	Date	Opponent	Score	Win	Loss	Save	Attendance	Record	Recap
28	May 1 (1)	@ Red Sox	2–1	Gomes (2–1)	Peavy (1–1)	Balfour (5)	35,621	12–16	
29	May 1 (2)	@ Red Sox	6–5	McGee (2–0)	Uehara (0–1)	Balfour (6)	33,465	13–16	
30	May 2	@ Yankees	10–5 (14)	Bell (1–1)	Leroux (0–1)	—	33,580	14–16	
31	May 3	@ Yankees	3–9	Tanaka (4–0)	Lueke (0–2)	—	43,325	14–17	
32	May 4	@ Yankees	5–1	Bédard (1–1)	Sabathia (3–4)	—	41,122	15–17	
33	May 6	Orioles	3–5	O'Day (1–0)	Peralta (1–2)	Hunter (9)	11,855	15–18	
34	May 7	Orioles	3–4	Webb (1–0)	Gomes (2–2)	Hunter (10)	11,282	15–19	
35	May 8	Orioles	1–3	Jiménez (2–4)	Price (3–3)	O'Day (2–0)	11,076	15–20	
36	May 9	Indians	3–6	Kluber (3–3)	Peralta (1–3)	Allen (1)	17,541	15–21	
37	May 10	Indians	7–1	Bédard (2–1)	McAllister (3–3)	—	29,212	16–21	
38	May 11	Indians	5–6	Tomlin (2–0)	Archer (2–2)	Shaw (2)	23,679	16–22	
39	May 12	@ Mariners	5–12	Hernández (4–1)	Ramos (1–2)	—	12,392	16–23	
40	May 13	@ Mariners	2–1	Price (4–3)	Rodney (1–2)	—	13,446	17–23	
41	May 14	@ Mariners	2–0	Odorizzi (2–3)	Maurer (1–2)	Balfour (7)	20,951	18–23	
42	May 15	@ Angels	5–6	Salas (3–0)	Boxberger (0–1)	—	34,441	18–24	
43	May 16	@ Angels	3–0	Archer (3–2)	Weaver (4–3)	Balfour (8)	38,796	19–24	
44	May 17	@ Angels	0–6	Wilson (5–3)	Ramos (1–3)	—	42,224	19–25	
45	May 18	@ Angels	2–6	Shoemaker (2–1)	Price (4–4)	—	36,655	19–26	
46	May 20	Athletics	0–3	Pomeranz (4–1)	Odorizzi (2–4)	Doolittle (3)	11,369	19–27	
47	May 21	Athletics	2–3	Milone (2–3)	Bédard (2–2)	Doolittle (4)	10,555	19–28	
48	May 22	Athletics	5–2 (11)	Lueke (1–2)	Otero (4–1)	—	11,257	20–28	
49	May 23	Red Sox	1–0	Oviedo (1–0)	Miller (1–3)	—	20,898	21–28	
50	May 24	Red Sox	6–5 (15)	Ramos (2–3)	Miller (1–4)	—	23,569	22–28	
51	May 25	Red Sox	8–5	Peralta (2–3)	Breslow (2–1)	Balfour (9)	26,199	23–28	
52	May 26	@ Blue Jays	5–10	Hutchison (4–3)	Bédard (2–3)	—	15,616	23–29	
53	May 27	@ Blue Jays	6–9	Buehrle (9–1)	Cobb (1–2)	Janssen (8)	15,993	23–30	
54	May 28	@ Blue Jays	2–3	Loup (2–1)	Oviedo (1–1)	—	17,309	23–31	
55	May 30	@ Red Sox	2–3 (10)	Miller (2–4)	Oviedo (1–2)	—	35,820	23–32	
56	May 31	@ Red Sox	1–7	De La Rosa (1–0)	Odorizzi (2–5)	—	37,076	23–33	

June (13–16)

#	Date	Opponent	Score	Win	Loss	Save	Attendance	Record	Recap
57	June 1	@ Red Sox	0–4	Lester (6–6)	Bédard (2–4)	—	37,688	23–34	
58	June 2	@ Marlins	1–3	Wolf (1–1)	Cobb (1–3)	Cishek (12)	18,155	23–35	
59	June 3	@ Marlins	0–1	Álvarez (3–3)	Archer (3–3)	—	21,303	23–36	
60	June 4	Marlins	4–5	Koehler (5–5)	Price (4–5)	Cishek (13)	10,897	23–37	
61	June 5	Marlins	6–11	Turner (2–3)	Odorizzi (2–6)	—	10,442	23–38	
62	June 6	Mariners	4–0	Bédard (3–4)	Young (5–3)	—	14,577	24–38	
63	June 7	Mariners	4–7	Elías (5–4)	Cobb (1–4)	Rodney (17)	23,996	24–39	
64	June 8	Mariners	0–5	Medina (3–1)	Bafour (0–2)	—	18,158	24–40	
65	June 9	Mariners	0–3	Beimel (1–1)	Price (4–6)	Rodney (18)	10,400	24–41	
66	June 10	Cardinals	0–1	Wainwright (9–3)	Odorizzi (2–7)	Rosenthal (17)	17,226	24–42	
67	June 11	Cardinals	6–3	Oviedo (2–2)	Wacha (4–5)	Bafour (10)	15,930	25–42	
68	June 13	@ Astros	6–1	Cobb (2–4)	McHugh (4–4)	—	26,829	26–42	
69	June 14	@ Astros	3–7	Cosart (6–5)	Archer (3–4)	—	26,264	26–43	
70	June 15	@ Astros	4–3	Price (5–6)	Williams (1–3)	McGee (1)	25,526	27–43	
71	June 16	Orioles	5–4	McGee (3–0)	O'Day (2–1)	Oviedo (1)	10,576	28–43	
72	June 17	Orioles	5–7	González (4–4)	Bédard (3–5)	Britton (8)	10,803	28–44	
73	June 18	Orioles	0–2	Gausman (3–1)	Cobb (2–5)	Britton (9)	12,448	28–45	
74	June 19	Astros	5–0	Archer (4–4)	McHugh (4–5)	—	10,880	29–45	
75	June 20	Astros	1–3	Cosart (7–5)	Price (5–7)	Qualls (9)	13,861	29–46	
76	June 21	Astros	8–0	Odorizzi (3–7)	Buchanan (0–1)	—	17,551	30–46	
77	June 22	Astros	5–2	Oviedo (3–2)	Keuchel (8–5)	Peralta (1)	18,841	31–46	
78	June 23	Pirates	1–8	Vólquez (5–6)	Cobb (2–6)	—	13,175	31–47	
79	June 24	Pirates	5–6	Locke (1–1)	Archer (4–5)	Melancon (13)	14,684	31–48	
80	June 25	Pirates	5–1	Price (6–7)	Morton (4–9)	—	23,761	32–48	
81	June 27 (1)	@ Orioles	5–2	Colomé (1–0)	Gausman (3–2)	McGee (2)	15,614	33–48	
82	June 27 (2)	@ Orioles	1–4	Tillman (7–4)	Oviedo (3–3)	Britton (10)	34,895	33–49	
83	June 28	@ Orioles	5–4	Bédard (4–5)	Chen (7–3)	McGee (3)	36,387	34–49	
84	June 29	@ Orioles	12–7	Cobb (3–6)	Meek (0–3)	—	32,665	35–49	
85	June 30	@ Yankees	4–3 (12)	Boxberger (1–1)	Ramírez (0–2)	—	36,052	36–49	

July (17–6)

#	Date	Opponent	Score	Win	Loss	Save	Attendance	Record	Recap
86	July 1	@ Yankees	2–1	Price (7–7)	Kuroda (5–6)	Bafour (11)	35,866	37–49	
87	July 2	@ Yankees	6–3	Odorizzi (4–7)	Nuño (2–5)	Boxberger (1)	42,343	38–49	
88	July 3	@ Tigers	1–8	Scherzer (10–3)	Bédard (4–6)	—	33,908	38–50	
89	July 4	@ Tigers	6–3	Cobb (4–6)	Smyly (4–8)	McGee (4)	40,657	39–50	
90	July 5	@ Tigers	7–2	Archer (5–5)	Sánchez (5–3)	—	38,087	40–50	
91	July 6	@ Tigers	7–3	Price (8–7)	Porcello (11–5)	McGee (5)	31,917	41–50	
92	July 7	Royals	0–6	Shields (9–4)	Odorizzi (4–8)	—	13,406	41–51	
93	July 8	Royals	4–3	Boxberger (2–1)	Vargas (8–4)	McGee (6)	12,818	42–51	
94	July 9	Royals	4–5	Crow (4–1)	Yates (0–1)	Holland (24)	12,150	42–52	
95	July 11	Blue Jays	5–8	Loup (3–2)	Balfour (0–3)	Janssen (14)	17,533	42–53	
96	July 12	Blue Jays	10–3	Odorizzi (5–8)	Hutchison (6–8)	—	22,693	43–53	
97	July 13	Blue Jays	3–0	Price (9–7)	Dickey (7–9)	McGee (7)	17,187	44–53	
All-Star Break
98	July 18	@ Twins	6–2	Cobb (4–6)	Gibson (8–8)	—	31,058	45–53	
99	July 19	@ Twins	5–1	Price (10–7)	Hughes (10–6)	McGee (8)	36,117	46–53	
100	July 20	@ Twins	5–3	Archer (6–5)	Correia (5–12)	Yates (1)	26,821	47–53	
101	July 22	@ Cardinals	7–2	Odorizzi (6–8)	Wainwright (12–5)	—	43,623	48–53	
102	July 23	@ Cardinals	3–0	Cobb (6–6)	Lynn (11–7)	McGee (9)	43,564	49–53	
103	July 25	Red Sox	6–4	Price (11–7)	Tazawa (1–2)	McGee (10)	23,136	50–53	
104	July 26	Red Sox	3–0	Balfour (1–3)	Lackey (11–7)	McGee (11)	26,659	51–53	
105	July 27	Red Sox	2–3	Webster (1–0)	Archer (6–6)	Uehara (21)	25,221	51–54	
106	July 28	Brewers	2–1	Odorizzi (6–8)	Lohse (11–5)	McGee (12)	12,660	52–54	
107	July 29	Brewers	5–1	Cobb (6–6)	Smith (1–2)	—	16,249	53–54	
108	July 30	Brewers	0–5	Gallardo (6–5)	Price (11–8)	Rodríguez (31)	24,809	53–55	

August (13–16)

#	Date	Opponent	Score	Win	Loss	Save	Attendance	Record	Recap
109	August 1	Angels	3–5	Shoemaker (9–3)	Hellickson (0–1)	Street (29)	20,969	53–56	
110	August 2	Angels	10–3	Archer (7–6)	Wilson (8–7)	—	23,656	54–56	
111	August 3	Angels	5–7	Weaver (12–6)	Odorizzi (7–9)	Street (30)	25,877	54–57	
112	August 4	@ Athletics	2–3 (10)	Cook (1–1)	Balfour (1–4)	—	18,479	54–58	
113	August 5	@ Athletics	0–3	Hammel (9–9)	Smyly (6–10)	Doolittle (17)	16,335	54–59	
114	August 6	@ Athletics	7–3	Hellickson (1–1)	Gray (12–5)	—	25,513	55–59	
115	August 8	@ Cubs	5–4 (10)	Boxberger (3–1)	Rondon (3–4)	—	34,937	56–59	
116	August 9	@ Cubs	4–0	Odorizzi (8–9)	Jackson (6–12)	—	36,739	57–59	
117	August 10	@ Cubs	2–3 (12)	Villanueva (5–6)	Ramos (2–4)	—	33,039	57–60	
118	August 11	@ Rangers	7–0	Smyly (7–10)	Lewis (8–9)	—	28,501	58–60	
119	August 12	@ Rangers	2–3 (14)	Baker (1–8)	Ramos (2–5)	—	35,642	58–61	
120	August 13	@ Rangers	10–1	Archer (8–6)	Mikolas (1–5)	—	29,870	59–61	
121	August 14	@ Rangers	6–3	Odorizzi (9–9)	Ross (2–5)	McGee (13)	28,904	60–61	
122	August 15	Yankees	5–0	Cobb (8–6)	McCarthy (7–12)	—	26,535	61–61	
123	August 16	Yankees	2–3	Betances (5–0)	McGee (3–1)	Robertson (32)	31,042	61–62	
124	August 17	Yankees	2–4	Kuroda (8–8)	Hellickson (1–2)	Robertson (33)	28,812	61–63	
125	August 19	Tigers	6–8 (11)	Johnson (5–2)	Balfour (1–5)	Nathan (26)	14,331	61–64	
126	August 20	Tigers	0–6	Porcello (14–8)	Odorizzi (9–10)	—	13,575	61–65	
127	August 21	Tigers	1–0	Cobb (9–6)	Price (12–9)	McGee (14)	19,189	62–65	
128	August 22	@ Blue Jays	8–0	Smyly (8–10)	Stroman (7–5)	—	28,506	63–65	
129	August 23	@ Blue Jays	4–5 (10)	McGowan (5–3)	Peralta (2–4)	—	37,451	63–66	
130	August 24	@ Blue Jays	2–1 (10)	McGee (4–1)	Santos (0–3)	Boxberger (2)	38,869	64–66	
131	August 25	@ Orioles	1–9	Tillman (11–5)	Odorizzi (9–11)	—	15,516	64–67	
132	August 26	@ Orioles	2–4	Brach (5–0)	Balfour (1–6)	Britton (28)	16,406	64–68	
133	August 27	@ Orioles	3–1	Smyly (9–10)	Gausman (7–6)	McGee (15)	20,762	65–68	
134	August 28	@ Orioles	4–5	Miller (4–5)	Yates (0–2)	Britton (29)	16,915	65–69	
135	August 29	Red Sox	3–8	Ranaudo (3–0)	Archer (8–7)	—	16,107	65–70	
136	August 30	Red Sox	7–0	Odorizzi (10–11)	Webster (3–3)	—	17,463	66–70	
137	August 31	Red Sox	0–3	Buchholz (6–8)	Cobb (9–7)	—	16,822	66–71	

September (11–14)

#	Date	Opponent	Score	Win	Loss	Save	Attendance	Record	Recap
138	September 1	Red Sox	4–3 (10)	Balfour (2–6)	Badenhop (0–3)	—	10,543	67–71	
139	September 2	Blue Jays	2–8	Dickey (11–12)	Hellickson (1–3)	—	10,125	67–72	
140	September 3	Blue Jays	4–7	Stroman (9–5)	Archer (8–8)	Sanchez (2)	10,264	67–73	
141	September 4	Blue Jays	0–1 (10)	Cecil (2–3)	Geltz (0–1)	Janssen (21)	10,392	67–74	
142	September 5	Orioles	3–0	Boxberger (4–1)	Webb (3–3)	McGee (16)	14,632	68–74	
143	September 6	Orioles	3–2	Boxberger (5–1)	Brach (5–1)	—	17,969	69–74	
144	September 7	Orioles	5–7 (11)	Brach (6–1)	Ramos (2–6)	Miller (1)	19,914	69–75	
145	September 9	@ Yankees	4–3	Archer (9–8)	Kuroda (10–9)	McGee (17)	31,188	70–75	
146	September 10	@ Yankees	5–8	Claiborne (3–0)	Odorizzi (10–12)	—	31,591	70–76	
147	September 11	@ Yankees	4–5	Kelley (3–5)	McGee (4–2)	—	32,627	70–77	
148	September 12	@ Blue Jays	1–0	Karns (1–0)	Happ (9–10)	Balfour (12)	19,909	71–77	
149	September 13	@ Blue Jays	3–6	Dickey (13–12)	Boxberger (5–2)	Janssen (23)	31,368	71–78	
150	September 14	@ Blue Jays	6–5 (10)	McGee (5–2)	Morrow (1–3)	Beliveau (1)	28,633	72–78	
151	September 15	Yankees	1–0	Peralta (3–4)	Kelley (3–6)	—	16,058	73–78	
152	September 16	Yankees	6–1	Odorizzi (11–12)	Pineda (3–5)	—	21,387	74–78	
153	September 17	Yankees	2–3	McCarthy (10–14)	Cobb (9–8)	Robertson (37)	26,332	74–79	
154	September 19	White Sox	3–4	Quintana (9–10)	Hellickson (1–4)	Putnam (6)	17,540	74–80	
155	September 20	White Sox	3–1	Archer (10–8)	Noesí (8–11)	McGee (18)	21,830	75–80	
156	September 21	White Sox	5–10	Danks (10–11)	Karns (1–1)	—	21,270	75–81	
157	September 23	@ Red Sox	6–2	Cobb (10–8)	Buchholz (8–10)	—	35,566	76–81	
158	September 24	@ Red Sox	3–11	Ranaudo (4–3)	Odorizzi (11–13)	—	35,741	76–82	
159	September 25	@ Red Sox	1–11	Webster (5–3)	Hellickson (1–5)	—	36,590	76–83	
160	September 26	@ Indians	0–1	Kluber (18–9)	Archer (10–9)	Allen (24)	23,131	76–84	
161	September 27	@ Indians	2–0	Colomé (2–0)	Carrasco (8–7)	McGee (19)	33,025	77–84	
162	September 28	@ Indians	2–7	House (5–3)	Cobb (10–9)	—	21,400	77–85	

== Roster ==
2014 Tampa Bay Rays
Roster
Pitchers: 22 Chris Archer; 50 Grant Balfour; 40 Érik Bédard; 38 Jeff Beliveau; 13 Heath Bell; 26 Brad Boxberger; 53 Alex Cobb; 37 Alex Colomé; 54 Steve Geltz; 47 Brandon Gomes; 58 Jeremy Hellickson; 51 Nate Karns; 52 Josh Lueke; 57 Jake McGee; 55 Matt Moore; 23 Jake Odorizzi; 46 Juan Carlos Oviedo; 62 Joel Peralta; 14 David Price; 27 Cesar Ramos; 34 C. J. Riefenhauser; 33 Drew Smyly; 49 Kirby Yates	Catchers: 59 Curt Casali; 24 Ryan Hanigan; 28 José Molina; 43 Alí Solís; Infielders: 11 Yunel Escobar; 35 Cole Figueroa; 10 Logan Forsythe; 2 Nick Franklin; 21 James Loney; 3 Evan Longoria; 1 Sean Rodriguez; 18 Ben Zobrist	Outfielders: 7 David DeJesus; 5 Brandon Guyer; 8 Desmond Jennings; 20 Matthew Joyce; 39 Kevin Kiermaier; 9 Wil Myers; Other batters: 30 Vince Belnome; 19 Jerry Sands	Manager: 70 Joe Maddon; Coaches: 41 Stan Boroski (bullpen); 77 Scott Cursi (bullpen catcher); 6 Tom Foley (third base); 25 George Hendrick (first base); 48 Jim Hickey (pitching); 4 Dave Martinez (bench); 44 Jamie Nelson (assistant hitting); 17 Derek Shelton (hitting); 66 Don Zimmer (senior advisor)

== Player stats ==
Note: All batting and pitching leaders in each category are in bold.

=== Batting ===
Note: G = Games played; AB = At bats; R = Runs scored; H = Hits; 2B = Doubles; 3B = Triples; HR = Home runs; RBI = Runs batted in; AVG = Batting average; SB = Stolen bases

Player	G	AB	R	H	2B	3B	HR	RBI	AVG	SB
Vince Belnome	4	10	1	1	1	0	0	1	.100	0
Curt Casali	30	72	10	12	3	0	0	3	.167	0
David DeJesus	83	238	24	59	15	2	6	19	.248	0
Yunel Escobar	137	476	33	123	18	0	7	39	.258	1
Cole Figueroa	23	43	6	10	2	1	0	6	.233	0
Logan Forsythe	110	301	32	67	12	1	6	26	.223	2
Nick Franklin	11	34	4	7	2	0	1	4	.206	1
Brandon Guyer	97	259	37	69	15	1	3	26	.266	6
Ryan Hanigan	84	225	18	49	9	0	5	34	.218	1
Desmond Jennings	123	479	64	117	30	2	10	36	.244	**15**
Matt Joyce	140	418	51	106	23	2	9	52	.254	2
Kevin Kiermaier	108	331	35	87	16	**8**	10	35	.263	5
James Loney	155	600	59	**174**	27	0	9	69	**.290**	4
Evan Longoria	**162**	**624**	**83**	158	26	1	**22**	**91**	.253	5
José Molina	80	225	4	40	2	0	0	10	.178	3
Wil Myers	87	325	37	72	14	0	6	35	.222	6
Sean Rodriguez	96	237	30	50	13	3	12	41	.211	2
Jerry Sands	12	21	1	4	0	0	1	4	.190	0
Alí Solís	8	6	0	0	0	0	0	1	.000	0
Ben Zobrist	146	570	**83**	155	**34**	3	10	52	.272	10
Pitcher Totals	162	22	0	1	1	0	0	2	.045	0
**Team totals**	**162**	**5516**	**612**	**1361**	**263**	**24**	**117**	**586**	**.247**	**63**

=== Pitching ===
Note: W = Wins; L = Losses; ERA = Earned run average; G = Games pitched; GS = Games started; SV = Saves; IP = Innings pitched; H = Hits allowed; R = Runs allowed; ER = Earned runs allowed; BB = Walks allowed; K = Strikeouts

Player	W	L	ERA	G	GS	SV	IP	H	R	ER	BB	K
Chris Archer	10	9	3.33	32	**32**	0	**194.2**	**177**	**85**	72	**72**	173
Grant Balfour	2	6	4.91	65	0	12	62.1	49	34	34	41	57
Érik Bédard	4	6	4.76	17	15	0	75.2	84	46	40	29	64
Jeff Beliveau	0	0	2.63	30	0	1	24.0	19	7	7	7	28
Heath Bell	1	1	7.27	13	0	0	17.1	24	16	14	8	12
Brad Boxberger	5	2	2.37	63	0	2	64.2	34	17	17	20	104
Alex Cobb	10	9	**2.87**	27	27	0	166.1	142	56	53	47	149
Alex Colomé	2	0	2.66	5	3	0	23.2	19	7	7	10	13
Steve Geltz	0	1	3.24	11	0	0	8.1	6	3	3	5	14
Brandon Gomes	2	2	3.71	29	0	0	34.0	28	14	14	11	24
Jeremy Hellickson	1	5	4.52	13	13	0	63.2	71	35	32	21	54
Nate Karns	1	1	4.50	2	2	0	12.0	7	6	6	4	13
Josh Lueke	1	2	5.64	25	0	0	30.1	38	20	19	5	19
Jake McGee	5	2	1.89	**73**	0	**19**	71.1	48	15	15	16	90
Matt Moore	0	2	2.70	2	2	0	10.0	10	3	3	5	6
Jake Odorizzi	**11**	**13**	4.13	31	31	0	168.0	156	79	**77**	59	174
Juan Carlos Oviedo	3	3	3.69	32	0	1	31.2	27	14	13	16	26
Joel Peralta	3	4	4.41	69	0	1	63.1	60	31	31	15	74
David Price	**11**	8	3.11	23	23	0	170.2	156	68	59	23	**189**
Cesar Ramos	2	6	3.70	43	7	0	82.2	73	39	34	39	66
C.J. Riefenhauser	0	0	8.44	7	0	0	5.1	6	5	5	3	2
Drew Smyly	3	1	1.70	7	7	0	47.2	25	9	9	11	44
Kirby Yates	0	2	3.75	37	0	1	36.0	33	16	15	15	42
**Team totals**	**77**	**85**	**3.56**	**162**	**162**	**37**	**1463.2**	**1292**	**625**	**579**	**482**	**1437**

== Farm system ==
Level	Team	League	Manager
AAA	Durham Bulls	International League	Charlie Montoyo
AA	Montgomery Biscuits	Southern League	Brady Williams
A	Charlotte Stone Crabs	Florida State League	Jared Sandberg
A	Bowling Green Hot Rods	Midwest League	Mike Johns
A-Short Season	Hudson Valley Renegades	New York–Penn League	Tim Parenton
Rookie	Princeton Rays	Appalachian League	Danny Sheaffer
Rookie	GCL Rays	Gulf Coast League	Jim Morrison
