= 2014 Kansas City Royals season =

2014 Kansas City Royals
- American League champions American League Wild Card winners
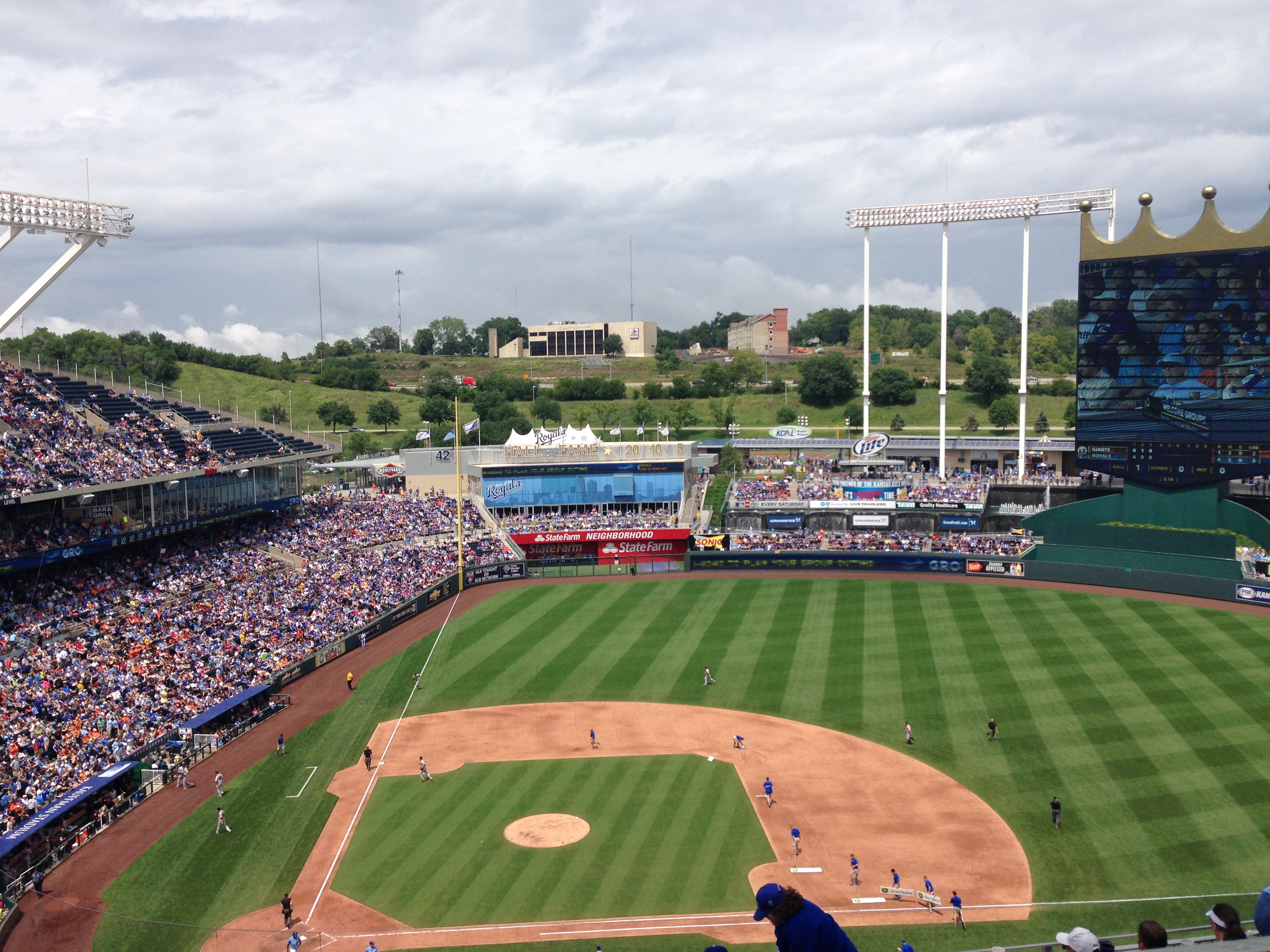
- Royals home game vs. Giants on August 10, 2014. Two months later the Giants would be their World Series opponent.
- League: American League
- Division: Central
- Ballpark: Kauffman Stadium
- City: Kansas City, Missouri
- Record: 89–73 (.549)
- Divisional place: 2nd
- Owners: David Glass
- General managers: Dayton Moore
- Managers: Ned Yost
- Television: Fox Sports Kansas City (Ryan Lefebvre, Jeff Montgomery, Rex Hudler, Steve Physioc)
- Radio: KCSP 610 AM (Denny Matthews, Steve Stewart, Ryan Lefebvre, Steve Physioc)

The Kansas City Royals' season of 2014 was the 46th for the Royals franchise. On September 26, 2014, the Royals clinched a playoff berth for the first time since 1985. They began the post-season by defeating the Oakland Athletics in the ALWC Game and sweeping both the Los Angeles Angels of Anaheim in the ALDS and the Baltimore Orioles in the ALCS, becoming the first team in Major League history to win their first 8 postseason games in a row. They lost to the San Francisco Giants in seven games in the 2014 World Series.

To date, the 2014 Royals are the most recent MLB team to hit fewer than 100 home runs in a season.

== Regular season ==
=== 4-run trend ===
After the first 29 games of the 2014 regular season, the Royals had a record of 14–15. In all of their 14 wins, the Royals had scored at least 4 runs. In all of their 15 losses, the Royals had scored 3 runs or less. In the 30th game of the regular season, the Royals were playing the Tigers at home and the Tigers were winning 9–3 going into the bottom of the ninth inning. Mike Moustakas walked to lead off the bottom half of the inning, Alcides Escobar struck out, and Jarrod Dyson grounded out, but advanced Moustakas to second. With two outs and a runner on second in the bottom of the ninth inning, with his team down 6 runs, Nori Aoki hit a single to center field that would score Moustakas, making the score 9–4 Tigers. After Omar Infante singled and advanced Aoki to second, Eric Hosmer recorded the final out of the game with his team at 4 runs by popping out to the catcher, becoming the first Royal in the 2014 regular season to hit into the final out with the Royals at 4 runs or more. The Royals would then become 14–1 when scoring at least 4 runs. After 30 games, however, the trend of always losing when scoring 3 or less was still in place, with the Royals being 0–15 in these games. Finally, on the 32nd game of the regular season, the Royals had a record of 14–17 heading into the game. They beat the Padres in San Diego 3–1 in 11 innings to end the winless streak of games where they scored 3 runs or less.

=== 10-game winning streak ===
The Royals went on a 10-game winning streak in June, beating the Yankees twice at home, the Indians twice at home, the White Sox three times on the road, and the Tigers three times on the road. At the end of the streak, the Royals were in first place in the AL Central. This was the first time since 2003 that they were leading their division that late in the season.

=== Midseason slump ===
From June 1–18, the Royals posted a 13–3 record with one rainout, followed by a 9–17 record from June 19 to July 20. The last three games of this slump, which immediately followed the All-Star break, was a three-game sweep by the Boston Red Sox. After the July 20 game, first base coach Rusty Kuntz entered the team's clubhouse and found many of the players intently playing the computer game Clash of Clans on their smart phones. The team lost a fourth game to the Chicago White Sox on July 21. Before the July 22 game Raúl Ibañez, who joined the team only three weeks earlier after being released by the Los Angeles Angels, called a players-only team meeting to discuss the priorities of the team. After that meeting, the team went 25–9 between then and August 27.

=== Postseason clinch ===
On Friday, September 26, 2014, the Royals won a game in Chicago against the White Sox 3–1, which would clinch a postseason berth for the Royals for the first time since 1985.

== Season standings ==
=== American League Central ===
AL Central
Team	W	L	Pct.	GB	Home	Road
Detroit Tigers	90	72	.556	—	45‍–‍36	45‍–‍36
Kansas City Royals	89	73	.549	1	42‍–‍39	47‍–‍34
Cleveland Indians	85	77	.525	5	48‍–‍33	37‍–‍44
Chicago White Sox	73	89	.451	17	40‍–‍41	33‍–‍48
Minnesota Twins	70	92	.432	20	35‍–‍46	35‍–‍46

=== American League Wild Card ===
Division leaders
Team	W	L	Pct.
Los Angeles Angels	98	64	.605
Baltimore Orioles	96	66	.593
Detroit Tigers	90	72	.556

Wild Card teams (Top 2 teams qualify for postseason)
Team	W	L	Pct.	GB
Kansas City Royals	89	73	.549	+1
Oakland Athletics	88	74	.543	—
Seattle Mariners	87	75	.537	1
Cleveland Indians	85	77	.525	3
New York Yankees	84	78	.519	4
Toronto Blue Jays	83	79	.512	5
Tampa Bay Rays	77	85	.475	11
Chicago White Sox	73	89	.451	15
Boston Red Sox	71	91	.438	17
Houston Astros	70	92	.432	18
Minnesota Twins	70	92	.432	18
Texas Rangers	67	95	.414	21

=== Record vs. opponents ===
2014 American League record Source: MLB Standings Grid – 2014
Team	BAL	BOS	CWS	CLE	DET	HOU	KC	LAA	MIN	NYY	OAK	SEA	TB	TEX	TOR	NL
Baltimore	—	11–8	5–1	3–4	1–5	4–3	3–4	4–2	4–3	13–6	2–4	5–2	12–7	6–1	11–8	12–8
Boston	8–11	—	4–3	2–5	1–5	4–3	6–1	2–5	4–2	7–12	3–4	1–5	9–10	4–2	7–12	9–11
Chicago	1–5	3–4	—	9–10	9–10	3–3	6–13	1–5	9–10	2–5	4–3	3–4	5–2	2–4	5–2	11–9
Cleveland	4–3	5–2	10–9	—	8–11	5–2	10–9	2–5	11–8	4–3	2–4	2–4	4–2	6–1	2–4	10–10
Detroit	5–1	5–1	10–9	11–8	—	4–3	13–6	3–4	9–10	3–4	5–2	2–4	3–4	4–3	1–5	12–8
Houston	3–4	3–4	3–3	2–5	3–4	—	3–3	7–12	3–3	4–2	8–11	9–10	2–5	11–8	4–3	5–15
Kansas City	4–3	1–6	13–6	9–10	6–13	3–3	—	3–3	11–8	4–3	5–2	2–5	4–2	5–1	4–3	15–5
Los Angeles	2–4	5–2	5–1	5–2	4–3	12–7	3–3	—	7–0	2–4	10–9	7–12	5–2	14–5	5–2	12–8
Minnesota	3–4	2–4	10–9	8–11	10–9	3–3	8–11	0–7	—	3–4	1–6	5–2	2–4	2–5	4–2	9–11
New York	6–13	12–7	5–2	3–4	4–3	2–4	3–4	4–2	4–3	—	2–4	3–3	8–11	4–3	11–8	13–7
Oakland	4–2	4–3	3–4	4–2	2–5	11–8	2–5	9–10	6–1	4–2	—	9–10	4–2	9–10	4–3	13–7
Seattle	2–5	5–1	4–3	4–2	4–2	10–9	5–2	12–7	2–5	3–3	10–9	—	4–3	9–10	4–3	9–11
Tampa Bay	7–12	10–9	2–5	2–4	4–3	5–2	2–4	2–5	4–2	11–8	2–4	3–4	—	5–2	8–11	10–10
Texas	1–6	2–4	4–2	1–6	3–4	8–11	1–5	5–14	5–2	3–4	10–9	10–9	2–5	—	2–4	10–10
Toronto	8–11	12–7	2–5	4–2	5–1	3–4	3–4	2–5	2–4	8–11	3–4	3–4	11–8	4–2	—	13–7

=== Detailed records ===
(updated through September 28)

American League
Opponent	Home	Away	Total	Pct.	Runs scored	Runs allowed
AL East
Toronto Blue Jays	2–1	2–2	4–3	.571	33	39
New York Yankees	2–2	2–1	4–3	.571	18	23
Baltimore Orioles	2–2	2–1	4–3	.571	26	18
Boston Red Sox	1–3	0–3	1–6	.143	17	32
Tampa Bay Rays	2–1	2–1	4–2	.667	25	14
	8–6	8–8	16–14	.519	119	126
AL Central
Kansas City Royals	-	-	-	-	-	-
Detroit Tigers	2–8	4–5	6–13	.316	66	100
Chicago White Sox	5–4	8–2	13–6	.684	93	64
Minnesota Twins	6–3	5–5	11–8	.579	78	83
Cleveland Indians	5–4	4–6	9–10	.474	76	74
	18–19	21–18	39–37	.513	313	321
AL West
Oakland Athletics	3–1	2–1	5–2	.714	24	26
Los Angeles Angels	2–1	1–2	3–3	.500	26	30
Texas Rangers	3–0	2–1	5–1	.833	23	14
Seattle Mariners	0–3	2–2	2–5	.286	23	23
Houston Astros	0–3	3–0	3–3	.500	20	28
	8–8	10–6	18–14	.563	116	121

National League
Opponent	Home	Away	Total	Pct.	Runs scored	Runs allowed
San Diego Padres	0–0	2–1	2–1	.667	16	7
Colorado Rockies	2–0	1–1	3–1	.750	17	12
St. Louis Cardinals	1–1	2–0	3–1	.750	19	14
Los Angeles Dodgers	1–2	0–0	1–2	.333	9	10
Arizona Diamondbacks	0–0	3–0	3–0	1.000	22	7
San Francisco Giants	3–0	0–0	3–0	1.000	16	6
	7–3	8–2	15–5	.750	99	56

== Game log ==
Legend
Royals Win	Royals Loss	Game postponed

2014 Kansas City Royals Game Log
March/April (14–12)

#	Date	Opponent	Score	Win	Loss	Save	Attendance	Record
1	March 31	@ Tigers	3–4	Nathan (1–0)	Davis (0–1)	—	45,068	0–1
2	April 2	@ Tigers	1–2 (10)	Alburquerque (1–0)	Collins (0–1)	—	26,906	0–2
--	April 3	@ Tigers		Postponed (rain). Rescheduled to June 19.				
3	April 4	White Sox	7–5	Guthrie (1–0)	Johnson (0–1)	Holland (1)	40,103	1–2
4	April 5	White Sox	4–3	Davis (1–1)	Downs (0–1)	Holland (2)	21,463	2–2
5	April 6	White Sox	1–5	Sale (2–0)	Shields (0–1)		29,760	2–3
6	April 7	Rays	4–2	Vargas (1–0)	Moore (0–2)	Holland (3)	12,087	3–3
7	April 8	Rays	0–1	Peralta (1–1)	Holland (0–1)	Balfour (2)	13,905	3–4
8	April 9	Rays	7–3	Guthrie (2–0)	Odorizzi (1–1)		13,612	4–4
9	April 11	@ Twins	1–10	Gibson (2–0)	Chen (0–1)		24,338	4–5
10	April 12	@ Twins	1–7	Nolasco (1–1)	Shields (0–2)		23,963	4–6
11	April 13	@ Twins	3–4	Fien (1–0)	Crow (0–1)	Perkins (3)	20,878	4–7
12	April 15	@ Astros	4–2	Ventura (1–0)	Harrell (0–3)	Holland (4)	29,778	5–7
13	April 16	@ Astros	6–4 (11)	Duffy (1–0)	Williams (0–1)	Holland (5)	23,043	6–7
14	April 17	@ Astros	5–1	Shields (1–2)	Feldman (2–1)		26,333	7–7
15	April 18	Twins	5–0	Vargas (2–0)	Nolasco (1–2)		21,192	8–7
16	April 19	Twins	5–4	Chen (1–1)	Correia (0–2)	Holland (6)	24,291	9–7
17	April 20	Twins	3–8	Hughes (1–1)	Ventura (1–1)		17,710	9–8
18	April 21	@ Indians	3–4	McAllister (3–0)	Guthrie (2–1)	Axford (7)	10,789	9–9
19	April 22	@ Indians	8–2	Shields (2–2)	Salazar (0–3)		8,848	10–9
20	April 23	@ Indians	3–5	Shaw (1–0)	Herrera (0–1)	Axford (8)	9,311	10–10
21	April 24	@ Indians	1–5	Kluber (2–2)	Chen (1–2)		10,440	10–11
22	April 25	@ Orioles	5–0	Ventura (2–1)	Jiménez (0–4)		22,478	11–11
23	April 26	@ Orioles	2–3 (10)	Britton (3–0)	Duffy (1–1)		34,941	11–12
24	April 27	@ Orioles	9–3	Shields (3–2)	González (1–2)		38,368	12–12
25	April 29	Blue Jays	10–7	Crow (1–1)	Cecil (0–2)		10,705	13–12
26	April 30	Blue Jays	4–2	Herrera (1–1)	Hutchison (1–2)	Holland (7)	11,715	14–12

May (12–17)

#	Date	Opponent	Score	Win	Loss	Save	Attendance	Record
27	May 1	Blue Jays	3–7	Buehrle (5–1)	Guthrie (2–2)	Loup (1)	11,207	14–13
28	May 2	Tigers	2–8	Porcello (4–1)	Shields (3–3)		28,021	14–14
29	May 3	Tigers	2–9	Smyly (2–1)	Duffy (1–2)		29,200	14–15
30	May 4	Tigers	4–9	Verlander (4–1)	Vargas (2–1)		22,504	14–16
31	May 5	@ Padres	5–6 (12)	Stauffer (1–0)	Collins (0–2)		14,089	14–17
32	May 6	@ Padres	3–1 (11)	Davis (2–1)	Vincent (0–1)	Holland (8)	16,542	15–17
33	May 7	@ Padres	8–0	Shields (4–3)	Cashner (2–5)		18,228	16–17
34	May 8	@ Mariners	0–1	Iwakuma (2–0)	Duffy (1–3)	Rodney (10)	12,577	16–18
35	May 9	@ Mariners	6–1	Vargas (3–1)	Maurer (1–1)		20,858	17–18
36	May 10	@ Mariners	1–3	Young (3–0)	Ventura (2–2)	Rodney (11)	29,359	17–19
37	May 11	@ Mariners	9–7	Coleman (1–0)	Farquhar (1–1)	Holland (9)	30,447	18–19
38	May 13	Rockies	5–1	Shields (5–3)	Morales (3–3)		15,914	19–19
39	May 14	Rockies	3–2	Vargas (4–1)	Chacín (0–2)	Holland (10)	27,323	20–19
40	May 15	Orioles	1–2	Chen (5–2)	Ventura (2–3)	Britton (1)	12,455	20–20
41	May 16	Orioles	0–4	Tillman (4–2)	Guthrie (2–3)		25,985	20–21
42	May 17	Orioles	1–0	Duffy (2–3)	Norris (2–4)	Holland (11)	24,064	21–21
43	May 18	Orioles	8–6	Shields (6–3)	Jiménez (2–5)	Holland (12)	22,692	22–21
44	May 19	White Sox	6–7	Putnam (2–0)	Vargas (4–2)	Petricka (1)	16,462	22–22
45	May 20	White Sox	6–7	Rienzo (4–0)	Ventura (2–4)	Belisario (1)	14,900	22–23
46	May 21	White Sox	3–1	Davis (3–1)	Quintana (2–4)	Holland (13)	17,576	23–23
47	May 23	@ Angels	1–6	Wilson (6–3)	Duffy (2–4)		35,082	23–24
48	May 24	@ Angels	7–4 (13)	Crow (2–1)	Morin (0–1)	Holland (14)	42,140	24–24
49	May 25	@ Angels	3–4	Kohn (2–1)	Collins (0–3)	Frieri (6)	36,114	24–25
50	May 26	Astros	2–9	Feldman (3–2)	Ventura (2–5)		32,070	24–26
51	May 27	Astros	0–3	McHugh (3–3)	Guthrie (2–4)		17,826	24–27
52	May 28	Astros	3–9	Cosart (4–4)	Duffy (2–5)		16,220	24–28
53	May 29	@ Blue Jays	8–6 (10)	Davis (4–1)	Redmond (0–4)		17,978	25–28
54	May 30	@ Blue Jays	6–1	Vargas (5–2)	Happ (4–2)		21,543	26–28
55	May 31	@ Blue Jays	2–12	Stroman (2–0)	Brooks (0–1)	Redmond (1)	31,652	26–29

June (17–10)

#	Date	Opponent	Score	Win	Loss	Save	Attendance	Record
56	June 1	@ Blue Jays	0–4	Buehrle (10–1)	Guthrie (2–5)		38,008	26–30
57	June 2	@ Cardinals	6–0	Duffy (3–5)	Miller (6–5)		41,239	27–30
58	June 3	@ Cardinals	8–7	Davis (5–1)	Rosenthal (0–3)	Holland (16)	41,192	28–30
59	June 4	Cardinals	2–5 (11)	Freeman (1–0)	Herrera (1–2)	Neshek (1)	22,126	28–31
60	June 5	Cardinals	3–2	Ventura (3–5)	Wacha (4–4)	Holland (17)	24,438	29–31
61	June 6	Yankees	2–4	Whitley (1–0)	Guthrie (2–6)	Robertson (14)	23,418	29–32
62	June 7	Yankees	8–6	Crow (3–1)	Phelps (1–4)		26,991	30–32
63	June 8	Yankees	2–1	Shields (7–3)	Kuroda (4–4)	Holland (18)	24,614	31–32
–	June 9	Yankees	Postponed (rain). Rescheduled to August 25.					
64	June 10	Indians	9–5	Vargas (6–2)	Kluber (6–2)	Crow (1)	25,540	32–32
65	June 11	Indians	4–1	Ventura (4–5)	Bauer (1–3)	Holland (19)	19,938	33–32
66	June 13	@ White Sox	7–2	Guthrie (3–6)	Quintana (3–7)		22,773	34–32
67	June 14	@ White Sox	9–1	Duffy (4–5)	Noesí (2–5)		24,527	35–32
68	June 15	@ White Sox	6–3	Shields (8–3)	Rienzo (4–4)	Holland (20)	29,152	36–32
69	June 16	@ Tigers	11–8	Vargas (7–2)	Verlander (6–7)		31,774	37–32
70	June 17	@ Tigers	11–4	Ventura (5–5)	Scherzer (8–3)		34,328	38–32
71	June 18	@ Tigers	2–1	Guthrie (4–6)	Smyly (3–6)	Holland (21)	37,209	39–32
72	June 19	@ Tigers	1–2	Sánchez (4–2)	Duffy (4–6)	Nathan (14)	35,715	39–33
73	June 20	Mariners	5–7	Furbush (1–4)	Holland (0–2)	Rodney (19)	38,475	39–34
74	June 21	Mariners	1–2	Medina (4–1)	Vargas (7–3)	Rodney (20)	21,640	39–35
75	June 22	Mariners	1–2	Elías (7–5)	Ventura (5–6)	Rodney (21)	23,278	39–36
76	June 23	Dodgers	5–3	Guthrie (5–6)	Greinke (9–4)	Holland (22)	21,615	40–36
77	June 24	Dodgers	0–2	Kershaw (8–2)	Duffy (4–7)	Jansen (23)	28,302	40–37
78	June 25	Dodgers	4–5	Wright (3–2)	Davis (5–2)	Wilson (1)	19,776	40–38
79	June 27	Angels	8–6	Mariot (1–0)	Shoemaker (5–2)	Holland (23)	35,461	41–38
80	June 28	Angels	2–6	Morin (2–1)	Ventura (5–7)		21,093	41–39
81	June 29	Angels	5–4	Holland (1–2)	Grilli (0–3)		27,803	42–39
82	June 30	@ Twins	6–1	Duffy (5–7)	Pino (0–2)		28,533	43–39

July (12–13)

#	Date	Opponent	Score	Win	Loss	Save	Attendance	Record
83	July 1	@ Twins	2–10	Nolasco (5–6)	Shields (8–4)		23,383	43–40
84	July 2	@ Twins	4–0	Vargas (8–3)	Correia (4–10)		28,860	44–40
85	July 4	@ Indians	7–1	Ventura (6–7)	Tomlin (5–6)		39,020	45–40
86	July 5	@ Indians	3–7	House (1–2)	Guthrie (5–7)		24,481	45–41
87	July 6	@ Indians	1–4	Kluber (8–6)	Duffy (5–8)	Allen (9)	16,991	45–42
88	July 7	@ Rays	6–0	Shields (9–4)	Odorizzi (4–8)		13,406	46–42
89	July 8	@ Rays	3–4	Boxberger (2–1)	Vargas (8–4)	McGee (6)	12,818	46–43
90	July 9	@ Rays	5–4	Crow (4–1)	Yates (0–1)		12,150	47–43
91	July 10	Tigers	4–16	Smyly (5–8)	Guthrie (5–8)		21,775	47–44
92	July 11	Tigers	1–2	Sánchez (6–3)	Duffy (5–9)	Nathan (19)	31,581	47–45
93	July 12	Tigers	1–5	Porcello (12–5)	Shields (9–5)		33,849	47–46
94	July 13	Tigers	5–2	Ventura (7–7)	Verlander (8–8)	Holland (25)	23,424	48–46
95	July 18	@ Red Sox	4–5	Buchholz (5–5)	Downs (0–3)	Uehara (19)	37,743	48–47
96	July 19	@ Red Sox	1–2	De La Rosa (3–2)	Duffy (5–10)	Uehara (20)	37,878	48–48
97	July 20	@ Red Sox	0–6	Lester (10–7)	Ventura (6–7)		37,439	48–49
98	July 21	@ White Sox	1–3	Sale (9–1)	Guthrie (5–9)	Petricka (4)	18,888	48–50
99	July 22	@ White Sox	7–1	Chen (2–2)	Carroll (4–6)		20,428	49–50
100	July 23	@ White Sox	2–1	Wade (6–2)	Putnam (3–2)	Holland (26)	23,811	50–50
101	July 24	Indians	2–1 (14)	Crow (5–1)	Rzepczynski (0–3)		22,120	51–50
102	July 25	Indians	6–4	Herrera (2–2)	Carrasco (3–4)	Crow (2)	33,460	52–50
103	July 26	Indians	7–5	Guthrie (6–9)	McAllister (3–6)	Holland (27)	29,567	53–50
104	July 27	Indians	3–10	Salazar (3–4)	Chen (2–3)		23,409	53–51
105	July 29	Twins	1–2	Gibson (9–8)	Shields (9–6)	Perkins (26)	30,686	53–52
106	July 30	Twins	3–2	Frasor (2–1)	Hughes (10–8)	Holland (28)	20,747	54–52
107	July 31	Twins	6–3	Ventura (8–8)	Thielbar (2–1)	Holland (29)	24,127	55–52

August (19–10)

#	Date	Opponent	Score	Win	Loss	Save	Attendance	Record
108	August 1	@ Athletics	1–0	Guthrie (7–9)	Gray (12–4)	Holland (30)	35,067	56–52
109	August 2	@ Athletics	3–8	Lester (11–7)	Vargas (8–5)		30,097	56–53
110	August 3	@ Athletics	4–2	Shields (10–6)	Kazmir (12–4)	Holland (31)	22,612	57–53
111	August 5	@ Diamondbacks	12–2	Duffy (6–10)	Miley (7–8)		16,677	58–53
112	August 6	@ Diamondbacks	4–3	Ventura (9–8)	Collmenter (8–6)	Holland (32)	16,157	59–53
113	August 7	@ Diamondbacks	6–2	Guthrie (8–9)	Nuño (2–8)		17,809	60–53
114	August 8	Giants	4–2	Frasor (3–1)	Bumgarner (13–9)	Holland (33)	28,307	61–53
115	August 9	Giants	5–0	Shields (11–6)	Hudson (8–9)		35,114	62–53
116	August 10	Giants	7–4	Duffy (7–10)	Lincecum (9–8)	Holland (34)	27,359	63–53
117	August 11	Athletics	3–2	Herrera (3–2)	Gray (12–6)	Holland (35)	21,479	64–53
118	August 12	Athletics	3–11	Lester (3–0)	Guthrie (8–10)		27,161	64–54
119	August 13	Athletics	3–0	Vargas (9–5)	Kazmir (13–5)		21,099	65–54
120	August 14	Athletics	7–3	Crow (6–1)	Samardzija (3–2)	Holland (36)	20,569	66–54
121	August 15	@ Twins	6–5	Duffy (8–10)	Nolasco (5–8)	Holland (37)	32,013	67–54
122	August 16	@ Twins	1–4	Hughes (13–8)	Ventura (9–9)	Perkins (31)	35,575	67–55
123	August 17	@ Twins	12–6	Guthrie (9–10)	Milone (6–4)		31,455	68–55
124	August 18	@ Twins	6–4	Vargas (10–5)	May (0–2)	Holland (38)	25,559	69–55
125	August 19	@ Rockies	7–4	Shields (12–6)	Matzek (2–9)	Holland (39)	30,394	70–55
126	August 20	@ Rockies	2–5	De la Rosa (13–8)	Duffy (8–11)	Hawkins (19)	28,834	70–56
127	August 22	@ Rangers	6–3	Ventura (10–9)	Lewis (8–11)	Holland (40)	26,991	71–56
128	August 23	@ Rangers	6–3	Guthrie (10–10)	Tepesch (4–8)		27,400	72–56
129	August 24	@ Rangers	1–3	Baker (2–3)	Vargas (10–6)	Feliz (6)	30,049	72–57
130	August 25	Yankees	1–8	Pineda (3–2)	Shields (12–7)		31,758	72–58
131	August 26	Twins	2–1	Davis (7–2)	Perkins (3–1)		13,847	73–58
132	August 27	Twins	6–1	Davis (8–2)	Hughes (14–9)		17,668	74–58
133	August 28	Twins	5–11 (10)	Swarzak (3–1)	Chen (2–4)		17,219	74–59
134	August 29	Indians	1–6	Salazar (5–6)	Vargas (10–7)		31,341	74–60
135	August 30	Indians	2–3 (11)	Tomlin (6–8)	Downs (0–4)		35,089	74–61
136	August 31*	Indians	3–4 (10)	Allen (6–4)	Holland (1–3)		39,009	74–62
—	*Game suspended by rain at 2–4 in the bottom of the 10th inning, completed on September 22 at Progressive Field.							

September (15–11)

#	Date	Opponent	Score	Win	Loss	Save	Attendance	Record
137	September 1	Rangers	4–3	Ventura (11–9)	Lewis (9–12)	Holland (41)	21,536	75–62
138	September 2	Rangers	2–1	Frasor (4–1)	Kirkman (4–1)	Crow (3)	19,435	76–62
139	September 3	Rangers	4–1	Vargas (11–7)	Tepesch (4–9)	Holland (42)	15,771	77–62
140	September 5	@ Yankees	1–0	Shields (13–7)	Pineda (3–4)	Davis (1)	36,284	78–62
141	September 6	@ Yankees	2–6	McCarthy (9–14)	Hendriks (1–1)		45,262	78–63
142	September 7	@ Yankees	2–0	Ventura (12–9)	Greene (4–3)	Davis (2)	48,110	79–63
143	September 8	@ Tigers	5–9	Verlander (13–12)	Guthrie (10–11)		30,758	79–64
144	September 9	@ Tigers	2–4	Scherzer (16–5)	Vargas (11–8)	Nathan (30)	32,603	79–65
145	September 10	@ Tigers	3–0	Shields (14–7)	Porcello (15–11)	Davis (3)	29,751	80–65
146	September 11	Red Sox	3–6	Buchholz (8–8)	Hendriks (1–2)	Mujica (5)	28,673	80–66
147	September 12	Red Sox	2–4	Webster (4–3)	Ventura (12–10)	Mujica (6)	19,191	80–67
148	September 13	Red Sox	7–1	Guthrie (11–11)	De La Rosa (4–7)		26,627	81–67
149	September 14	Red Sox	4–8	Kelly (4–4)	Vargas (11–9)		19,065	81–68
150	September 15	White Sox	4–3	Davis (9–2)	Petricka (1–5)		21,390	82–68
151	September 16	White Sox	5–7	Herrera (3–3)	Surkamp (2–0)		28,904	82–69
152	September 17	White Sox	6–2	Ventura (13–10)	Sale (12–4)		26,425	83–69
153	September 19	Tigers	1–10	Verlander (14–12)	Vargas (11–10)		37,945	83–70
154	September 20	Tigers	2–3	Scherzer (17–5)	Shields (14–8)	Nathan (33)	37,074	83–71
155	September 21	Tigers	5–2	Guthrie (12–11)	Porcello (15–12)	Holland (43)	37,212	84–71
156	September 22	@ Indians	2–0	Duffy (9–11)	Carrasco (8–6)	Holland (44)	10,458	85–71
157	September 23	@ Indians	7–1	Ventura (14–10)	Salazar (6–8)		11,735	86–71
158	September 24	@ Indians	4–6	McAllister (4–7)	Finnegan (0–1)	Allen (23)	13,796	86–72
159	September 25	@ White Sox	6–3	Herrera (4–3)	Quintana (9–11)	Holland (45)	19,587	87–72
160	September 26	@ White Sox	3–1	Guthrie (13–11)	Noesí (8–12)	Holland (46)	27,416	88–72
161	September 27	@ White Sox	4–5	Danks (11–11)	Duffy (9–12)	Guerra (1)	38,160	88–73
162	September 28	@ White Sox	6–4	Coleman (1–0)	Webb (6–5)	Coleman (1)	32,266	89–73

== Roster ==
2014 Kansas City Royals
Roster
Pitchers: 62 Aaron Brooks; 67 Francisley Bueno; 52 Bruce Chen; 25 Casey Coleman; 31 Louis Coleman; 55 Tim Collins; 43 Aaron Crow; 17 Wade Davis; 37 Scott Downs; 41 Danny Duffy; 27 Brandon Finnegan; 54 Jason Frasor; 11 Jeremy Guthrie; 39 Liam Hendriks; 40 Kelvin Herrera; 56 Greg Holland; 49 Donnie Joseph; 48 Michael Mariot; 46 Justin Marks; 68 Wilking Rodríguez; 33 James Shields; 51 Jason Vargas; 30 Yordano Ventura	Catchers: 12 Brett Hayes; 19 Erik Kratz; 26 Francisco Peña; 13 Salvador Pérez; Infielders: 16 Billy Butler; 37 Pedro Ciriaco; 24 Christian Colón; 2 Alcides Escobar; 9 Johnny Giavotella; 35 Eric Hosmer; 14 Omar Infante; 8 Mike Moustakas; 12 Jayson Nix; 32 Jimmy Paredes; 19 Danny Valencia	Outfielders: 45 Lane Adams; 23 Nori Aoki; 6 Lorenzo Cain; 1 Jarrod Dyson; 4 Alex Gordon; 0 Terrance Gore; 18 Raúl Ibañez; 27 Justin Maxwell; 34 Carlos Peguero; 7 Josh Willingham	Manager: 3 Ned Yost; Coaches: 58 Dave Eiland (pitching); 28 Pedro Grifol (catching instructor); 57 Doug Henry (bullpen); 59 Mike Jirschele (third base); 15 Rusty Kuntz (first base); 21 Dale Sveum (hitting); 22 Don Wakamatsu (bench)

== Player stats ==
=== Batting ===
Note: G = Games played; AB = At bats; R = Runs; H = Hits; 2B = Doubles; 3B = Triples; HR = Home runs; RBI = Runs batted in; SB = Stolen bases; BB = Walks; AVG = Batting average; SLG = Slugging average

Player	G	AB	R	H	2B	3B	HR	RBI	SB	BB	AVG	SLG
Alcides Escobar	162	579	74	165	34	5	3	50	31	23	.285	.377
Salvador Pérez	150	578	57	150	28	2	17	70	1	22	.260	.403
Alex Gordon	156	563	87	150	34	1	19	74	12	65	.266	.432
Billy Butler	151	549	57	149	32	0	9	66	0	41	.271	.379
Omar Infante	135	528	50	133	21	3	6	66	9	33	.252	.337
Eric Hosmer	131	503	54	136	35	1	9	58	4	35	.270	.398
Nori Aoki	132	491	63	140	22	6	1	43	17	43	.285	.360
Lorenzo Cain	133	471	55	142	29	4	5	53	28	24	.301	.412
Mike Moustakas	140	457	45	97	21	1	15	54	1	35	.212	.361
Jarrod Dyson	120	260	33	70	4	4	1	24	36	22	.269	.327
Danny Valencia	36	110	8	31	5	0	2	11	0	7	.282	.382
Raúl Ibañez	33	80	7	15	3	1	2	5	0	10	.188	.325
Josh Willingham	24	73	14	17	5	0	2	6	1	11	.233	.384
Brett Hayes	27	52	3	7	1	0	1	2	0	1	.135	.212
Pedro Ciriaco	25	47	7	10	2	0	0	2	4	0	.213	.255
Christian Colón	21	45	8	15	5	1	0	6	2	3	.333	.489
Justin Maxwell	20	40	4	6	1	0	0	3	0	2	.150	.175
Johnny Giavotella	12	37	8	8	1	0	1	5	0	1	.216	.324
Erik Kratz	13	29	4	8	1	0	2	3	0	1	.276	.517
Jimmy Paredes	9	10	3	2	0	0	0	0	2	0	.200	.200
Carlos Peguero	4	9	1	2	1	0	0	1	0	1	.222	.333
Jayson Nix	7	8	0	0	0	0	0	1	0	0	.000	.000
Lane Adams	6	3	1	0	0	0	0	0	0	0	.000	.000
Terrance Gore	11	1	5	0	0	0	0	0	5	0	.000	.000
Francisco Peña	1	0	0	0	0	0	0	0	0	0	.---	.---
Pitcher totals	162	22	3	3	1	0	0	1	0	0	.136	.182
Team totals	162	5545	651	1456	286	29	95	604	153	380	.263	.376

=== Pitching ===
Note: W = Wins; L = Losses; ERA = Earned run average; G = Games pitched; GS = Games started; SV = Saves; IP = Innings pitched; H = Hits allowed; R = Runs allowed; ER = Earned runs allowed; BB = Walks allowed; SO = Strikeouts

Player	W	L	ERA	G	GS	SV	IP	H	R	ER	BB	SO
James Shields	14	8	3.21	34	34	0	227.0	224	95	81	44	80
Jeremy Guthrie	13	11	4.13	32	32	0	202.2	215	100	93	49	124
Jason Vargas	11	10	3.71	30	30	0	187.0	197	82	77	41	128
Yordano Ventura	14	10	3.20	31	30	0	183.0	168	70	65	69	159
Danny Duffy	9	12	2.53	31	25	0	149.1	113	52	42	53	113
Wade Davis	9	2	1.00	71	0	3	72.0	38	8	8	23	109
Kelvin Herrera	4	3	1.41	70	0	0	70.0	54	12	11	26	59
Greg Holland	1	3	1.44	65	0	46	62.1	37	13	10	20	90
Aaron Crow	6	1	4.12	67	0	3	59.0	52	32	27	24	34
Bruce Chen	2	4	7.45	13	7	0	48.1	69	40	40	16	36
Louis Coleman	1	0	5.56	31	0	1	34.0	39	21	21	18	24
Francisley Bueno	0	0	4.18	30	0	0	32.1	36	16	15	7	20
Michael Mariot	1	0	6.48	17	0	0	25.0	31	21	18	12	21
Tim Collins	0	3	3.86	22	0	0	21.0	18	9	9	11	15
Liam Hendriks	0	2	4.66	6	3	0	19.1	26	12	10	3	15
Jason Frasor	3	0	1.53	23	0	0	17.2	13	3	3	4	16
Scott Downs	0	2	3.14	17	0	0	14.1	12	7	5	5	3
Casey Coleman	1	0	5.25	10	0	0	12.0	16	8	7	6	5
Brandon Finnegan	0	1	1.29	7	0	0	7.0	6	1	1	1	10
Aaron Brooks	0	1	43.88	2	1	0	2.2	12	13	13	3	2
Justin Marks	0	0	13.50	1	0	0	2.0	4	3	3	3	2
Wilking Rodríguez	0	0	0.00	2	0	0	2.0	1	0	0	1	1
Donnie Joseph	0	0	81.00	1	0	0	0.2	5	6	6	1	2
Team totals	89	73	3.51	162	162	53	1450.2	1386	624	565	440	1168

== Post-season ==
=== Wild Card Game, September 30 ===
7:07 p.m. CDT at Kauffman Stadium in Kansas City, Missouri

Team	1	2	3	4	5	6	7	8	9	10	11	12	R	H	E
Oakland	2	0	0	0	0	5	0	0	0	0	0	1	8	13	0
Kansas City	1	0	2	0	0	0	0	3	1	0	0	2	9	15	0
WP: Jason Frasor (1–0) LP: Dan Otero (0–1); Home runs: OAK: Brandon Moss 2 (2); KC: None

The one-game playoff was touted as a duel between the Royals' James Shields and the Athletics' Jon Lester, but neither starting pitcher would earn a decision in the game. Oakland's Brandon Moss homered early off of Shields with Coco Crisp on base, giving the Athletics a 2–0 advantage; Kansas City halved the lead in the bottom of the first when Billy Butler singled to score Nori Aoki. Lorenzo Cain and Eric Hosmer had RBI hits for the Royals in the third inning, vaulting Kansas City to a 3–2 lead. The fourth and fifth innings were scoreless, and Oakland proceeded to stitch together five runs in the top of the sixth as Moss homered a second time, scoring himself, Sam Fuld, and Josh Donaldson. Derek Norris and Crisp singled in two additional runs.

Both Oakland and Kansas City batted fruitlessly in the seventh inning, and Royals relief pitcher Kelvin Herrera recorded three straight outs in the top of the eighth. In the bottom of the eighth, with Kansas City six outs away from having their season ended, the Royals manufactured a productive inning of their own. Alcides Escobar singled, and then stole second base with Nori Aoki at the plate. Lorenzo Cain singled, scoring Escobar. Cain stole second base himself with Eric Hosmer batting; Hosmer was then walked, at which point starting pitcher Jon Lester was relieved by Luke Gregerson. Nerves seemed to get the better of Gregerson, who allowed Billy Butler to single and score Cain, and then allowed Hosmer to score from third base on a wild pitch. Gregerson struck out the next two batters to preserve the Athletics' lead, but the Royals had crept to within one run.

Closer Greg Holland took the mound for Kansas City and was somewhat shaky, walking three batters, but mustered the three required outs without major damage, and Kansas City took their one-run deficit to the bottom of the ninth.

Oakland's closer, Sean Doolittle, pitched in relief of Gregerson. Pinch-hitter Josh Willingham singled and was replaced by pinch-runner Jarrod Dyson. Dyson moved to second base on a successful bunt from Alcides Escobar, and then stole third with Aoki at bat. Aoki hit a deep sacrifice fly to right field for the second out of the inning, but Dyson was able to jog home, tying the game at 7–7 and completing the Royals' four-run comeback. Cain lined out to end the inning for Kansas City.

Brandon Finnegan began a strong inning of work in the tenth, replacing Greg Holland and recording three outs in quick succession. The Royals advanced Eric Hosmer to third base with two outs in the bottom of the tenth, but Salvador Pérez grounded out, putting a Royals victory on hold.

Finnegan again pitched well in the top of the eleventh, allowing only one hit and striking out Brandon Moss, who had already hit two home runs. Kansas City's offense produced in the bottom of the eleventh a situation identical to that of the tenth; the winning run stood 90 feet away with two outs, but Jayson Nix struck out to end the inning. Finnegan began the twelfth inning by walking Josh Reddick, who advanced to second on a sacrifice bunt by Jed Lowrie. Finnegan was then relieved by Jason Frasor. Pinch-hitter Alberto Callaspo of Oakland took a wild pitch from Frasor, allowing Reddick to go to third base. Callaspo then hit a line drive to left field, scoring Reddick. The new pitcher Frasor quickly stopped the bleeding by retiring Derek Norris and Nick Punto, but the Athletics had retaken the lead, 8–7.

Lorenzo Cain failed to start the bottom of the twelfth in a promising fashion, grounding out. The Oakland Athletics were two outs away from advancing to the ALDS. However, Hosmer nursed a lengthy at-bat into a deep left field hit that was poorly fielded, allowing him to reach third base. Christian Colon then singled to tie the game again, scoring Hosmer. Oakland pitcher Dan Otero was replaced by Fernando Abad, who threw to only one batter, Alex Gordon, who popped out. Abad was then relieved by Jason Hammel. Christian Colon, still on first base, stole second with Pérez at the plate. Pérez then singled to left field, scoring Colon and ending the marathon game with a Royals victory and a ticket to the ALDS against the Los Angeles Angels of Anaheim.

=== Division series ===
==== Game 1, October 2 ====
6:07 p.m. PDT at Angel Stadium of Anaheim in Anaheim, California

Team	1	2	3	4	5	6	7	8	9	10	11	R	H	E
Kansas City	0	0	1	0	1	0	0	0	0	0	1	3	4	0
Los Angeles	0	0	1	0	1	0	0	0	0	0	0	2	4	0
WP: Danny Duffy (1–0) LP: Fernando Salas (0–1) Sv: Holland (1); Home runs: KC: Mike Moustakas (1); LAA: Chris Iannetta (1), David Freese (1)

Mike Moustakas' solo home run in the top of the eleventh inning off of Angels pitcher Fernando Salas proved to be the difference for Kansas City, as the Royals surprised the favored Angels by winning a low-scoring Game 1. Moustakas also scored one of the Royals' other two runs, running home from first base on a double by Alcides Escobar in the third inning, giving Kansas City a 1–0. The Angels battled back quickly, though, as catcher Chris Iannetta homered with the bases empty off Jason Vargas for a 1–1 tie. The two teams traded runs again in the fifth—Alex Gordon scoring from second on an Omar Infante sac fly for the Royals, David Freese hitting a solo line drive home run for the Angels—before engaging in a scoreless battle for five innings until Moustakas' game-winner. Royals starter Vargas was replaced after six innings by a battery of relievers that included Kelvin Herrera, Brandon Finnegan, Wade Davis, Tim Collins, Jason Frasor, Danny Duffy, and Greg Holland. Herrera, however, left Game 1 with tightness in his right forearm, and the exit of the effective relief pitcher put a slight damper on the Royals' opening victory.

==== Game 2, October 3 ====
6:37 p.m. PDT at Angel Stadium of Anaheim in Anaheim, California

Team	1	2	3	4	5	6	7	8	9	10	11	R	H	E
Kansas City	0	1	0	0	0	0	0	0	0	0	3	4	8	0
Los Angeles	0	0	0	0	0	1	0	0	0	0	0	1	6	2
WP: Brandon Finnegan (1–0) LP: Kevin Jepsen (0–1) Sv: Greg Holland (2); Home runs: KC: Eric Hosmer (1); LAA: None

The eleventh inning was again a magical time for the Royals, as Eric Hosmer's two-run home run to right field broke a 1–1 tie and vaulted Kansas City over the Angels. Lorenzo Cain scored from first base on Hosmer's blast. The Royals added a third run when Alex Gordon walked, stole second and advanced to third on an Angels fielding error with Salvador Pérez at the plate, and then scored on a single by Perez. The Royals led 4–1 heading into the bottom of the eleventh inning, and closer Greg Holland retired three out of four batters faced to rack up his second postseason save and to send the Royals home to Kansas City with an opportunity to sweep the Angels in Game 3.

The Royals' one run prior to the eleventh came in the second inning, as Hosmer scored from second base on a Gordon single.

The Angels' lone run of the game came during the sixth inning. Kole Calhoun singled, Mike Trout walked, advancing Calhoun to second, and Calhoun scored from second courtesy of an Albert Pujols single.

The Angels very nearly broke the 1–1 tie and took the lead in the bottom of the eighth inning, but astute defensive play by the Royals kept the stalemate intact. Jarrod Dyson came into center field as the result of a defensive substitution. With Wade Davis on the mound, C. J. Cron doubled and was replaced by pinch-runner Collin Cowgill. Angels catcher Chris Iannetta hit the ball deep to center field, but Dyson made a difficult catch and then launched a laserlike throw to the third baseman Moustakas, who tagged out Cowgill, attempting to tag up from second, to complete a double play.

The Royals received a scare in the fifth inning when Los Angeles' Josh Hamilton hit catcher Salvador Pérez on the head with his bat on the follow-through of a swing. Perez underwent a brief concussion test while still on the field and remained in the game.

The Royals' victory also made them the first team in the history of Major League Baseball to win three straight extra inning games in the postseason.

==== Game 3, October 5 ====
6:37 p.m. CDT at Kauffman Stadium in Kansas City, Missouri

Team	1	2	3	4	5	6	7	8	9	R	H	E
Los Angeles	1	0	0	1	0	0	0	1	0	3	8	0
Kansas City	3	0	2	2	0	1	0	0	X	8	9	0
WP: James Shields (1–0) LP: C. J. Wilson (0–1); Home runs: LAA: Mike Trout (1), Albert Pujols (1); KC: Eric Hosmer (2), Mike Moustakas (2)

Royals starter James Shields gave up a home run to slugger Mike Trout to give the Angels an early 1–0 lead. However, back to back singles by Aoki and Cain and a walk to Billy Butler loaded the bases with one out. Alex Gordon came up and smacked the ball for a bases clearing double to put the Royals up 3–1. Angels starter C. J. Wilson didn't last more than two-thirds of one inning and was replaced by Vinnie Pestano after Gordon's hit.

Kansas City's offense struck again in the third inning as Eric Hosmer homered to center field with Nori Aoki on base, giving the Royals a capacious 5–1 lead. The Angels inched closer in the top of the fourth inning with a solo home run by Albert Pujols, but still trailed 5–2. In the bottom half of the inning, Mike Moustakas crushed a long ball of his own, such that Moustakas and Hosmer, who hit game-winning home runs in the top of the eleventh inning in Games 1 and 2, respectively, both homered again in Game 3. Alcides Escobar singled, found second base on a wild pitch from the Angels' Morin, took third on a single by Aoki, and scored on a Lorenzo Cain sacrifice fly, capping a 2-run fourth for Kansas City and putting the floundering Angels in a 7–2 hole.

The Royals' final run of the game was delivered in the sixth inning. Omar Infante walked, went to second base on an Escobar single, and scored from second on an Aoki single. Trailing 8–2, the Angels scrounged together one more run with Wade Davis pitching (Howie Kendrick doubled, to third on an Erick Aybar single, scoring on a Josh Hamilton ground out), but closer Greg Holland's effort was superb, racking three straight outs, two on strikeouts. The Royals advanced to the ALCS, and the Angels' highly anticipated season ended, with star center fielder Mike Trout striking out swinging.

The Baltimore Orioles had defeated the Detroit Tigers earlier in the day, securing their ticket to the ALCS. With the Royals having last reached the World Series in 1985 and the Orioles having last reached the World Series in 1983, the 2014 World Series is guaranteed to have a participant that has been absent from it for at least the last twenty-nine years.

=== American League Championship Series ===
==== Game 1, October 10 ====
8:07 p.m. EDT at Oriole Park at Camden Yards in Baltimore, Maryland

Team	1	2	3	4	5	6	7	8	9	10	R	H	E
Kansas City	0	0	4	0	1	0	0	0	0	3	8	12	1
Baltimore	0	0	1	0	3	1	0	0	0	1	6	14	1
WP: Wade Davis LP: Darren O'Day Sv: Greg Holland; Home runs: KC: Alcides Escobar (1), Alex Gordon (1), Mike Moustakas (3); BAL: None

For the fourth time in five games, the Royals broke an extra-innings tie, and for the third time in four games did so via longballs. Alex Gordon and Mike Moustakas both crushed respective solo and two-run home runs to combine for a three-run top of the tenth for Kansas City. The twin home runs came off of Orioles pitchers Brian Matusz and Darren O'Day. Salvador Pérez was on first base during Moustakas' home run, which proved to be the difference as the Orioles did manage to score one run in the bottom of the tenth before closer Greg Holland composed himself to record the final out. The Royals' offensive explosion in the tenth saved them from a potentially devastating situation in the ninth inning, when they failed to score a run despite having the bases loaded with no outs.

Kansas City had been aided previously in the game by an Alcides Escobar solo home run and an Alex Gordon 3-RBI double, both in the third inning. They added a run in the fifth when Billy Butler hit a sacrifice fly to score Lorenzo Cain, who had doubled. The Royals' bats then remained quiet until their game-winning performance in the tenth.

Baltimore struck for one run in the third inning (Nick Markakis scoring from third on an Adam Jones line drive) and for three runs in the fifth inning (Alejandro De Aza scored from second on a Nelson Cruz double, Cruz and Jones scored from second and third on a Ryan Flaherty line drive). The Orioles tied the score at 5–5 in the bottom of the sixth inning, as reliever Brandon Finnegan suffered some shakiness, walking Jonathan Schoop and surrendering a Nick Markakis line drive. Both stole bases with De Aza at the plate to advance to second and third base, and Schoop came home on a sacrifice fly by De Aza.

No scoring occurred in the seventh, eighth, or ninth innings. Wade Davis earned the win for the Royals, striking out the side in the bottom of the ninth, paving the way for Kansas City's three-run tenth.

==== Game 2, October 11 ====
4:07 p.m. EDT at Oriole Park at Camden Yards in Baltimore, Maryland

Team	1	2	3	4	5	6	7	8	9	R	H	E
Kansas City	2	0	1	1	0	0	0	0	2	6	13	1
Baltimore	0	1	2	0	1	0	0	0	0	4	9	1
WP: Wade Davis (2–0) LP: Darren O'Day (0–2) Sv: Greg Holland (2); Home runs: KC: Mike Moustakas (4); BAL: Adam Jones (1)

The Royals won only their second nine-inning game of the postseason, but still had to resort to late-game heroics to do so. With the score tied in the top of the ninth and with Darren O'Day pitching for the Orioles, Kansas City's Omar Infante hit a single toward third base. Infante was replaced by pinch runner Terrance Gore, and O'Day was relieved by Zach Britton. Mike Moustakas, with three home runs in the postseason, played small ball instead of long ball, laying down a sacrifice bunt to advance Gore to second. Alcides Escobar then doubled to right field to score Gore and give the Royals a 5–4 lead. Kansas City added insurance when Escobar reached third on a fielding error and then strolled home on a single by Dyson. Britton recovered to strike out both Eric Hosmer and Billy Butler, but the Royals' damage had yet again been done, and closer Greg Holland was effective for the second straight game in quelling an Orioles rally attempt.

The Royals had struck first at Camden Yards on this Saturday afternoon, with Hosmer driving in Nori Aoki and Lorenzo Cain in the top of the first inning. The O's halved the lead in the bottom of the second, milking one run out of a succession of walks and a sacrifice fly from starter Yordano Ventura, although Ventura composed himself sufficiently to ward off further Baltimore offense. Kansas City added a third run in the top of the third inning, as Cain singled, advanced to third base on a Hosmer line drive, and scored on a Butler double.

Baltimore roared back in the bottom of the third, however, as Adam Jones hit a line drive home run with Alejandro De Aza on base, pulling the Orioles even with the Royals.

With the score tied 3–3, each team scored one more run before a 4–4 stalemate that held until Kansas City's two-run ninth. In the top of the fourth inning, Mike Moustakas crushed his fourth home run of the playoffs off of Oriole starter Bud Norris. Baltimore pulled even again in the bottom of the fifth inning, as De Aza singled, advanced to third base on a Jones single, and made it to home plate during a force out at second base.

Neither starter lasted beyond the sixth inning, Ventura being pulled after 5.2 innings and Norris after only 4.1. Both recorded three strikeouts. The winning and losing pitchers, Wade Davis for Kansas City and Darren O'Day for Baltimore, were the same as in Game 1.

==== Game 3, October 14 ====
7:07 p.m. CDT at Kauffman Stadium in Kansas City, Missouri

Team	1	2	3	4	5	6	7	8	9	R	H	E
Baltimore	0	1	0	0	0	0	0	0	0	1	3	0
Kansas City	0	0	0	1	0	1	0	0	X	2	7	0
WP: Jason Frasor (1-0) LP: Wei-Yin Chen (0-1) Sv: Greg Holland (3)

Kansas City's Jeremy Guthrie pitched five solid innings and the Royals' bullpen was lights out during a 2–1 Game 3 victory that was less eventful and lower scoring than any of the Royals' previous postseason games. The Orioles struck first in the second inning, when Steve Pearce doubled and was then batted in by J. J. Hardy, but that was all the offense Baltimore would demonstrate. The Royals tied the score in the bottom of the fourth, as Lorenzo Cain scored from third base on an Alex Gordon ground ball. Kansas City then took the lead in the sixth, as Jarrod Dyson, pinch running for Nori Aoki, who had singled, moved from first to third base on a hit by Eric Hosmer, and then came to home plate on a sacrifice fly from Billy Butler. Royals closer Greg Holland was again effective in silencing any Orioles comeback attempts, retiring three straight batters in the top of the ninth to bring Kansas City within one win of the Fall Classic.

This third game of the series had been originally slated for Monday, but was postponed to Tuesday due to inclement weather. Game 4, which had been slated for Tuesday, was subsequently moved to Wednesday.

==== Game 4, October 15 ====
3:07 p.m. CDT at Kauffman Stadium in Kansas City, Missouri

Team	1	2	3	4	5	6	7	8	9	R	H	E
Baltimore	0	0	1	0	0	0	0	0	0	1	4	1
Kansas City	2	0	0	0	0	0	0	0	X	2	5	0
WP: Jason Vargas LP: Miguel González Sv: Greg Holland; Home runs: BAL: Ryan Flaherty; KC: None

The Royals would need only two first-inning runs and solid pitching from Jason Vargas to propel themselves into the World Series with an 8–0 postseason record and complete the sweep of Baltimore. Kansas City's lone offensive rally began with Alcides Escobar reaching first base and Nori Aoki being hit by a pitch to move Escobar to second. Following a ground ball by Eric Hosmer, a missed catch error by the Orioles' Caleb Joseph enabled both Escobar and Aoki to score and Hosmer to reach second base. The Orioles' lone run came via a Ryan Flaherty solo home run. Kelvin Herrera and Wade Davis again proved unhittable in relief, and closer Greg Holland recorded his fourth straight save.

=== World Series ===
The Royals faced the San Francisco Giants. The Royals were granted home-field advantage in the World Series after the American League won the All-Star Game.

==== Game 1, October 21 ====
7:07 p.m. CDT at Kauffman Stadium in Kansas City, Missouri

Team	1	2	3	4	5	6	7	8	9	R	H	E
San Francisco	3	0	0	2	0	0	2	0	0	7	10	1
Kansas City	0	0	0	0	0	0	1	0	0	1	4	0
WP: Madison Bumgarner (1–0) LP: James Shields (0–1); Home runs: SF: Hunter Pence; KC: Salvador Pérez

San Francisco starter Madison Bumgarner was brilliant through seven innings of work, surrendering only one RBI—a Salvador Pérez home run—and getting out of a bases-loaded jam in the third inning, and Hunter Pence delivered three RBIs, including a two-run home run, as the Giants handed the Royals their first postseason loss since Game 4 of the 1985 World Series. Kansas City's previously potent bats fell flat against Bumgarner. Trailing 4–0, they threatened briefly in the third inning when Lorenzo Cain came back from an 0–2 count to walk and load the bases with two outs, Omar Infante and Mike Moustakas having reached base previously. But Eric Hosmer grounded out with the bases loaded to preserve Bumgarner's shutout, broken up by only Perez's solo long ball.

==== Game 2, October 22 ====
7:07 p.m. CDT at Kauffman Stadium in Kansas City, Missouri

Team	1	2	3	4	5	6	7	8	9	R	H	E
San Francisco	1	0	0	1	0	0	0	0	0	2	9	0
Kansas City	1	1	0	0	0	5	0	0	X	7	10	0
WP: Kelvin Herrera (1–0) LP: Jake Peavy (0–1); Home runs: SF: Gregor Blanco; KC: Omar Infante

The Royals and Giants battled to a 2–2 stalemate through five innings, until Kansas City's offense ignited–and San Francisco's pitching melted–in the sixth. The Giants used five pitchers in one inning as Lorenzo Cain scored from second base on a hit by Billy Butler, Salvador Pérez hit a 2RBI double scoring Eric Hosmer and Terrance Gore, and Omar Infante blasted a home run to left field, scoring himself and Perez. The Giants went limp offensively after the Royals' five-run inning, and never closed the 7–2 gap. Kansas City's Kelvin Herrera–Wade Davis–Greg Holland relief lineup again kept the lead intact.

The Royals' victory evens the World Series at one game apiece and thus forces a Game 5 on Sunday, October 26.

==== Game 3, October 24 ====
5:07 p.m. PDT at AT&T Park in San Francisco, California

Team	1	2	3	4	5	6	7	8	9	R	H	E
Kansas City	1	0	0	0	0	2	0	0	0	3	6	0
San Francisco	0	0	0	0	0	2	0	0	0	2	4	0
WP: Jeremy Guthrie LP: Tim Hudson Sv: Greg Holland

The Royals took a 2–1 series lead in the first tilt of the Fall Classic that was a closely contested pitchers' duel instead of a lopsided hitting spree, as Games 1 and 2 had been. Kansas City hung one run on the Giants in the top of the first inning (Alcides Escobar doubling, and then advancing to third and scoring on two ground outs). However, the majority of offense came in the sixth. Still holding onto a 1–0 cushion, the Royals began a two-run inning as Escobar singled. Alex Gordon doubled, scoring Escobar. Following a Lorenzo Cain ground out, San Francisco starter Tim Hudson, who had pitched 5 2/3 innings, was relieved by Javier López, but López could not completely shut down the Royals' offense, allowing Eric Hosmer to single to center field, scoring Gordon, before he struck out Mike Moustakas to end the inning.

In the bottom of the sixth, the Giants gave Kansas City some pitching hiccups of their own. Brandon Crawford scored from first base on a Michael Morse double. Kelvin Herrera was then summoned to replace starter Jeremy Guthrie. Again, as with López in the top of the inning, the presence of the new pitcher Herrera did not immediately stop the bleeding for Kansas City, as Morse advanced to third base and then scored on respective Joe Panik and Buster Posey ground outs. Herrera kept San Francisco to a two-run inning as heavy hitting Pablo Sandoval grounded out.

The Royals' bullpen, this time adding Brandon Finnegan to the usual late-inning Herrera–Wade Davis–Greg Holland lineup, kept the Giants at bay for the remaining three innings. Kansas City never recorded an insurance run to pad their 3–2 lead, but the closer Holland racked up three straight outs to secure a Royals victory without further rebut.

==== Game 4, October 25 ====
5:07 p.m. PDT at AT&T Park in San Francisco, California

Team	1	2	3	4	5	6	7	8	9	R	H	E
Kansas City	0	0	4	0	0	0	0	0	0	4	12	1
San Francisco	1	0	1	0	2	3	4	0	0	11	16	0
WP: Yusmeiro Petit LP: Brandon Finnegan

The World Series was forced to at least a sixth game back in Kansas City following a definitive and conclusive victory by the Giants in which they attacked the Royals' bullpen in the fifth, sixth, and seventh innings, especially rookie Brandon Finnegan, who surrendered five earned runs. Hunter Pence, Pablo Sandoval, and Joe Panik all had multi-RBI games for San Francisco. Eric Hosmer, Mike Moustakas, Omar Infante, and Salvador Pérez had combined for a four-run fourth inning for the Royals, who held a 4–2 lead heading into the bottom of the fifth, when the Giants tied the game with Pence and Juan Pérez RBIs, one with Jason Frasor pitching, the other with Danny Duffy on the mound. Finnegan then replaced Duffy prior to San Francisco's three-run sixth, which included a 2-RBI line drive from Sandoval and a Brandon Belt RBI single. The Giants added further insult to injury with a four-run seventh.

The Royals never scored in the game outside of their four-run third inning, and this time it was the Giants who used an effective lineup of seventh, eighth, and ninth-inning relievers to quell any further Kansas City threat.

==== Game 5, October 26 ====
5:07 p.m. PDT at AT&T Park in San Francisco, California

Team	1	2	3	4	5	6	7	8	9	R	H	E
Kansas City	0	0	0	0	0	0	0	0	0	0	4	1
San Francisco	0	1	0	1	0	0	0	3	X	5	12	0
WP: Madison Bumgarner LP: James Shields

Madison Bumgarner was the only pitcher the Giants required to take a 3–2 lead in the World Series over the Royals, again puzzling Kansas City hitters as he had in Game 1. Kansas City starter James Shields was more effective than four games earlier, only surrendering two runs across seven innings of work, but the Giants added three runs insurance off Royals relievers Kelvin Herrera and Wade Davis. San Francisco's five runs were delivered by only two batters: Juan Pérez, who batted in two, and Brandon Crawford, who drove in three.

This was the fourth postseason shutout suffered by the Royals in franchise history, following Game 1 of the 1981 American League Division Series, Game 4 of the 1984 American League Championship Series, and Game 4 of the 1985 World Series.

==== Game 6, October 28 ====
7:07 p.m. CDT at Kauffman Stadium in Kansas City, Missouri

Team	1	2	3	4	5	6	7	8	9	R	H	E
San Francisco	0	0	0	0	0	0	0	0	0	0	6	0
Kansas City	0	7	1	0	1	0	1	0		10	9	0
WP: Yordano Ventura LP: Jake Peavy; Home runs: SF: None; KC: Mike Moustakas

Lorenzo Cain drove in three runs, and Mike Moustakas batted in two as the Royals forced a decisive seventh game in domineering fashion, saddling Giants starter Jake Peavy for five earned runs as part of a seven-run second inning. Peavy's struggles came on the heels of a 7–2 Royals victory in Game 2 for which he was also charged with the loss. Contrarily, Kansas City's Yordano Ventura pitched seven innings and only surrendered three hits. Ventura honored St. Louis Cardinals outfielder and fellow Dominican Republic countryman Oscar Taveras, who had died two days earlier in a car crash, with the message "R.I.P. O.T. #18" scrawled onto his cap. When Kansas City turned to its bullpen, it appeared to save Kelvin Herrera, Wade Davis, and Greg Holland for Game 7, using Jason Frasor and Tim Collins instead.

==== Game 7, October 29 ====
7:07 p.m. CDT at Kauffman Stadium in Kansas City, Missouri

Team	1	2	3	4	5	6	7	8	9	R	H	E
San Francisco	0	2	0	1	0	0	0	0	0	3	8	1
Kansas City	0	2	0	0	0	0	0	0	0	2	6	0
WP: Jeremy Affeldt (1-0) LP: Jeremy Guthrie (1-1) Sv: Madison Bumgarner (1)

The Royals were 90 feet away from tying the decisive seventh game at three runs apiece in the bottom of the ninth, having trailed by a run for the previous five innings. Left fielder Alex Gordon hit a controversial two out single, which was dramatically followed up with two fielding errors by San Francisco's center fielder Gregor Blanco and left fielder Juan Perez, allowing Gordon to reach third standing up. Unfortunately for Kansas City, Salvador Pérez, the next batter, popped a ball up into foul territory on a 2–2 count, which was easily caught by Giants third baseman Pablo Sandoval to give San Francisco their third World Series victory in five seasons and crush Kansas City's Cinderella run through the postseason. Madison Bumgarner worked on short rest for San Francisco; although he did not start the game, he came into relieve Jeremy Affeldt (who had himself relieved starter Tim Hudson) in the fifth inning and pitched five innings in a masterful performance that prevented the Royals' offense from igniting. Bumgarner was awarded a save; the win went to Affeldt. No scoring occurred after the fourth inning, when Pablo Sandoval came home from third on a one-out hit to right field by Michael Morse. This would prove to be the World Series-winning run for the Giants. Prior to the fourth inning, both teams scored two runs each in the second inning. Alex Gordon and Omar Infante batted in the Royals' only runs.

=== Postseason game log ===
2014 Kansas City Royals Postseason Game Log (11–4)
AL Wild Card Game vs. Oakland Athletics

#	Date	Opponent	Score	Win	Loss	Save	Attendance	Series
1	September 30	Athletics	9–8 (12)	Frasor (1–0)	Otero (0–1)		40,502	1–0

AL Division Series vs. Los Angeles Angels of Anaheim

#	Date	Opponent	Score	Win	Loss	Save	Attendance	Series
1	October 2	@ Angels	3–2 (11)	Duffy (1–0)	Salas (0–1)	Holland (1)	45,321	1–0
2	October 3	@ Angels	4–1 (11)	Finnegan (1–0)	Jepsen (0–1)	Holland (2)	45,361	2–0
3	October 5	Angels	8–3	Shields (1–0)	Wilson (0–1)		40,657	3–0

AL Championship Series vs. Baltimore Orioles

#	Date	Opponent	Score	Win	Loss	Save	Attendance	Series
1	October 10	@ Orioles	8–6 (10)	Davis (1–0)	O'Day (0–1)	Holland (1)	47,124	1–0
2	October 11	@ Orioles	6–4	Davis (2–0)	O'Day (0–2)	Holland (2)	46,912	2–0
3	October 14	Orioles	2–1	Frasor (1–0)	Chen (0–1)	Holland (3)	40,183	3–0
4	October 15	Orioles	2–1	Vargas (1–0)	González (0–1)	Holland (4)	40,468	4–0

World Series vs. San Francisco Giants

#	Date	Opponent	Score	Win	Loss	Save	Attendance	Series
1	October 21	Giants	1–7	Bumgarner (1–0)	Shields (0–1)		40,459	0–1
2	October 22	Giants	7–2	Herrera (1–0)	Peavy (0–1)		40,446	1–1
3	October 24	@ Giants	3–2	Guthrie (1–0)	Hudson (0–1)	Holland (1)	43,020	2–1
4	October 25	@ Giants	4–11	Petit (1–0)	Finnegan (0–1)		43,066	2–2
5	October 26	@ Giants	0–5	Bumgarner (2–0)	Shields (0–2)		43,087	2–3
6	October 28	Giants	10–0	Ventura (1–0)	Peavy (0–2)		40,372	3–3
7	October 29	Giants	2–3	Affeldt (1–0)	Guthrie (1–1)	Bumgarner (1)	40,535	3–4

== Farm system ==
Level	Team	League	Manager
AAA	Omaha Storm Chasers	Pacific Coast League	Brian Poldberg
AA	Northwest Arkansas Naturals	Texas League	Vance Wilson
A	Wilmington Blue Rocks	Carolina League	Darryl Kennedy
A	Lexington Legends	South Atlantic League	Brian Buchanan
Rookie	Burlington Royals	Appalachian League	Tommy Shields
Rookie	Idaho Falls Chukars	Pioneer League	Omar Ramírez

LEAGUE CHAMPIONS: Omaha
