= 2014 American League Championship Series =

45th edition of Major League Baseball's American League Championship Series

Team (Wins)	Managers	Season
Kansas City Royals (4)	Ned Yost	89–73 (.549), GB: 1
Baltimore Orioles (0)	Buck Showalter	96–66 (.593), GA: 12
- Dates: October 10–15
- MVP: Lorenzo Cain (Kansas City)
- Umpires: Joe West (crew chief), Tim Timmons (Games 1–2), Marvin Hudson, Ron Kulpa, Mark Wegner, Brian Gorman, Dan Iassogna (Games 3–4)

Broadcast
- Television: TBS (United States); MLB International (International)
- TV announcers: Ernie Johnson Jr., Ron Darling, Cal Ripken Jr., Matt Winer, Steve Physioc, and Mike Bordick (TBS); Gary Thorne and Rick Sutcliffe (MLB International)
- Radio: ESPN
- Radio announcers: Jon Sciambi and Chris Singleton
- ALDS: Kansas City Royals over Los Angeles Angels of Anaheim (3–0); Baltimore Orioles over Detroit Tigers (3–0)

The 2014 American League Championship Series was a best-of-seven playoff pitting the second-seeded Baltimore Orioles against the fourth-seeded Kansas City Royals for the American League pennant and the right to play in the 2014 World Series. The Royals won the series four games to zero. The series was the 45th in league history with TBS airing all games in the United States. Even as the Royals swept the series, each game was decided by two runs or fewer.

It was the first-ever postseason meeting between the two teams. It was the first ALCS since 2005 not to feature the Yankees, Red Sox, or Tigers.

The Royals would go on to lose to the San Francisco Giants in the World Series.

== Matchup ==
=== Baltimore Orioles vs Kansas City Royals ===
Kansas City won the series, 4–0.

Game	Date	Score	Location	Time	Attendance
1	October 10	Kansas City Royals – 8, Baltimore Orioles – 6 (10)	Oriole Park at Camden Yards	4:37	47,124
2	October 11	Kansas City Royals – 6, Baltimore Orioles – 4	Oriole Park at Camden Yards	4:17	46,912
3	October 14*	Baltimore Orioles – 1, Kansas City Royals – 2	Kauffman Stadium	2:55	40,183
4	October 15	Baltimore Orioles – 1, Kansas City Royals – 2	Kauffman Stadium	2:56	40,468

*: postponed from October 13 due to rain

== Game summaries ==
=== Game 1 ===
October 10, 2014 8:07 p.m. (EDT) at Oriole Park at Camden Yards in Baltimore, Maryland 59 °F (15 °C), chance of rain
Team	1	2	3	4	5	6	7	8	9	10	R	H	E
Kansas City	0	0	4	0	1	0	0	0	0	3	8	12	1
Baltimore	0	0	1	0	3	1	0	0	0	1	6	14	1
WP: Wade Davis (1–0) LP: Darren O'Day (0–1) Sv: Greg Holland (1); Home runs: KC: Alcides Escobar (1), Alex Gordon (1), Mike Moustakas (1); BAL: None; Attendance: 47,124; Boxscore

The Royals drew first blood in a back-and-forth opener that featured high offensive output from both teams. After hitting just three home runs in the regular season, Alcides Escobar hit a one-out homer to left to give the Royals a 1–0 lead. Later in the inning, with the bases loaded, Alex Gordon hit a broken bat, looping fly ball that dropped just fair inside the right-field line to plate all three runners. Suddenly, it was 4–0 Kansas City. Baltimore got a run back in the bottom of the inning on Adam Jones' RBI-single, but it could have been more had it not been for a great diving catch by Gordon in the left-center field gap, robbing Steven Pearce of a hit. In the bottom of the fifth, after the Royals added a run in the top of the frame, the Orioles finally got to James Shields. Nelson Cruz added to his postseason legacy with an RBI-double and Ryan Flaherty delivered a two-run single to make it a one-run game, 5–4. In the sixth, after a walk to Jonathan Schoop and a flare single to right by Nick Markakis, Alejandro De Aza hit a high chopper past the pitcher's mound that shortstop Escobar had no play on; Schoop scored to tie the game. Jones hit what appeared to be a double play ball, but Mike Moustaskas' relay throw short-hopped first baseman Eric Hosmer and the inning continued to bring up Cruz. He could not deliver the big hit this time as he rolled into an inning-ending double play.

The game turned to the bullpens, generally decided to be a strength for both teams, but in the top of the ninth, Orioles' reliever Zach Britton struggled to find the strike zone, walking the first three batters; at one point, Britton missed with 12 straight pitches. Britton then got out of the jam by getting Hosmer on a force play at home, before Darren O'Day was brought in to pitch, getting Billy Butler to hit into a double play to keep the game tied heading to the bottom of the ninth.

Wade Davis finished a strong outing by striking out the heart of the Orioles' lineup in the bottom of the ninth, and Game 1 was headed to extra innings. Alex Gordon's postseason breakout was complete when his tenth inning fly landed over the top of the high right-field wall to give Kansas City a 6–5 lead, but they weren't done yet. Salvador Pérez reached on a walk, then Moustakas launched his third home run of the playoffs, giving the Royals a three-run lead.

Royals' closer Greg Holland got the first two outs in the bottom of the tenth, but then gave up a single to Flaherty. Pinch-hitter Jimmy Paredes reached on a walk, then Delmon Young delivered a pinch-hit single to make it a two-run game. Holland would then get Markakis to ground out to second, ending the game and giving the Royals a 1-0 lead in the series.

The Orioles' loss marked the beginning of an ongoing ten-game losing streak in the postseason.

=== Game 2 ===
October 11, 2014 4:07 p.m. (EDT) at Oriole Park at Camden Yards in Baltimore, Maryland 57 °F (14 °C), overcast
Team	1	2	3	4	5	6	7	8	9	R	H	E
Kansas City	2	0	1	1	0	0	0	0	2	6	13	1
Baltimore	0	1	2	0	1	0	0	0	0	4	9	1
WP: Wade Davis (2–0) LP: Darren O'Day (0–2) Sv: Greg Holland (2); Home runs: KC: Mike Moustakas (2); BAL: Adam Jones (1); Attendance: 46,912; Boxscore

The Royals struck first in Game 2 off of Bud Norris when with one out in the first when Nori Aoki singled, Lorenzo Cain doubled, and Eric Hosmer singled to score both runners. In the bottom of the second, Yordano Ventura walked three batters to load the bases for the Orioles before Caleb Joseph's sacrifice fly cut the Royals' lead to 2–1. They get the run back in the third when Cain singled with two outs, moved to third on Hosmer's single and scored on Billy Butler's double. In the bottom of the inning, Alejandro De Aza doubled before Adam Jones's two-run home run tied the game. In the fourth, Mike Moustakas's home run put the Royals back in front 4–3. The Orioles tied it in the fifth when De Aza singled, moved to third on Jones's single, and scored on Nelson Cruz's groundout.

The Kansas City defense continued their postseason run of highlight reel plays in the 6th when Adam Jones led off the inning with what appeared to be (at least) a double to the right-center field gap. However, Cain made diving catch to retire Jones. Statcast calculated that Cain covered 82 feet (25 m) in 3.65 seconds, reaching a top speed of 21.2 miles per hour (34.1 km/h) on the play. In the 7th, Cain (now playing in right field) would make another great catch, with the bases loaded, down the right field line to rob J. J. Hardy of at least 2 RBI.

The game stayed tied until the top of the ninth when Omar Infante hit a leadoff single off of Darren O'Day. Terrance Gore came in to pinch-run for Infante and moved to second on a sacrifice bunt after Zach Britton relieved O'Day, and the speedy runner scored easily on Alcides Escobar's double. After Jarrod Dyson reached on an error, Lorenzo Cain's single made it 6-4 Royals. Greg Holland threw a scoreless bottom of the ninth for his second save of the series. This was the last playoff game to take place at Camden Yards until the 2023 ALDS.

=== Game 3 ===
October 14, 2014 8:07 p.m. (EDT) at Kauffman Stadium in Kansas City, Missouri 59 °F (15 °C), mostly clear
Team	1	2	3	4	5	6	7	8	9	R	H	E
Baltimore	0	1	0	0	0	0	0	0	0	1	3	0
Kansas City	0	0	0	1	0	1	0	0	X	2	7	0
WP: Jason Frasor (1–0) LP: Wei-Yin Chen (0–1) Sv: Greg Holland (3); Attendance: 40,183; Boxscore

The Orioles struck first in Game 3 on back-to-back doubles in the second by Steve Pearce and J. J. Hardy off of Jeremy Guthrie, but that would be the only time they led in the series as four relievers threw four perfect innings. The Royals loaded the bases in the fourth on two singles and a walk off of Wei-Yin Chen before Alex Gordon's groundout tied the game. In the sixth, Nori Aoki hit a leadoff single off of Chen, moved to third on Eric Hosmer's single one out later, and scored on Billy Butler's sacrifice fly. The Royals' 2–1 lead held, with Jason Frasor pitching a perfect 6th (and earning the win), Kelvin Herrera a perfect 7th, Wade Davis a perfect 8th, and Greg Holland a perfect 9th for the save, putting them one win away from the World Series.

The Royals continued their postseason streak of highlight reel defensive plays, this time highlighted by Mike Moustakas. In the 4th he dove and snagged a hard liner from Steve Pearce for an out, but that play seemed routine compared to his play in the 6th. Adam Jones popped a ball up in foul territory past 3rd base. Moustakas gave chase and caught the ball while falling over the railing and into the fan dugout, where the loyal Royals fans caught him to prevent him from landing on his head.

=== Game 4 ===
October 15, 2014 4:07 p.m. (EDT) at Kauffman Stadium in Kansas City, Missouri 67 °F (19 °C), sunny
Team	1	2	3	4	5	6	7	8	9	R	H	E
Baltimore	0	0	1	0	0	0	0	0	0	1	4	1
Kansas City	2	0	0	0	0	0	0	0	X	2	5	0
WP: Jason Vargas (1–0) LP: Miguel González (0–1) Sv: Greg Holland (4); Home runs: BAL: Ryan Flaherty (1); KC: None; Attendance: 40,468; Boxscore

In Game 4, the Royals took a 2–0 lead in the first off of Miguel Gonzalez when Alcides Escobar hit a leadoff single and moved to second on Nori Aoki's hit-by-pitch. Lorenzo Cain's sacrifice bunt (the eventual ALCS MVP's first ever sacrifice bunt) moved both runners a base before Eric Hosmer grounded to first. Baseman Steve Pearce threw the ball to catcher Caleb Joseph, but the ball got away, allowing Escobar and Aoki to score. Though Gonzalez and the Orioles bullpen shut out the Royals for the rest of the game, Jason Vargas and the Kansas City bullpen limited Baltimore to only Ryan Flaherty's home run in the third and four hits. The Royals extended their postseason win streak to 11 games, dating back to Game 5 of the 1985 World Series. This win gave Kansas City its first American League Pennant since 1985 (and third overall, the most of any AL expansion franchise), and for the first time in Major League history, a team won all eight of their first postseason games (the previous record was seven, held by the 2007 Colorado Rockies and the 1976 Cincinnati Reds).

The Kansas City 8-game postseason winning streak wouldn't be complete without a defensive gem, this time provided by multi-time gold-glove left-fielder Alex Gordon. In the 5th, J. J. Hardy looked to have an extra-base hit deep to left-center field, but Gordon, running full speed, leaped and caught the ball, while crashing into the wall for the out.

== Composite line score ==
2014 ALCS (4–0): Kansas City Royals over Baltimore Orioles

Team	1	2	3	4	5	6	7	8	9	10	R	H	E
Kansas City Royals	4	0	5	2	1	1	0	0	2	3	18	37	2
Baltimore Orioles	0	2	4	0	4	1	0	0	0	1	12	30	3
Total attendance: 174,687 Average attendance: 43,672

== Aftermath ==
The Royals lost the World Series in seven games to the Giants, in a series defined by the dominance of Madison Bumgarner. Bumgarner won twice in the series and held a lead in game seven with a five inning save on 2-days rest. Their disappointment would be short lived as the Royals won it all the following season, beating the Mets in the World Series in five games. It was their first World Series victory since 1985.

There would be a bit of bad blood between the two teams in 2015 and 2016, with Yordano Ventura and Manny Machado at the center of it. In a game on September 12, 2015, Ventura hit Machado and Chris Davis with pitches, which ultimately just led to words between exchanged between the two teams. Tensions exploded in the fifth inning of a June 7, 2016 game between the Kansas City Royals and the Baltimore Orioles after Ventura hit Manny Machado again with a high 90s fastball in the back. This time it led to Machado rushing the mound and getting a few punches in on Ventura before his Royals teammates intervened. Both players were ejected and suspended; Ventura for 9 games, while Machado received a shorter 4 game ban.

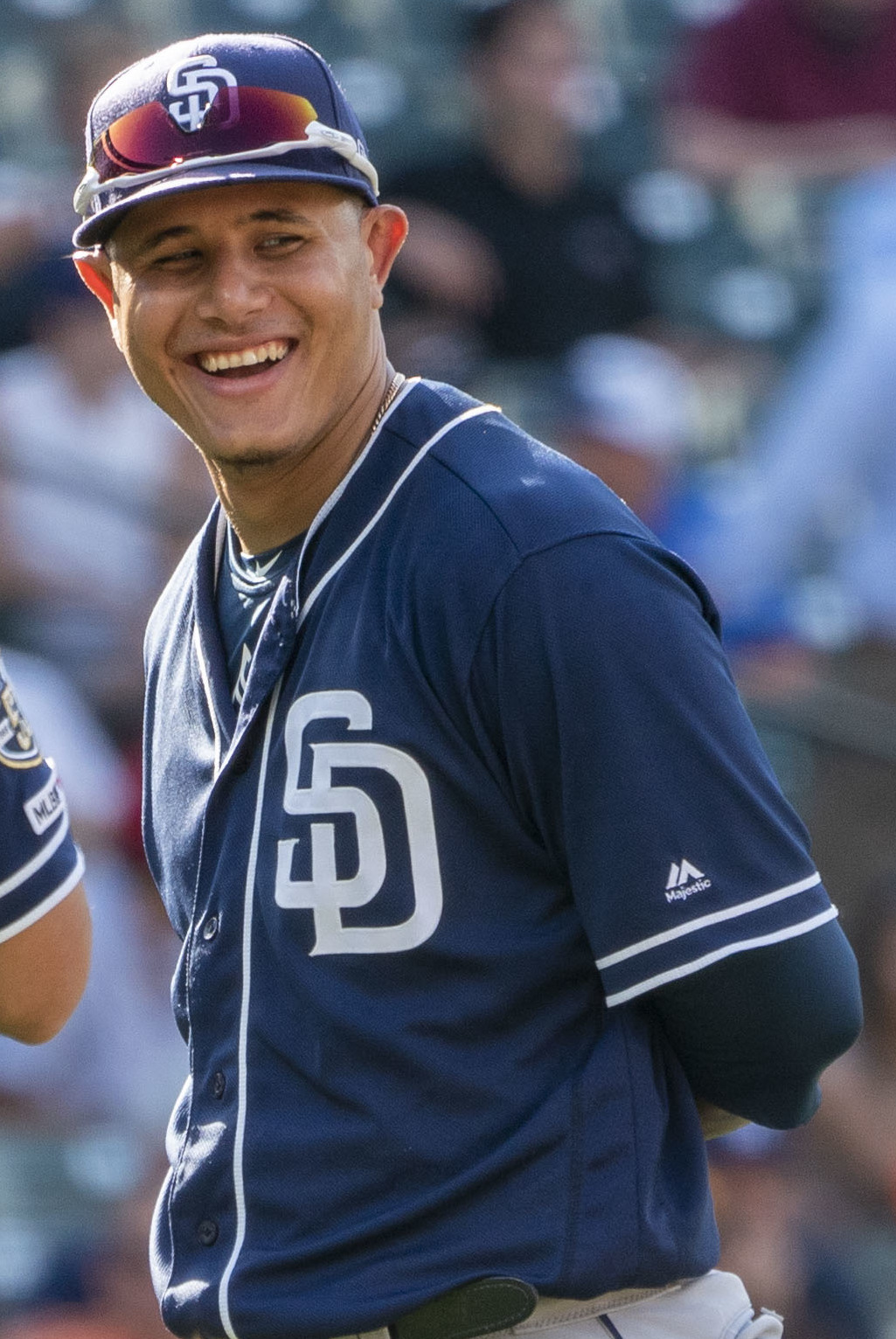
Manny Machado has played for the Dodgers and Padres since being traded from the Orioles in 2018

The Orioles could not build off their AL Championship Series appearance, as their lone appearance represented a peak for the franchise under the Buck Showalter-era. They finished with a .500 record in 2015, they lost the AL Wild Card Game to Toronto on a walk-off home run by Edwin Encarnación in 2016, and finished with a losing record for the first time since 2011 in 2017. Headed into the 2018 season, the Orioles were uncertain whether they were still a contender, in spite of having finished last in the AL East the previous season. On-field results quickly demonstrated that contention was out of the question, as they were instead threatening the franchise record for most losses in a season. With the trading deadline approaching, the front office decided to clean house. In the span of a few days, they traded veteran SS Manny Machado, their lone All-Star, 2B Jonathan Schoop and pitchers Brad Brach, Zach Britton, Kevin Gausman and Darren O'Day, netting a total of 17 players in return with only IF Jonathan Villar the only player they received that had any significant major league experience. They also attempted to trade CF Adam Jones, but he vetoed a deal via his 10-5 right (a player who had ten years of major league experience, including the past five with the same team, could block a trade). The only veterans which the Orioles retained were those who were basically unmovable because of bad contracts, such as underperforming 1B Chris Davis. The Orioles did end up setting a new franchise record for losses in 2018, finishing at 47–115, a whopping 61 games behind the first-place Boston Red Sox. The Orioles next winning record did not come until 2022, when they went 83–79. They did not make the postseason again until the following season when they went 101-61 and won the American League East for the first time since 2014.

The Royals and Orioles would meet in the postseason again in the 2024 American League Wild Card Series, with the Royals sweeping the short series in 2 games.
