= Lorenzo Cain =

American baseball player (born 1986)

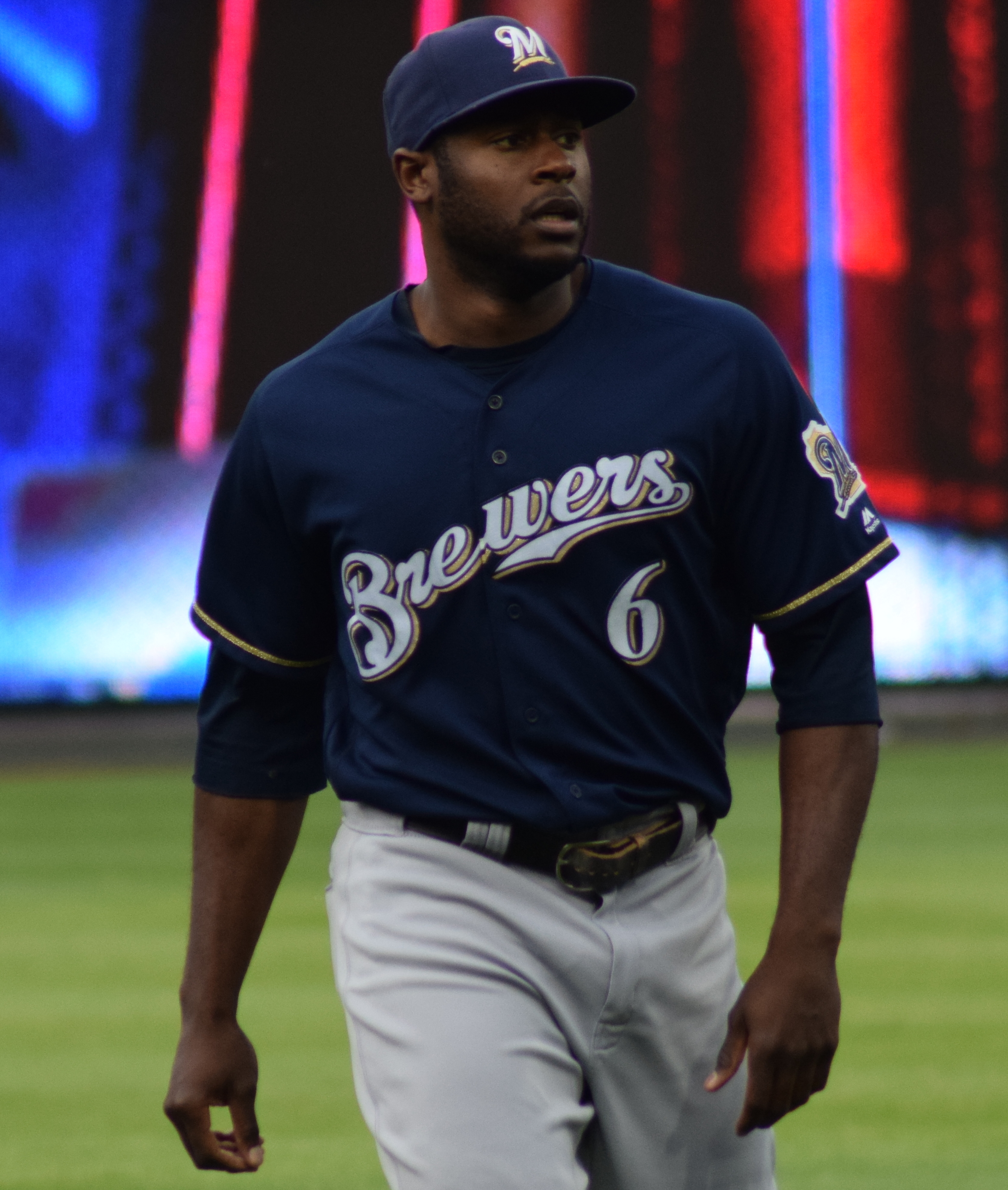
- Cain with the Milwaukee Brewers in 2018
- Center fielder
- Born: April 13, 1986 (age 40); Valdosta, Georgia, U.S.
- Batted: Right Threw: Right

MLB debut
- July 16, 2010, for the Milwaukee Brewers

Last MLB appearance
- June 16, 2022, for the Milwaukee Brewers

MLB statistics
- Batting average: .283
- Home runs: 87
- Runs batted in: 454
- Stats at Baseball Reference

Teams
- Milwaukee Brewers (2010); Kansas City Royals (2011–2017); Milwaukee Brewers (2018–2022)

Career highlights and awards
- 2× All-Star (2015, 2018); World Series champion (2015); ALCS MVP (2014); Gold Glove Award (2019)

Lorenzo Lamar Cain (born April 13, 1986) is an American former professional baseball center fielder. He played in Major League Baseball (MLB) for the Milwaukee Brewers and the Kansas City Royals. The Brewers drafted him in the 17th round of the 2004 MLB draft from Tallahassee Community College in Florida. In 2010, Cain made his MLB debut, and, following the season, the Brewers traded him to Kansas City with three other players for pitcher Zack Greinke.

Four years later, he placed in the top 10 in the American League in batting average (.301) and stolen bases (28). Known for his defensive acrobatics, he won four Wilson Defensive Player of the Year Awards for outfielders and three Fielding Bible Awards. Further, he won the 2014 American League Championship Series Most Valuable Player Award due in part to his defensive play. He finished third in MVP voting in 2015, and seventh in MVP voting 2018.

== Early life ==
Cain's father died when Lorenzo was four years old. His mother, Patricia, raised him and his brother, and still works at a printing plant in Madison, Florida.

In contrast to most professional ballplayers, Cain did not start playing baseball until his sophomore year in Florida's Madison County High School. He only did so, he said, because he was not chosen for the school basketball team. At the time, Cain didn't own a baseball glove.

== Professional career ==
=== Minor leagues ===
The Milwaukee Brewers selected Cain in the 17th round of the 2004 MLB draft out of Tallahassee Community College. He began his career in 2005, playing for their Rookie League Helena Brewers and AZL Brewers. In 2006, he was promoted to the Class A West Virginia Power, where he was named to the South Atlantic League's mid and post-season All-Star teams.

Cain was promoted to their Class A-Advanced Brevard County Manatees in 2007. Beginning the 2008 season in Brevard County, Cain was called up to the Triple-A Nashville Sounds on June 10 to replace outfielder Hernán Iribarren, who was recalled by Milwaukee.

=== Milwaukee Brewers (2010) ===
Cain was called up to the Brewers when pitcher Doug Davis was placed on the disabled list on July 16, 2010. He made his major league debut against the Atlanta Braves that evening as a pinch-hitter. He was robbed of a hit in his first at-bat due to a diving catch by Braves left fielder Matt Diaz. Two days later, in his next at bat in that same series, he got his first major league hit. He then replaced CF Carlos Gómez for the rest of the game and finished the game 2 for 2 with two singles; Cain went on to appear in 43 games for the Brewers.

=== Kansas City Royals (2011–2017) ===
On December 18, 2010, he was traded to the Kansas City Royals with Alcides Escobar, Jeremy Jeffress, and Jake Odorizzi for Zack Greinke and Yuniesky Betancourt. Cain was sent down to KC's AAA ball club, the Omaha Storm Chasers, before the start of the 2011 MLB season, and played six games in his initial season with the Royals. On February 18, 2012, the Royals announced they had signed Cain to a one-year contract for the 2012 season. No financial terms of the deal were released.

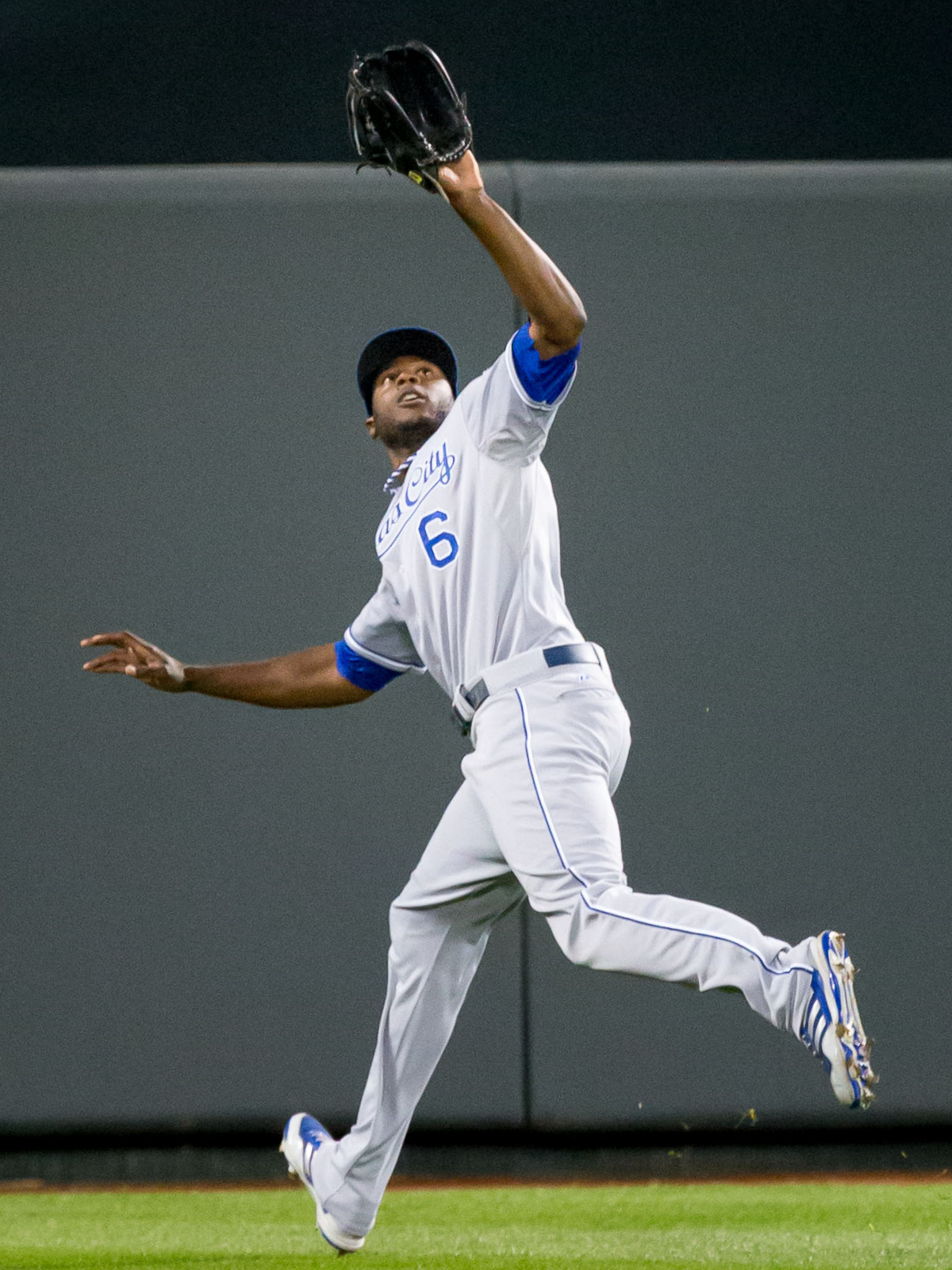
Cain playing for the Kansas City Royals in 2013

Cain began 2013 as the starting center fielder, with Jarrod Dyson as the backup. Around late June, Dyson started getting more starts. On August 10, Cain was placed on the disabled list with a strained left oblique, When he returned on September 4, Cain had 14 more starts on the season, 7 in right and 7 in center field. In 115 games (106 starts), Cain hit .251/.310/.348 with 4 home runs, 46 RBIs and 14 stolen bases.

In 2014, Cain finished the regular season hitting .301/.339/.412 with five home runs (one inside the park), four triples, 29 doubles, 28 stolen bases, 46 RBIs, and 55 runs in 133 games. Both his batting average and stolen base total placed eighth in the AL. He notched twice as many infield hits as he had the year before – this as a result of the work he had done with Al Hobson, track coach at Kansas City Kansas Community College to improve his base-running sprint speed.

The Royals made the playoffs for the first time since winning the 1985 World Series, reaching the 2014 American League Wild Card Game versus the Oakland Athletics. Batting 3rd, Cain went 2-for-6 and drove in two runs, with the second one being the first of a late comeback that saw Kansas City overtake a 7-3 deficit in the 8th and 9th that saw them eventually win in the 12th inning. In the Division Series, Cain's defensive play in center field – featuring four spectacular catches in two games – was widely credited with helping the Royals sweep the highly favored Los Angeles Angels of Anaheim.

In Game 2 of the American League Championship Series (ALCS) against the Baltimore Orioles, Cain added to his postseason highlight reel with yet another stunning, extra-base hit-stealing grab, this one of a J. J. Hardy line drive to right center field in the 6th inning to preserve a 4–4 tie. At the plate, he went 4-for-5, tying George Brett's franchise record for most hits in a postseason game, and drove in a 9th-inning run that helped seal the Royals' 6–4 victory over the Orioles, their sixth consecutive win in the 2014 postseason. Cain ultimately ended up winning the ALCS Most Valuable Player Award (MVP) award for his efforts at the plate as well as in the field. He finished with a .533 batting average, eight hits, five runs, and numerous spectacular defensive plays which helped the Royals to sweep the Orioles and move on to the World Series.

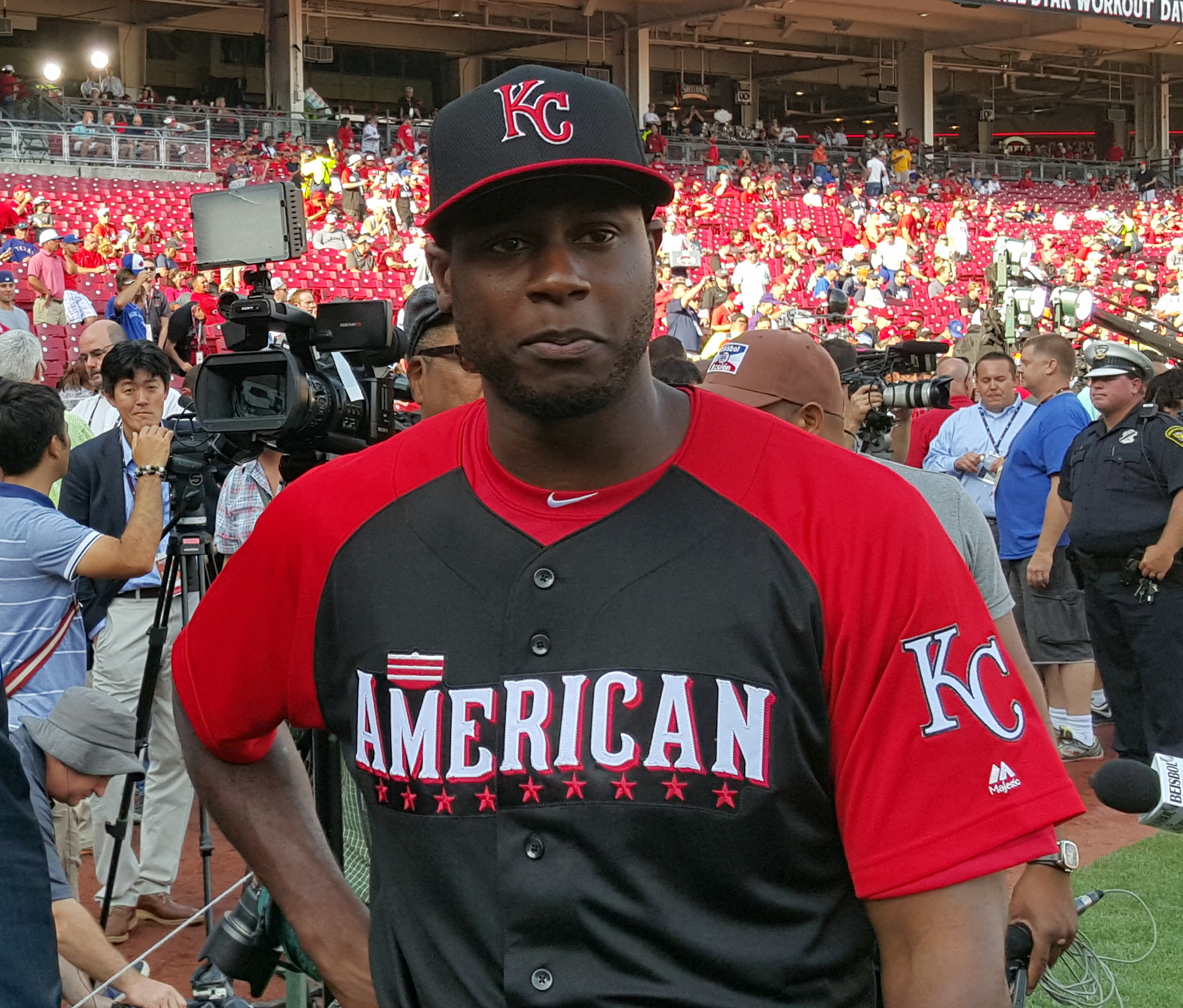
Cain at the 2015 All-Star Game

His defensive prowess continued in the World Series against the San Francisco Giants, where he made a catch at the wall in Game 1. Cain made two more spectacular diving catches in Game 3 to help preserve a 3–2 victory for the Royals. In the crucial Game 6, in which the Royals faced elimination, Cain went 2-for-3, with a single, double, and two walks, driving in three runs while making another running catch in Kansas City's 10–0 rout of the Giants to force a Game 7. However, the Giants won Game 7 and the World Series.

During a game against the Chicago White Sox on April 23, 2015, Cain was one of five players ejected for being involved in a bench-clearing brawl. On April 25, 2015, Cain was suspended 2 games. He had the option to appeal but dropped it on May 3, 2015, so the suspension would take effect. In 2015, Cain was named to his first All Star team and helped lead the Royals to the 2015 AL Central Division title. He finished the regular season with career highs in batting average (.307), home runs (16), runs scored (101), and RBIs (72). He also was 3rd in the league in power-speed number (20.4). Cain's three-RBI performance in game 5 of the World Series helped the Royals take a 7–2 win and clinch the championship over the New York Mets. Cain finished third in the voting for the 2015 American League Most Valuable Player, finishing behind winner Josh Donaldson and Mike Trout.

On July 29, 2017, Cain set a record for the shortest over-the-wall home run hit in the Statcast era. In Boston's Fenway Park, he hit a ball 302 feet down the right field line that hit the green padding at the base of the "Pesky Pole" for a home run.

=== Milwaukee Brewers (2018–2022) ===
Cain signed a five-year, $80 million contract to return to the Brewers on January 26, 2018. He was named to the 2018 MLB All-Star Game after batting .290 with eight home runs, 26 RBIs, and 15 stolen bases. Also that season, Cain finished seventh in NL MVP balloting, and played a lead role in the Brewers coming within one game of reaching the 2018 World Series, losing to the Dodgers in the 2018 National League Championship Series.

In 2019 he batted .260/.325/.372 with 11 home runs and 48 RBIs, with the highest opposite field percentage of all National League batters (32.4%). On defense, despite battling numerous injuries throughout the year, he had the best fielding percentage of all major league center fielders (.994) and was awarded the first Gold Glove of his career.

Cain played in five games in the abbreviated 2020 MLB season before he announced on August 1 that he was opting out of the remainder of the season due to the COVID-19 pandemic. Cain returned to play in the 2021 season but played in only 78 games due to a hamstring injury that sidelined him for all of June and nearly all of July. He batted .257/.329/.401 with eight home runs, 36 RBIs and 13 stolen bases.

After batting .179 in 43 games for Milwaukee in 2022, the Brewers designated Cain for assignment on June 18. He cleared release waivers on June 22 and became a free agent. The Brewers released Cain on the same day he reached 10 years of service in the MLB. This made him eligible for a full pension from the MLB.

Cain announced his retirement on March 7, 2023. On April 6, 2023, the Royals announced that Cain had signed a one-day contract with the team so he could retire as a Royal, with a celebration held prior to the Royals’ home game with the Oakland Athletics on May 6.

== Awards and honors ==
- 2015 World Series Champion
- 2018 All-Star
- 2015 All-Star
- 2019 Gold Glove Award Winner
- 2014 2014 American League Championship Series Most Valuable Player Award
- 2006 South Atlantic League (SAL) Post-Season All-Star
- 2006 SAL Mid-Season All-Star
- 2005 Topps Short-Season/Rookie All-Star
- 2005 Topps AZL Player of the Year
- 2005 Baseball America Rookie All-Star
- 2005 Arizona League (AZL) Most Valuable Player
- 2005 AZL Post-Season All-Star

== Personal life ==
Cain and his wife, Jenny, have three sons, born in October 2014, January 2016, and December 2017.
