= Wilking Rodríguez =

Venezuelan baseball player (born 1990)

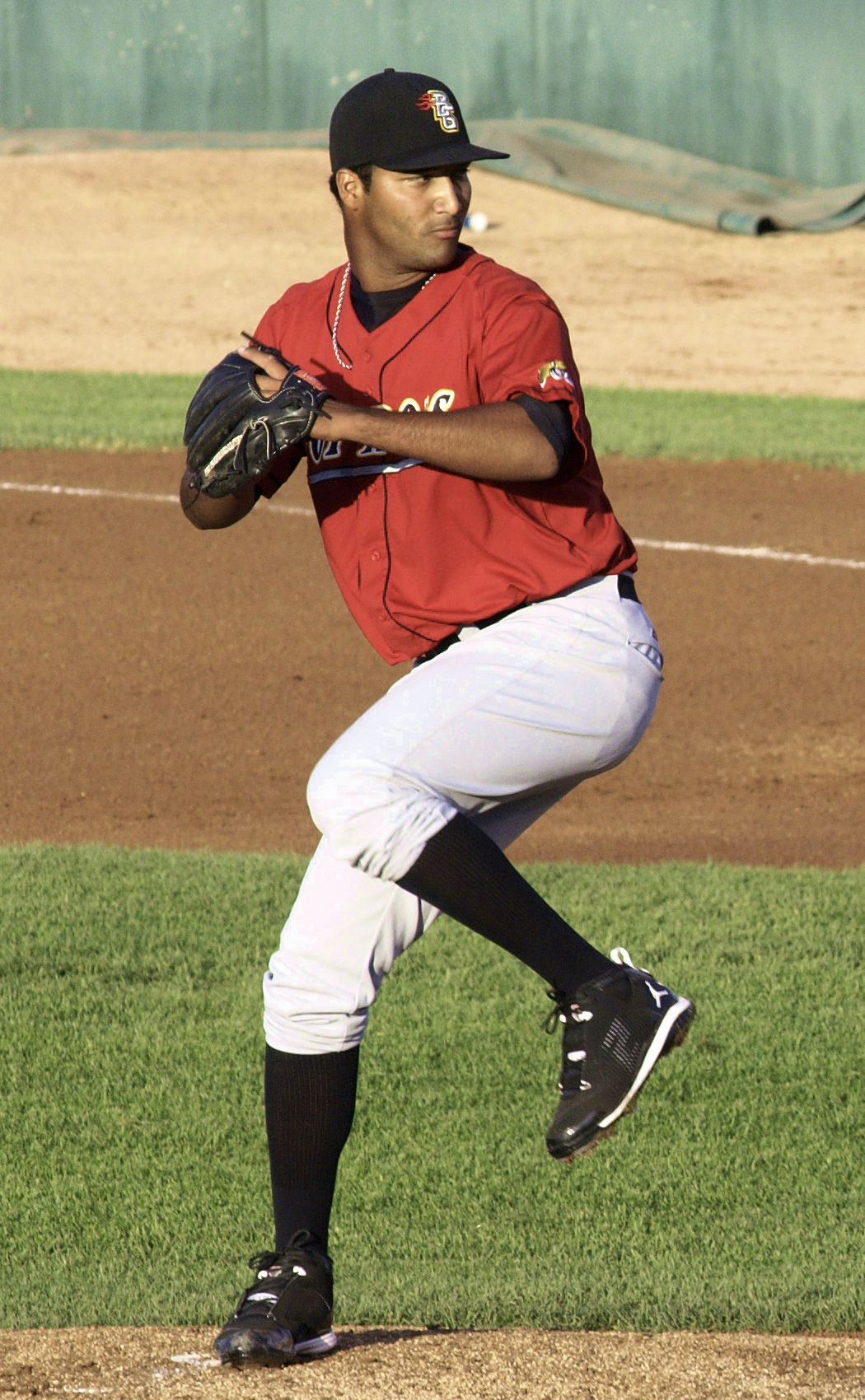
- Rodríguez with the Bowling Green Hot Rods in 2011

Tecolotes de los Dos Laredos – No. 75
- Pitcher
- Born: March 2, 1990 (age 36); Puerto Cabello, Venezuela
- Bats: Right Throws: Right

MLB debut
- June 3, 2014, for the Kansas City Royals

MLB statistics (through 2014 season)
- Win–loss record: 0–0
- Earned run average: 0.00
- Strikeouts: 1
- Stats at Baseball Reference

Teams
- Kansas City Royals (2014)

Wilking José Rodríguez Carrasco (born March 2, 1990) is a Venezuelan professional baseball pitcher for the Tecolotes de los Dos Laredos of the Mexican League. In 2007, Rodríguez signed with the Tampa Bay Rays as an international free agent. He has previously played in Major League Baseball (MLB) for the Kansas City Royals.

== Career ==
=== Tampa Bay Rays ===
On February 26, 2007, Rodríguez signed with the Tampa Bay Rays as an international free agent. Rodríguez made his professional debut in 2007 in the Venezuelan Summer League and posted a 1.95 ERA in 17 appearances. He returned to the Venezuelan Summer League Rays the following year and pitched to a 3.71 ERA in 10 games. In 2009, Rodríguez played for the rookie-level Princeton Rays and recorded a 1-6 record and 3.21 ERA in 13 starts with the team. Rodríguez spent the 2010 season with the Single-A Bowling Green Hot Rods, pitching to a 4-10 record and 4.23 ERA with 93 strikeouts in 106 1/3 innings of work. He split the 2011 season between Bowling Green and the Low-A Hudson Valley Renegades, accumulating a 1-4 record and 5.00 ERA in 11 appearances between the two teams.

On November 18, 2011, Rodríguez was added to the Rays' 40-man roster to protect him from the Rule 5 draft. Before the 2012 season, he ranked as the Rays' 20th best prospect, Rodríguez played for the High-A Charlotte Stone Crabs in 2012, logging an 0-4 record and 5.56 ERA in 7 starts. On October 20, 2012, Rodríguez was outrighted off of the 40-man roster. He played in 8 games for the rookie-level Gulf Coast League Rays in 2013, missing a portion of the year due to injury, and pitched 9 scoreless innings for the team. On November 4, 2013, Rodríguez elected free agency.

=== Kansas City Royals ===
On November 23, 2013, Rodríguez signed a minor league contract with the Kansas City Royals organization. He was assigned to the Double-A Northwest Arkansas Naturals to begin the 2014 season and later received a promotion to the Triple-A Omaha Storm Chasers.

On June 2, 2014, the Royals selected Rodríguez's contract from Triple-A, and promoted him to the major leagues for the first time. Rodríguez made 2 appearances for the Royals, pitching 2 scoreless innings, before he was optioned back down to Omaha. He was placed on release waivers by the Royals on August 11.

=== New York Yankees ===
On August 18, 2014, Rodríguez signed a minor league contract with the New York Yankees organization. He was invited to spring training with the Yankees for the 2015 season, but did not make the team and was assigned to the Triple-A Scranton/Wilkes-Barre RailRiders to begin the season. On April 15, 2015, Rodríguez was suspended 80 games for a PED violation. In seven appearances for Scranton, Rodríguez registered a 2-0 record and 1.69 ERA. He became a free agent on November 6, 2015.

=== Rieleros de Aguascalientes ===
On January 1, 2020, after spending the past 4 seasons out of affiliated ball, Rodríguez signed with the Rieleros de Aguascalientes of the Mexican League. Rodríguez did not play in a game in 2020 due to the cancellation of the Mexican League season because of the COVID-19 pandemic. On May 28, 2021, Rodríguez re-signed with Aguascalientes. Rodríguez recorded a 3.86 ERA in 13 appearances with the Rieleros.

=== Tecolotes de los Dos Laredos ===
On July 18, 2021, Rodríguez was signed off waivers by the Tecolotes de los Dos Laredos of the Mexican League. He made 12 appearances for Dos Laredos down the stretch, posting a 1-1 record and 3.77 ERA with 19 strikeouts in 14 1/3 innings pitched. In 2022, Rodríguez pitched in 46 games for the team, recording a 6-2 record and 2.01 ERA with 73 strikeouts and 17 saves in 44 2/3 innings of work.

=== St. Louis Cardinals ===
On August 30, 2022, Rodriguez signed a minor league deal with the New York Yankees. However, he did not appear in a game for the organization.

On December 7, 2022, the St. Louis Cardinals selected Rodríguez from the Yankees in the Rule 5 draft. During spring training, Rodríguez competed for a middle-relief role, and logged a 4.26 ERA and 6:3 K:BB over 6 1/3 innings pitched. On March 23, it was announced that he would begin the season on the injured list with right shoulder tightness. On May 3, it was announced that Rodríguez would miss 4–6 months after undergoing arthroscopic surgery on his right shoulder. Following the season on November 13, Rodríguez was removed from the 40–man roster and sent outright to the Triple–A Memphis Redbirds; he subsequently elected free agency.

On November 21, 2023, Rodríguez re–signed with the Cardinals on a minor league contract. In 13 games split between the Single–A Palm Beach Cardinals and Triple–A Memphis, he accumulated a 6.17 ERA with 17 strikeouts across 11 2/3 innings pitched. Rodríguez was released by the Cardinals organization on September 26, 2024.

=== New York Yankees (second stint) ===
On December 13, 2024, Rodríguez signed a minor league contract with the New York Yankees. He made 27 appearances for the Triple-A Scranton/Wilkes-Barre RailRiders in 2025, posting a 2-1 record and 3.20 ERA with 36 strikeouts across 25 1/3 innings pitched. Rodríguez elected free agency following the season on November 6, 2025.

=== Tecolotes de los Dos Laredos (second stint) ===
On January 12, 2026, Rodríguez signed with the Tecolotes de los Dos Laredos of the Mexican League.

== See also ==
- List of Major League Baseball players from Venezuela
- Rule 5 draft results
