= Terrance Gore =

American baseball player (1991–2026)

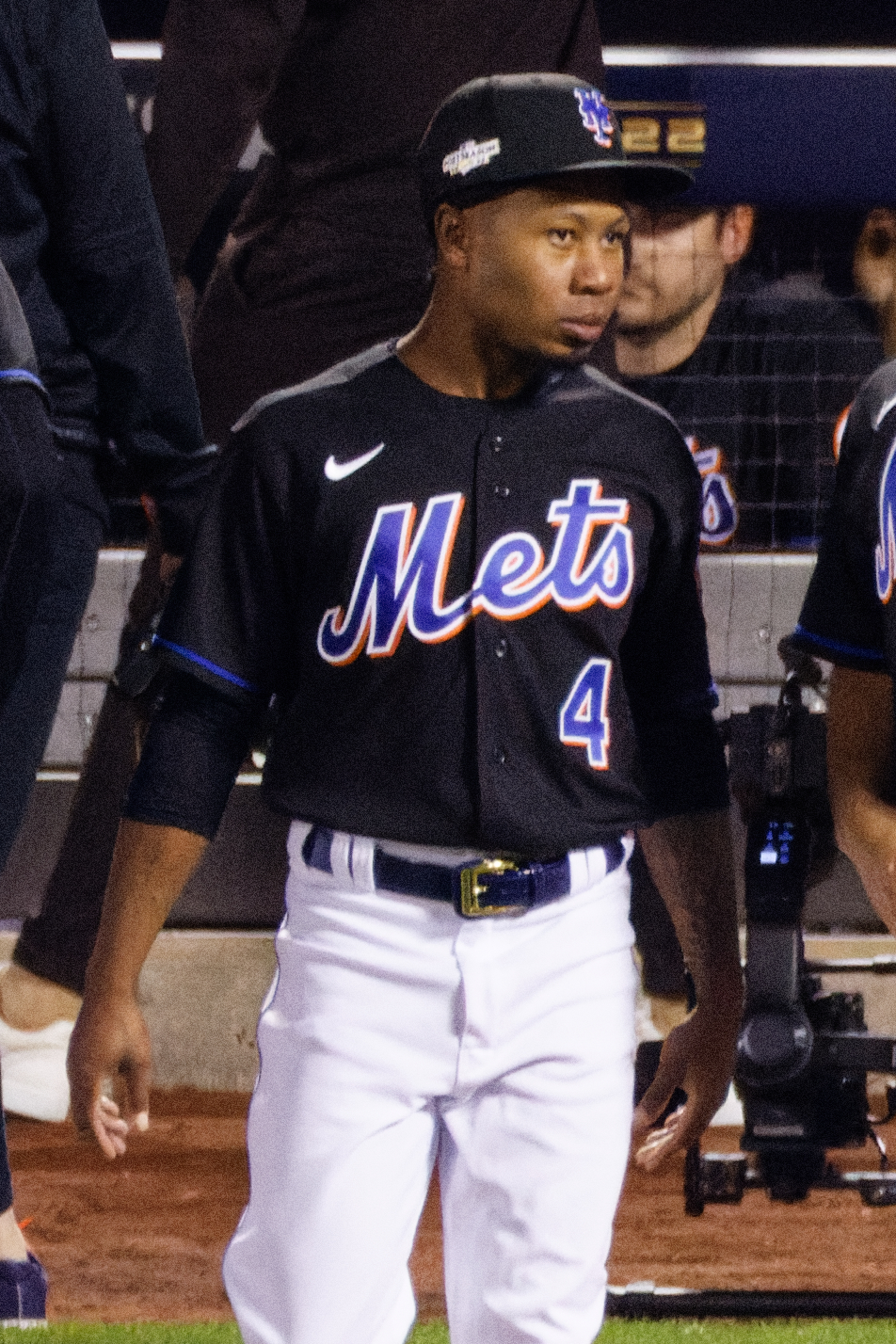
- Gore with the New York Mets in 2022
- Outfielder
- Born: June 8, 1991; Macon, Georgia, U.S.
- Died: February 6, 2026 (aged 34); Panama City, Florida, U.S.
- Batted: Right Threw: Right

MLB debut
- August 31, 2014, for the Kansas City Royals

Last MLB appearance
- October 5, 2022, for the New York Mets

MLB statistics
- Batting average: .216
- Runs batted in: 1
- Stolen bases: 43
- Stats at Baseball Reference

Teams
- Kansas City Royals (2014–2017); Chicago Cubs (2018); Kansas City Royals (2019); Los Angeles Dodgers (2020); Atlanta Braves (2021); New York Mets (2022)

Career highlights and awards
- World Series champion (2021)

Terrance Jamar Gore (June 8, 1991 – February 6, 2026) was an American professional baseball outfielder. He played college baseball at Gulf Coast Community College. He made his Major League Baseball (MLB) debut in 2014 with the Kansas City Royals and also played in MLB for the Chicago Cubs, Los Angeles Dodgers, Atlanta Braves, and New York Mets.

Gore was regarded as one of the fastest players in baseball and was mainly used as a pinch runner. Gore was frequently added to expanded rosters on contending teams late in the season and was on the postseason roster of a championship team three times—the Royals in 2015, the Dodgers in 2020, and the Braves in 2021.

== Amateur career ==
Born and raised in Macon, Georgia, Gore attended Jones County High School in Gray, Georgia, where he starred in baseball and football as a running back and wide receiver. During his senior year, Gore compiled over 1,000 rushing yards and averaged over nine yards per carry. During his four years playing baseball at the school, he stole 145 bases and hit .474 as a senior. Gore later attended Gulf Coast Community College in Panama City, Florida, turning down football scholarships from the University of Georgia and Georgia Tech. Gore spent one season at Gulf Coast, batting .330 with 51 steals in 54 attempts.

== Professional career ==
=== Kansas City Royals ===
The Kansas City Royals selected Gore in the 20th round of the 2011 Major League Baseball draft.

During the 2014 season, Gore expressed a desire to quit baseball to his agent, Jay Witasick, as he was about to raise a family and was not progressing professionally as much as he would have liked. Royals special assistant Mike Sweeney also advised Gore against retirement, and, in early August, Gore was duly promoted to the Omaha Storm Chasers to focus on pinch-running and stealing bases.

On August 31, 2014, Gore was promoted to the Royals. Gore became the 16th-known player in Major League Baseball history to wear No. 0. He was the second Royal to wear the number after George Scott Jr. He was used primarily as a designated pinch runner. He went 5-for-5 in stolen bases in the major leagues and played for the Royals during the 2014 MLB postseason.

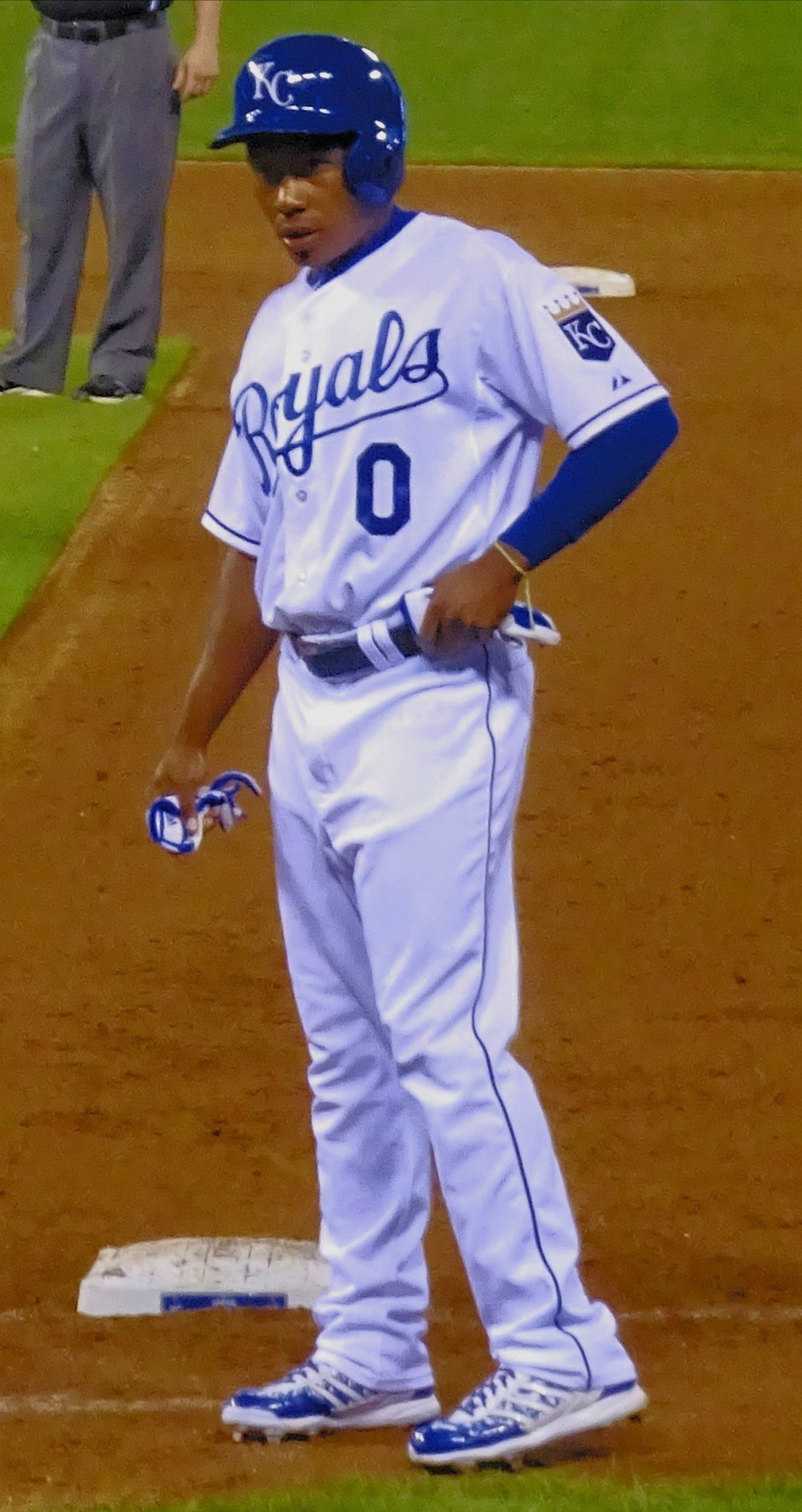
Gore pinch running for the Kansas City Royals in 2015

Gore appeared for the Royals in the 2015 MLB postseason, playing in the 2015 ALDS and 2015 ALCS. He was not on the roster for the World Series. Regardless, Gore received his first World Series ring. Gore made 17 appearances for the Royals in the 2016 season, going 0-for-3 with 11 stolen bases in 13 attempts.

Gore played in 12 games for Kansas City during the 2017 campaign, going 0-for-4 with two stolen bases and one walk. Gore was non-tendered by the Royals on December 1, 2017, and became a free agent. However, he subsequently re-signed with the organization on a minor league contract the following day.

=== Chicago Cubs ===
On August 15, 2018, Gore was traded to the Chicago Cubs in exchange for cash considerations, and assigned to the Triple-A Iowa Cubs. He was promoted to the major leagues on September 1. On September 8, he recorded his first major league hit in the first game of a double header against the Washington Nationals pitcher Max Scherzer. Gore elected free agency following the season on November 2.

=== Kansas City Royals (second stint) ===
On December 18, 2018, Gore signed a one-year contract to return to the Royals. He was designated for assignment on July 12, 2019, despite hitting .275 with 13 stolen bases.

=== New York Yankees ===
On July 17, 2019, Gore was traded to the New York Yankees in exchange for cash considerations. He was subsequently assigned to the Triple-A Scranton/Wilkes-Barre RailRiders, for which he batted .164/.324/.255 with one home run and three RBI. Gore elected free agency following the season on November 4.

=== Los Angeles Dodgers ===
On February 17, 2020, Gore signed a minor league contract with the Los Angeles Dodgers. On July 23, he was added to the Opening Day roster. Gore appeared in two games for the Dodgers, playing one inning as a defensive replacement in the outfield and also pinch running before he was designated for assignment on July 30.

The Dodgers added Gore to their 28-man roster for the 2020 Wild Card Series matchup against the Milwaukee Brewers. He did not appear in either of the two games in that series but remained on the roster for the second-round series against the San Diego Padres. Manager Dave Roberts said that Gore might not appear in the series "but if that situation presents itself, to not have him on the roster would be pretty costly, in my opinion." He did not play in any games in the postseason as he was left off the roster for the NLCS and the World Series. Despite being left off the NLCS and World Series rosters, Gore still received a ring following the Dodgers championship victory, the second in his career. On October 31, Gore was outrighted off the 40-man roster. He became a free agent on November 2.

=== Atlanta Braves ===
On February 25, 2021, Gore signed a minor league contract with the Atlanta Braves organization. Playing in 2021 for the Triple-A Gwinnett Stripers he batted .232/.361/.319 and stole 18 bases while being caught four times.

On October 8, 2021, Gore was announced as part of the Braves 26-man roster for the 2021 NLDS. In the series against the Milwaukee Brewers, he had one appearance as a pinch runner. He was removed from the National League Championship Series roster, and though he returned to the World Series roster, did not appear in any of the ensuing games. The Braves won the 2021 World Series, giving the Braves their first title since 1995, and Gore his second in a row, and third in seven years. On November 6, 2021, Gore was outrighted off of the 40-man roster and elected free agency the next day.

=== New York Mets ===
On June 6, 2022, Gore signed a minor league deal with the New York Mets organization. He was selected to the active roster on August 31. On November 10, he was removed from the 40-man roster and sent outright to the Triple-A Syracuse Mets; he elected free agency the same day.

== Personal life and death ==
Gore was married to Britney, with whom he raised three children. According to a social media post from his wife, Gore died due to complications following a routine surgical procedure on February 6, 2026, at the age of 34.
