= Jimmy Paredes =

Dominican baseball player (born 1988)

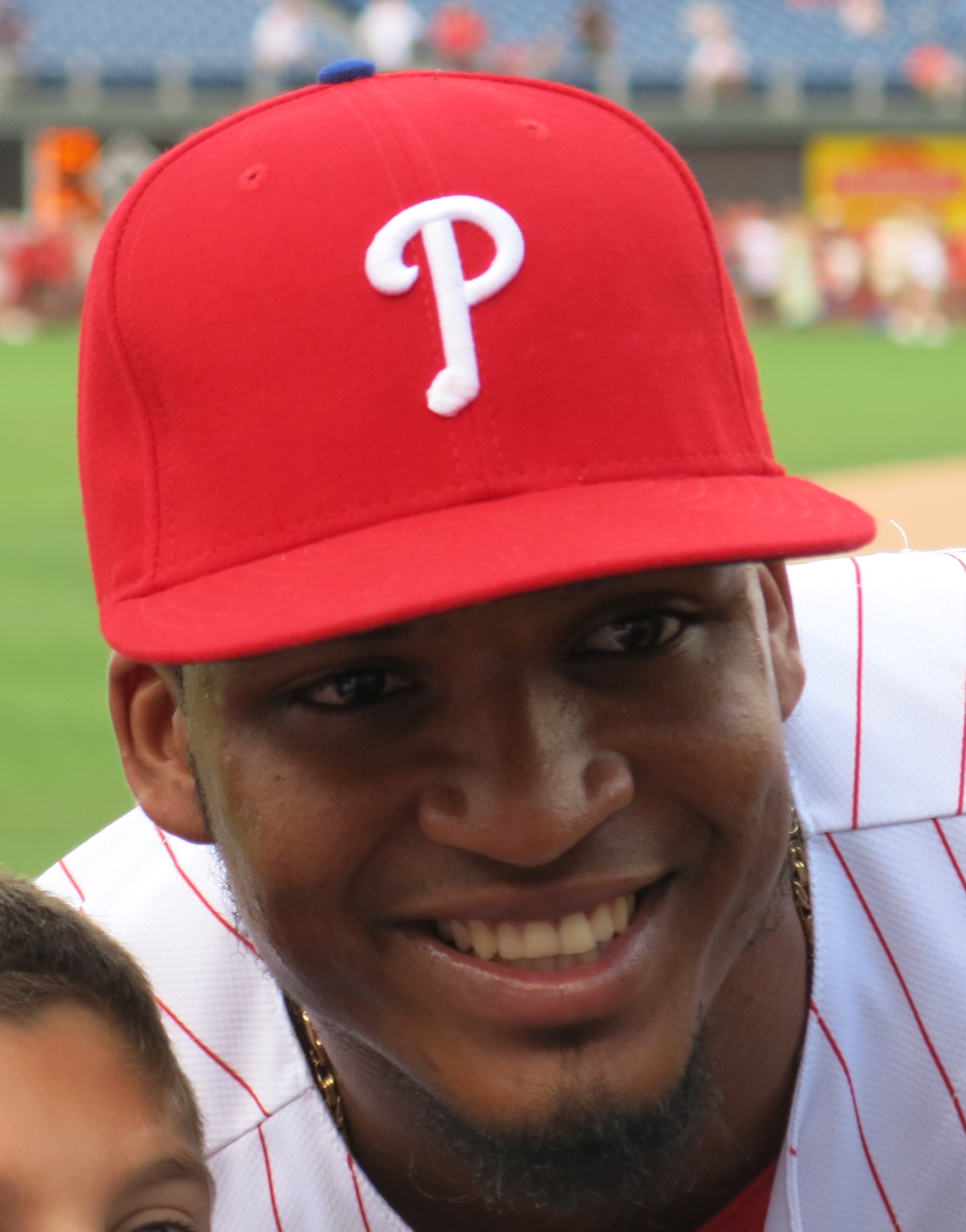
- Paredes with the Philadelphia Phillies in 2016

Leones del Escogido – No. 38
- Utility player
- Born: November 25, 1988 (age 37); Bajos de Haina, Dominican Republic
- Batted: Switch Threw: Right

Professional debut
- MLB: August 1, 2011, for the Houston Astros
- NPB: March 31, 2017, for the Chiba Lotte Marines
- KBO: March 24, 2018, for the Doosan Bears

Last appearance
- MLB: October 2, 2016, for the Philadelphia Phillies
- NPB: October 10, 2017, for the Chiba Lotte Marines
- KBO: May 24, 2018, for the Doosan Bears

MLB statistics (through 2016 season)
- Batting average: .251
- Home runs: 20
- Runs batted in: 100

NPB statistics (through 2017 season)
- Batting average: .214
- Home runs: 9
- Runs batted in: 22

KBO statistics (through 2018 season)
- Batting average: .138
- Home runs: 1
- Runs batted in: 4
- Stats at Baseball Reference

Teams
- Houston Astros (2011–2013); Kansas City Royals (2014); Baltimore Orioles (2014–2015); Toronto Blue Jays (2016); Philadelphia Phillies (2016); Chiba Lotte Marines (2017); Doosan Bears (2018)

Jimmy Santiago Paredes Terrero (born November 25, 1988), is a Dominican professional baseball utility player who captains the Leones del Escogido of the Dominican Professional Baseball League. He played in Major League Baseball (MLB) for the Houston Astros, Kansas City Royals, Baltimore Orioles, Toronto Blue Jays, and Philadelphia Phillies, in Nippon Professional Baseball (NPB) for the Chiba Lotte Marines, and in the KBO League for the Doosan Bears.

== Baseball career ==
=== New York Yankees ===
On July 2, 2006, Paredes was signed as an amateur free agent by the New York Yankees. He made his professional debut in 2007 with the Dominican Summer Yankees 1. He came to America for the 2008 season and played with the Gulf Coast League Yankees, hitting .280/.328/.379 with one home run, 15 RBI, and six stolen bases across 47 games. He played 2009 with the Staten Island Yankees of the Low–A New York–Penn League, where he was an All-Star, batting .302 with 23 steals in 54 games. He started 2010 with the Charleston RiverDogs of the Single–A South Atlantic League (SAL).

=== Houston Astros ===
On July 31, 2010, at the trade deadline, the Yankees traded Paredes with Mark Melancon to the Houston Astros in exchange for Lance Berkman. The Astros subsequently assigned Paredes to the Single–A Lexington Legends of the SAL.

On November 19, 2010, the Astros added Paredes to their 40-man roster to protect him from the Rule 5 draft. He signed a one-year, $414,000 deal before the season started. He started the 2011 season with the Corpus Christi Hooks of the Double–A Texas League, where he was an All-Star, splitting time at second and third base, batting .271 with 29 steals and 41 runs batted in (RBIs).

On August 1, 2011, the Astros promoted Paredes to the major leagues for the first time to play third base, replacing the struggling Chris Johnson. In his first major league at bat, Paredes hit a two-run triple, becoming the first player in franchise history to triple in his first major league plate appearance.

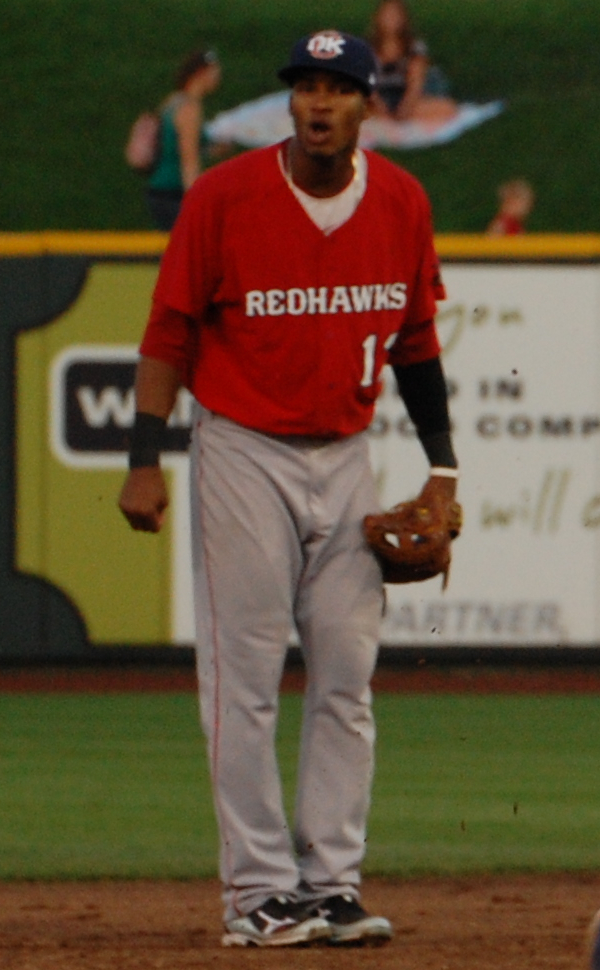
Paredes with the Oklahoma City RedHawks in 2012

In 2012, he played in 24 games for the Astros, and batted .189/.244/.230 with three RBI and two stolen bases. The following season, Paredes made 48 appearances for Houston, hitting .192/.231/.248 with one home run, 10 RBI, and four stolen bases.

=== Kansas City Royals ===
After the 2013 season, the Astros removed Paredes from their 40-man roster, placing him on waivers. He was claimed by the Miami Marlins on November 4, 2013. He was designated for assignment on February 7, 2014.

On February 15, Paredes was claimed off waivers by the Baltimore Orioles. On February 17, he was claimed off waivers by the Kansas City Royals. On May 28, while playing for the Triple-A Omaha Storm Chasers, Paredes had an 8-RBI game in which he hit for the cycle. In 65 games for Omaha, he hit .305/.332/.457 with five home runs, 36 RBI, and 17 stolen bases. The Royals designated Paredes for assignment on July 16, after trading for Jason Frasor.

=== Baltimore Orioles ===
Paredes was claimed off waivers by the Baltimore Orioles on July 24, 2014. On September 12, Paredes hit his first career walk off hit, a double off of New York Yankees pitcher Adam Warren in a 2–1 victory.

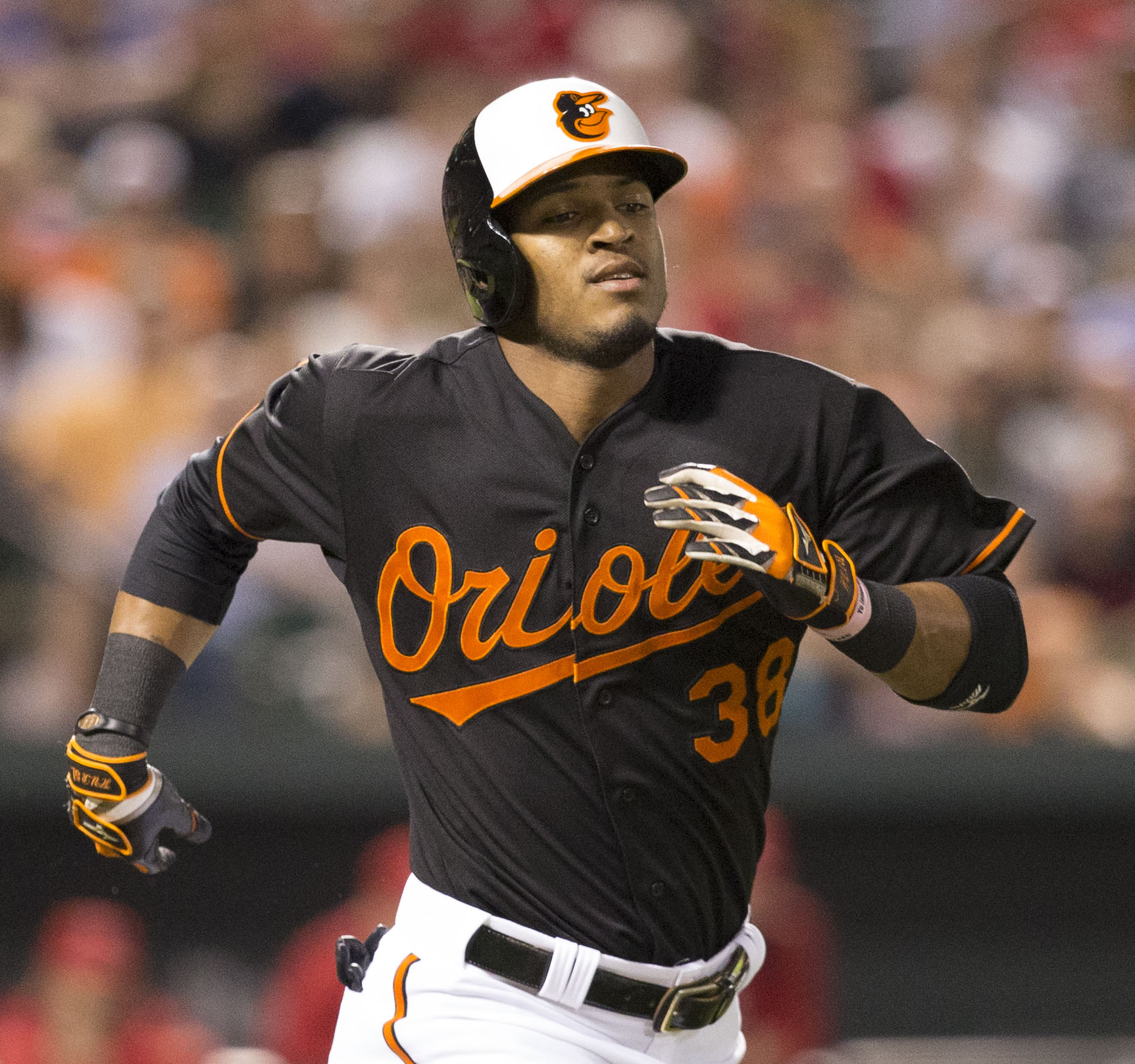
Paredes with the Baltimore Orioles in 2015

Paredes was not seen as a top contender for the Orioles' 25-man roster going into the 2015 season. However, Paredes had an extremely impressive spring training, batting .364/.368/.636 with seven doubles, a triple, two homers and 12 RBI. After a short stint on the disabled list to start the season, Paredes was activated to the Orioles' roster on April 18, 2015.

Through July 20, 2015, Paredes hit .294/.326/.463, with ten home runs and 39 RBI. Despite his hot start, Paredes cooled off dramatically during the final months of the season, and he hit .275/.310/.416, with ten home runs, 42 RBI, 17 doubles, 2 triples, 46 runs scored, and he collected exactly 100 hits. Paredes primarily played DH during the 2015 campaign, playing 81 games at the position, 11 as a pinch-hitter, eight as a third baseman, six at second base, two in right field, and one game as a pinch-runner and left fielder.

=== Toronto Blue Jays ===
On May 16, 2016, Paredes was claimed off waivers by the Toronto Blue Jays. He was designated for assignment on May 30. He played in 7 games for the Blue Jays, and hit .267 with one home run and two RBI.

=== Philadelphia Phillies ===
On June 1, 2016, Paredes was traded to the Philadelphia Phillies for cash considerations or a player to be named later. In 76 appearances for Philadelphia, he batted .217/.242/.350 with four home runs and 17 RBI. On October 7, Paredes was removed from the 40-man roster and sent outright to the Triple-A Lehigh Valley IronPigs. He elected free agency on October 10.

=== Chiba Lotte Marines ===
On January 5, 2017, Paredes signed a one-year, $1.2 million contract with the Chiba Lotte Marines of Nippon Professional Baseball. In 89 appearances for Lotte, Paredes batted .219/.270/.364 with 10 home runs and 26 RBI.

=== Doosan Bears ===
Paredes signed a one-year, $800,000 contract with the Doosan Bears on December 1, 2017. In 21 games for Doosan, he slashed .139/.197/.246 with one home run, four RBI, and one stolen base. Paredes was released by the Bears on June 1, 2018.

=== Lancaster Barnstormers ===
On July 23, 2018, Paredes signed with the Lancaster Barnstormers of the Atlantic League of Professional Baseball. In 21 games for Lancaster, Paredes hit .363/.395/.513 with three home runs, 14 RBI, and one stolen base.

=== Somerset Patriots ===
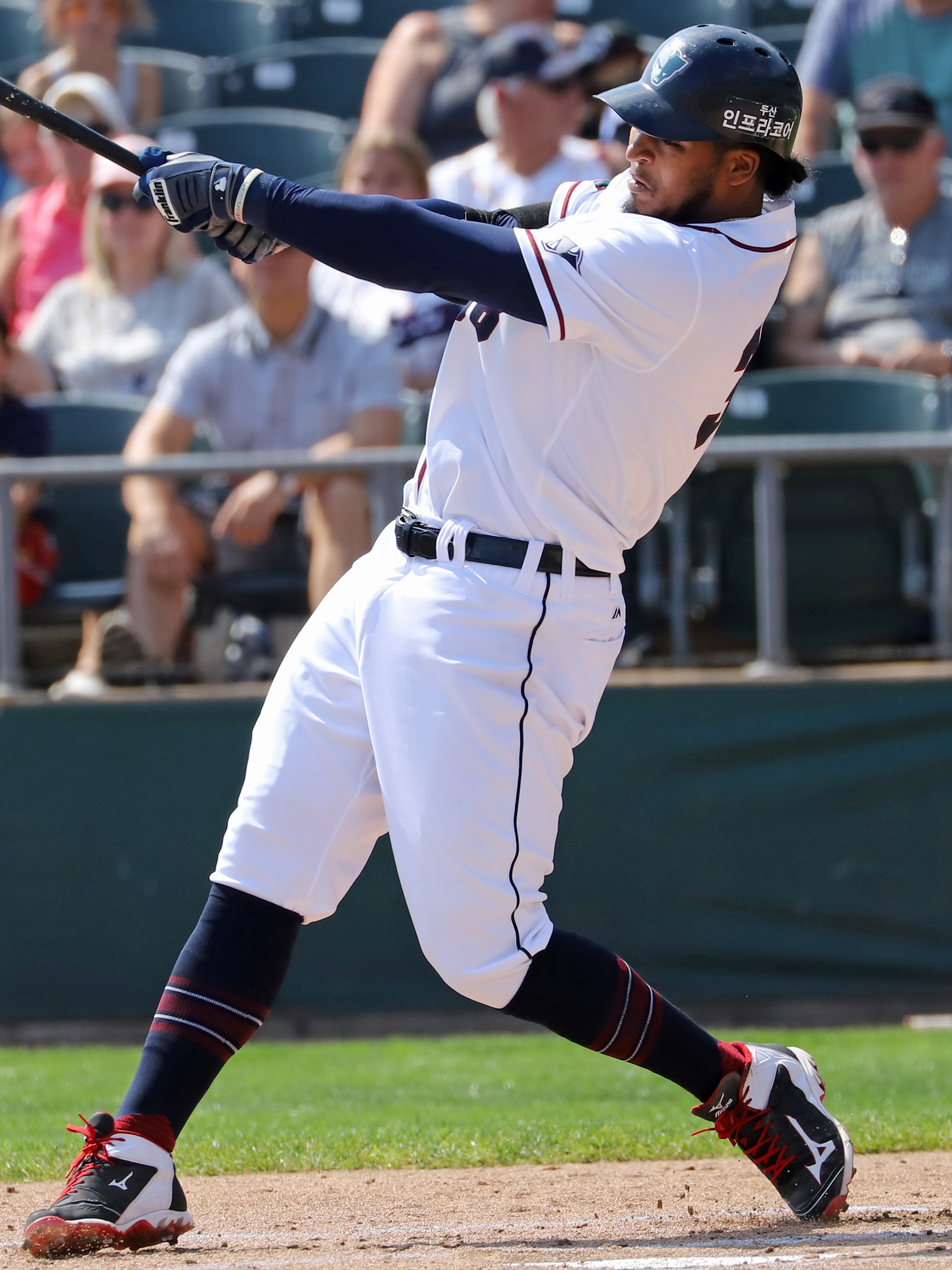
Jimmy Paredes with the Somerset Patriots. September 22, 2019. TD Bank Park, Bridgewater, NJ. Note the logo on the left side of the batting helmet from his time with the Doosan Bears.

On March 19, 2019, Paredes was traded to the Somerset Patriots of the Atlantic League of Professional Baseball. In 63 games for the Patriots, he batted .265/.303/.470 with 13 home runs, 45 RBI, and six stolen bases. Paredes re-signed with the club for the 2020 season, which was later canceled due to the COVID-19 pandemic.

=== West Virginia Power ===
On March 5, 2021, Paredes signed with the West Virginia Power of the Atlantic League of Professional Baseball. In 32 games for the Power, Paredes slashed .317/.433/.529 with 5 home runs and 20 RBI before being released on July 9.

=== Toros de Tijuana ===
On July 18, 2021, Paredes signed with the Toros de Tijuana of the Mexican League. In 12 games for Tijuana, he slashed .340/.389/.520 with two home runs and four RBI before being released on August 11.

=== West Virginia Power (second stint) ===
On August 19, 2021, Paredes re-signed with the West Virginia Power of the Atlantic League of Professional Baseball. In 79 total games for West Virginia, he slashed .308/.381/.563 with 17 home runs and 68 RBI. Paredes became a free agent following the season.

=== Wild Health Genomes ===
On February 7, 2022, Paredes signed with the Wild Health Genomes of the Atlantic League of Professional Baseball. Paredes appeared in 106 games for the Genomes, hitting .283/.345/.493 with 18 home runs and 68 RBI. He became a free agent following the season.

=== Spire City Ghost Hounds ===
On February 27, 2023, Paredes signed with the Spire City Ghost Hounds of the Atlantic League of Professional Baseball. In 73 games for Spire City, he batted .259/.306/.485 with 18 home runs, 50 RBI, and 5 stolen bases. On September 9, Paredes was released by the Ghost Hounds.

=== Staten Island FerryHawks ===
On April 9, 2024, Paredes signed with the Staten Island FerryHawks of the Atlantic League of Professional Baseball. In 4 games for Staten Island, he went 3–for–13 (.231) with no home runs or RBI. Paredes became a free agent following the season.
