= 2014 Chicago White Sox season =

2014 Chicago White Sox
- League: American League
- Division: Central
- Ballpark: U.S. Cellular Field
- City: Chicago
- Record: 73–89 (.451)
- Divisional place: 4th
- Owners: Jerry Reinsdorf
- General managers: Rick Hahn
- Managers: Robin Ventura
- Television: CSN Chicago; CSN+ WGN-TV and WGN America; WCIU-TV (Ken Harrelson, Steve Stone)
- Radio: WSCR; Chicago White Sox Radio Network (Ed Farmer, Darrin Jackson); WNUA HD-2 (Spanish) (Hector Molina, Billy Russo)

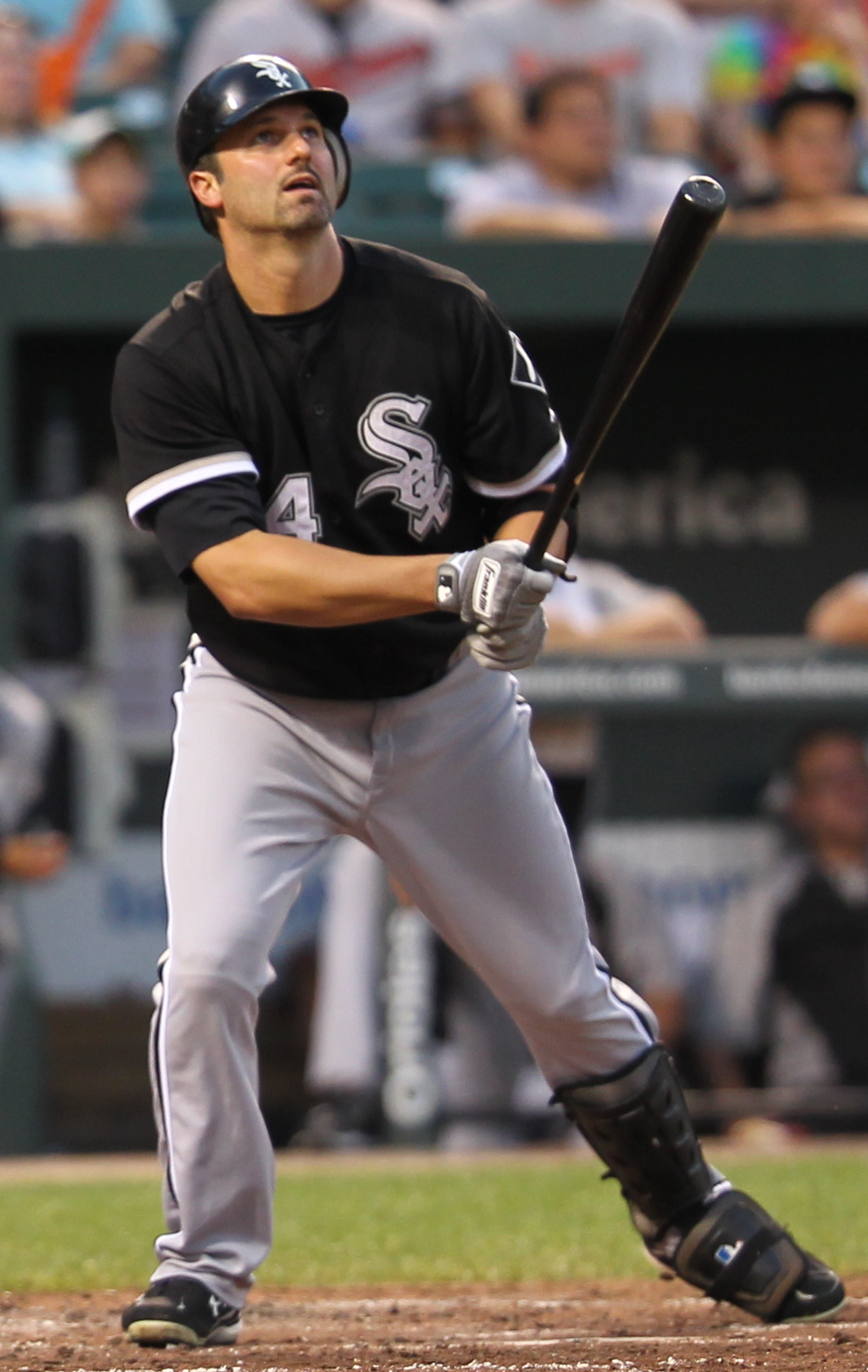
Paul Konerko, 2011

The 2014 Chicago White Sox season was the club's 115th season in Chicago and 114th in the American League. They finished in fourth place in the American League Central, 17 games behind the first place Tigers.

== Regular season ==
=== Season standings ===
==== American League Central ====
AL Central
Team	W	L	Pct.	GB	Home	Road
Detroit Tigers	90	72	.556	—	45‍–‍36	45‍–‍36
Kansas City Royals	89	73	.549	1	42‍–‍39	47‍–‍34
Cleveland Indians	85	77	.525	5	48‍–‍33	37‍–‍44
Chicago White Sox	73	89	.451	17	40‍–‍41	33‍–‍48
Minnesota Twins	70	92	.432	20	35‍–‍46	35‍–‍46

==== American League Wild Card ====
Division leaders
Team	W	L	Pct.
Los Angeles Angels of Anaheim	98	64	.605
Baltimore Orioles	96	66	.593
Detroit Tigers	90	72	.556

Wild Card teams (Top 2 teams qualify for postseason)
Team	W	L	Pct.	GB
Kansas City Royals	89	73	.549	+1
Oakland Athletics	88	74	.543	—
Seattle Mariners	87	75	.537	1
Cleveland Indians	85	77	.525	3
New York Yankees	84	78	.519	4
Toronto Blue Jays	83	79	.512	5
Tampa Bay Rays	77	85	.475	11
Chicago White Sox	73	89	.451	15
Boston Red Sox	71	91	.438	17
Houston Astros	70	92	.432	18
Minnesota Twins	70	92	.432	18
Texas Rangers	67	95	.414	21

=== Record vs. opponents ===
2014 American League record Source: MLB Standings Grid – 2014
Team	BAL	BOS	CWS	CLE	DET	HOU	KC	LAA	MIN	NYY	OAK	SEA	TB	TEX	TOR	NL
Baltimore	—	11–8	5–1	3–4	1–5	4–3	3–4	4–2	4–3	13–6	2–4	5–2	12–7	6–1	11–8	12–8
Boston	8–11	—	4–3	2–5	1–5	4–3	6–1	2–5	4–2	7–12	3–4	1–5	9–10	4–2	7–12	9–11
Chicago	1–5	3–4	—	9–10	9–10	3–3	6–13	1–5	9–10	2–5	4–3	3–4	5–2	2–4	5–2	11–9
Cleveland	4–3	5–2	10–9	—	8–11	5–2	10–9	2–5	11–8	4–3	2–4	2–4	4–2	6–1	2–4	10–10
Detroit	5–1	5–1	10–9	11–8	—	4–3	13–6	3–4	9–10	3–4	5–2	2–4	3–4	4–3	1–5	12–8
Houston	3–4	3–4	3–3	2–5	3–4	—	3–3	7–12	3–3	4–2	8–11	9–10	2–5	11–8	4–3	5–15
Kansas City	4–3	1–6	13–6	9–10	6–13	3–3	—	3–3	11–8	4–3	5–2	2–5	4–2	5–1	4–3	15–5
Los Angeles	2–4	5–2	5–1	5–2	4–3	12–7	3–3	—	7–0	2–4	10–9	7–12	5–2	14–5	5–2	12–8
Minnesota	3–4	2–4	10–9	8–11	10–9	3–3	8–11	0–7	—	3–4	1–6	5–2	2–4	2–5	4–2	9–11
New York	6–13	12–7	5–2	3–4	4–3	2–4	3–4	4–2	4–3	—	2–4	3–3	8–11	4–3	11–8	13–7
Oakland	4–2	4–3	3–4	4–2	2–5	11–8	2–5	9–10	6–1	4–2	—	9–10	4–2	9–10	4–3	13–7
Seattle	2–5	5–1	4–3	4–2	4–2	10–9	5–2	12–7	2–5	3–3	10–9	—	4–3	9–10	4–3	9–11
Tampa Bay	7–12	10–9	2–5	2–4	4–3	5–2	2–4	2–5	4–2	11–8	2–4	3–4	—	5–2	8–11	10–10
Texas	1–6	2–4	4–2	1–6	3–4	8–11	1–5	5–14	5–2	3–4	10–9	10–9	2–5	—	2–4	10–10
Toronto	8–11	12–7	2–5	4–2	5–1	3–4	3–4	2–5	2–4	8–11	3–4	3–4	11–8	4–2	—	13–7

==== Detailed records and runs scored/allowed ====
Opponent	Home	Away	Total	Pct.	Runs scored	Runs allowed
AL East
Baltimore Orioles	0–3	1–2	1–5	.167	18	30
Boston Red Sox	1–2	2–2	3–4	.429	26	22
New York Yankees	2–2	0–3	2–5	.286	23	34
Tampa Bay Rays	3–1	2–1	5–2	.714	40	26
Toronto Blue Jays	2–1	3–1	5–2	.714	44	30
	8–9	8–9	16–18	.471	141	142
AL Central
Cleveland Indians	7–3	2–7	9–10	.474	71	78
Detroit Tigers	4–5	5–5	9–10	.474	80	85
Kansas City Royals	2–8	4–5	6–13	.316	64	93
Minnesota Twins	5–4	4–6	9–10	.474	70	89
	18–20	15–23	33–43	.434	305	345
AL West
Houston Astros	2–1	1–2	3–3	.500	28	32
Los Angeles Angels	1–2	0–3	1–5	.167	23	35
Oakland Athletics	3–1	1–2	4–3	.571	18	34
Seattle Mariners	2–1	1–3	3–4	.429	18	26
Texas Rangers	1–2	1–2	2–4	.333	25	42
	9–7	4–12	13–19	.406	112	169
Interleague
Chicago Cubs	1–1	2–0	3–1	.750	21	17
Arizona Diamondbacks	1–2	0–0	1–2	.333	13	12
Los Angeles Dodgers	0–0	2–1	2–1	.667	8	7
San Francisco Giants	2–0	1–1	3–1	.750	19	17
San Diego Padres	1–2	0–0	1–2	.333	7	9
Colorado Rockies	0–0	1–2	1–2	.333	20	21
	5–5	6–4	11–9	.550	67	66

== Game log ==
Legend
	White Sox win
	White Sox loss
	Postponement
**Bold**	White Sox team member

2014 White Sox game log (73–89)
March/April (14–15) – Home (9–7) – Road (5–8) – 154 R.S. 150 R.A.

#	Date	Opponent	Time	Score	Win	Loss	Save	Record	Length	Attendance	Boxscore
1	March 31	Twins	3:10 pm	5–3	**Sale** (1–0)	Nolasco (0–1)	**Lindstrom** (1)	1–0	2:35	**37,422**	W1
2	April 2	Twins	1:10 pm	7–6 (11)	**Belisario** (1–0)	Deduno (0–1)	—	2–0	4:19	**10,625**	W2
3	April 3	Twins	1:10 pm	9–10	Thielbar (1–0)	**Lindstrom** (0–1)	Perkins (1)	2–1	3:42	**11,056**	L1
4	April 4	@ Royals	3:10 pm	5–7	Guthrie (1–0)	**Johnson** (0–1)	Holland (1)	2–2	3:37	40,103	L2
5	April 5	@ Royals	1:10 pm	3–4	Davis (1–1)	**Downs** (0–1)	Holland (2)	2–3	2:59	21,463	L3
6	April 6	@ Royals	1:10 pm	5–1	**Sale** (2–0)	Shields (0–1)	—	3–3	2:49	29,760	W1
7	April 7	@ Rockies	7:40 pm	1–8	Lyles (2–0)	**Paulino** (0–1)	—	3–4	2:42	22,550	L1
8	April 8	@ Rockies	7:40 pm	15–3	**Quintana** (1–0)	Morales (0–1)	—	4–4	3:10	25,393	W1
9	April 9	@ Rockies	2:10 pm	4–10	Brothers (1–0)	**Downs** (0–2)	—	4–5	3:23	22,745	L1
10	April 10	Indians	7:10 pm	7–3	**Danks** (1–0)	Salazar (0–1)	—	5–5	2:52	**11,116**	W1
11	April 11	Indians	7:10 pm	9–6	**Sale** (3–0)	Carrasco (0–2)	—	6–5	3:28	**13,605**	W2
12	April 12	Indians	1:10 pm	6–12	Outman (2–0)	**Belisario** (1–1)	—	6–6	3:28	**27,332**	L1
13	April 13	Indians	1:10 pm	4–3	**Lindstrom** (1–1)	Axford (0–1)	—	7–6	3:18	**14,281**	W1
14	April 15	Red Sox	7:10 pm	2–1	**Webb** (1–0)	Badenhop (0–2)	—	8–6	3:36	**13,402**	W2
15	April 16	Red Sox	7:10 pm	4–6 (14)	Capuano (1–0)	**Garcia** (0–1)	Badenhop (1)	8–7	5:17	**13,302**	L1
16	April 17	Red Sox	7:10 pm	1–3	Lester (2–2)	**Belisario** (1–2)	Uehara (3)	8–8	2:54	**17,454**	L2
17	April 18	@ Rangers	7:05 pm	0–12	Pérez (3–0)	**Paulino** (0–2)	—	8–9	2:41	40,671	L3
18	April 19	@ Rangers	7:05 pm	3–6	Lewis (1–1)	**Quintana** (1–1)	Soria (3)	8–10	2:49	44,811	L4
19	April 20	@ Rangers	2:05 pm	16–2	**Johnson** (1–1)	Ross (1–1)	—	9–10	3:16	35,402	W1
20	April 21	@ Tigers	6:08 pm	3–1	**Danks** (2–0)	Sánchez (0–2)	**Lindstrom** (2)	10–10	3:06	24,997	W2
21	April 22	@ Tigers	6:08 pm	6–8	Verlander (3–1)	**Leesman** (0–1)	Chamberlain (1)	10–11	3:22	24,976	L1
22	April 23	@ Tigers	6:08 pm	6–4	**Rienzo** (1–0)	Reed (0–1)	**Lindstrom** (3)	11–11	2:51	23,451	W1
23	April 24	@ Tigers	12:08 pm	4–7	Szherzer (2–1)	**Quintana** (1–2)	Nathan (4)	11–12	3:14	28,514	L1
24	April 25	Rays	7:10 pm	9–6	**Lindstrom** (2–1)	Balfour (0–1)	—	12–12	4:04	**17,210**	W1
25	April 26	Rays	6:10 pm	0–4	Ramos (1–1)	**Danks** (2–1)	—	12–13	3:11	**22,412**	L1
26	April 27	Rays	1:10 pm	9–2	**Carroll** (1–0)	Price (3–2)	—	13–13	2:55	**17,313**	W1
27	April 28	Rays	7:10 pm	7–3	**Rienzo** (2–0)	Odorizzi (1–3)	—	14–13	3:19	**11,268**	W2
28	April 29	Tigers	7:10 pm	3–4	Chamberlain (1–1)	**Belisario** (1–3)	Nathan (5)	14–14	3:04	**17,023**	L1
29	April 30	Tigers	1:10 pm	1–5	Scherzer (3–1)	**Noesí** (0–2)	—	14–15	3:03	**15,157**	L2

May (14–14) – Home (7–7) – Road (7–7) – 107 R.S. 126 R.A.

#	Date	Opponent	Time	Score	Win	Loss	Save	Record	Length	Location/Attendance	Boxscore
30	May 2	@ Indians	6:05 pm	5–12	Salazar (1–3)	**Danks** (2–2)	—	14–16	3:26	15,518	L3
31	May 3	@ Indians	5:05 pm	0–2	Masterson (1–1)	**Carroll** (1–1)	Axford (9)	14–17	2:36	15,834	L4
32	May 4	@ Indians	12:05 pm	4–3	**Webb** (2–0)	Axford (0–2)	**Lindstrom** (4)	15–17	2:55	13,455	W1
33	May 5	@ Cubs	7:05 pm	3–1 (12)	**Webb** (3–0)	Grimm (1–1)	**Lindstrom** (5)	16–17	3:51	33,146	W2
34	May 6	@ Cubs	7:05 pm	5–1	**Putnam** (1–0)	Ramirez (0–1)	—	17–17	3:30	34,305	W3
35	May 7	Cubs	7:10 pm	8–3	**Danks** (3–2)	Wood (2–4)	—	18–17	3:03	**21,075**	W4
36	May 8	Cubs	7:10 pm	5–12	Schlitter (2–0)	**Carroll** (1–2)	—	18–18	4:07	**26,332**	L1
37	May 9	Diamondbacks	7:10 pm	9–3	**Rienzo** (3–0)	McCarthy (1–6)	—	19–18	2:45	**19,118**	W1
38	May 10	Diamondbacks	6:10 pm	3–4	Miley (3–3)	**Quintana** (1–3)	Reed (11)	19–19	2:58	**24,634**	L1
39	May 11	Diamondbacks	1:10 pm	1–5	Anderson (1–0)	**Noesí** (0–3)	—	19–20	3:10	**18,612**	L2
40	May 12	@ Athletics	9:05 pm	4–5	Chavez (3–1)	**Danks** (3–3)	Doolittle (2)	19–21	2:57	10,120	L3
41	May 13	@ Athletics	9:05 pm	0–11	Pomeranz (3–1)	**Carroll** (1–3)	—	19–22	2:50	13,826	L4
42	May 14	@ Athletics	2:35 pm	4–2	**Belisario** (2–3)	Abad (0–1)	**Lindstrom** (6)	20–22	2:57	18,035	W1
43	May 16	@ Astros	7:10 pm	7–2	**Quintana** (2–3)	McHugh (2–2)	—	21–22	3:31	17,529	W2
44	May 17	@ Astros	3:10 pm	5–6	Cosart (3–3)	**Noesí** (0–4)	Qualls (3)	21–23	3:26	20,612	L1
45	May 18	@ Astros	1:10 pm	2–8	Peacock (1–4)	**Danks** (3–4)	—	21–24	2:36	21,532	L2
46	May 19	@ Royals	7:10 pm	7–6	**Putnam** (2–0)	Vargas (4–2)	**Petricka** (1)	22–24	3:16	16,462	W1
47	May 20	@ Royals	7:10 pm	7–6	**Rienzo** (4–0)	Ventura (2–4)	**Belisario** (1)	23–24	3:19	14,900	W2
48	May 21	@ Royals	7:10 pm	1–3	Davis (3–1)	**Quintana** (2–4)	Holland (13)	23–25	2:41	17,576	L1
49	May 22	Yankees	7:10 pm	3–2	**Sale** (4–0)	Phelps (1–1)	**Belisario** (2)	24–25	2:45	**21,677**	W1
50	May 23	Yankees	7:10 pm	6–5	**Webb** (4–0)	Robertson (0–1)	—	25–25	3:52	**27,091**	W2
51	May 24	Yankees	1:10 pm	3–4 (10)	Betances (3–0)	**Putnam** (2–1)	Robertson (10)	25–26	2:56	**33,413**	L1
52	May 25	Yankees	1:10 pm	1–7	Tanaka (7–1)	**Rienzo** (4–1)	—	25–27	3:17	**39,142**	L2
53	May 26	Indians	1:10 pm	6–2	**Quintana** (3–4)	Tomlin (3–2)	**Downs** (1)	26–27	3:22	**17,075**	W1
54	May 27	Indians	7:10 pm	2–1	**Carroll** (2–3)	Masterson (2–4)	**Belisario** (3)	27–27	3:05	**14,237**	W2
55	May 28	Indians	7:10 pm	3–2	**Belisario** (3–3)	Shaw (1–1)	—	28–27	2:46	14,228	W3
56	May 30	Padres	7:10 pm	1–4	Kennedy (4–6)	**Danks** (3–5)	Street (16)	28–28	2:51	**25,342**	L1
57	May 31	Padres	1:10 pm	2–4	Ross (6–4)	**Rienzo** (4–2)	Street (17)	28–29	3:16	**19,025**	L2

June (11–15) – Home (5–4) – Road (6–11) – 97 R.S. 113 R.A.

#	Date	Opponent	Time	Score	Win	Loss	Save	Record	Length	Location/Attendance	Boxscore
58	June 1	Padres	1:10 pm	4–1	**Sale** (5–0)	Stults (2–6)	—	29–29	2:08	**23,185**	W1
59	June 2	@ Dodgers	9:10 pm	2–5	Kershaw (4–2)	**Quintana** (3–5)	Jansen (17)	29–30	2:41	37,336	L1
60	June 3	@ Dodgers	9:10 pm	4–1	**Noesí** (1–4)	Haren (5–4)	**Belisario** (4)	30–30	3:05	44,477	W1
61	June 4	@ Dodgers	9:10 pm	2–1	**Danks** (4–5)	Beckett (3–3)	**Belisario** (5)	31–30	3:03	45,540	W2
62	June 6	@ Angels	9:05 pm	4–8	Weaver (7–4)	**Rienzo** (4–3)	—	31–31	3:10	38,521	L1
63	June 7	@ Angels	9:05 pm	5–6	Rasmus (1–0)	**Petricka** (0–1)	Frieri (9)	31–32	2:53	39,089	L2
64	June 8	@ Angels	2:35 pm	2–4	Wilson (7–5)	**Quintana** (3–6)	Frieri (10)	31–33	3:01	35,793	L3
65	June 9	Tigers	7:10 pm	6–5	**Noesí** (2–4)	Porcello (8–4)	**Belisario** (6)	32–33	3:13	**18,803**	W1
--	June 10	Tigers	7:10 pm	PPD, RAIN; rescheduled for Aug 30							
66	June 11	Tigers	7:10 pm	8–2	**Danks** (5–5)	Verlander (6–6)	—	33–33	3:17	**18,424**	W2
67	June 12	Tigers	7:10 pm	0–4	Scherzer (8–2)	**Sale** (5–1)	—	33–34	2:52	**20,626**	L1
68	June 13	Royals	7:10 pm	2–7	Guthrie (3–6)	**Quintana** (3–7)	—	33–35	3:22	**22,773**	L2
69	June 14	Royals	1:10 pm	1–9	Duffy (4–5)	**Noesí** (2–5)	—	33–36	3:03	**24,527**	L3
70	June 15	Royals	1:10 pm	3–6	Shields (8–3)	**Rienzo** (4–4)	Holland (20)	33–37	3:10	**29,152**	L4
71	June 17	Giants	7:10 pm	8–2	**Danks** (6–5)	Cain (1–5)	—	34–37	2:42	**25,278**	W1
72	June 18	Giants	1:10 pm	7–6	**Sale** (6–1)	Hudson (7–3)	**Belisario** (7)	35–37	3:12	**20,059**	W2
73	June 19	@ Twins	7:10 pm	2–4	Fien (4–4)	**Petricka** (0–2)	Perkins (18)	35–38	2:43	31,195	L1
74	June 20	@ Twins	7:10 pm	4–5	Perkins (3–0)	**Webb** (4–1)	—	35–39	3:16	32,071	L2
75	June 21	@ Twins	1:10 pm	3–4	Correia (4–8)	**Rienzo** (4–5)	Perkins (19)	35–40	3:07	32,647	L3
76	June 22	@ Twins	1:10 pm	5–6	Hughes (8–3)	**Danks** (6–6)	Burton (1)	35–41	2:55	30,491	L4
77	June 23	@ Orioles	6:05 pm	4–6	Brach (1–0)	**Belisario** (3–4)	—	35–42	3:08	17,931	L5
78	June 24	@ Orioles	6:05 pm	4–2	**Quintana** (4–7)	González (4–5)	**Belisario** (8)	36–42	3:09	20,596	W1
79	June 25	@ Orioles	6:05 pm	4–5 (12)	Hunter (2–1)	**Webb** (4–2)	—	36–43	4:03	22,020	L1
80	June 26	@ Blue Jays	6:07 pm	0–7	Happ (7–4)	**Carroll** (2–4)	—	36–44	3:00	23,248	L2
81	June 27	@ Blue Jays	6:07 pm	5–4	**Danks** (7–6)	Dickey (6–7)	**Petricka** (2)	37–44	2:58	24,173	W1
82	June 28	@ Blue Jays	12:07 pm	4–3	**Sale** (7–1)	McGowan (4–3)	**Putnam** (1)	38–44	2:58	39,623	W2
83	June 29	@ Blue Jays	12:07 pm	4–0	**Quintana** (5–7)	Buehrle (10–5)	—	39–44	2:32	33,177	W3
--	June 30	Angels	7:10 pm	PPD, RAIN; rescheduled for July 1							

July (14–12) – Home (6–6) – Road (8–6) – 116 R.S. 97 R.A.

#	Date	Opponent	Time	Score	Win	Loss	Save	Record	Location		
84	July 1	Angels	4:10 pm	4–8	Richards (9–2)	**Noesí** (2–6)	Smith (8)	39–45	2:54	**N/A**	L1
85	July 1	Angels	7:10 pm	5–7	Weaver (9–6)	**Carroll** (2–5)	Smith (9)	39–46	3:08	**20,233**	L2
86	July 2	Angels	7:10 pm	3–2	**Putnam** (3–1)	Morin (2–2)	—	40–46	2:49	**18,207**	W1
87	July 4	Mariners	6:10 pm	7–1	**Sale** (8–1)	Elías (7–7)	—	41–46	2:28	**30,297**	W2
88	July 5	Mariners	1:10 pm	2–3 (14)	Wilhelmsen (1–1)	**Belisario** (3–5)	Rodney (25)	41–47	4:38	**23,113**	L1
89	July 6	Mariners	1:10 pm	1–0	**Noesí** (3–6)	Walker (1–1)	**Petricka** (3)	42–47	2:49	**23,370**	W1
90	July 7	@ Red Sox	6:10 pm	4–0	**Carroll** (3–5)	Buchholz (3–5)	—	43–47	2:55	35,114	W2
91	July 8	@ Red Sox	6:10 pm	8–3	**Danks** (8–6)	Workman (1–3)	—	44–47	3:11	35,345	W3
92	July 9	@ Red Sox	6:10 pm	4–5	Uehara (5–2)	**Guerra** (0–1)	—	44–48	2:54	36,218	L1
93	July 10	@ Red Sox	3:05 pm	3–4 (10)	Miller (3–5)	**Belisario** (3–6)	—	44–49	3:22	37,547	L2
94	July 11	@ Indians	6:05 pm	4–7	Kluber (9–6)	**Noesí** (3–7)	Allen (11)	44–50	3:16	24,652	L3
95	July 12	@ Indians	2:05 pm	6–2	**Carroll** (4–5)	McAllister (3–5)	—	45–50	3:10	23,837	W1
96	July 13	@ Indians	12:05 pm	2–3	Shaw (4–1)	**Guerra** (0–2)	Allen (12)	45–51	3:00	18,070	L1
**All–Star Break (July 14–17)**
97	July 18	Astros	7:10 pm	3–2	**Webb** (5–2)	Feldman (4–7)	**Putnam** (2)	46–51	2:50	**28,777**	W1
98	July 19	Astros	6:10 pm	4–3	**Noesí** (4–7)	Keuchel (9–6)	**Putnam** (3)	47–51	3:18	**28,210**	W2
99	July 20	Astros	1:10 pm	7–11	Sipp (2–1)	**Webb** (5–3)	—	47–52	3:39	**26,256**	L1
100	July 21	Royals	7:10 pm	3–1	**Sale** (9–1)	Guthrie (5–9)	**Petricka** (4)	48–52	2:46	**18,888**	W1
101	July 22	Royals	7:10 pm	1–7	Chen (2–2)	**Carroll** (4–6)	—	48–53	3:35	**20,428**	L1
102	July 23	Royals	1:10 pm	1–2	Davis (6–2)	**Putnam** (3–2)	Holland (26)	48–54	3:03	**23,811**	L2
103	July 24	@ Twins	7:10 pm	5–2	**Noesí** (5–7)	Hughes (10–7)	**Petricka** (5)	49–54	2:46	32,952	W1
104	July 25	@ Twins	7:10 pm	9–5	**Danks** (9–6)	Correia (5–13)	—	50–54	2:51	28,728	W2
105	July 26	@ Twins	6:10 pm	7–0	**Sale** (10–1)	Darnell (0–1)	—	51–54	2:30	33,005	W3
106	July 27	@ Twins	1:10 pm	3–4	Burton (2–2)	**Belisario** (3–7)	Perkins (25)	51–55	2:44	27,818	L1
107	July 29	@ Tigers	6:08 pm	11–4	**Quintana** (6–7)	Sánchez (7–5)	—	52–55	3:16	40,032	W1
108	July 30	@ Tigers	6:08 pm	2–7	Scherzer (13–3)	**Noesí** (5–8)	—	52–56	2:49	37,193	L1
109	July 31	@ Tigers	12:08 pm	7–4	**Belisario** (4–7)	Soria (1–4)	**Petricka** (6)	53–56	4:01	41,306	W1

August (9–19) – Home (7–12) – Road (2–7) – 102 R.S. 167 R.A.

#	Date	Opponent	Time	Score	Win	Loss	Save	Record	Location		
110	August 1	Twins	7:10 pm	10–8	**Guerra** (1–2)	Fien (5–5)	**Petricka** (7)	54–56	3:47	**28,060**	W2
111	August 2	Twins	6:10 pm	6–8	Pressly (1–0)	**Belisario** (4–8)	Perkins (27)	54–57	2:58	**27,446**	L1
112	August 3	Twins	1:10 pm	3–16	Gibson (10–8)	**Guerra** (1–3)	—	54–58	4:01	**23,471**	L2
113	August 4	Rangers	7:10 pm	5–3 (7)	**Noesí** (6–8)	Martinez (1–8)	—	55–58	2:28	**17,040**	W1
114	August 5	Rangers	7:10 pm	0–16	Lewis (8–8)	**Danks** (9–7)	—	55–59	2:56	**21,827**	L1
115	August 6	Rangers	1:10 pm	1–3	Tepesch (4–7)	**Sale** (10–2)	Feliz (4)	55–60	2:57	**18,898**	L2
116	August 7	@ Mariners	9:10 pm	3–13	Elías (9–9)	**Carroll** (4–7)	—	55–61	3:08	18,740	L3
117	August 8	@ Mariners	9:10 pm	1–4	Iwakuma (10–6)	**Quintana** (6–8)	Rodney (32)	55–62	2:43	23,223	L4
118	August 9	@ Mariners	8:10 pm	2–1	**Surkamp** (1–0)	Rodney (1–5)	**Petricka** (8)	56–62	2:50	40,122	W1
119	August 10	@ Mariners	3:10 pm	2–4	Leone (5–2)	**Danks** (9–8)	Rodney (33)	56–63	2:50	27,236	L1
120	August 12	@ Giants	9:15 pm	3–2 (10)	**Putnam** (4–2)	Casilla (1–2)	—	57–63	3:12	42,317	W1
121	August 13	@ Giants	2:45 pm	1–7	Peavy (2–12)	**Quintana** (6–9)	—	57–64	2:44	41,725	L1
122	August 15	Blue Jays	7:10 pm	11–5	**Noesí** (7–8)	Stroman (7–4)	—	58–64	3:22	**22,739**	W1
123	August 16	Blue Jays	6:10 pm	3–6	Cecil (1–3)	**Lindstrom** (2–2)	Janssen (19)	58–65	2:54	**29,420**	L1
124	August 17	Blue Jays	1:10 pm	7–5	**Carroll** (5–7)	Hutchison (8–11)	**Petricka** (9)	59–65	3:00	**25,761**	W1
125	August 18	Orioles	7:10 pm	2–8	Norris (11–7)	**Sale** (10–3)	—	59–66	3:02	**17,686**	L1
126	August 19	Orioles	7:10 pm	1–5	Tillman (10–5)	**Quintana** (6–10)	—	59–67	2:42	**13,307**	L2
127	August 20	Orioles	7:10 pm	3–4	Chen (13–4)	**Noesí** (7–9)	Britton (27)	59–68	2:37	**15,137**	L3
128	August 22	@ Yankees	6:05 pm	3–4	Robertson (2–4)	**Webb** (5–4)	—	59–69	3:23	43,811	L4
129	August 23	@ Yankees	12:05 pm	3–5	Kuroda (9–8)	**Carroll** (5–8)	Robertson (34)	59–70	2:54	47,594	L5
130	August 24	@ Yankees	12:05 pm	4–7 (10)	Huff (4–1)	**Petricka** (0–3)	—	59–71	3:17	43,366	L6
131	August 26	Indians	7:10 pm	6–8 (10)	Shaw (5–3)	**Petricka** (0–4)	—	59–72	3:48	**12,462**	L7
132	August 27	Indians	7:10 pm	3–2	**Noesí** (8–9)	Kluber (13–8)	**Putnam** (4)	60–72	3:07	**11,976**	W1
133	August 28	Indians	7:10 pm	2–3	Carrasco (6–4)	**Danks** (9–9)	Allen (18)	60–73	3:18	**13,016**	L1
134	August 29	Tigers	7:10 pm	1–7	Verlander (12–11)	**Carroll** (5–9)	—	60–74	3:28	**17,071**	L2
135	August 30	Tigers	1:10 pm	6–3	**Sale** (11–3)	Scherzer (15–5)	**Petricka** (10)	61–74	2:54	**20,556**	W1
136	August 30	Tigers	7:10 pm	4–8	Ryan (1–0)	**Bassitt** (0–1)	—	61–75	3:23	**23,723**	L1
137	August 31	Tigers	1:10 pm	6–2	**Quintana** (7–10)	Porcello (15–9)	—	62–75	3:04	**26,336**	W1

September (11–14) – Home (6–5) – Road (5–9) – 84 R.S. 105 R.A.

#	Date	Opponent	Time	Score	Win	Loss	Save	Record	Location		
138	September 2	@ Twins	7:10 pm	6–3 (10)	**Webb** (6–4)	Oliveros (0–1)	**Petricka** (11)	63–75	3:35	23,719	W2
139	September 3	@ Twins	7:10 pm	4–11	May (1–4)	**Danks** (9–10)	—	63–76	3:12	21,778	L1
140	September 5	@ Indians	6:05 pm	1–2 (10)	Lee (1–1)	**Cleto** (0–1)	—	63–77	3:13	15,531	L2
141	September 6	@ Indians	6:05 pm	1–3	Kluber (15–9)	**Putnam** (4–3)	—	63–78	2:46	17,367	L3
142	September 7	@ Indians	12:05 pm	0–2	Carrasco (7–4)	**Carroll** (5–10)	Allen (19)	63–79	2:36	17,957	L4
143	September 8	Athletics	7:10 pm	5–4 (12)	**Guerra** (2–3)	Chavez (8–8)	—	64–79	3:38	**15,517**	W1
144	September 9	Athletics	7:10 pm	2–11	Lester (14–10)	**Danks** (9–11)	—	64–80	3:19	**12,150**	L1
145	September 10	Athletics	7:10 pm	2–1	**Putnam** (5–3)	Gregerson (4–4)	**Petricka** (12)	65–80	3:15	**15,046**	W1
146	September 11	Athletics	1:10 pm	1–0	**Sale** (12–3)	Kazmir (14–8)	**Petricka** (13)	66–80	2:18	**12,314**	W2
--	September 12	Twins	7:10 pm	PPD, RAIN; rescheduled for September 13							
147	September 13	Twins	3:10 pm	5–1	**Quintana** (8–10)	Hughes (15–10)	—	67–80	2:38	**N/A**	W3
148	September 13	Twins	7:10 pm	7–6	**Petricka** (1–4)	Perkins (3–3)	—	68–80	3:34	**20,106**	W4
149	September 14	Twins	1:10 pm	4–6	May (3–4)	**Noesí** (8–10)	Perkins (34)	68–81	2:43	**17,044**	L1
150	September 15	@ Royals	7:10 pm	3–4	Davis (9–2)	**Petricka** (1–5)	—	68–82	3:18	21,390	L2
151	September 16	@ Royals	7:10 pm	7–5	**Surkamp** (2–0)	Herrera (3–3)	**Putnam** (5)	69–82	4:16	28,904	W1
152	September 17	@ Royals	7:10 pm	2–6	Ventura (13–10)	**Sale** (12–4)	—	69–83	2:50	26,425	L1
153	September 19	@ Rays	6:10 pm	4–3	**Quintana** (9–10)	Hellickson (1–4)	**Putnam** (6)	70–83	3:29	17,540	W1
154	September 20	@ Rays	6:10 pm	1–3	Archer (10–8)	**Noesí** (8–11)	McGee (18)	70–84	3:05	21,830	L1
155	September 21	@ Rays	12:40 pm	10–5	**Danks** (10–11)	Karns (1–1)	—	71–84	3:26	21,270	W1
156	September 22	@ Tigers	6:08 pm	2–0	**Bassitt** (1–1)	Lobstein (1–1)	**Petricka** (14)	72–84	2:36	30,758	W2
157	September 23	@ Tigers	6:08 pm	3–4	Nathan (5–4)	**Petricka** (1–6)	—	72–85	3:19	33,213	L1
158	September 24	@ Tigers	12:08 pm	1–6	Verlander (15–12)	**Guerra** (2–4)	—	72–86	3:04	36,810	L2
159	September 25	Royals	7:10 pm	3–6	Herrera (4–3)	**Quintana** (9–11)	Holland (45)	72–87	3:06	**19,587**	L3
160	September 26	Royals	7:10 pm	1–3	Guthrie (13–11)	**Noesí** (8–12)	Holland (46)	72–88	2:41	**27,416**	L4
161	September 27	Royals	6:10 pm	5–4	**Danks** (11–11)	Duffy (9–12)	**Guerra** (1)	73–88	3:19	**38,160**	W1
162	September 28	Royals	1:10 pm	4–6	Coleman (1–0)	**Webb** (6–5)	Coleman (1)	73–89	3:34	**32,266**	L1

== Roster ==
2014 Chicago White Sox
Roster
Pitchers: 61 Chris Bassitt; 54 Ronald Belisario; 67 Scott Carroll; 39 Maikel Cleto; 50 John Danks; 37 Scott Downs; 43 Frank Francisco; 41 Javy Guerra; 45 Erik Johnson; 65 Nate Jones; 61 Charles Leesman; 27 Matt Lindstrom; 48 Héctor Noesí; 55 Felipe Paulino; 52 Jake Petricka; 57 Zach Putnam; 62 José Quintana; 64 André Rienzo; 49 Chris Sale; 68 Scott Snodgress; 53 Eric Surkamp; 60 Taylor Thompson; 46 Donnie Veal; 40 Daniel Webb	Catchers: 21 Tyler Flowers; 17 Adrián Nieto; 36 Josh Phegley; Infielders: 79 José Abreu; 15 Gordon Beckham; 44 Adam Dunn; 28 Leury García; 12 Conor Gillaspie; 14 Paul Konerko; 10 Alexei Ramírez; 77 Carlos Sánchez; 5 Marcus Semien; 38 Andy Wilkins; Outfielders: 20 Jordan Danks; 30 Alejandro De Aza; 1 Adam Eaton; 26 Avisaíl García; 25 Moisés Sierra; 51 Michael Taylor; 24 Dayán Viciedo	Manager: 23 Robin Ventura; Coaches: 3 Harold Baines (assistant hitting); 32 Daryl Boston (first base); 99 Don Cooper (pitching); 31 Todd Steverson (hitting); 47 Joe McEwing (third base); 8 Mark Parent (bench); 59 Mark Salas (bullpen catcher); 58 Bobby Thigpen (bullpen); -- Jim Thome (special assistant)

== Player stats ==
=== Batting ===
Note: G = Games played; AB = At bats; R = Runs scored; H = Hits; 2B = Doubles; 3B = Triples; HR = Home runs; RBI = Runs batted in; BB = Base on balls; SO = Strikeouts; AVG = Batting average; SB = Stolen bases

Player	G	AB	R	H	2B	3B	HR	RBI	BB	SO	AVG	SB
José Abreu, 1B, DH	145	556	80	176	35	2	36	107	51	131	.317	3
Gordon Beckham, 2B	101	390	43	86	24	0	7	36	19	70	.221	3
John Danks, P	1	3	0	1	0	0	0	0	0	1	.333	0
Jordan Danks, OF	51	117	14	26	2	0	2	10	14	46	.222	5
Alejandro De Aza, LF, CF	122	395	45	96	19	5	5	31	33	100	.243	15
Adam Dunn, DH, 1B, LF, RF	106	363	43	80	17	0	20	54	65	132	.220	1
Adam Eaton, CF	123	486	76	146	26	10	1	35	43	83	.300	15
Tyler Flowers, C	127	407	42	98	16	1	15	50	25	159	.241	0
Avisaíl García, RF	46	172	19	42	8	0	7	29	14	44	.244	4
Leury García, 2B, OF, 3B, SS	73	145	13	24	3	0	1	6	5	48	.166	11
Conor Gillaspie, 3B	130	464	50	131	31	5	7	57	36	78	.282	0
Erik Johnson, P	1	3	0	0	0	0	0	0	0	0	.000	0
Paul Konerko, DH, 1B	81	208	15	43	8	0	5	22	10	51	.207	0
Adrián Nieto, C	48	106	8	25	5	0	2	7	8	38	.236	0
Héctor Noesí, P	2	4	0	0	0	0	0	0	0	1	.000	0
Felipe Paulino, P	1	1	0	0	0	0	0	0	0	0	.000	0
Josh Phegley, C	11	37	4	8	2	0	3	7	0	11	.216	0
José Quintana, P	4	9	0	0	0	0	0	0	0	4	.000	0
Alexei Ramírez, SS	158	622	82	170	35	2	15	74	24	81	.273	21
Chris Sale, P	1	3	0	0	0	0	0	0	0	2	.000	0
Carlos Sánchez, 2B, SS	28	100	6	25	5	0	0	5	3	25	.250	1
Marcus Semien, 2B, 3B	64	231	30	54	10	2	6	28	21	70	.234	3
Moisés Sierra, OF	83	127	20	35	8	2	2	7	7	34	.276	3
Michael Taylor, OF	11	28	3	7	1	0	0	0	5	9	.250	0
Dayán Viciedo, RF, LF	145	523	65	121	22	3	21	58	32	122	.231	0
Andy Wilkins, 1B	17	43	2	6	2	0	0	2	2	22	.140	0
Team totals	162	5543	660	1400	279	32	155	625	417	1362	.253	85

=== Pitching ===
Note: W = Wins; L = Losses; ERA = Earned run average; G = Games pitched; GS = Games started; SV = Saves; IP = Innings pitched; H = Hits allowed; R = Runs allowed; ER = Earned runs allowed; HR = Home runs allowed; BB = Walks allowed; K = Strikeouts

Player	W	L	ERA	G	GS	SV	IP	H	R	ER	HR	BB	K
Chris Bassitt	1	1	3.94	6	5	0	29.2	34	13	13	0	13	21
Ronald Belisario	4	8	5.56	62	0	8	66.1	78	46	41	4	18	47
Scott Carroll	5	10	4.80	26	19	0	129.1	147	81	69	13	45	64
Maikel Cleto	0	1	4.60	28	0	0	29.1	24	18	15	3	23	32
John Danks	11	11	4.74	32	32	0	193.2	205	106	102	25	74	129
Scott Downs	0	2	6.08	38	0	1	23.2	24	17	16	1	15	22
Adam Dunn	0	0	9.00	1	0	0	1.0	2	1	1	0	0	1
Frank Francisco	0	0	12.27	4	0	0	3.2	7	6	5	2	3	5
Leury García	0	1	18.00	1	0	0	1.0	1	2	2	0	2	0
Javy Guerra	2	4	2.91	42	0	1	46.1	41	15	15	3	20	38
Nate Jones	0	0	inf	2	0	0	0.0	2	4	4	0	3	0
Erik Johnson	1	1	6.46	5	5	0	23.2	27	18	17	1	15	18
Charles Leesman	0	1	20.25	1	1	0	2.2	9	6	6	1	1	0
Matt Lindstrom	2	2	5.03	35	0	6	34.0	47	23	19	3	12	18
Héctor Noesí	8	11	4.39	28	27	0	166.0	167	88	81	27	54	117
Felipe Paulino	0	2	11.29	4	4	0	18.1	35	24	23	6	12	14
Jake Petricka	1	6	2.96	67	0	14	73.0	67	24	24	3	33	55
Zach Putnam	5	3	1.98	49	0	6	54.2	39	14	12	2	20	46
José Quintana	9	11	3.32	32	32	0	200.1	197	87	74	10	52	178
André Rienzo	4	5	6.82	18	11	0	64.2	82	54	49	12	33	51
Chris Sale	12	4	2.17	26	26	0	174.0	129	48	42	13	39	208
Scott Snodgress	0	0	15.43	4	0	0	2.1	8	7	4	1	3	1
Eric Surkamp	2	0	4.81	35	0	0	24.1	22	14	13	3	13	20
Taylor Thompson	0	0	10.13	5	0	0	5.1	9	6	6	1	4	4
Donnie Veal	0	0	7.50	7	0	0	6.0	6	5	5	0	7	6
Daniel Webb	6	5	3.99	57	0	0	67.2	59	31	30	6	42	58
Team totals	73	89	4.29	162	162	36	1441.0	1468	758	687	140	557	1152

== Farm system ==
Level	Team	League	Manager
AAA	Charlotte Knights	International League	Joel Skinner
AA	Birmingham Barons	Southern League	Julio Vinas
A	Winston-Salem Dash	Carolina League	Tommy Thompson
A	Kannapolis Intimidators	South Atlantic League	Pete Rose Jr.
Rookie	AZL White Sox	Arizona League	Mike Gellinger
Rookie	Great Falls Voyagers	Pioneer League	Charles Poe
