= Taylor Thompson =

Taylor Thompson may refer to:

- Taylor Thompson (American football) (born 1989), American football player
- Taylor Thompson (baseball) (born 1987), baseball player
