= Adrián Nieto =

Cuban baseball player (born 1989)

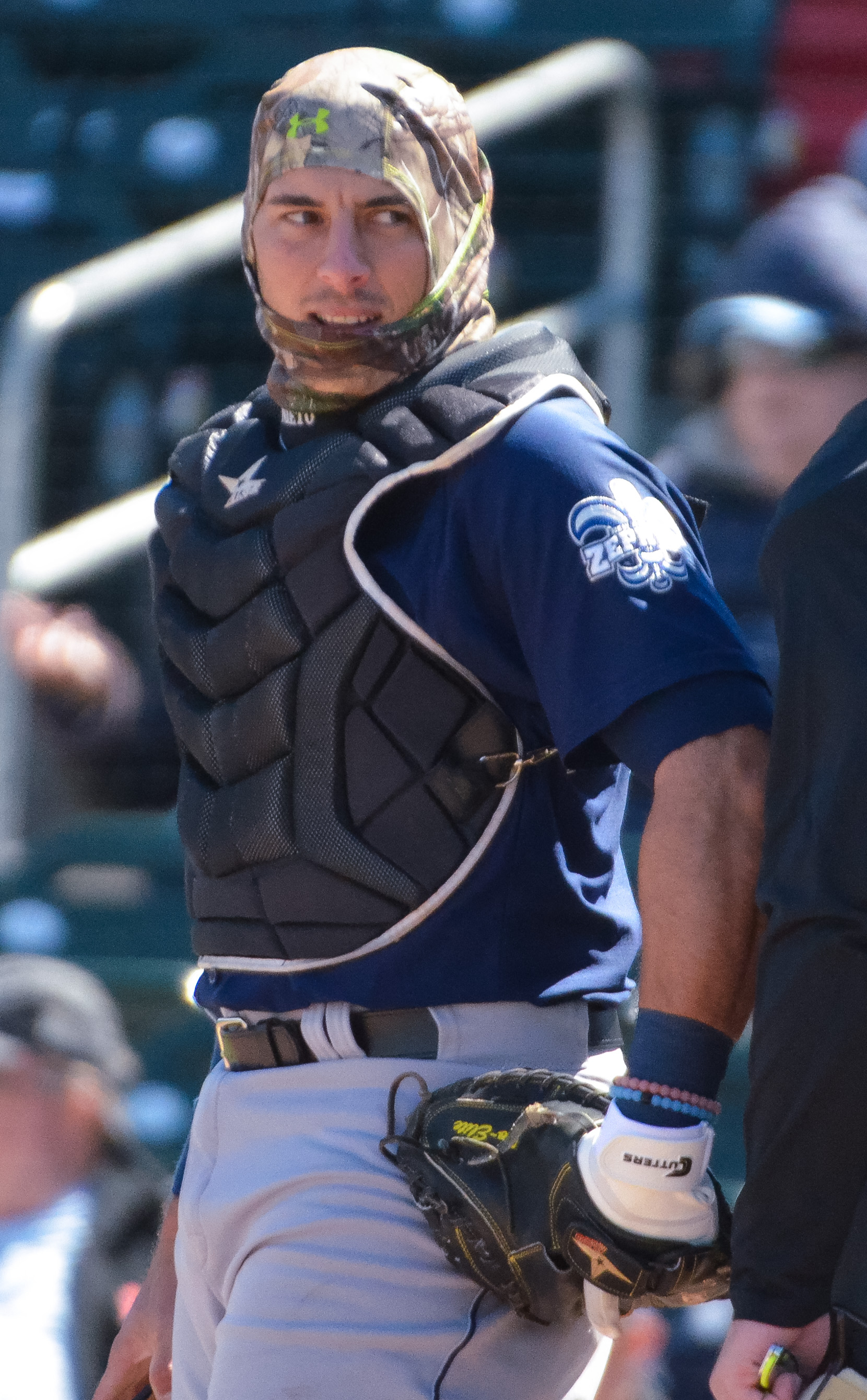
- Nieto with the New Orleans Zephyrs in 2016
- Catcher
- Born: November 12, 1989 (age 36); Havana, Cuba
- Batted: Switch Threw: Right

MLB debut
- April 2, 2014, for the Chicago White Sox

Last MLB appearance
- September 26, 2014, for the Chicago White Sox

MLB statistics
- Batting average: .236
- Home runs: 2
- Runs batted in: 7
- Stats at Baseball Reference

Teams
- Chicago White Sox (2014)

Adrián Nieto (born November 12, 1989) is a Cuban former professional baseball catcher. He played one season in Major League Baseball (MLB) for the Chicago White Sox.

== Career ==
=== Washington Nationals ===
Nieto was born in Cuba, but raised in Florida. He attended American Heritage High School in Plantation, Florida. He played for the school's baseball team as a catcher. After Nieto graduated, the Washington Nationals selected him in the fifth round of the 2008 Major League Baseball (MLB) Draft. He signed with the Nationals, receiving a $376,500 signing bonus, roughly twice as much as MLB suggested he should receive based on his draft position. He made his professional debut with the GCL Nationals, posting a .217/.308/.348 slash line. In 2009, he returned to the GCL Nationals, batting .228/.337/.287 with 17 RBI in 42 games. The next year, Nieto played for the Single-A Hagerstown Suns, slashing .195/.291/.253 with 2 home runs and 14 RBI. In 2011, he was suspended for 50 games for violating the league's performance-enhancing drug policy after testing positive for an anabolic steroid. He split the year between the Low-A Auburn Doubledays, Hagerstown, and the High-A Potomac Nationals, accumulating a .278/.360/.450 batting line with career-highs in home runs (7) and RBI (34). In 2012, Nieto split the season between Hagerstown and the GCL Nationals, hitting .247/.340/.385 between the two teams. Nieto played for the Spanish national baseball team in the 2013 World Baseball Classic. In the 2013 season, Nieto batted .285 with 11 home runs for Potomac in the Class A-Advanced Carolina League. The Nationals assigned him to the Arizona Fall League after the season to continue his development.

=== Chicago White Sox ===
On December 12, 2013, the Chicago White Sox selected Nieto with the third pick in the Rule 5 draft. Because Nieto was a Rule 5 pick, he had to be on the Chicago White Sox roster for the entire season, so for 2014, he was the backup to Tyler Flowers, batting .236/.296/.340 in 48 games. He was assigned to the Triple-A Birmingham Barons for the 2015 season, and batted .207/.344/.316 with 5 home runs and 27 RBI in 81 games. On October 7, 2015, Nieto was outrighted off of the 40-man roster. He elected free agency on November 6, 2015.

=== Miami Marlins ===
On December 2, 2015, Nieto signed a minor league contract with the Miami Marlins organization. He spent the year with the Triple-A New Orleans Zephyrs, where he slashed .195/.287/.257 with one home run and 19 RBI. Nieto elected free agency following the season on November 7.

=== Cincinnati Reds ===
Nieto signed a minor league contract with the Cincinnati Reds organization on January 2, 2017. He was assigned to the Triple-A Louisville Bats, and also spent time with the Double-A Pensacola Blue Wahoos, but was released by the Reds organization on August 27 after hitting a cumulative .230/.282/.323 with 3 home runs and 21 RBI.

=== Kansas City T-Bones ===
On May 4, 2018, Nieto signed with the Kansas City T-Bones of the independent American Association. In 81 games for Kansas City, Nieto slashed .313/.384/.426 with 6 home runs and 44 RBI. He was released by the team on March 11, 2019.

=== Sioux Falls Canaries ===
On March 19, 2019, Nieto signed with the Sioux Falls Canaries of the American Association. Nieto played in 32 games for Sioux Falls, batting .269/.336/.392 with 4 home runs and 24 RBI.

=== Miami Marlins (second stint) ===
On June 22, 2019, Nieto's contract was purchased by the Miami Marlins organization. He split the remainder of the season between the Double–A Jacksonville Jumbo Shrimp and the High–A Jupiter Hammerheads, posting a cumulative .188/.233/.288 slash line with two home runs and seven RBI. Nieto elected free agency following the season on November 4.

=== Southern Maryland Blue Crabs ===
On February 4, 2020, Nieto signed with the Southern Maryland Blue Crabs of the Atlantic League of Professional Baseball. Nieto did not play a game for the team because of the cancellation of the 2020 ALPB season due to the COVID-19 pandemic and became a free agent after the year.

== See also ==
- Rule 5 draft results
