= Moisés Sierra =

Dominican baseball player (born 1988)

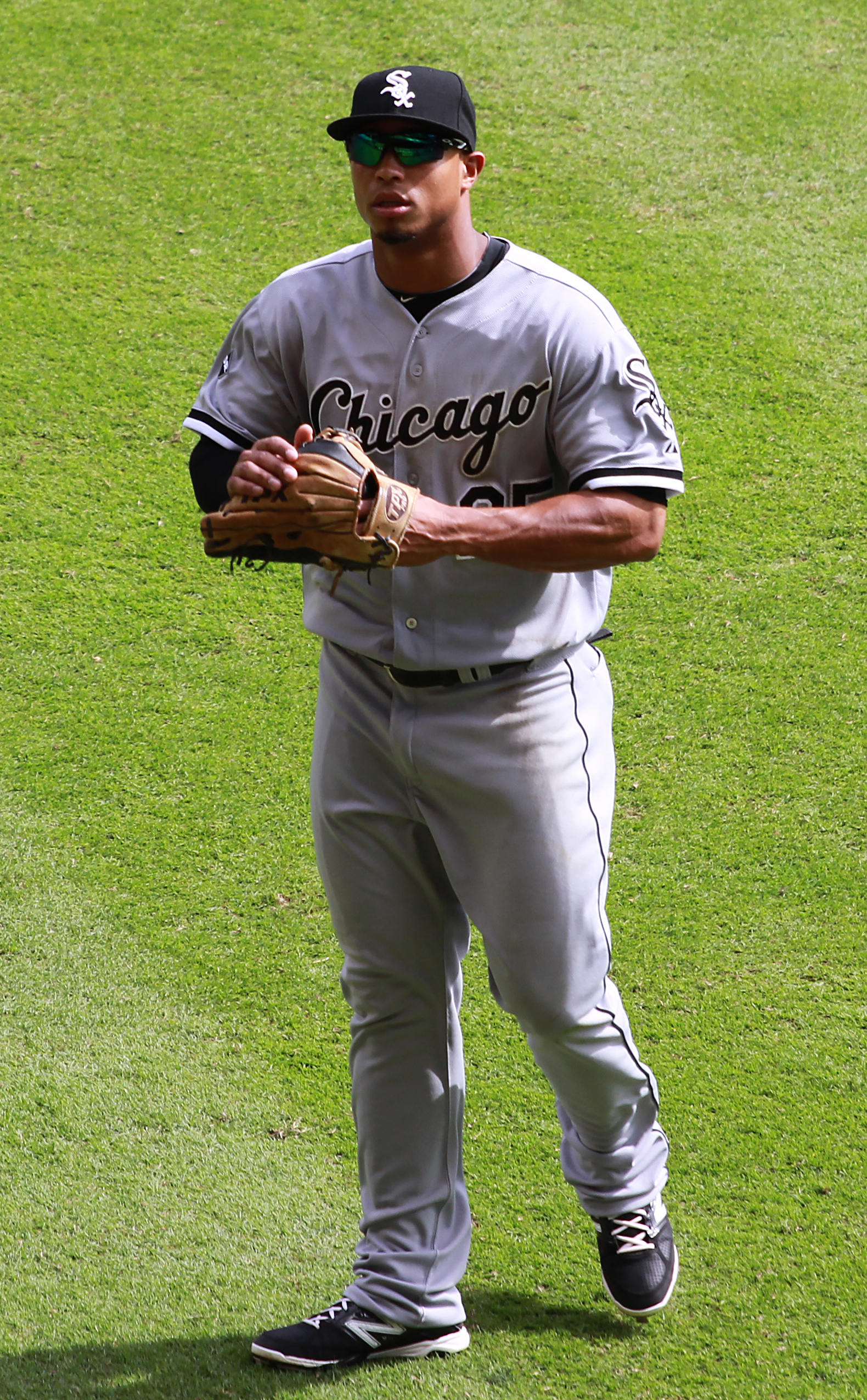
- Sierra with the Chicago White Sox
- Right fielder
- Born: September 24, 1988 (age 38); Santo Domingo, Dominican Republic
- Batted: Right Threw: Right

Professional debut
- MLB: July 31, 2012, for the Toronto Blue Jays
- NPB: September 29, 2020, for the Chunichi Dragons

Last appearance
- MLB: May 15, 2018, for the Washington Nationals
- NPB: October 5, 2020, for the Chunichi Dragons

MLB statistics
- Batting average: .235
- Home runs: 9
- Runs batted in: 41

NPB statistics
- Batting average: .225
- Home runs: 1
- Runs batted in: 7
- Stats at Baseball Reference

Teams
- Toronto Blue Jays (2012–2014); Chicago White Sox (2014); Washington Nationals (2018); Chunichi Dragons (2020)
Medals
Men's baseball
Representing Dominican Republic
World Baseball Classic
Gold medal – first place	2013 San Francisco	Team

Moisés Sierra (born September 24, 1988) is a Dominican former professional baseball outfielder. He has previously played in Major League Baseball (MLB) for the Toronto Blue Jays, Chicago White Sox, and Washington Nationals, and in Nippon Professional Baseball (NPB) for the Chunichi Dragons.

== Career ==
=== Toronto Blue Jays ===
Sierra began his professional career in 2006, playing for the DSL Blue Jays. That year, he hit .253 with 4 home runs, 26 RBIs, and 17 stolen bases in 69 games. He played for the GCL Blue Jays in 2007, hitting .203 with 5 home runs and 15 RBIs. In 2008, he was with the Lansing Lugnuts, with whom he hit .246 with 9 home runs, 39 RBIs, and 12 stolen bases. He split 2009 between the Dunedin Blue Jays and New Hampshire Fisher Cats, hitting a combined .292 with 6 home runs and 62 RBIs.

In 2010, he split the season between the GCL Blue Jays and Dunedin, hitting a combined .211 in 20 games.

In 2013, he played for Buffalo in the International League and the Blue Jays in the Gulf League, hitting a combined .262 in 103 games.

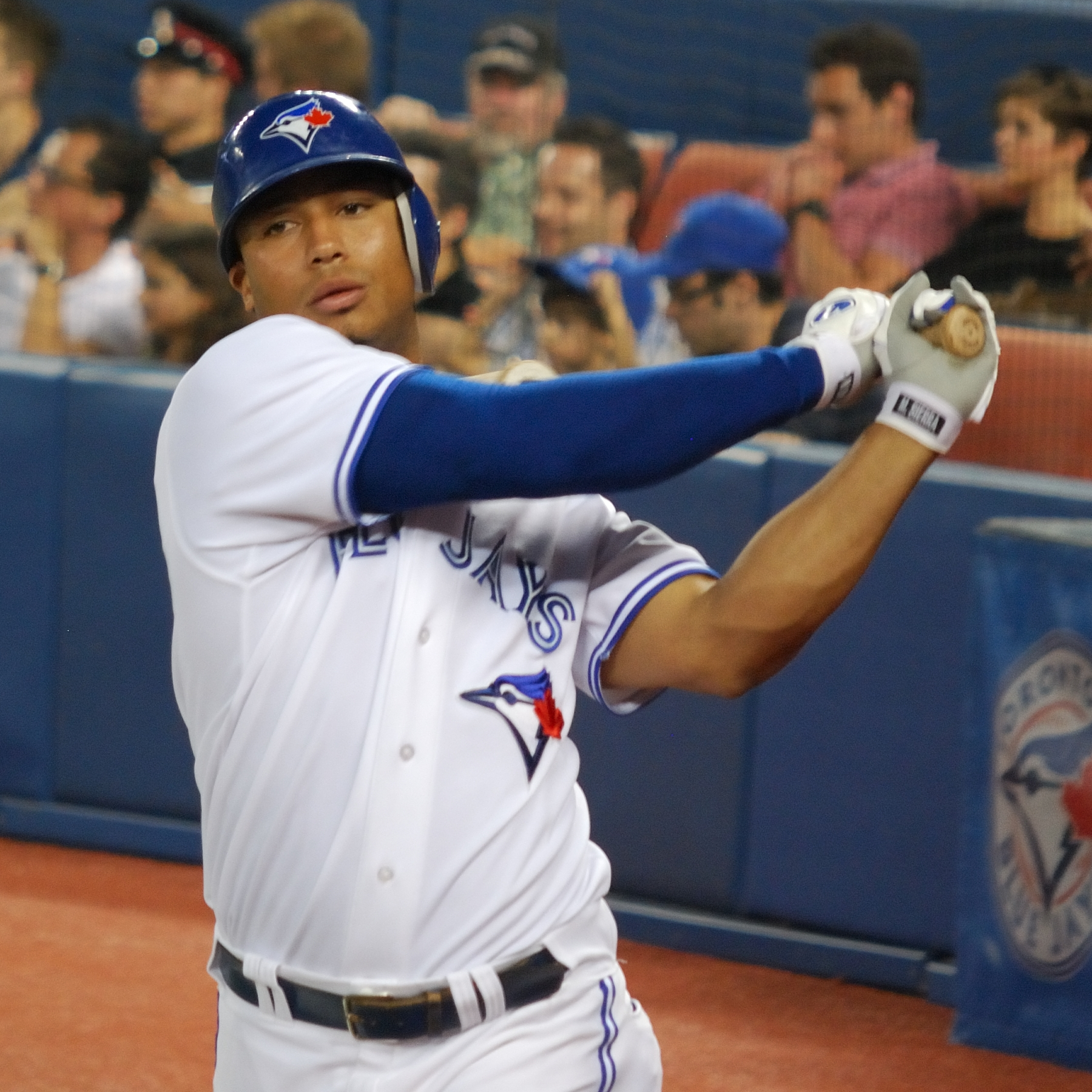
Sierra playing for the Toronto Blue Jays in 2012

Sierra was brought up to the Toronto Blue Jays on July 31, 2012, following the trades of Travis Snider and Eric Thames. At the time of his call-up, Sierra was batting .289 with 17 home runs and 63 RBIs in 100 games at Triple-A Las Vegas Sierra made his debut that night against the Seattle Mariners, and recorded his first career hit in his first at bat. On August 13, Sierra hit his first career home run, a solo shot off Chicago White Sox starter Jake Peavy. In 2012, he batted .224, in 147 at bats.

The Blue Jays optioned Sierra to the Buffalo Bisons on March 3, 2013. Sierra was called up to the Blue Jays on August 21, when José Bautista was placed on the 15-day disabled list.

Sierra started the 2014 season on the Blue Jays' 25-man roster. He was designated for assignment on May 1.

=== Chicago White Sox ===
On May 3, 2014, Sierra was claimed by the Chicago White Sox. Sierra found regular time as a reserve outfielder for the White Sox in 2014, hitting .279 with two home runs, before going on the disabled list with a strained oblique on August 16.

=== Kansas City Royals ===
On October 24, 2014, Sierra was claimed by the Kansas City Royals. He was designated for assignment and then outrighted to Triple-A on December 16, 2014. He was invited to Spring Training for the 2015 season but did not make the club and was assigned to the Omaha Storm Chasers. He was released by the Royals on July 22, 2015.

=== Miami Marlins ===
On December 31, 2015, Sierra signed a minor league contract with the Miami Marlins.

Sierra re–signed with the Marlins on a new minor league contract on November 17, 2016. He spent the 2017 season with the Triple–A New Orleans Baby Cakes, playing in 123 games and hitting .294/.361/.438 with 11 home runs, 68 RBI, and 18 stolen bases. Sierra elected free agency following the season on November 6, 2017.

=== Washington Nationals ===
On December 19, 2017, Sierra signed a minor league contract with the Washington Nationals. He was added to the active roster on April 11, 2018, and he made his first major league start since 2014 on April 14 against the Colorado Rockies, driving in two runs.

After 24 games and 60 plate appearances for the Nationals, in which he went 9-for-54 with two doubles and four RBIs, the Nationals designated him for assignment on May 20, 2018. He accepted an outright assignment to the Nationals' Triple-A affiliate, the Syracuse Chiefs. He declared free agency on October 2, 2018.

=== Guerreros de Oaxaca ===
On March 27, 2019, Sierra signed with the Guerreros de Oaxaca of the Mexican League. Sierra slashed a stellar .355/.464/.572 with 18 home runs and 84 RBI in 114 games for Oaxaca in 2019.

=== Chunichi Dragons ===
On December 5, 2019, it was announced that Sierra had signed with the Chunichi Dragons of Nippon Professional Baseball League (NPB) on a development contract. On March 26, 2020, Sierra was given a fully rostered deal ahead of the delayed, 2020 season. Sierra made his NPB debut on September 29. On December 2, 2020, he became a free agent.

=== Tecolotes de los Dos Laredos ===
On March 4, 2021, Sierra signed with the Tecolotes de los Dos Laredos of the Mexican League. In 53 games, he slashed .299/.385/.462 with 8 home runs and 30 RBIs. He was released following the season on October 20, 2021.

=== Wild Health Genomes ===
On February 28, 2022, Sierra signed with the Wild Health Genomes of the Atlantic League of Professional Baseball. He appeared in 76 games for the Genomes, slashing .288/.406/.438 with 8 home runs, 47 RBI, and 11 stolen bases. He became a free agent following the season.

=== Spire City Ghost Hounds ===
On February 20, 2023, Sierra signed with the Spire City Ghost Hounds of the Atlantic League of Professional Baseball. In 30 games for the Ghost Hounds, he batted .253/.352/.385 with 2 home runs and 8 RBI. On August 4, Sierra was released by Spire City.

== Coaching Career ==
In 2026, he was named as a coach for the DSL Dodgers, the summer-league affiliate of the Los Angeles Dodgers.
