= Eric Surkamp =

American baseball player (born 1987)

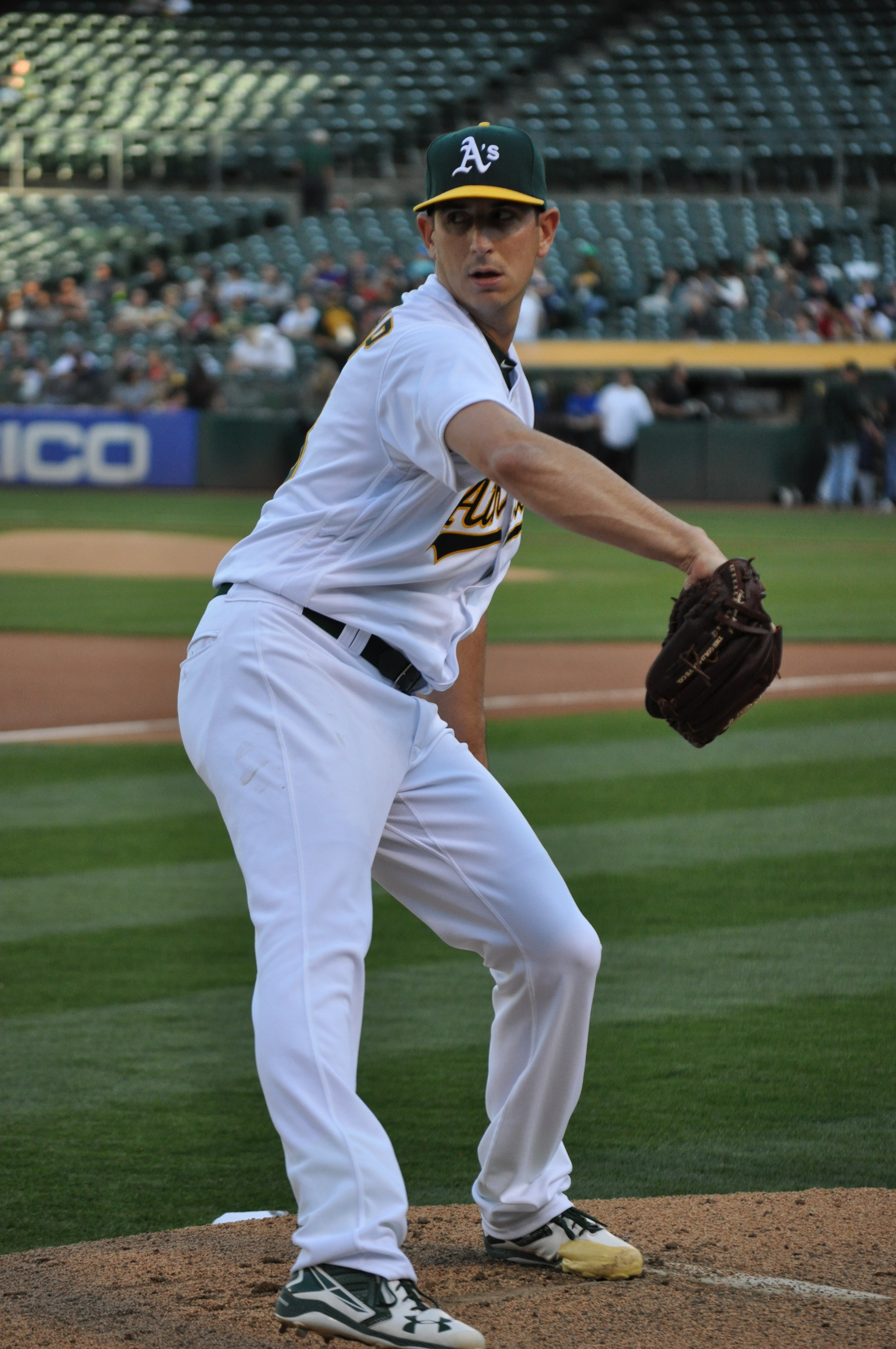
- Surkamp with the Oakland Athletics in 2016
- Pitcher
- Born: July 16, 1987 (age 39); Cincinnati, Ohio, U.S.
- Batted: Left Threw: Left

Professional debut
- MLB: August 27, 2011, for the San Francisco Giants
- KBO: July 14, 2016, for the Hanwha Eagles

Last appearance
- MLB: June 24, 2016, for the Oakland Athletics
- KBO: October 8, 2016, for the Hanwha Eagles

MLB statistics
- Win–loss record: 4–8
- Earned run average: 6.68
- Strikeouts: 59

KBO statistics
- Win–loss record: 2–5
- Earned run average: 6.31
- Strikeouts: 36
- Stats at Baseball Reference

Teams
- San Francisco Giants (2011, 2013); Chicago White Sox (2014); Los Angeles Dodgers (2015); Oakland Athletics (2016); Hanwha Eagles (2016)

Eric Michael Surkamp (born July 16, 1987) is an American former Major League Baseball (MLB) pitcher who played for the San Francisco Giants, Chicago White Sox, Los Angeles Dodgers, and Oakland Athletics from 2011 to 2016. He also pitched for the Hanwha Eagles of the KBO League in 2016. Surkamp batted and threw left-handed with his fastball averaging 89 miles per hour (143 km/h).

Growing up, Surkamp helped Moeller High School become Ohio state baseball champions in 2004. He played college baseball at North Carolina State University (NC State) and was a member of Team USA in 2007. Drafted by the Giants in the sixth round in the 2008 MLB draft, he was called up in August 2011 after posting a 2.02 earned run average (ERA), which led the Eastern League. He had a 2–2 record with the Giants and was considered a fringe candidate for the team's Opening Day roster in 2012, though he wound up missing that season due to Tommy John surgery. He made only one start for the Giants in 2013, allowing seven runs in 2 2/3 innings. in a 9–3 loss to the Cincinnati Reds.

Following the year, Surkamp was claimed off waivers by the White Sox. Used exclusively as a relief pitcher by them in 2014, he appeared in 35 games, posting a 4.81 ERA. He failed to make their roster in 2015 and was traded to the Dodgers in May, making one appearance with the team in July. A free agent after that year, he signed a minor league contract with the Athletics for 2016. Called up four times in 2016, he made nine starts for Oakland but posted an 0–5 record. In the latter part of the season, he pitched for Hanwha in the KBO League, initially as a starting pitcher, though he was moved to the bullpen after posting an 0–3 record in a little over a month. Following his professional career, he earned a Bachelor of Science in Business from NC State and became a Cincinnati-area realtor for Comey & Shepherd.

== Early life and amateur career ==
Eric Michael Surkamp was born July 16, 1987, in Cincinnati, Ohio. Growing up, he always enjoyed watching left-handed pitchers, particularly Andy Pettitte. At Moeller High School, he was the number two pitcher in the baseball team's starting rotation, behind Andrew Brackman. As a junior in 2004, he posted an 0.44 earned run average (ERA) and won all eight of his decisions, striking out 81 batters while giving up only 26 hits in 48 innings pitched. Brackman and he went a combined 15–0, helping their school win its fourth state championship, with Surkamp getting the start in the championship game.

After graduating Moeller in 2005, Surkamp attended North Carolina State University (NC State), where he played college baseball for the Wolfpack and was again a teammate of Brackman. In 18 games (12 starts) as a freshman in 2006, he posted a 2–3 record, a 5.10 ERA, 48 strikeouts, and 32 walks in 60 innings pitched. Following the college season, he played collegiate summer baseball with the Orleans Cardinals of the Cape Cod Baseball League. In 13 games (five starts), he had a 3–2 record, a 2.37 ERA, 38 strikeouts, 23 walks, and 23 hits allowed in 38 innings.

As a sophomore in 2007, Surkamp was selected to the second All-Atlantic Coast Conference team. In 16 starts, he had a 4–5 record, a 3.47 ERA, 84 strikeouts, 27 walks, and 92 hits allowed in 96 innings pitched. He tried out for Team USA in 2007; after initially not getting selected, he pitched for Orleans again. In five games (four starts), he had a 2–0 record, a 1.85 ERA, 26 strikeouts, eight walks, and 20 hits allowed in 24 1/3 innings. He was then added to Team USA's roster in late July due to an injury, and he made two appearances in the World Port Tournament in Rotterdam. Again making 16 starts for the Wolfpack in his senior year, he had a 5–3 record, a 4.89 ERA, 86 strikeouts, 40 walks, and 76 hits allowed in 73 2/3 innings pitched. He was selected by the San Francisco Giants in the sixth round of the 2008 Major League Baseball (MLB) Draft.

== Professional career ==
=== San Francisco Giants ===
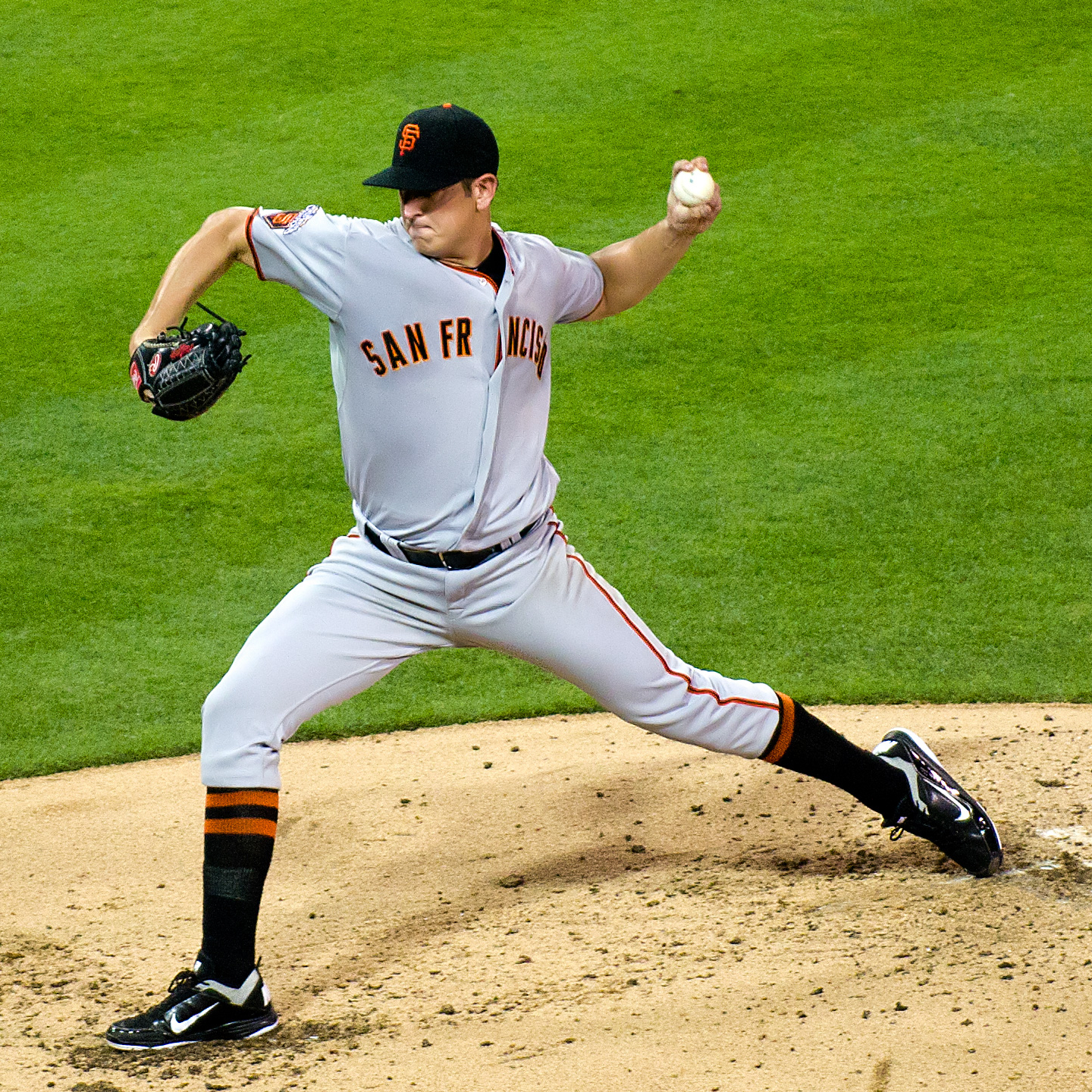
Surkamp with the Giants in 2011

Upon signing with the Giants' organization in 2008, Surkamp was briefly assigned to the rookie-level Arizona League Giants. He appeared in just two games for them before getting promoted to the Salem-Keizer Volcanoes of the Single-A short season Northwest League. In five games (four starts), he had an 0–2 record, a 6.43 ERA, 16 strikeouts, five walks, and 20 hits allowed in 14 innings pitched.

For the 2009 season, Surkamp joined the Single-A Augusta Greenjackets of the South Atlantic League. In 23 starts, he had an 11–5 record and a 3.30 ERA in 130 innings pitched. His 11 wins tied with Johnny Dorn for second in the league behind Charles Leesman's 13, and his 169 strikeouts were second to Matt Moore's 176. Promoted to the Single-A Advanced San Jose Giants of the California League at the end of the year, Surkamp made two playoff starts for the team. On September 19, 2009, he started the third game of the California League Championship Series against the High Desert Mavericks. Surkamp allowed three runs in the first two innings but settled down after that, striking out 12 batters over eight innings and earning the victory in San Jose's 4–3 win which clinched the league championship. Interviewed about the game at the beginning of the 2010 season, Surkamp said, "I think I just got comfortable in the game and was able to get into a groove. The adrenaline was pumping with it being a championship game. It was fun."

In 2010, Surkamp remained with San Jose. He made 17 starts for the Giants, posting a 4–2 record, a 3.11 ERA, 108 strikeouts, 22 walks, and 79 hits allowed in 101 1/3 innings. Surkamp's season ended in the middle of July when he suffered a dislocated hip while trying to field a ground ball. He underwent surgery on the hip, performed by Dr. Marc Philippon, who had also conducted hip surgery on Alex Rodriguez the previous season.

Recovered from the surgery by the beginning of the 2011 season, Surkamp was assigned to the Double-A Richmond Flying Squirrels of the Eastern League. He opened the season as the Giants' eighth-best prospect, according to Baseball America. In 23 games (22 starts), he had a 10–4 record, a 2.02 ERA, 165 strikeouts, 44 walks, and 110 hits allowed in 142 1/3 innings. He led the league in ERA and walks plus hits per innings pitched (1.08), tied for fifth with seven other pitchers in wins, and trailed only Austin Hyatt (171) in strikeouts. After Jonathan Sánchez suffered an ankle injury, Surkamp was called up to the majors for the first time on August 27, 2011. He allowed one run in six innings in his debut that day against the Houston Astros. After the game, he was briefly optioned to San Jose, with the Giants planning to recall him after one start once the rosters expanded in September. In his second major league start, on September 6, he picked up his first major league win, giving up three runs in five innings in a 6–4 victory over the San Diego Padres. Facing the Padres in his next start six days later, he allowed three runs (two earned) in 5 2/3 innings, earning the victory in an 8–3 win. However, after failing to complete five innings against the Colorado Rockies on September 17, he struggled in his last two starts of the season, losing both of them. In six starts, he had a 2-2 record, a 5.74 ERA, 13 strikeouts, 17 walks, and 32 hits allowed in 26 2/3 innings.

A fringe candidate for the Giants' rotation in 2012, Surkamp had a 3–1 record and a 4.41 ERA in spring training. He began 2012 on the disabled list with a strained elbow. He attempted to rehab at the Giants' minor league facility in Arizona, but his arm failed to regain the necessary strength. On July 24, Surkamp underwent Tommy John surgery, which prevented him from pitching for the rest of the season.

Surkamp began the 2013 season on the disabled list, as he was still recovering from the Tommy John surgery. He began his comeback in June with San Jose, posting a 2.93 ERA in five starts. Then, he made 11 starts for the Triple-A Fresno Grizzlies of the Pacific Coast League. Giants reporter Chris Haft described his performance as "promising", as he posted a 7–1 record with a 2.78 ERA and held opponents to a .221 batting average. In the midst of his time with Fresno, he was called up to start the first game of a doubleheader for San Francisco on July 23. He pitched just 2 2/3 innings against the Cincinnati Reds, giving up seven runs in a 9–3 loss. Sent back to Fresno the next day, he was not recalled by the Giants when rosters expanded in September. Surkamp was designated for assignment by the Giants on December 19 in order for the team to make room on the 40-man roster for free-agent signees.

=== Chicago White Sox ===
Surkamp was claimed off waivers by the Chicago White Sox on December 23, 2013. He was optioned to the Charlotte Knights of the Triple-A International League on March 19, before the season. On June 26, he was recalled when Scott Downs was designated for assignment. With Chicago, he was used exclusively as a relief pitcher. On August 9, he entered a game against the Seattle Mariners with one out in the ninth inning, got Kyle Seager to hit into a double play, and earned the win when Chicago scored in the tenth and held on for a 2–1 victory. Optioned to Charlotte the next day, he was recalled on August 16 when Charles Leesman was designated for assignment. After pitching in just three games, he was again optioned to Charlotte on August 22 when Javy Guerra was reinstated from the bereavement list, but Surkamp was recalled for the remainder of the season on September 2. Prior to September, Surkamp had posted a 6.91 ERA in 23 major league games, but he posted a 1.80 ERA in 11 September appearances. In 35 games, he had a 2–0 record, a 4.81 ERA, 20 strikeouts, 13 walks, and 22 hits allowed in 24 1/3 innings pitched. With Charlotte, he had a 4–5 record, a 4.69 ERA, 86 strikeouts, 20 walks, and 95 hits allowed in 78 2/3 innings over 18 games (11 starts).

In 2015, Surkamp contended for most of the spring to make the White Sox roster, but he was placed on the disabled list at the beginning of the season. Optioned to Charlotte while still on the disabled list, he was designated for assignment on April 26 so the White Sox could purchase Scott Carroll's contract. Outrighted to Charlotte, he made 11 appearances (one start) for the team in 2015, posting a 3–0 record, a 2.81 ERA, 30 strikeouts, nine walks, and 19 hits allowed in 25 2/3 innings.

=== Los Angeles Dodgers ===
On May 22, 2015, Surkamp was traded to the Los Angeles Dodgers in exchange for Blake Smith. He was assigned to the Pacific Coast League's Oklahoma City Dodgers. On July 6, Surkamp had his contract purchased by the Dodgers; reporter Jon Weisman speculated that the team planned to have him pitch long relief behind Yimi García, a relief pitcher making his first start that night in place of an injured Carlos Frías. After García threw the first two innings of that night's game against the Philadelphia Phillies, Surkamp pitched 3 1/3 innings in relief, allowing four earned runs, though Los Angeles ultimately won 10–7. That was his lone appearance before he was designated for assignment on July 8. Returning to Triple-A, he spend the rest of the year in the Pacific Coast League. In 16 appearances (15 starts) for Oklahoma City, he had a 9–3 record, a 3.57 ERA, 70 strikeouts, 23 walks, and 97 hits allowed in 88 1/3 innings pitched. Following the season, he became a free agent.

=== Oakland Athletics ===
On December 13, 2015, Surkamp signed a minor league deal with the Oakland Athletics. Not on the 40-man roster, he began the season with the minor league Nashville Sounds. However, Athletics starter Félix Doubront injured himself in the final game of spring training, and Surkamp was recalled on April 8 to take his spot in the starting rotation. In his first MLB start since 2013, he allowed two runs in 4 2/3 innings on April 8, receiving a no decision in a 3–2 victory over the Seattle Mariners. After four starts, he was sent to Nashville on April 25 because, due to off days, the Athletics only needed four starters and wanted to add another relief pitcher. Called up on May 11, Surkamp made another start, allowing four runs in 2 2/3 innings in a 13–3 loss to the Boston Red Sox before being optioned to Nashville again on May 17 when Jesse Hahn was recalled. He was called up for a third time on May 31 to take Zach Neal's spot in the rotation. "He’s done well at times here...When we talk about pitching depth, he’s definitely one of the guys we consider in that mix as far as starters go," said manager Bob Melvin. Facing the Minnesota Twins on May 31, he allowed three runs in 4 2/3 innings, earning a no decision in a 7–4 victory. Two days later, he was again optioned to Nashville.

When Sean Manaea was placed on the disabled list on June 14, Surkamp was called up for the fourth time to start for the Athletics. He made three starts on this stint, losing the first two. In the third, against the Los Angeles Angels on June 24, he allowed four runs (two earned) in 3 2/3 innings, receiving a no decision, though the Athletics won 7–4. The next day, he was sent to Nashville for the last time, as Dillon Overton was recalled. Surkamp was designated for assignment on June 27. In nine starts for Oakland, he had an 0–5 record, a 6.98 ERA, 22 strikeouts, 21 walks, and 55 hits allowed in 38 2/3 innings. He also made five starts for Nashville, posting a 3–1 record, a 3.07 ERA, 34 strikeouts, 10 walks, and 22 hits allowed in 29 1/3 innings pitched.

=== Hanwha Eagles ===
Surkamp was claimed off waivers by the Texas Rangers on June 29, 2016, and optioned to the Pacific Coast League's Round Rock Express, but he made no appearances for them. On July 7, the Rangers released Surkamp so that he could sign with the Hanwha Eagles of the Korea Baseball Organization. Used as a starter for a little over a month, he was then moved to the bullpen after posting an 0–3 record. In 17 games (eight starts) for Hanwha, Surkamp had a 2–5 record, a 6.31 ERA, 36 strikeouts, 17 walks, and 54 hits allowed in 41 1/3 innings.

== Pitching style ==
Over parts of five seasons in the major leagues, Surkamp appeared in 52 games (16 starts). He had a 4–8 record, a 6.68 ERA, 59 strikeouts, 52 walks, and 122 hits allowed in 95 2/3 innings pitched. He batted and threw left-handed.

Surkamp's fastball averaged 89 miles per hour (143 km/h), and he threw it only 39.9 percent of the time in his major league career, relying more heavily on his secondary pitches. His main one of these was his curveball, which he threw 22.1 percent of the time. Surkamp also threw a sinking fastball, a slider, and a changeup about 10 percent of the time each. In 2015 and 2016, he threw a cutter as well.

== Personal life ==
After his MLB career, Surkamp completed a Bachelor of Science in Business from NC State. He then became a realtor for Comey & Shepherd in the Cincinnati area.
