= Ronald Belisario =

Venezuelan baseball player (born 1982)

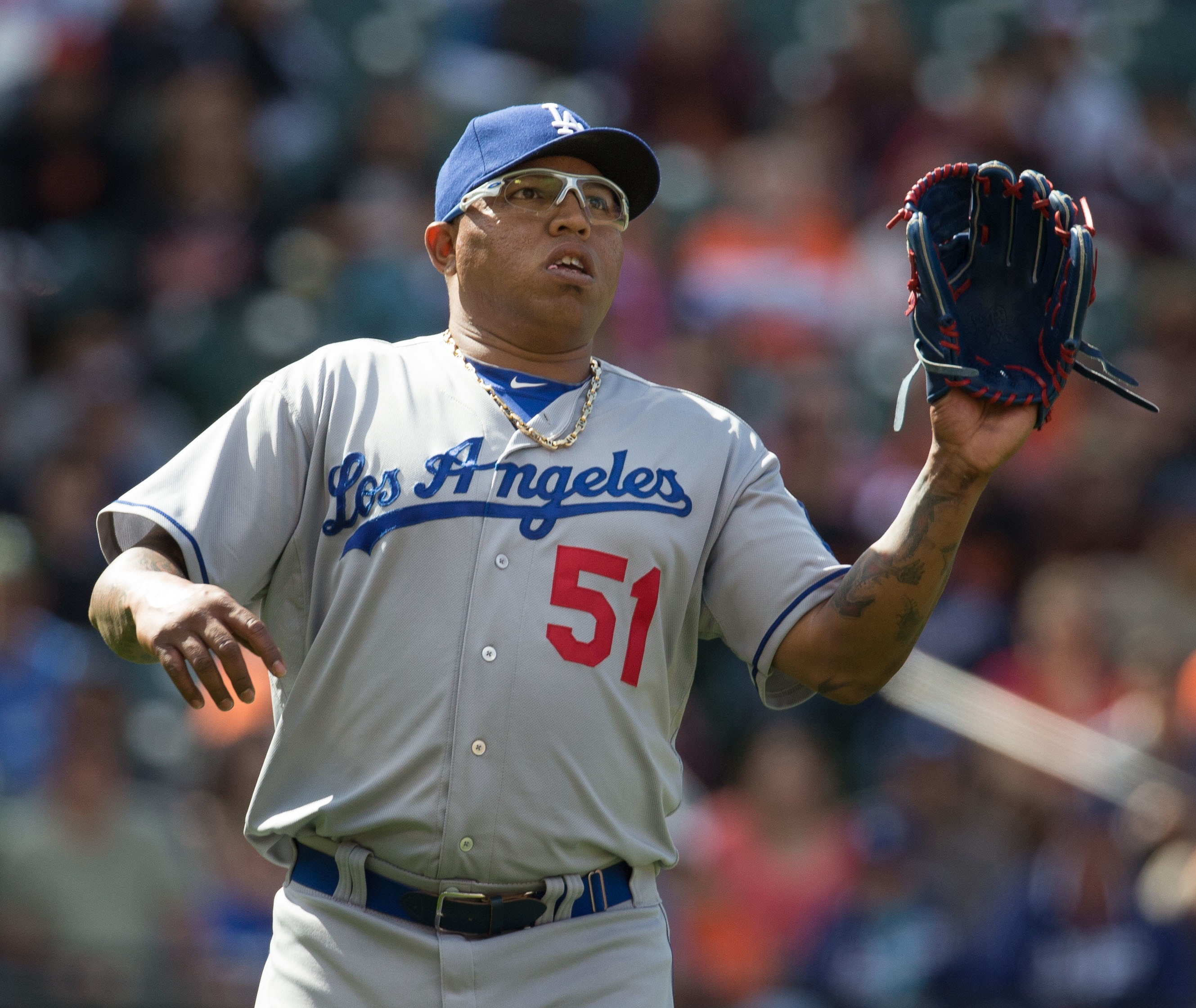
- Belisario with the Los Angeles Dodgers in 2013
- Relief pitcher
- Born: December 31, 1982 (age 43); Maracay, Venezuela
- Batted: Right Threw: Right

MLB debut
- April 7, 2009, for the Los Angeles Dodgers

Last MLB appearance
- June 30, 2015, for the Tampa Bay Rays

Career statistics
- Win–loss record: 24–20
- Earned run average: 3.85
- Strikeouts: 273
- Stats at Baseball Reference

Teams
- Los Angeles Dodgers (2009–2010, 2012–2013); Chicago White Sox (2014); Tampa Bay Rays (2015)

Ronald J. Belisario (last name sometimes spelled Belizario) (born December 31, 1982) is a Venezuelan former professional baseball pitcher. He played in Major League Baseball (MLB) for the Los Angeles Dodgers, Chicago White Sox, and Tampa Bay Rays.

== Professional career ==
=== Florida Marlins ===
Belisario was signed by the Florida Marlins as a 16-year-old amateur free agent in 1998, playing in the rookie-class Venezuelan Summer League in 2000 and rookie-class Gulf Coast League in 2001. He played with various "A" ball teams in 2003–04. He was placed on the Marlins 40 man roster in September 2004 but missed the 2005 season because of undergoing Tommy John surgery on his right elbow. He also missed the 2006 season because of an unspecified suspension.

=== Pittsburgh Pirates ===
After missing two seasons he returned to the mound in the Pittsburgh Pirates farm system in 2007 and remained in the Pirates system for 2008, finally being promoted to AA with the Altoona Curve.

=== Los Angeles Dodgers ===
==== 2009 ====
He signed a minor league contract with an invitation to spring training with the Los Angeles Dodgers for 2009. He was late in showing up for spring training because of some visa problems in his home country, so did not get a chance to compete until late in the spring. However, he pitched well in the last few spring training games and was added to the Dodgers opening day roster on April 6, 2009. Belisario made his Major League debut on April 7, working one scoreless inning as a relief pitcher against the San Diego Padres. He pitched in 69 games for the Dodgers out of the bullpen in 2009, finishing 4–3 with a 2.04 ERA and 64 strikeouts.

==== 2010 ====
Belisario was expected to be on the Dodgers opening day roster for 2010, but again had visa problems in Venezuela. His status was complicated by a driving under the influence charge that had been filed against him in Pasadena, California. He pleaded guilty to a lesser charge through his attorney but did not report to spring training until March 27, at which point he was placed on the restricted list. He did not rejoin the Dodgers until April 21. On July 7, 2010, Belisario was again placed on the restricted list by the Dodgers for unknown reasons. He eventually rejoined the team on August 10. He finished the season 3–1 with a high 5.04 ERA in 55 1/3 innings worked.

==== 2011 ====
For the third year in a row, Belisario did not report on time for spring training in 2011 due to problems in Venezuela. The team reported that he would be absent "indefinitely" and that they did not know when, or even if, he would report for the 2011 season. He was placed on the restricted list to start the season and on April 19, it was revealed that he would not receive a visa in 2011.

On December 20, 2011, Belisario's agent stated that he had gotten a five-year visa and would be in Arizona on time for the start of 2012 spring training. However, it was also revealed that he would have to serve a 25-game suspension at the start of the season for an unspecified violation of MLB's drug policy. In February, Belisario admitted that he had not been able to obtain a visa in 2011 because he had tested positive for cocaine, which had also led to his suspension.

==== 2012 ====
After serving his suspension, and a handful of minor league appearances, Belisario finally rejoined the Dodgers when he was activated off the restricted list on May 3, 2012. He went on to pitch in 68 games for the Dodgers with an 8–1 record and 2.54 ERA.

==== 2013 ====
In March 2013 he represented Venezuela at the 2013 World Baseball Classic. He was suspended for one game on June 14 as a result of his actions during a bench-clearing brawl with the Arizona Diamondbacks on June 11. Belisario appeared in a team high 77 games for the Dodgers in 2013, and was 5–7 with a 3.97 ERA. After the season, Belisario was non-tendered by the Dodgers, becoming a free agent.

=== Chicago White Sox ===
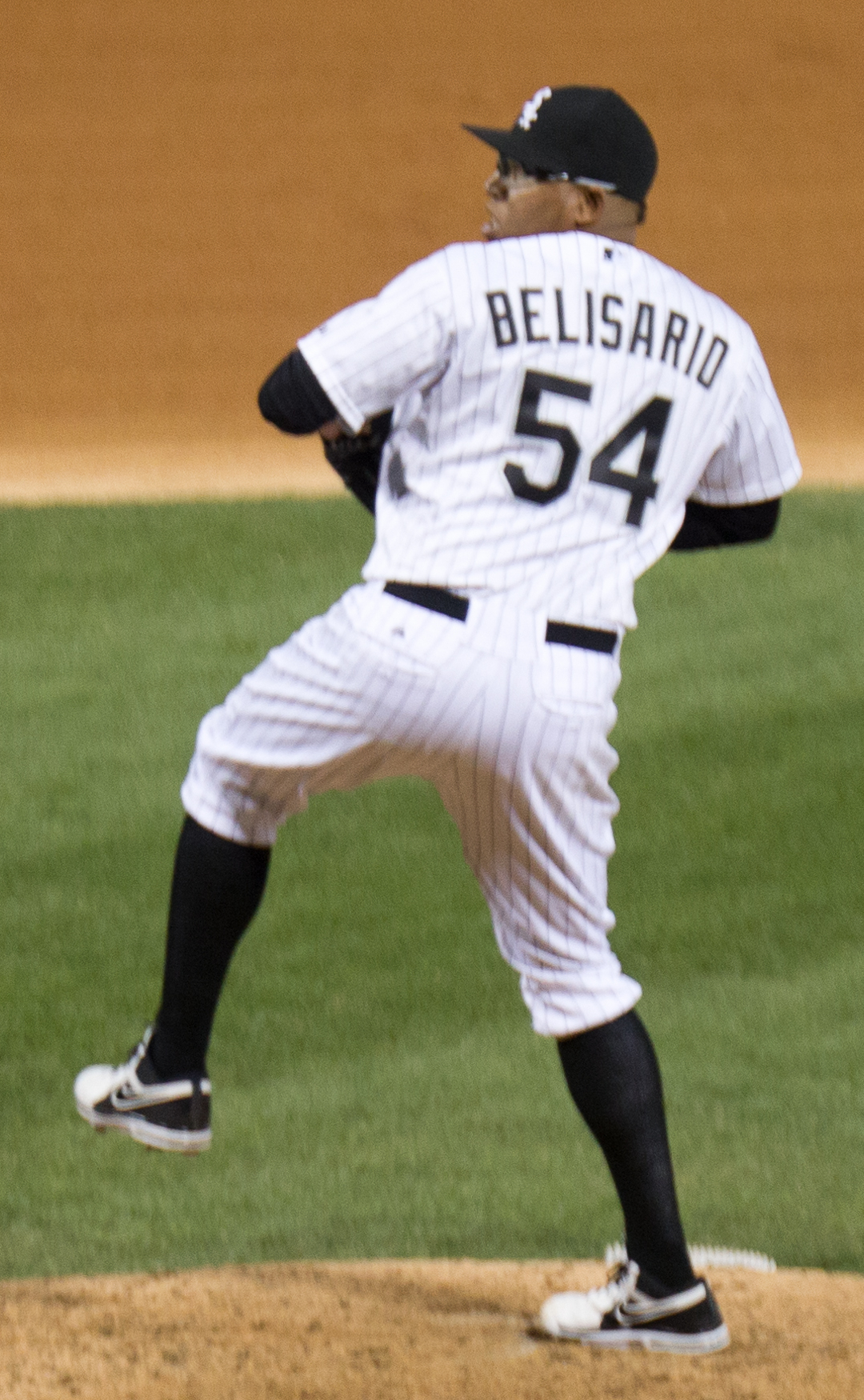
Belisario during his tenure with the Chicago White Sox in 2014

On December 5, 2013, Belisario signed to a one-year, $3 million deal with the Chicago White Sox.

==== 2014 ====
On May 20, Belisario earned his first save as a member of the White Sox. The next day, Belisario was named the new White Sox closer, after it was announced that former closer Matt Lindstrom would need ankle surgery. On May 24, Belisario entered a game in which the White Sox lead the New York Yankees 3–0, after 8 shutout innings by starter John Danks. However, things would quickly go south, as Belisario gave up 3 runs off 4 hits. The White Sox would go to the bottom of the 9th inning now tied 3-3, as Belisario was hailed with boos leaving the field. The Yankees would go on to win the game 4–3 in 10 innings. Despite Belisario's collapse, White Sox manager Robin Ventura remained confident with Belisario as the closer. However, in a game against the Cleveland Indians on May 26, Belisario was passed up on a save opportunity in favor of fellow reliever Scott Downs.

Belisario was designated for assignment by the White Sox on November 20, 2014. He elected free agency on November 28, 2014.

=== Tampa Bay Rays ===
On January 31, 2015, Belisario signed a minor league contract with the Tampa Bay Rays. It had been reported on January 29 that Belisario had agreed to a minor league contract with the Toronto Blue Jays, but the deal fell through for unknown reasons. He made six appearances for Tampa Bay, recording a 7.88 ERA with six strikeouts over eight innings of work. On July 4, Belisario was removed from the 40-man roster and sent outright to the Triple-A Durham Bulls; he elected free agency after clearing waivers.

=== Boston Red Sox ===
On July 12, 2015, Belisario signed a minor league contract with the Boston Red Sox. On August 4, Belisario was released by the Red Sox.

=== Leones de Yucatán ===
On February 16, 2017, Belisario signed with the Leones de Yucatán of the Mexican League for the 2017 season. On the year, he logged a 6–4 record and 2.83 ERA with 40 strikeouts in 47 2/3 innings of work. In 2018, Belisario pitched in 23 games, recording a 3–0 record and 1.50 ERA in 24 innings pitched. In 2019 for Yucatán, Belisario pitched to a 3–7 record and 5.40 ERA with 27 strikeouts in 43 appearances for the club. Belisario was released by the team on February 14, 2020.

=== Piratas de Campeche ===
On June 8, 2021, Belisario signed with the Piratas de Campeche of the Mexican League. In 21 relief appearances, Belisario posted a 2–1 record with a 4.30 ERA and 16 strikeouts. He was released following the season on October 20.

== Pitching style ==
Belisario is a sinkerballer. He throws a hard, heavy sinker with excellent movement at an average of 95 mph on more than 60% of his pitches overall. He also features a four-seam fastball and a slider (to right-handed hitters).

== See also ==
- List of Major League Baseball players from Venezuela
