= Zach Putnam =

American baseball player (born 1987)

Western Michigan Broncos
- Pitcher
- Born: July 3, 1987 (age 39); Rochester, Michigan, U.S.
- Batted: Right Threw: Right

MLB debut
- September 13, 2011, for the Cleveland Indians

Last MLB appearance
- April 22, 2017, for the Chicago White Sox

MLB statistics
- Win–loss record: 10–7
- Earned run average: 3.20
- Strikeouts: 162
- Stats at Baseball Reference

Teams
- Cleveland Indians (2011); Colorado Rockies (2012); Chicago Cubs (2013); Chicago White Sox (2014–2017)

Steven Zachary McGuire Putnam (born July 3, 1987) is an American former professional baseball pitcher. He played in Major League Baseball (MLB) for the Cleveland Indians, Colorado Rockies, Chicago Cubs, and Chicago White Sox.

== Amateur career ==
Born in Rochester, Michigan, Putnam attended Pioneer High School in Ann Arbor, Michigan. At Pioneer, Putnam was the Michigan Gatorade Player of the Year and Mr. Baseball in 2005, and also led the team to a state title in 2004. Putnam then attended the University of Michigan, where he played for the Michigan Wolverines baseball team as a pitcher and outfielder, and was a two-time All-American. In 2007, he played collegiate summer baseball with the Chatham A's of the Cape Cod Baseball League. As a hitter, Putnam hit .307 with 19 home runs and had an overall ERA of 3.36 over three seasons for the Wolverines.

== Professional career ==
=== Cleveland Indians ===
==== Minor leagues ====
Putnam was drafted by the Cleveland Indians in the fifth round of the 2008 Major League Baseball draft. He spent the next four seasons in the Indians' minor league system: 2008 with the Mahoning Valley Scrappers, 2009 with the Kinston Indians and Akron Aeros, 2010 with the Aeros and Columbus Clippers, and 2011 with the Clippers. In 2011, Putnam had a 6–3 record and a 3.65 ERA in 44 games.

==== Major leagues ====
Putnam was a September call-up, and made his major league debut on September 13, 2011. In eight appearances for the Indians during his rookie season, Putnam logged a 1–1 record with a 6.41 ERA and nine strikeouts.

=== Colorado Rockies ===
On January 20, 2012, Putnam was traded to the Colorado Rockies in exchange for Kevin Slowey. Putnam spent most of 2012 with the Triple-A Colorado Springs Sky Sox, but did pitch in two games with the Rockies.

=== Chicago Cubs ===
On November 2, 2012, Putnam was claimed off waivers by the Chicago Cubs. He spent the majority of the season with the Triple–A Iowa Cubs, and struggled to an 18.90 ERA across five major league appearances. On October 9, 2013, Putnam was removed from the 40–man roster and sent outright to Triple–A Iowa. He elected free agency following the season on November 4.

=== Chicago White Sox ===
On November 27, 2013, Putnam signed a minor league contract with the Chicago White Sox. On April 17, 2014, Putnam's contract was purchased, and he was placed on Chicago's 25-man roster; he spent most of the season with the White Sox. Putnam ended establishing career bests in all pitching categories, finishing with a 1.98 ERA in 54 2/3 innings, while also going 6-for-7 in save opportunities.

Putnam made another 49 appearances for Chicago during the 2015 campaign, finishing with a 4.07 ERA and 64 strikeouts across 48 2/3 innings pitched. In 2016, Putnam made 25 appearances out of the bullpen, compiling a 1-0 record and 2.30 ERA with 30 strikeouts across 27 1/3 innings pitched.

Putnam underwent Tommy John surgery on June 27, 2017, causing him to miss the remainder of the season. Prior to that point, he had recorded a 1.04 ERA with nine strikeouts across 8 2/3 innings pitched. On December 1, Putnam was non-tendered by Chicago, making him a free agent.

=== Boston Red Sox ===
On December 14, 2018, Putnam signed a minor league contract with the Boston Red Sox. He suffered a hamstring injury in early March 2019, and spent the season on the roster of the Triple-A Pawtucket Red Sox on the injured list. He elected free agency following the season on November 4.

=== Chicago White Sox (second stint) ===
On March 2, 2020, Putnam signed a minor league contract with the Chicago White Sox. He did not play in a game in 2020 due to the cancellation of the minor league season because of the COVID-19 pandemic. Putnam was released by the White Sox organization on June 26.

== Coaching career ==
On May 4, 2023, Putnam was hired to serve as a volunteer coach at Ball State University.
