= Daniel Webb (baseball) =

American baseball player (1989–2017)

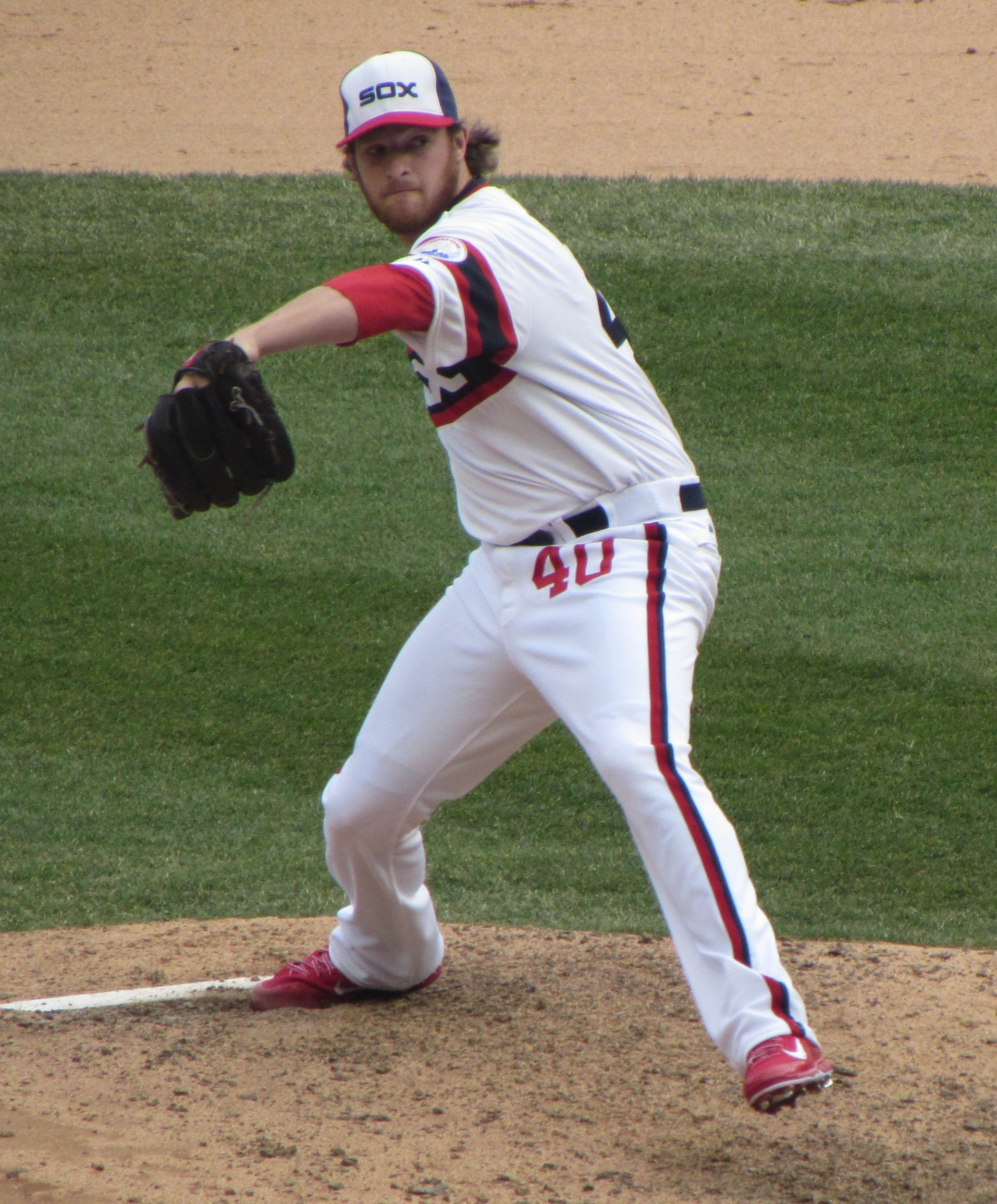
- Webb pitching for the Chicago White Sox in 2014
- Pitcher
- Born: August 18, 1989; Paducah, Kentucky, U.S.
- Died: October 14, 2017 (aged 28); Waverly, Tennessee, U.S.
- Batted: Right Threw: Right

MLB debut
- September 4, 2013, for the Chicago White Sox

Last MLB appearance
- April 28, 2016, for the Chicago White Sox

MLB statistics
- Win–loss record: 7–5
- Earned run average: 4.50
- Strikeouts: 93
- Stats at Baseball Reference

Teams
- Chicago White Sox (2013–2016)

Robert Wyatt McDaniel Webb (August 18, 1989 – October 14, 2017) was an American professional baseball pitcher. He played in Major League Baseball (MLB) for the Chicago White Sox from 2013 through 2016.

== Baseball career ==
=== Toronto Blue Jays ===
Webb attended Heath High School in Paducah, Kentucky. The Arizona Diamondbacks selected him in the 12th round of the 2008 Major League Baseball draft, but he did not sign with Arizona. Webb attended Northwest Florida State College. He was then drafted by the Toronto Blue Jays in the 18th round of the 2009 Major League Baseball draft and signed. He made his professional debut in 2010 for the Low-A Auburn Doubledays, and also pitched for the Single-A Lansing Lugnuts, accumulating a 1–7 record and 4.74 ERA in 68.1 innings of work. Webb split the 2011 season between Lansing and the GCL Blue Jays, registering a 4–5 record and 5.48 ERA in 19 appearances.

=== Chicago White Sox ===
On January 1, 2012, the Blue Jays traded Webb and Myles Jaye to the Chicago White Sox in exchange for Jason Frasor. He spent the 2012 season in Single-A with the Kannapolis Intimidators, recording a 5.81 ERA in 31 appearances. In 2013, Webb appeared in 42 games between the Triple-A Charlotte Knights, the Double-A Birmingham Barons, and the High-A Winston-Salem Dash, posting a 1.87 ERA between the three clubs.

Webb was called up to the majors for the first time on September 2, 2013. He made his debut two days later, pitching an inning of relief against the New York Yankees. He finished his rookie season with a 3.18 ERA in 9 appearances. In 2014, Webb pitched in 57 games for Chicago, recording a 3.99 ERA and 6–5 record. He struggled to a 6.30 ERA in 27 games in 2015, striking out 22 in 30.0 innings of work. He made only one appearance for Chicago in 2016 before undergoing Tommy John surgery on June 10, 2016. On November 3, 2016, Webb was released by the White Sox organization.

== Death ==
On October 14, 2017, Webb died in an all-terrain vehicle (ATV) accident in Humphreys County, Tennessee. Webb's newlywed wife Melissa and two others sustained what the sheriff described as "significant injuries".

== See also ==
- List of baseball players who died during their careers
