= Scott Carroll =

American baseball player (born 1984)

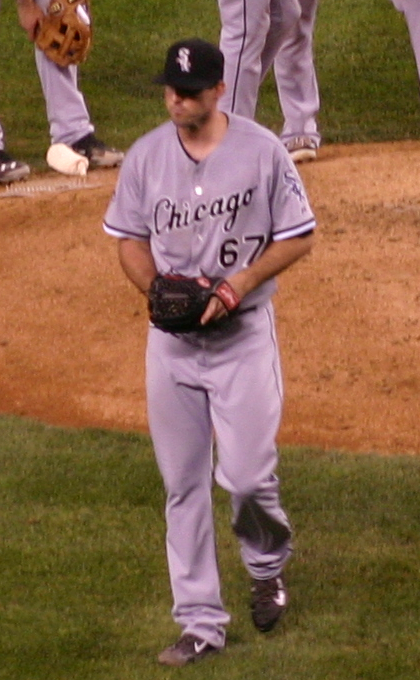
- Carroll with the Chicago White Sox
- Pitcher
- Born: September 24, 1984 (age 41); Kansas City, Missouri, U.S.
- Batted: Right Threw: Right

MLB debut
- April 27, 2014, for the Chicago White Sox

Last MLB appearance
- May 11, 2016, for the Chicago White Sox

MLB statistics
- Win–loss record: 6–11
- Earned run average: 4.60
- Strikeouts: 93
- Stats at Baseball Reference

Teams
- Chicago White Sox (2014–2016)

Scott Alexander Carroll (born September 24, 1984) is an American former professional baseball pitcher. He played in Major League Baseball (MLB) for the Chicago White Sox.

== Early career ==
Carroll attended Liberty High School in Liberty, Missouri, where he was a star quarterback and pitcher. He signed a scholarship with Purdue University to play football. Carroll never received an opportunity for playing time, as he was stuck behind future NFL quarterback Kyle Orton. He later transferred to Missouri State University, where he again was the starting quarterback and a top pitcher on the baseball team. In 2006, he played collegiate summer baseball with the Falmouth Commodores of the Cape Cod Baseball League.

== Professional career ==
=== Cincinnati Reds ===
==== Minor leagues ====
The Cincinnati Reds drafted him in the third round, with the 104th overall selection, of the 2007 Major League Baseball draft. He played six games for Billings, the rookie class team, in 2007. He was 0–1 with a 2.93 ERA. Carroll played for Single-A Dayton and High-A Sarasota in 2008. He was a combined 7–7 with a 3.60 ERA in 9 games for the Dragons and 14 for Sarasota. He played 7 games at Sarasota in 2009, going 2–2 with a 2.68 ERA. In a two-game promotion to Double-A Carolina, he gave up five earned runs in five innings, getting no decisions.

In 2010, he played for the Single-A Lynchburg Hillcats and the Mudcats, going a combined 4–11 with a 3.36 ERA in 5 games at Lynchburg and 20 at Carolina. He received a non-roster invitation to spring training for 2011. After being reassigned to the Triple-A Louisville Bats, Carroll would spend the season there, registering a 7–8 record and 5.39 ERA with 85 strikeouts in 145 1/3 innings pitched across 25 starts. He began the 2012 season with Louisville, making 25 appearances out of the bullpen. On July 9, 2012, Carroll was released by the Reds organization.

=== Chicago White Sox ===
On July 11, 2012, Carroll signed a minor league contract with the Chicago White Sox organization. Carroll pitched in one game with the Double-A Birmingham Barons before being promoted to the Triple-A affiliate Charlotte Knights. Carroll was a combined 4–6 with an ERA of 4.48 and 65 strikeouts in 35 games between Louisville, Birmingham and Charlotte. Carroll spent most of the 2013 season on the disabled list. When activated, he rehabbed at the Rookie-level with the Bristol White Sox and then went to Double-A Birmingham. He finished the 2013 season with a combined record of 0–2 in 11 games (11 starts), 41 0/3 innings, 3.29 ERA, 42 hits, 6 walks and 29 strikeouts. He elected free agency following the season on November 4, 2013.

On January 6, 2014, Carroll re-signed with the White Sox on a new minor league contract. He was assigned to Triple-A Charlotte to begin the year.

==== Major leagues ====
On April 27, 2014, Carroll was selected to the 40-man roster and promoted to the major leagues for the first time. He made his major league debut the same day. In his rookie campaign, Carroll made 26 appearances (19 starts) for Chicago, registering a 5–10 record and 4.80 ERA with 64 strikeouts in 129 1/3 innings pitched. On November 25, 2014, he was designated for assignment following the signing of Adam LaRoche. On December 2, Carroll was non-tendered by Chicago, and became a free agent.

Carroll rejoined the White Sox on another minor league deal signed on January 22, 2015. After beginning the year with Charlotte, Carroll was selected to the active roster on April 26, after Eric Surkamp was designated for assignment. In 18 relief appearances, he registered a 3.44 ERA with 27 strikeouts in 36 2/3 innings of work.

Carroll was optioned to Triple-A Charlotte to begin the 2016 season. In 3 appearances for Chicago, he struggled badly, allowing 3 runs on 2 hits and one walk with 2 strikeouts in 2 1/3 innings pitched. On July 14, 2016, Carroll was removed from the 40-man roster and sent outright to Triple-A.

=== Texas Rangers ===
On July 20, 2016, Carroll was traded to the Texas Rangers in exchange for cash considerations. He made 2 starts for the Triple-A Round Rock Express, but struggled and was demoted to the Double-A Frisco RoughRiders. In 7 starts with Frisco, Carroll posted a 2.92 ERA with 24 strikeouts in 37.0 innings of work. He elected free agency following the season on November 7.

=== Kansas City T-Bones ===
On May 16, 2017, Carroll signed with the Kansas City T-Bones of the American Association of Professional Baseball. In 15 starts for the T-Bones, he registered an 8–3 record and 2.94 ERA with 78 strikeouts in 98.0 innings pitched.

=== Chicago Cubs ===
On August 15, 2017, Carroll's contract was sold to the Chicago Cubs organization. He made 4 starts for the Triple-A Iowa Cubs, registering a 2–1 record and 3.68 ERA with 16 strikeouts in 22.0 innings pitched. He elected free agency following the season on November 6.

=== Kansas City T-Bones (second stint) ===
On June 2, 2018, Carroll signed with the Kansas City T-Bones of the independent American Association of Professional Baseball. In 5 starts, Carroll posted a 2.12 ERA with 21 strikeouts in 29 2/3 innings of work.

=== Toros de Tijuana ===
On July 3, 2018, Carroll signed with the Toros de Tijuana of the Mexican League. Carroll made 4 starts for Tijuana, and recorded a 4.70 ERA with 7 strikeouts in 15 1/3 innings pitched. He was released by the team on July 27.
