= Scott Snodgress =

American baseball player (born 1989)

- Pitcher
- Born: September 20, 1989 (age 36); Fontana, California, U.S.
- Batted: Left Threw: Left

MLB debut
- September 3, 2014, for the Chicago White Sox

Last MLB appearance
- September 21, 2014, for the Chicago White Sox

MLB statistics
- Win–loss record: 0–0
- Earned run average: 15.43
- Strikeouts: 1
- Stats at Baseball Reference

Teams
- Chicago White Sox (2014)

Scott Andrew Snodgress (born September 20, 1989) is an American former professional baseball pitcher. He played in Major League Baseball (MLB) for the Chicago White Sox in 2014.

== Amateur career ==
A native of Yucaipa, California, Snodgress attended Yucaipa High School and played college baseball at Stanford University. In 2010, he played collegiate summer baseball in the Cape Cod Baseball League for the Yarmouth-Dennis Red Sox.

== Professional career ==
=== Chicago White Sox (2011-2014) ===
He was drafted by the Chicago White Sox in the 5th round of the 2011 MLB draft. He started his career in 2011 with the Rookie Level Great Falls Voyagers. He finished the 2011 season a record of 3-3 in 16 games (12 starts), 59 1/3 innings, 3.34 ERA, 61 hits, 17 walks and 68 strikeouts. Snodgress started the 2012 season with Single-A Kannapolis Intimidators but was later promoted to High-A Winston-Salem Dash. He finished the 2012 season with a combined record of 7-3 in 27 games (27 starts), 141 innings, 3.00 ERA, 112 hits, 64 walks, and 128 strikeouts.

Before the start of the 2013 season, Snodgress was ranked the White Sox #6 prospect. Through the 2013 season at Double-A Birmingham Barons, Snodgress pitched in 26 games (26 starts) with a record of 11-11. In 143 2/3 innings of work at Birmingham, Snodgress had a 4.70 ERA, 146 hits, 59 walks, and 90 strikeouts.

On August 31, 2014, the White Sox purchased Snodgress' contract and promoted him to the major leagues. He made his major league debut on September 3 against the Minnesota Twins.

On December 2, 2014, the White Sox declined to tender Snodgress a contract and he became a free agent.

=== Los Angeles Angels ===
On December 10, 2014, the Los Angeles Angels signed Snodgress to a minor league contract with an invite to 2015 spring training. He was released on July 27, 2015.

=== San Diego Padres ===
Snodgress signed a minor league contract with the San Diego Padres on February 15, 2016. He was released in March 2016.

=== Southern Maryland Blue Crabs ===
On April 8, 2016, Snodgress signed with the Southern Maryland Blue Crabs of the Atlantic League of Professional Baseball.

=== Chicago White Sox (second stint) ===
On February 18, 2017, Snodgress signed a minor league contract with the Chicago White Sox organization. Snodgress pitched in 23 games for the Double–A Birmingham Barons, registering a 4.86 ERA with 46 strikeouts and one save in 37 innings pitched. He elected free agency following the season on November 6.
