= Jake Petricka =

American baseball player (born 1988)

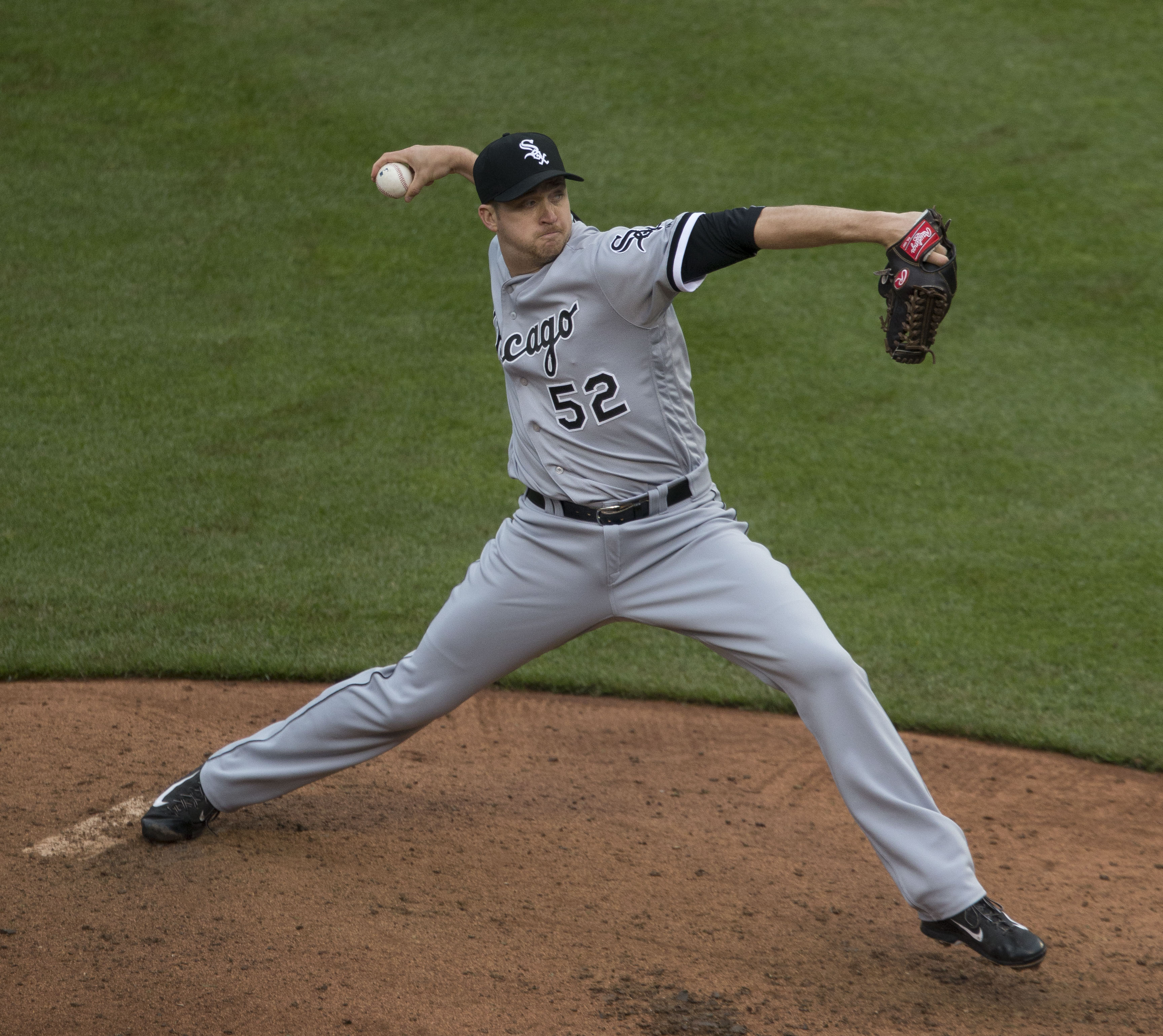
- Petricka with the Chicago White Sox
- Pitcher
- Born: June 5, 1988 (age 37); Northfield, Minnesota, U.S.
- Batted: Right Threw: Right

MLB debut
- August 22, 2013, for the Chicago White Sox

Last MLB appearance
- September 21, 2021, for the Los Angeles Angels

MLB statistics
- Win–loss record: 10–13
- Earned run average: 4.24
- Strikeouts: 183
- Stats at Baseball Reference

Teams
- Chicago White Sox (2013–2017); Toronto Blue Jays (2018); Milwaukee Brewers (2019); Los Angeles Angels (2021)

Jacob Steven Petricka (born June 5, 1988) is an American former professional baseball pitcher. He played in Major League Baseball (MLB) for the Chicago White Sox, Toronto Blue Jays, Milwaukee Brewers, and Los Angeles Angels.

== Career ==
=== Chicago White Sox ===
Petricka played college baseball at Iowa Western Community College from 2006 to 2008 and Indiana State University before he was drafted by the Chicago White Sox in the 2nd round of the 2010 Major League Baseball draft. He started his career in 2010 with the Rookie Level Bristol White Sox and Single–A Kannapolis Intimidators. He finished the 2010 season with a combined record of 2–5 in 17 games (8 starts), 44 1/3 innings, 3.05 ERA, 38 hits, 15 walks and 48 strikeouts. In 2011, Petricka split time between Bristol, Kannapolis and High–A Winston-Salem Dash. He finished the 2011 season with a combined record of 7–8 in 23 games (22 starts), 113 1/3 innings, 3.65 ERA, 114 hits, 39 walks and 99 strikeouts.

Petricka suffered a back injury that forced him to miss time during the 2011 and struggle in 2012. In 2012, he started the season with Winston-Salem but was later promoted to Double-A Birmingham Barons. He finished the 2012 season with a combined record of 8–8 in 29 games (29 starts), 140 1/3 innings, 5.39 ERA, 156 hits, 81 walks and 111 strikeouts. Before the start of the 2013 season, he was ranked the White Sox #20 prospect.

Petricka is no longer a starter, having been moved to the bullpen for the 2013 season. He started the season at Birmingham pitching 21 games (1 start) with a record of 3–0. In 39 1/3 innings of work at Birmingham, Petricka had a 2.06 ERA, 36 hits, 18 walks and 41 strikeouts. He was then promoted to the Triple-A Charlotte Knights.

The White Sox promoted Petricka on August 17, 2013. On August 22, he made his Major League debut against the Kansas City Royals. He pitched two-thirds of an inning and earned his first career Major League victory during the 4–3 Sox win in 12 innings. He finished the 2013 season with a 3.26 ERA in 16 games. From 2014 to 2015, Petricka was a major asset for the White Sox' bullpen, posting an ERA of 2.96 and 3.62 respectively in each year. He also recorded 14 saves in 2014. On July 6, 2016, he was moved to the 60-day disabled list.

Petricka made 27 appearances for the White Sox during the 2017 season, pitching to a 1-1 record and 7.01 ERA with 26 strikeouts across 25 2/3 innings pitched. On December 1, 2017, Petricka was non-tendered by Chicago, making him a free agent.

=== Toronto Blue Jays ===
On February 8, 2018, Petricka signed a minor league contract with the Toronto Blue Jays that included an invitation to spring training. He was added to the 40-man roster and activated on May 4. He was optioned to the Triple-A Buffalo Bisons the next day, and recalled again on May 8 when Roberto Osuna was placed on administrative leave. Petricka split time between the Blue Jays bullpen and the Bisons, logging 45 2/3 innings for the Blue Jays in 41 appearances. On November 2, 2018, he cleared waivers and entered free agency.

=== Milwaukee Brewers ===
On January 12, 2019, Petricka signed with the Milwaukee Brewers. He was designated for assignment on April 27, 2019, and outrighted on May 1.

=== Texas Rangers ===
Petricka was traded to the Texas Rangers for cash considerations or a player to be named later on June 14, 2019. In 24 relief outings for the Triple–A Nashville Sounds, he compiled a 5.06 ERA with 29 strikeouts and 4 saves. Petricka elected free agency following the season on November 4.

=== Toronto Blue Jays (second stint) ===
On February 7, 2020, Petricka signed a minor league contract with the Toronto Blue Jays. He did not play in a game in 2020 due to the cancellation of the minor league season because of the COVID-19 pandemic. Petricka was released by the Blue Jays organization on September 9.

=== High Point Rockers ===
On March 16, 2021, Petricka signed with the High Point Rockers of the Atlantic League of Professional Baseball. He recorded one scoreless inning in his only appearance for High Point.

=== Los Angeles Angels ===
On June 1, 2021, Petricka's contract was purchased by the Los Angeles Angels organization. He was then assigned to the Triple-A Salt Lake Bees. After appearing in 19 games for Salt Lake, posting a 3.69 ERA with 32 strikeouts, Petricka's contract was selected by the Angels on August 25. In 7 games for the Angels, he struggled to a 15.00 ERA with 8 strikeouts across 6 innings of work. On September 16, Petricka was designated for assignment following the activation of Alex Cobb from the injured list. He was released by the organization on September 21.

=== Minnesota Twins ===
On March 31, 2022, Petricka signed a minor league contract with the Minnesota Twins. In 21 appearances for the Triple–A St. Paul Saints, he compiled a 4.18 ERA with 22 strikeouts and 2 saves across 23 2/3 innings pitched. On July 29, Petricka was released by the Twins organization.
