= Tyler Flowers =

American baseball player (born 1986)

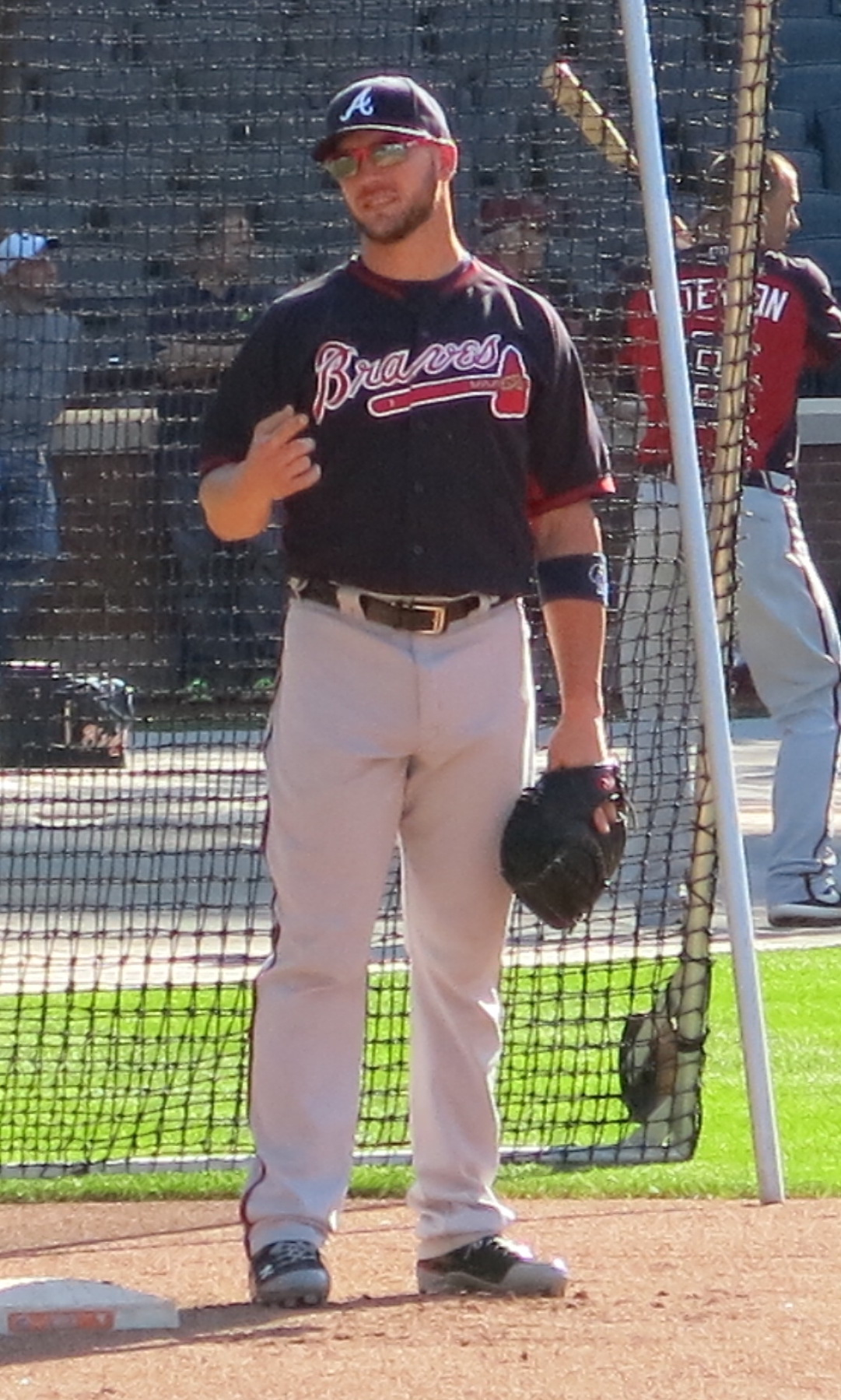
- Flowers with the Atlanta Braves in 2016
- Catcher
- Born: January 24, 1986 (age 40); Roswell, Georgia, U.S.
- Batted: Right Threw: Right

MLB debut
- September 3, 2009, for the Chicago White Sox

Last MLB appearance
- September 27, 2020, for the Atlanta Braves

MLB statistics
- Batting average: .237
- Home runs: 86
- Runs batted in: 301
- Stats at Baseball Reference

Teams
- Chicago White Sox (2009–2015); Atlanta Braves (2016–2020)

Cole Tyler Flowers (born January 24, 1986) is an American former professional baseball catcher. Flowers was drafted by the Braves in the 33rd round of the 2005 MLB draft. He played in Major League Baseball (MLB) for the Chicago White Sox from 2009, when he made his MLB debut, to 2015 and for the Atlanta Braves from 2016 to 2020.

== Amateur career ==
Flowers attended Blessed Trinity Catholic High School in Roswell, Georgia, where he played American football as a linebacker and fullback. In baseball, Flowers was a catcher, infielder and pitcher. Flowers was inducted into the Blessed Trinity Hall of Fame in January 2015.

He then attended Chipola College, a state college in Marianna, Florida, and played first base for the college baseball team.

== Professional career ==
=== Atlanta Braves ===
Flowers was drafted by the Atlanta Braves in the 33rd round of the 2005 MLB draft.

In 2006 Flowers played 34 games in his first professional season for the Rookie League Danville Braves. He hit .279 with 36 hits, 5 home runs and 16 RBIs, playing 22 games at first and eight as a catcher. Flowers tested positive for steroids and served a 50-game suspension starting in the 2006 season.

In 2007, he was promoted to A-ball with the Rome Braves. Flowers played in 106 games with a batting average of .298 with 116 hits, 12 homers, 70 RBIs and a .488 slugging percentage. He began transitioning to catcher that season, after the starting and substitute catchers suffered injuries in the same game.

In 2008 Flowers played for the Myrtle Beach Pelicans of Advanced-A. He played 122 games, all at catcher. He had a .288 batting average, .427 on-base percentage, and .494 slugging percentage. He caught 28% of base stealers, as 112 runners stole bases against him and he caught 43.

=== Chicago White Sox ===
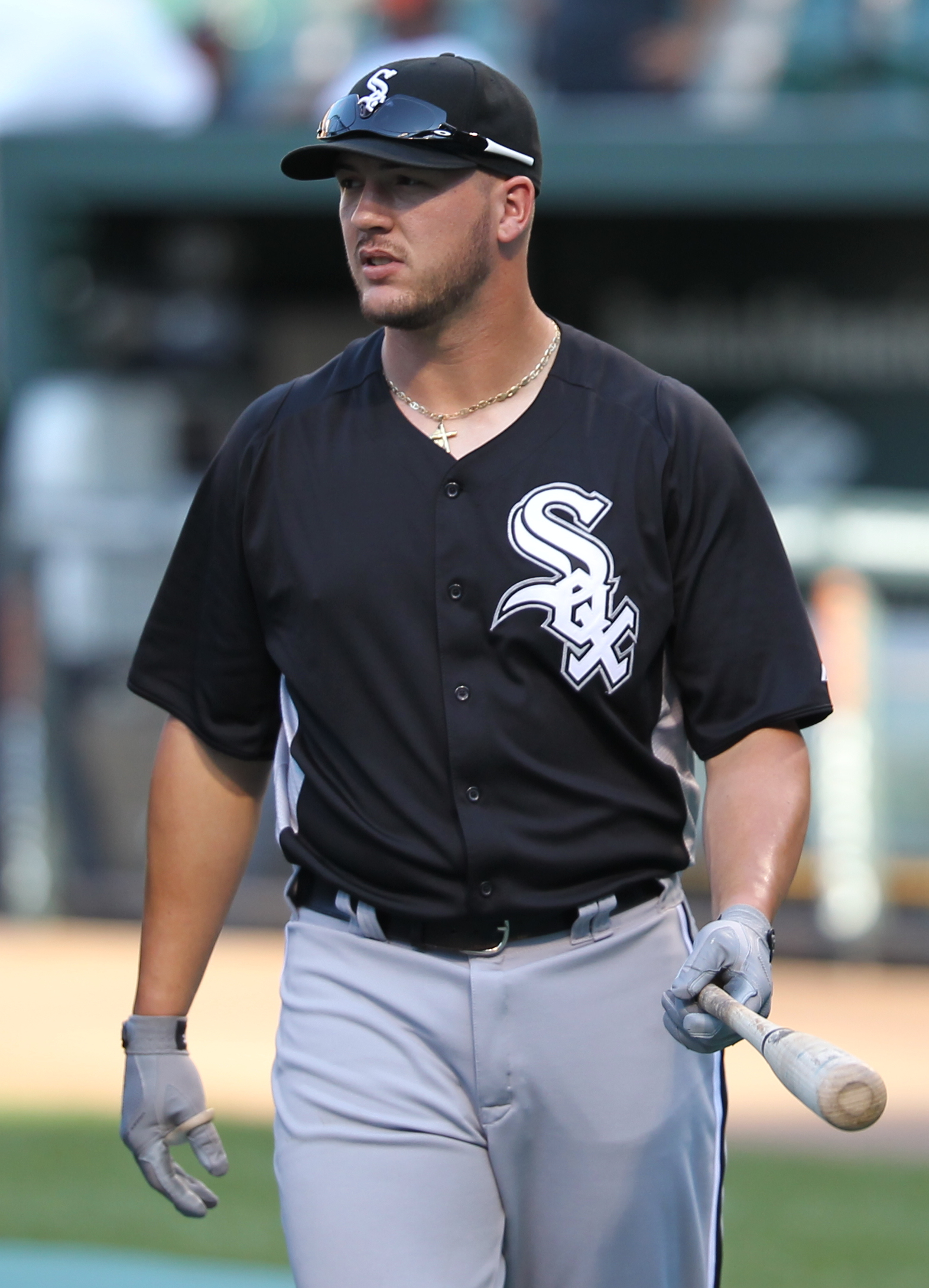
Flowers with the White Sox in 2011

On December 4, 2008, Flowers and fellow Braves prospects Brent Lillibridge, Jonathan Gilmore and Santos Rodriguez were traded to the Chicago White Sox for Javier Vázquez and Boone Logan.

On September 1, 2009, Flowers was called up from the Triple–A Charlotte Knights after hitting .297 with 15 home runs and 56 RBI between the Double–A Birmingham Barons and Charlotte. He made his major league debut on September 3 and recorded his first major league hit on September 19, against the Kansas City Royals. In 10 games, Flowers finished the 2009 season batting .188 with no home runs and no RBIs.

Flowers started the 2010 season at Triple–A Charlotte. He hit .220 with 16 home runs and 53 RBI in 346 at-bats before getting another September call up. Flowers played in 8 games with the White Sox and only had 1 hit in 11 at-bats.

Flowers again started the 2011 season at Triple–A Charlotte. There he hit .261 with 15 home runs and 32 RBI in 222 at-bats. He was then called up in July to serve as the backup to A. J. Pierzynski after Ramón Castro was placed on the disabled list. Flowers became the starting catcher in mid-August after an injury to Pierzynski. Flowers hit his first Major League home run on August 13, 2011, against Luke Hochevar and the Kansas City Royals. On August 28, 2011, while facing Jason Vargas and the Seattle Mariners, Flowers hit his first Major League grand slam.

With the departure of veteran catcher A. J. Pierzynski in the offseason, Flowers became the starting catcher for the White Sox in 2013. An offseason injury adversely affected his offensive production, and Flowers was demoted to backup as the White Sox brought up one of their top prospects, Josh Phegley. Flowers left in early September to have season-ending shoulder surgery. After the season, Flowers signed a one-year deal for $950,000 with Chicago, avoiding arbitration. Flowers was named the starting catcher to begin the 2014 season. On May 26, 2014, Flowers received his first career ejection by Ron Kulpa for arguing a pitch that appeared low. He finished the year with a .241 batting average, 15 home runs and 50 runs batted in.

Flowers and the White Sox on January 16, 2015, agreed to a one-year deal for $2.675 million avoiding arbitration. On April 25, 2015, Flowers was fined an undisclosed amount for his role in a brawl against the Kansas City Royals but was not suspended any games. On defense, in 2015 he had the weakest arm strength (77.3) of all major league catchers. The White Sox did not tender Flowers a contract for the 2016 season, making him a free agent.

=== Second stint with Braves ===
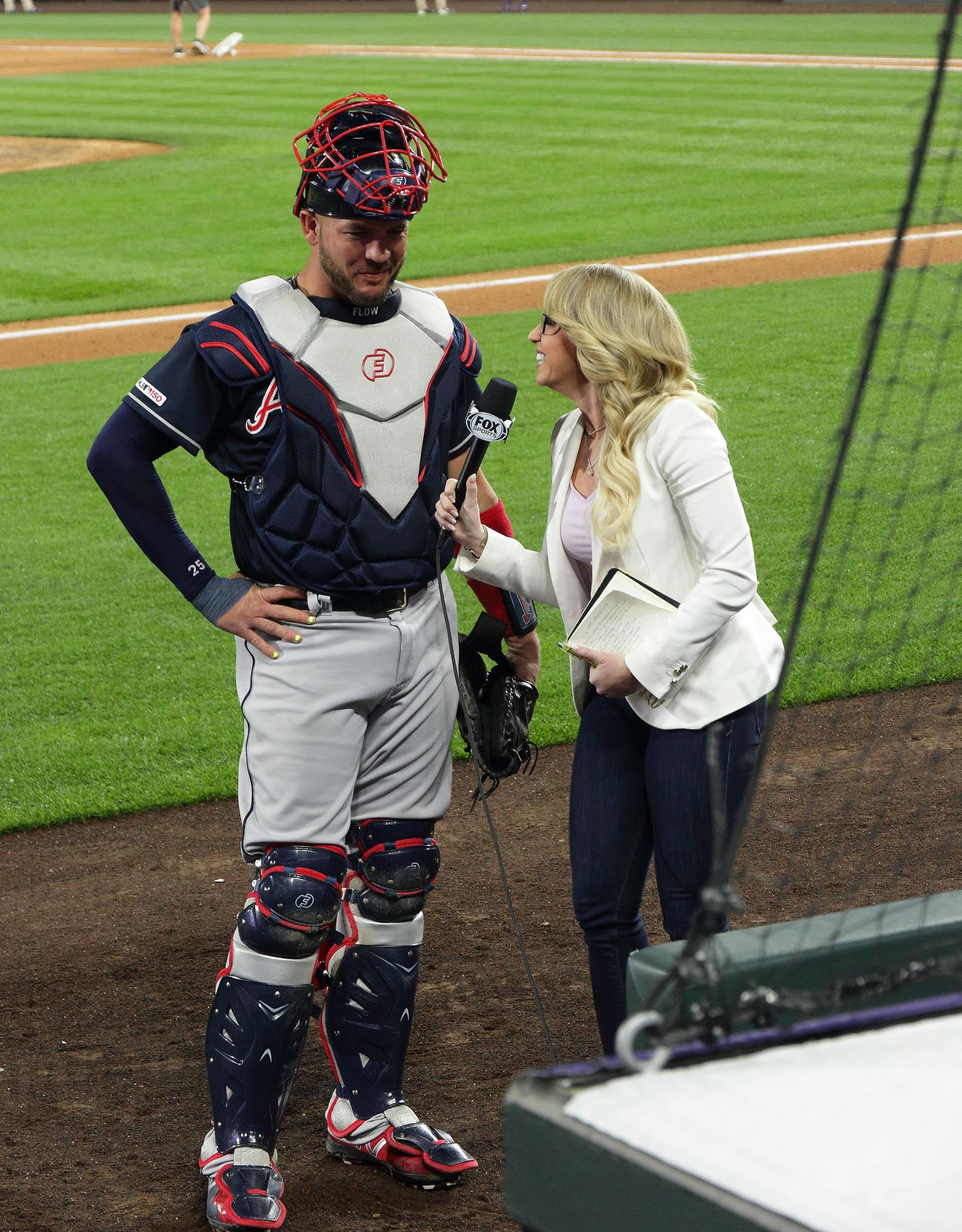
Kelsey Wingert interviewing Tyler Flowers after a game vs the Rockies at Coors Field

The Atlanta Braves signed Flowers to a two-year contract worth $5.3 million on December 16, 2015. In July 2016, Miami Marlins pitcher A. J. Ramos hit Flowers' left hand with a pitch. The injury was exacerbated in a series against the Chicago White Sox, and it was announced during the All-Star break that Flowers would miss six weeks of the season. He was reactivated on August 17. In 2016, he caught only 5% of base stealers, as 60 runners stole bases against him and he caught 3.

Though he was hit by several pitches throughout the course of the 2017 season, Flowers did not miss many games until he was injured by a foul tip on August 30. Shortly after his reinstatement from the 10-day disabled list, Flowers was hit by a pitch in a game against the Washington Nationals on September 13. The incident caused a wrist injury, though Flowers was unaware of its severity until having surgery on October 9. On defense, in 2017 he had the weakest arm strength (74.7) of all major league catchers. In 2017, he caught 23% of base stealers, as 55 runners stole bases against him (3rd-most in the league) and he caught 16. The Braves picked up Flowers' team option at the end of the 2017 season. He agreed to a one-year extension for the 2019 season on August 28, 2018, worth $4 million. The contract included a club option for the 2020 season worth $6 million.

In 2018 he batted .227/.341/.359 with 8 home runs and 30 RBIs. On defense, in 2018 he again had the weakest arm strength (74.7) of all major league catchers. He caught 23% of base stealers, as 44 runners stole bases against him and he caught 13.

In 2019, he batted .229/.319/.413 with 36 runs, 11 home runs and 34 RBIs. On defense he allowed the most passed balls of all major league catchers, with 16. In November 2019, the Braves declined Flowers' option, instead agreeing to a one-year, $4 million contract for the 2020 season.

In 2020 he batted .217/.325/.348 with one home run and five RBIs in 69 at bats. He became a free agent after the 2020 season.

In the 2020/2021 offseason, Flowers took a non-playing position with the Braves, working with the team's analytics department. On May 4, 2021, Flowers signed a minor league contract with the Braves organization. However, after discovering that he had developed a third degenerative disc in his back, Flowers retired from professional baseball on May 14, 2021.

== Personal life ==
Flowers is married to Nancy, a former high school classmate, with whom he has five children. When he is off the field, he sports a puka shell necklace and each shell represents one of his children.
