= Taylor Thompson (baseball) =

American baseball player (born 1987)

- Pitcher
- Born: June 18, 1987 (age 39); Montgomery, Alabama
- Batted: Right Threw: Right

MLB debut
- July 20, 2014, for the Chicago White Sox

Last MLB appearance
- August 3, 2014, for the Chicago White Sox

MLB statistics
- Win–loss record: 0–0
- Earned run average: 10.13
- Strikeouts: 4
- Stats at Baseball Reference

Teams
- Chicago White Sox (2014)

Taylor F. Thompson (born June 18, 1987) is an American former professional baseball pitcher. He previously played for the Chicago White Sox of Major League Baseball (MLB).

== Career ==
Thompson played college baseball at Auburn University from 2007 to 2009. He was drafted by the Chicago White Sox in the 25th round of the 2008 Major League Baseball draft, but did not sign and returned to Auburn.

=== Chicago White Sox ===
He was then drafted again by the White Sox in the 44th round of the 2009 Draft.

Thompson was called up to the majors for the first time on July 20, 2014 and made his Major League debut that same day against the Houston Astros pitching an inning and a third giving up one hit and striking out two.

=== Oakland Athletics ===
He was claimed off waivers by the Oakland Athletics on November 4, 2014. He was designated for assignment on August 14, 2015, after spending much of the season on the disabled list and making only eight minor league appearances. He was released prior to the 2016 season.

=== Bridgeport Bluefish ===
On April 12, 2016, Thompson signed with the Bridgeport Bluefish of the Atlantic League of Professional Baseball. He became a free agent after the 2016 season.
