= 2014 New York Yankees season =

Season for the Major League Baseball team the New York Yankees

2014 New York Yankees
- League: American League
- Division: East
- Ballpark: Yankee Stadium
- City: New York, New York
- Record: 84–78 (.519)
- Divisional place: 2nd
- Owners: Yankee Global Enterprises
- General managers: Brian Cashman
- Managers: Joe Girardi
- Television: YES Network; WWOR-TV (Michael Kay, Ken Singleton, several others as analysts)
- Radio: WFAN / WFAN-FM; New York Yankees Radio Network (John Sterling, Suzyn Waldman)

The 2014 New York Yankees season was the 112th season for the New York Yankees franchise. The Yankees began the season on April 1 at Minute Maid Park against the Houston Astros, and finished on September 28 at Fenway Park against the Boston Red Sox. They finished in second place in the American League East with an 84–78 record, which was their worst record since 1992. The Yankees failed to make the playoffs for the second year in a row, and for the third time in twenty years.

The 2014 season is also notable for being team captain Derek Jeter's final season as a professional baseball player, also, beginning that year the team's radio broadcasts switched stations, being now aired via WFAN 660 AM and its FM simulcast WFAN-FM, which assumed the duty of being the new flagship radio stations for the Yankees Radio Network.

== Off-season transactions ==
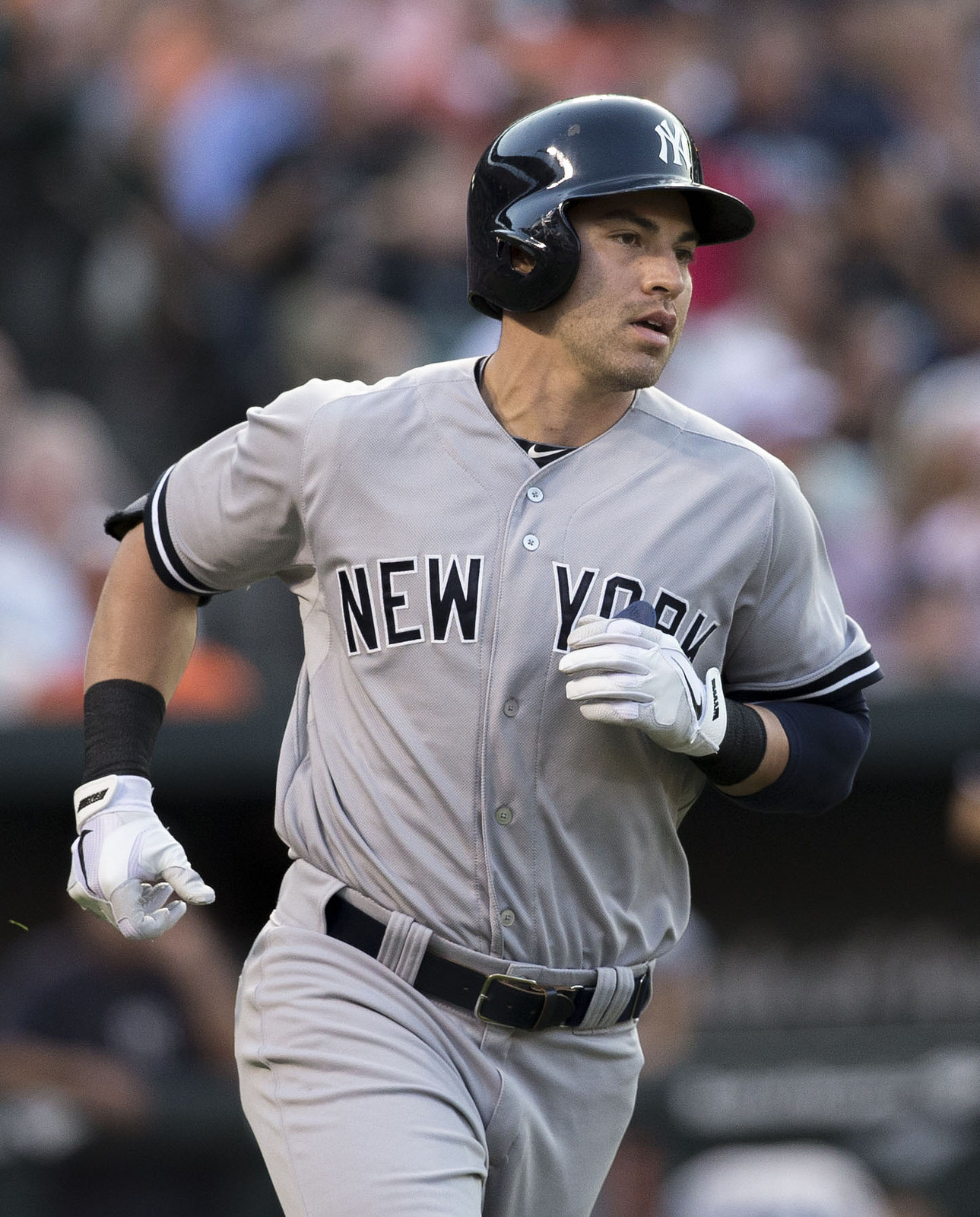
Jacoby Ellsbury joined the Yankees after spending his whole previous career with the Boston Red Sox.

On October 9, 2013, the Yankees agreed to a new contract with free agent manager Joe Girardi for four years and $16 million. At the time, the contract was the second most expensive contract for a manager behind Mike Scioscia of the Los Angeles Angels of Anaheim. On November 1, the Yankees announced they made a new deal with shortstop Derek Jeter for one year and $12 million over the original $9.5 million option in the original deal signed in 2010. Three weeks later, on November 18, the club announced they had reached a deal with free agent utility infielder Brendan Ryan originally reported to be for one year and worth $1 million. However, on December 2, the club and Ryan both announced that the deal was for two years and $5 million with a mutual option for 2016. The same day, the Yankees non-tendered utility infielder Jayson Nix, third baseman David Adams and pitcher Matt Daley, who all became free agents. On December 3, the Yankees announced that the first of their high-profile signings, former Atlanta Braves catcher Brian McCann had made a five-year, $85 million deal official. The deal also had a vesting option for a sixth year worth $15 million. Just hours prior to the deal, the club traded catcher Chris Stewart to the Pittsburgh Pirates for a player to be named later. Just two days later, the Yankees held a press conference for the signing of McCann, who would wear number 34 in honor of Eric O'Flaherty and Derek Lowe, former teammates on the Braves.

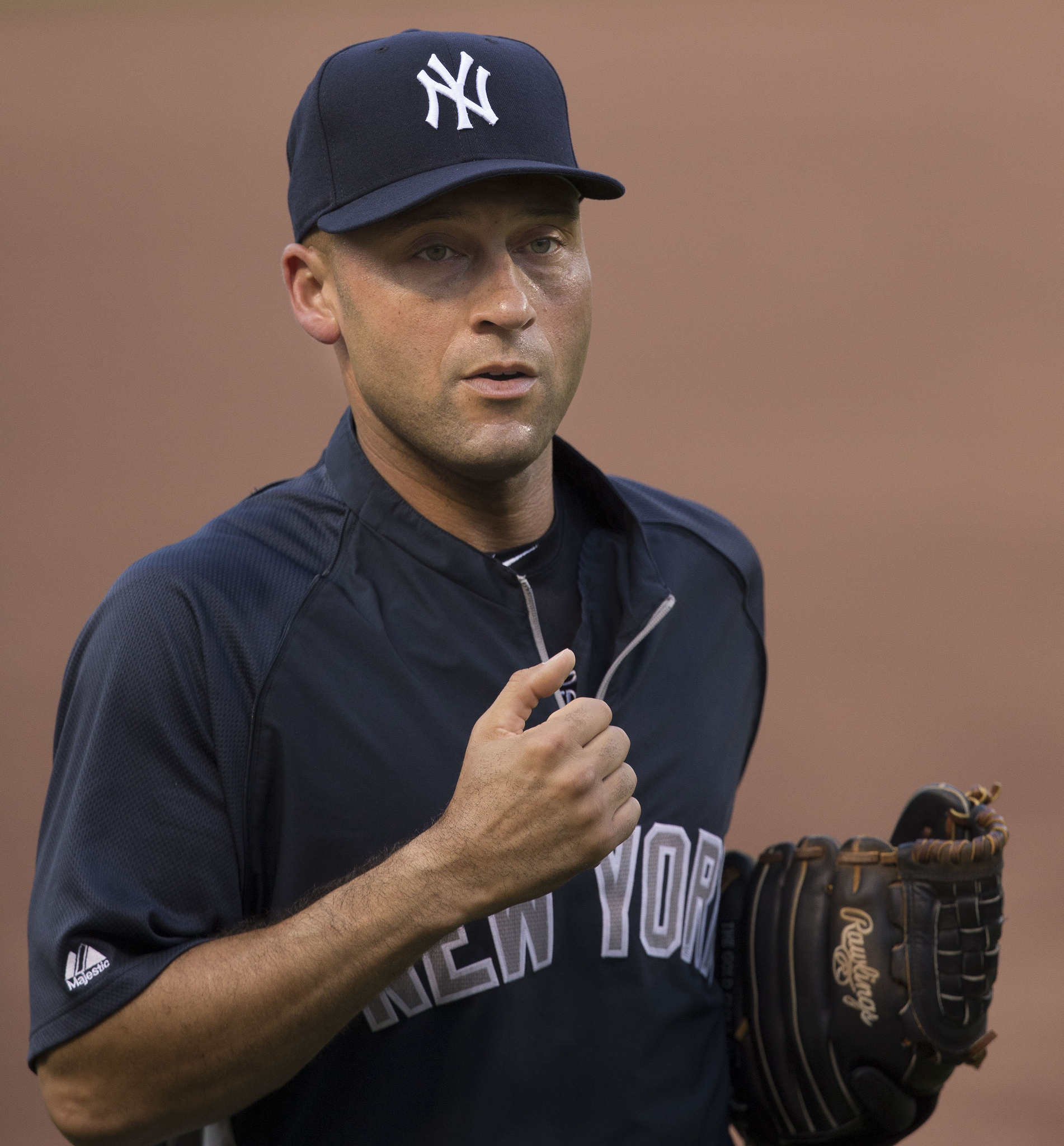
Derek Jeter announced that 2014 would be his final season just before the start of spring training. 2014 would be a retirement season for Jeter as 2013 was for Mariano Rivera.

On December 3, just hours after the McCann signing was made official, it was reported that the Yankees had agreed to a deal with former Boston Red Sox outfielder Jacoby Ellsbury for seven years and $153 million. The deal, which contained an option for 2021, was announced on December 7, after Ellsbury passed a physical. A press conference to unveil Ellsbury was held planned on December 13. On December 4, the Yankees announced they had reached a deal with free agent utility player Kelly Johnson for one year and $3 million. On December 6, former Yankee and free agent Robinson Canó accepted a ten-year, $240 million deal with the Seattle Mariners with a full no-trade clause. The deal to leave the Yankees was the third largest in big league history, behind Alex Rodriguez's deals with the Yankees in 2007 and the Texas Rangers in 2000 and tied Albert Pujols's $240 million deal with the Angels. Later that day, Curtis Granderson, a member of the club from 2010–2013, was announced to join the New York Mets on a four-year, $60 million deal.

While Cano and Granderson left the Yankees on December 6, the Yankees also made two signings on that date; the team reached a one-year, $16 million deal with pitcher Hiroki Kuroda, which became official the following day. Also on December 6, the Yankees reached an agreement to sign free agent outfielder Carlos Beltrán on a three-year, $45 million deal. On December 13, the Yankees introduced Ellsbury at a press conference, adorning the number 22. Four days later, the Yankees announced a pair of signings, bringing infielder Brian Roberts to the Bronx on a one-year, $2 million deal, along with reliever Matt Thornton on a two-year, $7.5 million contract. On December 19, the Yankees contract with Beltran became official, and the Yankees introduced him to the public at a press conference the next day. In order to make room on the roster, Brett Marshall was designated for assignment on December 19, and claimed by the Chicago Cubs off waivers four days later. On January 10, 2014, the Yankees made the Thornton signing official, and in order to clear room on the roster, the Yankees designated Vernon Wells for assignment. On January 11, a panel of three, led by Major League Baseball arbitrator Fredric Horowitz, announced that the group had decided 2–1 to reduce the suspension on Alex Rodriguez from 211 games to 162 games and the postseason. The next day, the Yankees signed infielder Scott Sizemore to a minor league deal, with an invitation to Spring training. On January 14, the Yankees announced in a press release that the deal with Brian Roberts was made official, taking Alex Rodriguez's vacated space on the 40-man roster.

On January 22, 2014, it was announced that the Yankees had agreed to a deal with free agent/Rakuten Golden Eagles starting pitcher Masahiro Tanaka. The seven-year, $155 million deal which contains an opt-out clause at the 2017–2018 offseason was made official the same day, as the Yankees chose to not have Tanaka take a physical examination. In order to make room on the roster, left-handed pitcher David Huff was designated for assignment. On January 24, the San Francisco Giants announced that they had acquired Huff off waivers for cash considerations. On February 11, the Yankees held a press conference for Tanaka, in front of over 200 members of the media, including reporters from Japan, marking the biggest press conference for the Yankees since the one held for Hideki Matsui in 2003. A day later, Derek Jeter announced on his Facebook page that he would retire after the 2014 season. At a press conference held on February 19, Jeter mentioned that the decision was not about the injury he sustained in the 2012 American League Championship Series but that he felt it was time to move on.

After the beginning of spring training on February 14, the Yankees reportedly signed free agent relief pitcher Andrew Bailey to a minor league deal on February 22. On February 24, the Yankees announced that they had extended outfielder Brett Gardner to a 4-year, $52 million deal, which would keep him on the Yankees until 2018 with a club option for 2019.

The Yankees began the 2014 season without longtime starting pitcher Andy Pettitte and longtime closer Mariano Rivera, each of whom retired following the 2013 season.

	Subtractions	Additions
Players	RHP Mariano Rivera (retired); LHP Andy Pettitte (retired); RHP Phil Hughes (signed with Twins); C Chris Stewart (trade with Pirates); 1B/RF Lyle Overbay (signed with Brewers); IF Eduardo Núñez (trade with Twins); IF Robinson Canó (signed with Mariners); IF Jayson Nix (signed with Rays); OF Curtis Granderson (signed with Mets); OF Vernon Wells (released); IF Mark Reynolds (signed with Brewers); RHP Joba Chamberlain (signed with Tigers); IF Kevin Youkilis (signed with Golden Eagles); RHP Brett Marshall (waiver claim by Cubs); LHP David Huff (waiver claim by Giants); LHP Boone Logan (signed with Rockies); IF David Adams (signed with Indians)	OF Jacoby Ellsbury (free agent); IF Brian Roberts (free agent); OF Carlos Beltrán (free agent); RHP Masahiro Tanaka (free agent); LHP Matt Thornton (free agent); C Brian McCann (free agent); RHP Andrew Bailey (free agent); IF Scott Sizemore (free agent); IF Kelly Johnson (free agent)
Personnel	Bullpen coach Mike Harkey	Bullpen coach Gary Tuck

== Regular season ==
The Yankees unexpectedly designated Eduardo Núñez for assignment in order to call up Yangervis Solarte on April 1, only hours before the Yankees would begin their season at Minute Maid Park, home of the Houston Astros. The newly acquired pitcher from Japan, Masahiro Tanaka made his Major League debut and Yankees debut on April 4 against the Toronto Blue Jays at the Rogers Centre.

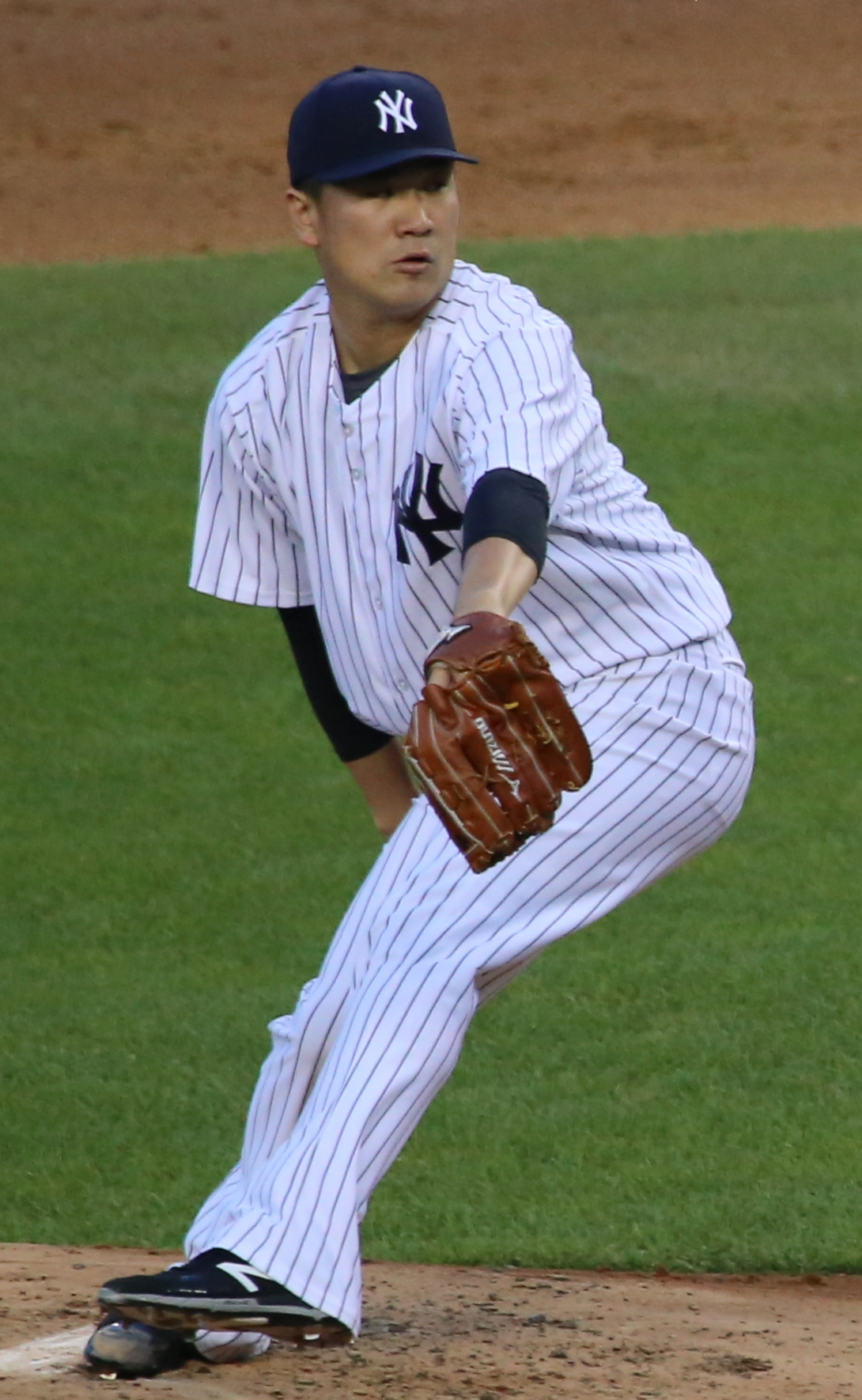
Masahiro Tanaka, acquired from Japan, had a great year.

Hosting the Boston Red Sox on April 10, pitcher Michael Pineda earned a win for the Yankees over their rivals. However, the game sparked a controversy as analysts were quick to discover a foreign substance, most likely pinetar, on Pineda's neck. The Red Sox chose not to appeal it but Major League Baseball agreed to talk to the Yankees organization about it. In Pineda's defense, the pitcher claimed he had dirt on his hand. The substance, which was discovered in the third inning, disappeared by the fifth inning.

On April 17, pitcher CC Sabathia earned a win on the road against the Tampa Bay Rays 10–2; during the game, Sabathia was on the mound for the third time witnessing a triple play as Sean Rodriguez bounced a ball to Yangervis Solarte (playing third base). The play was turned 5–4–3.

A few days later, during a terrible outing against the Rays, Iván Nova felt discomfort in his right arm. Nova would later be confirmed to be undergoing successful season-ending surgery.

On April 23, Michael Pineda started another game against the Red Sox. This game was away at Fenway Park. Not unlike the start against the Boston Red Sox on April 10, Pineda had another foreign substance on his body. Shockingly, it was a large amount of the substance on his neck. This occurred in the second inning, as the Red Sox manager John Farrell decided to appeal against the pitcher. As a result, umpire Gerry Davis examined the substance on Michael Pineda's neck. The substance was indeed pine tar, an illegal foreign substance. Thus, Davis immediately ejected Michael Pineda from the game and Pineda was put on a 10-game suspension. The controversy triggered analysts to discuss the possibility of Major League Baseball changing the rules and making a small amount of pine tar available for pitchers to use in very cold weathers to gain a grip on the ball. However, the substance would not be allowed in decent weather. Analysts believe the rule, if looked into, could be made effective as of the 2015 season. Pineda took responsibility for cheating, however, and claimed that he would learn from his mistake.

On May 20 in a 1–6 loss to the Chicago Cubs, Masahiro Tanaka picked up his first regular season loss in professional baseball since 2012. He went 34–0 during this streak.

Through June 18, the Yankees led the majors with a 20–11 record in games decided by two runs or fewer.

The team has been plagued by lack of offense.

A crisis surrounding CC Sabathia struck the Yankees within the first few days of July. Sabathia, who was rumored to be progressing greatly in his rehab stint in the minors (coming back from an injury suffered in the month of May), unexpectedly awoke one morning to find his knee swollen quite seriously. As a result, Sabathia is scheduled to meet Dr. James Andrews on July 14. Manager Joe Girardi confirmed that Sabathia's season is most likely over. After the All Star Game, Sabathia's season was confirmed to be over as he would be undergoing knee surgery performed by the Los Angeles Dodgers's physician and would not return until 2015.

In early July, Alfonso Soriano was designated for assignment and later released by the Yankees after the struggling outfielder and designated hitter failed to break out of his hitting slump. Soriano proved to spend almost all of his part of the season failing to produce both offensively and defensively. A few days before, the highly perceived Yangervis Solarte was also optioned back to the Minors due to his obtained confidence issues that resulted because of an offensive slump. He was recalled to the Majors not long after.

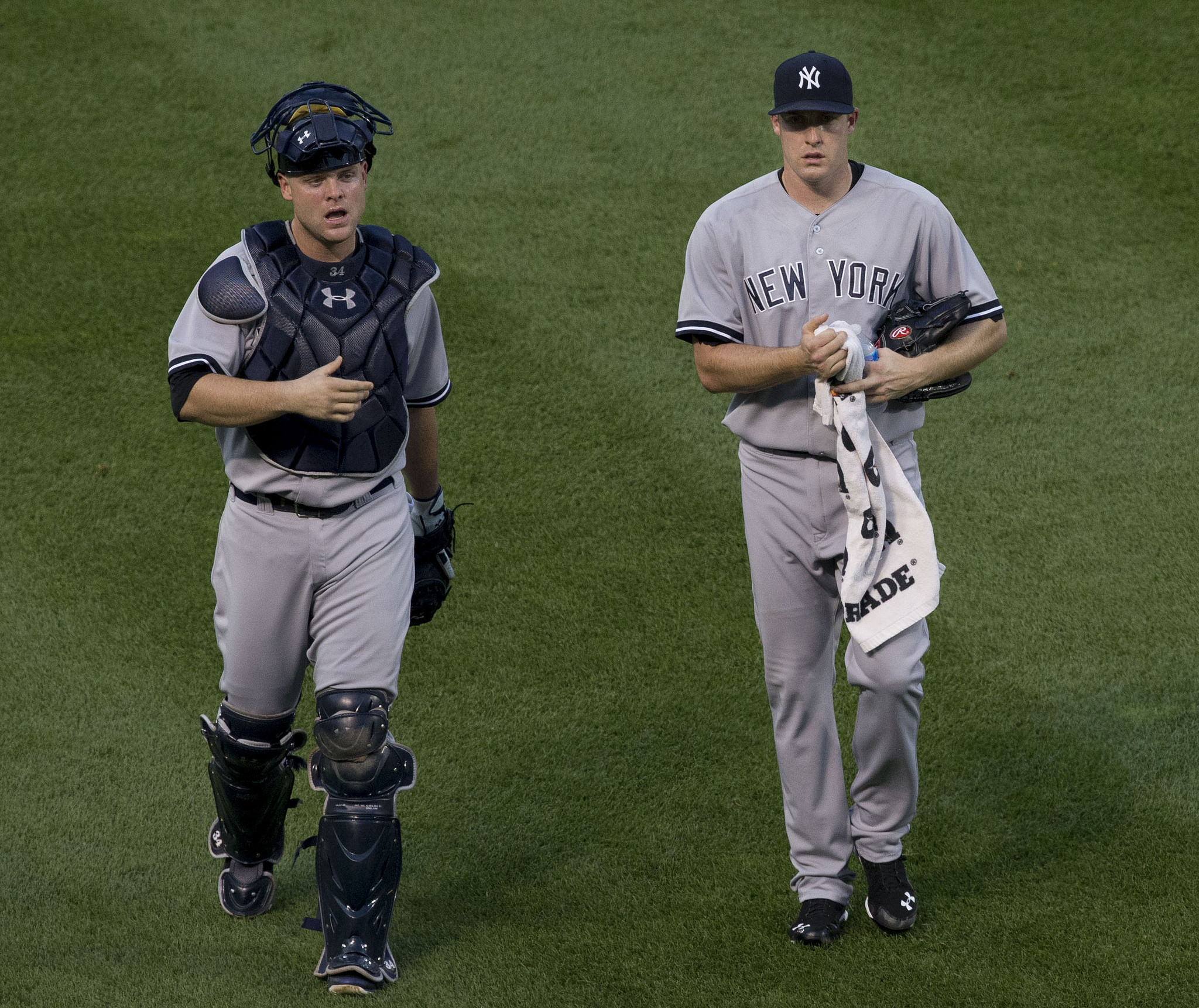
Brian McCann and Chase Whitley before a game against the Orioles on July 13.

On July 6, the Yankees acquired right handed pitcher Brandon McCarthy from the Arizona Diamondbacks for left handed pitcher Vidal Nuño.

On July 3, Derek Jeter, Masahiro Tanaka, and Dellin Betances were all named American League All-Stars. Koji Uehara of the Boston Red Sox was selected to replace Tanaka on the All Star roster.

After an outing against the Cleveland Indians on July 8, the fourth of the original five starting rotation pitchers was put on the disabled list. Masahiro Tanaka, who was a most valuable asset to the Yankees and an All-Star, complained about feeling discomfort in his pitching elbow to the Yankees. As a result, Tanaka was flown to New York City from Cleveland to get an MRI. He was quickly sent to Seattle to get examined as the most efficient doctors were all engaged in a meeting in Seattle. It was announced that Tanaka had partially torn his collateral ligament in his right elbow. None of the doctors who met with Tanaka suggested Tommy John surgery and instead a more subtle rehab was suggested for the pitcher. This would take six weeks to complete before returning to the mound. Masahiro Tanaka was leading the Majors in wins. He was also on pace to contend for American League Rookie of the Year, the American League Cy Young Award, and possibly even the American League MVP. With the injury, Hiroki Kuroda was the last standing starter and became the Yankees ace.

As a result of the injuries to all the starting pitchers, GM Brian Cashman pursued trades with other organizations in hopes to acquire replacement starters. As a result, Cashman acquired Brandon McCarthy from Arizona and Jeff Francis from the Oakland Athletics. Francis was later designated for assignment.

On July 22, at 12:01 AM, Jack Curry reported that a deal between the Yankees and San Diego Padres had been confirmed that sent Yangervis Solarte and minor league right-handed pitcher Rafael De Paula to San Diego in exchange for third basemen Chase Headley and cash considerations.

Before the trade deadline at 4:00 EST on July 31, the Yankees' general manager Brian Cashman made a few moves to bolster the Yankees offense. The Yankees traded prospect Peter O'Brien to Arizona for Martín Prado. Also, for the first time since 1997, the Yankees made a trade with the very active Boston Red Sox that sent Kelly Johnson to Boston for Stephen Drew. Earlier that day, the Yankees acquired pitcher Esmil Rogers from Toronto via claiming him off from waivers after he was designated for assignment by Toronto. The Yankees unconditionally released Scott Sizemore to make room for Rogers. The Yankees designated Brian Roberts to make room for Stephen Drew. Drew would replace Roberts at second base, a position he has never played before at the professional level (including the Minors). Drew claimed he last played second base as a sophomore in high school for a varsity team.

After Masahiro Tanaka began his rehab and strengthening programs in late August so he could come back and pitch before the end of season, he was sent back to New York City on August 29 with arm soreness. He later returned in September, but he finished the season 13–5.

Derek Jeter ended up finishing his career in style including a walk off RBI win against the Baltimore Orioles at home and a big performance against the Red Sox at Fenway Park to finish the season.

In Derek Jeter's final game he finished his career with a RBI infield single at Fenway Park to drive in Ichiro Suzuki and was taken out of the game after his hit. The Yankees went on to win 9 to 5.

The Yankees did not make the playoffs for the second year in a row, as they failed to produce enough the last month of the season.

=== Roster ===
2014 New York Yankees
Roster
Pitchers: 91 Alfredo Aceves; 68 Dellin Betances; 40,57 Bruce Billings; 64 César Cabral; 26 Chris Capuano; 38,48 Preston Claiborne; 40 Matt Daley; 53 Jeff Francis; 39,61 Shane Greene; 57 Rich Hill; 55 David Huff; 27 Shawn Kelley; 18 Hiroki Kuroda; 55 Wade LeBlanc; 63,64 Chris Leroux; 38 Brandon McCarthy; 53 Jim Miller; 65 Bryan Mitchell; 47 Iván Nova; 57 Vidal Nuño; 48,88 Josh Outman; 41 David Phelps; 35 Michael Pineda; 63 José Ramírez; 30 David Robertson; 64 Chaz Roe; 53 Esmil Rogers; 52 CC Sabathia; 19 Masahiro Tanaka; 48 Matt Thornton; 43 Adam Warren; 39 Chase Whitley	Catchers: 29 Francisco Cervelli; 34 Brian McCann; 66 J. R. Murphy; 45,53,62 Austin Romine; Infielders: 45 Dean Anna; 33 Stephen Drew; 12 Chase Headley; 2 Derek Jeter; 33 Kelly Johnson; 67 José Pirela; 14 Martín Prado; 14 Brian Roberts; 17 Brendan Ryan; 24,45 Scott Sizemore; 26 Yangervis Solarte; 25 Mark Teixeira; 45 Zelous Wheeler	Outfielders: 24 Zoilo Almonte; 36 Carlos Beltrán; 22 Jacoby Ellsbury; 11 Brett Gardner; 40 Eury Pérez; 63 Antoan Richardson; 12 Alfonso Soriano; 31 Ichiro Suzuki; 24 Chris Young	Manager: 28 Joe Girardi; Coaches: -- Trey Hillman (special assistant); 50 Mick Kelleher (first base); 54 Kevin Long (hitting); 56 Tony Peña (bench); 88 Román Rodríguez (bullpen catcher); 58 Larry Rothschild (pitching); 59 Rob Thomson (third base); 60 Gary Tuck (bullpen)

=== Opening Day lineup ===
22	Jacoby Ellsbury	CF
2	Derek Jeter	SS
36	Carlos Beltrán	RF
34	Brian McCann	C
25	Mark Teixeira	1B
12	Alfonso Soriano	DH
11	Brett Gardner	LF
14	Brian Roberts	2B
33	Kelly Johnson	3B
52	CC Sabathia	P

== Player stats ==
=== Batting ===
Note: G = Games played; AB = At bats; R = Runs; H = Hits; 2B = Doubles; 3B = Triples; HR = Home runs; RBI = Runs batted in; SB = Stolen bases; BB = Walks; AVG = Batting average; SLG = Slugging average

Player	G	AB	R	H	2B	3B	HR	RBI	SB	BB	AVG	SLG
Derek Jeter	145	581	47	149	19	1	4	50	10	35	.256	.313
Jacoby Ellsbury	149	575	71	156	27	5	16	70	39	49	.271	.419
Brett Gardner	148	555	87	142	25	8	17	58	21	56	.256	.422
Brian McCann	140	495	57	115	15	1	23	75	0	32	.232	.406
Mark Teixeira	123	440	56	95	14	0	22	62	1	58	.216	.398
Carlos Beltrán	109	403	46	94	23	0	15	49	3	37	.233	.402
Ichiro Suzuki	143	359	42	102	13	2	1	22	15	21	.284	.340
Brian Roberts	91	317	40	75	16	4	5	21	7	28	.237	.360
Yangervis Solarte	75	252	26	64	14	0	6	31	0	30	.254	.381
Alfonso Soriano	67	226	22	50	15	0	6	23	1	6	.221	.367
Kelly Johnson	77	201	21	44	9	2	6	22	2	23	.219	.373
Chase Headley	58	191	28	50	8	0	6	17	3	29	.262	.398
Francisco Cervelli	49	146	18	44	11	1	2	13	1	11	.301	.432
Stephen Drew	46	140	7	21	8	0	3	15	0	13	.150	.271
Martín Prado	37	133	18	42	9	0	7	16	1	3	.316	.541
Brendan Ryan	49	114	5	19	4	0	0	8	0	4	.167	.202
John Ryan Murphy	32	81	7	23	4	0	1	9	0	4	.284	.370
Chris Young	23	71	9	20	8	0	3	10	1	7	.282	.521
Zelous Wheeler	29	57	6	11	0	0	2	5	0	2	.193	.298
Zoilo Almonte	13	36	2	5	0	0	1	3	1	0	.139	.222
José Pirela	7	24	6	8	1	2	0	3	0	1	.333	.542
Dean Anna	12	22	3	3	1	0	1	3	0	2	.136	.318
Antoan Richardson	13	16	2	5	0	0	0	1	5	1	.313	.313
Scott Sizemore	6	16	3	5	2	0	0	4	0	0	.313	.438
Austin Romine	7	13	2	3	1	0	0	1	0	0	.231	.308
Eury Pérez	4	10	2	2	0	0	0	0	1	0	.200	.200
Pitcher totals	162	23	0	2	0	0	0	0	0	0	.087	.087
Team totals	162	5497	633	1349	247	26	147	591	112	452	.245	.380

=== Pitching ===
Note: W = Wins; L = Losses; ERA = Earned run average; G = Games pitched; GS = Games started; SV = Saves; IP = Innings pitched; H = Hits allowed; R = Runs allowed; ER = Earned runs allowed; BB = Walks allowed; SO = Strikeouts

Player	W	L	ERA	G	GS	SV	IP	H	R	ER	BB	SO
Hiroki Kuroda	11	9	3.71	32	32	0	199.0	191	91	82	35	146
Masahiro Tanaka	13	5	2.77	20	20	0	136.1	123	47	42	21	141
David Phelps	5	5	4.38	32	17	1	113.0	115	62	55	46	92
Brandon McCarthy	7	5	2.89	14	14	0	90.1	91	35	29	13	82
Dellin Betances	5	0	1.40	70	0	1	90.0	46	15	14	24	135
Shane Greene	5	4	3.78	15	14	0	78.2	81	38	33	29	81
Adam Warren	3	6	2.97	69	0	3	78.2	63	27	26	24	76
Vidal Nuño	2	5	5.42	17	14	0	78.0	86	52	47	26	60
Michael Pineda	5	5	1.89	13	13	0	76.1	56	18	16	7	59
Chase Whitley	4	3	5.23	24	12	0	75.2	94	44	44	18	60
Chris Capuano	2	3	4.25	12	12	0	65.2	67	34	31	19	55
David Robertson	4	5	3.08	63	0	39	64.1	45	23	22	23	96
Shawn Kelley	3	6	4.53	59	0	4	51.2	45	26	26	20	67
CC Sabathia	3	4	5.28	8	8	0	46.0	58	31	27	10	48
David Huff	3	1	1.85	30	0	0	39.0	34	10	8	17	28
Esmil Rogers	2	0	4.68	18	1	0	25.0	22	13	13	10	23
Matt Thornton	0	3	2.55	46	0	0	24.2	23	9	7	6	20
Preston Claiborne	3	0	3.00	18	0	0	21.0	24	9	7	10	16
Iván Nova	2	2	8.27	4	4	0	20.2	32	19	19	6	12
Alfredo Aceves	1	2	6.52	10	0	0	19.1	23	14	14	4	16
Matt Daley	0	1	5.02	13	0	0	14.1	12	11	8	6	10
Bryan Mitchell	0	1	2.45	3	1	0	11.0	10	3	3	3	7
José Ramírez	0	2	5.40	8	0	0	10.0	11	6	6	7	10
Rich Hill	0	0	1.69	14	0	0	5.1	6	1	1	3	9
Bruce Billings	0	0	9.00	1	0	0	4.0	4	4	4	1	7
Josh Outman	0	0	0.00	9	0	0	3.2	2	0	0	0	2
Jim Miller	0	0	20.25	2	0	0	2.2	7	6	6	2	2
Chris Leroux	0	1	22.50	2	0	0	2.0	7	5	5	2	3
Chaz Roe	0	0	9.00	3	0	0	2.0	3	3	2	3	4
Jeff Francis	1	0	5.40	2	0	0	1.2	2	1	1	0	1
Wade LeBlanc	0	0	18.00	1	0	0	1.0	2	2	2	1	0
César Cabral	0	0	27.00	4	0	0	1.0	4	3	3	2	2
Dean Anna	0	0	18.00	1	0	0	1.0	3	2	2	0	0
Team totals	84	78	3.75	162	162	48	1453.0	1392	664	605	398	1370

== Season standings ==
=== American League East ===
AL East
Team	W	L	Pct.	GB	Home	Road
Baltimore Orioles	96	66	.593	—	50‍–‍31	46‍–‍35
New York Yankees	84	78	.519	12	43‍–‍38	41‍–‍40
Toronto Blue Jays	83	79	.512	13	46‍–‍35	37‍–‍44
Tampa Bay Rays	77	85	.475	19	36‍–‍45	41‍–‍40
Boston Red Sox	71	91	.438	25	34‍–‍47	37‍–‍44

=== American League Wild Card ===
Division leaders
Team	W	L	Pct.
Los Angeles Angels	98	64	.605
Baltimore Orioles	96	66	.593
Detroit Tigers	90	72	.556

Wild Card teams (Top 2 teams qualify for postseason)
Team	W	L	Pct.	GB
Kansas City Royals	89	73	.549	+1
Oakland Athletics	88	74	.543	—
Seattle Mariners	87	75	.537	1
Cleveland Indians	85	77	.525	3
New York Yankees	84	78	.519	4
Toronto Blue Jays	83	79	.512	5
Tampa Bay Rays	77	85	.475	11
Chicago White Sox	73	89	.451	15
Boston Red Sox	71	91	.438	17
Houston Astros	70	92	.432	18
Minnesota Twins	70	92	.432	18
Texas Rangers	67	95	.414	21

=== Record vs. opponents ===
2014 American League record Source: MLB Standings Grid – 2014
Team	BAL	BOS	CWS	CLE	DET	HOU	KC	LAA	MIN	NYY	OAK	SEA	TB	TEX	TOR	NL
Baltimore	—	11–8	5–1	3–4	1–5	4–3	3–4	4–2	4–3	13–6	2–4	5–2	12–7	6–1	11–8	12–8
Boston	8–11	—	4–3	2–5	1–5	4–3	6–1	2–5	4–2	7–12	3–4	1–5	9–10	4–2	7–12	9–11
Chicago	1–5	3–4	—	9–10	9–10	3–3	6–13	1–5	9–10	2–5	4–3	3–4	5–2	2–4	5–2	11–9
Cleveland	4–3	5–2	10–9	—	8–11	5–2	10–9	2–5	11–8	4–3	2–4	2–4	4–2	6–1	2–4	10–10
Detroit	5–1	5–1	10–9	11–8	—	4–3	13–6	3–4	9–10	3–4	5–2	2–4	3–4	4–3	1–5	12–8
Houston	3–4	3–4	3–3	2–5	3–4	—	3–3	7–12	3–3	4–2	8–11	9–10	2–5	11–8	4–3	5–15
Kansas City	4–3	1–6	13–6	9–10	6–13	3–3	—	3–3	11–8	4–3	5–2	2–5	4–2	5–1	4–3	15–5
Los Angeles	2–4	5–2	5–1	5–2	4–3	12–7	3–3	—	7–0	2–4	10–9	7–12	5–2	14–5	5–2	12–8
Minnesota	3–4	2–4	10–9	8–11	10–9	3–3	8–11	0–7	—	3–4	1–6	5–2	2–4	2–5	4–2	9–11
New York	6–13	12–7	5–2	3–4	4–3	2–4	3–4	4–2	4–3	—	2–4	3–3	8–11	4–3	11–8	13–7
Oakland	4–2	4–3	3–4	4–2	2–5	11–8	2–5	9–10	6–1	4–2	—	9–10	4–2	9–10	4–3	13–7
Seattle	2–5	5–1	4–3	4–2	4–2	10–9	5–2	12–7	2–5	3–3	10–9	—	4–3	9–10	4–3	9–11
Tampa Bay	7–12	10–9	2–5	2–4	4–3	5–2	2–4	2–5	4–2	11–8	2–4	3–4	—	5–2	8–11	10–10
Texas	1–6	2–4	4–2	1–6	3–4	8–11	1–5	5–14	5–2	3–4	10–9	10–9	2–5	—	2–4	10–10
Toronto	8–11	12–7	2–5	4–2	5–1	3–4	3–4	2–5	2–4	8–11	3–4	3–4	11–8	4–2	—	13–7

== Game log ==
Legend
Yankees Win	Yankees Loss	Game postponed

Game Log (84–78)
April (15–11)

#	Date	Opponent	Score	Win	Loss	Save	Attendance	Record
1	April 1	@ Astros	2–6	Feldman (1–0)	Sabathia (0–1)		42,117	0–1
2	April 2	@ Astros	1–3	Cosart (1–0)	Kuroda (0–1)	Fields (1)	23,145	0–2
3	April 3	@ Astros	4–2	Nova (1–0)	Oberholtzer (0–1)	Robertson (1)	26,348	1–2
4	April 4	@ Blue Jays	7–3	Tanaka (1–0)	McGowan (0–1)		48,197	2–2
5	April 5	@ Blue Jays	0–4	Dickey (1–1)	Pineda (0–1)	Santos (2)	45,446	2–3
6	April 6	@ Blue Jays	6–4	Sabathia (1–1)	Hutchison (1–1)	Robertson (2)	34,067	3–3
7	April 7	Orioles	4–2	Kuroda (1–1)	Jiménez (0–2)	Kelley (1)	48,142	4–3
8	April 8	Orioles	5–14	Chen (1–1)	Nova (1–1)		35,864	4–4
9	April 9	Orioles	4–5	Matusz (1–0)	Kelley (0–1)	Hunter (3)	39,412	4–5
10	April 10	Red Sox	4–1	Pineda (1–1)	Buchholz (0–1)	Phelps (1)	42,821	5–5
11	April 11	Red Sox	2–4	Lester (1–2)	Sabathia (1–2)	Mujica (1)	44,121	5–6
12	April 12	Red Sox	7–4	Kuroda (2–1)	Lackey (2–1)	Kelley (2)	48,572	6–6
13	April 13	Red Sox	3–2	Nova (2–1)	Doubront (1–2)	Kelley (3)	46,081	7–6
--	April 15	Cubs	PPD, RAIN; rescheduled for April 16					
14	April 16	Cubs	3–0	Tanaka (2–0)	Hammel (2–1)	Kelley (4)	36,569	8–6
15	April 16	Cubs	2–0	Pineda (2–1)	Wood (0–2)	Warren (1)	40,073	9–6
16	April 17	@ Rays	10–2	Sabathia (2–2)	Price (2–1)		28,085	10–6
17	April 18	@ Rays	5–11	McGee (1–0)	Warren (0–1)		26,079	10–7
18	April 19	@ Rays	1–16	Archer (2–1)	Nova (2–2)		30,159	10–8
19	April 20	@ Rays	5–1 (12)	Claiborne (1–0)	Bell (0–1)		26,462	11–8
20	April 22	@ Red Sox	9–3	Tanaka (3–0)	Lester (2–3)		37,041	12–8
21	April 23	@ Red Sox	1–5	Lackey (3–2)	Pineda (2–2)		37,015	12–9
22	April 24	@ Red Sox	14–5	Sabathia (3–2)	Doubront (1–3)		37,356	13–9
23	April 25	Angels	1–13	Wilson (3–2)	Kuroda (2–2)		38,358	13–10
24	April 26	Angels	4–3	Betances (1–0)	Santiago (0–4)	Robertson (3)	40,908	14–10
25	April 27	Angels	3–2	Warren (1–1)	Kohn (1–1)	Robertson (4)	40,028	15–10
26	April 29	Mariners	3–6	Young (1–0)	Sabathia (3–3)		37,484	15–11
--	April 30	Mariners	PPD, RAIN; rescheduled for June 2					

May (14–14)

#	Date	Opponent	Score	Win	Loss	Save	Attendance	Record
27	May 1	Mariners	2–4	Elías (2–2)	Kuroda (2–3)	Rodney (6)	43,121	15–12
28	May 2	Rays	5–10 (14)	Bell (1–1)	Leroux (0–1)		33,580	15–13
29	May 3	Rays	9–3	Tanaka (4–0)	Lueke (0–2)		43,325	16–13
30	May 4	Rays	1–5	Bédard (1–1)	Sabathia (3–4)		41,122	16–14
31	May 5	@ Angels	1–4	Weaver (3–2)	Kelley (0–2)	Frieri (3)	39,701	16–15
32	May 6	@ Angels	4–3	Kelley (1–2)	Frieri (0–3)	Robertson (5)	40,106	17–15
33	May 7	@ Angels	9–2	Nuño (1–0)	Santiago (0–6)		44,083	18–15
34	May 9	@ Brewers	5–3	Tanaka (5–0)	Gallardo (2–2)	Robertson (6)	40,123	19–15
35	May 10	@ Brewers	4–5	Duke (3–0)	Aceves (0–1)	Rodríguez (15)	43,085	19–16
36	May 11	@ Brewers	5–6	Rodríguez (1–0)	Warren (1–2)		43,544	19–17
37	May 12	Mets	7–9	Mejía (4–0)	Thornton (0–1)	Farnsworth (3)	46,517	19–18
38	May 13	Mets	7–12	Matsuzaka (1–0)	Nuño (1–1)		45,958	19–19
39	May 14	@ Mets	4–0	Tanaka (6–0)	Montero (0–1)		35,577	20–19
40	May 15	@ Mets	1–0	Betances (2–0)	deGrom (0–1)	Robertson (7)	40,133	21–19
--	May 16	Pirates	PPD, RAIN; rescheduled for May 18					
41	May 17	Pirates	7–1	Phelps (1–0)	Vólquez (1–4)		47,353	22–19
42	May 18	Pirates	4–3	Kuroda (3–3)	Morton (0–6)	Robertson (8)	46,858	23–19
43	May 18	Pirates	3–5	Cole (4–3)	Aceves (0–2)	Melancon (6)	46,858	23–20
44	May 20	@ Cubs	1–6	Hammel (5–2)	Tanaka (6–1)		38,753	23–21
45	May 21	@ Cubs	4–2 (13)	Claiborne (2–0)	Veras (0–1)	Robertson (9)	34,808	24–21
46	May 22	@ White Sox	2–3	Sale (4–0)	Phelps (1–1)	Belisario (2)	21,677	24–22
47	May 23	@ White Sox	5–6	Webb (4–0)	Robertson (0–1)		27,091	24–23
48	May 24	@ White Sox	4–3 (10)	Betances (3–0)	Putnam (2–1)	Robertson (10)	33,413	25–23
49	May 25	@ White Sox	7–1	Tanaka (7–1)	Rienzo (4–1)		39,142	26–23
50	May 26	@ Cardinals	6–4 (12)	Aceves (1–2)	Choate (0–2)	Robertson (11)	47,311	27–23
51	May 27	@ Cardinals	0–6	Lynn (6–2)	Phelps (1–2)		45,202	27–24
52	May 28	@ Cardinals	7–4	Kuroda (4–3)	Miller (6–4)		45,267	28–24
53	May 30	Twins	1–6	Nolasco (3–5)	Nuño (1–2)		42,245	28–25
54	May 31	Twins	3–1	Tanaka (8–1)	Duensing (1–2)	Robertson (12)	44,346	29–25

June (12–15)

#	Date	Opponent	Score	Win	Loss	Save	Attendance	Record
55	June 1	Twins	2–7	Hughes (6–1)	Robertson (0–2)		42,449	29–26
56	June 2	Mariners	2–10	Hernández (8–1)	Phelps (1–3)		41,539	29–27
57	June 3	Athletics	2–5 (10)	Otero (5–1)	Warren (1–3)	Doolittle (6)	41,667	29–28
58	June 4	Athletics	4–7	Chavez (5–3)	Ramírez (0–1)	Doolittle (7)	37,734	29–29
59	June 5	Athletics	2–1	Tanaka (9–1)	Pomeranz (5–3)	Robertson (13)	44,346	30–29
60	June 6	@ Royals	4–2	Whitley (1–0)	Guthrie (2–6)	Robertson (14)	23,418	31–29
61	June 7	@ Royals	4–8	Crow (3–1)	Phelps (1–4)		26,991	31–30
62	June 8	@ Royals	1–2	Shields (7–3)	Kuroda (4–4)	Holland (18)	24,614	31–31
--	June 9	@ Royals	PPD, RAIN; rescheduled for August 25					
63	June 10	@ Mariners	3–2	Betances (4–0)	Iwakuma (4–3)	Robertson (15)	28,405	32–31
64	June 11	@ Mariners	4–2	Tanaka (10–1)	Young (5–4)		28,434	33–31
65	June 12	@ Mariners	6–3	Whitley (2–0)	Elías (5–5)	Robertson (16)	40,596	34–31
66	June 13	@ Athletics	7–0	Phelps (2–4)	Gray (6–3)		36,067	35–31
67	June 14	@ Athletics	1–5	Kazmir (8–2)	Kuroda (4–5)		36,067	35–32
68	June 15	@ Athletics	5–10	Chavez (6–4)	Nuño (1–3)		36,067	35–33
69	June 17	Blue Jays	3–1	Tanaka (11–1)	Stroman (3–2)	Robertson (17)	41,834	36–33
70	June 18	Blue Jays	7–3	Whitley (3–0)	Buehrle (10–4)		41,342	37–33
71	June 19	Blue Jays	6–4	Phelps (3–4)	Hutchison (5–5)	Warren (2)	40,169	38–33
72	June 20	Orioles	5–3	Huff (2–0)	Britton (3–1)		46,197	39–33
73	June 21	Orioles	1–6	Norris (7–5)	Nuño (1–4)		47,165	39–34
74	June 22	Orioles	0–8	Tillman (6–4)	Tanaka (11–2)		47,493	39–35
75	June 23	@ Blue Jays	3–8	Stroman (4–2)	Whitley (3–1)		31,554	39–36
76	June 24	@ Blue Jays	6–7	Janssen (2–0)	Warren (1–4)		34,206	39–37
77	June 25	@ Blue Jays	5–3	Kuroda (5–5)	Hutchison (5–6)	Robertson (18)	34,710	40–37
78	June 27	Red Sox	6–0	Nuño (2–4)	Workman (1–1)		48,522	41–37
79	June 28	Red Sox	1–2	Lester (9–7)	Tanaka (11–3)	Uehara (17)	48,433	41–38
80	June 29	Red Sox	5–8	Lackey (9–5)	Whitley (3–2)	Uehara (18)	48,124	41–39
81	June 30	Rays	3–4 (12)	Boxberger (1–1)	Ramírez (0–2)		36,052	41–40

July (14–12)

#	Date	Opponent	Score	Win	Loss	Save	Attendance	Record
82	July 1	Rays	1–2	Price (7–7)	Kuroda (5–6)	Balfour (11)	35,866	41–41
83	July 2	Rays	3–6	Odorizzi (4–7)	Nuño (2–5)	Boxberger (1)	42,343	41–42
84	July 3	@ Twins	7–4	Tanaka (12–3)	Hughes (8–5)	Robertson (19)	34,714	42–42
85	July 4	@ Twins	6–5	Huff (3–0)	Gibson (7–7)	Robertson (20)	36,952	43–42
86	July 5	@ Twins	1–2 (11)	Duensing (2–2)	Thornton (0–2)		36,514	43–43
87	July 6	@ Twins	9–7	Kuroda (6–6)	Nolasco (5–7)	Robertson (21)	31,171	44–43
88	July 7	@ Indians	5–3	Greene (1–0)	Masterson (4–6)	Betances (1)	21,558	45–43
89	July 8	@ Indians	3–5	Bauer (3–4)	Tanaka (12–4)	Allen (22)	23,384	45–44
90	July 9	@ Indians	5–4 (14)	Whitley (4–2)	Pestano (0–1)	Robertson (22)	21,727	46–44
91	July 10	@ Indians	3–9	Carrasco (2–3)	Thornton (0–3)		28,334	46–45
92	July 11	@ Orioles	2–3 (10)	McFarland (3–2)	Warren (1–5)		45,389	46–46
93	July 12	@ Orioles	3–0	Greene (2–0)	Tillman (7–5)	Robertson (23)	46,667	47–46
94	July 13	@ Orioles	1–3 (5)	Gausman (4–2)	Whitley (4–3)		34,483	47–47
All-Star Break: AL defeats NL 5–3
95	July 18	Reds	4–3	Phelps (4–4)	Leake (7–8)	Robertson (24)	47,372	48–47
96	July 19	Reds	7–1	McCarthy (4–10)	Simón (12–4)		47,606	49–47
97	July 20	Reds	3–2	Robertson (1–2)	Chapman (0–3)		43,115	50–47
98	July 21	Rangers	2–4	Mikolas (1–2)	Greene (2–1)	Soria (17)	45,278	50–48
99	July 22	Rangers	2–1 (14)	Francis (1–2)	Tepesch (3–6)		37,669	51–48
100	July 23	Rangers	2–1 (5)	Phelps (5–4)	Darvish (9–6)		37,585	52–48
101	July 24	Rangers	4–2	McCarthy (5–10)	Lewis (6–8)	Robertson (25)	45,105	53–48
102	July 25	Blue Jays	6–4	Kuroda (7–6)	Buerhrle (10–7)	Robertson (26)	44,237	54–48
103	July 26	Blue Jays	4–6	Hutchison (7–9)	Kelley (1–3)		46,166	54–49
104	July 27	Blue Jays	4–5	Sanchez (1–0)	Robertson (1–3)	Janssen (16)	45,063	54–50
105	July 28	@ Rangers	2–4	Darvish (10–6)	Phelps (5–5)	Feliz (2)	44,508	54–51
106	July 29	@ Rangers	12–11	McCarthy (6–10)	Martinez (1–7)	Robertson (27)	41,934	55–51
107	July 30	@ Rangers	2–3	Lewis (7–8)	Kuroda (7–7)	Feliz (3)	46,599	55–52

August (15–13)

#	Date	Opponent	Score	Win	Loss	Save	Attendance	Record
108	August 1	@ Red Sox	3–4	Ranaudo (1–0)	Capuano (1–2)	Uehara (22)	37,782	55–53
109	August 2	@ Red Sox	6–4	Kelley (2–3)	Webster (1–1)	Robertson (28)	37,302	56–53
110	August 3	@ Red Sox	8–7	Rogers (1–0)	Breslow (2–3)	Robertson (29)	38,035	57–53
111	August 4	Tigers	2–1	McCarthy (7–10)	Scherzer (13–4)	Robertson (30)	41,603	58–53
112	August 5	Tigers	3–4 (12)	Soria (2–4)	Daley (0–1)	Nathan (23)	40,078	58–54
113	August 6	Tigers	5–1	Warren (2–5)	Verlander (10–10)		40,067	59–54
114	August 7	Tigers	1–0	Greene (3–1)	Porcello (13–6)	Robertson (31)	47,013	60–54
115	August 8	Indians	10–6	Rogers (2–0)	Bauer (4–7)		43,972	61–54
116	August 9	Indians	0–3	Kluber (13–6)	McCarthy (7–11)	Allen (15)	47,376	61–55
117	August 10	Indians	1–4	Carrasco (4–4)	Kuroda (7–8)		46,152	61–56
118	August 11	@ Orioles	3–11	Norris (10–7)	Capuano (1–3)		34,018	61–57
--	August 12	@ Orioles	PPD, RAIN; rescheduled for September 12					
119	August 13	@ Orioles	3–5	O'Day (5–1)	Kelley (2–4)	Britton (25)	37,587	61–58
120	August 15	@ Rays	0–5	Cobb (8–6)	McCarthy (7–12)		26,535	61–59
121	August 16	@ Rays	3–2	Betances (5–0)	McGee (3–1)	Robertson (32)	31,042	62–59
122	August 17	@ Rays	4–2	Kuroda (8–8)	Hellickson (1–2)	Robertson (33)	28,812	63–59
123	August 19	Astros	4–7	Fields (3–6)	Robertson (1–4)	Qualls (14)	40,015	63–60
124	August 20	Astros	2–5	Feldman (7–9)	Huff (3–1)	Veras (1)	42,102	63–61
125	August 21	Astros	3–0	McCarthy (8–12)	Keuchel (10–9)		41,767	64–61
126	August 22	White Sox	4–3	Robertson (2–4)	Webb (5–4)		43,811	65–61
127	August 23	White Sox	5–3	Kuroda (9–8)	Carroll (5–8)	Robertson (34)	47,594	66–61
128	August 24	White Sox	7–4 (10)	Huff (4–1)	Petricka (0–3)		43,366	67–61
129	August 25	@ Royals	8–1	Pineda (3–2)	Shields (12–7)		31,756	68–61
130	August 26	@ Tigers	2–5	Porcello (15–8)	McCarthy (8–13)	Nathan (28)	40,488	68–62
131	August 27	@ Tigers	8–4	Greene (4–1)	Price (12–10)		40,876	69–62
132	August 28	@ Tigers	2–3	Coke (2–2)	Kelley (2–5)		42,647	69–63
133	August 29	@ Blue Jays	6–3	Capuano (2–3)	Buehrle (11–9)	Robertson (35)	43,318	70–63
134	August 30	@ Blue Jays	0–2	Hutchison (9–11)	Pineda (3–3)	Sanchez (1)	45,863	70–64
135	August 31	@ Blue Jays	3–4	Happ (9–8)	McCarthy (8–14)	Janssen (20)	45,678	70–65

September (14–13)

#	Date	Opponent	Score	Win	Loss	Save	Attendance	Record
136	September 2	Red Sox	4–9	Kelly (3–3)	Greene (4–2)		40,334	70–66
137	September 3	Red Sox	5–1	Kuroda (10–8)	Ranaudo (3–1)		40,007	71–66
138	September 4	Red Sox	5–4	Warren (3–5)	Uehara (6–5)		44,708	72–66
139	September 5	Royals	0–1	Shields (13–7)	Pineda (3–4)	Davis (1)	36,284	72–67
140	September 6	Royals	6–2	McCarthy (9–14)	Hendriks (1–1)		45,262	73–67
141	September 7	Royals	0–2	Ventura (12–9)	Greene (4–3)	Davis (2)	48,110	73–68
142	September 9	Rays	3–4	Archer (9–8)	Kuroda (10–9)	McGee (17)	31,188	73–69
143	September 10	Rays	8–5	Claiborne (3–0)	Odorizzi (10–12)		31,591	74–69
144	September 11	Rays	5–4	Kelley (3–5)	McGee (4–2)		32,627	75–69
145	September 12	@ Orioles	1–2 (11)	Brach (7–1)	Warren (3–6)		31,871	75–70
146	September 12	@ Orioles	0–5	Norris (13–8)	Mitchell (0–1)		43,707	75–71
147	September 13	@ Orioles	3–2	Greene (5–3)	González (9–8)	Robertson (36)	44,231	76–71
148	September 14	@ Orioles	2–3	O'Day (5–1)	Robertson (2–5)		43,947	76–72
149	September 15	@ Rays	0–1	Peralta (3–4)	Kelley (3–6)		16,058	76–73
150	September 16	@ Rays	1–6	Odorizzi (11–12)	Pineda (3–5)		21,387	76–74
151	September 17	@ Rays	3–2	McCarthy (10–14)	Cobb (9–8)	Robertson (37)	26,332	77–74
152	September 18	Blue Jays	3–2	Robertson (3–5)	Sanchez (2–2)		34,279	78–74
153	September 19	Blue Jays	5–3	Kuroda (11–9)	Buehrle (12–10)	Warren (3)	40,059	79–74
154	September 20	Blue Jays	3–6	Stroman (11–6)	Capuano (2–4)	Janssen (24)	47,292	79–75
155	September 21	Blue Jays	5–2	Tanaka (13–4)	Hutchison (10–13)	Robertson (38)	48,144	80–75
156	September 22	Orioles	5–0	Pineda (4–5)	Chen (16–5)		35,614	81–75
157	September 23	Orioles	4–5	Jiménez (6–9)	McCarthy (10–15)	Britton (36)	43,201	81–76
158	September 24	Orioles	5–9	Norris (15–8)	Greene (5–4)		46,056	81–77
159	September 25	Orioles	6–5	Robertson (4–5)	Meek (0–4)		48,613	82–77
160	September 26	@ Red Sox	3–2	Capuano (3–4)	Wright (0–1)	Robertson (39)	37,605	83–77
161	September 27	@ Red Sox	4–10	Kelly (6–4)	Tanaka (13–5)		37,147	83–78
162	September 28	@ Red Sox	9–5	Pineda (5–5)	Buchholz (8–11)		36,879	84–78

== Farm system ==
Level	Team	League	Manager
AAA	Scranton/Wilkes-Barre RailRiders	International League	Dave Miley
AA	Trenton Thunder	Eastern League	Tony Franklin
A	Tampa Yankees	Florida State League	Al Pedrique
A	Charleston RiverDogs	South Atlantic League	Luis Dorante
A-Short Season	Staten Island Yankees	New York–Penn League	Mario Garza
Rookie	GCL Yankees 1	Gulf Coast League	Travis Chapman
Rookie	GCL Yankees 2	Gulf Coast League	Pat Osborn
