= Sexy time =

Sexy time may refer to:

- Sex in the "unfluent English" of the Borat character
- nickname of Yangervis Solarte (born 1987), Venezuelan former professional baseball player
