= Zelous Wheeler =

American baseball player (born 1987)

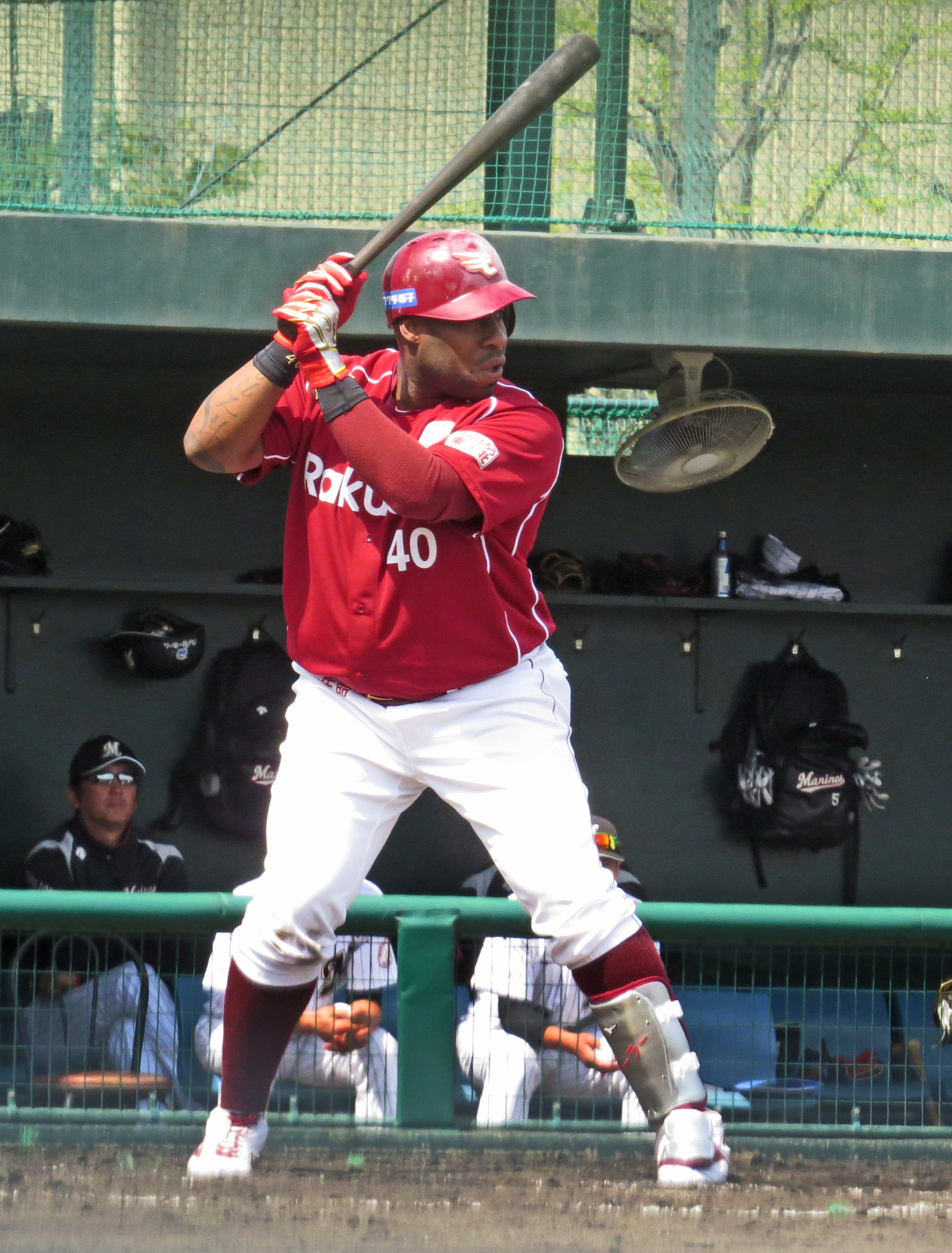
- Wheeler with the Tohoku Rakuten Golden Eagles in 2015

Yomiuri Giants – No. 110
- Third baseman / Right fielder / Coach
- Born: January 16, 1987 (age 39); Childersburg, Alabama, U.S.
- Batted: Right Threw: Right

Professional debut
- MLB: July 3, 2014, for the New York Yankees
- NPB: March 27, 2015, for the Tohoku Rakuten Golden Eagles

Last appearance
- MLB: September 26, 2014, for the New York Yankees
- NPB: October 28, 2022, for the Yomiuri Giants

MLB statistics
- Batting average: .193
- Home runs: 2
- Runs batted in: 5

NPB statistics
- Batting average: .263
- Home runs: 135
- Runs batted in: 442
- Stats at Baseball Reference

Teams
- As player: New York Yankees (2014); Tohoku Rakuten Golden Eagles (2015–2020); Yomiuri Giants (2020–2022); As coach: Yomiuri Giants (2023–present)

Career highlights and awards
- Best Nine Award (2017); NPB All-Star (2021)

Zelous Lamar Wheeler (born January 16, 1987) is an American former professional baseball third baseman and right fielder who currently serves as a co-hitting coach for the Yomiuri Giants of Nippon Professional Baseball (NPB). He played in NPB for the Tohoku Rakuten Golden Eagles and Giants, and in Major League Baseball (MLB) for the New York Yankees.

Wheeler played baseball at Childersburg High School and Wallace State Community College. The Milwaukee Brewers selected him in the 19th round of the 2007 Major League Baseball draft. He was added to the Brewers' 40-man roster after the 2011 season, but was waived before the 2012 season began. Claimed by the Baltimore Orioles, he played in their farm system in 2012 and 2013, before signing as a free agent with the New York Yankees before the 2014 season. After starting the season in the minor leagues, Wheeler made his MLB debut on July 3, 2014.

== Playing career ==
=== Amateur career ===
From Sylacauga, Alabama, Wheeler attended Childersburg High School, where he played baseball and American football. A linebacker for the football team, Wheeler was named among the best players of the state of Alabama. He received offers to play college football from several Division II schools, including Jacksonville State University, Miles College, and Livingston College. He chose instead to enroll at Wallace State Community College in Hanceville, Alabama, where he played college baseball. His teammates included Derek Holland, Craig Kimbrel, and Jake Elmore.

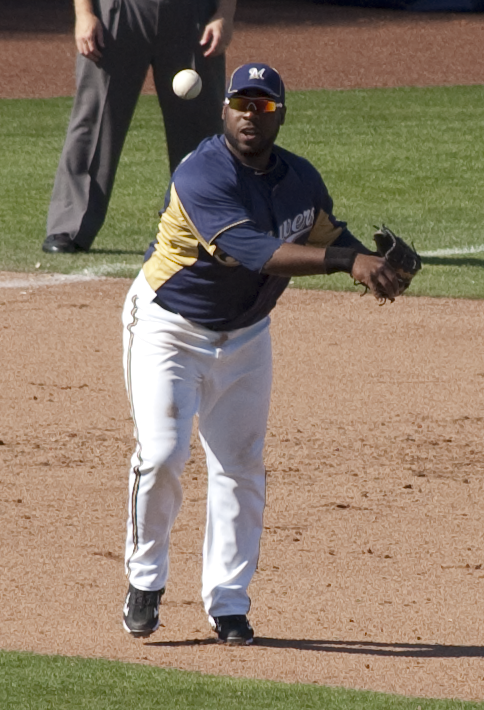
Wheeler with the Milwaukee Brewers in 2011

In 2006, Wallace State won the Alabama Community College Conference championship, and finished third in the National Junior College Athletic Association World Series. In 2007, Wheeler shifted from third base to shortstop for the Lions.

=== Professional career ===
==== Milwaukee Brewers ====
The Milwaukee Brewers selected Wheeler in the 19th round of the 2007 Major League Baseball draft. He signed and played for the Helena Brewers of the Rookie-level Pioneer League. He played for the West Virginia Power of the Class A South Atlantic League in 2008, and the Brevard County Manatees of the Class A-Advanced Florida State League in 2009, being named an All-Star in both seasons. In 2010, Wheeler played shortstop for the Huntsville Stars of the Class AA Southern League. However, he committed 32 errors.

In 2011, Wheeler began the season with the Nashville Sounds of the Class AAA Pacific Coast League, but missed two months due to an injured posterior cruciate ligament. He played for both Nashville and Huntsville in 2011. After the 2011 season, Wheeler was assigned to the Arizona Fall League. He began to catch bullpen sessions. The Brewers also added him to their 40-man roster to protect him from being selected in the Rule 5 draft. However, the Brewers signed Aramis Ramírez to a three-year contract to become the Brewers' third basemen, blocking Wheeler.

In spring training in 2012, Wheeler competed with Taylor Green and Brooks Conrad for a reserve role as an infielder. He began to work out at catcher to increase his versatility.

==== Baltimore Orioles ====
At the end of spring training, the Brewers waived Wheeler, and he was claimed by the Baltimore Orioles, who assigned him to the Norfolk Tides of the Class AAA International League. While playing for the Bowie Baysox of the Class AA Eastern League in May 2012, the Orioles designated Wheeler for assignment, removing him from their 40-man roster, as they added Dana Eveland. He cleared waivers, and was assigned to Bowie. In the offseason, Wheeler played for the Algodoneros de Guasave in the Mexican Pacific League (MPL). Wheeler played for Norfolk in 2013.

Playing for Guasave in the 2013–14 offseason, Wheeler was named player of the week on November 11. He finished the MPL season tied for second in home runs and third in runs batted in (RBIs).

==== New York Yankees ====
Wheeler signed a minor league contract with the New York Yankees, receiving an invitation to spring training in 2014. In camp, Wheeler competed with Eduardo Núñez, Yangervis Solarte, Dean Anna, and Scott Sizemore for a reserve infielder role with the Yankees. The Yankees promoted Anna, and assigned Wheeler to minor league camp. The Yankees assigned Wheeler to the Scranton/Wilkes-Barre RailRiders of the International League to start the 2014 season. Wheeler suffered a back injury on April 10, and went on the disabled list (DL). After missing 18 days, he returned to bat .299 with seven home runs in 66 games.

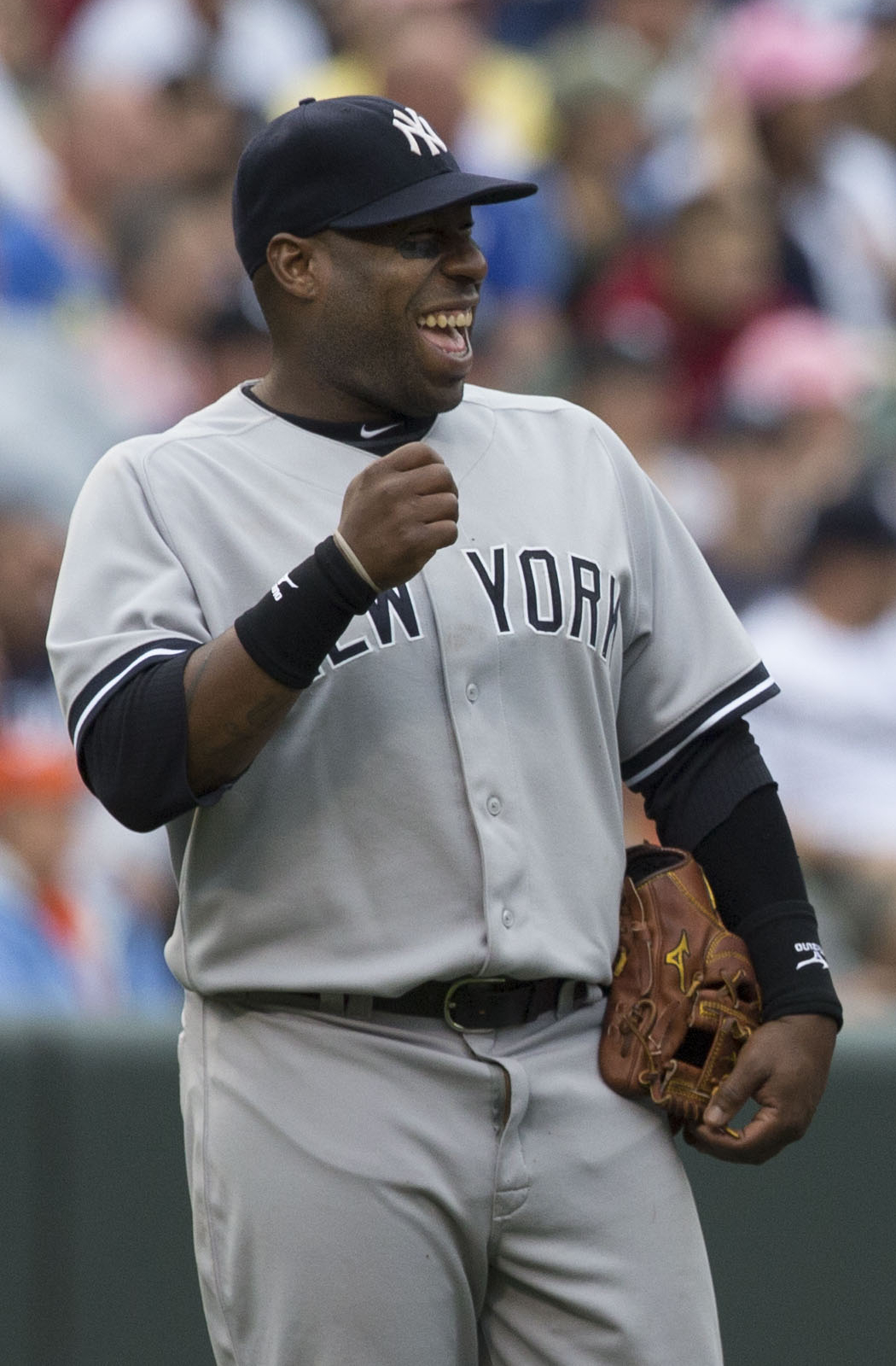
Wheeler with the New York Yankees in 2014

On July 2, 2014, the Yankees promoted Wheeler to the major leagues. Making his major league debut the next day, Wheeler got his first major league hit, a home run, in his second at bat. Wheeler batted 8-for-30 (.267) with two home runs and three RBIs in 16 games for the Yankees, before he was optioned to Scranton/Wilkes-Barre on August 1 following the Yankees acquisitions of Martín Prado and Stephen Drew. The Yankees recalled Wheeler on August 21, when they placed Carlos Beltrán on the DL with an elbow injury.

==== Tohoku Rakuten Golden Eagles ====
On November 20, 2014, the Yankees sold Wheeler to the Tohoku Rakuten Golden Eagles of Nippon Professional Baseball's Pacific League. In 2015, Wheeler slashed .255/.339/.453 with 14 home runs and 50 RBI for the team. The next year, Wheeler improved his performance, slashing .265/.351/.478 with a staggering 27 home runs and 88 RBI. In 2017, Wheeler batted .271/.343/.493 with 31 home runs and 82 RBI. Wheeler signed a two-year contract extension worth ¥400 million (approximately $3.5 million) in October 2017, the deal includes incentives and a club option for the 2020 season. In 2018, Wheeler hit .269/.337/.432 with 15 home runs and 58 RBI in 106 games. In 117 games for the Eagles in 2019, Wheeler batted .243/.320/.418 with 19 home runs and 67 RBI. On December 3, 2019, Wheeler signed a 1-year extension to remain with the Eagles.

==== Yomiuri Giants ====
On June 25, 2020, Wheeler was traded to the Yomiuri Giants for pitcher Shun Ikeda. In 98 games for Yomiuri, Wheeler batted .247/.309/.418 with 12 home runs and 36 RBI.

On December 26, 2021, Wheeler re-signed with the Giants for the 2022 season. On April 18, 2022, Wheeler was sent down to the Giants' farm team after hitting .160 in 13 games.

== Coaching career ==
On December 20, 2022, Wheeler took a front office advisory role with the Yomiuri Giants.

On November 27, 2025, the Giants hired Lee Seung-yuop to serve as a co-hitting coach alongside Wheeler, who also received the title of co-hitting coach.

== Personal life ==
Wheeler has a younger brother, Brian, who also plays baseball. His father, Sam, owns a landscaping business and supervises at an aquarium. Two of Wheeler's uncles, Dameian Jeffries and Marcus Knight, played in the National Football League.

On July 25, 2015, Wheeler and his wife had a son.
