= Preston Claiborne =

American baseball player (born 1988)

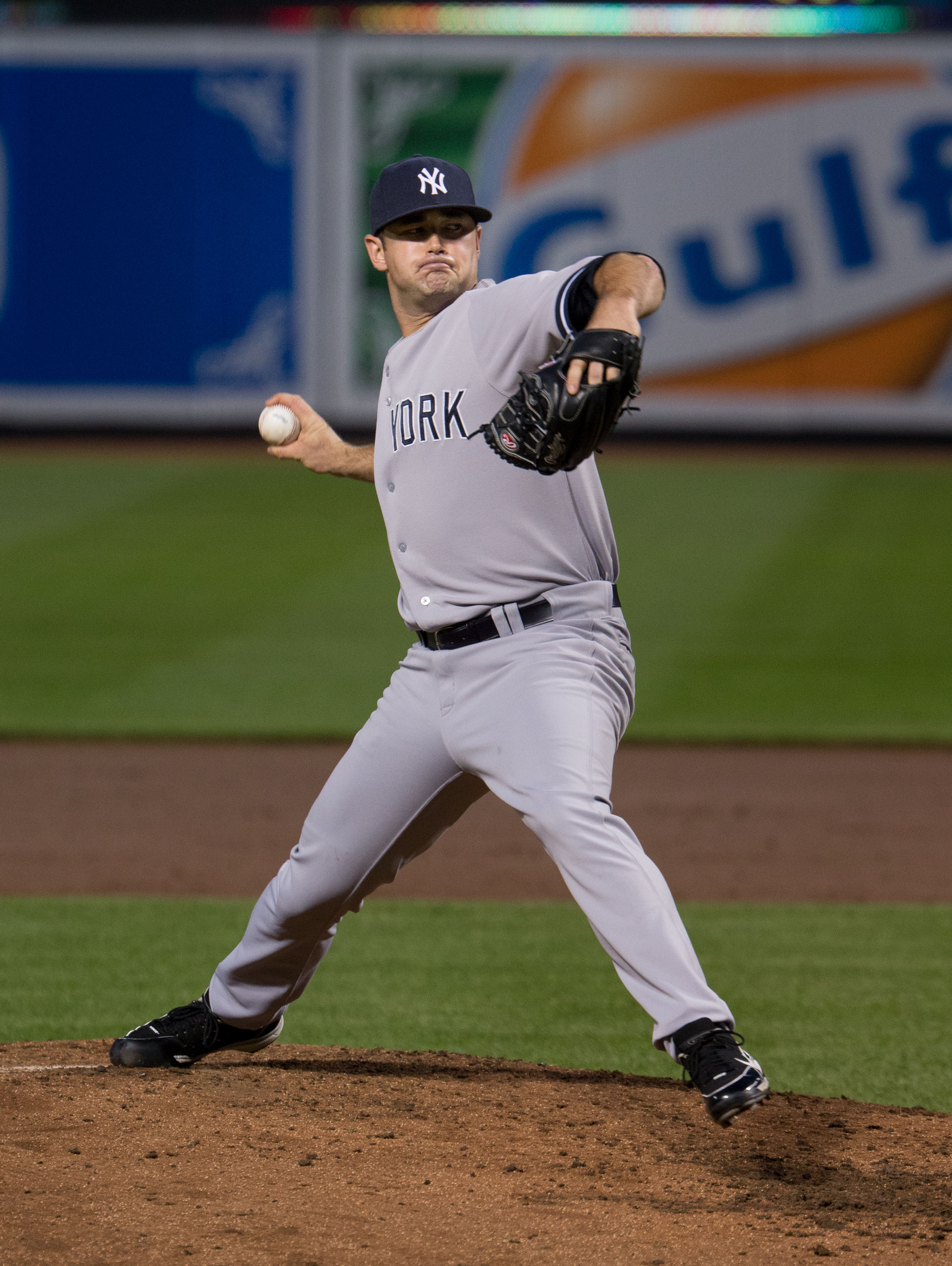
- Claiborne with the New York Yankees

New York Yankees – No. 79
- Pitcher / Coach
- Born: January 21, 1988 (age 38); Dallas, Texas, U.S.
- Batted: Right Threw: Right

MLB debut
- May 5, 2013, for the New York Yankees

Last MLB appearance
- June 26, 2017, for the Texas Rangers

MLB statistics
- Win–loss record: 3–2
- Earned run average: 4.05
- Strikeouts: 60
- Stats at Baseball Reference

Teams
- As player: New York Yankees (2013–2014); Texas Rangers (2017); As coach: New York Yankees (2025–present)

Preston Michael Claiborne (born January 21, 1988) is an American former professional baseball pitcher who serves as the bullpen coach for the New York Yankees of Major League Baseball (MLB). He played in MLB for the Yankees and Texas Rangers. He attended Tulane University, where he played college baseball for the Tulane Green Wave.

== Playing career ==
=== Amateur ===
Claiborne attended Newman Smith High School in Carrollton, Texas, where he played for the school's baseball team. Selected in the 23rd round of the 2006 Major League Baseball draft by the Pittsburgh Pirates, Claiborne did not sign, opting to attend Tulane University to play for the Tulane Green Wave baseball team. At Tulane, he was used as a relief pitcher, appearing in a total of 84 games from 2007 through 2010. In 2007 and 2008, he played collegiate summer baseball with the Falmouth Commodores of the Cape Cod Baseball League.

=== New York Yankees ===
The New York Yankees selected Claiborne in the 17th round of the 2010 Major League Baseball draft. He signed and reported to the Staten Island Yankees of the Low–A New York–Penn League. He was promoted to the Tampa Yankees of the High–A Florida State League that year, in time to pitch for Tampa in the league's playoffs. He returned to Tampa in 2011.

Claiborne started the 2012 season with the Trenton Thunder of the Double–A Eastern League, and made 20 appearances for the Scranton/Wilkes-Barre Yankees of the Triple–A International League that year.

Claiborne began the 2013 season with the Scranton/Wilkes-Barre RailRiders, and was called up to the majors for the first time on May 3, 2013, when the Yankees placed Joba Chamberlain on the disabled list. He made his major league debut on May 5, against the Oakland Athletics. During his debut, he pitched two scoreless innings without allowing a baserunner. Claiborne was optioned down to Scranton/Wilkes-Barre on August 16. He was then recalled to be the 26th player for a doubleheader against the Toronto Blue Jays on August 20 but was optioned back to Scranton/Wilkes-Barre right after the second game. However, he was brought back up on August 22 when infielder Jayson Nix was placed on the disabled list. Claiborne was optioned back to Triple-A on August 26 when the Yankees activated Derek Jeter from the disabled list. He was then brought back up to the Yankees on September 2 after the rosters expanded the previous day. Claiborne was designated for assignment by the Yankees on December 19, 2014.

=== Miami Marlins ===
Claiborne was claimed off waivers by the Miami Marlins on December 23, 2014. He missed the entire 2015 season with a shoulder injury. On March 17, 2016, Claiborne was released by the Marlins.

=== San Francisco Giants ===
On May 16, 2016, Claiborne signed a minor league contract with the San Francisco Giants organization. He made 34 appearances out of the bullpen for the Double–A Richmond Flying Squirrels, posting a 2.38 ERA with 49 strikeouts and 3 saves. Claiborne elected free agency following the season on November 7.

=== Texas Rangers ===
On February 24, 2017, Claiborne signed a minor league deal with the Texas Rangers. He was promoted to the major league roster on June 22. Claiborne was designated for assignment on July 2.

=== Cleveland Indians ===
On January 26, 2018, Claiborne signed a minor league contract with the Cleveland Indians. In 10 appearances split between the rookie–level Arizona League Indians, Double–A Akron RubberDucks, and Triple–A Columbus Clippers, he accumulated a 9.31 ERA with 10 strikeouts across 9 2/3 innings pitched. Claiborne elected free agency following the season on November 2.

== Post–playing career ==
Claiborne was named pitching coach of the Hudson Valley Renegades High-A affiliate for the New York Yankees in 2023. He was named pitching coach of the Tampa Tarpons, the Yankees' Single-A affiliate, for the 2024 season.

On January 21, 2025, the Yankees added Claiborne to their major league coaching staff under the role of assistant pitching coach.

== Personal life ==
The first time Claiborne attended a baseball game, which featured the visiting Yankees playing the Texas Rangers, his father encouraged him to play with the "class and respect" of a Yankee. His father died of a stroke during Claiborne's sophomore year at Tulane. He contributed to a website, TheCupCheck.com, which is run by minor league baseball players to give other minor leaguers tips on how to handle life in professional baseball. The Wall Street Journal called Claiborne "one of the site's most prolific contributors."
