= Yangervis Solarte =

Venezuelan baseball player (born 1987)

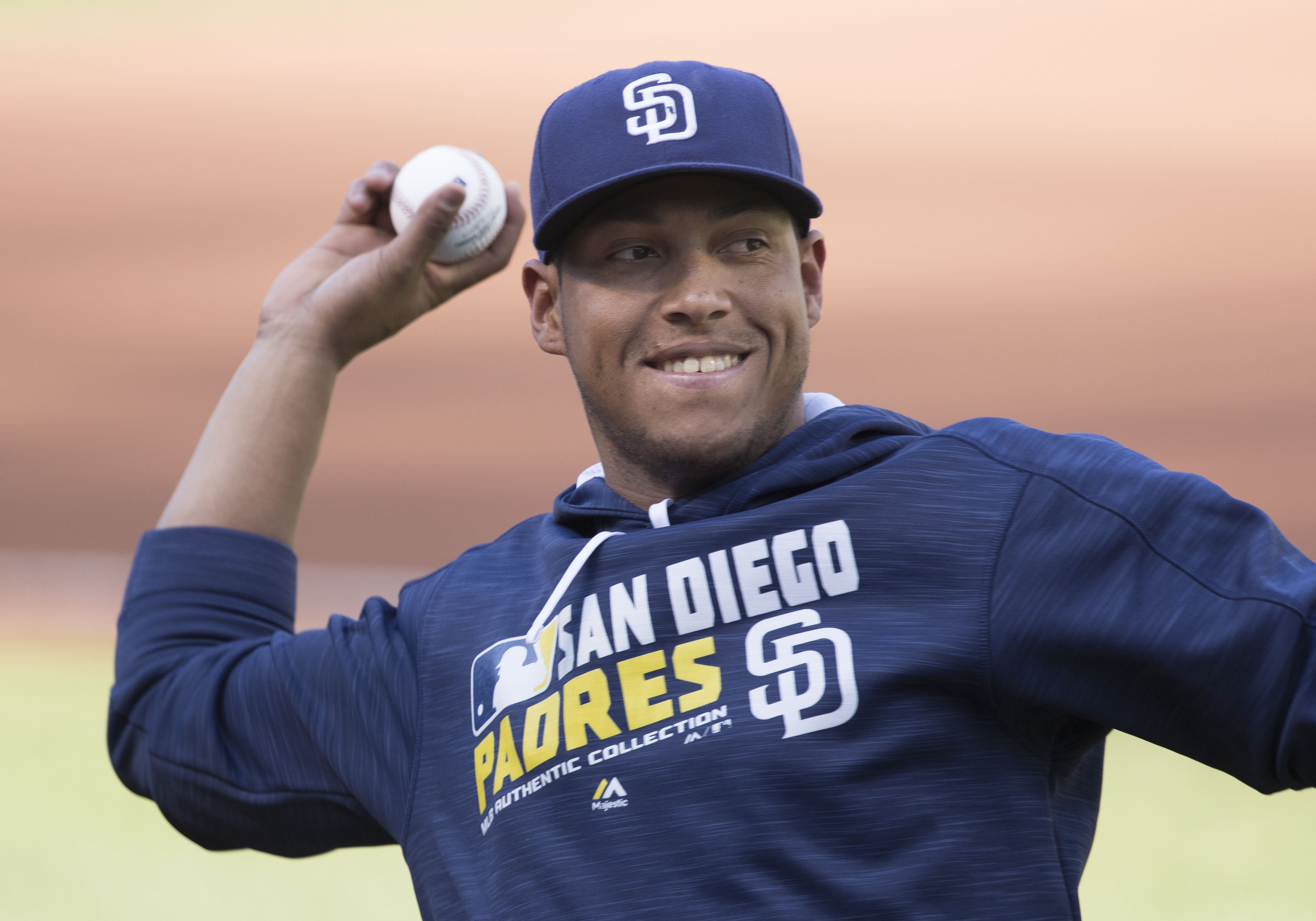
- Solarte with the San Diego Padres in 2016

Conspiradores de Querétaro – No. 26
- Infielder
- Born: July 3, 1987 (age 39); Valencia, Carabobo, Venezuela
- Bats: Switch Throws: Right

Professional debut
- MLB: April 2, 2014, for the New York Yankees
- NPB: July 26, 2019, for the Hanshin Tigers

MLB statistics (through 2019 season)
- Batting average: .258
- Home runs: 75
- Runs batted in: 307

NPB statistics (through 2019 season)
- Batting average: .188
- Home runs: 4
- Runs batted in: 9
- Stats at Baseball Reference

Teams
- New York Yankees (2014); San Diego Padres (2014–2017); Toronto Blue Jays (2018); San Francisco Giants (2019); Hanshin Tigers (2019)

Yangervis Alfredo Solarte (born July 3, 1987) is a Venezuelan professional baseball infielder for the Conspiradores de Querétaro of the Mexican League. He made his MLB debut for the New York Yankees on April 2, 2014, and has also played for the San Diego Padres, Toronto Blue Jays, and San Francisco Giants. He has additionally played in Nippon Professional Baseball (NPB) for the Hanshin Tigers.

== Professional career ==
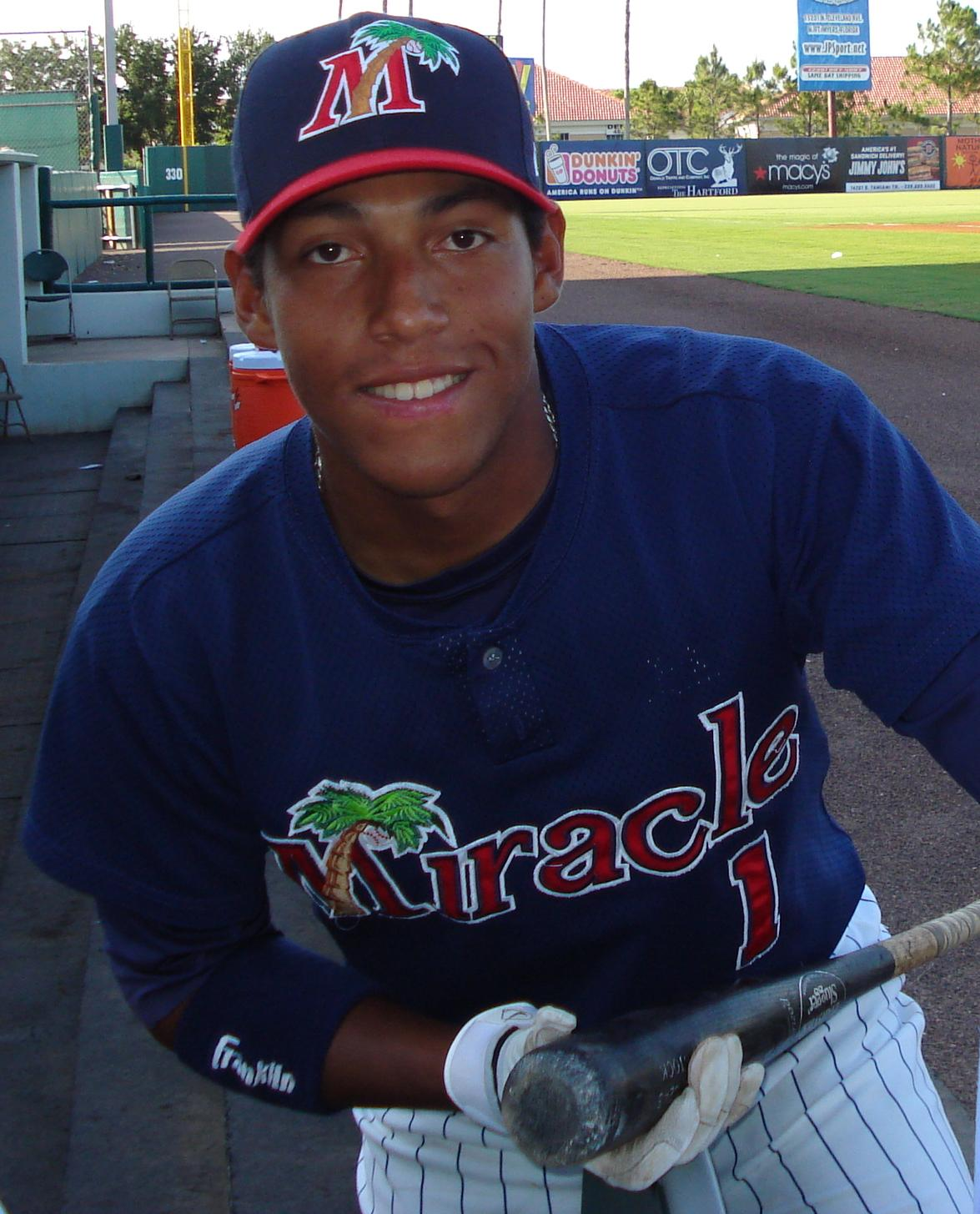
Solarte with the Fort Myers Miracle in 2008

=== Minnesota Twins ===
Solarte signed with the Minnesota Twins in 2005, a few weeks before his 18th birthday. Working his way through the lower levels of the Twins organization, he reached Double-A in 2009, but underwent surgery on his right shoulder and only played 16 games that season. In 2010, he split time between the High-A Florida State League and the Double-A Eastern League. Playing the full season with New Britain of the Eastern League in 2011, he recorded a batting line of .329/.367/.466 in 121 games, most of them at second base.

=== Texas Rangers ===
In December 2011, Solarte signed a minor league deal with the Texas Rangers, which included an invitation to spring training. Solarte played both the 2012 and 2013 seasons with the Rangers' Triple-A affiliate, the Round Rock Express, where he made starts at second, third, shortstop, left field, and first base. Between the two seasons, he had a .282/.331/.404 batting line and 23 home runs in 263 games.

=== New York Yankees ===
Following the 2013 season, Solarte became a free agent, and his agent, Chris Leible, helped convince him that his best opportunity to play regularly in the majors would be as a utility infielder. Three scouts had endorsed him, including Jay Darnell, David Keith and Don Wakamatsu. Solarte signed a minor league deal with the New York Yankees in January 2014, who had passed on resigning free agent second baseman Robinson Canó. In spring training in 2014, Solarte competed with Eduardo Núñez, Zelous Wheeler, Dean Anna, and Scott Sizemore for a reserve infielder role with the Yankees, making the team out of spring training.

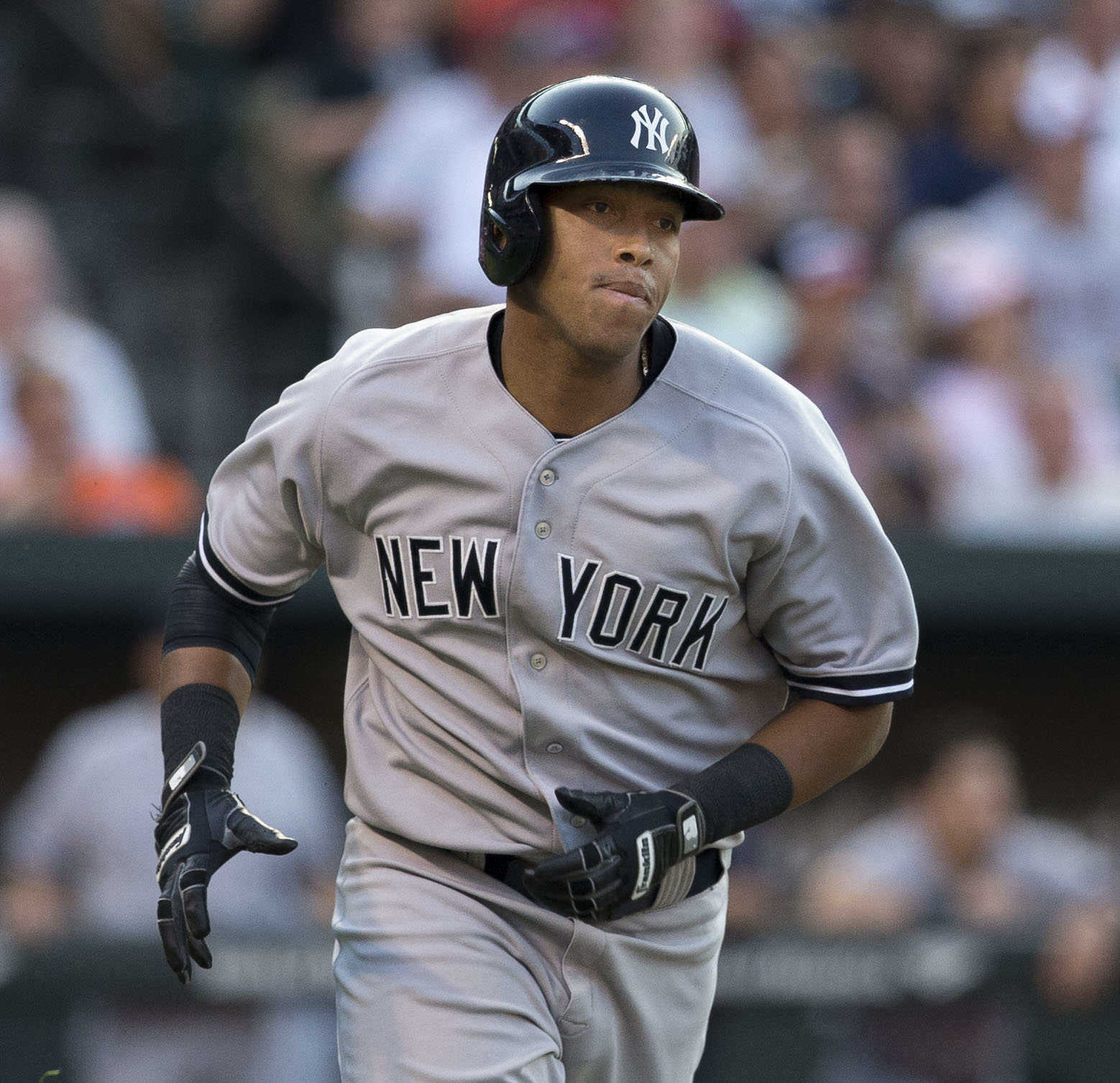
Solarte playing for the New York Yankees in 2014

Solarte's time with the Yankees started with collecting nine hits in his first 20 at bats, including four doubles and six RBI. On April 8, 2014, Solarte hit two doubles, and became the first player in the Modern Era (since 1900) to hit six doubles in his first seven games in the Major Leagues. On April 17, 2014, Solarte started a 5-4-3 triple play against the Tampa Bay Rays at Tropicana Field. He hit his first big league home run later that same game off of Rays pitcher Grant Balfour. He then hit his second home run, a three-run shot, against the Milwaukee Brewers, which eventually drove them to win the game. Early the next month, Solarte at one point held the highest batting average in the American League.

On July 3, 2014, Solarte was optioned back down to Triple–A while INF Zelous Wheeler was called up to the main roster. On July 10, Solarte was called back up to the Yankees in place of the injured Carlos Beltrán. Over 75 games with the Yankees in 2014, Solarte batted .254/.337/.381 with 6 home runs, making multiple starts at third and second base and one at shortstop.

=== San Diego Padres ===
On July 22, 2014, the Yankees traded Solarte and Rafael De Paula to the San Diego Padres in exchange for Chase Headley. One day later, Solarte made his Padres debut on the road against the Chicago Cubs. Solarte spent most of his time at third base in place of the departed Headley, but also made starts at second, shortstop, and in left field. With the Padres in 2014, he batted .267/.336/.355 with 4 home runs in 56 games.

In 2015, Solarte and Will Middlebrooks competed for the third base job in spring training. Solarte ended up taking on a super-utility role to begin the season, making 60 starts in the first half around the infield, including a run of 17 starts at first base while Yonder Alonso was on the disabled list with a shoulder injury. In the second half, Solarte became the everyday third basemen as Middlebrooks was demoted to Triple-A in July. On the season, Solarte batted .270/.320/.428 with 14 home runs in 152 games, including 85 starts at third base.

Solarte came into the 2016 season as the Padres starting third baseman. Solarte suffered a strained hamstring early on and missed 38 games in April and May. During the season, Solarte's wife developed complications from cancer, and he left the team for four days in July to attend to her. He again left the team in September when her condition worsened, and she died September 17. On December 15, 2016, it was announced that Solarte was the recipient of the Tony Conigliaro Award for his on-field achievements while overcoming personal tragedy. Solarte batted .286/.341/.467 on the season, with 15 home runs in 109 games.

In January 2017, the Padres signed Solarte to a two-year contract with a club option for two additional years. Coming into the season, manager Andy Green decided to have Solarte spend more time at second base and give playing time at third to Ryan Schimpf or Cory Spangenberg. Solarte was the regular second-baseman until June 20, when the Padres placed him on the 10-day disabled list with an oblique injury. Solarte didn't return until July 30, and the Padres prepared him for a role at shortstop, as Carlos Asuaje had played well at second base in his absence and Spangenberg had taken over third. Solarte moved around the infield after his return, including 24 starts at shortstop. For the season, he batted .255/.314/.416 with 18 home runs in 128 games. He made 74 starts at second base, 24 at short, 18 at third, and 4 at first.

=== Toronto Blue Jays ===
On January 6, 2018, the Padres traded Solarte to the Toronto Blue Jays for minor leaguers Edward Olivares and Jared Carkuff. Due to injuries to Josh Donaldson, Solarte became the Blue Jays' everyday third baseman for most of April 2018. On May 3, 2018, during the first game of a doubleheader against the Cleveland Indians, Solarte hit his first career grand slam, in the eleventh inning, as part of a 5-for-6, 6 RBI game, helping his Blue Jays to a 13–11 win. Later that day, he went 3-for-4 in the second game of the doubleheader, ending the day having gone 8-for-10 throughout the two games and setting a Blue Jays record for most hits in a doubleheader, with 8. Solarte quickly became a fan favorite in Toronto, but a tendency to not run out ground balls hurt his popularity as the season progressed. In the first half of the season, Solarte hit 16 home runs with 48 RBI's. In the second half, Solarte struggled through inconsistency and injury, hitting under .180 with only 1 home run in 30 games. On November 30, Solarte was non-tendered by the Blue Jays and became a free agent.

=== San Francisco Giants ===
On February 15, 2019, Solarte signed a minor league contract with the San Francisco Giants that included an invitation to spring training. On March 23, the Giants selected Solarte's contract after he made the team's Opening Day roster. In 28 appearances for San Francisco, he batted .205/.247/.315 with one home run and seven RBI. Solarte was designated for assignment by the Giants on May 7. He elected free agency on May 10.

=== Miami Marlins ===
On June 7, 2019, Solarte signed a minor league contract with the Miami Marlins. In 15 games for the Triple-A New Orleans Baby Cakes, he slashed .314/.346/.451 with one home run and nine RBI. Solarte was released by the Marlins organization on July 6.

=== Hanshin Tigers ===
On July 7, 2019, Solarte signed with the Hanshin Tigers of the Nippon Professional Baseball (NPB). On July 26, Solarte made his NPB debut against Yomiuri Giants, and hit his first NPB home run. After being sent to the farm team in mid-August, Solarte got recalled on September 6, but claimed he was not motivated to play anymore. On September 9, he was released.

=== Atlanta Braves ===
On January 15, 2020, the Atlanta Braves signed Solarte to a minor league contract that included an invitation to spring training. He did not play in a game in 2020 due to the cancellation of the minor league season because of the COVID-19 pandemic. Solarte was released by the Braves organization on August 27.

=== Diablos Rojos del México ===
On May 25, 2021, Solarte signed with the Diablos Rojos del México of the Mexican League. In 39 games, he hit .310/.357/.458 with 3 home runs and 26 RBI. Solarte became a free agent following the season.

=== Algodoneros de Unión Laguna ===
On January 19, 2022, Solarte signed with the Algodoneros de Unión Laguna. In 84 games for Unión Laguna, he batted .317/.390/.580 with 20 home runs and 74 RBI. Solarte was released on April 19, 2023.

On February 19, 2024, Solarte re–signed with the Algodoneros. In 20 games, he batted .219/.301/.329 with 2 home runs and 10 RBI. Solarte was released by Unión Laguna on May 18.

=== Guerreros de Oaxaca ===
On May 28, 2024, Solarte signed with the Guerreros de Oaxaca. In four games for the Guerreros, he went 2–for–11 (.182) with one RBI and one walk. On June 1, Solarte was released by Oaxaca.

=== El Águila de Veracruz ===
On January 11, 2025, Solarte signed with El Águila de Veracruz of the Mexican League. In 27 appearances for Veracruz, Solarte slashed .339/.380/.550 with five home runs, 26 RBI, and two stolen bases.

=== Leones de Yucatán ===
On May 19, 2025, Solarte was traded to the Leones de Yucatán. In 60 appearances for the Leones, he batted .326/.436/.535 with 12 home runs and 60 RBI. Solarte was released by Yucatán on November 24.

=== Conspiradores de Querétaro ===
On March 6, 2026, Solarte signed with the Conspiradores de Querétaro of the Mexican League.

== Personal life ==
Solarte has several nicknames "Pituki", "Tutu" and "Sexy Time".

Solarte's uncle is Roger Cedeño. Cedeño convinced his agent to take Solarte as a client as a favor. His wife, Yuliette Pimentel Solarte, died on September 17, 2016, due to complications from cancer. The couple have three daughters. He is remarried to Mehrnaz Bahari and they have a son.

== See also ==
- List of Major League Baseball players from Venezuela
