= Dean Anna =

American baseball player (born 1986)

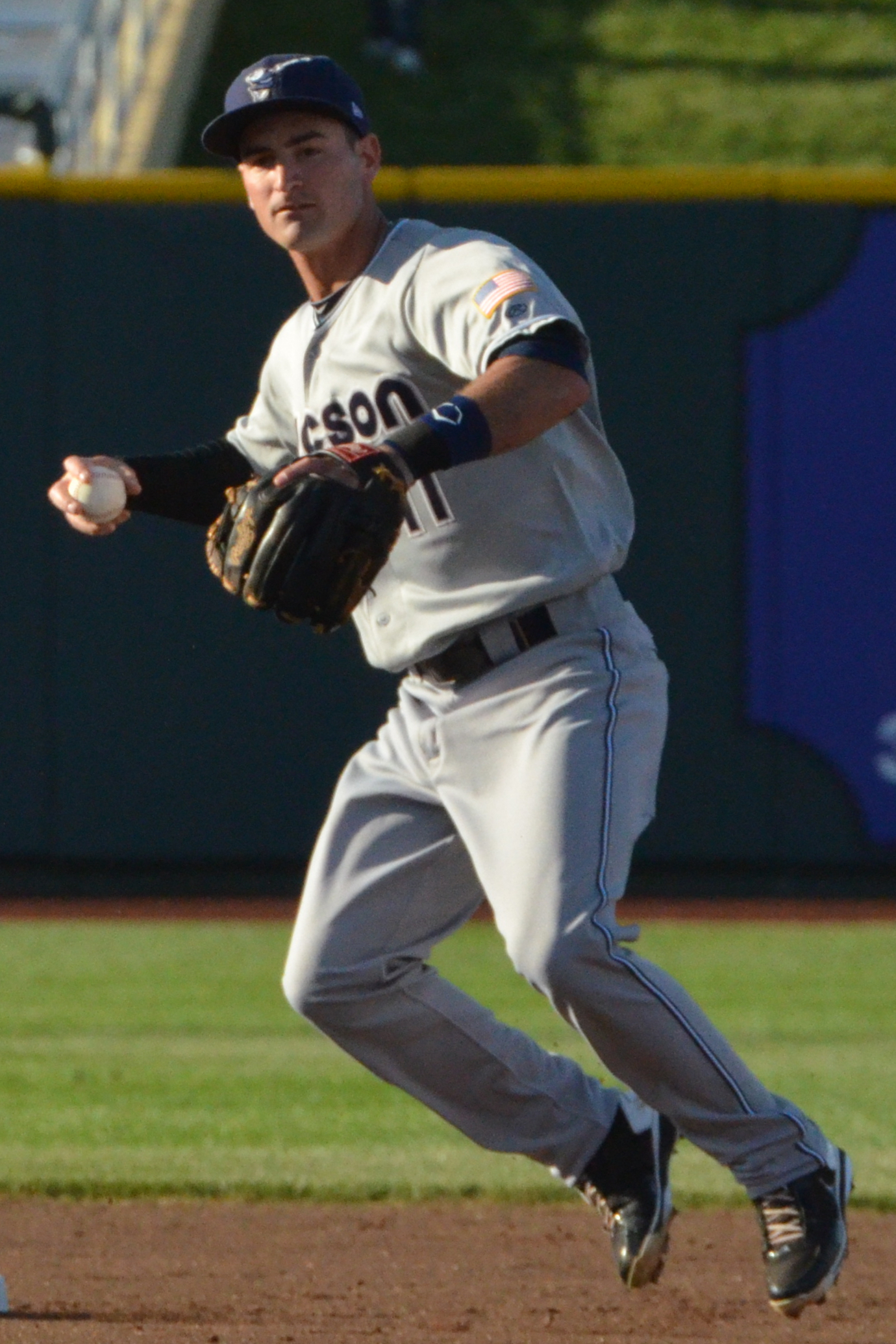
- Anna with the Tucson Padres in 2013
- Infielder
- Born: November 24, 1986 (age 39); Glenwood, Illinois, U.S.
- Batted: Left Threw: Right

MLB debut
- April 4, 2014, for the New York Yankees

Last MLB appearance
- April 23, 2015, for the St. Louis Cardinals

MLB statistics
- Batting average: .130
- Home runs: 1
- Runs batted in: 3
- Stats at Baseball Reference

Teams
- New York Yankees (2014); St. Louis Cardinals (2015)

Dean William Anna (born November 24, 1986) is an American former professional baseball infielder. He played in Major League Baseball (MLB) for the New York Yankees and St. Louis Cardinals.

== Career ==
=== Early career ===
Dean Anna was born on November 24, 1986, in Glenwood, Illinois. He graduated from Lincoln-Way East High School in Frankfort, Illinois. He attended John A. Logan College for two years and then transferred to Ball State University to continue his college baseball career with the Ball State Cardinals.

=== San Diego Padres ===
After his junior year of college, the San Diego Padres selected him in the 26th round of the 2008 Major League Baseball draft. On June 15, 2008, Anna signed with his Padres and began his professional career with the AZL Padres. In 43 appearances between the AZL Padres and the Low-A Eugene Emeralds, Anna slashed .232/.341/.351 with 5 home runs and 24 RBI. The next year, Anna split the year between Eugene and the Single-A Fort Wayne TinCaps, posting a .280/.380/.440 slash line with 5 home runs and 31 RBI. In 2010, Anna returned to Fort Wayne and posted career-highs in both home runs (6) and RBI (32). He split the 2011 season between the High-A Lake Elsinore Storm and the Double-A San Antonio Missions, batting .277/.391/.419 with 5 home runs and a career-high 41 RBI. In 2012, Anna spent the season in San Antonio, hitting .271/.377/.393 in 129 contests. In 2013, Anna spent the season with the Triple-A Tucson Padres, slashing .331/.410/.482 with 9 home runs and 73 RBI.

=== New York Yankees ===
On November 20, 2013, the Padres traded Anna to the New York Yankees for Ben Paullus and New York added him to their 40-man roster. In spring training in 2014, Anna competed with Eduardo Núñez, Zelous Wheeler, Yangervis Solarte, and Scott Sizemore for a reserve infielder role with the Yankees. Anna ultimately won a spot on the Yankees' Opening Day roster. Anna hit his first career home run on April 10, against Boston Red Sox pitcher Clay Buchholz.

On April 19, Anna pitched the eighth inning in a 16–1 loss to the Tampa Bay Rays, giving up two runs on three hits. The next day, he drew a game-winning bases-loaded walk in the 12th inning against Rays' pitcher C. J. Riefenhauser.

Anna was designated for assignment by the Yankees on July 3, 2014.

=== Pittsburgh Pirates ===
Anna was claimed off waivers by the Pittsburgh Pirates on July 5, 2014, and was assigned to the Triple-A Indianapolis Indians. He was designated for assignment on August 3 when Jayson Nix was signed by the Pirates. He was outrighted to Triple-A Indianapolis and finished the year with a .235/.398/.338 slash line with the team.

=== St. Louis Cardinals ===
Anna signed a major league contract with the St. Louis Cardinals on November 11, 2014. Anna spent most of the 2015 season with the Cardinals Triple-A affiliate, the Memphis Redbirds, but did appear in one at-bat for the Cardinals in an April 23 game against the Washington Nationals. In 125 games for Memphis, Anna slashed .272/.382/.355 with 3 home runs and 44 RBI. Anna returned to Memphis in 2016, slashing .266/.344/.341 with 2 home runs and 39 RBI in 106 games for the team. On September 4, 2016, Anna was designated for assignment by the Cardinals. He was released by the organization on September 7.

=== Kansas City Royals ===
Anna signed a minor league contract with the Kansas City Royals organization on January 21, 2017. He was assigned to the Triple-A Omaha Storm Chasers, where he batted .285/.364/.376 with 5 home runs and 33 RBI in 114 games. He elected free agency on November 6, 2017.

=== Philadelphia Phillies ===
On January 24, 2018, Anna signed a minor league contract with the Chicago White Sox organization. On March 28, Anna was traded to the Philadelphia Phillies organization and was assigned to the Triple-A Lehigh Valley IronPigs. In 122 games for Lehigh Valley, Anna posted a .271/.367/.341 slash line with one home run and 34 RBI. He elected free agency following the season on November 2.

=== Minnesota Twins ===
On December 11, 2018, Anna signed a minor league contract with the Minnesota Twins organization. On February 18, 2019, Anna announced his retirement from professional baseball.
