= Scott Sizemore =

American baseball player (born 1985)

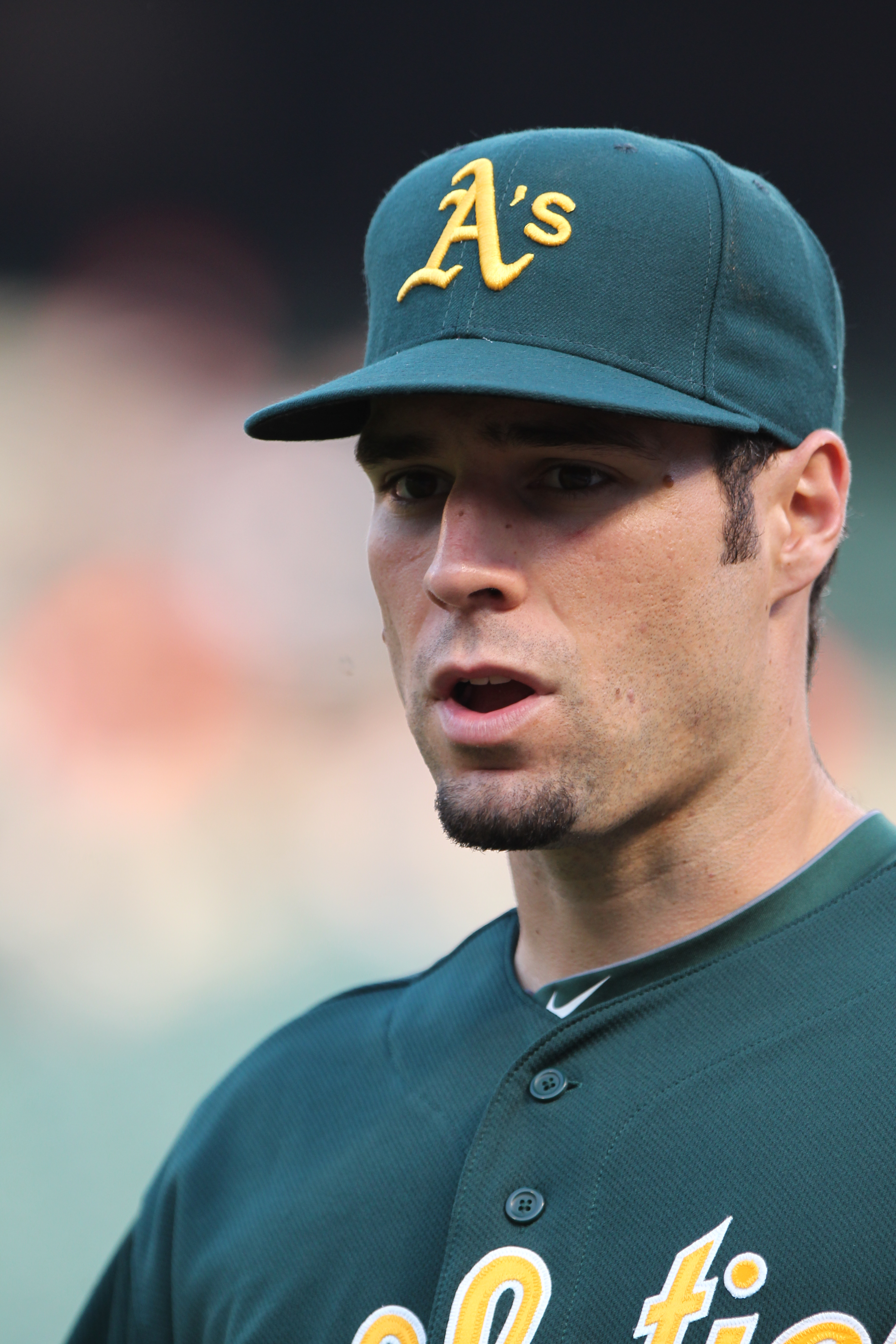
- Sizemore with the Oakland Athletics
- Third baseman / Second baseman
- Born: January 4, 1985 (age 41); Virginia Beach, Virginia, U.S.
- Batted: Right Threw: Right

MLB debut
- April 5, 2010, for the Detroit Tigers

Last MLB appearance
- June 3, 2014, for the New York Yankees

MLB statistics
- Batting average: .240
- Home runs: 14
- Runs batted in: 74
- Stats at Baseball Reference

Teams
- Detroit Tigers (2010–2011); Oakland Athletics (2011, 2013); New York Yankees (2014)

Scott Daniel Sizemore (born January 4, 1985) is an American former Major League Baseball (MLB) infielder who played for the Detroit Tigers, Oakland Athletics, and New York Yankees from 2010 to 2014.

== Early life ==
Sizemore was born in Virginia Beach, Virginia and graduated from Hickory High School in Chesapeake, Virginia. He played college baseball at the Virginia Commonwealth University. In 2005, he played collegiate summer baseball for the Harwich Mariners of the Cape Cod Baseball League and was named a league all-star.

== Professional career ==
=== Detroit Tigers ===
Sizemore was drafted by the Tigers in the fifth round of the 2006 Major League Baseball draft. In 2009, Sizemore was rated Detroit's 7th best prospect by Baseball America.

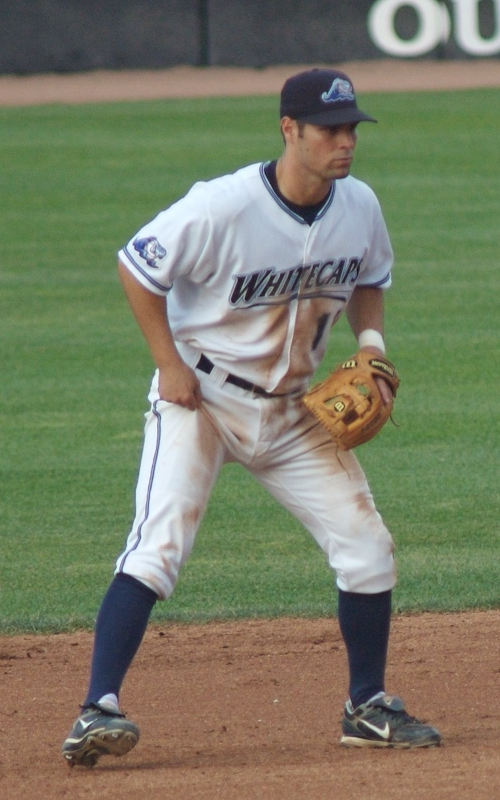
Sizemore with the West Michigan White Caps in 2007

On October 23, 2009, Sizemore broke his left leg during a collision while playing in the Arizona Fall League the previous day. On October 27, Sizemore had surgery on his fractured left ankle, including screws being inserted to stabilize his ankle joint. He was able to return to action in time for Spring Training in 2010.

On April 9, 2010, Sizemore got his first major league hit (a single) against the Cleveland Indians. Detroit won the game 5–2. On April 11, Sizemore got his first extra base hit (a double) and an RBI in the bottom of the Seventh at Comerica Park against the Cleveland Indians.

Sizemore hit his first major league home run off Los Angeles Angels pitcher Joel Piñeiro on April 30, 2010. Coming in the same inning as Brennan Boesch's first career home run, it was the first time two Tigers had hit their first career home runs in the same inning since Pop Dillon and Kid Elberfeld did it in 1901.

Detroit optioned Sizemore back to the Triple-A Toledo Mud Hens on May 16, 2010. Sizemore's average had slumped to .206 and he was in the midst of an 0–14 streak. Detroit recalled newcomer Danny Worth from Toledo and transferred veteran Carlos Guillén to second base.

Sizemore was called up again on July 21 to play third base in place of the injured Brandon Inge.

On May 3, 2011, Sizemore was called up again to the 25 man roster, replacing second baseman Will Rhymes. In his first game back, Sizemore faced the Yankees and went 3 for 4 with a double and an RBI. The 4–2 win for the Tigers also snapped a seven-game slide.

=== Oakland Athletics ===
On May 27, 2011, the Tigers traded Sizemore to the Oakland Athletics for David Purcey.

On June 6, 2011, Sizemore was called up by the Athletics. While he debuted in the majors as a second baseman, he converted to play third base for the Athletics, who sent Kevin Kouzmanoff to Triple-A. Sizemore finished the 2011 season with the Athletics, batting .249 over 93 games with 11 home runs and 52 RBIs.

On February 27, 2012, it was announced that Sizemore tore his anterior cruciate ligament (ACL) in his left knee, causing him to miss the entire 2012 season. On April 10, 2013, it was announced that Sizemore re-tore his ACL in his left knee, causing him to miss the rest of the 2013 season. Sizemore was placed on the 60-day disabled list on April 22 to make room for Casper Wells. He elected free agency on November 20, 2013.

=== New York Yankees ===
Sizemore signed a minor league deal with the New York Yankees on January 13, 2014. In spring training in 2014, Sizemore competed with Eduardo Núñez, Zelous Wheeler, Dean Anna, and Yangervis Solarte for a reserve infielder role with the Yankees.

On April 15, 2014, Sizemore's contract was purchased from the Scranton/Wilkes-Barre RailRiders by the Yankees, adding him to their 40-man roster, to replace catcher Francisco Cervelli who was placed on the 60-day Disabled List. After multiple trips between the majors and minors, he was optioned back to Scranton on June 5. Sizemore was released by the Yankees on July 31. He re-signed to a minor league contract on August 9.

=== Miami Marlins ===
On January 2, 2015, Sizemore signed a minor league contract with the Miami Marlins and was assigned to the Triple–A New Orleans Zephyrs. He was released on July 13 after posting just a .223 batting average at Triple–A.

=== Washington Nationals ===
Sizemore signed a minor league deal with the Washington Nationals in August 2015. On November 20, he re-signed with the Nationals organization. Sizemore was released on July 4, 2016.

Sizemore ended his playing career following the 2016 season.

== Personal life ==
Sizemore is married to Brooke Sizemore.
