= Eduardo Núñez =

Dominican baseball player (born 1987)

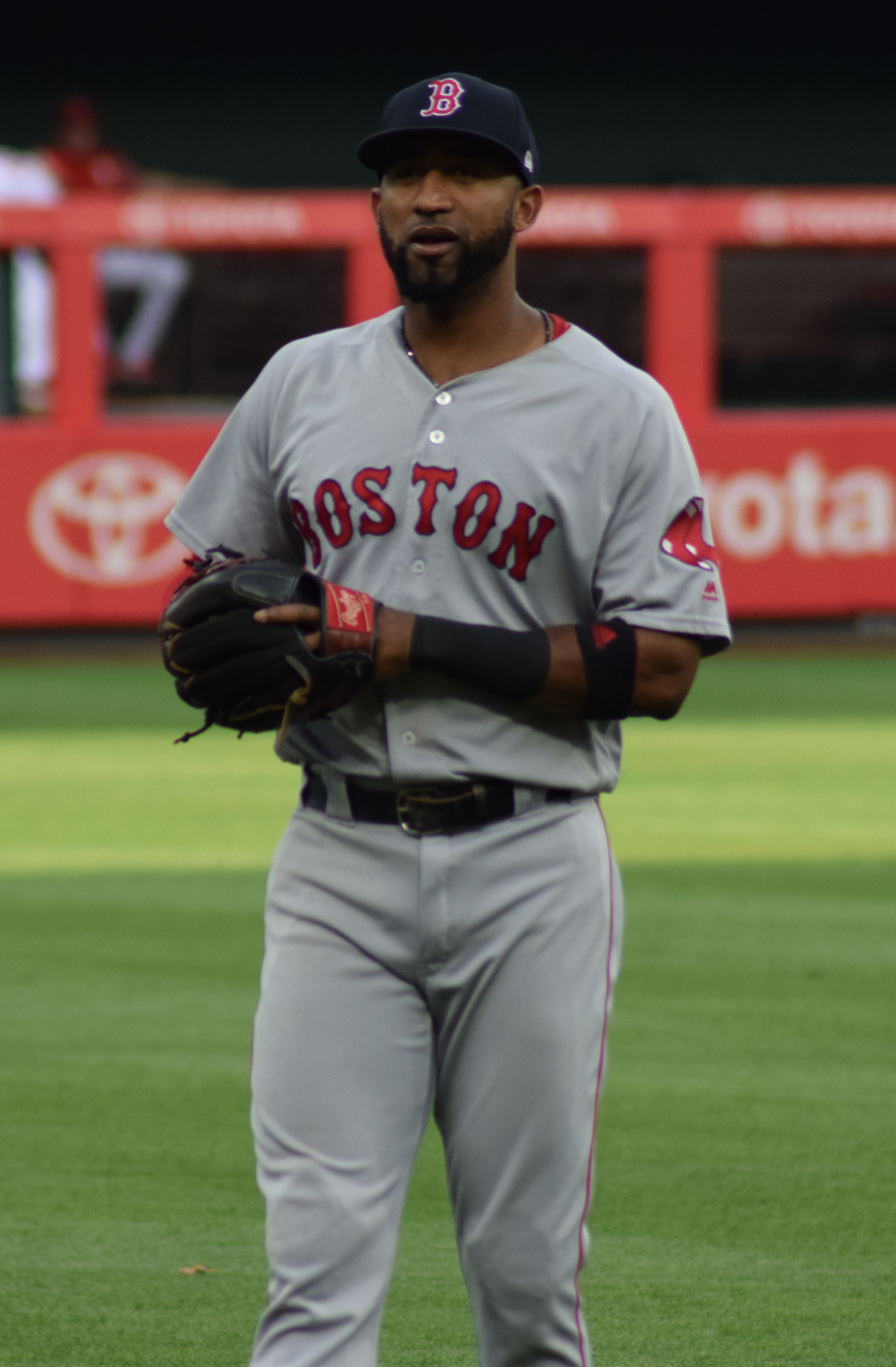
- Núñez with the Boston Red Sox in 2018
- Infielder
- Born: June 15, 1987 (age 39); Santo Domingo, Dominican Republic
- Batted: Right Threw: Right

MLB debut
- August 19, 2010, for the New York Yankees

Last MLB appearance
- July 26, 2020, for the New York Mets

MLB statistics
- Batting average: .276
- Home runs: 58
- Runs batted in: 309
- Stats at Baseball Reference

Teams
- New York Yankees (2010–2013); Minnesota Twins (2014–2016); San Francisco Giants (2016–2017); Boston Red Sox (2017–2019); New York Mets (2020)

Career highlights and awards
- All-Star (2016); World Series champion (2018)

Eduardo Michelle Núñez Méndez (born June 15, 1987) is a Dominican former professional baseball infielder. He played in Major League Baseball (MLB) for the New York Yankees, Minnesota Twins, San Francisco Giants, Boston Red Sox, and the New York Mets. He also played for the Fubon Guardians of the Chinese Professional Baseball League (CPBL) for one year. Núñez serves primarily as a utility infielder - playing third base, shortstop and second base - and has played in the outfield as well.

The Yankees signed Núñez as an international free agent in 2004. He played minor league baseball in their organization from 2005 through 2010, until he made his MLB debut with the Yankees on August 19, 2010. Due to struggles and inconsistency, Núñez was designated for assignment by the Yankees at the start of the 2014 season. He was traded to the Twins, and enjoyed a breakout season in 2016, when he was named to appear in the MLB All-Star Game. He was traded to the Giants in 2016, and to the Red Sox in 2017. In July 2019, Núñez was designated for assignment and then released by the Red Sox. He signed a minor league contract with the New York Mets in 2020.

== Professional career ==
=== New York Yankees ===
The New York Yankees signed Núñez as an international free agent in February 2004. The organization introduced him to Derek Jeter, his childhood idol, at a press conference, where they told Jeter that Núñez was to be their eventual replacement for Jeter as the Yankees' starting shortstop.

Núñez made his professional debut in minor league baseball with the Staten Island Yankees of the Class A Short Season New York–Pennsylvania League in the 2005 season. Nunez represented the Yankees in the league's All-Star Game. That season, the Yankees won their third consecutive league championship, and Nunez was rated as the fourth-best prospect in the New York–Penn League. Going into the 2006 season, Baseball America ranked Núñez the sixth-best prospect in the Yankees organization, and the prospect with the best throwing arm. The Yankees started Núñez with the Tampa Yankees of the Class A-Advanced Florida State League in 2006; he struggled with Tampa, and the Yankees demoted him to the Charleston RiverDogs of the Class A South Atlantic League (SAL) on May 17. Overall, Núñez had a .214 batting average for Tampa and Charleston.

In 2007, Núñez started the season with Charleston, and was named the starting shortstop for the Southern Division in the SAL All-Star Game. He was promoted to Tampa on July 28. He played for Tampa in 2008, batting .271 with six home runs and 42 runs batted in (RBI) in 94 games. He was promoted to the Trenton Thunder of the Class AA Eastern League for the 2009 season. With Trenton, he had a .322 batting average in 123 games and appeared in the Eastern League All-Star Game, in which he got two hits. The Yankees promoted Núñez to the Scranton/Wilkes-Barre Yankees of the Class AAA International League for the 2009 playoffs. Following the 2009 season, the Yankees added Núñez to their 40-man roster to protect him from being selected by another franchise in the Rule 5 draft. In 2010, the Yankees assigned Núñez to Scranton/Wilkes-Barre. There, he batted .289 in 118 games, with 55 runs scored, 25 doubles, three triples, four home runs, 50 RBI, and 23 stolen bases. He was named to the International League All-Star team, the postseason All-Star team, and the Topps Triple-A All-Star Team. Núñez won the Kevin Lawn Award as the Yankees' minor league player of the year for 2010.

Núñez was called up to the majors for the first time on August 19, 2010, after Lance Berkman was placed on the 15-day disabled list. Núñez debuted on the same day, replacing Jeter in the seventh inning and fouling out in his only plate appearance. Núñez received playing time as a fill-in for Jeter and the then-injured Alex Rodriguez. On August 21, Núñez recorded his first major league hit, a go-ahead RBI single into right field. Núñez hit his first career home run against the Chicago White Sox on August 28, 2010. He also stole his first career base the same day. In 30 games for the Yankees, Núñez hit .280, with one home run, seven RBIs, and scored 12 runs. When Mark Teixeira suffered an injury during the 2010 American League Championship Series, the Yankees replaced him on their postseason roster with Núñez. After the season, Baseball America rated him as the eighth-best prospect in the Yankees organization, while also naming him the "Best Defensive Infielder" and the "Best Infield Arm" in the Yankees organization.

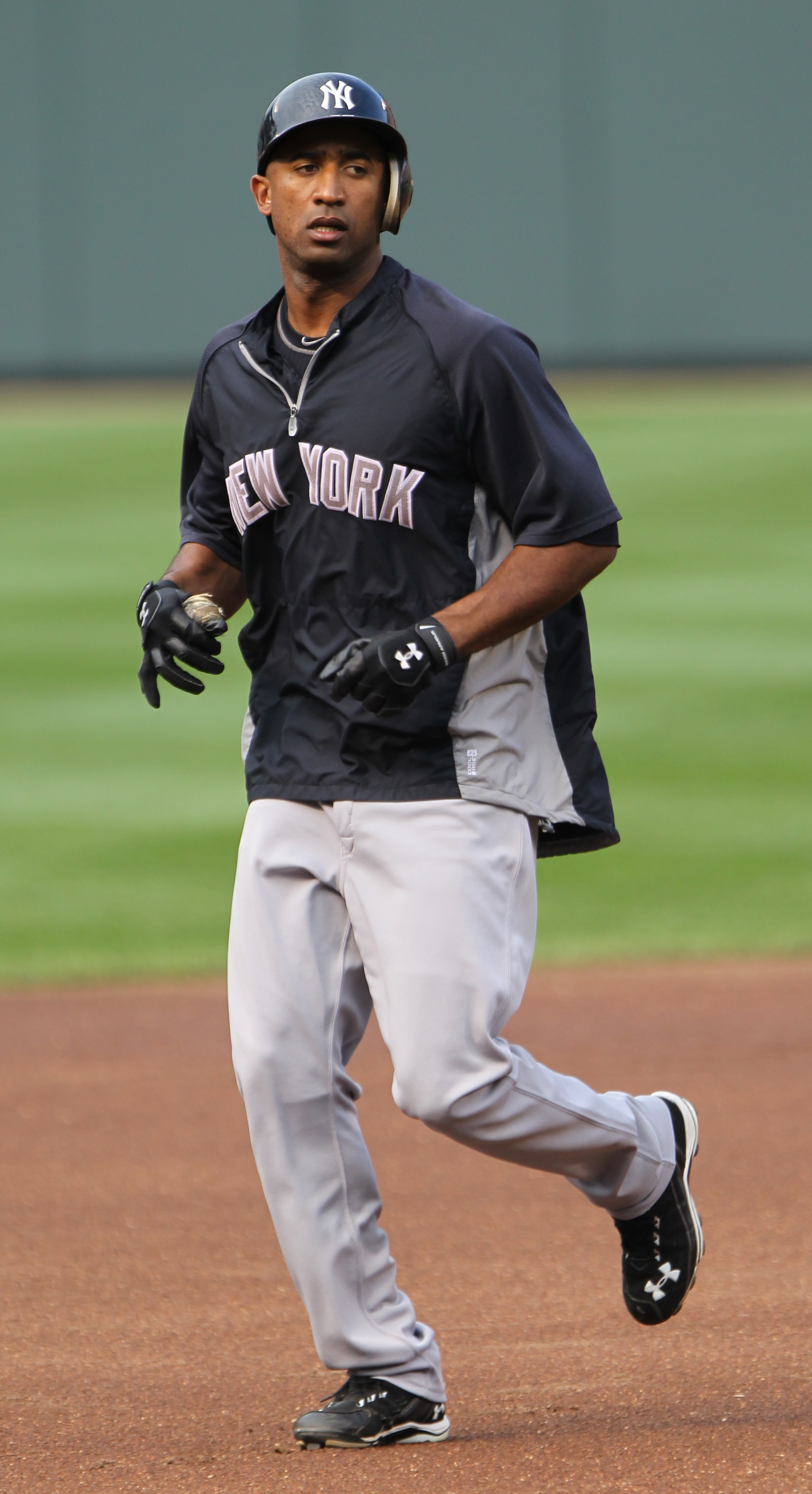
Núñez with the New York Yankees in 2011

Núñez beat out Ramiro Peña for the role as the utility infielder to start the 2011 season. With the Yankees, Núñez played approximately two games a week, allowing Derek Jeter and Alex Rodriguez to rest more often. Núñez batted .339 while filling in for the Yankees as their starting shortstop for three weeks while Jeter was injured; he later became the team's starting third baseman when Rodriguez required arthroscopic knee surgery. In addition to playing various infield positions, manager Joe Girardi also used Núñez as an outfielder when Nick Swisher experienced tendinitis in his elbow. Núñez played in 112 games for the Yankees, and led the team in errors with 20, despite only playing part-time.

Despite his defensive struggles, the Yankees viewed Núñez as likely to make their 25-man roster out of spring training in 2012 as a utility infielder. With Brett Gardner, the Yankees' starting left fielder, injuring his elbow, Núñez received playing time in left field, as well as the infield. In his first twenty games of the 2012 New York Yankees season, Núñez hit .294, but committed four errors in 58 chances. The day after he committed two errors in a game against the Tampa Bay Rays, Núñez was demoted to the Triple-A Scranton/Wilkes-Barre team. The team decided to abandon their approach of using Núñez as a utility player so that he can receive daily playing time at shortstop and second base, as the organization still views him as an everyday shortstop.

On September 1, 2012, the Yankees promoted Núñez from Triple-A and manager Joe Girardi placed him into the starting lineup against the Baltimore Orioles for that day. He finished the regular season with a .292 batting average in 82 at-bats. Though he was left off of the Yankees' postseason roster for the 2012 American League Championship Series, he was added to the roster when Jeter suffered a fractured ankle. In Game 3 of the 2012 ALCS, Núñez hit his first career postseason home run off of Tigers pitcher Justin Verlander. The Yankees lost the series to the Tigers in a 4-game sweep.

Heading into the 2013 season, Yankees' General Manager Brian Cashman said that if Núñez were to make the team, he would do so as a utility infielder, reversing the team's position. However, Núñez only played shortstop during spring training. Jeter began the season on the disabled list, and Núñez started at shortstop for the Yankees on Opening Day. Núñez was placed on the 15-day disabled list on May 12 after missing the previous week due to soreness in his left rib cage. He was then transferred to the 60-day disabled list due to a strained left oblique. He was activated from the disabled list on July 6 after missing 2 months. He ended the season with a .260 batting average and 28 RBIs in 90 games played.

In spring training in 2014, Núñez competed with Zelous Wheeler, Yangervis Solarte, Dean Anna, and Scott Sizemore for a reserve infielder role with the Yankees. With reserve infielder Brendan Ryan starting the season on the disabled list, the Yankees chose Anna and Solarte over Núñez. To add Solarte to the roster, the Yankees designated Núñez for assignment.

=== Minnesota Twins ===
With the hope of improving their offense, the Minnesota Twins acquired Núñez from the Yankees on April 7, 2014, in exchange for minor league pitcher Miguel Sulbaran. The Twins optioned him to the Rochester Red Wings of the International League. After batting 7-for-22 (.318) for Rochester, he was promoted to the Twins as the 26th man on their roster for a doubleheader on April 17, and was optioned back the next day. He finished the season with a .250 batting average in 72 games played with the Twins.

Núñez and the Twins agreed to a $1.025 million salary for the 2015 season, avoiding salary arbitration. In 72 games in 2015, Núñez hit .282/.327/.431 with 4 HR and 20 RBI across 4 positions for the Twins.

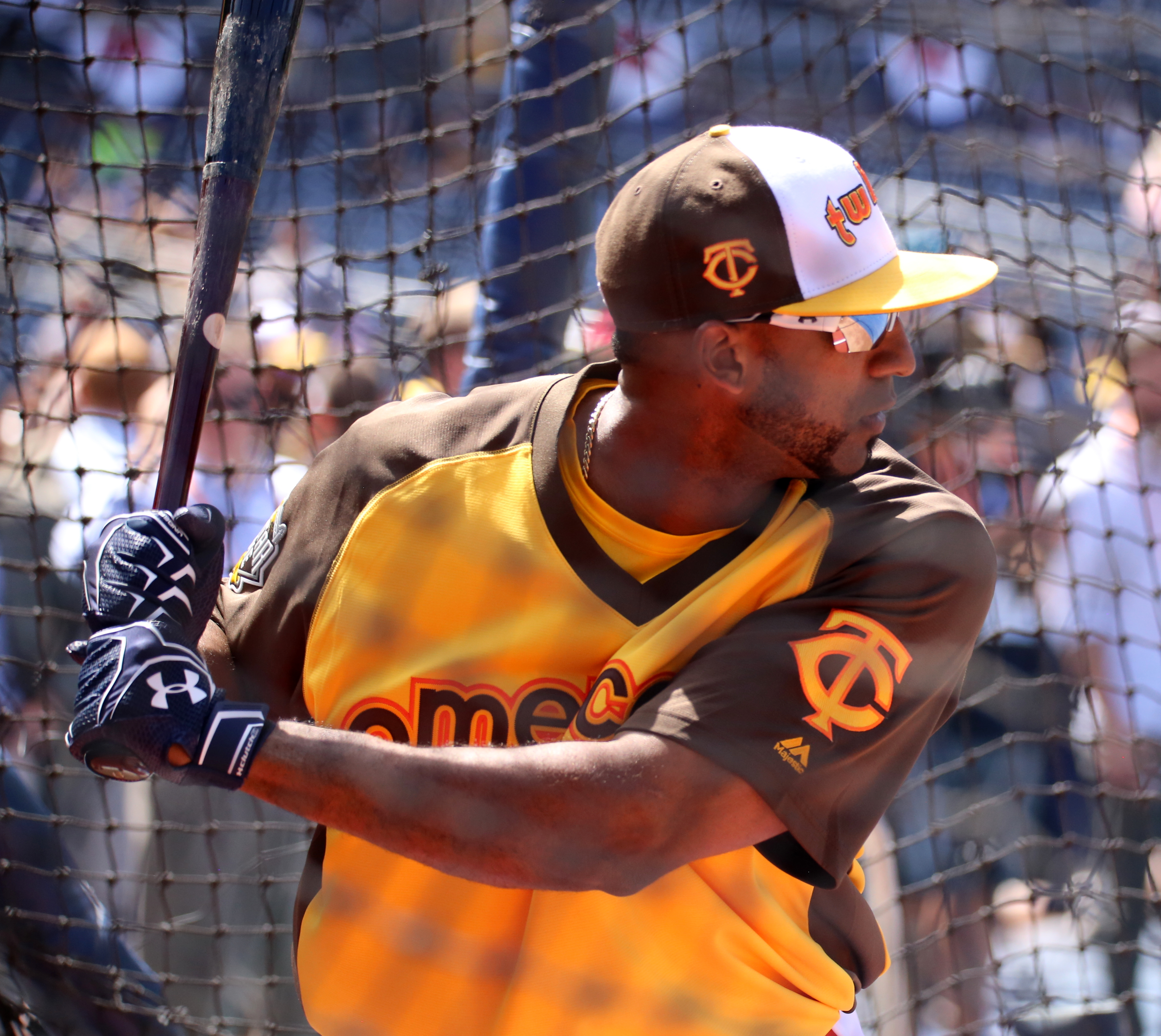
Núñez taking batting practice in 2016 All-Star Game

Avoiding arbitration with the Twins at $1.475 million for the 2016 season, Núñez entered the season expecting to compete for a reserve role. On the Twins Opening Day roster in 2016, Núñez impressed in April, hitting .373 in 18 games in a reserve role. However, following an injury to shortstop Eduardo Escobar, Núñez began earning more playing time as the team's starting shortstop. With an injury to third baseman Trevor Plouffe, Núñez remained in the lineup following Escobar's return. He became the Twins' leadoff hitter. On July 5, Núñez was named to his first All-Star Game. In 91 games with the Twins to begin 2016, Núñez batted .296 with 27 stolen bases, 12 home runs, and 47 RBI.

=== San Francisco Giants ===
On July 28, 2016, the Twins traded Núñez to the San Francisco Giants for left-handed minor league pitcher Adalberto Mejía. In 50 games with the Giants to finish 2016, Núñez batted .269 with 13 stolen bases, 4 home runs, and 20 RBI. Overall in 2016, combined with both teams, Núñez played 141 total games with a .288 batting average, 40 stolen bases, 16 home runs, and 67 RBI.

To begin 2017, Núñez played 76 games with the Giants, batting .308 with 18 stolen bases, 4 home runs, and 31 RBI.

=== Boston Red Sox ===
On July 25, 2017, the Giants traded Núñez to the Boston Red Sox for minor league pitchers Shaun Anderson and Gregory Santos. On September 9, Núñez injured his right knee, later diagnosed as a sprained posterior cruciate ligament. He returned to the Red Sox lineup on September 25, but left the game after aggravating the injury. In finishing the 2017 regular season with the Red Sox, Núñez played 38 games with a .321 batting average and eight home runs. For both teams combined in 2017, Núñez played 114 regular season games with a .313 batting average, 12 home runs, and 58 RBIs. The Red Sox included Núñez on their roster for the ALDS against the Houston Astros. He started in Game 1, but collapsed while trying to run out a ground ball in his first at bat, and needed to be carried off the field. The Red Sox removed him from their postseason roster due to the injury.

On February 18, 2018, the Red Sox signed Núñez to a one-year contract worth $4 million with a player option worth $4 million for the 2019 season. On Opening Day against the Tampa Bay Rays, he hit an inside-the-park home run. During the regular season, Núñez appeared in 127 games—including 70 starts at second base primarily due to Dustin Pedroia being on the disabled list—batting .265/.289/.388 with 10 home runs and 44 RBIs. Núñez was included on Boston's postseason roster, appearing in three games of the ALDS and two games of the ALCS. In Game 1 of the World Series against the Los Angeles Dodgers, he hit a pinch-hit three-run home run in his first World Series at bat off of Alex Wood in the seventh inning to put the Red Sox up 8–4, which would be the final score. It was the first pinch-hit homer of Núñez's career, as well as the first pinch-hit home run in the World Series since 2009. Núñez became the 36th player to hit a home run in his first at bat in a World Series, following Matt Kemp who became the 35th player to do so, earlier in the same game. Boston won the World Series in five games, giving Núñez his first career championship title.

Núñez was the Opening Day starting second baseman for the 2019 Red Sox, as Dustin Pedroia began the season on the injured list. On April 5, Núñez made his major league pitching debut, allowing one run in an inning of relief during a 15–8 loss to the Arizona Diamondbacks. He was placed on the injured list, effective April 18, due to a mid-back strain. On April 29, Núñez was sent on a rehabilitation assignment with the Triple-A Pawtucket Red Sox, and he was activated on May 4. Núñez was designated for assignment on July 15, and released on July 20. With the Red Sox in 2019, Núñez appeared in 60 games, batting .228 with two home runs and 20 RBIs.

=== New York Mets ===
On January 25, 2020, Núñez signed a minor league deal with the New York Mets. Núñez made the Opening Day roster for the Mets. In a late July game, Núñez suffered a left knee contusion and was placed on the injured list on July 30. He became a free agent after the season.

=== Fubon Guardians ===
On April 6, 2021, Núñez signed with the Fubon Guardians of the Chinese Professional Baseball League (CPBL). Núñez played in seven games for Fubon, going 8-for-25 with one home run and five RBI. Núñez was released by the Guardians on September 29.

On October 20, 2022, Núñez announced his retirement from professional baseball.

== Scouting profile ==
The Yankees viewed Núñez as a possible replacement at shortstop for Jeter. Though they were willing to trade Jesús Montero, their top hitting prospect, the Yankees considered Núñez untouchable in trade negotiations. Scouts considered Núñez's throwing arm to be strong, complementing his ability to hit for average, hit for power, and baserunning ability. However, scouts felt he could get "lackadaisical in the field" and swing at too many pitches outside of the strike zone.

== See also ==
- New York Yankees award winners and league leaders
