= 2014 Los Angeles Dodgers season =

2014 Los Angeles Dodgers
- National League West champions
- League: National League
- Division: West
- Ballpark: Dodger Stadium
- City: Los Angeles, California
- Record: 94–68 (58%)
- Divisional place: 1st place
- Owners: Guggenheim Baseball Management
- President: Stan Kasten
- General managers: Ned Colletti
- Managers: Don Mattingly
- Television: SportsNet LA (Vin Scully, Charley Steiner, Orel Hershiser, Nomar Garciaparra); KDOC (SportNet simulcast, last 6 games only)
- Radio: KLAC (Vin Scully, Charley Steiner, Rick Monday, Nomar Garciaparra, Kevin Kennedy); KTNQ (Jaime Jarrín, Pepe Yñiguez, Fernando Valenzuela)

The 2014 Los Angeles Dodgers season was the 125th for the franchise in Major League Baseball, and their 57th season in Los Angeles. On April 30, the Dodgers picked up their 10,000th win since joining the National League in 1890. They proceeded to win their second straight National League West championship but lost in four games to the St. Louis Cardinals in the NLDS.

Several players had excellent years: Adrián González led the major leagues in runs batted in; Dee Gordon led the major leagues in stolen bases and triples and Clayton Kershaw led the major leagues in earned run average and wins. In addition, both Kershaw and Josh Beckett pitched no-hitters during the season. Kershaw won the NL Cy Young Award and the NL MVP Award, making him the first National League player to win both awards in the same season since Bob Gibson in 1968.

== Offseason ==
=== SportsNet LA ===
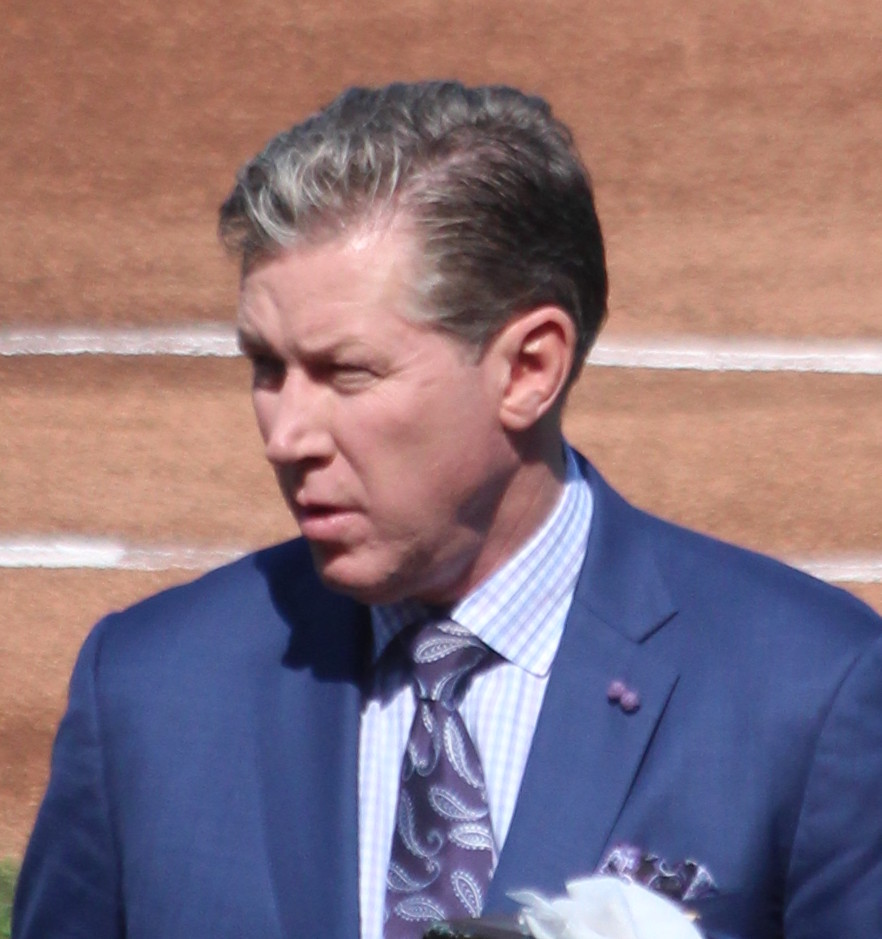
Former Dodger Orel Hershiser joined the team's broadcast crew for 2014.

After the 2013 season, the Dodgers ended their broadcast agreements with Prime Ticket and KCAL-TV. They entered into an agreement with Time Warner Cable to start their own regional sports network, to be called SportsNet LA, to begin with the 2014 season. This marked the end of over-the-air broadcasts of Dodger games, which had begun in 1949. On October 12, 2013, they announced that they would not be retaining the broadcasting team of Steve Lyons and Eric Collins who had worked road games for the team since 2005 (Lyons) and 2009 (Collins). On December 2, 2013, the team announced that former Dodger Nomar Garciaparra would be part of the new broadcast team. On December 8, it was announced that Orel Hershiser would also be joining the broadcast team as a television game analyst for road games and that Alanna Rizzo would be joining the pre and post game shows. On December 11, Jerry Hairston Jr. announced that he was retiring from baseball to join the Dodgers pre and post game broadcasting team. On January 22, 2014, it was announced that KLAC radio announcer Charley Steiner would move to the TV booth to call road games with Hershiser, while Garciaparra would call road radio broadcasts with Rick Monday. Vin Scully, in his 65th year with the Dodgers, would continue to call all home telecasts as well as road games from Arizona and San Francisco. The new network officially launched on February 25, 2014. However, a season long dispute between Time Warner Cable and other content providers, most notably DirecTV, led to the new channel only being available in homes that were served by Time Warner Cable itself.

In September 2014, it was announced that in response to the lack of carriage for SportsNet LA, the Dodgers' final six games of the regular season would be aired by local independent station KDOC-TV—an over-the-air channel that is carried by all major television providers in the region.

As a result of their lack of distribution carriage for the 2014 season, the Dodgers saw a 70% drop in television ratings compared to the previous season when they were on Prime Ticket and the poorest cable performance by the team since at least the mid-1990s. The ratings for Dodger games were second lowest in the Majors, ahead of only the Houston Astros, who had similar issues with their cable provider, CSN Houston.

=== Coaching staff ===
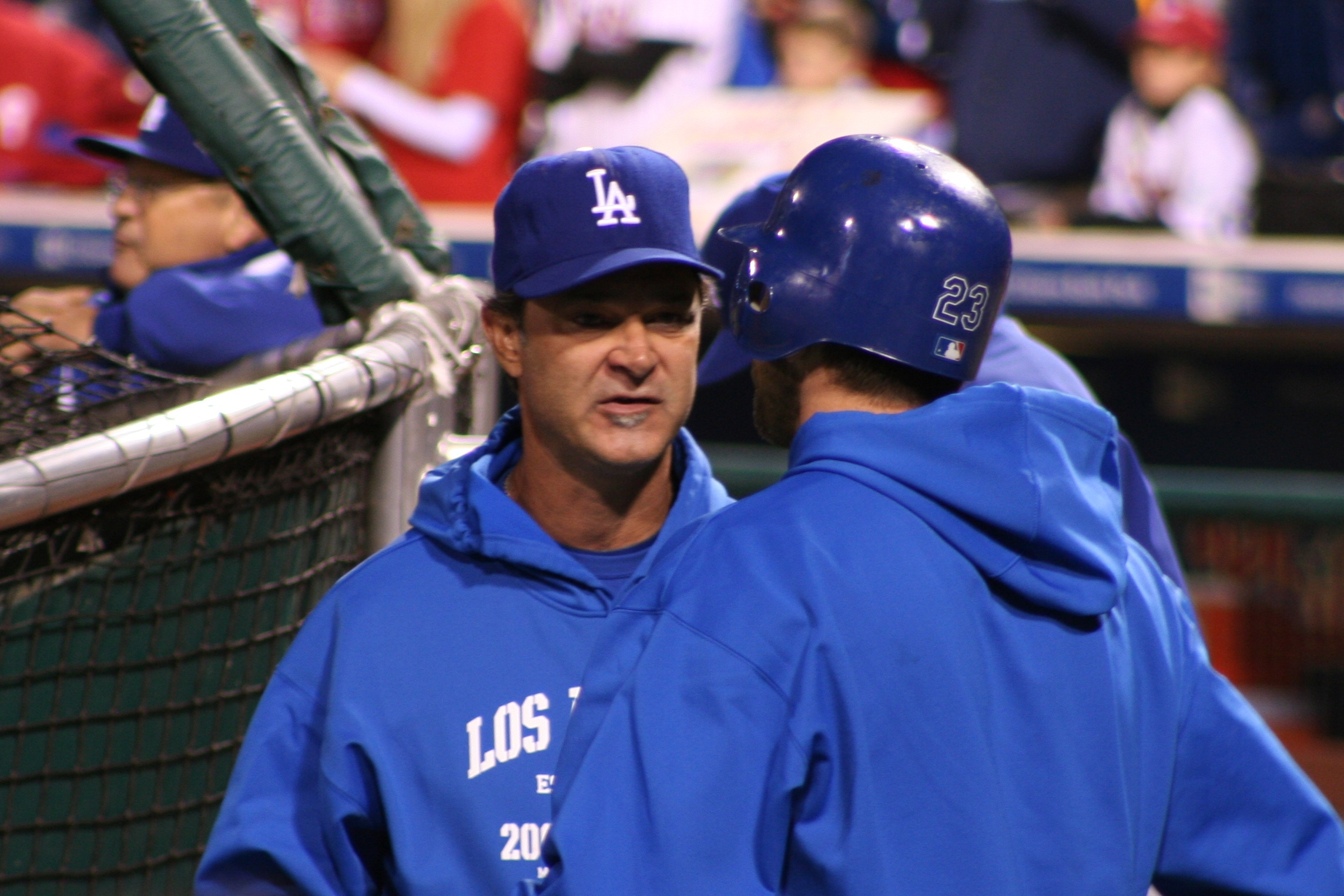
Don Mattingly signed a three-year contract extension with the Dodgers

On October 21, 2013, the team announced that Head Athletic Trainer Sue Falsone, the first woman to hold that position in a Major sport, would be stepping down to pursue other opportunities. The following day, the team fired bench coach Trey Hillman, who had been on the staff since 2011. The team also announced that they had chosen to pick up the options on pitching coach Rick Honeycutt, and base coaches Davey Lopes and Tim Wallach, bringing them back for 2014.

On November 11, the team announced that Wallach would be promoted to the vacant bench coach position and that AAA Albuquerque manager Lorenzo Bundy would become the new third base coach. They also confirmed that manager Don Mattingly and the rest of the coaching staff would be retained for 2014. Mattingly agreed to a three-year extension on January 7.

=== Player departures ===
On October 31, 2013, several Dodgers automatically became free agents the morning after the 2013 World Series ended. They included pitchers J. P. Howell, Carlos Mármol, Ricky Nolasco, Edinson Vólquez, and Brian Wilson, third baseman Juan Uribe and utility players Jerry Hairston Jr., Nick Punto, Skip Schumaker, and Michael Young. The same day, the Dodgers declined their 2014 options on second baseman Mark Ellis and pitcher Chris Capuano, making them both free agents as well. Utility player Elián Herrera was claimed off waivers by the Milwaukee Brewers on November 5. On November 20, relief pitcher Shawn Tolleson was claimed off waivers by the Texas Rangers. On December 3, the Dodgers chose not to tender a contract to arbitration-eligible pitcher Ronald Belisario, making him a free agent.

=== Trades ===
On October 23, 2013, the Dodgers traded OF Alex Castellanos to the Boston Red Sox in exchange for minor league OF Jeremy Hazelbaker and cash. The Dodgers acquired RHP Seth Rosin from the New York Mets on December 12, 2013, after the Mets selected him from the Philadelphia Phillies in the Rule 5 draft.

=== Player signings ===
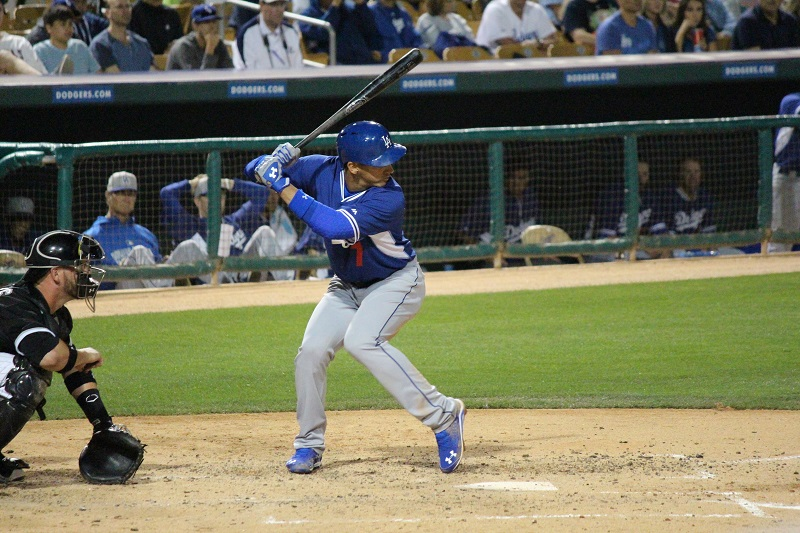
Cuban infielder Alex Guerrero was signed to a free agent contract in the off-season.

On October 22, 2013, the Dodgers announced the signing of Cuban middle-infielder Alex Guerrero to a four-year deal, worth $32 million with incentives. On November 25, the Dodgers announced the signing of pitcher Dan Haren to a one-year, $10 million contract, that included a vesting player option for 2015. On December 5, the Dodgers re-signed relief pitcher Brian Wilson to a one-year, $10 million contract, that included a player option for 2015 and on December 14, they agreed to terms with third baseman Juan Uribe on a two-year, $15 million, extension. On December 17, relief pitcher J. P. Howell re-signed on a two-year, $11.25 million, contract. The team added to an already deep bullpen on December 23, by agreeing to separate one-year contracts with Jamey Wright and Chris Perez.

On January 15, 2014, the Dodgers agreed to a seven-year, $215 million, contract extension with pitcher Clayton Kershaw. The deal was the largest contract for a pitcher, eclipsing Justin Verlander's deal from the previous year.

== Spring training ==
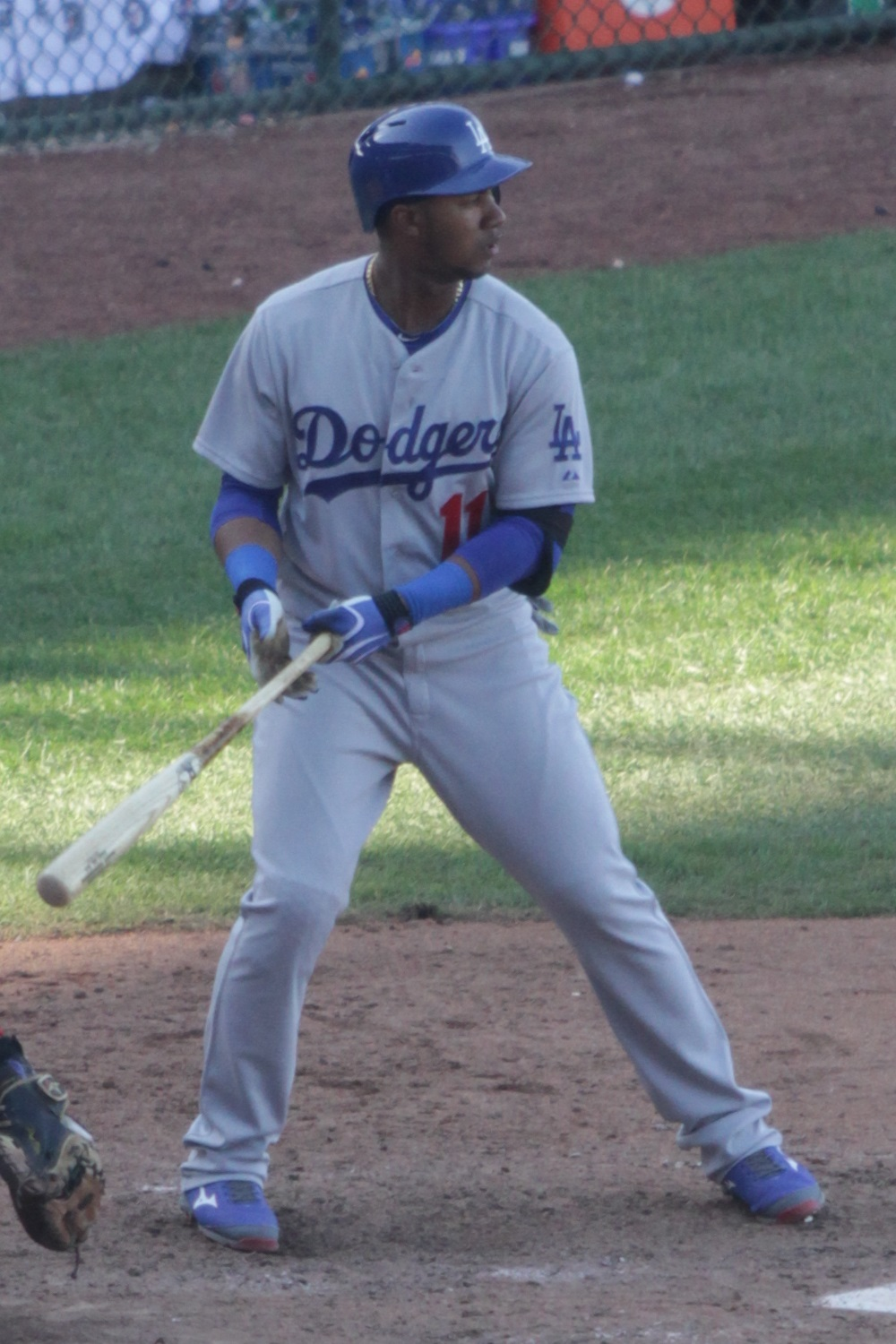
Erisbel Arruebarrena signed as a free agent with the Dodgers during spring training.

Spring training for the 2014 Dodgers began on February 8 when pitchers and catchers reported to Camelback Ranch in Glendale, Arizona. On the first day of camp, the team also announced that they had signed left-handed pitcher Paul Maholm to a one-year contract. Maholm would compete with Josh Beckett, who missed most of the previous season with an injury, for the fifth starter spot. On February 22, the Dodgers signed Cuban shortstop Erisbel Arruebarrena to a 5-year $25 million contract and designated infielder Justin Sellers for assignment.

Due to Major League Baseball scheduling the Dodgers to open the season with a couple of games in Sydney, Australia on March 22, the team had an abbreviated spring training. Starting pitcher Zack Greinke injured his calf in his first spring training start, and was ruled out for the opening series. Outfielder Matt Kemp, recovering from off-season ankle surgery, spent most of the spring training rehabbing and was also ruled out for the opening series. On March 9, the team announced that Clayton Kershaw and Hyun-jin Ryu would start the two games in Australia against the Arizona Diamondbacks.

The Dodgers primary position battle in spring training was for the second base job, left open by the departure of the 2013 starter Mark Ellis. Cuban defector Alex Guerrero was the favorite to land the spot at the start of camp, but concerns about his defense opened up the competition. Dee Gordon, who had primarily played shortstop in the past as well as non-roster candidates Justin Turner and Chone Figgins got time at the position during camp. At the end of camp, both Turner and Figgins had their contracts purchased and were added to the 40 man roster, while reliever Javy Guerra was designated for assignment.

The team had a record of 6–10–5 during the Cactus League schedule, which concluded on March 16, when the team left Arizona to fly to Australia.

== Standings ==
=== National League West ===
NL West
Team	W	L	Pct.	GB	Home	Road
Los Angeles Dodgers	94	68	.580	—	45‍–‍36	49‍–‍32
San Francisco Giants	88	74	.543	6	45‍–‍36	43‍–‍38
San Diego Padres	77	85	.475	17	48‍–‍33	29‍–‍52
Colorado Rockies	66	96	.407	28	45‍–‍36	21‍–‍60
Arizona Diamondbacks	64	98	.395	30	33‍–‍48	31‍–‍50

=== National League Wild Card ===
Wild Card standings

Division leaders
Team	W	L	Pct.
Washington Nationals	96	66	.593
Los Angeles Dodgers	94	68	.580
St. Louis Cardinals	90	72	.556

Wild Card teams (Top 2 teams qualify for postseason)
Team	W	L	Pct.	GB
Pittsburgh Pirates	88	74	.543	—
San Francisco Giants	88	74	.543	—
Milwaukee Brewers	82	80	.506	6
New York Mets	79	83	.488	9
Atlanta Braves	79	83	.488	9
Miami Marlins	77	85	.475	11
San Diego Padres	77	85	.475	11
Cincinnati Reds	76	86	.469	12
Philadelphia Phillies	73	89	.451	15
Chicago Cubs	73	89	.451	15
Colorado Rockies	66	96	.407	22
Arizona Diamondbacks	64	98	.395	24

=== Record vs. opponents ===
NL Records

2014 National League record Source: MLB Standings Grid – 2014
Team	AZ	ATL	CHC	CIN	COL	LAD	MIA	MIL	NYM	PHI	PIT	SD	SF	STL	WSH	AL
Arizona	–	3–3	5–2	3–4	9–10	4–15	3–4	3–4	2–4	2–4	3–4	12–7	6–13	1–5	1–6	7–13
Atlanta	3–3	–	5–1	5–2	4–3	1–6	9–10	5–2	9–10	11–8	3–4	3–4	1–5	2–4	11–8	7–13
Chicago	2–5	1–5	–	8–11	5–2	3–4	4–2	11–8	5–2	3–3	5–14	3–4	2–4	9–10	3–4	9–11
Cincinnati	4–3	2–5	11–8	–	3–4	3–4	4–3	10–9	2–4	3–3	12–7	1–5	5–2	7–12	3–3	6–14
Colorado	10–9	3–4	2–5	4–3	–	6–13	3–4	1–6	3–4	3–3	2–4	10–9	10–9	1–5	1–5	7–13
Los Angeles	15–4	6–1	4–3	4–3	13–6	–	3–3	1–5	4–2	3–4	2–5	12–7	10–9	4–3	2–4	11–9
Miami	4–3	10–9	2–4	3–4	4–3	3–3	–	3–4	8–11	9–10	2–4	3–4	3–4	4–2	6–13	13–7
Milwaukee	4–3	2–5	8–11	9–10	6–1	5–1	4–3	–	4–3	3–4	12–7	3–3	2–4	7–12	2–4	11–9
New York	4–2	10–9	2–5	4–2	4–3	2–4	11–8	3–4	–	13–6	3–4	3–3	1–6	4–3	4–15	11–9
Philadelphia	4–2	8–11	3–3	3–3	3–3	4–3	10–9	4–3	6–13	–	1–6	4–3	2–5	4–3	10–9	7–13
Pittsburgh	4–3	4–3	14–5	7–12	4–2	5–2	4–2	7–12	4–3	6–1	–	3–3	4–2	8–11	3–4	11–9
San Diego	7–12	4–3	4–3	5–1	9–10	7–12	4–3	3–3	3–3	3–4	3–3	–	10–9	3–4	3–4	9–11
San Francisco	13–6	5–1	4–2	2–5	9–10	9–10	4–3	4–2	6–1	5–2	2–4	9–10	–	4–3	2–5	10–10
St. Louis	5–1	4–2	10–9	12–7	5–1	3–4	2–4	12–7	3–4	3–4	11–8	4–3	3–4	–	5–2	8–12
Washington	6–1	8–11	4–3	3–3	5–1	4–2	13–6	4–2	15–4	9–10	4–3	4–3	5–2	2–5	–	10–10

== Regular season ==
=== Opening series ===
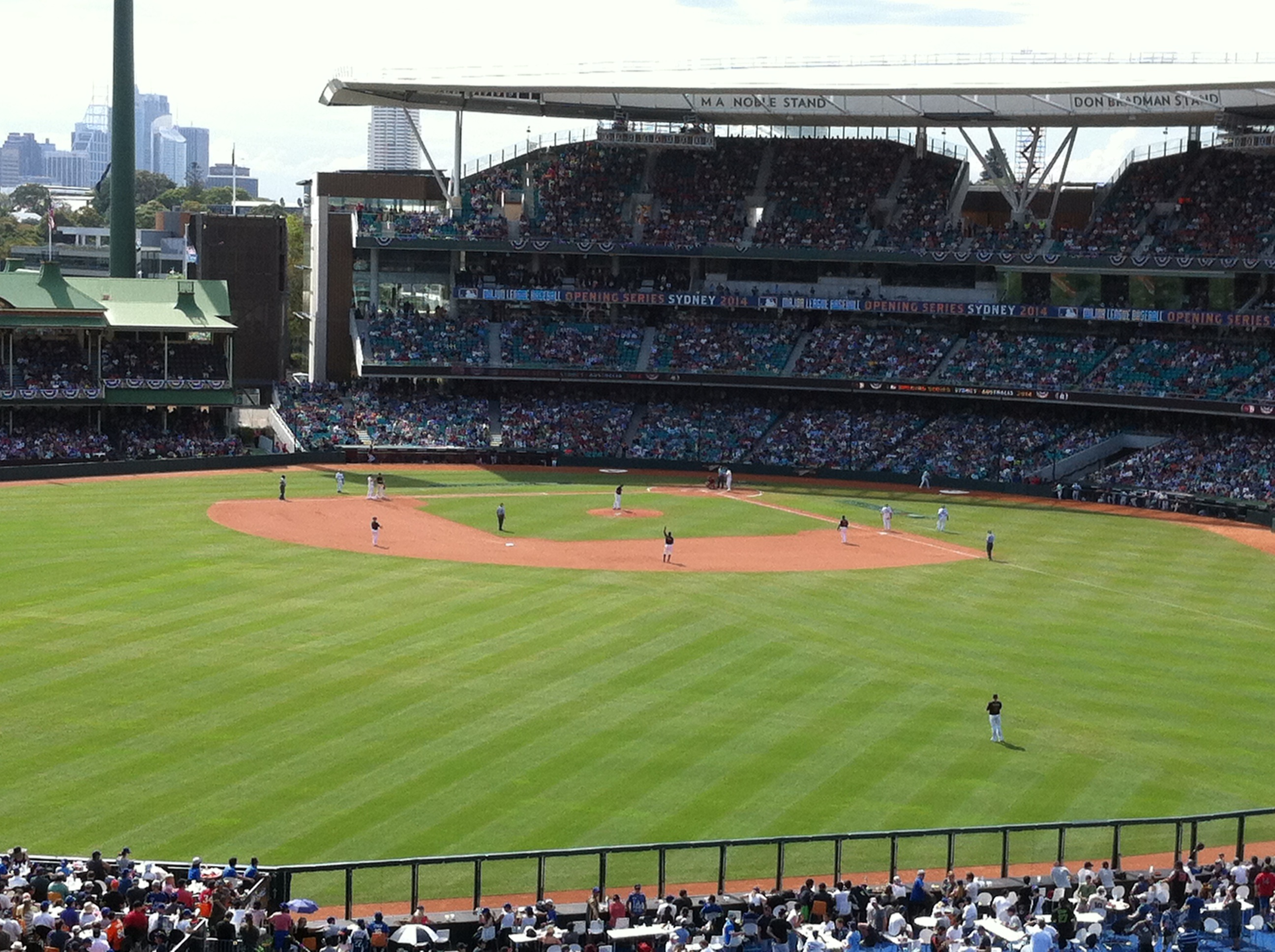
The Dodgers opened the season with a series at the Sydney Cricket Ground

This season, Major League Baseball scheduled the Dodgers and Arizona Diamondbacks to open the season with a two-game series at the Sydney Cricket Ground in Australia. As a result, both teams began spring training earlier than usual and played abbreviated Cactus League schedules before flying to Australia for the series. Several members of the Dodgers organization expressed their dislike of the way the trip would impact their normal-preseason routine and their concern over the travel. As a result, the media started portraying the Dodgers in a negative light, contrasted with the Diamondbacks seemingly supportive stance on the trip. A few days before the start of the series, the Dodgers played an exhibition game against the Australian national baseball team.

Clayton Kershaw made his fourth straight opening day start for the Dodgers, joining Don Drysdale, Don Sutton, Fernando Valenzuela and Ramón Martínez as the only Dodgers to do so. He allowed a run for the first time in 25 opening day innings, but still struck out seven in 6.2 innings for the 3–1 win. Scott Van Slyke homered and doubled to pace the offense. In the second game, Hyun-jin Ryu pitched five scoreless innings while striking out five. Yasiel Puig was 3 for 5 with an RBI double, Dee Gordon had three hits, an RBI and scored twice and Juan Uribe also had three hits and an RBI. The bullpen struggled and let the Diamondbacks get back into the game after trailing by seven runs, but the Dodgers won 7–5 to sweep the two game opening series.

Opening Day starters
Name	Position
Yasiel Puig	Right fielder
Justin Turner	Second baseman
Hanley Ramírez	Shortstop
Adrián González	First baseman
Scott Van Slyke	Left fielder
Juan Uribe	Third baseman
Andre Ethier	Center fielder
A. J. Ellis	Catcher
Clayton Kershaw	Starting pitcher

=== March/April ===
The Dodgers returned to Los Angeles to play the Freeway Series, three exhibitions against the Los Angeles Angels. During that period, they discovered that Kershaw had a sore back, which would keep him from starting the domestic opener, and sent him to the disabled list for the first time in his career. When the season resumed, on March 30, at Petco Park, Hyun-jin Ryu pitched another seven shutout innings as the Dodgers pulled ahead 1–0. However, the bullpen faltered as Brian Wilson allowed three runs in the eighth without recording an out and the team lost 3–1 to the San Diego Padres. A 2-run homer by Yasiel Puig led the Dodgers to a 3–2 win the next day as Zack Greinke picked up his first win of the season. Dan Haren made his Dodgers debut on April 3, allowing one unearned run on four hits with six strikeouts and no walks in a 5–1 win against the Padres.

The Dodgers returned to Dodger Stadium for their home opener on April 4. However, Ryu was hit hard and the San Francisco Giants jumped to an early 8–0 lead after the second inning and held on to win 8–4. A three-run homer by Pablo Sandoval and 10 strikeouts by Madison Bumgarner led the Giants to a 7–2 rout of the Dodgers the next day. Zack Greinke struck out eight in 10 innings on April 6 and the Dodgers got two-home run games from both Matt Kemp and Hanley Ramírez to beat the Giants 6–2 in the final game of the series. A walk-off double by Carl Crawford in the 10th inning gave the Dodgers a 3–2 win over the Detroit Tigers on April 8. Josh Beckett returned from the disabled list to make his first start of the season on April 8. He struggled but the Dodgers came from behind to send the game into extra innings only to lose 7–6 in 10 innings.

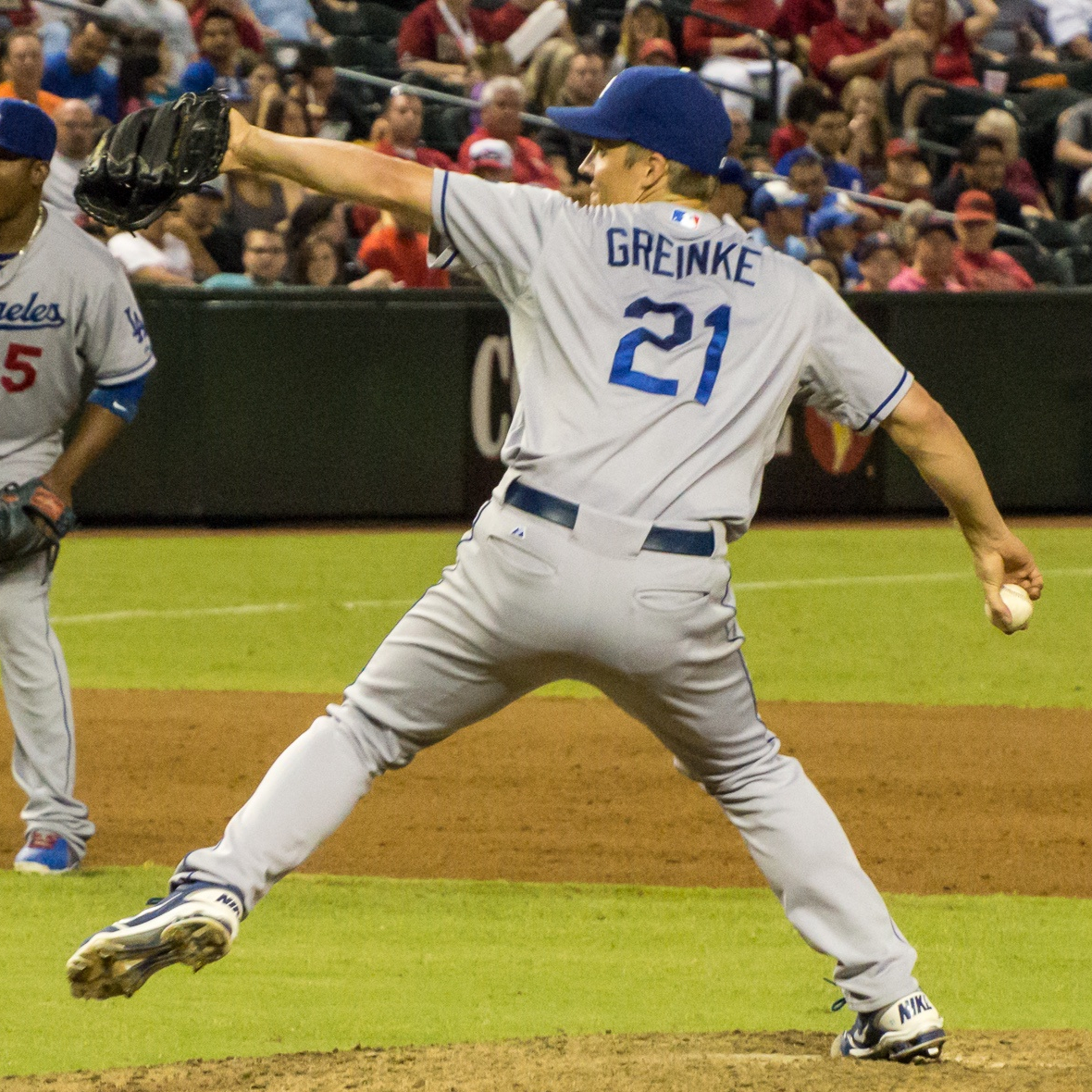
Zack Greinke was a perfect 5–0 in the month of April.

The Dodgers traveled to Chase Field to play the Diamondbacks on April 11. Adrián González was 3 for 4 with 5 RBI and a homer as the Dodgers won 6–0 in the opener of the series. Greinke picked up his third win of the season when he pitched 5 1/3 innings while allowing only one run and striking out eight the next night. González hit a two-run homer in the game. The Dodgers won 8–5, despite Brandon League allowing three runs to score in the ninth. González, Kemp and Juan Uribe all homered as the Dodgers completed the sweep of the Diamondbacks 8–6. The Dodgers next dropped the opener of a three-game series at AT&T Park to the Giants in 12 innings. The Giants also won the next game, 2–1, despite an effective start by Paul Maholm, who allowed only one run in six innings. Ryu pitched seven scoreless innings in the series finale as the Dodgers won 2–1, he became the first Dodger pitcher since Orel Hershiser in 1988 to pitch four consecutive scoreless road starts.

The Dodgers returned home on April 18 for another series with the Diamondbacks. They lost the first game of the series 4–2 in 12 innings. This was the third straight home extra innings game, matching the longest streak at Dodger Stadium (the last of which was in 1982 against the Braves). A three-run homer by Andre Ethier paced the team the next day as they won 8–6. Puig hit a 3-run homer in a 4–1 win in the series finale. Cliff Lee dominated the Dodgers 7–0 as the Philadelphia Phillies came to town next. A costly error in the 10th inning led to a 3–2 loss the next night. Greinke picked up his 4th win while striking out 11 in seven-plus innings on April 23. Puig tripled and Hanley Ramírez hit a homer and double to pace the offense in the 5–2 win over the Phillies. Brian Wilson allowed four runs in the ninth inning as the Phillies took the final game of the series, 7–3. Josh Beckett was brilliant on April 25 against the Colorado Rockies, striking out six and allowing only two runs in eight innings. However, the Dodgers dropped another extra innings contest, 5–4. Kemp and González both homered in the Dodgers 6–3 the next day. Ryu was pounded in the final game of the homestand and the Dodgers lost to the Rockies 6–1.

The Dodgers went back on the road, to cold and wet Minnesota, where the first game of the series against the Minnesota Twins on April 29 was postponed because of the poor weather, rescheduled as part of a double-header two days later. The action got back under way on April 30 at Target Field as Zack Greinke improved to 5–0 on the season and the Dodgers racked up their 10,000th win since joining the National League with a 6–4 victory.

=== May ===
Yasiel Puig and Juan Uribe had four hits each and Dan Haren picked up his fourth win of the season (with no losses) in the Dodgers 9–4 victory in game one of the doubleheader against the Twins on May 1. The Dodgers called up minor league pitcher Red Patterson to start the second game of the doubleheader. Solo homers by Scott Van Slyke and Drew Butera in the 12th inning led to a 4–3 win and a sweep of the inter-league series. The Dodgers traveled to Miami for a series against the Marlins at Marlins Park. The tired team fell behind 6–0 in the opener, staged a late rally but lost 6–3. On May 3, Dee Gordon had five hits and three steals and Carl Crawford hit a two-run homer in the 11th inning to give the Dodgers a 9–7 win. A walk-off double by Jeff Baker gave the Marlins a 5–4 win in the last game of the series. The Dodgers sat through a three-hour rain delay in the middle of their series opener against the Washington Nationals at Nationals Park only to lose 4–0 when the offense took a day off. Clayton Kershaw returned from the disabled list and pitched seven scoreless innings while striking out nine in the Dodgers 8–3 win. Dan Haren lost for the first time in the final game of the road trip, as the Dodgers offense was stymied by Stephen Strasburg and they lost 3–2.

The Dodgers returned home to drop the opener of a four-game series against the Giants, 3–1, in 10 innings as the struggling bullpen walked three batters in that inning. The losing streak hit three games in a row as Madison Bumgarner stymied their offense in another 3–1 defeat. The Dodgers won the next game in the series, 6–2 thanks to a strong effort from lead-off hitter Dee Gordon. He had two hits, scored two runs, stole three bases and had the tie-breaking RBI double in the seventh inning. The Dodgers staged a late inning comeback to send the series finale into extra innings but the bullpen faltered again and they lost 7–4. A 3-run homer by Puig carried the Dodgers to a 6–5 victory over the Marlins on May 12. Josh Beckett picked up his first win since September 30, 2012, the next day, as the Dodgers defeated the Marlins 7–1. Paul Maholm was awful the next day, giving up 10 runs on 11 hits as the team was blown out 13–3.

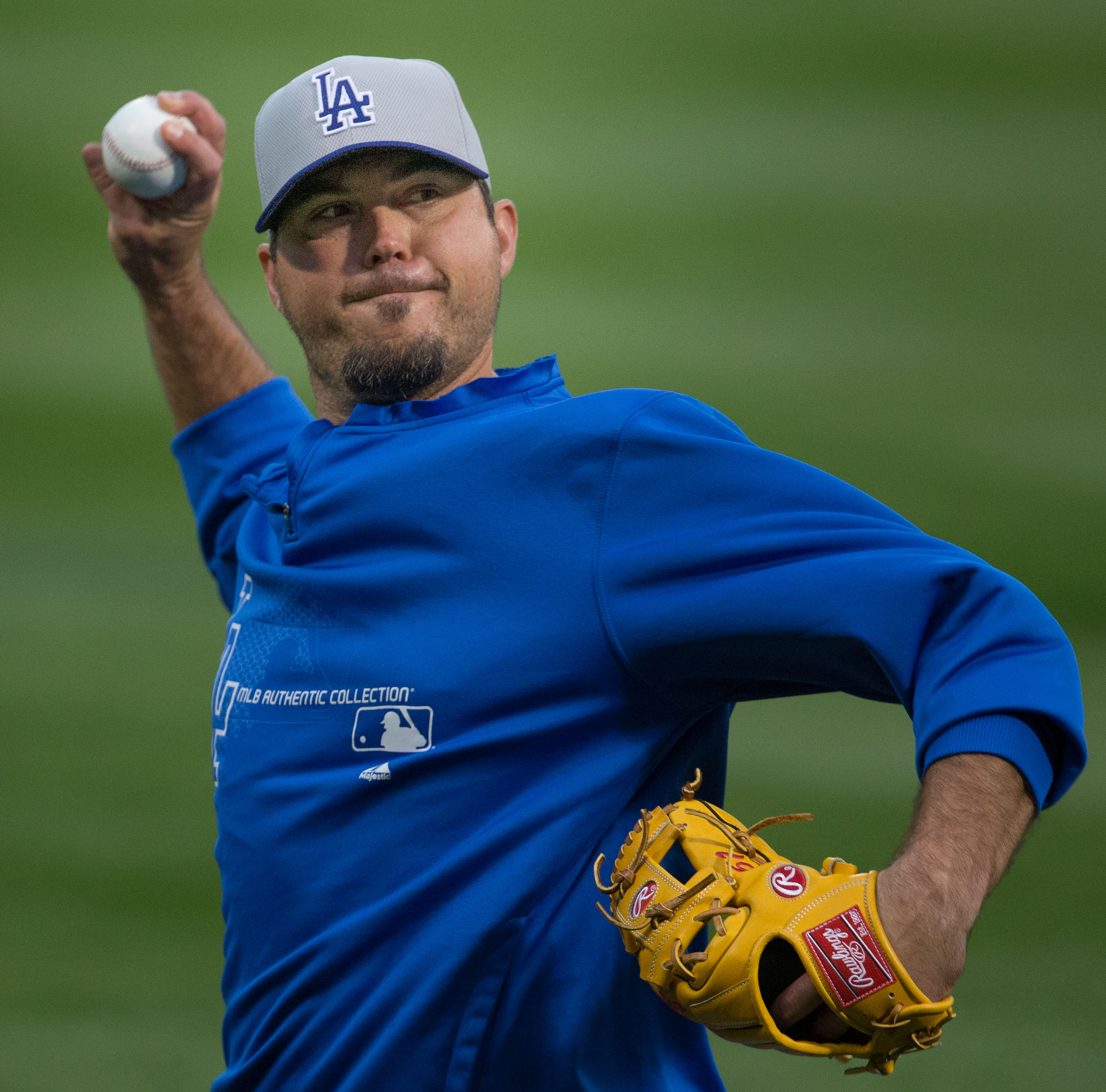
Josh Beckett pitched a no-hitter on May 25 against the Phillies

Back on the road against the Diamondbacks, Puig and Van Slyke each homered and Greinke picked up his league leading seventh run in the 7–0 win. On May 17, Kershaw had the shortest start of his career, lasting only 1 2/3 innings and allowing seven runs in what became an 18–7 loss. Poor defense contributed to a 5–3 loss in the series finale. The team next traveled to Citi Field for a series against the New York Mets. They won the opener 9–4 as Adrián González had three hits, including a tie-breaking home run. He homered again the next day, as did Puig and Hanley Ramírez as Hyun-jin Ryu came off the disabled list to beat the Mets 4–3. However they lost the series finale, 5–3. Kershaw rebounded to pitch six shutout innings, sandwiched around a 45-minute rain delay, as the Dodgers won the opener of a series from the Philadelphia Phillies, 2–0, at Citizens Bank Park. More shoddy defense led to a 5–3 defeat the next day. The Dodgers ended the road trip with a 6–0 win over the Phillies as Josh Beckett pitched his first career no hitter, and the first by a Dodger pitcher since Hideo Nomo in 1996.

The Dodgers returned home on Memorial Day and Ryu took a perfect game into the 8th inning against the Cincinnati Reds before allowing a lead-off double to Todd Frazier. The bullpen again struggled, and the Reds closed the gap before the Dodgers held on to win 4–3. Andre Ethier homered, tripled and drove in four runs in the 6–3 win over the Reds on the 27th as Grienke struck out 11 in his 7 2/3 innings. Brandon Phillips hit a two-run homer in the 1st inning and the Reds held on to defeat the Dodgers 3–2 as the series wrapped up. They lost again the next day, 6–3, to the Pittsburgh Pirates. The Dodgers were shut down by Francisco Liriano in a 2–1 loss the following day. Hanley Ramírez woke up the Dodgers offense by going 4 for 4 with 2 homers and 5 RBI as the Dodgers routed the Pirates 12–2 to finish the month of May with a 15–15 record.

=== June ===
June started off with a loss as Andrew McCutchen was 3 for 4 with two doubles and a home run in the Pirates 5–3 win over the Dodgers. Clayton Kershaw struck out nine while allowing only two runs in eight innings on June 2 against the Chicago White Sox and the Dodgers scored five unearned runs in the bottom of the sixth thanks to two White Sox errors to win 5–2. Two home runs, including a two-run blast by José Abreu, gave the White Sox a 4–1 win in the second game of the series. Two solo homers by the White Sox allowed them to beat the Dodgers, who only got two hits in the game, 2–1, as the homestand came to an end.

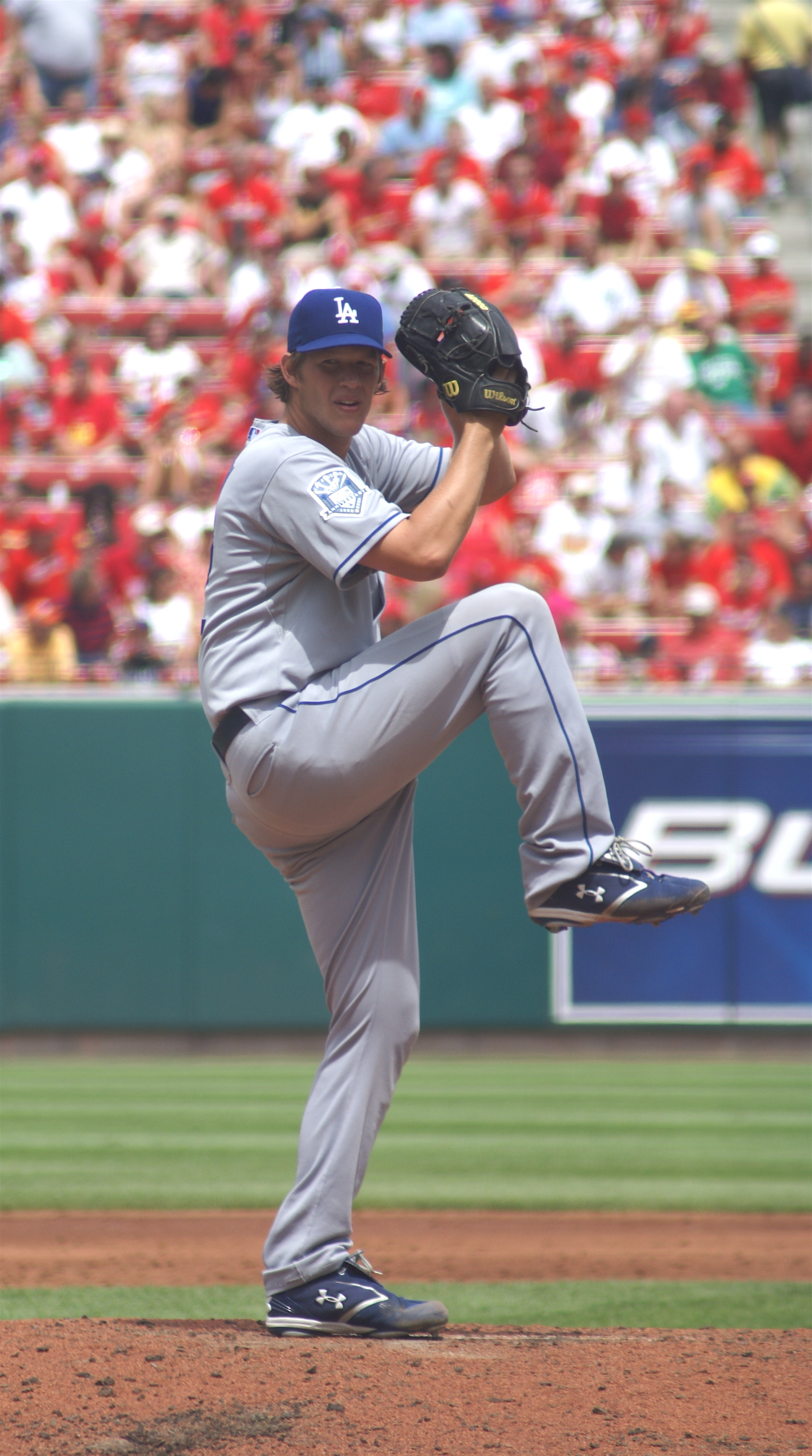
Clayton Kershaw also pitched a no-hitter, on June 18 against the Rockies, striking out 15 in the game.

Dee Gordon had three hits, including two triples, in the Dodgers 7–2 win over the Colorado Rockies at Coors Field on June 6. He was the first Dodgers player with two triples in a game since Rafael Furcal in 2010. Tim Federowicz hit a three-run homer the next day, but the Dodgers still lost 5–4 in 10 innings on a walk-off triple by Brandon Barnes. The final game of the Rockies series was called off after 5 1/2 innings because of rain but the Dodgers were credited with a 6–1 win. Clayton Kershaw struck out nine batters in the five innings, becoming the first pitcher in Major League history to record four straight games of exactly nine strikeouts. The game was the Dodgers first regulation game called before nine innings since a 2004 game that was also at Coors Field. Scott Van Slyke hit two home runs and drove in four on June 9 as the Dodgers beat the Cincinnati Reds 6–2 at Great American Ball Park. Josh Beckett threw six shutout innings and the Dodgers racked up 12 hits in a 6–1 win over the Reds after a two-hour rain delay before the second game of the series. The Dodgers struck out 12 times, managed only four hits, and were shut out 5–0 by Johnny Cueto on June 11 and wound up with a series split after dropping a day game the following day, 4–1.

The team returned home on June 13 and Kershaw allowed only one run in seven innings while striking out seven and Matt Kemp homered as they beat the Arizona Diamondbacks 4–3. A two-run homer by Dee Gordon and a three-run double by Dan Haren helped the Dodgers to a 6–4 win the next night. Sloppy defense and base running errors contributed to a 6–3 loss in the last game of the series, on Father's Day. Gordon was 4 for 4 and scored twice in the Dodgers 6–1 win over the Rockies the next night. Matt Kemp moved into sixth place on the Dodgers all time homer list on June 18, passing Raúl Mondesí with his 164th, as the team won 4–2. On June 18, Kershaw pitched a complete-game no-hitter against the Rockies and struck out a career-high 15 batters in the process. The Dodgers won 8–0. Combined with Beckett's earlier no-hitter, they were the first two Dodgers to throw no-hitters in the same season since Carl Erskine and Sal Maglie in 1956.

The Dodgers next traveled down the freeway to open a three-game series against the San Diego Padres at Petco Park. Kenley Jansen blew the save and the game by allowing three runs in the ninth inning and the Padres walked off with a 6–5 win. Beckett pitched seven shutout innings while allowing only four hits and striking out eight in the Dodgers 4–2 win in the next game. Hyun-jin Ryu only allowed one run in six innings as the Dodgers won the series finale 2–1. The Dodgers next lost the opener of an interleague series at Kauffman Stadium against the Kansas City Royals, 5–3. In his next start, Kershaw pitched eight more shutout innings while striking out eight batters in a 2–0 win. They finished off the road-trip with a 5–4 win over the Royals, where the winning road scored when A. J. Ellis was hit by a pitch with the bases loaded in the top of the eighth.

Back at Dodger Stadium, Josh Beckett engaged in a pitcher's duel with Adam Wainwright of the St. Louis Cardinals in a game that remained scoreless until a pinch hit RBI single by Justin Turner in the bottom of the eighth gave the Dodgers their one run in a 1–0 win. The Cardinals won the next night, 3–1, as the offense again sputtered. Zack Greinke picked up his 10th win of the season on June 28, when he struck out 10 in seven innings. The Dodgers offense exploded for 15 hits and nine runs as they picked up a 9–1 win. In the series finale, Kershaw struck out 13 in seven innings and extended his scoreless streak to 28 consecutive innings, the longest streak in Dodgers history since Orel Hershiser's record breaking 1988 season. The Dodgers won 6–0 to move into a share of first place with the Giants. The next night, Dan Haren allowed only one hit in seven shutout innings and Clint Robinson's first major league hit drove in the game's only run as the Dodgers beat the Cleveland Indians 1–0. After falling 9 1/2 games back at the start of the month, the Dodgers ended the month of June with a half-game lead over the Giants in the division.

=== July ===
The Dodgers started July by being blown out by the Indians 10–3. They left 10 men on base, including stranding the bases loaded three times and hitting into a triple play. Hyun-jin Ryu allowed only two runs and two hits the next day, but the bullpen allowed three runs in the top of the eighth and the Dodgers lost 5–4.

Zack Greinke allowed only two runs (one earned) in eight innings on July 3 at Coors Field and a Juan Uribe RBI single in the top of the ninth gave the Dodgers a 3–2 win over the Rockies. On the fourth of July, Clayton Kershaw allowed only two hits and no runs in eight innings while striking out eight in the team's 9–0 win. Dan Haren struck out a season high eight batters on July 5, but also allowed a season high eight runs and 10 hits. The Dodgers scored five runs in the fifth in an attempted comeback but fell one run short in an 8–7 loss. The Dodgers cruised to an 8–2 win in the series finale behind Josh Beckett's five scoreless innings. However, he walked three in the game which ended the Dodgers MLB record streak for consecutive starts with no more than two walks at 39. After the game, the Dodgers learned that they had four players selected to the 2014 Major League Baseball All-Star Game. Kershaw and Greinke were selected to the team, the fourth straight selection for Kershaw. Yasiel Puig was voted as a starter by the fan voting and Dee Gordon was selected as a reserve. Hyun-jin Ryu was unable to get out of the third inning as he allowed seven runs on ten hits and the Dodgers were pounded by the Detroit Tigers 14–5 at Comerica Park. Max Scherzer out dueled Greinke in a battle of former Cy Young Award winners and the Dodgers ended their road trip with a 4–1 loss to the Tigers.

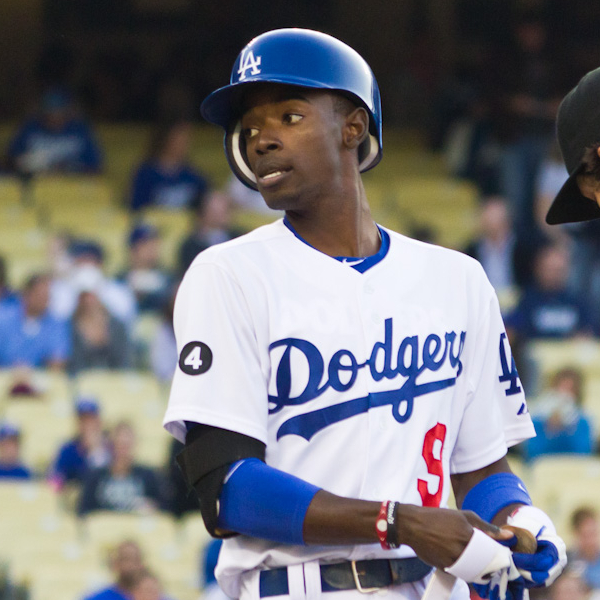
Shortstop Dee Gordon was selected to his first All-Star game

Back home, Kershaw pitched a three-hit complete game against the San Diego Padres on July 10. However, he allowed a run to score for the first time in nearly a month. He had pitched 41 consecutive scoreless innings, the third longest in Dodgers history behind Orel Hershiser and Don Drysdale. The Dodgers won 2–1. However, they lost 6–3 the next night as the bats were unable to solve rookie Jesse Hahn and Dan Haren struggled. In the following game, Paul Maholm started for the Dodgers in place of the injured Josh Beckett and pitched six scoreless innings. Ian Kennedy pitched eight scoreless for the Padres to match him. A walk-off sacrifice fly by A. J. Ellis in the ninth led to the only run of the game in the Dodgers 1–0 victory. They won the following game, also 1–0, and the Dodgers headed into the All-Star break with the top record in the National League, 54–43.

They resumed play on July 18 after the break with a 3–2 loss to the St. Louis Cardinals at Busch Stadium. The next game, Grienke gave up four runs in the first inning and the Dodgers were shut down by Joe Kelly and lost 4–2. Kershaw struck out eight in seven innings in his next start, but allowed a costly two-run homer to Peter Bourjos. However, this time the Dodgers came back and won the game on a ninth-inning single by Adrián González, 4–3. The Dodgers next traveled to Pittsburgh to open a three-game series at PNC Park. Hanley Ramírez and Yasiel Puig were both held out of most of the series against the Pirates due to injuries suffered in the Cardinals series. Still, Ryu pitched well in game one and the team won 5–2. Josh Beckett returned to the rotation after a brief stint on the disabled list but allowed four runs in only 3 2/3 innings and another bullpen implosion led to a 12–7 loss in the next game. Dan Haren lost his fourth straight start on July 23 as the Dodgers dropped the final game of the series 6–1. The Dodgers next traveled to AT&T Park for a crucial series against the San Francisco Giants. In the opener, Puig hit three triples, tying a franchise record set by Jimmy Sheckard in 1901. His 11 total bases in the game were career highs and the most by a Dodger since Kevin Elster has 12 in 2000. Zack Greinke struck out 10 in seven scoreless innings and the Dodgers cruised to an 8–1 win. Kershaw followed that up with a two-hit shutout for a 5–0 win. The Dodgers completed the sweep over the Giants with a 4–3 victory on July 27.

The team returned home on July 29 to play the Atlanta Braves. Puig had four hits in five at-bats and Matt Kemp hit two home runs in the Dodgers' 8–4 win to secure the team's first four-game winning streak of the season. The Dodgers had nine extra base hits in the game, the most since September 18, 2006. In the next game, Kemp homered again and also hit a walk-off single in the 10th inning as the Dodgers won 3–2. Greinke struck out 13 in eight innings in the game, while walking only one. Kershaw pitched a nine strikeout complete game as the Dodgers swept the Braves 2–1 to end July with a six-game winning streak.

=== August ===
Dan Haren's struggles continued as the calendar moved into August. He allowed seven runs in 4 1/3 innings as the Dodgers were blown out by the Chicago Cubs, 8–2, to snap the winning streak. Hanley Ramírez hit a walk-off homer the next day as the Dodgers won 5–2 in extra innings. Matt Kemp hit his fifth home run in six games on August 3, but poor pitching from Josh Beckett and several relief pitchers led to a 7–3 loss to the Cubs. The Los Angeles Angels of Anaheim jumped out to a quick lead in the first inning and Garrett Richards pitched a complete-game shutout in their 5–0 win over the Dodgers in the opener of the next series. Juan Uribe hit a three-run homer the next night and the Dodgers won on a walk-off grounder by Andre Ethier for a 5–4 win.

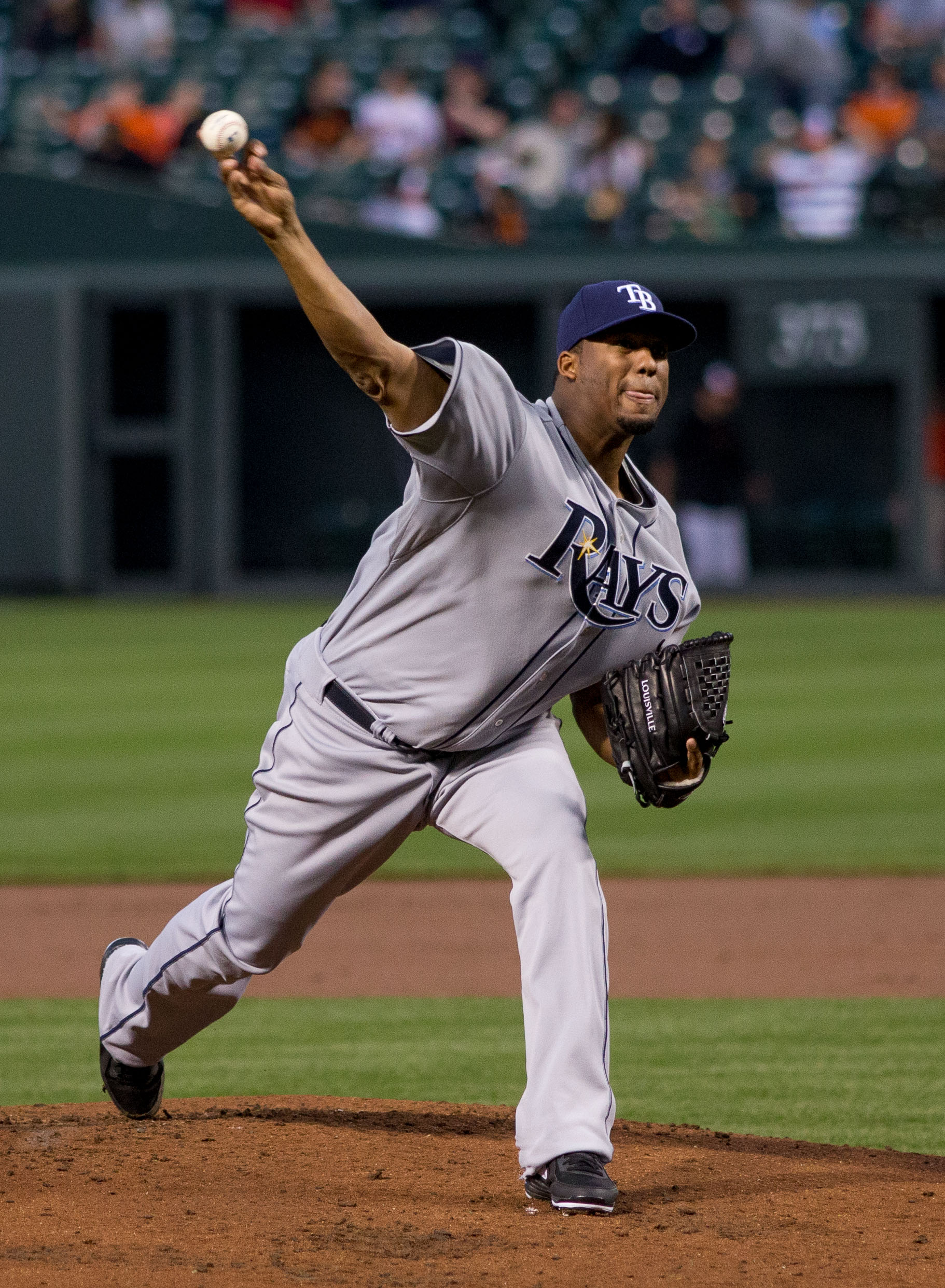
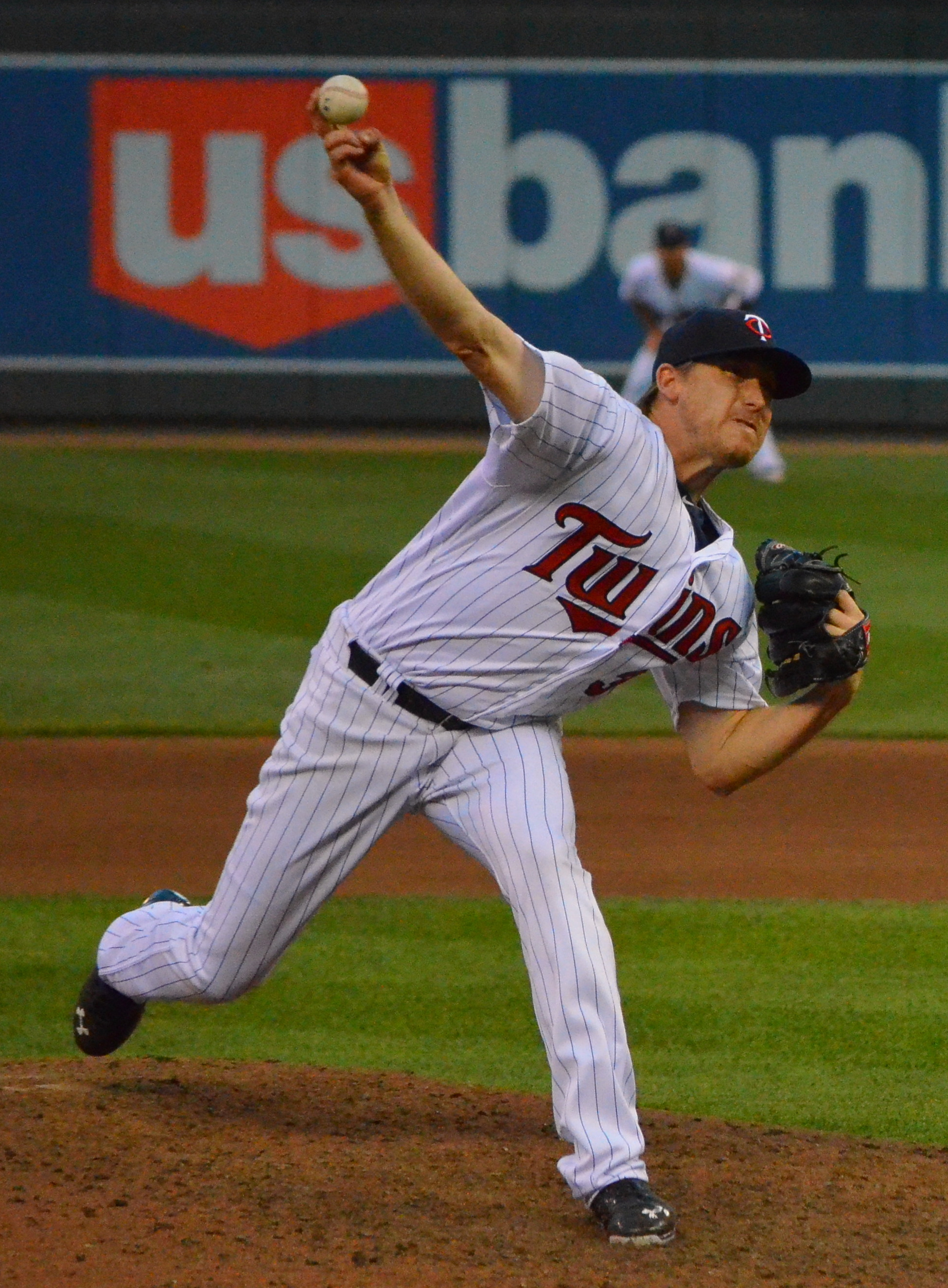
In an attempt to bolster the pitching staff, the Dodgers traded for Roberto Hernández and Kevin Correia in August.

The series switched to Angel Stadium of Anaheim the following day and after five terrible starts that had fans calling for his head, Dan Haren picked up his first win in over a month, as the Dodgers won 2–1. He allowed only three hits in 7 1/3 innings. The Dodgers finished off the interleague series when Hyun-jin Ryu combined with two relievers on a two hit shutout as they won 7–0. After struggling in his last few starts, an MRI revealed that Josh Beckett had aggravated his injured hip and he returned to the disabled list. The Dodgers traded for Roberto Hernández, who started the opener of a series against the Milwaukee Brewers at Miller Park on August 8. He was solid, allowing only two runs over six innings, but a defensive meltdown in the seventh led to a disappointing 9–3 loss. Zack Greinke allowed four runs in six innings the next day and the Dodgers lost 4–1. Clayton Kershaw allowed only one run in eight innings as the Dodgers avoided the sweep with a 5–1 win. He upped his personal win streak to 11 games, the longest win streak by a Dodger starter since Orel Hershiser in 1985. Another recent trade acquisition, Kevin Correia started for the Dodgers at Turner Field against the Atlanta Braves on August 11. He allowed only one run in six innings while the Dodgers offense came up with enough runs in a 6–2 win. Another good performance by Dan Haren led to a 4–2 win the next day. The Braves took the next game in the series, 3–2, after the Dodgers hit into a game-ending double play with the bases loaded in the ninth. Dee Gordon scored four runs and stole two bases as the Dodgers won the series with a 6–4 victory on August 14.

The Dodgers returned home for another series against the Brewers. A bullpen meltdown led to a 6–3 loss in the first game, with the Brewers scoring five of the runs in the eighth inning. In the next game, Kershaw pitched a complete game, striking out ten and allowing only five hits.. however two of the hits were homers and the team lost 3–2. It was Kershaw's first loss in 14 starts. Dan Haren lasted just three innings as the Brewers finished off a three-game series sweep of the Dodgers with a 7–2 rout in the series finale. Carl Crawford had three hits in three at-bats with a home run and a stolen base as the Dodgers ended their three-game losing streak with an 8–6 win over the San Diego Padres on August 19. Three Dodgers errors contributed to a 4–1 defeat the next day, but they won the final game of the series 2–1. Kershaw allowed only one run and three hits in eight innings while striking out 10 and a 2-run homer by Justin Turner in the 8th inning gave the Dodgers their first win of the season while trailing after the seventh inning. Haren bounced back, allowing only one run in seven innings as the Dodgers beat the New York Mets 6–2 on August 22. Adrián González hit a three-run homer and had a season high five RBI in the Dodgers 7–4 win the following day. Kevin Correia unraveled in the third inning and allowed five runs thanks to two homers. The Dodgers were blown out 11–3 in the game.

A couple of replay challenges helped the Dodgers put up six runs in the fourth inning as they beat the Arizona Diamondbacks 9–5 at Chase Field on August 26. Kershaw picked up his 16th win of the season the following day, and Kenley Jansen recorded his 100th career save as the Dodgers won 3–1 to sweep the brief two game series. The team then dropped the opening of a series against the Padres at Petco Park, 3–2 in 12 innings. In the second game, the team squandered a strong start by Zack Greinke and lost again in extra innings, on a walk-off hit by Alexi Amarista in the 10th inning. Hyun-jin Ryu came off the disabled list on August 31 and pitched seven strong innings and Adrián González had four hits as the Dodgers avoided the sweep with a 7–2 win.

=== September ===
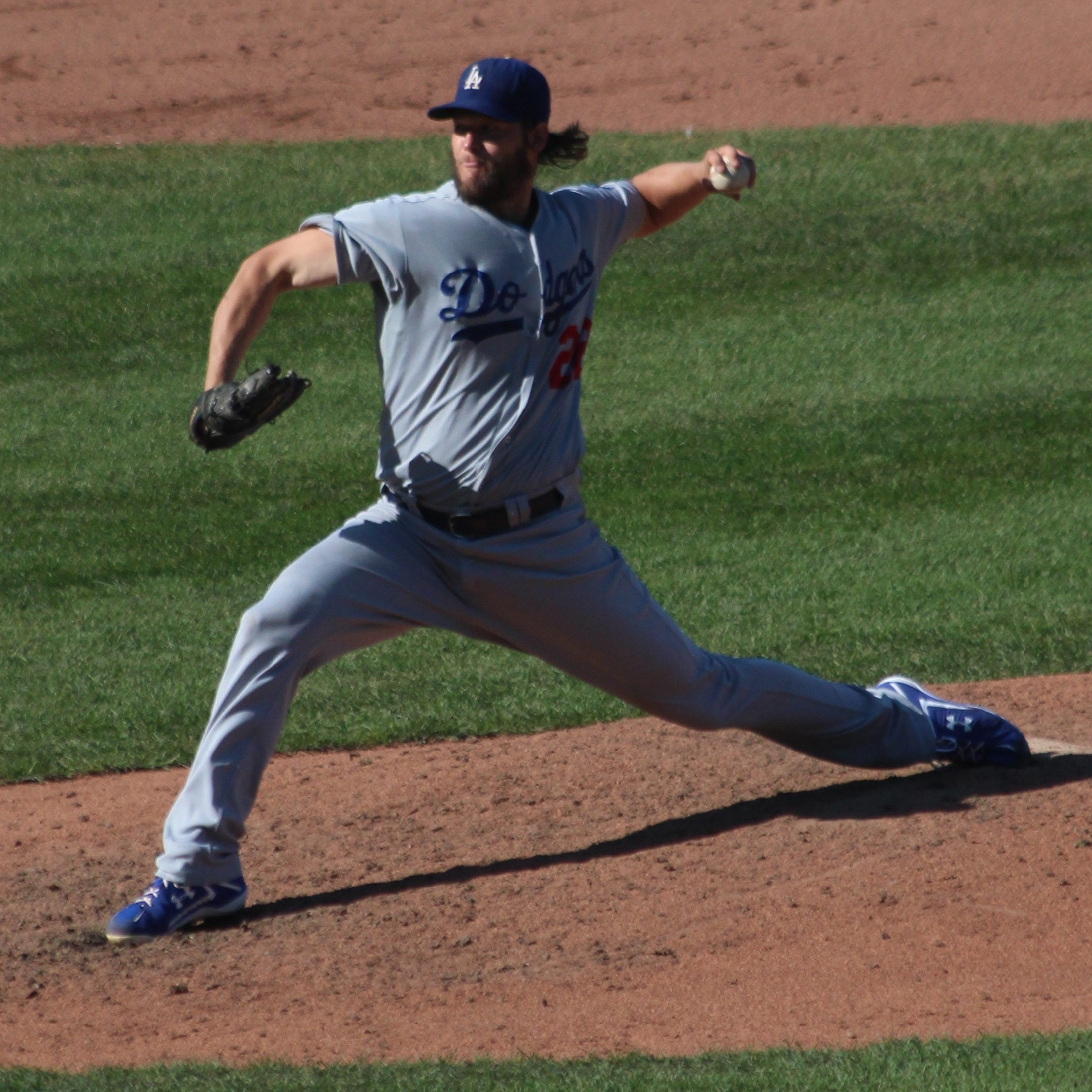
Kershaw during his 20th victory in 2014

The Dodgers began the month of September by hosting the Washington Nationals for a three-game series in a matchup of the teams with the top two records in the National League. In the first game, the Nationals hit four home runs off of Roberto Hernández, including two by Denard Span and they beat the Dodgers 6–4. Clayton Kershaw struck out eight batters the next night in eight innings, while allowing only a solo home run by Bryce Harper as the Dodgers won 4–1. In the process, Kershaw moved past the 200 strikeout mark for the fifth straight season, joining Sandy Koufax as the only Dodger pitchers to accomplish that, and just the fourth pitcher since 1893 to have at least five 200-strikeout seasons through an age-26 season (Bert Blyleven, Walter Johnson and Sam McDowell are the others). Kenley Jansen allowed three runs in the ninth to blow his save opportunity and the Nationals came back to defeat the Dodgers 8–5 in a 14-inning marathon. This was the Dodgers longest game of the year. After a much needed day off, they returned to action on September 5 with a 2–1 victory over the Diamondbacks. Dan Haren allowed one run on four hits in six innings and Matt Kemp homered in the win. Three hits and a key RBI single by Dee Gordon and a 2-RBI double by Hanley Ramírez helped the Dodgers win the next game, 5–2. Adrián González homered twice and drove in six runs as the Dodgers completed the sweep of the Diamondbacks with a 7–2 win on September 7. Kershaw picked up his 18th win when he allowed only one earned run in eight innings as the Dodgers beat the San Diego Padres 9–4. The Dodgers four-game winning streak was snapped as Hanley Ramírez committed a couple of errors in the second inning and Roberto Hernández only lasted three innings as they lost the game 6–3. The Dodgers finished off the home stand with a 4–0 shutout of the Padres. Carl Crawford had four hits in four at-bats in the game with three doubles. That tied the Dodgers record for most doubles in a game, a mark last accomplished by Matt Kemp in 2011. Dan Haren pitched seven scoreless innings to pick up his 13th win and this was the first time the Dodgers had four starters with 13 or more wins since 1985 when Orel Hershiser, Fernando Valenzuela, Jerry Reuss and Bob Welch reached that mark.

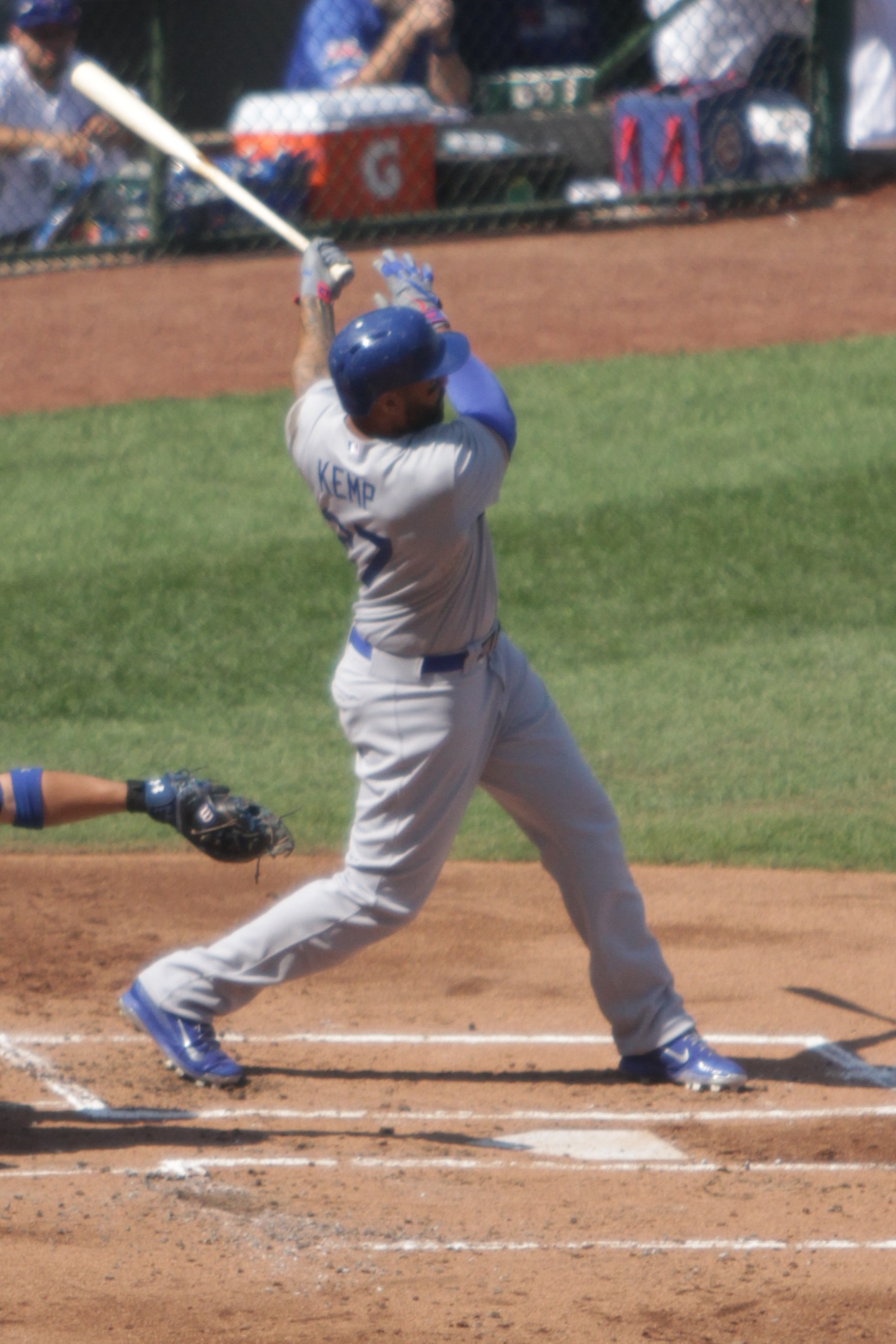
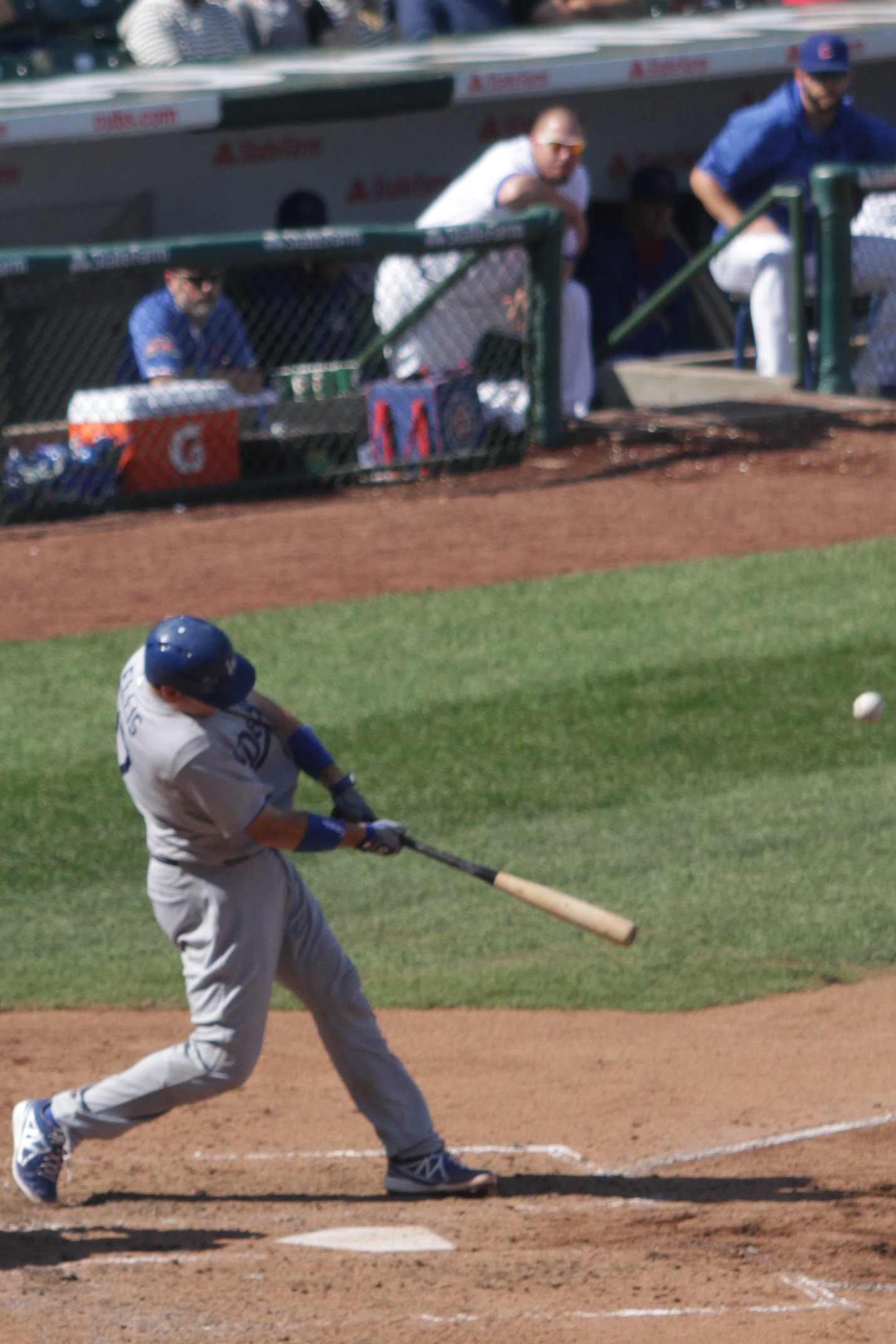
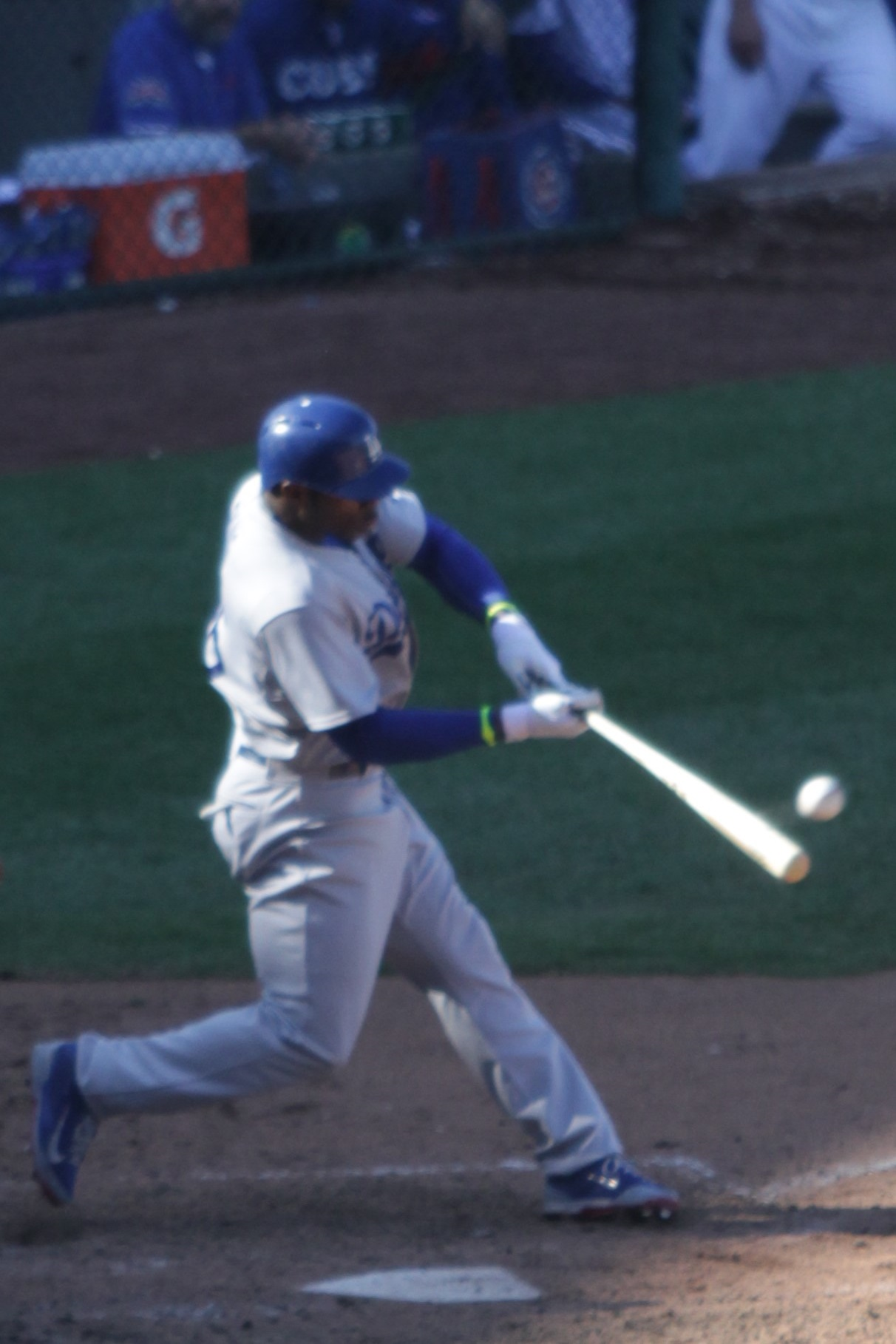
(left to right) Matt Kemp, A. J. Ellis (twice) and Yasiel Puig all homered in support of Clayton Kershaw's 20th victory. Swing of the home run pitch shown (Ellis' 2nd shown).

The Dodgers, holding a two-game lead in the division, traveled up the coast to begin a key three game series against the team trailing them in the standings, the San Francisco Giants, at AT&T Park. Hyun-jin Ryu was tagged for four runs in the first before leaving the game with shoulder irritation in a contest the Dodgers lost 9–0. Hanley Ramírez did hit a double in the game which gave the Dodgers four players with at least 30 doubles (González, Kemp and Puig were the others) for the first time since 2003 (Shawn Green, Paul Lo Duca, Jolbert Cabrera and Adrián Beltré). The Dodgers came back the next night and got even. They scored four runs in the first to knock Tim Hudson out of the game and cruised to a 17–0 victory. Zack Greinke allowed only four hits in six scoreless innings and also hit a double and a two-run homer. The game was the Dodgers most lopsided victory and most one-sided shutout against the Giants since the teams moved to the West Coast in 1958. The Dodgers had the most hits (24) by any team in AT&T Park history and the most hits by an opponent against the Giants since 1932. Dee Gordon also picked up his 60th stolen base in the game, the first Dodger to reach that mark since Juan Pierre in 2007. The two opposing shutouts equalled the largest consecutive shutout run differential since a game between the Chicago White Stockings and the Washington Nationals on May 27–28, 1886. Kershaw picked up his 19th win the following day, pitching eight innings while allowing two runs and striking out nine. He became the first Dodger starter to last at least eight innings in seven straight starts since Orel Hershiser in 1988. Matt Kemp hit a two-run home run in the 4–2 win, the 177th of his career, tying Mike Piazza for fourth on the all-time L.A. Dodger list. They next traveled to Coors Field and blew out the Rockies 11–3. The following night, the Dodgers outhit the Rockies 16–9 but were unable to bring many runs in and lost 10–4 as they stranded 10 runners on base. In the final game of the series, Carlos Frías became the first pitcher in the modern era to allow 10 hits without getting at least three outs. The Dodgers were pounded 16–2. The Dodgers fell behind the Chicago Cubs in the next game, at Wrigley Field, but used a five-run seventh inning to come back and win the game 8–4. The Dodgers scored six times in the first inning of the next game and A. J. Ellis his two home runs en route to a 14–5 victory over the Cubs. Kershaw picked up his 20th win of the season, joining Sandy Koufax, Don Drysdale and Claude Osteen as the only L.A. Dodger pitchers to have multiple 20 win seasons. Kershaw also joined Pedro Martínez as the only pitchers to win 20 games in less than 30 starts. The Dodgers clinched a playoff berth later that night when the Pittsburgh Pirates beat the Milwaukee Brewers. Adrián González hit two home runs with five RBI in the September 20 game against the Cubs to pull out to a 6–2 lead but the bullpen faltered and the Cubs, led by two homers by Chris Coghlan came back to win 8–7. Matt Kemp homered with four hits and four RBI as the Dodgers finished up their last road trip of the regular season with an 8–5 victory over the Cubs.

The Dodgers returned home on September 22 with a 4 1/2-game lead in the division to begin their final homestand of the season against the second place Giants before a crowd of 53,500, the largest in the Majors in 2014. Dan Haren allowed only one hit (a leadoff home run by Gregor Blanco) in his seven innings of work but the Dodgers defense coughed up three errors and the team failed to get a hit after the sixth inning. The Giants eventually won 5–2 in 13 innings. In the following game, Grienke pitched eight innings and Justin Turner hit two home runs as the Dodgers won 4–2 to cut their magic number to one. Clayton Kershaw struck out 11 while only allowing one run in eight innings and the Dodgers jumped on the Giants and won 9–1 on September 24 to clinch their second straight National League West division championship and home field advantage in the Divisional Round of the playoffs. With the team resting several regulars the next game, Scott Elbert picked up his first win in two years and the Dodgers beat the Rockies 7–4. Scott Van Slyke had two hits, two steals and scored the winning run on a wild pitch in the 12th inning as the Dodgers beat the Rockies 6–5 in the second to last game of the regular season. Juan Uribe managed the team in the season finale and they hit three home runs to finish off the Rockies 10–5. The Dodgers finished the regular season with a record of 94–68.

=== Game log ===
2014 game log
March / April (15–12)

#	Date	Opponent	Score	Win	Loss	Save	Stadium	Attendance	Record
1	March 22	@ Diamondbacks	**W** 3–1	**Kershaw** (1–0)	Miley (0–1)	**Jansen** (1)	Sydney Cricket Ground	38,266	1–0
2	March 22	@ Diamondbacks	**W** 7–5	**Ryu** (1–0)	Cahill (0–1)		Sydney Cricket Ground	38,079	2–0
3	March 30	@ Padres	L 1–3	Thayer (1–0)	**Wilson** (0–1)	Street (1)	Petco Park	45,567	2–1
4	April 1	@ Padres	**W** 3–2	**Greinke** (1–0)	Kennedy (0–1)	**Jansen** (2)	Petco Park	35,033	3–1
5	April 2	@ Padres	**W** 5–1	**Haren** (1–0)	Ross (0–1)		Petco Park	27,498	4–1
6	April 4	Giants	L 4–8	Huff (1–0)	**Ryu** (1–1)		Dodger Stadium	53,493	4–2
7	April 5	Giants	L 2–7	Bumgarner (1–0)	**Maholm** (0–1)		Dodger Stadium	49,520	4–3
8	April 6	Giants	**W** 6–2	**Greinke** (2–0)	Cain (0–1)		Dodger Stadium	48,367	5–3
9	April 8	Tigers	**W** 3–2 (10)	**Howell** (1–0)	Chamberlain (0–1)		Dodger Stadium	53,231	6–3
10	April 9	Tigers	L 6–7 (10)	Nathan (2–0)	**Jansen** (0–1)		Dodger Stadium	42,687	6–4
11	April 11	@ Diamondbacks	**W** 6–0	**Ryu** (2–1)	McCarthy (0–2)		Chase Field	33,349	7–4
12	April 12	@ Diamondbacks	**W** 8–5	**Greinke** (3–0)	Miley (2–2)	**Jansen** (3)	Chase Field	38,374	8–4
13	April 13	@ Diamondbacks	**W** 8–6	**Haren** (2–0)	Cahill (0–4)	**Jansen** (4)	Chase Field	31,757	9–4
14	April 15	@ Giants	L 2–3 (12)	Petit (1–1)	**League** (0–1)		AT&T Park	42,469	9–5
15	April 16	@ Giants	L 1–2	Machi (3–0)	**Howell** (1–1)	Romo (4)	AT&T Park	42,773	9–6
16	April 17	@ Giants	**W** 2–1	**Ryu** (3–1)	Bumgarner (2–1)	**Jansen** (5)	AT&T Park	42,890	10–6
17	April 18	Diamondbacks	L 2–4 (12)	Thatcher (1–0)	**Chris Perez** (0–1)	Cahill (1)	Dodger Stadium	47,680	10–7
18	April 19	Diamondbacks	**W** 8–6	**Haren** (3–0)	Bolsinger (0–1)	**Jansen** (6)	Dodger Stadium	48,541	11–7
19	April 20	Diamondbacks	**W** 4–1	**Wright** (1–0)	Collmenter (0–2)	**Jansen** (7)	Dodger Stadium	37,447	12–7
20	April 21	Phillies	L 0–7	Lee (3–2)	**Maholm** (0–2)		Dodger Stadium	37,715	12–8
21	April 22	Phillies	L 2–3 (10)	Bastardo (3–1)	**Howell** (1–2)	Papelbon (6)	Dodger Stadium	48,826	12–9
22	April 23	Phillies	**W** 5–2	**Greinke** (4–0)	Hamels (0–1)	**Jansen** (8)	Dodger Stadium	40,776	13–9
23	April 24	Phillies	L 3–7	Adams (1–0)	**Wilson** (0–2)		Dodger Stadium	51,699	13–10
24	April 25	Rockies	L 4–5 (11)	Brothers (2–2)	**Wright** (1–1)	Hawkins (7)	Dodger Stadium	44,866	13–11
25	April 26	Rockies	**W** 6–3	**Maholm** (1–2)	Nicasio (2–1)	**Jansen** (9)	Dodger Stadium	45,241	14–11
26	April 27	Rockies	L 1–6	de la Rosa (2–3)	**Ryu** (3–2)		Dodger Stadium	52,359	14–12
—	April 29	@ Twins	**Postponed (inclement weather)** (Makeup date: May 1)						
27	April 30	@ Twins	**W** 6–4	**Greinke** (5–0)	Gibson (3–2)	**Jansen** (10)	Target Field	24,588	15–12

May (15–15)

#	Date	Opponent	Score	Win	Loss	Save	Stadium	Attendance	Record
28	May 1	@ Twins	**W** 9–4	**Haren** (4–0)	Pelfrey (0–3)	**Perez** (1)	Target Field	23,306	16–12
29	May 1	@ Twins	**W** 4–3 (12)	**Wright** (2–1)	Duensing (0–1)	**Jansen** (11)	Target Field	24,053	17–12
30	May 2	@ Marlins	L 3–6	Koehler (3–2)	**Beckett** (0–1)		Marlins Park	20,722	17–13
31	May 3	@ Marlins	**W** 9–7 (11)	**League** (1–1)	Mármol (0–2)		Marlins Park	24,104	18–13
32	May 4	@ Marlins	L 4–5	Ramos (2–0)	**Wright** (2–2)		Marlins Park	30,145	18–14
33	May 5	@ Nationals	L 0–4	Barrett (1–0)	**Greinke** (5–1)		Nationals Park	24,447	18–15
34	May 6	@ Nationals	**W** 8–3	**Kershaw** (2–0)	Treinen (0–1)		Nationals Park	30,143	19–15
35	May 7	@ Nationals	L 2–3	Strasburg (3–2)	**Haren** (4–1)	Soriano (7)	Nationals Park	34,756	19–16
36	May 8	Giants	L 1–3 (10)	Casilla (1–0)	**Howell** (1–3)	Romo (11)	Dodger Stadium	43,068	19–17
37	May 9	Giants	L 1–3	Bumgarner (4–3)	**Maholm** (1–3)	Romo (12)	Dodger Stadium	49,171	19–18
38	May 10	Giants	**W** 6–2	**Greinke** (6–1)	Affeldt (0–1)		Dodger Stadium	47,199	20–18
39	May 11	Giants	L 4–7 (10)	Romo (3–0)	**Jansen** (0–2)	Machi (1)	Dodger Stadium	51,369	20–19
40	May 12	Marlins	**W** 6–5	**Haren** (5–1)	Koehler (3–3)	**Jansen** (12)	Dodger Stadium	37,187	21–19
41	May 13	Marlins	**W** 7–1	**Beckett** (1–1)	Turner (0–1)		Dodger Stadium	50,349	22–19
42	May 14	Marlins	L 3–13	DeSclafani (1–0)	**Maholm** (1–4)	Wolf (1)	Dodger Stadium	39,498	22–20
43	May 16	@ Diamondbacks	**W** 7–0	**Greinke** (7–1)	Miley (3–4)		Chase Field	31,154	23–20
44	May 17	@ Diamondbacks	L 7–18	Anderson (2–0)	**Kershaw** (2–1)		Chase Field	36,688	23–21
45	May 18	@ Diamondbacks	L 3–5	Collmenter (2–2)	**Haren** (5–2)	Reed (12)	Chase Field	35,406	23–22
46	May 20	@ Mets	**W** 9–4	**Beckett** (2–1)	Montero (0–2)		Citi Field	22,288	24–22
47	May 21	@ Mets	**W** 4–3	**Ryu** (4–2)	DeGrom (0–2)	**Jansen** (13)	Citi Field	23,721	25–22
48	May 22	@ Mets	L 3–5	Niese (3–3)	**Perez** (0–2)	Mejía (2)	Citi Field	23,416	25–23
49	May 23	@ Phillies	**W** 2–0	**Kershaw** (3–1)	Hernández (2–2)	**Jansen** (14)	Citizens Bank Park	27,254	26–23
50	May 24	@ Phillies	L 3–5	Buchanan (1–0)	**Haren** (5–3)	Papelbon (13)	Citizens Bank Park	32,287	26–24
51	May 25	@ Phillies	**W** 6–0	**Beckett** (3–1)	Burnett (3–4)		Citizens Bank Park	36,141	27–24
52	May 26	Reds	**W** 4–3	**Ryu** (5–2)	Cueto (4–4)	**Jansen** (15)	Dodger Stadium	45,505	28–24
53	May 27	Reds	**W** 6–3	**Greinke** (8–1)	Simón (6–3)	**Jansen** (16)	Dodger Stadium	46,013	29–24
54	May 28	Reds	L 2–3	Bailey (5–3)	**Kershaw** (3–2)	Chapman (5)	Dodger Stadium	41,129	29–25
55	May 29	Pirates	L 3–6	Cole (5–3)	**League** (1–2)	Grilli (6)	Dodger Stadium	39,643	29–26
56	May 30	Pirates	L 1–2	Liriano (1–5)	**Beckett** (3–2)	Grilli (7)	Dodger Stadium	47,503	29–27
57	May 31	Pirates	**W** 12–2	**Ryu** (6–2)	Cumpton (0–2)	**Wright** (1)	Dodger Stadium	49,455	30–27

June (18–10)

#	Date	Opponent	Score	Win	Loss	Save	Stadium	Attendance	Record
58	June 1	Pirates	L 3–5	Vólquez (3–4)	**Greinke** (8–2)	Grilli (8)	Dodger Stadium	51,020	30–28
59	June 2	White Sox	**W** 5–2	**Kershaw** (4–2)	Quintana (3–5)	**Jansen** (17)	Dodger Stadium	37,336	31–28
60	June 3	White Sox	L 1–4	Noesí (1–4)	**Haren** (5–4)	Belisario (4)	Dodger Stadium	44,477	31–29
61	June 4	White Sox	L 1–2	Danks (4–5)	**Beckett** (3–3)	Belisario (5)	Dodger Stadium	45,540	31–30
62	June 6	@ Rockies	**W** 7–2	**Ryu** (7–2)	Butler (0–1)		Coors Field	39,203	32–30
63	June 7	@ Rockies	L 4–5 (10)	Morales (4–4)	**Perez** (0–3)		Coors Field	40,474	32–31
64	June 8	@ Rockies	**W** 6–1 (5 1/2)	**Kershaw** (5–2)	de la Rosa (6–5)		Coors Field	38,111	33–31
65	June 9	@ Reds	**W** 6–2	**Haren** (6–4)	Cingrani (2–7)		Great American Ball Park	31,915	34–31
66	June 10	@ Reds	**W** 6–1	**Beckett** (4–3)	Leake (3–6)		Great American Ball Park	27,692	35–31
67	June 11	@ Reds	L 0–5	Cueto (6–5)	**Ryu** (7–3)		Great American Ball Park	27,014	35–32
68	June 12	@ Reds	L 1–4	Simón (9–3)	**Greinke** (8–3)	Chapman (10)	Great American Ball Park	33,557	35–33
69	June 13	Diamondbacks	**W** 4–3	**Kershaw** (6–2)	Anderson (5–1)	**Jansen** (18)	Dodger Stadium	42,831	36–33
70	June 14	Diamondbacks	**W** 6–4	**Haren** (7–4)	Collmenter (4–4)	**Jansen** (19)	Dodger Stadium	51,422	37–33
71	June 15	Diamondbacks	L 3–6	Arroyo (7–4)	**Beckett** (4–4)		Dodger Stadium	52,519	37–34
72	June 16	Rockies	**W** 6–1	**Ryu** (8–3)	Matzek (1–1)		Dodger Stadium	44,077	38–34
73	June 17	Rockies	**W** 4–2	**Greinke** (9–3)	Chacín (1–5)	**Jansen** (20)	Dodger Stadium	44,174	39–34
74	June 18	Rockies	**W** 8–0	**Kershaw** (7–2)	de la Rosa (6–6)		Dodger Stadium	46,069	40–34
75	June 20	@ Padres	L 5–6	Thayer (3–2)	**Jansen** (0–3)		Petco Park	31,119	40–35
76	June 21	@ Padres	**W** 4–2	**Beckett** (5–4)	Ross (6–7)	**Jansen** (21)	Petco Park	43,474	41–35
77	June 22	@ Padres	**W** 2–1	**Ryu** (9–3)	Stults (2–10)	**Jansen** (22)	Petco Park	32,406	42–35
78	June 23	@ Royals	L 3–5	Guthrie (5–6)	**Greinke** (9–4)	Holland (22)	Kauffman Stadium	21,615	42–36
79	June 24	@ Royals	**W** 2–0	**Kershaw** (8–2)	Duffy (4–7)	**Jansen** (23)	Kauffman Stadium	28,302	43–36
80	June 25	@ Royals	**W** 5–4	**Wright** (3–2)	Davis (5–2)	**Wilson** (1)	Kauffman Stadium	19,776	44–36
81	June 26	Cardinals	**W** 1–0	**Wilson** (1–2)	Wainwright (10–4)	**Jansen** (24)	Dodger Stadium	48,624	45–36
82	June 27	Cardinals	L 1–3	Maness (3–2)	**Ryu** (9–4)	Rosenthal (24)	Dodger Stadium	48,159	45–37
83	June 28	Cardinals	**W** 9–1	**Greinke** (10–4)	Lynn (8–6)		Dodger Stadium	50,910	46–37
84	June 29	Cardinals	**W** 6–0	**Kershaw** (9–2)	Miller (7–7)		Dodger Stadium	47,739	47–37
85	June 30	Indians	**W** 1–0	**Haren** (8–4)	Kluber (7–6)	**Jansen** (25)	Dodger Stadium	45,627	48–37

July (14–10)

#	Date	Opponent	Score	Win	Loss	Save	Stadium	Attendance	Record
86	July 1	Indians	L 3–10	Crockett (2–0)	**Beckett** (5–5)		Dodger Stadium	46,300	48–38
87	July 2	Indians	L 4–5	Shaw (3–1)	**Wilson** (1–3)	Allen (8)	Dodger Stadium	50,199	48–39
88	July 3	@ Rockies	**W** 3–2	**Greinke** (11–4)	Hawkins (2–2)	**Jansen** (26)	Coors Field	48,533	49–39
89	July 4	@ Rockies	**W** 9–0	**Kershaw** (10–2)	Jurrjens (0–1)		Coors Field	48,815	50–39
90	July 5	@ Rockies	L 7–8	de la Rosa (9–6)	**Haren** (8–5)	Hawkins (15)	Coors Field	32,926	50–40
91	July 6	@ Rockies	**W** 8–2	**Beckett** (6–5)	Flande (0–2)		Coors Field	33,924	51–40
92	July 8	@ Tigers	L 5–14	Verlander (8–7)	**Ryu** (9–5)		Comerica Park	36,912	51–41
93	July 9	@ Tigers	L 1–4	Scherzer (11–3)	**Greinke** (11–5)	Nathan (18)	Comerica Park	36,462	51–42
94	July 10	Padres	**W** 2–1	**Kershaw** (11–2)	Despaigne (2–1)		Dodger Stadium	50,332	52–42
95	July 11	Padres	L 3–6	Hahn (5–2)	**Haren** (8–6)	Street (24)	Dodger Stadium	46,073	52–43
96	July 12	Padres	**W** 1–0	**Jansen** (1–3)	Quackenbush (1–2)		Dodger Stadium	51,749	53–43
97	July 13	Padres	**W** 1–0	**Ryu** (10–5)	Ross (7–10)	**Jansen** (27)	Dodger Stadium	47,131	54–43
**All-Star Break**
98	July 18	@ Cardinals	L 2–3	Lynn (11–6)	**Haren** (8–7)	Rosenthal (29)	Busch Stadium	45,010	54–44
99	July 19	@ Cardinals	L 2–4	Kelly (2–1)	**Greinke** (11–6)	Rosenthal (30)	Busch Stadium	43,922	54–45
100	July 20	@ Cardinals	**W** 4–3	**Howell** (2–3)	Rosenthal (1–5)	**Jansen** (28)	Busch Stadium	45,255	55–45
101	July 21	@ Pirates	**W** 5–2	**Ryu** (11–5)	Vólquez (8–7)	**Jansen** (29)	PNC Park	28,255	56–45
102	July 22	@ Pirates	L 7–12	Worley (3–1)	**Maholm** (1–5)		PNC Park	30,629	56–46
103	July 23	@ Pirates	L 1–6	Liriano (2–7)	**Haren** (8–8)		PNC Park	30,785	56–47
104	July 25	@ Giants	**W** 8–1	**Greinke** (12–6)	Lincecum (9–7)		AT&T Park	41,753	57–47
105	July 26	@ Giants	**W** 5–0	**Kershaw** (12–2)	Vogelsong (5–8)		AT&T Park	42,060	58–47
106	July 27	@ Giants	**W** 4–3	**Ryu** (12–5)	Peavy (1–10)	**Jansen** (30)	AT&T Park	41,459	59–47
107	July 29	Braves	**W** 8–4	**League** (2–2)	Varvaro (3–3)	**Jansen** (31)	Dodger Stadium	49,630	60–47
108	July 30	Braves	**W** 3–2 (10)	**Howell** (3–3)	Hale (3–3)		Dodger Stadium	47,386	61–47
109	July 31	Braves	**W** 2–1	**Kershaw** (13–2)	Teherán (10–7)		Dodger Stadium	51,163	62–47

August (15–13)

#	Date	Opponent	Score	Win	Loss	Save	Stadium	Attendance	Record
110	August 1	Cubs	L 2–8	Hendricks (2–1)	**Haren** (8–9)		Dodger Stadium	47,900	62–48
111	August 2	Cubs	**W** 5–2 (12)	**Wright** (4–2)	Parker (1–1)		Dodger Stadium	53,354	63–48
112	August 3	Cubs	L 3–7	Jackson (6–11)	**Beckett** (6–6)		Dodger Stadium	44,713	63–49
113	August 4	Angels	L 0–5	Richards (12–4)	**Greinke** (12–7)		Dodger Stadium	53,166	63–50
114	August 5	Angels	**W** 5–4	**Jansen** (2–3)	Jepsen (0–1)		Dodger Stadium	53,051	64–50
115	August 6	@ Angels	**W** 2–1	**Haren** (9–9)	Shoemaker (9–4)	**Jansen** (32)	Angel Stadium of Anaheim	43,669	65–50
116	August 7	@ Angels	**W** 7–0	**Ryu** (13–5)	Wilson (8–8)		Angel Stadium of Anaheim	44,561	66–50
117	August 8	@ Brewers	L 3–9	Jeffress (1–1)	**League** (2–3)		Miller Park	37,434	66–51
118	August 9	@ Brewers	L 1–4	Fiers (1–1)	**Greinke** (12–8)	Rodríguez (35)	Miller Park	40,553	66–52
119	August 10	@ Brewers	**W** 5–1	**Kershaw** (14–2)	Nelson (2–3)		Miller Park	43,612	67–52
120	August 11	@ Braves	**W** 6–2	**Correia** (6–13)	Teherán (10–9)		Turner Field	20,053	68–52
121	August 12	@ Braves	**W** 4–2	**Haren** (10–9)	Minor (4–8)	**Jansen** (33)	Turner Field	31,904	69–52
122	August 13	@ Braves	L 2–3	Santana (12–6)	**Ryu** (13–6)	Kimbrel (35)	Turner Field	33,299	69–53
123	August 14	@ Braves	**W** 6–4	**Hernández** (7–8)	Harang (9–7)	**Jansen** (34)	Turner Field	19,347	70–53
124	August 15	Brewers	L 3–6	Kintzler (2–3)	**Wright** (4–3)	Rodríguez (37)	Dodger Stadium	47,272	70–54
125	August 16	Brewers	L 2–3	Gallardo (8–6)	**Kershaw** (14–3)	Rodríguez (38)	Dodger Stadium	50,849	70–55
126	August 17	Brewers	L 2–7	Peralta (15–7)	**Haren** (10–10)		Dodger Stadium	43,357	70–56
127	August 19	Padres	**W** 8–6	**Correia** (7–13)	Kennedy (9–11)	**Jansen** (35)	Dodger Stadium	45,459	71–56
128	August 20	Padres	L 1–4	Stults (6–13)	**Hernández** (7–9)	Quackenbush (1)	Dodger Stadium	46,641	71–57
129	August 21	Padres	**W** 2–1	**Kershaw** (15–3)	Ross (11–12)	**Jansen** (36)	Dodger Stadium	39,596	72–57
130	August 22	Mets	**W** 6–2	**Haren** (11–10)	Niese (8–8)		Dodger Stadium	44,374	73–57
131	August 23	Mets	**W** 7–4	**Greinke** (13–8)	deGrom (6–6)	**Jansen** (37)	Dodger Stadium	51,215	74–57
132	August 24	Mets	L 3–11	Colón (12–10)	**Correia** (7–14)		Dodger Stadium	42,290	74–58
133	August 26	@ Diamondbacks	**W** 9–5	**Hernández** (8–9)	Cahill (3–9)		Chase Field	21,758	75–58
134	August 27	@ Diamondbacks	**W** 3–1	**Kershaw** (16–3)	Miley (7–10)	**Jansen** (38)	Chase Field	28,394	76–58
135	August 29	@ Padres	L 2–3 (12)	Stauffer (5–2)	**Correia** (7–15)		Petco Park	30,818	76–59
136	August 30	@ Padres	L 1–2 (10)	Stauffer (6–2)	**Wright** (4–4)		Petco Park	43,926	76–60
137	August 31	@ Padres	**W** 7–2	**Ryu** (14–6)	Stults (6–15)		Petco Park	37,169	77–60

September (17–8)

#	Date	Opponent	Score	Win	Loss	Save	Stadium	Attendance	Record
138	September 1	Nationals	L 4–6	González (7–9)	**Hernández** (8–10)	Soriano (31)	Dodger Stadium	41,857	77–61
139	September 2	Nationals	**W** 4–1	**Kershaw** (17–3)	Fister (12–6)	**Jansen** (39)	Dodger Stadium	43,352	78–61
140	September 3	Nationals	L 5–8 (14)	Treinen (2–3)	**Correia** (7–16)		Dodger Stadium	38,404	78–62
141	September 5	Diamondbacks	**W** 2–1	**Haren** (12–10)	Nuño (2–10)	**Jansen** (40)	Dodger Stadium	43,074	79–62
142	September 6	Diamondbacks	**W** 5–2	**Wilson** (2–3)	Hudson (0–1)	**Jansen** (41)	Dodger Stadium	50,823	80–62
143	September 7	Diamondbacks	**W** 7–2	**Greinke** (14–8)	Cahill (3–11)		Dodger Stadium	43,460	81–62
144	September 8	Padres	**W** 9–4	**Kershaw** (18–3)	Despaigne (3–6)		Dodger Stadium	41,886	82–62
145	September 9	Padres	L 3–6	Cashner (3–7)	**Hernández** (8–11)		Dodger Stadium	45,213	82–63
146	September 10	Padres	**W** 4–0	**Haren** (13–10)	Kennedy (10–13)		Dodger Stadium	45,586	83–63
147	September 12	@ Giants	L 0–9	Bumgarner (18–9)	**Ryu** (14–7)		AT&T Park	41,147	83–64
148	September 13	@ Giants	**W** 17–0	**Greinke** (15–8)	Hudson (9–11)		AT&T Park	41,533	84–64
149	September 14	@ Giants	**W** 4–2	**Kershaw** (19–3)	Petit (5–4)	**Jansen** (42)	AT&T Park	41,932	85–64
150	September 15	@ Rockies	**W** 11–3	**Wright** (5–4)	Bergman (2–4)		Coors Field	29,031	86–64
151	September 16	@ Rockies	L 4–10	Matzek (6–10)	**Haren** (13–11)		Coors Field	28,983	86–65
152	September 17	@ Rockies	L 2–16	de la Rosa (14–11)	**Frías** (0–1)		Coors Field	24,866	86–66
153	September 18	@ Cubs	**W** 8–4	**Rodriguez** (1–0)	Ramirez (2–3)		Wrigley Field	33,649	87–66
154	September 19	@ Cubs	**W** 14–5	**Kershaw** (20–3)	Jackson (6–15)		Wrigley Field	33,322	88–66
155	September 20	@ Cubs	L 7–8	Grimm (5–2)	**Wilson** (2–4)	Rondón (26)	Wrigley Field	34,334	88–67
156	September 21	@ Cubs	**W** 8–5	**Perez** (1–3)	Turner (5–11)	**Jansen** (43)	Wrigley Field	31,933	89–67
157	September 22	Giants	L 2–5 (13)	Casilla (2–3)	**Correia** (7–17)	Strickland (1)	Dodger Stadium	53,500	89–68
158	September 23	Giants	**W** 4–2	**Greinke** (16–8)	Bumgarner (18–10)	**Jansen** (44)	Dodger Stadium	49,251	90–68
159	September 24	Giants	**W** 9–1	**Kershaw** (21–3)	Hudson (9–13)		Dodger Stadium	53,387	91–68
160	September 26	Rockies	**W** 7–4	**Elbert** (1–0)	Lyles (7–4)		Dodger Stadium	43,328	92–68
161	September 27	Rockies	**W** 6–5 (12)	**Frías** (1–1)	Morales (6–9)		Dodger Stadium	46,631	93–68
162	September 28	Rockies	**W** 10–5	**Greinke** (17–8)	Bergman (3–5)		Dodger Stadium	48,278	94–68

Legend: = Win = Loss = Postponement
Bold = Dodgers team member

== Postseason ==
=== National League Division Series ===
The Dodgers took on the St. Louis Cardinals in the Division Series. This was the fourth meeting of the two clubs in the postseason in the last ten years, with the Cardinals having eliminated the Dodgers most recently in the 2013 National League Championship Series.

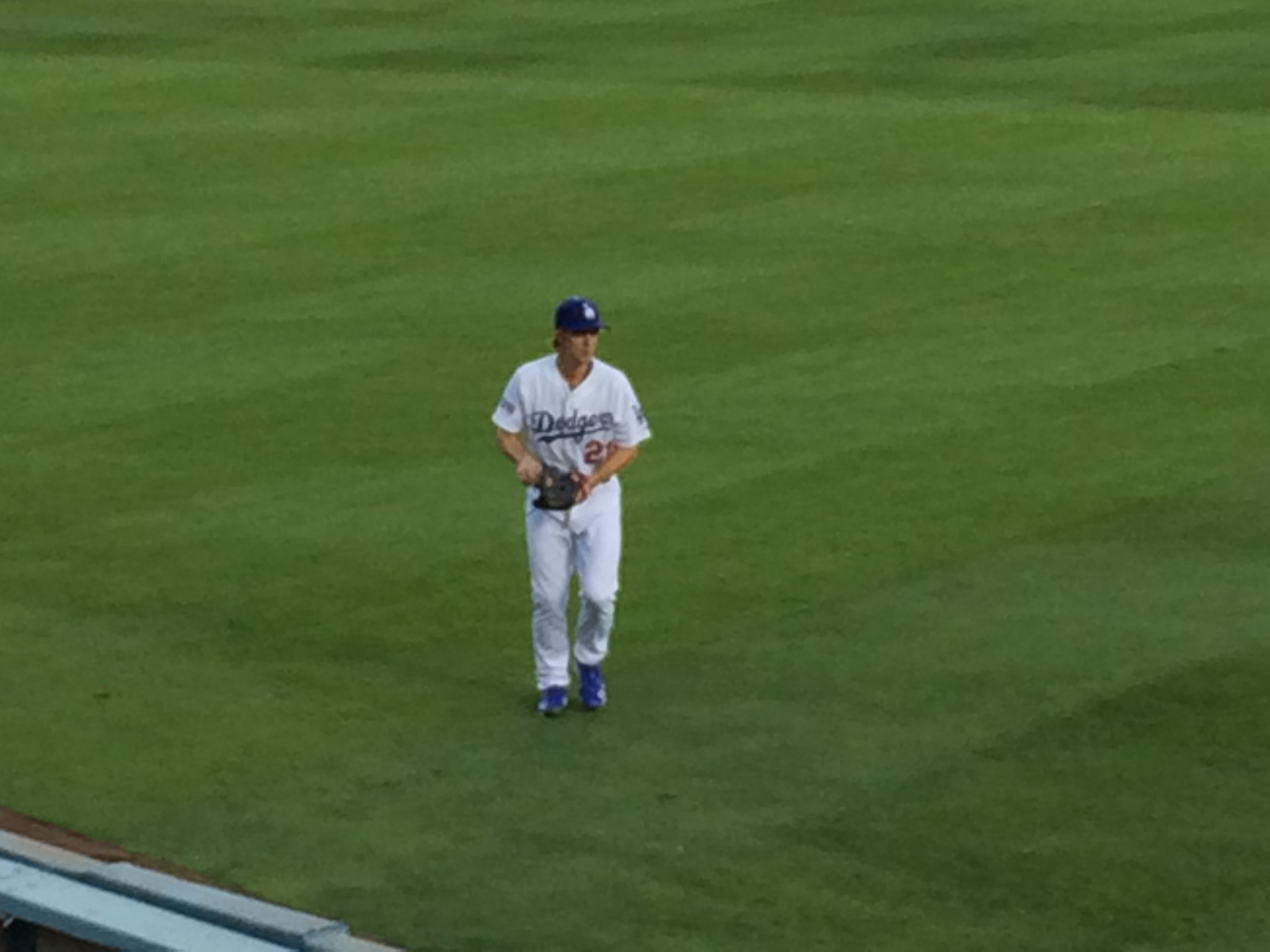
Zack Greinke warms up before game 2 of the 2014 NLDS

In the first game, the Dodgers took a 6–1 lead, thanks to A. J. Ellis who had four hits, including a home run. Clayton Kershaw, who only allowed two hits in the first six innings (two solo homers), hit the wall in the seventh. The Cardinals loaded the bases on three singles and then Matt Carpenter cleared the bases with a double to give the Cardinals the lead. A three-run home run by Matt Holliday off relief pitcher Pedro Báez put the game away, though the Dodgers did mount a rally to make the final score 10–9. Kershaw with 10 strikeouts joined Sandy Koufax as the only Dodgers in history with multiple 10 strikeout games in the postseason, though he was also the first pitcher in history to allow eight runs while striking out 10.

In game two, Zack Greinke shut out the Cardinals on two hits over seven innings, while striking out seven. Carpenter again provided the key blow for the Cardinals, with a two-run homer off reliever J. P. Howell in the eighth to tie up the game. Matt Kemp hit a solo homer in the bottom of the eighth to give the Dodgers back the lead and Kenley Jansen closed it out for a 3–2 win and even the series.

Hyun-jin Ryu made the start for the Dodgers at Busch Stadium in Game 3, his first appearance since leaving a game against the Giants with an injury on September 12. He pitched well, allowing only one run (on another Carpenter homer) and four hits in six innings. However, the Dodgers were also only able to push across one run against Cardinals starter John Lackey. For the third straight game, the bullpen faltered. This time it was Scott Elbert who allowed a two-run homer to Kolten Wong, the difference maker in the 3–1 loss.

In game four, Kershaw started on three days' rest and pitched a one-hit shutout through the first six innings. The Dodgers took a 2–0 lead, but, in a repeat of the first game, it fell apart in the seventh. Matt Adams came up with two on and hit and three-run homer that was the decisive blow. The Cardinals won 3–2 and eliminated the Dodgers in the postseason for the second straight year.

=== Postseason Game log ===
2014 Postseason
National League Division Series (1–3)

#	Date	Opponent	Score	Win	Loss	Save	Stadium	Attendance	Series
1	October 3	Cardinals	L 9–10	Gonzales (1–0)	Kershaw (0–1)	Rosenthal (1)	Dodger Stadium	54,265	0–1
2	October 4	Cardinals	W 3–2	League (1–0)	Neshek (0–1)	Jansen (1)	Dodger Stadium	54,599	1–1
3	October 6	@ Cardinals	L 1–3	Lackey (1–0)	Elbert (0–1)	Rosenthal (2)	Busch Stadium	47,574	1–2
4	October 7	@ Cardinals	L 2–3	Gonzales (2–0)	Kershaw (0–2)	Rosenthal (3)	Busch Stadium	46,906	1–3

== Roster ==
2014 Los Angeles Dodgers
Roster
Pitchers: 52 Pedro Báez; 61 Josh Beckett; 35 Kevin Correia; 64 Daniel Coulombe; 60 José Dominguez; 57 Scott Elbert; 59 Stephen Fife; 77 Carlos Frias; 63 Yimi García; 21 Zack Greinke; 14 Dan Haren; 55 Roberto Hernández; 56 J. P. Howell; 74 Kenley Jansen; 22 Clayton Kershaw; 43 Brandon League; 46,47 Paul Maholm; 51 Red Patterson; 54 Chris Perez; 75 Paco Rodriguez; 99 Hyun-Jin Ryu; 00 Brian Wilson; 44 Chris Withrow; 28 Jamey Wright	Catchers: 31 Drew Butera; 17 A. J. Ellis; 18 Tim Federowicz; 30 Miguel Olivo; Infielders: 11 Erisbel Arruebarrena; 30 Darwin Barney; 18 Chone Figgins; 23 Adrian González; 9 Dee Gordon; 13 Hanley Ramírez; 41 Clint Robinson; 72 Miguel Rojas; 45 Carlos Triunfel; 10 Justin Turner; 5 Juan Uribe	Outfielders: 37 Mike Baxter; 18 Roger Bernadina; 3 Carl Crawford; 16 Andre Ethier; 7 Alex Guerrero; 27 Matt Kemp; 65 Joc Pederson; 66 Yasiel Puig; 35 Jamie Romak; 33 Scott Van Slyke	Manager: 8 Don Mattingly; Coaches: 49 Lorenzo Bundy (third base); 82 Steve Cilladi (bullpen catcher); 50 Chuck Crim (bullpen); 85 Rob Flippo (bullpen catcher); 40 Rick Honeycutt (pitching); 48 Ken Howell (assistant pitching); Sandy Koufax (special advisor); 15 Davey Lopes (first base); 25 Mark McGwire (hitting); 12 John Valentin (assistant hitting); 29 Tim Wallach (bench); 7 Steve Yeager (catching)

== Player stats ==
=== Batting ===
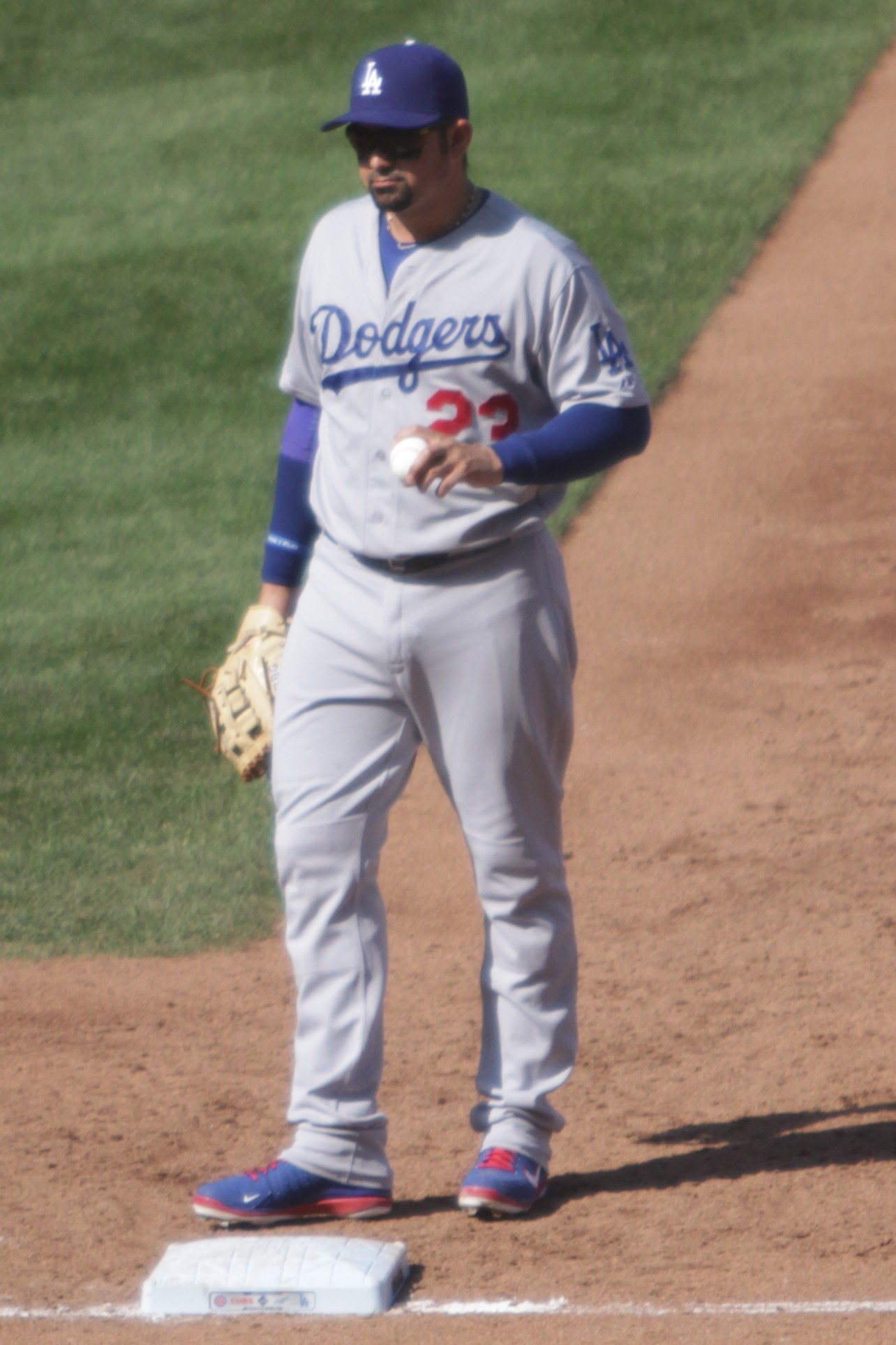
Adrián González led the major leagues in runs batted in.

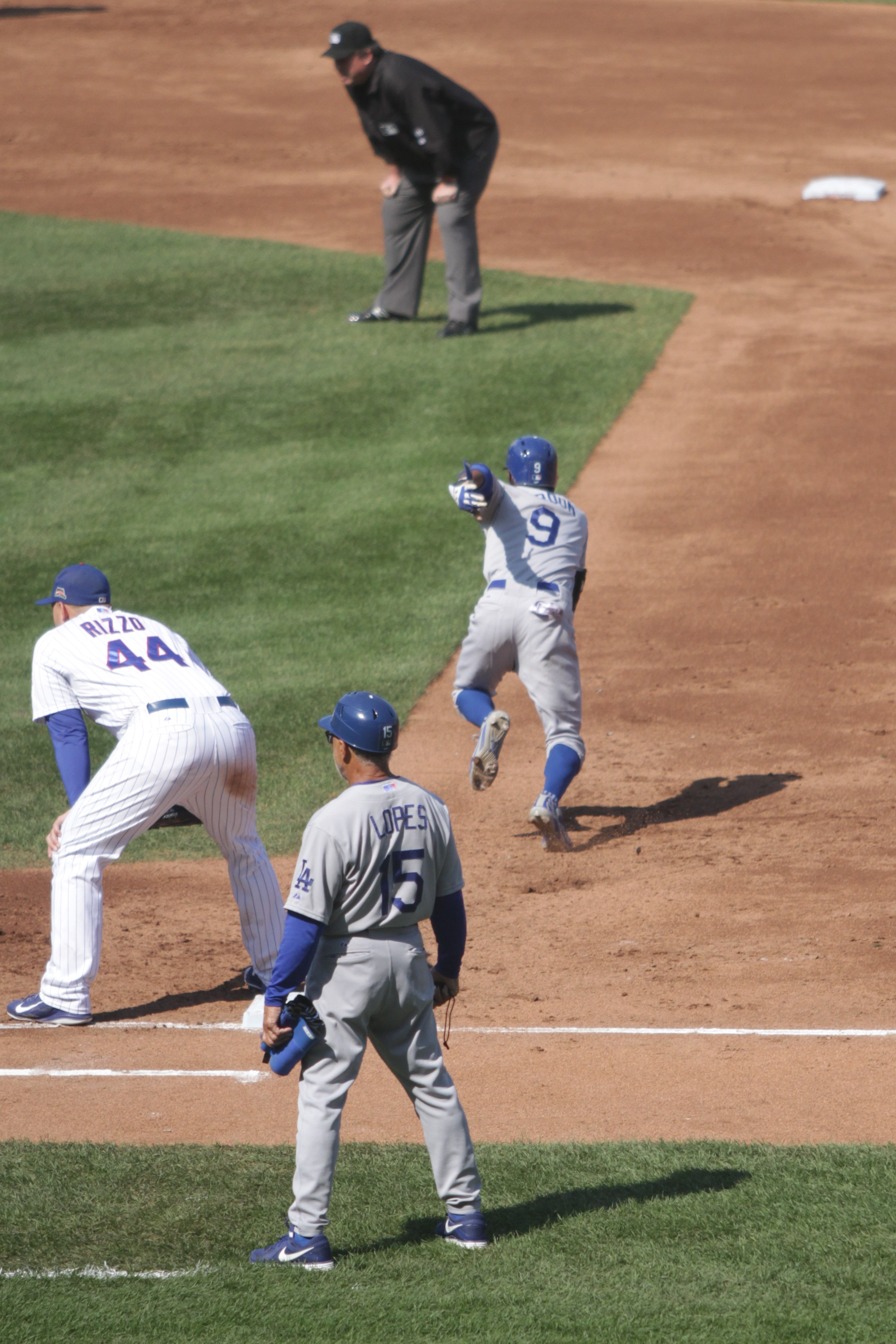
Dee Gordon (pictured stealing) led the major leagues in stolen bases and triples.

List does not include individual pitchers. Stats in bold are the team leaders.

Note: G = Games played; AB = At bats; R = Runs; H = Hits; 2B = Doubles; 3B = Triples; HR = Home runs; RBI = Runs batted in; BB = Walks; SO = Strikeouts; SB = Stolen bases; Avg. = Batting average; OBP = On base percentage; SLG = Slugging; OPS = On Base + Slugging

Player	G	AB	R	H	2B	3B	HR	RBI	BB	SO	SB	AVG	OBP	SLG	OPS
Dee Gordon	148	**609**	**92**	**176**	24	**12**	2	34	31	107	**64**	.289	.326	.378	.704
Adrián González	**159**	591	83	163	**41**	0	**27**	**116**	56	112	1	.276	.335	.482	.817
Yasiel Puig	148	558	**92**	165	37	9	16	69	**67**	124	11	**.296**	**.382**	.480	**.863**
Matt Kemp	150	541	77	155	38	3	25	89	52	**145**	8	.287	.346	**.506**	.852
Hanley Ramírez	128	449	64	127	35	0	13	71	56	84	14	.283	.369	.448	.817
Juan Uribe	103	386	36	120	23	0	9	54	15	77	0	.311	.337	.440	.777
Carl Crawford	105	343	56	103	14	3	8	46	16	55	23	.300	.339	.429	.767
Andre Ethier	130	341	29	85	17	6	4	42	31	74	2	.249	.322	.370	.691
Justin Turner	109	288	46	98	21	1	7	43	28	58	6	.340	.404	.493	.887
A. J. Ellis	93	283	21	54	9	0	3	25	53	57	0	.192	.323	.254	.577
Scott Van Slyke	98	212	32	63	13	1	11	29	28	71	4	.297	.386	.524	.910
Drew Butera	61	170	16	32	6	1	3	14	17	41	0	.188	.267	.288	.555
Miguel Rojas	85	149	16	27	3	0	1	9	10	28	0	.181	.242	.221	.464
Tim Federowicz	23	71	2	8	3	0	1	5	3	18	0	.113	.158	.197	.355
Chone Figgins	38	60	8	13	3	0	0	1	14	15	4	.217	.373	.267	.640
Erisbel Arruebarrena	22	41	4	8	1	0	0	4	3	17	0	.195	.244	.220	.464
Darwin Barney	22	33	6	10	1	0	1	7	8	3	0	.303	.467	.424	.891
Joc Pederson	18	28	1	4	0	0	0	0	9	11	0	.143	.351	.143	.494
Miguel Olivo	8	23	4	5	0	1	0	2	1	12	0	.217	.240	.304	.544
Jamie Romak	15	21	2	1	1	0	0	3	2	8	0	.048	.130	.095	.226
Carlos Triunfel	12	15	3	2	0	0	1	1	1	5	0	.133	.188	.333	.521
Alex Guerrero	11	13	0	1	0	0	0	0	0	6	0	.077	.077	.077	.154
Clint Robinson	9	9	3	3	0	0	0	2	1	1	0	.333	.400	.333	.733
Mike Baxter	4	7	0	0	0	0	0	0	1	2	0	.000	.125	.000	.125
Roger Bernadina	9	7	2	2	0	0	1	4	0	3	0	.286	.444	.714	1.159
Pitcher totals	162	312	23	51	12	1	1	16	16	112	1	.163	.207	.218	.425
**Team totals**	**162**	**5560**	**718**	**1476**	**302**	**38**	**134**	**686**	**519**	**1246**	**138**	**.265**	**.333**	**.406**	**.738**

Batting stats from MLB.com.

=== Pitching ===
Stats in bold are the team leaders.

Note: W = Wins; L = Losses; ERA = Earned run average; G = Games pitched; GS = Games started; SV = Saves; IP = Innings pitched; R = Runs allowed; ER = Earned runs allowed; BB = Walks allowed; K = Strikeouts

Player	W	L	ERA	G	GS	SV	IP	H	R	ER	BB	K
Zack Greinke	17	8	2.71	32	**32**	0	**202.1**	**190**	69	61	**43**	207
Clayton Kershaw	**21**	3	**1.77**	27	27	0	198.1	139	42	39	31	**239**
Dan Haren	13	**11**	4.02	32	**32**	0	186.0	183	**101**	**83**	36	145
Hyun-jin Ryu	14	7	3.38	26	26	0	152.0	152	60	57	29	139
Josh Beckett	6	6	2.88	20	20	0	115.2	96	41	37	39	107
Paul Maholm	1	5	4.84	30	8	0	70.2	82	44	38	28	34
Jamey Wright	5	4	4.35	61	1	1	70.1	72	35	34	27	54
Kenley Jansen	2	3	2.76	**68**	0	**44**	65.1	55	20	20	19	101
Brandon League	2	3	2.57	63	0	0	63.0	65	23	18	27	38
J. P. Howell	3	3	2.39	**68**	0	0	49.0	31	14	13	25	48
Brian Wilson	2	4	4.66	61	0	1	48.1	49	26	25	29	54
Chris Perez	1	3	4.27	49	0	1	46.1	38	23	22	25	39
Roberto Hernández	2	3	4.74	9	9	0	43.2	48	27	23	18	30
Carlos Frías	1	1	6.12	15	2	0	32.1	33	22	22	7	29
Kevin Correia	2	4	8.03	9	3	0	24.2	34	28	22	8	18
Pedro Báez	0	0	2.63	20	0	0	24.0	16	7	7	5	18
Chris Withrow	0	0	2.95	20	0	0	21.1	10	8	7	18	28
Paco Rodriguez	1	0	3.86	19	0	0	14.0	12	6	6	4	14
Yimi García	0	0	1.80	8	0	0	10.0	6	2	2	1	9
José Dominguez	0	0	11.37	5	0	0	6.1	7	8	8	3	8
Stephen Fife	0	0	6.00	1	1	0	6.0	7	4	4	1	5
Red Patterson	0	0	1.93	1	1	0	4.2	2	1	1	3	1
Daniel Coulombe	0	0	4.15	5	0	0	4.1	5	3	2	2	4
Scott Elbert	1	0	2.08	7	0	0	4.1	4	1	1	1	2
Drew Butera	0	0	10.80	2	0	0	1.2	2	2	2	0	2
**Team totals**	**94**	**68**	**3.40**	**162**	**162**	**47**	**1464.2**	**1338**	**617**	**554**	**429**	**1373**

Pitching stats from MLB.com.

== Awards and honors ==
Recipient	Award	Date awarded	Ref.
Yasiel Puig	National League Player of the Week (May 12–18)	May 19, 2014	
Josh Beckett	National League Player of the Week (May 19–26)	May 27, 2014	
Yasiel Puig	National League Player of the Month (May)	June 3, 2014	
Clayton Kershaw	National League Player of the Week (June 16–22)	June 23, 2014	
Clayton Kershaw	National League Pitcher of the Month (June)	July 2, 2014	
Dee Gordon	MLB All-Star Game selection	July 6, 2014	
Zack Greinke	MLB All-Star Game selection	July 6, 2014	
Clayton Kershaw	MLB All-Star Game selection	July 6, 2014	
Yasiel Puig	MLB All-Star Game starter	July 6, 2014	
Matt Kemp	National League Player of the Week (July 28-August 3)	August 4, 2014	
Clayton Kershaw	National League Pitcher of the Month (July)	August 4, 2014	
Vin Scully	Commissioner's Historic Achievement Award	September 5, 2014	
Clayton Kershaw	National League Player of the Week (September 8–14)	September 15, 2014	
Clayton Kershaw	Roy Campanella Award	September 22, 2014	
Matt Kemp	National League Player of the Month (September)	September 30, 2014	
Clayton Kershaw	Baseball America Major League Player of the Year	October 21, 2014	
Clayton Kershaw	Sporting News NL Pitcher of the Year Award	October 22, 2014	
Dee Gordon	Sporting News NL All-Star Second Baseman	October 22, 2014	
Clayton Kershaw	The Sporting News Player of the Year Award	October 23, 2014	
Adrián González	Fielding Bible Award	October 30, 2014	
Clayton Kershaw	Marvin Miller Man of the Year Award	November 3, 2014	
Clayton Kershaw	Players Choice Outstanding NL Pitcher	November 3, 2014	
Clayton Kershaw	Players Choice Player of the Year Award	November 3, 2014	
Zack Greinke	Gold Glove Award	November 4, 2014	
Adrián González	Gold Glove Award	November 4, 2014	
Adrián González	Wilson Defensive Player of the Year – 1B	November 5, 2014	
Juan Uribe	Wilson Defensive Player of the Year – 3B	November 5, 2014	
Clayton Kershaw	Warren Spahn Award	November 6, 2014	
Adrián González	Silver Slugger Award	November 6, 2014	
Clayton Kershaw	National League Cy Young Award	November 12, 2014	
Clayton Kershaw	National League Most Valuable Player Award	November 13, 2014	
Clayton Kershaw	Los Angeles Sports Council Sportsman of the Year	January 7, 2015	

== Transactions ==
=== March ===
- On March 19, placed RHP Chad Billingsley on the 15-day disabled list (recovery from Tommy John surgery), placed CF Matt Kemp on the 15-day disabled list (recovery from left ankle surgery) and placed RHP Josh Beckett on the 15-day disabled list (right thumb sprain).
- On March 21, placed LF Carl Crawford on paternity leave and optioned C Tim Federowicz to AAA Albuquerque.
- On March 25, activated LF Carl Crawford off the paternity list and optioned IF Alex Guerrero to AAA Albuquerque.
- On March 26, RHP Seth Rosin was claimed off waivers by the Texas Rangers and RHP Javy Guerra was claimed off waivers by the Chicago White Sox.
- On March 30, optioned RHP José Dominguez to AAA Albuquerque and placed LHP Clayton Kershaw on the 15-day disabled list with back tightness.

=== April ===
- On April 2, placed RHP Brian Wilson on the 15-day disabled list with nerve irritation in his right elbow and recalled RHP José Dominguez from AAA Albuquerque. Claimed IF Carlos Triunfel off waivers from the Seattle Mariners and optioned him to AAA Albuquerque.
- On April 4, activated OF Matt Kemp from the 15-day disabled list and optioned OF Mike Baxter to AAA Albuquerque.
- On April 6, acquired LHP Colt Hynes from the Cleveland Indians in exchange for minor league pitcher Duke von Schamann and designated OF Mike Baxter for assignment. Optioned Hynes to AAA Albuquerque.
- On April 8, placed C A. J. Ellis on the 15-day disabled list with a torn meniscus in his left knee and recalled C Tim Federowicz from AAA Albuquerque.
- On April 9, activated RHP Josh Beckett from the 15-day disabled list and optioned RHP José Dominguez to AAA Albuquerque.
- On April 15, activated RHP Brian Wilson from the 15-day disabled list and optioned LHP Paco Rodriguez to AAA Albuquerque.
- On April 21, optioned IF/OF Chone Figgins to AAA Albuquerque and recalled RHP José Dominguez from AAA Albuquerque.
- On April 27, optioned RHP José Dominguez to AAA Albuquerque and recalled IF Carlos Triunfel from AAA Albuquerque.
- On April 29, optioned IF Carlos Triunfel to AAA Albuquerque and recalled LHP Paco Rodriguez from AAA Albuquerque.
- On April 30, optioned C Tim Federowicz to AAA Albuquerque, transferred RHP Chad Billingsley from the 15-day disabled list to the 60-day disabled list, and purchased the contract of C Miguel Olivo from AAA Albuquerque.

=== May ===
- On May 1, purchased the contract of RHP Red Patterson from AAA Albuquerque and designated OF Nick Buss for assignment.
- On May 2, optioned RHP Red Patterson and LHP Paco Rodriguez to AAA Albuquerque, placed LHP Hyun-jin Ryu on the 15-day disabled list with shoulder inflammation and recalled RHP José Dominguez and IF/OF Chone Figgins from AAA Albuquerque.
- On May 4, optioned RHP José Dominguez to AAA Albuquerque and recalled RHP Stephen Fife from AAA Albuquerque.
- On May 5, optioned RHP Stephen Fife to AAA Albuquerque and recalled RHP Pedro Báez from AA Chattanooga.
- On May 6, recalled LHP Clayton Kershaw from the 15-day disabled list and optioned RHP Pedro Báez to AA Chattanooga.
- On May 14, activated C A. J. Ellis from the 15-day disabled list and optioned C Miguel Olivo to AAA Albuquerque.
- On May 21, placed 3B Juan Uribe on the 15-day disabled list with a strained hamstring, activated LHP Hyun-jin Ryu from the 15-day disabled list, optioned RHP Chris Withrow to AAA Albuquerque and recalled SS Erisbel Arruebarrena from AA Chattanooga.
- On May 26, placed C A. J. Ellis on the 15-day disabled list, with a sprained right ankle, and recalled C Tim Federowicz from AAA Albuquerque.
- On May 28, placed OF Carl Crawford on the 15-day disabled list, with a sprained left ankle, and purchased the contract of IF/OF Jamie Romak from AAA Albuquerque.

=== June ===
- On June 6, optioned SS Erisbel Arruebarrena to AAA Albuquerque, transferred RHP Chris Withrow from the 15-day disabled list to the 60-day disabled list and purchased the contract of IF Miguel Rojas from AAA Albuquerque.
- On June 13, activated C A. J. Ellis from the 15-day disabled list and optioned C Tim Federowicz to AAA Albuquerque.
- On June 14, placed IF/OF Chone Figgins on the 15-day disabled list with a strained left quad muscle and recalled IF Carlos Triunfel from AAA Albuquerque.
- On June 25, designated IF/OK Jamie Romak for assignment and purchased the contract of 1B Clint Robinson from AAA Albuquerque.
- On June 26, activated 3B Juan Uribe from the 15-day disabled list and optioned IF Carlos Triunfel to AAA Albuquerque.
- On June 29, placed IF Justin Turner on the 15-day disabled list with a left hamstring strain and recalled IF Carlos Triunfel from AAA Albuquerque.

=== July ===
- On July 3, optioned IF Carlos Triunfel to AAA Albuquerque and recalled IF Erisbel Arruebarrena from AAA Albuquerque.
- On July 6, placed IF Erisbel Arruebarrena on the 15-day disabled list with a right hip flexor strain and recalled IF Carlos Triunfel from AAA Albuquerque.
- On July 8, placed RHP Josh Beckett on the 15-day disabled list with a left hip impingement and recalled RHP Pedro Báez from AAA Albuquerque.
- On July 10, activated OF Carl Crawford from the 15-day disabled list and designated 1B Clint Robinson for assignment.
- On July 13, optioned RHP Pedro Báez to AAA Albuquerque.
- On July 18, activated IF Justin Turner from the 15-day disabled list, recalled LHP Paco Rodriguez from AAA Albuquerque and optioned IF Carlos Triunfel to AAA Albuquerque.
- On July 22, activated RHP Josh Beckett from the 15-day disabled list and optioned LHP Paco Rodriguez to AAA Albuquerque.
- On July 27, activated IF Erisbel Arruebarrena from the 15-day disabled list and optioned him to Class-A Advanced Rancho Cucamonga.
- On July 28, acquired IF Darwin Barney and cash considerations from the Chicago Cubs for a player to be named or cash.
- On July 29, designated LHP Scott Elbert for assignment.

=== August ===
- On August 2, placed LHP Paul Maholm on the 15-day disabled list with a torn anterior cruciate ligament, recalled LHP Paco Rodriguez from AAA Albuquerque.
- On August 4, placed RHP Chris Perez on the 15-day disabled list with bone spurs in his right ankle, transferred LHP Paul Maholm from the 15-day disabled list to the 60-day disabled list, and purchased the contract of RHP Carlos Frías from AAA Albuquerque.
- On August 5, placed LHP Paco Rodriguez on the 15-day disabled list with a teres major strain near his left shoulder and recalled RHP Pedro Báez from AAA Albuquerque.
- On August 6, activated IF Chone Figgins from the 15-day disabled list and designated him for assignment.
- On August 7, acquired RHP Roberto Hernández from the Philadelphia Phillies for two players to be named later or cash.
- On August 8, placed RHP Josh Beckett on the 15-day disabled list with a left hip impingement and activated RHP Roberto Hernández.
- On August 9, acquired RHP Kevin Correia from the Minnesota Twins for a player to be named later or cash.
- On August 10, placed SS Hanley Ramírez on the 15-day disabled list with a right oblique strain, retroactive to August 9, and called up IF Darwin Barney from AAA Albuquerque. Designated LHP Colt Hynes for assignment.
- On August 11, activated RHP Kevin Correia and optioned RHP Pedro Báez to AAA Albuquerque.
- On August 15, placed LHP Hyun-jin Ryu on the 15-day disabled list with a right hip strain and recalled RHP Pedro Báez from AAA Albuquerque.
- On August 16, placed 3B Juan Uribe on the 15-day disabled list with a right hamstring strain and recalled IF Carlos Triunfel from AAA Albuquerque.
- On August 19, optioned IF Carlos Triunfel to AAA Albuquerque and recalled SS Erisbel Arruebarrena from AAA Albuquerque.
- On August 24, activated SS Hanley Ramírez from the 15-day disabled list and optioned SS Erisbel Arruebarrena to Advanced Class-A Rancho Cucamonga.
- On August 31, activated LHP Hyun-jin Ryu and 3B Juan Uribe from the 15-day disabled list and optioned RHP Carlos Frías and IF Miguel Rojas to AAA Albuquerque.

=== September ===
- On September 1, activated RHP Chris Perez from the 15-day disabled list, recalled IF Alex Guerrero, RHP Yimi García, and C Tim Federowicz from AAA Albuquerque, purchased the contract of OF Joc Pederson from AAA Albuquerque and designated IF Carlos Triunfel for assignment.
- On September 2, recalled RHP Carlos Frías and IF Miguel Rojas from AAA Albuquerque and SS Erisbel Arruebarrena from Class-A Rancho Cucamonga.
- On September 6, purchased the contract of OF Roger Bernadina from AAA Albuquerque and transferred RHP Josh Beckett from the 15-day disabled list to the 60-day disabled list.
- On September 12, purchased the contract of LHP Scott Elbert from AAA Albuquerque and designated RHP Red Patterson for assignment.
- On September 13, activated LHP Paco Rodriguez off the 15-day disabled list.
- On September 16, recalled RHP Stephen Fife from AAA Albuquerque and placed him on the 60-day disabled list with a right elbow injury. Purchased the contract of LHP Daniel Coulombe from AA Chattanooga.

== Farm system ==
Level	Team	League	Manager	W	L	Position
AAA	Albuquerque Isotopes	Pacific Coast League	Damon Berryhill	62	80	Third Place
AA	Chattanooga Lookouts	Southern League	Razor Shines	61	77	Fourth Place; Lost in finals
High A	Rancho Cucamonga Quakes	California League	P. J. Forbes	65	75	Fourth Place
A	Great Lakes Loons	Midwest League	Bill Haselman	66	73	Fourth Place
Rookie	Ogden Raptors	Pioneer League	Jack McDowell	37	38	Fourth Place; Lost in playoffs
Rookie	Arizona League Dodgers	Arizona League	John Shoemaker	25	31	Second place Lost in playoffs
Rookie	DSL Dodgers	Dominican Summer League	Pedro Mega	36	34	Third Place

=== Minor League statistical leaders ===
==== Batting ====
- Average:Alex Verdugo – AZL\Ogden – .356
- Home runs: Joc Pederson – Albuquerque – 33
- RBI:Corey Seager – Rancho Cucamonga\Chattanooga – 97
- OBP: Joc Pederson – Albuquerque – .435
- SLG:Corey Seager – Rancho Cucamonga\Chattanooga – .602

==== Pitching ====
- ERA: Kevin Guzman – AZL Dodgers – 3.33
- Wins:Tom Windle – Rancho Cucamonga – 12
- Strikeouts: Chris Anderson – Rancho Cucamonga – 146
- Saves: Pedro Báez – Albuquerque – 12
- WHIP Kevin Guzman – AZL Dodgers – 1.15

==== Mid-Season All-Stars ====
- All-Star Futures Game

Pitcher Julio Urías (World team)
Shortstop Corey Seager (USA team)

- Pacific Coast League All-Stars

Outfielder Joc Pederson
Coach Glenn Dishman

- Southern League All-Stars

Pitcher Tyson Brummett
Pitcher Chris Reed
Shortstop Darnell Sweeney
Outfielder Jeremy Hazelbaker
Outfielder Scott Schebler

- California League All-Stars

First Baseman Chris Jacobs
Shortstop Corey Seager

- Midwest League All-Stars

Pitcher Mark Pope
Catcher Kyle Farmer
Outfielder Joey Curletta

==== Post-Season All-Stars ====
- Pacific Coast League All-Stars

Outfielder Joc Pederson

- Southern League All-Stars

Outfielder Scott Schebler

- California League All-Stars

Shortstop Corey Seager

- Midwest League All-Stars

Outfielder Joey Curletta

- Pioneer League All-Stars

Catcher Julian Leon
Pitcher José De León

- Arizona League All-Stars

Outfielder Alex Verdugo

- Baseball America Minor League All-Stars
  - AAA: Outfielder Joc Pederson
  - AA: Second Baseman Darnell Sweeney, Outfielder Scott Schebler
  - High A: Shortstop Corey Seager
  - Rookie: Outfielder Alex Verdugo

=== Notes ===
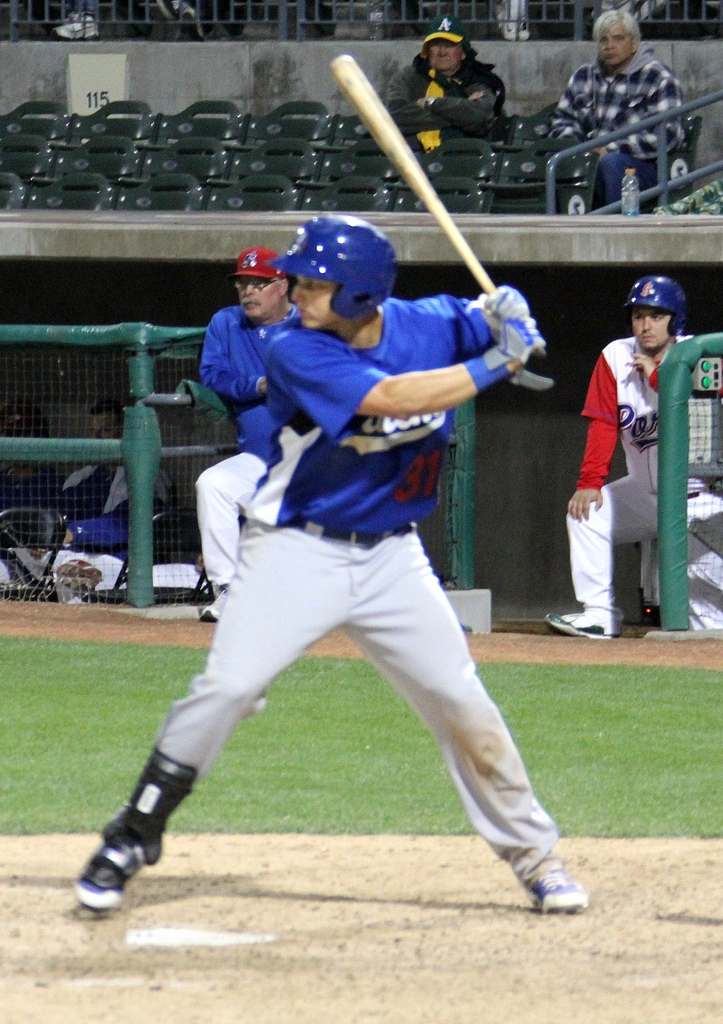
Joc Pederson was the first Pacific Coast League player in 80 years to hit 30 homers and steal 30 bases in the same season. He was selected as the league MVP.

- Shortstop Corey Seager was selected as the Most Valuable Player of the California League. In 80 games with the Rancho Cucamonga Quakes, he led the league with 34 doubles, a .633 slugging percentage, a 1.044 OPS, 54 extra-base hits and 207 total bases.
- On August 23, in his 115th game of the season Joc Pederson of the Albuquerque Isotopes became the first player in the Pacific Coast League in 80 years (since Frank Demaree in 1934, in 186 games), and the fourth all-time, to hit 30 homers and steal 30 bases in the same season. The only other Pacific Coast League hitters to do it were Lefty O'Doul (1927, in 189 games) and Hall of Famer Tony Lazzeri (1925, in 197 games). He was also only the second Dodger minor leaguer to ever do it, joining Chin-Feng Chen (1999; 31/31 for Class A San Bernardino). Pederson was also named the Most Valuable Player of the PCL.
- Pitcher José DeLeón of the Rookie-Class Ogden Raptors was named Pitcher of the Year in the Pioneer League (baseball) after he led the league in strikeouts (77) despite pitching only 54 1/3 innings.
- The rookie-class Arizona League Dodgers made the Arizona League playoffs but were eliminated by a 5–4 loss to the Mariners in the first round.
- The AA Chattanooga Lookouts won the second half Southern League title and a birth in the playoffs. They then beat the Huntsville Stars 3 games to 2 in the best-of-five semi-final series and advanced to play in the Southern League championship series. However, they were swept in three games by the Jacksonville Suns in the finals.
- The rookie class Ogden Raptors won the second half Pioneer League (baseball) title and a birth in the playoffs. However, they were swept by the Orem Owlz in the first round of the playoffs.
- On September 17, the Dodgers announced that they would be purchasing the Oklahoma City RedHawks franchise in the Pacific Coast League and that it would replace the Albuquerque Isotopes as the teams AAA affiliate. Dodger co-owner Peter Guber would be the executive in charge of the franchise. They also announced that they were switching AA affiliates as well, signing a two-year agreement with the Tulsa Drillers of the Texas League, replacing the Chattanooga Lookouts of the Southern League.
- On September 26, the Dodgers selected outfielder Joc Pederson and shortstop Corey Seager as the co-winners of the organizational "Minor League Player of the Year" award. Pederson, who also won in 2012, became the third Dodger position player to win the award twice (Billy Ashley and Paul Konerko). Julio Urías was selected as the organizations "Minor League Pitcher of the Year."
- Several top Dodgers prospects participated in the Arizona Fall League in October and November, 2014. They included the team's top prospect, shortstop Corey Seager, as well as pitchers Matt Magill, Blake Smith, Michael Thomas, Daniel Coulombe and Matt Shelton, infielder Darnell Sweeney and outfielder Scott Schebler.

== Major League Baseball draft ==
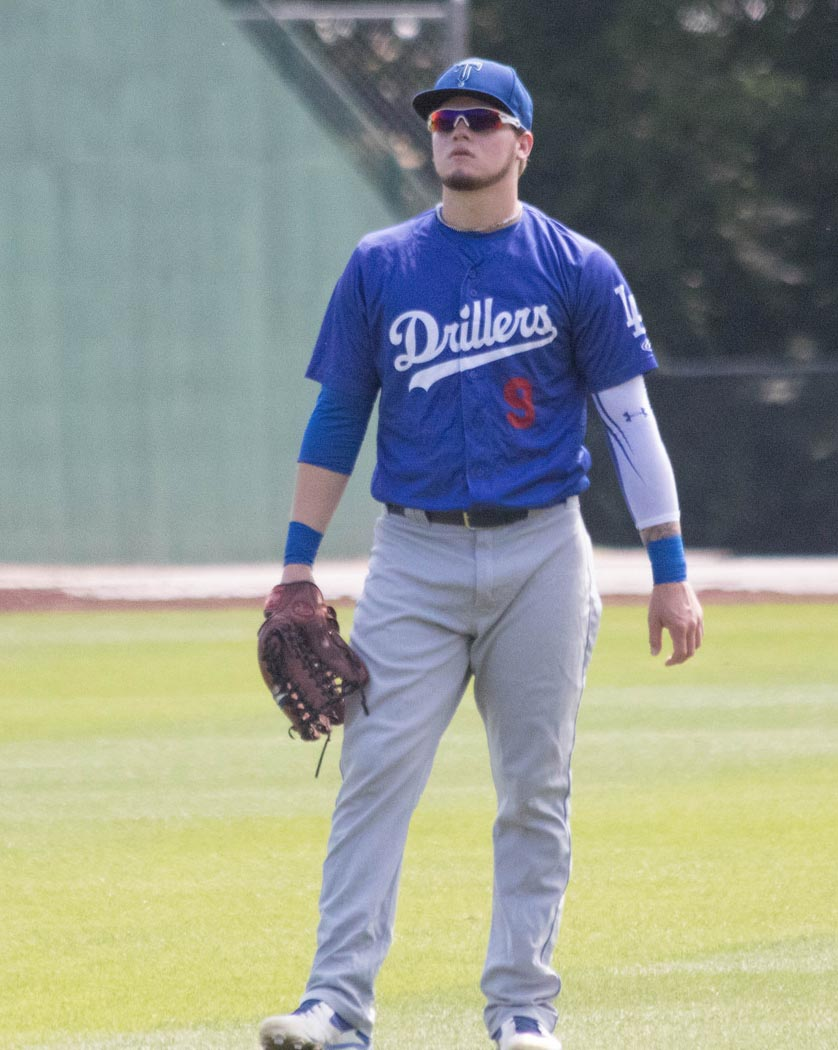
Alex Verdugo

The Dodgers selected 40 players in this draft. Of those, six of them played Major League Baseball.

The first-round draft pick was right-handed pitcher Grant Holmes from Conway High School. He was traded to the Oakland Athletics midway through the 2016 season after failing to get past class-A with the Dodgers system.

2014 draft picks

Round	Name	Position	School	Signed	Career span	Highest level
1	Grant Holmes	RHP	Conway High School	Yes	2014–present	MLB
2	Alex Verdugo	OF	Sahuaro High School	Yes	2014–present	MLB
3	John Richy	RHP	University of Nevada, Las Vegas	Yes	2014–2021	AAA
4	Jeff Brigham	RHP	University of Washington	Yes	2014–present	MLB
5	Jared Walker	3B	McEachern High School	Yes	2014–2022	AA
6	Brock Stewart	RHP	Illinois State University	Yes	2014–present	MLB
7	Trevor Oaks	RHP	California Baptist University	Yes	2014–2019	MLB
8	Hunter Redman	C	Texas Tech University	Yes	2014–2016	AAA
9	Matt Campbell	RHP	Clemson University	Yes	2014–2015	A
10	Colin Hering	OF	Coastal Carolina University	Yes	2014–2015	A
11	A. J. Vanegas	RHP	Stanford University	Yes	2014–2016	A+
12	Kam Uter	RHP	Pace Academy	Yes	2014–2017	A
13	Ryan Taylor	RHP	Arkansas Tech University	Yes	2014	Rookie
14	Kelvin Ramos	SS	San Jacinto College, North Campus	Yes	2014–2017	A
15	Joe Broussard	RHP	Louisiana State University	Yes	2014–2019	AAA
16	Devan Ahart	CF	University of Akron	Yes	2014–2019	AA
17	Tyler Wampler	SS	Indiana State University	Yes	2014–2015	A+
18	Clint Freeman	1B	East Tennessee State University	Yes	2014–2018	Rookie
19	Gary Cornish	RHP	Palomar College	No; Mets-2016	2016–2018	A+
20	Brian Wolfe	RF	University of Washington	Yes	2014–2015	A+
21	Ivan Vela	SS	Oklahoma Baptist University	Yes	2014–2015	A
22	Bubby Rossman	RHP	California State University, Dominguez Hills	Yes	2014–2017	A+
23	Andrew Godbold	LF	Southeastern Louisiana University	Yes	2014	Rookie
24	Jimmy Allen	2B	California Polytechnic State University, San Luis Obispo	Yes	2014–2015	A
25	Matt Jones	OF	Hutchinson Community College	Yes	2014–2016	A
26	Deion Ulmer	2B	Holmes Community College	Yes	2014–2015	Rookie
27	Harlan Richter	RHP	Bossier Parish Community College	Yes	2014	Rookie
28	Billy Bereszniewicz	OF	State University of New York at Binghamton	Yes	2014–2015	A+
29	Christian Trent	LHP	University of Mississippi	No; Brewers – 2015	2015–2016	A
30	Brant Whiting	C	Stanford University	Yes	2014–2017	AAA
31	Derrick Sylvester	RHP	Southern New Hampshire University	Yes	2014–2016	A+
32	Scott De Jong	1B	Felician College	Yes	2014–2015	A
33	Carson Baranik	RHP	University of Louisiana at Lafayette	Yes	2014	Rookie
34	Hunter Bross	CF	Notre Dame Prep	No		
35	Tanner Chauncey	SS	Brigham Young University	No		
36	Kyler Kocher	RHP	Mountain View High School	No		
37	Karch Kowalczyk	RHP	Valparaiso University	Yes	2014–2018	AAA
38	Caleb Ferguson	LHP	West Jefferson High School	Yes	2013–present	MLB
39	Jeff Bain	RHP	San Marino High School	No; Diamondbacks – 2017	2017–2023	AAA
40	Sam Moore	RHP	University of California, Irvine	No		
