= 2014 Philadelphia Phillies season =

Major League Baseball season

2014 Philadelphia Phillies
- League: National League
- Division: East
- Ballpark: Citizens Bank Park
- City: Philadelphia, Pennsylvania, US
- Record: 73–89 (.451)
- Divisional place: 5th
- Owners: Bill Giles; David Montgomery
- General managers: Rubén Amaro Jr.
- Managers: Ryne Sandberg
- Television: Comcast SportsNet Philadelphia; Comcast Network Philadelphia; NBC Philadelphia (Tom McCarthy, Jamie Moyer, Matt Stairs, Mike Schmidt, Gregg Murphy)
- Radio: Phillies Radio Network; WPHT 1210 AM & WIP 94.1 FM (English) (Scott Franzke, Larry Andersen, Jim Jackson); WTTM (Spanish) (Danny Martinez, Bill Kulik, Rickie Ricardo)
- Stats: ESPN.com; Baseball Reference

The Philadelphia Phillies' 2014 season was the 132nd in the history of the franchise. After a disappointing 2013, the Phillies entered the offseason with a strategy to reload rather than rebuild; they did not want to relinquish the opportunity to do well in 2014 in hopes of being competitive down the road. Commensurate with this strategy, among their key acquisitions were right fielder Marlon Byrd and starting pitcher A. J. Burnett. The Phillies began the season with new coaches (as Ryne Sandberg entered his first season as manager after taking over on an interim basis in August 2013) and new broadcasters: Jamie Moyer and Matt Stairs, two members of the 2008 World Series squad, replaced Chris Wheeler and Gary Matthews as analysts on Comcast SportsNet Philadelphia.

After offseason headlines indicated a tenuous relationship between Sandberg and shortstop Jimmy Rollins and controversy about draft picks who did not sign with the team, the season began auspiciously with an opening-day win. However, the Phillies then lost their next two games. April continued in that fashion; the team played .500 ball in their first 26 games, exceeding expectations. One commentator called them "pleasantly mediocre", despite a horrific performance from the bullpen. May was a frustrating month for the Phillies; failing to win games they were in a position to win, they posted an 11–16 record and a .230 team batting average (the worst in the National League). June was almost as bad; although the team had 12 wins and 17 losses, the bullpen improved to one of the best in the NL. In the 2014 Major League Baseball draft that month the Phillies selected Aaron Nola as their first-round pick, encouraging optimism from fans and the media. Although the Phillies began July at the bottom of the National League East Division, they amassed a five-game winning streak shortly before the All-Star break. This moved them to within nine games of .500, but they lost the last two games and had a 42–53 record at the break.

As the trade deadline approached, it was speculated that the Phillies would surrender older players to obtain younger ones. They made two deals, neither involving key components of the team. In August they had their best month of the season: a 14–13 record, thanks to strong pitching and adequate hitting. Although the Phillies began September with four pitchers combining for a no-hitter, their month deteriorated from there. The squad had an 11–15 record, finishing the season with 73 wins and 89 losses. Significant personnel changes on the field and in the front office were expected during the offseason.

== Preceding offseason ==
=== Player transactions ===
The Phillies entered the offseason with a strategy of "reloading, not rebuilding". According to Matt Gelb of The Philadelphia Inquirer, "Bold best describes what Rubén Amaro Jr. has done so far in putting together the 2014 Phillies and it sure is appropriate that the word ends with the letters O-L-D." The team wanted to re-sign Carlos Ruiz (or find another catcher) and sign a right-handed-hitting corner outfielder and a middle-of-the-rotation starter to supplement Cole Hamels and Cliff Lee after the departure of Roy Halladay and the discovery of medical problems in Cuban Miguel Alfredo González, signed by the Phillies the previous summer.

==== Players becoming free agents ====
- Outfielder Roger Bernadina – Signed minor-league contract with the Cincinnati Reds on January 31, 2014.
- Right-hand pitcher Roy Halladay – Announced his retirement from baseball as a member of the Toronto Blue Jays on December 9, 2013.
- Left-hand pitcher César Jiménez – Re-signed with the Phillies on November 15, 2013.
- Left-hand pitcher John Lannan – Signed a minor-league contract with the New York Mets on January 18, 2014.
- Catcher Steven Lerud – Signed a minor-league contract with the Atlanta Braves on January 13, 2014.
- Infielder Michael Martínez – Signed a minor-league contract with the Pittsburgh Pirates on December 13, 2013.
- Right-hand pitcher Zach Miner – Signed a minor-league contract with the Seattle Mariners on February 11, 2014.
- Infielder Pete Orr – Signed a minor-league contract with the Milwaukee Brewers on January 27, 2014.
- Right-hand pitcher J. C. Ramírez – Signed a minor-league contract with the Cleveland Indians on November 1, 2013.
- Catcher Carlos Ruiz – Re-signed with the Phillies on November 18, 2013.
- Outfielder Casper Wells – Signed a minor-league contract with the Chicago Cubs on November 23, 2013.

==== Acquisitions ====
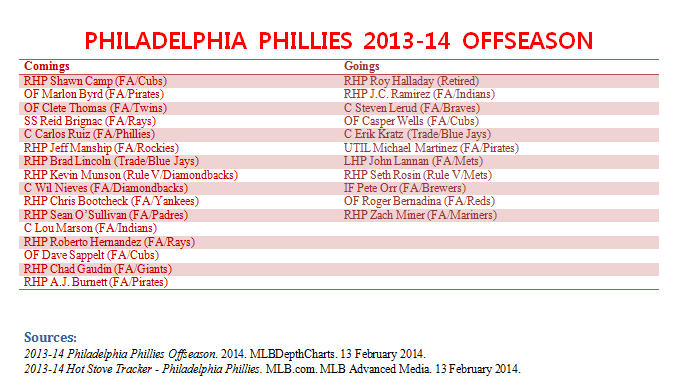
Visual aid depicting the Phillies' 2013–14 offseason transactions

The Phillies' first offseason acquisition was Shawn Camp, a right-handed middle reliever coming off an "awful" season with the Chicago Cubs who was signed on November 11, 2013, to a minor-league contract with an invitation to spring training. The next day, they signed the right-handed-hitting corner outfielder for whom they were looking: Marlon Byrd, a member of the team from his debut in 2002 to 2005, signed a two-year contract for $16 million. Soon after the agreement was announced, Phillies general manager Rubén Amaro Jr. was criticized by analyst Keith Law for overpaying Byrd; according to Law, Byrd's 2013 season was a "fluke" and an "outlier". Near the end of that week, the Phillies signed two players to minor-league contracts with invitations to spring training: outfielder Clete Thomas, who led Minnesota Twins outfielders in games played in their 2013 season (with a .214 batting average), and Cesar Jimenez, a left-handed specialist who pitched 17 innings with the Phillies in 2013. The following week the team signed infielder Reid Brignac, a well-regarded prospect for the Tampa Bay Rays who had struggled in the major leagues, to a minor-league contract with a spring-training invitation. Shortly afterwards the Phillies addressed their catching needs, re-signing Carlos Ruiz to a three-year contract (with an option for a fourth year) worth $26 million. Similar to the Byrd deal, Amaro was criticized for signing a 35-year-old catcher to a three-year contract. Cliff Corcoran wrote for Sports Illustrated, "While Ruiz may have been an underrated player in the past, heading into his age-35 season, he doesn't have far to fall before he's little more than a replacement-level catcher."

The Phillies made no more acquisitions until December; on December 2 they signed Jeff Manship, a right-handed pitcher who was mediocre as a starter and reliever (since 2011, he had an 0–5 record and a 7.44 earned run average), to a minor-league contract with a spring-training invitation. The next day they made their only trade of the offseason, sending 2013 backup catcher Erik Kratz and minor-league relief pitcher Rob Rasmussen to the Toronto Blue Jays in exchange for Brad Lincoln, a veteran right-handed relief pitcher who the Phillies hoped would improve their bullpen's depth and leadership. Uncertain if minor-league catching prospects Cameron Rupp, Tommy Joseph and Sebastian Valle were ready for the major leagues, the Phillies signed "strong defensive catcher" Wil Nieves to a one-year contract for $1.125 million as a backup. On December 12 they selected Kevin Munson, a right-handed pitcher from the Arizona Diamondbacks organization, in the Rule 5 draft; if Munson did not remain on their 40-man roster, they had to offer him back to Arizona. On December 18 they brought back Lou Marson, a top catching prospect for the Phillies "languish[ing]" on the Cleveland Indians as part of a package of players traded for Cliff Lee, on a minor-league contract with an invitation to spring training. That day, the Phillies signed four other players to minor-league contracts with invitations to spring training: right-handed relief pitchers Sean O'Sullivan and Chris Bootcheck and outfielders Dave Sappelt and Tony Gwynn Jr. Right-handed starting pitcher Roberto Hernández, formerly known as Fausto Carmona, was signed to a one-year contract worth $4.5 million.

It was nearly a month before the Phillies signed another player; on January 13, 2014, journeyman infielder Ronny Cedeño was signed to a minor-league contract with a spring-training invitation. Just over a week later they signed Chad Gaudin, a right-handed pitcher with starting and relief experience, a 5–2 record and a 3.06 ERA with the San Diego Padres in 2013 (before an August season-ending carpal tunnel injury), to a minor-league contract with an invitation to spring training; he was released on February 13, 2014, after failing a physical. On January 21 they signed Bobby Abreu, a member of the Phillies from 1998 to 2006 who had not played in MLB since 2012 but had performed well in the Venezuelan Winter League, to a minor-league contract with a spring-training invitation. On February 12, when Cole Hamels announced he would not be ready for opening day due to tendinitis in his throwing shoulder, A. J. Burnett was reportedly signed to a one-year, $16 million contract despite Amaro's previous assertion that the Phillies would make no more major acquisitions. Burnett's salary was later clarified as $15 million, with a $1 million buyout clause and a partial no-trade clause. To make room for Burnett on the roster, the Phillies designated former first-round draft pick Joe Savery for assignment; Savery was later claimed from waivers by the Oakland Athletics. Shortly before opening day, the team acquired infielder Jayson Nix (younger brother of Laynce Nix, whom the Phillies acquired for their bench several years earlier) from the Tampa Bay Rays.

=== Coaching changes ===
In Ryne Sandberg's first full season as manager (after replacing Charlie Manuel near the end of the 2013 season), he reconfigured the Phillies' staff. Among his first acquisitions were long-time friend Larry Bowa (who managed the Phillies from 2001 to 2004) as bench coach and former bench coach Pete Mackanin as third-base coach. At the same time, the team announced the retention of Steve Henderson as hitting coach. Shortly thereafter, the Phillies announced that Juan Samuel would switch from third- to first-base coach and Wally Joyner would return for a second season as assistant hitting coach. About a month later, the team reported that the Detroit Tigers had lured Joyner away as their hitting coach. Although the most difficult position to fill was pitching coach (vacated by Rich Dubee at the end of the 2013 season), on November 21 the Phillies announced that they had hired Bob McClure and retained pitching-coach candidate Rod Nichols as bullpen coach and Jesús Tiamo as bullpen catcher. Sandberg finished his staffing a week before Christmas by promoting minor-league assistant John Mizerock to assistant hitting coach.

=== TV and broadcast changes ===
On January 2, 2014, the Phillies and Comcast Sportsnet announced a 25-year, $2.5 billion TV contract; although it averaged $100 million a year, it was structured to begin below the average and end above it. Soon after the agreement was reached, Comcast (who would hire announcers under the deal) removed 37-year announcer Chris Wheeler and seven-year announcer Gary Matthews. Although the remaining Phillies announcers were disappointed with the decision, they all returned for the season. One replacement analyst was planned, and early candidates included Ricky Bottalico, Mitch Williams, John Kruk, Chris Coste, Jamie Moyer, Brad Lidge and Matt Stairs. Lidge and Kruk were among the first to be contacted, but both declined. Mickey Morandini was a possibility, but Stairs and Moyer reportedly interviewed well and were favored. On February 11, Comcast announced that Moyer and Stairs would join Tom McCarthy and Gregg Murphy on the Phillies' TV broadcast team. The company later announced that Moyer and Stairs would each call over 100 games, including 30 games together with McCarthy. After the first spring-training game, it was announced that Mike Schmidt would join the broadcast team for Sunday afternoon games.

Early in the season, the new broadcast team "struggled"; Josh Folck called Moyer boring and monotonous and Stairs inarticulate, with a tendency to mumble. McCarthy was forced to "carry the broadcast and talk as much as possible" to minimize (but not eliminate) dead air. By the season's second half it was agreed that the broadcast team had improved, but Chuck Darrow criticized Moyer's "esoteric" commentary and Stairs' poor enunciation; fans may have judged the new announcers based on standards set by Hall of Fame announcer Harry Kalas and partner Richie Ashburn. According to Awful Announcing, the broadcast team was one of the most improved in the major leagues; when Moyer announced that he would not return in 2015, the website called it "a damn shame".

=== Unsigned draft picks controversy ===
On February 20, 2014, Baseball America revealed that the Phillies reported Ben Wetzler and Jason Monda (two 2013 draft selections who did not sign with the club) to the National Collegiate Athletic Association for violating the NCAA's no-agent rule: student athletes may not use agents to negotiate professional contracts. Although players observe the "patently ridiculous" rule by routinely hiring "advisors" (usually agents), the NCAA suspended Wetzler for 11 games. The Phillies were criticized for reporting the players:

The question remains: What's the upside for the Phillies here? The practice of using agents in something less than a sanctioned manner will continue, and if anything they've made a number of advisors and college programs less likely to cooperate with them in the future. This is a pretty pitiful organization top to bottom these days, and now that indictment absolutely extends to the amateur scouting department. Bad show, Phillies.

— Dayn Perry, CBSSports.com, February 22, 2014

David Murphy of the Philadelphia Daily News asked if the Phillies wanted to punish Wetzler for not signing with them. According to ESPN's Buster Olney, the Phillies' reporting of Wetzler and Monda would hurt the team in the long run: "As time passes and the Phillies' silence continues, the impression hardens within the industry—particularly among agents and college coaches—that the team acted out of vindictiveness, because neither Wetzler nor Monda accepted their offer." He called the Phillies' decision "breathtakingly abhorrent", saying that the debacle would "tarnish the reputation of a respected organization". Amaro dismissed the likelihood of retribution by agents or players, replying, "No, I'm not", when asked if he was concerned that the organization's reporting of Wetzler would hinder its ability to "glean accurate and detailed information about a player's willingness to go pro, or even gain access to said players".

=== Jimmy Rollins and Ryne Sandberg ===
A lack of rapport between veteran shortstop Jimmy Rollins and manager Ryne Sandberg attracted attention during the offseason; ESPN's Buster Olney described sentiment in the Phillies' organization that Rollins should be traded. Amaro and Rollins dispelled the rumors, with Amaro calling them "absolute silliness". Sandberg praised backup shortstop Freddy Galvis' attitude (which many in the media saw as the manager sending a message to the team that no one – including Rollins – was above team rules), and one column examined the point at which Rollins ceased being the team's unquestioned leader. Rollins (who had a good relationship with former manager Charlie Manuel) said, "He's [Sandberg's] completely different from Charlie from the very onset, their personalities. He's pretty much a real quiet guy, he really is. Charlie was a get-in-your face with jokes type of guy. We're still learning him, he's still learning us from this side of it. Being a coach and being a manager are completely different things – you deal with so much more being a manager."

== Season notes ==
=== Spring training ===
After three spring-training games the Phillies' starting rotation already had significant health concerns, predominantly with throwing shoulders; Cole Hamels had discomfort in his left shoulder, and Jon Pettibone and Ethan Martin in their right shoulders. Although the club hoped to avoid a "patchwork" starting rotation like 2013's, it already lacked pitching depth; two top prospects, Adam Morgan and Shane Watson, were lost for most of the season due to shoulder surgery. Mike Adams, acquired by the Phillies as their setup man but who missed most of the 2013 season before offseason surgery, threw a bullpen session in late February and said he felt "real good" and hoped to join the bullpen by April. David Buchanan started the Phillies' fourth spring-training game, pitching two good innings; after the game, MLB.com Phillies beat reporter called him a dark-horse candidate for the Phillies' starting rotation. Miguel Alfredo González was less effective in that game. Early in March the Phillies announced that Hamels had a "setback" in his recovery (arm fatigue), and the likelihood of his pitching in April was "remote"; this necessitated a new fifth starter. The top candidates were Buchanan, who pitched well in his next few outings, and Jeff Manship; both had ERAs at or below 1.50 through March 11.

On March 8 the Phillies made their first minor-league demotions: seven players, including two (Michael Stutes and Luis García) with major-league experience, and top pitching prospect Jesse Biddle. On March 17 Sandberg confirmed speculation that Cliff Lee would be the Phillies' opening-day starting pitcher against his former team, the Texas Rangers and Yu Darvish, and Rule 5 draft selection Kevin Munson was returned to the Arizona Diamondbacks.

Concerns arose about methicillin-resistant Staphylococcus aureus (MRSA) in the Phillies' spring-training clubhouse at Bright House Field when, on March 21, Freddy Galvis was placed on the disabled list with a staph infection; Galvis was hospitalized, missing opening day, and the clubhouse was disinfected after the next game. Darin Ruf was also placed on the DL with an oblique strain, incurred during batting practice that day. On March 22 the Phillies demoted Maikel Franco to minor-league camp, making Cody Asche their opening-day starter at third base. Although he had been expected to make the team, Kevin Frandsen was cut from their 40-man roster; this increased the possibility that "darkhorse candidate" César Hernández would make the team. Frandsen rejected his minor-league assignment, electing to pursue free agency. The Phillies also released Ronny Cedeño, once a top candidate to replace Galvis during his injury. The club's bench narrowed when the Phillies announced that Bobby Abreu would not make the team (primarily due to lackluster defense), leaving Tony Gwynn Jr., John Mayberry Jr., Reid Brignac, Wil Nieves and Hernández likely to remain. The team acquired Jayson Nix from the Tampa Bay Rays, assigning Brignac to Triple-A Lehigh Valley. The Phillies began the season with six players on the DL: Galvis, Ruf, Mike Adams, Miguel Alfredo González, Cole Hamels and Ethan Martin.

=== Opening-day roster ===
The Phillies announced their opening-day roster on March 29, near the deadline. Since they did not need a fifth starter for two weeks, four starters, eight relievers, two catchers, six infielders and five outfielders made up the roster. Two players who did not expect to make the team when they began spring training were left-handed reliever Mario Hollands (who said he was in "shock" when he heard the news) and outfielder Tony Gwynn Jr., ending a "long road back to the majors".

2014 Philadelphia Phillies opening-day roster
Pitchers
- 59 Antonio Bastardo
- 34 A. J. Burnett
- 30 Justin De Fratus
- 63 Jake Diekman
- 27 Roberto Hernández
- 77 Mario Hollands
- 38 Kyle Kendrick
- 33 Cliff Lee
- 31 Brad Lincoln
- 60 Jeff Manship
- 58 Jonathan Papelbon
- 39 B. J. Rosenberg

Catchers
- 21 Wil Nieves
- 51 Carlos Ruiz

Infielders

- 25 Cody Asche
- 16 César Hernández
- 6 Ryan Howard
- 7 Jayson Nix
- 11 Jimmy Rollins
- 26 Chase Utley

Outfielders
- 9 Domonic Brown
- 3 Marlon Byrd
- 19 Tony Gwynn Jr.
- 15 John Mayberry Jr.
- 2 Ben Revere

Opening-day starters
Name	Position
Ben Revere	CF
Jimmy Rollins	SS
Chase Utley	2B
Ryan Howard	1B
Marlon Byrd	RF
Domonic Brown	DH
Carlos Ruiz	C
Cody Asche	3B
Tony Gwynn Jr.	LF
Cliff Lee	SP

=== March/April ===
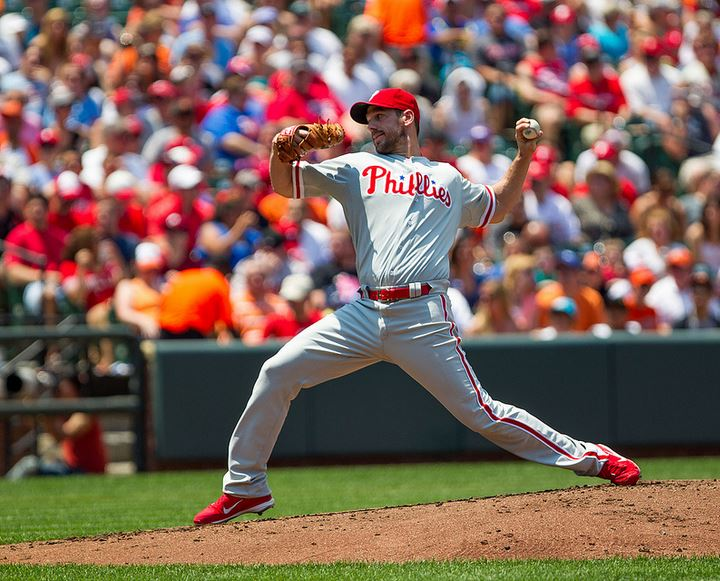
Cliff Lee pitched an opening-day win for the Phillies, despite allowing eight runs

The Phillies opened their season with a three-game series in Arlington, Texas against the Rangers. On opening day, although they took a 6–0 lead (thanks in part to a grand slam by Jimmy Rollins, his 200th career home run), but Cliff Lee gave up seven runs in the next two innings. The Phillies tied the game in the fourth inning, and over the next several innings Marlon Byrd and Cody Asche homered. Texas scored two more runs, but the Phillies won 14–10. Despite the 14 opening-day runs, Ryne Sandberg changed the lineup for the Phillies' second game (against left-handed Martin Perez) by replacing three left-handed hitters with right-handed hitters (perhaps to maximize the Phillies' platoon advantage). A. J. Burnett started, pitching six innings and giving up one run. The game was scoreless until the sixth inning before the Rangers won, 3–2, on a walk-off single by Adrián Beltré in the bottom of the ninth. Although Kyle Kendrick allowed one run in seven innings in the series' final game, Jonathan Papelbon gave up three runs in the ninth inning (including a walk-off walk to Shin-Soo Choo) to blow the save. The Phillies lost two of their first three games, despite strong starting pitching in the last two.

The club then traveled to Chicago to play the Cubs. They won the first game of the series, 7–2, thanks to home runs by Utley and Mayberry and strong pitching from starter Roberto Hernández (who got credit for the win) and five relief pitchers who combined for 4 2/3 scoreless innings. The next day Lee threw seven scoreless innings and Papelbon recorded his first save of the season as the Phillies defeated the Cubs, 2–0; Utley was three-for-three, including a home run, to lead the team offensively. The Phillies lost the final game of the series, 8–3, as Burnett gave up eight runs (four earned) in 5 2/3 innings and the offense was 1-for-15 with runners in scoring position.

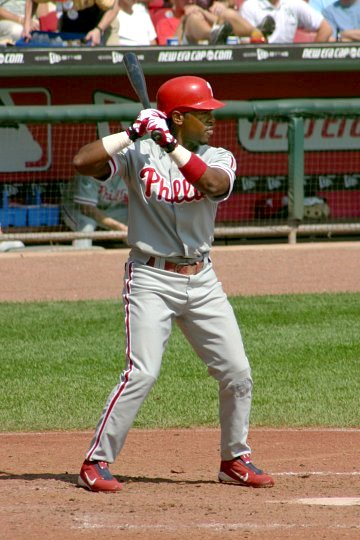
Jimmy Rollins hit a walk-off home run to give the Phillies a win on April 12.

In the home opener against the Brewers, starter Kyle Kendrick gave up two of Ryan Braun's three home runs and allowed six runs (four earned) in five innings for a 10–4 loss. The next day the Phillies again lost, 9–4, after the bullpen gave up five runs in the last three innings; three of the Brewers' nine runs were unearned, after two infield errors. They were swept in the series, losing the final game 6–2 (the first time since 2007 the Phillies were swept in their first home series). In the series the Brewers scored 25 runs on 38 hits, 17 of which were extra base hits. Sandberg said, "The good news is they are leaving town. Now we have to concentrate on gaining some momentum ... "

The home stand continued with a three-game series against the Miami Marlins. In the opener, Marlins starter José Fernández gave up a career-high six runs. A. J. Burnett, the Phillies' starter, left the game after five innings with an apparent groin injury (although he did not miss a start) and the Phillies won 6–3. Jonathan Pettibone made his season debut the next day, pitching five innings and allowing one run. The game went into extra innings, and in the bottom of the 10th Rollins hit a walk-off home run for a 5–4 win. The Phillies had their first series sweep of the season and returned to a .500 winning percentage (six wins and six losses) the next day, defeating the Marlins 4–3 with two RBIs from backup catcher Wil Nieves and a home run by Utley to break a late tie.

The Atlanta Braves then visited Philadelphia for a four-game series. In game one, Hernandez started for the Phillies and Ervin Santana for the Braves. After a pitchers' duel through seven innings, the Braves hit back-to-back-to-back home runs in the top of the eighth before the Phillies rallied with five runs in the bottom of the inning (a two-RBI single by Byrd and a three-run home run by Domonic Brown) for a 6–5 lead entering the ninth. Since Papelbon had pitched in the previous three games, he was unavailable as a closer. Jake Diekman pitched the ninth inning, allowing a grand slam by Dan Uggla for a final score of 9–6. Jackie Robinson Day, scheduled to be celebrated by the Phillies and Braves on April 15, was postponed to the following day when the game was rained out. On April 16 Lee pitched nine innings, striking out 13 batters and giving up one run for a 1–0 loss. In the series' last game, Burnett pitched seven shutout innings in a scoreless game before Ben Revere hit an RBI single in the eighth; Papelbon pitched a scoreless ninth inning for the save in the 1–0 win. The Phillies finished the home stand with a 4–5 record.

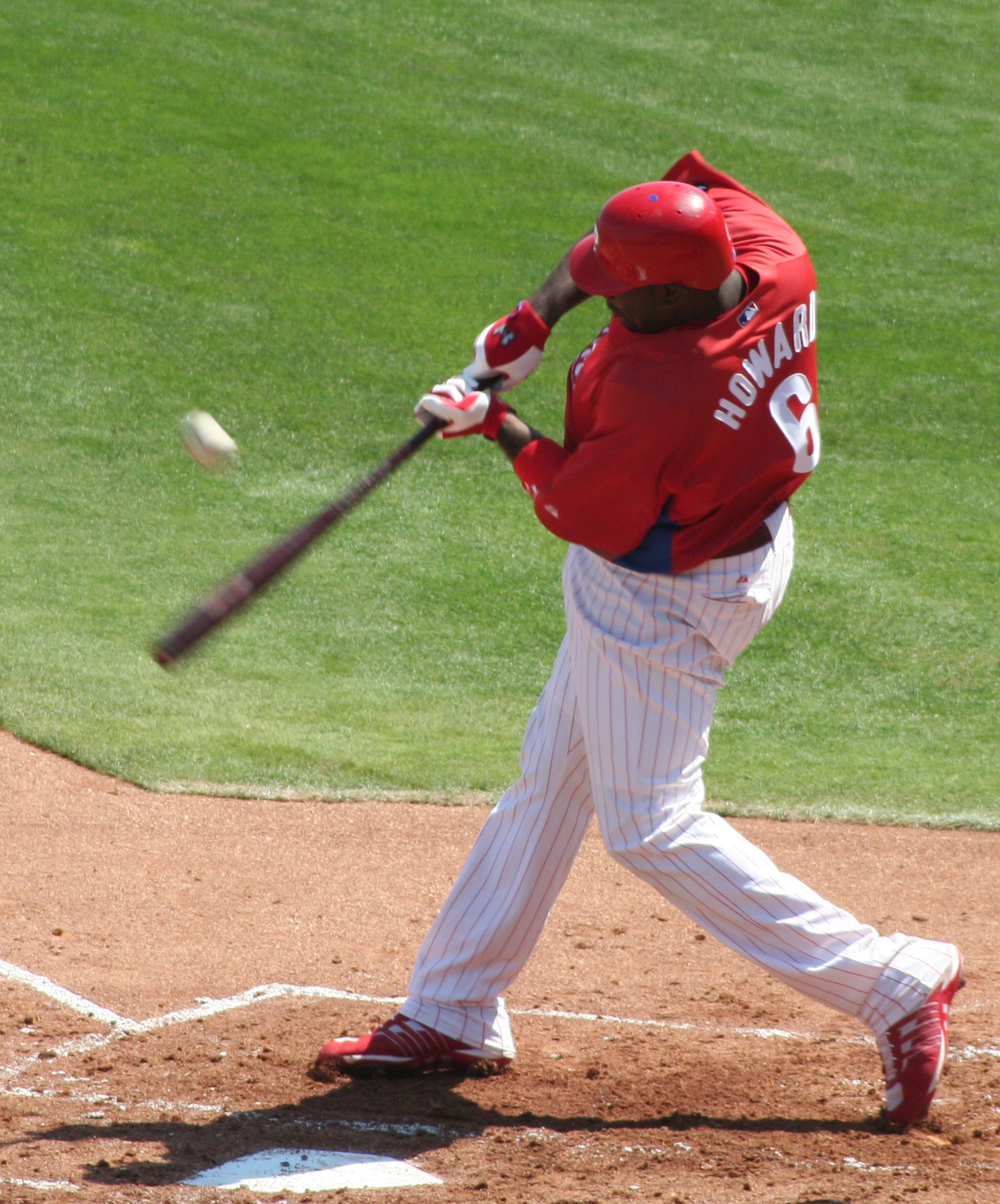
On April 20 Ryan Howard was a double away from hitting for the cycle, driving in three runs against the Colorado Rockies.

The Phillies began a road trip with a three-game series against the Colorado Rockies. In game one, Pettibone gave up eight runs in four innings; with two hits, the Phillies lost 12–1. After the game, Pettibone was sent to the Triple-A (AAA) Lehigh Valley IronPigs. Although Kendrick had a quality start in the second game, the Phillies scored one run in a 3–1 loss. They salvaged the final game of the series, winning 10–9 despite Hernandez giving up six runs in four innings; Ryan Howard was four-for-five at the plate, including a home run, a triple and three RBIs. The Phillies lost the lead three times before winning the game. The team then opened a four-game series against the Los Angeles Dodgers. Lee pitched a "gem" of a game, striking out 10 batters in eight shutout innings; Carlos Ruiz, in the cleanup spot, hit two doubles and a home run for four RBIs (his first of the season) for the Phillies' 7–0 win. They won the second game in 10 innings; Brown doubled, scoring Ruiz in the top of the 10th for a 3–2 lead held by Papelbon for his sixth save. Burnett had a good outing, and several relievers provided "stress-free performances" for the victory (which brought the team's winning percentage to .500). The Phillies lost game three, Cole Hamels' season debut after an injury, 5–2; although Hamels had a quality start, the bullpen gave up three runs and the offense had five hits and struck out 13 times. Kendrick pitched the final game of the series for a 7–3 win, behind strong offense from Ruiz (who reached base in all five plate appearances, scoring twice and driving in two runs) and Byrd (who had four RBIs). In game two the Phillies rallied from a 5–0 deficit to win, 6–5. Ruiz was three-for-four, with two runs and an RBI; Gwynn had a pinch-hit RBI double, and Asche had a pinch-hit two-RBI double for the Phillies (who scored all their runs in the seventh and eighth innings). Papelbon recorded his seventh save. The Phillies finished the road trip with a 2–0 victory behind a "brilliant" Burnett, for a 6–4 record on the trip. For his .500 batting average on the road trip, Ruiz was named the NL Player of the Week.

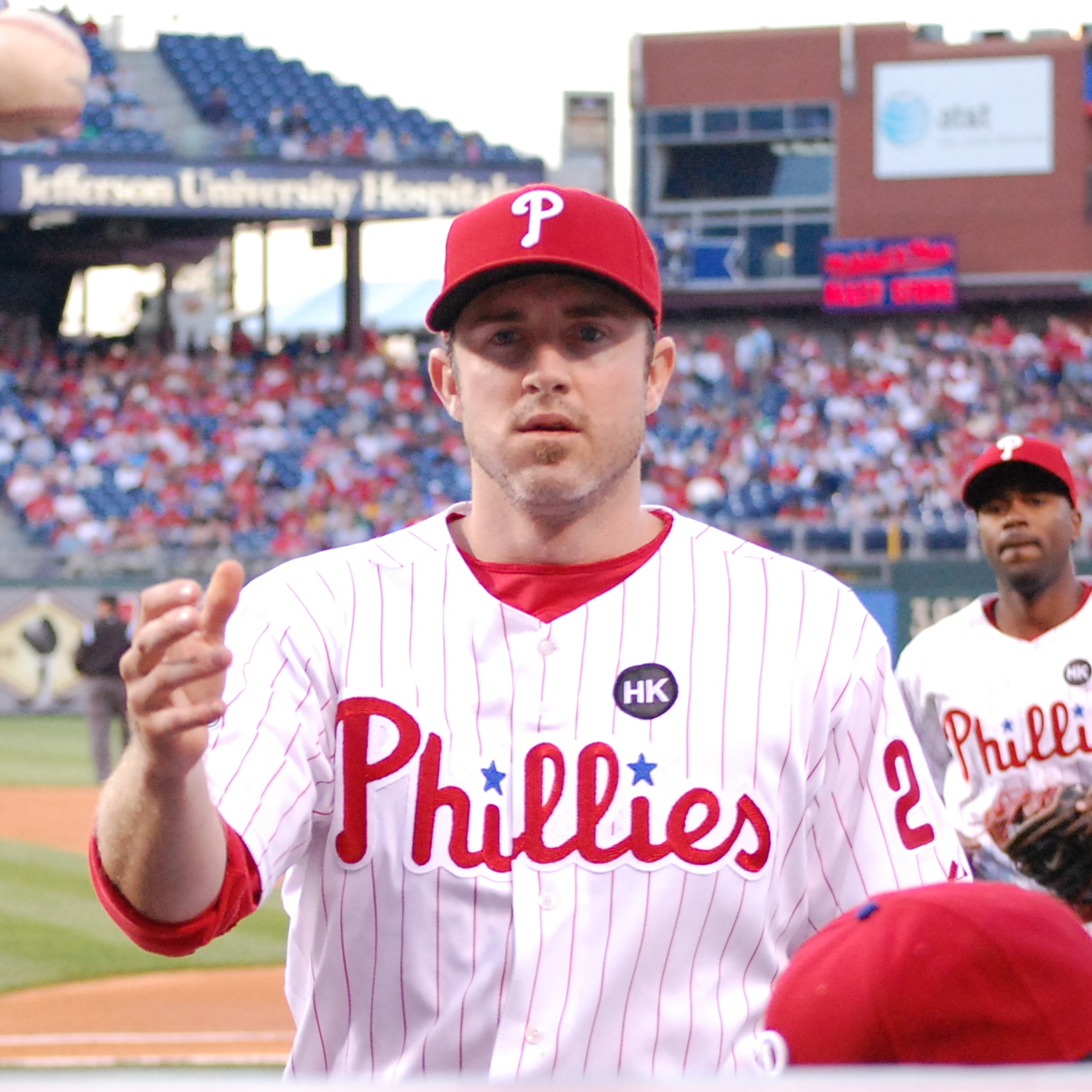
Utley had an outstanding April, with a .355 batting average.

To end April, the Phillies headed home for a two-game series against the New York Mets. The first game was delayed due to rain; it rained throughout the game, which the Mets won 6–1 after the "truly embarrassed" Hamels struggled on the mound. The Phillies announced that the game scheduled for April 30 would be rescheduled for June 2 due to rain, and ended the month with a 13–13 record.

Although Miguel Alfredo González had progressed in his rehab and Darin Ruf and Ethan Martin were closer to joining the team, the Phillies had no projected return date for any of them. Another problem during the first month of the season was the lack of third-base production; in the season's first 25 games the combined third-base batting average was .165, and the combined pitchers' batting average was .196. Asche, Jayson Nix and Freddy Galvis had not asserted themselves, leading to speculation about the early arrival of prospect Maikel Franco despite his struggle at the AAA level. At the end of the season's first month, the team's offensive leaders were Utley (.355 batting average), Howard (five home runs), Byrd (17 RBIs) and Revere (10 stolen bases). Pitching leaders were Lee and Antonio Bastardo (three wins), Burnett (2.15 ERA), Lee (41 innings pitched) and Mario Hollands (1.000 walks plus hits per inning pitched). The bullpen struggled in April, with the worst ERA in the National League and three opening-day relievers relegated to AAA. Philly.com columnist Justin Klugh called the team "pleasantly mediocre", noting their .500 record despite a tough early-season schedule.

=== May ===
This is an important series at the beginning of an important stretch for the Phillies ... If they are serious about their abilities to challenge for a postseason berth, this is the time to assert themselves as legitimate contenders. But Friday's 5-3 loss to the Nationals at Citizens Bank Park unfolded like so many other losses the past couple seasons. The Phillies took an early lead, but could not extend it. The bullpen then blew a one-run lead in spectacular fashion in the eighth inning to waste a fine starting pitching performance from Cliff Lee. The Phillies dropped to 4-7 at home, and 13-14 overall after spending the entire month of April fighting and clawing to post a winning record.

— Todd Zolecki, May 3, 2014

The Phillies' first May game opened a series with the Washington Nationals on May 2. The Nationals won, 5–3, despite a quality start by Lee. Philadelphia won game two 7–2, thanks to a strong start from A. J. Burnett (the first Phillies starter of the season to win a home game), a Cody Asche home run and four–for-five hitting by Jimmy Rollins. The Phillies took the series' rubber match, 1–0, with a strong start from Roberto Hernandez and a first-inning RBI triple by Jimmy Rollins. The team then hosted the Toronto Blue Jays, with Kyle Kendrick starting against former Phillie J. A. Happ in the series' first game. The Phillies lost, 3–0; Kendrick had no run support, losing his eighth consecutive decision (dating back to 2013) despite a "decent" ERA. The club lost the next night as well, with Cole Hamels giving up five runs in six innings; despite a sixth-inning grand slam by Asche to tie the game, the Blue Jays came back in extra innings for a 6–5 win. The home-and-home series then moved to Toronto for two games, where the Phillies gave up nine runs in the seventh inning of the first game to lose 10–0. After the game, Shawn Camp was outrighted from the roster and Luis García recalled. The series concluded the next night, with five Blue Jays home runs giving them a 12–6 win. The Phillies then began a three-game series at Citi Field with the New York Mets. Hernandez started game one, pitching five innings and allowing one run; in his first hit of the day, Marlon Byrd batted in Chase Utley (the go-ahead run) in the top of the 11th inning. Papelbon saved the game in the bottom of the 11th and the Phillies won 3–2, snapping a four-game losing streak. They won another one-run game (5–4) the next night; Ryan Howard's RBI single in the top of the ninth gave the Phillies the lead, and Papelbon recorded his 11th save of the season. In the final game of the series Hamels consistently had "an answer" to the Mets' offense, throwing a career-high 133 pitches in seven innings, allowing one run and striking out 10 hitters. Entering the ninth inning, the Phillies led 4–1; with Papelbon unavailable, Antonio Bastardo and Hernandez squandered the lead and the Phillies lost 5–4 in 11 innings. The teams finished a series which was " ... ugly, between two deeply flawed teams: more than 12 hours of game time, nearly 80 runners left on base combined."

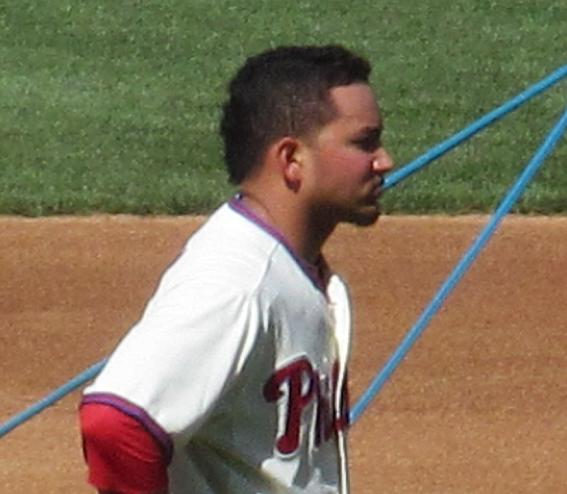
Freddy Galvis

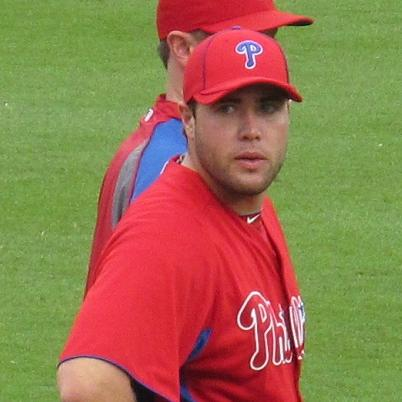
Darin Ruf

In May, Freddy Galvis (left) went on the disabled list and Darin Ruf (right) returned from it.

Days after he was optioned to AAA, Freddy Galvis broke his clavicle and the Phillies outrighted Jayson Nix from the 40-man roster, leaving the team with an infield hole despite the recall of Reid Brignac. The Los Angeles Angels came to Citizens Bank Park for a two-game series on May 13–14. On the 13th the Angels won, 4–3; the four Angel runs (all unearned) were scored in the sixth inning, when Asche committed two of his three errors, and Lee received the loss despite having no earned runs. The Phillies dropped four games below .500 (17–21) the next night, losing the series' second game 3–0 after Burnett "struggled through five innings". The team then began a three-game series against the Cincinnati Reds. In game one, Devin Mesoraco hit a three-run home run and the Reds' pitching shut out the Phillies; despite a quality start, Kendrick had another loss. After two straight shutouts the Phillies scored 12 runs in the next game, defeating Cincinnati 12–1 for Hamels' 100th career win; Domonic Brown had a home run and five RBIs, Asche had three RBIs and César Hernández hit his first major-league home run. The Phillies took the rubber match of the series, winning 8–3 with four home runs (by Rollins, Asche, Byrd and Wil Nieves) and a solid start from Lee (his last before joining the 15-day disabled list May 21 with to a left-elbow strain; the team recalled Ruf, who returned from injury). After a day off the Phillies played the Marlins in Miami, their second meeting of the season. The Phillies won the series' first game 6–5, with Burnett settling in after disagreements over the strike zone with home-plate umpire Will Little early in the game; Marlins manager Mike Redmond was later ejected from the game for arguing balls and strikes. Burnett pitched five innings, Rollins homered and Papelbon held on in the ninth for his 12th save. The Phillies lost the next two games: 14–5 on May 21, with a Marcell Ozuna grand slam, and 4–3 on May 22 with a walk-off single by Christian Yelich.

We just can't get on a roll, you know. Can't get things going in the right direction. Big win last night, and coming in today ... guys battled back, just couldn't pull it out.

— Kyle Kendrick, after Phillies' 14-inning loss on May 31, 2014.

Next, the Dodgers came to Citizens Bank Park for a three-game series. After the Phillies lost game one (2–0) in a pitchers' duel between Hernandez and Clayton Kershaw, when they were zero-for-nine with runners in scoring position, David Buchanan made his major-league debut on May 24. The Phillies won 5–3, with Buchanan getting the win after a five-inning start and Papelbon earning his 13th save. The next day, Josh Beckett pitched a no-hitter for a 6–0 Dodger victory. The next day (Memorial Day), Kendrick had his first win since August 6, 2013; Howard's five RBIs gave the Phillies a 9–0 win over the Colorado Rockies. The team lost game two of the series, 6–2, despite Ben Revere's first major-league home run; Hamels allowed four runs in seven innings, and Jeff Manship gave up two more in the eighth.

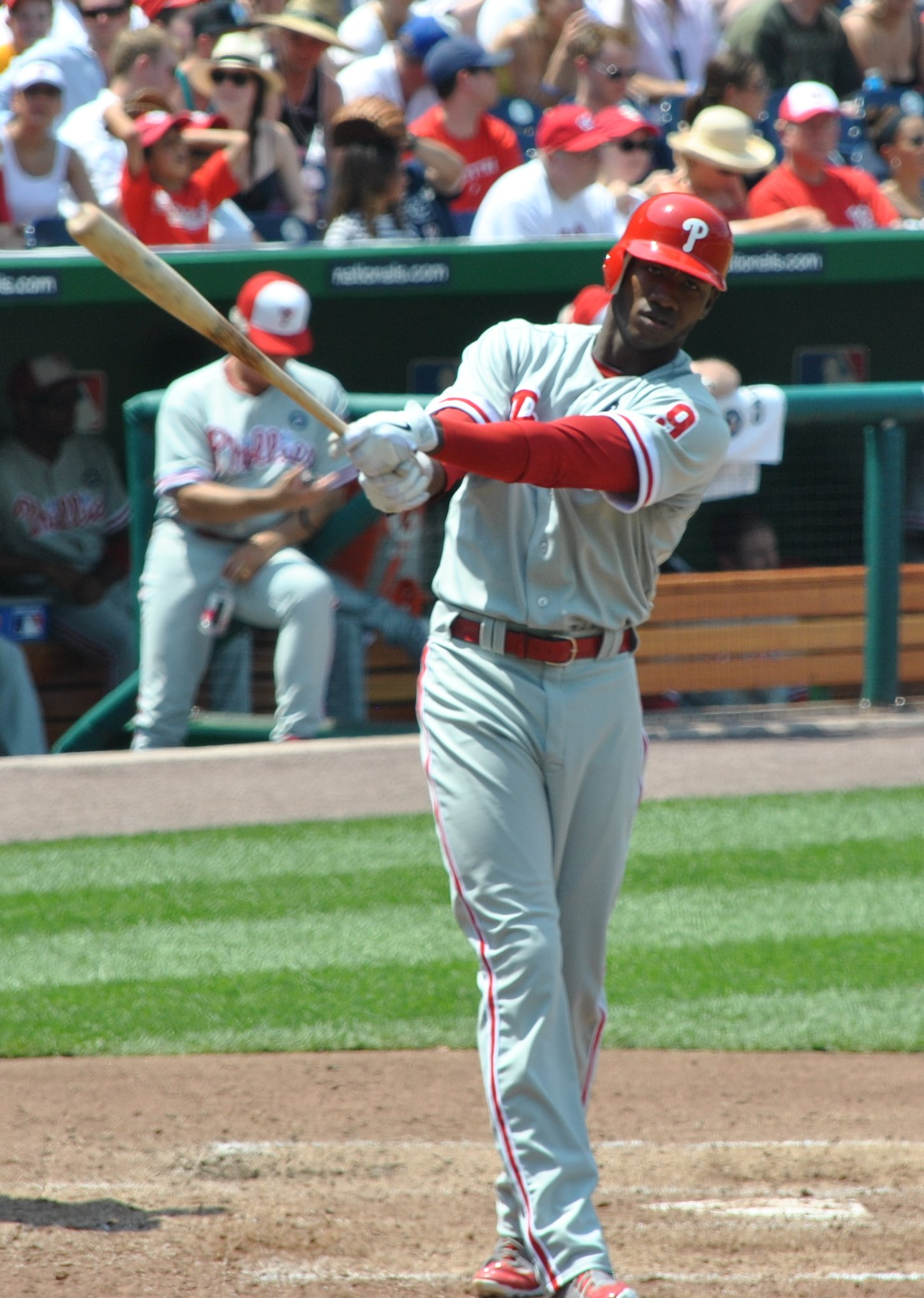
Domonic Brown's struggles continued into May, when he had a .146 batting average.

The Phillies ended the month with a five-game series, continuing into June, against the New York Mets. Although Buchanan's second major-league start in the series opener was a quality start, the Phillies offense managed one run for a 4–1 loss. The last two games of May went 14 innings apiece, with the Phillies winning the first and losing the second. In the first game A. J. Burnett threw seven innings and allowed five runs, after which six relievers threw a combined seven scoreless innings. Ruiz had four hits and Brown had four RBIs; Reid Brignac hit a walk-off RBI single to left field in the 14th inning, scoring Byrd for a 6–5 win. The next night, after the Phillies fell behind 4–0, Howard hit a seventh-inning three-run home run; in the bottom of the ninth, Brown hit an RBI single to tie the game and send it into extra innings. In the 14th inning David Wright hit an RBI single to take the lead, which the Mets' bullpen held to win 5–4.

In May the Phillies' team batting average (.230) was the lowest in the National League, and they were near the bottom in runs scored, home runs and slugging percentage. For the season to date they were 10th in the NL in batting average (.243), 12th in home runs (43), fourth in walks and 10th in strikeouts. Despite offensive mediocrity the pitching staff improved since April, with the starting rotation's May ERA (3.96) sixth in the NL and the bullpen's ERA (3.35) eighth in the league. The bullpen remained near the bottom of the NL, with a 4.05 ERA for the season to date. Asche had a strong May (unlike April) before his injury, with a .317 batting average, three home runs and 12 RBIs. Although Utley regressed from April, he had a .291 batting average and 13 RBIs. Brown struggled, batting .146 despite 17 RBIs (second on the team). Kendrick led the pitching staff in May innings pitched, with 37 2/3; Burnett led with two wins, and Hernandez had a 1.73 ERA in four starts and two relief appearances (among the best on the staff). At the end of May, the Phillies were 24–29 for the season and 11–16 for the month.

=== June ===
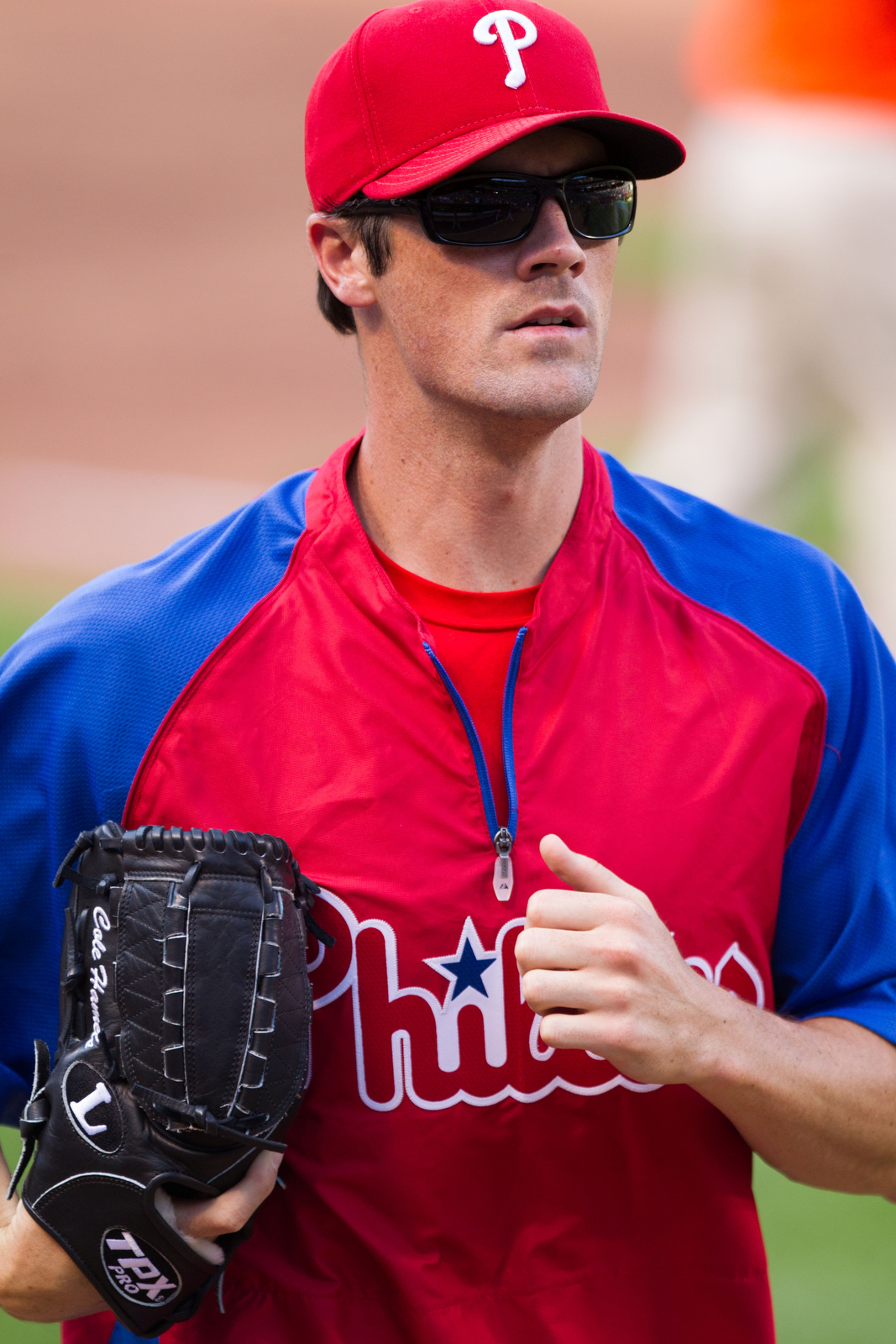
Although the Phillies began June with five straight losses, Cole Hamels continued his career success against the Reds by pitching 7 2/3 shutout innings on June 6.

After two consecutive extra-inning games, the Phillies recalled Philippe Aumont from Triple-A and Cesar Jimenez from the 15-day disabled list (for a strained right quadriceps) to replace Darin Ruf and Jeff Manship before game four of their five-game series with the Mets; it was the first major-league roster appearance for both. The team's first June game went into extra innings. With the score tied 2–2 after nine, Aumont gave up two runs in the top of the 11th inning; the Phillies scored once in the bottom of the inning, losing 4–3. They lost the fifth game of the series, 11–2. "After five games and 57 innings of torturous baseball, the Phillies-Mets Citizens Bank Park horror show is finally over. And it did not go well," wrote John Stolnis of The Good Phight, the Phillies blog on SBNation.com. Before their next series the Phillies demoted Aumont (who had a 21.60 ERA in two appearances) to the minor leagues and recalled Ethan Martin, who pitched well in Triple-A after an early-season shoulder injury. For additional pitching depth they signed Jason Marquis, who was returning from Tommy John surgery. Although before the series with the Nationals Sandberg had a "serious meeting" with the players to explain the need for greater urgency on the field, the Phillies were swept. In game one they were shut out for the seventh time in their last 27 games, losing 7–0 as Buchanan struggled in his first road start. Burnett started the next night, also struggling through six innings and allowing eight runs in a rain-delayed 8–4 loss. When Kendrick started the series' final game, the Phillies jumped into the lead with a first-inning run before losing 4–2 (their sixth consecutive loss). After the series, the team called up Ronny Cedeño for his Phillies debut.

The Phillies then began a road trip, with their first stop Cincinnati. Before the trip they placed Mike Adams (with an inflamed right rotator cuff) on the disabled list and promoted Ken Giles, a top prospect with a 100-mile-per-hour (160 km/h) fastball. The Phillies snapped a six-game losing streak when they scored eight runs and Cole Hamels pitched 7 2/3 shutout innings for an 8–0 win. They lost the next game 6–5, as two innings ended with runners thrown out at home plate by relays from the outfield. The first play was reviewed because of the new MLB rule limiting a catcher's ability to block home plate, and Sandberg was ejected from the game for arguing the result (the first time he was thrown out since he began managing the Phillies). The Reds won the series' final game, 4–1, before the Phillies returned home to sweep the San Diego Padres. In game one, Burnett earned his first win in six starts and Papelbon his 300th career save in a 5–2 final. The next night was a scoreless, 8 1/2-inning pitchers' duel between Hamels and Tyson Ross before Reid Brignac's three-run walk-off home run. Brignac had another "key hit" the next day, when the Phillies won 7–3 with strong pitching from Kendrick. The home stand continued with a series against the Cubs. The first game was a 1960s "turn back the clock" night, with both teams in 1964 uniforms. The Cubs won, 2–1; in a move called "horrible" by Phillies announcer Jamie Moyer, home-plate umpire Mark Ripperger ejected Roberto Hernandez from the game in the sixth inning for hitting Starlin Castro without first warning Hernandez. Sandberg was ejected for arguing Hernandez' ejection. In game two Jimmy Rollins hit a single to right field, passing Mike Schmidt to become the Phillies' all-time hitting leader with 2,235. They won 7–4, with Buchanan earning his second win of the season and Papelbon his 15th save. The Cubs won the Father's Day rubber match of the series 3–0, with Travis Wood holding the Phillies to three hits.

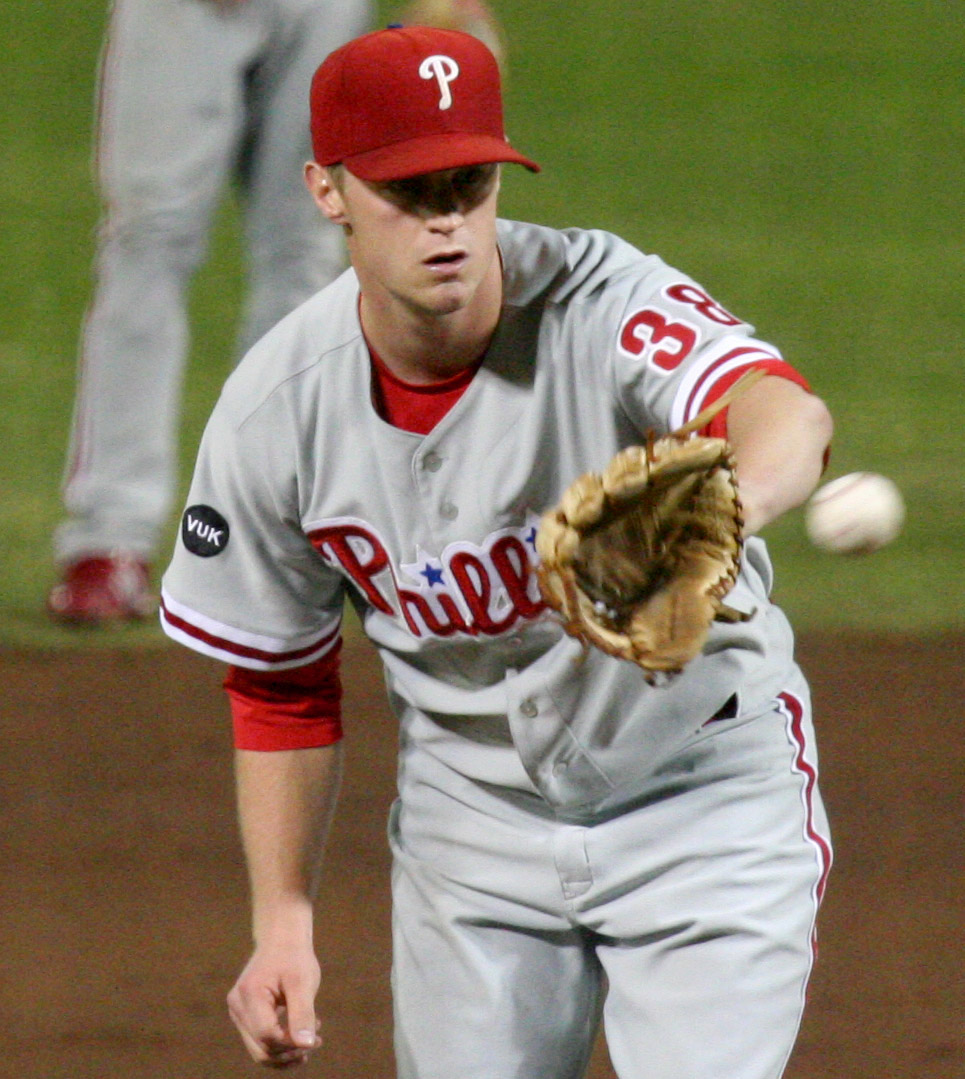
Kyle Kendrick made a strong start against the Atlanta Braves on June 19, overcoming his previous early-inning struggles.

After their 4–2 home stand, the Phillies traveled to Atlanta to play the Braves. The series' first game lasted 13 innings, with the Phillies scoring five runs in the top of the 13th for a 6–1 win. Aaron Altherr, called up to replace Tony Gwynn Jr. (on the bereavement list after the death of his father, Hall of Famer Tony Gwynn), pinch-hit in the bottom of the 12th inning for his major-league debut. Kendrick started for the Phillies in game two of the series, "assertive[ly]" overcoming his previous first-inning struggles and allowing two runs in seven innings for a 5–2 win. The team swept the Braves, winning the final game of the series 10–5; Marlon Byrd had three RBIs and a home run, but backup catcher Wil Nieves (who had three hits in the game) hurt his leg rounding first base after hitting a ground rule double. The Phillies called up Cameron Rupp as backup catcher, demoting Altherr while Nieves recovered. They then traveled to St. Louis for a four-game series with the Cardinals. Buchanan started for the Phillies in the "best performance of his young career", pitching 7 2/3 innings and allowing one run in a 4–1 victory. Ryan Howard hit a home run, his 14th of the season, in his hometown. Brignac injured his ankle in a slide; he went on the DL, and Asche returned from the list. The next day, Burnett pitched the Phillies to their ninth win (5–1) in 11 games. They split the series, losing the last two games: a June 21 pitchers' duel between Hamels and Adam Wainwright (the 4–1 loss ended the Phillies' five-game winning streak) and a 5–3 loss the following day, with Kendrick giving up four runs in one inning.

The Phillies ended the month with two four-game home series, against the Marlins and Braves. In their first game against the Marlins, a 4–0 loss, they had six hits. The next night the Phillies won, 7–4; Asche and Byrd had two RBIs each and the bullpen was solid. In the third game, Domonic Brown failed to catch a fly ball to left field; three runs scored in a 3–2 loss. The Phillies won the series' final game, 5–3, with a 14th-inning walk-off home run by Chase Utley. After the game, Carlos Ruiz was placed on the disabled list with to a concussion sustained in the 11th inning. After the Phillies swept the Braves earlier in the month, the Braves returned the favor in the month's final series for both teams. In game one Kendrick returned to his old ways, allowing three runs in the first inning of a 4–2 loss. The next day, June 28, featured a day-night doubleheader. Hernandez started the afternoon game; two errors and six runs allowed by the bullpen led to a 10–3 loss. In the night game, the Phillies called up Sean O'Sullivan for his season debut and lost 5–1. After this game (the 81st of the 162-game season), the Phillies had a 36–45 record before losing the series' final game 3–2.

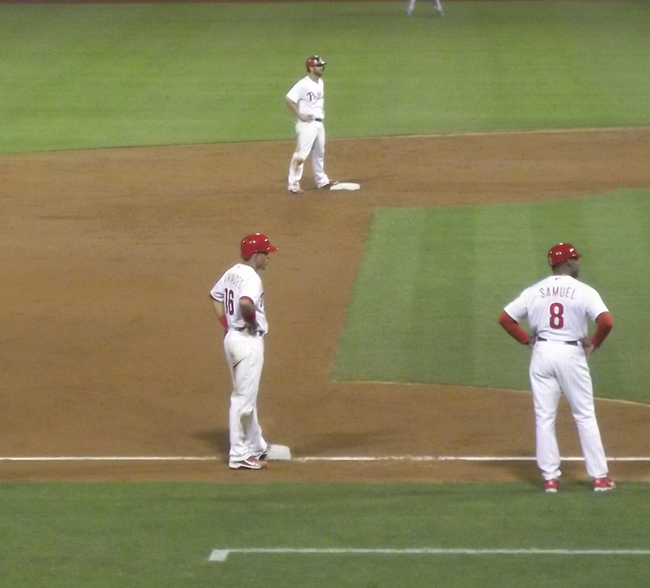
Reserve infielder Hernandez (standing on third base in the picture) was the team's leading hitter in June, with a .348 batting average.

In June César Hernández was the team's leading hitter, with a .348 batting average; Byrd led the team with eight home runs and 17 RBIs, and Ben Revere led the team with eight stolen bases. Ruiz and Mayberry struggled, with respective batting averages of .200 and .206 and combining for four home runs and 15 RBIs. Mario Hollands and Justin De Fratus did not allow an earned run all month (22 2/3 combined innings pitched), with Papelbon allowing one earned run and accumulating five saves. Hamels was the team's best starting pitcher; in six starts, he posted a 1.23 ERA and his opposing hitters batted .214. David Buchanan and Roberto Hernandez had ERAs of over 5.00 for the month, with a combined eight losses. The bullpen was fourth in the NL with a 2.63 ERA, and the starting rotation ranked 12th in the league with a 3.89 ERA. The Phillies' offense ranked 10th, with a .240 batting average; eighth in homes runs (22), and 10th in runs scored (104).

==== MLB draft ====
Due to their lackluster 2013 performance, the Phillies had the seventh first-round pick in the June 5–7 MLB draft. They selected Aaron Nola, a starting pitcher from Louisiana State University predicted by many to be one of the first draft picks to reach the major leagues, for fast-tracking through the Phillies' minor-league system. In the second round, they selected another pitcher – left-hander Matt Imhof, who played college ball with the Cal Poly Mustangs – and selected Aaron Brown, a pitcher-outfielder from Pepperdine, in the third round. The Phillies changed their organizational draft philosophy from drafting unpolished players with potential to selecting players ready to contribute to the big-league club, picking only one high-school player in the first 28 rounds. Michael Baumann wrote on the Crashburn Alley blog, "Given how high the Phillies drafted and how bad their farm system is at the top, I wanted them to get back into the game with one swing. This draft won't do that, but generally you want to get at least one good major league player out of every draft class, plus some odds and ends."

=== July ===
The good thing is we didn't get swept. We were able to get a win. Hopefully it'll propel us into some more. Getting swept is a bad feeling. Then having to get on a plane after that is even worse. We have to just keep grinding away.

— Tony Gwynn Jr., July 3, 2014, after the Phillies won the last of a three-game series against the Miami Marlins

The Phillies entered July with a 36–46 record (last in the NL East), and began a 10-game road trip. In the first series, they played the Miami Marlins; the first game was an 11-inning 5–4 loss, despite 10 strikeouts in six innings from A. J. Burnett and back-to-back home runs in the eighth by Marlon Byrd and Cody Asche. The next night the Phillies were shut out 5–0, their 11th shutout in 84 games (which Ryne Sandberg called "hard to believe"). During the game, Mario Hollands' 18-inning scoreless streak (Note: Streak of consecutive innings a pitcher has thrown in which they have not allowed a run.) ended when he gave up a two-run homer to Jarrod Saltalamacchia. The Phillies salvaged the final game of the series, scoring two runs in the ninth inning to defeat the Marlins 5–4.

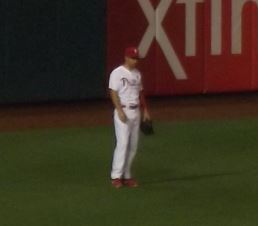
The Phillies called up Grady Sizemore on July 10 to provide outfield depth.

After Miami, the Phillies' next stop was PNC Park to play the Pittsburgh Pirates. The first game, on the Fourth of July in "picture-postcard holiday weather", was an 8–2 loss for the Phillies and their 11th in 14 games; the team never recovered from Roberto Hernandez' allowing four runs in the first inning. They lost 3–2 the next night, with the Pirates again scoring in the first inning to lead the entire game despite a late Phillies comeback attempt. The Phillies were swept the next day, losing 6–2 behind A. J. Burnett to Jeff Locke (whom Burnett mentored the previous season) and Russell Martin (Burnett's former catcher). Locke allowed one earned run in eight innings, and Martin drove in two runs. The Phillies began a four-game series against the Milwaukee Brewers, who had the best record in the NL, with the third-worst record in the league. The Phillies won the first game 3–2, with a first-inning home run by Chase Utley and good pitching from Cole Hamels, Ken Giles and Jonathan Papelbon. The next night they overcame a 5–1 first-inning deficit to beat the Brewers 9–7, thanks to three RBIs apiece from Utley and Domonic Brown. Hernandez had his best start of the season in the series' third game, allowing one run in eight innings on 84 pitches (unusual, since his pitch count was among the highest in the major leagues). The Phillies swept the Brewers the next afternoon; hitless in the first six innings, they scored seven runs in the eighth inning and two more in the ninth to win 9–1. David Buchanan, allowing one solo home run in seven innings, was the winning pitcher. It was the first Phillies sweep of a four-game series since 2011, when they defeated the Cincinnati Reds in late August and early September. After the game the team called up former all-star outfielder Grady Sizemore, whom they had signed to a minor-league contract in June, as an extra bat in their final series before the All-Star break.

The Phillies returned home to play the Washington Nationals before the break. With Sizemore leading their lineup for the first time, they won 6–2; Burnett allowed two runs in 7 2/3 innings and Jimmy Rollins hit two home runs. The team's five-game winning streak ended on July 12, when they lost to the Nationals 5–3 in 10 innings with 15 strikeouts. The Phillies ended the unofficial first half of their season (Note: In baseball the first and second halves of the season are marked by the All-Star game, which occurs shortly after the halfway point.) with another loss, bowing to the Nationals 10–3 in the series' rubber match.

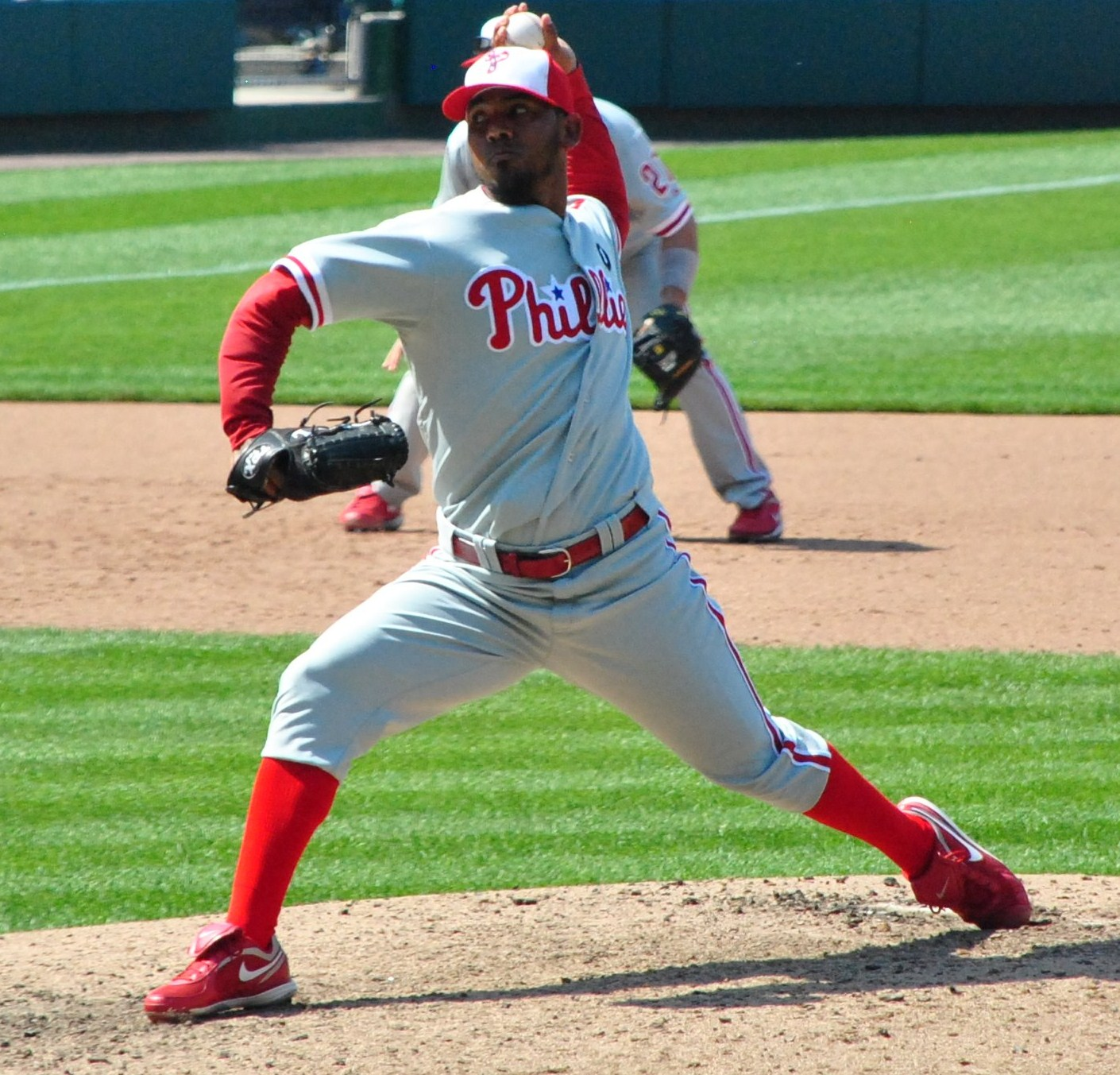
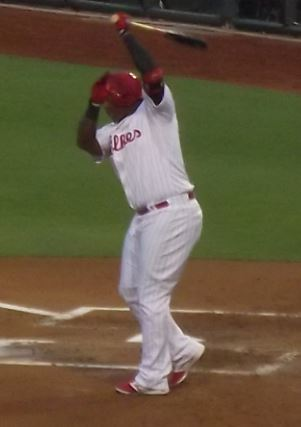
Among Phillies trade candidates were Antonio Bastardo (left) and Marlon Byrd

The second half of the season began on a sour note as the Phillies lost to the Braves 6–4, with Burnett giving up six runs in five innings. The next night (July 19) they edged the Braves 2–1 behind a "masterful" performance from Hamels, who struck out nine batters in seven innings and allowed one run in a pitchers' duel with Aaron Harang. The Phillies lost the rubber match 8–2, with the Braves scoring six runs in the first three innings, before returning home to face the San Francisco Giants in a four-game series. The team made a number of roster changes, recalling Cliff Lee, Wil Nieves and Reid Brignac from the disabled list, designating Tony Gwynn Jr. for assignment, optioning César Hernández to Triple-A and outrighting Koyie Hill from the roster. (Note: See Major League Baseball transactions for a full glossary of terms.) Lee started the first game of the series (a 7–4 loss despite 14 Phillies hits), allowing six runs and 12 hits in 5 2/3 innings. Although the next evening's 14-inning game showcased Phillies trade candidates (including Byrd and Antonio Bastardo) to the team scouts in attendance, they lost 9–6 when the Giants scored four runs on Jeff Manship in the 14th. Before the second half of the series the Phillies activated Carlos Ruiz from the DL, recalled Philippe Aumont to replace Cameron Rupp and Manship, placed John Mayberry Jr. on the DL and recalled Darin Ruf. In the series' third game, after Burnett's eight scoreless innings Papelbon gave up three runs in the ninth to lose 3–1. The Phillies salvaged the final game of the series (2–1) when Hamels struck out 10, allowed one run in eight innings, and Byrd and Utley drove in a run apiece. The home stand continued with three games against the Arizona Diamondbacks. Phillies outfielders Sizemore, Ruf and Brown powered the team to a 9–5 victory in the first game; Kendrick earned the win by pitching 5 2/3 innings, allowing three runs, and Sizemore recorded his 1,000th career hit. The next night was Lee's final opportunity to pitch before interested scouts before the trade deadline. He allowed three runs in five innings and the Phillies squandered a four-run lead, losing 10–6 in 10 innings. They won the rubber match the next day, when Roberto Hernandez pitched seven strong innings and Ryan Howard hit a two-run homer and scored the go-ahead run (ending a week in which he had been benched).

The team began a road trip against two division rivals: the Mets and the Nationals. In the first game of the Mets series, the Phillies lost 7–1 against Bartolo Colón; although Colón and A. J. Burnett (the Phillies' starter) were trade candidates, neither was traded. The next day Utley hit a grand slam and Hamels continued his dominance as the Phillies shut out the Mets 6–0, but the Mets routed the Phillies 11–2 in the series finale. The last game of the month opened a four-game series with the Nationals; the Phillies won 10–4 but Lee re-injured his elbow, probably ending his season.

The Phillies batted .248 in July (11th in the National League), hit 24 home runs (fourth in the NL) and scored 111 runs (third in the league). For the season to date they had a .243 batting average (10th in NL), 89 home runs (eighth in the league) and 426 runs (also eighth). Of those who played the entire month, Ben Revere led the team with a .359 batting average and seven stolen bases and his July success raised his season batting average to .301. Rollins' seven home runs in July led the team, as did Utley's 19 RBIs. Sizemore was a team leader at the plate, batting .328 with one home run and five RBIs in 16 games. Ryan Howard (.165, with two home runs) and Tony Gwynn Jr. (.111 before his July 31 release) struggled at the plate that month. Phillies pitchers ranked 13th in the NL in ERA (4.62) and 11th in WHIP (1.33) and BAA (.266). Their season ERA of 4.05 was 13th in the league. The team's best starting pitchers in July were Cole Hamels (4–1, with a 1.94 ERA in six starts) and Roberto Hernandez (2–1, with a 3.76 ERA in four starts). Ken Giles led the team in July ERA (0.66), Justin De Fratus in appearances (14), Hamels in innings pitched (41 2/3) and Jonathan Papelbon in BAA (.159) and WHIP (0.69). Mario Hollands struggled on the mound that month, with a 15.26 ERA in eight appearances, and Kyle Kendrick was 2–3 with a 6.94 ERA in six starts.

==== Trades and speculation ====
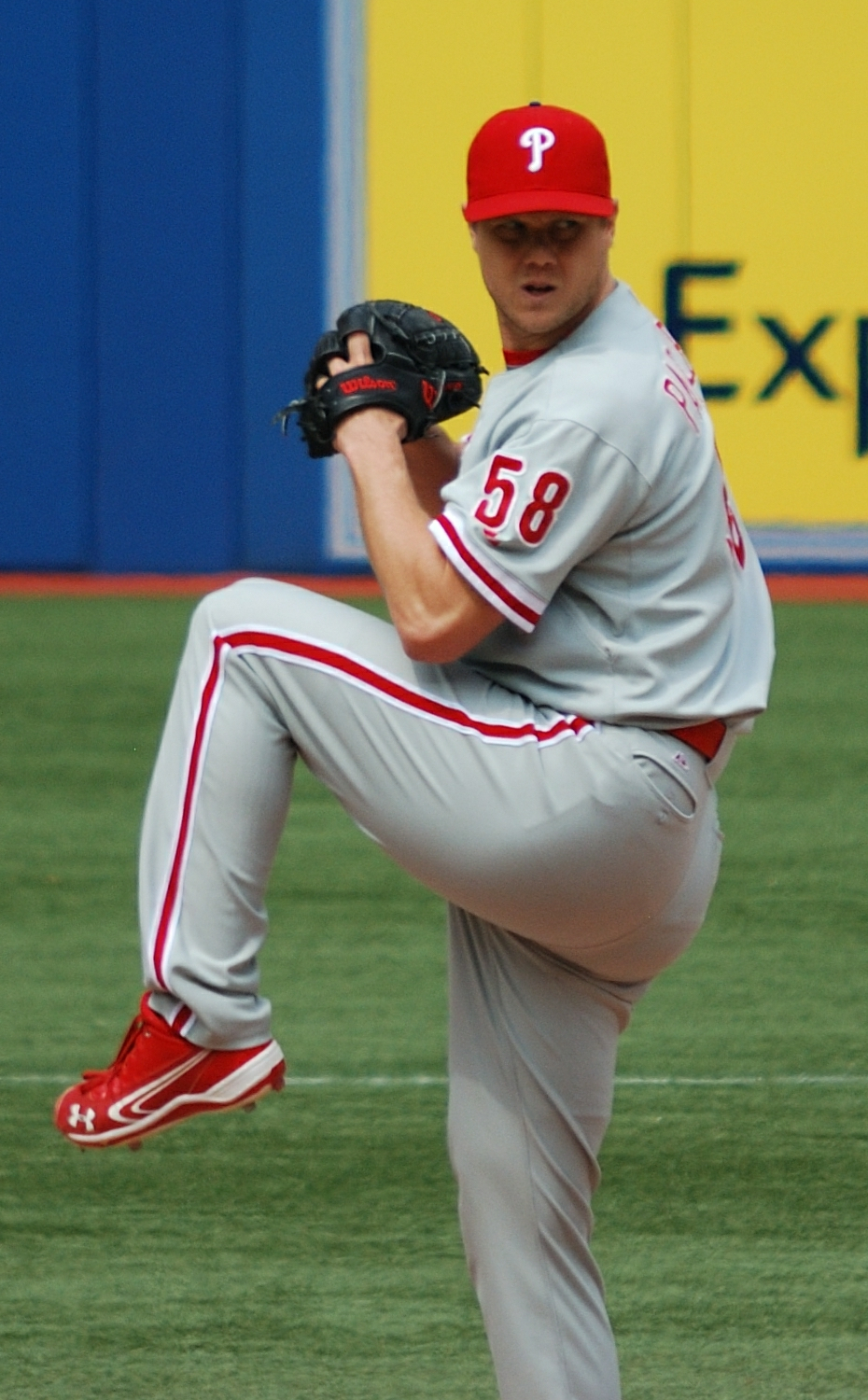
Reliever Jonathan Papelbon was a top trade candidate.

At the end of June the Phillies, with a 36–46 record, were at the bottom of the NL East and most observers agreed that they should be "sellers" rather than "buyers" (trade better players for future prospects, rather than trading future prospects for established players) by the July 31 trade deadline. However, the Phillies management (including general manager Ruben Amaro Jr. and president Dave Montgomery) did not think a fire sale would benefit the organization. According to Amaro:

"I can't blow this team up for five years and expect us to be (bad) for the next five or six years. I don't think that's the right way to go about our franchise. Our fans, our organization, I think we owe it to a lot of people, if we do have to go into a transition, it's going to be a shorter one than that. There's ways to do it. You have to make shrewd moves, make intelligent moves and try to continue to do that so that they drop off isn't long term. So if we have to go a step backward for a year or two to move forward then that's what we'll try to do."

— July 1, 2014 interview with The Philadelphia Daily News

Marlon Byrd and closer Jonathan Papelbon were top trade candidates because of other teams' needs and the fact that neither had no-trade clauses. Papelbon expressed a willingness to be traded, saying that it was "mind-boggling" to him that some players would prefer to remain on a losing team. According to a USA Today article:

"Amaro has been reluctant to break up a team that won five straight NL East titles from 2007–11, captured two pennants and won a World Series. But it's clear this overpriced group isn't going anywhere. The Phillies need prospects and don't have immediate help in the minor leagues. Trading some of the veterans now could help the team start fresh."

— "First-half failures leaves [sic] Phillies looking ahead", USA Today, July 14, 2014

Although Amaro announced Cole Hamels' availability, his high asking price hindered the possibility of a deal. Cliff Lee had been available, but after re-injuring his elbow (and probably missing the rest of the season) the possibility of a deal evaporated. The non-waiver trade deadline passed with no trades by the Phillies. Amaro was harshly criticized for holding onto Papelbon, Byrd, Hamels, Lee, A. J. Burnett and Antonio Bastardo. Although they did not make a deal before the non-waiver trading deadline, the team could still move a player on waivers; they did so, trading Roberto Hernandez to the Dodgers on August 7 for two players to be named later. The first named player was Jesmuel Valentin, son of former major leaguer José Valentín and a switch-hitting second baseman called a "breakout candidate" by a Baseball Prospectus writer. Observers generally considered Valentin a good fit for the Phillies, since the team did not give up much in return. Several weeks later the Phillies acquired their second named player, right-handed pitcher Victor Arano, to complete the trade. Arano, rated the Dodgers' 14th-best prospect by MLB.com, had a 94-mile-per-hour (151 km/h) fastball and a slider in his repertoire. According to a Dodgers source, he had potential as a back-of-the-rotation starter. Shortly before the September 1 waiver deadline, the Phillies traded "perennial fourth outfielder" John Mayberry Jr. to the Toronto Blue Jays for third-base prospect Gustavo Pierre]

=== August ===
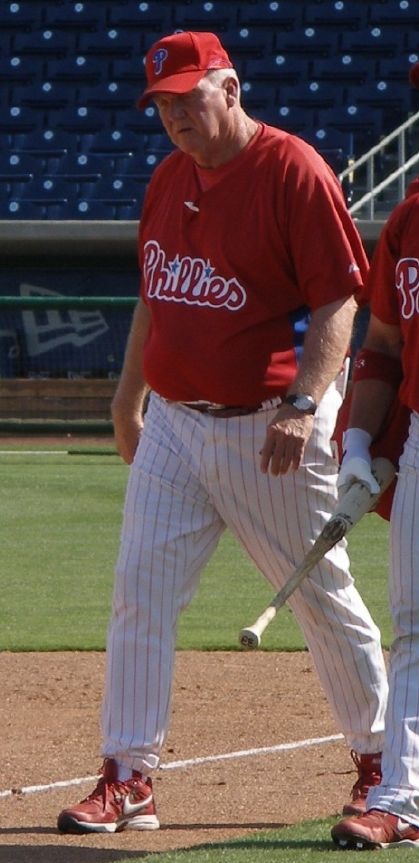
On August 9, the Phillies placed all-time winning manager Charlie Manuel on their Wall of Fame.

The Phillies began August by placing Cliff Lee on the disabled list, replacing him on the roster with Cesar Jimenez; however, David Buchanan was eventually expected to take Lee's place in the starting rotation. They continued their series with the Washington Nationals, winning 2–1 with another strong outing from Roberto Hernandez and a home run by Marlon Byrd. After wins in the series' first two games, starting pitcher A. J. Burnett was ejected in the second inning of the third game for arguing with home plate umpire Chris Guccione about the strike zone. Burnett's first ejection in his 16-season career sparked 11 runs by the Nationals, who shut out the Phillies. The team also lost the rubber match 4–0 the following day, when Cole Hamels had no run support in a pitchers' duel with Stephen Strasburg.

After a day off the Phillies hosted the Houston Astros, whose 47–65 record was two games worse than theirs. The series opener was another pitchers' duel, with Kyle Kendrick and Dallas Keuchel allowing one run apiece in seven innings. Seven Phillies relievers then combined for eight shutout innings before they won, 2–1, in the bottom of the 15th with a Ryan Howard walk-off RBI single to score Grady Sizemore. Howard also hit a home run in the game's second inning. The Phillies' success continued in their next game, when Buchanan (starting for Lee) had a quality start and his first career RBI at the plate in a 10–3 victory over the Astros. In the Phillies' organization, first-round draft pick Aaron Nola was promoted to the Reading Fightin' Phils (the team's Double-A affiliate) and had a "solid" first outing. Sean O'Sullivan was called up in place of the recently traded Roberto Hernandez. Although O'Sullivan gave up five runs (including three home runs) in six innings, the Phillies scored five runs in the eighth inning – including a grand slam by Howard – to win 6–5 and sweep the Astros. The team then opened a four-game series with the Mets; in game one, the Phillies lost 5–4 after scoring three runs in the ninth inning. Hamels' lack of run support continued in game two; although he allowed only one run in seven innings, Antonio Bastardo gave up an RBI single to Lucas Duda for a 2–1 loss. That night (August 9), the Phillies placed former manager Charlie Manuel on their Wall of Fame. The next afternoon Howard hit a walk-off single, capping a rally from a five-run deficit and giving Ken Giles his first career win.

Shortly after the Phillies claimed Jerome Williams off waivers and designated O'Sullivan for assignment, Williams started in the opener of a two-game series with the Angels in Los Angeles. Williams threw five shutout innings before giving up two runs in the sixth; Bastardo then gave up five more, and the Angels won 7–2. The Phillies also lost the second game, 4–3, as A. J. Burnett's inconsistency continued. The second (and final) series of the road trip pitted the Phillies against the San Francisco Giants. Hamels started game one, allowing a three-run homer in the fourth inning to give the Giants a 3–0 lead. The Phillies rallied, with a Marlon Byrd home run in the fifth inning and a two-run homer by Cody Asche to tie the game in the eighth. In the tenth, Chase Utley was hit by a pitch with the bases loaded (scoring one run) and Howard added a sacrifice fly to give the Phillies a 5–3 victory and Papelbon a save. In the second game, the Phillies jumped to a 5–1 lead before a sixth-inning infield error fueled a Giants rally. When Sandberg came out to remove Kendrick from the game, the pitcher stormed off the field in disgust; the Giants won, 6–5. The Phillies also lost the series' rubber match, 5–2; despite a quality start from Buchanan and Asche's three hits, the Giants had strong hitting by Michael Morse and Brandon Crawford.

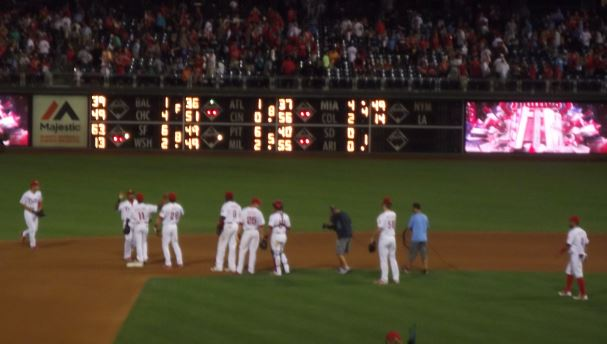
The Phillies celebrate a victory on August 22, 2014.

The Phillies returned home to face the Seattle Mariners in a three-game series, and two unlikely players were key contributors in the team's win in the series opener: Jerome Williams allowed one run in seven innings and Andrés Blanco hit a three-run homer (his first home run in three years) to defeat the Mariners, 4–1. The next night, Burnett's struggles during the second half of the season continued as he gave up five runs in 7 2/3 innings for a 5–2 loss. The Phillies then edged the Mariners 4–3, with help from Wil Nieves (three hits) and the bullpen (Jake Diekman, Giles and Papelbon pitched four scoreless innings, striking out nine). The Phillies' home stand continued with a three-game series against the St. Louis Cardinals. Kendrick started game one; despite his continued first-inning struggles (he allowed three runs in the first, raising his season first-inning ERA to 9.69), the Phillies batted around in the third to take a 5–4 lead and strong pitching from both teams enabled them to hang on for the win. The next night, mental errors by the Phillies cost them the game 6–5 in 12 innings. Williams started the series' rubber match, continuing his effectiveness in a 7–1 win with eight strong innings and driving in a run with a suicide squeeze. The series win was the Phillies' first consecutive-series victory since April, a 33-series drought and their longest since 1996–1997.

The final series of the home stand featured the Washington Nationals. After Burnett's poor pitching led some to suggest that he would retire after the season, he dominated game one by striking out 12 batters and allowing one run in seven innings for a 3–2 win. The Phillies' success continued the next day, when Sandberg started Freddy Galvis and Darin Ruf in place of Chase Utley and Ryan Howard. Ruf and Galvis combined for four hits, two runs and three RBIs in a 4–3 victory. The team swept the series when Sizemore entered the game as a pinch hitter in the sixth inning, and his two-run homer helped the Phillies to an 8–4 final score.

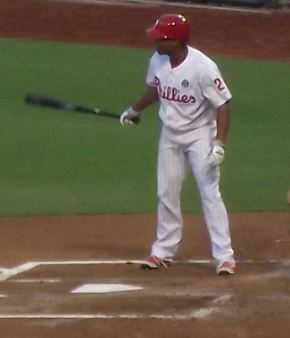
Ben Revere was among the team's offensive leaders in August.

After three series victories, the Phillies went to Citi Field for a three-game series with the Mets. Although a game-one win would have lifted them out of last place in their division for the first time since June, they lost 4–1 on a fielding error by Sizemore (who said he "let the team down"). The Phillies evened the series with Williams' quality start in the second game, winning 7–2, but their series-victory streak ended when they lost the final game 6–5 (A. J. Burnett's 15th loss of the season).

Although the Phillies won 14 games and lost 13 in August, their first winning month since March (when they were 1–0), Ruben Amaro said that the team needed "significant" changes to contend in the near future. They were in the middle of the NL in August, ranking eighth in batting average (.251), seventh in runs scored (107) and tied for fifth place in home runs (23). Among the team's offensive leaders that month were Ruf and Revere, who batted .370 and .311; Byrd, who led the team with five home runs; Howard, who led with 23 RBIs and Rollins, who led with 13 walks. Ruiz struggled at the plate in August, batting .217 with two home runs and seven RBIs. The difference in quality between starting and relief pitching persisted; in August, starting pitchers had a 3.76 ERA (10th in the NL) and the bullpen ERA was 2.60 (third in the league). The team's 3.26 August ERA was fifth in the NL. Relievers Papelbon, Diekman and Giles had a strong month, with each below a 2.00 ERA in at least 12 appearances, and Antonio Bastardo was the only Phillies reliever pitching at least 10 games with an ERA above 3.00. Jerome Williams led the starting staff with three wins and a 2.03 ERA in 26 2/3 innings pitched, but A. J. Burnett's struggles continued: a 1–5 record, with a 5.50 ERA in six starts.

=== September ===
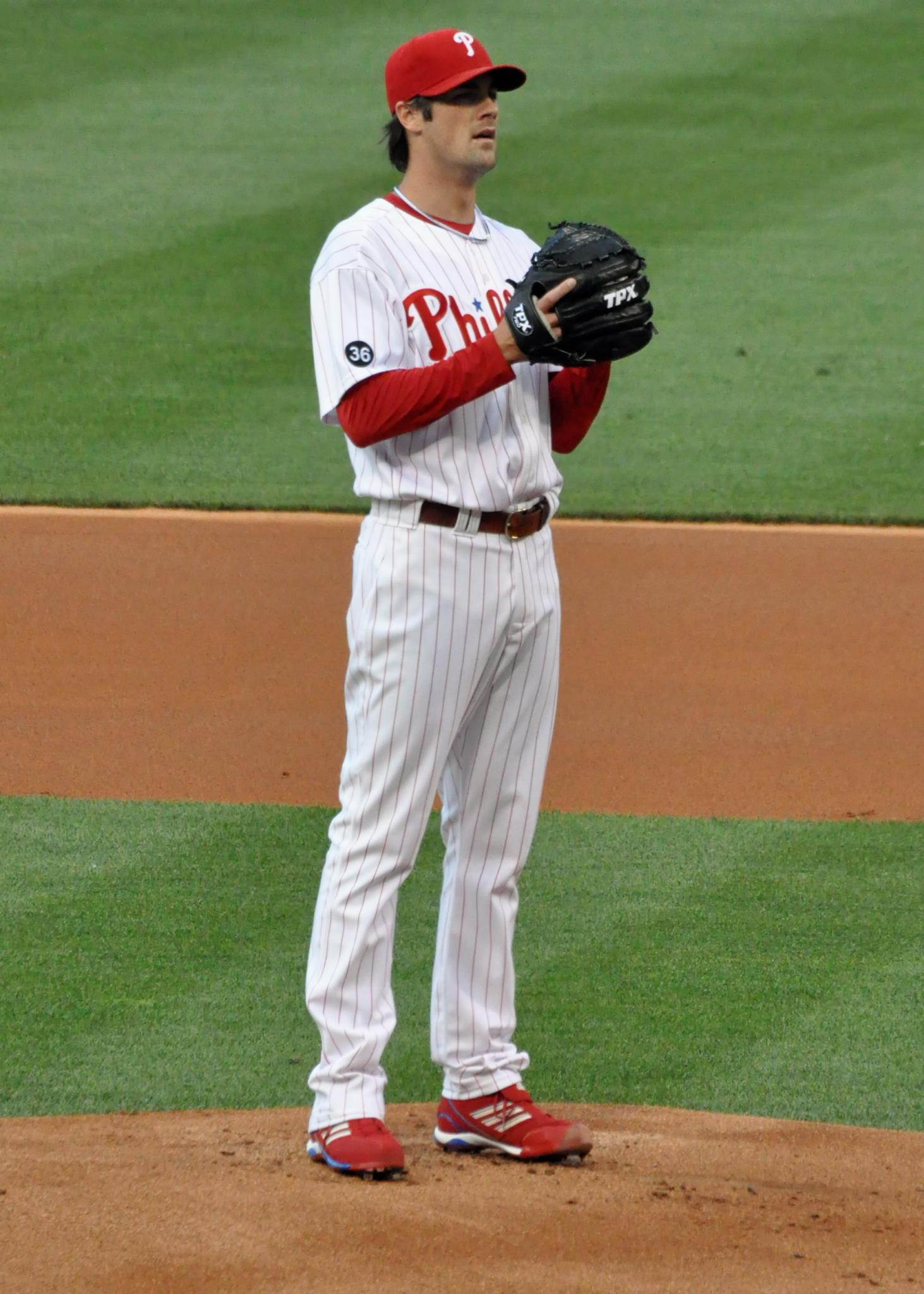
Cole Hamels started the game, pitching six innings and walking five batters;

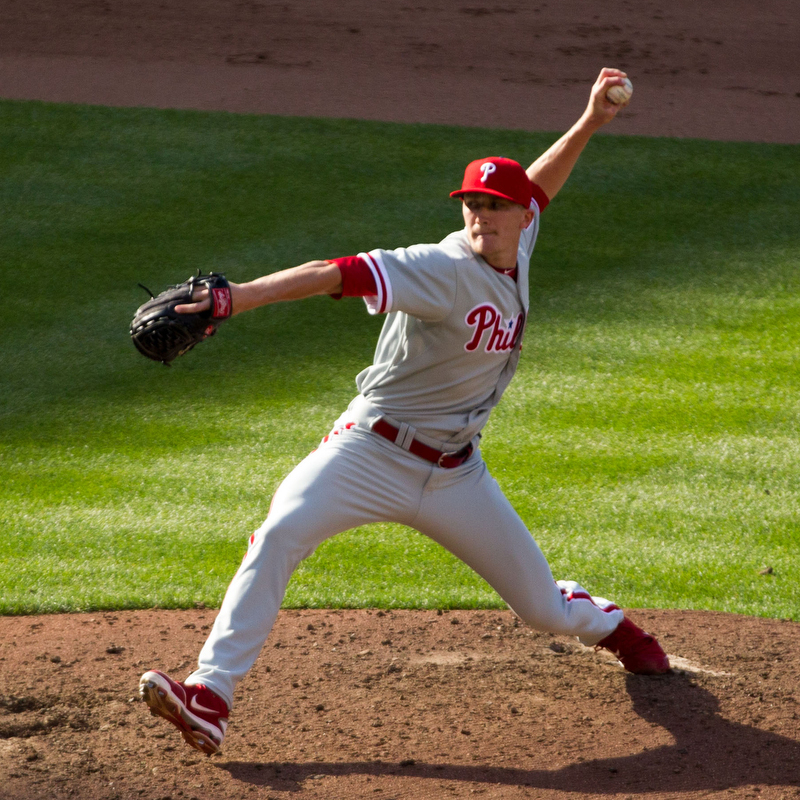
Jake Diekman pitched a perfect seventh inning, striking out two batters;

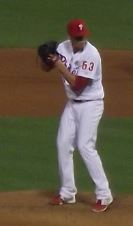
Ken Giles struck out all three batters he faced in the eighth,

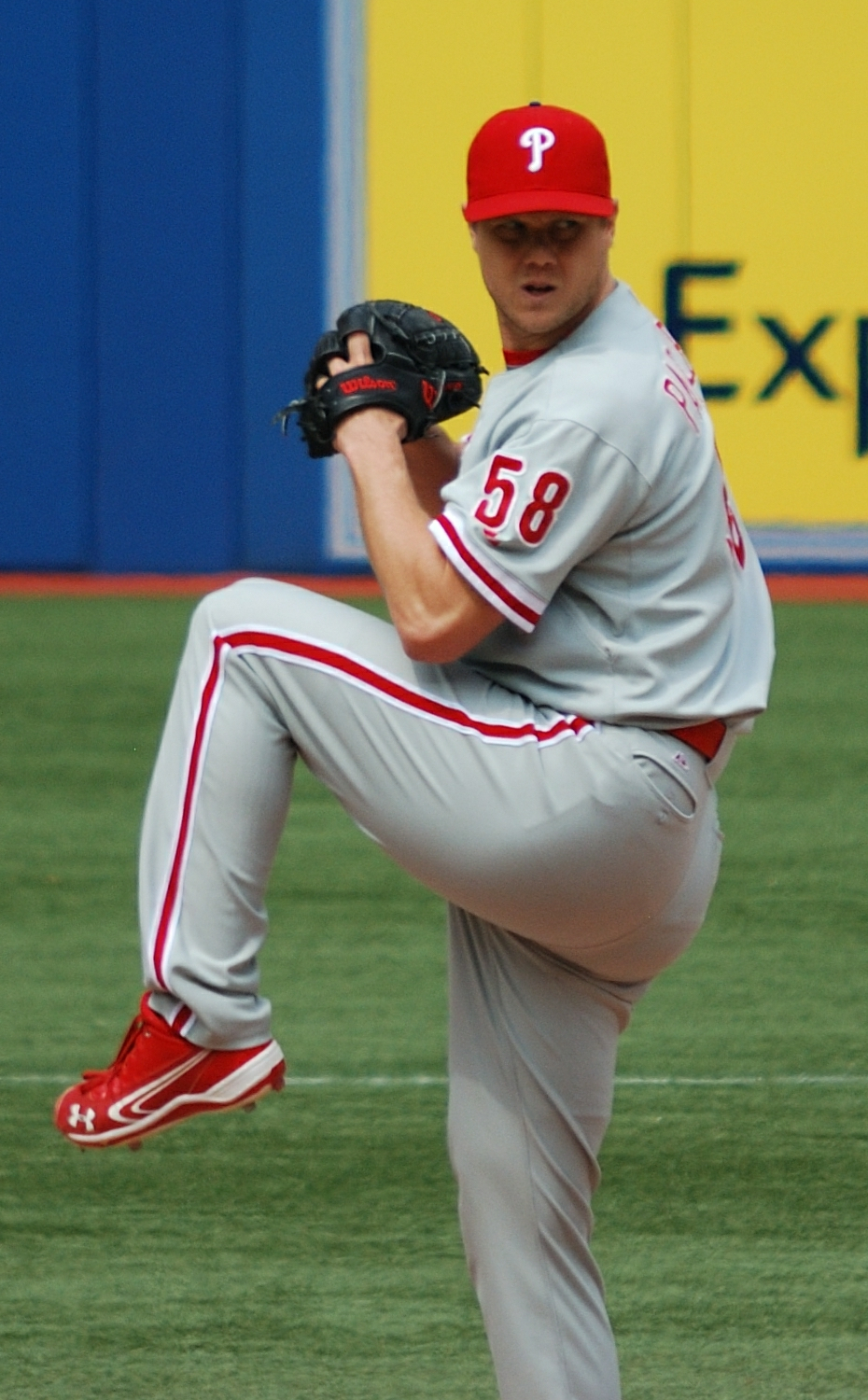
before Jonathan Papelbon finished the no-hitter with a perfect ninth inning.

Four Phillies pitchers combined for a no-hitter against the Atlanta Braves on September 1, 2014.

The Phillies began September in Atlanta with a three-game series against the Braves on a high note: Cole Hamels, Jake Diekman, Ken Giles and Jonathan Papelbon combined to pitch a no-hitter, the 11th combined no-hitter in major-league history, for a 7–0 victory. The next day "Atlanta's offense remained in desultory mode" and Kyle Kendrick was helped by double plays to a Phillies 4–0 win, extending the Braves' scoreless streak to 24 innings. In the series' final game, Phillies reliever Mario Hollands left the game with a season-ending injury and Miguel Alfredo González made his major-league debut in a 7–4 loss. After a day off, the road trip continued with a three-game series against the Washington Nationals. In game one the Phillies came back twice from five-run deficits to beat the Nationals 9–8 in 11 innings, with Ben Revere hitting his second career home run. The next day was another pitchers' duel; A. J. Burnett had his second consecutive solid start, allowing one run in seven innings for a 3–1 win. According to Ryne Sandberg, Burnett had the "best movement he's had on the ball this year". For the second straight series, the Phillies won the first two games but failed to sweep. Starter Cole Hamels committed a balk, allowing a runner to advance to third base and score on a sacrifice fly for a 3–2 loss.

The Phillies then returned home for seven games against the Pirates and Marlins. In the first Pirates game, Jimmy Rollins tripled and scored in the fourth inning before leaving the game with a hamstring injury and the Phillies lost 6–4. The Phillies won the second game, 4–3 (their lone victory of the four-game series), with the help of Freddy Galvis; Galvis, batting eighth in the order, hit a home run and scored three runs. In his first start against the Phillies since he was traded, Pittsburgh starter Vance Worley then earned a 6–3 win for the Pirates. The Phillies scored one run in the series' conclusion, a 4–1 loss.

Their home stand continued with a three-game series against the Marlins. Batting second (a career first) in the first game, Cody Asche hit his first career walk-off hit: a home run in the tenth inning for a 3–1 victory. In the next game, possibly Kyle Kendrick's final start with the Phillies at Citizens Bank Park (since his contract expired at the end of the season), he pitched 6 1/3 innings and allowed one run in the Phillies' 2–1 win. They failed to sweep, however, when Papelbon's blown save gave the Marlins a 5–4 win in the series' final game.

There has not been much to smile about lately for the Phillies as they approach the end of their second straight losing season. Saturday's 3-0 win over the A's, however, was peppered with bright spots. Ken Giles, the team's possible closer of the future, earned his first career save on his 24th birthday. Jerome Williams made baseball history, becoming the first pitcher to earn three wins against the same opponent as a member of three different teams. And Freddy Galvis continued to make the most of his time as the starting shortstop, hitting a two-run homer to break a scoreless tie in the seventh.

— Aaron Leibowitz, "Galvis helps Williams earn historic 'W' over A's". MLB.com, September 20, 2014.

The Phillies then headed to San Diego to face the Padres in a four-game series, managing two hits in the opener to spoil Jerome Williams' solid start with a 1–0 loss. Although the next night a 5–4 loss (their 82nd) clinched a losing season, they won game three 5–2 behind a "stellar outing" by Hamels. The Phillies then lost the fourth game of the series, 7–3, before continuing their West Coast trip with a series against the Oakland Athletics. Despite a good start from David Buchanan in the series' opener, the Phillies scored once in a 3–1 loss. They won the second 3–0, a game "peppered" with bright spots, before losing the 10-inning rubber match of the series 8–6.

The team flew to Miami for the season's penultimate series. Despite Hamels' quality start in game one, the Phillies were shut out 2–0. In the second game Kendrick made possibly his final start in a Phillies uniform a fine overall effort, allowing one run in seven innings of a 2–1 win and going three-for-three at the plate (doubling and driving in a run). The Phillies lost the series, with the bullpen failing to hold the lead in a third-game 6–4 loss.

Their final series of the season, at home, was three games with the Braves. The Phillies won the opener with a strong start by Williams, who ended his Phillies season with a 2.83 ERA. Although Burnett pitched decently in game two, the Braves won 4–2. The Phillies' season ended when Hamels, despite a quality start, was on the losing end of a 2–1 final score.

September's offense sputtered, with a .228 batting average, 3.31 runs per game and a .615 on-base plus slugging percentage (13th, 14th and 14th, respectively, of the 15 NL teams). Pitching was better, with the starters' 3.27 cumulative ERA fourth in the NL and the relievers' 3.09 cumulative ERA fifth in the league. Cesar Hernandez led the team with a .333 batting average in 14 games, and Freddy Galvis and Ryan Howard hit three home runs apiece. Ben Revere's 13 RBIs and nine stolen bases were the Phillies' September best. Carlos Ruiz struggled, batting .193 despite two home runs and eight RBIs. Justin De Fratus and Ken Giles led the bullpen with ERAs of 0.00 and 0.82 in nine and eleven games, respectively. Cole Hamels was the Phillies' best starting pitcher that month, with a 2–3 record despite a 1.96 ERA.

== Season standings ==
=== National League East ===
NL East
Team	W	L	Pct.	GB	Home	Road
Washington Nationals	96	66	.593	—	51‍–‍30	45‍–‍36
Atlanta Braves	79	83	.488	17	42‍–‍39	37‍–‍44
New York Mets	79	83	.488	17	40‍–‍41	39‍–‍42
Miami Marlins	77	85	.475	19	42‍–‍39	35‍–‍46
Philadelphia Phillies	73	89	.451	23	37‍–‍44	36‍–‍45

=== National League Wild Card ===
Division leaders
Team	W	L	Pct.
Washington Nationals	96	66	.593
Los Angeles Dodgers	94	68	.580
St. Louis Cardinals	90	72	.556

Wild Card teams (Top 2 teams qualify for postseason)
Team	W	L	Pct.	GB
Pittsburgh Pirates	88	74	.543	—
San Francisco Giants	88	74	.543	—
Milwaukee Brewers	82	80	.506	6
New York Mets	79	83	.488	9
Atlanta Braves	79	83	.488	9
Miami Marlins	77	85	.475	11
San Diego Padres	77	85	.475	11
Cincinnati Reds	76	86	.469	12
Philadelphia Phillies	73	89	.451	15
Chicago Cubs	73	89	.451	15
Colorado Rockies	66	96	.407	22
Arizona Diamondbacks	64	98	.395	24

=== Game log ===
2014 game log (Overall Record: 73–89)
March & April (13–13)

#	Date	Opponent	Score	Win	Loss	Save	Attendance	Record
1	March 31	@ Rangers	14–10	**Cliff Lee** (1–0)	Pedro Figueroa (0–1)	None	49,031	1–0
2	April 1	@ Rangers	2–3	Joakim Soria (1–0)	**Mario Hollands** (0–1)	None	29,530	1–1
3	April 2	@ Rangers	3–4	Seth Rosin (1–0)	**Jonathan Papelbon** (0–1)	None	28,282	1–2
4	April 4	@ Cubs	7–2	**Roberto Hernández** (1–0)	Travis Wood (0–1)	None	38,283	2–2
5	April 5	@ Cubs	2–0	**Cliff Lee** (2–0)	Jeff Samardzija (0–1)	**Jonathan Papelbon** (1)	30,651	3–2
6	April 6	@ Cubs	3–8	Carlos Villanueva (1–2)	**A. J. Burnett** (0–1)	None	26,712	3–3
–	April 7	Brewers	Postponed (probability of rain); Makeup: April 8					
7	April 8	Brewers	4–10	Kyle Lohse (1–1)	**Kyle Kendrick** (0–1)	None	45,061	3–4
8	April 9	Brewers	4–9	Tyler Thornburg (2–0)	**Antonio Bastardo** (0–1)	None	31,168	3–5
9	April 10	Brewers	2–6	Marco Estrada (1–0)	**Cliff Lee** (2–1)	None	25,492	3–6
10	April 11	Marlins	6–3	**Jake Diekman** (1–0)	José Fernández (2–1)	**Jonathan Papelbon** (2)	22,283	4–6
11	April 12	Marlins	5–4 (10)	**B. J. Rosenberg** (1–0)	Dan Jennings (0–1)	None	27,760	5–6
12	April 13	Marlins	4–3	**Antonio Bastardo** (1–1)	Mike Dunn (0–1)	**Jonathan Papelbon** (3)	34,272	6–6
13	April 14	Braves	6–9	Luis Avilán (3–1)	**Jake Diekman** (1–1)	David Carpenter (1)	26,516	6–7
–	April 15	Braves	Postponed (rain); Makeup: June 28 as a day-night double-header					
14	April 16	Braves	0–1	Julio Teherán (2–1)	**Cliff Lee** (2–2)	None	23,382	6–8
15	April 17	Braves	1–0	**Antonio Bastardo** (2–1)	Alex Wood (2–2)	**Jonathan Papelbon** (4)	25,750	7–8
16	April 18	@ Rockies	1–12	Tyler Chatwood (1–0)	**Jonathan Pettibone** (0–1)	None	35,705	7–9
17	April 19	@ Rockies	1–3	Jordan Lyles (3–0)	**Kyle Kendrick** (0–2)	LaTroy Hawkins (5)	31,352	7–10
18	April 20	@ Rockies	10–9	**Jake Diekman** (2–1)	Matt Belisle (0–2)	**Jonathan Papelbon** (5)	33,563	8–10
19	April 21	@ Dodgers	7–0	**Cliff Lee** (3–2)	Paul Maholm (0–2)	None	37,715	9–10
20	April 22	@ Dodgers	3–2 (10)	**Antonio Bastardo** (3–1)	J. P. Howell (1–2)	**Jonathan Papelbon** (6)	44,826	10–10
21	April 23	@ Dodgers	2–5	Zack Greinke (4–0)	**Cole Hamels** (0–1)	Kenley Jansen (8)	40,776	10–11
22	April 24	@ Dodgers	7–3	**Mike Adams** (1–0)	Brian Wilson (0–2)	None	51,699	11–11
23	April 25	@ Diamondbacks	4–5	Josh Collmenter (1–2)	**Roberto Hernández** (1–1)	Addison Reed (6)	28,168	11–12
24	April 26	@ Diamondbacks	6–5	**Jeff Manship** (1–0)	Trevor Cahill (1–5)	**Jonathan Papelbon** (7)	35,462	12–12
25	April 27	@ Diamondbacks	2–0	**A. J. Burnett** (1–1)	Brandon McCarthy (0–5)	**Jonathan Papelbon** (8)	30,022	13–12
26	April 29	Mets	1–6	Jon Niese (2–2)	**Cole Hamels** (0–2)	None	28,189	13–13
–	April 30	Mets	Postponed (rain); Makeup: June 2					

May (11–16)

#	Date	Opponent	Score	Win	Loss	Save	Attendance	Record
27	May 2	Nationals	3–5	Jerry Blevins (2–1)	**Mike Adams** (1–1)	Rafael Soriano (6)	31,945	13–14
28	May 3	Nationals	7–2	**A. J. Burnett** (2–1)	Tanner Roark (2–1)	None	33,441	14–14
29	May 4	Nationals	1–0	**Roberto Hernández** (2–1)	Gio González (3–2)	**Jonathan Papelbon** (9)	37,490	15–14
30	May 5	Blue Jays	0–3	J. A. Happ (1–0)	**Kyle Kendrick** (0–3)	Brett Cecil (2)	25,275	15–15
31	May 6	Blue Jays	5–6 (10)	Marcus Stroman (1–0)	**Antonio Bastardo** (3–2)	Aaron Loup (2)	26,057	15–16
32	May 7	@ Blue Jays	0–10	Mark Buehrle (6–1)	**Cliff Lee** (3–3)	None	16,446	15–17
33	May 8	@ Blue Jays	6–12	R. A. Dickey (3–3)	**A. J. Burnett** (2–2)	None	18,158	15–18
34	May 9	@ Mets	3–2 (11)	**Mario Hollands** (1–1)	Carlos Torres (2–2)	**Jonathan Papelbon** (10)	30,036	16–18
35	May 10	@ Mets	5–4	**Mike Adams** (2–1)	Kyle Farnsworth (0–3)	**Jonathan Papelbon** (11)	29,170	17–18
36	May 11	@ Mets	4–5 (11)	Scott Rice (1–1)	**Jeff Manship** (1–1)	None	28,926	17–19
37	May 13	Angels	3–4	Matt Shoemaker (1–1)	**Cliff Lee** (3–4)	Ernesto Frieri (5)	41,959	17–20
38	May 14	Angels	0–3	Garrett Richards (4–0)	**A. J. Burnett** (2–3)	Joe Smith (5)	33,308	17–21
39	May 16	Reds	0–3	Alfredo Simón (5–2)	**Kyle Kendrick** (0–4)	Aroldis Chapman (2)	27,316	17–22
40	May 17	Reds	12–1	**Cole Hamels** (1–2)	Homer Bailey (3–3)	None	30,075	18–22
41	May 18	Reds	8–3	**Cliff Lee** (4–4)	Tony Cingrani (2–3)	None	36,096	19–22
42	May 20	@ Marlins	6–5	**A. J. Burnett** (3–3)	Anthony DeSclafani (1–1)	**Jonathan Papelbon** (12)	18,699	20–22
43	May 21	@ Marlins	5–14	Nathan Eovaldi (3–2)	**Kyle Kendrick** (0–5)	None	18,257	20–23
44	May 22	@ Marlins	3–4	Steve Cishek (4–1)	**Jake Diekman** (2–2)	None	25,507	20–24
45	May 23	Dodgers	0–2	Clayton Kershaw (3–1)	**Roberto Hernández** (2–2)	Kenley Jansen (14)	27,254	20–25
46	May 24	Dodgers	5–3	**David Buchanan** (1–0)	Dan Haren (5–3)	**Jonathan Papelbon** (13)	32,287	21–25
47	May 25	Dodgers	0–6	Josh Beckett (3–1)	**A. J. Burnett** (3–4)	None	36,141	21–26
48	May 26	Rockies	9–0	**Kyle Kendrick** (1–5)	Jhoulys Chacín (0–4)	None	27,289	22–26
49	May 27	Rockies	2–6	Jorge de la Rosa (6–3)	**Cole Hamels** (1–3)	None	23,159	22–27
50	May 28	Rockies	6–3	**Jonathan Papelbon** (1–1)	LaTroy Hawkins (2–1)	None	23,691	23–27
51	May 29	Mets	1–4	Zack Wheeler (2–5)	**David Buchanan** (1–1)	Jenrry Mejía (5)	26,668	23–28
52	May 30	Mets	6–5 (14)	**Justin De Fratus** (1–0)	Jenrry Mejía (4–2)	None	30,236	24–28
53	May 31	Mets	4–5 (14)	Buddy Carlyle (1–0)	**Antonio Bastardo** (3–3)	Carlos Torres (2)	37,516	24–29

June (12–17)

#	Date	Opponent	Score	Win	Loss	Save	Attendance	Record
54	June 1	Mets	3–4 (11)	Josh Edgin (1–0)	**Phillippe Aumont** (0–1)	Jenrry Mejía (6)	36,039	24–30
55	June 2	Mets	2–11	Bartolo Colón (5–5)	**Roberto Hernández** (2–3)	None	26,302	24–31
56	June 3	@ Nationals	0–7	Jordan Zimmermann (4–2)	**David Buchanan** (1–2)	None	25,291	24–32
57	June 4	@ Nationals	4–8	Stephen Strasburg (5–4)	**A. J. Burnett** (3–5)	None	33,614	24–33
58	June 5	@ Nationals	2–4	Doug Fister (4–1)	**Kyle Kendrick** (1–6)	Rafael Soriano (12)	33,016	24–34
59	June 6	@ Reds	8–0	**Cole Hamels** (2–3)	Johnny Cueto (5–5)	None	38,331	25–34
60	June 7	@ Reds	5–6	Alfredo Simón (8–3)	**Roberto Hernández** (2–4)	Aroldis Chapman (8)	36,347	25–35
61	June 8	@ Reds	1–4	Homer Bailey (7–3)	**David Buchanan** (1–3)	Aroldis Chapman (9)	30,222	25–36
62	June 10	Padres	5–2	**A. J. Burnett** (4–5)	Ian Kennedy (5–7)	**Jonathan Papelbon** (14)	31,037	26–36
63	June 11	Padres	3–0	**Jonathan Papelbon** (2–1)	Nick Vincent (0–2)	None	25,398	27–36
64	June 12	Padres	7–3	**Kyle Kendrick** (2–6)	Eric Stults (2–8)	None	29,372	28–36
65	June 13	Cubs	1–2	Jake Arrieta (2–1)	**Roberto Hernández** (2–5)	Neil Ramirez (2)	26,154	28–37
66	June 14	Cubs	7–4	**David Buchanan** (2–3)	Edwin Jackson (4–7)	**Jonathan Papelbon** (15)	31,524	29–37
67	June 15	Cubs	0–3	Travis Wood (7–5)	**A. J. Burnett** (4–6)	Neil Ramirez (3)	41,238	29–38
68	June 16	@ Braves	6–1 (13)	**Antonio Bastardo** (4–3)	David Hale (2–2)	None	23,900	30–38
69	June 17	@ Braves	5–2	**Kyle Kendrick** (3–6)	Ervin Santana (5–4)	**Jonathan Papelbon** (16)	41,631	31–38
70	June 18	@ Braves	10–5	**Roberto Hernández** (3–5)	Aaron Harang (5–6)	None	28,500	32–38
71	June 19	@ Cardinals	4–1	**David Buchanan** (3–3)	Shelby Miller (7–6)	**Jonathan Papelbon** (17)	42,106	33–38
72	June 20	@ Cardinals	5–1	**A. J. Burnett** (5–6)	Jaime García (3–1)	None	44,061	34–38
73	June 21	@ Cardinals	1–4	Adam Wainwright (10–3)	**Cole Hamels** (2–4)	Trevor Rosenthal (21)	44,789	34–39
74	June 22	@ Cardinals	3–5	Carlos Martínez (1–3)	**Kyle Kendrick** (3–7)	Trevor Rosenthal (22)	43,484	34–40
75	June 23	Marlins	0–4	Nathan Eovaldi (5–3)	**Roberto Hernández** (3–6)	None	32,161	34–41
76	June 24	Marlins	7–4	**David Buchanan** (4–3)	Andrew Heaney (0–2)	**Jonathan Papelbon** (18)	24,860	35–41
77	June 25	Marlins	2–3	Henderson Álvarez (5–3)	**A. J. Burnett** (5–7)	Steve Cishek (18)	23,360	35–42
78	June 26	Marlins	5–3 (14)	**Justin De Fratus** (2–0)	Chris Hatcher (0–1)	None	34,168	36–42
79	June 27	Braves	2–4	Julio Teherán (7–5)	**Kyle Kendrick** (3–8)	Craig Kimbrel (23)	38,100	36–43
80	June 28 (1)	Braves	3–10	Ervin Santana (6–5)	**Roberto Hernández** (3–7)	None	28,845	36–44
81	June 28 (2)	Braves	1–5	David Hale (3–2)	**Sean O'Sullivan** (0–1)	None	30,845	36–45
82	June 29	Braves	2–3	Aaron Harang (7–6)	**David Buchanan** (4–4)	Craig Kimbrel (24)	33,215	36–46

July (12–15)

#	Date	Opponent	Score	Win	Loss	Save	Attendance	Record
83	July 1	@ Marlins	4–5 (11)	Bryan Morris (6–0)	**Justin De Fratus** (2–1)	None	18,518	36–47
84	July 2	@ Marlins	0–5	Tom Koehler (6–6)	**Cole Hamels** (2–5)	None	20,084	36–48
85	July 3	@ Marlins	5–4	**Jake Diekman** (3–2)	Steve Cishek (4–4)	**Jonathan Papelbon** (19)	24,915	37–48
86	July 4	@ Pirates	2–8	Gerrit Cole (7–4)	**Roberto Hernández** (3–8)	None	38,977	37–49
87	July 5	@ Pirates	3–2	Edinson Vólquez (7–6)	**David Buchanan** (4–5)	Mark Melancon (16)	37,821	37–50
88	July 6	@ Pirates	2–6	Jeff Locke (2–1)	**A. J. Burnett** (5–8)	None	33,408	37–51
89	July 7	@ Brewers	3–2	**Cole Hamels** (3–5)	Marco Estrada (7–6)	**Jonathan Papelbon** (20)	28,080	38–51
90	July 8	@ Brewers	9–7	**Kyle Kendrick** (4–8)	Wily Peralta (9–6)	**Jonathan Papelbon** (21)	26,126	39–51
91	July 9	@ Brewers	4–1	**Roberto Hernández** (4–8)	Kyle Lohse (9–4)	**Jonathan Papelbon** (22)	26,480	40–51
92	July 10	@ Brewers	9–1	**David Buchanan** (5–5)	Matt Garza (6–6)	None	36,394	41–51
93	July 11	Nationals	6–2	**A. J. Burnett** (6–8)	Jordan Zimmermann (6–5)	None	30,094	42–51
94	July 12	Nationals	3–5 (10)	Ross Detwiler (1–2)	**Jake Diekman** (3–3)	Rafael Soriano (22)	32,072	42–52
95	July 13	Nationals	3–10	Tanner Roark (8–6)	**Kyle Kendrick** (4–9)	None	30,185	42–53
–	July 15	**2014 Major League Baseball All-Star Game at Target Field in Minneapolis**						
96	July 18	@ Braves	4–6	Ervin Santana (8–6)	**A. J. Burnett** (6–9)	Craig Kimbrel (30)	39,747	42–54
97	July 19	@ Braves	2–1	**Cole Hamels** (4–5)	Shae Simmons (1–1)	**Jonathan Papelbon** (23)	38,602	43–54
98	July 20	@ Braves	2–8	Alex Wood (7–7)	**Kyle Kendrick** (4–10)	None	24,859	43–55
99	July 21	Giants	4–7	George Kontos (2–0)	**Cliff Lee** (4–5)	Santiago Casilla (6)	27,334	43–56
100	July 22	Giants	6–9 (14)	George Kontos (3–0)	**Jeff Manship** (1–2)	Tim Lincecum (1)	30,109	43–57
101	July 23	Giants	1–3	Madison Bumgarner (12–7)	**Jonathan Papelbon** (2–2)	Santiago Casilla (7)	28,648	43–58
102	July 24	Giants	2–1	**Cole Hamels** (5–5)	Tim Hudson (8–7)	**Jonathan Papelbon** (24)	33,253	44–58
103	July 25	Diamondbacks	9–5	**Kyle Kendrick** (5–10)	Wade Miley (6–7)	None	25,698	45–58
104	July 26	Diamondbacks	6–10 (10)	Evan Marshall (3–2)	**Antonio Bastardo** (4–4)	None	29,097	45–59
105	July 27	Diamondbacks	4–2	**Roberto Hernández** (5–8)	Vidal Nuño (2–7)	**Jonathan Papelbon** (25)	31,514	46–59
106	July 28	@ Mets	1–7	Bartolo Colón (10–8)	**A. J. Burnett** (6–10)	None	26,525	46–60
107	July 29	@ Mets	6–0	**Cole Hamels** (6–5)	Dillon Gee (4–4)	None	27,069	47–60
108	July 30	@ Mets	2–11	Zack Wheeler (6–8)	**Kyle Kendrick** (5–11)	None	37,647	47–61
109	July 31	@ Nationals	10–4	**Antonio Bastardo** (5–4)	Gio González (6–7)	None	35,722	48–61

August (14–13)

#	Date	Opponent	Score	Win	Loss	Save	Attendance	Record
110	August 1	@ Nationals	2–1	**Roberto Hernández** (6–8)	Doug Fister (10–3)	**Jonathan Papelbon** (26)	28,410	49–61
111	August 2	@ Nationals	0–11	Jordan Zimmermann (7–5)	**A. J. Burnett** (6–11)	None	36,155	49–62
112	August 3	@ Nationals	0–4	Stephen Strasburg (8–9)	**Cole Hamels** (6–6)	None	30,038	49–63
113	August 5	Astros	2–1 (15)	**Héctor Neris** (1–0)	Jake Buchanan (1–2)	None	28,336	50–63
114	August 6	Astros	10–3	**David Buchanan** (6–5)	Brad Peacock (3–8)	None	26,691	51–63
115	August 7	Astros	6–5	**Mario Hollands** (2–1)	Tony Sipp (2–2)	**Jonathan Papelbon** (27)	26,609	52–63
116	August 8	Mets	4–5	Bartolo Colón (11–9)	**A. J. Burnett** (6–12)	Jenrry Mejía (17)	32,307	52–64
117	August 9	Mets	1–2 (11)	Dana Eveland (1–1)	**Antonio Bastardo** (5–5)	Jeurys Familia (2)	39,153	52–65
118	August 10	Mets	7–6	**Ken Giles** (1–0)	Jenrry Mejía (5–5)	None	31,061	53–65
119	August 11	Mets	3–5	Jon Niese (6–8)	**David Buchanan** (6–6)	Jeurys Familia (3)	26,076	53–66
120	August 12	@ Angels	2–7	C. J. Wilson (9–8)	**Antonio Bastardo** (5–6)	None	37,296	53–67
121	August 13	@ Angels	3–4	Jered Weaver (13–7)	**A. J. Burnett** (6–13)	Huston Street (31)	38,802	53–68
122	August 15	@ Giants	5–3 (10)	**Ken Giles** (2–0)	Santiago Casilla (1–3)	**Jonathan Papelbon** (28)	41,425	54–68
123	August 16	@ Giants	5–6	Jeremy Affeldt (3–1)	**Antonio Bastardo** (5–7)	Sergio Romo (23)	41,907	54–69
124	August 17	@ Giants	2–5	Tim Lincecum (10–8)	**David Buchanan** (6–7)	Santiago Casilla (10)	41,851	54–70
125	August 18	Mariners	4–1	**Jerome Williams** (3–5)	Roenis Elías (9–10)	**Jonathan Papelbon** (29)	28,102	55–70
126	August 19	Mariners	2–5	Hisashi Iwakuma (12–6)	**A. J. Burnett** (6–14)	Fernando Rodney (36)	31,592	55–71
127	August 20	Mariners	4–3	**Cole Hamels** (7–6)	James Paxton (3–1)	**Jonathan Papelbon** (30)	25,157	56–71
128	August 22	Cardinals	5–4	**Kyle Kendrick** (6–11)	Adam Wainwright (15–8)	**Jonathan Papelbon** (31)	28,366	57–71
129	August 23	Cardinals	5–6 (12)	Seth Maness (5–2)	**Ken Giles** (2–1)	Trevor Rosenthal (38)	30,352	57–72
130	August 24	Cardinals	7–1	**Jerome Williams** (4–5)	Justin Masterson (6–8)	None	30,580	58–72
131	August 25	Nationals	3–2	**A. J. Burnett** (7–14)	Tanner Roark (12–8)	**Jonathan Papelbon** (32)	23,089	59–72
132	August 26	Nationals	4–3	**Ken Giles** (3–1)	Tyler Clippard (7–3)	**Jonathan Papelbon** (33)	25,238	60–72
133	August 27	Nationals	8–4	**Kyle Kendrick** (7–11)	Doug Fister (12–5)	None	33,183	61–72
134	August 29	@ Mets	1–4	Jacob deGrom (7–6)	**Jake Diekman** (3–4)	Jenrry Mejía (20)	25,250	61–73
135	August 30	@ Mets	7–2	**Jerome Williams** (5–5)	Bartolo Colón (12–11)	None	28,053	62–73
136	August 31	@ Mets	5–6	Dillon Gee (6–6)	**A. J. Burnett** (7–15)	Jenrry Mejía (21)	27,159	62–74

September (11–15)

#	Date	Opponent	Score	Win	Loss	Save	Attendance	Record
137	September 1	@ Braves	7–0	**Cole Hamels** (8–6)	Julio Teherán (13–10)	None	34,178	63–74
138	September 2	@ Braves	4–0	**Kyle Kendrick** (8–11)	Mike Minor (6–9)	None	19,444	64–74
139	September 3	@ Braves	4–7	Ervin Santana (14–7)	**Mario Hollands** (2–2)	Craig Kimbrel (42)	19,724	64–75
140	September 5	@ Nationals	9–8 (11)	**Jake Diekman** (4–4)	Craig Stammen (4–5)	**Jonathan Papelbon** (34)	27,437	65–75
141	September 6	@ Nationals	3–1	**A. J. Burnett** (8–15)	Tanner Roark (12–10)	**Jonathan Papelbon** (35)	37,408	66–75
142	September 7	@ Nationals	2–3	Gio González (8–9)	**Cole Hamels** (8–7)	Drew Storen (2)	29,108	66–76
143	September 8	Pirates	4–6	Jeff Locke (7–4)	**Kyle Kendrick** (8–12)	Mark Melancon (27)	23,140	66–77
144	September 9	Pirates	4–3	**Justin De Fratus** (3–1)	Justin Wilson (3–4)	**Jonathan Papelbon** (36)	26,900	67–77
145	September 10	Pirates	3–6	Vance Worley (7–4)	**Jerome Williams** (5–6)	Mark Melancon (28)	25,315	67–78
146	September 11	Pirates	1–4	Francisco Liriano (5–10)	**A. J. Burnett** (8–16)	Mark Melancon (29)	26,535	67–79
147	September 12	Marlins	3–1 (10)	**Jake Diekman** (5–4)	Dan Jennings (0–2)	None	27,039	68–79
148	September 13	Marlins	2–1	**Kyle Kendrick** (9–12)	Brad Hand (3–7)	**Jonathan Papelbon** (37)	26,163	69–79
149	September 14	Marlins	4–5	Anthony DeSclafani (2–2)	**Jonathan Papelbon** (2–3)	Steve Cishek (35)	30,201	69–80
150	September 15	@ Padres	0–1	Andrew Cashner (4–7)	**Jerome Williams** (5–7)	None	17,558	69–81
151	September 16	@ Padres	4–5	Ian Kennedy (11–13)	**A. J. Burnett** (8–17)	Kevin Quackenbush (4)	24,541	69–82
152	September 17	@ Padres	5–2	**Cole Hamels** (9–7)	Eric Stults (7–17)	None	17,311	70–82
153	September 18	@ Padres	3–7	Robbie Erlin (4–4)	**Kyle Kendrick** (9–13)	None	18,076	70–83
154	September 19	@ Athletics	1–3	Jon Lester (16–10)	**David Buchanan** (6–8)	Sean Doolittle (22)	35,067	70–84
155	September 20	@ Athletics	3–0	**Jerome Williams** (6–7)	Dan Otero (8–2)	**Ken Giles** (1)	31,848	71–84
156	September 21	@ Athletics	6–8 (10)	Sean Doolittle (2–4)	**Miguel Alfredo González** (0–1)	None	25,126	71–85
157	September 23	@ Marlins	0–2	Henderson Álvarez (12–6)	**Cole Hamels** (9–8)	Steve Cishek (38)	18,969	71–86
158	September 24	@ Marlins	2–1	**Kyle Kendrick** (10–13)	Chris Hatcher (0–3)	**Jonathan Papelbon** (38)	22,491	72–86
159	September 25	@ Marlins	4–6	Tom Koehler (10–10)	**Jake Diekman** (5–5)	Steve Cishek (39)	24,259	72–87
160	September 26	Braves	5–4	**Luis García** (1–0)	Jordan Walden (0–2)	**Jonathan Papelbon** (39)	33,121	73–87
161	September 27	Braves	2–4	Aaron Harang (12–12)	**A. J. Burnett** (8–18)	Craig Kimbrel (46)	33,761	73–88
162	September 28	Braves	1–2	Luis Avilán (4–1)	**Cole Hamels** (9–9)	Craig Kimbrel (47)	38,082	73–89

- Phillies win
- Phillies loss
- Postponement
- Bold: Phillies team member
Source: ESPN

=== Roster ===
All players who made an appearance for the Phillies during 2014 are included.

2014 Philadelphia Phillies
**Roster**
**Pitchers**: 37 Mike Adams; 48 Phillippe Aumont; 59 Antonio Bastardo; 55 David Buchanan; 34 A. J. Burnett; 50 Shawn Camp; 30 Justin De Fratus; 63 Jake Diekman; 57 Luis García; 53 Ken Giles; 75 Miguel González; 35 Cole Hamels; 27 Roberto Hernández; 43 Mario Hollands; 56 César Jiménez; 38 Kyle Kendrick; 33 Cliff Lee; 31 Brad Lincoln; 52,60 Jeff Manship; 49 Ethan Martin; 50 Héctor Neris; 61 Sean O'Sullivan; 58 Jonathan Papelbon; 44 Jonathan Pettibone; 39 B. J. Rosenberg; 31 Jerome Williams	**Catchers**: 47 Koyie Hill; 21 Wil Nieves; 51 Carlos Ruiz; 29 Cameron Rupp; **Infielders**: 25 Cody Asche; 4 Andrés Blanco; 17 Reid Brignac; 7 Ronny Cedeño; 7 Maikel Franco; 13 Freddy Galvis; 16 César Hernández; 6 Ryan Howard; 7 Jayson Nix; 11 Jimmy Rollins; 18 Darin Ruf; 26 Chase Utley	**Outfielders**: 40 Aaron Altherr; 9 Domonic Brown; 3 Marlon Byrd; 19 Tony Gwynn Jr.; 15 John Mayberry Jr.; 2 Ben Revere; 24 Grady Sizemore	**Manager**: 23 Ryne Sandberg; **Coaches**: 10 Larry Bowa (bench); 5 Steve Henderson (hitting); 22 Bob McClure (pitching); 45 Pete Mackanin (third base); 12 John Mizerock (assistant hitting); 54 Rod Nichols (bullpen); 8 Juan Samuel (first base); 81 Jesús Tiamo (bullpen catcher)

== Player statistics ==
=== Batting ===
List does not include pitchers. Stats in bold indicate team leaders. Only stats recorded with Phillies are included.

Note: G = Games played; AB = At bats; R = Runs; H = Hits; 2B = Doubles; 3B = Triples; HR = Home runs; RBI = Runs batted in; BB = Walks; SO = Strikeouts; SB = Stolen bases; Avg. = Batting average; OBP = On base percentage; SLG = Slugging; OPS = On Base + Slugging

Player	G	AB	R	H	2B	3B	HR	RBI	BB	SO	SB	AVG	OBP	SLG	OPS
Chase Utley	**155**	589	74	159	**36**	6	11	78	53	85	10	.270	.339	.407	.746
Ben Revere	151	**601**	71	**184**	13	**7**	2	28	13	49	**49**	**.306**	.325	.361	.686
Jimmy Rollins	138	538	**78**	131	22	4	17	55	64	100	28	.243	.323	.394	.717
Marlon Byrd	154	591	71	156	28	2	**25**	85	35	185	3	.264	.312	**.445**	**.757**
Ryan Howard	153	569	65	127	18	1	23	**95**	**67**	**190**	0	.223	.310	.380	.690
Carlos Ruiz	110	381	43	96	25	1	6	31	46	60	4	.252	**.347**	.370	.717
Domonic Brown	144	473	47	165	22	1	10	63	34	91	7	.235	.285	.349	.634
Cody Asche	121	397	43	155	25	0	10	46	33	102	0	.252	.309	.390	.699
Grady Sizemore	60	162	21	41	9	2	3	12	14	35	1	.253	.313	.389	.701
John Mayberry Jr.	63	122	11	26	7	0	6	21	15	30	0	.213	.304	.418	.722
Wil Nieves	36	122	9	31	8	0	1	7	1	34	1	.254	.270	.344	.614
Freddy Galvis	43	119	14	21	3	1	4	12	8	30	1	.176	.227	.319	.546
César Hernández	66	114	13	27	2	0	1	4	9	33	1	.237	.290	.281	.571
Tony Gwynn Jr.	80	105	14	16	2	1	0	3	15	23	3	.152	.264	.190	.455
Darin Ruf	52	102	13	24	8	0	3	8	8	32	0	.235	.310	.402	.712
Reid Brignac	37	81	4	18	5	1	1	10	9	33	1	.222	.300	.346	.646
Cameron Rupp	18	60	4	11	4	0	0	6	4	20	0	.183	.234	.250	.484
Maikel Franco	16	56	5	10	2	0	0	5	1	13	0	.179	.190	.214	.404
Andrés Blanco	25	47	4	13	5	0	1	3	2	6	0	.277	.306	.447	.753
Jayson Nix	18	39	1	6	0	0	1	2	2	18	0	.154	.214	.231	.445
Koyie Hill	10	21	2	5	1	0	0	1	1	5	0	.238	.273	.286	.558
Ronny Cedeño	7	9	0	0	0	0	0	0	0	2	0	.000	.000	.000	.000
Aaron Altherr	2	5	0	0	0	0	0	0	0	2	0	.000	.000	.000	.000
Pitcher totals	162	300	12	43	6	0	0	9	9	128	0	.143	.168	.163	.332
**Team totals**	**162**	**5603**	**619**	**1356**	**251**	**27**	**125**	**584**	**443**	**1306**	**109**	**.242**	**.302**	**.363**	**.665**

- Source: MLB.com

=== Pitching ===
Stats in bold indicate team leaders. Only stats with the Phillies are shown.

Note: W = Wins; L = Losses; ERA = Earned run average; G = Games pitched; GS = Games started; SV = Saves; IP = Innings pitched; H = Hits allowed; R = Runs allowed; ER = Earned runs allowed; BB = Walks allowed; K = Strikeouts; BAA = Batting average against; WHIP = Walks + hits per inning pitched

Player	W	L	ERA	G	GS	SV	IP	H	R	ER	BB	K	BAA	WHIP
Kyle Kendrick	**10**	13	4.61	32	32	0	199.0	**214**	108	102	57	121	.276	1.36
A. J. Burnett	8	**18**	4.59	34	**34**	0	**213.2**	205	**122**	**109**	**96**	190	.256	1.41
Ken Giles	3	1	1.18	44	0	1	45.2	25	7	6	11	64	.164	0.79
Jake Diekman	5	5	3.80	**73**	0	0	71.0	66	36	30	35	100	.248	1.42
Jonathan Papelbon	2	3	2.04	66	0	**39**	66.1	45	15	15	15	63	.191	0.90
Cole Hamels	9	9	**2.46**	30	30	0	204.2	176	60	56	59	**198**	**.235**	**1.15**
David Buchanan	6	8	3.75	20	20	0	117.2	120	55	49	32	71	.264	1.29
Roberto Hernandez	6	8	3.87	23	20	0	121.0	108	57	52	55	75	.237	1.35
Antonio Bastardo	5	7	3.94	67	0	0	64.0	43	31	28	34	81	.188	1.20
Cliff Lee	4	5	3.65	13	13	0	81.1	100	40	33	12	72	.304	1.38
Jerome Williams	4	2	2.83	9	9	0	57.1	48	20	18	17	38	.230	1.13
Justin De Fratus	3	1	2.39	54	0	0	52.2	45	19	14	12	49	.223	1.08
Mike Adams	2	1	2.89	22	0	0	18.2	16	8	6	8	21	.232	1.29
Mario Hollands	2	2	4.40	50	0	0	47.0	45	25	23	21	35	.253	1.40
Luis García	1	0	6.43	13	0	0	14.0	14	12	10	13	12	.255	1.93
Jeff Manship	1	2	6.65	20	0	0	23.0	24	17	17	14	16	.273	1.65
B.J. Rosenberg	1	0	6.75	13	0	0	12.0	20	10	9	7	9	.385	2.25
César Jiménez	0	0	1.69	16	0	0	16.0	14	3	3	7	8	.246	1.31
Sean O'Sullivan	0	1	6.39	3	2	0	12.2	15	9	9	2	7	.306	1.93
Jonathan Pettibone	0	1	9.00	2	2	0	9.0	17	10	9	3	6	.395	2.22
Phillipe Aumont	0	1	19.06	5	0	0	5.2	14	12	12	5	6	.483	3.35
Miguel Alfredo González	0	1	6.75	6	0	0	5.1	9	4	4	3	5	.346	2.25
Ethan Martin	0	0	4.50	2	0	0	4.0	1	2	2	3	4	.071	1.00
Shawn Camp	0	0	5.40	3	0	0	3.1	7	2	2	0	1	.467	2.10
Brad Lincoln	0	0	11.57	2	0	0	2.1	5	3	3	0	2	.417	2.14
Héctor Neris	1	0	0.00	1	0	0	1.0	0	0	0	0	1	.000	0.00
**Team totals**	**73**	**89**	**3.79**	**162**	**162**	**40**	**1468.1**	**1396**	**687**	**619**	**521**	**1255**	**.252**	**1.31**

- Source: MLB.com

== Farm system ==
Level	Team	League	Manager
AAA	Lehigh Valley IronPigs	International League	Dave Brundage
AA	Reading Fightin Phils	Eastern League	Dusty Wathan
A-Advanced	Clearwater Threshers	Florida State League	Nelson Prada
A	Lakewood BlueClaws	South Atlantic League	Greg Legg
A-Short Season	Williamsport Crosscutters	New York–Penn League	Shawn Williams
Rookie	GCL Phillies	Arizona League	Roly de Armas
Rookie	VSL Phillies	Venezuelan Summer League	Trino Aguilar
Rookie	DSL Phillies	Dominican Summer League	Manny Amador
