= Jesús Tiamo =

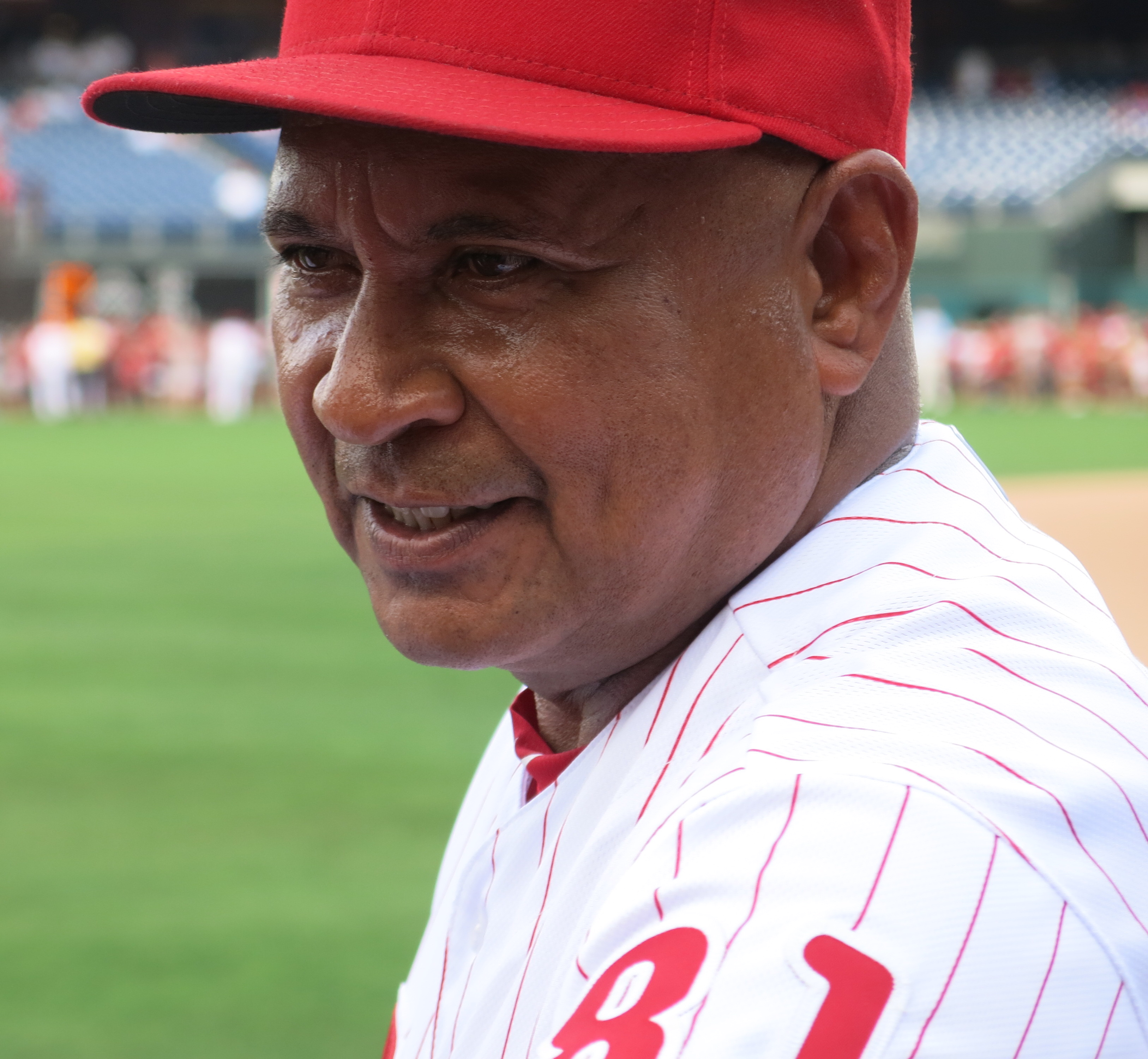
- Tiamo with the Phillies in 2016
- Catcher / Bullpen catcher
- Born: January 1, 1961 (age 64); Puerto La Cruz, Venezuela
- Bats: Right Throws: Right

Teams
- As coach: Philadelphia Phillies (2009–2017)

Jesús Tiamo (born January 1, 1961) is a Venezuelan coach in Minor League Baseball (MiLB), for the DSL Phillies. He served as the bullpen catcher for the Philadelphia Phillies, a position he held from 2009–2017. Tiamo wore uniform number 81. In 2018, he became a coach for the DSL Phillies Red Team.

Tiamo graduated from Liceo Pedro María Freite, where he played both volleyball and baseball.

== Playing career ==
Tiamo spent three seasons in the Pittsburgh Pirates farm system, from 1980 to 1981 and in 1983, playing as high as Class A. In 1980, he hit .303 with 19 runs batted in (RBI) for the GCL Pirates. In 1981, Tiamo hit .267 with five home runs, 75 RBI, and 13 stolen bases for the Greenwood Pirates. In 1983, he hit .261 with three home runs and 43 RBI for Greenwood. In total, Tiamo hit .268/.318/.371 with 8 home runs, 20 stolen bases, and 137 RBI in 988 at bats. He played 77 games at catcher and 36 games at first base.

Thereafter, Tiamo spent seven seasons with Navegantes del Magallanes of the Venezuelan Professional Baseball League. He played Venezuelan winter ball in 11 offseasons for four different teams: Magallanes (1980-1887), Zulia (1988), Lara (1989), and Oriente (1990).

Tiamo played for the Venezuela national baseball team in the 1979 Pan American Games.

== Coaching career ==
Prior to serving as the Phillies' bullpen catcher, Tiamo coached in the minor leagues for the Chicago White Sox from 1995 to 1999, the New York Mets from 2000 to 2007, and the Phillies in 2008 (as a coach in the Venezuelan Summer League).

Tiamo first served as the Phillies bullpen catcher in 2009. In 2016, at the age of 55, he was the oldest bullpen catcher in the major leagues.

Tiamo was named the catching coach for the DSL Phillies for the 2018 season.
