= 2014 Atlanta Braves season =

2014 Atlanta Braves
- League: National League
- Division: East
- Ballpark: Turner Field
- City: Atlanta, Georgia
- Record: 79–83 (.488)
- Divisional place: 2nd
- Owners: Liberty Media/John Malone
- General managers: Frank Wren
- Managers: Fredi González
- Television: SportSouth; Fox Sports South (Chip Caray, Joe Simpson, Tom Glavine, Dale Murphy)
- Radio: WCNN; WNNX; Atlanta Braves Radio Network (Jim Powell, Don Sutton, Mark Lemke, Pete Manzano, Fernando Palacios)

The 2014 Atlanta Braves season was the Braves' 18th season of home games at Turner Field, 49th season in Atlanta, and 144th season overall. Before September, the Braves had two winning months and three non-winning months that they played, and briefly reached first place in their division. The team's performance declined in September, as the team lost 16 out of the first 20 games they played that month. They finished tied in second place with a 79–83 record, 17 games back in second place in the division, and failed to make the playoffs.

== Season standings ==
=== National League East ===
NL East
Team	W	L	Pct.	GB	Home	Road
Washington Nationals	96	66	.593	—	51‍–‍30	45‍–‍36
Atlanta Braves	79	83	.488	17	42‍–‍39	37‍–‍44
New York Mets	79	83	.488	17	40‍–‍41	39‍–‍42
Miami Marlins	77	85	.475	19	42‍–‍39	35‍–‍46
Philadelphia Phillies	73	89	.451	23	37‍–‍44	36‍–‍45

=== National League Wild Card Standings ===
Division leaders
Team	W	L	Pct.
Washington Nationals	96	66	.593
Los Angeles Dodgers	94	68	.580
St. Louis Cardinals	90	72	.556

Wild Card teams (Top 2 teams qualify for postseason)
Team	W	L	Pct.	GB
Pittsburgh Pirates	88	74	.543	—
San Francisco Giants	88	74	.543	—
Milwaukee Brewers	82	80	.506	6
New York Mets	79	83	.488	9
Atlanta Braves	79	83	.488	9
Miami Marlins	77	85	.475	11
San Diego Padres	77	85	.475	11
Cincinnati Reds	76	86	.469	12
Philadelphia Phillies	73	89	.451	15
Chicago Cubs	73	89	.451	15
Colorado Rockies	66	96	.407	22
Arizona Diamondbacks	64	98	.395	24

=== Record vs. opponents ===
2014 National League record Source: MLB Standings Grid – 2014
Team	AZ	ATL	CHC	CIN	COL	LAD	MIA	MIL	NYM	PHI	PIT	SD	SF	STL	WSH	AL
Arizona	–	3–3	5–2	3–4	9–10	4–15	3–4	3–4	2–4	2–4	3–4	12–7	6–13	1–5	1–6	7–13
Atlanta	3–3	–	5–1	5–2	4–3	1–6	9–10	5–2	9–10	11–8	3–4	3–4	1–5	2–4	11–8	7–13
Chicago	2–5	1–5	–	8–11	5–2	3–4	4–2	11–8	5–2	3–3	5–14	3–4	2–4	9–10	3–4	9–11
Cincinnati	4–3	2–5	11–8	–	3–4	3–4	4–3	10–9	2–4	3–3	12–7	1–5	5–2	7–12	3–3	6–14
Colorado	10–9	3–4	2–5	4–3	–	6–13	3–4	1–6	3–4	3–3	2–4	10–9	10–9	1–5	1–5	7–13
Los Angeles	15–4	6–1	4–3	4–3	13–6	–	3–3	1–5	4–2	3–4	2–5	12–7	10–9	4–3	2–4	11–9
Miami	4–3	10–9	2–4	3–4	4–3	3–3	–	3–4	8–11	9–10	2–4	3–4	3–4	4–2	6–13	13–7
Milwaukee	4–3	2–5	8–11	9–10	6–1	5–1	4–3	–	4–3	3–4	12–7	3–3	2–4	7–12	2–4	11–9
New York	4–2	10–9	2–5	4–2	4–3	2–4	11–8	3–4	–	13–6	3–4	3–3	1–6	4–3	4–15	11–9
Philadelphia	4–2	8–11	3–3	3–3	3–3	4–3	10–9	4–3	6–13	–	1–6	4–3	2–5	4–3	10–9	7–13
Pittsburgh	4–3	4–3	14–5	7–12	4–2	5–2	4–2	7–12	4–3	6–1	–	3–3	4–2	8–11	3–4	11–9
San Diego	7–12	4–3	4–3	5–1	9–10	7–12	4–3	3–3	3–3	3–4	3–3	–	10–9	3–4	3–4	9–11
San Francisco	13–6	5–1	4–2	2–5	9–10	9–10	4–3	4–2	6–1	5–2	2–4	9–10	–	4–3	2–5	10–10
St. Louis	5–1	4–2	10–9	12–7	5–1	3–4	2–4	12–7	3–4	3–4	11–8	4–3	3–4	–	5–2	8–12
Washington	6–1	8–11	4–3	3–3	5–1	4–2	13–6	4–2	15–4	9–10	4–3	4–3	5–2	2–5	–	10–10

== Roster ==
2014 Atlanta Braves
Roster
Pitchers: 43 Luis Avilán; 51 Pedro Beato; 60 Ryan Buchter; 48 David Carpenter; 32 Gavin Floyd; 57 David Hale; 34 Aaron Harang; 58 Juan Jaime; 46 Craig Kimbrel; 36 Mike Minor; 51 James Russell; 30 Ervin Santana; 50 Gus Schlosser; 51,61 Chasen Shreve; 59 Shae Simmons; 49 Julio Teherán; 67,58 Ian Thomas; 38 Anthony Varvaro; 52 Jordan Walden; 40 Alex Wood	Catchers: 25 Christian Bethancourt; 24 Evan Gattis; 11 Gerald Laird; Infielders: 5 Freddie Freeman; 15 Phil Gosselin; 23 Chris Johnson; 7 Tommy La Stella; 1 Tyler Pastornicky; 14 Ramiro Peña; 19 Andrelton Simmons; 26 Dan Uggla	Outfielders: 1 Emilio Bonifacio; 13 José Constanza; 4 Ryan Doumit; 22 Jason Heyward; 17 Jordan Schafer; 17 Joey Terdoslavich; 2 B. J. Upton; 8 Justin Upton	Manager: 33 Fredi González; Coaches: 55 Alan Butts (bullpen catcher); 28 Doug Dascenzo (third base); -- Lee Elia (special assistant); 56 Scott Fletcher (assistant hitting); 45 Roger McDowell (pitching); 9 Terry Pendleton (first base); 12 Eddie Pérez (bullpen); 62 Horacio Ramírez (assistant coach); 18 Carlos Tosca (bench); 27 Greg Walker (hitting)

== Player stats ==
=== Batting ===
Note: G = Games played; AB = At bats; R = Runs; H = Hits; 2B = Doubles; 3B = Triples; HR = Home runs; RBI = Runs batted in; SB = Stolen bases; BB = Walks; AVG = Batting average; SLG = Slugging average

Player	G	AB	R	H	2B	3B	HR	RBI	SB	BB	AVG	SLG
Freddie Freeman	162	607	93	175	43	4	18	78	3	90	.288	.461
Chris Johnson	153	582	43	153	27	0	10	58	6	23	.263	.361
Jason Heyward	149	573	74	155	26	3	11	58	20	67	.271	.384
Justin Upton	154	566	77	153	34	2	29	102	8	60	.270	.491
Andrelton Simmons	146	540	44	132	18	4	7	46	4	32	.244	.331
B.J. Upton	141	519	67	108	19	5	12	35	20	57	.208	.333
Evan Gattis	108	369	41	97	17	1	22	52	0	22	.263	.493
Tommy La Stella	93	319	22	80	16	1	1	31	2	36	.251	.317
Ryan Doumit	100	157	11	31	4	0	5	17	1	7	.147	.318
Gerald Laird	53	152	12	31	8	0	0	10	0	14	.204	.257
Ramiro Peña	81	147	9	36	6	0	3	9	1	13	.245	.347
Dan Uggla	48	130	13	21	3	0	2	10	0	10	.162	.231
Phil Gosselin	46	128	17	34	4	0	1	3	2	5	.266	.320
Emilio Bonifácio	41	118	12	25	3	1	1	6	12	10	.212	.280
Christian Bethancourt	31	113	7	28	3	0	0	9	1	3	.248	.274
Jordan Schafer	63	80	9	13	4	0	0	2	15	10	.163	.213
Tyler Pastornicky	28	40	4	8	0	1	0	2	0	6	.200	.250
Joey Terdoslavich	9	10	1	3	2	0	0	2	0	0	.300	.500
José Constanza	12	4	1	0	0	0	0	0	0	0	.000	.000
Pitcher totals	162	314	16	33	3	0	1	15	0	7	.105	.124
Team totals	162	5468	573	1316	240	22	123	545	95	472	.241	.360

=== Pitching ===
Note: W = Wins; L = Losses; ERA = Earned run average; G = Games pitched; GS = Games started; SV = Saves; IP = Innings pitched; H = Hits allowed; R = Runs allowed; ER = Earned runs allowed; BB = Walks allowed; SO = Strikeouts

Player	W	L	ERA	G	GS	SV	IP	H	R	ER	BB	SO
Julio Teherán	14	13	2.89	33	33	0	221.0	188	82	71	51	186
Aaron Harang	12	12	3.57	33	33	0	204.1	215	88	81	71	161
Ervin Santana	14	10	3.95	31	31	0	196.0	193	90	86	63	179
Alex Wood	11	11	2.78	35	24	0	171.2	151	58	53	45	170
Mike Minor	6	12	4.77	25	25	0	145.1	165	77	77	44	120
David Hale	4	5	3.30	45	6	0	87.1	89	38	32	39	44
Craig Kimbrel	0	3	1.61	63	0	47	61.2	30	13	11	26	95
David Carpenter	6	4	3.54	65	0	3	61.0	61	27	24	16	67
Anthony Varvaro	3	3	2.63	61	0	0	54.2	46	18	16	13	50
Gavin Floyd	2	2	2.65	9	9	0	54.1	55	23	16	13	45
Jordan Walden	0	2	2.88	58	0	3	50.0	33	17	16	27	62
Luis Avilán	4	1	4.57	62	0	0	43.1	47	22	22	21	25
James Russell	0	0	2.22	22	1	0	24.1	21	6	6	4	16
Shae Simmons	1	2	2.91	26	0	1	21.2	15	8	7	11	23
Gus Schlosser	0	1	7.64	15	0	0	17.2	23	16	15	6	8
Juan Jaime	0	0	5.84	16	0	0	12.1	14	8	8	9	18
Chasen Shreve	0	0	0.73	15	0	0	12.1	10	1	1	3	15
Ian Thomas	1	2	4.22	16	0	0	10.2	10	5	5	6	13
Pedro Beato	0	0	0.00	3	0	0	4.1	3	0	0	3	3
Ryan Buchter	1	0	0.00	1	0	0	1.0	0	0	0	1	1
Team totals	79	83	3.38	162	162	54	1455.0	1369	597	547	472	1301

== Game log ==
Legend
Braves Win	Braves Loss	Game postponed

2014 Regular Season Game Log: 79–83 (Home: 42–39; Away: 37–44)
March: 0–1 (Home: 0–0; Away: 0–1)

#	Date	Opponent	Score	Win	Loss	Save	Attendance	Record	Box/ Streak
1	Mar 31	@ Brewers	0–2	Gallardo (1–0)	Teherán (0–1)	Rodríguez (1)	45,691	0–1	L1

April: 17–8 (Home: 9–3; Away: 8–5)

#	Date	Opponent	Score	Win	Loss	Save	Attendance	Record	Box/ Streak
2	Apr 1	@ Brewers	5–2	Wood (1–0)	Lohse (0–1)	Kimbrel (1)	21,503	1–1	W1
3	Apr 2	@ Brewers	1–0	Harang (1–0)	Garza (0–1)	Kimbrel (2)	21,712	2–1	W2
4	Apr 4	@ Nationals	2–1	Avilán (1–0)	Clippard (0–1)	Kimbrel (3)	42,834	3–1	W3
5	Apr 5	@ Nationals	6–2	Teherán (1–1)	Strasburg (0–1)		37,841	4–1	W4
6	Apr 6	@ Nationals	1–2	Blevins (1–0)	Wood (1–1)	Soriano (1)	34,327	4–2	L1
7	Apr 8	Mets	0–4	Colón (1–1)	Harang (1–1)		47,144	4–3	L2
8	Apr 9	Mets	4–3	Santana (1–0)	Wheeler (0–2)	Kimbrel (4)	19,608	5–3	W1
9	Apr 10	Mets	4–6	Torres (2–0)	Avilán (1–1)	Valverde (2)	29,470	5–4	L1
10	Apr 11	Nationals	7–6 (10)	Avilán (2–1)	Blevins (1–1)		28,243	6–4	W1
11	Apr 12	Nationals	6–3	Wood (2–1)	Jordan (0–1)	Kimbrel (5)	36,621	7–4	W2
12	Apr 13	Nationals	10–2	Harang (2–1)	Gonzalez (2–1)		27,919	8–4	W3
13	Apr 14	@ Phillies	9–6	Avilán (3–1)	Diekman (1–1)	Carpenter (1)	26,516	9–4	W4
	Apr 15	@ Phillies	PPD, RAIN; rescheduled for June 28						
14	Apr 16	@ Phillies	1–0	Teherán (2–1)	Lee (2–2)		23,382	10–4	W5
15	Apr 17	@ Phillies	0–1	Bastardo (2–1)	Wood (2–2)	Papelbon (4)	25,750	10–5	L1
16	Apr 18	@ Mets	6–0	Harang (3–1)	Niese (0–2)		33,199	11–5	W1
17	Apr 19	@ Mets	7–5	Santana (2–0)	Colón (1–3)	Walden (1)	31,476	12–5	W2
18	Apr 20	@ Mets	3–4 (14)	Valverde (1–0)	Schlosser (0–1)		33,131	12–6	L1
19	Apr 21	Marlins	4–2 (10)	Varvaro (1–0)	Caminero (0–1)		16,055	13–6	W1
20	Apr 22	Marlins	0–1	Fernández (3–1)	Wood (2–3)	Cishek (4)	18,275	13–7	L1
21	Apr 23	Marlins	3–1	Carpenter (1–0)	Dunn (1–3)	Kimbrel (6)	21,508	14–7	W1
22	Apr 25	Reds	5–4	Santana (3–0)	Bailey (1–2)	Kimbrel (7)	31,111	15–7	W2
23	Apr 26	Reds	4–1	Hale (1–0)	Leake (2–2)	Kimbrel (8)	33,702	16–7	W3
24	Apr 27	Reds	1–0 (10)	Thomas (1–0)	Hoover (1–3)		31,446	17–7	W4
25	Apr 29	@ Marlins	0–9	Fernández (4–1)	Wood (2–4)		21,992	17–8	L1
26	Apr 30	@ Marlins	3–9	Eovaldi (2–1)	Harang (2–3)		15,558	17–9	L2

May: 13–16 (Home: 9–9; Away: 4–7)

#	Date	Opponent	Score	Win	Loss	Save	Attendance	Record	Box/ Streak
27	May 1	@ Marlins	4–5	Dunn (3–3)	Thomas (1–1)	Cishek (6)	17,836	17–10	L3
28	May 2	Giants	1–2	Lincecum (2–1)	Minor (0–1)	Romo (8)	29,469	17–11	L4
29	May 3	Giants	1–3	Vogelsong (1–1)	Teherán (2–2)	Romo (9)	34,648	17–12	L5
30	May 4	Giants	1–4	Bumgarner (3–3)	Wood (2–5)	Casilla (1)	30,067	17–13	L6
31	May 5	Cardinals	3–4	Miller (4–2)	Harang (3–3)	Rosenthal (9)	20,048	17–14	L7
32	May 6	Cardinals	2–1	Carpenter (2–0)	Choate (0–1)	Kimbrel (9)	18,413	18–14	W1
33	May 7	Cardinals	1–7	Wainwright (6–2)	Minor (0–2)		21,796	18–15	L1
34	May 9	Cubs	3–2 (10)	Wood (3–5)	Wright (0–1)		27,145	19–15	W1
35	May 10	Cubs	2–0	Santana (4–0)	Schlitter (2–1)	Kimbrel (10)	30,658	20–15	W2
36	May 11	Cubs	5–2	Harang (4–3)	Jackson (2–3)	Carpenter (2)	26,151	21–15	W3
37	May 12	@ Giants	2–4	Lincecum (3–2)	Floyd (0–1)	Romo (13)	41,438	21–16	L1
38	May 13	@ Giants	5–0	Minor (1–2)	Vogelsong (1–2)		41,506	22–16	W1
39	May 14	@ Giants	4–10	Bumgarner (5–3)	Teherán (2–3)		41,253	22–17	L1
40	May 16	@ Cardinals	2–5	Lynn (5–2)	Santana (4–1)	Rosenthal (12)	43,701	22–18	L2
41	May 17	@ Cardinals	1–4	Miller (6–2)	Harang (4–4)	Rosenthal (13)	44,981	22–19	L3
42	May 18	@ Cardinals	6–5	Carpenter (3–0)	Rosenthal (0–2)	Kimbrel (11)	44,278	23–19	W1
43	May 19	Brewers	9–3	Minor (2–2)	Peralta (4–3)		20,468	24–19	W2
44	May 20	Brewers	5–0	Teherán (3–3)	Gallardo (2–3)		20,045	25–19	W3
45	May 21	Brewers	1–6	Lohse (6–1)	Santana (4–2)		18,148	25–20	L1
46	May 22	Brewers	5–4	Wood (4–5)	Kintzler (1–2)	Kimbrel (12)	30,148	26–20	W1
47	May 23	Rockies	3–2	Carpenter (4–0)	Ottavino (0–1)	Kimbrel (13)	25,646	27-20	W2
48	May 24	Rockies	1–3	Nicasio (5–2)	Minor (2–3)	Hawkins (11)	26,741	27-21	L1
49	May 25	Rockies	7–0	Teherán (4–3)	Morales (3–4)		35,565	28-21	W1
50	May 26	Red Sox	6–8	Mujica (2–1)	Thomas (1–2)	Uehara (10)	48,501	28–22	L1
51	May 27	Red Sox	3–6	Lester (5–6)	Varvaro (1–1)	Uehara (11)	37,168	28-23	L2
52	May 28	@ Red Sox	0–4	Lackey (6–3)	Floyd (0–2)		36,189	28-24	L3
53	May 29	@ Red Sox	3–4	Uehara (1–1)	Kimbrel (0–1)		36,292	28-25	L4
54	May 30	@ Marlins	3–2	Teherán (5–3)	Koehler (4–5)	Kimbrel (14)	18,469	29-25	W1
55	May 31	@ Marlins	9–5	Santana (5–2)	Turner (1–3)	Kimbrel (15)	26,875	30-25	W2

June: 15–13 (Home: 3–6; Away: 12–7)

#	Date	Opponent	Score	Win	Loss	Save	Attendance	Record	Box/ Streak
56	June 1	@ Marlins	4–2	Wood (6–5)	Cishek (4–2)	Simmons (1)	21,997	31–25	W3
57	June 3	Mariners	5–7	Leone (2–0)	Wood (6–6)	Rodney (15)	36,503	31–26	L1
58	June 4	Mariners	0–2	Iwakuma (4–2)	Minor (2–4)	Rodney (16)	26,960	31–27	L2
59	June 6	@ Diamondbacks	5–2	Teherán (6–3)	McCarthy (1–8)	Kimbrel (16)	24,504	32–27	W1
60	June 7	@ Diamondbacks	3–4 (11)	Delgado (1–1)	Carpenter (4–1)		29,278	32–28	L1
61	June 8	@ Diamondbacks	5–6	Anderson (5–0)	Harang (4–5)	Ziegler (1)	26,534	32–29	L2
62	June 9	@ Rockies	3–1	Floyd (1–2)	Bergman (0–1)	Kimbrel (17)	28,817	33–29	W1
63	June 10	@ Rockies	13–10	Hale (2–0)	Nicasio (5–5)	Kimbrel (18)	27,875	34–29	W2
64	June 11	@ Rockies	2–8	Matzek (1–0)	Teherán (6–4)		29,112	34–30	L1
65	June 12	@ Rockies	3–10	Chacín (1–4)	Santana (5–3)		33,648	34–31	L2
66	June 13	Angels	4–3	Harang (5–5)	Wilson (7–6)	Kimbrel (19)	39,699	35–31	W1
67	June 14	Angels	6–11 (13)	Salas (4–0)	Hale (2–1)		48,559	35–32	L1
68	June 15	Angels	7–3	Varvaro (2–1)	Santiago (0–7)	Kimbrel (20)	29,320	36–32	W1
69	June 16	Phillies	1–6 (13)	Bastardo (4–3)	Hale (2–2)		23,900	36–33	L1
70	June 17	Phillies	2–5	Kendrick (3–6)	Santana (5–4)	Papelbon (16)	41,631	36–34	L2
71	June 18	Phillies	5–10	Hernández (3–5)	Harang (5–6)		28,500	36–35	L3
72	June 19	@ Nationals	3–0	Floyd (2–2)	Zimmermann (5–4)	Kimbrel (21)	32,193	37–35	W1
73	June 20	@ Nationals	6–4 (13)	Buchter (1–0)	Blevins (2–3)	Walden (2)	36,608	38–35	W2
74	June 21	@ Nationals	0–3	Fister (6–2)	Teherán (6–5)	Soriano (16)	40,677	38–36	L1
75	June 22	@ Nationals	1–4	Roark (6–4)	Santana (5–5)	Soriano (17)	39,473	38–37	L2
76	June 24	@ Astros	3–2	Harang (6–6)	Feldman (3–5)	Kimbrel (22)	18,912	39–37	W1
77	June 25	@ Astros	4–0	Wood (6–6)	McHugh (4–6)		20,559	40–37	W2
78	June 26	@ Astros	1–6	Cosart (8–5)	Minor (2–5)		24,474	40–38	L1
79	June 27	@ Phillies	4–2	Teherán (7–5)	Kendrick (3–8)	Kimbrel (23)	38,100	41–38	W1
80	June 28	@ Phillies	10–3	Santana (6–5)	Hernández (3–7)		28,845	42–38	W2
81	June 28	@ Phillies	5–1	Hale (3–2)	O'Sullivan (0–1)		30,845	43–38	W3
82	June 29	@ Phillies	3–2	Harang (7–6)	Buchanan (4–4)	Kimbrel (24)	33,215	44–38	W4
83	June 30	Mets	5–3	Varvaro (3–1)	Familia (1–3)	Kimbrel (25)	28,075	45–38	W5

July: 13–13 (Home: 10–6; Away: 3–7)

#	Date	Opponent	Score	Win	Loss	Save	Attendance	Record	Box/ Streak
84	July 1	Mets	5–4	Simmons (1–0)	Matsuzaka (3–3)	Kimbrel (26)	21,347	46–38	W6
85	July 2	Mets	3–1	Teherán (8–5)	deGrom (1–5)	Walden (3)	23,601	47–38	W7
86	July 4	Diamondbacks	5–2	Santana (7–5)	Collmenter (7–5)	Kimbrel (27)	48,815	48–38	W8
87	July 5	Diamondbacks	10–4	Harang (8–6)	Bolsinger (1–5)		30,405	49–38	W9
88	July 6	Diamondbacks	1–3	Miley (4–6)	Wood (6–7)	Reed (20)	23,709	49–39	L1
89	July 7	@ Mets	3–4 (11)	Torres (4–4)	Varvaro (3–2)		20,836	49–40	L2
90	July 8	@ Mets	3–8	deGrom (2–5)	Teherán (8–6)		20,671	49–41	L3
91	July 9	@ Mets	1–4	Gee (4–1)	Santana (7–6)	Mejía (9)	21,327	49–42	L4
92	July 10	@ Mets	3–1	Harang (9–6)	Colón (8–8)	Kimbrel (28)	23,528	50–42	W1
93	July 11	@ Cubs	4–5	Rondón (2–3)	Walden (0–1)		39,544	50–43	L1
94	July 12	@ Cubs	11–6	Minor (3–5)	Jackson (5–10)	Carpenter (3)	36,806	51–43	W1
95	July 13	@ Cubs	10–7	Teherán (9–6)	Wood (7–8)	Kimbrel (29)	36,363	52–43	W2
	July 15	All-Star Game	NL 3–5 AL	Scherzer	Neshek	Perkins	41,048	Target Field	
96	July 18	Phillies	6–4	Santana (8–6)	Burnett (6–9)	Kimbrel (30)	39,747	53–43	W3
97	July 19	Phillies	1–2	Hamels (4–5)	Simmons (1–1)	Papelbon (23)	38,602	53–44	L1
98	July 20	Phillies	8–2	Wood (7–7)	Kendrick (4–10)		24,859	54–44	W1
99	July 21	Marlins	1–3 (10)	Morris (7–0)	Simmons (1–2)	Cishek (22)	26,766	54–45	L1
100	July 22	Marlins	5–6	Turner (3–6)	Minor (3–6)	Cishek (23)	22,998	54–46	L2
101	July 23	Marlins	6–1	Santana (9–6)	Eovaldi (5–6)		20,102	55–46	W1
102	July 24	Marlins	2–3	Álvarez (7–5)	Kimbrel (0–2)	Cishek (24)	26,446	55–47	L1
103	July 25	Padres	2–5	Hahn (6–2)	Wood (7–8)	Benoit (2)	31,647	55–48	L2
104	July 26	Padres	5–3	Teherán (10–6)	Despaigne (2–2)	Kimbrel (31)	33,820	56–48	W1
105	July 27	Padres	8–3	Minor (4–6)	Stults (3–13)		31,456	57–48	W2
106	July 28	Padres	2–0	Santana (10–6)	Lane (0–1)	Kimbrel (32)	23,281	58–48	W3
107	July 29	@ Dodgers	4–8	League (2–2)	Varvaro (3–3)	Jansen (31)	49,630	58–49	L1
108	July 30	@ Dodgers	2–3 (10)	Howell (3–3)	Hale (3–3)		47,386	58–50	L2
109	July 31	@ Dodgers	1–2	Kershaw (13–2)	Teherán (10–7)		51,163	58–51	L3

August: 14–14 (Home: 8–5; Away: 6–9)

#	Date	Opponent	Score	Win	Loss	Save	Attendance	Record	Box/ Streak
110	August 1	@ Padres	1–10	Stults (4–13)	Minor (4–7)		33,779	58–52	L4
111	August 2	@ Padres	2–3 (12)	Stauffer (3–2)	Kimbrel (0–3)		39,402	58–53	L5
112	August 3	@ Padres	3–4 (10)	Stauffer (4–2)	Hale (3–4)		30,861	58–54	L6
113	August 5	@ Mariners	2–4	Hernández (12–3)	Wood (7–9)	Rodney (31)	24,496	58–55	L7
114	August 6	@ Mariners	3–7	Young (10–6)	Teherán (10–8)		30,770	58–56	L8
115	August 8	Nationals	7–6	Santana (11–6)	Strasburg (8–10)	Kimbrel (33)	32,707	59–56	W1
116	August 9	Nationals	1–4 (11)	Clippard (7–2)	Carpenter (4–2)	Soriano (26)	36,832	59–57	L1
117	August 10	Nationals	3–1	Wood (8–9)	Gonzalez (6–9)	Kimbrel (34)	18,191	60–57	W1
118	August 11	Dodgers	2–6	Correia (6–13)	Teherán (10–9)		20,052	60–58	L1
119	August 12	Dodgers	2–4	Haren (10–9)	Minor (4–8)	Jansen (33)	31,904	60–59	L2
120	August 13	Dodgers	3–2	Santana (12–6)	Ryu (13–6)	Kimbrel (35)	33,299	61–59	W1
121	August 14	Dodgers	4–6	Hernández (7–8)	Harang (9–7)	Jansen (34)	19,347	61–60	L1
122	August 15	Athletics	7–2	Wood (9–9)	Hammel (9–10)		30,606	62–60	W1
123	August 16	Athletics	4–3	Teherán (11–9)	Gray (12–7)	Kimbrel (36)	40,760	63–60	W2
124	August 17	Athletics	4–3	Minor (5–8)	Lester (13–8)	Kimbrel (37)	25,461	64–60	W3
125	August 18	@ Pirates	7–3	Santana (13–6)	Worley (5–3)		31,669	65–60	W4
126	August 19	@ Pirates	11–3	Harang (10–7)	Liriano (3–10)		27,033	66–60	W5
127	August 20	@ Pirates	2–3	Melancon (2–3)	Carpenter (4–3)		26,581	66–61	L1
128	August 21	@ Reds	8–0	Teherán (12–9)	Holmberg (0–1)		20,243	67–61	W1
129	August 22	@ Reds	3–1 (12)	Hale (4–4)	Parra (0–1)	Kimbrel (38)	31,160	68–61	W2
130	August 23	@ Reds	0–1	Leake (10–11)	Santana (13–7)	Chapman (27)	41,502	68–62	L1
131	August 24	@ Reds	3–5	Simón (13–8)	Harang (10–8)	Broxton (8)	29,422	68–63	L2
132	August 26	@ Mets	2–3	Gee (5–6)	Wood (9–10)	Mejía (19)	22,406	68–64	L3
133	August 27	@ Mets	3–2	Teherán (13–9)	Wheeler (9–9)	Kimbrel (39)	22,014	69–64	W1
134	August 28	@ Mets	6–1	Minor (6–8)	Niese (7–10)		22,154	70–64	W2
135	August 29	Marlins	5–2	Carpenter (5–3)	Hatcher (0–2)	Kimbrel (40)	26,278	71–64	W3
136	August 30	Marlins	0–4	Cosart (3–1)	Harang (10–9)		25,335	71–65	L1
137	August 31	Marlins	1–0	Wood (10–10)	Eovaldi (6–10)	Kimbrel (41)	45,754	72–65	W1

September: 7–18 (Home: 3–10; Away: 4–8)

#	Date	Opponent	Score	Win	Loss	Save	Attendance	Record	Box/ Streak
138	September 1	Phillies	0–7	Hamels (8–6)	Teherán (13–10)		34,178	72–66	L1
139	September 2	Phillies	0–4	Kendrick (8–11)	Minor (6–9)		19,444	72–67	L2
140	September 3	Phillies	7–4	Santana (14–7)	Hollands (1–1)	Kimbrel (42)	19,724	73–67	W1
141	September 5	@ Marlins	3–11	Cosart (13–8)	Harang (10–10)		19,951	73–68	L1
142	September 6	@ Marlins	4–3 (10)	Carpenter (6–3)	Morris (6–1)	Kimbrel (43)	25,485	74–68	W1
143	September 7	@ Marlins	0–4	Hand (3–6)	Teherán (13–11)		20,013	74–69	L1
144	September 8	@ Nationals	1–2	Fister (13–6)	Minor (6–10)	Storen (3)	25,448	74–70	L2
145	September 9	@ Nationals	4–6	Zimmermann (11–5)	Santana (14-8)	Storen (4)	29,233	74–71	L3
146	September 10	@ Nationals	6–2	Harang (11–10)	Strasburg (11-11)		31,086	75–71	W1
147	September 12	@ Rangers	1–2	Klein (1–2)	Carpenter (6–4)	Feliz (9)	27,547	75–72	L1
148	September 13	@ Rangers	2–3	Bonilla (1–0)	Teherán (13–12)	Cotts (1)	31,595	75–73	L2
149	September 14	@ Rangers	3–10	Lewis (10–13)	Minor (6–11)		25,449	75–74	L3
150	September 15	Nationals	2–4	Strasburg (12–11)	Santana (14-9)	Storen (6)	18,220	75–75	L4
151	September 16	Nationals	0–3	Roark (14–10)	Harang (11-11)	Storen (7)	28,175	75–76	L5
152	September 17	Nationals	3–1	Wood (11–10)	Detwiler (2–3)	Kimbrel (44)	26,643	76–76	W1
153	September 19	Mets	0–5	Wheeler (11–10)	Teherán (13–13)		35,693	76–77	L1
154	September 20	Mets	2–4	Niese (9–11)	Minor (6–12)	Mejía (27)	33,794	76–78	L2
155	September 21	Mets	2–10	deGrom (9–6)	Santana (14–10)		35,354	76–79	L3
156	September 22	Pirates	0–1	Liriano (7-10)	Harang (11-12)	Melancon (32)	20,252	76-80	L4
157	September 23	Pirates	2–3	Cole (11-5)	Wood (11–11)	Watson (2)	23,029	76-81	L5
158	September 24	Pirates	6–2	Teherán (14-13)	Locke (7-6)		25,457	77-81	W1
159	September 25	Pirates	1–10	Volquez (13-7)	Hale (4-5)		35,140	77-82	L1
160	September 26	@ Phillies	4–5	García (1-0)	Walden (0-2)	Papelbon (39)	33,121	77-83	L2
161	September 27	@ Phillies	4–2	Harang (12-12)	Burnett (8-18)	Kimbrel (46)	33,761	78-83	W1
162	September 28	@ Phillies	2–1	Avilán (4-1)	Hamels (9-9)	Kimbrel (47)	38,082	79-83	W2

== Farm system ==
Level	Team	League	Manager
AAA	Gwinnett Braves	International League	Brian Snitker
AA	Mississippi Braves	Southern League	Aaron Holbert
A	Lynchburg Hillcats	Carolina League	Luis Salazar
A	Rome Braves	South Atlantic League	Jonathan Schuerholz
Rookie	Danville Braves	Appalachian League	Randy Ingle
Rookie	GCL Braves	Gulf Coast League	Rocket Wheeler
