= Chris Ellis (baseball) =

American baseball player (born 1992)

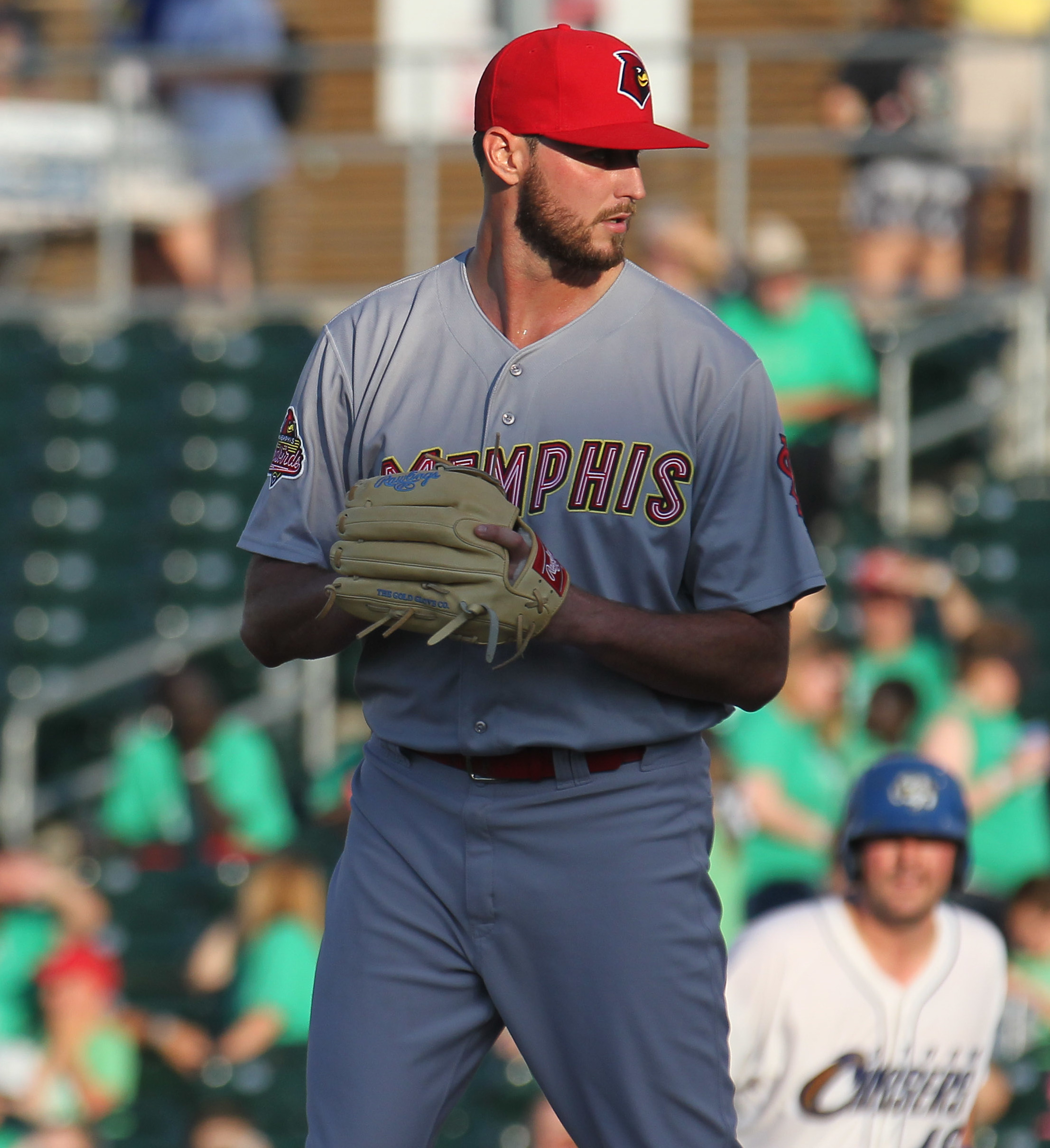
- Ellis with the Memphis Redbirds in 2018

Sultanes de Monterrey – No. 75
- Pitcher
- Born: September 22, 1992 (age 33); Birmingham, Alabama, U.S.
- Bats: Right Throws: Right

MLB debut
- March 31, 2019, for the Kansas City Royals

MLB statistics (through 2022 season)
- Win–loss record: 1–0
- Earned run average: 3.12
- Strikeouts: 25
- Stats at Baseball Reference

Teams
- Kansas City Royals (2019); Tampa Bay Rays (2021); Baltimore Orioles (2021–2022)

Christopher John Ellis (born September 22, 1992) is an American professional baseball pitcher for the Sultanes de Monterrey of the Mexican League. He has previously played in Major League Baseball (MLB) for the Kansas City Royals, Tampa Bay Rays, and Baltimore Orioles.

== Career ==
=== Amateur ===
Ellis was drafted by the Los Angeles Dodgers in the 50th round of the 2011 Major League Baseball draft out of Spain Park High School in Hoover, Alabama. He did not sign with the Dodgers and attended the University of Mississippi (Ole Miss) to play college baseball. In 2013, he played collegiate summer baseball with the Cotuit Kettleers of the Cape Cod Baseball League.

=== Los Angeles Angels ===
Ellis was selected by the Los Angeles Angels of Anaheim in the third round of the 2014 MLB draft. He signed and made his professional debut with the rookie-level Orem Owlz where he pitched to a 6.89 earned run average (ERA) in 15 2/3 innings pitched. Ellis started 2015 with the High-A Inland Empire 66ers, and after going 4–5 with a 3.88 ERA in 11 games, was promoted to the Double-A Arkansas Travelers, where he finished the season, posting a 7–4 win–loss record and 3.92 ERA in 15 games.

=== Atlanta Braves ===
On November 12, 2015, the Angels traded Ellis, Sean Newcomb, Erick Aybar and cash to the Atlanta Braves in exchange for Andrelton Simmons and José Briceño. Ellis was assigned to the Double-A Mississippi Braves to start the 2016 season, and promoted to the Triple-A Gwinnett Braves in June. Ellis ended 2016 with a combined 12–9 record and 4.49 ERA in 28 total games started between both clubs. After the 2016 season, the Braves assigned Ellis to the Salt River Rafters of the Arizona Fall League.

=== St. Louis Cardinals ===
On December 1, 2016, the Braves traded Ellis, John Gant, and Luke Dykstra to the St. Louis Cardinals in exchange for Jaime García. Ellis spent 2017 with both the Double-A Springfield Cardinals and Triple- A Memphis Redbirds, posting a combined 7–12 record with a 5.29 ERA in 30 games (22 starts) between both teams. He returned to Springfield to begin the 2018 season and was promoted to Memphis during the season. In 31 games (21 starts) between the two clubs, Ellis compiled a 10–4 record with a 3.93 ERA.

=== Kansas City Royals ===
On December 13, 2018, the Texas Rangers selected Ellis in the 2018 Rule 5 draft and traded him to the Kansas City Royals. Ellis made the Royals' Opening Day roster. He made his major league debut on March 31, 2019, versus the Chicago White Sox, recording one scoreless inning of relief. On April 3, 2019, Ellis was designated for assignment.

=== St. Louis Cardinals (second stint) ===
On April 9, 2019, the Royals returned Ellis to the Cardinals organization. In 40 relief appearances for the Triple–A Memphis Redbirds, he compiled a 5–5 record and 7.18 ERA with 82 strikeouts across 79 innings pitched. Ellis did not play in a game in 2020 due to the cancellation of the minor league season because of the COVID-19 pandemic. He was released by the Cardinals organization on May 27, 2020.

=== Tampa Bay Rays ===
On December 16, 2020, Ellis signed a minor league contract with the Tampa Bay Rays organization. On August 16, 2021, Ellis's contract was selected by the Rays. In his Rays debut, Ellis pitched 4 scoreless innings, while striking out 7 batters. The following day, August 18, Ellis was designated for assignment by the Rays.

=== Baltimore Orioles ===
On August 20, 2021, Ellis was claimed off of waivers by the Baltimore Orioles. Ellis posted a 2.49 ERA in six starts for Baltimore, striking out 16 in 25 1/3 innings of work. On November 5, Ellis was outrighted off of the 40-man roster and elected free agency.

On March 16, 2022, the Orioles re-signed Ellis on a minor league contract. The Orioles promoted him to the major leagues on April 19. On May 4, Ellis underwent arthroscopic shoulder surgery, ending his 2022 season. On October 30, Ellis was removed from the 40-man roster and sent outright to the Triple–A Norfolk Tides. However, Ellis elected free agency in lieu of the outright assignment on November 1.

=== Arizona Diamondbacks ===
On April 10, 2024, Ellis signed with the Long Island Ducks of the Atlantic League of Professional Baseball. However, prior to the start of the season on April 25, Ellis' contract was purchased by the Arizona Diamondbacks organization. In 15 starts for the Triple–A Reno Aces, he struggled to a 2–7 record and 9.09 ERA with 44 strikeouts across 64 1/3 innings pitched. Ellis was released by the Diamondbacks organization on July 24.

=== Long Island Ducks ===
On August 1, 2024, Ellis signed with the Long Island Ducks of the Atlantic League of Professional Baseball. In 7 starts for Long Island, he compiled a 1–1 record and 5.45 ERA with 41 strikeouts over 34 2/3 innings of work. He became a free agent following the season.

=== Sultanes de Monterrey ===
On April 15, 2025, Ellis signed with the Sultanes de Monterrey of the Mexican League. He made 39 appearances for Monterrey, compiling an 0-2 record and 3.66 ERA with 37 strikeouts and 19 saves across 39 1/3 innings pitched.

== See also ==
- Rule 5 draft results
