= David Hale (baseball) =

American baseball player (born 1987)

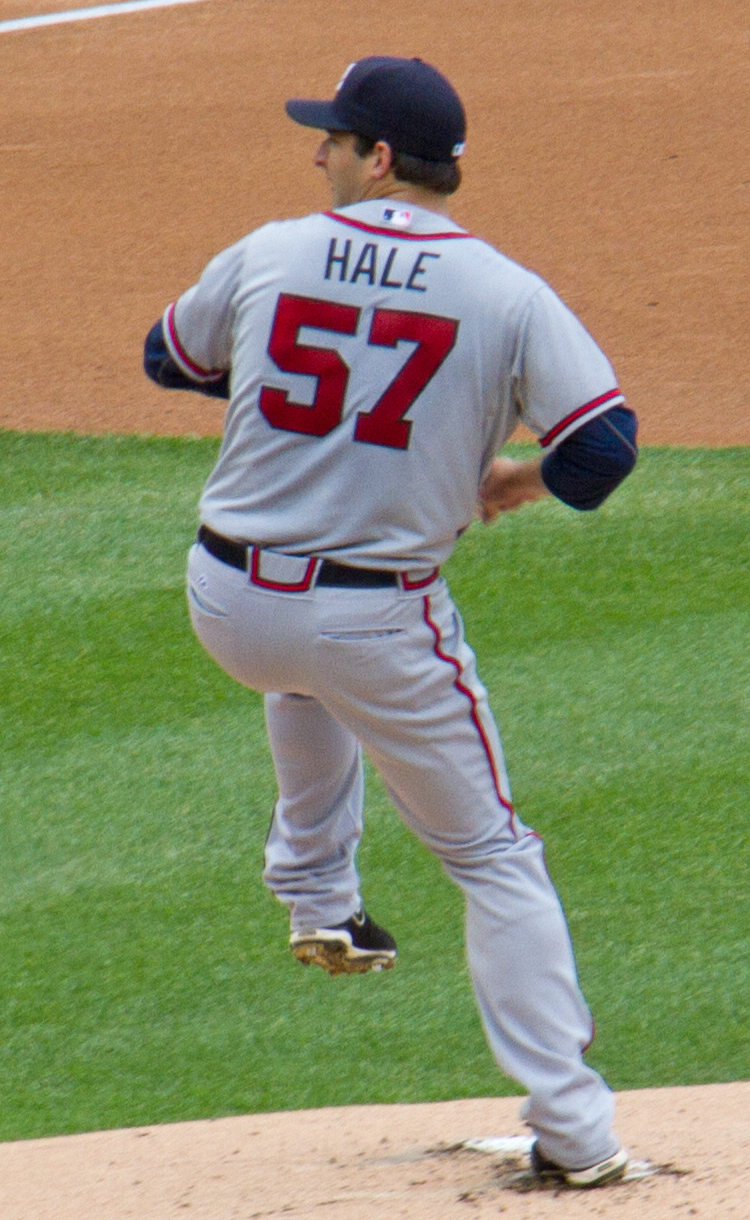
- Hale with the Atlanta Braves
- Pitcher
- Born: September 27, 1987 (age 39); Atlanta, Georgia, U.S.
- Batted: Right Threw: Right

Professional debut
- MLB: September 13, 2013, for the Atlanta Braves
- KBO: July 24, 2018, for the Hanwha Eagles

Last appearance
- KBO: October 10, 2018, for the Hanwha Eagles
- MLB: June 23, 2021, for the Philadelphia Phillies

MLB statistics
- Win–loss record: 13–12
- Earned run average: 4.44
- Strikeouts: 186

KBO statistics
- Win–loss record: 3–4
- Earned run average: 4.34
- Strikeouts: 55
- Stats at Baseball Reference

Teams
- Atlanta Braves (2013–2014); Colorado Rockies (2015–2016); New York Yankees (2018); Minnesota Twins (2018); New York Yankees (2018); Hanwha Eagles (2018); New York Yankees (2019–2020); Philadelphia Phillies (2020–2021)

David Edward Hale (born September 27, 1987) is an American former professional baseball pitcher. He played in Major League Baseball (MLB) for the Atlanta Braves, Colorado Rockies, Minnesota Twins, New York Yankees, and Philadelphia Phillies, and in the KBO League for the Hanwha Eagles.

Growing up in Marietta, Georgia, Hale played high school baseball for The Walker School. He was primarily an infielder, but began to pitch during his senior year. Although his performance drew attention from MLB scouts, Hale chose to honor his commitment to play college baseball for Princeton University. He spent three years with Princeton before the Braves selected him in the third round of the 2009 MLB draft. Hale spent several seasons in the Braves' farm system, alternating between the starting rotation and the bullpen before making his major league debut in September 2013.

The Braves traded Hale to the Rockies in 2015 in exchange for two catching prospects, and Colorado's subsequent acquisition of Eric Stults pushed Hale back into the minor leagues. Hale was designated for assignment in April 2016 and spent the remainder of the year playing for the Baltimore Orioles' Triple-A affiliate. Throughout 2017 and 2018, Hale signed a series of minor-league contracts and made brief major league appearances with the Yankees and Twins. After being designated for assignment four times in one year, he spent the final part of the 2018 season with the Eagles. Hale returned to the Yankees in 2019, but his season was derailed due to a pair of injuries, and he spent the better part of the 2020 season in the farm system. Hale was traded to the Phillies in August 2020, but was designated for assignment in June 2021.

== Early life ==
Hale was born on September 27, 1987, in Atlanta, Georgia. He is the oldest son of David Hale, an aerospace engineer, and Mary Hale, a nurse. Hale grew up in Marietta, Georgia with his parents and two younger siblings, Matthew and Morgan. Hale played high school baseball at The Walker School in Marietta. Primarily an infielder, Hale committed to play college baseball at Princeton University before his senior year. As a senior, however, Hale began to pitch for Walker, and he drew the interest of professional baseball scouts. As a junior, Hale had a .532 batting average (BA) and was named The Walker School's top offensive player. As a senior, he hit 10 home runs and was named the team's most valuable player.

== College career ==
Although Hale's high school career drew interest from Major League Baseball (MLB) scouts, he decided to attend college instead, telling The Atlanta Journal-Constitution that "I can't give up going to (college) for that, in the rounds they were talking about. I wasn't going to pass up (Princeton) for the amount of money they were talking about." Princeton head coach Scott Bradley referred to Hale as "the first legitimate two-way player that we have had in my time at Princeton" and intended to use him as both a pitcher and a fielder.

Hale made his college debut in a season-opening doubleheader against Elon University, recording three hits and one run batted in (RBI) in an extra innings 8–7 loss. Later that season, Hale pitched a complete game in the first game of a doubleheader against Cornell University. Although Princeton won 7–5, they lost the second game in extra innings and were eliminated from playoff contention. As a pitcher, Hale finished his freshman season with a 3–2 win–loss record and a 4.71 earned run average (ERA) in 42 innings pitched. As a batter, he had a .200 average with 11 hits, five RBI, and one home run in 55 at bats. At the end of the year, Hale was one of three Princeton Tigers named to the New Jersey All-Rookie team.

The following year, Hale started his season with a win, allowing three runs and striking out six batters in 3 2/3 innings in a 6–4 victory over the University of Delaware on March 2, 2008. Later that month, he earned another complete game win in a 3–2 rout of Harvard University. In the final game of the season, Hale hit a grand slam in the second inning of a 14–3 win over Rider University. He had a .339 batting average for the season, with 40 hits, five home runs, and 29 RBIs in 118 at bats. As a pitcher, Hale posted a 2–4 record and a 5.04 ERA with 47 strikeouts in 44 2/3 innings pitched. That summer, Hale played collegiate summer baseball with the Chatham A's of the Cape Cod Baseball League.

Hale returned to Princeton in 2009 and opened his junior season with a series against William & Mary. In the first game, he batted a team-high three RBIs as part of a bases-loaded double in the fifth inning. The next day, he received a no decision, as all four runs that Princeton gave up while he was pitching were unearned. Hale was named Ivy League Co-Pitcher of the Week twice in 2009. For the week of March 24, he earned the honor for posting a 0.00 ERA in his first 13 innings of the season, including eight innings in one week with no earned runs. During the week of April 28, he pitched a career-high 10 strikeouts in a shutout victory against Cornell. Hale finished his junior season with a 2–3 record, a 4.43 ERA, and 47 strikeouts in 40 2/3 innings pitched, as well as a .284 average, including 29 hits, one home run, and 12 RBI, in 102 at bats.

Across his three-year career at Princeton, Hale posted a 7–9 record, a 4.74 ERA, and 120 strikeouts in 127 1/3 innings pitched. Additionally, he had a .291 career batting average, including 80 hits, seven home runs, and 46 RBIs, in 275 at bats.

== Professional career ==
=== Minor league career (2009–2013) ===
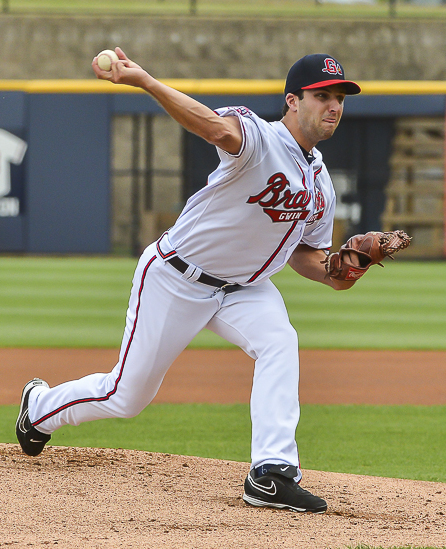
Hale pitching for the Gwinnett Braves in 2013

Following his junior season at Princeton, the Atlanta Braves selected Hale in the third round, 87th overall, of the 2009 MLB draft. At the time, he was Baseball America's highest-ranked prospect in the Ivy League, and was the highest-drafted pitcher in Princeton history. After signing with the team that July for a $405,000 signing bonus, Hale reported to the Rookie League Danville Braves. In seven appearances for Danville, he went 2–1 with a 1.13 ERA.

In 2010, Hale was assigned to the Class A Rome Braves. He struggled as a starting pitcher with Rome, giving up three runs and making a fielding error in his first inning with the team and seeing his ERA climb to 7.99 in his first six starts. On May 19, he was moved to the bullpen, where his performance began to improve, and he spent the rest of the year as a long reliever. In 93 2/3 innings with Rome in 2010, Hale posted a 5–8 record and a 4.13 ERA, with four of those losses coming from his first six starts.

Hale spent the following season with the Class A-Advanced Lynchburg Hillcats. Unlike the previous season, where he became a reliever after struggling as a starting pitcher, Hale found success in the Lynchburg starting rotation after a poor bullpen performance. On July 30, 2011, in one of his best outings of the year, Hale pitched seven shutout innings against the Salem Red Sox but was credited with a no decision when the bullpen gave up six runs in the final two innings. Hale posted a 4–6 record in 2011, with a 4.10 ERA and 86 strikeouts in 101 innings and 28 games, including 13 starts, three games finished, and one complete game.

The following year, Hale was assigned to the Double-A Mississippi Braves of the Southern League. After posting a 4–3 record and a 4.36 ERA in his first 12 starts, Hale was named to the South Division All-Star Team on June 11, 2012, replacing pitcher Donnie Joseph after the latter was recalled to the Triple-A Louisville Bats. Hale went 8–4 for the year in Mississippi, with a 3.77 ERA and 124 strikeouts in 145 2/3 innings across 27 games, all starts. That November, Hale was one of five players added to the Braves' 40-man roster in order to be protected from the Rule 5 draft.

Hale opened the 2013 season with the Triple-A Gwinnett Braves. Despite missing the second half of April and almost all of May with a strained right shoulder, Hale had a strong season with Gwinnett. He won three consecutive starts between July 20 and August 1, posting a 2.00 ERA in that span. With Gwinnett, Hale was 6–9 with a 3.22 ERA in 22 games, 20 of which were starts. He recorded 76 strikeouts in 114 2/3 innings.

=== Atlanta Braves (2013–14) ===
Hale was recalled to the Braves on September 5, 2013. He made his major-league debut on September 13, recording nine strikeouts in five innings against the San Diego Padres. Though this was the most of any Braves pitcher in his debut, the Braves went on to lose the game 4–3. One of the batters he faced was fellow Princeton grad Will Venable. The only previous times that two Princeton alumni had faced each other in an MLB game were two instances in which Venable batted against Ross Ohlendorf. After the conclusion of the regular season, Hale was one of 11 pitchers named to the Braves' 2013 playoff roster. He made a postseason appearance in the third game of the 2013 National League Division Series (NLDS), pitching in relief during the Braves' 2–1 loss to the Los Angeles Dodgers. In his rookie season with the Braves, Hale posted a 1–0 record with a 0.82 ERA and 14 strikeouts in 11 innings.

Going into the 2014 season, Hale was named the Braves' fourth starter in a five-man rotation also including Julio Teheran, Alex Wood, Aaron Harang, and Ervin Santana. At the end of April, Mike Minor returned to the starting rotation, and Hale, who went 1–0 with a 2.31 ERA in four starts, was subsequently moved to the bullpen. Hale made two more starting appearances later in the season, first in the second game of a doubleheader against the Philadelphia Phillies on June 28, and then in the Braves' home finale against the Pirates on September 25. He made 45 total appearances that season, starting six and finishing 13, and posted a 4–5 record with a 3.30 ERA and 44 strikeouts in 87 1/3 innings.

=== Colorado Rockies (2015–16) ===
On January 30, 2015, the Braves traded Hale and fellow right-handed pitcher Gus Schlosser to the Colorado Rockies in exchange for minor league catchers Jose Briceno and Chris O'Dowd. Although Hale was expected to compete for a spot in the Braves' 2015 starting rotation, the later signing of Eric Stults took him out of contention. Hale was assigned to the Triple-A Albuquerque Isotopes to begin 2015, where, after a rough start, his performance steadily improved. Hale was recalled to the Rockies on June 2, pitching that day in the second game of a doubleheader against the Dodgers. He gave up three home runs early in the game, but improved over the remainder of his six-inning performance as Colorado lost 9–8. He spent over a month on the disabled list with a left groin strain, missing games between July 10 and August 18. In 17 games with the Rockies that season, including 12 starts, Hale posted a 5–5 record and a 6.09 ERA, with 61 strikeouts in 78 1/3 innings.

Hale made only two appearances for the Rockies in 2016, both in relief. He gave up three runs in 1 2/3 innings on April 16, and allowed a hit and an out three days later. In only two innings of work, Hale climbed to an ERA of 13.50 with the Rockies. He was designated for assignment on April 22.

=== Minor league journeyman (2016–2018) ===
==== Baltimore Orioles ====
On April 25, 2016, Hale was claimed off waivers by the Baltimore Orioles. He was subsequently optioned to the Triple-A Norfolk Tides. He struggled at first with Norfolk, surrendering 12 earned runs in three straight starts and seeing his ERA rise to 5.71. However, on August 1, he pitched 6 2/3 shutout innings against the Durham Bulls. In 20 appearances with Norfolk, all starts, Hale posted a 4–7 record and a 5.84 ERA, with 56 strikeouts in 94 innings. He elected free agency following the season on November 7.

==== Atlanta Braves (second stint) ====
Hale signed a minor league contract with the Atlanta Braves organization prior to the 2017 season but was released in March.

==== Los Angeles Dodgers ====
On April 10, 2017, Hale signed a minor league contract with the Los Angeles Dodgers. Hale split his time between the Double-A Tulsa Drillers and the Triple-A Oklahoma City Dodgers. Pitching in 15 games, he posted a 5–4 record with a 4.74 ERA and struck out 60 batters in 81 2/3 innings of work. In three of Hale's starts with Oklahoma City, fellow Princeton graduate Jack Murphy caught for him. He elected free agency following the season on November 6.

==== New York Yankees ====
OI January 29, 2018, Hale signed a minor league contract with the New York Yankees, and was assigned to begin the season with the Triple-A Scranton/Wilkes-Barre RailRiders. After three starts for the RailRiders, in which he posted a 5.52 ERA in 14 2/3 innings of work, the Yankees selected Hale's contract and promoted him to the major leagues as a long reliever on April 22. He was designated for assignment on April 24 in order to clear room on the roster for A. J. Cole.

==== Minnesota Twins ====
On April 26, 2018, the Minnesota Twins claimed Hale off of waivers Hale made his Twins debut the next day, giving up four runs in a 15–9 loss to the Cincinnati Reds, and was designated for assignment the next day. He elected free agency on April 30.

==== New York Yankees (second stint) ====
On May 1, 2018, Hale signed a minor league contract with the New York Yankees. and was promoted to the majors the following day. However, he was designated for the Yankees a second time on May 15 and elected free agency. Hale again re-signed with the Yankees the next day and was promoted to the major league roster on July 1 after spending June with the Triple-A Scranton/Wilkes-Barre RailRiders. He was once again designated for assignment on July 7, and again on July 10 when he elected free agency.

=== Hanwha Eagles (2018) ===
On July 13, 2018, the Hanwha Eagles of the Korea Baseball Organization (KBO) signed Hale to a US$500,000 deal for the remainder of the season. He told reporters after the season that he was nervous about joining a KBO team because of the lifestyle changes that living abroad would require, as well as his inexperience with the Korean language, but that he was aided in the transition by having two American teammates, Keyvius Sampson and Jared Hoying. In 12 starts for Hanwha, Hale went 3–4 with a 4.34 ERA.

=== New York Yankees (third stint) (2019–2020) ===
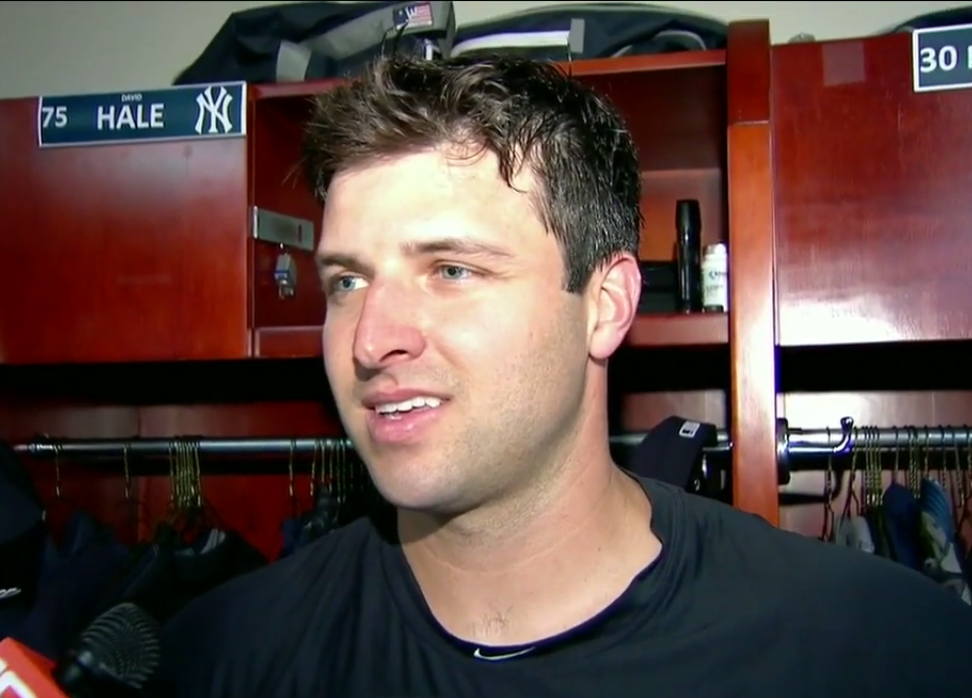
Hale being interviewed after recording his first career save in 2019

Just before spring training began in 2019, on February 1, Hale signed another minor league contract with the New York Yankees organization. He started the season in the RailRiders' rotation, going 3–2 with a 4.13 ERA in his first seven starts, but was called up to the major leagues in late May after Nestor Cortes Jr. was sent down to the minors. He recorded his first MLB career save on May 21, after giving up one run in four innings of an 11–4 victory against the Orioles. On August 1, Hale was placed on the 10-day disabled list with a lumbar spine strain. He was transferred to the 60-day injured list at the start of September after suffering a knee injury during an August 22 rehab assignment. In 37 1/3 bullpen innings with the Yankees in 2019, Hale posted a 2.89 ERA. After defeating the Twins to advance to the 2019 American League Championship Series (ALCS), the Yankees designated Hale for assignment when Aaron Hicks and CC Sabathia were added to the postseason roster.

On February 3, 2020, Hale was one of 14 players signed to a minor-league contract by the Yankees with an invitation to spring training in Tampa, Florida. As spring training ended early and the beginning of the 2020 MLB season was delayed due to the COVID-19 pandemic, Hale was briefly released and re-signed by the Yankees at the beginning of April in order to rewrite the opt-out clause of his contract, which had been written around the assumption of a regular season. Hale's contract was selected and he was added to the 40-man roster on July 21, shortly before the start of the pandemic-delayed season. He was designated for assignment on August 17, after making five relief appearances for the Yankees and allowing two earned runs in six innings.

=== Philadelphia Phillies (2020–2021) ===
On August 21, 2020, the Phillies acquired Hale from the Yankees in exchange for reliever Addison Russ. He spent the remainder of the shortened season with the Phillies, recording a 4.09 ERA in six appearances and striking out seven batters in 11 innings of work. Between Philadelphia and New York, Hale posted a 3.71 ERA in the pandemic-shortened season, with 14 strikeouts in 17 total innings. After the season, Hale signed a one-year, $850,000 deal to remain with the Phillies.

Going into the 2021 season, Hale was expected to serve as a long reliever alongside veteran Vince Velasquez, due to concerns that starters Matt Moore and Chase Anderson would not regularly be able to pitch more than five innings. When Velasquez was scratched 30 minutes prior to the Phillies' May 20 match against the Miami Marlins, Hale was called upon to start the game. Hale pitched in the first three innings of the bullpen game, giving up a solo home run to Miguel Rojas before he was replaced by Moore. The Phillies ultimately lost the game 6–0. After giving up five runs in two appearances, the Phillies designated Hale for assignment on June 25, 2021. Hale cleared waivers the following day and elected free agency.

== Pitcher profile ==
When the Phillies signed Hale, manager Joe Girardi referred to him as "a three-pitch guy that has a really good changeup". His pitch repertoire consists of a 93 mph (150 km/h) four-seam fastball, an 83 mph (134 km/h) changeup, and an 82 mph (132 km/h) curveball. Most of his professional career has been spent in the bullpen, with the Yankees utilizing Hale in a variety of relief roles.

== Personal life ==
Hale married his wife, Megan, on November 14, 2015. Their first child, Calder, was born on January 13, 2019.

Although he signed with the Braves before completing his undergraduate degree, Hale returned to Princeton during the offseason, graduating in 2011 with a bachelor's degree in operations research and financial engineering. He originally wanted his thesis at Princeton to examine stock-market indicators, but Hale's thesis advisor encouraged him to write on baseball instead. His thesis ultimately examined the statistics of pitchers before and after sustaining a serious injury.
