= Sean Newcomb =

American baseball player (born 1993)

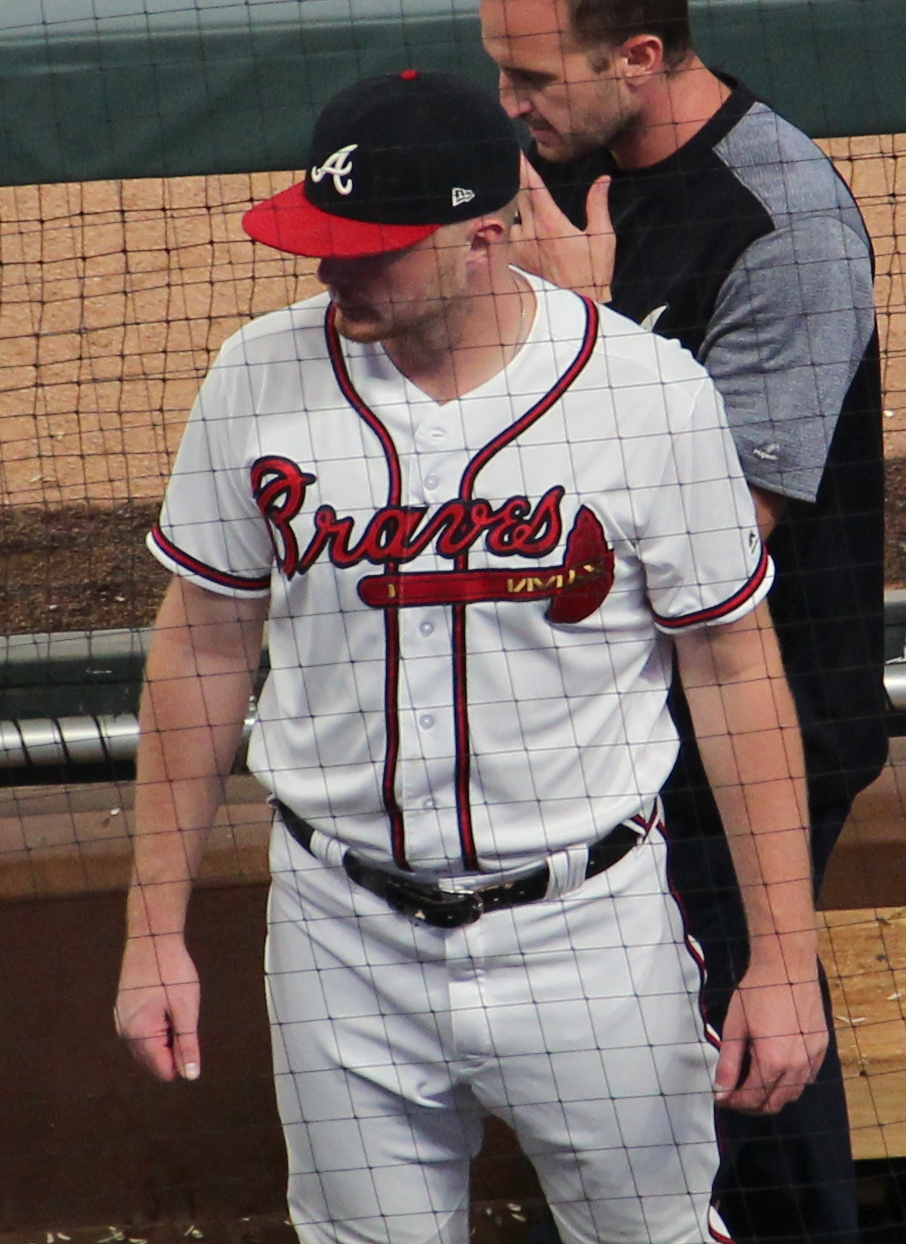
- Newcomb with the Atlanta Braves in 2018

Free agent
- Pitcher
- Born: June 12, 1993 (age 33); Brockton, Massachusetts, U.S.
- Bats: Left Throws: Left

MLB debut
- June 10, 2017, for the Atlanta Braves

MLB statistics (through 2026 season)
- Win–loss record: 32–35
- Earned run average: 4.03
- Strikeouts: 613
- Stats at Baseball Reference

Teams
- Atlanta Braves (2017–2022); Chicago Cubs (2022); Oakland Athletics (2023–2024); Boston Red Sox (2025); Athletics (2025); Chicago White Sox (2026)

Sean William Newcomb (born June 12, 1993) is an American professional baseball pitcher who is a free agent. He has played in Major League Baseball (MLB) for the Atlanta Braves, Chicago Cubs, Oakland Athletics, Boston Red Sox, and Chicago White Sox. He played college baseball at the University of Hartford. The Los Angeles Angels of Anaheim selected Newcomb in the first round of the 2014 MLB draft, and traded him to the Braves in 2015, for whom he made his MLB debut in 2017.

== Amateur career ==
Newcomb attended Middleborough High School in Middleborough, Massachusetts. As a senior, he had a 0.46 earned run average (ERA) with 110 strikeouts in 58 innings pitched.

After high school, Newcomb enrolled at the University of Hartford. As a freshman for the Hartford Hawks baseball team in 2012, Newcomb started nine games before suffering a season-ending injury. His first college win was a no-hitter against Yale. He finished the year with a 2–4 win–loss record with a 4.17 ERA and 45 strikeouts in 45 1/3 innings. As a sophomore in 2013, he started 12 of 13 games, going 5–4 with a 3.75 ERA and 92 strikeouts over 72 innings. In 2012 and 2013, he played collegiate summer baseball with the Wareham Gatemen of the Cape Cod Baseball League. Newcomb started his junior season without allowing a run through his first 39 2/3 innings. He finished the year 8–2 with a 1.25 ERA and 106 strikeouts in 93 1/3 innings. He was named the 2014 America East Pitcher of the Year, becoming the first Hawk to win a major conference award.

== Professional career ==
=== Los Angeles Angels ===
Newcomb was considered a top prospect for the 2014 Major League Baseball draft. He was drafted in the first round, 15th overall, by the Los Angeles Angels of Anaheim. He signed with the Angels, receiving a $2,518,000 signing bonus. Newcomb split his professional 2014 play between rookie ball and the Single–A Burlington Bees. The following year he began in lower A ball, was promoted to higher A, and by the end of July had already found himself with the Double–A Arkansas Travelers, barely over a year after he was drafted. He ended his first full season in professional baseball with a combined 2.38 ERA across 3 levels, finishing 2nd in minor league baseball with a total of 168 strikeouts.

=== Atlanta Braves ===
On November 12, 2015, the Angels traded Newcomb, Erick Aybar, Chris Ellis, and cash considerations to the Atlanta Braves for Andrelton Simmons and José Briceño. The Braves invited Newcomb to spring training, ultimately sending him back to Double–A, where he spent the 2016 season with the Mississippi Braves. While pitching in the Southern League, he posted 4.6 walks per nine innings with a 3.86 ERA.

Newcomb was again invited to spring training ahead of the 2017 season. He started the season with the Gwinnett Braves of the Triple–A International League. Newcomb pitched to a 2.97 ERA in 54 2/3 innings, alongside 74 strikeouts and 33 walks prior to his first promotion to the major leagues. He made his major league debut for the Braves on June 10, 2017 at SunTrust Park, starting against the New York Mets. He pitched 6 1/3 innings, allowing four hits, and the only run he allowed was unearned (due to his own error), to go with seven strikeouts. The Mets won the game 6-1 as the Mets teed off on the bullpen late, while Newcomb received a tough luck no decision. For the season, he was 4–9 with a 4.32 ERA.

2018 saw Newcomb entering as an established member of the rotation for the first time, as he spent the entire year with the major league club. On July 29, 2018, he took a no-hitter through 8 2/3 innings until Chris Taylor singled, as the Braves defeated the Los Angeles Dodgers 4–1. Newcomb finished the season with a 12-9 record and an ERA of 3.90, but struggled over his final fourteen starts, recording a 5.50 ERA over that span. Newcomb also made his first major league postseason appearance in 2018. He did not receive a decision in his one post season start or subsequent bullpen appearance, but posted a sterling 1.93 ERA.

Newcomb started the Braves' home opener at SunTrust Park in 2019. He faced the Chicago Cubs, pitching four innings of an 8–0 win. Newcomb completed the seventh inning in his next game against the Miami Marlins, but struggled against the New York Mets, leading to his demotion to the Gwinnett Stripers on April 14. Newcomb returned to the major league club on May 4, and made several relief appearances. He returned to the starting rotation to face the Philadelphia Philles on June 15, 2019. Newcomb was struck in the head by a batted ball from J. T. Realmuto, and left the game. He was subsequently placed on the seven-day injured list. Newcomb was reactivated on June 25, and faced the Chicago Cubs as a reliever that night.

Newcomb endured an abysmal 2020 season, registering an 11.20 ERA in 13.2 innings pitched across 4 games, striking out 10.

In 2021 with the Braves he was 2–0 with one save and a 4.73 ERA, as in 32 relief appearances he pitched 32.1 innings, walked 27 batters, and struck out 43 batters. The Braves finished with an 88–73 record, clinching the NL East, and eventually won the 2021 World Series, giving the Braves their first title since 1995.

Newcomb was designated for assignment by the Braves on April 19, 2022.

=== Chicago Cubs ===
On April 20, 2022, Newcomb was traded to the Chicago Cubs in exchange for Jesse Chavez and cash considerations. After spending time on the injured list with a left ankle sprain, he was activated on June 13. Newcomb allowed five runs in an inning of work in an 18–4 loss against the New York Yankees and was designated for assignment after the game. On June 20, Newcomb was outrighted to the Triple-A Iowa Cubs.

On August 4, Newcomb was selected back to the active roster to start the second game of a doubleheader against the St. Louis Cardinals. On September 17, Newcomb was once again designated for assignment by the Cubs. He cleared waivers and was sent outright to Triple–A Iowa on September 19. He elected free agency on October 6.

=== San Francisco Giants ===
On February 6, 2023, Newcomb signed a minor league contract with the San Francisco Giants organization. In 20 appearances split between the Single–A San Jose Giants and Triple–A Sacramento River Cats, he registered a cumulative 3.15 ERA with 45 strikeouts in 34 1/3 innings pitched.

=== Oakland Athletics ===
On August 22, 2023, Newcomb was traded to the Oakland Athletics in exchange for Trenton Brooks. The next day, Oakland selected Newcomb's contract, adding him to the major league roster. After posting a 3.00 ERA across 7 appearances for Oakland, Newcomb was placed on the injured list with a sprained left knee on September 17. On September 20, it was announced that Newcomb had undergone left knee lateral meniscus surgery, ending his season; he was transferred to the 60-day injured list the same day.

On November 2, 2023, Newcomb signed a one–year, $1 million contract extension with the Athletics. On December 20, Newcomb underwent an arthroscopic surgery on his right knee, with the procedure projected to have him ready for game action by spring training. He was placed on the 60-day injured list to begin the 2024 season after getting behind schedule in his recovery process. Newcomb was activated from the injured list on June 4, 2024. On June 21, Newcomb became the first pitcher in Athletics' history to earn a win without officially facing a batter. With the A's trailing the Minnesota Twins 5–4 in the eighth inning, Newcomb entered in relief of Lucas Erceg with a runner on first and two outs. Newcomb picked off Austin Martin at first to end the inning; Oakland eventually took the lead later in the inning and won the game 6–5. In 7 games, he struggled to a 6.30 ERA with 7 strikeouts across 10 innings of work. Newcomb was designated for assignment by Oakland on July 2. He was released by the organization on July 5.

=== Boston Red Sox ===
On January 14, 2025, Newcomb signed a minor league contract with his hometown Boston Red Sox, the team for which he rooted in childhood. On March 27, the Red Sox selected Newcomb's contract after he made the team's Opening Day roster. Newcomb entered the year as the fifth starter, mainly due to injuries to other Red Sox pitchers. He pitched four innings and gave up four runs on eight hits in his first start of the season, against the Baltimore Orioles. Once the Red Sox rotation began to heal, Newcomb moved to the bullpen, serving mainly in the long relief role. In 11 appearances (5 starts) for Boston, he posted an 0–4 record and 3.83 ERA with 41 strikeouts over 40 innings of work. On May 24, Newcomb was designated for assignment by the Red Sox.

=== Athletics ===
On May 27, 2025, Newcomb was traded to the Athletics in exchange for cash considerations. In 36 appearances for the Athletics, he posted a 2-1 record and 1.75 ERA with 50 strikeouts and two saves across 51 1/3 innings pitched. On September 20, Newcomb was placed on the injured list due to left elbow inflammation, officially ending his season.

=== Chicago White Sox ===
On December 23, 2025, Newcomb signed a one-year, $4.5 million contract with the Chicago White Sox.

== Personal life ==
Newcomb was a fan of the Boston Red Sox growing up.
