= José Briceño =

Venezuelan baseball player (born 1992)

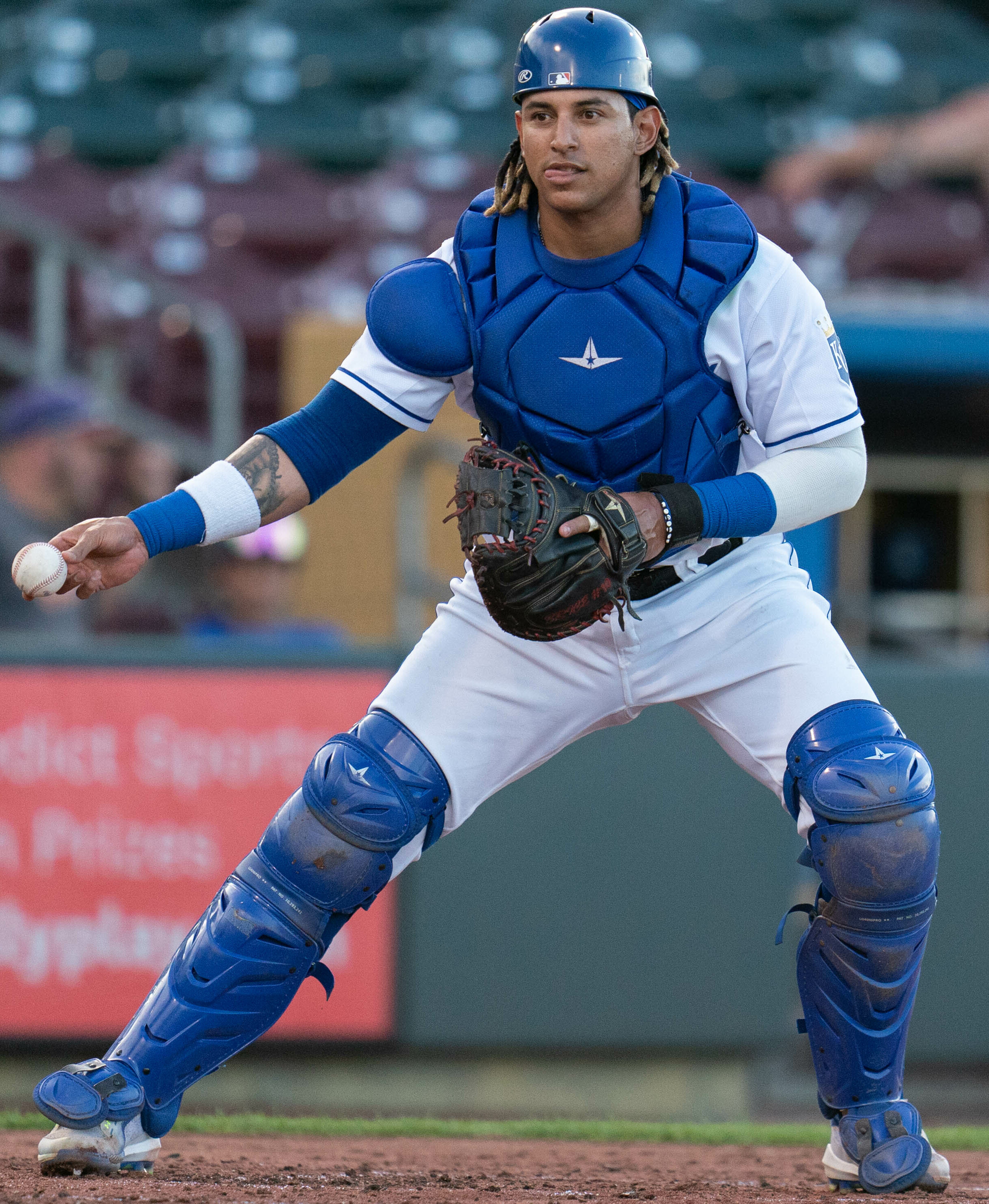
- Briceño with the Omaha Storm Chasers in 2022
- Catcher
- Born: September 19, 1992 (age 33); Caracas, Venezuela
- Batted: Right Threw: Right

MLB debut
- May 26, 2018, for the Los Angeles Angels

Last MLB appearance
- September 5, 2020, for the Los Angeles Angels

MLB statistics
- Batting average: .238
- Home runs: 5
- Runs batted in: 10
- Stats at Baseball Reference

Teams
- Los Angeles Angels (2018, 2020)

José Manuel Briceño (born September 19, 1992) is a Venezuelan former professional baseball catcher. He played in Major League Baseball (MLB) for the Los Angeles Angels.

== Career ==
Briceño was born in Caracas, Venezuela.

=== Colorado Rockies ===
He was signed on May 29, 2010, by the Colorado Rockies and was assigned to the DSL Rockies. In 2013, he played for the Asheville Tourists, Tri-City Dust Devils, and Grand Junction Rockies. He spent the 2014 season with the Tourists in Asheville.

=== Atlanta Braves ===
The Rockies traded Briceño and catcher Chris O'Dowd to the Atlanta Braves for pitchers David Hale and Gus Schlosser on January 30, 2015. Briceño spent the season with the Carolina Mudcats.

=== Los Angeles Angels ===
The Braves traded Briceño and Andrelton Simmons to the Los Angeles Angels for Erick Aybar, Sean Newcomb, Chris Ellis and cash on November 12, 2015.

Briceño played 2016 with the Inland Empire 66ers, Arkansas Travelers and Salt Lake Bees. He was invited to Spring Training for the 2017 season. After failing to make the team, Briceño spent 2017 with the Bees and the Mobile BayBears. Briceño was again invited to Spring Training in 2018, and again failed to make the team and was reassigned to Salt Lake.

He was called up to the majors for the first time on May 20, 2018.

In 2018 in Triple–A, he batted .277/.297/.536 with 8 home runs and 25 RBIs in 112 at bats for the Salt Lake Bees in the Pacific Coast League.

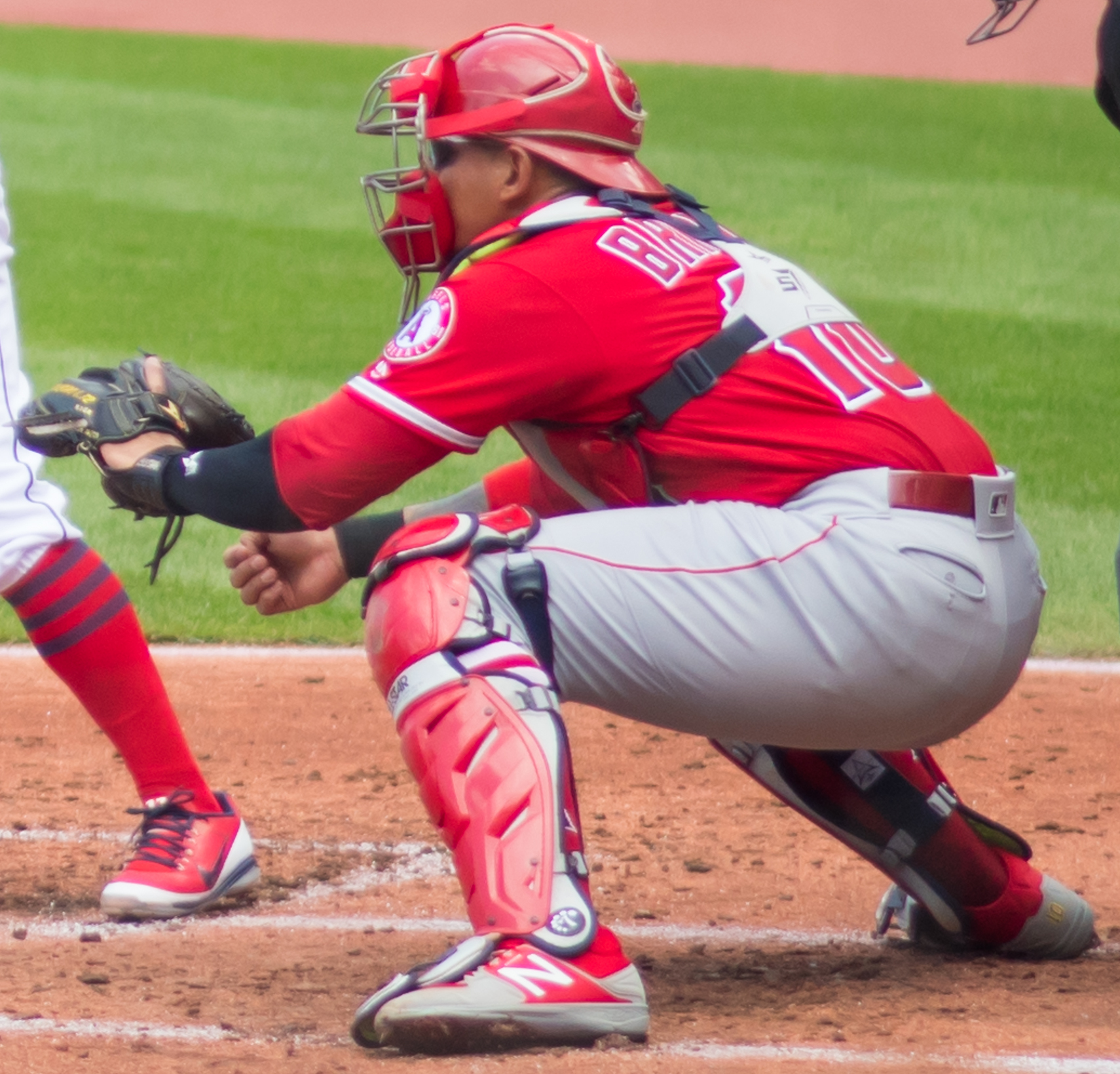
Briceño with the Angels in 2018

He hit a home run in his first Major League game on May 26, 2018. For the season, in the major leagues he batted 239/.299/.385 with five home runs and 10 RBIs in at 117 bats.

On August 8, 2019, Briceño was released by the Angels organization. Briceño re-signed with the Angels on a minor league contract on September 1. He was invited to Spring Training for the 2020 season as a non–roster invite. On August 31, 2020, Briceño was selected to the 40-man and active rosters. In 2 games for Los Angeles, he went 1–for–5 with a walk. On October 30, Briceño was outrighted off of the 40-man roster. He became a free agent on November 2.

=== Colorado Rockies (second stint) ===
On November 13, 2020, Briceño signed a minor league contract with the Colorado Rockies organization. Briceño was assigned to the Triple-A Albuquerque Isotopes to begin the 2021 season. After hitting .212/.257/.434 with 5 home runs and 15 RBI in 31 games for Albuquerque, Briceño was released by the Rockies on July 21, 2021.

=== Lexington Legends ===
On August 20, 2021, Briceño signed with the Lexington Legends of the Atlantic League of Professional Baseball. He became a free agent following the season. In 38 games he hit .333/.396/.680 with 13 home runs and 36 RBIs.

On March 5, 2022, Briceño re-signed with the Legends for the 2022 season. In 26 games he hit .237/.327/.402 with 3 home runs, 19 RBIs and 3 stolen bases.

=== Kansas City Royals ===
On May 24, 2022, Briceño's contract was purchased by the Kansas City Royals organization. Briceño played in 41 games for the Triple-A Omaha Storm Chasers, batting .252/.298/.405 with 4 home runs and 21 RBI. He elected free agency on November 10.

On January 25, 2023, Briceño re-signed with the Royals organization on a minor league contract. He split the year between Omaha and the Double–A Northwest Arkansas Naturals, playing in 49 total games and hitting .226/.275/.401 with 9 home runs and 24 RBI. Briceño elected free agency following the season on November 6.

=== Diablos Rojos del México ===
On February 20, 2024, Briceño signed with the Diablos Rojos del México of the Mexican League. In 46 games, he batted .203/.256/.257 with one home run and 12 RBI. On July 5, Briceño was released by the Diablos.
