= Erick Aybar =

Dominican baseball player (born 1984)

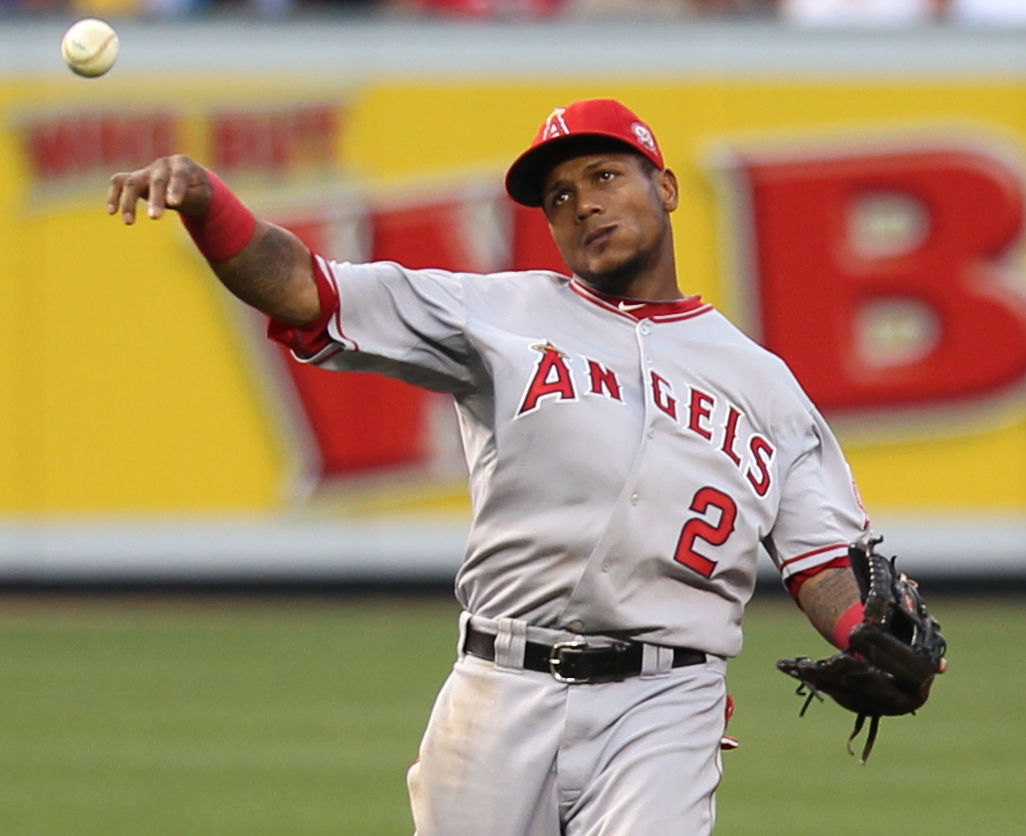
- Aybar with the Angels in 2011
- Shortstop
- Born: January 14, 1984 (age 42); Baní, Dominican Republic
- Batted: Switch Threw: Right

MLB debut
- May 16, 2006, for the Los Angeles Angels of Anaheim

Last MLB appearance
- October 1, 2017, for the San Diego Padres

MLB statistics
- Batting average: .271
- Home runs: 58
- Runs batted in: 473
- Stats at Baseball Reference

Teams
- Los Angeles Angels of Anaheim (2006–2015); Atlanta Braves (2016); Detroit Tigers (2016); San Diego Padres (2017)

Career highlights and awards
- All-Star (2014); Gold Glove Award (2011)
Medals
Men's baseball
Representing Dominican Republic
World Baseball Classic
Gold medal – first place	2013 San Francisco	Team

Erick Johan Aybar (born January 14, 1984) is a Dominican former professional baseball shortstop. He played in Major League Baseball (MLB) for the Los Angeles Angels of Anaheim, Atlanta Braves, Detroit Tigers, and San Diego Padres.

== Professional career ==
=== Los Angeles Angels of Anaheim ===
Aybar was signed by the then Anaheim Angels as an amateur free agent in 2002. He made his professional debut with the rookie ball Provo Angels. He spent the 2003 season with the Single-A Cedar Rapids Kernels, slashing .308/.346/.446 with 6 home runs and 57 RBI. In 2004, Aybar played for the High-A Rancho Cucamonga Quakes, batting .330/.370/.485 in 136 games with career-highs in home runs (14) and RBI (65). In 2005 he played for the Double-A Arkansas Travelers, hitting .303/.350/.445 with 9 home runs and 45 RBI. He began the 2006 season in Triple-A with the Salt Lake Bees.

Aybar made his MLB debut on May 16, 2006, a pinch runner against the Toronto Blue Jays. He recorded his first major League hit, in his first start, on May 20, 2006, against the Los Angeles Dodgers, a single to right field in the fourth inning off of Brett Tomko. Aybar played in 34 major league games in 2006, notching 10 hits in 40 at-bats.

Aybar hit his first career major league home run on September 25, 2007, in a game against the Texas Rangers. On the year, Aybar slashed .237/.279/.289 with 1 homer and 19 RBI. Aybar played in 98 games in 2008, with a batting line .277/.314/.384 with 3 home runs and 39 RBI. On September 5, 2009, Aybar tied a franchise record for most triples in a game with two against the Kansas City Royals. On September 8, 2009, Aybar had his first career walk-off hit, against the Seattle Mariners. In 2009, Aybar hit .312 (eighth in the AL) and posted the fourth-best OPS (.776) of all AL shortstops.

Aybar played in 138 games in 2010, batting .253/.306/.330 with 5 home runs and 29 RBI. The next year, he batted .279/.322/.421 with career-highs in home runs (10) and RBI (59) in 143 contests. After the season on November 1, 2011, Aybar was awarded his first Rawlings Gold Glove Award.

In 141 games in 2012, Aybar batted .290/.324/.416 with 8 home runs and 45 RBI. In 2013, Aybar appeared in 138 contests, with a batting line of .271/.301/.382. On July 10, 2014, Aybar was named an All Star for the first time in his career, replacing injured Kansas City Royals outfielder Alex Gordon. Aybar was hitting .283 with six home runs and 45 RBIs through 89 games at the time of his selection. He finished the season hitting .278 with seven home runs and 68 RBI in a career-high 156 games played. In 2015, Aybar slashed .270/.301/.338 in 156 games, along with 3 home runs and 44 RBI.

=== Atlanta Braves ===
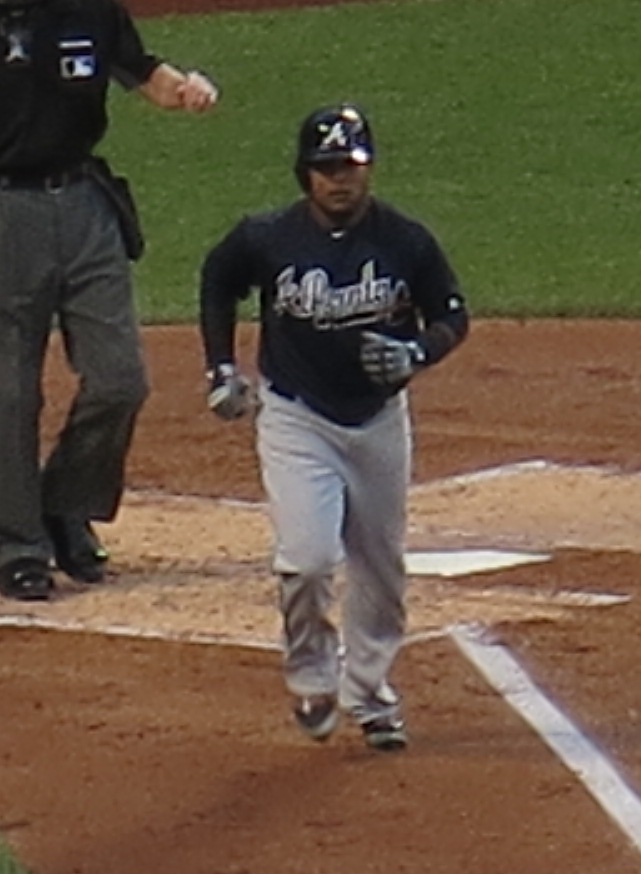
Aybar with the Atlanta Braves in 2016

On November 12, 2015, the Angels traded Aybar, Sean Newcomb, Chris Ellis and cash to the Atlanta Braves for Andrelton Simmons and José Briceño . In 97 games for Atlanta, Aybar hit 2 home runs and 26 RBI with a batting line of .242/.293/.313.

=== Detroit Tigers ===
On August 16, 2016, the Braves traded Aybar to the Detroit Tigers in exchange for Mike Avilés and Kade Scivique. At the time of the trade, Aybar was batting an average of .242 with two home runs and twenty-six RBI. Aybar mustered 20 hits in 80 at-bats in 29 games for Detroit. On November 3, 2016, Aybar elected free agency.

=== San Diego Padres ===
On February 17, 2017, Aybar signed a minor league contract with the San Diego Padres organization, receiving a non-roster invitation to spring training. Aybar made the Opening Day roster for the Padres in 2018, and was selected to the 40-man roster on March 28. On April 18, Aybar made a pitching appearance for the Padres in a blowout loss against the Arizona Diamondbacks, and got catcher Chris Herrmann to hit into the final out of the game. On July 24, Aybar suffered a fractured foot and missed a month and a half as a result. With the Padres in 2017 he batted .234/.300/.348 with 7 home runs and 22 RBI in 108 games.

=== Acereros de Monclova ===
On February 24, 2018, Aybar signed a minor league contract with the Minnesota Twins organization. He opted out of his contract and became a free agent on March 23.

On July 13, 2018, Aybar signed with the Acereros de Monclova of the Mexican League. In 43 games for Monclova, Aybar slashed .291/.354/.401. The next year, he batted .319/.412/.496 in 88 contests for Monclova. Aybar did not play in a game in 2020 due to the cancellation of the Mexican League season because of the COVID-19 pandemic.

In 2021, Aybar slashed .318/.384/.450 with three home runs and 29 RBI in 52 games. He was released by the team following the season on January 10, 2022.

=== Algodoneros de Unión Laguna ===
On February 9, 2022, Aybar signed with the Algodoneros de Unión Laguna of the Mexican League. In 42 games, he batted .261/.324/.379 with 4 home runs and 17 RBI. Aybar was released by the Algodoneros on June 21.

== Personal life ==
Aybar is the youngest brother (by 10 months) of former Tampa Bay Rays infielder/outfielder Willy Aybar. His nephew, Wander Franco, also played for the Rays.
