= Andrelton Simmons =

Curaçaoan baseball player (born 1989)

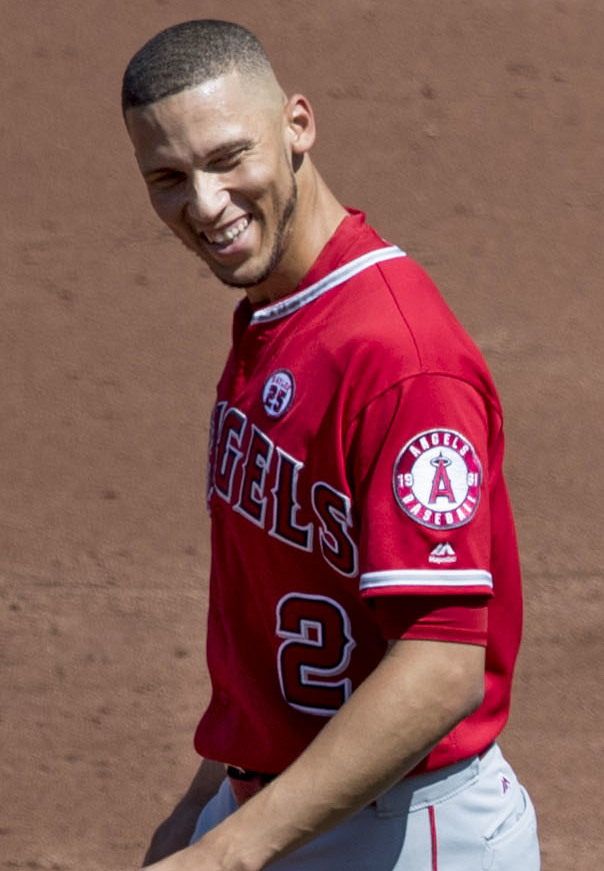
- Simmons with the Los Angeles Angels in 2017

Dorados de Chihuahua – No. 19
- Shortstop
- Born: September 4, 1989 (age 37); Willemstad, Curaçao
- Batted: Right Threw: Right

MLB debut
- June 2, 2012, for the Atlanta Braves

Last MLB appearance
- July 10, 2022, for the Chicago Cubs

MLB statistics (through 2022 season)
- Batting average: .263
- Home runs: 70
- Runs batted in: 444
- Stats at Baseball Reference

Teams
- Atlanta Braves (2012–2015); Los Angeles Angels (2016–2020); Minnesota Twins (2021); Chicago Cubs (2022)

Career highlights and awards
- 4× Gold Glove Award (2013, 2014, 2017, 2018)
Medals
Men's baseball
Representing Curaçao
Caribbean Cup
Silver medal – second place	2023 Puerto Rico	Team

Andrelton Alexander Simmons (born September 4, 1989) is a Curaçaoan professional baseball shortstop for the Dorados de Chihuahua of the Mexican League. He has previously played in Major League Baseball (MLB) for the Atlanta Braves, Los Angeles Angels, Minnesota Twins, and Chicago Cubs.

Drawing considerable attention for his defensive abilities, Simmons won four Rawlings Gold Glove Awards at shortstop, a Wilson MLB Overall Defensive Player of the Year Award, and six Fielding Bible Awards. As of the end of 2019 season, he ranked first in DRS and UZR against all shortstops who played in the stats' respective eras (2003–present for DRS, 2002-present for UZR).

== Amateur career ==
Simmons played youth baseball alongside fellow Curaçao natives Kenley Jansen and Didi Gregorius; he also played basketball and soccer.

Due to his slight build, Simmons did not draw much attention from MLB scouts until he attended Western Oklahoma State College in Altus, Oklahoma. As a freshman at Western Oklahoma State, Simmons hit .472 with seven home runs and 40 runs batted in (RBIs), leading his team to the 2010 National Junior College Athletic Association Division II College World Series.

== Professional career ==
=== Atlanta Braves ===
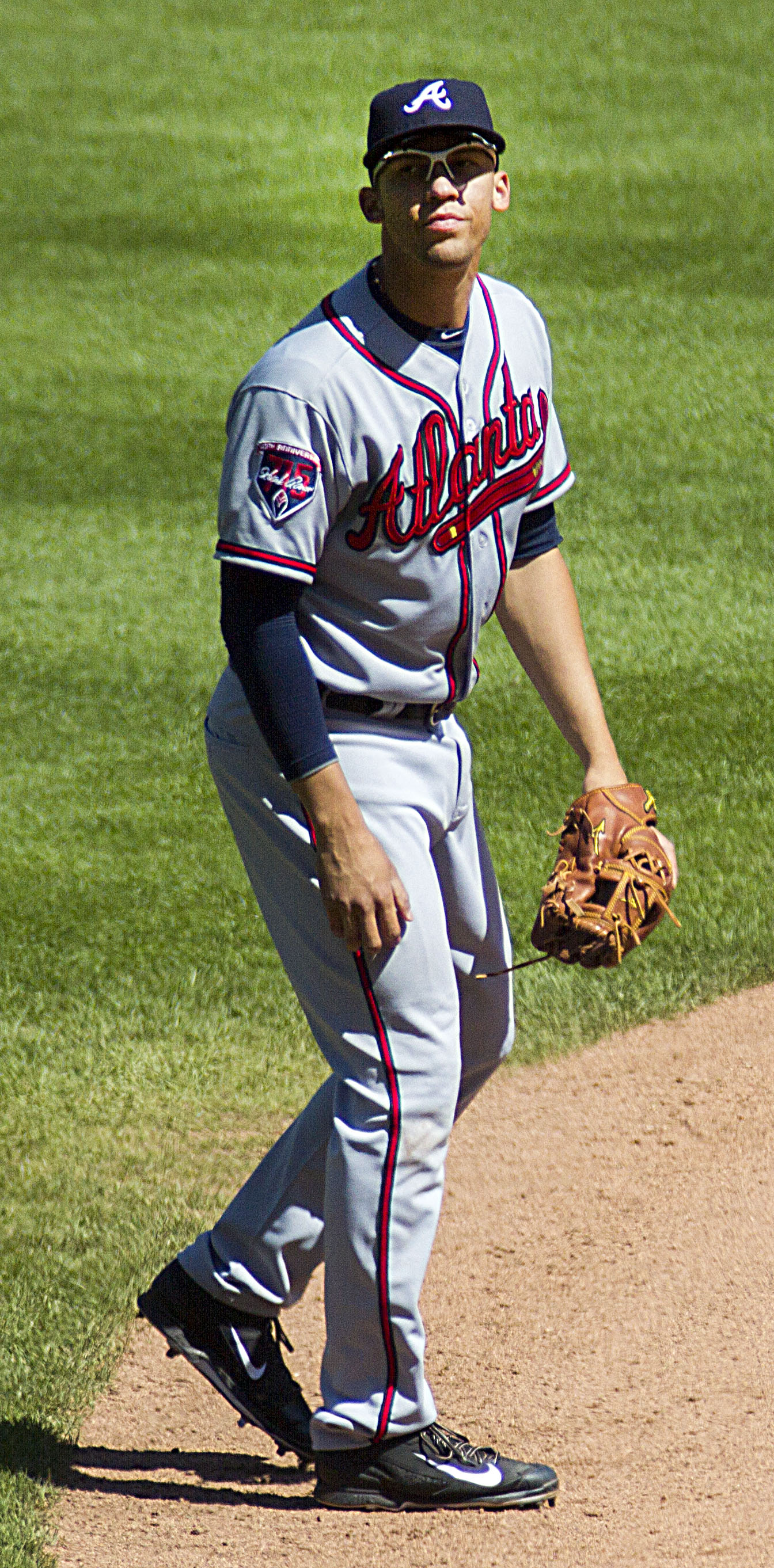
Simmons with the Braves in 2014

Simmons was drafted by the Atlanta Braves in the second round of the 2010 Major League Baseball draft out of Western Oklahoma State College.

Prior to the 2012 season, Simmons was the Braves' fourth-best prospect according to Baseball America. He was ranked 92nd in all of baseball. During spring training he competed with Tyler Pastornicky for the Braves starting shortstop job. On May 30, 2012, the Braves called Simmons up, and he made his Major League debut on June 2 against the Washington Nationals. He got his first Major League hit, a double, on June 3. Simmons was named National League Rookie of the Month for June 2012 after hitting .333 with six doubles, three home runs, and 14 RBIs in June. He led all NL rookies in batting average and on-base percentage. He also won praise for his outstanding defense. On July 8, 2012, during a game against the Philadelphia Phillies, Simmons suffered a non-displaced fracture of the fifth metacarpal on his right hand while sliding head-first into second base. On July 9, he was placed on the 15-day disabled list.

In the 2012 National League Wild Card Game against the St. Louis Cardinals, Simmons hit an eighth-inning fly ball to left field that dropped in between Cardinals shortstop Pete Kozma and left fielder Matt Holliday. Simmons was believed by many to have been entitled to a single, but left field umpire Sam Holbrook cited the infield fly rule (Note: The infield fly rule states, in part, that the batter is out when, with first and second base occupied with fewer than two out, the batter hits a fair fly ball which is not a line drive nor bunt, and this fly ball can be caught by an infielder with ordinary effort. This was controversial in part because the ball landed 225 feet (69 m) from home plate, in the outfield grass, and was by far the deepest uncaught pop-up called infield fly since 2009, and as a result was so far from the bases that intentionally letting it drop could not have led to an unfair double play (the intention of the rule is to prevent such a play) as evidenced by the fact that both baserunners advanced easily.) and called Simmons out. Angered Braves fans littered the field with trash, causing a 19-minute delay and a threatened forfeit. The Braves lost the game 6–3 and were eliminated.

Simmons had his first full season in 2013, playing in 157 games. He finished the 2013 season with the highest Defensive Runs Saved ever recorded in a year and received the Gold Glove, the Fielding Bible Award, and the Rawlings Platinum Glove Award for his defensive work that season.

On February 20, 2014, the Atlanta Braves signed Simmons to a seven-year deal worth $58 million. In 2014 he batted .244/.286/.331. At the end of the year, Simmons won the Gold Glove and Fielding Bible awards for his position.

In 2015 he batted .265/.321/.338. He had the lowest number of pitches per plate appearance in the major leagues (3.27).

=== Los Angeles Angels ===
On November 12, 2015, Simmons, along with catcher José Briceño, was traded to the Los Angeles Angels of Anaheim for Erick Aybar, Sean Newcomb and Chris Ellis. In a May 9, 2016, game against the Tampa Bay Rays, Simmons tore the ulnar collateral ligament of his left thumb and was placed on the disabled list. He was reactivated on June 16. For the season, he batted .281/.324/.366, and struck out in only 7.9% of his at bats. He received the Fielding Bible Award for the fourth straight year.

In 2017, Simmons hit .278/.331/.421 with 14 home runs and 69 RBIs, and had the lowest strikeout percentage of all major league baseball players (10.4%). Simmons finished 8th in the American League Most Valuable Player voting. He received his third Gold Glove Award as well in 2017. His Defensive Wins Above Replacement in 2017 was 5.0, third-highest of all time and highest since 1917.

In 2018, he batted .292/.337/.417 with 11 home runs and a career-high 75 RBIs, a major-league-leading 28 infield hits, had the lowest strikeout percentage of all major league baseball players (7.3%) for the second consecutive year, had the lowest number of pitches per plate appearance in the major leagues (3.30), and led the majors in pull percentage (51.0%). He also won a Gold Glove for the second consecutive season. As of 2018, he led the major leagues in career at bats per strikeout (10.32). He was placed on the disabled list on May 21, 2019, with an ankle injury.

On September 22, 2020, Simmons announced he was opting out of the remainder of the 2020 season. At the time of his opt-out, Simmons had slashed .297/.346/.356 with no home runs and 10 RBI. While he initially attributed the opt-out to concerns relating to the COVID-19 pandemic, Simmons later revealed in February 2021 that he opted-out due to depression and suicidal ideations.

=== Minnesota Twins ===
On January 31, 2021, Simmons signed a one-year, $10.5 million contract with the Minnesota Twins. Simmons finished the 2021 season with a .223 batting average, 3 home runs, 31 RBI, 1 stolen base, and a 57 OPS+, the lowest of his career.

=== Chicago Cubs ===
On March 15, 2022, Simmons signed a one-year, $4 million contract with the Chicago Cubs. In 34 games for Chicago, he batted .173/.244/.187 with no home runs, 7 RBI, and 4 stolen bases. Simmons was designated for assignment on August 6, and elected free agency the following day.

=== Mumbai Cobras ===
On October 23, 2023, Simmons was drafted in the first round by the Mumbai Cobras, with the 8th overall selection, of the Baseball United inaugural draft.

On December 26, 2023, Simmons announced his retirement from professional baseball.

Despite his retirement, on January 13, 2024, Simmons was announced as part of the Curaçao Suns roster that would represent Curaçao in the 2024 Caribbean Series in Miami.

=== Dorados de Chihuahua ===
On January 12, 2025, Simmons came out of retirement and signed with the Dorados de Chihuahua of the Mexican League. In 87 appearances for the Dorados, he hit .324/.367/.444 with four home runs, 54 RBI, and 10 stolen bases.

== International career ==
=== World Baseball Classic ===
Simmons represented the Netherlands national team at the 2013 World Baseball Classic, 2017 World Baseball Classic., and 2023 World Baseball Classic.
