= Gus Schlosser =

American baseball player (born 1988)

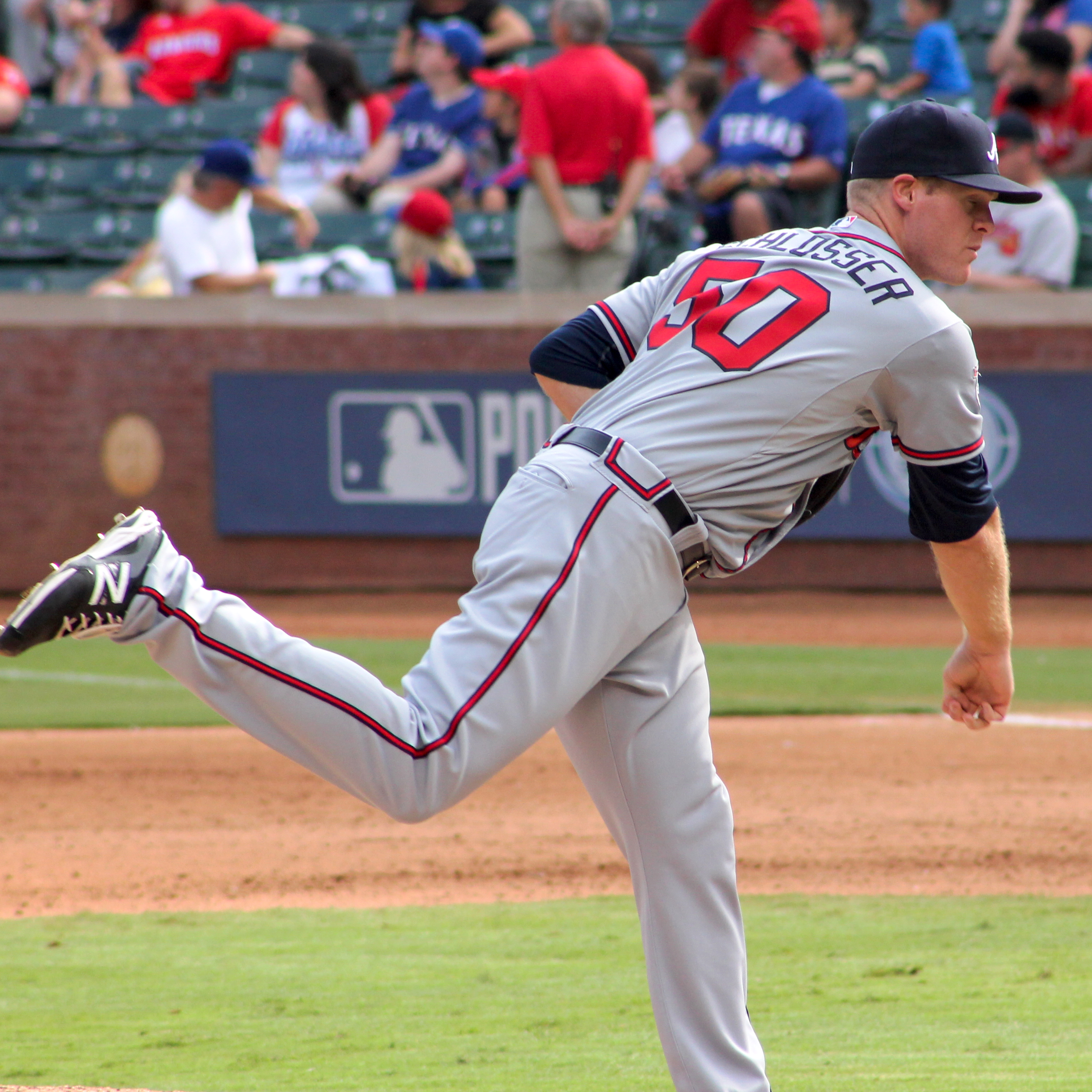
- Schlosser with the Atlanta Braves
- Pitcher
- Born: October 20, 1988 (age 37); Sarasota, Florida
- Batted: Right Threw: Right

MLB debut
- March 31, 2014, for the Atlanta Braves

Last appearance
- September 25, 2014, for the Atlanta Braves

MLB statistics
- Win–loss record: 0–1
- Earned run average: 7.64
- Strikeouts: 8
- Stats at Baseball Reference

Teams
- Atlanta Braves (2014)

August Carl Schlosser (born October 20, 1988) is an American former professional baseball pitcher. He played in Major League Baseball (MLB) for the Atlanta Braves.

== Professional career ==
=== Atlanta Braves ===
Schlosser played Little League Baseball and four years of high school baseball for the Lakewood Ranch Mustangs. He continued his baseball career at Manatee Community College and was drafted by the Atlanta Braves in the 17th round of the 2011 Major League Baseball draft out of Florida Southern College. While pitching in the minor leagues, Schlosser was primarily a starter. In 2013, he pitched for the Double—A Mississippi Braves and finished with a 2.39 earned run average.

Invited to spring training by the Braves in 2014, Schlosser competed for a bullpen spot on the Braves opening day roster. On March 29, it was announced that he had made the team. He made his major league debut against the Milwaukee Brewers on March 31, inducing a double play and throwing a strikeout. Schlosser was optioned to the Gwinnett Braves in early May, as Mike Minor was reinstated from the disabled list. He returned to Atlanta in late June for a single appearance, was recalled from and returned to the minors again in July as Anthony Varvaro was placed on the paternity list, then returned to the major leagues in September. With Atlanta in 2014, Schlosser threw 17 2/3 innings in 15 appearances, striking out eight and walking six. He pitched to a 7.64 earned run average and a 0–1 win–loss record.

Schlosser became a free agent on December 2, 2014 after he was non-tendered by the Braves. The Braves then signed Schlosser to a minor league contract.

=== Colorado Rockies ===
On January 30, 2015, the Braves traded Schlosser and David Hale to the Colorado Rockies in exchange for minor league catchers José Briceño and Chris O'Dowd. Schlosser was released by the Rockies on July 31.

=== Somerset Patriots ===
He signed with the Somerset Patriots of the Atlantic League of Professional Baseball on August 9, 2015. In 19 innings pitched over 17 games, he went 1–0 with a 3.79 ERA with 16 strikeouts and 1 save.

In 2016, Schlosser returned to the Patriots for a second season. In 15 games and 15 innings pitched, he went 2–0 with a 1.20 ERA with 19 strikeouts and 1 save.

=== Los Angeles Dodgers ===
On May 31, 2016, the Los Angeles Dodgers signed Schlosser to a minor league contract. He appeared in 14 games for the Double–A Tulsa Drillers and 12 games for the Triple–A Oklahoma City Dodgers with a combined 5.48 ERA. Schlosser elected free agency following the season on November 7.

== Personal life ==
Schlosser is married to Caitlin.
