= Ervin Santana =

Dominican baseball player (born 1982)

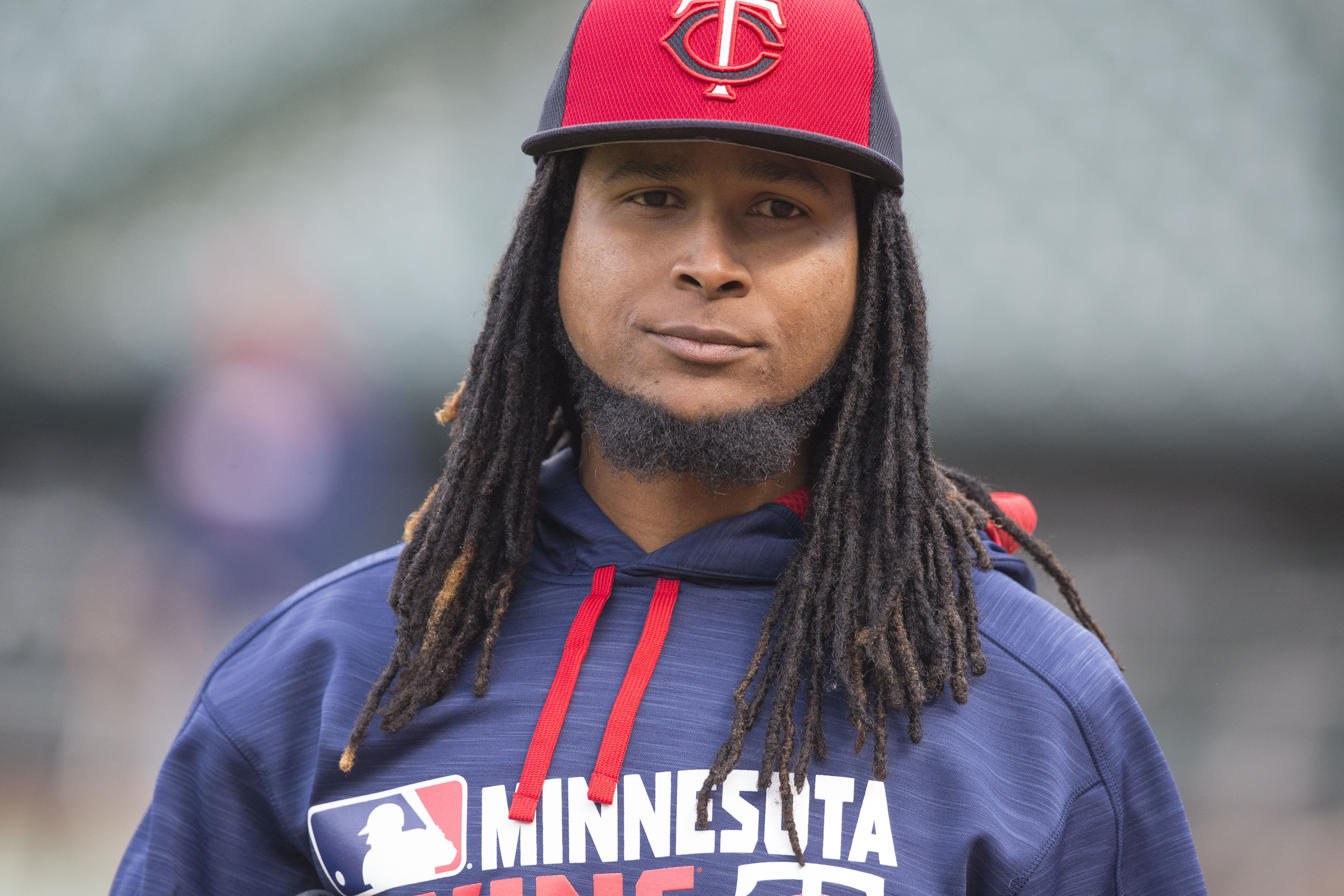
- Santana with the Minnesota Twins in 2016
- Pitcher
- Born: December 12, 1982 (age 43); San Cristobal, Dominican Republic
- Batted: Right Threw: Right

MLB debut
- May 17, 2005, for the Los Angeles Angels of Anaheim

Last MLB appearance
- October 1, 2021, for the Kansas City Royals

MLB statistics
- Win–loss record: 151–129
- Earned run average: 4.11
- Strikeouts: 1,978
- Stats at Baseball Reference

Teams
- Los Angeles Angels of Anaheim (2005–2012); Kansas City Royals (2013); Atlanta Braves (2014); Minnesota Twins (2015–2018); Chicago White Sox (2019); Kansas City Royals (2021)

Career highlights and awards
- 2× All-Star (2008, 2017); Pitched a no-hitter on July 27, 2011

Ervin Ramon Santana (born Johan Ramon Santana; December 12, 1982) is a Dominican former professional baseball pitcher. He played in Major League Baseball for the Los Angeles Angels of Anaheim, Kansas City Royals (twice), Atlanta Braves, Minnesota Twins, and Chicago White Sox. Santana is a two-time All-Star, and he threw a no-hitter with the Angels in 2011.

Santana was born Johan Ramon Santana, and used that name until 2003. He changed his name to avoid having the same name as Venezuelan pitching star Johan Santana. According to Santana, "I just came up with Ervin... Ervin Santana, that sounds good."

== Playing career ==
=== Los Angeles Angels of Anaheim ===
Santana signed with the Anaheim Angels as an amateur free agent on September 2, 2000. He was a starting pitcher for the Angels' Double-A affiliate, the Arkansas Travelers early in 2005, where he posted a 5–1 record and 2.31 ERA in 7 starts. Following an injury to Angels starting pitcher Kelvim Escobar, Santana earned a promotion. He made his first major league appearance on May 17, 2005, against the Cleveland Indians, in which he gave up the pitching version of the cycle in first four batters that he faced. In his second start, facing the Chicago White Sox's Jon Garland, (who at the time had the best record in baseball), Santana bested Garland by pitching a complete game shutout. He gave up only 5 hits and struck out 7 for his first career victory. Santana then went on the disabled list and was sent back down to the minors to the Angels' Triple-A affiliate, the Salt Lake Bees.

After Escobar's elbow problems became a recurring problem, he was placed back on the DL and Santana received his second call-up to the majors. He pitched well enough to earn a spot on the playoff roster, but was initially left out of the four-man rotation. In the pivotal Game 5 of the American League Division Series of the playoffs against the New York Yankees, Angels ace Bartolo Colón went out with a shoulder injury in the second inning. Santana filled in as the long reliever, and pitched 5 1/3 innings to earn his first playoff win in his first appearance.

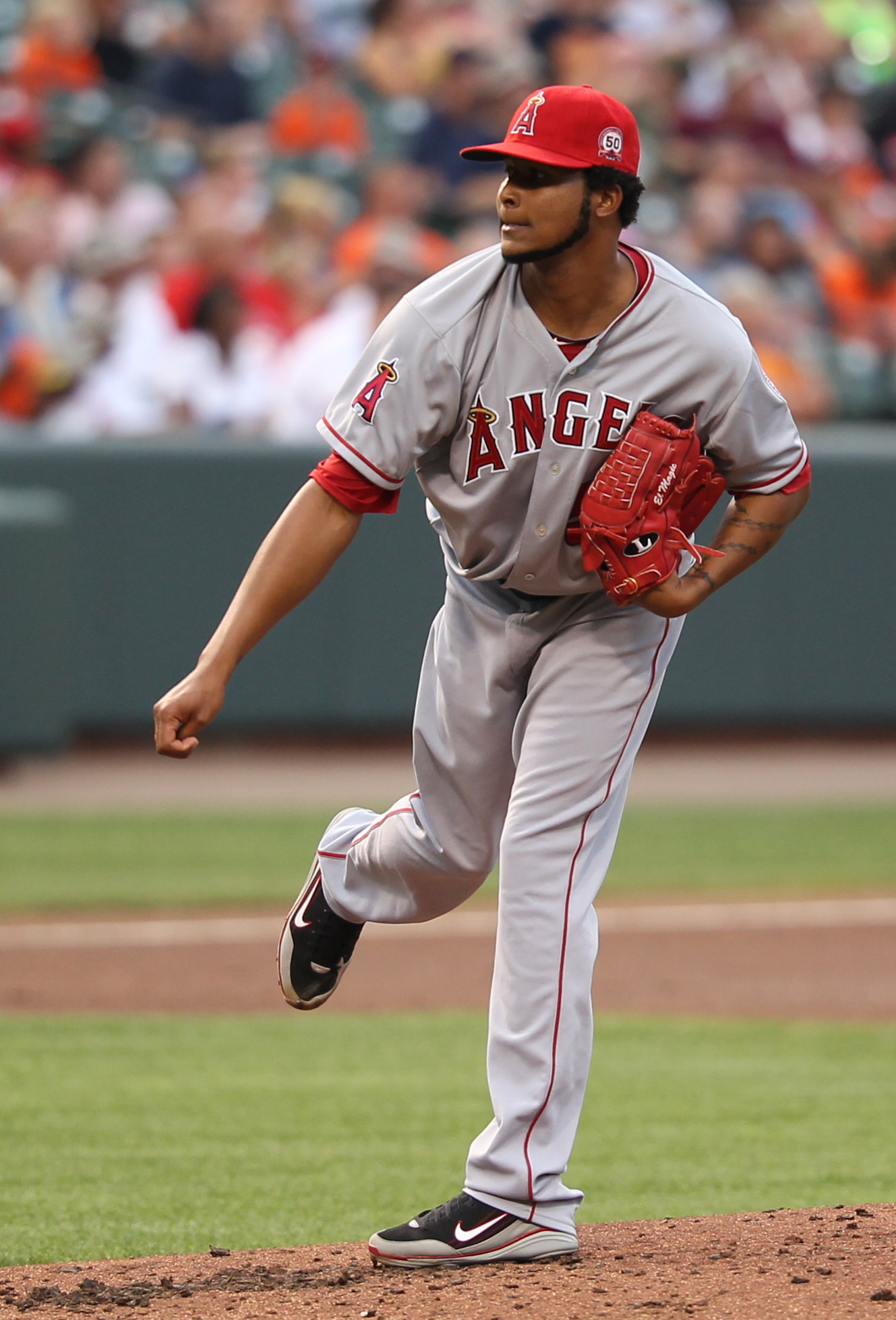
Santana pitching for the Los Angeles Angels in 2011

His short rookie season with the Angels ended with 12 wins in the regular season. In the 2006 season, he finished with a 16–8 record. After a disappointing start to the 2007 season where he went 5–11 with a 6.22 ERA, he was optioned to Triple-A Salt Lake Bees on July 18, 2007. He was recalled by the Angels on August 17, and regained his spot in the starting rotation.

On April 30, 2008, Santana equaled an Angels record with a 5–0 start to the season. He joined Angels legend Frank Tanana and teammate Joe Saunders, who equaled Tanana the day before. Santana was 11–3 with a 3.34 ERA at the All-Star Break. Pitching in the 2008 MLB All-Star Game, Santana gave up a fifth inning homer to Matt Holliday of the Colorado Rockies.

On September 22, 2008, Santana pitched against the Seattle Mariners, going 8 innings, allowing 5 hits, 1 earned run, and striking out 9 en route to his career-high tying 16th win of the season. He finished the season with a career-high 214 strikeouts, good for second in the American League behind A. J. Burnett, while pitching to a 3.49 ERA in 219 innings across 32 starts. On October 3, he gave up 4 runs in the first inning and 5 total in 5 1/3 innings against the Boston Red Sox in Game 2 of the ALDS. He finished tied for sixth in the voting for the American League Cy Young Award with Mike Mussina.

Santana started out the 2009 season on the disabled list. In his first game of the season, he received a no-decision against the Boston Red Sox. After struggling with a disappointing 8.35 ERA, the Angels placed him on the disabled list.

On September 28, 2009, Santana pitched a complete-game shutout, becoming the first pitcher in franchise history to pitch a shutout in a game to clinch the Western Division. In 2010, despite the Angels finishing two games under .500, he finished the season with a 17–10 record and a 3.92 ERA with 169 strikeouts in 222 2/3 innings, tying a career high with 4 complete games.

On July 27, 2011, Ervin Santana pitched a no-hitter against the Cleveland Indians. It was Santana's first career no-hitter, and the Angels first no-hitter since 1990. It was also Ervin Santana's first victory against the Cleveland Indians in 11 career starts. He struck out 10, walked 1, and allowed 1 unearned run. At the end of the 2011 season, Santana pitched a career-best 3.38 ERA and an 11–12 record in 228 2/3 innings.

In 2012, Santana struggled throughout the season, posting an ERA of 5.16 in 30 starts. Despite posting an ERA over 5, Santana's WHIP stood reasonably low, registering at 1.27 with 165 hits allowed in 178 innings. He surrendered a career high 39 home runs, which led the majors for the 2012 season.

=== Kansas City Royals ===
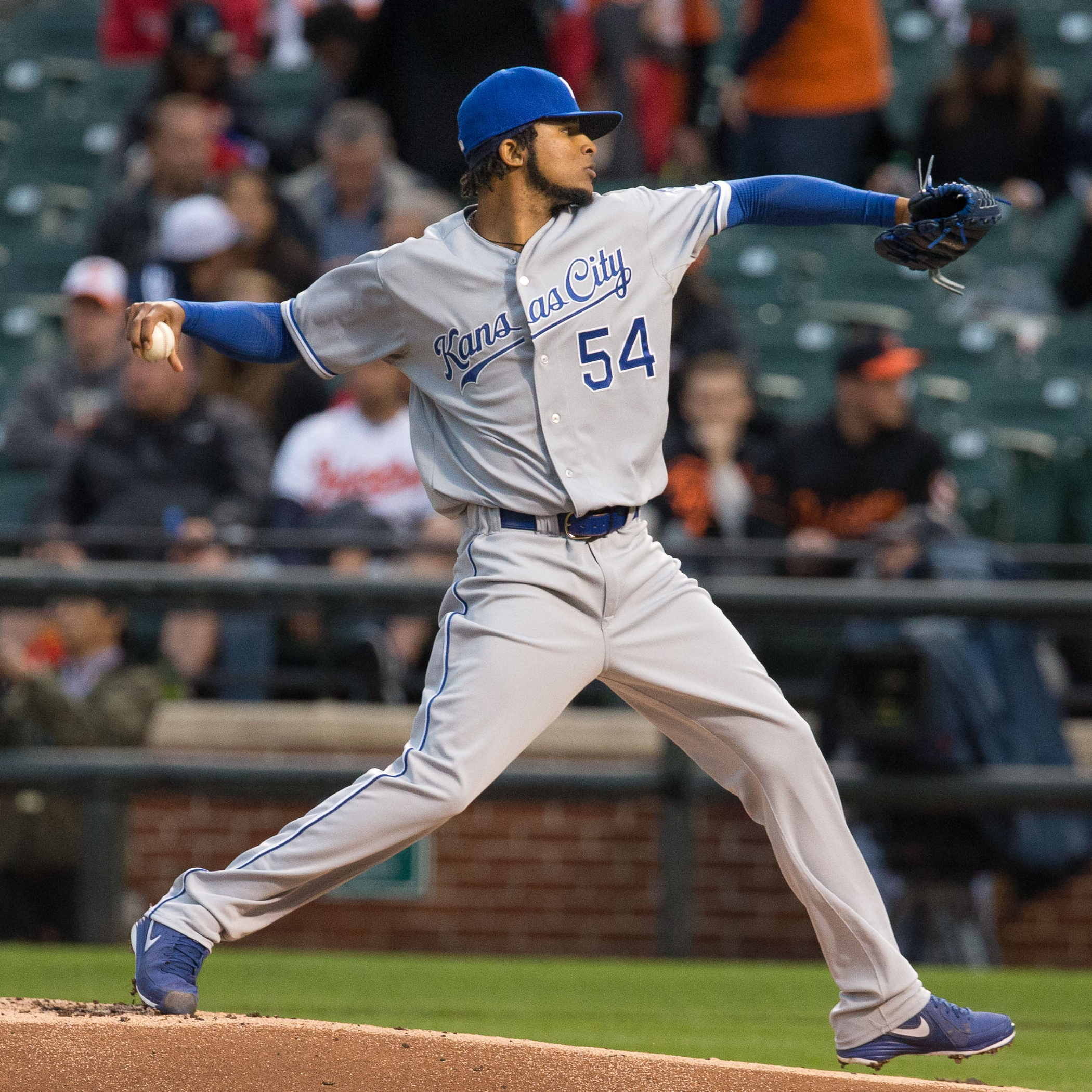
Santana pitching for the Kansas City Royals in 2013

On October 31, 2012, Santana was traded to the Kansas City Royals in exchange for left-handed minor league reliever Brandon Sisk. The Angels picked up the $13 million option on Santana prior to making the trade, and agreed to cover an undisclosed portion of that amount for the Royals. Santana earned his 100th career win on June 8, 2013, against the Houston Astros. In 32 starts with the Royals, he was 9–10 with a 3.24 ERA (a career-best) with 161 strikeouts in 211 innings. The Royals made a $14.1 million qualifying offer to him after the season, but he turned it down and became a free agent.

=== Atlanta Braves ===
Because of Santana's rejection of the Royals' offer, any team that signed him for 2014 would have to surrender a draft pick. As a result of that and some concerns about his long term health and his reported contract demands, Santana did not sign with any teams before spring training began. As spring training continued, Santana fired his agent and changed his contract demands to a one-year deal near what his rejected qualifying offer was.

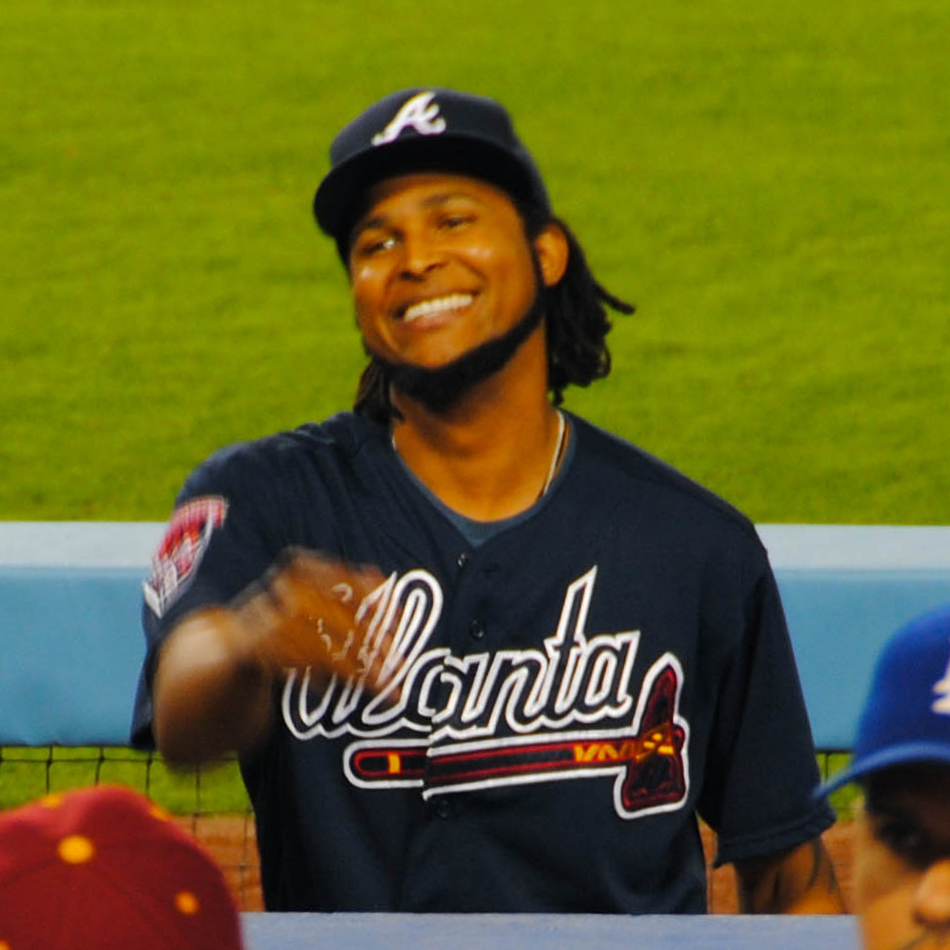
Santana with the Atlanta Braves in 2014

Santana proceeded to negotiate with the Toronto Blue Jays, and verbally agreed to a contract but stalled signing it for several days. Following an injury to Kris Medlen of the Atlanta Braves, Santana immediately agreed to terms identical to the Blue Jays' reported offer of $14.1 million for one season. Santana's first year in the NL was mixed as he posted an ERA of 3.94 with the Braves in 31 starts. He surrendered a career-low 16 home runs in 196 innings while going 14–10 and striking out 179 batters.

=== Minnesota Twins ===
On December 12, 2014, Santana signed with the Minnesota Twins on a four-year, $54 million deal with an option for a fifth year. On April 3, MLB announced that Santana would be suspended for 80 games after testing positive for Stanozolol, a performance-enhancing drug. On July 5, 2015, Santana was activated from his 80-game suspension and made his season debut against his former team, the Kansas City Royals. After finishing with a 7–5 record and a 4.00 ERA in 2015, Santana served as the ace of the Twins rotation during a disappointing 2016 season for the team. Despite a 7–11 record, largely due to poor run support, Santana finished with a strong 3.38 ERA in 181 innings pitched (30 starts).

Santana represented Team Dominican Republic at the 2017 World Baseball Classic.

On April 3, 2017, Santana was the starting pitcher on Opening Day against the Kansas City Royals. He pitched seven innings, and earned the win while only allowing one run (a solo homer) and two hits. On April 15 Santana pitched a complete game one hit shutout against the White Sox, he struck out eight and walked one batter. Santana pitched another shutout against the Baltimore Orioles on May 23, followed by a third complete-game shutout against the San Francisco Giants in which he threw just 91 pitches. Santana became the first pitcher in the American League to record three complete-game shutouts in a season since Rick Porcello in 2014, and the first to do so prior to the All-Star break since Justin Masterson in 2013. On July 2 he was named to his second All-Star team and his first since 2008. At that time Santana had a 10–5 record with a 3.07 ERA in 111 1/3 innings, while limiting opponents to a .204 batting average, second in the American League behind Chris Sale. On August 29, Santana became the 90th pitcher in history to hit 100 career batters. He finished the season 16–8 with a 3.28 ERA and 1.13 WHIP in 211 1/3 innings, notching 167 strikeouts against 61 walks, while pacing the lead in the Major Leagues with 5 complete games (3 shutouts). He also had the lowest line drive percentage allowed (16.3%) of all major league pitchers. On November 15, Santana finished seventh in the voting for the Cy Young Award, receiving three fifth place votes. It marked the first time since 2008 Santana received Cy Young votes.

On February 6, 2018, Santana underwent surgery on his middle finger, delaying his season by 10 to 12 weeks. He had discomfort in the finger since the previous season, but there was no serious damage. The surgery was a capsular release/debridement procedure to his MCP joint. Due to this and other injuries, Santana was limited to 5 starts on the season. The Twins declined his contract option and made him a free agent on October 30, 2018.

=== Chicago White Sox ===
On February 22, 2019, Santana signed a minor league deal with the Chicago White Sox, earning a $4.3 million salary for his time with the major league team. The White Sox selected his contract on April 9, and he made his White Sox debut that day. On April 26, 2019, Santana was designated for assignment. Santana elected free agency on April 29.

=== New York Mets ===
On May 24, 2019, Santana signed a minor league contract with the New York Mets organization. In 18 starts split between the Triple–A Syracuse Mets and High–A St. Lucie Mets, he accumulated a 5–5 record and 5.31 ERA with 65 strikeouts across 95 innings pitched. Santana elected free agency following the season on November 4.

=== Kansas City Royals (second stint) ===
On December 29, 2020, Santana signed a minor league contract with the Kansas City Royals organization. On April 13, 2021, Santana was selected to the active roster. In 38 appearances for Kansas City, he compiled a 2–2 record and 4.68 ERA with 52 strikeouts over 65 1/3 innings pitched. Santana became a free agent following the season.

== Coaching career ==
On August 10, 2024, Santana was announced as the pitching coach for the Dominican Republic national baseball team in the 2024 WBSC Premier12.

== Personal life ==
Santana and his wife, Amy, married in 2009. They have a son, Jonathan, and a daughter, Sofia.

== See also ==
- List of Major League Baseball players suspended for performance-enhancing drugs

Achievements
Preceded by Justin Verlander	No-hitter pitcher July 27, 2011	Succeeded by Philip Humber
