= Aaron Barrett =

American baseball player (born 1988)

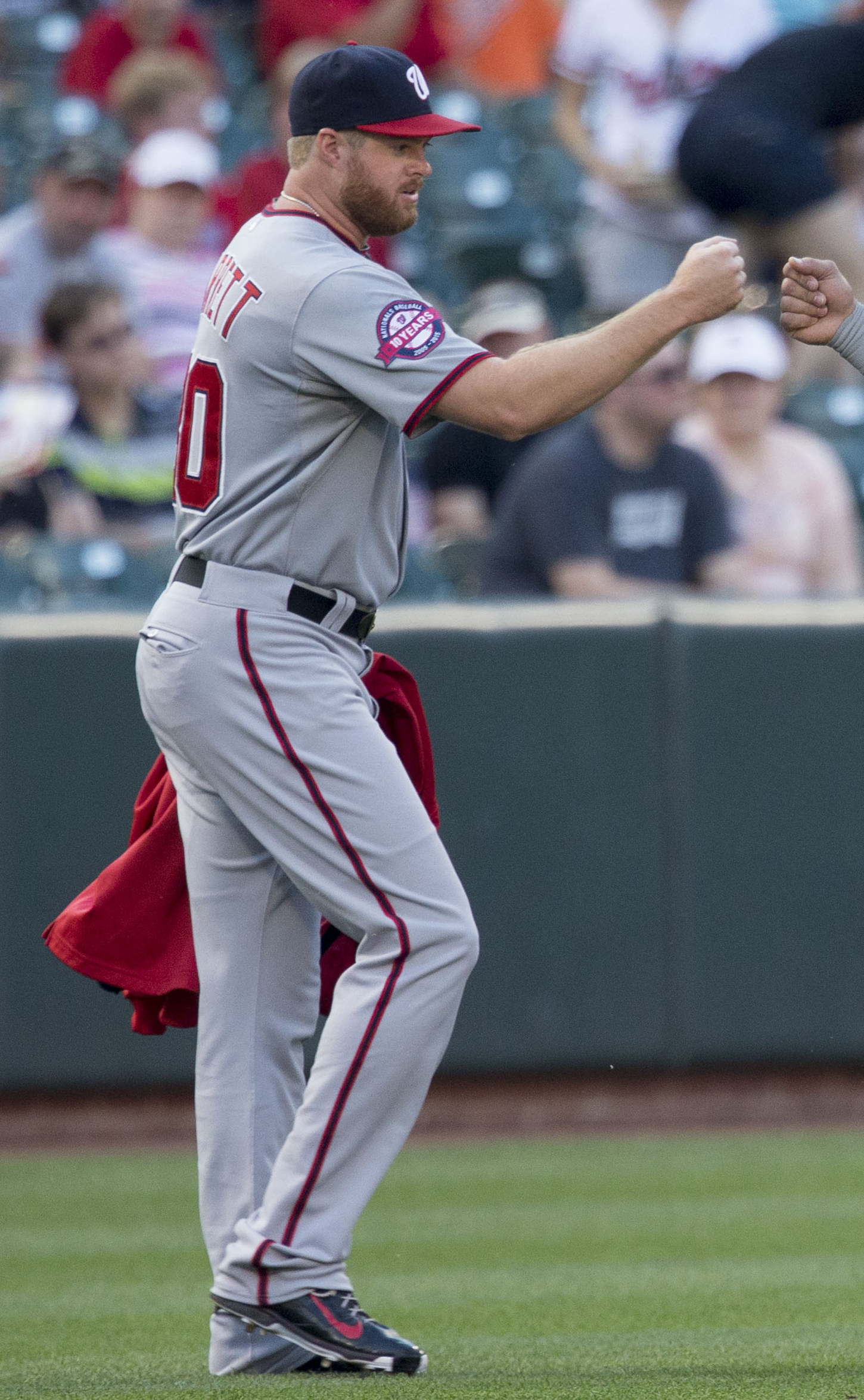
- Barrett with the Washington Nationals in 2015
- Pitcher
- Born: January 2, 1988 (age 38); Evansville, Indiana, U.S.
- Batted: Right Threw: Right

MLB debut
- March 31, 2014, for the Washington Nationals

Last MLB appearance
- September 18, 2020, for the Washington Nationals

MLB statistics
- Win–loss record: 6–3
- Earned run average: 3.98
- Strikeouts: 86
- Stats at Baseball Reference

Teams
- Washington Nationals (2014–2015, 2019–2020)

Aaron James Barrett (born January 2, 1988) is an American former professional baseball pitcher. He played in Major League Baseball (MLB) for the Washington Nationals. He made his major league debut with the Nationals in 2014, but spent four years in injury rehab and the minor leagues after Tommy John surgery in September 2015 before being called back up to the major leagues in September 2019.

== Amateur career ==
Barrett graduated from Evansville Central High School and attended Wabash Valley College for two years before transferring to the University of Mississippi (Ole Miss). He played college baseball for the Wabash Valley Warriors and the Ole Miss Rebels.

Barrett was drafted in the 2006, 2008 and 2009 Major League Baseball drafts, but did not sign a professional contract. The Los Angeles Dodgers did not offer him a contract in 2006. When he was drafted by the Minnesota Twins two years later, Barrett had already committed to Ole Miss. He did not pitch well in his first year with the Rebels, and was not going to receive a bonus from the Texas Rangers in 2009.

== Professional career ==
=== Washington Nationals ===
==== Early years with the Washington Nationals (2010–13) ====
Barrett ultimately signed with the Washington Nationals after being drafted in the ninth round of the 2010 Major League Baseball draft.

Barrett played in the Arizona Fall League in 2012. He started the 2013 season with the Class-AA Harrisburg Senators, for whom he was often called upon to close games out in the ninth inning or later. He worked closely with pitching coach Paul Menhart, who later became the Nationals' minor league pitching coordinator.

==== Major leagues (2014–15) ====
Barrett was added to the Nationals' 40-man roster for the first time after the 2013 season, and after impressing during major league spring training, he made the Nationals' Opening Day roster for the 2014 season. He made his debut in the ninth inning of the team's first game of the year against the New York Mets, striking out two while picking up his first career win. Barrett became a trusted member of manager Matt Williams' bullpen and was included on the Nationals' playoff roster in the National League Division Series. Called on to pitch in Game 4 of the series against the San Francisco Giants, the rookie threw a wild pitch over the head of catcher Wilson Ramos while intentionally walking Pablo Sandoval, allowing Joe Panik to score the winning run from third base.

Midway through the 2015 season, Barrett began experiencing discomfort in his right pitching elbow. After he gave up three earned runs in an August 5, 2015, appearance against the Arizona Diamondbacks, the Nationals optioned him to the Class-AAA Syracuse Chiefs, but they voided the option and placed him on the disabled list for an elbow strain. On September 4, 2015, Barrett underwent Tommy John surgery, in which the ulnar collateral ligament of the elbow in his left arm was transferred to his right arm. Several bone spurs were also removed from his elbow. In December, he had bone spurs in his ankle removed.

==== Rehab and return to the minor leagues (2016–18) ====
On July 23, 2016, while rehabbing at the Nationals' minor league complex in Viera, Florida, Barrett fractured the humerus bone in his right arm while pitching. Witnesses to the incident likened the sound of the bone breaking to a gunshot. Teammate Mat Latos reportedly vomited in the dugout, and Nationals manager Dusty Baker sequestered the only video of the injury on a locked hard drive so that no one could watch it. Barrett underwent surgery performed by Dr. James Andrews, which left two plates and sixteen screws embedded in the bone of his arm. Andrews later compared the fracture to the kind of traumatic injury he would expect to see from a car crash victim.

Despite the severity of the injury, Barrett continued to ramp up his baseball activity, hoping to sign a contract to pitch in 2017. After progressing enough to start throwing during the offseason, however, Barrett went in for a CT scan that showed his arm was not healing as quickly as hoped. On the advice of doctors, he shut down his throwing regimen, although he continued working out in the hopes of making an eventual return to the mound. Barrett signed a new minor league contract with the Nationals on April 3, 2017, after missing the entire 2016 season. He did not appear in a game during the 2017 season. As the contract he had signed was a two-year deal, he was invited to participate in minor league spring training as a member of the Nationals organization in 2018. He pitched against live competition for the first time since 2015 during a spring exhibition against the Canadian national baseball team and was assigned to the Short Season-A Auburn Doubledays to start the 2018 season. He made his first appearance in a professional game since 2015 on June 15, 2018, striking out three batters for a hold. He elected free agency on November 2, 2018, but soon signed a new minor league contract with the Nationals that included a non-roster invitation to major league spring training.

==== Return to the major leagues (2019–2021) ====
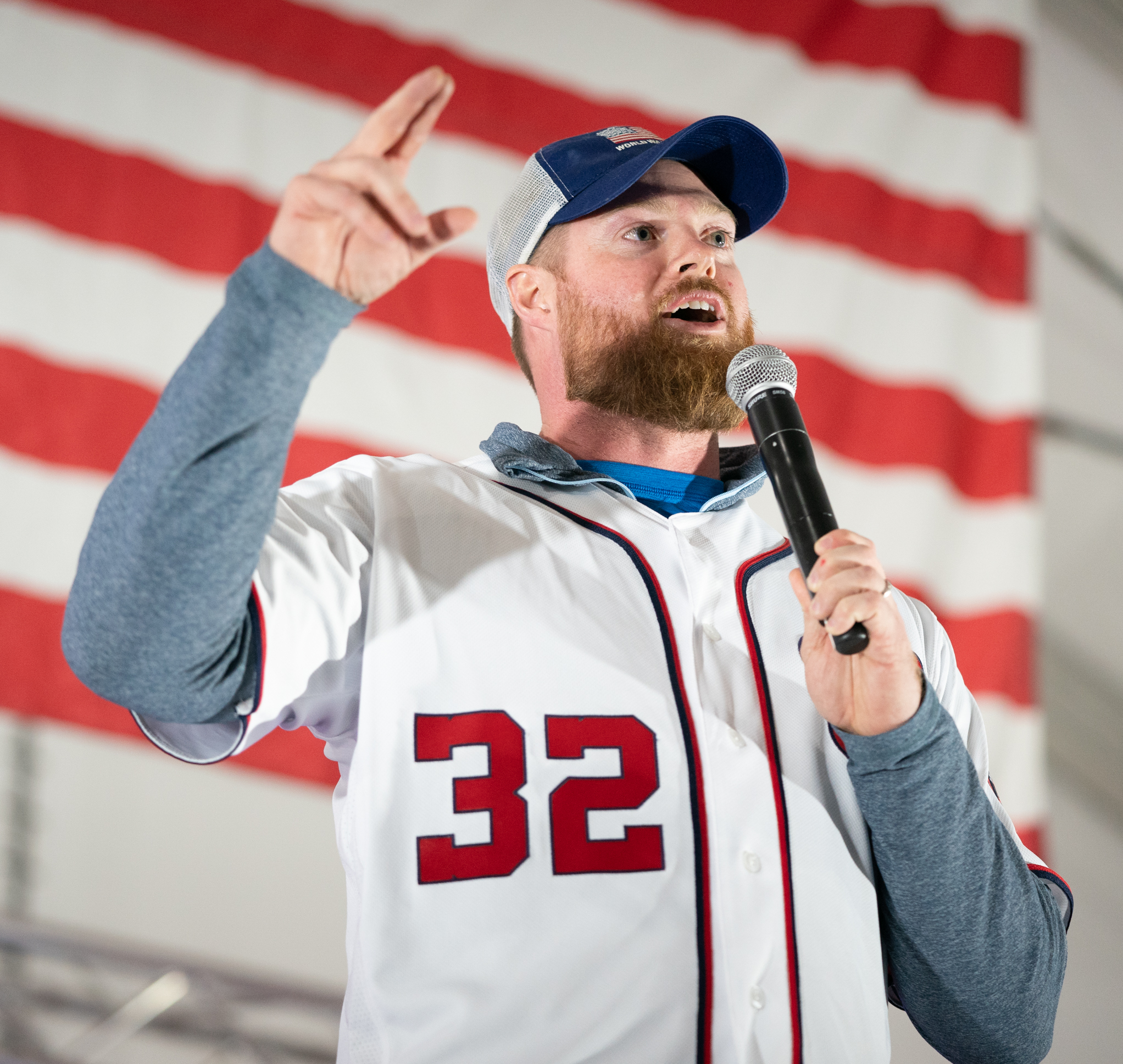
Barrett speaks in 2020

After spending part of spring training on the major league side of the Nationals camp in West Palm Beach, Florida, Barrett was assigned to Class-AA Harrisburg to start the 2019 season. As he had in 2013, before reaching the major leagues, Barrett served as the Senators' closer. On June 29, 2019, he became Harrisburg's all-time leader in games saved with 41 across multiple years, as he notched his fifteenth save of the season. As the season progressed, Barrett built up arm strength and recovered much of his former velocity, also incorporating a changeup into a pitching arsenal that had predominantly featured a fastball and a slider. The Nationals developed and implemented a plan to groom Barrett for a return to the major leagues during the 2019 season. After the Senators concluded their regular season, during which Barrett recorded a 2.75 ERA and 31 saves (leading the minor leagues), Harrisburg manager Matt LeCroy announced that Barrett would be promoted to the Nationals for the first time in more than four years. The Nationals officially selected Barrett's contract on September 4, 2019. Barrett appeared in a game for the first time since the 2015 season on September 7, pitching a scoreless inning in relief against the Atlanta Braves and picking up his first strikeout since August 1, 2015, as he caught All-Star Ronald Acuña Jr. looking on a slider. He made 3 relief appearances in 2019 with a 15.43 ERA.

The Nationals finished the year with a 93–69 record, clinching a wild card spot and eventually winning the 2019 World Series over the Astros. Barrett did not take part in any postseason action but still won his first world championship as he was still on the Nationals' 40-man roster at the time. Barrett struggled to a 10.80 ERA in 2 games for the Nationals in 2020. Barrett was outrighted off of the Nationals 40-man roster on October 9, 2020, and elected free agency the next day. He re-signed with the Nationals on a minor league deal on November 5, 2020.

Barrett spent the 2021 season in the minors, splitting time between the Triple-A Rochester Red Wings, Double-A Harrisburg Senators, and the Single-A Fredericksburg Nationals, posting a 2.13 ERA in 33 total appearances. After the end of the MiLB season, he was a member of the Tigres del Licey (Dominican Winter League). On November 7, 2021, Barrett elected free agency.

=== Philadelphia Phillies ===
On March 8, 2022, Barrett signed a minor league contract with the Philadelphia Phillies. He appeared in 15 games for the Triple-A Lehigh Valley IronPigs, but struggled to a 12.83 ERA with 15 strikeouts in 13.1 innings of work. On July 4, Barrett retired from professional baseball.

== Coaching career ==
Shortly after his retirement, Barrett announced that he would be staying with the Triple-A Lehigh Valley IronPigs to serve as the team's bullpen coach for the remainder of the 2022 season. Prior to the 2024 season, he was announced as the minor league complex & rehab pitching coordinator for the Phillies minor league system.

In 2026, Barrett was named as the Manager of the Clearwater Threshers the Philadelphia Phillies Single-A affiliate.

== Personal life ==
Barrett met Kendyl Mygatt while a student at the University of Mississippi. She had transferred to Ole Miss from Texas Tech, and played soccer at both schools. They married on October 20, 2012. The couple have a daughter who was born in 2017 and a son who was born in 2020. Barrett is a Christian.
