= 2014 Washington Nationals season =

2014 Washington Nationals
- National League East champions
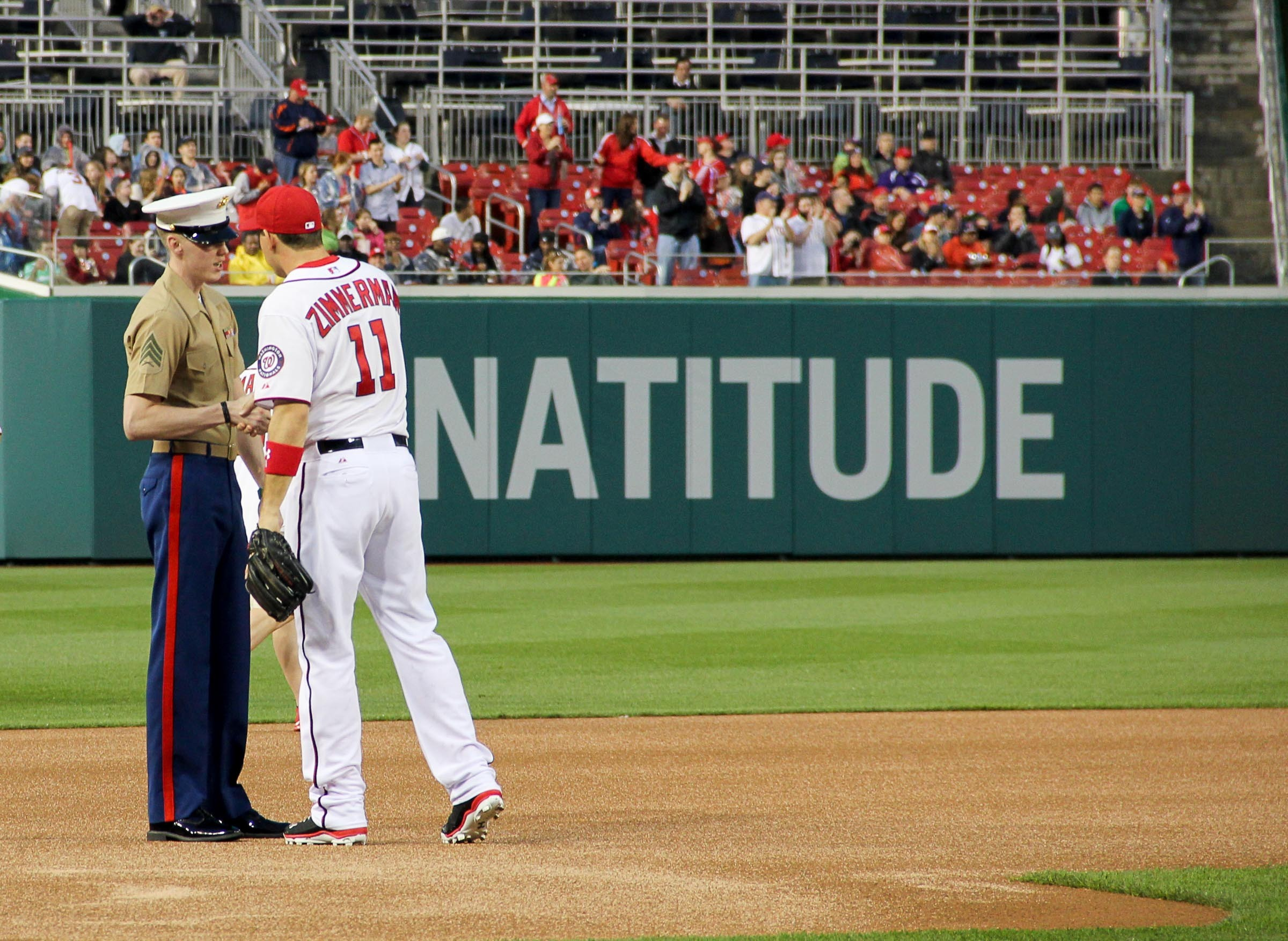
- League: National League
- Division: East
- Ballpark: Nationals Park
- City: Washington, D.C.
- Record: 96–66 (.593)
- Divisional place: 1st
- Owners: Lerner Enterprises
- General managers: Mike Rizzo
- Managers: Matt Williams
- Television: MASN; WUSA (Bob Carpenter, FP Santangelo)
- Radio: WJFK 106.7 FM; Washington Nationals Radio Network (Charlie Slowes, Dave Jageler)

The 2014 Washington Nationals season was the Nationals' tenth season for the baseball franchise of Major League Baseball in the District of Columbia, the seventh season at Nationals Park, and the 46th since the original team was started in Montreal, Quebec, Canada. They finished the regular season with a record of 96–66, first place in the National League East and with the best record in the entire National League. However, they lost to the eventual World Series champion San Francisco Giants in the NLDS in four games.

== Offseason ==
On October 31, 2013, the Nationals signed Matt Williams, previously the third base coach for the Arizona Diamondbacks, as the new manager, replacing the retiring Davey Johnson. On November 25, 2013, they traded Fernando Abad to the Oakland Athletics for minor-leaguer John Wooten. They also traded relief pitcher Ian Krol and utility infielder Steve Lombardozzi Jr., along with pitching prospect Robbie Ray, to the Detroit Tigers for starting pitcher Doug Fister on December 2, 2013, and acquired relief pitcher Jerry Blevins from the Oakland Athletics on December 11. The next day brought the signing of veteran outfielder Nate McLouth from the Baltimore Orioles, and on December 19, 2013, the Nationals sold Corey Brown to Oakland. On February 13, 2014, the Nationals traded Nathan Karns to the Tampa Bay Rays in exchange for José Lobatón, Felipe Rivero and Drew Vettleson. On March 14, 2014, Washington traded Koyie Hill to the Philadelphia Phillies for a player to be named later or cash, and the following day the Nationals received Brandon Laird from the Kansas City Royals for a player to be named later or cash.

== Spring training ==
The Nationals held their 2014 spring training in Viera, Florida, with home games played at Space Coast Stadium.

The Nationals finished their spring training schedule with a 15–13 record, good for sixth in the Grapefruit League. Among projected starters, catcher Wilson Ramos led the team with a .385 batting average, driving in 13 runs. Young infielder Zach Walters hit at a .379 clip in 29 AB in his quest to make the Opening Day roster. In the battle for the position of Opening Day second baseman, Anthony Rendon had 13 H, 6 RBI, and a .289 average, while Danny Espinosa hit only .226 in 53 AB.

For the most part, the pitchers were solid throughout the spring, posting a 3.68 ERA and allowing only 11 HR (compared with the 28 hit by the Nationals). 2013 Cy Young candidate Jordan Zimmermann was dominant, compiling a 0.50 ERA with 15 strikeouts in 18 innings pitched. Rafael Soriano, however, had an extremely rough spring, as he finished with a 14.29 ERA. The Nationals, though, are still confident with him as their closer to start the season. Newly acquired left-handed reliever Jerry Blevins impressed with only 3 hits allowed in 9.1 innings pitched. Doug Fister, acquired in an offseason trade with the Detroit Tigers was only able to get through 5.1 innings this spring, struggling with inflammation in his elbow and a strained lateral muscle.

=== Team news ===
On March 19, the Nationals announced that for the third straight season, Stephen Strasburg would be the Opening Day starting pitcher. They opened on the road against the New York Mets on March 31. The Nationals home opener was April 4 against the Atlanta Braves.

== Regular season ==
=== Opening Day ===
On March 31, the Nationals began the regular season at Citi Field against the New York Mets, winning 9–7 in 10 innings. The score was tied 5–5 at the end of 9 innings, but in the top of the 10th Ian Desmond hit a sacrifice fly to score Jayson Werth, and Anthony Rendon hit a 3-run home run. The Mets rallied in the bottom of the 10th with a 2-run home run by David Wright, but were unable to catch up completely. The winning pitcher was Nationals reliever Aaron Barrett, who made his Major League debut with a perfect 9th inning, striking out two Mets. The losing pitcher was Mets reliever Jeurys Familia, who surrendered the sacrifice fly to Desmond.

During the game, catcher Wilson Ramos suffered an injury to his left hand and was removed in the 7th inning, replaced by José Lobatón. Later tests revealed that he had broken the hamate bone and was expected to be on the disabled list for 4–6 weeks.

Opening Day Starters
Name	Position
Denard Span	CF
Ryan Zimmerman	3B
Jayson Werth	RF
Wilson Ramos	C
Bryce Harper	LF
Ian Desmond	SS
Adam LaRoche	1B
Anthony Rendon	2B
Stephen Strasburg	SP

=== April ===
Completing their opening series in New York on April 2 and 3, the Nationals swept the Mets to begin the season 3–0, accomplishing the feat despite the Ramos injury and a late scratch of starting pitcher Jordan Zimmermann (due to flu-like symptoms) before the third game of the series. Zimmermann was replaced by Tanner Roark, who was originally scheduled to pitch the following day. Much of the victory was due to the weakness of the Mets bullpen, who combined to surrender 12 of the 22 runs the Nats scored in the series.

The Nationals home opener was on Friday, April 4 against the Atlanta Braves, who went 13–6 against the Nats in the 2013 season. Although they lost that game and the one the next day, the Nationals won the third game of the series and then proceeded to sweep the next series against the Miami Marlins to finish their first homestand 4–2 (7–2 overall). During that homestand, the team suffered from two health issues. Ryan Zimmerman left the April 5 game early with a sore throwing shoulder later described by manager Matt Williams as degenerative, but adjusted his throwing motion and returned to the starting lineup in the April 9 game. Meanwhile, Scott Hairston went on the 15-day disabled list with a left oblique strain and was replaced by Tyler Moore.

The Nationals then traveled to Atlanta to face the Braves again on April 11–13, followed by a trip to Miami on April 14–16. They lost the first two games of the road trip, and suffered additional injuries. On the 11th, Denard Span collided with Braves second baseman Dan Uggla on the basepaths and was subsequently put on the 7-day concussion disabled list. The Nats called up outfielder Steven Souza to replace Span and, concerned about overworking the bullpen, optioned Aaron Barrett to the AAA Syracuse Chiefs and called up reliever Blake Treinen. The next day, Ryan Zimmerman got picked off second base and broke his thumb diving back into the bag. Zimmerman is expected to be out 4–6 weeks. The Nats placed Zimmerman on the 15-day disabled list and called up infielder Zach Walters in response. The Braves completed the sweep the next day. The Nationals took two games out of three in Miami before returning home.

In the next homestand, the Nationals hosted four games against the St. Louis Cardinals on April 17–20, three against the Los Angeles Angels of Anaheim on April 21–23, and four against the San Diego Padres on April 24–27. They split the series with the Cardinals, two games apiece. On the 18th, they optioned Treinen back to AAA Syracuse and called up left-hander Xavier Cedeño, citing a desire to give Treinen time to work up to being a starting pitcher, and on the 19th they reinstated Denard Span from the 7-day concussion disabled list, optioning Souza back to Syracuse. The 3-game series against the Angels was their first interleague series of 2014. The Nationals lost the first two games of the series, especially notable because in the game on April 22, the Angels' Albert Pujols hit his 499th and 500th career home runs off of starter Taylor Jordan, becoming the twenty-sixth member of the 500 home run club. The Nats did avoid the sweep with a four-run walk-off rally in the bottom of the ninth inning on April 23. They went on to split the series with the Padres, but Bryce Harper injured his left thumb on April 25; the injury was initially believed to be a jammed thumb, but was later reevaluated as a sprain, forcing the Nationals to put Harper on the 15-day disabled list and again call up Steven Souza from AAA Syracuse. The game of April 26 was notable for Nationals starter Tanner Roark pitching his first career complete game shutout.

The Nationals finished the month of April with a road trip to play two games against the Houston Astros in interleague play on April 29–30. Before the series, it was announced that Harper's thumb injury was even more serious than previously reported, requiring surgery and sidelining him for at least two months. The Nationals also optioned starter Taylor Jordan to AAA Syracuse, calling up right-handed reliever Ryan Mattheus; the Nats had sufficient off-days that they believed they could go with a four-man rotation until Doug Fister's projected return on May 6. The Nationals then proceeded to sweep the short series against the Astros, and Jordan Zimmermann won his 45th game as a National, surpassing Liván Hernández for the club record since the team moved from Montreal in 2005.

=== June ===
Although at 5 hours 22 minutes not the longest Nationals game in terms of time elapsed, the 16-inning game on June 24, 2014, against the Milwaukee Brewers at Miller Park in Milwaukee was the longest game in Nationals history at the time in terms of the number of innings played.

=== August ===
After a 1–0 win against the Arizona Diamondbacks in Nationals Park, Washington's winning streak extended to 10. Of those 10 victories, seven were by one run and six were walk-off wins.

=== September ===
Washington defeated the Los Angeles Dodgers, 8–5, in a 14-inning game on September 3 that lasted 5 hours 34 minutes – the longest game in Nationals history at the time in terms of time elapsed.

On September 16, the Nationals defeated the Atlanta Braves, 3-0, in Atlanta to clinch the National League East Division for the second time in three years. On September 26, in the first game of a doubleheader at Nationals Park, the Nationals defeated the Miami Marlins 4-0 and clinched the best record in the National League, also for the second time in three years.

On September 28, in the final game of the regular season, Jordan Zimmermann threw the first no-hitter in Nationals history in a 1-0 victory over the Marlins at Nationals Park. It was the fifth no-hitter in the history of the franchise since it began play in Montreal in 1969, and the first since Dennis Martínez pitched a perfect game for the Montreal Expos on July 28, 1991 against the Los Angeles Dodgers. (Note: The other previous no-hitters in Montreal-Washington franchise history were by Bill Stoneman against the Philadelphia Phillies on April 17, 1969, by Stoneman against the New York Mets on October 2, 1972, and by Charlie Lea against the San Francisco Giants on May 10, 1981. (See Svrluga, Barry, "Masterpieces", The Washington Post, September 29, 2014, Page D9.)) It was also the first no-hitter for a Washington major-league baseball pitcher since Bobby Burke of the original Washington Senators pitched one against the Boston Red Sox in a game at Griffith Stadium on August 8, 1931, and only the third in history for a Washington major-league team. (Note: The only other no-hitter in Washington major-league baseball history was by Walter Johnson for the original Washington Senators against the Boston Red Sox on July 1, 1920. (See Svrluga, Barry, "Masterpieces", The Washington Post, September 29, 2014, Page D9.)) It was also only the fifth no-hitter in major-league baseball history pitched in the last game of the regular season; coincidentally, the last time it had happened was when Henderson Álvarez, the starting pitcher for Miami in Zimmermann's no-hitter, pitched one against the Detroit Tigers on September 29, 2013, in Miami's final game of the previous season. (Note: The only other no-hitters in major-league baseball history on the last day of the regular season were by Bumpus Jones for the Cincinnati Reds against the Pittsburgh Pirates on October 15, 1892; by Vida Blue, Glenn Abbott, Paul Lindblad, and Rollie Fingers for the Oakland Athletics against the California Angels on September 28, 1975; and by Mike Witt for the California Angels against the Texas Rangers on September 30, 1984. (See Svrluga, Barry, "Masterpieces", The Washington Post, September 29, 2014, Page D9.))

In the third inning of the September 28 game, center fielder Denard Span doubled to set a single-season record for hits by a Washington Nationals player with his 184th hit of the season.

=== Season standings ===
==== National League East ====
NL East
Team	W	L	Pct.	GB	Home	Road
Washington Nationals	96	66	.593	—	51‍–‍30	45‍–‍36
Atlanta Braves	79	83	.488	17	42‍–‍39	37‍–‍44
New York Mets	79	83	.488	17	40‍–‍41	39‍–‍42
Miami Marlins	77	85	.475	19	42‍–‍39	35‍–‍46
Philadelphia Phillies	73	89	.451	23	37‍–‍44	36‍–‍45

==== National League Wild Card ====
Division leaders
Team	W	L	Pct.
Washington Nationals	96	66	.593
Los Angeles Dodgers	94	68	.580
St. Louis Cardinals	90	72	.556

Wild Card teams (Top 2 teams qualify for postseason)
Team	W	L	Pct.	GB
Pittsburgh Pirates	88	74	.543	—
San Francisco Giants	88	74	.543	—
Milwaukee Brewers	82	80	.506	6
New York Mets	79	83	.488	9
Atlanta Braves	79	83	.488	9
Miami Marlins	77	85	.475	11
San Diego Padres	77	85	.475	11
Cincinnati Reds	76	86	.469	12
Philadelphia Phillies	73	89	.451	15
Chicago Cubs	73	89	.451	15
Colorado Rockies	66	96	.407	22
Arizona Diamondbacks	64	98	.395	24

=== Record vs. opponents ===
2014 National League record Source: MLB Standings Grid – 2014
Team	AZ	ATL	CHC	CIN	COL	LAD	MIA	MIL	NYM	PHI	PIT	SD	SF	STL	WSH	AL
Arizona	–	3–3	5–2	3–4	9–10	4–15	3–4	3–4	2–4	2–4	3–4	12–7	6–13	1–5	1–6	7–13
Atlanta	3–3	–	5–1	5–2	4–3	1–6	9–10	5–2	9–10	11–8	3–4	3–4	1–5	2–4	11–8	7–13
Chicago	2–5	1–5	–	8–11	5–2	3–4	4–2	11–8	5–2	3–3	5–14	3–4	2–4	9–10	3–4	9–11
Cincinnati	4–3	2–5	11–8	–	3–4	3–4	4–3	10–9	2–4	3–3	12–7	1–5	5–2	7–12	3–3	6–14
Colorado	10–9	3–4	2–5	4–3	–	6–13	3–4	1–6	3–4	3–3	2–4	10–9	10–9	1–5	1–5	7–13
Los Angeles	15–4	6–1	4–3	4–3	13–6	–	3–3	1–5	4–2	3–4	2–5	12–7	10–9	4–3	2–4	11–9
Miami	4–3	10–9	2–4	3–4	4–3	3–3	–	3–4	8–11	9–10	2–4	3–4	3–4	4–2	6–13	13–7
Milwaukee	4–3	2–5	8–11	9–10	6–1	5–1	4–3	–	4–3	3–4	12–7	3–3	2–4	7–12	2–4	11–9
New York	4–2	10–9	2–5	4–2	4–3	2–4	11–8	3–4	–	13–6	3–4	3–3	1–6	4–3	4–15	11–9
Philadelphia	4–2	8–11	3–3	3–3	3–3	4–3	10–9	4–3	6–13	–	1–6	4–3	2–5	4–3	10–9	7–13
Pittsburgh	4–3	4–3	14–5	7–12	4–2	5–2	4–2	7–12	4–3	6–1	–	3–3	4–2	8–11	3–4	11–9
San Diego	7–12	4–3	4–3	5–1	9–10	7–12	4–3	3–3	3–3	3–4	3–3	–	10–9	3–4	3–4	9–11
San Francisco	13–6	5–1	4–2	2–5	9–10	9–10	4–3	4–2	6–1	5–2	2–4	9–10	–	4–3	2–5	10–10
St. Louis	5–1	4–2	10–9	12–7	5–1	3–4	2–4	12–7	3–4	3–4	11–8	4–3	3–4	–	5–2	8–12
Washington	6–1	8–11	4–3	3–3	5–1	4–2	13–6	4–2	15–4	9–10	4–3	4–3	5–2	2–5	–	10–10

=== Opening Day lineup ===
Opening Day Starters
Name	Position
Denard Span	Center fielder
Ryan Zimmerman	Third baseman
Jayson Werth	Right fielder
Wilson Ramos	Catcher
Bryce Harper	Left fielder
Ian Desmond	Shortstop
Adam LaRoche	First baseman
Anthony Rendon	Second baseman
Stephen Strasburg	Starting pitcher

=== Notable transactions ===
- July 1, 2014: The Nationals sold minor-leaguer Brock Peterson to the Los Angeles Dodgers.
- July 31, 2014: The Nationals traded Zach Walters to the Cleveland Indians for Asdrúbal Cabrera and cash.

=== Major league debuts ===
- Aaron Barrett (March 31, 2014)
- Taylor Hill (June 25, 2014)
- Steven Souza Jr. (April 13, 2014)
- Michael A. Taylor (August 12, 2014)
- Blake Treinen (April 12, 2014)

=== Attendance ===
The Nationals drew 2,579,389 fans at Nationals Park during the regular season in 2014, their third-highest attendance since arriving in Washington in 2005. It placed them seventh in attendance for the season among the 15 National League teams. Their highest attendance at a home game was on April 4, when they drew 42,834 for their home opener against the Atlanta Braves, while their lowest was 20,869 for a game against the Miami Marlins on April 10. Their average home attendance was 31,844 per game, third-highest since their arrival in Washington.

=== Game log ===
Legend
	Nationals win
	Nationals loss
	Postponement
**Bold**	Nationals team member

2014 game log
March (1–0)

#	Date	Opponent	Score	Win	Loss	Save	Attendance	Record
1	March 31	@ Mets	9–7 (10)	**Barrett** (1–0)	Familia (0–1)		42,442	1–0

April (15–12)

#	Date	Opponent	Score	Win	Loss	Save	Attendance	Record
2	April 2	@ Mets	5–1	**González** (1–0)	Colón (0–1)		29,146	2–0
3	April 3	@ Mets	8–2	**Roark** (1–0)	Wheeler (0–1)		20,561	3–0
4	April 4	Braves	2–1	Avilán (1–0)	**Clippard** (0–1)	Kimbrel (3)	42,834	3–1
5	April 5	Braves	6–2	Teherán (1–1)	**Strasburg** (0–1)		37,841	3–2
6	April 6	Braves	2–1	**Blevins** (1–0)	Wood (1–1)	**Soriano** (1)	34,327	4–2
7	April 8	Marlins	5–0	**González** (2–0)	Álvarez (0–2)		21,728	5–2
8	April 9	Marlins	10–7	**Clippard** (1–1)	Mármol (0–1)	**Soriano** (2)	21,190	6–2
9	April 10	Marlins	7–1	**Strasburg** (1–1)	Koehler (1–1)		20,869	7–2
10	April 11	@ Braves	7–6 (10)	Avilán (2–1)	**Blevins** (1–1)		28,243	7–3
11	April 12	@ Braves	6–3	Wood (2–1)	**Jordan** (0–1)	Kimbrel (5)	36,621	7–4
12	April 13	@ Braves	10–2	Harang (2–1)	**González** (2–1)		27,919	7–5
13	April 14	@ Marlins	9–2	**Zimmermann** (1–0)	Hand (0–1)		18,788	8–5
14	April 15	@ Marlins	11–2	Koehler (2–1)	**Strasburg** (1–2)		19,931	8–6
15	April 16	@ Marlins	6–3	**Storen** (1–0)	Dunn (0–2)	**Soriano** (3)	20,178	9–6
16	April 17	Cardinals	8–0	Wainwright (3–1)	**Jordan** (0–2)		28,987	9–7
17	April 18	Cardinals	3–1	**González** (3–1)	Wacha (2–1)	**Soriano** (4)	31,237	10–7
18	April 19	Cardinals	4–3	Lynn (4–0)	**Zimmermann** (1–1)	Rosenthal (5)	41,084	10–8
19	April 20	Cardinals	3–2	**Soriano** (1–0)	Maness (0–1)		27,653	11–8
20	April 21	Angels	4–2	Salas (1–0)	**Clippard** (1–2)	Frieri (2)	24,371	11–9
21	April 22	Angels	7–2	Skaggs (2–0)	**Jordan** (0–3)		21,915	11–10
22	April 23	Angels	5–4	**Storen** (2–0)	Frieri (0–2)		22,504	12–10
23	April 24	Padres	4–3 (12)	Torres (1–0)	**Stammen** (0–1)	Street (8)	22,904	12–11
24	April 25	Padres	11–1	**Strasburg** (2–2)	Erlin (1–3)		25,497	13–11
25	April 26	Padres	4–0	**Roark** (2–0)	Cashner (2–3)		31,590	14–11
26	April 27	Padres	4–2	Kennedy (2–3)	**Detwiler** (0–1)	Street (9)	34,873	14–12
27	April 29	@ Astros	4–3	**Clippard** (2–2)	Fields (0–3)	**Soriano** (5)	23,394	15–12
28	April 30	@ Astros	7–0	**Zimmermann** (2–1)	Oberholtzer (0–5)		25,172	16–12

May (11–15)

#	Date	Opponent	Score	Win	Loss	Save	Attendance	Record
29	May 2	@ Phillies	5–3	**Blevins** (2–1)	Adams (1–1)	**Soriano** (6)	31,945	17–12
30	May 3	@ Phillies	7–2	Burnett (2–1)	**Roark** (2–1)		33,441	17–13
31	May 4	@ Phillies	1–0	Hernández (2–1)	**González** (3–2)	Papelbon (9)	37,490	17–14
32	May 5	Dodgers	4–0	**Barrett** (2–0)	Greinke (5–1)		25,447	18–14
33	May 6	Dodgers	8–3	Kershaw (2–0)	**Treinen** (0–1)		30,143	18–15
34	May 7	Dodgers	3–2	**Strasburg** (3–2)	Haren (4–1)	**Soriano** (7)	34,756	19–15
35	May 9	@ Athletics	8–0	Milone (1–3)	**Fister** (0–1)		20,159	19–16
36	May 10	@ Athletics	4–3 (10)	Doolittle (1–2)	**Storen** (2–1)		36,067	19–17
37	May 11	@ Athletics	9–1	Kazmir (5–1)	**González** (3–3)		28,205	19–18
38	May 12	@ Diamondbacks	6–5	**Clippard** (3–2)	Reed (1–3)	**Soriano** (8)	16,555	20–18
39	May 13	@ Diamondbacks	3–1	Arroyo (4–2)	**Strasburg** (3–3)		19,025	20–19
40	May 14	@ Diamondbacks	5–1	**Clippard** (4–2)	Ziegler (0–1)		18,325	21–19
41	May 16	Mets	5–2	**Roark** (3–1)	Niese (2–3)	**Soriano** (9)	34,413	22–19
42	May 17	Mets	5–2	Colón (3–5)	**González** (3–4)	Mejía (1)	41,225	22–20
43	May 18	Mets	6–3	**Zimmermann** (3–1)	Wheeler (1–4)	**Soriano** (10)	36,965	23–20
44	May 19	Reds	4–3 (15)	Ondrusek (1–2)	**Detwiler** (0–2)		24,505	23–21
45	May 20	Reds	9–4	**Fister** (1–1)	Cueto (4–3)		26,455	24–21
46	May 21	Reds	2–1	Simón (6–2)	**Roark** (3–2)	Chapman (3)	28,944	24–22
47	May 22	@ Pirates	3–1	Vólquez (2–4)	**Treinen** (0–2)	Melançon (8)	23,468	24–23
48	May 23	@ Pirates	4–3	Morton (1–6)	**Zimmermann** (3–2)	Grilli (5)	31,592	24–24
49	May 24	@ Pirates	3–2	Hughes (3–1)	**Strasburg** (3–4)	Melançon (9)	38,889	24–25
50	May 25	@ Pirates	5–2	**Fister** (2–1)	Liriano (0–5)	**Soriano** (11)	38,047	25–25
51	May 26	Marlins	3–2	Eovaldi (4–2)	**Roark** (3–3)	Cishek (11)	33,677	25–26
–	May 27	Marlins	Postponed (rain) Rescheduled for September 26 as part of a doubleheader					
52	May 28	Marlins	8–5 (10)	Slowey (1–0)	**Blevins** (2–2)		24,830	25–27
53	May 30	Rangers	9–2	**Strasburg** (4–4)	Lewis (4–4)		31,659	26–27
54	May 31	Rangers	10–2	**Fister** (3–1)	Tepesch (2–1)		35,164	27–27

June (17–11)

#	Date	Opponent	Score	Win	Loss	Save	Attendance	Record
55	June 1	Rangers	2–0	Darvish (5–2)	**Roark** (3–4)	Soria (11)	32,813	27–28
56	June 3	Phillies	7–0	**Zimmermann** (4–2)	Buchanan (1–2)		25,291	28–28
57	June 4	Phillies	8–4	**Strasburg** (5–4)	Burnett (3–5)		33,614	29–28
58	June 5	Phillies	4–2	**Fister** (4–1)	Kendrick (1–6)	**Soriano** (12)	33,016	30–28
59	June 6	@ Padres	6–0	**Roark** (4–4)	Ross (6–5)		25,346	31–28
60	June 7	@ Padres	4–3 (11)	Benoit (2–0)	**Stammen** (0–2)		29,172	31–29
61	June 8	@ Padres	6–0	**Zimmermann** (5–2)	Stults (2–7)		27,046	32–29
62	June 9	@ Giants	9–2	**Strasburg** (6–4)	Vogelsong (4–3)		41,597	33–29
63	June 10	@ Giants	2–1	**Fister** (5–1)	Bumgarner (8–4)	**Soriano** (13)	41,545	34–29
64	June 11	@ Giants	6–2	**Roark** (5–4)	Cain (1–4)		41,404	35–29
65	June 12	@ Giants	7–1	Hudson (7–2)	**Treinen** (0–3)		41,067	35–30
66	June 13	@ Cardinals	1–0	Lynn (7–4)	**Zimmermann** (5–3)	Rosenthal (18)	41,519	35–31
67	June 14	@ Cardinals	4–1	Choate (1–2)	**Strasburg** (6–5)	Rosenthal (19)	44,785	35–32
68	June 15	@ Cardinals	5–2	García (3–0)	**Fister** (5–2)	Rosenthal (20)	45,325	35–33
69	June 17	Astros	6–5	**Roark** (6–4)	Keuchel (8–4)	**Soriano** (14)	29,960	36–33
70	June 18	Astros	6–5	**Barrett** (3–0)	Downs (1–1)	**Soriano** (15)	25,453	37–33
71	June 19	Braves	3–0	Floyd (2–2)	**Zimmermann** (5–4)	Kimbrel (21)	32,193	37–34
72	June 20	Braves	6–4 (13)	Buchter (1–0)	**Blevins** (2–3)	Walden (2)	36,608	37–35
73	June 21	Braves	3–0	**Fister** (6–2)	Teherán (6–5)	**Soriano** (16)	40,677	38–35
74	June 22	Braves	4–1	**Roark** (7–4)	Santana (5–5)	**Soriano** (17)	39,473	39–35
75	June 23	@ Brewers	3–0	**González** (4–4)	Garza (4–5)	**Clippard** (1)	31,102	40–35
76	June 24	@ Brewers	4–2 (16)	**Clippard** (5–2)	Fiers (0–1)	**Soriano** (18)	30,149	41–35
77	June 25	@ Brewers	9–2	Estrada (7–4)	**Strasburg** (6–6)		39,049	41–36
78	June 26	@ Cubs	5–3	Ramirez (1–1)	**Stammen** (0–3)	Rondón (9)	28,867	41–37
79	June 27	@ Cubs	7–2	Hammel (7–5)	**Roark** (7–5)		30,683	41–38
80	June 28 (1)	@ Cubs	3–0	**González** (5–4)	Beeler (0–1)	**Soriano** (19)	35,770	42–38
81	June 28 (2)	@ Cubs	7–2	**Treinen** (1–3)	Samardzija (2–7)	**Detwiler** (1)	32,267	43–38
82	June 30	Rockies	7–3	**Zimmermann** (6–4)	Flande (0–1)		33,660	44–38

July (14–10)

#	Date	Opponent	Score	Win	Loss	Save	Attendance	Record
83	July 1	Rockies	7–1	**Strasburg** (7–6)	Friedrich (0–3)		26,033	45–38
84	July 2	Rockies	4–3	**Fister** (7–2)	Belisle (2–4)	**Soriano** (20)	28,943	46–38
85	July 4	Cubs	7–2	Hammel (8–5)	**Roark** (7–6)		41,274	46–39
86	July 5	Cubs	13–0	**González** (6–4)	Villanueva (4–6)		38,473	47–39
87	July 6	Cubs	2–1	**Clippard** (6–2)	Strop (1–4)	**Soriano** (21)	32,941	48–39
88	July 7	Orioles	8–2 (11)	McFarland (2–2)	**Stammen** (0–4)		35,126	48–40
–	July 8	Orioles	Postponed (rain) Rescheduled for August 4					
89	July 9	@ Orioles	6–2	**Fister** (8–2)	Norris (7–6)		35,575	49–40
90	July 10	@ Orioles	4–3	Chen (9–3)	**González** (6–5)	Britton (15)	30,417	49–41
91	July 11	@ Phillies	6–2	Burnett (6–8)	**Zimmermann** (6–5)		30,094	49–42
92	July 12	@ Phillies	5–3 (10)	**Detwiler** (1–2)	Diekman (3–3)	Soriano (22)	32,072	50–42
93	July 13	@ Phillies	10–3	**Roark** (8–6)	Kendrick (4–9)		30,185	51–42
**All–Star Break (July 14–17)**
94	July 18	Brewers	4–2	Lohse (10–4)	**Strasburg** (7–7)	Rodríguez (28)	39,373	51–43
95	July 19	Brewers	8–3	**Roark** (9–6)	Garza (6–7)		38,649	52–43
96	July 20	Brewers	5–4	**Soriano** (2–0)	Wooten (1–4)		36,373	53–43
97	July 21	@ Rockies	7–2	**Fister** (9–2)	Morales (5–5)		33,082	54–43
98	July 22	@ Rockies	7–4	**Stammen** (1–4)	Brown (0–1)	**Soriano** (23)	36,874	55–43
99	July 23	@ Rockies	6–4	de la Rosa (11–6)	**Strasburg** (7–8)		30,728	55–44
100	July 25	@ Reds	4–1	**Roark** (10–6)	Simón (12–5)	**Soriano** (24)	38,812	56–44
101	July 26	@ Reds	1–0	Cueto (11–6)	**González** (6–6)	Chapman (22)	32,999	56–45
102	July 27	@ Reds	4–2	**Fister** (10–2)	Latos (2–3)	**Soriano** (25)	31,982	57–45
103	July 28	@ Marlins	7–6	Dunn (8–5)	**Soriano** (2–1)		20,027	57–46
104	July 29	@ Marlins	3–0	Álvarez (8–5)	**Strasburg** (7–9)	Cishek (27)	22,672	57–47
105	July 30	@ Marlins	4–3	**Roark** (11–6)	Hand (2–3)	**Storen** (1)	26,319	58–47
106	July 31	Phillies	10–4	Bastardo (5–4)	**González** (6–7)		35,722	58–48

August (19–10)

#	Date	Opponent	Score	Win	Loss	Save	Attendance	Record
107	August 1	Phillies	2–1	Hernández (6–8)	**Fister** (10–3)	Papelbon (26)	28,410	58–49
108	August 2	Phillies	11–0	**Zimmermann** (7–5)	Burnett (6–11)		36,155	59–49
109	August 3	Phillies	4–0	**Strasburg** (8–9)	Hamels (6–6)		30,038	60–49
110	August 4	Orioles	7–3	Gausman (6–3)	**Roark** (11–7)		42,181	60–50
111	August 5	Mets	6–1	Wheeler (7–8)	**González** (6–8)		40,686	60–51
112	August 6	Mets	7–1	**Fister** (11–3)	Niese (5–8)		26,701	61–51
113	August 7	Mets	5–3 (13)	**Stammen** (2–4)	Torres (5–5)		38,611	62–51
114	August 8	@ Braves	7–6	Santana (11–6)	**Strasburg** (8–10)	Kimbrel (33)	32,707	62–52
115	August 9	@ Braves	4–1 (11)	**Clippard** (7–2)	Carpenter (4–2)	**Soriano** (26)	36,832	63–52
116	August 10	@ Braves	3–1	Wood (8–9)	**González** (6–9)	Kimbrel (34)	18,191	63–53
117	August 12	@ Mets	7–1	**Fister** (12–3)	Montero (0–3)		21,200	64–53
118	August 13	@ Mets	3–2	**Zimmermann** (8–5)	Colón (11–10)	**Soriano** (27)	21,364	65–53
119	August 14	@ Mets	4–1	**Strasburg** (9–10)	Gee (4–5)	**Soriano** (28)	22,782	66–53
120	August 15	Pirates	5–4	**Roark** (12–7)	Morton (5–12)	**Soriano** (29)	36,945	67–53
121	August 16	Pirates	4–3	**Thornton** (1–0)	Wilson (3–3)		41,880	68–53
122	August 17	Pirates	6–5 (11)	**Detwiler** (2–2)	Cumpton (3–4)		34,430	69–53
123	August 18	Diamondbacks	5–4 (11)	**Stammen** (3–4)	Harris (0–3)		21,292	70–53
124	August 19	Diamondbacks	8–1	**Strasburg** (10–10)	Anderson (7–5)		26,827	71–53
125	August 20	Diamondbacks	3–2	**Soriano** (3–1)	Marshall (4–3)		24,113	72–53
126	August 21	Diamondbacks	1–0	**Soriano** (4–1)	Pérez (2–3)		32,311	73–53
127	August 22	Giants	10–3	Hudson (9–9)	**Fister** (12–4)		33,718	73–54
128	August 23	Giants	6–2	**Zimmermann** (9–5)	Lincecum (10–9)		34,137	74–54
129	August 24	Giants	14–6	**Stammen** (4–4)	Affeldt (3–2)		35,476	75–54
130	August 25	@ Phillies	3–2	Burnett (7–14)	**Roark** (12–8)	Papelbon (32)	23,089	75–55
131	August 26	@ Phillies	4–3	Giles (3–1)	**Clippard** (7–3)	Papelbon (33)	25,238	75–56
132	August 27	@ Phillies	8–4	Kendrick (7–11)	**Fister** (12–5)		33,183	75–57
133	August 29	@ Mariners	8–3	**Zimmermann** (10–5)	Hernández (13–5)		35,616	76–57
134	August 30	@ Mariners	3–1	**Strasburg** (11–10)	Elías (9–12)	**Soriano** (30)	32,894	77–57
135	August 31	@ Mariners	5–3	Iwakuma (13–6)	**Roark** (12–9)	Rodney (39)	26,221	77–58

September (19–8)

#	Date	Opponent	Score	Win	Loss	Save	Attendance	Record
136	September 1	@ Dodgers	6–4	**González** (7–9)	Hernández (8–10)	**Soriano** (31)	41,857	78–58
137	September 2	@ Dodgers	4–1	Kershaw (17–3)	**Fister** (12–6)	Jansen (39)	43,352	78–59
138	September 3	@ Dodgers	8–5 (14)	**Treinen** (2–3)	Correia (2–3)		38,404	79–59
139	September 5	Phillies	9–8 (11)	Diekman (4–4)	**Stammen** (4–5)	Papelbon (34)	27,437	79–60
140	September 6	Phillies	3–1	Burnett (8–15)	**Roark** (12–10)	Papelbon (35)	37,408	79–61
141	September 7	Phillies	3–2	**González** (8–9)	Hamels (8–7)	**Storen** (2)	29,108	80–61
142	September 8	Braves	2–1	**Fister** (13–6)	Minor (6–10)	**Storen** (3)	25,448	81–61
143	September 9	Braves	6–4	**Zimmermann** (11–5)	Santana (14–8)	**Storen** (4)	29,233	82–61
144	September 10	Braves	6–2	Harang (11–10)	**Strasburg** (11–11)		31,086	82–62
145	September 11	@ Mets	6–2	**Roark** (13–10)	Colón (13–12)		21,111	83–62
146	September 12	@ Mets	4–3	Gee (7–7)	**González** (8–10)	Mejía (26)	25,792	83–63
147	September 13	@ Mets	10–3	**Fister** (14–6)	Wheeler (10–10)		28,849	84–63
148	September 14	@ Mets	3–0	**Zimmermann** (12–5)	Niese (8–11)	**Storen** (5)	31,553	85–63
149	September 15	@ Braves	4–2	**Strasburg** (12–11)	Santana (14–9)	**Storen** (6)	18,220	86–63
150	September 16	@ Braves	3–0	**Roark** (14–10)	Harang (11–11)	**Storen** (7)	28,175	87–63
151	September 17	@ Braves	3–1	Wood (11–10)	**Detwiler** (2–3)	Kimbrel (44)	26,643	87–64
152	September 18	@ Marlins	6–2	**González** (9–10)	Hand (3–8)		18,010	88–64
153	September 19	@ Marlins	3–2	**Fister** (15–6)	Koehler (9–10)	**Storen** (8)	19,815	89–64
154	September 20	@ Marlins	3–2	**Zimmermann** (13–5)	Cosart (13–10)	**Storen** (9)	20,983	90–64
155	September 21	@ Marlins	2–1	**Strasburg** (13–11)	Eovaldi (6–13)	**Soriano** (32)	22,806	91–64
156	September 23	Mets	4–2	**Roark** (15–10)	Colón (14–13)	**Storen** (10)	30,714	92–64
–	September 24	Mets	Postponed (rain) Rescheduled for September 25 as part of a doubleheader					
157	September 25 (1)	Mets	7–4	Torres (8–5)	**Clippard** (7-4)	Mejía (28)	28,629	92–65
158	September 25 (2)	Mets	3–0	**González** (10–10)	Wheeler (11–11)	**Storen** (11)	26,439	93–65
159	September 26 (1)	Marlins	4–0	**Fister** (16–6)	Cosart (4–4)		27,920	94–65
160	September 26 (2)	Marlins	15–7	Ramos (7–0)	**Hill** (0–1)		34,190	94–66
161	September 27	Marlins	5–1	**Strasburg** (14–11)	Eovaldi (6–14)		37,529	95–66
162	September 28	Marlins	1–0	**Zimmermann** (14–5)	Álvarez (12–7)		35,085	96–66

== Postseason ==
=== Postseason game log ===
2014 postseason game log (1–3)
National League Division Series vs. NL Wild Card winner (1–3)

#	Date	Opponent	Score	Win	Loss	Save	Attendance	Series
1	October 3	Giants	3–2	Peavy (1–0)	Strasburg (0–1)	Casilla (1)	44,035	0–1
2	October 4	Giants	2–1 (18)	Petit (1–0)	Roark (0–1)	Strickland (1)	44,035	0–2
3	October 6	@ Giants	4–1	Fister (1–0)	Bumgarner (0–1)		43,627	1–2
4	October 7	@ Giants	3–2	Strickland (1–0)	Thornton (0–1)	Casilla (2)	43,464	1–3

=== Division Series ===
==== Game 1, October 3 ====
3:07 p.m. (EDT) at Nationals Park in Washington, D.C.

Team	1	2	3	4	5	6	7	8	9	R	H	E
San Francisco	0	0	1	1	0	0	1	0	0	3	12	0
Washington	0	0	0	0	0	0	2	0	0	2	6	0
WP: Jake Peavy (1–0) LP: Stephen Strasburg (0–1) Sv: Santiago Casilla (1); Home runs: SF: None; WSH: Bryce Harper (1), Asdrúbal Cabrera (1); Attendance: 44,035

==== Game 2, October 4 ====
5:37 p.m. (EDT) at Nationals Park in Washington, D.C.

Game Two of the Division Series between the Nationals and the San Francisco Giants at Nationals Park on October 4 lasted 18 innings before Brandon Belt's solo homer in the top of the 18th gave the Giants a 2-1 victory. It was the longest postseason game in Major League Baseball history by time, lasting 6 hours 23 minutes, and tied the postseason record for number of innings played. It was also the longest game in Nationals history both in terms of number of innings and time elapsed, in both cases breaking Nationals records set during the 2014 regular season.

Team	1	2	3	4	5	6	7	8	9	10	11	12	13	14	15	16	17	18	R	H	E
San Francisco	0	0	0	0	0	0	0	0	1	0	0	0	0	0	0	0	0	1	2	8	0
Washington	0	0	1	0	0	0	0	0	0	0	0	0	0	0	0	0	0	0	1	9	0
WP: Yusmeiro Petit (1–0) LP: Tanner Roark (0–1) Sv: Hunter Strickland (1); Home runs: SF: Brandon Belt (1); WAS: None; Attendance: 44,035

==== Game 3, October 6 ====
5:07 p.m. (EDT) at AT&T Park in San Francisco

Team	1	2	3	4	5	6	7	8	9	R	H	E
Washington	0	0	0	0	0	0	3	0	1	4	7	0
San Francisco	0	0	0	0	0	0	0	0	1	1	6	1
WP: Doug Fister (1–0) LP: Madison Bumgarner (0–1); Home runs: WAS: Bryce Harper (2); SF: None; Attendance: 43,627

==== Game 4, October 7 ====
9:07 p.m. (EDT) at AT&T Park in San Francisco

Team	1	2	3	4	5	6	7	8	9	R	H	E
Washington	0	0	0	0	1	0	1	0	0	2	4	1
San Francisco	0	2	0	0	0	0	1	0	x	3	8	0
WP: Hunter Strickland (1–0) LP: Matt Thornton (0–1) Sv: Santiago Casilla (2); Home runs: WAS: Bryce Harper (3); SF: None; Attendance: 43,464

== Roster ==
2014 Washington Nationals
Roster
Pitchers: 30 Aaron Barrett; 13 Jerry Blevins; 31 Xavier Cedeño; 36 Tyler Clippard; 48 Ross Detwiler; 58 Doug Fister; 47 Gio González; 55 Taylor Hill; 38 Taylor Jordan; 52 Ryan Mattheus; 57 Tanner Roark; 29 Rafael Soriano; 35 Craig Stammen; 22 Drew Storen; 37 Stephen Strasburg; 46 Matt Thornton; 64 Blake Treinen; 27 Jordan Zimmermann	Catchers: 41 Sandy León; 59 José Lobatón; 40 Wilson Ramos; Infielders: 3 Asdrúbal Cabrera; 20 Ian Desmond; 33 Greg Dobbs; 8 Danny Espinosa; 19 Kevin Frandsen; 26 Jeff Kobernus; 25 Adam LaRoche; 12 Tyler Moore; 6 Anthony Rendon; 4 Zach Walters	Outfielders: 7 Scott Hairston; 34 Bryce Harper; 15 Nate McLouth; 17 Nate Schierholtz; 21 Steven Souza; 2 Denard Span; 18 Michael Taylor; 28 Jayson Werth; 11 Ryan Zimmerman	Manager: 9 Matt Williams; Coaches: 14 Bob Henley (third base); 53 Randy Knorr (bench); 24 Matt LeCroy (bullpen); 54 Steve McCatty (pitching); 39 Rick Schu (hitting); 32 Tony Tarasco (first base); 49 Mark Weidemaier (defensive positioning)

== Statistics ==
=== Regular season ===
==== Batting ====
Table is sortable.

Note: POS = Position; G = Games played; AB = At bats; R = Runs scored; H = Hits; 2B = Doubles; 3B = Triples; HR = Home runs; RBI = Runs batted in; AVG = Batting average; SB = Stolen bases

Complete regular-season offensive statistics are available here.

POS	Player	G	AB	R	H	2B	3B	HR	RBI	AVG	SB
C	Wilson Ramos	88	341	32	91	12	0	11	47	.267	0
1B	Adam LaRoche	140	494	73	128	19	0	26	92	.259	3
2B	Danny Espinosa	114	333	31	73	14	3	8	27	.219	8
SS	Ian Desmond	154	593	73	151	26	3	24	91	.255	24
3B	Anthony Rendon	153	613	111	176	39	6	21	83	.287	17
LF	Bryce Harper	100	352	41	96	10	2	13	32	.273	2
CF	Denard Span	147	610	94	184	39	8	5	37	.302	31
RF	Jayson Werth	147	534	85	156	37	1	16	82	.292	9
UT	Ryan Zimmerman	61	214	26	60	19	1	5	38	.280	0
UT	Kevin Frandsen	105	220	17	57	8	0	1	17	.259	0
C	José Lobatón	66	214	18	50	9	0	2	12	.234	0
2B	Asdrúbal Cabrera*	49	175	20	40	9	2	5	21	.229	3
LF	Nate McLouth	79	139	10	24	6	0	1	7	.280	4
1B	Tyler Moore	42	91	8	21	2	0	4	14	.231	0
UT	Scott Hairston	61	77	6	16	4	0	1	8	.208	0
C	Sandy León	20	64	7	10	1	0	1	3	.156	0
UT	Zach Walters*	32	39	7	8	1	0	3	5	.205	0
OF	Michael Taylor	17	39	5	8	3	0	1	5	.205	0
OF	Nate Schierholtz*	23	40	3	9	1	1	1	4	.225	0
1B	Greg Dobbs*	21	28	0	6	1	0	0	2	.214	0
OF	Steven Souza	21	23	2	3	0	0	2	2	.130	0
2B	Jeff Kobernus	4	6	2	0	0	0	0	0	.250	0
P	Stephen Strasburg	34	60	3	6	1	0	0	3	.100	0
P	Tanner Roark	31	58	1	7	0	0	0	0	.121	0
P	Jordan Zimmermann	32	55	3	10	1	0	0	1	.182	0
P	Doug Fister	26	52	3	4	1	0	0	0	.077	0
P	Gio Gonzalez	27	46	3	4	1	0	1	2	.087	0
P	Blake Treinen	15	12	0	1	0	0	0	0	.083	0
P	Taylor Jordan	5	8	1	1	0	0	0	0	.125	0
P	Craig Stammen	49	7	0	2	1	0	0	0	.286	0
P	Ross Detwiler	47	2	1	0	0	0	0	0	.000	0
P	Taylor Hill	3	3	0	1	0	0	0	0	.333	0
P	Tyler Clippard	75	0	0	0	0	0	0	0	–	0
P	Xavier Cedeño	9	0	0	0	0	0	0	0	–	0
P	Jerry Blevins	64	0	0	0	0	0	0	0	–	0
P	Drew Storen	65	0	0	0	0	0	0	0	–	0
P	Ryan Mattheus	7	0	0	0	0	0	0	0	–	0
P	Matt Thornton*	18	0	0	0	0	0	0	0	–	0
P	Rafael Soriano	64	0	0	0	0	0	0	0	–	0
P	Aaron Barrett	50	0	0	0	0	0	0	0	–	0
	Team totals	162	5542	686	1403	265	27	152	635	.253	101

*Player played for multiple teams; batting statistics reflect time on Nationals only.

==== Pitching ====
Note: Pos = Position; W = Wins; L = Losses; ERA = Earned run average; G = Games pitched; GS = Games started; SV = Saves; IP = Innings pitched; H = Hits allowed; R = Runs allowed; ER = Earned runs allowed; BB = Walks allowed; K = Strikeouts

Complete regular-season pitching statistics are available here.

Pos	Player	W	L	ERA	G	GS	SV	IP	H	R	ER	BB	K
SP	Stephen Strasburg	14	11	3.14	34	34	0	215.0	198	86	75	43	242
SP	Jordan Zimmermann	14	5	2.66	32	32	0	199.2	185	67	59	29	182
SP	Tanner Roark	15	10	2.85	31	31	0	198.2	178	64	63	39	138
SP	Doug Fister	16	6	2.41	25	25	0	164.0	153	52	44	24	98
SP	Gio Gonzalez	10	10	3.57	27	27	0	158.2	134	66	63	56	162
CL	Rafael Soriano	4	1	3.19	64	0	32	62.0	51	23	22	19	59
RP	Tyler Clippard	7	4	2.18	75	0	1	70.1	47	22	17	23	82
RP	Jerry Blevins	2	3	4.87	64	0	0	57.1	48	31	31	23	66
RP	Drew Storen	2	1	1.12	65	0	11	56.1	44	8	7	11	46
RP	Aaron Barrett	3	0	2.66	50	0	0	40.2	33	17	12	20	49
RP	Craig Stammen	4	5	3.84	49	0	0	72.2	78	34	31	14	56
RP	Ross Detwiler	2	3	4.00	47	0	1	63.0	68	34	28	21	39
	Blake Treinen	2	3	2.49	15	7	0	50.2	57	17	14	13	30
	Taylor Jordan	0	3	5.61	5	5	0	25.2	34	20	16	8	17
RP	Matt Thornton*	1	0	0.00	18	0	0	11.1	10	0	0	2	8
	Taylor Hill	0	1	9.00	3	1	0	9.0	16	9	9	3	5
RP	Ryan Mattheus	0	0	1.04	7	0	0	8.2	7	1	1	4	4
RP	Xavier Cedeño	0	0	3.86	9	0	0	7.0	10	4	3	0	5
	Team totals	96	66	3.03	162	162	45	1470.2	1351	555	495	352	1288

*Player played for multiple teams; pitching statistics reflect time on Nationals only.

==== Team leaders ====
Qualifying players only.

===== Batting =====
Stat	Player	Total
Avg.	Denard Span	.302
HR	Adam LaRoche	26
RBI	Adam LaRoche	92
R	Anthony Rendon	111
H	Denard Span	184
SB	Denard Span	31

Rendon's runs scored total was the highest for any individual player in the National League during the regular season. Span's hit total set a new single-season Washington Nationals record.

===== Pitching =====
Stat	Player	Total
W	Doug Fister	16
L	Stephen Strasburg	11
ERA	Doug Fister	2.41
SO	Stephen Strasburg	242
SV	Rafael Soriano	32
IP	Stephen Strasburg	215.0

=== Postseason ===
==== Batting ====
Table is sortable.

Note: POS = Position; G = Games played; AB = At bats; R = Runs scored; H = Hits; 2B = Doubles; 3B = Triples; HR = Home runs; RBI = Runs batted in; AVG = Batting average; SB = Stolen bases

Complete postseason offensive statistics are available here.

POS	Player	G	AB	R	H	2B	3B	HR	RBI	AVG	SB
P	Aaron Barrett	2	0	0	0	0	0	0	0	–	0
P	Jerry Blevins	3	0	0	0	0	0	0	0	–	0
2B	Asdrúbal Cabrera	4	15	2	3	1	0	1	2	.200	0
P	Tyler Clippard	3	0	0	0	0	0	0	0	–	0
SS	Ian Desmond	4	18	2	3	0	0	0	0	.167	1
2B	Danny Espinosa	2	4	0	0	0	0	0	0	.000	0
P	Doug Fister	1	3	0	0	0	0	0	0	.000	0
UT	Kevin Frandsen	1	1	0	0	0	0	0	0	.000	0
P	Gio Gonzalez	1	1	0	0	0	0	0	0	.000	0
LF	Bryce Harper	4	17	4	5	1	0	3	4	.294	0
1B	Adam LaRoche	4	18	0	1	0	0	0	0	.056	0
C	José Lobatón	0	–	–	–	–	–	–	–	–	–
C	Wilson Ramos	4	17	1	2	0	0	0	0	.118	0
3B	Anthony Rendon	4	19	0	7	0	0	0	0	.368	1
P	Tanner Roark	2	1	0	0	0	0	0	0	.000	0
OF	Nate Schierholtz	4	1	0	1	1	0	0	0	1.000	0
P	Rafael Soriano	2	0	0	0	0	0	0	0	–	0
CF	Denard Span	4	19	0	2	0	0	0	0	.105	0
P	Craig Stammen	2	0	0	0	0	0	0	0	–	0
P	Drew Storen	2	0	0	0	0	0	0	0	–	0
P	Stephen Strasburg	1	1	0	0	0	0	0	0	.000	0
P	Matt Thornton	3	0	0	0	0	0	0	0	–	0
RF	Jayson Werth	4	17	0	1	0	0	0	0	.059	0
UT	Ryan Zimmerman	4	4	0	1	0	0	0	0	.250	0
P	Jordan Zimmermann	1	3	0	0	0	0	0	0	.000	0
	Totals	4	159	9	26	3	0	4	7	.164	2

==== Pitching ====
Table is sortable.

Note: Pos = Position; W = Wins; L = Losses; ERA = Earned run average; G = Games pitched; GS = Games started; SV = Saves; IP = Innings pitched; H = Hits allowed; R = Runs allowed; ER = Earned runs allowed; BB = Walks allowed; K = Strikeouts

Complete postseason pitching statistics are available here.

Pos	Player	W	L	ERA	G	GS	SV	IP	H	R	ER	BB	K
RP	Aaron Barrett	0	0	0.00	2	0	0	0.1	1	0	0	2	0
RP	Jerry Blevins	0	0	0.00	3	0	0	3.1	0	0	0	0	2
RP	Tyler Clippard	0	0	0.00	3	0	0	3.0	1	0	0	1	2
SP	Doug Fister	1	0	0.00	1	1	0	7.0	4	0	0	3	3
SP	Gio Gonzalez	0	0	0.00	1	1	0	4.0	4	2	0	1	1
SP	Tanner Roark	0	1	3.38	2	0	0	2.2	3	1	1	0	3
RP	Rafael Soriano	0	0	0.00	2	0	0	2.1	1	0	0	0	1
RP	Craig Stammen	0	0	2.25	2	0	0	4.0	3	1	1	0	2
RP	Drew Storen	0	0	6.75	2	0	0	1.1	4	1	1	0	1
SP	Stephen Strasburg	0	1	1.80	1	1	0	5.0	8	2	1	1	2
RP	Matt Thornton	0	1	3.86	3	0	0	2.1	3	1	1	2	1
SP	Jordan Zimmermann	0	0	1.04	1	1	0	8.2	3	1	1	1	6
	Totals	1	3	1.23	4	4	0	44.0	35	9	6	11	24

== Awards and honors ==
=== All-Stars ===
- Jordan Zimmermann, P
- Tyler Clippard, P

Both Zimmermann and Clippard were selected as all-stars for the second time. Zimmermann did not appear in the 2014 Major League Baseball All-Star Game due to injury. (Note: Clippard's previous all-star appearance had been in 2011. Zimmermann's previous selection had been in 2013, and injury also had prevented him from appearing in that game.)

=== Annual awards ===
==== Manager of the Year ====
- National League Manager of the Year: Matt Williams

Matt Williams became only the fourth Major League baseball manager to win the Manager of the Year award in his first season as a manager, joining Houston's Hal Lanier, who won in 1986, San Francisco's Dusty Baker, who won in 1993, and Florida's Joe Girardi, who won in 2006.

Williams also became the second Washington Nationals manager to win the award, as well as the second to do so in three years, Davey Johnson having won in 2012. Williams was the fourth manager to win the award in franchise history, two managers – Buck Rodgers in 1987 and Felipe Alou in 1994 – having won it while the franchise played as the Montreal Expos.

==== Silver Slugger ====
- Ian Desmond, SS
- Anthony Rendon, 3B

During 2014, Ian Desmond became the fourth shortstop in Major League Baseball history to have at least 20 home runs and at least 20 stolen bases in three separate seasons. He won his third consecutive Silver Slugger Award, becoming the first player in Washington Nationals history to win the Silver Slugger Award in three different seasons, exceeding the previous record of two set by third baseman Ryan Zimmermann in 2009 and 2010. He became the fifth Major League Baseball shortstop in win the Silver Slugger in three consecutive seasons, the first to do so since Derek Jeter won four in a row from 2006 to 2009 with the New York Yankees, and the first shortstop in the National League to win three in a row since Barry Larkin won five in a row with the Cincinnati Reds from 1988 through 1992.

Anthony Rendon won the Silver Slugger Award in his first full major league season. In 2014, he tied with Casey McGehee of the Miami Marlins to lead all National League third basemen with a .287 batting average and led the National League with 111 runs scored.

Desmond and Rendon became the first shortstop-third baseman duo to win the Silver Slugger Award in the same season since Alex Rodriguez and Derek Jeter did it with the New York Yankees in 2008.

==== Tony Conigliaro Award ====
- Tony Conigliaro Award: Wilson Ramos

Wilson Ramos received the 2014 Tony Conigliaro Award, which is given for demonstrating spirit, determination, and courage. He received it for his performance in 2014 after overcoming his kidnapping in Venezuela in 2011 and various injuries in the following years. He was the first player in Washington Nationals history and the third player in franchise history (Note: Two players – Curtis Pride outright in 1996 and Graeme Lloyd as a co-winner with Jason Johnson of the Baltimore Orioles in 2001 – won the Tony Conigliaro Award while the franchise played as the Montreal Expos.) to win the award.

== Farm system ==
Level	Team	League	Manager
AAA	Syracuse Chiefs	International League	Billy Gardner Jr.
AA	Harrisburg Senators	Eastern League	Brian Daubach
A	Potomac Nationals	Carolina League	Tripp Keister
A	Hagerstown Suns	South Atlantic League	Patrick Anderson
A-Short Season	Auburn Doubledays	New York–Penn League	Gary Cathcart
Rookie	GCL Nationals	Gulf Coast League	Michael Barrett

LEAGUE CHAMPIONS: Potomac
