= 2014 National League Division Series =

American baseball games

Teams
Team (Wins)		Manager	Season
San Francisco Giants (3)		Bruce Bochy	88–74 (.543), GB: 6
Washington Nationals (1)		Matt Williams	96–66 (.593), GA: 17
- Dates: October 3–7
- Television: FS1 (Games 1–2, 4); MLB Network (Game 3)
- TV announcers: Matt Vasgersian, John Smoltz, Jon Paul Morosi (Games 1–2, 4) and Sam Ryan (Game 3)
- Radio: ESPN
- Radio announcers: Dave O'Brien and John Kruk
- Umpires: Mike Winters (crew chief), Vic Carapazza, Laz Diaz, Tom Hallion, Brian Knight, Hunter Wendelstedt

Teams
Team (Wins)		Manager	Season
St. Louis Cardinals (3)		Mike Matheny	90–72 (.556), GA: 2
Los Angeles Dodgers (1)		Don Mattingly	94–68 (.580), GA: 6
- Dates: October 3–7
- Television: FS1 (Games 1, 3–4); MLB Network (Game 2)
- TV announcers: Joe Buck (Games 1, 3–4), Bob Costas (Game 2), Harold Reynolds, Tom Verducci, Ken Rosenthal, and Erin Andrews (Games 1, 4)
- Radio: ESPN
- Radio announcers: Dan Shulman and Aaron Boone
- Umpires: Dale Scott (crew chief), Eric Cooper, Rob Drake, Jerry Layne, Jerry Meals, Alan Porter
- NLWC: San Francisco Giants defeated Pittsburgh Pirates, 8–0

The 2014 National League Division Series was two best-of-five-game series on the National League side in Major League Baseball's 2014 postseason to determine the participating teams in the 2014 National League Championship Series. The Washington Nationals, Los Angeles Dodgers, and St. Louis Cardinals (seeded 1–3 based on record, respectively) and San Francisco Giants—played in two series. Fox Sports 1 carried most of the games, with two of the games on MLB Network.

These matchups were:

- (1) Washington Nationals (NL East champions) vs. (5) San Francisco Giants (Wild Card Game winner): Giants won the series, 3–1.
- (2) Los Angeles Dodgers (NL West champions) vs. (3) St. Louis Cardinals (NL Central champions): Cardinals won the series, 3–1.

The higher seeded team in each series hosts Games 1, 2, and 5 (if necessary), and the lower seeded team hosts Games 3 and 4 (if necessary).

The Giants would go on to defeat the Cardinals in the NLCS, then win the 2014 World Series, defeating the American League champion Kansas City Royals.

== Matchups ==
=== Washington Nationals vs. San Francisco Giants ===
San Francisco won the series, 3–1.

Game	Date	Score	Location	Time	Attendance
1	October 3	San Francisco Giants – 3, Washington Nationals – 2	Nationals Park	3:55	44,035
2	October 4	San Francisco Giants – 2, Washington Nationals – 1 (18)	Nationals Park	6:23	44,035
3	October 6	Washington Nationals – 4, San Francisco Giants – 1	AT&T Park	2:47	43,627
4	October 7	Washington Nationals – 2, San Francisco Giants – 3	AT&T Park	3:15	43,464

=== Los Angeles Dodgers vs. St. Louis Cardinals ===
St. Louis won the series, 3–1.

Game	Date	Score	Location	Time	Attendance
1	October 3	St. Louis Cardinals – 10, Los Angeles Dodgers – 9	Dodger Stadium	3:57	54,265
2	October 4	St. Louis Cardinals – 2, Los Angeles Dodgers – 3	Dodger Stadium	3:27	54,599
3	October 6	Los Angeles Dodgers – 1, St. Louis Cardinals – 3	Busch Stadium	3:04	47,574
4	October 7	Los Angeles Dodgers – 2, St. Louis Cardinals – 3	Busch Stadium	3:05	46,906

== Washington vs. San Francisco ==
This was the first postseason meeting between the Nationals and Giants.

=== Game 1 ===
October 3, 2014 3:07 p.m. (EDT) at Nationals Park in Washington, D.C. 72 °F (22 °C), overcast
Team	1	2	3	4	5	6	7	8	9	R	H	E
San Francisco	0	0	1	1	0	0	1	0	0	3	12	0
Washington	0	0	0	0	0	0	2	0	0	2	6	0
WP: Jake Peavy (1–0) LP: Stephen Strasburg (0–1) Sv: Santiago Casilla (1); Home runs: SF: None; WSH: Bryce Harper (1), Asdrúbal Cabrera (1); Attendance: 44,035; Boxscore

The Giants opened the series with Jake Peavy on the mound to counter Nationals starter Stephen Strasburg. Joe Panik put the Giants on the board in the third inning with an RBI single and Brandon Belt followed suit in the fourth to support Peavy, who didn't allow a hit until the bottom of the fifth inning. The first signs of trouble for the Giants came in the bottom of the sixth when, after a leadoff double from former Giant Nate Schierholtz and a two-out walk to Jayson Werth, Peavy was taken out of the game. Javier López came into the game only to surrender a walk to Adam LaRoche. With the bases loaded, Hunter Strickland came on to make just his tenth overall Major League appearance and struck out Ian Desmond to end the threat. The Giants added a third run when Panik tripled to lead off the seventh, and Buster Posey singled to knock him in. This run was to prove crucial, as when Strickland came out in the bottom half of the inning, he allowed home runs to both Bryce Harper and Asdrúbal Cabrera to make it a one-run game. Jeremy Affeldt finished off the Nationals in the seventh, and Sergio Romo pitched a scoreless eighth, before Santiago Casilla retired the side in order for the save, as the Giants held on to win by a score of 3–2.

=== Game 2 ===
October 4, 2014 5:37 p.m. (EDT) at Nationals Park in Washington, D.C. 61 °F (16 °C), partly cloudy
Team	1	2	3	4	5	6	7	8	9	10	11	12	13	14	15	16	17	18	R	H	E
San Francisco	0	0	0	0	0	0	0	0	1	0	0	0	0	0	0	0	0	1	2	8	0
Washington	0	0	1	0	0	0	0	0	0	0	0	0	0	0	0	0	0	0	1	9	0
WP: Yusmeiro Petit (1–0) LP: Tanner Roark (0–1) Sv: Hunter Strickland (1); Home runs: SF: Brandon Belt (1); WSH: None; Attendance: 44,035; Boxscore

Game 2 of the Division Series between the Nationals and the Giants lasted a record 18 innings, with the Giants winning 2–1. It was the longest postseason game in Major League Baseball history to date, both by duration (6 hours 23 minutes) and innings played (18), exceeding the previous innings-played mark by 2/3 of a half-inning (Game 4 of the 2005 NLDS ended when the home team scored with one out in the bottom of the 18th inning). Coincidentally, Adam LaRoche of the Nationals and Tim Hudson of the Giants both played in the 2005 game as Atlanta Braves, becoming the only two players to play in both 18 inning games. Game 3 of the 2018 World Series, which lasted 7 hours 20 minutes, has since surpassed this game by duration, although both contests share the 18-inning mark.

Hudson struck out eight Nationals and conceded one run in 7 1/3 innings of work, with the lone run coming in the third when Asdrúbal Cabrera doubled, advanced to third on a groundout, and scored on Anthony Rendon's two out single. However, Hudson was bettered by Nationals starter Jordan Zimmermann who came an out shy of recording a three-hit shutout, just six days after throwing a no-hitter on the last day of the regular season. Zimmermann retired 20 Giants in a row before walking Joe Panik with two outs in the ninth and being removed from the game. The Giants continued to rally in the ninth when Buster Posey singled on the first pitch from closer Drew Storen, and Pablo Sandoval drove in Panik with a double. Posey was thrown out at home plate on the same play, and manager Bruce Bochy called for a video review but it was unsuccessful and it ended the inning. Sergio Romo retired the side in the bottom half and the game went to extra innings, tied 1–1. In the 10th inning, Nationals second baseman Asdrubal Cabrera and manager Matt Williams were ejected for arguing balls and strikes. Entering the game in the 12th inning, Giants pitcher Yusmeiro Petit became just the seventh pitcher to throw six or more shutout innings of relief in a playoff game, as neither team could break the deadlock. Brandon Belt finally broke the tie, launching a home run into the second deck in right field to lead off the 18th inning off of Tanner Roark. As the clock struck midnight, Hunter Strickland finished off the game to earn the save and a 2–0 series advantage for the Giants. The win marked the tenth consecutive postseason victory for the Giants, a streak extending back to the 2012 National League Championship Series. By allowing one run in the third and subsequently never allowing another one for the rest of the game, the Giants' pitching staff combined for a new postseason record 15 consecutive scoreless innings in a single game, breaking Babe Ruth's 13 scoreless innings in Game 2 of the 1916 World Series against the Brooklyn Dodgers. This record would be broken by Game 3 of the 2022 American League Division Series between the Astros and Mariners, with the Astros pitching an 18-inning shutout, which also featured a leadoff home run in the top of the 18th as the go-ahead play.

=== Game 3 ===
October 6, 2014 5:07 p.m. (EDT) at AT&T Park in San Francisco, California 78 °F (26 °C), mostly clear
Team	1	2	3	4	5	6	7	8	9	R	H	E
Washington	0	0	0	0	0	0	3	0	1	4	7	0
San Francisco	0	0	0	0	0	0	0	0	1	1	6	1
WP: Doug Fister (1–0) LP: Madison Bumgarner (0–1); Home runs: WSH: Bryce Harper (2); SF: None; Attendance: 43,627; Boxscore

Hoping to avoid a sweep, the Nationals sent Doug Fister to the mound in Game 3. Opposing him was Madison Bumgarner who had thrown a complete-game shutout in the NL Wild Card game. Both pitchers threw six scoreless innings, but in the top of the seventh, Ian Desmond and Bryce Harper opened up the inning with back-to-back singles. Wilson Ramos attempted to bunt the runners over, but Bumgarner's throw to get the force out at third went past Pablo Sandoval and down the left field line, allowing both Desmond and Harper to score, with Ramos ending up at second on the error. Asdrúbal Cabrera singled in Ramos and the Nationals had a 3–0 lead. The score remained 3–0 until the ninth when Harper led off the inning with a home run to stretch the lead to 4–0. Drew Storen came on in the bottom half and allowed a single to Sandoval and a double to Hunter Pence to open the inning. Brandon Belt struck out looking for the first out. Brandon Crawford hit a sacrifice fly to score Sandoval and cut the lead to 4–1, but Storen got Travis Ishikawa to ground out for the final out of the game as the Nationals avoided a sweep. As it turned out, this would be the only loss Bumgarner would have the entire postseason.

=== Game 4 ===
October 7, 2014 9:07 p.m. (EDT) at AT&T Park in San Francisco, California 64 °F (18 °C), partly cloudy
Team	1	2	3	4	5	6	7	8	9	R	H	E
Washington	0	0	0	0	1	0	1	0	0	2	4	1
San Francisco	0	2	0	0	0	0	1	0	X	3	8	0
WP: Hunter Strickland (1–0) LP: Matt Thornton (0–1) Sv: Santiago Casilla (2); Home runs: WSH: Bryce Harper (3); SF: None; Attendance: 43,464; Boxscore

Ryan Vogelsong and Gio González were the starters for Game 4, with the Nationals needing a victory to send the series back to the nation's capital. The Giants struck first with two runs in the bottom of the second off Gio González. After Brandon Crawford singled and Juan Pérez reached on an error, Vogelsong reached first safely on a well-placed bunt to load the bases with one out. Gregor Blanco walked and Joe Panik hit an RBI groundout to give the Giants a 2–0 lead. Vogelsong held the Nationals hitless until the fifth inning, when Ian Desmond singled and Bryce Harper doubled him home to cut the Giants' lead to 2–1. The Giants threatened against Nationals reliever Tanner Roark in the bottom of the fifth by loading the bases, but manager Matt Williams summoned Jerry Blevins to face Brandon Belt, whom he struck out to end the threat.

Bryce Harper tied up the game in the top of the seventh inning with a towering home run off Hunter Strickland into McCovey Cove, Harper's third home run of the series and second off of Strickland. Harper also became the third player in postseason history to hit the Cove after Barry Bonds and Rick Ankiel. Left-hander Matt Thornton started the bottom of the seventh inning by getting the first out but allowed singles to Joe Panik and Buster Posey. He was replaced by Aaron Barrett, who walked Hunter Pence to load the bases. Facing Pablo Sandoval, Barrett threw a wild pitch which allowed Panik to score what would prove to be the game-winning run. The Nationals then proceeded to attempt to intentional walk Sandoval, but Barrett's threw another wild pitch. However, this time Posey was thrown out at the plate trying to score, with replay confirming it. Sergio Romo pitched a perfect eighth, and Santiago Casilla followed with a scoreless ninth. After issuing a two-out walk to Bryce Harper, Casilla retired Wilson Ramos on a groundout to eliminate the Nationals and send the Giants to their third NLCS in five years. According to Elias Sports Bureau, this was the fourth time in MLB postseason history that the winning run in a series-clinching game scored on a wild pitch in the seventh inning or later, after the 1927 Yankees (9th inning), 1972 Reds (9th inning), and 2004 Yankees (11th inning).

=== Composite line score ===
2014 NLDS (3–1): San Francisco Giants over Washington Nationals

Team	1	2	3	4	5	6	7	8	9	10	11	12	13	14	15	16	17	18	R	H	E
San Francisco Giants	0	2	1	1	0	0	2	0	2	0	0	0	0	0	0	0	0	1	9	34	1
Washington Nationals	0	0	1	0	1	0	6	0	1	0	0	0	0	0	0	0	0	0	9	26	1
Total attendance: 175,161 Average attendance: 43,790

== Los Angeles vs. St. Louis ==
The Dodgers and Cardinals met in the postseason for the fifth time, with the Cardinals having won three of the first four matchups, including the previous year's NLCS which the Cardinals won 4 games to 2.

=== Game 1 ===
October 3, 2014 6:37 p.m. (EDT) at Dodger Stadium in Los Angeles 84 °F (29 °C), partly cloudy
Team	1	2	3	4	5	6	7	8	9	R	H	E
St. Louis	1	0	0	0	0	1	8	0	0	10	10	0
Los Angeles	0	0	2	2	2	0	0	2	1	9	16	0
WP: Marco Gonzales (1–0) LP: Clayton Kershaw (0–1) Sv: Trevor Rosenthal (1); Home runs: STL: Randal Grichuk (1), Matt Carpenter (1), Matt Holliday (1); LAD: A.J. Ellis (1), Adrián González (1); Attendance: 54,265; Boxscore

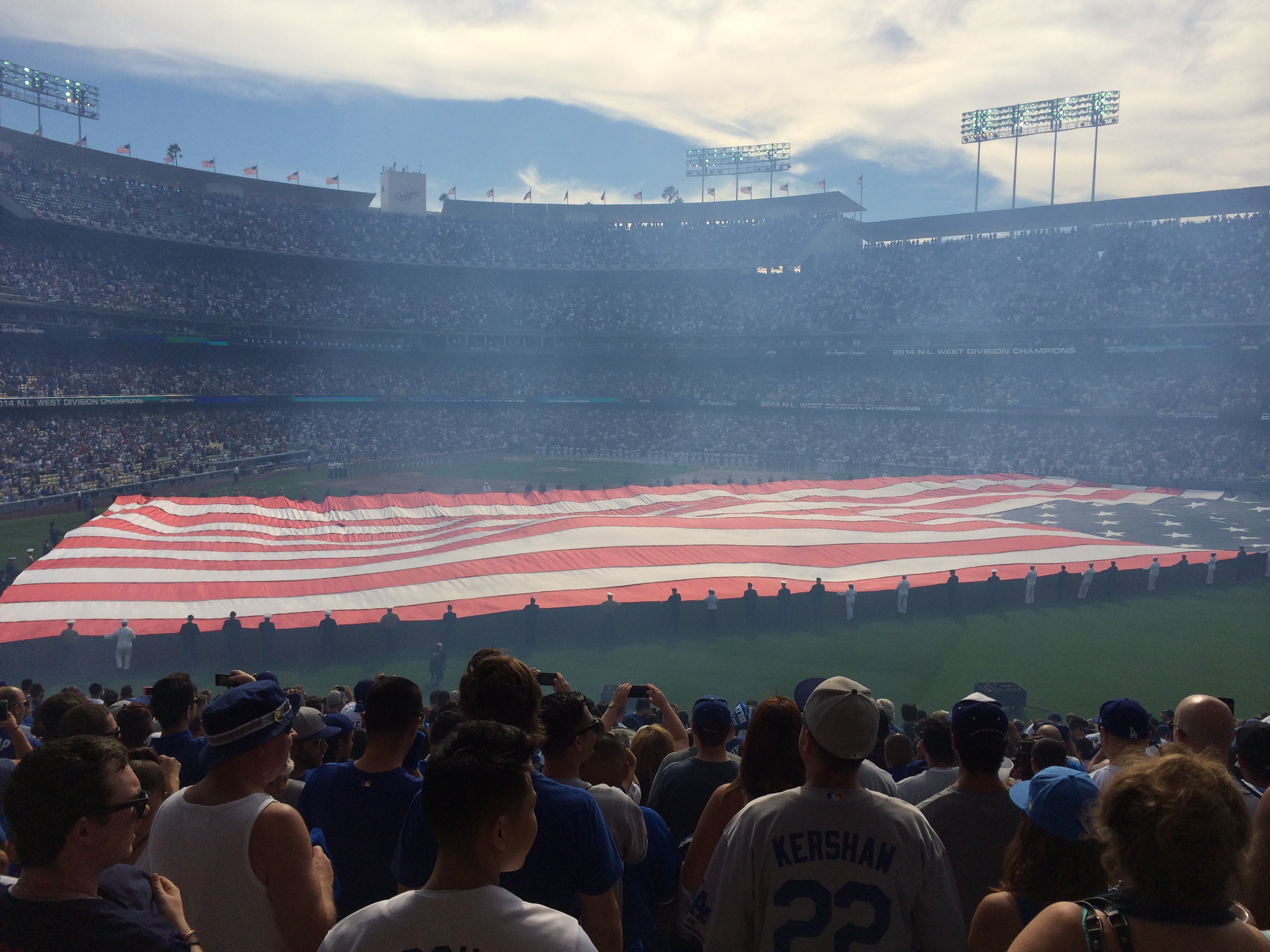
Game 1 of the 2014 NLDS

This game was hailed as the first post-season matchup of 20 game winners (the Dodgers' Clayton Kershaw and the Cardinals' Adam Wainwright) since Curt Schilling faced Roger Clemens in Game seven of the 2001 World Series. However, neither pitcher was his usual self. The Cardinals jumped out to a quick lead on a homer by Randal Grichuk in the top of the first. The Dodgers went ahead in the third when Yasiel Puig was hit by a pitch, moved to second on a groundout and scored on a single by Hanley Ramírez, who was then doubled in by Carl Crawford. They got two more the next inning on RBI singles by Puig and Matt Kemp and then made it 6–1 with a two-run home run by A. J. Ellis (who was 4–for–5 in the game) in the fifth to chase Wainwright from the game. Kershaw did not allow another hit after the first inning home run until Matt Carpenter hit a home run in the sixth. He started to unravel in the seventh, allowing four straight singles to start the inning and score a run. A strikeout of Pete Kozma was the first out and a Jon Jay RBI single cut the lead to two runs. Carpenter's three-run double put the Cardinals ahead 7-6 and chased Kershaw. Reliever Pedro Báez came on in relief, walking Grichuk and then allowed a three-run homer to Matt Holliday to put the Cardinals ahead by four runs. This tied the record of most runs scored in an inning in a Division series, eight, which the Baltimore Orioles accomplished just a day earlier in their ALDS matchup with the Detroit Tigers. Kershaw (who also struggled in game six of the 2013 NLCS) became the first pitcher in history to allow at least seven runs in consecutive post-season starts, and also the first pitcher in history to allow eight runs in a post-season game while also striking out ten. The Dodgers got a two-run homer by Adrián González in the eighth off of Randy Choate and also added one more in the ninth off of Trevor Rosenthal on Dee Gordon's RBI groundout with two on, but it was not enough as they lost the opener 10–9.

=== Game 2 ===
October 4, 2014 9:37 p.m. (EDT) at Dodger Stadium in Los Angeles 75 °F (24 °C), partly cloudy
Team	1	2	3	4	5	6	7	8	9	R	H	E
St. Louis	0	0	0	0	0	0	0	2	0	2	5	1
Los Angeles	0	0	2	0	0	0	0	1	X	3	8	0
WP: Brandon League (1–0) LP: Pat Neshek (0–1) Sv: Kenley Jansen (1); Home runs: STL: Matt Carpenter (2); LAD: Matt Kemp (1); Attendance: 54,599; Boxscore

In Game two, Zack Greinke struck out seven while allowing no runs and two hits in seven innings. The Dodgers pushed ahead two runs off Lance Lynn in the third on Dee Gordon's groundout after a leadoff double and single and Adrián González's RBI single. However, Matt Carpenter again was the key player for the Cardinals, as he hit a two-run homer off J. P. Howell in the top of the eighth to even up the game. Matt Kemp hit a homer in the bottom of the inning off of Pat Neshek to put the Dodgers back ahead and Kenley Jansen shut the door in the ninth to even up the series.

=== Game 3 ===
October 6, 2014 9:07 p.m. (EDT) at Busch Stadium in St. Louis, Missouri 64 °F (18 °C), overcast
Team	1	2	3	4	5	6	7	8	9	R	H	E
Los Angeles	0	0	0	0	0	1	0	0	0	1	7	0
St. Louis	0	0	1	0	0	0	2	0	X	3	11	0
WP: John Lackey (1–0) LP: Scott Elbert (0–1) Sv: Trevor Rosenthal (2); Home runs: LAD: None; STL: Matt Carpenter (3), Kolten Wong (1); Attendance: 47,574; Boxscore

Hyun-jin Ryu made the start for the Dodgers at Busch Stadium in Game 3, his first appearance since leaving a game against the Giants with an injury on September 12. He pitched well, allowing only one run (on another Matt Carpenter home run in the third) and four hits in six innings. However, the Dodgers were also only able to push across one run against Cardinals starter John Lackey when Yasiel Puig tripled to lead off the sixth and scored on Hanley Ramirez's two out double to tie the game. For the third straight game, the Dodgers bullpen faltered. This time it was Scott Elbert who allowed a two-run homer to Kolten Wong in the seventh, the difference maker in the 3–1 Cardinals win.

=== Game 4 ===
October 7, 2014 5:07 p.m. (EDT) at Busch Stadium in St. Louis, Missouri 77 °F (25 °C), partly cloudy
Team	1	2	3	4	5	6	7	8	9	R	H	E
Los Angeles	0	0	0	0	0	2	0	0	0	2	8	0
St. Louis	0	0	0	0	0	0	3	0	X	3	4	0
WP: Marco Gonzales (2–0) LP: Clayton Kershaw (0–2) Sv: Trevor Rosenthal (3); Home runs: LAD: None; STL: Matt Adams (1); Attendance: 46,906; Boxscore

In Game Four, Clayton Kershaw started on three days' rest and pitched a one-hit shutout through the first six innings. The Dodgers struck first in the sixth off of Shelby Miller after back-to-back leadoff singles was followed by a Matt Kemp ground-ball double-play. After a hit-by-pitch and walk, Seth Maness relieved Miller and allowed an RBI single to Juan Uribe to put the Dodgers up 2–0, but in a repeat of the first game, it fell apart for the Dodgers in the seventh. Matt Holliday and Jhonny Peralta each hit infield singles to lead off the inning. Matt Adams hit a three-run homer that was the decisive blow, the first time a left-handed hitter had ever hit Kershaw's curveball for a home run. The Dodgers attempted to rally in the ninth inning with runners on first and second but Carl Crawford grounded into a fielders' choice to end the game. The Cardinals won 3–2 and eliminated the Dodgers in the post-season for the second straight year.

=== Composite line score ===
2014 NLDS (3–1): St. Louis Cardinals over Los Angeles Dodgers

Team	1	2	3	4	5	6	7	8	9	R	H	E
St. Louis Cardinals	1	0	1	0	0	1	13	2	0	18	30	1
Los Angeles Dodgers	0	0	4	2	2	3	0	3	1	15	39	0
Total attendance: 203,344 Average attendance: 50,836

== See also ==
- 2014 American League Division Series
