= Matt Williams (third baseman) =

American baseball player, manager, and coach (born 1965)

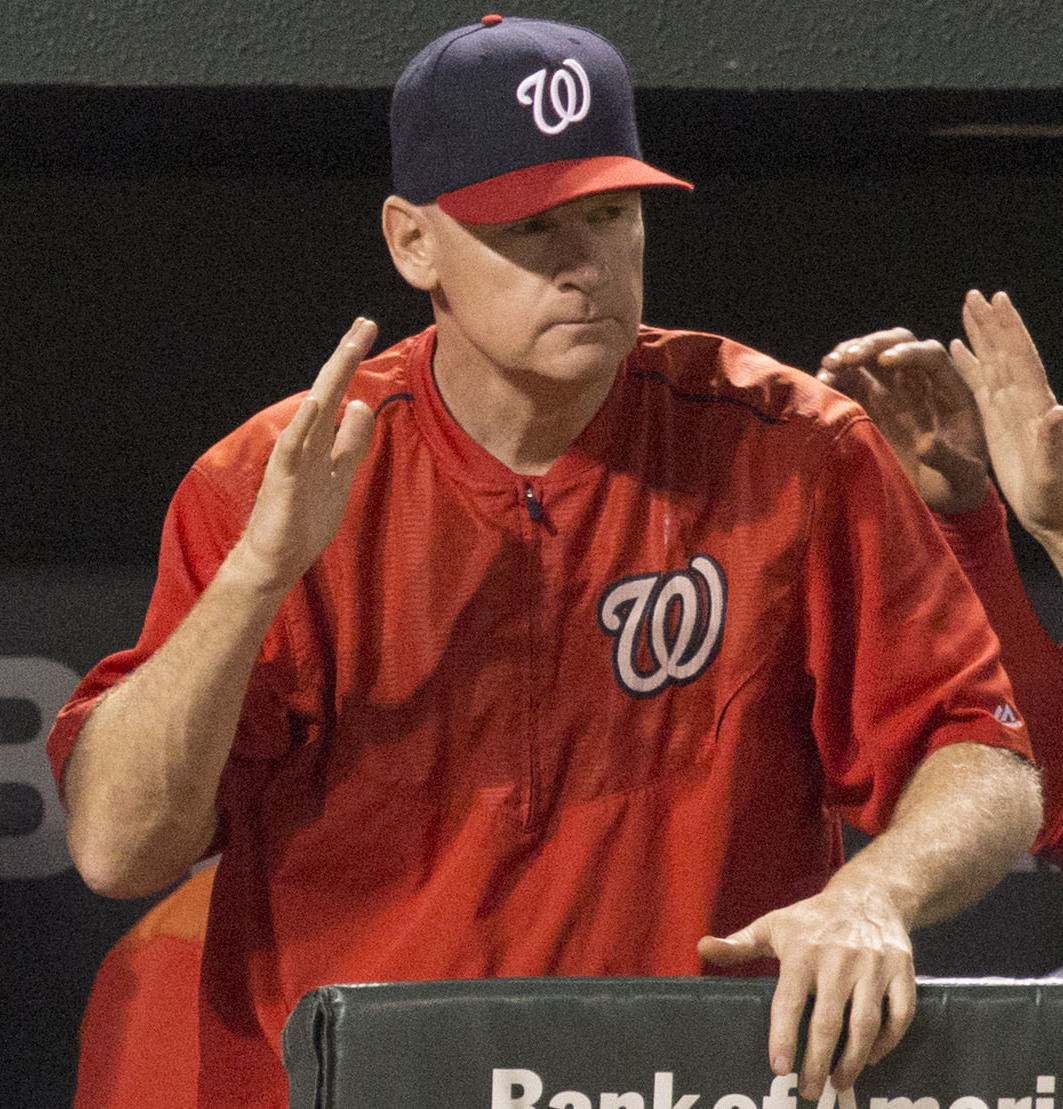
- Williams with the Washington Nationals in 2015

San Francisco Firebells
- Third baseman / Manager
- Born: November 28, 1965 (age 60); Bishop, California, U.S.
- Batted: Right Threw: Right

MLB debut
- April 11, 1987, for the San Francisco Giants

Last MLB appearance
- May 31, 2003, for the Arizona Diamondbacks

MLB statistics
- Batting average: .268
- Home runs: 378
- Runs batted in: 1,218
- Managerial record: 179–145
- Winning %: .552
- Stats at Baseball Reference

Teams
- As player: San Francisco Giants (1987–1996); Cleveland Indians (1997); Arizona Diamondbacks (1998–2003); As manager: Washington Nationals (2014–2015); Kia Tigers (2020–2021); As coach: Arizona Diamondbacks (2010–2013, 2016); Oakland Athletics (2018–2019); San Diego Padres (2022–2023); San Francisco Giants (2024–2025)

Career highlights and awards
- 5× All-Star (1990, 1994–1996, 1999); World Series champion (2001); 4× Gold Glove Award (1991, 1993, 1994, 1997); 4× Silver Slugger Award (1990, 1993, 1994, 1997); NL home run leader (1994); NL RBI leader (1990); NL Manager of the Year (2014); San Francisco Giants Wall of Fame

Matthew Derrick Williams (born November 28, 1965), nicknamed "Matt the Bat" and "the Big Marine", is an American professional baseball manager and former third baseman. A right-handed batter, Williams played in Major League Baseball (MLB) for the San Francisco Giants, Cleveland Indians, and Arizona Diamondbacks. He managed the Washington Nationals from 2014 to 2015, and was the third base coach for the San Diego Padres from 2022 to 2023 and the San Francisco Giants from 2024 to 2025.

Williams is currently the manager of the San Francisco Firebells of the WPBL (Women's Professional Baseball League), a position he has held since 2026.

Williams played in a World Series for each of the teams he played for (1989 with the Giants, 1997 with the Indians, and 2001 with the Diamondbacks in which he won over the New York Yankees). During these years, Williams became the only player to hit at least one World Series home run for three different Major League baseball teams. During his career, Williams had an overall batting average of .268, with 378 home runs and 1,218 runs batted in (RBI). He scored 997 Major League runs, and he accumulated 1,878 hits, 338 doubles, and 35 triples, while playing in 1,866 regular-season games.

== Early life ==
Williams originally was selected by the New York Mets in the 27th round (664th overall) of the 1983 Major League Baseball draft from Carson High School in Carson City, Nevada, but he did not sign with the Mets. Williams was the starting quarterback on the Carson Senators football team in high school. Two of his teammates who played baseball in high school, Bob Ayrault and Charlie Kerfeld, also played baseball in the major leagues. During his senior year, Williams was named Nevada's high school player of the year.

== College career ==
Williams accepted a scholarship to play college baseball for the University of Nevada, Las Vegas.

Williams played for the UNLV Rebels for three seasons between 1984 and 1986. In that time, he hit 58 home runs, tallied 217 RBI and had a batting average of .327. He was inducted into the school's athletics hall of fame in 1997.

== Professional career ==
=== Draft and minor leagues ===
Williams was drafted by the San Francisco Giants in the first round (third overall) of the 1986 Major League Baseball draft. He made his professional debut that season, batting .240 with 14 doubles, four triples, eight home runs and 39 RBI in 72 games with the Low-A Everett Giants and Single-A Clinton Giants.

=== San Francisco Giants (1987–1996) ===
Williams was called to the majors for the first time on April 11, 1987, serving as an injury replacement for José Uribe. That day, he appeared in his first MLB game, going 1-for-3 in a 5–1 loss to the Los Angeles Dodgers. Williams' first major league hit was an eighth-inning single off Dodgers pitcher Orel Hershiser. He finished the season batting .188 with eight home runs and 21 RBI in 84 games. In the field, he primarily played shortstop while also playing some games at third base.

Prior to the 1989 season, Williams was named as the starting third baseman for the Giants. However, he struggled to begin the season with a .130 batting average, and was optioned to the Triple-A Phoenix Firebirds after the Giants' game on May 1. Williams considered this demotion as a turning point in his career, as he batted .320 with 26 home runs and 61 RBI in 76 games before returning to San Francisco in July. In 84 games with the Giants, Williams hit .202, but managed to record 18 home runs and 50 RBI.

Williams enjoyed a breakout season in 1990, finishing with a .277 average, 33 home runs and a National League-leading 122 RBI en route to making the National League All-Star team.

Despite suffering from several leg injuries and some lower-back ailments, Williams was an excellent fielder at third base, and a dangerous and productive hitter. As a third baseman, Williams had good reflexes and excellent hands, with a quick release and strong, accurate arm. During his career, he earned four Gold Glove Awards, all between 1991 and 1997.

A hitter with exceptional power, Williams hit at least 30 home runs and recorded at least 90 RBI in four of his seasons with the Giants. His best season was 1994 when he hit a National League-best 43 home runs and had 96 RBI in only 112 games as the Major League Baseball season was shortened by nearly one-third because of a season-ending strike by Major League baseball players. He was on pace to challenge the single season home run record of 61, at the time held by Roger Maris, with his 43 home runs in 115 games, projecting to 60.6 home runs at season's end. Williams finished second in the voting for the National League Most Valuable Player Award that year behind first baseman Jeff Bagwell of the Houston Astros.

=== Cleveland Indians (1997) ===
On November 13, 1996, Williams was traded to the Cleveland Indians along with a player to be named later (Trenidad Hubbard) in exchange for future NL MVP Jeff Kent, Julián Tavárez, José Vizcaíno and another player to be named later (Joe Roa).

In 1997, while Williams' streak of three straight All-Star selections ended, he still managed to hit .263 with 32 home runs and 105 RBI in 151 games. He also won a Gold Glove and Silver Slugger Award for the first time since 1994. In the 1997 postseason, Williams hit .288 with three doubles, two home runs, 8 RBI and 13 walks, helping lead Cleveland to its second American League pennant in three years. The Indians ultimately lost the World Series in seven games to the Florida Marlins.

=== Arizona Diamondbacks (1998–2003) ===
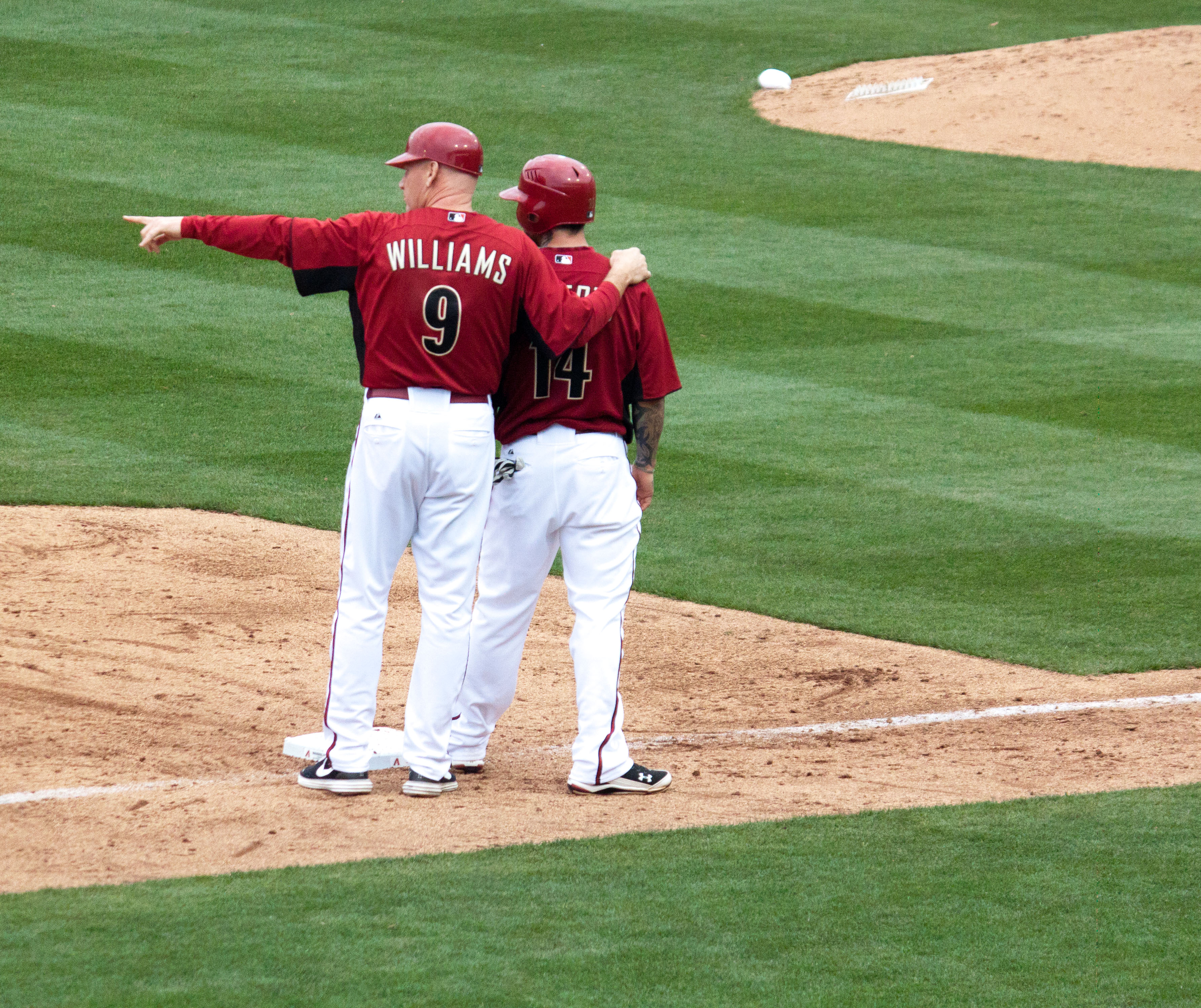
Williams (left) as third base coach with the Diamondbacks in 2011

After his divorce from his first wife Tracie, Williams requested and was granted a trade to the Arizona Diamondbacks to be closer to his children. The trade sent Williams to Arizona in exchange for Travis Fryman, Tom Martin and cash considerations. Williams signed a five-year, $45 million extension with the Diamondbacks after the acquisition was completed. He was a member of the first Diamondbacks team during the club's inaugural season in 1998. He shares the Diamondbacks record for the most RBI in one season with a total of 142 during 1999; the record was tied by Luis Gonzalez in 2001, but has never been exceeded.

Williams was a partial owner of the Diamondbacks, and carried the title of "Special Assistant to the General Partner". Williams occasionally also served as color commentator during Diamondbacks radio and television broadcasts, and also assisted in coaching and with player personnel matters.

== Managerial career ==
=== Washington Nationals (2014–2015) ===
On October 31, 2013, the Washington Nationals announced that they had hired Williams to replace Davey Johnson as their manager for the 2014 season. Prior to the 2015 season, the Nationals exercised an option to extend Williams through the 2016 season. Williams managed the Nationals to a 96–66 record and an NL East division title in his first season, but the team lost the NLDS to the San Francisco Giants. Williams was named the 2014 National League Manager of the Year.

On October 5, 2015, the Nationals fired Williams after a disappointing season where they were World Series favorites and failed to make the postseason. He finished with a record of 179 wins and 145 losses.

=== Kia Tigers (2020–2021) ===
Williams joined the Kia Tigers of the KBO League, becoming their first American-born manager before the 2020 season. On November 5, 2021, it was announced that Williams would not be returning to the team in 2022 after the club finished in ninth place with a 58–75 record in 2021.

=== San Francisco Firebells (2026) ===
The Women's Pro Baseball League named Williams as manager of the San Francisco Firebells in the inaugural 2026 season.

=== Managerial record ===
As of 2015 season

Team	Year	Regular season					Postseason			
Team	Year	Games	Won	Lost	Win %	Finish	Won	Lost	Win %	Result
WAS	2014	162	96	66	.593	1st in NL East	1	3	.250	Lost NLDS (SF)
WAS	2015	162	83	79	.512	2nd in NL East	–	–	–	–
Total		324	179	145	.552		1	3	.250	

== Coaching career ==
On November 11, 2009, Williams was hired by the Arizona Diamondbacks to be the first base coach for 2010. Williams moved from first base coach to third base coach for the 2011 season, while working under first-year manager Kirk Gibson. Williams coached for the Diamondbacks from 2010 through 2013, and again in 2016 when he was fired from the Nationals.

Williams was hired as the Oakland Athletics' third base coach in November 2017, staying with them through the 2019 season.

On December 17, 2021, Williams was hired by the San Diego Padres to serve as the team's third base coach for the 2022 season.

Following the hiring of Bob Melvin as the manager of the San Francisco Giants and his departure from the Padres, on November 10, 2023, it was announced that Williams would be replacing Mark Hallberg as third base coach for the Giants for the 2024 season. On September 29, 2025, following the dismissal of Melvin as manager of the Giants, Williams told reporters that he would also not be returning to the team for the 2026 season.

== Other work ==
Williams joined NBC Sports Bay Area in 2017 as a studio analyst, appearing before and after San Francisco Giants telecasts.

== Steroid use ==
On November 6, 2007, the San Francisco Chronicle reported that Williams purchased $11,600 worth of human growth hormone (HGH), steroids and other drugs from a Palm Beach clinic in 2002. Williams later told the Chronicle he used HGH on the advice of a doctor to treat an ankle injury he suffered during spring training in 2002.

On December 13, 2007, he was named among the dozens of players alleged to have used steroids in the Mitchell Report, commissioned by Major League Baseball and written by former Senator George J. Mitchell.

== Accomplishments ==
Championships
Title	Times	Dates
National League champion	2	1989, 2001
American League champion	1	1997
World Series champion	1	2001

Awards received
Name of award	Times	Dates
Bay Area Sports Hall of Fame	N/A	2017
MLB All-Star	5	1990, 1994, 1995, 1996, 1999
MLB Player of the Month	2	May 1995, April 1999
MLB Player of the Week	4	Jun. 16, 1990; Jul. 30, 1994; Apr. 24, 1999; Jun. 26, 1999
National League Manager of the Year	1	2014
Rawlings Gold Glove Award at third base	4	1991, 1993, 1994 1997
San Francisco Giants Wall of Fame	N/A	2008
Silver Slugger Award at third base	4	1990, 1993, 1994, 1997
Southern Nevada Sports Hall of Fame	N/A	2005
UNLV Athletics Hall of Fame	N/A	1997

National League statistical leader
Category	Times	Seasons
National League home run leader	1	1994
National League RBI leader	1	1990

== Hall of Fame candidacy ==
Williams became eligible for the National Baseball Hall of Fame in 2009. He received just 1.3% of the votes, and was dropped from the ballot.

== Personal life ==
Williams has been married three times. He and his first wife, Tracie, had three children. He was selected for the 1989 Triple-A All-Star Game but withdrew from the contest in order to get married. He married his second wife, film actress Michelle Johnson, in 1999. They divorced in 2002, and did not have children together. In 2003, Williams married Phoenix news anchor Erika Monroe. In 2007 the couple co-hosted the weekend pre-game shows for the Arizona Diamondbacks called "DBacks on Deck".

In March 2023, Williams took a leave of absence from the Padres organization after he underwent surgery following a diagnosis of colon cancer.

In September 2023, Erika Monroe filed for divorce from Williams, citing irreconcilable differences. They share one child, an adult daughter.

Williams is the grandson of former major league outfielder Bert Griffith.

== See also ==
- List of Major League Baseball career home run leaders
- List of Major League Baseball career runs batted in leaders
- List of Major League Baseball annual runs batted in leaders
- List of Major League Baseball annual home run leaders
- List of Major League Baseball players named in the Mitchell Report

Sporting positions
Preceded by Jeff Bagwell; Mark McGwire	National League Player of the Month; May 1995; April 1999	Succeeded by Jeff Conine; Sammy Sosa
Preceded by Lorenzo Bundy	Arizona Diamondbacks first base coach 2010	Succeeded by Eric Young
Preceded by Lorenzo Bundy; Andy Green	Arizona Diamondbacks third base coach 2011–2013; 2016	Succeeded by Eric Young; Tony Perezchica
Preceded by Chip Hale	Oakland Athletics third base coach 2018–2019	Succeeded by Al Pedrique
