= Taylor Hill (baseball) =

American baseball player (born 1989)

- Relief pitcher
- Born: March 12, 1989 (age 36); Old Hickory, Tennessee
- Batted: Right Threw: Right

MLB debut
- June 25, 2014, for the Washington Nationals

Last MLB appearance
- June 15, 2015, for the Washington Nationals

MLB statistics
- Win–loss record: 0–1
- Earned run average: 6.00
- Strikeouts: 14
- Stats at Baseball Reference

Teams
- Washington Nationals (2014–2015)

David Taylor Hill (born March 12, 1989) is an American former professional baseball pitcher. He played in Major League Baseball (MLB) for the Washington Nationals. In 2020, Hill joined the Toronto Blue Jays organization as a coach.

== Playing career ==
=== Amateur ===
A native of Nashville, Tennessee, Hill attended Mount Juliet High School and played college baseball at Vanderbilt University. In 2009, he played collegiate summer baseball with the Chatham Anglers of the Cape Cod Baseball League. He was drafted by the Cleveland Indians in the 30th round of the 2010 MLB draft, but did not sign and returned to Vanderbilt for his senior season.

=== Washington Nationals ===
Hill was drafted by the Washington Nationals in the 6th round, with the 187th overall selection, of the 2011 Major League Baseball draft. Hill was called up to the majors for the first time on June 25, 2014.

On January 6, 2016, Hill was designated for assignment by the Nationals. He cleared waivers and was sent outright to the Triple–A Syracuse Chiefs on January 14.

Hill split the 2017 season between the Double–A Harrisburg Senators and Triple–A Syracuse. In 27 games (26 starts) between the two affiliates, he registered a 7–11 record and 5.92 ERA with 73 strikeouts across 153 2/3 innings pitched. Hill elected free agency following the season on November 6, 2017.

On January 13, 2018, Hill re–signed with Washington on a minor league contract, but was released prior to the season on March 28.

=== San Francisco Giants ===
On May 27, 2018, Hill signed a minor league contract with the San Francisco Giants. He made 20 appearances split between the Double–A Richmond Flying Squirrels and Triple–A Sacramento River Cats, accumulating a 1–11 record and 6.16 ERA with 51 strikeouts across 76 innings of work. Hill elected free agency following the season on November 2.

=== Sioux Falls Canaries ===
On March 6, 2019, Hill signed with the Sioux Falls Canaries of the American Association. In 12 starts 75 innings he went 6-3 with a 2.52 ERA with 58 strikeouts and throwing 1 complete game.

=== Generales de Durango ===
On July 27, 2019, Hill's contract was purchased by the Generales de Durango of the Mexican League. Hill was released by the Generales on January 30, 2020. In 6 starts 27.1 innings he struggled horribly going 2-3 with a 8.89 ERA with 21 strikeouts.

== Coaching career ==
In January 2020, Hill joined the Toronto Blue Jays organization as the development coach for the Advanced-A Dunedin Blue Jays.
