= Tanner Roark =

American baseball pitcher (born 1986)

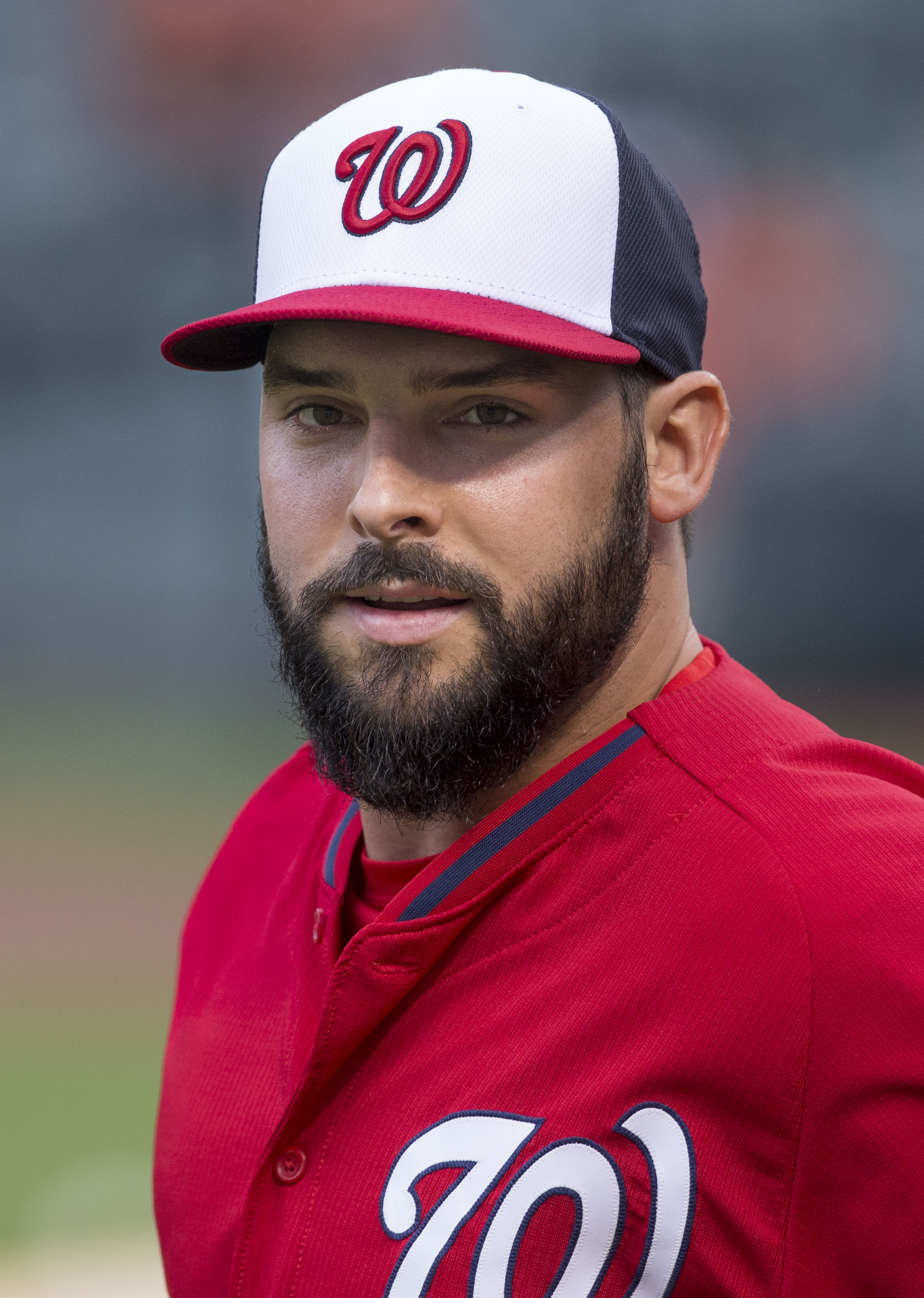
- Roark with the Washington Nationals in 2014
- Pitcher
- Born: October 5, 1986 (age 40); Wilmington, Illinois, U.S.
- Batted: Right Threw: Right

MLB debut
- August 7, 2013, for the Washington Nationals

Last MLB appearance
- April 18, 2021, for the Toronto Blue Jays

Career statistics
- Win–loss record: 76–68
- Earned run average: 3.85
- Strikeouts: 936
- Stats at Baseball Reference

Teams
- Washington Nationals (2013–2018); Cincinnati Reds (2019); Oakland Athletics (2019); Toronto Blue Jays (2020–2021)
Medals
Men's baseball
Representing United States
World Baseball Classic
Gold medal – first place	2017 Los Angeles	Team

Tanner Burnell Roark (/roʊˈɑːrk/ roh-ARK; born October 5, 1986) is an American former professional baseball pitcher. He played in Major League Baseball for the Washington Nationals, Cincinnati Reds, Oakland Athletics, and Toronto Blue Jays. He played college baseball at the University of Illinois at Urbana-Champaign.

== Professional career ==
=== Southern Illinois Miners ===
Roark played one season with the Southern Illinois Miners of the independent Frontier League in 2008. In 3 games, he was 0–2 with a 21.41 ERA. In just 9.2 innings, he gave up 23 hits along with 25 runs while striking out 11.

=== Texas Rangers ===
Roark was drafted by the Texas Rangers in the 25th round of the 2008 MLB draft. He began his professional career with the rookie ball AZL Rangers, and also appeared with the Single-A Bakersfield Blaze. In 2009, Roark split the year between Bakersfield and the Double-A Frisco RoughRiders, pitching to a cumulative 11-1 record and 3.02 ERA with 100 strikeouts. He was assigned to Frisco to begin the 2010 season.

=== Washington Nationals ===
On July 31, 2010, he was traded, along with Ryan Tatusko, to the Washington Nationals in exchange for Cristian Guzmán.

In 2011, he was promoted to the Triple-A Syracuse Chiefs, and posted, in 28 games (26 starts) an unremarkable 6–17 record, but he posted a 4.39 ERA with 7.9 strikeouts and 2.9 walks per nine innings. He began the 2012 season in Syracuse as a starter, then joined the bullpen for 20 relief appearances. Roark moved back to the rotation and had the best stretch of his career, allowing only 12 earned runs over 48 2/3 innings in eight starts.

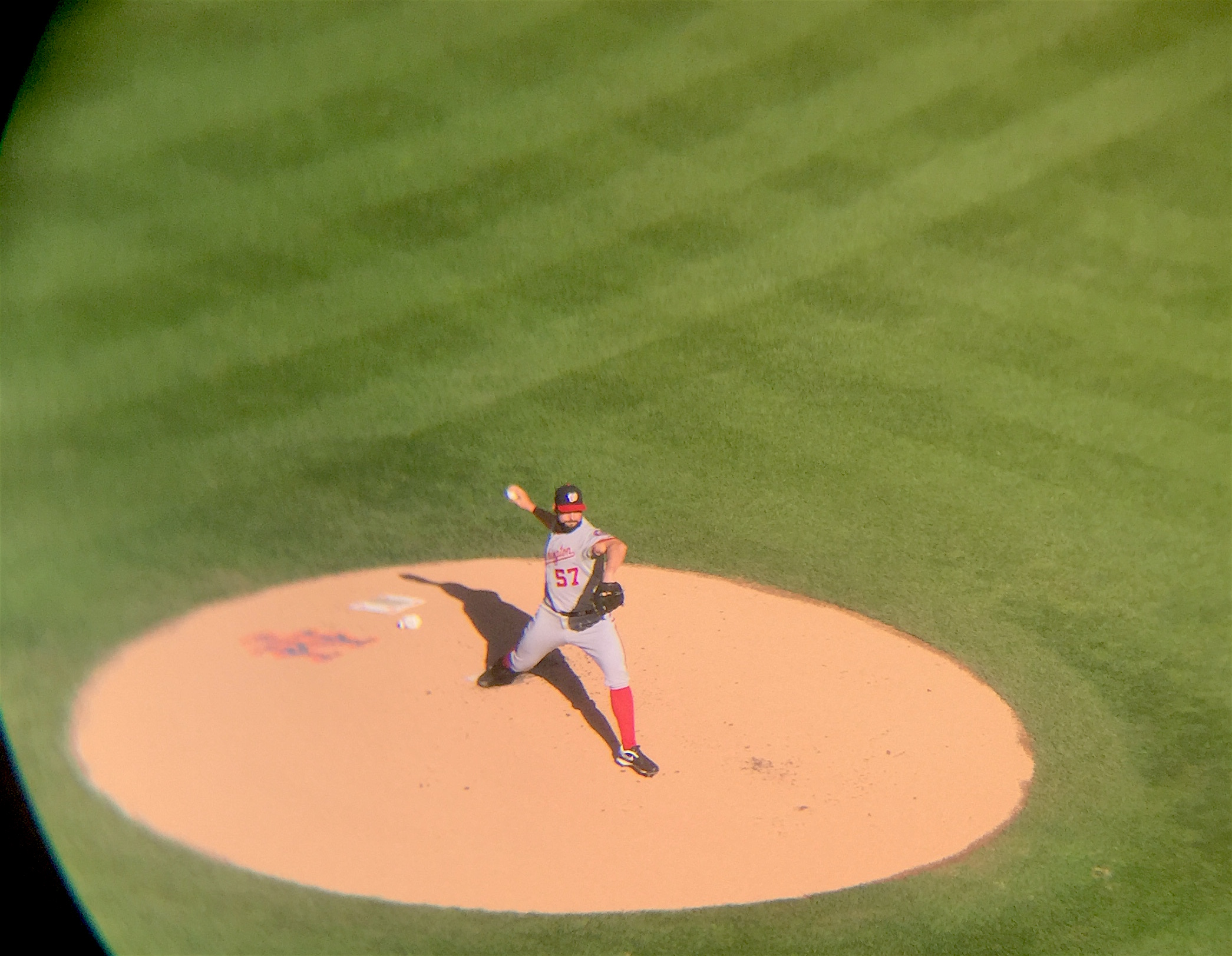
Roark pitching at Citi Field against the New York Mets in 2015

On August 6, 2013, Roark was called up to the MLB for the first time, and on the next day pitched two innings of scoreless relief, allowing only one hit. By the end of August he had appeared in nine games in relief, allowing earned runs only twice, and compiling an ERA of 1.19 over 22 2/3 innings. On September 7, Roark made his first major league start against the Miami Marlins, pitching six innings, allowing no runs and four hits, no walks, and four strikeouts, getting the win. Roark's dominance continued with a September 17 start against the rival Atlanta Braves in which he pitched seven innings and allowed no runs on just three baserunners. His ERA dropped to 1.08 in 41 2/3 innings. He finished 7–1 in 14 games (5 starts).

On April 26, 2014, Roark threw his first career complete-game shutout (with a perfect game until the 6th), allowing only 3 hits in a 4–0 win over the San Diego Padres. In 31 starts, Roark finished 15–10 with a 2.85 ERA in 198 2/3 innings.

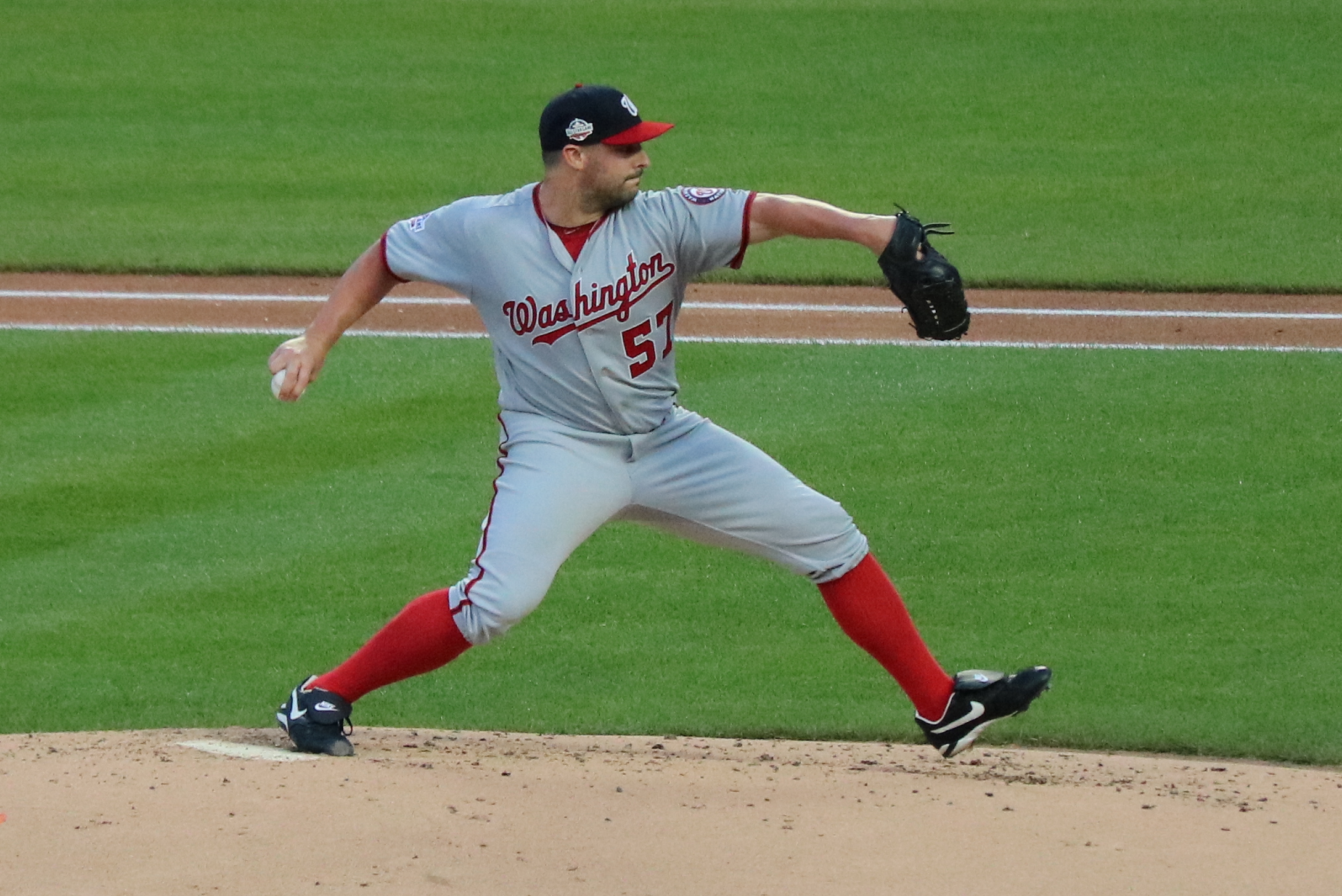
Roark with the Nationals in 2018

In 2015, Roark was shifted to the bullpen after the team acquired a few starting pitchers. In 40 games (12 starts), Roark finished 4–7 with an ERA of 4.38 in 111 innings.

Roark was added back to the starting rotation in 2016, and he responded by establishing a career bests in wins (16), ERA (2.83), innings (210) and strikeouts (172). Additionally, he gave up the lowest percentage of hard-hit balls (24.3%) of any qualified starter that year.

In 2017, Roark went 13–11 despite posting a career-worst 4.67 ERA in 32 games (30 starts). He struck out 166 batters in 181 1/3 innings.

In 2018, Roark went 9–15 with a 4.34 ERA in 180 1/3 innings.

=== Cincinnati Reds ===
On December 12, 2018, the Nationals traded Roark to the Cincinnati Reds for Tanner Rainey. On January 11, 2019, the Reds signed Roark to a one-year contract worth $10 million, avoiding arbitration.

In 2019, Roark went 6–7 with a 4.24 ERA in 110.1 innings (21 starts) prior to being traded to the Oakland Athletics on July 31, 2019.

=== Oakland Athletics ===
On July 31, 2019, the Reds traded Roark to the Oakland Athletics for Jameson Hannah. In 2019, he allowed the highest line drive percentage of all major league pitchers (17.1%). He became a free agent following the season.

=== Toronto Blue Jays ===
On December 18, 2019, Roark signed a two-year contract worth $24 million with the Toronto Blue Jays. With the 2020 Toronto Blue Jays, Roark appeared in 11 games, compiling a 2–3 record with 6.80 ERA and 41 strikeouts in 47 2/3 innings pitched.

Roark pitched to a 6.43 ERA in three games for Toronto in 2021, allowing seven runs in as many innings, before being designated for assignment on April 30, 2021. On May 3, the Blue Jays released Roark.

=== Atlanta Braves ===
On May 11, 2021, Roark signed a minor league contract with the Atlanta Braves. On June 24, Roark was selected to the active roster. After posting a 2.14 ERA in 24 appearances (three starts) for the Gwinnett Stripers, Roark elected free agency on September 5 when he was outrighted off of the 40-man roster.

== International career ==
Roark was selected to the Team USA for the 2017 World Baseball Classic as a replacement for Max Scherzer. He pitched in relief against the Dominican Republic, throwing 41 pitches over 1 1/3 innings and allowing two earned runs. He later started against Japan in the semifinals. Roark, who described it as the biggest start of his career, threw 48 pitches over four scoreless innings. Under an agreement between Team USA and the Nationals, Roark was limited to no more than 50 pitches. Team USA defeated Japan 2–1, marking their first win in WBC semifinal history. Team USA manager Jim Leyland praised Roark's performance post-game, saying, "The key tonight, without question, was Tanner Roark." Team USA would go on to win the championship game against Puerto Rico, securing their first ever WBC title.

== Pitching style ==
Roark's main pitch was a sinker at 92 mph (topping out at 96). He also featured a slider at 85 mph, which he primarily uses against right-handed hitters. Against lefties, he mixed in a curveball at 77 mph and a changeup at 82 mph. He also had a little-used four-seam fastball at 92 mph.

== Personal life ==
Roark has a daughter and son. Roark divorced his wife Amanda in 2021, as seen on his social media page.
