= 2015 Los Angeles Dodgers season =

2015 Los Angeles Dodgers
- National League West champions
- League: National League
- Division: West
- Ballpark: Dodger Stadium
- City: Los Angeles, California
- Record: 92–70 (.568)
- Divisional place: 1st
- Owners: Guggenheim Baseball Management
- President: Stan Kasten
- President of baseball operations: Andrew Friedman
- General managers: Farhan Zaidi
- Managers: Don Mattingly
- Television: SportsNet LA (Vin Scully, Charley Steiner, Orel Hershiser, Nomar Garciaparra, Alanna Rizzo) (Spanish audio feed) (Pepe Yñiguez, Fernando Valenzuela, Manny Mota)
- Radio: KLAC (Vin Scully, Charley Steiner, Rick Monday, Kevin Kennedy); KTNQ (Jaime Jarrín, Jorge Jarrin)

The 2015 Los Angeles Dodgers season was the 126th for the franchise in Major League Baseball, and their 58th season in Los Angeles. The team underwent a change of direction this season as general manager Ned Colletti was fired and replaced by Farhan Zaidi and new president of baseball operations Andrew Friedman.

The Dodgers won their third straight National League West Championship in 2015, marking the first time in franchise history they had made the playoffs three years in a row. The season ended when they lost to the New York Mets in the NLDS. The Dodgers set a major league record this season when they became the first team in history to have a payroll in excess of $300 million.

== Offseason ==
=== MLB-Japan All-Star series ===
Yasiel Puig and Drew Butera participated in the 2014 Major League Baseball Japan All-Star Series during November 2014, playing a series of games against the Japan national baseball team.

=== Front office shakeup ===
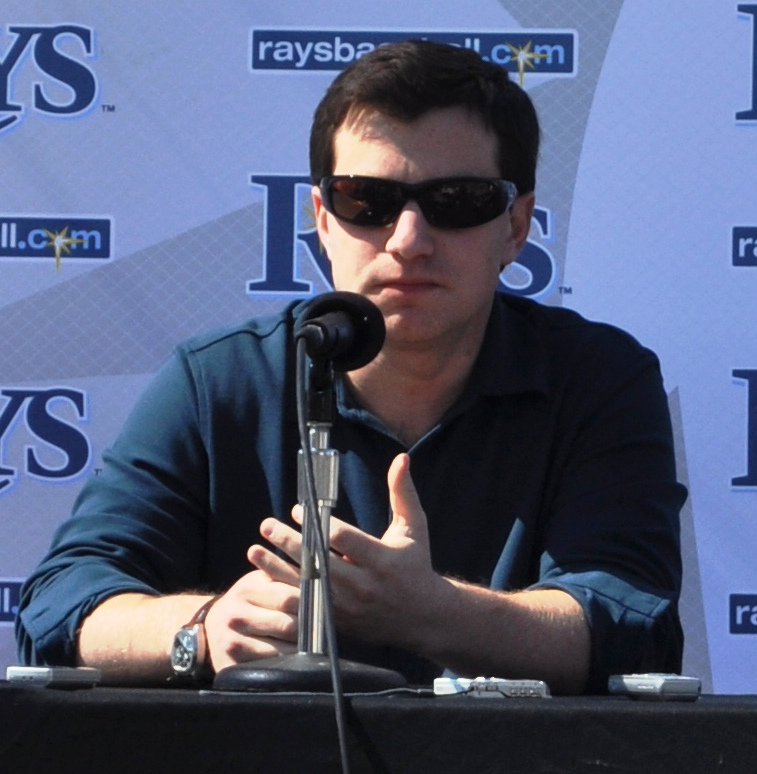
Andrew Friedman joined the team as President of Baseball Operations.

On October 14, 2014, the Dodgers announced that Andrew Friedman was joining the organization as president of baseball operations. Ned Colletti stepped down as general manager, but remained with the team as a special adviser to President Stan Kasten. The Dodgers lost two more key personnel when amateur scouting director Logan White left for a position with the San Diego Padres and player personnel director De Jon Watson left to join the Arizona Diamondbacks. On November 6, they hired Farhan Zaidi as the new general manager and Josh Byrnes as senior vice-president of baseball operations. The following day, they announced the hiring of former outfielder Gabe Kapler as director of player development and Billy Gasparino as director of amateur scouting.

=== Broadcasting ===
On September 30, 2014, the Dodgers announced that they had reached a multi-year agreement with radio broadcaster KLAC for the rights to the Dodgers broadcasts. The deal also included an ownership stake for the Dodgers in the radio station. The Dodgers made a change to their Spanish-language broadcasting team for the 2015 season. Hall of Fame broadcaster Jaime Jarrín, entering his 57th season calling Dodgers games was teamed with his son Jorge Jarrín on radio broadcasts on KTNQ. Pepe Yñiguez and Fernando Valenzuela, who had worked with Jorge Jarrin on the radio for several years made a change to call the games on the Spanish language feed of SportsNet LA, joined by former Dodger coach Manny Mota. It was later announced that former general manager Ned Colletti would be joining the broadcast team as an occasional analyst. Charter Communications became the first additional cable outlet to carry the channel on June 9, increasing the carriage by around 300,000 households.

=== Departures ===
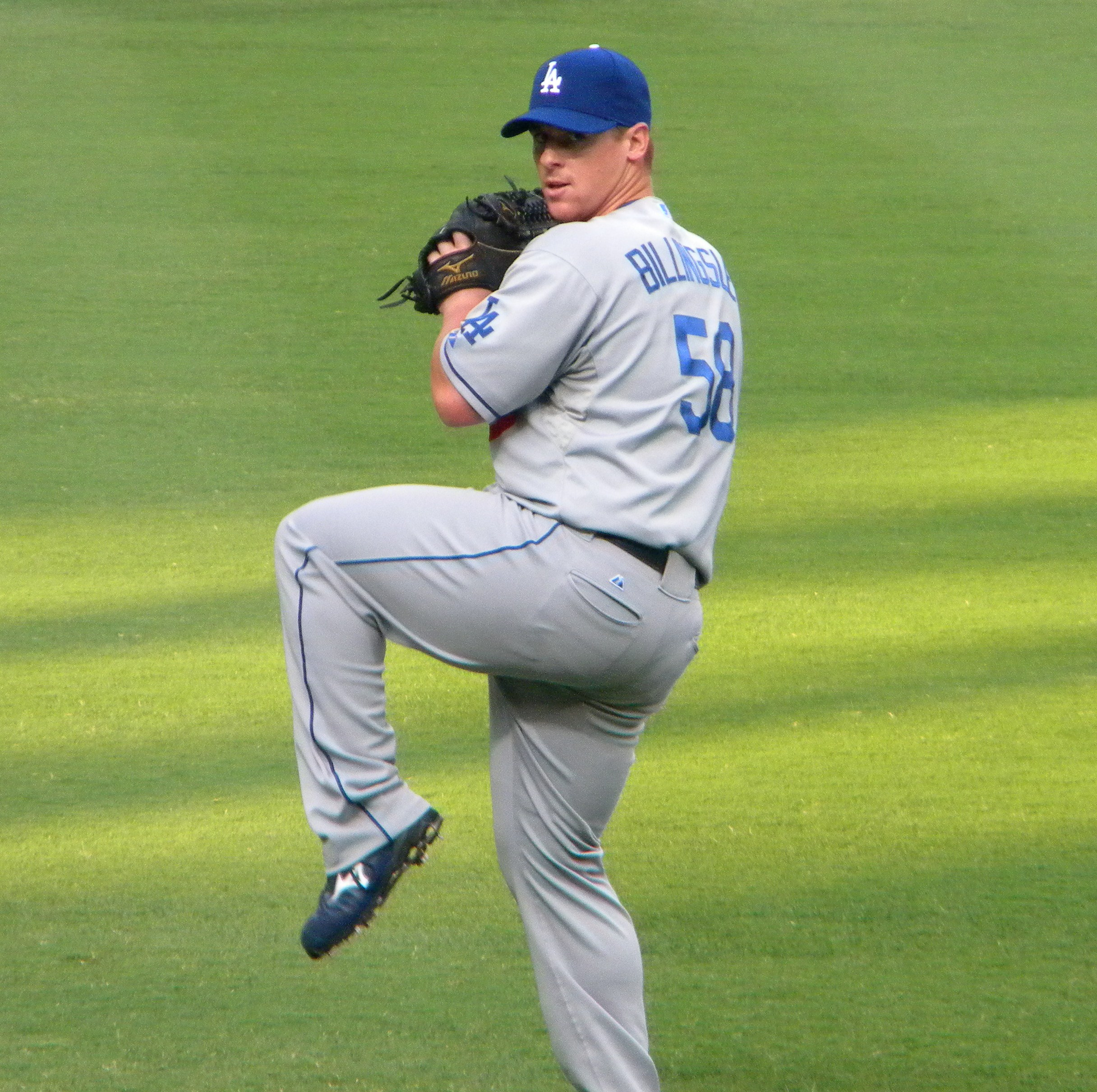
Longtime Dodger starter Chad Billingsley left the team via free agency.

On October 7, 2014, starting pitcher Josh Beckett announced his retirement from baseball. The Dodgers outrighted outfielder Roger Bernadina to the minors and he elected to become a free agent on October 14. On October 30, 2014, the day after the 2014 World Series ended, several Dodger players became free agents. They were shortstop Hanley Ramírez and pitchers Kevin Correia, Roberto Hernández, Paul Maholm, Chris Perez and Jamey Wright. The following day, they declined the 2015 option on starting pitcher Chad Billingsley, who had missed most of the previous two seasons with injury. Another former first round pick left the organization on November 3, when left-handed pitcher Scott Elbert elected to become a free agent after the Dodgers outrighted him to the minors. Also on that day, the club offered Ramirez a qualifying offer which he rejected and the club received a compensatory selection in the 2015 MLB draft when he signed with the Boston Red Sox on November 25. The Chicago White Sox claimed relief pitcher Onelki García off waivers from the Dodgers on November 20. The Dodgers designated several players for assignment during the off-season including backup catcher Drew Butera and relief pitcher Jarret Martin. Butera was traded to the Los Angeles Angels of Anaheim in exchange for a player to be named later or cash and minor league outfielder Matt Long was sent over from the Angels on December 18 to complete the trade. Long and Martin were then traded to the Milwaukee Brewers for minor league catcher Shawn Zarraga. The Dodgers made the unusual move of designating relief pitcher Brian Wilson for assignment on December 16, despite owing him $10 million for the 2015 season.

=== Trades / acquisitions ===
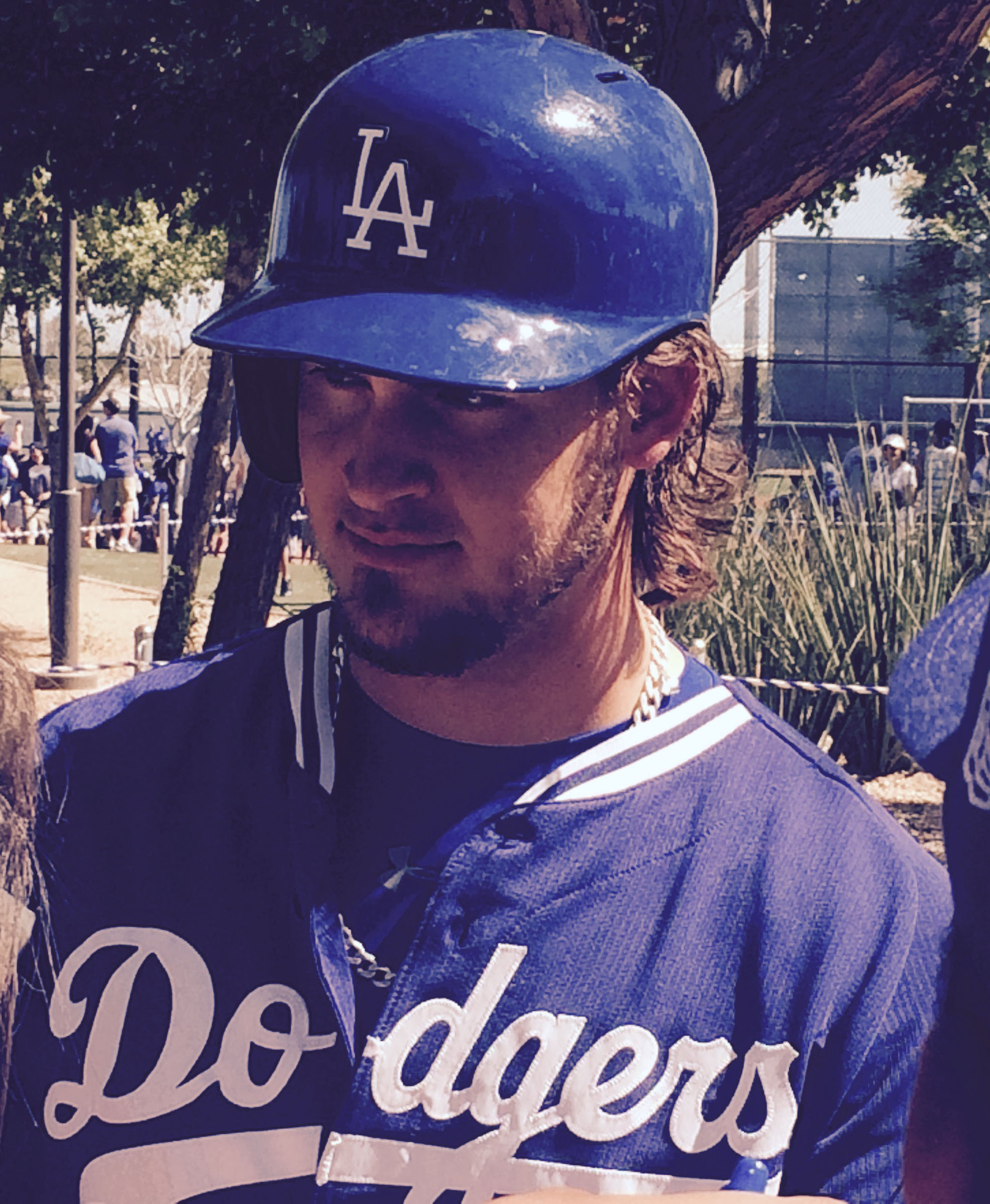
Yasmani Grandal was acquired via trade from the San Diego Padres in the offseason

The Dodgers on November 17, acquired minor league outfielder Kyle Jensen from the Miami Marlins for a player to be named later or cash considerations. (Single-A pitcher Craig Stem was sent to Miami to complete the deal on December 15.) On November 20, they acquired relief pitchers Joel Peralta and Adam Liberatore from the Tampa Bay Rays in exchange for Jose Dominguez and minor leaguer Greg Harris. On November 22, the Dodgers acquired right-handed pitcher Mike Bolsinger from the Arizona Diamondbacks in exchange for cash consideration. A couple of days later, on November 24, they acquired right-handed pitcher Juan Nicasio from the Colorado Rockies in exchange for a player to be named later or cash. (Double-A outfielder Noel Cuevas was later sent to the Rockies to complete the trade.) On December 2, they added to the outfield depth by acquiring Chris Heisey from the Cincinnati Reds in exchange for pitcher Matt Magill. The Dodgers claimed catcher/first baseman Ryan Lavarnway off waivers from the Boston Red Sox on December 5.

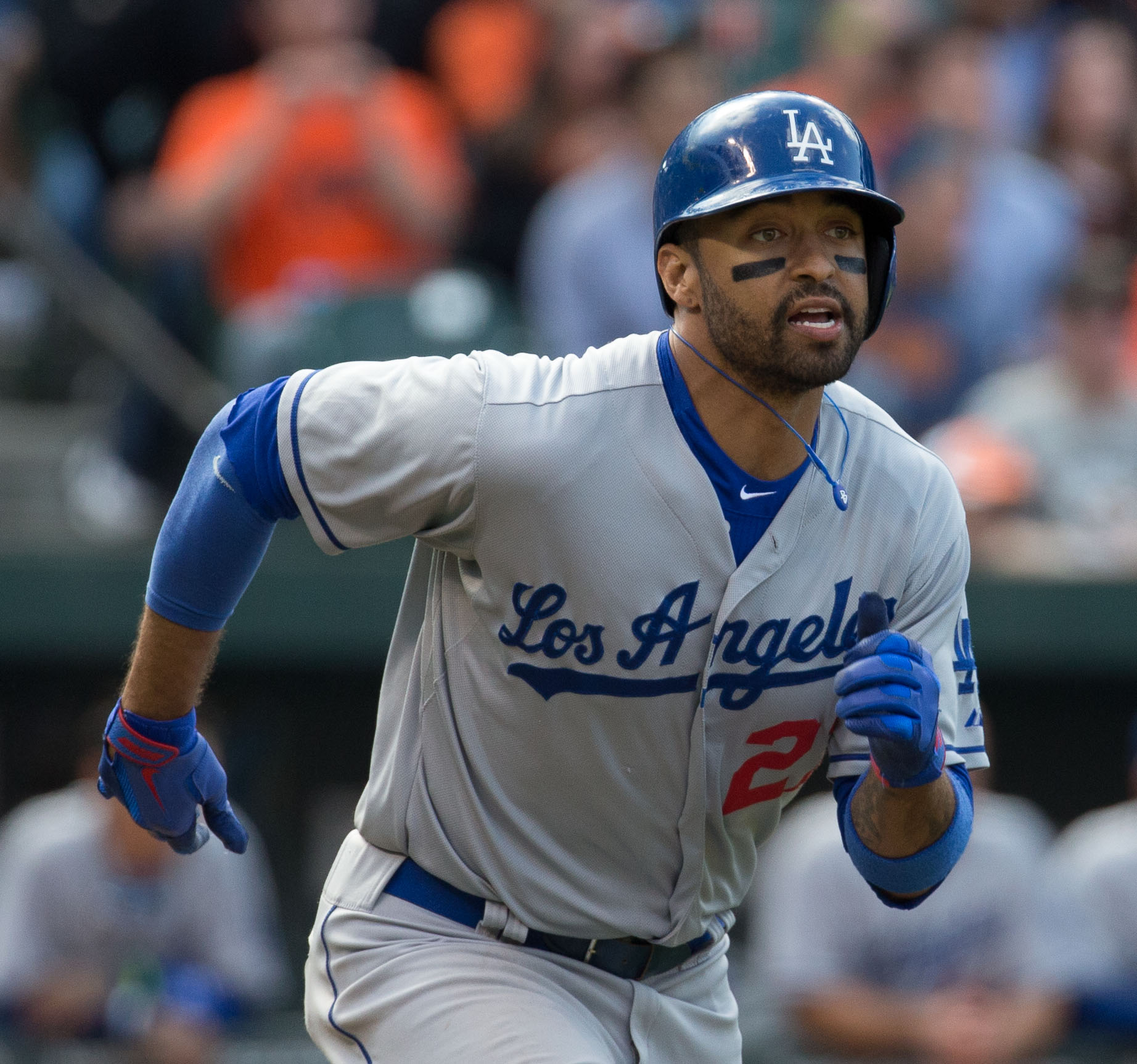
Matt Kemp's long tenure with the team ended when he was traded during the off-season

On December 10, the Dodgers traded second baseman Dee Gordon, starting pitcher Dan Haren, utility infielder Miguel Rojas and a player to be named later or cash to the Miami Marlins in exchange for starting pitcher Andrew Heaney, reliever Chris Hatcher, utility player Enrique Hernández and minor league catcher/infielder Austin Barnes. They then sent Heaney to the Los Angeles Angels of Anaheim for second baseman Howie Kendrick. Lavarnway was designated for assignment to make room on the roster, and was later claimed off waivers by the Chicago Cubs.

On December 18, the Dodgers announced that they had traded two-time All-Star outfielder Matt Kemp and backup catcher Tim Federowicz to the San Diego Padres for catcher Yasmani Grandal and minor league pitchers Joe Wieland and Zach Eflin. The Dodgers also agreed to pay $32 million of the remaining $107 million in Kemp's contract. The deal was originally struck on December 11 but the Padres had concerns over Kemp's physical, which reportedly revealed that he had arthritis in both hips. They attempted to re-negotiate the deal at that point but the Dodgers said no and the swap was eventually finalized. They then sent Eflin and 2013 second round draft pick Tom Windle to the Philadelphia Phillies to acquire shortstop Jimmy Rollins. Jensen was designated for assignment to make room for Rollins.

=== Free agent signings ===
On December 16, starting pitcher Brandon McCarthy was signed to a four-year, $48 million, contract. On December 31, they signed another starting pitcher, Brett Anderson, to a one-year, $10 million, contract.

Off-season transaction chart

Departing Player	New team	Transaction	Arriving player	Old team	Transaction
Josh Beckett	N/A	Retired	Kyle Jensen	Miami Marlins	Trade
Roger Bernadina	Colorado Rockies	Outrighted and declared free agency	Joel Peralta	Tampa Bay Rays	Trade
Stephen Fife	unsigned	Outrighted and declared free agency	Adam Liberatore	Tampa Bay Rays	Trade
Hanley Ramírez	Boston Red Sox	Free agent	Mike Bolsinger	Arizona Diamondbacks	Trade
Kevin Correia	Seattle Mariners	Free agent	Juan Nicasio	Colorado Rockies	Trade
Roberto Hernández	Houston Astros	Free agent	Chris Heisey	Cincinnati Reds	Trade
Paul Maholm	Cincinnati Reds	Free agent	Ryan Lavarnway	Boston Red Sox	Waiver claim
Chris Perez	Milwaukee Brewers	Free agent	Andrew Heaney	Miami Marlins	Trade
Jamey Wright	Texas Rangers	Free agent	Chris Hatcher	Miami Marlins	Trade
Chad Billingsley	Philadelphia Phillies	Option declined	Enrique Hernández	Miami Marlins	Trade
Scott Elbert	San Diego Padres	Outrighted and declared free agency	Austin Barnes	Miami Marlins	Trade
Onelki García	Chicago White Sox	Waiver claim	Howie Kendrick	Los Angeles Angels of Anaheim	Trade
Drew Butera	Los Angeles Angels of Anaheim	Trade	Matt Long	Los Angeles Angels of Anaheim	Trade
José Dominguez	Tampa Bay Rays	Trade	Shawn Zarraga	Milwaukee Brewers	Trade
Greg Harris	Tampa Bay Rays	Trade	Brandon McCarthy	New York Yankees	Free agent signing
Noel Cuevas	Colorado Rockies	Trade	Yasmani Grandal	San Diego Padres	Trade
Matt Magill	Cincinnati Reds	Trade	Joe Wieland	San Diego Padres	Trade
Dee Gordon	Miami Marlins	Trade	Zach Eflin	San Diego Padres	Trade
Dan Haren	Miami Marlins	Trade	Jimmy Rollins	Philadelphia Phillies	Trade
Miguel Rojas	Miami Marlins	Trade	Brett Anderson	Colorado Rockies	Free agent signing
Andrew Heaney	Los Angeles Angels of Anaheim	Trade	Érik Bédard	Tampa Bay Rays	minor league free agent
Jarret Martin	Milwaukee Brewers	Trade	Ryan Buchter	Atlanta Braves	minor league free agent
Matt Long	Milwaukee Brewers	Trade	David Huff	New York Yankees	minor league free agent
Ryan Lavarnway	Chicago Cubs	Waiver claim	Sergio Santos	Toronto Blue Jays	minor league free agent
Brian Wilson	unsigned	Released	Alí Solís	Tampa Bay Rays	minor league free agent
Matt Kemp	San Diego Padres	Trade	Matt Carson	Cleveland Indians	minor league free agent
Tim Federowicz	San Diego Padres	Trade	Ben Rowen	Texas Rangers	minor league free agent
Zach Eflin	Philadelphia Phillies	Trade	David Aardsma	St. Louis Cardinals	minor league free agent
Tom Windle	Philadelphia Phillies	Trade			
Craig Stem	Miami Marlins	Trade			

== Spring training ==
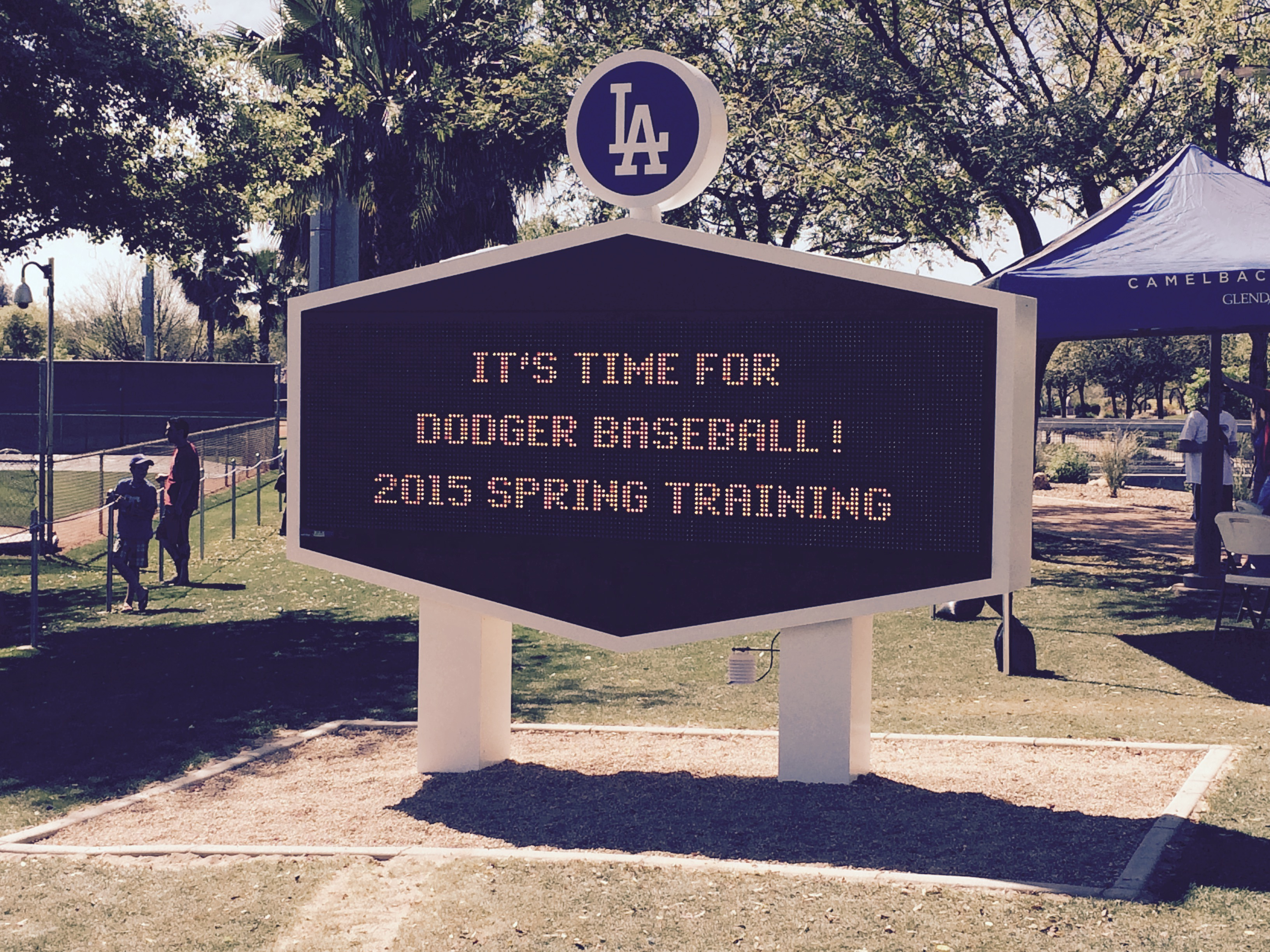
Sign greeting visitors to Dodgers spring training

The Dodgers began spring training at Camelback Ranch on February 19, 2015, when pitchers and catchers reported. They suffered their first significant injury of the season just before the start of camp when closer Kenley Jansen underwent surgery to remove a growth on his foot, sidelining him for all of camp and the start of the season. The Dodgers added to their depth with two additional free agent signings the first weekend of camp. They signed starting pitcher Brandon Beachy to a one-year, $2.75 million, contract that included a club option for 2016. Coming off Tommy John surgery, Beach was not expected to be ready to join the team until mid-season. They also signed pitcher Dustin McGowan to a one-year contract to add depth to the bullpen and possibly serve as a spot starter if needed. However, McGowan did not pitch well in spring training and was released at the end of March.

Position players arrived on February 25, with the first full squad workout the next day. The Cactus League schedule began on March 4. Starting pitcher Hyun-jin Ryu suffered from a sore shoulder and was shut down in mid-March. An MRI revealed no significant damage but he was shut down for a few weeks and was not on the Dodgers' opening day roster. Reliever Brandon League also experienced shoulder pain that shut him down in March and jeopardized his season.

The Dodgers drew 147,066 fans to their 15 spring training games at Camelback Ranch, setting a new franchise spring training record.

== Standings ==
=== National League West ===
NL West
Team	W	L	Pct.	GB	Home	Road
Los Angeles Dodgers	92	70	.568	—	55‍–‍26	37‍–‍44
San Francisco Giants	84	78	.519	8	47‍–‍34	37‍–‍44
Arizona Diamondbacks	79	83	.488	13	39‍–‍42	40‍–‍41
San Diego Padres	74	88	.457	18	39‍–‍42	35‍–‍46
Colorado Rockies	68	94	.420	24	36‍–‍45	32‍–‍49

=== National League Wild Card ===
Wild Card standings

Division leaders
Team	W	L	Pct.
St. Louis Cardinals	100	62	.617
Los Angeles Dodgers	92	70	.568
New York Mets	90	72	.556

Wild Card teams (Top 2 teams qualify for postseason)
Team	W	L	Pct.	GB
Pittsburgh Pirates	98	64	.605	+1
Chicago Cubs	97	65	.599	—
San Francisco Giants	84	78	.519	13
Washington Nationals	83	79	.512	14
Arizona Diamondbacks	79	83	.488	18
San Diego Padres	74	88	.457	23
Miami Marlins	71	91	.438	26
Milwaukee Brewers	68	94	.420	29
Colorado Rockies	68	94	.420	29
Atlanta Braves	67	95	.414	30
Cincinnati Reds	64	98	.395	33
Philadelphia Phillies	63	99	.389	34

=== Record vs. opponents ===
NL Records

2015 National League record Source: MLB Standings Grid – 2015
Team	AZ	ATL	CHC	CIN	COL	LAD	MIA	MIL	NYM	PHI	PIT	SD	SF	STL	WSH	AL
Arizona	—	3–3	2–4	6–1	13–6	6–13	5–2	5–2	2–5	2–4	1–5	9–10	11–8	0–7	3–4	11–9
Atlanta	3–3	—	1–6	3–4	1–6	3–3	10–9	5–2	8–11	11–8	2–4	2–5	3–4	4–2	5–14	6–14
Chicago	4–2	6–1	—	13–6	4–2	3–4	3–3	14–5	7–0	2–5	11–8	3–3	5–2	8–11	4–3	10–10
Cincinnati	1–6	4–3	6–13	—	2–4	1–6	3–4	9–10	0–7	4–2	11–8	2–4	2–5	7–12	5–1	7–13
Colorado	6–13	6–1	2–4	4–2	—	8–11	2–5	5–1	0–7	5–2	1–6	7–12	11–8	3–4	3–3	5–15
Los Angeles	13–6	3–3	4–3	6–1	11–8	—	4–2	4–3	3–4	5–2	1–5	14–5	8–11	2–5	4–2	10–10
Miami	2–5	9–10	3–3	4–3	5–2	2–4	—	4–2	8–11	9–10	1–6	2–5	5–2	1–5	9–10	7–13
Milwaukee	2–5	2–5	5–14	10–9	1–5	3–4	2–4	—	3–3	7–0	10–9	5–2	1–5	6–13	3–4	8–12
New York	5–2	11–8	0–7	7–0	7–0	4–3	11–8	3–3	—	14–5	0–6	2–4	3–3	3–4	11–8	9–11
Philadelphia	4–2	8–11	5–2	2–4	2–5	2–5	10–9	0–7	5–14	—	2–5	5–1	1–5	2–5	7–12	8–12
Pittsburgh	5–1	4–2	8–11	8–11	6–1	5–1	6–1	9–10	6–0	5–2	—	5–2	6–1	9–10	3–4	13–7
San Diego	10–9	5–2	3–3	4–2	12–7	5–14	5–2	2–5	4–2	1–5	2–5	—	8–11	4–3	2–5	7–13
San Francisco	8–11	4–3	2–5	5–2	8–11	11–8	2–5	5–1	3–3	5–1	1–6	11–8	—	2–4	4–3	13–7
St. Louis	7–0	2–4	11–8	12–7	4–3	5–2	5–1	13–6	4–3	5–2	10–9	3–4	4–2	—	4–2	11–9
Washington	4–3	14–5	3–4	1–5	3–3	2–4	10–9	4–3	8–11	12–7	4–3	5–2	3–4	2–4	—	8–12

== Regular season ==
Opening Day starters
Name	Position
Jimmy Rollins	Shortstop
Yasiel Puig	Right fielder
Adrián González	First baseman
Howie Kendrick	Second baseman
Carl Crawford	Left fielder
Juan Uribe	Third baseman
Joc Pederson	Center fielder
A. J. Ellis	Catcher
Clayton Kershaw	Starting pitcher

=== April ===
Clayton Kershaw made his fifth straight opening day start for the Dodgers on April 6 against the San Diego Padres at Dodger Stadium, the first Dodgers pitcher to do so since Don Sutton started seven in a row from 1972 through 1978. Former Dodger Matt Kemp had two hits, including a double, against his former team to drive in all three runs for the Padres as they jumped to the lead. Jimmy Rollins in his first regular season appearance with the Dodgers hit a three-run homer in the eighth inning as the Dodgers came from behind to claim a 6–3 win to start the season. In the second game, the Padres pounced on Dodgers reliever Chris Hatcher to score four-runs in the ninth inning and pull away for a 7–3 victory to even the series. In the last game, on April 9, Adrián González had four hits in four at-bats, with three of them being solo homers as the Dodgers won 7–4. González became the first player in MLB history to hit five home runs in his team's first three games.

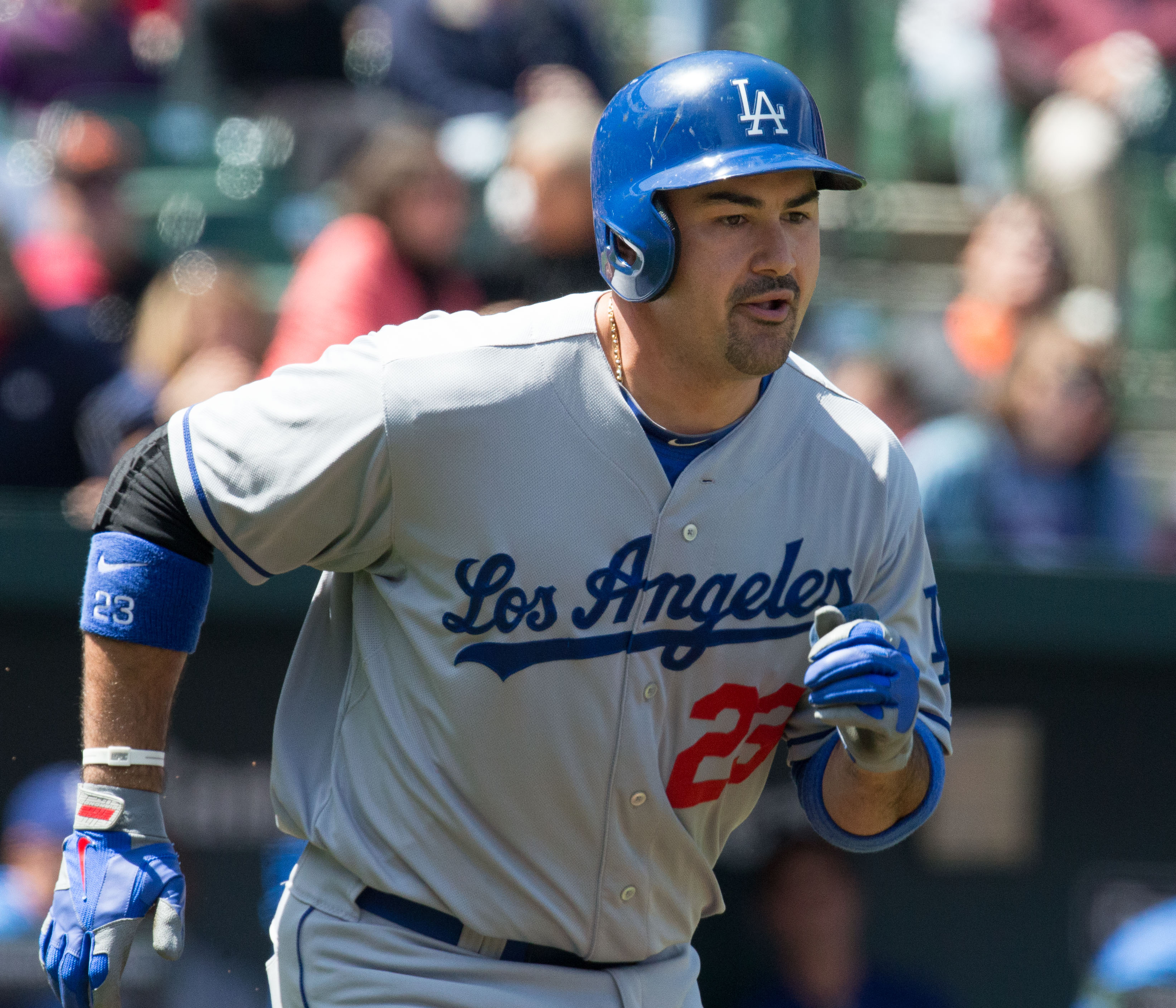
Adrián González was the National League player of the month for April

The Dodgers started their first road trip of the season by losing to the Arizona Diamondbacks 4–3 in ten innings on April 10 at Chase Field. Diamondbacks pitcher Archie Bradley dominated the Dodgers in his first Major League start the next night, allowing only one hit and striking out six in six scoreless innings. Kershaw, in his second start, was charged with 10 hits and six runs in 6 1/3 innings as the Dodgers lost 6–0. Zack Greinke pitched seven shutout innings and the offense was led by rookies Joc Pederson and Alex Guerrero, who both hit their first major league home runs, in a 7–4 victory on April 12 to avoid the sweep.

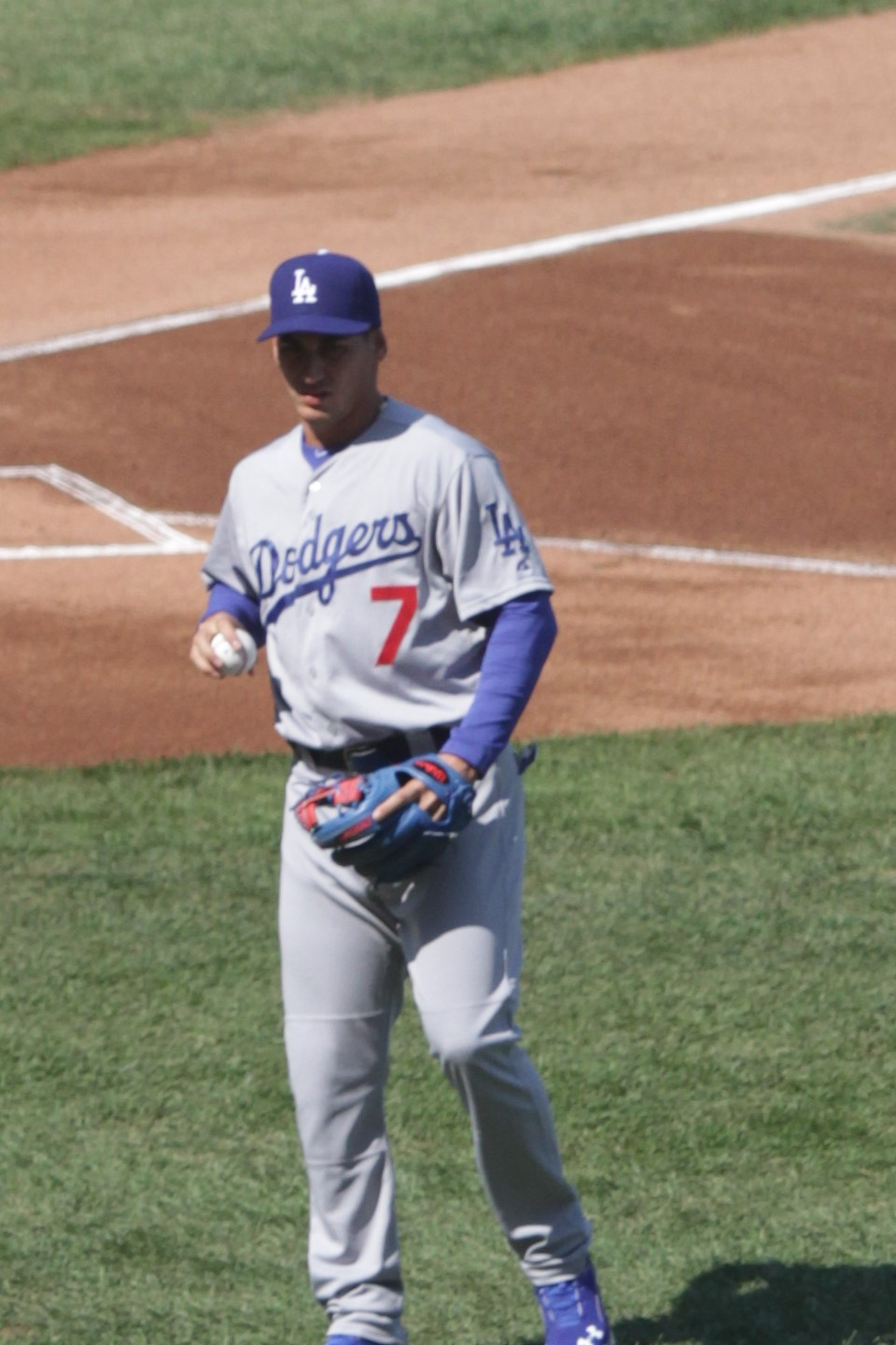
Alex Guerrero was the National League rookie of the month for April when he hit .423 with five homers and 13 RBI in only 13 games

The Dodgers returned home on April 13 for an interleague series against the Seattle Mariners. Brandon McCarthy struck out 10 in seven innings but also allowed four home runs, the first player in MLB history with that stat line, while also allowing no walks. The Dodgers came from behind and won the game, 6–5, on a walk off hit by Guerrero in the 10th inning. The Dodgers fell behind early in the next game, as fill-in starter David Huff allowed back-to-back home runs in the top of the first. However, they battled back and won the game on a 2-run walk-off single by Howie Kendrick, 6–5. They completed the sweep with a 5–2 win over the Mariners on Jackie Robinson Day. González had two more hits, setting a Dodgers team record with 19 in the first nine games of the season. Howie Kendrick homered and doubled and Adrián González drove in a couple of RBIs as the Dodgers continued their winning streak with a 7–3 win over the Colorado Rockies. Kershaw struck out 12 in six innings to pick up his first win of the season. González and Kendrick remained the hitting stars the next night as the Dodgers win streak reached six games with a 6–3 victory over the Rockies. González matched Eric Karros (1995) for the most hits (23) by a Dodger through 11 games of the season and the Dodgers scored five or more runs in six straight games for the first time since May 17–22, 2012. The Dodgers completed the sweep of the Rockies with a 7–0 win on April 19 as Scott Van Slyke had two doubles and a homer. The Dodgers as a team had 10 extra base hits in the game, the first time at home since 2006.

The Dodgers went back on the road and saw the winning streak snapped with a 6–2 loss to the San Francisco Giants at AT&T Park. In the second game of the series, the Giants won again, 3–2, on a walk-off sacrifice fly by Joe Panik with the bases load. The Dodgers called up Mike Bolsinger from AAA Oklahoma City to start the final game of the series and he pitched well, allowing only one run in 5 2/3 innings. However the bullpen faltered and the Giants walked-off with another 3–2 win, this time in 10 innings, to complete the series sweep. Greinke struck out seven while allowing just four hits in seven scoreless innings as the Dodgers won the first game of the weekend series against the Padres at Petco Park, 3–0. The Dodgers hit four home runs on April 25 as they won a slugfest with the Padres, 11–8. Andre Ethier's home run and three hits on the night gave him 22 homers and 143 hits in his career against San Diego, the most by any player against that team. The victory was a costly one, however, as starting pitcher Brandon McCarthy suffered a torn Ulnar collateral ligament in his elbow, a season-ending injury. Scott Baker was called up from Oklahoma City to start the next game and pitched well but the offense failed to produce and the Dodgers lost the final game of the road trip, 3–1.

The Dodgers returned home on April 27 to play the Giants. Joc Pederson and Justin Turner each homered in the 8–3 win to extend the home winning streak to eight games, the longest since the 2009 season. The Dodgers scored at least five runs in each of those eight wins, the longest such streak in franchise history. Both streaks were snapped the next night as Kershaw allowed only two runs in seven innings with eight strikeouts but was out performed by Madison Bumgarner who allowed only one run on five hits with nine strikeouts in eight innings. The Giants won 2–1. The Dodgers hit four home runs to win the final game of the series, 7–3, and end the month of April with a Major League leading 32 home runs in 21 games.

=== May ===
Carlos Frías pitched 5 1/3 scoreless innings in his first start of the season, and rookie Joc Pederson hit a grand slam home run as the Dodgers opened the month of May with an 8–0 rout of the Arizona Diamondbacks at Dodger Stadium. The Dodgers came from behind to take game two of the series, 6–4. Pederson homered again, becoming the first Dodgers rookie since Bill Sudakis in the 1969 season to homer in four straight ballgames. A walk-off homer by Yasmani Grandal in the 13th inning gave the Dodgers a 1–0 win on May 3 and the sweep of the Diamondbacks. The game was the longest scoreless duel between the two teams since the game on June 2, 2010, ended in the 14th inning.

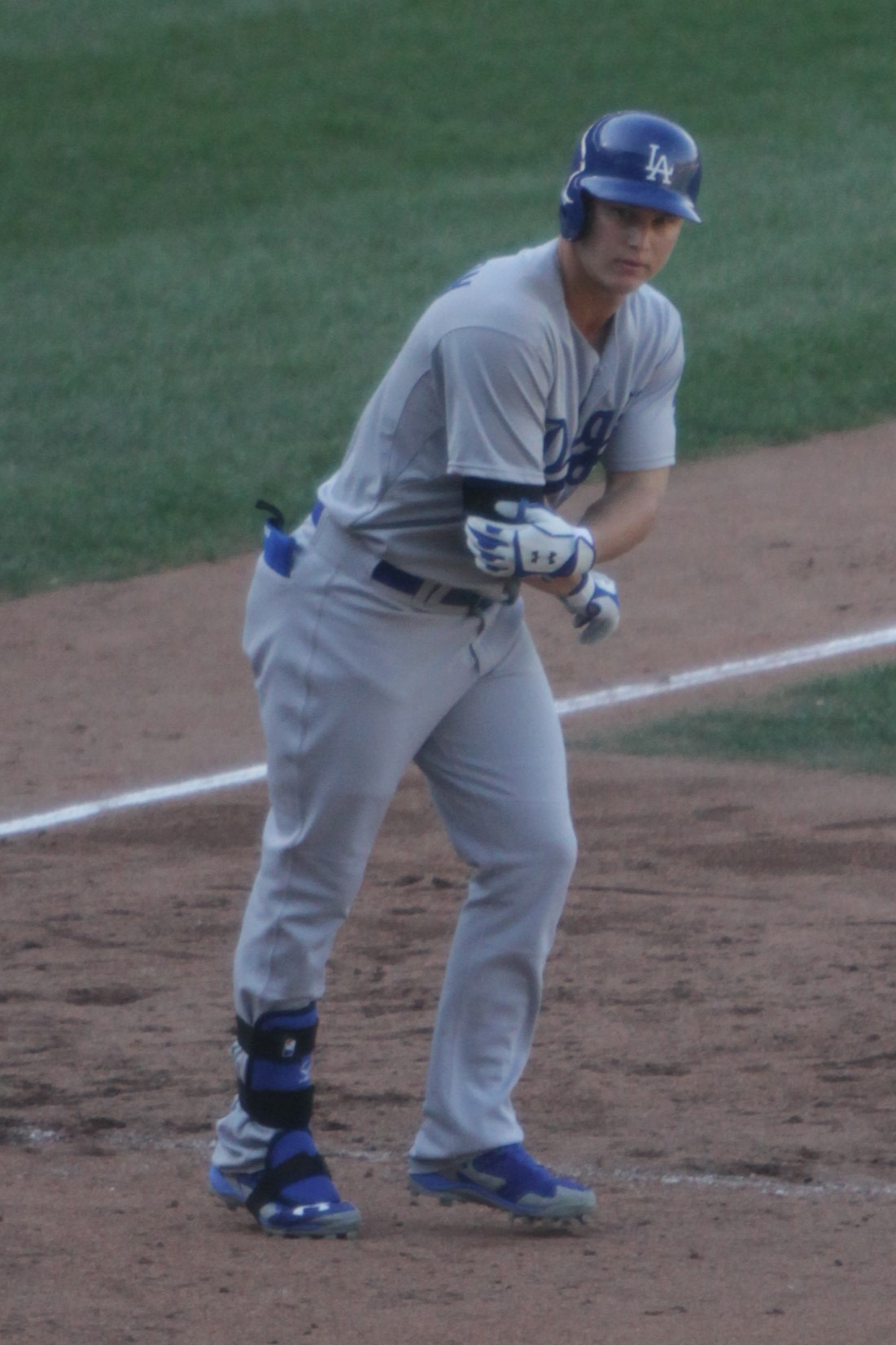
Joc Pederson hit a grand slam home run to start the month of May and set a new Dodgers rookie record with 20 home runs before the All-Star break

The Dodgers next opened a series at Miller Park against the Milwaukee Brewers. In the opener Clayton Kershaw held the Brewers to a run on three hits through seven innings, but he then allowed a homer and double to lead off the eighth. Relief pitcher Chris Hatcher allowed the tying and go-ahead runs to score and the Dodgers dropped the opener of the series 4–3. That snapped a string of 26 consecutive scoreless innings for the Dodger bullpen. Zack Greinke held the Brewers to an unearned run and two hits in 7 2/3 innings to pick up his 10th straight win (dating back to the previous August). Justin Turner hit a three-run homer and Jimmy Rollins and Adrián González each hit two-run homers as the Dodgers won the second game 8–2. The following day, Joc Pederson homered twice but the Brewers scored five runs in the first inning off of Joe Wieland, who was making his first start of the season after being called up from the minors. The Brewers held on to win 6–3. Yasmani Grandal hit two 3-run home runs and recorded a career high of eight RBIs in the Dodgers 14–4 rout of the Brewers to split the series. The team traveled to Coors Field to play the Colorado Rockies on May 8, and won 2–1 in a game that was halted after one out in the top of the sixth due to rain. The rain continued through the weekend, forcing the middle game of the series to be postponed. The last game was played and Justin Turner's two-run homer broke a tie at the top of the eight inning and led the Dodgers to a 9–5 win.

The Dodgers returned home on May 12 and Greinke pitched well, allowing only one run in seven innings, but the Miami Marlins came back with a two-run homer by Christian Yelich off Yimi García in the top of ninth to put them ahead. Scott Van Slyke then hit a three-run walk-off homer off Marlins closer Steve Cishek for the 5–3 win. In the following game, Andre Ethier had five hits, including a home run, and the Dodgers scored 11 runs on 21 hits to rout the Marlins and former Dodger Dan Haren 11–1. Former Dodger Dee Gordon had four hits and scored twice and Giancarlo Stanton drove in three runs as the Marlins came from behind, in a three-run seventh inning, to beat the Dodgers 5–4 to avoid the sweep. In the next game, the Rockies also came from behind as Carlos González hit a three-run homer off Yimi Garcia in the ninth inning to give them a 5–4 win, snapping the Dodgers nine-game winning streak against the Rockies. It was Garcia's second blown save of the week. Kershaw struck out 10 batters while allowing three runs in 6 2/3 innings on May 15 to pick up his 100th career win in a 6–4 victory over the Rockies. Jimmy Rollins had four hits and two RBI in the game. In the following game, Greinke's win streak came to an end as the Dodgers were only able to get three hits off of Jorge de la Rosa and the Rockies bullpen. Greinke only allowed one run on four hits in six innings but the bullpen allowed the close game to become a rout and the Dodgers lost 7–1. The Dodgers earned a series split when Yasmani Grandal's RBI single drove in the only run in a 1–0 victory over the Rockies on May 17.

The Dodgers returned to AT&T Park on May 19 and were shut out by Tim Hudson and the Giants 2–0. They were again unable to score the following night as Tim Lincecum and the Giants blanked the Dodgers 4–0. In the third game, it was Madison Bumgarner's turn to silence the Dodgers bats and he also hit a solo homer in the Giants 4–0 win to complete the sweep. This was the second scoreless sweep by the Giants over the Dodgers in four years and tied the franchise record for consecutive shutouts (three) that had been done four other times. The Dodgers also tied a franchise record for the lowest scoring five game period (two) that had also been set four times before. This was the first time the Dodgers had been swept in back-to-back road series at San Francisco since 1961.

Back at Dodger Stadium, the scoreless streak reached 35 innings (tying a Los Angeles Dodgers record set in 1962) before they finally scored a run in the fifth inning on an RBI double by Andre Ethier. Greinke allowed only one run on six hits in 7 2/3 innings but was out of the game when Joc Pederson hit the tie-breaking solo homer in the eighth inning to give the Dodgers a 2–1 victory over the San Diego Padres. On May 23, Mike Bolsinger allowed a lead off single to open the game and then retired the next 23 batters he faced, shutting down the Padres offense over eight innings. Closer Kenley Jansen retired the side in order in the ninth. The two of them combined to face the minimum 27 batters in the game, the first time the Dodgers had done such a feat since Odalis Pérez pitched a one-hitter against the Cubs on April 26, 2002. Pederson homered again, leading off the bottom of the first, and the Dodgers won 2–0. Carlos Frias had a poor outing the following day, tying a L.A. Dodger record by allowing 10 earned runs in only four innings in a game eventually won by the Padres 11–3. The Dodgers hit three home runs in the eighth inning on Memorial Day to break open a tied game and defeat the Atlanta Braves 6–3. Kershaw struck out 10 in seven scoreless innings the following day and the Dodgers scored six runs in the fourth inning off Julio Teherán as they rolled to an 8–0 victory. Adrián González two-run home run that inning accounted for the 1,000th and 1,001st RBI of his career. Zack Greinke allowed only one run on three hits over six innings while striking out nine in the final game of the homestand. However, the Braves scored twice off the Dodgers bullpen in the eighth inning for a 3–2 win.

The Dodgers were shut out 3–0 by the St. Louis Cardinals at Busch Stadium on May 29 as John Lackey struck out nine in seven innings. This was the fourth straight road game that the Dodgers were shut out (the longest streak in franchise history), and they fell out of first place for the first time since April 15. Michael Wacha held the Dodgers hitless through five innings in the next game, extending the Dodgers' road scoreless innings streak to a franchise-record 42 innings, breaking the mark previously set by the 1908 Brooklyn Superbas. They finally scored in the sixth inning, with a three-run homer by Yasmani Grandal. Carlos Frias allowed only one unearned run in a career-high seven innings, as the Dodgers won 5–1. The team struggled on offense again the next day, managing only two hits in a 3–1 loss to the Cardinals to wrap up the month of May.

=== June ===
The Dodgers opened the month of June with an 11–4 win over the Rockies on the road. Clayton Kershaw allowed only two earned runs in seven innings, while also recording three hits and an RBI. Andre Ethier, Jimmy Rollins, Howie Kendrick, and Joc Pederson all homered in the win. The Dodgers and Rockies played a doubleheader on June 2, a result of the rain-out the previous time they met in Denver. In the first game, Michael McKenry homered, doubled, and drove in three runs and the Rockies won 6–3. In the second game, Alex Guerrero hit a grand slam home run in the ninth inning to give the Dodgers the 9–8 win. This was the first go-ahead grand slam by the Dodgers with two out in the ninth inning or later since Nomar Garciaparra hit one in 2006. Joc Pederson homered in both games of the doubleheader, giving him four straight games with a home run. His second homer on this day was estimated at 480 feet, the longest in the Majors at that point. He homered again in the next game, the first rookie in history to homer in five straight games and tying the Dodgers franchise record (shared with Adrián González, Matt Kemp, Shawn Green, and Roy Campanella). The Dodgers lost the game 7–6 when the bullpen coughed up the lead in the ninth as four relievers were only able to record one out.

Back home, the Dodgers lost to the Cardinals 7–1 as Michael Wacha shut down their offense. Two runs in the eighth inning led to a 2–1 loss the next night. Kershaw allowed only one hit in eight innings while striking out 11 on June 6 as the Dodgers came up with a 2–0 win to end their brief skid. Zack Greinke pitched 6 2/3 innings and only allowed one run while striking out eight in the series finale, however the bullpen again coughed up the lead in the eighth inning and the Dodgers lost 4–2. This was the first home series loss by the Dodgers since August 2014, the longest such span in the Majors during that time. Andre Ethier and Jimmy Rollins each hit three-run home runs to back strong pitching by Mike Bolsinger as the Dodgers routed the Diamondbacks 9–3 in the next game. Howie Kendrick homered and drove in all three runs in the Dodgers 3–1 win over the Diamondbacks on June 9. The Dodgers wrapped up the homestand with a 7–6 win over the Diamondbacks. Yasiel Puig was 4-for-4 with a homer and a walk as the Dodgers won on a walk-off RBI single by Kendrick.

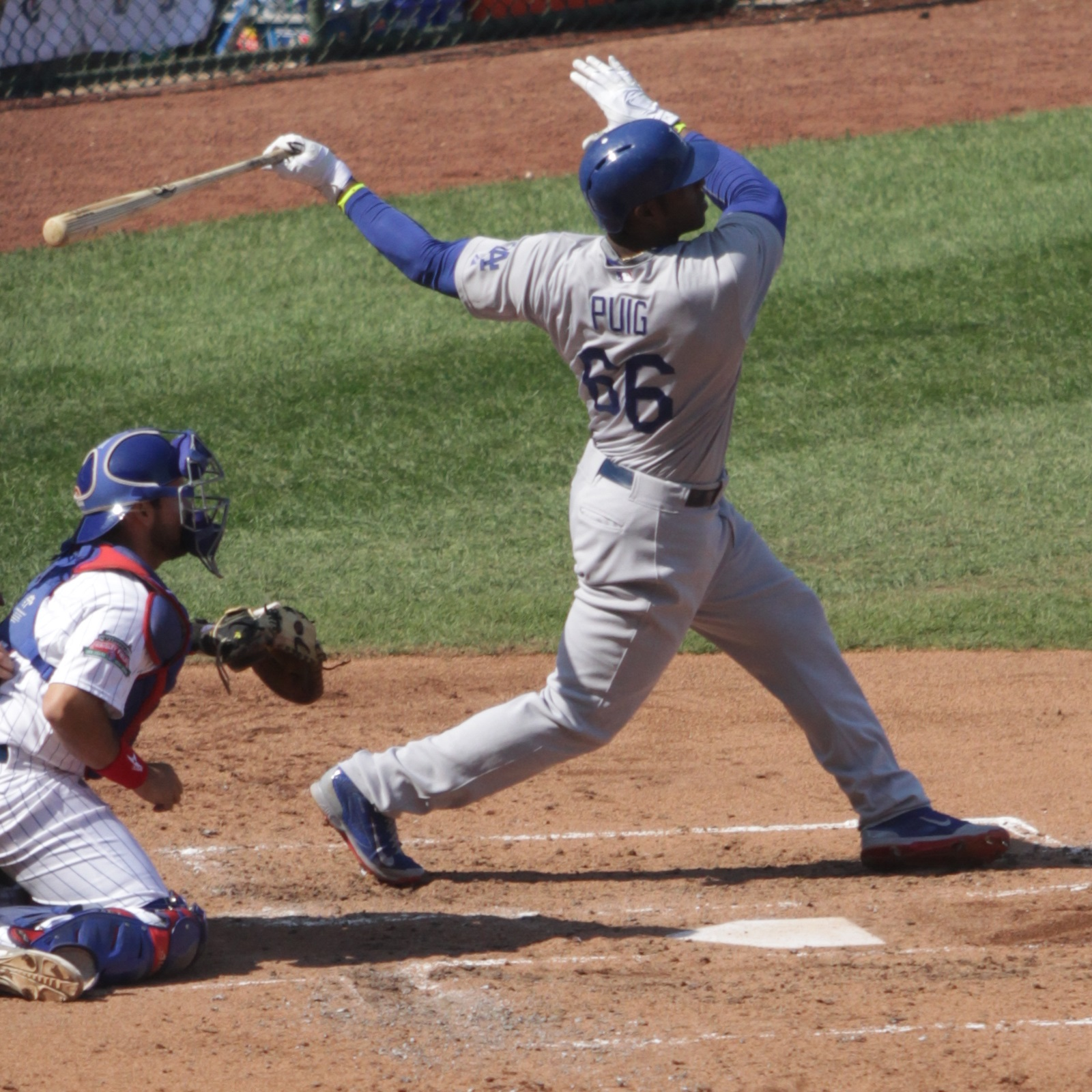
Yasiel Puig was a perfect 4-for-4 with a homer on June 10.

In the opening game of the next series, against the Padres, Kershaw allowed only one run in 6 2/3 innings while striking out 11 and left with a one-run lead. The bullpen allowed two runs in the eighth to blow the lead but the Dodgers retook the lead in the bottom of the inning and they won 4–3. In the following game, Zack Greinke pitched an eight-inning complete game but the Dodgers offense failed to score more than a single run and a solo homer by Justin Upton in the eighth inning gave the Padres a 2–1 win. In the series finale, the Padres jumped out to a 2–0 lead in the fifth but the Dodgers tied it up on a solo homer by Andre Ethier and an RBI double by Adrián González. Pederson made a tough catch on a long line drive by Upton in the ninth to send the game into extra innings where the Dodgers won the game 4–2 on a two-run single by González in the 12th. The team next traveled to Globe Life Park in Arlington, Texas for a short series against the Texas Rangers. Carlos Frías pitched five scoreless innings to start the game, but fell apart in the sixth when the Rangers scored four runs to win the game 4–1. The offense remained lifeless the following day, unable to score against rookie Chi Chi Gonzalez until Justin Turner tied the game up with a two-run homer in the top of the ninth. However, Robinson Chirinos hit a walk-off homer off Josh Ravin in the bottom of the inning and the Rangers swept the brief two-game series with a 3–2 win.

Back at Dodger Stadium, rookie Joey Gallo hit a two-run homer and the Rangers jumped on Kershaw early and went on to win 5–3. Pinch runner Kike Hernández scored on a balk by Keone Kela in the bottom of the ninth as the Dodgers snapped their three-game losing streak with a 1–0 win over the Rangers. Justin Turner had three hits in three at-bats with a homer against the Giants on June 19, but a grand slam by Buster Posey set the Giants up for a 9–5 win. In the next game, the Dodgers got back-to-back first-inning home runs from Joc Pederson and Justin Turner, but it wasn't enough as the Giants won 6–2. The Dodgers finally broke open the offense on June 21, as Yasmani Grandal hit two homers, González and Turner also homered, and the team won 10–2. It was the third straight game Turner homered, the longest streak of his career, and Grandal became the first Dodgers catcher with two home runs and a bunt single in one game since Roy Campanella on August 30, 1955.

The Dodgers went back of the road on June 22 for a series at Wrigley Field against the Chicago Cubs, who hit five home runs off Dodgers starters, including two by rookie Kris Bryant. Joc Pederson homered for the Dodgers in the ninth inning for his 19th of the season, a new Dodgers rookie record for home runs hit before the all-star break, but it wasn't enough as the Dodgers lost 4–2. Greinke's winless streak continued the next day, despite his not allowing a single run in his six innings of work. The Cubs beat the Dodgers 1–0 on a sacrifice fly by Chris Denorfia in the bottom of the 10th inning. A solo homer by Adrián González and a three-run shot by Justin Turner led the Dodgers to a 5–2 win in the following game. The home run was Turner's tenth of the season, giving the Dodgers five players (Pederson, González, Grandal, Guerrero and Turner) with 10 or more home runs before the All-Star break, the first time they accomplished that since the 2000 season (Gary Sheffield, Eric Karros, Todd Hundley, Shawn Green and Kevin Elster). Carlos Frías and the bullpen shut down the Cubs as the Dodgers won 4–0 to earn a split of the four game series. Brett Anderson struck out 10, Scott Van Slyke hit a two-run homer and the Dodgers routed the Miami Marlins 7–1 at Marlins Park on June 26. The brief winning streak came to an end the next day as a pair of costly errors by Ethier and Pederson allowed two unearned runs to score in the first inning. Kershaw struck out nine in seven innings but also lost his third straight decision for the first time in his career as the Dodgers fell to the Marlins 3–2. Zack Greinke pitched another 7 2/3 scoreless innings on June 28, running his scoreless streak to 20 2/3 innings. He also became the first Dodger pitcher to last at least six innings in his first 16 starts of the season since Mike Morgan in 1991. The Dodgers managed to score two runs for a 2–0 win to give him his first win since May 5. The team traveled to Chase Field to close out the month against the Diamondbacks. Bolsinger pitched four scoreless innings but had to leave the game because he was ill with food poisoning. Joc Pederson hit his 20th homer but the bullpen allowed three two-run homers and the Dodgers lost 10–6. Six Dodgers relievers allowed at least two runners to reach base, tying a Dodgers franchise record last set in 1950 and they also tied a franchise record with four relievers allowing at least two runs each. On the more positive side, Pederson's homer was the Dodgers' 100th of the season and a later solo shot by Andre Ethier gave the Dodgers six players with double digit homers before the All-Star break for only the third time in franchise history (1977 and 1979). Howie Kendrick had four hits, including the go-ahead home run in the tenth inning and Yasmani Grandal had four RBI including a homer of his own as the Dodgers wrapped up the month of June with a 6–4 victory over the Diamondbacks. Kenley Jansen walked David Peralta with two outs in the ninth, ending his streak of 27 strikeouts before his first walk of the season, eight shy of the major league record set by Adam Wainwright in 2013.

=== July ===
The Dodgers started the month of July by beating the Diamondbacks 4–3 to end their long road trip. Kiké Hernández was a homer shy of the cycle and Brett Anderson pitched seven strong innings in the win.

The Dodgers returned home from the road trip to play the New York Mets. They lost the opener 2–1 on a sacrifice fly in the ninth inning. Zack Greinke pitched seven scoreless innings on Independence Day, his fourth consecutive start without allowing a run, trailing only Orel Hershiser and Don Drysdale who had six game streaks in 1988 and 1968 respectively. The bullpen allowed some runs but the team held on for a 4–3 win. However, Mets starter Steven Matz stymied the Dodgers offense the next day, combining with reliever Logan Verrett on a three-hit shutout. The Mets routed the Dodgers 8–0. The last-place Philadelphia Phillies came to town next. With Carlos Frías going on the disabled list, the Dodgers went with a bullpen game on July 6, which led to a high scoring game. Howie Kendrick had four hits and former Phillie Jimmy Rollins was two for four and drove in the go-ahead runs in the seventh as the Dodgers won 10–7. Former Dodger Chad Billingsley allowed only two runs and six hits against his former club for his first win since April 10, 2013. The Phillies jumped all over the Dodgers for a 7–2 win. In the next game, Clayton Kershaw struck out 13 while pitching a complete game shutout and A.J. Ellis had three hits including his first home run of the season as the Dodgers won 5–0. Greinke allowed only one hit in eight scoreless innings as the Dodgers won the series finale 6–0. Along with extending his scoreless streak to 35 2/3 innings, Greinke's ERA of 1.39 was the second lowest by a Dodgers pitcher before the All-Star break (trailing only Drysdale's 1.37 from 1968. The Dodgers began their final series before the break with a 3–2 win over the Milwaukee Brewers. Brandon Beachy made his first start since 2013 on July 11, returning to the majors after two Tommy John operations. He allowed three runs on five hits in four innings and a poor performance by the bullpen contributed to the 7–1 loss. A two-run home run by Adrián González in the eighth gave the Dodgers a 4–3 win over the Brewers in the final game before the break.

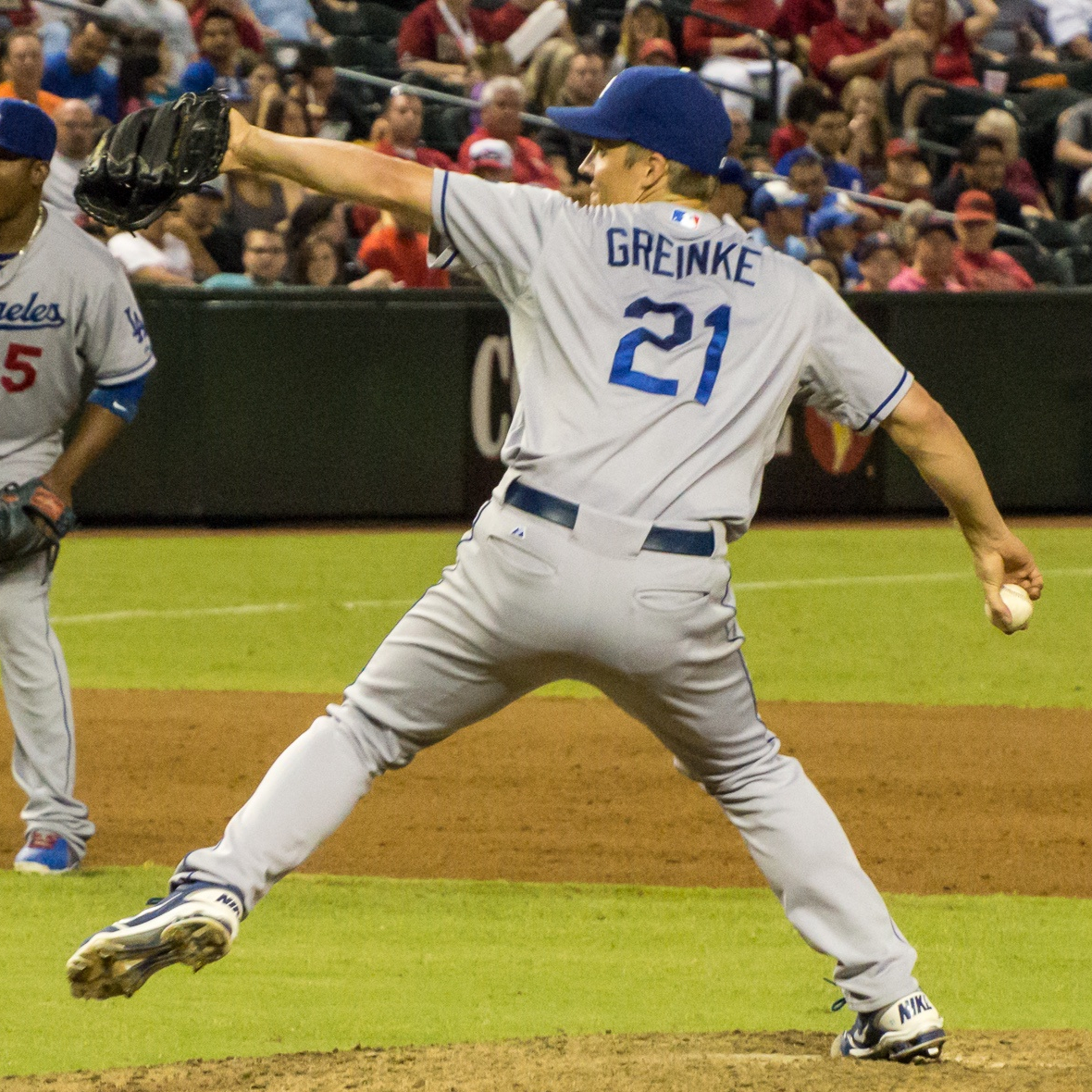
Zack Greinke was the starting pitcher for the National League in the All-Star Game and had six scoreless starts in a row from June 18 to July 19.

The Dodgers had five players selected to participate in the 2015 Major League Baseball All-Star Game: pitchers Zack Greinke and Clayton Kershaw, first baseman Adrián González, catcher Yasmani Grandal and outfielder Joc Pederson. Greinke and Pederson were chosen to start the game and Pederson also participated in the Home Run Derby. Pederson was the first Dodgers rookie position player ever to start in the All-Star game.

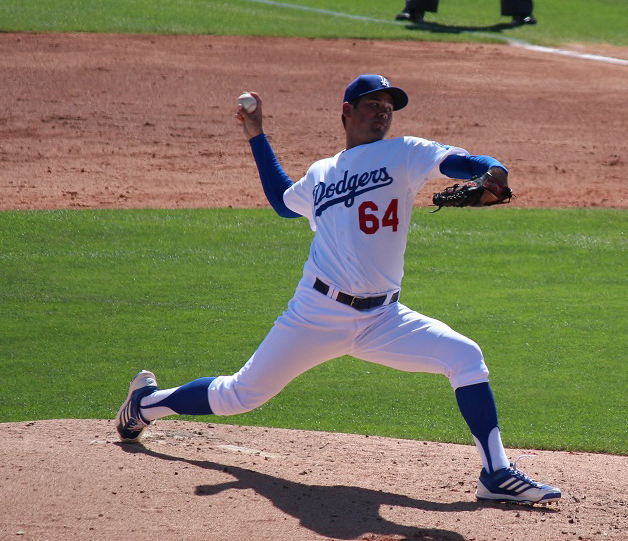
2010 first round draft pick Zach Lee made his major league debut on July 25 against the Mets.

The Dodgers resumed play after the break on July 17 at Nationals Park against the Washington Nationals. The first game was suspended twice because of electrical problems at the park and was eventually halted in the sixth inning and resumed the following day. Matt den Dekker's pinch hit two-run homer in the bottom of the eighth inning wound up being the difference in the 5–3 Nationals win. In the second game, Kershaw struck out a season-high 14 batters in eight shutout innings as the Dodgers won 4–2. He became the first Dodgers starter with back-to-back games of at least 13 strikeouts since Chan Ho Park in 2000 and the first Dodgers pitcher with back-to-back games of double-digit strikeouts and no walks since Dazzy Vance in 1930. Greinke picked up right where he left off in his first start of the second half, allowing only three hits and one walk in eight scoreless innings, while striking out a season-high 11 batters. The Dodgers won 5–0. Combined with the previous start by Kershaw, this was the first time the Dodgers had back-to-back starts of at least eight scoreless innings and double-digit strikeouts since at least 1914. The Dodgers next lost to the Atlanta Braves, 7–5, at Turner Field. Former Dodger Juan Uribe drove in the winning run in the Braves 4–3 win the next day. Mike Bolsinger only allowed one run on three hits in seven innings and retired 14 consecutive batters at one point as the Dodgers avoided the sweep with a 3–1 win in the series finale. Kershaw threw a three-hit complete game shutout against the New York Mets at Citi Field on July 23, while striking out 11. He was the first Dodgers starter with two shutouts in the same month since Carlos Pérez in 1998 and the first pitcher dating back to 1900 to have three straight starts with double-digit strikeouts, no walks and no runs allowed. Ian Thomas made a spot start on July 24 and allowed only one run on three hits in five innings while Justin Turner, Yasiel Puig and Jimmy Rollins homered in the Dodgers 7–2 win. Rollins homer was his 10th of the season, giving the Dodgers seven players with double digit homers for the first time since 2008. The Dodgers 2010 first-round draft pick Zach Lee made his major league debut to start the July 25 game against the Mets, but performed poorly. He allowed seven runs in 4 2/3 innings in the Dodgers 15–2 loss. He was the first Dodgers starting pitcher to allow seven runs in his debut since Johnny Babich in 1934 and the first to allow four runs or more in the first inning of his debut since Frank Wurm in 1944. Greinke's scoreless streak ended at 45 2/3 innings when he allowed two runs to score on July 26 against the Mets. A walk-off single by Juan Uribe, who had been traded to the Mets the day before, gave the Mets a 3–2 win in 10 innings.

Back at Dodger Stadium, the Dodgers lost 2–0 to the Oakland Athletics as Sonny Gray pitched a complete game three hit shutout. The next day, the Dodgers scored five runs in the bottom of the eighth to come from behind and defeat the Athletics 10–7. Greinke allowed two runs in eight innings while striking out eight and Howie Kendrick and Alex Guerrero homered as the Dodgers wrapped up the month of July with a 5–3 win over the Los Angeles Angels of Anaheim.

=== August ===
Clayton Kershaw allowed only two hits in eight scoreless innings against the Angels on August 1, as the Dodgers started the month with a 3–1 victory. Kershaw became the first pitcher with multiple streaks of 37 or more scoreless innings since Luis Tiant in 1968 and 1972. The Dodgers acquired starting pitcher Mat Latos in a deadline day trade with the Miami Marlins and he made his team debut by allowing just one run on four hits in six innings. Andre Ethier hit two homers in the game, including a walk-off two-run blast in the tenth inning as the Dodgers won 5–3 to complete their first three-game sweep of the Angels since 2006.

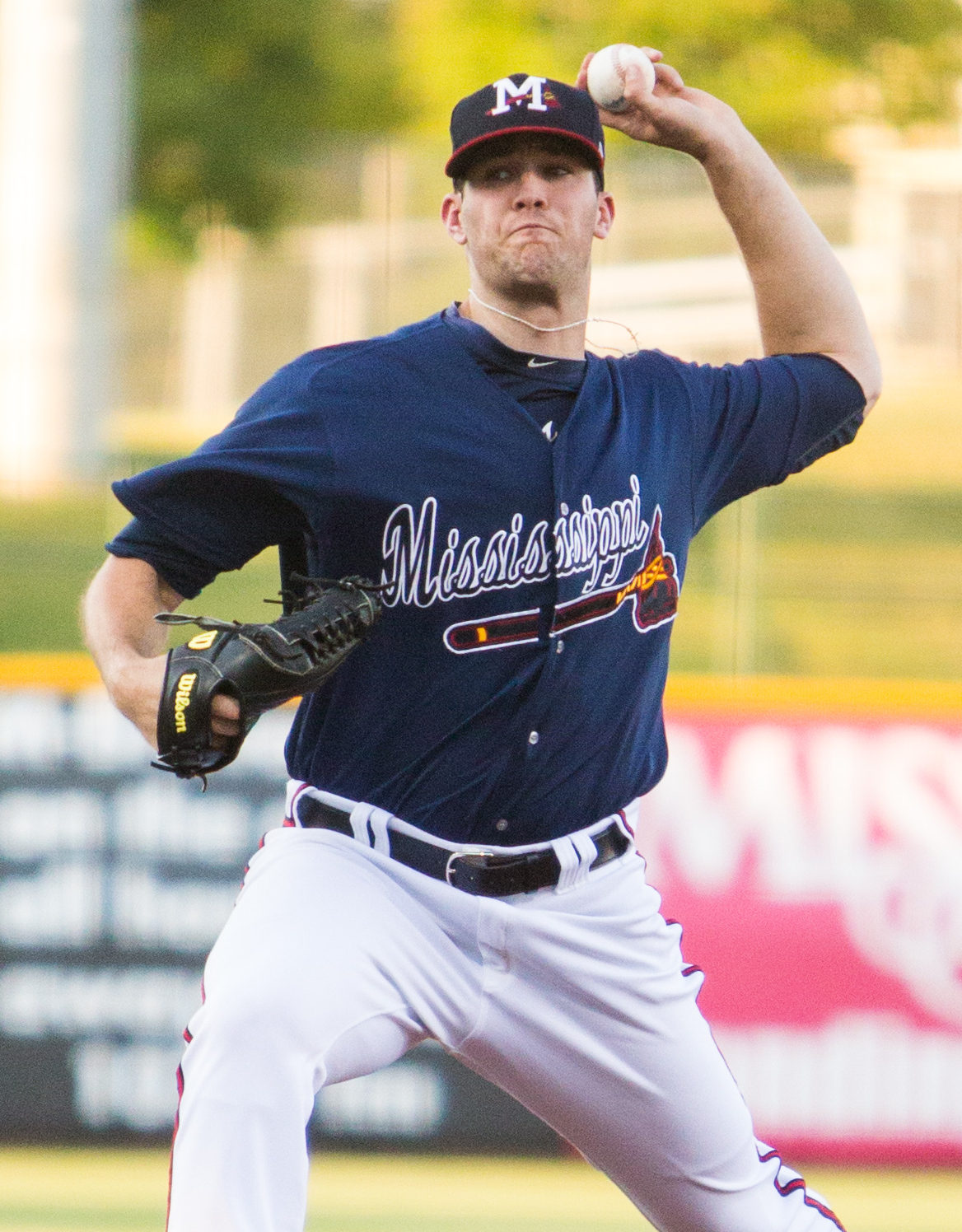
Alex Wood was acquired from the Braves at the trade deadline and joined the Dodgers starting rotation.

Another recent trade acquisition, Alex Wood took the mound for the Dodgers in the opener of a series against the Philadelphia Phillies at Citizens Bank Park. He allowed four runs in 6 1/3 innings and Maikel Franco hit a grand slam home run off of reliever Joel Peralta as the Phillies won 6–2. The next day, Yasiel Puig hit a three-run homer to lead the Dodgers to a 4–3 win. In the series finale, Zack Greinke allowed a season high five runs in the first inning but had three hits, including a home run, as the Dodgers came from behind and won 10–8. A based-loaded walk-off single by Pedro Álvarez in the 10th inning gave the Pittsburgh Pirates a 5–4 win over the Dodgers at PNC Park on August 7. The following day, Mat Latos gave up a three-run home run to opposing starter Francisco Liriano, and the Dodgers couldn't rally against the Pirates bullpen as they lost 6–5. In the final game, the Pirates erupted for nine runs off the Dodgers bullpen in the seventh inning to come from behind and rout the Dodgers 13–6 to sweep the series. Dodger reliever Jim Johnson was the first Dodgers pitcher to allow eight runs in one or fewer innings since Fred Heimach in 1933.

The Washington Nationals scored five runs in the sixth inning off Brett Anderson and pulled away for an 8–3 rout of the Dodgers at Dodger Stadium on August 10. Greinke got back on track in his next start with six scoreless innings while Puig hit a two-run home run and a three-RBI triple to drive in all the Dodgers runs in a 5–0 win. In the following game, Kershaw allowed just three hits over eight scoreless innings in the Dodgers 3–0 win to take the series. He picked up his 200th strikeout in the game, the sixth straight season he had passed that mark. He became the 10th pitcher in MLB history to accomplish that feat and only the second Dodger (after Sandy Koufax). Billy Hamilton had four hits in four at-bats, including a home run, and Brandon Phillips and Eugenio Suárez combined for seven RBIs as the Cincinnati Reds beat up on Mat Latos and the Dodgers 10–3 on August 13. The next day, Adrián González hit a three-run homer and Alex Wood picked up his first win as a Dodger, 5–3. The Dodgers won 8–3 the following day thanks to four home runs. Puig hit his 10th homer, giving the Dodgers eight players in double digit homers on the season, one shy of the club record. Greinke allowed one run in seven innings and also hit a solo homer in the Dodgers 2–1 win over the Reds on August 16.

A.J. Ellis hit a three-run homer to give the Dodgers the lead but the bullpen faltered late and the Dodgers lost 5–4 to the Oakland Athletics at O.co Coliseum on a walk-off double by Billy Butler in the 10th inning. Jesse Chavez allowed just two hits to the Dodgers (including a two-run homer by Jimmy Rollins and the A's finished off the two game series with a 5–2 win. The Dodgers offense was even worse in the next game, as they were no-hit by Mike Fiers of the Houston Astros 3–0, the first no-hitter in the history of Minute Maid Park. The Astros hit two home runs off Greinke to end his string of 11 unbeaten starts the next day, 3–1. Clayton Kershaw allowed only one run in eight innings with ten strikeouts in the series finale. However, the Astros tied the game against Kenley Jansen in the ninth and won, 3–2, on a walk-off homer by Jason Castro in the 10th to send the Dodgers to their fifth straight loss. They headed to Great American Ball Park to open a series against the Reds, where they won 5–1 to end the losing streak. The Dodgers hit three home runs in the fourth inning the next night to beat the Reds 7–4 and they completed the sweep with a 1–0 afternoon win the following day. Greinke pitched seven scoreless innings with nine strikeouts and with his 10th scoreless start of six innings or more matched Kershaw and Don Sutton for second most in team history behind Sandy Koufax (13).

Back home on August 28, Kershaw struck out 14 in eight innings and the Dodgers picked up their fourth straight win, 4–1, over the Chicago Cubs. The Dodgers won again the next day, 5–2, thanks to a two-run single by Andre Ethier in the seventh inning. However, they lost the final game of the series, 2–0, when Kris Bryant hit a two-run homer and Jake Arrieta no-hit them, the second time the Dodgers had been no hit in the last week. The Dodgers finished the month with a 5–4 victory over the San Francisco Giants in 14 innings. Adrián González, who had earlier hit a two-run homer, provided the walk-off hit.

=== September / October ===
September began with a good pitching matchup between Zack Greinke and Giants ace Madison Bumgarner. The Dodgers, thanks to a solo homer by Joc Pederson held on to win the game 2–1. Chase Utley hit his first home run as a Dodger and Clayton Kershaw tied a career high with 15 strikeouts in a 2–1 complete game victory to complete the Dodgers sweep of the Giants.

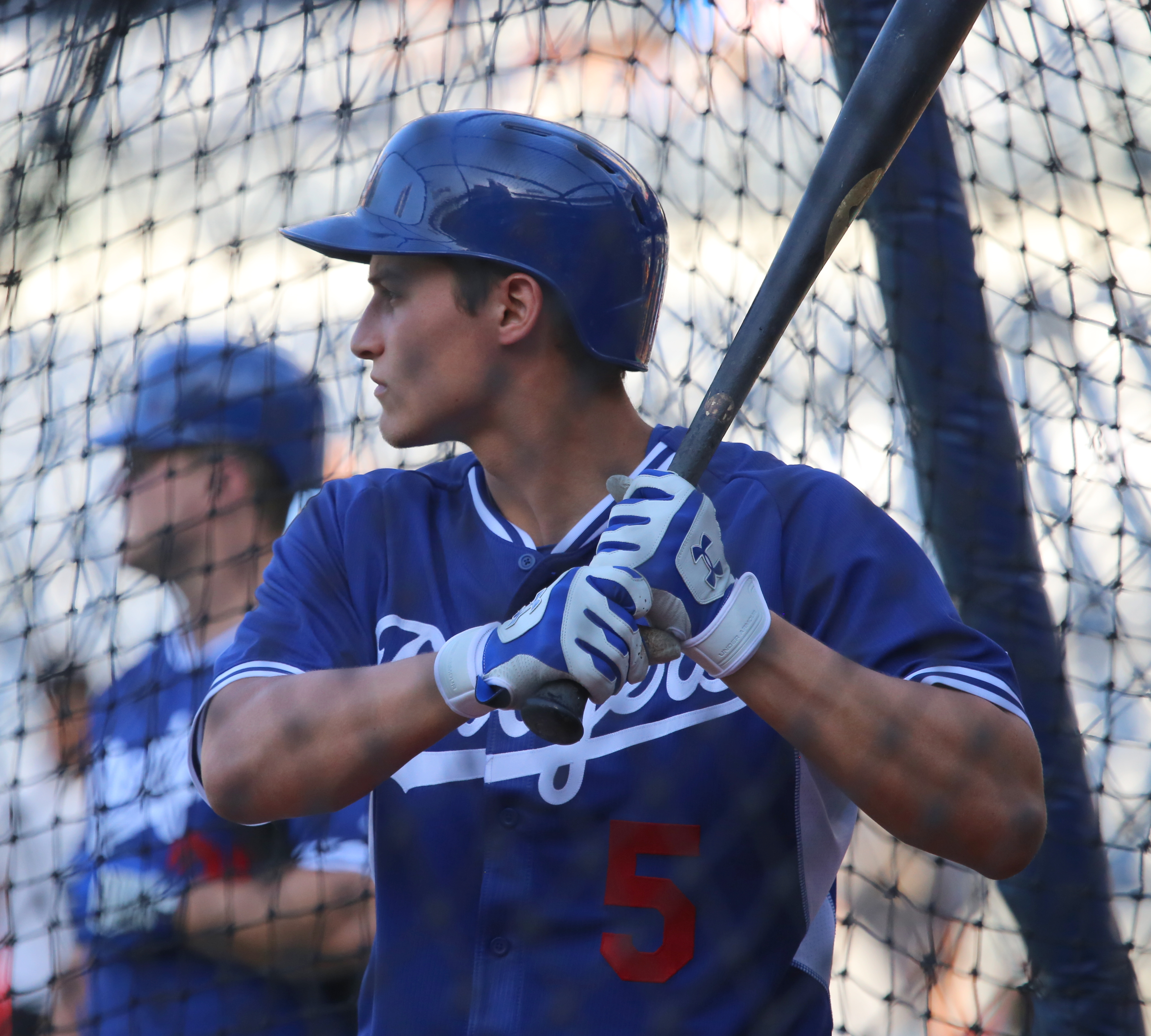
Top Dodgers prospect Corey Seager made his major league debut on September 3.

The traveled to play the San Diego Padres at Petco Park the following day. Top prospect Corey Seager made his Dodgers debut and was two for four with two RBI but Mat Latos and the bullpen struggled as the Dodgers lost 10–7. They then hit five homers on September 4 to beat the Padres 8–4. Alex Wood pitched seven scoreless innings in the Dodgers 2–0 win the following day. The Dodgers capitalized on a three-run error by Padres reliever Nick Vincent to win the final game of the series, 5–1. Scott Van Slyke had four hits, including two doubles, and four RBIs as the Dodgers beat the Los Angeles Angels of Anaheim 7–5 at Angel Stadium on Labor Day. The following day, Kershaw held the Angels to two runs in seven innings and the Dodgers ran their win streak to five games with a 6–4 win. Albert Pujols hit a tie-breaking RBI single in the eighth inning and the Angels won the final game of the series, 3–2. The Dodgers next traveled to Chase Field for a matchup with the Arizona Diamondbacks. Welington Castillo hit a three-run homer in the first inning and the Diamondbacks piled on with six runs in the second to rout the Dodgers 12–4. Seager was 4-for-4 with a walk and his first major league home run in the Dodgers 9–5 win over the Diamondbacks on September 12. Greinke only allowed three hits in eight scoreless innings as the Dodgers took the series finale, 4–3.

Back home, Kershaw followed with a seven inning three hitter while rookie Scott Schebler homered and the Dodgers beat the Colorado Rockies 4–1. The Dodgers lost 5–4 the next day on a solo homer by Nolan Arenado in the 16th inning. The teams set new MLB records by using a combined 58 players in the game and a combined 24 pitchers. Wood allowed only one hit in eight innings and A.J. Ellis homered as the Dodgers won the last game of the series 2–0. Seager hit a two-run home run on September 18 in the Dodgers 6–2 win over the Pittsburgh Pirates. It was the 47th home run by a Dodgers rookie in 2015, setting a new franchise record. An RBI double by Aramis Ramírez in the 8th inning led the Pirates to a 3–2 win over the Dodgers the following night. Gerrit Cole struck out nine in seven innings as the Pirates won the next game, 4–3. Brett Anderson was chased early and the Dodgers were beaten by the Arizona Diamondbacks, 8–4, on September 21. Seager reached base safely for his sixteenth straight start to begin his career, setting a new L.A. Dodger record. The Dodgers lost their fourth straight when the Diamondbacks shut them out 8–0 the following day. The next night, the Dodgers snapped their losing streak, winning 4–1, with Carlos Frías starting in place of Greinke, who was scratched because of a sore calf. The bullpen allowed only one run while Utley and Seager drove in two runs each. Kershaw struck out nine in five innings and Chris Heisey hit a grand slam homer as the Dodgers finished the series with a 6–3 win, thus splitting the series.

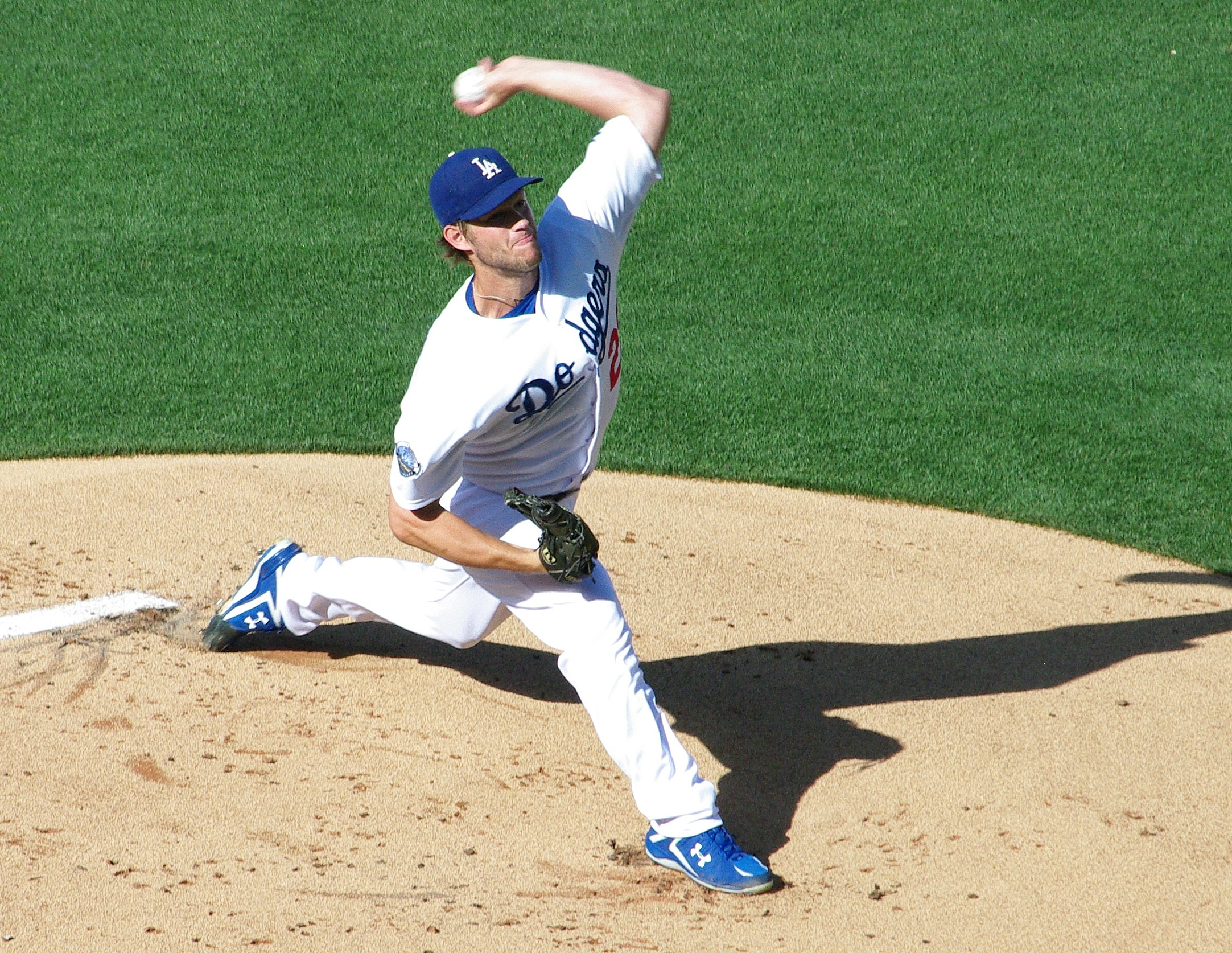
Clayton Kershaw pitched a complete game shutout as the Dodgers clinched the division title over the Giants on September 29.

The Dodgers began their final road trip of the regular season on September 25 at Coors Field against the Colorado Rockies. The Rockies homered three times in the fourth inning off Mike Bolsinger and went on to win 7–4. The Dodgers lost again the next day, 8–6, on a walk-off two-run homer by Carlos González. A three-run homer by Nolan Arenado keyed the Rockies to a 12–5 win and a series sweep of the Dodgers for the first time since the 2007 season. The Dodgers next traveled to AT&T Park only to continue losing, this time 3–2 in 12 innings to the Giants. On September 29, Kershaw struck 13 batters (retiring the last 19 he faced) in a complete game shutout while Justin Ruggiano and A.J. Ellis hit back-to-back homers in the sixth inning off Giants ace Madison Bumgarner as they rolled to an 8–0 win. The Dodgers clinched their third straight National League West Division championship, the first time in franchise history the Dodgers made the playoffs three years in a row. The following day, Mike Leake pitched a two-hit complete game shutout as the Giants beat the Dodgers 5–0 to end the month of September. The Dodgers picked up a series split with a 3–2 win in the final road game of the regular season. Brett Anderson pitched 7 2/3 innings in the game to set a new career high of 180 1/3 innings pitched in a season.

The Dodgers wrapped up the regular season with a three-game series at home against the Padres. Alex Wood allowed two runs on five hits in seven innings in the first game of the series as the Dodgers won 6–2. It was the 90th win of the season, the first time the Dodgers had won 90 or more games in three straight seasons since 1976–1978. Greinke picked up his 19th win of the season in the Dodgers 2–1 win the next day. He picked up his 200th strikeout of the season in the game and also won the National League E.R.A. title. The Dodgers also locked up home field advantage in the division series with the win. In the final game of the regular season, Clayton Kershaw struck out seven in 3 2/3 innings to pass 300 strikeouts on the season and Corey Seager had three hits in three at-bats, including a home run as the Dodgers won 6–3.

=== Game log ===
2015 Game Log
April (13–8)

#	Date	Opponent	Score	Win	Loss	Save	Attendance	Record
1	April 6	Padres	**W** 6–3	**Peralta** (1–0)	Kelley (0–1)	**Hatcher** (1)	53,518	1–0
2	April 7	Padres	L 3–7	Benoit (1–0)	**Hatcher** (0–1)	—	40,356	1–1
3	April 8	Padres	**W** 7–4	**McCarthy** (1–0)	Cashner (0–1)	**Peralta** (1)	52,204	2–1
4	April 10	@ D-backs	L 3–4 (10)	Pérez (1–0)	**Howell** (0–1)	—	27,404	2–2
5	April 11	@ D-backs	L 0–6	Bradley (1–0)	**Kershaw** (0–1)	—	37,636	2–3
6	April 12	@ D-backs	**W** 7–4	**Greinke** (1–0)	Collmenter (0–2)	**Peralta** (2)	29,678	3–3
7	April 13	Mariners	**W** 6–5 (10)	**García** (1–0)	Leone (0–1)	—	42,202	4–3
8	April 14	Mariners	**W** 6–5	**García** (2–0)	Rodney (1–1)	—	43,115	5–3
9	April 15	Mariners	**W** 5–2	**Anderson** (1–0)	Walker (0–2)	—	51,287	6–3
10	April 17	Rockies	**W** 7–3	**Kershaw** (1–1)	Kendrick (1–2)	—	48,950	7–3
11	April 18	Rockies	**W** 6–3	**Greinke** (2–0)	Lyles (1–1)	**Peralta** (3)	45,912	8–3
12	April 19	Rockies	**W** 7–0	**McCarthy** (2–0)	Butler (1–1)	—	44,666	9–3
13	April 21	@ Giants	L 2–6	Lincecum (1–1)	**Anderson (**1–1)	Casilla (5)	41,386	9–4
14	April 22	@ Giants	L 2–3	Casilla (1–0)	**Hatcher** (0–2)	—	42,259	9–5
15	April 23	@ Giants	L 2–3 (10)	Casilla (2–0)	**Nicasio** (0–1)	—	41,240	9–6
16	April 24	@ Padres	**W** 3–0	**Greinke** (3–0)	Cashner (1–3)	**García** (1)	43,055	10–6
17	April 25	@ Padres	**W** 11–8	**McCarthy** (3–0)	Kennedy (0–1)	—	44,454	11–6
18	April 26	@ Padres	L 1–3	Morrow (1–0)	**Baker** (0–1)	Kimbrel (6)	43,256	11–7
19	April 27	Giants	**W** 8–3	**Frías** (1–0)	Lincecum (1–2)	—	46,704	12–7
20	April 28	Giants	L 1–2	Bumgarner (2–1)	**Kershaw** (1–2)	Casilla (6)	50,161	12–8
21	April 29	Giants	**W** 7–3	**Greinke** (4–0)	Vogelsong (0–2)	—	53,285	13–8

May (16–12)

#	Date	Opponent	Score	Win	Loss	Save	Attendance	Record
22	May 1	D-backs	**W** 8–0	**Frías** (2–0)	De La Rosa (2–2)	—	50,164	14–8
23	May 2	D-backs	**W** 6–4	**Nicasio** (1–1)	Marshall (0–1)	**Hatcher** (2)	43,617	15–8
24	May 3	D-backs	**W** 1–0 (13)	**Howell** (1–1)	Marshall (0–2)	—	48,136	16–8
25	May 4	@ Brewers	L 3–4	Blazek (2–0)	**Hatcher** (0–3)	Rodríguez (5)	23,374	16–9
26	May 5	@ Brewers	**W** 8–2	**Greinke** (5–0)	Garza (2–4)	—	23,356	17–9
27	May 6	@ Brewers	L 3–6	Peralta (1–4)	**Wieland** (0–1)	Rodríguez (6)	22,708	17–10
28	May 7	@ Brewers	**W** 14–4	**Frías** (3–0)	Fiers (1–4)	—	28,505	18–10
29	May 8	@ Rockies	**W** 2–1 (5)	**Anderson** (2–1)	Butler (2–3)	—	32,974	19–10
–	May 9	@ Rockies	Postponed (rain) Rescheduled for June 2					
30	May 10	@ Rockies	**W** 9–5	**Báez** (1–0)	Oberg (1–1)	—	30,710	20–10
31	May 11	Marlins	**W** 5–3	**Howell** (2–1)	Cishek (1–3)	—	44,941	21–10
32	May 12	Marlins	**W** 11–1	**Bolsinger** (1–0)	Haren (4–2)	—	49,628	22–10
33	May 13	Marlins	L 4–5	Dyson (2–0)	**Liberatore** (0–1)	Ramos (1)	38,316	22–11
34	May 14	Rockies	L 4–5	Betancourt (1–1)	**García** (2–1)	Axford (4)	42,640	22–12
35	May 15	Rockies	**W** 6–4	**Kershaw** (2–2)	Butler (2–4)	**Nicasio** (1)	46,662	23–12
36	May 16	Rockies	L 1–7	de la Rosa (1–2)	**Greinke** (5–1)	—	48,378	23–13
37	May 17	Rockies	**W** 1–0	**Bolsinger** (2–0)	Kendrick (1–5)	**Jansen** (1)	44,990	24–13
38	May 19	@ Giants	L 0–2	Hudson (2–3)	**Frías** (3–1)	Casilla (10)	41,392	24–14
39	May 20	@ Giants	L 0–4	Lincecum (4–2)	**Anderson** (2–2)	—	41,920	24–15
40	May 21	@ Giants	L 0–4	Bumgarner (5–2)	**Kershaw** (2–3)	—	41,840	24–16
41	May 22	Padres	**W** 2–1	**Hatcher** (1–3)	Benoit (4–2)	**Jansen** (2)	48,514	25–16
42	May 23	Padres	**W** 2–0	**Bolsinger** (3–0)	Kennedy (2–4)	**Jansen** (3)	53,479	26–16
43	May 24	Padres	L 3–11	Shields (6–0)	**Frías** (3–2)	—	50,182	26–17
44	May 25	Braves	**W** 6–3	**Liberatore** (1–1)	Masset (0–1)	**Jansen** (4)	44,680	27–17
45	May 26	Braves	**W** 8–0	**Kershaw** (3–3)	Teherán (4–2)	—	40,667	28–17
46	May 27	Braves	L 2–3	Wood (3–2)	**Hatcher** (1–4)	Grilli (14)	37,837	28–18
47	May 29	@ Cardinals	L 0–3	Lackey (3–3)	**Bolsinger** (3–1)	Rosenthal (14)	44,223	28–19
48	May 30	@ Cardinals	**W** 5–1	**Frías** (4–2)	Wacha (7–1)	—	44,754	29–19
49	May 31	@ Cardinals	L 1–3	Martínez (5–2)	**Anderson** (2–3)	Rosenthal (15)	45,285	29–20

June (15–15)

#	Date	Opponent	Score	Win	Loss	Save	Attendance	Record
50	June 1	@ Rockies	**W** 11–4	**Kershaw** (4–3)	Kendrick (2–7)	—	25,564	30–20
51	June 2	@ Rockies	L 3–6	de la Rosa (2–2)	**Thomas** (0–1)	Axford (10)	21,148	30–21
52	June 2	@ Rockies	**W** 9–8	**Ravin** (1–0)	Betancourt (2–2)	**Jansen** (5)	24,972	31–21
53	June 3	@ Rockies	L 6–7	Axford (1–0)	**García** (2–2)	—	24,575	31–22
54	June 4	Cardinals	L 1–7	Wacha (8–1)	**Frías** (4–3)	—	45,058	31–23
55	June 5	Cardinals	L 1–2	Martínez (6–2)	**Anderson** (2–4)	Rosenthal (18)	44,649	31–24
56	June 6	Cardinals	**W** 2–0	**Kershaw** (5–3)	García (1–3)	**Jansen** (6)	47,655	32–24
57	June 7	Cardinals	L 2–4	Siegrist (3–0)	**Nicasio** (1–2)	Rosenthal (19)	41,500	32–25
58	June 8	D-backs	**W** 9–3	**Bolsinger** (4–1)	De La Rosa (4–3)	—	42,167	33–25
59	June 9	D-backs	**W** 3–1	**Liberatore** (2–1)	Ray (1–1)	**Jansen** (7)	37,738	34–25
60	June 10	D-backs	**W** 7–6	**Jansen** (1–0)	Hudson (1–2)	—	47,174	35–25
61	June 12	@ Padres	**W** 4–3	**García** (3–2)	Thayer (2–1)	**Jansen** (8)	39,037	36–25
62	June 13	@ Padres	L 1–2	Maurer (4–0)	**Greinke** (5–2)	Kimbrel (16)	43,525	36–26
63	June 14	@ Padres	**W** 4–2 (12)	**Ravin** (2–0)	Thayer (2–2)	**Jansen** (9)	40,056	37–26
64	June 15	@ Rangers	L 1–4	Gallardo (6–6)	**Frías** (4–4)	Tolleson (9)	32,248	37–27
65	June 16	@ Rangers	L 2–3	Tolleson (2–1)	**Ravin** (2–1)	—	31,897	37–28
66	June 17	Rangers	L 3–5	Rodríguez (4–2)	**Kershaw** (5–4)	Kela (1)	42,908	37–29
67	June 18	Rangers	**W** 1–0	**Jansen** (2–0)	Kela (4–4)	—	46,977	38–29
68	June 19	Giants	L 5–9	Heston (7–5)	**Bolsinger** (4–2)	Casilla (19)	52,503	38–30
69	June 20	Giants	L 2–6	Hudson (5–6)	**Frías** (4–5)	—	53,123	38–31
70	June 21	Giants	**W** 10–2	**Anderson** (3–4)	Lincecum (7–4)	—	53,509	39–31
71	June 22	@ Cubs	L 2–4	Wood (4–3)	**Kershaw** (5–5)	Motte (2)	35,147	39–32
72	June 23	@ Cubs	L 0–1 (10)	Motte (5–1)	**Peralta** (1–1)	—	36,799	39–33
73	June 24	@ Cubs	**W** 5–2	**Howell** (3–1)	Hendricks (2–4)	**Jansen** (10)	36,653	40–33
74	June 25	@ Cubs	**W** 4–0	**Frías** (5–5)	Lester (4–6)	—	41,498	41–33
75	June 26	@ Marlins	**W** 7–1	**Anderson** (4–4)	Nicolino (1–1)	—	21,957	42–33
76	June 27	@ Marlins	L 2–3	Koehler (6–4)	**Kershaw** (5–6)	Ramos (10)	24,770	42–34
77	June 28	@ Marlins	**W** 2–0	**Greinke** (6–2)	Ureña (1–4)	**Jansen** (11)	25,147	43–34
78	June 29	@ D-backs	L 6–10	Burgos (1–2)	**Báez** (1–1)	—	24,215	43–35
79	June 30	@ D-backs	**W** 6–4 (10)	**Peralta** (2–1)	Hernandez (0–1)	**Jansen** (12)	22,404	44–35

July (14–10)

#	Date	Opponent	Score	Win	Loss	Save	Attendance	Record
80	July 1	@ D-backs	**W** 4–3	**Anderson** (5–4)	Ray (2–4)	**Jansen** (13)	20,277	45–35
81	July 3	Mets	L 1–2	Robles (2–2)	**Jansen** (2–1)	Familia (22)	52,750	45–36
82	July 4	Mets	**W** 4–3	**Greinke** (7–2)	Harvey (7–6)	**Howell** (1)	51,252	46–36
83	July 5	Mets	L 0–8	Matz (2–0)	**Bolsinger** (4–3)	Verrett (1)	40,027	46–37
84	July 6	Phillies	**W** 10–7	**Howell** (4–1)	Gómez (0–2)	**Jansen** (14)	45,180	47–37
85	July 7	Phillies	L 2–7	Billingsley (1–2)	**Anderson** (5–5)	—	46,614	47–38
86	July 8	Phillies	**W** 5–0	**Kershaw** (6–6)	Morgan (1–2)	—	45,135	48–38
87	July 9	Phillies	**W** 6–0	**Greinke** (8–2)	González (3–3)	—	41,290	49–38
88	July 10	Brewers	**W** 3–2	**Tsao** (1–0)	Nelson (6–9)	**Jansen** (15)	44,200	50–38
89	July 11	Brewers	L 1–7	Jungmann (4–1)	**Beachy** (0–1)	—	49,081	50–39
90	July 12	Brewers	**W** 4–3	**Báez** (2–1)	Smith (4–1)	**Jansen** (16)	43,229	51–39
–	July 14	86th All-Star Game	National League vs. American League (Great American Ball Park, Cincinnati)					
–	July 17	@ Nationals	Suspended (light failure) (Note: Three light failures occurred at sold-out Nationals Park during the evening of July 17, the first causing a delay of 1 hour 22 minutes, followed by nine minutes of play before the second failure caused another delay of 40 minutes. When a third failure occurred after another 12 minutes of play, the game was suspended after the completion of five innings with the score Washington 3, Los Angeles 2. Its completion, starting at the top of the sixth inning, was scheduled for July 18, to be followed by the game previously scheduled for July 18. (See Janes, Chelsea, "," washingtonpost.com, July 17, 2015, 11:45 p.m. EDT.)) Completion scheduled for July 18					
91	July 18 (1) (Note: The completion of the game suspended on July 17, resumed at the top of the sixth inning with a score of Washington 3, Los Angeles 2.)	@ Nationals	L 3–5	Janssen (1–2)	**Báez** (2–2)	Storen (28)	40,709 (Note: This reflects the attendance on July 17. Tickets for the suspended July 17 game were not honored for its completion on July 18 or for the game originally scheduled for July 18. The July 18 completion of the July 17 game and the regularly scheduled game on July 18 were played as a single-admission event.)	51–40
92	July 18 (2) (Note: This was the originally scheduled game for July 18, played after the completion of the game suspended on July 17.)	@ Nationals	**W** 4–2	**Kershaw** (7–6)	Fister (3–5)	—	41,426 (Note: The July 18 completion of the July 17 game and the regularly scheduled game on July 18 were played as a single-admission event.)	52–40
93	July 19	@ Nationals	**W** 5–0	**Greinke** (9–2)	Scherzer (10–8)	—	40,293	53–40
94	July 20	@ Braves	L 5–7	Wisler (4–1)	**Liberatore** (2–2)	Johnson (7)	24,072	53–41
95	July 21	@ Braves	L 3–4	Wood (7–6)	**Tsao** (1–1)	Johnson (8)	33,816	53–42
96	July 22	@ Braves	**W** 3–1	**Bolsinger** (5–3)	Teherán (6–5)	**Jansen** (17)	24,112	54–42
97	July 23	@ Mets	**W** 3–0	**Kershaw** (8–6)	Colón (9–9)	—	34,222	55–42
98	July 24	@ Mets	**W** 7–2	**Thomas** (1–1)	Niese (5–9)	—	36,066	56–42
99	July 25	@ Mets	L 2–15	Harvey (9–7)	**Lee** (0–1)	—	39,744	56–43
100	July 26	@ Mets	L 2–3 (10)	Mejía (1–0)	**Nicasio** (1–3)	—	36,093	56–44
101	July 28	Athletics	L 0–2	Gray (11–4)	**Anderson** (5–6)	—	50,182	56–45
102	July 29	Athletics	**W** 10–7	**Báez** (3–2)	Pomeranz (4–4)	—	51,788	57–45
103	July 31	Angels	**W** 5–3	**Greinke** (10–2)	Santiago (7–5)	**Jansen** (18)	53,380	58–45

August (15–12)

#	Date	Opponent	Score	Win	Loss	Save	Attendance	Record
104	August 1	Angels	**W** 3–1	**Kershaw** (9–6)	Heaney (5–1)	**Jansen** (19)	52,979	59–45
105	August 2	Angels	**W** 5–3 (10)	**Báez** (4–2)	Rucinski (0–2)	—	52,116	60–45
106	August 4	@ Phillies	L 2–6	Gómez (1–2)	**Wood** (7–7)	Giles (3)	28,733	60–46
107	August 5	@ Phillies	**W** 4–3	**Anderson** (6–6)	Harang (5–12)	**Jansen** (20)	26,197	61–46
108	August 6	@ Phillies	**W** 10–8	**Greinke** (11–2)	Buchanan (2–6)	**Jansen** (21)	27,839	62–46
109	August 7	@ Pirates	L 4–5 (10)	Bastardo (4–1)	**Johnson** (2–4)	—	39,404	62–47
110	August 8	@ Pirates	L 5–6	Blanton (3–2)	**Latos** (4–8)	Melancon (35)	38,981	62–48
111	August 9	@ Pirates	L 6–13	Caminero (2–1)	**Johnson** (2–5)	—	37,094	62–49
112	August 10	Nationals	L 3–8	González (9–4)	**Anderson** (6–7)	—	45,722	62–50
113	August 11	Nationals	**W** 5–0	**Greinke** (12–2)	Ross (3–4)	—	49,384	63–50
114	August 12	Nationals	**W** 3–0	**Kershaw** (10–6)	Zimmermann (8–8)	**Jansen** (22)	44,911	64–50
115	August 13	Reds	L 3–10	Sampson (2–1)	**Latos** (4–9)	—	47,216	64–51
116	August 14	Reds	**W** 5–3	**Wood** (8–7)	Lamb (0–1)	**Jansen** (23)	43,407	65–51
117	August 15	Reds	**W** 8–3	**Anderson** (7–7)	Holmberg (1–2)	—	46,807	66–51
118	August 16	Reds	**W** 2–1	**Greinke** (13–2)	DeSclafani (7–8)	**Jansen** (24)	47,388	67–51
119	August 18	@ Athletics	L 4–5 (10)	Abad (2–2)	**García** (3–3)	—	35,067	67–52
120	August 19	@ Athletics	L 2–5	Chavez (7–12)	**Wood** (8–8)	Pomeranz (2)	26,122	67–53
121	August 21	@ Astros	L 0–3	Fiers (6–9)	**Anderson** (7–8)	—	33,833	67–54
122	August 22	@ Astros	L 1–3	Kazmir (7–8)	**Greinke** (13–3)	Gregerson (24)	39,999	67–55
123	August 23	@ Astros	L 2–3 (10)	Gregerson (7–2)	**Hatcher** (1–5)	—	28,665	67–56
124	August 25	@ Reds	**W** 5–1	**Wood** (9–8)	Lamb (0–2)	—	22,783	68–56
125	August 26	@ Reds	**W** 7–4	**Anderson** (8–8)	Holmberg (1–4)	**Jansen** (25)	17,712	69–56
126	August 27	@ Reds	**W** 1–0	**Greinke** (14–3)	DeSclafani (7–10)	**Johnson** (10)	25,529	70–56
127	August 28	Cubs	**W** 4–1	**Kershaw** (11–6)	Hammel (7–6)	**Jansen** (26)	44,874	71–56
128	August 29	Cubs	**W** 5–2	**Howell** (5–1)	Lester (8–10)	**Jansen** (27)	51,697	72–56
129	August 30	Cubs	L 0–2	Arrieta (17–6)	**Wood** (9–9)	—	46,679	72–57
130	August 31	Giants	**W** 5–4 (14)	**Hatcher** (2–5)	Broadway (0–1)	—	40,851	73–57

September (15–13)

#	Date	Opponent	Score	Win	Loss	Save	Attendance	Record
131	September 1	Giants	**W** 2–1	**Greinke** (15–3)	Bumgarner (16–7)	**Jansen** (28)	48,060	74–57
132	September 2	Giants	**W** 2–1	**Kershaw** (12–6)	Leake (9–7)	—	41,648	75–57
133	September 3	@ Padres	L 7–10	Quackenbush (3–2)	**Johnson** (2–6)	Benoit (2)	33,505	75–58
134	September 4	@ Padres	**W** 8–4	**Bolsinger** (6–3)	Mateo (1–1)	—	33,025	76–58
135	September 5	@ Padres	**W** 2–0	**Wood** (10–9)	Ross (10–10)	**Jansen** (29)	43,536	77–58
136	September 6	@ Padres	**W** 5–1	**Anderson** (9–8)	Cashner (5–14)	—	37,685	78–58
137	September 7	@ Angels	**W** 7–5	**Greinke** (16–3)	Salas (3–2)	**Jansen** (30)	44,488	79–58
138	September 8	@ Angels	**W** 6–4	**Kershaw** (13–6)	Heaney (6–3)	**Jansen** (31)	41,086	80–58
139	September 9	@ Angels	L 2–3	Álvarez (4–3)	**Avilán** (2–5)	Street (33)	42,799	80–59
140	September 11	@ D-backs	L 4–12	Ray (4–11)	**Wood** (10–10)	—	35,615	80–60
141	September 12	@ D-backs	**W** 9–5	**Howell** (6–1)	De La Rosa (12–8)	—	42,517	81–60
142	September 13	@ D-backs	**W** 4–3	**Greinke** (17–3)	Corbin (5–4)	—	36,501	82–60
143	September 14	Rockies	**W** 4–1	**Kershaw** (14–6)	Gray (0–1)	**Hatcher** (3)	43,731	83–60
144	September 15	Rockies	L 4–5 (16)	Hale (4–5)	**Latos** (4–10)	Germen (1)	45,311	83–61
145	September 16	Rockies	**W** 2–0	**Wood** (11–10)	de la Rosa (9–7)	**Jansen** (32)	45,906	84–61
146	September 18	Pirates	**W** 6–2	**Greinke** (18–3)	Locke (8–11)	—	49,529	85–61
147	September 19	Pirates	L 2–3	Liriano (11–7)	**Kershaw** (14–7)	Melancon (47)	49,441	85–62
148	September 20	Pirates	L 3–4	Cole (17–8)	**Bolsinger** (6–4)	Melancon (48)	47,483	85–63
149	September 21	D-backs	L 4–8	Chacín (1–1)	**Anderson** (9–9)	—	38,791	85–64
150	September 22	D-backs	L 0–8	Ray (5–12)	**Wood** (11–11)	—	41,419	85–65
151	September 23	D-backs	**W** 4–1	**Hatcher** (3–5)	Hernandez (1–5)	**Jansen** (33)	46,364	86–65
152	September 24	D-backs	**W** 6–3	**Kershaw** (15–7)	Corbin (6–5)	**Jansen** (34)	38,234	87–65
153	September 25	@ Rockies	L 4–7	Hale (5–5)	**Bolsinger** (6–5)	Axford (25)	38,485	87–66
154	September 26	@ Rockies	L 6–8	Miller (3–2)	**García** (3–4)	—	40,322	87–67
155	September 27	@ Rockies	L 5–12	Rusin (6–9)	**Wood** (11–12)	—	32,870	87–68
156	September 28	@ Giants	L 2–3 (12)	Strickland (3–3)	**García** (3–5)	—	41,341	87–69
157	September 29	@ Giants	**W** 8–0	**Kershaw** (16–7)	Bumgarner (18–9)	—	41,862	88–69
158	September 30	@ Giants	L 0–5	Leake (11–10)	**Bolsinger** (6–6)	—	41,112	88–70

October (4–0)

#	Date	Opponent	Score	Win	Loss	Save	Attendance	Record
159	October 1	@ Giants	**W** 3–2	**Anderson** (10–9)	Hudson (8–9)	**Jansen** (35)	41,027	89–70
160	October 2	Padres	**W** 6–2	**Wood** (12–12)	Kelly (0–2)	—	45,564	90–70
161	October 3	Padres	**W** 2–1	**Greinke** (19–3)	Erlin (8–10)	**Jansen** (36)	52,352	91–70
162	October 4	Padres	**W** 6–3	**Peralta** (3–1)	Garcés (0–1)	**Hatcher** (4)	42,863	92–70

Legend: = Win = Loss = Postponement
Bold = Dodgers team member

== Postseason ==
=== Postseason Game log ===
2015 Postseason (2–3)
National League Division Series (2–3)

Game	Date	Opponent	Score	Win	Loss	Save	Attendance	Series
1	October 9	Mets	L 1–3	deGrom (1–0)	Kershaw (0–1)	Familia (1)	54,428	0–1
2	October 10	Mets	W 5–2	Greinke (1–0)	Syndergaard (0–1)	Jansen (1)	54,455	1–1
3	October 12	@ Mets	L 7–13	Harvey (1–0)	Anderson (0–1)	—	44,278	1–2
4	October 13	@ Mets	W 3–1	Kershaw (1–1)	Matz (0–1)	Jansen (2)	44,183	2–2
5	October 15	Mets	L 2–3	deGrom (2–0)	Greinke (1–1)	Familia (2)	54,602	2–3

=== National League Division Series ===
The Dodgers took on the New York Mets in the Division Series. Clayton Kershaw struck out 11 batters in six innings while allowing only a solo homer by Daniel Murphy but he ran out of gas in the seventh, walking the bases loaded before Pedro Báez came into the game and allowed a couple of runs to score. Jacob deGrom struck out a Mets post-season record 13 batters (tying Tom Seaver in the 1973 National League Championship Series) and held the Dodgers scoreless in his seven innings of work as the Mets took game one 3–1. It was the first game in MLB playoff history where both starters struck out 11 or more batters and only the second ever with both having double digit strikeouts (along with game five of the 1944 World Series). A.J. Ellis singled in the game, extending his post-season hitting streak to 11 games, tying Carl Crawford for the franchise record.

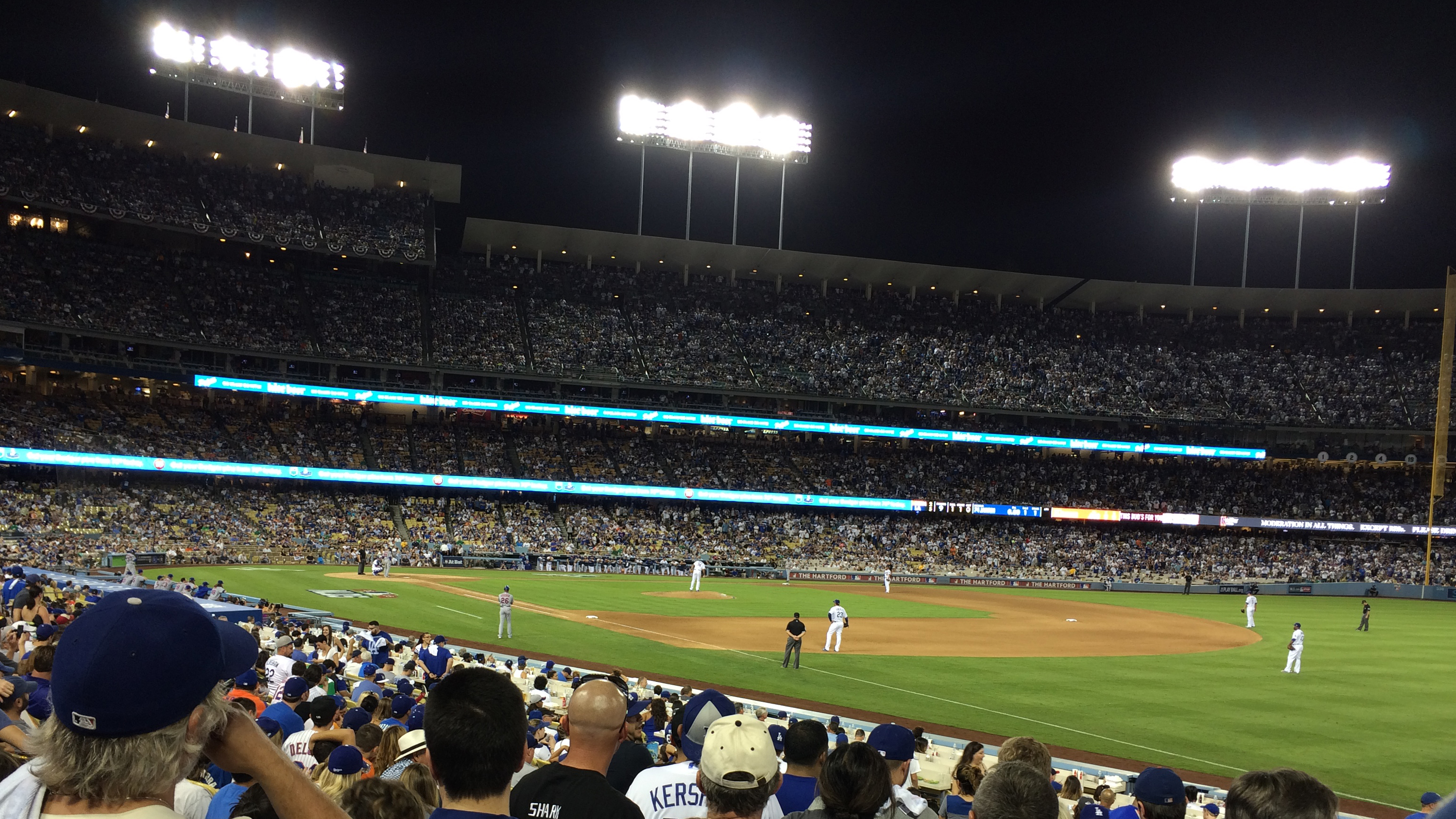
Kenley Jansen on the mound in game 2 of the National League Division Series

In the second game, Zack Greinke allowed two solo homers in the second but went seven innings with only the two runs. The Dodgers came from behind with four runs in the seventh to win the game 5–2 and even the series up. Chase Utley was suspended for games three and four of the series as a result of a hard slide he performed in game two that led to a season-ending injury for Mets shortstop Rubén Tejada.

The series switched to Citi Field in New York for game three. A three-run single by Yasmani Grandal gave the Dodgers a quick 3–0 lead but Brett Anderson performed poorly allowing a bases clearing double by Curtis Granderson and a homer by Travis d'Arnaud. Alex Wood subsequently gave up a three-run homer to Yoenis Céspedes and the Dodgers were blown out 13–7.

In Game four, pitching on three days rest, Kershaw allowed only three hits over seven innings and Kenley Jansen picked up a four out save as the Dodgers evened up the series with a 3–1 win. The win snapped a seven-game road playoff losing streak for the Dodgers and was the first round elimination game they had won since the 1981 National League Championship Series. Ellis passed Crawford with his 12th consecutive playoff game with a hit, a new franchise record

In the decisive final game of the series, Daniel Murphy hit his third home run of the series, a solo shot in the sixth inning, to lead the Mets to a 3–2 victory and the series win.

=== Postseason Rosters ===
Playoff Rosters
National League Division Series

- Pitchers: 21 Zack Greinke 22 Clayton Kershaw 35 Brett Anderson 41 Chris Hatcher 43 Luis Avilán 52 Pedro Báez 56 J. P. Howell 57 Alex Wood 62 Joel Peralta 63 Yimi García 74 Kenley Jansen
- Catchers: 9 Yasmani Grandal 17 A. J. Ellis
- Infielders: 5 Corey Seager 10 Justin Turner 11 Jimmy Rollins 23 Adrián González 26 Chase Utley 47 Howie Kendrick
- Outfielders: 3 Carl Crawford 14 Enrique Hernández 16 Andre Ethier 27 Justin Ruggiano 31 Joc Pederson 66 Yasiel Puig

== Roster ==
2015 Los Angeles Dodgers
Roster
Pitchers: 35 Brett Anderson; 43 Luis Avilán; 52 Pedro Báez; 30 Scott Baker; 37 Brandon Beachy; 46 Mike Bolsinger; 64 Daniel Coulombe; 77 Carlos Frías; 63 Yimi García; 21 Zack Greinke; 41 Chris Hatcher; 56 J. P. Howell; 54 David Huff; 74 Kenley Jansen; 54 Jim Johnson; 55 Mat Latos; 51 Zach Lee; 36 Adam Liberatore; 22 Clayton Kershaw; 38 Brandon McCarthy; 12 Juan Nicasio; 62 Joel Peralta; 71 Josh Ravin; 75 Paco Rodriguez; 26 Sergio Santos; 59 Eric Surkamp; 58 Ian Thomas; 44 Chin-hui Tsao; 76 Matt West; 45 Joe Wieland; 57 Alex Wood	Catchers: 65 Austin Barnes; 17 A. J. Ellis; 9 Yasmani Grandal; Infielders: 6 Darwin Barney; 5 Alberto Callaspo; 23 Adrián González; 47 Howie Kendrick; 18 José Peraza; 11 Jimmy Rollins; 5 Corey Seager; 59 Ronald Torreyes; 10 Justin Turner; 5 Juan Uribe; 26 Chase Utley	Outfielders: 3 Carl Crawford; 16 Andre Ethier; 7 Alex Guerrero; 28 Chris Heisey; 14 Enrique Hernández; 31 Joc Pederson; 66 Yasiel Puig; 27 Justin Ruggiano; 55,30 Scott Schebler; 33 Scott Van Slyke	Manager: 8 Don Mattingly; Coaches: 49 Lorenzo Bundy (third base)(outfield); 82 Steve Cilladi (bullpen catcher); 50 Chuck Crim (bullpen); 85 Rob Flippo (bullpen catcher); 40 Rick Honeycutt (pitching); 43 Ken Howell (assistant pitching); 15 Davey Lopes (first base); 25 Mark McGwire (hitting); 48 Ron Roenicke (third base); 13 John Valentin (assistant hitting); 29 Tim Wallach (bench); 7 Steve Yeager (catching)

== Player stats ==
=== Batting ===
List does not include pitchers. Stats in bold are the team leaders.

Note: G = Games played; AB = At bats; R = Runs; H = Hits; 2B = Doubles; 3B = Triples; HR = Home runs; RBI = Runs batted in; BB = Walks; SO = Strikeouts; SB = Stolen bases; Avg. = Batting average; OBP = On base percentage; SLG = Slugging; OPS = On Base + Slugging percentage

Player	G	AB	R	H	2B	3B	HR	RBI	BB	SO	SB	AVG	OBP	SLG	OPS
Adrián González	**156**	**571**	**76**	**157**	**33**	0	**28**	**90**	62	107	0	**.275**	**.350**	**.480**	**.830**
Jimmy Rollins	144	517	71	116	24	3	13	41	44	86	**12**	.224	.285	.358	.643
Joc Pederson	151	480	67	101	19	1	26	54	**92**	**170**	4	.210	.346	.417	.763
Howie Kendrick	117	464	64	137	22	2	9	54	27	82	6	.295	.336	.409	.746
Andre Ethier	142	395	54	116	20	**7**	14	53	43	75	2	.294	.366	.486	.852
Justin Turner	126	385	55	113	26	1	16	60	36	71	5	.294	.370	.491	.861
Yasmani Grandal	115	355	43	83	12	0	16	47	65	92	0	.234	.353	.403	.756
Yasiel Puig	79	282	30	72	12	3	11	38	26	66	3	.255	.322	.436	.758
Scott Van Slyke	96	222	19	53	14	0	6	30	23	62	3	.239	.317	.383	.700
Alex Guerrero	106	219	25	51	9	1	11	36	7	57	1	.233	.261	.434	.695
Enrique Hernandez	76	202	24	62	12	2	7	22	11	46	0	.307	.346	.490	.836
Carl Crawford	69	181	19	48	9	2	4	16	10	41	10	.265	.304	.403	.707
A. J. Ellis	63	181	24	43	9	0	7	21	32	38	0	.238	.355	.403	.758
Chase Utley	34	124	14	25	9	1	3	9	10	29	1	.202	.291	.363	.654
Alberto Callaspo	60	123	8	32	5	0	0	7	14	24	0	.260	.336	.301	.637
Corey Seager	27	98	17	33	8	1	4	17	14	19	2	.337	.425	.561	.986
Juan Uribe	29	81	6	20	2	0	1	6	5	9	1	.247	.287	.309	.596
Chris Heisey	33	55	8	10	2	0	2	9	15	17	0	.182	.347	.327	.674
Justin Ruggiano	21	55	12	16	4	1	4	12	3	14	2	.291	.350	.618	.968
Scott Schebler	19	36	6	9	0	0	3	4	3	13	2	.250	.325	.500	.825
Austin Barnes	20	29	4	6	2	0	0	1	6	6	1	.207	.361	.276	.637
José Peraza	7	22	3	4	1	1	0	1	2	2	3	.182	.250	.318	.568
Ronald Torreyes	8	6	1	2	1	0	0	1	1	1	0	.333	.333	.333	.667
Darwin Barney	2	4	0	0	0	0	0	0	0	0	0	.000	.000	.000	.000
Non-Pitcher Totals	162	5087	650	1309	255	26	185	629	551	1127	58	.257	.335	.427	.762
**Team totals**	**162**	**5385**	**667**	**1346**	**263**	**26**	**187**	**638**	**563**	**1258**	**59**	**.250**	**.326**	**.413**	**.739**

=== Pitching ===
Stats in bold are the team leaders.

Note: W = Wins; L = Losses; ERA = Earned run average; G = Games pitched; GS = Games started; SV = Saves; IP = Innings pitched; H = Hits allowed; R = Runs allowed; ER = Earned runs allowed; BB = Walks allowed; K = Strikeouts

Player	W	L	ERA	G	GS	SV	IP	H	R	ER	BB	K
Clayton Kershaw	16	7	2.13	33	**33**	0	**232.2**	163	62	55	42	**301**
Zack Greinke	**19**	3	**1.66**	32	32	0	222.2	148	43	41	40	200
Brett Anderson	10	**9**	3.69	31	31	0	180.1	**194**	**82**	**74**	**46**	116
Mike Bolsinger	6	6	3.62	21	21	0	109.1	104	49	44	45	98
Carlos Frías	5	5	4.06	17	13	0	77.2	88	38	35	26	43
Alex Wood	5	6	4.35	12	12	0	70.1	66	36	34	23	49
Juan Nicasio	1	3	3.86	53	1	1	58.1	59	25	25	32	65
Yimi García	3	5	3.34	59	1	1	56.2	44	23	21	10	68
Kenley Jansen	2	1	2.41	54	0	**36**	52.1	33	14	14	8	80
Pedro Báez	4	2	3.35	52	0	0	51.0	47	22	19	11	60
J. P. Howell	6	1	1.43	**65**	0	1	44.0	47	9	7	14	39
Chris Hatcher	3	5	3.69	49	0	4	39.0	35	19	16	13	45
Adam Liberatore	2	2	4.25	39	0	0	29.2	26	14	14	9	29
Joel Peralta	3	1	4.34	33	0	3	29.0	28	14	14	8	24
Mat Latos	0	3	6.66	6	5	0	24.1	31	19	18	6	18
Brandon McCarthy	3	0	5.87	4	4	0	23.0	24	15	15	4	29
Jim Johnson	0	3	10.13	23	0	1	18.2	32	22	21	6	17
Ian Thomas	1	1	4.00	9	1	0	18.0	16	8	8	6	18
Luis Avilán	0	1	5.17	23	0	0	15.2	13	9	9	5	18
Sergio Santos	0	0	4.73	12	0	0	13.1	13	7	7	7	15
Scott Baker	0	1	5.73	2	2	0	11.0	11	7	7	3	8
Paco Rodriguez	0	0	2.61	18	0	0	10.1	10	3	3	3	8
Josh Ravin	2	1	6.75	9	0	0	9.1	13	7	7	4	12
Joe Wieland	0	1	8.31	2	2	0	8.2	10	8	8	5	4
Daniel Coulombe	0	0	7.56	5	0	0	8.1	9	7	7	6	7
Brandon Beachy	0	1	7.88	2	2	0	8.0	10	7	7	6	5
Chin-hui Tsao	1	1	10.29	5	0	0	7.0	15	9	8	3	7
David Huff	0	0	9.00	3	1	0	6.0	11	6	6	1	4
Zach Lee	0	1	13.50	1	1	0	4.2	11	7	7	1	3
Eric Surkamp	0	0	10.80	1	0	0	3.1	4	4	4	1	4
Matt West	0	0	0.00	2	0	0	3.0	2	0	0	1	2
**Team totals**	**92**	**70**	**3.44**	**162**	**162**	**47**	**1445.2**	**1317**	**595**	**553**	**395**	**1396**

== Awards and honors ==
Recipient	Award	Date awarded	Ref.
Adrián González	National League Player of the Week (April 5–12)	April 13, 2015	
Adrián González	National League Player of the Month (April)	May 4, 2015	
Alex Guerrero	National League Rookie of the Month (April)	May 4, 2015	
Clayton Kershaw	National League Player of the Week (June 1–7)	June 8, 2015	
Adrián González	All-Star	July 6, 2015	
Yasmani Grandal	All-Star	July 6, 2015	
Zack Greinke	All-Star	July 6, 2015	
Joc Pederson	All-Star	July 6, 2015	
Clayton Kershaw	All-Star	July 12, 2015	
Zack Greinke	National League Player of the Week (July 13–19)	July 20, 2015	
Clayton Kershaw	National League Player of the Week (July 13–19)	July 20, 2015	
Clayton Kershaw	National League Pitcher of the Month (July)	July 20, 2015	
Zack Greinke	Roy Campanella Award	September 30, 2015	
Joc Pederson	Baseball America All-Rookie team	October 9, 2015	
Zack Greinke	Sporting News National League All-Star Team	October 28, 2015	
Zack Greinke	Players Choice Outstanding NL Pitcher	November 9, 2015	
Zack Greinke	Gold Glove Award	November 10, 2015	

== Transactions ==
=== April ===
- On April 5, placed RHP Kenley Jansen on the 15-day disabled list, retroactive to March 27, with a fifth metatarsal injury; placed RHP Brandon League on the 15-day disabled list, retroactive to March 27, with a right shoulder impingement; placed LHP Hyun-jin Ryu on the 15-day disabled list, retroactive to March 27, with left shoulder impingement.
- On April 9, acquired RHP Ryan Webb, minor league C Brian Ward and a competitive balance draft pick from the Baltimore Orioles in exchange for minor leaguers Chris O'Brien and Ben Rowen.
- On April 12, outrighted RHP Ryan Webb to AAA Oklahoma City.
- On April 14, optioned IF Darwin Barney to AAA Oklahoma City and purchased the contract of LHP David Huff from AAA Oklahoma City.
- On April 15, designated LHP David Huff for assignment and recalled RHP Carlos Frías from AAA Oklahoma City. Claimed LHP Ryan Dennick off waivers from the Cincinnati Reds and optioned him to AA Tulsa.
- On April 16, optioned RHP Carlos Frías to AAA Oklahoma City.
- On April 17, designated LHP Ryan Dennick for assignment and claimed RHP Daniel Corcino off waivers from the Cincinnati Reds. Assigned Corcino to AA Tulsa. Recalled LHP Adam Liberatore from AAA Oklahoma City.
- On April 22, optioned LHP Adam Liberatore to AAA Oklahoma City, recalled OF Chris Heisey from AAA Oklahoma City, acquired LHP Xavier Cedeño from the Washington Nationals in exchange for cash considerations, and designated RHP Daniel Corcino for assignment.
- On April 23, optioned OF Chris Heisey to AAA Oklahoma City and recalled RHP Mike Bolsinger from AAA Oklahoma City.
- On April 24, optioned RHP Mike Bolsinger to AAA Oklahoma City, designated LHP Xavier Cedeño for assignment and purchased the contract of RHP Sergio Santos from AAA Oklahoma City.
- On April 26, placed RHP Joel Peralta on the 15-day disabled list, retroactive to April 24, with right neck strain, placed OF Yasiel Puig on the 15-day disabled list, retroactive to April 25, with a strained left hamstring, transferred RHP Brandon League from the 15-day disabled list to the 60-day disabled list, recalled RHP Carlos Frías from AAA Oklahoma City and purchased the contract of RHP Scott Baker from AAA Oklahoma City.
- On April 27, placed RHP Brandon McCarthy on the 15-day disabled list with a torn ulnar collateral ligament in his right elbow and recalled LHP Adam Liberatore from AAA Oklahoma City.
- On April 28, placed OF Carl Crawford on the 15-day disabled list with a torn oblique muscle and recalled IF/OF Kike Hernández from AAA Oklahoma City.
- On April 30, transferred RHP Brandon McCarthy from the 15-day disabled list to the 60-day disabled list and claimed RHP Eury De La Rosa off waivers from the Oakland Athletics. Optioned De La Rosa to AAA Oklahoma City.

=== May ===
- On May 3, acquired 1B Andy Wilkins from the Toronto Blue Jays for cash considerations and designated RHP Scott Baker for assignment. Optioned Wilkins to AAA Oklahoma City.
- On May 4, recalled LHP Daniel Coulombe from AAA Oklahoma City, acquired RHP Matt West from the Toronto Blue Jays for cash considerations and transferred LHP Hyun-jin Ryu from the 15-day disabled list to the 60-day disabled list. Optioned West to AA Tulsa.
- On May 6, recalled RHP Joe Wieland from AAA Oklahoma City and optioned LHP Daniel Coulombe to AAA Oklahoma City.
- On May 7, recalled OF Chris Heisey from AAA Oklahoma City and optioned RHP Joe Wieland to AAA Oklahoma City.
- On May 12, recalled RHP Mike Bolsinger from AAA Oklahoma City and optioned OF Chris Heisey to AAA Oklahoma City.
- On May 14, placed RHP Pedro Báez on the 15-day disabled list with a strained right pectoral muscle and recalled LHP Daniel Coulombe from AAA Oklahoma City.
- On May 15, activated RHP Kenley Jansen from the 15-day disabled list and optioned LHP Daniel Coulombe to AAA Oklahoma City.
- On May 19, signed IF Héctor Olivera to a six-year, $65 million, contract and designated LHP Eury De La Rosa for assignment.
- On May 23, placed C Yasmani Grandal on the 7-day concussion list, and recalled C Austin Barnes from AAA Oklahoma City.
- On May 27, acquired IF Alberto Callaspo, LHP Ian Thomas, LHP Eric Stults and RHP Juan Jaime from the Atlanta Braves in exchange for 3B Juan Uribe and RHP Chris Withrow. Optioned Thomas to AAA Oklahoma City, assigned Jaime to extend spring training and designated Stults for assignment. Designated RHP Sergio Santos for assignment and recalled OF Chris Heisey from AAA Oklahoma City.
- On May 30, activated C Yasmani Grandal from the 7-day concussion list and optioned OF Chris Heisey to AAA Oklahoma City.
- On May 31, placed LHP Paco Rodriguez on the 15-day disabled list with a left elbow strain and recalled RHP Matt West from AAA Oklahoma City.

=== June ===
- On June 1, optioned RHP Matt West to AAA Oklahoma City, transferred OF Carl Crawford from the 15-day disabled list to the 60-day disabled list and purchased the contract of LHP David Huff from AAA Oklahoma City.
- On June 2, placed OF Scott Van Slyke on the 15-day disabled list with mild back inflammation and recalled OF Chris Heisey and LHP Ian Thomas from AAA Oklahoma City. Following the first game of a doubleheader, they optioned C Austin Barnes to AAA Oklahoma City, designated LHP David Huff for assignment, recalled LHP Daniel Coulombe from AAA Oklahoma City and purchased the contract of RHP Josh Ravin from AAA Oklahoma City.
- On June 3, optioned LHP Ian Thomas to AAA Oklahoma City.
- On June 5, optioned LHP Daniel Coulombe to AAA Oklahoma City and recalled OF Scott Schebler from AAA Oklahoma City.
- On June 6, activated OF Yasiel Puig from the 15-day disabled list and optioned OF Scott Schebler to AAA Oklahoma City.
- On June 12, acquired IF Ronald Torreyes from the Toronto Blue Jays in exchange for cash considerations and optioned him to AA Tulsa. Designated IF Darwin Barney for assignment.
- On June 17, placed RHP Chris Hatcher on the 15-day disabled list with a strained oblique and activated OF Scott Van Slyke from the 15-day disabled list.
- On June 18, optioned OF Chris Heisey to AAA Oklahoma City and recalled LHP Daniel Coulombe from AAA Oklahoma City.
- On June 20, optioned RHP Josh Ravin to AAA Oklahoma City and recalled RHP Matt West from AAA Oklahoma City.
- On June 22, activated RHP Joel Peralta from the 15-day disabled list, optioned LHP Daniel Coulombe and RHP Matt West to AAA Oklahoma City and recalled LHP Ian Thomas from AAA Oklahoma City.
- On June 26, activated RHP Pedro Báez from the 15-day disabled list and optioned LHP Ian Thomas to AAA Oklahoma City.

=== July ===
- On July 2, designated RHP Brandon League for assignment.
- On July 5, placed RHP Carlos Frías on the 15-day disabled list, retroactive to July 1, with lower back stiffness, and recalled LHP Daniel Coulombe from AAA Oklahoma City.
- On July 6, optioned LHP Daniel Coulombe to AAA Oklahoma City, transferred LHP Paco Rodriguez from the 15-day disabled list to the 60-day disabled list and purchased the contract of LHP Eric Surkamp from AAA Oklahoma City.
- On July 7, optioned LHP Eric Surkamp to AAA Oklahoma City and recalled RHP Ian Thomas from AAA Oklahoma City.
- On July 8, optioned RHP Ian Thomas and RHP Yimi García to AAA Oklahoma City, recalled RHP Josh Ravin from AAA Oklahoma City, purchased the contract of RHP Chin-hui Tsao from AAA Oklahoma City and designated LHP Eric Surkamp for assignment.
- On July 10, claimed RHP Preston Guilmet off waivers from the Tampa Bay Rays and designated LHP Chris Reed for assignment.
- On July 11, activated RHP Brandon Beachy from the 60-day disabled list, optioned RHP Josh Ravin to AAA Oklahoma City and designated RHP Matt West for assignment.
- On July 18, recalled RHP Zach Lee from AAA Oklahoma City.
- On July 19, optioned RHP Zach Lee to AAA Oklahoma City.
- On July 20, placed C A. J. Ellis on the 15-day disabled list with right knee inflammation and recalled C Austin Barnes from AAA OKlahoma City.
- On July 21, optioned RHP Brandon Beachy to AAA Oklahoma City, activated LF Carl Crawford from the 60-day disabled list and designated RHP Preston Guilmet for assignment.
- On July 22, optioned LHP Adam Liberatore to AAA Oklahoma City and recalled LHP Ian Thomas from AAA Oklahoma City.
- On July 24, placed RHP Zack Greinke on the paternity list and recalled RHP Josh Ravin from AAA Oklahoma City.
- On July 25, recalled RHP Zach Lee from AAA Oklahoma City and optioned LHP Ian Thomas to AAA Oklahoma City.
- On July 26, optioned RHP Josh Ravin and RHP Chin-hui Tsao to AAA Oklahoma City, recalled RHP Yimi García from AAA Oklahoma City and activated RHP Zack Greinke from the paternity list.
- On July 30, acquired LHP Alex Wood, RHP Bronson Arroyo, RHP Jim Johnson, LHP Luis Avilán, IF José Peraza and cash from the Atlanta Braves and RHP Mat Latos and IF/OF Michael Morse from the Miami Marlins in exchange for IF Héctor Olivera, LHP Paco Rodriguez and minor league pitchers Zachary Bird, Victor Araujo, Jeff Brigham and Kevin Guzman. Arroyo placed on the 60-day disabled list, Peraza optioned to AAA Oklahoma City, RHP Chris Hatcher transferred from the 15-day disabled list to the 60-day disabled list, designated for assignment Morse, RHP Brandon Beachy, OF Chris Heisey and RHP Chin-hui Tsao.
- On July 31, optioned RHP Mike Bolsinger and RHP Zach Lee to AAA Oklahoma City and placed IF Justin Turner on the 15-day disabled list with a right thigh skin infection.

=== August ===
- On August 2, activated RHP Matt Latos and optioned RHP Yimi García to AAA Oklahoma City.
- On August 4, activated C A. J. Ellis from the 15-day disabled list and optioned C Austin Barnes to AAA Oklahoma City.
- On August 10, placed 2B Howie Kendrick on the 15-day disabled list with a strained left hamstring and recalled IF José Peraza from AAA Oklahoma City.
- On August 11, placed RHP Joel Peralta on the 15-day disabled list with a right neck sprain and recalled RHP Yimi García from AAA Oklahoma City.
- On August 13, activated IF Justin Turner from the 15-day disabled list and optioned IF José Peraza to AAA Oklahoma City.
- On August 14, activated RHP Chris Hatcher from the 60-day disabled list, placed RHP Juan Nicasio on the 15-day disabled list with a left abdominal strain and transferred RHP Carlos Frías from the 15-day disabled list to the 60-day disabled list.
- On August 19, acquired 2B Chase Utley from the Philadelphia Phillies in exchange for minor league IF/OF Darnell Sweeney and minor league RHP John Richy. Designated IF Alberto Callaspo for assignment.
- On August 24, optioned RHP Yimi García to AAA Oklahoma City.
- On August 25, activated RHP Juan Nicasio from the 15-day disabled list.
- On August 29, placed OF Yasiel Puig on the 15-day disabled list with a right hamstring strain and recalled IF José Peraza from AAA Oklahoma City.
- On August 31, placed IF/OF Enrique Hernández on the 15-day disabled list with a strained left hamstring and recalled C Austin Barnes from AAA Oklahoma City.

=== September / October ===
- On September 1, recalled RHP Mike Bolsinger, RHP Joe Wieland, RHP Josh Ravin, and LHP Ian Thomas from AAA Oklahoma City, activated RHP Joel Peralta from the 15-day disabled list, placed Ravin on the 60-day disabled list with a left hernia injury and purchased the contract of OF Justin Ruggiano from AAA Oklahoma City.
- On September 2, recalled OF Scott Schebler from AAA Oklahoma City.
- On September 3, recalled RHP Yimi García from AAA Oklahoma City, purchased the contract of IF Corey Seager from AAA Oklahoma City and designated 1B Andy Wilkins for assignment.
- On September 6, purchased the contract of OF Chris Heisey from AAA Oklahoma City and designated LHP Daniel Coulombe for assignment.
- On September 13, recalled IF Ronald Torreyes from AAA Oklahoma City.
- On September 17, designated RHP Mat Latos for assignment and activated RHP Carlos Frías from the 60-day disabled list.
- On September 18, activated 2B Howie Kendrick from the 15-day disabled list.
- On September 22, recalled LHP Adam Liberatore from AAA Oklahoma City.
- On September 28, activated IF/OF Enrique Hernández from the 15-day disabled list.
- On October 3, activated OF Yasiel Puig from the 15-day disabled list.
- On October 14, claimed RHP Brooks Brown off waivers from the Colorado Rockies and designated RHP Jim Johnson for assignment.

== Farm system ==
Level	Team	League	Manager	W	L	Position
AAA	Oklahoma City Dodgers	Pacific Coast League	Damon Berryhill	86	58	1st place Lost in playoffs
AA	Tulsa Drillers	Texas League	Razor Shines	62	77	4th place
High A	Rancho Cucamonga Quakes	California League	Bill Haselman	78	62	1st place League champions
A	Great Lakes Loons	Midwest League	Luis Matos	68	69	7th place Lost in playoffs
Rookie	Ogden Raptors	Pioneer League	John Shoemaker	43	33	1st place Did not qualify for playoffs
Rookie	Arizona League Dodgers	Arizona League	Jack McDowell	17	11	1st place Lost in playoffs
Rookie	DSL Dodgers	Dominican Summer League	Pedro Mega	26	46	7th place

=== Minor League statistical leaders ===
==== Batting ====
- Average: Ariel Sandoval – AZL Dodgers – .325
- Home runs: Cody Bellinger – Rancho Cucamonga – 30
- RBI: Cody Bellinger – Rancho Cucamonga – 103
- OBP: Lars Anderson – Tulsa – .370
- SLG: Cody Bellinger – Rancho Cucamonga – .538

==== Pitching ====
- ERA: Zach Lee – Oklahoma City – 2.63
- Wins: Zach Lee – Oklahoma City – 13
- Strikeouts: Jose De Leon – Tulsa – 163
- Saves: David Aardsma – Oklahoma City – 15
- WHIP: Trevor Oaks – Great Lakes – 1.04

==== Mid-Season All-Stars ====
- All-Star Futures Game

Pitcher Juan González (World team)
Catcher Kyle Farmer (US team)

- Pacific Coast League All-Stars

Pitcher Ryan Buchter
Catcher Austin Barnes
Second baseman Darnell Sweeney
Shortstop Corey Seager
Coach Franklin Stubbs

- Texas League All-Stars

Pitcher Chris Anderson
Pitcher Jeremy Kehrt
Pitcher Jeremy Horst
Shortstop Luis Mateo

- California League All-Stars

Pitcher Jose De Leon
Catcher Kyle Farmer
Infielder Cody Bellinger
Infielder Brandon Trinkwon
Manager Bill Haselman

- Midwest League All-Stars

Pitcher Grant Holmes
Pitcher J.D. Underwood
Infielder Michael Ahmed

- Pioneer League All-Stars

Infielder Willie Calhoun
Infielder Nick Dean
Infielder Nick Sell
Outfielder Matt Jones

- Dominican Summer League All-Stars

Pitcher Leonardo Crawford
Infielder Jimy Perez

==== Post-Season All-Stars ====
- Pacific Coast League All-Stars

Catcher Austin Barnes
Manager of the Year Damon Berryhill

- California League All-Stars

Catcher Tyler Ogle
Designated Hitter Cody Bellinger

- Midwest League All-Stars

Outfielder Alex Verdugo

- Pioneer League All-Stars

Pitcher Jairo Pacheco
Outfielder Matt Jones

- Arizona League All-Stars

Outfielder Ariel Sandoval

- Baseball America Minor League All-Star Team

First team Shortstop Corey Seager
Second team Pitcher José De León

- Baseball America Minor League classification All-Stars

AAA Catcher Austin Barnes
AAA Shortstop: Corey Seager (also AAA Player of the Year)

==== Notes ====
- Zach Lee and Alex Verdugo were named as the Dodgers organizational minor league pitcher and player of the year.
- On June 11, Leonardo Crawford, Wally Vrolijk and Johan Diaz of the Dominican Summer League Dodgers combined on a no-hitter in a 7–0 win over the Dominican Summer League Mets. It was the first no-hitter in the DSL since August 7, 2012 (a rain shortened five inning game).
- The Rancho Cucamonga Quakes defeated the Visalia Rawhide 5–2 on June 20 to clinch the first-half championship of the California League South Division and a spot in the playoffs. They won the first round playoff series over the High Desert Mavericks on a walk-off single. They then beat the San Jose Giants in three games to win the California League championship.
- The Great Lakes Loons clinched a playoff berth with a wild card spot in the first half. They were swept in two games by the Lansing Lugnuts in the first round of the playoffs.
- The Arizona League Dodgers lost in the quarterfinals of the Arizona League playoffs to the Arizona League White Sox.
- The Oklahoma City Dodgers clinched the Pacific Coast League American North Division title with a win over the Iowa Cubs on September 2. They were swept in three games by the Round Rock Express in the first round of the playoffs.
- Despite owning the best overall record in the Pioneer League over the entire season, the Ogden Raptors did not make the playoffs as they didn't win either side of the split season schedule.

== Major League Baseball draft ==
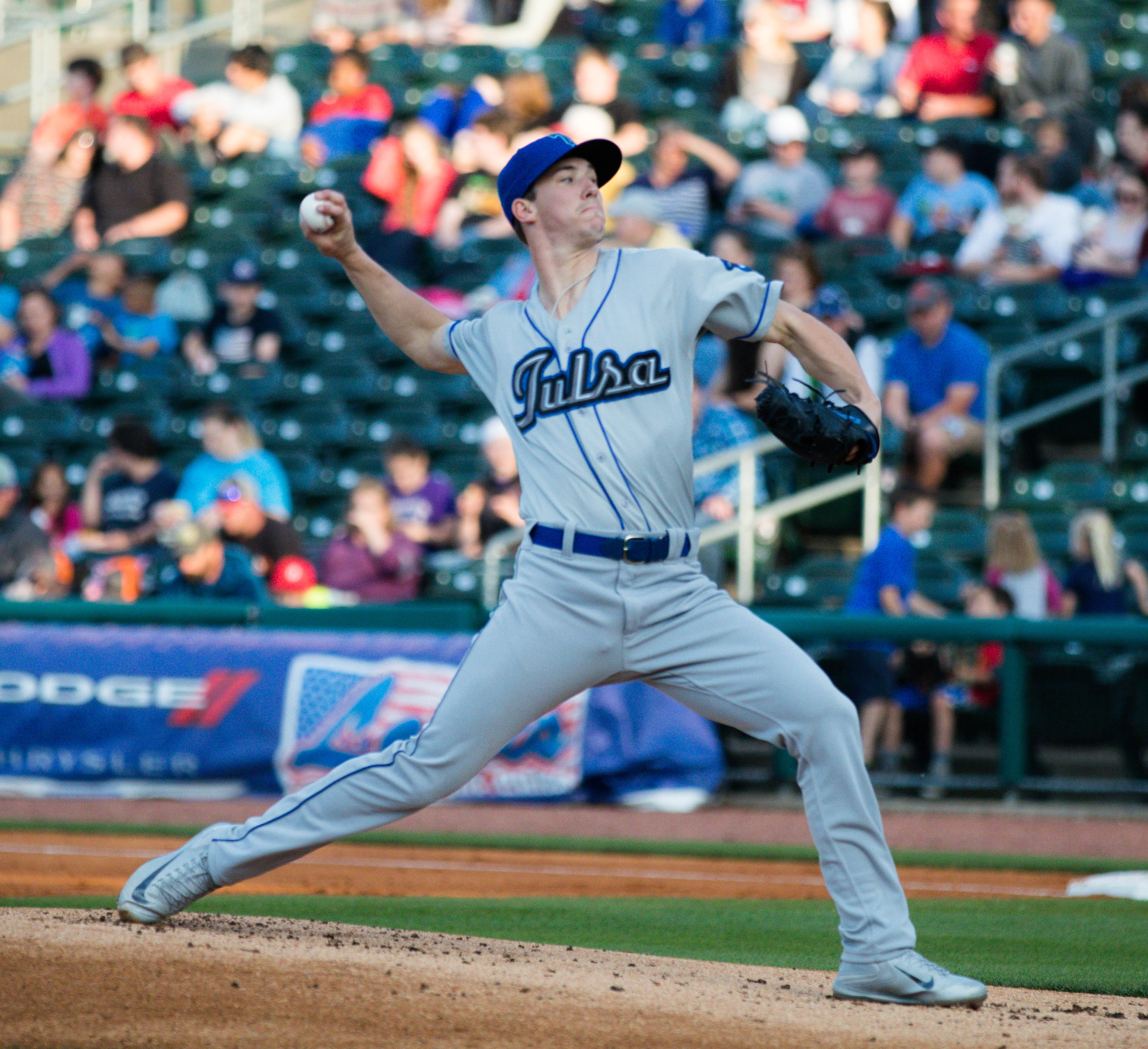
Walker Buehler

The Dodgers selected 42 players in this draft. Of those, eight of them have played Major League Baseball. They received a supplementary first round pick as a result of losing shortstop Hanley Ramírez to free agency and acquired a competitive balance pick from the Baltimore Orioles as part of the Ryan Webb trade.

The first round draft pick was right-handed pitcher Walker Buehler from Vanderbilt University and the supplementary pick was pitcher Kyle Funkhouser from Louisville University. Funkhouser chose to return to school and did not sign.

2015 draft picks

Round	Name	Position	School	Signed	Career span	Highest level
1	Walker Buehler	RHP	Vanderbilt University	Yes	2016–present	MLB
1s	Kyle Funkhouser	RHP	University of Louisville	No; Tigers-2016	2016–2025	MLB
2	Mitch Hansen	OF	Plano Senior High School	Yes	2015–2019	A
Comp B	Josh Sborz	RHP	University of Virginia	Yes	2015–present	MLB
3	Philip Pfeifer	LHP	Vanderbilt University	Yes	2015–2023	AAA
4	Willie Calhoun	2B	Yavapai College	Yes	2015–present	MLB
5	Brendon Davis	SS	Lakewood High School	Yes	2015–2024	MLB
6	Edwin Ríos	1B	Florida International University	Yes	2015–present	MLB
7	Andrew Sopko	RHP	Gonzaga University	Yes	2015–2019	AAA
8	Tommy Bergjans	RHP	Haverford College	Yes	2015–2018	AAA
9	Kevin Brown	RHP	California State University, Dominguez Hills	Yes	2015–2017	A+
10	Logan Landon	CF	University of Texas–Pan American	Yes	2015–2021	AAA
11	Imani Abdullah	RHP	Madison High School	Yes	2015–2018	A+
12	Matt Beaty	C	Belmont University	Yes	2015–2024	MLB
13	Michael Boyle	LHP	Radford University	Yes	2015–2019	AA
14	Garrett Kennedy	C	University of Miami	Yes	2015–2018	AAA
15	Garrett Zech	CF	Naples High School	No		
16	Nolan Long	RHP	Wagner College	Yes	2015–2022	AA
17	Jason Goldstein	C	University of Illinois	No Mariners -2016	2016–2018	AAA
18	Chris Godinez	2B	Bradley University	Yes	2015–2016	A
19	Joe Genord	C	Park Vista Community High School	No; Mets-2019	2019–2021	A+
20	John Boushelle	RHP	Fayetteville High School	No	2021	Ind
21	Jake Henson	C	Saint Louis University	Yes	2015–2016	AA
22	Jordan Tarsovich	2B	Virginia Military Institute	Yes	2015–2017	AA
23	Andrew Istler	RHP	Duke University	Yes	2015–2019	AAA
24	Cameron Palmer	RHP	University of Toledo	Yes	2015–2016	A
25	Rob McDonnell	LHP	University of Illinois	Yes	2015–2017	A
26	Marcus Crescentini	RHP	Missouri Baptist University	Yes	2015–2019	AA
27	Ivan Vieitez	RHP	Lenoir–Rhyne University	Yes	2015–2019	AA
28	Kyle Garlick	CF	Cal Poly Pomona	Yes	2015–present	MLB
29	Jason Bilous	RHP	Caravel Academy	No; White Sox - 2018	2018–2025	AAA
30	Logan Crouse	RHP	Bloomingdale High School	Yes	2015–2017	A
31	Corey Copping	RHP	University of Oklahoma	Yes	2015–2019	AAA
32	Nick Dean	SS	Maryville College	Yes	2015–2016	A+
33	Adam Bray	RHP	University of South Dakota	Yes	2015–2019	AAA
34	Luis Rodriguez	RHP	Calusa Preparatory School	Yes	2015–2016	Rookie
35	Gage Green	C	Oklahoma State University	Yes	2015–2017	A
36	Drayton Riekenberg	RHP	Fresno City College	Yes	2015	AA
37	Casey Mulholland	RHP	University of South Florida	Yes	2015	Rookie
38	Edwin Drexler	CF	Grambling State University	Yes	2015	A+
39	Chris Powell	RHP	Cal Poly Pomona	Yes	2015–2018	AA
40	Isaac Anderson	RHP	Wichita State University	Yes	2015–2018	AA
