= 2015 San Francisco Giants season =

2015 San Francisco Giants
- League: National League
- Division: West
- Ballpark: AT&T Park
- City: San Francisco, California
- Record: 84–78 (.519)
- Divisional place: 2nd
- Owners: Larry Baer (managing general partner)
- General managers: Bobby Evans
- Managers: Bruce Bochy
- Television: KNTV (NBC Bay Area 11) (Jon Miller, Mike Krukow, Duane Kuiper); CSN Bay Area (Duane Kuiper, Mike Krukow, Dave Flemming, Jon Miller)
- Radio: KNBR (680 AM) (Jon Miller, Dave Flemming, Duane Kuiper, Mike Krukow); KTRB (860 AM, Spanish) (Erwin Higueros, Tito Fuentes)
- Stats: ESPN.com; Baseball Reference

The 2015 San Francisco Giants season was the Giants' 133rd year in Major League Baseball, their 58th year in San Francisco since their move from New York following the 1957 season, and their 16th at AT&T Park. The team entered the season as the defending World Series champions and finished in second place in the National League West for the second straight year, but missed the playoffs with a record of 84–78 (.519).

== Events ==
- November 24, 2014 – Free agent IF Pablo Sandoval signs a five-year deal with the Boston Red Sox, bringing to an end Sandoval's decorated tenure with the Giants.
- December 4, 2014 – The Giants avoid arbitration with IF Travis Ishikawa and C Héctor Sánchez, agreeing to one-year deals worth $1.1 million and $800,000 respectively.
- December 19, 2014 – The Giants acquired IF Casey McGehee from the Miami Marlins in exchange for minor-league RHP's Kendry Flores and Luis Castillo.
- December 22, 2014 – The Giants re-sign free agent RHP Sergio Romo to a two-year deal worth $15 million.
- December 23, 2014 – Free agent RHP Jake Peavy re-signs with the Giants, agreeing to a two-year deal worth $24 million. Peavy receives full no-trade protection.
- January 16, 2015 – A couple of hours prior to the deadline for exchanging arbitration figures, the Giants agree to a one-year $2.1 million deal with RHP Yusmeiro Petit to avoid arbitration.
- January 19, 2015 – The Giants officially announce the signing of free-agent OF Nori Aoki to a one-year deal with an option for a second year. Aoki's deal is reportedly worth $4 million with another $1.5 million available in incentives. The option for the 2016 season is a team option worth $5.5 million with a $700,000 buyout, that becomes a mutual option if Aoki reaches 550 plate appearances.
- January 22, 2015 – Despite arbitration figures being submitted, the Giants agree to a two-year deal with OF Gregor Blanco to avoid the process. Blanco's deal is reportedly worth $3.6 million in the first year, and $3.9 million in the second.
- January 23, 2015 – The Giants re-sign RHP Ryan Vogelsong to a one-year deal reported to be worth $4 million plus performance bonuses.
- January 27, 2015 – The Giants avoid arbitration with IF Brandon Crawford agreeing to a one-year deal worth $3.175 million, reportedly the midpoint between the two sides arbitration figure submissions.
- February 2, 2015 – The Giants agree to a one-year contract with IF Brandon Belt, the deal is reportedly worth $3.6 million. The midpoint between the two sides arbitration submissions was $3.75 million.
- February 12, 2015 – The Giants agree to a one-year contract with IF Casey McGehee, the deal is reportedly worth $4.8 million. The midpoint between the two sides arbitration submissions was $4.7 million.
- March 5, 2015 – OF Hunter Pence breaks his arm when hit by a pitch during a spring training game at Scottsdale Stadium.
- March 31, 2015 – The Giants designate 2010 first-round pick OF Gary Brown for assignment in order to make room for non-roster invitee OF Justin Maxwell. Maxwell, a Giants fan growing up, was told he would make the Giants opening day roster.
- April 3, 2015 – Bruce Bochy and Brian Sabean agree to contract extensions with the Giants through at least the 2019 season. Sabean is promoted to Vice-President of Baseball Operations, while Bobby Evans is promoted to General Manager.
- April 5, 2015 – The Giants opening day roster is announced with the Giants naming 13 pitchers, and choosing IF Matt Duffy over IF Ehíré Adríanza for the final bench spot. OF Hunter Pence and IF Travis Ishikawa will begin the season on the disabled list.
- April 7, 2015 – The day after the Giants open the season with a win against the Arizona Diamondbacks, with RHP Jake Peavy having already been scheduled to miss his first start of the year, RHP Matt Cain is placed on the 15-day disabled list with a flexor tendon strain. The Giants call up RHP Chris Heston to take Cain's place in the rotation.
- April 18, 2015 – The Giants lose another starting pitcher when RHP Jake Peavy is placed on the disabled list with a back strain, moving RHP Ryan Vogelsong back from the bullpen into the rotation.
- May 16, 2015 – OF Hunter Pence is activated from the disabled list, doubling in his first at-bat and scoring three runs in the game.
- May 21, 2015 – The Giants complete a three-game shutout sweep of the Los Angeles Dodgers at AT&T Park, a feat they last managed June 25–27, 2012.
- June 8, 2015 – The 2015 Major League Baseball draft takes place with the Giants selecting RHP Phil Bickford with the 18th overall pick.
- June 9, 2015 – RHP Chris Heston pitches the 17th no-hitter in Giants history against the New York Mets, making 110 pitches, striking out 11 including three called strikeouts in the 9th inning, with the only baserunners being 3 hit batsmen. Heston also had two hits and drove in two runs in the game. The no-hitter was the third by a Giants rookie and the first by a visiting pitcher at Citi Field. The Giants became the second team in history to throw no-hitters in four consecutive seasons, following the 1962–65 Los Angeles Dodgers.
- June 12, 2015 – OF Hunter Pence returns to the disabled list with tendinitis in his left wrist.
- June 20, 2015 – OF Nori Aoki is hit by a pitch from Dodgers RHP Carlos Frías. After initially being diagnosed with a contusion, a second X-ray revealed that Aoki had fractured his right fibula and would have to spend two weeks with his leg in a cast before being re-evaluated. Aoki was placed on the 15-day disabled list.
- July 2, 2015 – The Giants sign Bahamian IF Lucius Fox with a signing bonus of $6 million. Fox ranked 3rd on MLB.com's top 30 international prospects.
- July 3, 2015 – RHP Matt Cain and RHP Jake Peavy return from the disabled list, losing two games of an 0-6 road-trip for the Giants. RHPs Tim Lincecum and Tim Hudson are placed on the disabled list in their places.
- July 6, 2015 – The rosters for the 2015 Major League Baseball All-Star Game are announced, with C Buster Posey being named the National League's starter at catcher and to the all-star game for the third time. LHP Madison Bumgarner is named to his third all-star roster, IF Joe Panik and IF Brandon Crawford make the all-star game for the first time.
- July 7, 2015 – OF Hunter Pence comes off the disabled list helping the Giants to snap a 7-game losing streak, and to a sweep of the Philadelphia Phillies to leave their record at 46–43 at the All-star break.
- July 30, 2015 – The Giants trade two minor leaguers; IF Adam Duvall and RHP Keury Mella to the Cincinnati Reds in exchange for RHP Mike Leake.
- August 20, 2015 – On a day when two of the Giants starting outfielders were on the disabled list, the Giants acquire OF Marlon Byrd and cash d from the Cincinnati Reds in exchange for minor league RHP Stephen Johnson.
- August 31, 2015 – The Giants acquire OF Alejandro De Aza and cash from the Boston Red Sox in exchange for minor league LHP Luis Ysla.

== Season standings ==
=== National League West ===
NL West
Team	W	L	Pct.	GB	Home	Road
Los Angeles Dodgers	92	70	.568	—	55‍–‍26	37‍–‍44
San Francisco Giants	84	78	.519	8	47‍–‍34	37‍–‍44
Arizona Diamondbacks	79	83	.488	13	39‍–‍42	40‍–‍41
San Diego Padres	74	88	.457	18	39‍–‍42	35‍–‍46
Colorado Rockies	68	94	.420	24	36‍–‍45	32‍–‍49

=== National League Division and Wild Card Standings ===
Division leaders
Team	W	L	Pct.
St. Louis Cardinals	100	62	.617
Los Angeles Dodgers	92	70	.568
New York Mets	90	72	.556

Wild Card teams (Top 2 teams qualify for postseason)
Team	W	L	Pct.	GB
Pittsburgh Pirates	98	64	.605	+1
Chicago Cubs	97	65	.599	—
San Francisco Giants	84	78	.519	13
Washington Nationals	83	79	.512	14
Arizona Diamondbacks	79	83	.488	18
San Diego Padres	74	88	.457	23
Miami Marlins	71	91	.438	26
Milwaukee Brewers	68	94	.420	29
Colorado Rockies	68	94	.420	29
Atlanta Braves	67	95	.414	30
Cincinnati Reds	64	98	.395	33
Philadelphia Phillies	63	99	.389	34

=== Record vs. opponents ===
2015 National League record Source: MLB Standings Grid – 2015
Team	AZ	ATL	CHC	CIN	COL	LAD	MIA	MIL	NYM	PHI	PIT	SD	SF	STL	WSH	AL
Arizona	—	3–3	2–4	6–1	13–6	6–13	5–2	5–2	2–5	2–4	1–5	9–10	11–8	0–7	3–4	11–9
Atlanta	3–3	—	1–6	3–4	1–6	3–3	10–9	5–2	8–11	11–8	2–4	2–5	3–4	4–2	5–14	6–14
Chicago	4–2	6–1	—	13–6	4–2	3–4	3–3	14–5	7–0	2–5	11–8	3–3	5–2	8–11	4–3	10–10
Cincinnati	1–6	4–3	6–13	—	2–4	1–6	3–4	9–10	0–7	4–2	11–8	2–4	2–5	7–12	5–1	7–13
Colorado	6–13	6–1	2–4	4–2	—	8–11	2–5	5–1	0–7	5–2	1–6	7–12	11–8	3–4	3–3	5–15
Los Angeles	13–6	3–3	4–3	6–1	11–8	—	4–2	4–3	3–4	5–2	1–5	14–5	8–11	2–5	4–2	10–10
Miami	2–5	9–10	3–3	4–3	5–2	2–4	—	4–2	8–11	9–10	1–6	2–5	5–2	1–5	9–10	7–13
Milwaukee	2–5	2–5	5–14	10–9	1–5	3–4	2–4	—	3–3	7–0	10–9	5–2	1–5	6–13	3–4	8–12
New York	5–2	11–8	0–7	7–0	7–0	4–3	11–8	3–3	—	14–5	0–6	2–4	3–3	3–4	11–8	9–11
Philadelphia	4–2	8–11	5–2	2–4	2–5	2–5	10–9	0–7	5–14	—	2–5	5–1	1–5	2–5	7–12	8–12
Pittsburgh	5–1	4–2	8–11	8–11	6–1	5–1	6–1	9–10	6–0	5–2	—	5–2	6–1	9–10	3–4	13–7
San Diego	10–9	5–2	3–3	4–2	12–7	5–14	5–2	2–5	4–2	1–5	2–5	—	8–11	4–3	2–5	7–13
San Francisco	8–11	4–3	2–5	5–2	8–11	11–8	2–5	5–1	3–3	5–1	1–6	11–8	—	2–4	4–3	13–7
St. Louis	7–0	2–4	11–8	12–7	4–3	5–2	5–1	13–6	4–3	5–2	10–9	3–4	4–2	—	4–2	11–9
Washington	4–3	14–5	3–4	1–5	3–3	2–4	10–9	4–3	8–11	12–7	4–3	5–2	3–4	2–4	—	8–12

== Game log and schedule ==
All schedule and scores taken from MLB.com.

Legend
	Giants win
	Giants loss
	Postponement
**Bold**	Giants team member

2015 Game Log
April (9–13)

#	Date	Opponent	Score	Win	Loss	Save	Attendance	Record
1	April 6	@ Diamondbacks	5–4	**Bumgarner** (1–0)	Collmenter (0–1)	**Casilla** (1)	49,043	1–0
2	April 7	@ Diamondbacks	6–7	De La Rosa (1–0)	**Vogelsong** (0–1)	Reed (1)	22,626	1–1
3	April 8	@ Diamondbacks	5–2	**Heston** (1–0)	Hellickson (0–1)	**Casilla** (2)	21,642	2–1
4	April 9	@ Padres	1–0 (12)	**Kontos** (1–0)	Vincent (0–1)	**Casilla** (3)	45,150	3–1
5	April 10	@ Padres	0–1	Benoit (2–0)	**Affeldt** (0–1)	Kimbrel (1)	40,015	3–2
6	April 11	@ Padres	2–10	Shields (1–0)	**Bumgarner** (1–1)		42,823	3–3
7	April 12	@ Padres	4–6	Ross (1–0)	**Peavy** (0–1)	Kimbrel (2)	40,184	3–4
8	April 13	Rockies	0–2	Butler (1–0)	**Heston** (1–1)	Betancourt (1)	42,019	3–5
9	April 14	Rockies	1–4	Oberg (1–0)	**Hudson** (0–1)	Ottavino (1)	41,051	3–6
10	April 15	Rockies	2–4	Matzek (1–0)	**Lincecum** (0–1)	Ottavino (2)	41,188	3–7
11	April 16	Diamondbacks	6–7 (12)	Delgado (1–1)	**Romo** (0–1)		41,545	3–8
12	April 17	Diamondbacks	0–9	Collmenter (1–2)	**Peavy** (0–2)		41,550	3–9
13	April 18	Diamondbacks	4–1	**Heston** (2–1)	De La Rosa (2–1)	**Casilla** (4)	41,756	4–9
14	April 19	Diamondbacks	1–5	Hellickson (1–2)	**Hudson** (0–2)		41,528	4–10
15	April 21	Dodgers	6–2	**Lincecum** (1–1)	Anderson (1–1)	**Casilla** (5)	41,386	5–10
16	April 22	Dodgers	3–2	**Casilla** (1–0)	Hatcher (0–2)		42,259	6–10
17	April 23	Dodgers	3–2 (10)	**Casilla** (2–0)	Nicasio (0–1)		41,240	7–10
18	April 24	@ Rockies	4–6	Butler (2–1)	**Heston** (2–2)	Ottavino (3)	31,453	7–11
19	April 25	@ Rockies	5–4 (11)	**Machi** (1–0)	Brown (0–1)		36,474	8–11
–	April 26	@ Rockies	**Postponed (inclement weather)** (Makeup date:May 23)					
20	April 27	@ Dodgers	3–8	Frías (1–0)	**Lincecum** (1–2)		46,704	8–12
21	April 28	@ Dodgers	2–1	**Bumgarner** (2–1)	Kershaw (1–2)	**Casilla** (6)	50,161	9–12
22	April 29	@ Dodgers	3–7	Greinke (4–0)	**Vogelsong** (0–2)		53,285	9–13

May (21–9)

#	Date	Opponent	Score	Win	Loss	Save	Attendance	Record
23	May 1	Angels	3–2	**Casilla** (3–0)	Smith (0–1)		41,507	10–13
24	May 2	Angels	5–4	**Hudson** (1–2)	Santiago (2–2)	**Casilla** (7)	41,287	11–13
25	May 3	Angels	5–0	**Lincecum** (2–2)	Weaver (0–4)		41,516	12–13
26	May 4	Padres	2–0	**Bumgarner** (3–1)	Ross (1–3)	**Casilla** (8)	41,278	13–13
27	May 5	Padres	6–0	**Vogelsong** (1–2)	Cashner (1–5)		41,358	14–13
28	May 6	Padres	1–9	Kennedy (2–1)	**Heston** (2–3)		41,060	14–14
29	May 7	Marlins	2–7	Haren (4–1)	**Hudson** (1–3)		41,367	14–15
30	May 8	Marlins	6–0	**Lincecum** (3–2)	Cosart (1–3)	**Petit** (1)	41,413	15–15
31	May 9	Marlins	2–6	Phelps (2–0)	**Bumgarner** (3–2)		42,285	15–16
32	May 10	Marlins	3–2	**Casilla** (4–0)	Cishek (1–2)		41,889	16–16
33	May 12	@ Astros	8–1	**Heston** (3–3)	McHugh (4–1)		20,468	17–16
34	May 13	@ Astros	3–4	Qualls (1–2)	**Affeldt** (0–2)	Gregerson (8)	20,725	17–17
35	May 14	@ Reds	3–4	Díaz (2–0)	**Romo** (0–2)	Chapman (7)	21,792	17–18
36	May 15	@ Reds	10–2	**Bumgarner** (4–2)	Marquis (3–3)		39,867	18–18
37	May 16	@ Reds	11–2	**Vogelsong** (2–2)	Leake (2–2)		40,889	19–18
38	May 17	@ Reds	9–8	**Petit** (1–0)	DeSclafani (2–4)	**Casilla** (9)	39,209	20–18
39	May 19	Dodgers	2–0	**Hudson** (2–3)	Frías (3–1)	**Casilla** (10)	41,392	21–18
40	May 20	Dodgers	4–0	**Lincecum** (4–2)	Anderson (2–2)		41,920	22–18
41	May 21	Dodgers	4–0	**Bumgarner** (5–2)	Kershaw (2–3)		41,840	23–18
42	May 22	@ Rockies	11–8	**Vogelsong** (3–2)	Kendrick (1–6)	**Casilla** (11)	31,226	24–18
43	May 23	@ Rockies	10–8	**Heston** (4–3)	Lyles (2–5)	**Casilla** (12)	32,956	25–18
44	May 23	@ Rockies	3–5	Hale (1–0)	**Petit** (1–1)	Axford (6)	30,180	25–19
45	May 24	@ Rockies	2–11	Bettis (1–0)	**Hudson** (2–4)		34,404	25–20
46	May 25	@ Brewers	8–4	**Lincecum** (5–2)	Lohse (3–5)		41,969	26–20
47	May 26	@ Brewers	6–3	**Bumgarner** (6–2)	Garza (2–7)	**Casilla** (13)	35,492	27–20
48	May 27	@ Brewers	3–1	**Vogelsong** (4–2)	Fiers (1–5)	**Casilla** (14)	35,208	28–20
49	May 28	Braves	7–0	**Heston** (5–3)	Miller (5–2)		41,040	29–20
50	May 29	Braves	4–2	**Hudson** (3–4)	Foltynewicz (3–2)	**Casilla** (15)	41,311	30–20
51	May 30	Braves	0–8	Pérez (1–0)	**Lincecum** (5–3)		42,005	30–21
52	May 31	Braves	5–7	Masset (1–1)	**Casilla** (4–1)	Grilli (15)	41,553	30–22

June (12–14)

#	Date	Opponent	Score	Win	Loss	Save	Attendance	Record
53	June 1	Pirates	3–4	Cole (8–2)	**Vogelsong** (4–3)	Melancon (14)	41,546	30–23
54	June 2	Pirates	4–7	Burnett (6–1)	**Heston** (5–4)	Melancon (15)	41,913	30–24
55	June 3	Pirates	2–5	Liriano (3–4)	**Hudson** (3–5)	Melancon (16)	41,495	30–25
56	June 5	@ Phillies	5–4	**Lincecum** (6–3)	García (2–2)	**Casilla** (16)	20,638	31–25
57	June 6	@ Phillies	7–5	**Bumgarner** (7–2)	González (2–2)	**Casilla** (17)	29,102	32–25
58	June 7	@ Phillies	4–6	Giles (2–1)	**Vogelsong** (4–4)	Papelbon (12)	24,799	32–26
59	June 9	@ Mets	5–0	**Heston** (6–4)	Syndergaard (2–4)		23,155	33–26
60	June 10	@ Mets	8–5	**Hudson** (4–5)	Harvey (6–4)	**Casilla** (18)	24,436	34–26
61	June 11	@ Mets	4–5	Familia (2–0)	**Romo** (0–3)		25,143	34–27
62	June 12	Diamondbacks	0–1	Anderson (2–1)	**Bumgarner** (7–3)	Ziegler (7)	41,952	34–28
63	June 13	Diamondbacks	2–4	Webster (1–0)	**Vogelsong** (4–5)	Ziegler (8)	42,006	34–29
64	June 14	Diamondbacks	0–4	De La Rosa (5–3)	**Heston** (6–5)	Hudson (1)	41,310	34–30
65	June 15	Mariners	1–5	Walker (4–6)	**Hudson** (4–6)		42,099	34–31
66	June 16	Mariners	6–2	**Lincecum** (7–3)	Happ (3–3)		41,267	35–31
67	June 17	@ Mariners	0–2	Hernández (10–3)	**Bumgarner** (7–4)	Smith (3)	38,844	35–32
68	June 18	@ Mariners	7–0	**Vogelsong** (5–5)	Montgomery (1–2)		34,354	36–32
69	June 19	@ Dodgers	9–5	**Heston** (7–5)	Bolsinger (4–2)	**Casilla** (19)	52,503	37–32
70	June 20	@ Dodgers	6–2	**Hudson** (5–6)	Frías (4–5)		53,123	38–32
71	June 21	@ Dodgers	2–10	Anderson (3–4)	**Lincecum** (7–4)		53,509	38–33
72	June 23	Padres	2–3 (11)	Maurer (5–0)	**Strickland** (0–1)	Kimbrel (18)	42,067	38–34
73	June 24	Padres	6–0	**Vogelsong** (6–5)	Kennedy (4–6)		41,744	39–34
74	June 25	Padres	13–8	**Heston** (8–5)	Shields (7–2)		41,533	40–34
75	June 26	Rockies	6–8	Bettis (4–2)	**Hudson** (5–7)		41,887	40–35
76	June 27	Rockies	7–5	**Kontos** (2–0)	Betancourt (2-3)	**Casilla** (20)	41,746	41–35
77	June 28	Rockies	6–3	**Bumgarner** (8–4)	Kendrick (3–10)		41,795	42–35
78	June 30	@ Marlins	3–5	Latos (3–5)	**Vogelsong** (6–6)	Ramos (11)	19,711	42–36

July (14–10)

#	Date	Opponent	Score	Win	Loss	Save	Attendance	Record
79	July 1	@ Marlins	5–6	Cishek (2–5)	**Casilla** (4–2)		19,341	42–37
80	July 2	@ Marlins	4–5	Fernández (1–0)	**Cain** (0–1)	Ramos (12)	32,598	42–38
81	July 3	@ Nationals	1–2	Gonzalez (6–4)	**Peavy** (0–3)	Storen (24)	41,693	42–39
82	July 4	@ Nationals	3–9	Roark (4–3)	**Bumgarner** (8–5)		40,029	42–40
83	July 5	@ Nationals	1–3	Zimmermann (7–5)	**Kontos** (2–1)	Storen (25)	33,157	42–41
84	July 6	Mets	0–3	Niese (4–8)	**Romo** (0–4)	Familia (23)	42,247	42–42
85	July 7	Mets	3–0	**Cain** (1–1)	Colón (9–7)	**Casilla** (21)	42,164	43–42
86	July 8	Mets	1–4	deGrom (9–6)	**Peavy** (0–4)	Familia (24)	41,914	43–43
87	July 10	Phillies	15–2	**Bumgarner** (9–5)	Hamels (5–7)		41,895	44–43
88	July 11	Phillies	8–5	**Osich** (1–0)	García (3–4)	**Casilla** (22)	41,980	45–43
89	July 12	Phillies	4–2	**Heston** (9–5)	Billingsley (1–3)	**Casilla** (23)	42,387	46–43
90	July 17	@ Diamondbacks	6–5 (12)	**Vogelsong** (7–6)	Delgado (4–3)		26,922	47–43
91	July 18	@ Diamondbacks	8–4	**Peavy** (1–4)	Anderson (4–4)	**Romo** (1)	37,609	48–43
92	July 19	@ Diamondbacks	2–1	**Bumgarner** (10–5)	Corbin (1–2)	**Casilla** (24)	27,173	49–43
93	July 20	@ Padres	2–4	Kennedy (5–9)	**Hudson** (5–8)	Kimbrel (26)	35,033	49–44
94	July 21	@ Padres	9–3	**Heston** (10–5)	Despaigne (3–7)		35,596	50–44
95	July 22	@ Padres	7–1	**Cain** (2–1)	Maurer (6–3)		38,435	51–44
96	July 24	Athletics	9–3	**Peavy** (2–4)	Chavez (5–10)		42,128	52–44
97	July 25	Athletics	2–1	**Bumgarner** (11–5)	Bassitt (0–3)	**Casilla** (25)	42,162	53–44
98	July 26	Athletics	4–3	**Hudson** (6–8)	Graveman (6–7)	**Casilla** (26)	42,034	54–44
99	July 27	Brewers	4–2	**Heston** (11–5)	Lohse (5–12)	**Romo** (2)	41,988	55–44
100	July 28	Brewers	2–5	Peralta (2–5)	**Cain** (2–2)	Rodríguez (23)	42,743	55–45
101	July 29	Brewers	5–0	**Strickland** (1–1)	Fiers (5–9)		42,352	56–45
102	July 31	@ Rangers	3–6	Martinez (6–6)	**Bumgarner** (11–6)		30,674	56–46

August (13–16)

#	Date	Opponent	Score	Win	Loss	Save	Attendance	Record
103	August 1	@ Rangers	9–7 (11)	**Strickland** (2–1)	Dyson (0–1)	**Casilla** (27)	41,114	57–46
104	August 2	@ Rangers	1–2	Pérez (1–2)	**Leake** (9–6)	Dyson (1)	22,234	57–47
105	August 3	@ Braves	8–9 (12)	Vizcaíno (2–0)	**Vogelsong** (7–7)		23,428	57–48
106	August 4	@ Braves	8–3	**Affeldt** (1–2)	Aardsma (0–1)		18,411	58–48
107	August 5	@ Braves	6–1	**Bumgarner** (12–6)	Pérez (4–2)		17,444	59–48
108	August 6	@ Cubs	4–5	Grimm (2–3)	**Heston** (11–6)	Rondón (17)	41,242	59–49
109	August 7	@ Cubs	3–7	Lester (7–8)	**Vogelsong** (7–8)	Rondón (18)	41,311	59–50
110	August 8	@ Cubs	6–8	Hendricks (6–5)	**Cain** (2–3)	Grimm (3)	41,305	59–51
111	August 9	@ Cubs	0–2	Arrieta (13–6)	**Peavy** (2–5)	Rondón (19)	39,939	59–52
112	August 11	Astros	3–1	**Bumgarner** (13–6)	Kazmir (6–7)		42,569	60–52
113	August 12	Astros	0–2	Feldman (5–5)	**Heston** (11–7)	Gregerson (23)	41,967	60–53
114	August 13	Nationals	3–1	**Vogelsong** (8–8)	Strasburg (6–6)	**Casilla** (28)	42,109	61–53
115	August 14	Nationals	8–5	**Affeldt** (2–2)	Scherzer (11–9)		41,675	62–53
116	August 15	Nationals	12–6	**Peavy** (3–5)	Gonzalez (9–5)		41,916	63–53
117	August 16	Nationals	5–0	**Bumgarner** (14–6)	Ross (3–5)		41,904	64–53
118	August 17	@ Cardinals	1–2	Siegrist (4–0)	**Strickland** (2–2)	Rosenthal (37)	40,088	64–54
119	August 18	@ Cardinals	2–0	**Vogelsong** (9–8)	Lynn (9–8)	**Casilla** (29)	40,297	65–54
120	August 19	@ Cardinals	3–4	Siegrist (5–0)	**Strickland** (2–3)	Rosenthal (38)	40,278	65–55
121	August 20	@ Pirates	0–4	Morton (8–4)	**Peavy** (3–6)		36,671	65–56
122	August 21	@ Pirates	6–4	**Bumgarner** (15–6)	Locke (6–8)	**Casilla** (30)	37,692	66–56
123	August 22	@ Pirates	2–3	Melancon (3–1)	**Kontos** (2–2)		38,259	66–57
124	August 23	@ Pirates	2–5	Liriano (9–6)	**Vogelsong** (9–9)	Rosenthal (39)	31,364	66–58
125	August 25	Cubs	5–8	Arrieta (16–6)	**Cain** (2–4)	Rondón (24)	41,595	66–59
126	August 26	Cubs	4–2	**Peavy** (4–6)	Hendricks (6–6)	**Casilla** (31)	41,640	67–59
127	August 27	Cubs	9–1	**Bumgarner** (16–6)	Haren (8–9)		41,847	68–59
128	August 28	Cardinals	5–4	**López** (1–0)	Siegrist (5–1)		41,577	69–59
129	August 29	Cardinals	0–6	Lynn (11–8)	**Vogelsong** (9–10)		41,796	69–60
130	August 30	Cardinals	5–7	García (7–4)	**Heston** (11–8)	Siegrist (6)	41,770	69–61
131	August 31	@ Dodgers	4–5 (14)	Hatcher (2–5)	**Broadway** (0–1)		40,851	69–62

September (14–13)

#	Date	Opponent	Score	Win	Loss	Save	Attendance	Record
132	September 1	@ Dodgers	1–2	Greinke (15–3)	**Bumgarner** (16–7)	Jansen (28)	48,060	69–63
133	September 2	@ Dodgers	1–2	Kershaw (12–6)	**Leake** (9–7)		41,648	69–64
134	September 3	@ Rockies	3–11	Rusin (5–7)	**Vogelsong** (9–11)		25,863	69–65
135	September 4	@ Rockies	1–2	de la Rosa (9–6)	**Heston** (11–9)	Axford (19)	29,196	69–66
136	September 5	@ Rockies	7–3	**Peavy** (5–6)	Bettis (6–5)		37,672	70–66
137	September 6	@ Rockies	7–4	**Bumgarner** (17–7)	Flande (3–2)	**Casilla** (32)	36,649	71–66
138	September 7	@ Diamondbacks	1–6	Corbin (5–3)	**Leake** (9–8)		28,078	71–67
139	September 8	@ Diamondbacks	6–2	**Hudson** (7–8)	Anderson (6–6)		18,683	72–67
140	September 9	@ Diamondbacks	1–2	Godley (5–1)	**Heston** (11–10)	Ziegler (25)	20,576	72–68
141	September 11	Padres	9–1	**Peavy** (6–6)	Cashner (5–15)		41,621	73–68
142	September 12	Padres	8–0	**Bumgarner** (18–7)	Kennedy (8–14)		41,564	74–68
143	September 13	Padres	10–3	**Leake** (10–8)	Despaigne (5–9)		41,397	75–68
144	September 14	Reds	5–3	**Kontos** (3–2)	Sampson (2–5)	**Casilla** (33)	41,025	76–68
145	September 15	Reds	8–9 (10)	Chapman (4–4)	**Romo** (0–5)	Díaz (1)	41,044	76–69
146	September 16	Reds	5–3	**Peavy** (7–6)	Lorenzen (4–9)	**Casilla** (34)	41,383	77–69
147	September 18	Diamondbacks	0–2	De La Rosa (13–8)	**Bumgarner** (18–8)	Ziegler (27)	41,346	77–70
148	September 19	Diamondbacks	0–6	Corbin (6–4)	**Leake** (10–9)		41,206	77–71
149	September 20	Diamondbacks	5–1	**Hudson** (8–8)	Hellickson (9–10)		41,390	78–71
150	September 22	@ Padres	4–2	**Kontos** (4–2)	Ross (10–11)	**Casilla** (35)	25,043	79–71
151	September 23	@ Padres	4–5	Kimbrel (3–2)	**Kontos** (4–3)		23,556	79–72
152	September 24	@ Padres	4–5	Kimbrel (4–2)	**Broadway** (0–2)		31,137	79–73
153	September 25	@ Athletics	4–5	Gray (14–7)	**Leake** (10–10)	Doolittle (2)	36,067	79–74
154	September 26	@ Athletics	14–10	**Osich** (2–0)	Dull (0–1)	**Casilla** (36)	36,067	80–74
155	September 27	@ Athletics	5–4	**Heston** (12–10)	Nolin (1–2)	**Casilla** (37)	36,067	81–74
155	September 28	Dodgers	3–2 (12)	**Strickland** (3–3)	García (3–5)		41,341	82–74
157	September 29	Dodgers	0–8	Kershaw (16–7)	**Bumgarner** (18–9)		41,862	82–75
158	September 30	Dodgers	5–0	**Leake** (11–10)	Bolsinger (6–6)		41,112	83–75

October (1–3)

#	Date	Opponent	Score	Win	Loss	Save	Attendance	Record
159	October 1	Dodgers	2–3	Anderson (10–9)	**Hudson** (8–9)	Jansen (35)	41,027	83–76
160	October 2	Rockies	3–9	Kendrick (7–13)	**Heston** (12–11)		41,505	83–77
161	October 3	Rockies	3–2	**Peavy** (8–6)	Rusin (6–10)	**Casilla** (38)	41,398	84–77
162	October 4	Rockies	3–7	Brothers (1–0)	**Kontos** (4–4)		41,399	84–78

== Roster ==
2015 San Francisco Giants
Roster
Pitchers: 41 Jeremy Affeldt; 38 Brett Bochy; 57 Michael Broadway; 40 Madison Bumgarner; 18 Matt Cain; 46 Santiago Casilla; 62 Cory Gearrin; 59 Cody Hall; 53 Chris Heston; 17 Tim Hudson; 70 George Kontos; 13 Mike Leake; 55 Tim Lincecum; 49 Javier López; 63 Jean Machi; 61 Josh Osich; 22 Jake Peavy; 52 Yusmeiro Petit; 54 Sergio Romo; 60 Hunter Strickland; 32 Ryan Vogelsong	Catchers: 56 Trevor Brown; 28 Buster Posey; 29 Héctor Sánchez; 34 Andrew Susac; 14 Jackson Williams; Infielders: 1 Ehíré Adríanza; 13,35 Joaquín Árias; 9 Brandon Belt; 35 Brandon Crawford; 50,5 Matt Duffy; 43 Kevin Frandsen; 14 Casey McGehee; 21 Nick Noonan; 12 Joe Panik; 37 Kelby Tomlinson	Outfielders: 23 Nori Aoki; 7 Gregor Blanco; 6 Marlon Byrd; 45 Alejandro De Aza; 45 Travis Ishikawa; 50 Ryan Lollis; 43 Justin Maxwell; 16 Ángel Pagán; 47 Jarrett Parker; 8 Hunter Pence; 2 Juan Pérez; 51 Mac Williamson	Manager: 15 Bruce Bochy; Coaches: -- Chad Chop (special assistant); -- Shawon Dunston (special assistant); 33 Steve Decker (assistant hitting); 26 Mark Gardner (bullpen); 58 Bill Hayes (first base); 39 Roberto Kelly (third base); 31 Hensley Meulens (hitting); 19 Dave Righetti (pitching); 99 Taira Uematsu (bullpen catcher); 88 Eli Whiteside (bullpen catcher); 10 Ron Wotus (bench)

== Statistics ==
Through October 4, 2015

=== Batting ===
Note: G = Games played; AB = At bats; R = Runs scored; H = Hits; 2B = Doubles; 3B = Triples; HR = Home runs; RBI = Runs batted in; BB = Base on balls; SO = Strikeouts; AVG = Batting average; SB = Stolen bases

Player	G	AB	R	H	2B	3B	HR	RBI	BB	SO	AVG	SB
Ehíré Adríanza, 2B, SS	52	113	11	21	7	1	0	11	15	20	.186	3
Jeremy Affeldt, P	52	2	0	0	0	0	0	0	0	2	.000	0
Nori Aoki, LF	93	355	42	102	12	3	5	26	30	25	.287	14
Joaquín Árias, SS, 3B, 2B	40	58	5	12	1	0	1	4	0	12	.207	1
Brandon Belt, 1B	137	492	73	138	33	5	18	68	56	147	.280	9
Gregor Blanco, OF	115	327	59	95	19	3	5	26	40	59	.291	13
Trevor Brown, C	13	39	1	9	3	0	0	5	3	8	.231	1
Madison Bumgarner, P	32	77	9	19	2	0	5	9	3	27	.247	0
Marlon Byrd, RF	39	147	12	40	12	2	4	31	6	44	.272	0
Matt Cain, P	13	16	0	0	0	0	0	1	0	9	.000	0
Brandon Crawford, SS	143	507	65	130	33	4	21	84	39	119	.256	6
Alejandro De Aza, LF	24	61	12	16	4	1	0	3	12	14	.262	2
Matt Duffy, 3B	149	573	77	169	28	6	12	77	30	96	.295	12
Kevin Frandsen, 1B	7	11	1	2	0	0	0	0	1	3	.182	0
Chris Heston, P	31	51	1	10	2	0	0	3	0	18	.196	0
Tim Hudson, P	22	38	3	7	2	0	1	1	1	11	.184	0
Travis Ishikawa, LF	6	5	1	0	0	0	0	0	1	3	.000	0
George Kontos, P	73	2	0	0	0	0	0	0	0	2	.000	0
Mike Leake, P	9	17	1	1	0	0	1	3	0	11	.059	0
Tim Lincecum, P	15	21	0	3	1	0	0	0	2	10	.143	0
Ryan Lollis, OF	5	12	0	2	0	0	0	0	1	1	.167	1
Jean Machi, P	33	3	0	0	0	0	0	0	0	2	.000	0
Justin Maxwell, RF	100	249	26	52	8	2	7	26	20	76	.209	2
Casey McGehee, 3B	49	127	7	27	5	0	2	11	11	28	.213	0
Nick Noonan, SS, 1B	14	22	2	2	1	0	1	3	2	8	.091	0
Josh Osich, P	35	1	0	0	0	0	0	0	0	1	.000	0
Ángel Pagán, CF	133	512	55	134	21	3	3	37	32	93	.262	12
Joe Panik, 2B	100	382	59	119	27	2	8	37	38	42	.312	3
Jarrett Parker, OF	21	49	11	17	2	0	6	14	5	21	.347	1
Jake Peavy, P	19	36	5	7	2	0	1	3	1	17	.194	0
Hunter Pence, RF	52	207	30	57	13	1	9	40	16	48	.275	4
Juan Pérez, OF	22	39	5	11	3	0	0	2	1	6	.282	1
Yusmeiro Petit, P	42	9	1	0	0	0	0	0	0	3	.000	0
Buster Posey, C, 1B	150	557	74	177	28	0	19	95	56	52	.318	2
Sergio Romo, P	70	2	0	0	0	0	0	0	0	1	.000	0
Héctor Sánchez, C	28	56	5	10	4	0	1	5	2	14	.179	0
Hunter Strickland, P	55	1	0	0	0	0	0	0	0	1	.000	0
Andrew Susac, C	52	133	14	29	7	2	3	14	14	43	.218	0
Kelby Tomlinson, 2B	54	178	23	54	6	3	2	20	14	40	.303	5
Ryan Vogelsong, P	33	36	3	5	1	0	1	2	1	13	.139	0
Jackson Williams, C	7	10	1	2	1	0	0	1	4	1	.200	1
Mac Williamson, RF	10	32	2	7	0	1	0	1	0	8	.219	0
Team totals	162	5565	696	1486	288	39	136	663	457	1159	.267	93

=== Pitching ===
Note: W = Wins; L = Losses; ERA = Earned run average; G = Games pitched; GS = Games started; SV = Saves; IP = Innings pitched; H = Hits allowed; R = Runs allowed; ER = Earned runs allowed; HR = Home runs allowed; BB = Walks allowed; K = Strikeouts

Player	W	L	ERA	G	GS	SV	IP	H	R	ER	HR	BB	K
Jeremy Affeldt	2	2	5.86	52	0	0	35.1	43	24	23	6	14	21
Brett Bochy	0	0	0.00	4	0	0	3.0	1	0	0	0	1	3
Michael Broadway	0	2	5.19	21	0	0	17.1	20	10	10	1	7	13
Madison Bumgarner	18	9	2.93	32	32	0	218.1	181	73	71	21	39	234
Matt Cain	2	4	5.79	13	11	0	60.2	71	39	39	12	20	41
Santiago Casilla	4	2	2.79	67	0	38	58.0	51	19	18	6	23	62
Cory Gearrin	0	0	4.91	7	0	0	3.2	1	2	2	0	1	5
Cody Hall	0	0	6.48	7	0	0	8.1	10	6	6	1	4	7
Chris Heston	12	11	3.95	31	31	0	177.2	169	82	78	16	64	141
Tim Hudson	8	9	4.44	24	22	0	123.2	134	62	61	13	37	64
George Kontos	4	4	2.33	73	0	0	73.1	57	20	19	9	12	44
Mike Leake	2	5	4.07	9	9	0	55.1	51	25	25	8	15	29
Tim Lincecum	7	4	4.13	15	15	0	76.1	75	37	35	7	38	60
Javier López	1	0	1.60	77	0	0	39.1	19	8	7	1	16	26
Jean Machi	1	0	5.14	33	0	0	35.0	38	21	20	3	14	22
Josh Osich	2	0	2.20	35	0	0	28.2	24	12	7	4	8	27
Jake Peavy	8	6	3.58	19	19	0	110.2	99	45	44	12	25	78
Yusmeiro Petit	1	1	3.67	42	1	1	76.0	75	32	31	11	15	59
Sergio Romo	0	5	2.98	70	0	2	57.1	51	20	19	3	10	71
Hunter Strickland	3	3	2.45	55	0	0	51.1	34	14	14	4	10	50
Ryan Vogelsong	9	11	4.67	33	22	0	135.0	140	76	70	17	58	108
Team totals	84	78	3.72	162	162	41	1444.1	1344	627	597	155	431	1165

== Farm system ==
Level	Team	League	Manager
AAA	Sacramento River Cats	Pacific Coast League	Bob Mariano
AA	Richmond Flying Squirrels	Eastern League	José Alguacil
A-Advanced	San Jose Giants	California League	Russ Morman
A	Augusta GreenJackets	South Atlantic League	Nester Rojas
A-Short Season	Salem-Keizer Volcanoes	Northwest League	Kyle Haines
Rookie	AZL Giants	Arizona League	Henry Cotto
Rookie	DSL Giants	Dominican Summer League	Carlos Valderrama

LEAGUE CHAMPIONS: DSL Giants
