= 2015 San Diego Padres season =

2015 San Diego Padres
- League: National League
- Division: West
- Ballpark: Petco Park
- City: San Diego, California
- Record: 74–88 (.457)
- Divisional place: 4th
- Owners: Ron Fowler
- General managers: A.J. Preller
- Managers: Bud Black (through June 14); Dave Roberts (Acting, June 15); Pat Murphy (Interim, starting June 16)
- Television: Fox Sports San Diego (Dick Enberg, Mark Grant, Mike Pomeranz, Mark Sweeney, Jesse Agler, Kris Budden); Fox Deportes San Diego (Spanish) (Eduardo Ortega, Carlos Hernández)
- Radio: XEPRS-AM ("The Mighty 1090") (Ted Leitner, Bob Scanlan, Jesse Agler); XEMO-AM (Spanish) (Eduardo Otega, Pedro Gutierrez, Juan Angel Avila)

The 2015 San Diego Padres season was their 47th season in MLB and their 11th at Petco Park. General Manager A. J. Preller acquired a new starting outfield in Matt Kemp, Justin Upton and Wil Myers, while adding to an already strong bullpen with All-Star closer Craig Kimbrel. The Padres also signed free agent starting pitcher James Shields. San Diego traded away seven of its top 11 prospects, as rated by Baseball America entering the offseason.

After starting the season 32–33 and six games behind in the National League West, the Padres fired manager Bud Black, who had managed the team for eight-plus seasons. Bench coach Dave Roberts filled in as manager for one game until Pat Murphy was named the interim manager. After spending one season as a third base coach for the Diamondbacks, on October 29, 2015, Andy Green was named manager of the San Diego Padres.

== Offseason ==
October 30: Tim Stauffer and Josh Johnson become free agents.

- Stauffer signed with the Minnesota Twins.
- Johnson re-signed with the Padres.

November 3: Sent 3 players to the minors.

November 18: Signed Benji Gonzalez to a minor league contract.

November 20: Promoted 3 players from the minors, sent 2 to the minors, signed Griff Erickson to a minor league contract and invited him to spring training, and sent Raymond Fuentes to the Kansas City Royals for Kyle Bartsch.

November 26: Blaine Boyer becomes a free agent.

- Boyer signed with the Minnesota Twins.

November 27: Signed Jason Lane to a minor league contract and invited him to spring training.

December 2: Everth Cabrera becomes a free agent.

December 3: Signed Bryant Aragon to a minor league contract.

December 5: Signed Clint Barmes.

December 11: Signed Trayvon Robinson to a minor league contract.

December 15: Signed Brett Wallace to a minor league contract and invited him to spring training.

December 16: Sent Juan Pablo Oramas to the minors.

December 18-December 20: Signed Brandon Morrow and made the following trades:

- Received Matt Kemp, Tim Federowicz, and cash from the Los Angeles Dodgers for Yasmani Grandal, Joe Wieland, and Zach Eflin.
- Received Derek Norris and Seth Streich from the Oakland Athletics for Jesse Hahn and R. J. Alvarez.
- Received Wil Myers, Ryan Hanigan, Jose Castillo, and Gerardo Reyes from the Tampa Bay Rays for René Rivera, Burch Smith, and Jake Bauers.
- Received Justin Upton and Aaron Northcraft from the Atlanta Braves for Jace Peterson, Max Fried, Dustin Peterson, and Mallex Smith.
- Sent Joe Ross and an unnamed player to the Washington Nationals.
- Sent Ryan Hanigan to the Boston Red Sox for Will Middlebrooks.

December 29: Sent Keyvius Sampson to the minors and sent Johnny Barbato to the New York Yankees and received Shawn Kelley.

December 30: Received Brandon Maurer from the Seattle Mariners for Seth Smith.

January 7: Sent Jake Goebbert to the minors and signed Scott Elbert to a minor league contract with an invite to spring training.

January 8: Signed José Valverde and Marcos Mateo to minor league contracts and invited Valverde to spring training.

January 9: Signed Daniel McCutchen to a minor league contract.

January 15: Signed Luis Hernández to a minor league contract.

January 26: Invited 10 players to spring training and signed 2 others to minor league contracts with invites to spring training.

January 31: Signed Wil Nieves to a minor league contract.

February 5: Signed Zach Segovia to a minor league contract.

February 11: Signed James Shields.

April 5: Received Craig Kimbrel and Melvin Upton, Jr. from the Atlanta Braves for Carlos Quentin, Cameron Maybin, and Matt Wisler

== Season standings ==
=== National League West ===
NL West
Team	W	L	Pct.	GB	Home	Road
Los Angeles Dodgers	92	70	.568	—	55‍–‍26	37‍–‍44
San Francisco Giants	84	78	.519	8	47‍–‍34	37‍–‍44
Arizona Diamondbacks	79	83	.488	13	39‍–‍42	40‍–‍41
San Diego Padres	74	88	.457	18	39‍–‍42	35‍–‍46
Colorado Rockies	68	94	.420	24	36‍–‍45	32‍–‍49

=== National League Wild Card ===
Division leaders
Team	W	L	Pct.
St. Louis Cardinals	100	62	.617
Los Angeles Dodgers	92	70	.568
New York Mets	90	72	.556

Wild Card teams (Top 2 teams qualify for postseason)
Team	W	L	Pct.	GB
Pittsburgh Pirates	98	64	.605	+1
Chicago Cubs	97	65	.599	—
San Francisco Giants	84	78	.519	13
Washington Nationals	83	79	.512	14
Arizona Diamondbacks	79	83	.488	18
San Diego Padres	74	88	.457	23
Miami Marlins	71	91	.438	26
Milwaukee Brewers	68	94	.420	29
Colorado Rockies	68	94	.420	29
Atlanta Braves	67	95	.414	30
Cincinnati Reds	64	98	.395	33
Philadelphia Phillies	63	99	.389	34

=== Record vs. opponents ===
2015 National League record Source: MLB Standings Grid – 2015
Team	AZ	ATL	CHC	CIN	COL	LAD	MIA	MIL	NYM	PHI	PIT	SD	SF	STL	WSH	AL
Arizona	—	3–3	2–4	6–1	13–6	6–13	5–2	5–2	2–5	2–4	1–5	9–10	11–8	0–7	3–4	11–9
Atlanta	3–3	—	1–6	3–4	1–6	3–3	10–9	5–2	8–11	11–8	2–4	2–5	3–4	4–2	5–14	6–14
Chicago	4–2	6–1	—	13–6	4–2	3–4	3–3	14–5	7–0	2–5	11–8	3–3	5–2	8–11	4–3	10–10
Cincinnati	1–6	4–3	6–13	—	2–4	1–6	3–4	9–10	0–7	4–2	11–8	2–4	2–5	7–12	5–1	7–13
Colorado	6–13	6–1	2–4	4–2	—	8–11	2–5	5–1	0–7	5–2	1–6	7–12	11–8	3–4	3–3	5–15
Los Angeles	13–6	3–3	4–3	6–1	11–8	—	4–2	4–3	3–4	5–2	1–5	14–5	8–11	2–5	4–2	10–10
Miami	2–5	9–10	3–3	4–3	5–2	2–4	—	4–2	8–11	9–10	1–6	2–5	5–2	1–5	9–10	7–13
Milwaukee	2–5	2–5	5–14	10–9	1–5	3–4	2–4	—	3–3	7–0	10–9	5–2	1–5	6–13	3–4	8–12
New York	5–2	11–8	0–7	7–0	7–0	4–3	11–8	3–3	—	14–5	0–6	2–4	3–3	3–4	11–8	9–11
Philadelphia	4–2	8–11	5–2	2–4	2–5	2–5	10–9	0–7	5–14	—	2–5	5–1	1–5	2–5	7–12	8–12
Pittsburgh	5–1	4–2	8–11	8–11	6–1	5–1	6–1	9–10	6–0	5–2	—	5–2	6–1	9–10	3–4	13–7
San Diego	10–9	5–2	3–3	4–2	12–7	5–14	5–2	2–5	4–2	1–5	2–5	—	8–11	4–3	2–5	7–13
San Francisco	8–11	4–3	2–5	5–2	8–11	11–8	2–5	5–1	3–3	5–1	1–6	11–8	—	2–4	4–3	13–7
St. Louis	7–0	2–4	11–8	12–7	4–3	5–2	5–1	13–6	4–3	5–2	10–9	3–4	4–2	—	4–2	11–9
Washington	4–3	14–5	3–4	1–5	3–3	2–4	10–9	4–3	8–11	12–7	4–3	5–2	3–4	2–4	—	8–12

== Game log ==
Legend
	Padres win
	Padres loss
	Postponement
**Bold**	Padres team member

2015 San Diego Padres game log (74–88)
April (11–12)

#	Date	Opponent	Score	Win	Loss	Save	Attendance	Record	Box
1	April 6	@ Dodgers	3–6	Peralta (1–0)	**Kelley** (0–1)	Hatcher (1)	53,518	0–1	Box
2	April 7	@ Dodgers	7–3	**Benoit** (1–0)	Hatcher (0–1)		40,356	1–1	Box
3	April 8	@ Dodgers	4–7	McCarthy (1–0)	**Cashner** (0–1)	Peralta (1)	52,204	1–2	Box
4	April 9	Giants	0–1 (12)	Kontos (1–0)	**Vincent** (0–1)	Casilla (3)	45,150	1–3	Box
5	April 10	Giants	1–0	**Benoit** (2–0)	Affeldt (0–1)	**Kimbrel** (1)	40,015	2–3	Box
6	April 11	Giants	10–2	**Shields** (1–0)	Bumgarner (1–1)		42,823	3–3	Box
7	April 12	Giants	6–4	**Ross** (1–0)	Peavy (0–1)	**Kimbrel** (2)	40,184	4–3	Box
8	April 13	Diamondbacks	4–8	De La Rosa (2–0)	**Cashner** (0–2)		19,538	4–4	Box
9	April 14	Diamondbacks	5–1	**Despaigne** (1–0)	Hellickson (0–2)		20,102	5–4	Box
10	April 15	Diamondbacks	3–2	**Benoit** (3–0)	Delgado (0–1)	**Kimbrel** (3)	23,104	6–4	Box
11	April 17	@ Cubs	5–4	**Shields** (2–0)	Schlitter (0–1)	**Kimbrel** (4)	32,138	7–4	Box
12	April 18	@ Cubs	6–7 (11)	Rosscup (1–0)	**Kimbrel** (0–1)		33,958	7–5	Box
13	April 19	@ Cubs	5–2	**Cashner** (1–2)	Lester (0–2)	**Benoit** (1)	29,113	8–5	Box
14	April 20	@ Rockies	14–3	**Despaigne** (2–0)	de la Rosa (0–1)		22,586	9–5	Box
15	April 21	@ Rockies	7–6	**Maurer** (1–0)	Logan (0–1)	**Kimbrel** (5)	22,600	10–5	Box
16	April 22	@ Rockies	4–5	Ottavino (1–0)	**Kelley** (0–2)		22,705	10–6	Box
17	April 23	@ Rockies	1–2	Lyles (2–1)	**Ross** (1–1)	Axford (2)	31,676	10–7	Box
18	April 24	Dodgers	0–3	Greinke (3–0)	**Cashner** (1–3)	García (1)	43,055	10–8	Box
19	April 25	Dodgers	8–11	McCarthy (3–0)	**Kennedy** (0–1)		44,454	10–9	Box
20	April 26	Dodgers	3–1	**Morrow** (1–0)	Baker (0–1)	**Kimbrel** (6)	43,256	11–9	Box
21	April 27	Astros	4–9	Neshek (1–0)	**Benoit** (3–1)		19,532	11–10	Box
22	April 28	Astros	3–14	Hernández (1–2)	**Ross** (1–2)		22,796	11–11	Box
23	April 29	Astros	2–7	Keuchel (3–0)	**Cashner** (1–4)		21,824	11–12	Box

May (14–15)

#	Date	Opponent	Score	Win	Loss	Save	Attendance	Record	Box
24	May 1	Rockies	14–3	**Kennedy** (1–1)	Butler (2–2)		30,186	12–12	Box
25	May 2	Rockies	4–2	**Morrow** (2–0)	de la Rosa (0–2)	**Kimbrel** (7)	28,058	13–12	Box
26	May 3	Rockies	8–6	**Shields** (3–0)	Kendrick (1–4)	**Kimbrel** (8)	34,197	14–12	Box
27	May 4	@ Giants	0–2	Bumgarner (3–1)	**Ross** (1–3)	Casilla (8)	41,278	14–13	Box
28	May 5	@ Giants	0–6	Vogelsong (1–2)	**Cashner** (1–5)		41,358	14–14	Box
29	May 6	@ Giants	9–1	**Kennedy** (2–1)	Heston (2–3)		41,060	15–14	Box
30	May 7	@ Diamondbacks	0–11	De La Rosa (3–2)	**Despaigne** (2–1)		16,929	15–15	Box
31	May 8	@ Diamondbacks	6–5	**Shields** (4–0)	Burgos (0–1)	**Kimbrel** (9)	28,677	16–15	Box
32	May 9	@ Diamondbacks	6–4	**Quackenbush** (1–0)	Delgado (1–2)		27,340	17–15	Box
33	May 10	@ Diamondbacks	1–2	Ramirez (1–0)	**Cashner** (1–6)	Reed (2)	24,881	17–16	Box
34	May 12	@ Mariners	4–11	Paxton (1–2)	**Kennedy** (2–2)		16,148	17–17	Box
35	May 13	@ Mariners	4–2	**Shields** (5–0)	Walker (1–4)	**Kimbrel** (10)	14,547	18–17	Box
36	May 14	Nationals	8–3	**Ross** (2–3)	Fister (2–2)		22,710	19–17	Box
37	May 15	Nationals	0–10	Zimmermann (3–2)	**Despaigne** (2–2)	Cole (1)	26,186	19–18	Box
38	May 16	Nationals	1–4	Scherzer (4–3)	**Cashner** (1–7)	Storen (11)	45,282	19–19	Box
39	May 17	Nationals	5–10	Strasburg (3–4)	**Kennedy** (2–3)		37,032	19–20	Box
40	May 19	Cubs	4–3	**Benoit** (4–3)	Russell (0–1)	**Kimbrel** (11)	25,917	20–20	Box
41	May 20	Cubs	2–3	Grimm (1–0)	**Ross** (2–4)	Rondón (9)	25,028	20–21	Box
42	May 21	Cubs	0–3	Hendricks (1–1)	**Despaigne** (2–3)		30,021	20–22	Box
43	May 22	@ Dodgers	1–2	Hatcher (1–3)	**Benoit** (4–2)	Jansen (2)	48,514	20–23	Box
44	May 23	@ Dodgers	2–0	Bolsinger (3–0)	**Kennedy** (2–4)	Jansen (3)	53,479	20–24	Box
45	May 24	@ Dodgers	11–3	**Shields** (6–0)	Frías (3–2)		50,182	21–24	Box
46	May 25	@ Angels	3–4	Smith (1–1)	**Quackenbush** (1–1)		38,055	21–25	Box
47	May 26	@ Angels	4–0	**Thayer** (1–0)	Smith (1–2)		32,334	22–25	Box
48	May 27	@ Angels	5–4	**Cashner** (2–7)	Richards (4–3)	**Kimbrel** (12)	36,180	23–25	Box
49	May 28	Pirates	11–5	Burnett (5–1)	**Kennedy** (2–5)		23,104	23–26	Box
50	May 29	Pirates	6–2	**Kimbrel** (1–1)	Scahill (1–3)		28,317	24–26	Box
51	May 30	Pirates	2–5	Morton (2–0)	**Ross** (2–5)	Melancon (13)	43,207	24–27	Box
52	May 31	Pirates	7–1	**Despaigne** (3–3)	Locke (3–3)		20,556	25–27	Box

June (12–15)

#	Date	Opponent	Score	Win	Loss	Save	Attendance	Record	Box
53	June 1	Mets	0–7	deGrom (6–4)	**Cashner** (2–8)		21,893	25–28	Box
54	June 2	Mets	7–2	**Kennedy** (3–5)	Syndergaard (2–3)		22,264	26–28	Box
55	June 3	Mets	7–3	**Shields** (7–0)	Gee (0–3)		24,398	27–28	Box
56	June 5	@ Reds	6–2	**Ross** (3–5)	Moscot (0–1)		33,381	28–28	Box
57	June 6	@ Reds	9–7	**Maurer** (1–0)	Díaz (2–1)	**Kimbrel** (13)	40,946	29–28	Box
58	June 7	@ Reds	0–4	Cueto (4–4)	**Despaigne** (3–4)		27,501	29–29	Box
59	June 8	@ Braves	5–3 (11)	**Maurer** (3–0)	Martin (2–3)	**Kimbrel** (14)	21,458	30–29	Box
60	June 9	@ Braves	5–6	Johnson (2–3)	**Benoit** (4–3)	Grilli (16)	24,049	30–30	Box
61	June 10	@ Braves	1–4	Perez (2–0)	**Ross** (3–6)	Johnson (3)	21,465	30–31	Box
62	June 11	@ Braves	6–4	**Thayer** (2–0)	Cunniff (2–2)	**Kimbrel** (15)	25,759	31–31	Box
63	June 12	Dodgers	3–4	Garcia (3–2)	**Thayer** (2–1)	Jansen (8)	39,037	31–32	Box
64	June 13	Dodgers	2–1	**Maurer** (4–0)	Greinke (5–2)	**Kimbrel** (16)	43,525	32–32	Box
65	June 14	Dodgers	2–4 (12)	Ravin (2–0)	**Thayer** (2–2)	Jansen (9)	40,056	32–33	Box
66	June 15	Athletics	1–9	Hahn (4–5)	**Ross** (3–7)		30,018	32–34	Box
67	June 16	Athletics	6–5	Scribner (2–1)	**Kimbrel** (1–2)	Clippard (10)	28,482	32–35	Box
68	June 17	@ Athletics	2–16	Chavez (3–6)	**Despaigne** (3–5)		20,625	32–36	Box
69	June 18	@ Athletics	3–1	**Kennedy** (4–5)	Graveman (3–4)	**Kimbrel** (17)	16,643	33–36	Box
70	June 19	@ Diamondbacks	2–4	De La Rosa (6–3)	**Shields** (7–1)	Ziegler (10)	27,394	33–37	Box
71	June 20	@ Diamondbacks	2–1	**Ross** (4–7)	Ray (2–2)		33,649	34–37	Box
72	June 21	@ Diamondbacks	7–2	Hellickson (5–4)	**Cashner** (2–9)		35,590	34–38	Box
73	June 23	@ Giants	3–2	**Maurer** (5–0)	Strickland (0–1)	**Kimbrel** (18)	42,067	35–38	Box
74	June 24	@ Giants	0–6	Vogelsong (6–5)	**Kennedy** (4–6)		41,744	35–39	Box
75	June 25	@ Giants	8–13	Heston (8–5)	**Shields** (7–2)		41,533	35–40	Box
76	June 26	Diamondbacks	4–2	**Ross** (5–7)	Ray (2–3)	**Kimbrel** (19)	30,317	36–40	Box
77	June 27	Diamondbacks	7–2	**Cashner** (3–9)	Hellickson (5–5)		40,717	37–40	Box
78	June 28	Diamondbacks	6–4	Anderson (4–2)	**Despaigne** (3–6)	Ziegler (12)	32,223	37–41	Box
79	June 30	Mariners	0–5	Montgomery (3–2)	**Kennedy** (4–7)		30,368	37–42	Box

July (13–10)

#	Date	Opponent	Score	Win	Loss	Save	Attendance	Record	Box
80	July 1	Mariners	0–7	Walker (7–6)	**Shields** (7–3)		30,251	37–43	Box
81	July 2	@ Cardinals	5–3	**Kelley** (1–2)	Villanueva (3–3)	**Kimbrel** (20)	42,926	38–43	Box
82	July 3	@ Cardinals	1–2	**Benoit** (5–3)	Rosenthal (1–1)	**Kimbrel** (21)	47,330	39–43	Box
83	July 4	@ Cardinals	1–2	Maness (3–0)	**Maurer** (5–1)	Rosenthal (24)	44,690	39–44	Box
84	July 5	@ Cardinals	1–3	Lynn (6–4)	**Kennedy** (4–8)	Siegrist (4)	42,764	39–45	Box
85	July 6	@ Pirates	1–2	Hughes (2–1)	**Maurer** (5–2)		23,182	39–46	Box
86	July 7	@ Pirates	2–3	Watson (2–1)	**Benoit** (5–4)	Melancon (38)	21,887	39–47	Box
87	July 8	@ Pirates	2–5	Guerra (2–0)	**Cashner** (3–10)	Bastardo (1)	25,035	39–48	Box
88	July 10	@ Rangers	3–4	Rodríguez (3–4)	**Kennedy** (4–9)	Tolleson (13)	33,033	39–49	Box
89	July 11	@ Rangers	6–5	**Benoit** (6–4)	Tolleson (2–2)	**Kimbrel** (22)	36,248	40–49	Box
90	July 12	@ Rangers	2–1	**Ross** (6–7)	Gallardo (7–8)	**Kimbrel** (23)	32,428	41–49	Box
**July 13–15: All-Star Break at Great American Ball Park in Cincinnati**
91	July 17	Rockies	4–2	**Shields** (8–3)	de la Rosa (6–4)	Kimbrel (24)	31,025	42–49	Box
92	July 18	Rockies	5–4	**Maurer** (6–2)	Friedrich (0–2)	Kimbrel (25)	32,245	43–49	Box
–	July 19	Rockies	Suspended in 4th inning (rain from Hurricane Dolores). Makeup date: September 10.						
93	July 20	Giants	4–2	**Kennedy** (5–9)	Hudson (5–8)	**Kimbrel** (26)	35,033	44–49	Box
94	July 21	Giants	3–9	Heston (10–5)	**Despaigne** (3–7)		35,596	44–50	Box
95	July 22	Giants	1–7	Cain (2–1)	**Maurer** (6–3)		38,435	44–51	Box
96	July 23	Marlins	0–4	Koehler (8–6)	**Ross** (6–8)		29,345	44–52	Box
97	July 24	Marlins	3–1	**Cashner** (4–10)	Haren (7–6)	**Kimbrel** (27)	25,897	45–52	Box
98	July 25	Marlins	3–1	**Kennedy** (6–9)	Phelps (4–7)	**Kimbrel** (28)	37,300	46–52	Box
99	July 26	Marlins	3–2	**Despaigne** (4–7)	Latos (4–7)	**Kimbrel** (29)	33,292	47–52	Box
100	July 28	@ Mets	0–4	Syndergaard (5–5)	**Shields** (8–4)		26,034	47–53	Box
101	July 29	@ Mets	7–3	**Ross** (7–8)	Colón (9–10)		24,804	48–53	Box
102	July 30	@ Mets	8–7	**Mateo** (1–0)	Familia (2–1)	**Kimbrel** (30)	35,604	49–53	Box
103	July 31	@ Marlins	8–3	**Maurer** (7–3)	Ramos (0–3)		19,582	50–53	Box

August (13–11)

#	Date	Opponent	Score	Win	Loss	Save	Attendance	Record	Box
104	August 1	@ Marlins	5–3	**Despaigne** (5–7)	Ureña (1–5)	**Kimbrel** (31)	21,614	51–53	Box
105	August 2	@ Marlins	5–2	Ramos (1–3)	**Maurer** (7–4)		25,228	51–54	Box
106	August 3	@ Brewers	13–5	**Ross** (8–8)	Peralta (2–6)		20,888	52–54	Box
107	August 4	@ Brewers	1–4	Nelson (9–9)	**Cashner** (4–11)	Rodriguez (24)	23,616	52–55	Box
108	August 5	@ Brewers	5–8	Jungmann (6–3)	**Kennedy** (6–10)	Rodriguez (25)	22,975	52–56	Box
109	August 6	@ Brewers	1–10	Garza (6–12)	**Despaigne** (5–8)		28,789	52–57	Box
110	August 7	Phillies	3–4	Neris (2–0)	**Quacken-** **bush** (2–1)	Giles (4)	31,334	52–58	Box
111	August 8	Phillies	2–4	Morgan (3–3)	**Ross** (8–9)	Giles (5)	44,567	52–59	Box
112	August 9	Phillies	3–5	Williams (4–8)	**Cashner** (4–12)	Giles (6)	24,156	52–60	Box
113	August 10	Reds	2–1	**Kennedy** (7–10)	Holmberg (1–1)	**Kimbrel** (32)	23,223	53–60	Box
114	August 11	Reds	11–6	**Rea** (1–0)	Lorenzen (3–8)		26,588	54–60	Box
115	August 12	Reds	3–7	Iglesias (3–4)	**Shields** (8–5)		21,397	54–61	Box
116	August 14	@ Rockies	9–5	**Norris** (3–9)	Roberts (0–1)		33,697	55–61	Box
117	August 15	@ Rockies	9–7	**Quacken-** **bush** (2–2)	Kahnle (0–1)	**Kimbrel** (33)	37,554	56–61	Box
118	August 16	@ Rockies	0–5	Rusin (4–5)	**Kennedy** (7–11)		26,927	56–62	Box
119	August 17	Braves	5–3	**Rea** (2–0)	Perez (4–4)	**Kimbrel** (34)	23,716	57–62	Box
120	August 18	Braves	9–0	**Shields** (9–5)	Wisler (5–3)		28,395	58–62	Box
121	August 19	Braves	3–2	**Kelley** (2–2)	Marksberry (0–2)	**Kimbrel** (35)	20,732	59–62	Box
122	August 21	Cardinals	9–3	**Cashner** (5–12)	Lackey (10–8)		32,734	60–62	Box
123	August 22	Cardinals	8–0	**Kennedy** (8–11)	Martínez (12–6)		44,816	61–62	Box
124	August 23	Cardinals	3–10	Wacha (15–4)	**Rea** (2–1)		33,756	61–63	Box
125	August 25	@ Nationals	3–8	Strasburg (8–6)	**Shields** (9–6)		34,199	61–64	Box
126	August 26	@ Nationals	6–5	**Ross** (9–9)	Gonzalez (9–7)	**Kimbrel** (36)	29,332	62-64	Box
127	August 27	@ Nationals	2–4	Ross (5–5)	**Cashner** (5–13)	Papelbon (21)	28,908	62–65	Box
128	August 28	@ Phillies	1–7	Nola (5–1)	**Kennedy** (8–12)	Williams (1)	25,145	62–66	Box
129	August 29	@ Phillies	3–4	Morgan (5–4)	**Rea** (2–2)	Giles (11)	22,090	62–67	Box
130	August 30	@ Phillies	9–4	**Shields** (10–6)	Asher (0–1)		22,624	63–67	Box
131	August 31	Rangers	7–0	**Ross** (10–9)	Lewis (14–7)		19,013	64–67	Box

September (9–18)

#	Date	Opponent	Score	Win	Loss	Save	Attendance	Record	Box
132	September 1	Rangers	6–8	Ohlendorf (2–0)	**Rzepczyn-** **ski** (2–4)		21,215	64–68	Box
133	September 2	Rangers	3–4 (10)	Dyson (5–4)	**Norris** (3–10)		18,730	64–69	Box
134	September 3	Dodgers	7–10	**Quacken-** **bush** (3–2)	Johnson (2–6)	**Benoit** (2)	33,505	65–69	Box
135	September 4	Dodgers	4–8	Bolsinger (6–3)	**Mateo** (1–1)		33,025	65–70	Box
136	September 5	Dodgers	0–2	Wood (10–9)	**Ross** (10–10)	Jansen (29)	43,536	65–71	Box
137	September 6	Dodgers	1–5	Anderson (9–8)	**Cashner** (5–14)		37,685	65–72	Box
138	September 7	Rockies	4–6	Kendrick (5–12)	**Kennedy** (8–13)	Axford (20)	24,585	65–73	Box
139	September 8	Rockies	2–1	**Kimbrel** (2–2)	Logan (0–3)		19,112	66–73	Box
140	September 9	Rockies	11–4	**Shields** (11–6)	Rusin (5–8)		22,764	67–73	Box
141	September 10	Rockies	3–4	Miller (2–2)	**Benoit** (6–5)	Axford (21)	21,922	67–74	Box
142	September 11	@ Giants	1–9	Peavy (6–6)	**Cashner** (6–15)		41,621	67–75	Box
143	September 12	@ Giants	0–8	Bumgarner (18–7)	**Kennedy** (8–14)		41,564	67–76	Box
144	September 13	@ Giants	3–10	Leake (10–8)	**Despaigne** (5–9)		41,397	67–77	Box
145	September 14	@ Diamondbacks	10–3	**Shields** (12–6)	Hellickson (9–9)		15,951	68–77	Box
146	September 15	@ Diamondbacks	4–6	Delgado (6–4)	**Norris** (3–11)	Ziegler (26)	17,531	68–78	Box
147	September 16	@ Diamondbacks	4–3	**Cashner** (6–15)	Ray (4–12)	**Kimbrel** (37)	18,767	69–78	Box
148	September 18	@ Rockies	4–7	Bettis (8–5)	**Kennedy** (6–15)	Axford (24)	27,303	69–79	Box
149	September 19	@ Rockies	2–10	Bergman (3–0)	**Erlin** (0–1)		30,875	69–80	Box
150	September 20	@ Rockies	10–4	**Shields** (13–6)	Kendrick (6–13)		26,927	70–80	Box
151	September 22	Giants	2–4	Kontos (4–2)	**Ross** (10–11)	Casilla (35)	25,043	70–81	Box
152	September 23	Giants	5–4	**Kimbrel** (3–2)	Kontos (4–3)		23,556	71–81	Box
153	September 24	Giants	5–4	**Kimbrel** (4–2)	Broadway (0–2)		31,137	72–81	Box
154	September 25	Diamondbacks	3–6	De La Rosa (14–8)	**Kelly** (0–1)	Ziegler (28)	24,179	72–82	Box
155	September 26	Diamondbacks	3–0	**Erlin** (1–1)	Hellickson (9–11)	**Kimbrel** (38)	32,186	73–82	Box
156	September 27	Diamondbacks	2–4	Chacín (2–1)	**Shields** (13–7)	Ziegler (29)	24,179	73–83	Box
157	September 29	Brewers	3–4	López (1–0)	**Ross** (10–12)	Rodriguez (38)	36,047	73–84	Box
158	September 30	Brewers	0–5	Davies (3–2)	**Cashner** (6–16)		30,514	73–85	Box

October (1–3)

#	Date	Opponent	Score	Win	Loss	Save	Attendance	Record	Box
159	October 1	Brewers	3–1	**Kennedy** (9–15)	Jungmann (9–8)	**Kimbrel** (39)	22,129	74–85	Box
160	October 2	@ Dodgers	2–6	Wood (12–12)	**Kelly** (0–2)		45,564	74–86	Box
161	October 3	@ Dodgers	1–2	Greinke (19–3)	**Erlin** (1–2)	Jansen (36)	52,352	74–87	Box
162	October 4	@ Dodgers	3–6	**Peralta** (3–1)	Garcés (0–1)	Hatcher (4)	42,863	74–88	Box

== Roster ==
2015 San Diego Padres
Roster
Pitchers: 53 Joaquín Benoit; 57 Leonel Campos; 34 Andrew Cashner; 40 Odrisamer Despaigne; 43 Jon Edwards; 41 Robbie Erlin; 60 Frank Garcés; 25 Jay Jackson; 56 Shawn Kelley; 49 Casey Kelly; 22 Ian Kennedy; 46 Craig Kimbrel; 54 Marcos Mateo; 37 Brandon Maurer; 43 Cory Mazzoni; 21 Brandon Morrow; 20 Bud Norris; 59 Kevin Quackenbush; 29 Colin Rea; 62 Chris Rearick; 38 Tyson Ross; 45 Marc Rzepczynski; 33 James Shields; 44 Dale Thayer; 50 Nick Vincent	Catchers: 58 Rocky Gale; 18 Austin Hedges; 7 Wil Nieves; 3 Derek Norris; Infielders: 23 Yonder Alonso; 5 Alexi Amarista; 12 Clint Barmes; 28 Cody Decker; 9 Jedd Gyorko; 11 Will Middlebrooks; 26 Yangervis Solarte; 15 Cory Spangenberg; 39 Brett Wallace	Outfielders: 16 Abraham Almonte; 1 Alex Dickerson; 16 Travis Jankowski; 27 Matt Kemp; 4 Wil Myers; 10 Justin Upton; 2 Melvin Upton; 25 Will Venable	Manager: 20 Bud Black; 24 Pat Murphy; 8 Dave Roberts; Coaches: 36 Darren Balsley (pitching); 81 Griffin Benedict (bullpen catcher); 47 Willie Blair (bullpen); 80 Justin Hatcher (bullpen catcher); 30 Glenn Hoffman (third base); 14 Mark Kotsay (hitting); 32 Alonzo Powell (assistant hitting); 8 Dave Roberts (bench); 17 José Valentín (first base)

== Player stats ==
Both tables are sortable.

=== Batting ===
Note: G = Games played; AB = At bats; R = Runs scored; H = Hits; 2B = Doubles; 3B = Triples; HR = Home runs; RBI = Runs batted in; AVG = Batting average; SB = Stolen bases

Player	G	AB	R	H	2B	3B	HR	RBI	AVG	SB
Abraham Almonte	31	54	6	11	3	0	0	4	.204	1
Yonder Alonso	103	354	50	100	18	1	5	31	.282	2
Alexi Amarista	118	324	28	66	10	4	3	30	.204	5
Clint Barmes	98	207	24	48	14	1	3	16	.232	0
Cody Decker	8	11	0	0	0	0	0	1	.000	0
Alex Dickerson	11	8	0	2	0	0	0	0	.250	0
Rocky Gale	11	10	0	1	0	0	0	0	.100	0
Jedd Gyorko	128	421	34	104	15	0	16	57	.247	0
Austin Hedges	56	137	13	23	2	0	3	11	.168	0
Travis Jankowski	34	90	9	19	2	2	2	12	.211	2
Matt Kemp	154	596	80	158	31	3	23	100	.265	12
Will Middlebrooks	83	255	23	54	7	2	9	29	.212	2
Wil Myers	60	225	40	57	13	1	8	29	.253	5
Wil Nieves	6	13	1	1	0	0	1	4	.077	0
Derek Norris	147	515	65	129	33	2	14	62	.250	4
Yangervis Solarte	152	526	63	142	33	4	14	63	.270	1
Cory Spangenberg	108	303	38	82	17	5	4	21	.271	9
Justin Upton	150	542	85	136	26	3	26	81	.251	19
Melvin Upton	87	205	23	53	12	4	5	17	.259	9
Will Venable	98	283	34	73	10	3	6	30	.258	11
Brett Wallace	64	96	14	29	6	0	5	16	.302	0
Pitcher totals	162	282	20	36	8	1	1	9	.128	0
Team totals	162	5457	650	1324	260	36	148	623	.243	82

=== Pitching ===
Note: W = Wins; L = Losses; ERA = Earned run average; G = Games pitched; GS = Games started; SV = Saves; IP = Innings pitched; H = Hits allowed; R = Runs allowed; ER = Earned runs allowed; BB = Walks allowed; K = Strikeouts

Player	W	L	ERA	G	GS	SV	IP	H	R	ER	BB	K
Alexi Amarista	0	0	0.00	1	0	0	0.1	0	0	0	0	0
Joaquín Benoit	6	5	2.34	67	0	2	65.1	36	17	17	23	63
Leonel Campos	0	0	9.00	1	0	0	1.0	1	1	1	1	1
Andrew Cashner	6	16	4.34	31	31	0	184.2	200	111	89	66	165
Odrisamer Despaigne	5	9	5.80	34	18	0	125.2	142	82	81	32	69
Jon Edwards	0	0	3.38	11	0	0	10.2	6	4	4	8	16
Robbie Erlin	1	2	4.76	3	3	0	17.0	16	9	9	2	10
Frank Garcés	0	1	5.21	40	1	0	38.0	41	23	22	22	30
Jay Jackson	0	0	6.23	6	0	0	4.1	7	3	3	1	4
Shawn Kelley	2	2	2.45	53	0	0	51.1	41	18	14	15	63
Casey Kelly	0	2	7.94	3	2	0	11.1	19	13	10	3	7
Ian Kennedy	9	15	4.28	30	30	0	168.1	166	95	80	52	174
Craig Kimbrel	4	2	2.58	61	0	39	59.1	40	19	17	22	87
Marcos Mateo	1	1	4.00	26	0	0	27.0	22	16	12	9	33
Brandon Maurer	7	4	3.00	53	0	0	51.0	39	19	17	15	39
Cory Mazzoni	0	0	20.77	8	0	0	8.2	23	22	20	5	8
Brandon Morrow	2	0	2.73	5	5	0	33.0	29	10	10	7	23
Bud Norris	1	2	5.40	20	0	0	16.2	16	11	10	6	21
Kevin Quackenbush	3	2	4.01	57	0	0	58.1	52	28	26	20	58
Colin Rea	2	2	4.26	6	6	0	31.2	29	16	15	11	26
Chris Rearick	0	0	12.00	5	0	0	3.0	6	4	4	2	4
Tyson Ross	10	12	3.26	33	33	0	196.0	172	78	71	84	212
Marc Rzepczynski	0	1	7.36	27	0	0	14.2	17	14	12	4	17
James Shields	13	7	3.91	33	33	0	202.1	189	93	88	81	216
Dale Thayer	2	2	4.06	38	0	0	37.2	37	17	17	15	25
Nick Vincent	0	1	2.35	26	0	0	23.0	25	8	6	10	22
Team totals	74	88	4.09	162	162	41	1440.1	1371	731	655	516	1393

== Farm system ==
Level	Team	League	Manager
AAA	El Paso Chihuahuas	Pacific Coast League	Jaime Quirk
AA	San Antonio Missions	Texas League	Rod Barajas
A-Advanced	Lake Elsinore Storm	California League	Michael Collins
A	Fort Wayne TinCaps	Midwest League	Randy Ready
A-Short Season	Tri-City Dust Devils	Northwest League	Freddie Ocasio
Rookie	AZL Padres	Arizona League	Rod Barajas
Rookie	DSL Padres	Dominican Summer League	Evaristo Lantigua

== Farm system ==
(Updated as of August 7th, 2015.)

Level	Team	League	Manager	W	L	Position
AAA	El Paso Chihuahuas	Pacific Coast League	Pat Murphy; Jamie Quirk	58	54	2nd place PCL American South; 5.5 GB
AA	San Antonio Missions	Texas League	Rod Barajas	16	25	4th place TX South; 11 GB (second half)
High A	Lake Elsinore Storm	California League	Michael Collins	10	30	5th place 12.5 GB; Cal South (second half)
A	Fort Wayne TinCaps	Midwest League	Randy Ready	24	16	1st place MID East (second half)
Rookie	Tri-City Dust Devils	Northwest League	Freddie Ocasio	5	3	1st place NW North (second half)
Rookie	Arizona League Padres	Arizona League	Rod Barajas	4	4	3rd place AZL West; 2.5 GB (second half)
Rookie	Dominican Summer Padres	Dominican Summer League	Evaristo Lantigua	26	33	5th place DSL BC; 10.0 GB
