= Jackson Williams =

American baseball player (born 1986)

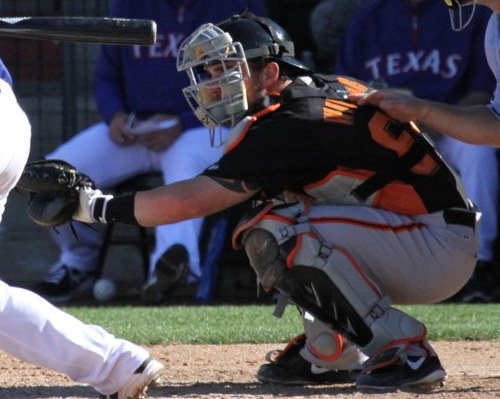
- Williams with the San Francisco Giants in 2013
- Catcher
- Born: May 14, 1986 (age 40); Tulsa, Oklahoma, U.S.
- Batted: Right Threw: Right

MLB debut
- August 27, 2014, for the Colorado Rockies

Last MLB appearance
- October 4, 2015, for the San Francisco Giants

MLB statistics
- Batting average: .208
- Home runs: 1
- Runs batted in: 4
- Stats at Baseball Reference

Teams
- Colorado Rockies (2014); San Francisco Giants (2015)

Jackson Thomas Williams (born May 14, 1986) is an American former professional baseball catcher. He played in Major League Baseball (MLB) for the Colorado Rockies and San Francisco Giants in 2014 and 2015.

== Career ==
=== Amateur ===
Williams played college baseball at the University of Oklahoma. In 2005, he played collegiate summer baseball with the Yarmouth–Dennis Red Sox of the Cape Cod Baseball League, and returned to the league in 2006 to play for the Hyannis Mets.

=== San Francisco Giants ===
Williams was drafted by the San Francisco Giants in the first round of the 2007 Major League Baseball draft. He made his professional debut with the Low–A Salem-Keizer Volcanoes, hitting .231 with five home runs and 20 RBI in 42 games. Williams split the 2008 season between the Single–A Augusta GreenJackets and High–A San Jose Giants, batting a cumulative .205/.292/.292 with five home runs and 29 RBI spanning 97 appearances.

In 2009, Williams made 105 appearances for the Double–A Connecticut Defenders, slashing .223/.316/.310 with two home runs, 24 RBI, and one stolen base. He split the 2010 campaign between the Double–A Richmond Flying Squirrels and Triple–A Fresno Grizzlies, posting a combined .204/.321/.308 slash line with five home runs and 31 RBI.

In 2011, Williams made 74 appearances split between Richmond and Fresno, hitting .191 with four home runs and 21 RBI. He played in 86 contests for Fresno in 2012, batting .247/.281/.417 with career–highs in home runs (11) and RBI (40); In 2013 with the Grizzlies, Williams hit .230 with five home runs and 30 RBI across 85 games.

=== Colorado Rockies ===
On November 17, 2013, Williams signed a minor league contract with the Colorado Rockies organization. Williams was promoted to the major leagues for the first time on June 22, 2014, after Michael McKenry was placed on the bereavement list. He made seven appearances for the Rockies, going 3-for-14 (.214) with one home run and three RBI.

=== San Francisco Giants (second stint) ===
On October 22, 2014, Williams was claimed off waivers by the Los Angeles Angels of Anaheim. He was designated for assignment alongside Michael Roth on November 20. On November 25, Williams cleared waivers and was sent outright to the Triple-A Salt Lake Bees.

On March 17, 2015, Williams was traded to the San Francisco Giants (the team who originally drafted him in the first round in 2007) in exchange for cash considerations. He was assigned to the Double-A Richmond Flying Squirrels to begin the year. On September 6, the Giants added Williams to their active roster, due to an injury suffered by Andrew Susac. He appeared in seven games for San Francisco, recording two hits and four walks in 14 plate appearances. On October 19, Williams was removed from the 40-man roster and sent outright to the Triple-A Sacramento River Cats.

=== Colorado Rockies (second stint) ===
On November 10, 2015, Williams signed a minor league contract with the Colorado Rockies organization. He split the 2016 campaign between the Double–A Hartford Yard Goats and Triple–A Albuquerque Isotopes, hitting .199/.265/.263 with one home run and 20 RBI across 68 total games. Williams elected free agency following the season on November 7, 2016.

=== Pittsburgh Pirates ===
Williams split the 2017 season between the Double–A Altoona Curve and Triple–A Indianapolis Indians. In 55 total games, he batted .201/.276/.249 with 2 home runs and 10 RBI. He elected free agency following the season on November 6, 2017.

On December 24, 2017, Williams re–signed with the Pirates on a new minor league contract. He played in 26 games split between Altoona and Indianapolis, accumulating a .221/.277/.314 batting line with two home runs and 10 RBI. Williams elected free agency following the season on November 2, 2018.
