= Frank Garcés =

Dominican baseball player (born 1990)

Barrie Baycats – No. 97
- Pitcher
- Born: January 17, 1990 (age 36); San Cristobal, Dominican Republic
- Bats: Left Throws: Left

Professional debut
- MLB: August 19, 2014, for the San Diego Padres
- NPB: May 3, 2017, for the Saitama Seibu Lions

MLB statistics (through 2015 season)
- Win–loss record: 0–1
- Earned run average: 4.60
- Strikeouts: 40

NPB statistics (through 2017 season)
- Win–loss record: 2-2
- Earned run average: 6.39
- Strikeouts: 21
- Stats at Baseball Reference

Teams
- San Diego Padres (2014–2015); Saitama Seibu Lions (2017)

Frank Yeury Garcés Ochoa (born January 17, 1990) is a Dominican professional baseball pitcher for the Barrie Baycats of the Canadian Baseball League. He has previously played in Major League Baseball (MLB) for the San Diego Padres and in Nippon Professional Baseball (NPB) for the Saitama Seibu Lions.

== Professional career ==
=== Texas Rangers ===
Garcés signed with the Texas Rangers organization as an international free agent on May 29, 2009. He was assigned to the Dominican Summer League Rangers and appeared in eight games, posting a 0–2 win–loss record, 4.96 earned run average (ERA), and 12 strikeouts in 16 1/3 innings pitched.

=== San Diego Padres ===
Garcés was released by the Rangers organization on September 26, 2009, and signed with the San Diego Padres organization on May 12, 2011. Assigned to the Dominican Summer League Padres for the 2011 season, Garcés pitched to a 4–3 record, 2.51 ERA, and 115 strikeouts in 71 2/3 innings.

In 2012, Garcés was promoted to the Class-A Fort Wayne TinCaps and made 25 starts for the team. In a career-high 121 2/3 innings, he posted a 9–6 record, 2.81 ERA, and 112 strikeouts. Garcés continued to progress through the Padres minor league organization, pitching the entire 2013 season with the Advanced-A Lake Elsinore Storm. He struggled in his 26 starts, going 7–9 with a 5.67 ERA and 126 strikeouts. In the offseason, Garcés played with the Toros del Este of the Dominican Winter League. He was assigned to the Double-A San Antonio Missions in 2014, where he posted a 2–5 record, 1.94 ERA, and 74 strikeouts in 51 relief appearances.

==== Major Leagues ====
Garcés was called up to MLB for the first time on August 19, 2014. He was optioned to Double-A on August 23, after making two scoreless appearances for San Diego. Garcés was recalled in September and made 15 relief appearances for the Padres in 2014, with a 2.00 ERA and 10 strikeouts. Garcés returned to the Toros del Este in the offseason. In 2015, he made 40 appearances for the Padres, and posted a 0–1 win–loss record, 5.21 ERA, and 30 strikeouts in 38 innings. He also made 19 appearances for the Triple-A El Paso Chihuahuas in 2015, going 1–0 with a 2.91 ERA and 17 strikeouts. On December 2, 2015, Garcés was non–tendered by the Padres, making him a free agent.

On December 6, 2015, Garces re–signed with Padres organization on a minor league contract. He spent the entire 2016 season in Triple–A El Paso, working to a 6–8 record and 4.41 ERA with 98 strikeouts over 114 1/3 innings pitched. Garces elected free agency following the season on November 7, 2016.

=== Saitama Seibu Lions ===
On November 17, 2016, Garcés signed a minor league contract with the Miami Marlins organization.

On December 14, 2016, Garcés signed a one-year, 60 million yen contract with the Saitama Seibu Lions of Nippon Professional Baseball. Garcés recorded a 2–2 record and 6.39 ERA in 18 appearances for the Lions in 2017. On October 25, 2017, he became a free agent.

=== Barrie Baycats ===
On June 14, 2018, Garcés made his debut with the Barrie Baycats of the Intercounty Baseball League. In seven starts for the team, Garcés compiled a 7–0 record and 0.38 ERA with 58 strikeouts over 47 innings of work.

=== Algodoneros de Unión Laguna ===
On April 3, 2019, Garcés signed with the Algodoneros de Unión Laguna of the Mexican League. He was released by the Algodoneros on July 15.

=== Piratas de Campeche ===
On July 17, 2019, Garcés signed with the Piratas de Campeche of the Mexican League. He was released by the Piratas on February 11, 2020.

=== Barrie Baycats (second stint) ===
On March 1, 2021, Garcés signed with the Barrie Baycats of the Intercounty Baseball League.

=== Pericos de Puebla ===
On July 8, 2021, Garcés signed with the Pericos de Puebla of the Mexican League. He was released by the team on October 20.

=== Barrie Baycats (third stint) ===
On December 23, 2021, Garcés signed with the Barrie Baycats of the Intercounty Baseball League. He made five starts for the Baycats in 2022, posting a 2–3 record and 3.48 ERA with 39 strikeouts over 31 innings pitched. Garcés pitched in 10 games (all starts) for Barrie in 2023, compiling a 6–1 record and 2.47 ERA with 83 strikeouts across 72 2/3 innings pitched.

Garcés made 12 appearances (11 starts) for the team during the 2024 campaign, registering a 7–2 record and 2.35 ERA with 81 strikeouts across 80 1/3 innings pitched. On October 24, 2024, Garcés re-signed with the Baycats. He made 14 appearances (12 starts) for Barrie in 2025, logging a 5–3 record and 2.22 ERA with 116 strikeouts over 89 innings of work.

On December 5, 2025, Garcés re-signed with the Baycats, now part of the newly rebranded Canadian Baseball League.
