= Mike Broadway =

American baseball player (born 1987)

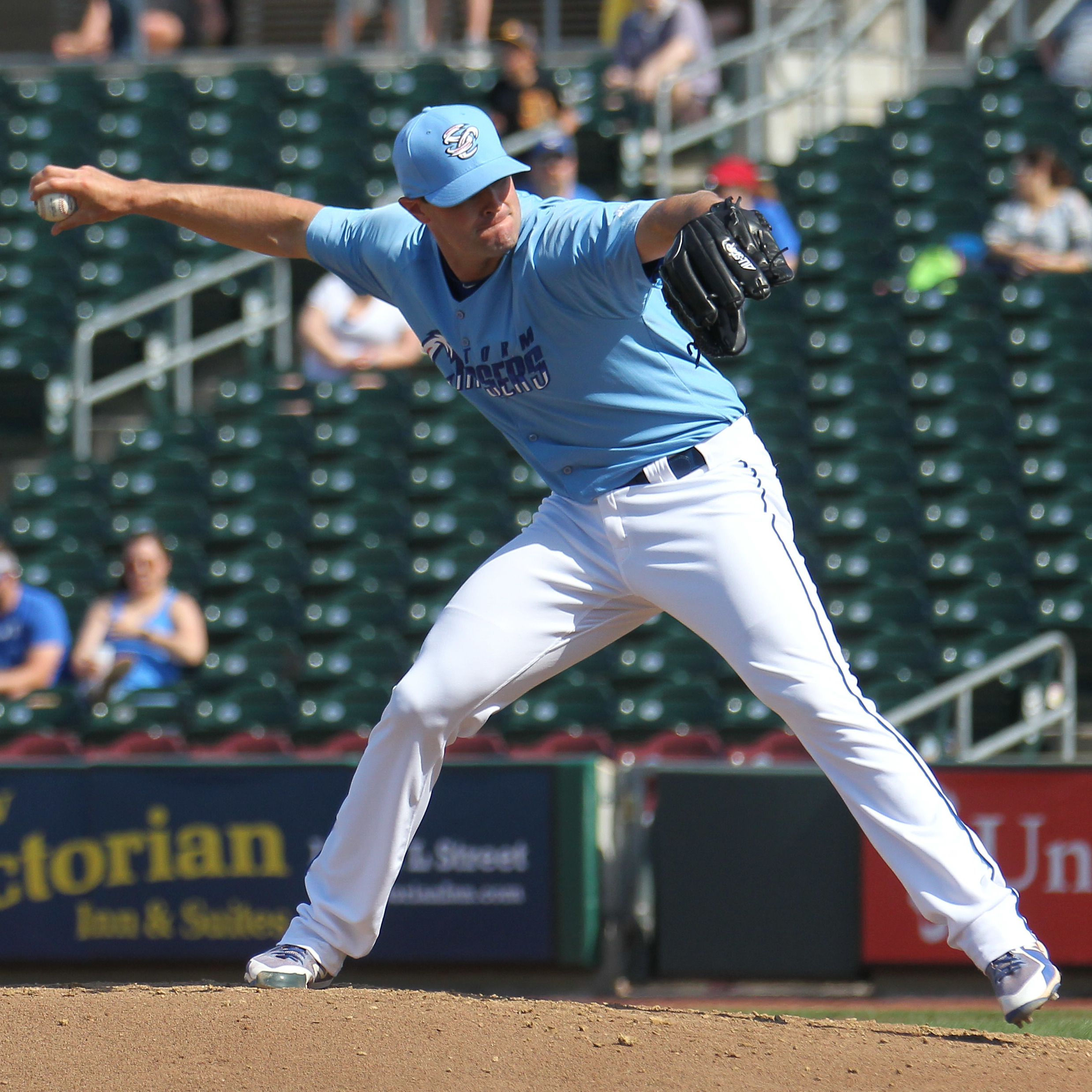
- Broadway with the Omaha Storm Chasers in 2018

Free agent
- Pitcher
- Born: March 30, 1987 (age 38); Paducah, Kentucky, U.S.
- Batted: Right Threw: Right

Professional debut
- MLB: June 13, 2015, for the San Francisco Giants
- NPB: August 17, 2016, for the Yokohama DeNA BayStars

Last MLB appearance
- April 29, 2016, for the San Francisco Giants

MLB statistics (through 2015 season)
- Win–loss record: 0–2
- Earned run average: 6.75
- Strikeouts: 17

NPB statistics (through 2016 season)
- Win–loss record: 0–0
- Earned run average: 4.50
- Strikeouts: 3
- Stats at Baseball Reference

Teams
- San Francisco Giants (2015–2016); Yokohama DeNA BayStars (2016)

Michael Allen Broadway (born March 30, 1987) is an American professional baseball pitcher who is a free agent. He has previously played in Major League Baseball (MLB) for the San Francisco Giants and in Nippon Professional Baseball (NPB) for the Yokohama DeNA BayStars.

== Career ==
=== Atlanta Braves ===
Broadway was drafted by the Atlanta Braves in the fourth round of the 2005 Major League Baseball draft out of Pope County High School in Golconda, Illinois. He made his professional debut with the rookie-level Gulf Coast League Braves. In 2006, Broadway played for the rookie-level Danville Braves, recording a 4–0 record and 3.25 ERA with 18 strikeouts over 36 innings of work. The next year, he played for the Single-A Rome Braves, registering an 11–6 record and 5.25 ERA with 50 strikeouts in 29 appearances. Broadway split the 2008 season between Rome and the High-A Myrtle Beach Pelicans, accumulating a 4.01 ERA and 2–5 record with 54 strikeouts and two saves through 37 combined appearances.

In 2009, Broadway split the year between Myrtle Beach and the Double-A Mississippi Braves, pitching to a 2–7 record and 3.90 ERA with 57 strikeouts in 39 games. In 2010, Broadway split the year between Mississippi and the Triple-A Gwinnett Braves, posting a 5–1 record and 4.39 ERA with 57 strikeouts across 53 1/3 innings of work between the two affiliates. In 2011, Broadway returned to Mississippi, where he recorded a 1.80 ERA with six strikeouts in four games, missing most of the season with injury. He elected free agency following the season on November 2, 2011.

=== San Diego Padres ===
On May 28, 2012, Broadway signed a minor league contract with the San Diego Padres organization. He spent the season with the Double-A San Antonio Missions, pitching to a 6.35 ERA with 45 strikeouts in 33 appearances. On March 31, 2013, Broadway was released by the Padres.

=== Washington Nationals ===
On April 1, 2013, Broadway signed a minor league contract with the Washington Nationals organization. He split the season between the Double-A Harrisburg Senators and the Triple-A Syracuse Chiefs, posting a 2.45 ERA with 40 strikeouts in 40 1/3 innings of work. Broadway elected free agency following the season on November 4.

=== San Francisco Giants ===
On January 24, 2014, Broadway signed a minor league contract with the San Francisco Giants. He was assigned to the Triple-A Fresno Grizzlies to begin the year, but missed most of the season due to injury. In three games for Fresno and five rehab games with the rookie-level Arizona League Giants, Broadway registered a 4.50 ERA with 11 strikeouts. On January 8, 2015, Broadway re-signed with the Giants on a new minor league contract. He was assigned to the Triple-A Sacramento River Cats to begin the season, with whom he recorded an excellent 0.93 ERA with 13 saves and 64 strikeouts in 40 appearances.

On June 12, 2015, Broadway was selected to the 40-man roster and promoted to the major leagues for the first time. He made his major league debut the following day against the Arizona Diamondbacks, pitching one scoreless inning with one strikeout. Broadway was optioned to Triple-A Sacramento on June 23 but was recalled on June 26. He was optioned back to Sacramento on July 3. In 21 major league appearances during his rookie campaign, Broadway pitched to a 5.19 ERA with 13 strikeouts across 17 1/3 innings.

Broadway started the 2016 season with the Triple-A Sacramento River Cats. He was called up on April 19, 2016, to replace the injured George Kontos. On April 29, Broadway yielded six runs as part of a 12-run third inning against the New York Mets, and was optioned back to Sacramento the following day. He was designated for assignment on July 4, after struggling to an 11.81 ERA across 4 appearances. On July 11, Broadway was released by the Giants organization.

=== Yokohama DeNA BayStars ===
On July 14, 2016, Broadway signed a one-year, $570,000 contract with the Yokohama DeNA BayStars of Nippon Professional Baseball. Broadway made five appearances for Yokohama down the stretch, pitching to a 4.50 ERA with three strikeouts over six innings of work. He became a free agent after the year.

=== Washington Nationals (second stint) ===
On December 13, 2016, Broadway signed a minor league contract with the Washington Nationals organization that included an invitation to spring training. He was assigned to the Triple-A Syracuse Chiefs to begin the year, but was released on May 31, 2017, after struggling to a 10.38 ERA with 19 strikeouts over 13 games with the team.

=== Tampa Bay Rays ===
On June 22, 2017, Broadway signed a minor league deal with the Tampa Bay Rays organization. He split the remainder of the season between the Double-A Montgomery Biscuits and the Triple-A Durham Bulls, striking out 28 in 32 innings of work across 23 combined games. On November 6, Broadway elected free agency.

=== Kansas City Royals ===
On December 14, 2017, Broadway signed a minor league contract with the Kansas City Royals. He began the season with the Triple-A Omaha Storm Chasers, but struggled to a 7.91 ERA with 23 strikeouts across 20 appearances, and was released on June 18, 2018.

=== Tampa Bay Rays (second stint) ===
On June 30, 2018, Broadway signed a minor league deal with the Tampa Bay Rays. He finished the season with the Double-A Montgomery Biscuits, registering a 3.60 ERA with 38 strikeouts and one save in 22 games. Broadway elected free agency following the season on November 2.

=== Somerset Patriots ===
On March 21, 2019, Broadway signed with the Somerset Patriots of the Atlantic League of Professional Baseball. Broadway recorded a 1–4 record and 2.84 ERA with 45 strikeouts in 31 games before he announced his retirement on July 19.

=== West Virginia Power ===
On May 28, 2021, Broadway came out of retirement to sign with the West Virginia Power of the Atlantic League of Professional Baseball. In 10 games for the Power, Broadway recorded a stellar 1.42 ERA before being released on June 22.

=== Leones de Yucatán ===
On June 25, 2021, Broadway signed with the Leones de Yucatán of the Mexican League. In 11 games with Yucatán, Broadway pitched to a 3.86 ERA with eight strikeouts across 11 2/3 innings pitched.

=== West Virginia Power (second stint) ===
On July 25, 2021, Broadway re-signed with the West Virginia Power of the Atlantic League of Professional Baseball. He became a free agent following the season.
