= Cody Hall (baseball) =

American baseball player (born 1988)

- Pitcher
- Born: January 6, 1988 (age 38); Savannah, Georgia, U.S.
- Batted: Right Threw: Right

MLB debut
- September 3, 2015, for the San Francisco Giants

Last MLB appearance
- June 4, 2016, for the Miami Marlins

MLB statistics
- Win–loss record: 0-0
- Earned run average: 7.94
- Strikeouts: 10
- Stats at Baseball Reference

Teams
- San Francisco Giants (2015); Miami Marlins (2016)

Cody Kevin Hall (born January 6, 1988) is an American former professional baseball pitcher. He made his Major League Baseball (MLB) debut with the San Francisco Giants in 2015 and has also played for the Miami Marlins.

== Career ==
=== San Francisco Giants ===
Hall played college baseball at Southern University and A&M College. He was drafted by the San Francisco Giants in the 19th round of the 2011 Major League Baseball draft. The Giants added Hall to their 40-man roster on November 20, 2014, and he made his major league debut on September 2, 2015.

=== Arizona Diamondbacks ===
Hall was claimed off waivers by the Arizona Diamondbacks on January 13, 2016.

=== Miami Marlins ===
He was then claimed off waivers by the Miami Marlins on May 18, 2016. He was released on August 14, 2016.

=== Lancaster Barnstormers ===
On March 28, 2017, Hall signed with the Lancaster Barnstormers of the Atlantic League of Professional Baseball.

=== San Francisco Giants (second stint) ===
On June 26, 2017, Hall signed a minor league deal with the San Francisco Giants organization. In 25 games for the Double–A Richmond Flying Squirrels, he posted a 2.79 ERA with 40 strikeouts in 29.0 innings of work. Hall elected free agency following the season on November 6.

=== Tampa Bay Rays ===
On December 8, 2017, Hall signed a minor league contract with the Tampa Bay Rays. He was released on June 24, 2018.
