= Carlos Frías =

Dominican baseball player (born 1989)

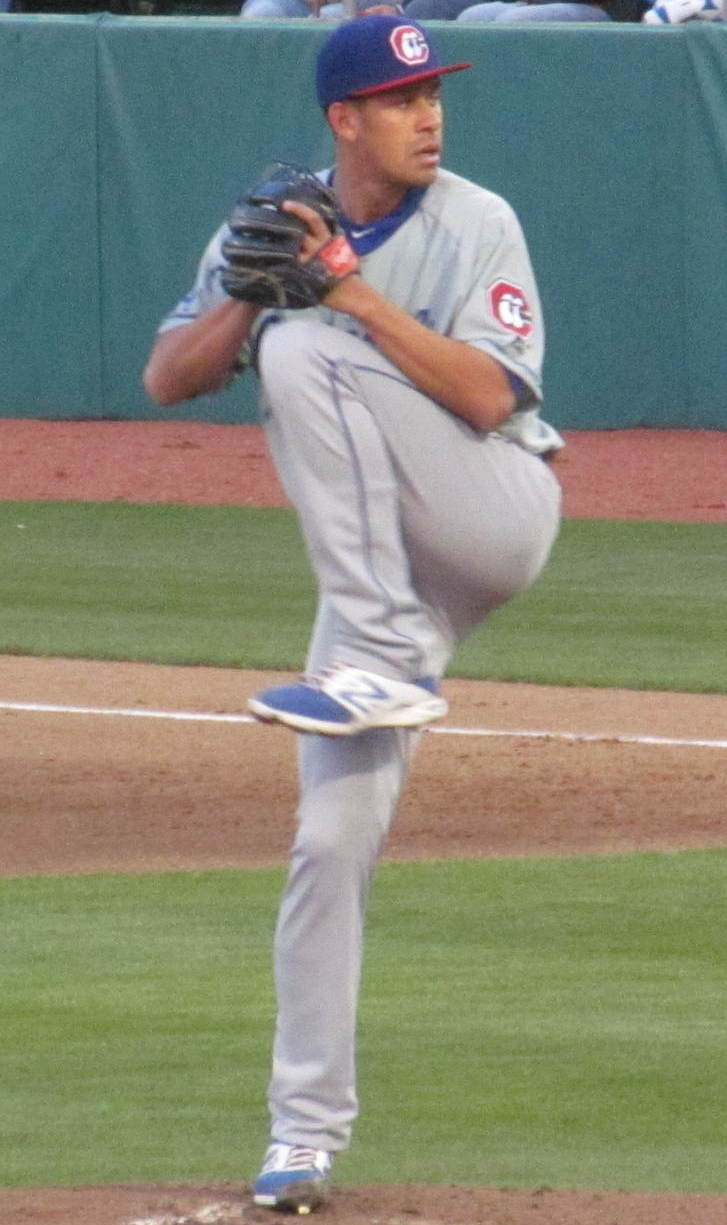
- Frías with the Chattanooga Lookouts in 2014
- Pitcher
- Born: November 13, 1989 (age 36); Nagua, Dominican Republic
- Batted: Right Threw: Right

MLB debut
- August 4, 2014, for the Los Angeles Dodgers

Last MLB appearance
- July 7, 2016, for the Los Angeles Dodgers

MLB statistics
- Win–loss record: 6–6
- Earned run average: 4.50
- Strikeouts: 75
- Stats at Baseball Reference

Teams
- Los Angeles Dodgers (2014–2016)

Carlos David Frías (born November 13, 1989) is a Dominican former professional baseball pitcher. He played in Major League Baseball (MLB) for the Los Angeles Dodgers.

== Career ==
=== Los Angeles Dodgers ===
Frías joined the Los Angeles Dodgers organization as an international free agent in 2007 and began his professional career with the Dominican Summer League Dodgers. He was 6–2 with a 1.81 ERA for the DSL team that year in 13 games and earned a promotion to the U.S. based rookie-level affiliate, the Gulf Coast League Dodgers the following year.

Frías moved up through the Dodgers farm system, appearing for the Arizona League Dodgers in 2009, the Ogden Raptors in 2010 and the Rancho Cucamonga Quakes in 2011. He returned to Ogden in 2012 and then split 2013 among the Quakes, the Great Lakes Loons and the Chattanooga Lookouts. He was selected to the Midwest League All-Star team in 2013 after he had a 4–2 record and 1.86 ERA in the first half of the season and received an invitation to the Dodgers' spring training camp in 2014, but began the season with the Lookouts and was promoted to the Triple-A Albuquerque Isotopes in May. While with the Isotopes, he was suspended twice during the month of July. He was hit with a 10-game suspension for having a foreign substance on his arm during a game on July 2 and then on July 29, he was suspended seven games for his role in an on-field fight with the Reno Aces. In 16 games with the Isotopes, he was 8–4 with a 5.01 ERA.

Frías was called up to the majors for the first time on August 4, 2014 and made his debut that night, against the Los Angeles Angels of Anaheim, pitching two scoreless innings. Frías made his first major league start on September 3, against the Washington Nationals, pitching six scoreless innings in a game the Dodgers eventually lost in extra innings.

In his second major league start on September 17, 2014, against the Colorado Rockies, Frías became the first pitcher in the modern era to yield 10 hits while logging fewer than three outs. He was pulled in the first inning and charged with 8 runs. The rest of his 15 appearances for the Dodgers were out of the bullpen. Overall, he was 1–1 with a 6.12 ERA in 32.1 innings pitched. He was assigned to the new AAA team, the Oklahoma City Dodgers to start 2015. He was promoted to the Majors on April 26 and won his first three decisions. However, on May 24 he allowed 10 runs in only four innings of work, tying the Los Angeles Dodgers record for most runs allowed in a game. He made 13 starts (and four relief appearances) for the Dodgers in 2015 and was 5–5 with a 4.06 ERA. He only appeared in one game for the Dodgers in 2016, pitching four scoreless innings of relief on July 7 against the San Diego Padres. He also made eight appearances (four starts) for the Oklahoma City Dodgers with a 3–3 record and 4.46 ERA while spending most of the season on the minor league disabled list. On January 25, 2017, Frías was designated for assignment by the Dodgers.

=== Cleveland Indians ===
On January 30, 2017, Frías was traded to the Cleveland Indians in exchange for cash considerations. Frías was designated for assignment on May 16, 2017, to make room on the Indians' roster for Bradley Zimmer; after clearing waivers, he was outrighted to the Triple-A Columbus Clippers. He elected free agency following the season on November 6.

On January 23, 2018, Frias re–signed with Cleveland on a minor league contract. He was released by the organization on March 29.

=== Leones de Yucatán ===
On April 23, 2018, Frías signed with the Leones de Yucatán of the Mexican League. In nine appearances for Yucatán, he registered an 0–2 record and 4.82 ERA with four strikeouts and one save across 9 1/3 innings of relief. Frías was released by the Leones on July 23.

=== Tigres de Quintana Roo ===
On February 4, 2019, Frías signed with the Tigres de Quintana Roo of the Mexican League. In 12 appearances (six starts) for Quintana Roo, he struggled to a 1–4 record and 8.51 ERA with 29 strikeouts across 30 2/3 innings pitched. Frías was released by the Tigres on May 21.
