= James Shields (baseball) =

American baseball player (born 1981)

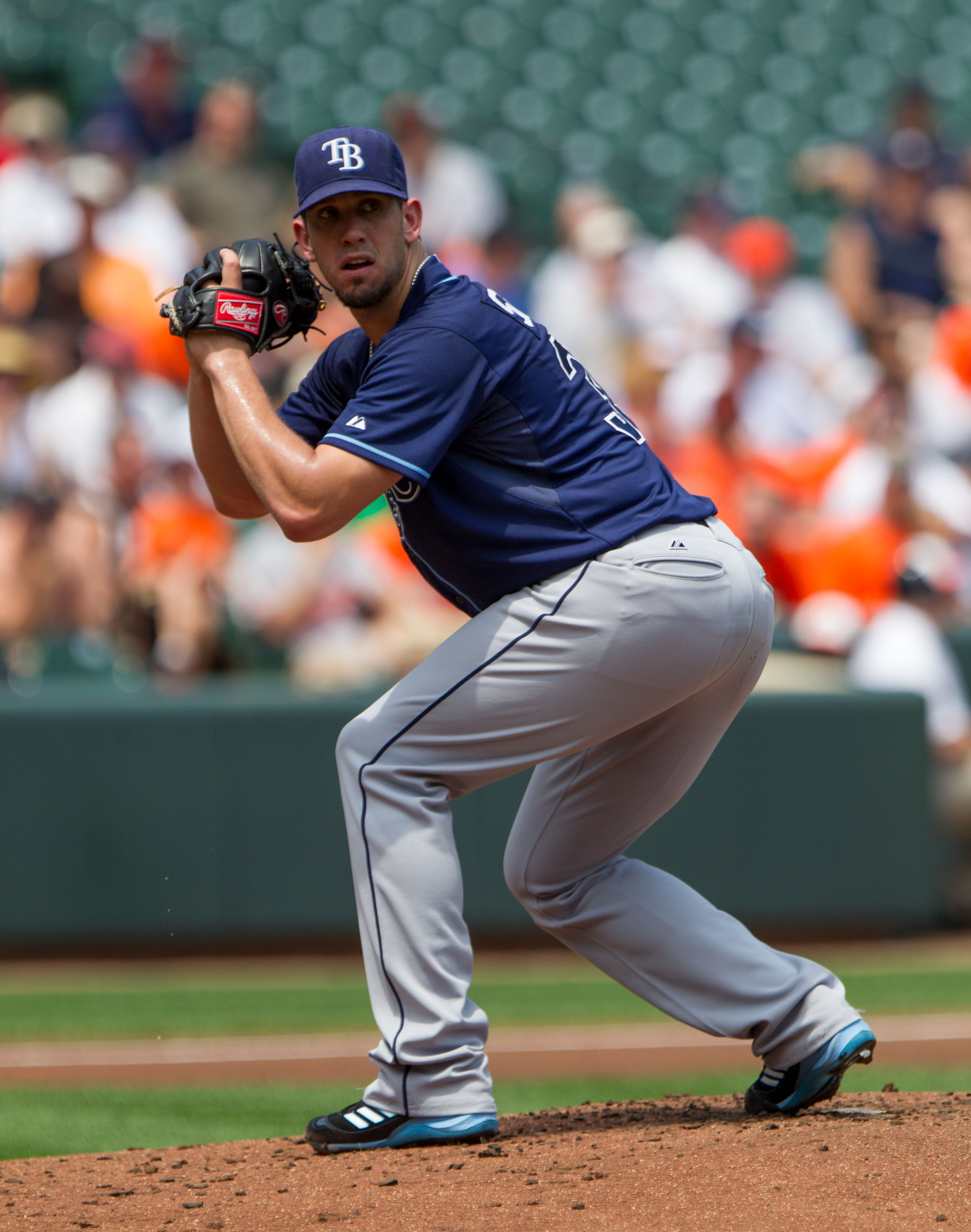
- Shields with the Tampa Bay Rays in 2012
- Pitcher
- Born: December 20, 1981 (age 44); Newhall, California, U.S.
- Batted: Right Threw: Right

MLB debut
- May 31, 2006, for the Tampa Bay Devil Rays

Last MLB appearance
- September 25, 2018, for the Chicago White Sox

MLB statistics
- Win–loss record: 145–139
- Earned run average: 4.01
- Strikeouts: 2,234
- Stats at Baseball Reference

Teams
- Tampa Bay Devil Rays / Rays (2006–2012); Kansas City Royals (2013–2014); San Diego Padres (2015–2016); Chicago White Sox (2016–2018)

Career highlights and awards
- All-Star (2011)

James Anthony Shields (born December 20, 1981), nicknamed "Big Game James", is an American former professional baseball starting pitcher. He played in Major League Baseball (MLB) for the Tampa Bay Rays from 2006 through 2012, the Kansas City Royals in 2013 and 2014, the San Diego Padres in 2015 and 2016, and the Chicago White Sox from 2016 to 2018. He was an All Star in 2011.

== Amateur career ==
Shields grew up in the Newhall neighborhood of Santa Clarita, California. He has two older brothers. While attending William S. Hart High School, he was named the Los Angeles Times's Valley Player of the Year in 1999, his junior season after leading Hart to the Division II championship. He had an 11–0 win–loss record with a 2.35 earned run average (ERA) with 123 strikeouts in 71 1/3 innings pitched. He also batted .478 with a then-school record 11 home runs and 45 runs batted in, being named the Southern Section's Division II Player of the Year. He declined a full scholarship to play baseball at Louisiana State University in favor of signing with the Tampa Bay Devil Rays. Baseball America ranked him the 16th best high school prospect in 2000.

== Professional career ==
=== Tampa Bay Devil Rays/Rays ===
The Tampa Bay Devil Rays selected Shields in the 16th round of the 2000 MLB draft. After pitching well during his first season at the Class-A level in 2001, Shields underwent serious shoulder surgery that caused him to miss the entire 2002 season. His fastball lost some velocity as a result, forcing him to change his pitching approach and develop a changeup as he worked his way up through the Devil Rays system.

Shields made his Major League debut against the Baltimore Orioles on May 31, 2006. He surrendered five runs over five innings as he earned a no-decision. On June 5, Shields picked up his first big league win against the Los Angeles Angels of Anaheim, striking out six over six innings of work. On June 21, 2006, Shields became the first Devil Rays pitcher to start his career with four straight wins.

Shields's rookie season with Tampa Bay was relatively unimpressive. He finished with a 6–8 record and an ERA of 4.84. However, his 104 strikeouts in just under 125 innings was promising.

In 2007, Shields began to emerge as a legitimate top of the rotation starter to complement Scott Kazmir. On May 9, he pitched nine shutout, three-hit innings, only to receive a no-decision due to lack of run support in an eventual 10-inning loss. Later, on May 30, he pitched a complete game in a 5–3 win vs the Detroit Tigers in which, after a three-run first inning, he retired 13 straight batters. Shields finished the season 12–8 with a 3.85 ERA in 31 starts. His 184 strikeouts in 215 innings placed him among the league leaders. He was also second-best in the AL in strikeout-to-walk ratio (5.11 K/BB) and third-best in walks per nine innings (1.51 BB/9) and WHIP (1.107).

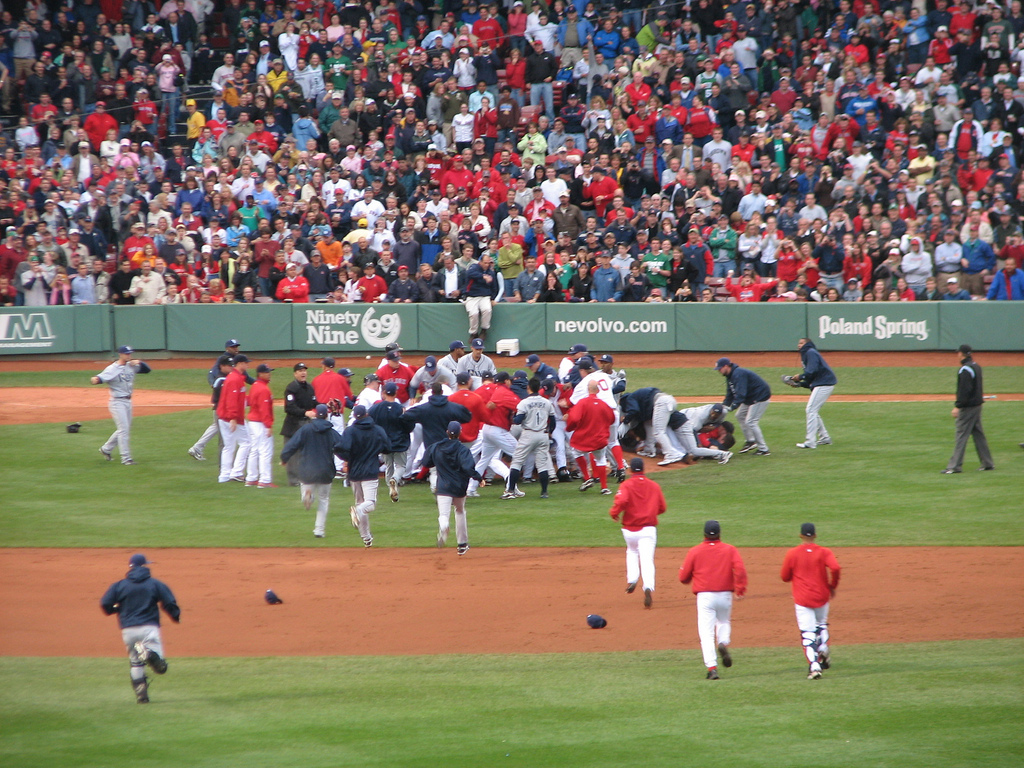
Bench-clearing brawl on June 5, 2008

Based on less than two full years of major league work with Tampa Bay, the Rays signed him to a four-year, $11.25 million contract after the 2008 season. This deal contained three team options and multiple performance bonuses that could expand the deal to seven years and upwards of $44 million.

After an injury to Tampa Bay's ace, Scott Kazmir, Shields made the 2008 Opening Day start for the Rays against Baltimore, earning the win by giving up two runs in seven innings in the 6–2 victory.

On April 27, 2008, Shields threw a two-hit complete game shutout against the Boston Red Sox, throwing only 98 pitches, for the first Maddux of his career. On May 9 (exactly one year after his gem against Detroit), Shields had a one-hit shutout against the Angels, posting a Game Score of 93.

On June 5, 2008, during a game against the Boston Red Sox, Shields hit Coco Crisp with a pitch and Crisp charged the mound. Shields threw a punch and missed, while Crisp countered with a punch at Shields that also missed. Moments later, both teams' benches emptied onto the field. Shields stated afterward that he was protecting his teammates, believing that he did the right thing following an incident the night before involving Crisp. Following the incident, Shields and Crisp were suspended for 6 and 7 games, respectively.

Shields threw a changeup 26.3% of the time in 2008, tops in the AL. Shields became the first winning pitcher in a postseason game in the history of both the Rays and Tropicana Field when the Rays beat the Chicago White Sox in Game 1 of the 2008 ALDS. He was the first Tampa Bay Rays pitcher to win a World Series game, having done so in Game 2 of the 2008 World Series. The Rays ended up losing the series to the Philadelphia Phillies within five games. Shields led the Rays in innings pitched in 2008 with 215, and also tied Edwin Jackson to lead the Rays with 14 wins, which also tied the record for most wins by a Rays pitcher.

In 2009, Shields was the Opening Day starter for the Rays. The Rays fell, 5–3, to the Red Sox, in an ALCS rematch. On August 3, Shields had a no-hitter going into the eighth inning against the Kansas City Royals. It was broken up by Royals catcher John Buck. Shields finished the 2009 season at 11–12 with 4.14 ERA in 33 starts.

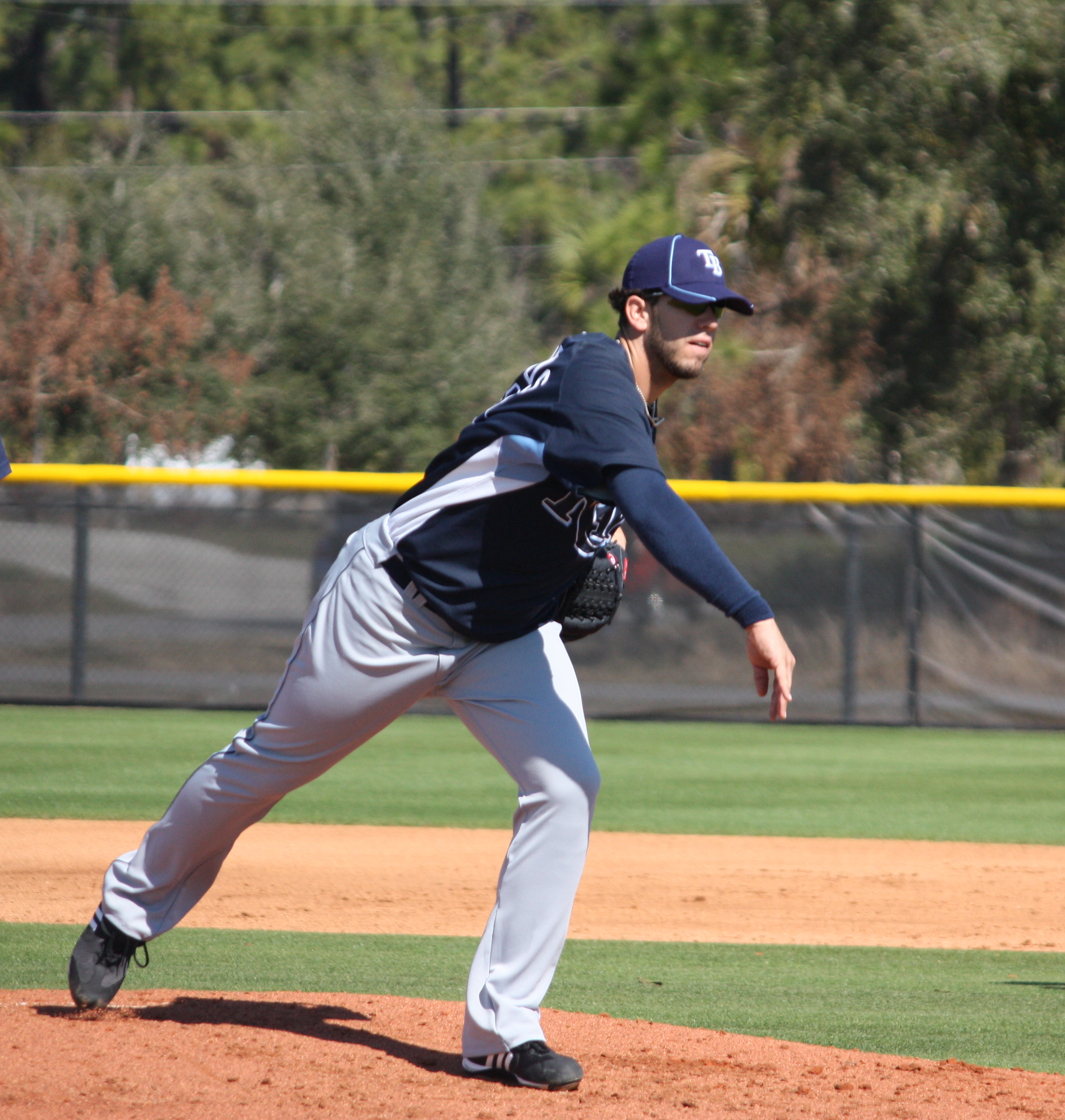
Shields during 2010 spring training.

On August 7, 2010, Shields gave up six home runs to the Toronto Blue Jays (two by Aaron Hill, and one by Edwin Encarnación, Adam Lind, José Bautista, and J. P. Arencibia), tying a modern-day record of home runs allowed in one game. Arencibia's home run was the first of his career, hit in his first at-bat off Shields's first pitch. Shields finished the 2010 season at 13–15 with a 5.18 ERA, which was the fourth-highest among qualifying starting pitchers. He led the majors with 246 hits and 117 earned runs allowed.

Shields was selected as an All-Star for the first time in his Major League career in 2011. He was named the 2011 Tampa Bay Rays team MVP by the Tampa Bay chapter of the Baseball Writers' Association of America, compiling a 16–12 win–loss record, 2.82 ERA, a career-high 225 strikeouts, and a team-record 11 complete games. The 11 complete games earned him the nickname "Complete Game James" among fans and local media. Shields also finished 3rd in the American League Cy Young voting.

Despite continued success on the mound in 2012, Shields did not receive much run support from the Rays and finished the season with a record of 15-10 and a 3.52 ERA. During his final start of the season on October 2, he pitched a complete game against the Baltimore Orioles, setting a franchise record with 15 strikeouts. Despite only giving up two hits, Shields took the loss as the Orioles won the game 1–0, with the deciding run coming off a home run by Chris Davis.

=== Kansas City Royals ===
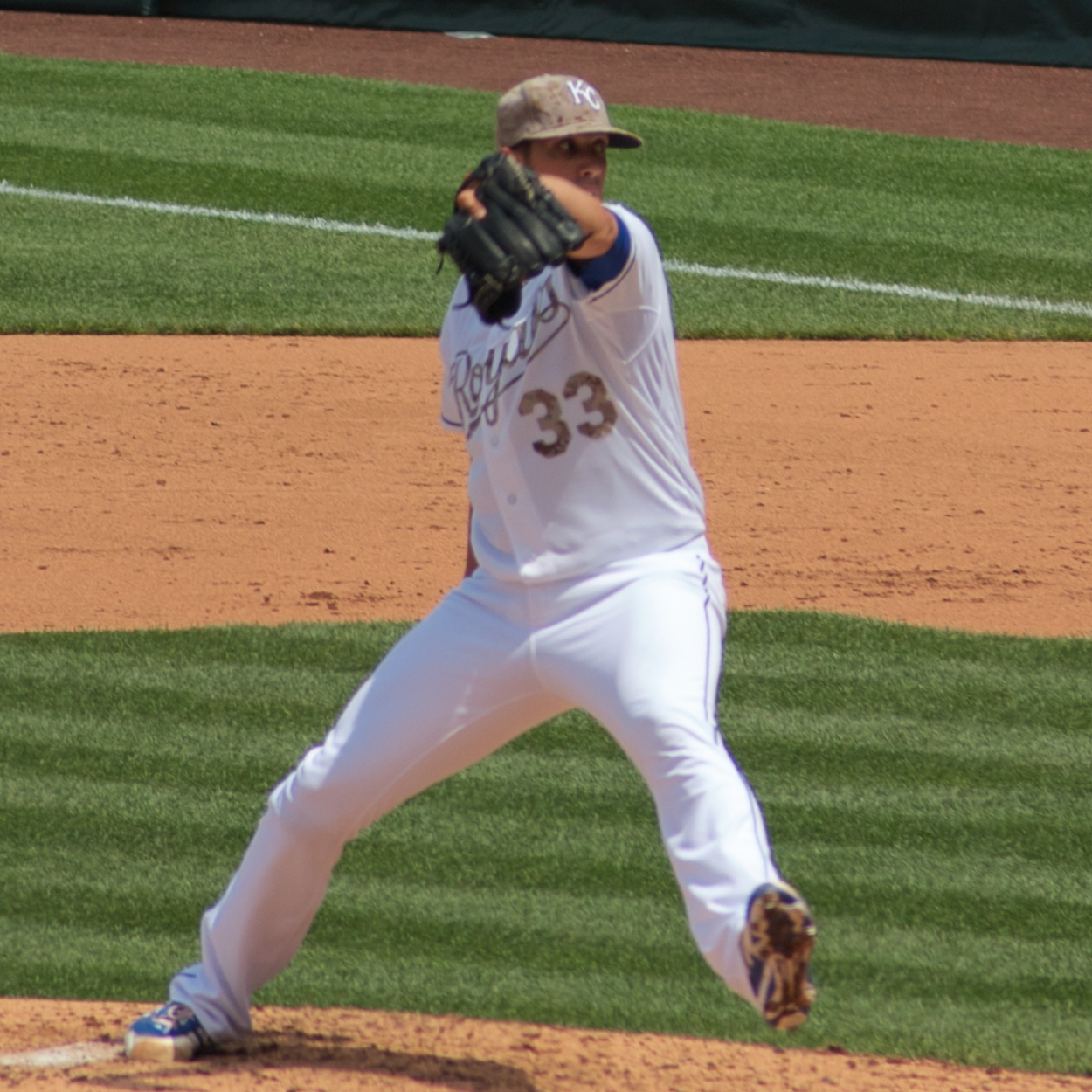
Shields pitching for the Kansas City Royals

On December 9, 2012, Shields was traded to the Kansas City Royals (along with Wade Davis) in exchange for Wil Myers, Jake Odorizzi, Mike Montgomery and Patrick Leonard. In his first year as a Royal, Shields posted a 13-9 record with a 3.15 ERA, also setting a personal best in games started. On October 31, 2013, the Kansas City Royals exercised a $13.5 million option on Shields for the 2014 season.

On May 13, 2014, in a 5-1 victory over the Colorado Rockies, Shields struck out Troy Tulowitzki in the sixth inning to record his 1,500th career strikeout. Shields started the first postseason game for the Royals in 29 years on September 30. He allowed 4 earned runs over 5 innings as the Royals defeated the Oakland Athletics in 12 innings, 9-8. On October 5, 2014, Shields started Game 3 of the American League Divisional Series against the Los Angeles Angels. He pitched 6 innings, allowed 2 earned runs on 6 hits and struck out 6 and earned the win as the Royals swept the Angels. After then sweeping the Orioles, he led Kansas City to their first World Series in 29 years. In the 2014 World Series, Shields started in games 1 and 5, but lost both, and the Royals lost the series 4 games to 3. Following the 2014 season, Shields became a free agent.

=== San Diego Padres ===
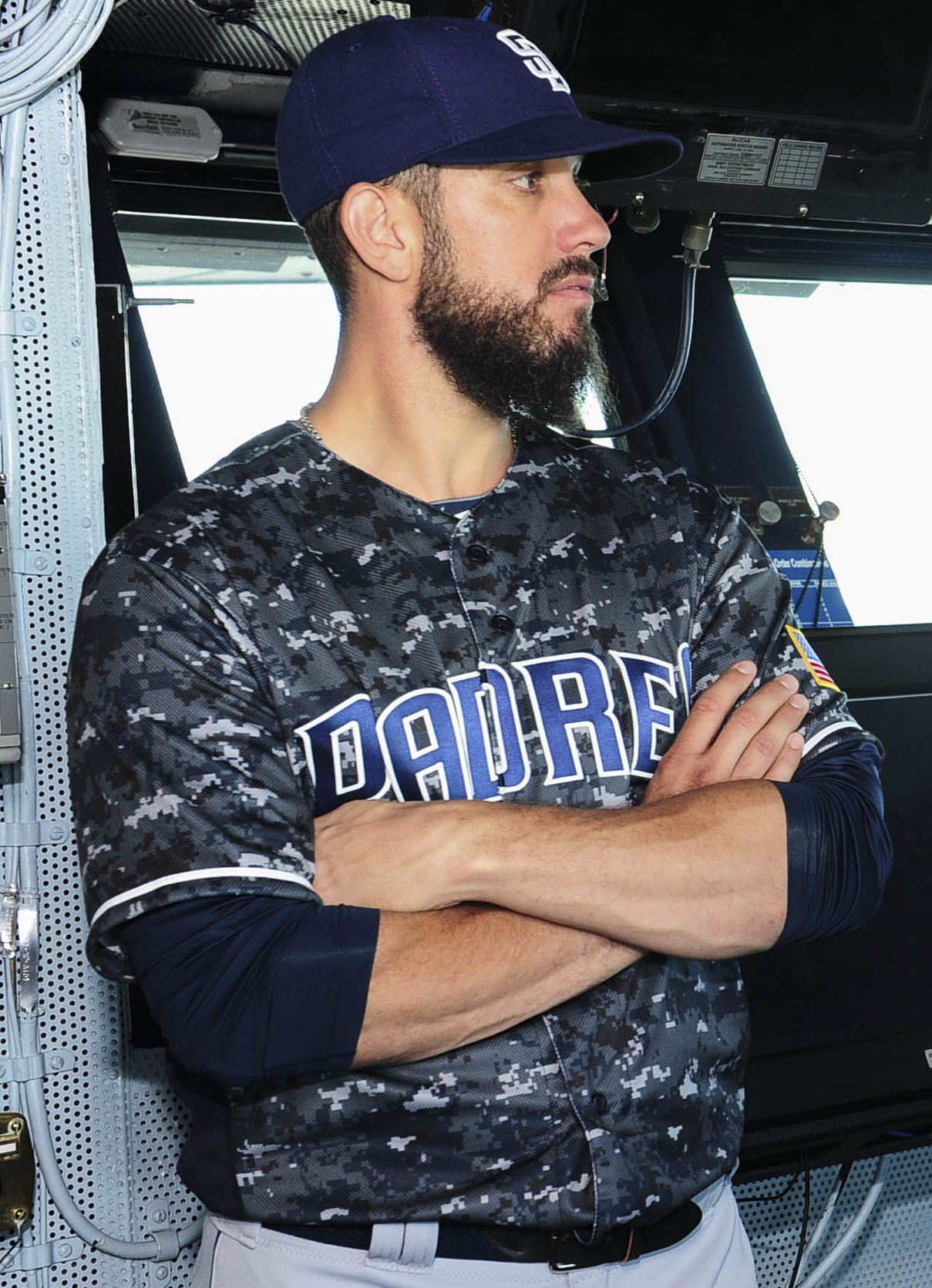
Shields aboard the USS Theodore Roosevelt (CVN-71) with the Padres in 2015

On February 11, 2015, the San Diego Padres signed Shields to a four-year contract, worth $75 million, with a fifth-year club option.

In 33 starts for the Padres in 2015, Shields went 13-7 with a 3.91 ERA and 216 strikeouts. However, Shields also gave up a league-leading 33 home runs. He also gave up Bartolo Colón's first major league home run on May 7, 2016.

=== Chicago White Sox ===
On June 4, 2016, Shields was traded to the Chicago White Sox in exchange for Erik Johnson and Fernando Tatís Jr. Shields made his first start with the White Sox against the Washington Nationals on June 8. He allowed 7 earned runs in 2 1/3 innings pitched before being taken out of the game. The White Sox lost the game by 11–4. Shields went 4-12 with a 6.77 ERA in the 114.1 innings pitched for the White Sox. For the 2016 season, between the two teams he led the majors in giving up the most home runs (40), in giving up the most home runs per nine innings (1.98), and had the highest WHIP among major league pitchers (1.48). He had the lowest zone percentage of all major league pitchers, with only 37.7% of his pitches being in the strike zone.

On April 6, 2017, Shields won his first game of the season, pitching 5 1/3 innings, allowing only two hits and one run (solo homer in the second inning), throwing five strikeouts and five walks. On June 24, he gave up the first major league home runs to 3 Oakland Athletics rookies; Matt Olson (who later hit his 2nd home run off of reliever Jake Petricka), Jaycob Brugman, and Franklin Barreto; this was the first time 3 rookies have hit their first major league home run in the same game.

The White Sox declined the 2019 option on Shields's contract on October 29, 2018, making him a free agent.

== Scouting report ==
Shields had good command of his fastball and changeup. His four-seam and two-seam fastballs typically reached 91 to 94 miles per hour, and he also threw a changeup, a cut fastball, and a spiked curve. Shields used an awkward windup where he shifted his weight back toward second base by moving his left leg in the air and moving it behind him. He then paused for about one second before delivering the pitch.

== Personal life ==
Shields's teammates nicknamed him "Big Game James" in honor of James Worthy.

Shields married Ryane Barber in November 2007 in Kauai, Hawaii. They made their home in Rancho Santa Fe, California with their two daughters. In April 2026, they placed their five bedroom, 13,500 square foot home on the market for US$23 million.

The couple is involved with The Heart Gallery and Eckerd Youth Alternatives, two initiatives benefiting children in foster care, and in 2010 donated a suite at Tropicana Field called "Big Game James Clubhouse" for the use of foster children attending games through the two initiatives. They also hosted an annual "Heart Gallery Night at the Rays" during Shields's tenure with the club.

Shields is the first cousin of former MLB outfielder Aaron Rowand.
