= George Kontos =

American baseball player (born 1985)

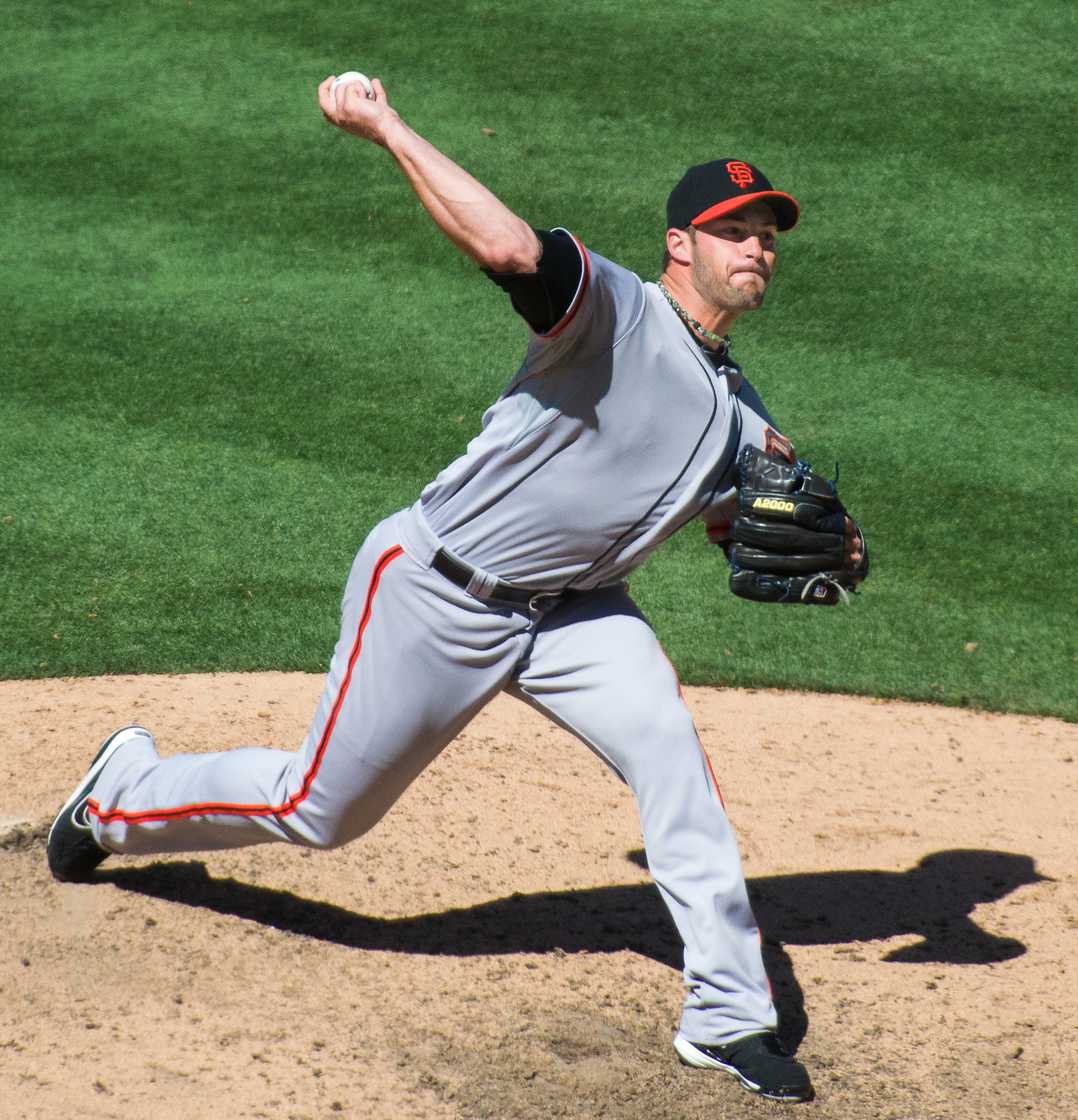
- Kontos with the San Francisco Giants in 2012
- Pitcher
- Born: June 12, 1985 (age 41); Lincolnwood, Illinois, U.S.
- Batted: Right Threw: Right

MLB debut
- September 10, 2011, for the New York Yankees

Last MLB appearance
- August 13, 2018, for the New York Yankees

MLB statistics
- Win–loss record: 18–18
- Earned run average: 3.10
- Strikeouts: 288
- Stats at Baseball Reference

Teams
- New York Yankees (2011); San Francisco Giants (2012–2017); Pittsburgh Pirates (2017–2018); Cleveland Indians (2018); New York Yankees (2018)

Career highlights and awards
- World Series champion (2012)

George Nicholas Kontos (born June 12, 1985) is an American former professional baseball pitcher. He played in Major League Baseball (MLB) for the New York Yankees, San Francisco Giants, Pittsburgh Pirates, and Cleveland Indians. Prior to playing professionally, he played college baseball at Northwestern University. He bats and throws right-handed.

== Early life ==
George Nicholas Kontos was born on June 12, 1985, in Lincolnwood, Illinois. Kontos attended Niles West High School in Skokie, Illinois, where he was named the high school baseball player of the year in Illinois in 2003. He also lettered in golf and basketball.

== College career ==
Kontos attended Northwestern University as an economics major, where he played for the Northwestern Wildcats baseball team in the Big Ten Conference. In 2005, he played collegiate summer baseball with the Harwich Mariners of the Cape Cod Baseball League.

== Professional career ==
=== Draft and minor leagues ===
The New York Yankees selected Kontos in the fifth round of the 2006 Major League Baseball draft after his junior year. Kontos signed with the Yankees after his college career and played for the Staten Island Yankees of the Low-A New York–Penn League in 2006, winning the league championship. With a 7–3 win–loss record, 2.64 ERA, and 82 strikeouts in 78 innings pitched, Baseball America named Kontos a Short-Season All-Star. He pitched for the Tampa Yankees of the High-A Florida State League in 2007 and the Trenton Thunder of the Double-A Eastern League in 2008. After starting the 2009 season with Trenton, he was promoted to the Scranton/Wilkes-Barre Yankees of the Triple-A International League.

After experiencing tightness in his pitching arm in June 2009, Kontos went on the disabled list in what he thought was a precautionary measure. Magnetic resonance imaging diagnosed a torn ulnar collateral ligament in his elbow, which required Tommy John surgery, forcing him to miss the rest of the season. Returning to action in 2010 after a ten-month recovery, Kontos shifted into a relief pitcher. That season, he pitched for Tampa, Trenton, and Scranton/Wilkes-Barre. After the 2010 season, the Yankees opted not to protect Kontos on their 40-man roster. Consequently, he was selected by the San Diego Padres from the Yankees in the Rule 5 draft that offseason. After making three appearances for the Padres during spring training in 2011, he was returned to the Yankees prior to the regular season.

Kontos began his 2011 minor league season with Scranton/Wilkes-Barre, where he pitched to a 4–4 win–loss record and a 2.64 ERA in 40 appearances.

=== New York Yankees (2011) ===
Kontos made his major league debut on September 10, 2011 against the Los Angeles Angels of Anaheim. Appearing in seven games for the Yankees, Kontos pitched to a 3.00 ERA in six innings, while striking out six batters. Kontos was also part of the Yankees postseason roster until the Yankees lost to the Detroit Tigers in the 2011 ALDS.

=== San Francisco Giants (2012–2017) ===
Due in part to a back injury suffered by Yankees catcher Austin Romine, the Yankees traded Kontos to the San Francisco Giants in exchange for catcher Chris Stewart before the start of the 2012 season. He began the season with the Fresno Grizzlies of the Triple-A Pacific Coast League. After starting the season with a 2–0 win–loss record and a 1.71 ERA in 23 appearances, the Giants promoted him to the major leagues on June 10. Through August 14, he pitched to a 2.33 ERA and a 1.15 walks plus hits per innings pitched (WHIP) ratio in 26 games, becoming a reliable member of the Giants bullpen. Kontos got his first major league win in relief of Barry Zito, successfully recording 7 outs without allowing a baserunner. The Giants went on to win the game 6–4 against the Astros. Kontos entered the postseason for a second straight season and won the 2012 World Series with the Giants in a four-game sweep of the Detroit Tigers.

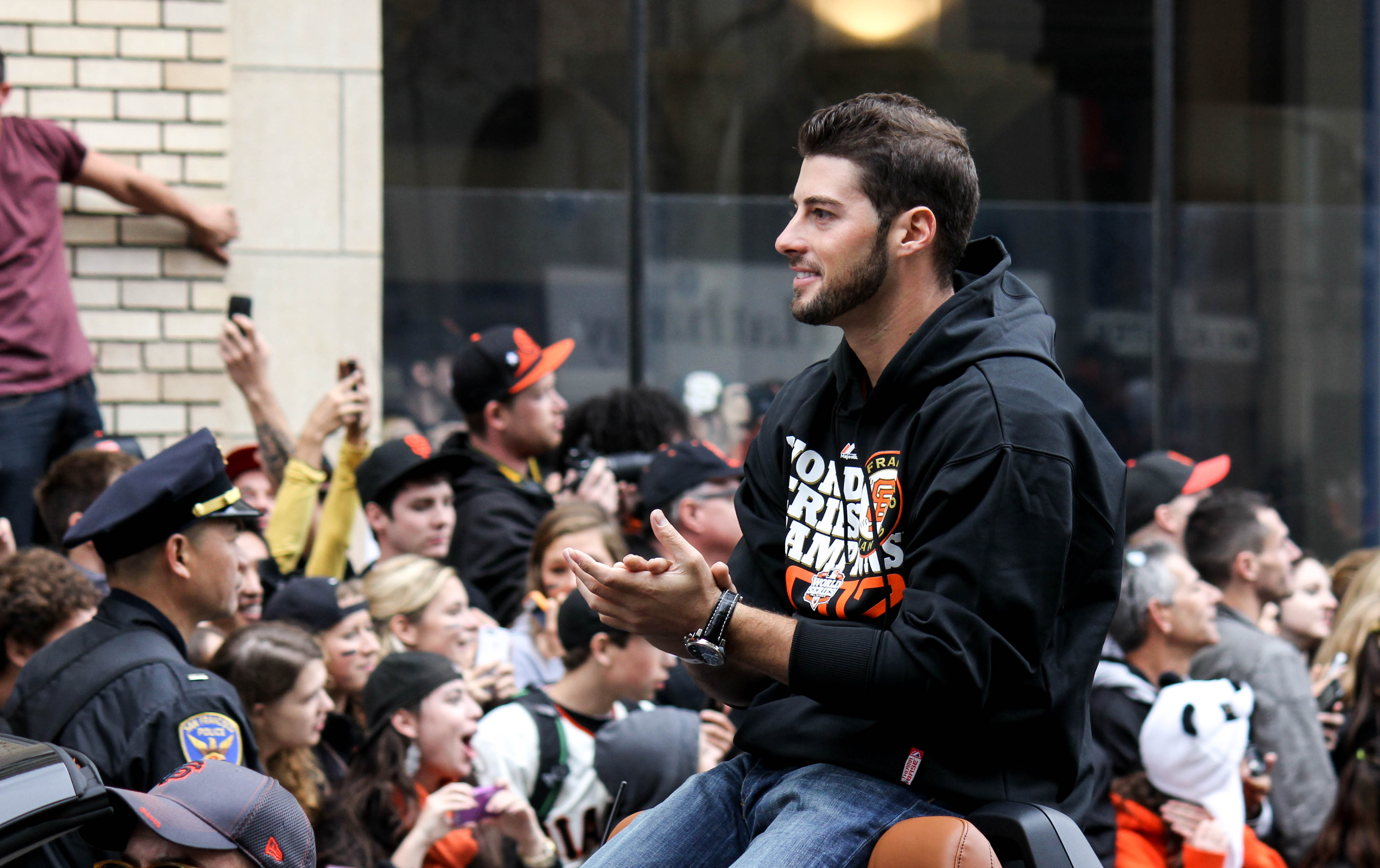
Kontos at the 2012 World Series victory parade

In 2013, Kontos was named to the opening-day 25-man roster. On June 11, 2013, Kontos was ejected for the first time in his Major League career after hitting Pittsburgh Pirates center fielder Andrew McCutchen with a pitch. Kontos was suspended three games by the commissioner's office and optioned to Triple-A Fresno on June 12. Kontos was recalled to the majors on June 24. On July 22, Kontos threw a career-high 63 pitches in an 11–0 loss to the Cincinnati Reds that helped save the Giants' bullpen before a doubleheader the following day. Kontos was optioned back to Triple-A on July 23 and wasn't recalled until rosters expanded in September. On September 20, 2013, Kontos achieved notoriety as he surrendered Alex Rodriguez's 24th career grand slam that broke the record formerly held by Lou Gehrig. For the 2013 season, Kontos made 52 relief appearances, pitching 55 1/3 innings with a 2–2 record and 4.39 ERA.

In 2014, Kontos started the season in Triple-A Fresno. During the season, he was called up to the Majors and sent back to Fresno four times. In 24 games with the Giants, he pitched 32 1/3 innings with 27 strikeouts, a 4–0 record, and 2.88 ERA. He was left off the postseason roster.

Kontos was named to the Giants' opening-day roster for 2015. Through July 11, Kontos stranded all 25 base runners he inherited on the season. Kontos appeared in a career-high 73 games, recording a career-best 0.941 WHIP and holding opponents to a .159 average with runners in scoring position, third-best in the Majors. In 2015, Kontos pitched 73 1/3 innings, with 44 strikeouts, a 4–4 record, and 2.33 ERA.

On February 1, 2016, Kontos agreed to a one-year, $1.15 million contract with the San Francisco Giants, avoiding arbitration. After appearing in eight of the Giants' first 13 games of the 2016 season, Kontos went on the disabled list with a strained flexor. In 57 games, Kontos pitched 53 1/3 innings with 35 strikeouts and a 2.53 ERA.

In 2017, Kontos and the Giants agreed to a one-year, $1.75 million contract, avoiding arbitration.

=== Pittsburgh Pirates (2017–2018) ===
On August 5, 2017, Kontos was claimed on waivers by the Pittsburgh Pirates. For the last month of the season, he posted a 1.84 ERA in 15 games. He was designated for assignment on May 25, 2018, and later released from the organization on May 28.

=== Cleveland Indians (2018) ===
On June 2, 2018, Kontos signed a minor league contract with the Cleveland Indians. The Indians purchased Kontos' contract on June 19. Kontos was designated for assignment on July 6. He cleared waivers and was sent outright to Triple-A Columbus Clippers two days later.

=== Second stint with New York Yankees (2018) ===
On August 4, 2018, Kontos was traded to the New York Yankees in exchange for cash considerations. The Yankees subsequently assigned Kontos to the Triple-A Scranton/Wilkes-Barre RailRiders. He was promoted to the major leagues on August 13. Kontos cleared waivers and was sent outright to Triple-A two days later. He elected free agency after the season on October 5.

=== Long Island Ducks ===
On January 25, 2019, Kontos signed a minor league contract with the Chicago Cubs. He was released on April 14. On May 10, Kontos signed with the Long Island Ducks of the Atlantic League of Professional Baseball. He appeared in seven games, pitching nine innings of relief, with a record of 2–0, a 1.00 ERA, eight strikeouts, and three saves.

=== Washington Nationals ===
On May 25, 2019, Kontos had his contract purchased by the Washington Nationals. In 31 appearances for the Triple-A Fresno Grizzlies, he struggled to a 6.07 ERA with 37 strikeouts across 46 innings pitched. Kontos was released by the Nationals organization on August 28.

Kontos announced his retirement from professional baseball on July 20, 2020.

== Post-playing career ==
Kontos joined NBC Sports Bay Area as a San Francisco Giants pre- and postgame analyst for the 2020 season.

== Personal life ==
Kontos' younger brother, Chris, played on a travelling baseball team, known as the Renegades, that was coached by Steve Bartman and his second cousin Tony.
