= 2015 Atlanta Braves season =

2015 Atlanta Braves
- League: National League
- Division: East
- Ballpark: Turner Field
- City: Atlanta, Georgia
- Record: 67–95 (.414)
- Divisional place: 4th
- Owners: Liberty Media/John Malone
- General managers: John Hart
- Managers: Fredi González
- Television: SportSouth; Fox Sports South (Chip Caray, Joe Simpson, Tom Glavine, Dale Murphy, Jenn Hildreth, Paul Byrd, Kristina Fitzpatrick)
- Radio: WCNN; WNNX; Atlanta Braves Radio Network (Jim Powell, Don Sutton, Ben Ingram, Mark Lemke, Pete Manzano, Fernando Palacios)

The 2015 Atlanta Braves season was the Braves' 19th season of home games at Turner Field, 50th season in Atlanta, and 145th season overall. The Braves failed to improve on their 79–83 record from 2014. As a result, the team finished 2015 with a record of 67–95, in 4th place in NL East, and the 3rd worst record in the major leagues.

== Offseason ==
The Braves offseason began in the final week of the 2014 season. The Braves were officially eliminated from the postseason contention on Sunday, September 21. On Monday, the Braves announced the termination of General Manager Frank Wren and appointed John Hart as the interim general manager. The Braves signed Hart to a three-year deal to become the Braves President of Baseball Operations a month later. Hart continued to fill the role of general manager throughout the offseason with much help from assistant general manager John Coppolella.

=== Offseason additions and subtractions ===
	Subtractions	Additions
Players	RHS Ervin Santana (signed with Twins); RHS Aaron Harang (signed with Phillies); RHS Kris Medlen (signed with Royals); RHS Brandon Beachy (signed with Dodgers); RHR Craig Kimbrel (traded to Padres); RHR Jordan Walden (traded to Cardinals); RHR David Carpenter (traded to Yankees); LHR Chasen Shreve (traded to Yankees); RHP David Hale (traded to Rockies); LHR Jonny Venters (released); RHR Cory Gearrin (signed with Giants); C Evan Gattis (traded to Astros); C Gerald Laird (signed with Diamondbacks); C/OF Ryan Doumit (free agent); 2B Tommy La Stella (traded to Cubs); INF Ramiro Peña (signed with Padres); INF/OF Emilio Bonifacio (signed with White Sox); LF Justin Upton (traded to Padres); RF Jason Heyward (traded to Cardinals); CF Melvin Upton, Jr. (traded to Padres)	RHS Shelby Miller (acquired in trade from Cardinals); RHS Trevor Cahill (acquired in trade from Diamondbacks); LHS Manny Banuelos (acquired in trade from Yankees); RHP Michael Foltynewicz (acquired in trade from Astros); RHR Jason Grilli (signed as a free agent); RHR Jim Johnson (signed as a free agent); LHR Josh Outman (signed as a free agent); RHP Arodys Vizcaíno (acquired in trade from Cubs); C A. J. Pierzynski (signed as a free agent); INF Alberto Callaspo (signed as free agent); INF Jace Peterson (acquired in trade from Padres); LF Jonny Gomes (signed as a free agent); OF Eury Pérez (claimed off waivers from Yankees); OF Dian Toscano (signed as a free agent); OF Zoilo Almonte (signed as a free agent); RF Nick Markakis (signed as free agent); RHP Chien-Ming Wang (Minor League free agent); RHR Michael Kohn (Minor League free agent); LHP Wandy Rodríguez (Minor League free agent); LHP Eric Stults (Minor League free agent); RHR Matt Capps (Minor league free agent); LHR Donnie Veal (Minor League free agent); RHR José Veras (Minor League free agent); RHR Todd Coffey (Minor League free agent); C Jesús Flores (Minor League free agent); C John Buck (Minor League free agent); INF Pedro Ciriaco (Minor League free agent); INF/OF Kelly Johnson (Minor League free agent); 2B/OF Eric Young, Jr. (Minor League free agent)
Personnel	General Manager Frank Wren (terminated); Hitting Coach Greg Walker (resigned); Asst. Hitting Coach Scott Fletcher (contract not renewed); Third base Coach Doug Dascenzo (contract not renewed)	Acting General Manager John Hart; Hitting coach Kevin Seitzer; Asst. hitting coach José Castro; Third base coach Bo Porter

== Season summary ==
=== Opening Day ===
Position	Name
Center Fielder	Eric Young, Jr.
Second Baseman	Jace Peterson
Right Fielder	Nick Markakis
First Baseman	Freddie Freeman
Catcher	Christian Bethancourt
Left Fielder	Kelly Johnson
Third Baseman	Alberto Callaspo
Shortstop	Andrelton Simmons
Starting Pitcher	Julio Teherán

After an offseason filled with many trades and roster movements, the Braves began the season with Julio Teherán as the starting pitcher for the second consecutive year. They took an early lead in the first inning after a Nick Markakis single scored Jace Peterson. Miami tied the game in the third inning, but a late Markakis RBI scoring Eric Young, Jr. was the difference. In the team's first save opportunity since trading closer Craig Kimbrel, newly appointed closer Jason Grilli pitched a perfect inning and the Braves won 2–1.

=== Regular season ===
After optimistically winning the first five games of the season, the Braves' early success was short-lived. The team finished April with a 10–12 record. They had a winning record in May (15–13), but struggles within the young roster made quality starts and wins few and far between. A July 11 injury to closer Jason Grilli sealed the fate of the struggling team, lacking the skills necessary for a successful starting rotation. An 8–20 August followed, and after additional movements and trades, the team's starting rotation was virtually unrecognizable from how the season began. Shelby Miller, once thought to be a crucial starting pitcher to the team's success, lost a franchise-record 24 consecutive starts, finishing the season with a 6–17 record after receiving a run support average of 2.38 (ranked tenth worst in MLB history).

The Braves finished the season with a 67–95 record, third-worst in the MLB, ahead of the Cincinnati Reds (64–98) and Philadelphia Phillies (63–99).

== Season standings ==
=== National League East ===
NL East
Team	W	L	Pct.	GB	Home	Road
New York Mets	90	72	.556	—	49‍–‍32	41‍–‍40
Washington Nationals	83	79	.512	7	46‍–‍35	37‍–‍44
Miami Marlins	71	91	.438	19	41‍–‍40	30‍–‍51
Atlanta Braves	67	95	.414	23	42‍–‍39	25‍–‍56
Philadelphia Phillies	63	99	.389	27	37‍–‍44	26‍–‍55

=== National League Wild Card ===
Division leaders
Team	W	L	Pct.
St. Louis Cardinals	100	62	.617
Los Angeles Dodgers	92	70	.568
New York Mets	90	72	.556

Wild Card teams (Top 2 teams qualify for postseason)
Team	W	L	Pct.	GB
Pittsburgh Pirates	98	64	.605	+1
Chicago Cubs	97	65	.599	—
San Francisco Giants	84	78	.519	13
Washington Nationals	83	79	.512	14
Arizona Diamondbacks	79	83	.488	18
San Diego Padres	74	88	.457	23
Miami Marlins	71	91	.438	26
Milwaukee Brewers	68	94	.420	29
Colorado Rockies	68	94	.420	29
Atlanta Braves	67	95	.414	30
Cincinnati Reds	64	98	.395	33
Philadelphia Phillies	63	99	.389	34

=== Record vs. opponents ===
2015 National League record Source: MLB Standings Grid – 2015
Team	AZ	ATL	CHC	CIN	COL	LAD	MIA	MIL	NYM	PHI	PIT	SD	SF	STL	WSH	AL
Arizona	—	3–3	2–4	6–1	13–6	6–13	5–2	5–2	2–5	2–4	1–5	9–10	11–8	0–7	3–4	11–9
Atlanta	3–3	—	1–6	3–4	1–6	3–3	10–9	5–2	8–11	11–8	2–4	2–5	3–4	4–2	5–14	6–14
Chicago	4–2	6–1	—	13–6	4–2	3–4	3–3	14–5	7–0	2–5	11–8	3–3	5–2	8–11	4–3	10–10
Cincinnati	1–6	4–3	6–13	—	2–4	1–6	3–4	9–10	0–7	4–2	11–8	2–4	2–5	7–12	5–1	7–13
Colorado	6–13	6–1	2–4	4–2	—	8–11	2–5	5–1	0–7	5–2	1–6	7–12	11–8	3–4	3–3	5–15
Los Angeles	13–6	3–3	4–3	6–1	11–8	—	4–2	4–3	3–4	5–2	1–5	14–5	8–11	2–5	4–2	10–10
Miami	2–5	9–10	3–3	4–3	5–2	2–4	—	4–2	8–11	9–10	1–6	2–5	5–2	1–5	9–10	7–13
Milwaukee	2–5	2–5	5–14	10–9	1–5	3–4	2–4	—	3–3	7–0	10–9	5–2	1–5	6–13	3–4	8–12
New York	5–2	11–8	0–7	7–0	7–0	4–3	11–8	3–3	—	14–5	0–6	2–4	3–3	3–4	11–8	9–11
Philadelphia	4–2	8–11	5–2	2–4	2–5	2–5	10–9	0–7	5–14	—	2–5	5–1	1–5	2–5	7–12	8–12
Pittsburgh	5–1	4–2	8–11	8–11	6–1	5–1	6–1	9–10	6–0	5–2	—	5–2	6–1	9–10	3–4	13–7
San Diego	10–9	5–2	3–3	4–2	12–7	5–14	5–2	2–5	4–2	1–5	2–5	—	8–11	4–3	2–5	7–13
San Francisco	8–11	4–3	2–5	5–2	8–11	11–8	2–5	5–1	3–3	5–1	1–6	11–8	—	2–4	4–3	13–7
St. Louis	7–0	2–4	11–8	12–7	4–3	5–2	5–1	13–6	4–3	5–2	10–9	3–4	4–2	—	4–2	11–9
Washington	4–3	14–5	3–4	1–5	3–3	2–4	10–9	4–3	8–11	12–7	4–3	5–2	3–4	2–4	—	8–12

== Game log ==
2015 Game Log (67–95)
April: 10–12 (Home: 4–6; Away: 6–6)

#	Date	Opponent	Score	Win	Loss	Save	Attendance	Record	Box/Streak
1	April 6	@ Marlins	2–1	**Teherán** (1–0)	Álvarez (0–1)	**Grilli** (1)	36,969	1–0	W1
2	April 7	@ Marlins	12–2	**Wood** (1–0)	Latos (0–1)	—	17,483	2–0	W2
3	April 8	@ Marlins	2–0	**Cunniff** (1–0)	Koehler (0–1)	**Grilli** (2)	16,127	3–0	W3
4	April 10	Mets	5–3	**Johnson** (1–0)	Montero (0–1)	**Grilli** (3)	46,729	4–0	W4
5	April 11	Mets	5–3	**Teherán** (2–0)	Gee (0–1)	**Johnson** (1)	36,056	5–0	W5
6	April 12	Mets	3–4	Colón (2–0)	**Jaime** (0–1)	Familia (1)	28,192	5–1	L1
7	April 13	Marlins	3–2	**Miller** (1–0)	Latos (0–2)	**Grilli** (4)	13,417	6–1	W1
8	April 14	Marlins	2–8	Koehler (1–1)	**Cahill** (0–1)	—	15,765	6–2	L1
9	April 15	Marlins	2–6	Haren (1–0)	**Stults** (0–1)	—	18,342	6–3	L2
10	April 17	@ Blue Jays	8–7	**Martin** (1–0)	Cecil (0–1)	**Grilli** (5)	21,397	7–3	W1
11	April 18	@ Blue Jays	5–6 (10)	Cecil (1–1)	**Marimón** (0–1)	—	34,743	7–4	L1
12	April 19	@ Blue Jays	5–2	**Miller** (2–0)	Norris (1–1)	**Grilli** (6)	44,794	8–4	W1
13	April 21	@ Mets	1–7	Niese (2–0)	**Cahill** (0–2)	—	21,033	8–5	L1
14	April 22	@ Mets	2–3	Carlyle (1–0)	**Johnson** (1–1)	Familia (7)	20,971	8–6	L2
15	April 23	@ Mets	3–6	Colón (4–0)	**Teherán** (2–1)	Familia (8)	23,980	8–7	L3
16	April 24	@ Phillies	0–1	Giles (1–0)	**Johnson** (1–2)	—	21,164	8–8	L4
17	April 25	@ Phillies	5–2	**Miller** (3–0)	Buchanan (0–4)	**Grilli** (7)	24,748	9–8	W1
18	April 26	@ Phillies	4–5	Williams (2–1)	**Cahill** (0–3)	Papelbon (4)	28,702	9–9	L1
19	April 27	Nationals	8–4	**Stults** (1–1)	Fister (1–1)	—	16,658	10–9	W1
20	April 28	Nationals	12–13	Treinen (1–2)	**Grilli** (0–1)	Storen (5)	14,833	10–10	L1
21	April 29	Nationals	4–13	Zimmermann (2–2)	**Wood** (1–1)	—	12,595	10–11	L2
22	April 30	Reds	1–5	Leake (1–1)	**Miller** (3–1)	—	15,744	10–12	L3

May: 15–13 (Home: 8–4; Away: 7–9)

#	Date	Opponent	Score	Win	Loss	Save	Attendance	Record	Box/Streak
23	May 1	Reds	4–3	**Foltynewicz** (1–0)	DeSclafani (2–2)	**Grilli** (8)	30,153	11–12	W1
24	May 2	Reds	4–8	Marquis (3–1)	**Stults** (1–2)	—	29,515	11–13	L1
25	May 3	Reds	5–0	**Teherán** (3–1)	Cueto (2–3)	—	30,073	12–13	W1
26	May 4	Phillies	2–5	Harang (3–2)	**Wood** (1–2)	—	17,293	12–14	L1
27	May 5	Phillies	9–0	**Miller** (4–1)	Billingsley (0–1)	—	14,451	13–14	W1
28	May 6	Phillies	7–5	**Foltynewicz** (2–0)	Williams (2–2)	**Grilli** (9)	17,772	14–14	W2
29	May 8	@ Nationals	2–9	Gonzalez (3–2)	**Stults** (1–3)	—	31,288	14–15	L1
30	May 9	@ Nationals	6–8	Storen (1–0)	**Martin** (1–1)	—	39,193	14–16	L2
31	May 10	@ Nationals	4–5	Solis (1–0)	**Martin** (1–2)	Storen (9)	31,938	14–17	L3
32	May 11	@ Reds	2–1	**Avilán** (1–0)	Chapman (1–2)	**Johnson** (2)	19,881	15–17	W1
33	May 12	@ Reds	3–4	Chapman (2–2)	**Grilli** (0–2)	—	23,780	15–18	L1
34	May 13	@ Reds	1–5	Iglesias (1–0)	**Stults** (1–4)	—	17,747	15–19	L2
35	May 15	@ Marlins	5–3	**Martin** (2–2)	Dunn (0–2)	**Grilli** (10)	18,334	16–19	W1
36	May 16	@ Marlins	5–3	**Wood** (2–2)	Latos (1–4)	**Grilli** (11)	18,166	17–19	W2
37	May 17	@ Marlins	6–0	**Miller** (5–1)	Álvarez (0–3)	—	23,075	18–19	W3
38	May 19	Rays	3–5	Ramírez (2–1)	**Foltynewicz** (2–1)	Boxberger (11)	20,120	18–20	L1
39	May 20	Rays	2–1	**Cunniff** (2–0)	Odorizzi (3–4)	**Grilli** (12)	24,549	19–20	W1
40	May 21	Brewers	10–1	**Teherán** (4–1)	Garza (2–6)	—	18,239	20–20	W2
41	May 22	Brewers	0–11	Blazek (4–1)	**Stults** (1–5)	—	25,774	20–21	L1
42	May 23	Brewers	3–2 (11)	**Avilán** (2–0)	Kintzler (0–1)	—	33,223	21–21	W1
43	May 24	Brewers	2–1	**Foltynewicz** (3–1)	Nelson (2–5)	**Grilli** (13)	30,612	22–21	W2
44	May 25	@ Dodgers	3–6	Liberatore (1–1)	**Masset** (0–1)	Jansen (4)	44,680	22–22	L1
45	May 26	@ Dodgers	0–8	Kershaw (3–3)	**Teherán** (4–2)	—	40,667	22–23	L2
46	May 27	@ Dodgers	3–2	**Wood** (3–2)	Hatcher (1–4)	**Grilli** (14)	37,873	23–23	W1
47	May 28	@ Giants	0–7	Heston (5–3)	**Miller** (5–2)	—	41,040	23–24	L1
48	May 29	@ Giants	2–4	Hudson (3–4)	**Foltynewicz** (3–2)	Casilla (15)	41,311	23–25	L2
49	May 30	@ Giants	8–0	**Pérez** (1–0)	Lincecum (5–3)	—	42,005	24–25	W1
50	May 31	@ Giants	7–5	**Masset** (1–1)	Casilla (4–1)	**Grilli** (15)	41,553	25–25	W2

June: 11–16 (Home: 7–6; Away: 4–10)

#	Date	Opponent	Score	Win	Loss	Save	Attendance	Record	Box/Streak
51	June 1	@ D-backs	8–1	**Wood** (4–2)	Bradley (2–3)	—	18,258	26–25	W3
52	June 2	@ D-backs	6–7	Chafin (3–0)	**Cunniff** (2–1)	Ziegler (4)	17,101	26–26	L1
53	June 3	@ D-backs	8–9	Chafin (4–0)	**Johnson** (1–3)	Ziegler (5)	17,717	26–27	L2
54	June 5	Pirates	8–10	Morton (3–0)	**Avilán** (2–1)	Melancon (17)	27,508	26–28	L3
55	June 6	Pirates	5–4	**Grilli** (1–2)	Worley (2–4)	—	33,268	27–28	W1
56	June 7	Pirates	0–3	Cole (9–2)	**Wood** (4–3)	Melancon (18)	24,146	27–29	L1
57	June 8	Padres	3–5 (11)	Maurer (3–0)	**Martin** (2–3)	Kimbrel (14)	21,458	27–30	L2
58	June 9	Padres	6–5	**Johnson** (2–3)	Benoit (4–3)	**Grilli** (16)	24,049	28–30	W1
59	June 10	Padres	4–1	**Pérez** (2–0)	Ross (3–6)	**Johnson** (3)	21,465	29–30	W2
60	June 11	Padres	4–6 (11)	Thayer (2–0)	**Cunniff** (2–2)	Kimbrel (15)	21,465	29–31	L1
61	June 12	@ Mets	3–5	Colón (9–4)	**Wood** (4–4)	Familia (18)	32,554	29–32	L2
62	June 13	@ Mets	5–3 (11)	**Grilli** (2–2)	Torres (2–3)	**Pérez** (1)	37,734	30–32	W1
63	June 14	@ Mets	8–10	Gilmartin (1–0)	**Avilán** (2–2)	Familia (19)	36,340	30–33	L1
64	June 15	@ Red Sox	4–2	**Pérez** (3–0)	Porcello (4–7)	**Grilli** (17)	34,439	31–33	W1
65	June 16	@ Red Sox	4–9	Miley (6–6)	**Teherán** (4–3)	—	35,662	31–34	L1
66	June 17	Red Sox	5–2	**Masset** (2–1)	Tazawa (0–3)	**Grilli** (18)	28,902	32–34	W1
67	June 18	Red Sox	2–5	Buchholz (4–6)	**Miller** (5–3)	Uehara (14)	31,783	32–35	L1
68	June 19	Mets	2–1	**Wisler** (1–0)	deGrom (7–5)	**Grilli** (19)	28,853	33–35	W1
69	June 20	Mets	6–4	**Perez** (4–0)	Leathersich (0–1)	**Grilli** (20)	40,733	34-35	W2
70	June 21	Mets	1–0	**Teherán** (5–3)	Harvey (7–5)	**Johnson** (4)	30,268	35–35	W3
71	June 23	@ Nationals	1–3	Strasburg (4–5)	**Wood** (4–5)	Storen (21)	28,344	35–36	L1
72	June 24	@ Nationals	1–2 (11)	Rivero (1–0)	**Eveland** (0–1)	—	36,141	35–37	L2
73	June 25	@ Nationals	0–7	Fister (3–3)	**Wisler** (1–1)	—	37,874	35–38	L3
74	June 26	@ Pirates	2–3 (10)	Melancon (1–1)	**Grilli** (2–3)	—	34,220	35–39	L4
75	June 27	@ Pirates	4–8	Morton (6–1)	Teherán (5–4)	—	36,417	35–40	L5
76	June 28	@ Pirates	2–1	**Wood** (5–5)	Locke (4–4)	**Grilli** (21)	36,082	36–40	W1
77	June 30	Nationals	1–6	Zimmermann (6–5)	**Miller** (5–4)	—	23,961	36–41	L1

July: 10–16 (Home: 7–4; Away: 3–12)

#	Date	Opponent	Score	Win	Loss	Save	Attendance	Record	Box/Streak
78	July 1	Nationals	4–1	**Wisler** (2–1)	Fister (3–4)	**Grilli** (22)	19,393	37–41	W1
79	July 2	Nationals	2–1	**Grilli** (3–3)	Scherzer (9–6)	—	18,585	38–41	W2
80	July 3	Phillies	2–1	**Teherán** (6–4)	Morgan (1–1)	**Johnson** (5)	33,090	39–41	W3
81	July 4	Phillies	9–5	**Wood** (6–5)	Correia (0–3)	—	34,401	40–41	W4
82	July 5	Phillies	0–4 (10)	García (3–3)	Masset (2–2)	—	18,763	40–42	L1
83	July 6	@ Brewers	5–3	**Wisler** (3–1)	Lohse (5–10)	**Grilli** (23)	25,046	41–42	W1
84	July 7	@ Brewers	4–3	**Banuelos** (1–0)	Cravy (0–2)	**Grilli** (24)	33,388	42–42	W2
85	July 8	@ Brewers	5–6	Jeffress (3–0)	**Avilán** (2–3)	Rodríguez (19)	33,338	42–43	L1
86	July 9	@ Rockies	3–5	Hale (3–4)	**Brigham** (0–1)	Axford (15)	30,334	42–44	L2
87	July 10	@ Rockies	3–5	Laffey (1–0)	**Miller** (5–5)	Axford (16)	48,254	42–45	L3
88	July 11	@ Rockies	2–3	Hawkins (2–1)	**Grilli** (3–4)	—	40,620	42–46	L4
89	July 12	@ Rockies	3–11	Bettis (5–4)	**Wood** (6–6)	—	37,047	42–47	L5
ASG	**86th All-Star Game** at Great American Ball Park in Cincinnati, Ohio, United States								Box
ASG	July 14	American 6, **National** 3		Price (AL, DET)	Kershaw (NL, LAD)	—	43,656	—	Box
ASG	Representing the Atlanta Braves: Shelby Miller								Box
90	July 17	Cubs	4–2	**Vizcaíno** (1–0)	Strop (1–5)	**Johnson** (6)	42,532	43–47	W1
91	July 18	Cubs	0–4	Lester (5–8)	**Banuelos** (1–1)	—	45,758	43–48	L1
92	July 19	Cubs	1–4	Arrieta (11–5)	**Miller** (5–6)	—	31,690	43–49	L2
93	July 20	Dodgers	7–5	**Wisler** (4–1)	Liberatore (2–2)	**Johnson** (7)	24,072	44–49	W1
94	July 21	Dodgers	4–3	**Wood** (7–6)	Tsao (1–1)	**Johnson** (8)	33,816	45–49	W2
95	July 22	Dodgers	1–3	Bolsinger (5–3)	**Teherán** (6–5)	Jansen (17)	24,112	45–50	L1
96	July 24	@ Cardinals	2–4	Cooney (1–0)	**Banuelos** (1–2)	Siegrist (5)	44,778	45–51	L2
97	July 25	@ Cardinals	0–1	Martinez (11–4)	**Miller** (5–7)	Choate (1)	45,862	45–52	L3
98	July 26	@ Cardinals	3–2	**Wisler** (5–1)	Wacha (11–4)	**Johnson** (9)	44,780	46–52	W1
99	July 27	@ Orioles	1–2 (11)	Brach (4–2)	**Avilán** (2–4)	—	26,256	46–53	L1
100	July 28	@ Orioles	3–7	Jiménez (8–6)	**Teherán** (6–5)	—	28,592	46–54	L2
101	July 29	@ Orioles	0–2	Tillman (8–7)	**Foltynewicz** (3–3)	Britton (26)	29,238	46–55	L3
102	July 30	@ Phillies	1–4	Harang (5–11)	**Miller** (5–8)	Giles (2)	21,706	46–56	L4
103	July 31	@ Phillies	3–9	Buchanan (2–5)	**Perez** (4–1)	—	29,290	46–57	L5

August: 8–20 (Home: 7–10; Away: 1–10)

#	Date	Opponent	Score	Win	Loss	Save	Attendance	Record	Box/Streak
104	August 1	@ Phillies	2–12	Nola (2–1)	**Wisler** (5–2)	—	25,523	46–58	L6
105	August 2	@ Phillies	6–2	**Teherán** (7–6)	Morgan (2–3)	—	24,361	47–58	W1
106	August 3	Giants	9–8 (12)	**Vizcaíno** (2–0)	Vogelsong (7–7)	—	23,428	48–58	W2
107	August 4	Giants	3–8	Affeldt (1–2)	**Aardsma** (0–1)	—	18,411	48–59	L1
108	August 5	Giants	1–6	Bumgarner (12–6)	**Perez** (4–2)	—	17,444	48–60	L2
109	August 6	Marlins	9–8	**McKirahan** (10)	Morris (33)	**Vizcaíno** (1)	18,548	49–60	W1
110	August 7	Marlins	6–3	**Detwiler** (1–5)	Flores (0–1)	**Vizcaíno** (2)	22,769	50–60	W2
111	August 8	Marlins	7–2	**Foltynewicz** (4–3)	Koehler (89)	—	42,544	51–60	W3
112	August 9	Marlins	1–4	Hand (2–2)	**Miller** (5–9)	Ramos (18)	24,610	51–61	L1
113	August 11	@ Rays	0–2	Ramírez (9–4)	**Perez** (4–2)	Cedeño (1)	15,506	51–62	L2
114	August 12	@ Rays	6–9	Colomé (5–4)	**Marksberry** (0–1)	Boxberger (29)	16,337	51–63	L3
115	August 14	D-backs	3–2	**Teherán** (8–6)	Ray (3–8)	**Vizcaíno** (3)	31,917	52–63	W1
116	August 15	D-backs	4–8	Corbin (3–3)	**Foltynewicz** (4–4)	—	29,624	52–64	L1
117	August 16	D-backs	2–1 (10)	**Aardsma** (1–1)	Hernandez (0–3)	—	20,840	53–64	W1
118	August 17	@ Padres	3–5	Rea (2–0)	**Perez** (4–4)	Kimbrel (34)	23,716	53–65	L1
119	August 18	@ Padres	0–9	Shields (9–5)	**Wisler** (5–3)	—	28,395	53–66	L2
120	August 19	@ Padres	2–3	Kelley (2–2)	**Marksberry** (0–2)	Kimbrel (35)	20,732	53–67	L3
121	August 20	@ Cubs	1–7	Arrieta (15–6)	**Foltynewicz** (4–5)	—	34,633	53–68	L4
122	August 21	@ Cubs	3–5	Motte (8–1)	**Miller** (5–10)	Rondón (22)	39,211	53–69	L5
123	August 22	@ Cubs	7–9	Strop (2–6)	**Jackson** (2–2)	Rondón (23)	41,196	53–70	L6
124	August 23	@ Cubs	3–9	Hammel (7–5)	**Wisler** (5–4)	—	39,581	53–71	L7
125	August 24	Rockies	5–3	**Teherán** (9–6)	de la Rosa (7–6)	**Vizcaíno** (4)	13,920	54–71	W1
126	August 25	Rockies	1–5	Bettis (6–4)	**Foltynewicz** (4–6)	—	13,863	54–72	L1
127	August 26	Rockies	3–6	Castro (1–0)	**Miller** (5–11)	Axford (18)	18,328	54–73	L2
128	August 28	Yankees	4–15	Tanaka (10–6)	**Perez** (4–5)	—	35,546	54–74	L3
129	August 29	Yankees	1–3	Severino (2–2)	**Wisler** (5–5)	Miller (28)	49,243	54–75	L4
130	August 30	Yankees	6–20	Eovaldi (14–2)	**Teherán** (9–6)	—	33,093	54–76	L5
131	August 31	Marlins	0–4	Narveson (2–1)	**Miller** (5–12)	—	12,916	54–77	L6

September: 10–17 (Home: 6–8; Away: 4–9)

#	Date	Opponent	Score	Win	Loss	Save	Attendance	Record	Box/Streak
132	September 1	Marlins	1–7	Nicolino (3–2)	**Banuelos** (1–3)	—	16,386	54–78	L7
133	September 2	Marlins	3–7	Conley (3–1)	**Perez** (4–6)	—	17,949	54–79	L8
134	September 3	@ Nationals	1–15	Zimmermann (12–8)	**Wisler** (5–6)	—	28,627	54–80	L9
135	September 4	@ Nationals	2–5 (10)	Papelbon (3–1)	**Marksberry** (0–3)	—	23,536	54–81	L10
136	September 5	@ Nationals	2–8	Gonzalez (10–7)	**Miller** (5–13)	—	28,646	54–82	L11
137	September 6	@ Nationals	4–8	Rivero (2–1)	**Banuelos** (1–4)	—	29,281	54–83	L12
138	September 7	@ Phillies	7–2	**Perez** (5–6)	Harang (5–15)	—	15,125	55–83	W1
139	September 8	@ Phillies	0–5	Nola (6–2)	**Weber** (0–1)	Giles (12)	15,610	55–84	L1
140	September 9	@ Phillies	8–1	**Teherán** (10–6)	Buchanan (2–8)	—	15,241	56–84	W1
141	September 10	Mets	2–7	Colón (2–0)	**Miller** (5–14)	—	22,640	56–85	L1
142	September 11	Mets	1–5	Matz (3–0)	**Wisler** (5–7)	—	23,216	56–86	L2
143	September 12	Mets	4–6	Clippard (4–4)	**Vizcaíno** (2–1)	Familia (40)	27,380	56–87	L3
144	September 13	Mets	7–10 (10)	Parnell (2–3)	**Jackson** (2–3)	Reed (4)	23,786	56–88	L4
145	September 15	Blue Jays	3–2	**Vizcaíno** (3–1)	Sanchez (7–6)	—	16,399	57–88	W1
146	September 16	Blue Jays	1–9	Price (16–5)	**Miller** (5–15)	—	15,178	57–89	L1
147	September 17	Blue Jays	0–5	Estrada (13–8)	**Wisler** (5–8)	—	19,367	57–90	L2
148	September 18	Phillies	2–1	**Perez** (6–6)	Morgan (5–7)	**Vizcaíno** (5)	22,525	58–90	W1
149	September 19	Phillies	2–1	**Jackson** (3–3)	Williams (4–11)	**Vizcaíno** (6)	24,855	59–90	W2
150	September 20	Phillies	2–1	**Moylan** (1–0)	García (3–6)	—	23,723	60–90	W3
151	September 21	@ Mets	0–4	Niese (9–10)	**Miller** (5–16)	—	26,362	60–91	L1
152	September 22	@ Mets	6–2	**Wisler** (6–8)	Verrett (1–2)	—	26,227	61–91	W1
153	September 23	@ Mets	6–3	**Jackson** (4–3)	Familia (2–2)	**Vizcaíno** (7)	28,931	62–91	W2
154	September 25	@ Marlins	11–12	Fernández (6–0)	**Weber** (0–1)	Ramos (30)	24,626	62–92	L1
155	September 26	@ Marlins	2–6	Nicolino (4–4)	**Teherán** (10–9)	—	24,449	62–93	L2
156	September 27	@ Marlins	5–9	Koehler (11–14)	**Miller** (5–16)	—	27,702	62–94	L3
157	September 29	Nationals	2–1	**Wisler** (7–8)	Roark (4–7)	**Vizcaíno** (8)	15,272	63–94	W1
158	September 30	Nationals	2–0	**Pérez** (7–6)	Zimmermann (13–10)	**Vizcaíno** (9)	13,860	64–94	W2

October: 3–1 (Home: 3–1; Away: 0–0)

#	Date	Opponent	Score	Win	Loss	Save	Attendance	Record	Box/Streak
159	October 1	Nationals	0–3	Strasburg (11–7)	**Weber** (0–3)	Rivero (1)	37,790	64–95	L1
160	October 2	Cardinals	4–0	**Teherán** (11–8)	García (10–6)	—	24,481	65–95	W1
	October 3	Cardinals	Postponed (rain); rescheduled for October 4						
161	October 4	Cardinals	6–0	**Miller** (6–17)	Lackey (13–10)	—		66–95	W2
162	October 4	Cardinals	2–0	**Wisler** (8–8)	Lynn (12–11)	**Jackson** (1)	31,441	67–95	W3

Legend: = Win = Loss = Postponement
Bold = Braves team member

== Roster ==
2015 Atlanta Braves
Roster
Pitchers: 32 David Aardsma; 43 Luis Avilán; 60 Manny Banuelos; 63 Jake Brigham; 67 Danny Burawa; 34 Trevor Cahill; 57 David Carpenter; 51 John Cornely; 50 Brandon Cunniff; 56 Ross Detwiler; 56 Dana Eveland; 48 Mike Foltynewicz; 51 Jason Frasor; 39 Jason Grilli; 34 Edwin Jackson; 56 Juan Jaime; 53 Jim Johnson; 64 Ryan Kelly; 58 Michael Kohn; 54 Sugar Ray Marimón; 66 Matt Marksberry; 57 Cody Martin; 51 Nick Masset; 52 Andrew McKirahan; 17 Shelby Miller; 58 Peter Moylan; 61 Williams Pérez; 37 Eric Stults; 49 Julio Teherán; 60 Ian Thomas; 32 Donnie Veal; 38 Arodys Vizcaíno; 68 Ryan Weber; 70 Daniel Winkler; 37 Matt Wisler; 40 Alex Wood	Catchers: 27 Christian Bethancourt; 30 Ryan Lavarnway; 15 A. J. Pierzynski; Infielders: 1 Alberto Callaspo; 11,14 Daniel Castro; 13 Pedro Ciriaco; 5 Freddie Freeman; 14,24 Adonis García; 11 Phil Gosselin; 23 Chris Johnson; 24 Kelly Johnson; 28 Héctor Olivera; 8 Jace Peterson; 19 Andrelton Simmons; 28,53 Joey Terdoslavich; 2 Juan Uribe	Outfielders: 2 Michael Bourn; 26 Todd Cunningham; 7 Jonny Gomes; 22 Nick Markakis; 25 Cameron Maybin; 14 Eury Pérez; 23 Nick Swisher; 4 Eric Young	Manager: 33 Fredi González; Coaches: 65 Alan Butts (bullpen catcher); 59 José Castro (assistant hitting); 45 Roger McDowell (pitching); 9 Terry Pendleton (first base); 12 Eddie Pérez (bullpen); 16 Bo Porter (third base); 62 Horacio Ramírez (assistant coach); 20 Kevin Seitzer (hitting); 18 Carlos Tosca (bench)

== Player stats ==
=== Batting ===
Note: G = Games played; AB = At bats; R = Runs; H = Hits; 2B = Doubles; 3B = Triples; HR = Home runs; RBI = Runs batted in; SB = Stolen bases; BB = Walks; AVG = Batting average; SLG = Slugging average

Player	G	AB	R	H	2B	3B	HR	RBI	SB	BB	AVG	SLG
Nick Markakis	156	612	73	181	38	1	3	53	2	70	.296	.376
Andrelton Simmons	147	535	60	142	23	2	4	44	5	39	.265	.338
Jace Peterson	152	528	55	126	23	5	6	52	12	56	.239	.335
Cameron Maybin	141	505	65	135	18	2	10	59	23	45	.267	.370
Freddie Freeman	118	416	62	115	27	0	18	66	3	56	.276	.471
A. J. Pierzynski	113	407	38	122	24	1	9	49	0	19	.300	.430
Jonny Gomes	83	195	27	43	7	0	7	22	1	28	.221	.364
Adonis García	58	191	20	53	12	0	10	26	0	5	.277	.497
Kelly Johnson	62	182	20	50	5	0	9	34	1	13	.275	.451
Christian Bethancourt	48	155	16	31	8	0	2	12	1	5	.200	.290
Chris Johnson	56	153	12	36	7	0	2	11	2	7	.235	.320
Juan Uribe	46	151	17	43	6	0	7	17	1	15	.285	.464
Pedro Ciriaco	84	142	14	37	8	1	1	15	4	2	.261	.352
Michael Bourn	46	136	10	30	3	1	0	11	4	17	.221	.257
Eury Pérez	47	119	10	32	4	0	0	5	3	7	.269	.303
Nick Swisher	46	118	8	23	5	0	4	17	0	27	.195	.339
Alberto Callaspo	37	107	12	22	2	0	1	8	0	14	.206	.252
Daniel Castro	33	96	14	23	2	1	2	5	0	3	.240	.344
Todd Cunningham	39	86	13	19	4	0	0	4	2	5	.221	.267
Héctor Olivera	24	79	4	20	4	1	2	11	0	5	.253	.405
Eric Young Jr.	35	77	7	13	4	2	0	5	3	6	.169	.273
Ryan Lavanway	27	66	5	15	5	0	2	6	0	8	.227	.394
Joey Terdoslavich	28	56	5	12	4	1	1	4	0	3	.214	.375
Phil Gosselin	20	40	2	13	4	0	0	2	2	2	.325	.425
Pitcher totals	162	268	4	25	4	0	0	10	0	14	.093	.108
Team totals	162	5420	573	1361	251	18	100	548	69	471	.251	.359

=== Pitching ===
Note: W = Wins; L = Losses; ERA = Earned run average; G = Games pitched; GS = Games started; SV = Saves; IP = Innings pitched; H = Hits allowed; R = Runs allowed; ER = Earned runs allowed; BB = Walks allowed; SO = Strikeouts

Player	W	L	ERA	G	GS	SV	IP	H	R	ER	BB	SO
Shelby Miller	6	17	3.02	33	33	0	205.1	183	82	69	73	171
Julio Teherán	11	8	4.04	33	33	0	200.2	189	99	90	73	171
Alex Wood	7	6	3.54	20	20	0	119.1	132	50	47	36	90
Williams Pérez	7	6	4.78	23	20	1	116.2	130	66	62	51	73
Matt Wisler	8	8	4.71	20	19	0	109.0	119	59	57	40	72
Mike Foltynewicz	4	6	5.71	18	15	0	86.2	112	63	55	29	77
Jim Johnson	2	3	2.25	49	0	9	48.0	45	14	12	14	33
Eric Stults	1	5	5.85	9	8	0	47.2	48	31	31	13	31
Luis Avilán	2	4	3.58	50	0	0	37.2	35	15	15	10	31
Brandon Cunniff	2	2	4.63	39	0	0	35.0	27	20	18	22	37
Jason Grilli	3	4	2.94	36	0	24	33.2	28	13	11	10	45
Arodys Vizcaíno	3	1	1.60	36	0	9	33.2	27	7	6	13	37
David Aardsma	1	1	4.70	33	0	0	30.2	25	17	16	14	35
Ryan Weber	0	3	4.76	5	5	0	28.1	25	15	15	6	19
Andrew McKirahan	1	0	5.93	27	0	0	27.1	40	18	18	10	22
Manny Bañuelos	1	4	5.13	7	6	0	26.1	30	17	15	12	19
Trevor Cahill	0	3	7.52	15	3	0	26.1	36	23	22	11	14
Sugar Ray Marimón	0	1	7.36	16	0	0	25.2	30	21	21	14	14
Edwin Jackson	2	2	2.92	24	0	1	24.2	14	11	8	9	17
Matt Marksberry	0	3	5.01	31	0	0	23.1	22	16	13	16	21
Cody Martin	2	3	5.40	21	0	0	21.2	24	13	13	7	24
Ryan Kelly	0	0	7.02	17	0	0	16.2	21	14	13	6	10
Jake Brigham	0	1	8.64	12	0	0	16.2	28	16	16	8	12
Ross Detwiler	1	0	7.63	24	0	0	15.1	20	14	13	16	13
Nick Masset	2	2	6.46	20	0	0	15.1	18	12	11	8	12
Danny Burawa	0	0	3.65	12	0	0	12.1	8	5	5	4	10
Peter Moylan	1	0	3.48	22	0	0	10.1	12	5	4	0	8
Ian Thomas	0	0	3.38	5	0	0	5.1	4	3	2	5	5
Jason Frasor	0	0	0.00	6	0	0	4.2	3	0	0	3	4
Michael Kohn	0	0	0.00	6	0	0	4.2	0	0	0	6	4
Donnie Veal	0	0	14.54	5	0	0	4.1	8	7	7	2	3
David Carpenter	0	0	7.36	4	0	0	3.2	6	3	3	0	5
Dana Eveland	0	1	5.40	10	0	0	3.1	5	2	2	3	4
Dan Winkler	0	0	10.80	2	0	0	1.2	2	2	2	1	2
Juan Jaime	0	1	6.75	2	0	0	1.1	0	1	1	4	1
John Cornely	0	0	36.00	1	0	0	1.0	3	4	4	1	1
Jonny Gomes	0	0	18.00	1	0	0	1.0	3	2	2	0	1
Team totals	67	95	4.41	162	162	44	1425.1	1462	760	698	550	1148

== Farm system ==
Level	Team	League	Manager
AAA	Gwinnett Braves	International League	Brian Snitker
AA	Mississippi Braves	Southern League	Aaron Holbert
A-Advanced	Carolina Mudcats	Carolina League	Luis Salazar
A	Rome Braves	South Atlantic League	Randy Ingle
Rookie	Danville Braves	Appalachian League	Rocket Wheeler
Rookie	GCL Braves	Arizona League	Robinson Cancel
Rookie	DSL Braves	Dominican Summer League	Francisco Santiesteban
