= Ryan Weber =

American baseball player (born 1990)

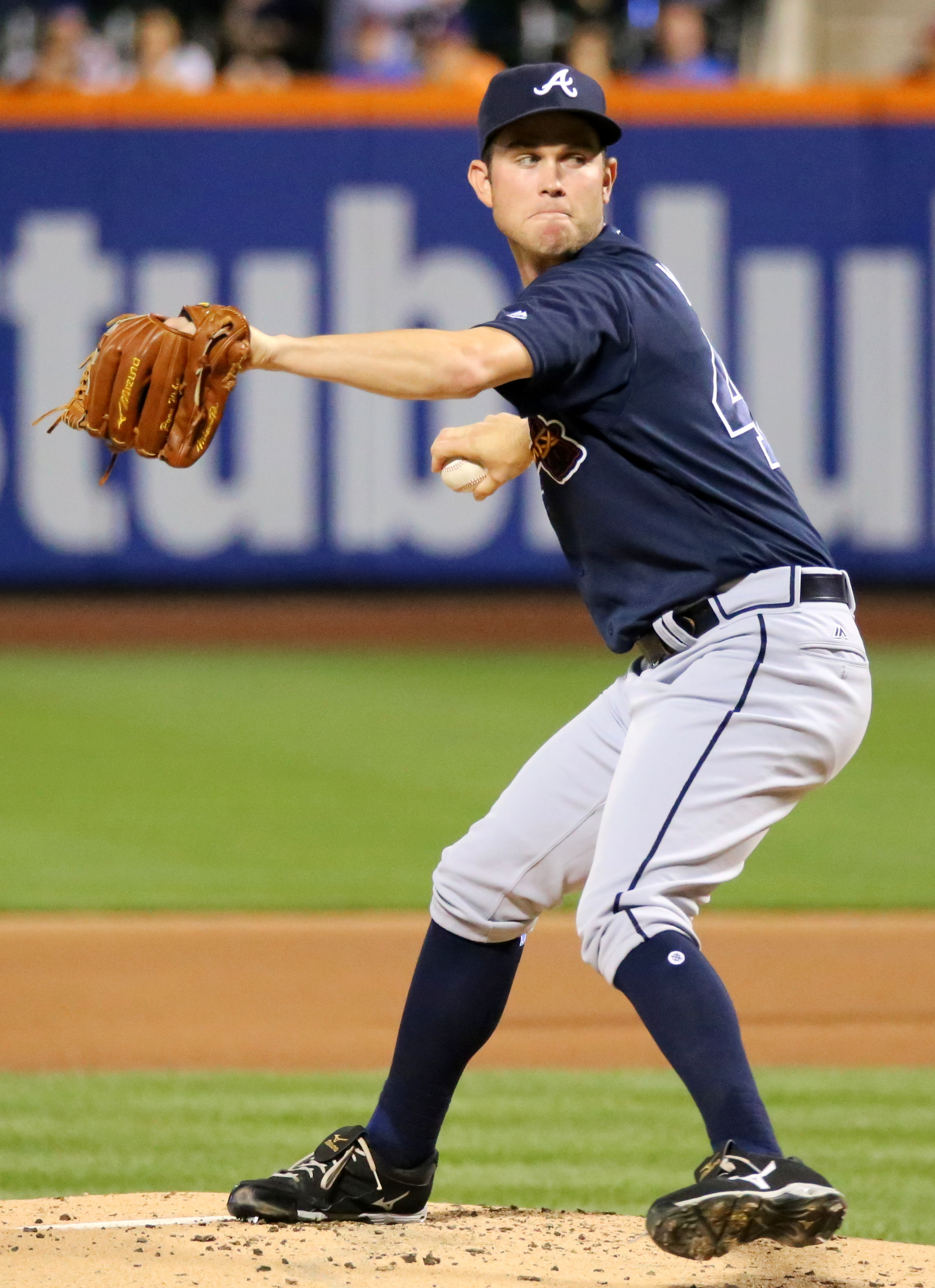
- Weber pitching for the Atlanta Braves in 2016
- Pitcher
- Born: August 12, 1990 (age 36); St. Petersburg, Florida, U.S.
- Batted: Right Threw: Right

MLB debut
- September 8, 2015, for the Atlanta Braves

Last MLB appearance
- June 2, 2023, for the New York Yankees

MLB statistics
- Win–loss record: 5–12
- Earned run average: 4.88
- Strikeouts: 117
- Stats at Baseball Reference

Teams
- Atlanta Braves (2015–2016); Seattle Mariners (2017); Tampa Bay Rays (2018); Boston Red Sox (2019–2021); Milwaukee Brewers (2021); Seattle Mariners (2021); New York Yankees (2022–2023)

James Ryan Weber (born August 12, 1990) is an American former professional baseball pitcher. He played in Major League Baseball (MLB) for the Atlanta Braves, Seattle Mariners, Tampa Bay Rays, Boston Red Sox, Milwaukee Brewers, and New York Yankees. Listed at 6 feet 1 inch (1.85 m) and 180 pounds (82 kg), he throws and bats right-handed.

== Career ==
=== Amateur career ===
Weber attended Clearwater Central Catholic High School in Clearwater, Florida. The Philadelphia Phillies selected him in the 12th round of the 2008 Major League Baseball draft. He did not sign, and attended St. Petersburg College in St. Petersburg, Florida. He was then drafted by the Atlanta Braves in the 22nd round of the 2009 MLB draft and signed. Weber was a 2016 inductee of his high school's athletic hall of fame.

=== Atlanta Braves ===
After signing with Atlanta, Weber made his professional debut with the GCL Braves, pitching to a 1.74 ERA in 7 appearances. In 2010, Weber split the year between the Rookie-level Danville Braves and the Single-A Rome Braves, accumulating a 5-7 record and 4.17 ERA in 26 games between the two teams. The next year he split the season between Rome and the High-A Lynchburg Hillcats, posting a 2.72 ERA with 35 strikeouts in 49.2 innings of work. In 2012, Weber returned to Lynchburg and Rome and posted a cumulative 7-9 record and 4.91 ERA in 35 appearances. For the 2013 season, Weber played for Lynchburg and the GCL Braves, logging a 6-6 record and 4.10 ERA with 83 strikeouts in 96.2 innings pitched. Weber spent the entire 2014 season in Double-A with the Mississippi Braves, recording a 5-6 record and 4.53 ERA in 32 games for the team.

Weber began the 2015 season with Double-A Mississippi. After posting a 2.73 ERA in 11 games, he was later promoted to the Triple-A Gwinnett Braves, and began pitching games as a starter in late August. Weber was called up to the majors for the first time on September 8, 2015, to start in place of Matt Wisler, who had been forced to pitch in relief two days prior, and subsequently missed his turn in the rotation. Weber threw six innings against the Philadelphia Phillies, yielding two runs and four hits on 76 pitches. Overall with the 2015 Braves, Weber made five appearances (all starts), compiling an 0–3 record and 4.76 ERA.

Weber was invited to spring training in 2016, and was sent to Gwinnett to start the season. At both the major and minor league levels, Weber pitched primarily in relief. He was recalled on April 18, after the team placed Gordon Beckham on the disabled list. Weber made three appearances and recorded a 10.57 ERA before returning to the minors on April 27. Jason Grilli was traded to the Toronto Blue Jays on May 31, and Weber was recalled again. Three days later, Weber was returned to Gwinnett. After a ten-day stint in the minors, Weber was recalled on June 13, only to be optioned the next day. Weber was recalled as an extra reliever and took struggling starter Matt Wisler's roster spot on July 31. On August 3, Weber was replaced with reliever Brandon Cunniff, only to be recalled on August 13. Overall with the 2016 Braves, Weber made 16 appearances (two starts), compiling a 1–1 record and 5.45 ERA.

=== Seattle Mariners ===
On November 2, 2016, Weber was claimed off waivers by the Seattle Mariners. He was designated for assignment by the Mariners on November 28, and outrighted to Triple-A on December 2. His contract was selected on May 13, 2017, so that he could make a start against the Toronto Blue Jays. Weber was placed on the disabled list the next day. Overall with the 2017 Mariners, Weber made a single appearance, allowing one run in 3 2/3 innings pitched.

=== Tampa Bay Rays ===
On January 26, 2018, Weber signed a minor league contract with the Tampa Bay Rays. He was called up by the Rays on April 9, 2018, and was designated for assignment on April 13. He was called back up on May 13, designated for assignment again on July 14, and was outrighted on July 22. Overall with the 2018 Rays, Weber made two appearances, both in relief, allowing three earned runs in 5 1/3 innings. Weber elected free agency on October 2, 2018.

=== Boston Red Sox ===
On December 21, 2018, Weber signed a minor league contract with the Boston Red Sox organization. On May 6, 2019, the Red Sox called up Weber from the Triple-A Pawtucket Red Sox when David Price was placed on the injured list. Weber made his first appearance with Boston that day, pitching four innings of scoreless relief against the Baltimore Orioles. On May 23, Weber earned his first win as a starting pitcher, holding Toronto to one run on three hits in six innings. He was optioned back to Pawtucket on June 7, called up briefly during July and August, and recalled on September 1 when rosters expanded. Overall with the 2019 Red Sox, Weber appeared in 18 games (three starts), compiling a 2–4 record with 5.09 ERA and 29 strikeouts in 40 2/3 innings.

Weber made Boston's Opening Day roster for the delayed start of the 2020 season, as a member of the starting rotation. After his first three starts, he had a 9.90 ERA and an 0–2 record; he was optioned to the team's alternate training site on August 8 and recalled on August 12. Overall with the 2020 Red Sox, Weber appeared in 16 games (five starts), compiling a 1–3 record with a 4.61 ERA and 26 strikeouts in 41 innings pitched. On November 20, 2020, Weber was designated for assignment, and was assigned outright to Triple-A five days later.

Weber started the 2021 season in Triple-A with the Worcester Red Sox. On June 13, 2021, Weber was selected to Boston's active roster. That day, he allowed 11 runs in 5 2/3 innings of work. On June 14, Weber was designated for assignment.

=== Milwaukee Brewers ===
On June 16, 2021, Weber was claimed off waivers by the Milwaukee Brewers and was assigned to the Triple-A Nashville Sounds. He was recalled and added to the Brewers' active roster on June 22. Weber recorded a scoreless inning in his only appearance with Milwaukee, and also recorded a 6.75 ERA in 2 games with the Triple-A Nashville Sounds before he was designated for assignment by Milwaukee on July 13.

=== Seattle Mariners (second stint) ===
On July 16, 2021, Weber was claimed off of waivers by the Seattle Mariners. Weber made two appearances for the Mariners, posting a 6.00 ERA with one strikeout. On October 22, Weber elected free agency.

=== New York Yankees ===
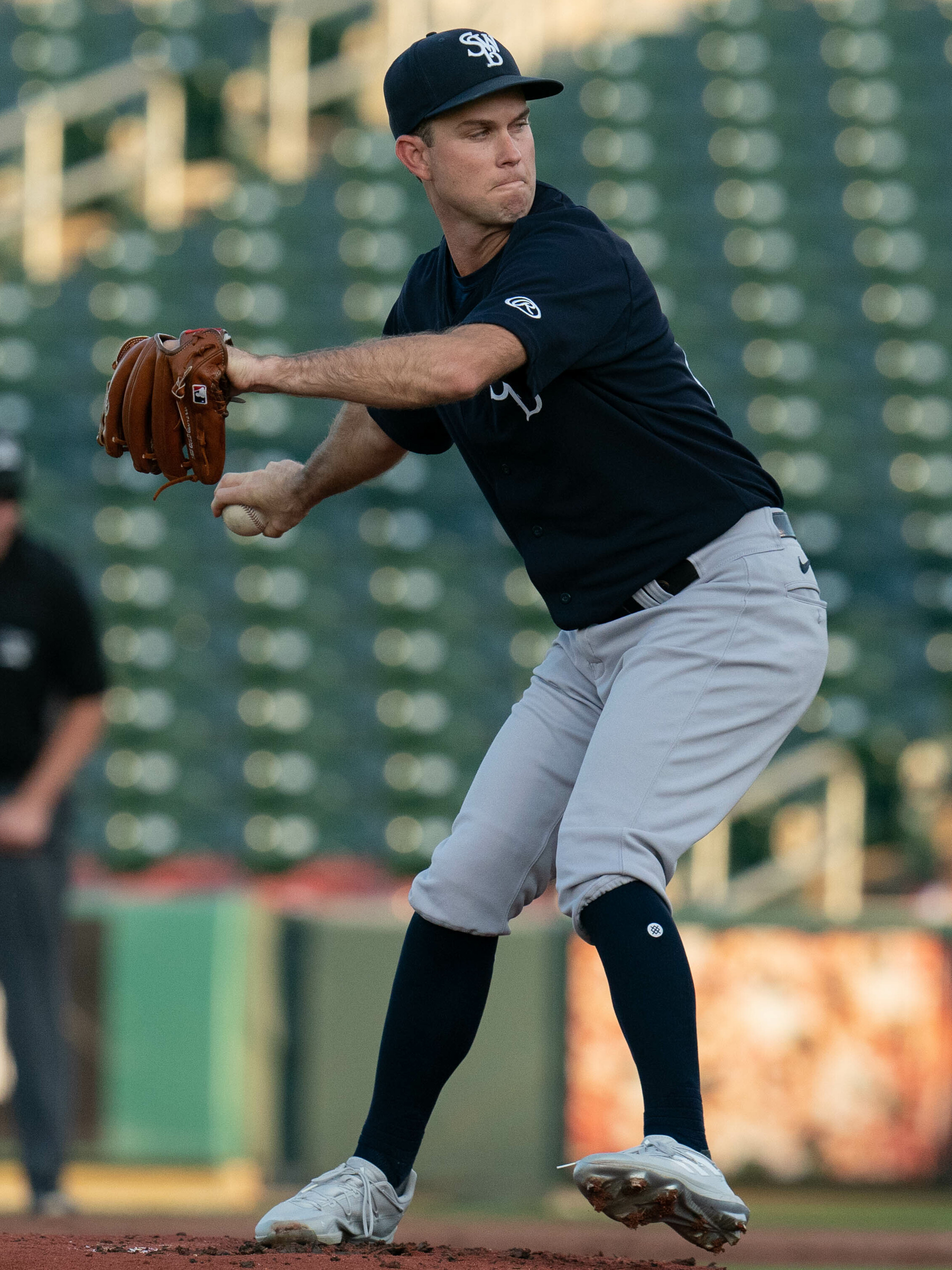
Weber with the Scranton/Wilkes-Barre RailRiders in 2022

On January 14, 2022, Weber signed a minor league contract with the New York Yankees. He began the 2022 season with the Scranton/Wilkes-Barre RailRiders, and was promoted to the major leagues on June 16. He was designated for assignment on June 17, he elected free agency on June 20 and then resigned a minor league deal on June 22. He had his contract selected again on June 29 and was designated for assignment again on July 6, after Miguel Castro was activated off of the restricted list. On July 8, he again cleared waivers and was assigned outright to Scranton. He had his contract selected again on July 14. On July 21, he was designated for assignment, after Domingo Germán was activated off of the injured list. He rejected an outright assignment and elected free agency on July 26. On July 29, Weber re–signed with the Yankees on a minor league contract. He had his contract selected yet again on September 3. On September 16, Weber was designated for assignment once more. On September 19, Weber elected free agency in lieu of an outright assignment.

On December 15, 2022, Weber re-signed with the Yankees on a minor league contract. He began the 2023 season with Triple-A Scranton, making 7 starts and posting a 3-3 record and 5.77 ERA with 26 strikeouts. On May 11, 2023, Weber had his contract selected to the active roster. In 8 games for the Yankees, he recorded a 3.14 ERA with 7 strikeouts and one save in 14 1/3 innings pitched. On June 7, he was placed on the 60–day injured list with a right forearm strain. Following the season on November 2, Weber was removed from the 40–man roster and sent outright to Triple–A Scranton. He elected free agency on November 6.
