= Scott Copeland =

American baseball player (born 1987)

- Pitcher
- Born: December 15, 1987 (age 38); Longview, Texas, U.S.
- Batted: Right Threw: Right

Professional debut
- MLB: May 2, 2015, for the Toronto Blue Jays
- KBO: April 22, 2016, for the LG Twins

Last appearance
- MLB: May 31, 2018, for the New York Mets
- KBO: July 7, 2016, for the LG Twins

MLB statistics
- Win–loss record: 1–1
- Earned run average: 5.94
- Strikeouts: 8

KBO statistics
- Win–loss record: 2–3
- Earned run average: 5.54
- Strikeouts: 34
- Stats at Baseball Reference

Teams
- Toronto Blue Jays (2015); LG Twins (2016); New York Mets (2018)

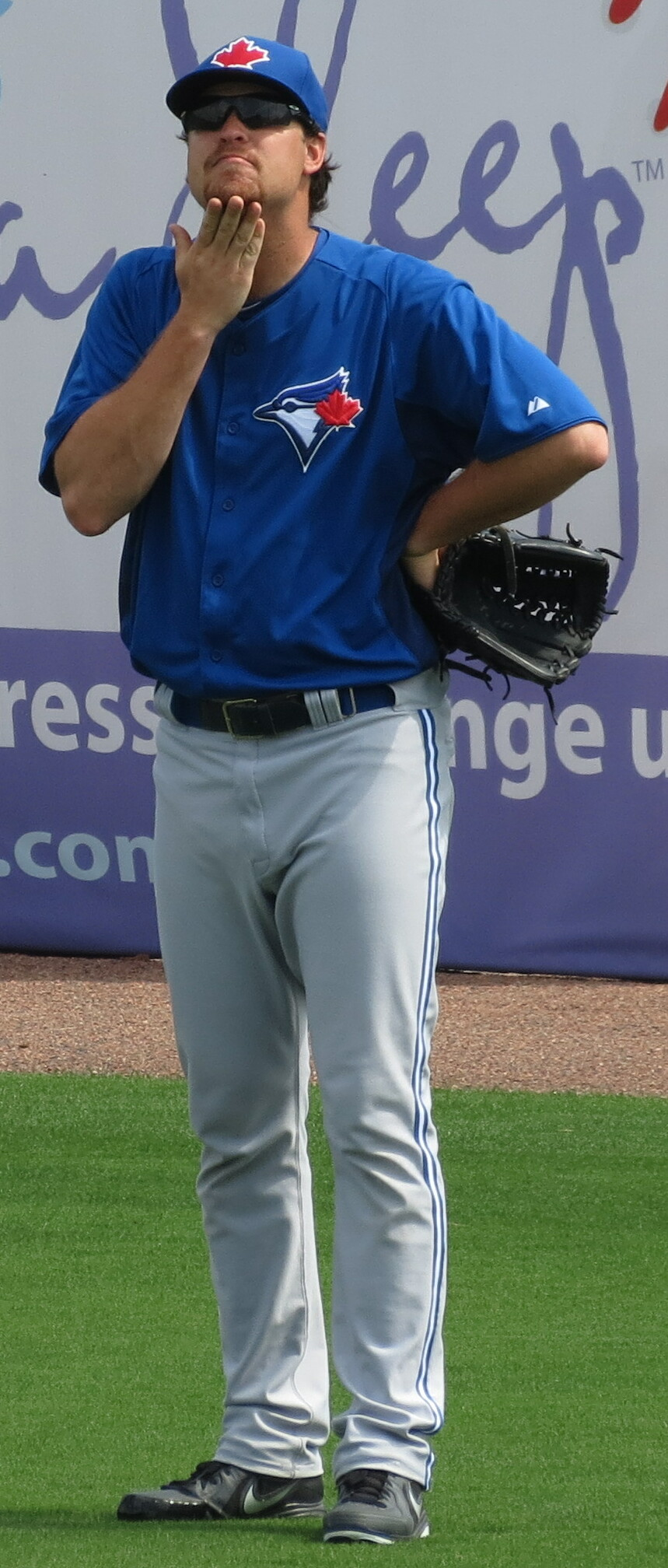
Copeland while playing for the Toronto Blue Jays

Scott Reast Copeland (born December 15, 1987) is an American former professional baseball pitcher. He played in Major League Baseball (MLB) for the Toronto Blue Jays and New York Mets and in the KBO League for the LG Twins.

== Professional career ==
Copeland attended White Oak High School in White Oak, Texas.

=== Baltimore Orioles ===
Copeland then attended the University of Southern Mississippi, and was drafted by the Baltimore Orioles in the 21st round, with the 628th overall selection, of the 2010 Major League Baseball draft. Copeland played the 2010 season with the Low–A Aberdeen IronBirds and Single–A Delmarva Shorebirds, and totaled a 3–5 win–loss record, 2.66 earned run average (ERA), and 53 strikeouts in 71 innings pitched. Copeland began the 2011 season in Delmarva, and later earned a promotion to the High–A Frederick Keys. In 141 2/3 innings pitched, he posted an 8–11 record, 5.53 ERA, and 77 strikeouts. Copeland made 18 starts with the Keys in 2012, posting a 3–8 record with a 6.88 ERA before being released by Baltimore on July 19, 2012.

=== Toronto Blue Jays ===
On July 24, 2012, Copeland signed a minor league contract with the Toronto Blue Jays organization. He spent the remainder of the year with the High–A Dunedin Blue Jays for the rest of the season. In 36 2/3 innings with Dunedin, Copeland posted a 4–1 record, 2.70 ERA, and 32 strikeouts.

Copeland opened the 2014 season with the Double–A New Hampshire Fisher Cats, and earned a late promotion to the Triple–A Buffalo Bisons. In total, he pitched to an 11–9 record, 3.45 ERA, and 105 strikeouts in 164 1/3 innings. In the offseason he played for the Estrellas de Oriente of the Dominican Winter League, posting a 2–0 record and a 1.23 ERA in 29 1/3 innings. Copeland opened the 2015 season in Triple–A, and earned a 2–1 record with a 1.44 ERA through his first 4 starts.

Following a Blue Jays loss on May 1, 2015, Copeland was promoted to the major leagues for the first time, replacing Andrew Albers on the roster. He made his debut on May 2, pitching 1 scoreless inning in an 11–4 win against the Cleveland Indians. Copeland was optioned back to Triple–A Buffalo the following day, recalled on May 18, and returned to Buffalo on May 29. He was recalled by Toronto again on June 2 to be the 26th man for the second game of a doubleheader against the Washington Nationals, and was returned to Buffalo the next day. Copeland was recalled once again on June 10, to make his first major league start in place of Aaron Sanchez. He earned his first win as the Blue Jays beat the Miami Marlins 7–2. Copeland pitched 7 innings and yielded 7 hits and 1 earned run, while striking out 4. He was optioned back to Buffalo after the game. He was recalled on June 16, after Sanchez was placed on the disabled list, and made 2 additional starts for the Blue Jays before returning to Buffalo. He was designated for assignment on September 13, and outrighted to Buffalo on September 16. Copeland finished his first Major League season with a 1–1 record, 6.46 ERA, and 6 strikeouts in 15 1/3 innings pitched.

Copeland elected free agency on November 6, 2015, but was re-signed to a minor league contract by the Blue Jays on December 18, that included an invitation to spring training. Copeland was reassigned to minor league camp on March 12.

=== LG Twins ===
On April 9, 2016, Copeland's contract was sold to the LG Twins of the KBO League for an undisclosed transfer fee. The Twins then signed him to a one-year, $750,000 contract. After 13 starts, he was waived and released on July 8, and replaced on the Twins' roster by another former major league pitcher, David Huff.

=== Toronto Blue Jays (second stint) ===
On July 24, 2016, Copeland signed a minor league contract to return the Toronto Blue Jays, and was assigned to the Triple–A Buffalo Bisons. He made nine starts for the Bisons, going 3–4 with a 3.04 ERA and 33 strikeouts in 50 1/3 innings. Copeland elected free agency following the season on November 7.

=== Miami Marlins ===
During the 2016 offseason, Copeland signed a minor league contract with the Miami Marlins. On April 14, 2017, while pitching for the Triple-A New Orleans Baby Cakes, Copeland pitched the first 7 innings of a combined no-hitter against the Iowa Cubs, with Hunter Cervenka pitching the 8th inning, and Brandon Cunniff pitching a perfect ninth. In 26 starts for New Orleans, he posted a 9–11 record and 4.97 ERA with 118 strikeouts in 137 2/3 innings pitched. He elected free agency following the season on November 6.

=== New York Mets ===
On March 30, 2018, Copeland signed with the Somerset Patriots of the independent Atlantic League of Professional Baseball. However, he did not appear for Somerset, and signed a minor league contract with the New York Mets organization April 17. Copeland was called up by the Mets on May 30, and designated for assignment on June 1. He cleared waivers and was sent outright to the Double–A Binghamton Rumble Ponies on June 3. Copeland elected free agency on October 2.

=== Washington Nationals ===
On December 30, 2018, Copeland signed a minor league contract with the Washington Nationals. He became a free agent following the 2019 season.
