= Ian Thomas (baseball) =

American baseball player (born 1987)

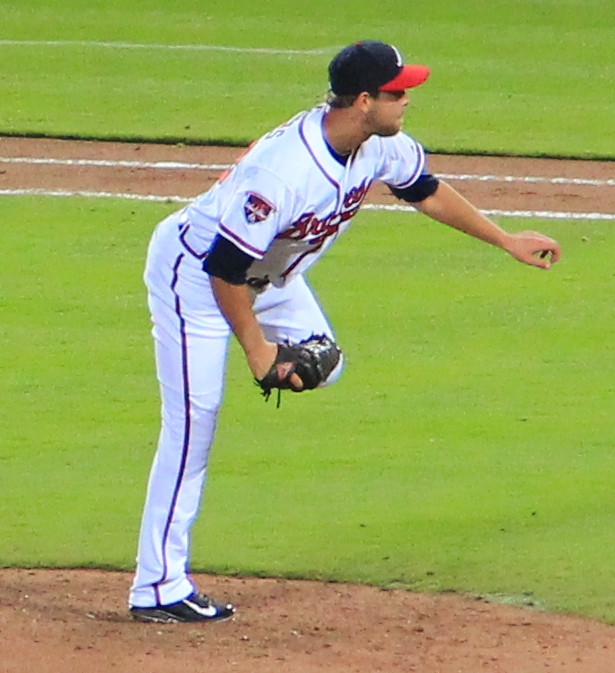
- Thomas with the Atlanta Braves
- Pitcher
- Born: April 20, 1987 (age 38); Norfolk, Virginia, U.S.
- Batted: Right Threw: Left

MLB debut
- March 31, 2014, for the Atlanta Braves

Last MLB appearance
- September 27, 2015, for the Los Angeles Dodgers

MLB statistics
- Win–loss record: 2–3
- Earned run average: 3.97
- Strikeouts: 36
- Stats at Baseball Reference

Teams
- Atlanta Braves (2014–2015); Los Angeles Dodgers (2015)

Ian Drew Thomas (born April 20, 1987) is an American former professional baseball pitcher. He played in Major League Baseball (MLB) for the Atlanta Braves and Los Angeles Dodgers.

== Career ==
=== Amateur and independent leagues ===
Thomas is a graduate of Kellam High School. He played college baseball at Louisburg College and Virginia Commonwealth University. After going undrafted in the 2009 Major League Baseball draft, he signed with the Winnipeg Goldeyes of the Northern League. In 2010, he was the Northern League Rookie Pitcher of the Year, after going 5–1 with a 1.64 earned run average (ERA). After three years with Winnipeg, he signed with the York Revolution of the Atlantic League of Professional Baseball in 2012.

=== Atlanta Braves ===
In May 2012, he signed a minor league deal with the Atlanta Braves. He appeared in 26 games, going 5–0 with a 3.15 ERA and 58 strikeouts over 45 innings. In 2013, he pitched for the Mississippi Braves. He started 13 of 39 total games, finishing with a 2.76 ERA and 123 strikeouts over 104 1/3 innings. Thomas was a nonroster invitee to 2014 Spring training with the Braves where he pitched 10.1 innings in 11 Spring training games for a 1–0 record, 2.61 ERA, 13 strikeouts, and a 1.16 WHIP. He was not expected to make the parent club, anticipating AAA Gwinnett as his 2014 team. However, due to a rash of injuries to Braves' pitchers and an impressive Spring training run, Thomas was one of the final two players (along with fellow left-handed reliever Ryan Buchter) named to the Atlanta Braves' Opening Day roster. He was filling a relief role with the club.

On May 4, 2014, Thomas was optioned to Triple-A Gwinnett to make room for Gavin Floyd, who was activated off the disabled list. He was moved to the starting rotation in Gwinnett where he made one start, not allowing any runs in three innings and striking out five. The Braves tasked the lefty with developing a slider to add to his arsenal, strengthening his value to the Braves when they need him again. On May 10, 2014, he was recalled to Atlanta to replace Jordan Walden, who was placed on the 15-day DL for a pulled hamstring. He was expected to remain with Atlanta until May 20. He was optioned back to Gwinnett on May 31. Thomas was invited to spring training in 2015, and reassigned to Gwinnett on March 9. Thomas was recalled on April 21, a day after Andrew McKirahan was suspended for eighty games.

=== Los Angeles Dodgers ===
On May 27, 2015, he was traded to the Los Angeles Dodgers (with Alberto Callaspo, Eric Stults and Juan Jaime) in exchange for Juan Uribe and Chris Withrow. The Dodgers assigned him to the AAA Oklahoma City Dodgers. He was recalled by the Dodgers on June 2 to serve as the designated "26th man" for a doubleheader that day. He allowed four runs on five hits in three innings of work and was credited with the loss. He returned to the team in September and appeared in nine total games for the Dodgers, with a 4.00 ERA. In 14 games, with six starts, for Oklahoma City, he was 4–1 with a 5.74 ERA. Thomas appeared in eight games for Oklahoma City in 2016, with two starts. He was 2–0 with a 1.42 ERA However, he was shut down with a shoulder injury and spent much of the season on the disabled list. He was designated for assignment by the Dodgers on June 30, 2016, to make room for newly acquired pitcher, Bud Norris and released a few days later, on July 3.

=== Later career ===
On April 25, 2019, after several years out of professional baseball due to injuries, Thomas signed with the York Revolution of the Atlantic League of Professional Baseball. He was released on July 28. In 21 games (10 starts) he threw 49 innings going 3-2 with a 4.96 ERA and 48 strikeouts.
