= Joey Terdoslavich =

American baseball player (born 1988)

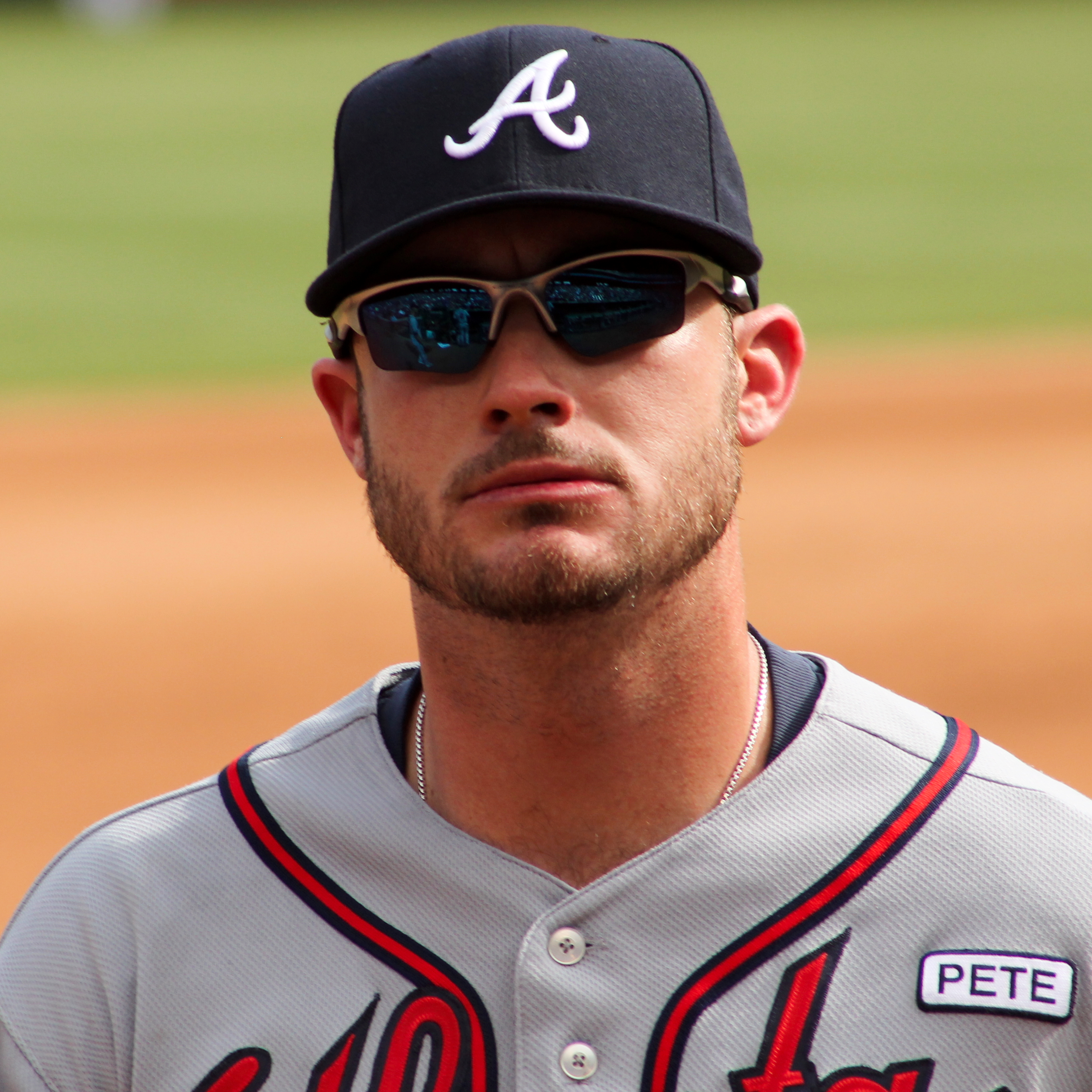
- Terdoslavich with the Atlanta Braves in 2014
- First baseman / Outfielder
- Born: September 9, 1988 (age 37); Sarasota, Florida, U.S.
- Batted: Switch Threw: Right

MLB debut
- July 4, 2013, for the Atlanta Braves

Last MLB appearance
- August 18, 2015, for the Atlanta Braves

MLB statistics
- Batting average: .221
- Home runs: 1
- Runs batted in: 10
- Stats at Baseball Reference

Teams
- Atlanta Braves (2013–2015)

Joseph Thomas Terdoslavich (born September 9, 1988) is an American former professional baseball left fielder and first baseman. He has previously played in Major League Baseball (MLB) for the Atlanta Braves.

== Early life ==
Of Croat descent, Joseph Thomas Terdoslavich was born in Sarasota, Florida on September 9, 1988. He and his brother Tyler were raised in a single-parent household by Joe Terdoslavich Sr. When Joey learned to walk at eight months old, his father began teaching him how to hit. Terdoslavich started using a Wiffle ball bat and tee at ten months of age and first threw a baseball at three years of age. He attended Sarasota High School in his hometown and was teammates with Eric Erickson and Mark Sobolewski. Terdoslavich's high school teams were coached by Clyde Metcalf. As a junior in 2006, Terdoslavich hit .411 with three homers, 29 RBI and set a school record with 23 doubles. That year Sarasota lost the state championship to Charles W. Flanagan High School. After the season, he was named to the second All-State team. In his senior season, Terdoslavich won a state title and hit .411 with five homers, leading his team with 32 RBI. His 2007 performance netted him a second team Louisville Slugger All-American award. Baseball America ranked him the 87th best prospect of the year, and he was drafted in the 35th round of the 2007 MLB draft by the Tampa Bay Devil Rays. Terdoslavich did not sign, choosing instead to attend the University of Miami where high school teammates Erickson and Sobolewski were playing baseball, after visits to Florida and Central Florida. In his lone freshman season with the Miami Hurricanes baseball team, Terdoslavich roomed with D.J. Swatscheno, who had pitched for the 2006 Flanagan High baseball team.

He later transferred to California State University, Long Beach, where he played for the Long Beach State Dirtbags baseball team. In 2009, he played collegiate summer baseball with the Chatham Anglers of the Cape Cod Baseball League.

== Professional career ==
=== Atlanta Braves ===
Terdoslavich was drafted by the Atlanta Braves in the sixth round of the 2010 MLB draft and signed with the Braves for $125,000. He made his professional debut with the Danville Braves and also played for the Single-A Rome Braves, hitting .302 in 70 games. Terdoslavich had a successful season in 2011 for the High-A Lynchburg Hillcats in the Braves minor league system (he hit a Carolina League record 52 doubles) and was sent to the Surprise Saguaros of the Arizona Fall League, making the Fall League All Star team. He started the 2012 season playing with the Triple-A Gwinnett Braves, making the jump from Single–A to Triple–A. He split the 2012 season between Gwinnett and the Double-A Mississippi Braves.

Terdoslavich began playing the outfield in 2013 and started the season at Triple-A Gwinnett. He was named to the All-Star Futures Game, but did not appear in the contest, as he had been called up to the Atlanta Braves on July 4, 2013.

The Braves promoted Terdoslavich to the major leagues for the first time on July 4, 2013, to replace the injured Jordan Schafer. Terdoslavich recorded a hit in his second major league at-bat, a pinch-hit single off of Jonathan Papelbon. He spent the rest of the year with Atlanta used mostly as a pinch-hitter. In 55 games (14 starts), Terdoslavich hit .215 with 4 RBI, 4 doubles and 12 walks. Terdoslavich played with the Toros del Este in the offseason, hitting .291 with 2 HR and a .762 OPS. In 85 games with Gwinnett, Terdoslavich hit .318 with 18 HR, 58 RBI, and a .926 OPS. He was named an International League Postseason All-Star, as well as Gwinnett's MVP.

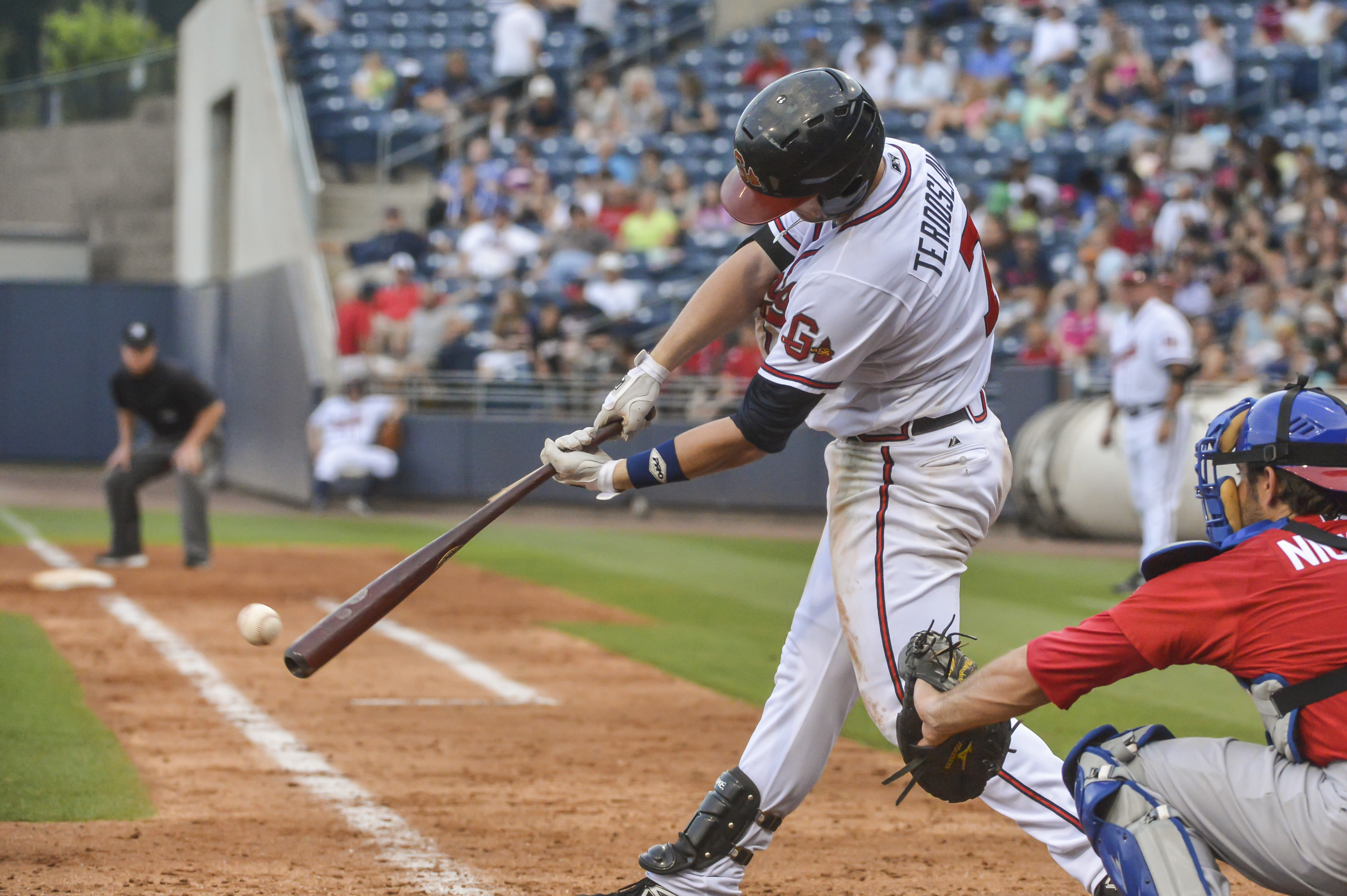
Terdoslavich with the Gwinnett Braves, 2013

Terdoslavich began 2014 with Gwinnett for the third consecutive season. He was named the International League Batter of the Week for August 18 to 24. He was promoted to the major league team on September 1, 2014. He started the 2015 season with Gwinnett, then was reinstated in June 2015 to replace Eric Young Jr., who was designated for assignment. He hit his first major league home run on June 9, 2015, off of San Diego Padres' relief pitcher, Joaquín Benoit in the Braves' 6-5 win. He was sent back to Gwinnett on the following day, when Kelly Johnson was activated from the DL. He was recalled to the Braves on June 23, when Freddie Freeman was placed on the 15-day DL. Terdslavich was optioned back to Gwinnett on July 7, 2015, in order to make room on the roster for Mike Foltynewicz, who was called up for the purpose of providing extra relief help in Atlanta's bullpen. Terdoslavich was called up again on July 17, 2015, after closer Jason Grilli suffered a season-ending injury. On July 25, 2015, the Braves made a series of roster moves following the trade of Johnson and Juan Uribe to the New York Mets on the previous day. Freeman was activated from the disabled list and infielders Daniel Castro and Adonis García were called up from Gwinnett. Terdoslavich was sent down to Gwinnett in order to clear the extra roster spot. He was recalled to Atlanta on August 4, 2015, when Freeman was again placed on the DL. When Freeman returned from the disabled list on August 19, Terdoslavich was sent down to Gwinnett, where he spent the rest of the minor league 2015 season. Terdoslavich was not among the players who were called up for roster expansions in September 2015.

On January 8, 2016, the Braves placed Terdoslavich on waivers to make room on the 40-man roster for Kelly Johnson, who had re-signed with the Braves.

=== Baltimore Orioles ===
Terdoslavich was claimed off waivers by the Baltimore Orioles on the same day he was cut by the Braves. The Orioles designated Terdoslavich for assignment on January 21, 2016, in order to make room on the roster for Chris Davis, who had re-signed with the team. On January 28, 2016, the Orioles outrighted Terdoslavich to their Triple A affiliate, the Norfolk Tides. Terdoslavich hit for a .140 batting average in his time with the Tides, and was demoted to the Double A Bowie Baysox in April 2016 after prospect Trey Mancini was promoted. While playing in the Eastern League, Terdoslavich improved significantly, battling .246 with 14 home runs and 62 RBI. He became a free agent after the season on November 7.

=== Pittsburgh Pirates ===
On January 18, 2017, Terdoslavich signed a minor league contract with the Pittsburgh Pirates that included an invitation to spring training. He spent the year with the Triple-A Indianapolis Indians, slashing .277/.356/.402 with 7 home runs and 47 RBI. He elected free agency on November 6, 2017.

=== Lancaster Barnstormers ===
On April 16, 2018, Terdoslavich signed with the Lancaster Barnstormers of the Atlantic League of Professional Baseball. In 40 games with Lancaster, Terdoslavich batted .275/.346/.442 with 6 home runs and 28 RBI.

=== New York Mets ===
On June 14, 2018, Terdoslavich signed a minor league contract with the New York Mets organization. He spent the remainder of the year with the Double-A Binghamton Mets, posting a .308/.368/.472 slash line in 74 games. Terdoslavich elected free agency following the season on November 2.

=== Lancaster Barnstormers (second stint) ===
On March 6, 2019, Terdoslavich re-signed with the Lancaster Barnstormers. In the season, he played in 125 games for the Barnstormers, logging a .294/.365/.478 slash line with 22 home runs and 75 RBI. Terdoslavich became a free agent following the season.

=== New York Mets (second stint) ===
On February 21, 2020, Terdoslavich signed a minor league contract to return to the New York Mets. In March, the remainder of spring training and the regular season was shut down until further notice as a result of the COVID-19 pandemic. Roster transactions were also temporarily frozen until the week of May 29. Terdoslavich was among several players released by the Mets organization at this time.

=== Chicago Dogs ===
On June 18, 2020, Terdoslavich signed with the Chicago Dogs of the American Association. Terdoslavich hit .296 with 15 home runs and 46 RBI in 58 games for the Dogs.

=== Sultanes de Monterrey ===
On May 12, 2021, Terdoslavich's contract was purchased by the Sultanes de Monterrey of the Mexican League. In 16 games for Monterrey, Terdoslavich batted .281/.438/.509 with 4 home runs and 14 RBI.

=== Bravos de León ===
On June 11, 2021, Terdoslavich was traded to the Bravos de León of the Mexican League. In 39 games, he batted .306/.410/.537 with 8 home runs and 29 RBIs.

=== Chicago Dogs (second stint) ===
On August 26, 2021, Terdoslavich was loaned to the Chicago Dogs of the American Association of Professional Baseball. In 11 games he hit .277/.359/.532 with 2 home runs and 7 RBIs.

=== Bravos de León (second stint) ===
On October 1, 2021, Terdoslavich's contract was returned to the Bravos de León. In 90 games, he slashed .329/.424/.609 with 21 home runs and 76 RBIs. He re-signed for the 2023 season. In 21 games, Terdoslavich batted .247/.351/.395 with 2 home runs and 12 RBIs.

=== Tigres de Quintana Roo ===
On May 16, 2023, Terdoslavich had his rights traded to the Tigres de Quintana Roo of the Mexican League. In 30 games, he batted .223/.296/.366 with 3 home runs and 20 RBIs. Terdoslavich was waived by the Tigres on June 26.

=== Ottawa Titans ===
On July 28, 2023, Terdoslavich signed with the Ottawa Titans of the Frontier League. In 33 games for Ottawa, he batted .265/.356/.368 with 2 home runs and 16 RBI. Following the season on November 7, Terdoslavich was released by the Titans.

== Personal ==
Terdoslavich is the nephew of former All-Star outfielder Mike Greenwell.
