= Eury Pérez (outfielder) =

Dominican baseball player (born 1990)

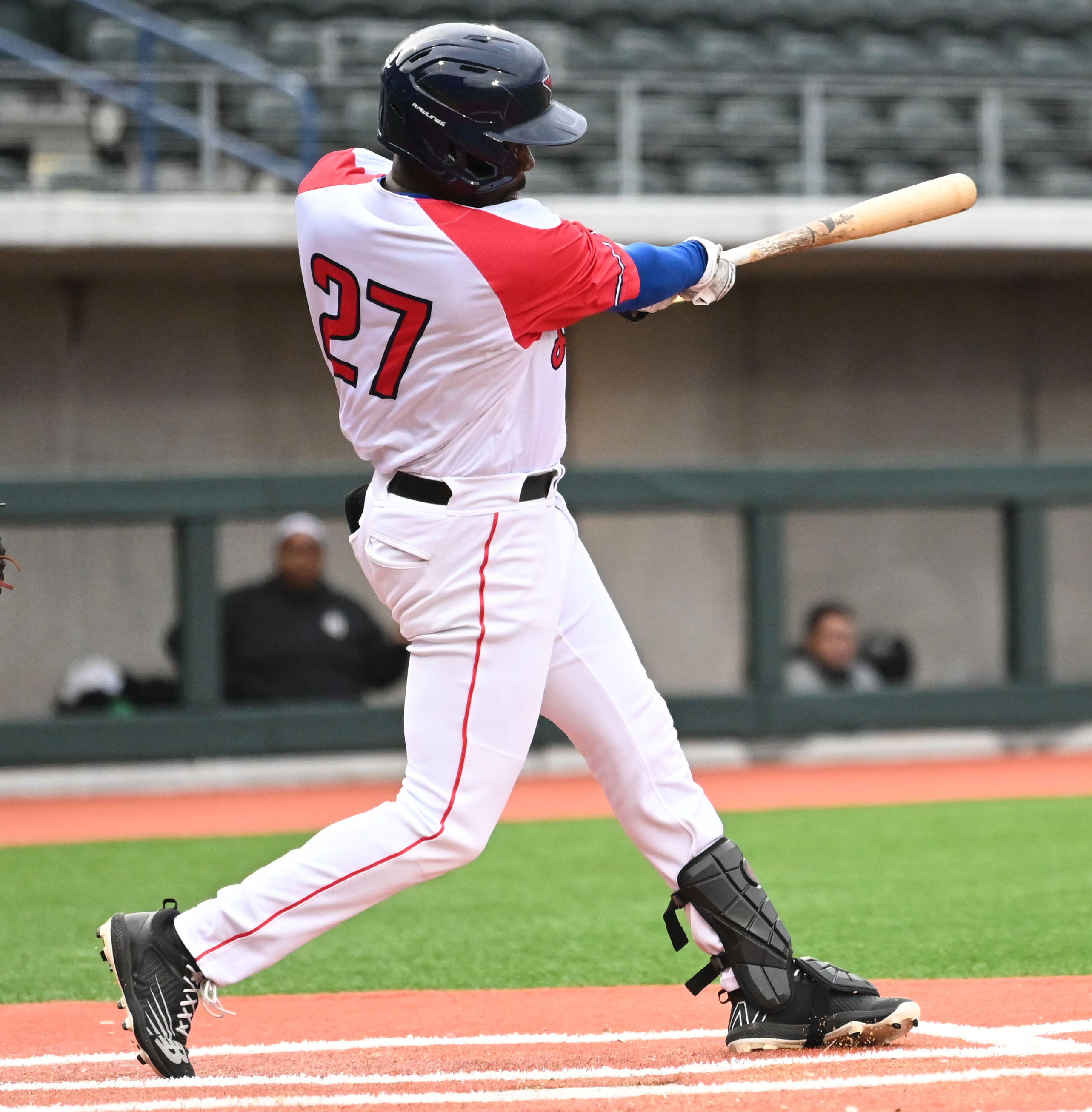
- Pérez with the Hagerstown Flying Boxcars in 2024

Free agent
- Outfielder
- Born: May 30, 1990 (age 35); San Luis, Dominican Republic
- Bats: Right Throws: Right

MLB debut
- September 1, 2012, for the Washington Nationals

MLB statistics (through 2015 season)
- Batting average: .254
- Home runs: 0
- Runs batted in: 5
- Stats at Baseball Reference

Teams
- Washington Nationals (2012–2013); New York Yankees (2014); Atlanta Braves (2015)
Medals
Men's baseball
Representing Dominican Republic
World Baseball Classic
Gold medal – first place	2013 San Francisco	Team

Eury Eduardo Pérez (born May 30, 1990) is a Dominican professional baseball outfielder who is a free agent. He has previously played in Major League Baseball (MLB) for the Washington Nationals, New York Yankees, and Atlanta Braves.

== Professional career ==
=== Washington Nationals ===
Pérez participated in the 2010 All-Star Futures Game. After the 2011 season, the Nationals added Pérez to their 40-man roster to protect him from the Rule 5 draft. Pérez was regarded as a speedy outfielder with limited power and emerging hitting ability. In 2012, he broke out with the bat across multiple minor league levels, batting .314. Pérez's speed was also well discussed, as he stole 64 bases for the Hagerstown Suns in 2010 and 54 in 2012 for the rookie-level Gulf Coast League Nationals, Harrisburg, the Triple-A Syracuse Chiefs, and Washington. Pérez made 13 appearances for Washington during his rookie campaign, going 1-for-5 (.200) with three stolen bases.

Pérez was brought up by the Nationals from the Triple-A Syracuse Chiefs on May 11, 2013, when Jayson Werth was placed on the disabled list. He played in nine games for the team during the regular season, going 1-for-8 (.125) with one stolen base.

Perez did not appear for Washington in 2014, instead batting .310/.371/.409 with two home runs, 15 RBI, and 26 stolen bases across 67 appearances for the GCL Nationals, High-A Potomac Nationals, and Syracuse. On September 18, 2014, Pérez was designated for assignment by the Nationals.

=== New York Yankees ===
On September 22, 2014, Pérez was claimed off waivers by the New York Yankees. He made four appearances for the Yankees, going 2-for-10 (.200) with one stolen base. On January 16, 2015, the Yankees designated Pérez for assignment.

=== Atlanta Braves ===
On January 23, 2015, the Atlanta Braves claimed Pérez off waivers from the Yankees. He was invited to spring training, and optioned to the Triple–A Gwinnett Braves on March 27. Pérez was recalled to the major league club on June 18. In 47 games for the Braves, he slashed .269/.331/.303 with five RBI and three stolen bases. On December 2, Pérez was non–tendered by the Braves and became a free agent.

=== Houston Astros ===
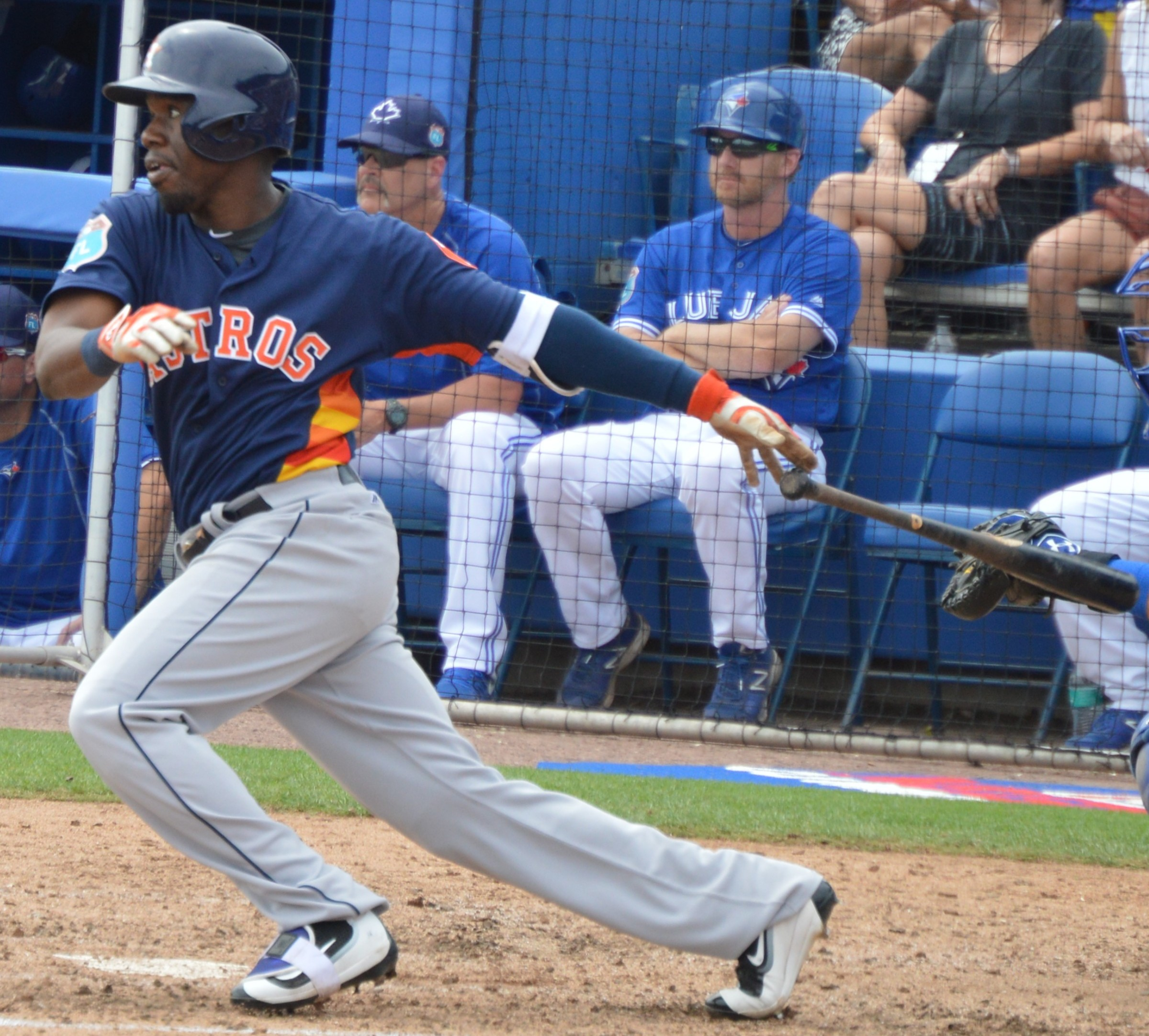
Pérez with the Houston Astros in 2016

Pérez signed a minor league deal with the Houston Astros organization on January 1, 2016. In 52 games for the Triple–A Fresno Grizzlies, Pérez batted .267/.298/.385 with two home runs, 16 RBI, and nine stolen bases.

=== Tampa Bay Rays ===
On June 23, 2016, Pérez was traded to the Tampa Bay Rays and assigned to their Triple–A affiliate, the Durham Bulls. In 27 games for Durham, he hit .239/.295/.307 with four RBI and 11 stolen bases. Pérez elected free agency following the season on November 7.

=== Pittsburgh Pirates ===
On December 16, 2016, Pérez signed a minor league contract with the Pittsburgh Pirates that included an invitation to spring training. While playing for Pittsburgh's Triple–A affiliate, the Indianapolis Indians in 2017, Perez batted .336/.400/.433, with 22 steals in 50 games before being traded.

=== Miami Marlins ===
On August 3, 2017, Pérez was traded to the Miami Marlins. Upon being acquired by the Marlins, Perez was assigned to their Triple–A club, the New Orleans Baby Cakes. In 27 games for New Orleans, he hit .375/.411/.481 with no home runs, 12 RBI, and 9 stolen bases. Pérez elected free agency following the season on November 6.

=== San Francisco Giants ===
On February 23, 2018, Pérez signed a minor league contract with the San Francisco Giants organization. In 52 games for the Triple–A Sacramento River Cats, he hit .264/.301/.361 with one home run, 20 RBI, and 18 stolen bases. Pérez became a free agent following the season on November 2.

=== Guerreros de Oaxaca ===
On March 1, 2019, Pérez signed with the Guerreros de Oaxaca of the Mexican League. Pérez appeared in three games and slashed .400/.455/.900 with one home run and two RBI before being released on April 13.

=== Olmecas de Tabasco ===
On April 15, 2019, Perez signed with the Olmecas de Tabasco of the Mexican League. He was released on May 25 after appearing in 28 games and hitting .353/.409/.431 with no home runs and 13 RBI.

=== Sioux City Explorers ===
On December 9, 2020, Pérez signed with the Sioux City Explorers of the American Association of Professional Baseball. On July 10, 2021, Pérez was released by Sioux City without having appeared in a game for the team.

=== Wild Health Genomes ===
On August 16, 2022, Pérez signed with the Wild Health Genomes of the Atlantic League of Professional Baseball. He appeared in 17 games, slashing .400/.446/.553 with no home runs and six RBI.

=== Sioux City Explorers ===
On February 23, 2023, Pérez signed with the Sioux City Explorers of the American Association of Professional Baseball. In 17 games for Sioux City, he hit .247/.267/.370 with 2 home runs and 11 RBI. Pérez was released by the Explorers on June 5.

=== Hagerstown Flying Boxcars ===
On February 22, 2024, it was announced that Pérez would be signing with the Hagerstown Flying Boxcars for their inaugural season of play in the Atlantic League of Professional Baseball. In 41 games for Hagerstown, he slashed .292/.328/.360 with one home run, 18 RBI, and 19 stolen bases. Pérez became a free agent following the season.

=== Lake Country DockHounds ===
On June 17, 2025, Pérez signed with the Lake Country DockHounds of the American Association of Professional Baseball. In 10 appearances for the DockHounds, he batted .219/.265/.344 with one home run, two RBI, and one stolen base. Pérez was released by Lake Country on July 15.
