= Matt Marksberry =

American baseball player (born 1990)

- Pitcher
- Born: August 25, 1990 (age 35); Cincinnati, Ohio, U.S.
- Batted: Left Threw: Left

MLB debut
- July 31, 2015, for the Atlanta Braves

Last MLB appearance
- July 30, 2016, for the Atlanta Braves

MLB statistics
- Win–loss record: 0–3
- Earned run average: 5.06
- Strikeouts: 23
- Stats at Baseball Reference

Teams
- Atlanta Braves (2015–2016)

Matthew Gates Marksberry (born August 25, 1990) is an American former professional baseball pitcher. He played in Major League Baseball (MLB) for the Atlanta Braves in 2015 and 2016.

== Early life ==
Marksberry was born in Cincinnati, Ohio, on August 25, 1990, to father Bob and mother Sandra. He attended Glen Este High School.

== Career ==
=== Atlanta Braves ===
Marksberry played college baseball at Campbell University. He was drafted by the Atlanta Braves in the 15th round of the 2013 Major League Baseball draft.

He started the 2015 season with the Single-A Carolina Mudcats and was later promoted to the Triple-A Gwinnett Braves, without having played at the Double-A level. After eleven games with Gwinnett, Marksberry was called up to the majors for the first time on July 30, 2015, and made his MLB debut the next day, pitching 1 1/3 innings.

Marksberry was invited to spring training in 2016, but did not make Opening Day roster. He was sent to the Double-A Mississippi Braves to start the season, and recalled on April 23. He made an appearance against the New York Mets, then was optioned to Gwinnett after the game. Marksberry was next recalled on June 25, and spent four days in the major leagues. On July 28, Marksberry was recalled for the third time during the 2016 season. He was placed on the 15-day disabled list on July 31, and moved to the 60-day disabled list in September, ending his season. Marksberry was released in March 2017.

=== Québec Capitales ===
On August 2, 2017, Marksberry signed with the Somerset Patriots of the Atlantic League. He was released on August 6, without appearing in a game.

On August 17, 2017, Marksberry signed with the Québec Capitales of the Can-Am League. In six appearances for Québec, Marksberry logged a 1–1 record and 4.15 ERA with eight strikeouts across 4 1/3 innings pitched.

=== Lancaster Barnstormers ===
On February 7, 2018, Marksberry was traded from to the Lancaster Barnstormers of the Atlantic League of Professional Baseball. In 45 appearances for Lancaster, he posted a 2–2 record and 1.82 ERA with 47 strikeouts across 39 2/3 innings of relief. Marksberry became a free agent following the season.

On January 4, 2019, Marksberry signed a minor league contract with the Arizona Diamondbacks that included an invitation to spring training. He was released prior to the start of the season on March 14.

On March 20, 2019, Marksberry re-signed with the Lancaster. In 54 appearances for the Barnstormers, he registered a 4–4 record and 5.69 ERA with 64 strikeouts and one save across 55 1/3 innings pitched. Marksberry became a free agent following the season.

=== Sydney Blue Sox ===
Marksberry signed with the Sydney Blue Sox of the Australian Baseball League for the 2019/20 season.

On March 5, 2020, Marksberry signed with the Sioux City Explorers of the American Association of Independent Professional Baseball. However, the team was not selected by the league to compete in the condensed 2020 season due to the COVID-19 pandemic. Marksberry was not chosen by another team in the dispersal draft, and therefore became a free agent.

== Personal life ==
After the 2016 season, Marksberry reported having stomach pains. He underwent a colonoscopy, had a seizure, and suffered a collapsed lung during the procedure. He was placed in a medically induced coma.
