= John Cornely =

American baseball player (born 1989)

- Pitcher
- Born: May 17, 1989 (age 36); Mount Pleasant, South Carolina
- Batted: Right Threw: Right

MLB debut
- April 29, 2015, for the Atlanta Braves

Last appearance
- April 29, 2015, for the Atlanta Braves

MLB statistics
- Win–loss record: 0–0
- Earned run average: 36.00
- Strikeouts: 1
- Stats at Baseball Reference

Teams
- Atlanta Braves (2015)

John Francis Cornely (born May 17, 1989) is an American former professional baseball pitcher. He has played in Major League Baseball (MLB) for the Atlanta Braves.

== Career ==
=== Atlanta Braves ===
Cornely was drafted by the Atlanta Braves in the 15th round of the 2011 Major League Baseball draft out of Wofford College.

Cornely was called up to the majors for the first time on April 24, 2015. He was designated for assignment on May 19.

=== Boston Red Sox ===
On May 20, 2015, Cornely was traded to the Boston Red Sox. He was released by the Red Sox on March 28, 2016. Cornely retired in 2016.
