= Eric Young Jr. =

American baseball player and coach (born 1985)

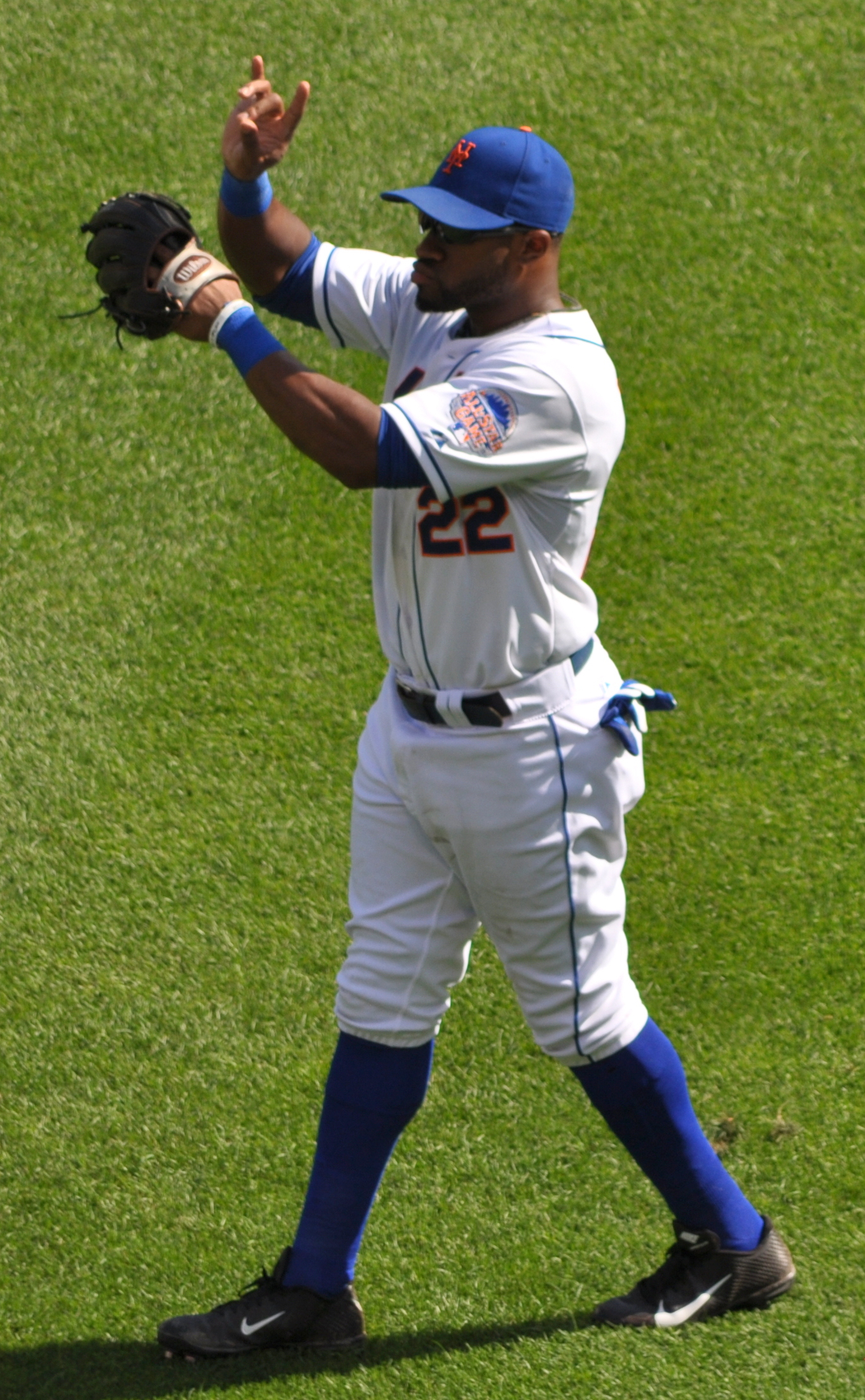
- Young with the New York Mets in 2013
- Outfielder / Coach
- Born: May 25, 1985 (age 41); New Brunswick, New Jersey, U.S.
- Batted: Switch Threw: Right

MLB debut
- August 25, 2009, for the Colorado Rockies

Last MLB appearance
- September 30, 2018, for the Los Angeles Angels

MLB statistics
- Batting average: .245
- Home runs: 13
- Runs batted in: 112
- Stolen bases: 162
- Stats at Baseball Reference

Teams
- As player: Colorado Rockies (2009–2013); New York Mets (2013–2014); Atlanta Braves (2015); New York Mets (2015); New York Yankees (2016); Los Angeles Angels (2017–2018); As coach: Washington Nationals (2022–2023); Seattle Mariners (2025–2026)

Career highlights and awards
- NL stolen base leader (2013)

Eric Orlando Young Jr. (born May 25, 1985) is an American professional baseball former outfielder and first base coach. He played in Major League Baseball (MLB) for the Colorado Rockies, New York Mets, Atlanta Braves, New York Yankees, and Los Angeles Angels from 2009 to 2018. He led the National League in stolen bases in 2013.

Young was born in New Brunswick, New Jersey and graduated from Piscataway Township High School in Piscataway, New Jersey. He had a football scholarship to attend Villanova University. The Colorado Rockies selected Young in the 30th round of the 2003 Major League Baseball draft, and he signed rather than attend college.

== Baseball career ==
Young began his professional career playing in 2004 for the Casper Rockies, an advanced rookie Pioneer League team in Casper, Wyoming. In 2006, Young led all minor leaguers with 87 in stolen bases. He then won the Arizona Fall League batting title, finishing with a .430 average. Young appeared in the 2009 All-Star Futures Game, hitting a three-run home run.

=== Colorado Rockies ===
Young made his major league debut on August 25, 2009, for the Colorado Rockies playing center field. He had his first career hit in this game during the 5th inning and ended the game 1–4. His father, Eric Young Sr., was in attendance for his debut. On September 8, Young hit his first career home run in the bottom of the 6th inning against the Cincinnati Reds. He came off the bench in the only two postseason appearances of his career, batting 0-for-1 in the National League Division Series.

During spring training in 2010, Young was optioned to the team's Triple-A affiliate, the Colorado Springs Sky Sox. On April 25, he was recalled to the Rockies. On May 15, he suffered a stress fracture in his right tibia and was placed on the 60-day disabled list. He would return from the DL to Coors Field on August 14. On May 27, 2011, he was called back up to the Rockies with an above .300 batting average with the Sky Sox. He was on the Rockies' 2012 opening day roster. He went on the disabled list with a left intercostal muscle strain on August 20. Young was designated for assignment by the Rockies on June 12, 2013.

=== New York Mets ===
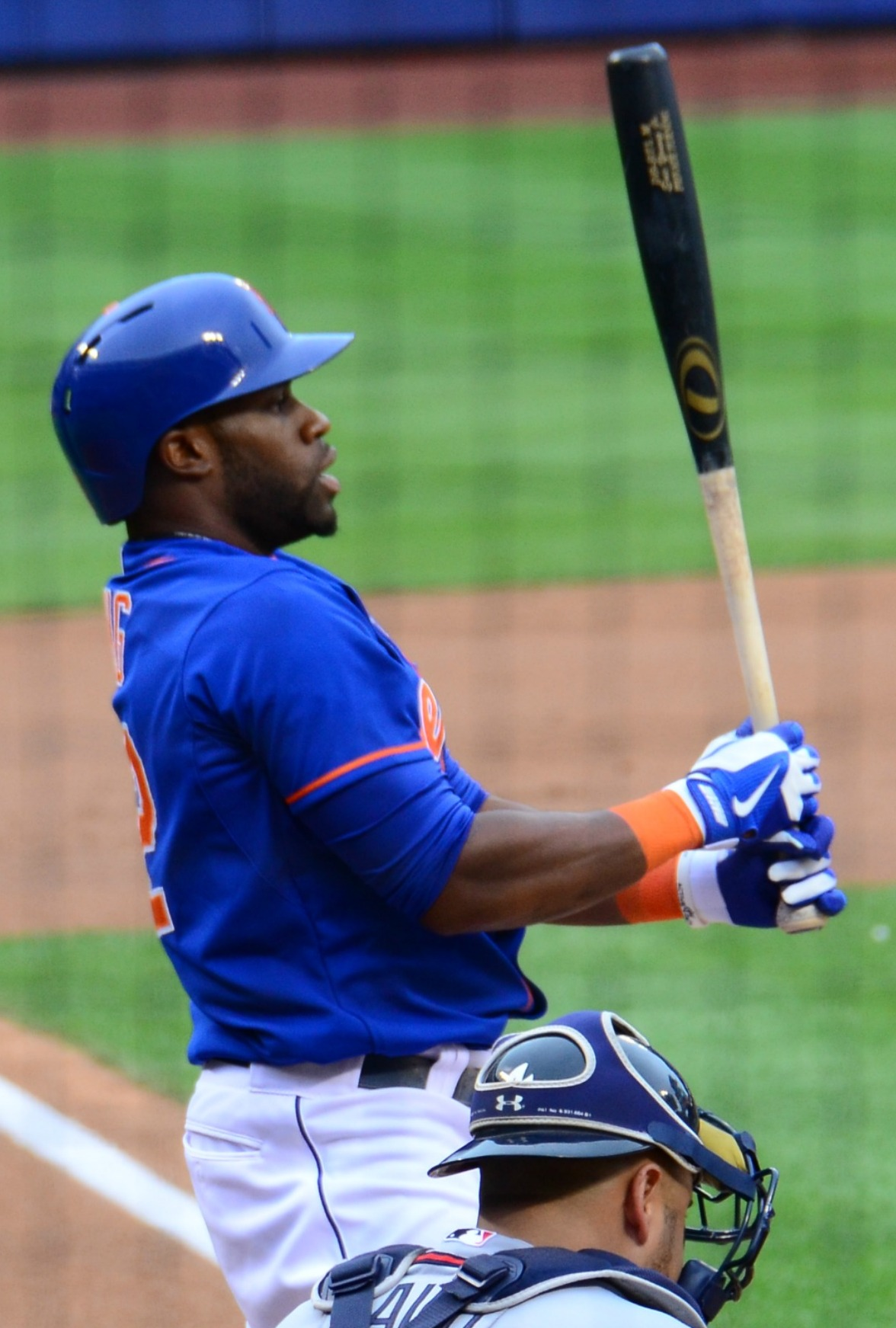
Young with the Mets in 2013

On June 18, 2013, Young was traded to the New York Mets for pitcher Collin McHugh. On July 24, Young was involved in a season-ending incident for pitcher Tim Hudson. Hudson was covering the first base bag, and Young attempted to beat the groundout. When Young stepped late on the bag, his cleat dug hard into Hudson's ankle full stride, unnaturally rolling it. This incident broke Hudson's ankle and ultimately ended Hudson's last season with the Braves. Young expressed extreme concern for Hudson after the play ended. On August 2, Young hit the first walk-off hit of his career, a two-run home run, in the 11th inning against the Kansas City Royals.

On September 29, 2013 in the final game of the season, Young stole his 45th and 46th bases against the Milwaukee Brewers, becoming the National League stolen base leader. He is the Mets' first stolen bases champion since José Reyes in 2007. On December 2, 2014, Young was non-tendered by the Mets.

=== Atlanta Braves ===
Young signed a minor league contract with the Atlanta Braves on February 13, 2015. The deal included an invitation to spring training. On June 5, the Braves designated Young for assignment. With Atlanta, he batted .169/.229/.273.

=== New York Mets (second stint) ===
On August 22, 2015, Young was traded back to the Mets in exchange for cash. He was removed from the 40-man roster on November 5, making him a free agent. Young had a batting average of .153 with no home runs, five RBIs and .217 on-base percentage with both the Braves and the Mets in 2015.

=== Milwaukee Brewers ===
On January 5, 2016, Young signed a minor league contract with the Milwaukee Brewers, with an invitation to spring training. He was one of nine players competing to be the Brewers center fielder for the 2016 season. Center field was one of the last positions the Brewers decided, but Young did not make the Opening Day roster.

=== New York Yankees ===
On August 31, 2016, the Brewers traded Young to the New York Yankees for cash considerations. The Yankees assigned him to the Scranton/Wilkes-Barre RailRiders. He played in 6 games for the Yankees, primarily as a pinch runner, scoring twice, stealing one base, and batting 0-for-1.

=== Los Angeles Angels ===
On January 24, 2017, the Los Angeles Angels signed Young to a minor league deal, later calling him up to replace the injured Mike Trout. On May 31, Young hit a game-winning solo home run in the eighth inning to give the Angels a 2–1 lead against the Atlanta Braves. This was his first home run since 2014. The Angels went on to win by that score. He was outrighted on July 13. He was called back up during the end of the season. In 110 at bats, Young tied a career high by hitting 4 home runs; he was outrighted and elected free agency after the season.

On January 4, 2018, the Angels re-signed Young to a minor league deal. He was assigned to AAA Salt Lake Bees for the 2018 season. He was recalled on July 27. In 109 at bats, he batted .202/.248/.303.

=== Baltimore Orioles ===
On February 9, 2019, the Baltimore Orioles signed Young to a minor league contract that included an invitation to spring training. He was released on March 22.

=== Seattle Mariners ===
On March 26, 2019, Young signed a minor league deal with the Seattle Mariners. He was released on July 23.

=== Acereros de Monclova ===
On July 28, 2019, Young signed with the Acereros de Monclova of the Mexican League. He was released on January 24, 2020.

=== Guerreros de Oaxaca ===
On February 12, 2020, Young signed with the Guerreros de Oaxaca of the Mexican League. He did not play in a game in 2020 due to the cancellation of the Mexican League season because of the COVID-19 pandemic. On November 18, Young was released by the Guerreros.

== Coaching career ==
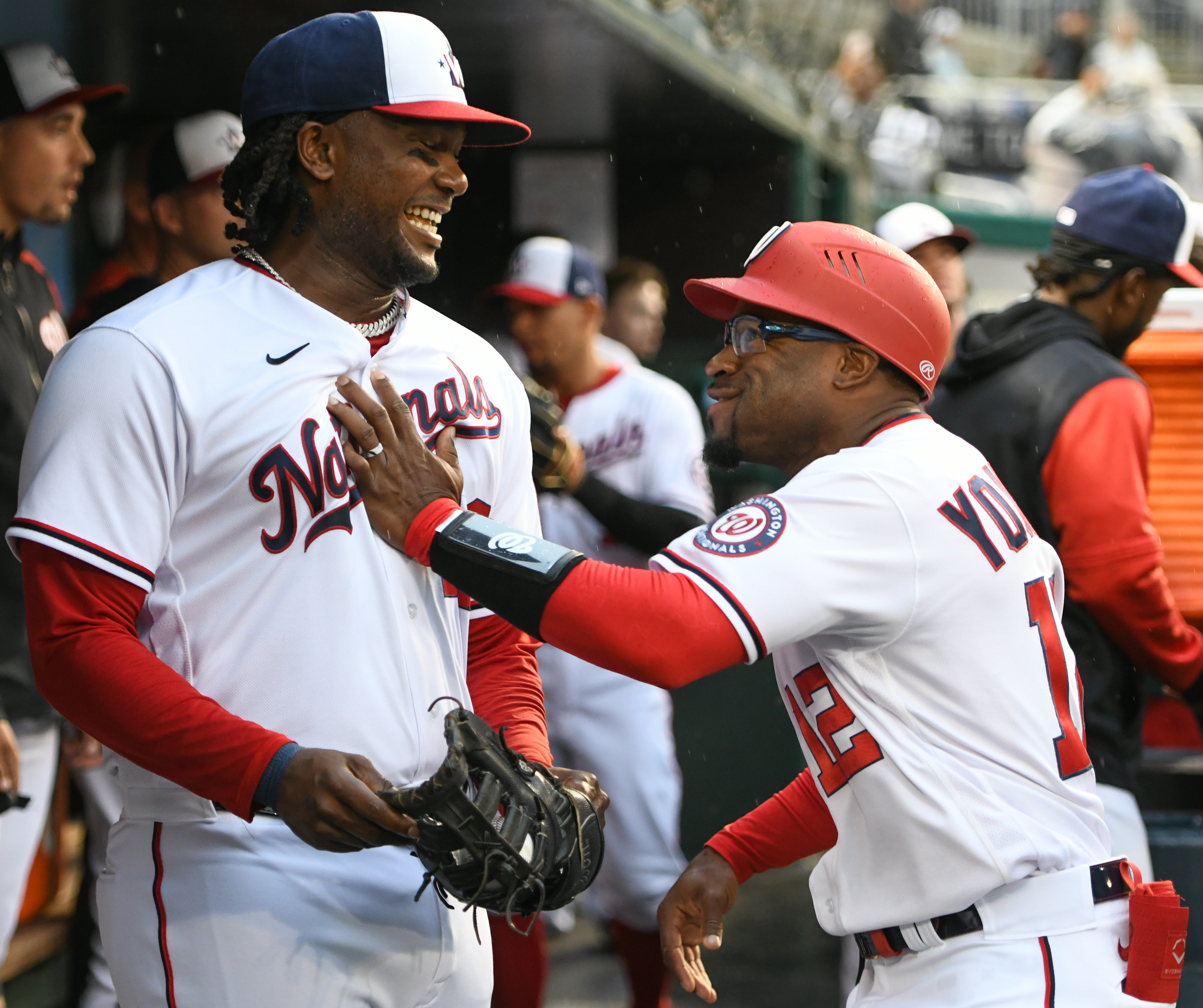
Young (right), with Josh Bell (left), as the first base coach of the Washington Nationals in 2022.

On January 27, 2021, Young was announced to be part of the coaching staff of the Tacoma Rainiers, the Triple-A affiliate of the Seattle Mariners. The Washington Nationals announced hiring Young as their first base coach on October 28, 2021. The Nationals did not retain Young after the 2023 season.

On November 26, 2024, Young was hired by the Mariners for the same role. Several Mariners players credited him with helping them steal bases.

== Personal life ==
Young is the son of former professional baseball player and Angels third base coach Eric Young Sr. and the paternal half-brother of actor Dallas Dupree Young.

Young and his wife's first child, Eric Young III, was born prematurely in January 2017 and died one day later.

== See also ==
- List of second-generation Major League Baseball players
- List of Major League Baseball annual stolen base leaders
