= Brandon Cunniff =

American baseball player (born 1988)

- Pitcher
- Born: October 7, 1988 (age 37); Arcadia, California, U.S.
- Batted: Right Threw: Right

MLB debut
- April 7, 2015, for the Atlanta Braves

Last MLB appearance
- September 30, 2016, for the Atlanta Braves

MLB statistics
- Win–loss record: 4–2
- Earned run average: 4.50
- Strikeouts: 53
- Stats at Baseball Reference

Teams
- Atlanta Braves (2015–2016)

Brandon Michael Cunniff (born October 7, 1988) is an American former professional baseball pitcher. He played in Major League Baseball (MLB) with the Atlanta Braves.

== Career ==
Cunniff attended Norco High School and the California State University, San Bernardino.

=== Florida Marlins ===
Cunniff was drafted by the Florida Marlins in the 27th round of the 2010 Major League Baseball draft out of California State University San Bernardino. He spent his first professional season with the rookie–level Gulf Coast League Marlins and Low–A Jamestown Jammers, making 18 appearances before being released on March 31, 2011.

=== River City Rascals ===
Following his release from the Marlins organization, Cunniff joined the River City Rascals of the Frontier League. In 44 appearances for the team in 2011, he logged a 4-0 record and 1.54 ERA with 53 strikeouts and nine saves across 46 1/3 innings pitched. Cunniff made 28 appearances for the Rascals in 2012, compiling a 2-0 record and 1.83 ERA with 55 strikeouts and four saves across 34 1/3 innings pitched.

=== Southern Illinois Miners ===
On August 3, 2012, Cunniff was traded to the Southern Illinois Miners of the Frontier League in exchange for Albert Ayala. In nine appearances down the stretch, he posted a 1-0 record and 2.70 ERA with 10 strikeouts and four saves over 10 innings of work.

Cunniff made 12 scoreless appearances for the Miners to begin the 2013 campaign, recording 23 strikeouts and eight saves across 12 innings pitched.

=== Atlanta Braves ===
Cunniff signed with the Atlanta Braves in June 2013. He compiled a 1.99 ERA in 20 appearances at Single–A Lynchburg. The next year, Cunniff made nine more appearances with Lynchburg until a promotion to the Southern League's Mississippi Braves. At the Double–A level, Cunniff pitched in 33 games, recording a 2.05 ERA.

The Braves added Cunniff to the team's 40-man roster on November 19, 2014, in order to protect him from the Rule 5 draft. He was invited to spring training in 2015, and sent to the minors as one of the final cuts. After Craig Kimbrel and Melvin Upton, Jr. were traded to the San Diego Padres on April 6, Cunniff was called up. Cunniff went on the disabled list for the first time in his career on June 26, 2015, after suffering a groin strain. He was designated for assignment on December 18. Cunniff cleared waivers and was sent outright to the Triple-A Gwinnett Braves on December 23.

Due to a loss of effectiveness arising from a heavy workload in his first MLB season, Cunniff was not invited to spring training in 2016. Instead, he began the season with the Gwinnett Braves. After two months, Cunniff was demoted to Mississippi, and later called up on August 3 from the Triple–A level. Cunniff was optioned back to Gwinnett on August 12. He spent the rest of August between the major and minor league levels. Cunniff was removed from the 40-man roster and sent outright to Triple-A Gwinnett on November 2. He elected free agency five days later on November 7.

=== Miami Marlins (second stint) ===
On January 18, 2017, Cunniff signed a minor league contract with the Miami Marlins organization. On April 14, while pitching for the Triple-A New Orleans Baby Cakes, Cunniff pitched the ninth inning of a combined no-hitter against the Iowa Cubs, with Scott Copeland pitching the first 7 innings and Hunter Cervenka taking care of the eighth. In 36 games for New Orleans, he posted a 4.45 ERA with 54 strikeouts and 3 saves in 54 2/3 innings pitched. He elected free agency following the season on November 6.

=== Bravos de León ===
On April 5, 2018, Cunniff signed with the Bravos de León of the Mexican League. In 15 appearances for León, he posted an 0-1 record and 2.45 ERA with 10 strikeouts across 14 2/3 innings pitched. Cunniff was released by the Bravos on July 3.

=== New Britain Bees ===
On July 14, 2018, Cunniff signed with the New Britain Bees of the Atlantic League of Professional Baseball. In 26 appearances for the Bees, he compiled a 2-0 record and 3.54 ERA with 25 strikeouts over 28 innings of work. Cunniff became a free agent following the season.

=== Tigres de Quintana Roo ===
On February 19, 2019, Cunniff signed with the Tigres de Quintana Roo of the Mexican League. In 7 appearances for Quintana Roo, he struggled to an 0-2 record and 10.80 ERA with 6 strikeouts across 6 2/3 innings pitched. Cunniff was released by the Tigres on April 25.

=== Olmecas de Tabasco ===
On May 17, 2019, Cunniff signed with the Olmecas de Tabasco of the Mexican League. In 19 appearances for Tabasco, he registered a 1-3 record and 4.63 ERA with 17 strikeouts across 23 1/3 innings pitched. Cunniff was released by the Olmecas on July 16.

=== Lincoln Saltdogs ===
On January 21, 2022, Cunniff signed with the Lincoln Saltdogs of the American Association of Professional Baseball. In 11 appearances for the Saltdogs, he recorded a 1–1 record and 5.11 ERA with 10 strikeouts and 7 saves across 12 1/3 innings pitched. On June 16, Cunniff was released by the Saltdogs.
