= Andrew McKirahan =

American baseball player (born 1990)

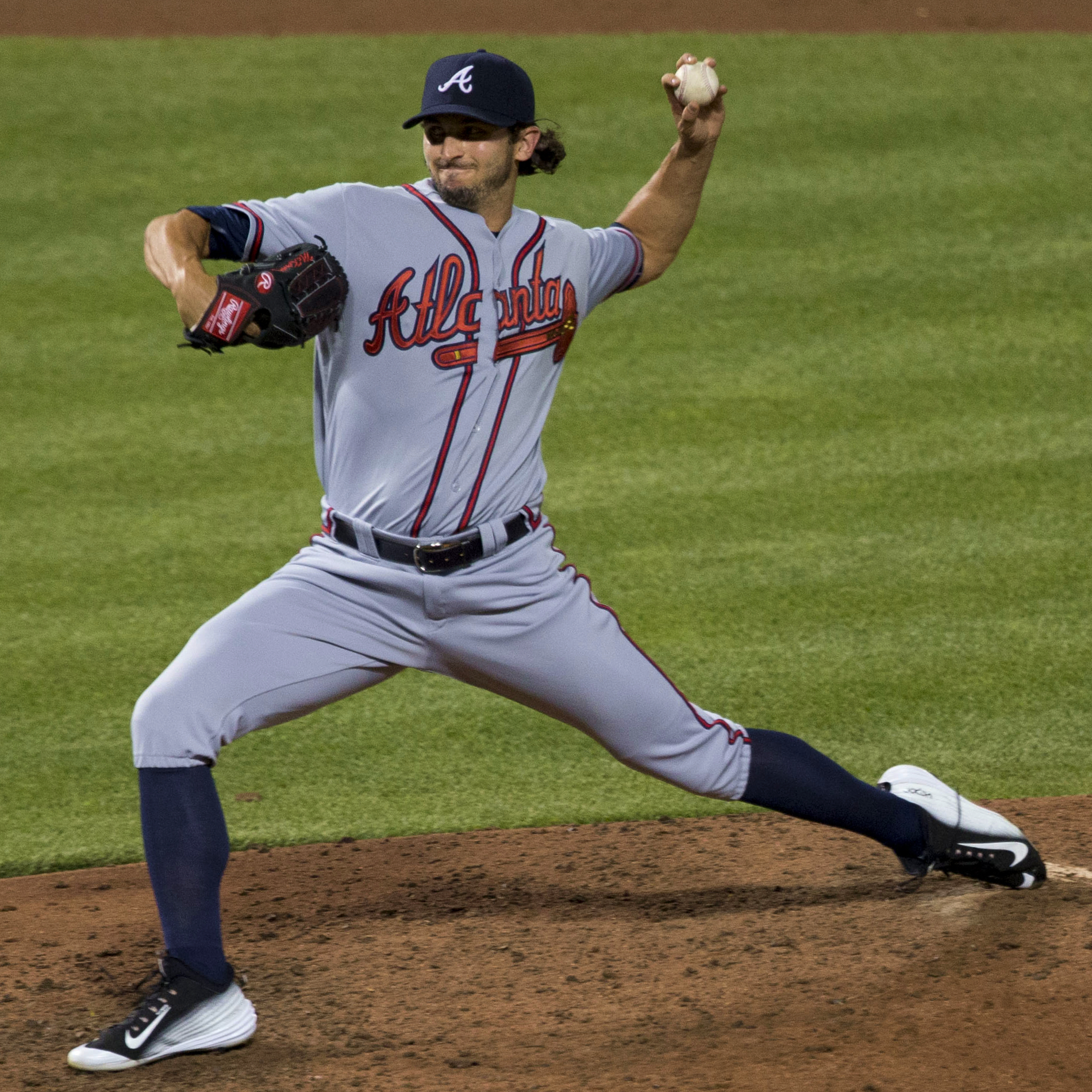
- McKirahan with the Atlanta Braves
- Pitcher
- Born: February 8, 1990 (age 36); Georgetown, Texas, U.S.
- Batted: Right Threw: Left

MLB debut
- April 12, 2015, for the Atlanta Braves

Last MLB appearance
- September 25, 2015, for the Atlanta Braves

MLB statistics
- Win–loss record: 1–0
- Earned run average: 5.93
- Strikeouts: 22
- Stats at Baseball Reference

Teams
- Atlanta Braves (2015)

Andrew David McKirahan (born February 8, 1990) is an American former professional baseball pitcher. He played in Major League Baseball (MLB) for the Atlanta Braves.

== Career ==
=== Amateur ===
McKirahan graduated from Georgetown High School in 2009, and played college baseball at the University of Texas at Austin. In 2010, he played collegiate summer baseball with the Wareham Gatemen of the Cape Cod Baseball League.

=== Chicago Cubs ===
He was drafted by the Chicago Cubs in the 21st round of the 2011 Major League Baseball draft. He suffered an arm injury in 2012 that required Tommy John surgery, and missed a year as a result.

=== Miami Marlins ===
The Miami Marlins selected McKirahan from the Cubs in the Rule 5 draft held in December 2014.

=== Atlanta Braves ===
The Braves claimed McKirahan off waivers at the end of spring training in 2015. He was placed on the team's Opening Day roster. McKirahan made his major league debut on April 12, 2015, giving up a sacrifice fly in 1 2/3 innings against the New York Mets. On April 20, 2015 McKirahan was suspended for eighty games of the 2015 season after testing positive for performance-enhancing drugs. He was also fined $221,858 of his league minimum $507,500 salary.

McKirahan was invited to spring training in 2016 and made one five-pitch appearance before tearing the ulnar collateral ligament of the elbow. The injury required another Tommy John surgery, for which McKirahan missed the season.

=== Cincinnati Reds ===
On February 12, 2017, McKirahan was traded along with minor league pitcher Carlos Portuondo to the Cincinnati Reds in exchange for second baseman Brandon Phillips. He was released on March 17, 2018.

=== Sugar Land Skeeters ===
On March 26, 2018, McKirahan signed with the Sugar Land Skeeters of the Atlantic League of Professional Baseball. He was released prior to the season on April 24, 2018.

== See also ==
- List of Major League Baseball players suspended for performance-enhancing drugs
- Rule 5 draft results
