= 2015 Cincinnati Reds season =

2015 Cincinnati Reds
- League: National League
- Division: Central
- Ballpark: Great American Ball Park
- City: Cincinnati, Ohio
- Record: 64–98 (.395)
- Divisional place: 5th
- Owners: Bob Castellini
- General managers: Walt Jocketty
- Managers: Bryan Price
- Television: Fox Sports Ohio (Thom Brennaman, Chris Welsh, Jim Kelch, George Grande, Jeff Brantley, Jim Day, Jeff Piecoro)
- Radio: WLW (700 AM); Reds Radio Network (Marty Brennaman, Jeff Brantley, Jim Kelch, Thom Brennaman)
- Stats: ESPN.com; Baseball Reference

The 2015 Cincinnati Reds season was the 146th season for the franchise in Major League Baseball, and their 13th at Great American Ball Park, which hosted the 2015 Major League Baseball All-Star Game on Tuesday, July 14. The Reds finished the season with a record of 64–98, 36 games behind the St. Louis Cardinals, second-worst in the National League, and their worst finish since 1982. The Reds also hosted the All-Star Game on July 14.

== Offseason ==
- On December 11, 2014, the Reds acquired shortstop Eugenio Suárez and minor league pitcher Jonathan Crawford from the Detroit Tigers for pitcher Alfredo Simón. On the same day, the Reds Acquired pitcher Anthony DeSclafani and catcher Chad Wallach from the Miami Marlins for pitcher Mat Latos.
- On December 31, 2014, the Reds acquired outfielder Marlon Byrd from the Philadelphia Phillies for pitcher Ben Lively.

== Standings ==
=== National League Central ===
NL Central
Team	W	L	Pct.	GB	Home	Road
St. Louis Cardinals	100	62	.617	—	55‍–‍26	45‍–‍36
Pittsburgh Pirates	98	64	.605	2	53‍–‍28	45‍–‍36
Chicago Cubs	97	65	.599	3	49‍–‍32	48‍–‍33
Milwaukee Brewers	68	94	.420	32	34‍–‍47	34‍–‍47
Cincinnati Reds	64	98	.395	36	34‍–‍47	30‍–‍51

=== National League Wildcard ===
Division leaders
Team	W	L	Pct.
St. Louis Cardinals	100	62	.617
Los Angeles Dodgers	92	70	.568
New York Mets	90	72	.556

Wild Card teams (Top 2 teams qualify for postseason)
Team	W	L	Pct.	GB
Pittsburgh Pirates	98	64	.605	+1
Chicago Cubs	97	65	.599	—
San Francisco Giants	84	78	.519	13
Washington Nationals	83	79	.512	14
Arizona Diamondbacks	79	83	.488	18
San Diego Padres	74	88	.457	23
Miami Marlins	71	91	.438	26
Milwaukee Brewers	68	94	.420	29
Colorado Rockies	68	94	.420	29
Atlanta Braves	67	95	.414	30
Cincinnati Reds	64	98	.395	33
Philadelphia Phillies	63	99	.389	34

=== Record vs. opponents ===
2015 National League record Source: MLB Standings Grid – 2015
Team	AZ	ATL	CHC	CIN	COL	LAD	MIA	MIL	NYM	PHI	PIT	SD	SF	STL	WSH	AL
Arizona	—	3–3	2–4	6–1	13–6	6–13	5–2	5–2	2–5	2–4	1–5	9–10	11–8	0–7	3–4	11–9
Atlanta	3–3	—	1–6	3–4	1–6	3–3	10–9	5–2	8–11	11–8	2–4	2–5	3–4	4–2	5–14	6–14
Chicago	4–2	6–1	—	13–6	4–2	3–4	3–3	14–5	7–0	2–5	11–8	3–3	5–2	8–11	4–3	10–10
Cincinnati	1–6	4–3	6–13	—	2–4	1–6	3–4	9–10	0–7	4–2	11–8	2–4	2–5	7–12	5–1	7–13
Colorado	6–13	6–1	2–4	4–2	—	8–11	2–5	5–1	0–7	5–2	1–6	7–12	11–8	3–4	3–3	5–15
Los Angeles	13–6	3–3	4–3	6–1	11–8	—	4–2	4–3	3–4	5–2	1–5	14–5	8–11	2–5	4–2	10–10
Miami	2–5	9–10	3–3	4–3	5–2	2–4	—	4–2	8–11	9–10	1–6	2–5	5–2	1–5	9–10	7–13
Milwaukee	2–5	2–5	5–14	10–9	1–5	3–4	2–4	—	3–3	7–0	10–9	5–2	1–5	6–13	3–4	8–12
New York	5–2	11–8	0–7	7–0	7–0	4–3	11–8	3–3	—	14–5	0–6	2–4	3–3	3–4	11–8	9–11
Philadelphia	4–2	8–11	5–2	2–4	2–5	2–5	10–9	0–7	5–14	—	2–5	5–1	1–5	2–5	7–12	8–12
Pittsburgh	5–1	4–2	8–11	8–11	6–1	5–1	6–1	9–10	6–0	5–2	—	5–2	6–1	9–10	3–4	13–7
San Diego	10–9	5–2	3–3	4–2	12–7	5–14	5–2	2–5	4–2	1–5	2–5	—	8–11	4–3	2–5	7–13
San Francisco	8–11	4–3	2–5	5–2	8–11	11–8	2–5	5–1	3–3	5–1	1–6	11–8	—	2–4	4–3	13–7
St. Louis	7–0	2–4	11–8	12–7	4–3	5–2	5–1	13–6	4–3	5–2	10–9	3–4	4–2	—	4–2	11–9
Washington	4–3	14–5	3–4	1–5	3–3	2–4	10–9	4–3	8–11	12–7	4–3	5–2	3–4	2–4	—	8–12

== Regular season ==
=== Detailed record ===
Team	Home	Away	Total	Win %	Gms Left
NL East
Atlanta Braves	2–1	2–2	4–3	.571	0
Miami Marlins	2–1	1–3	3–4	.429	0
New York Mets	0–4	0–3	0–7	.000	0
Philadelphia Phillies	3–0	1–2	4–2	.667	0
Washington Nationals	3–0	2–1	5–1	.833	0
	10–6	6–11	16–17	.485	0
NL Central
Chicago Cubs	2–7	4–6	6–13	.316	0
Milwaukee Brewers	3–6	6–3	9–10	.474	0
Pittsburgh Pirates	6–3	5–4	11–8	.579	0
St. Louis Cardinals	2–4	2–7	7–11	.389	0
	13–20	17–20	30–40	.429	0
NL West
Arizona Diamondbacks	0–4	1–2	1–6	.143	0
Colorado Rockies	1–2	1–2	2–4	.333	0
Los Angeles Dodgers	0–3	1–3	1–6	.143	0
San Diego Padres	1–2	1–2	2–4	.333	0
San Francisco Giants	1–3	1–2	2–5	.286	0
	3–14	5–10	8–24	.250	0
American League
Chicago White Sox	N/A	1–2	1–2	.333	0
Cleveland Indians	1–2	0–3	0–3	.167	0
Detroit Tigers	2–0	1–1	3–1	.750	0
Kansas City Royals	0–2	0–2	0–4	.000	0
Minnesota Twins	2–1	N/A	2–1	.667	0
	5–5	2–8	7–13	.350	0

Month	Games	Won	Lost	Win %
April	22	11	11	.500
May	27	11	16	.407
June	27	13	14	.481
July	25	11	14	.440
August	29	8	21	.276
September	28	9	19	.321
October	4	1	3	.250
	162	64	98	.395

	Games	Won	Lost	Win %
Home	81	34	47	.420
Away	81	30	51	.370

- Longest Winning Streak: 4 games (4/5–4/10 & 6/7-6/10)
- Longest Losing Streak: 13 games (9/20–10/2)
- Most Runs Scored in a game: 16 (4/21 @ MIL)
- Most Runs Allowed in a game: 17 (7/26 @ COL)

=== Home attendance ===
(through 9/23/2015) Source: 2015 MLB Attendance Report

Highest Home Attendance: 4/6 vs. PIT (43,633), 103% capacity
Lowest Home Attendance: 4/9 vs. PIT (15,616), 37% capacity

Year	Attendance (games)	AVG/game	NL Rank	W–L
2015	2,251,014 (74)	31,562	10th of 15	34–40
2014	2,476,664 (81)	30,576	8th of 15	44–37
2013	2,492,101 (81)	31,151	10th of 15	49–31

=== Opening day lineup ===
- P Johnny Cueto
- C Brayan Peña
- 1B Joey Votto
- 2B Brandon Phillips
- 3B Todd Frazier
- SS Zack Cozart
- LF Marlon Byrd
- CF Billy Hamilton
- RF Jay Bruce

== Game log ==
2015 game log (64–98)
April (11–11)

#	Date	TV	Opponent	Score	Win	Loss	Save	Attendance	Record	Box
1	April 6	Pirates	FSO	5–2	**Diaz** (1–0)	Watson (0–1)	**Chapman** (1)	43,633	1–0	
2	April 8	Pirates	FSO	5–4 (11)	**Hoover** (1–0)	Liz (0–1)		30,859	2–0	
3	April 9	Pirates	FSO	3–2	**Chapman** (1–0)	Scahill (0–1)		15,616	3–0	
4	April 10	Cardinals	FSO	5–4	**Hoover** (2–0)	Walden (0–1)	**Chapman** (2)	30,808	4–0	
5	April 11	Cardinals	FSO	1–4	Wacha (1–0)	**Cueto** (0–1)	Rosenthal (2)	41,525	4–1	
6	April 12	Cardinals	FSO	5–7 (11)	Villanueva (1–0)	**Gregg** (0–1)		41,446	4–2	
7	April 13	@ Cubs	FSO	6–7 (10)	Rondón (1–0)	**Parra** (0–1)		26,390	4–3	
8	April 14	@ Cubs	FSO	3–2	**DeSclafani** (1–0)	Arrieta (0–1)	**Chapman** (3)	27,525	5–3	
9	April 15	@ Cubs	FSO	0–5	Wood (1–1)	**Marquis** (0–1)		29,205	5–4	
10	April 17	@ Cardinals	FSO	1–6	Wacha (2–0)	**Cueto** (0–2)	Siegrist (1)	46,462	5–5	
11	April 18	@ Cardinals	FSO	2–5	Martínez (1–0)	**Bailey** (0–1)	Rosenthal (4)	45,906	5–6	
12	April 19	@ Cardinals	ESPN	1–2	Wainwright (2–1)	**Leake** (0–1)	Walden (1)	40,742	5–7	
13	April 20	@ Brewers	FSO	6–1	**DeSclafani** (2–0)	Peralta (0–2)		26,660	6–7	
14	April 21	@ Brewers	FSO	16–10	**Marquis** (1–1)	Fiers (0–3)		27,293	7–7	
15	April 22	@ Brewers	FSO	2–1	**Cueto** (1–2)	Rodríguez (0–3)	**Chapman** (4)	30,452	8–7	
16	April 23	@ Brewers	FSO	2–4	Lohse (1–2)	**Gregg** (0–2)	Rodríguez (2)	30,452	8–8	
17	April 24	Cubs	FSO	6–7 (10)	Motte (1–0)	**Badenhop** (0–1)		39,891	8–9	
—	April 25	Cubs	PPD, RAIN; rescheduled for July 22							
18	April 26	Cubs	FSO	2–5	Arrieta (3–1)	**DeSclafani** (2–1)	Rondón (4)	39,891	8–10	
19	April 27	Brewers	FSO	9–6	**Marquis** (2–1)	Nelson (2–1)		17,167	9–10	
20	April 28	Brewers	FSO	4–2	**Cueto** (2–2)	Lohse (1–4)	**Chapman** (5)	19,238	10–10	
21	April 29	Brewers	FSO	3–8	Garza (2–3)	**Lorenzen** (0–1)		23,012	10–11	
22	April 30	@ Braves	FSO	5–1	**Leake** (1–1)	Miller (3–1)		15,744	11–11	

May (11–16)

#	Date	TV	Opponent	Score	Win	Loss	Save	Attendance	Record	Box
23	May 1	@ Braves	FSO	3–4	Foltynewicz (1–0)	**DeSclafani** (2–2)	Grilli (8)	30,153	11–12	
24	May 2	@ Braves	FS1	8–4	**Marquis** (3–1)	Stults (1–2)		29,515	12–12	
25	May 3	@ Braves	FSO	0–5	Teherán (1–1)	**Cueto** (2–3)		30,073	12–13	
26	May 5	@ Pirates	FSO	7–1	**Lorenzen** (1–1)	Locke (2–2)		16,822	13–13	
27	May 6	@ Pirates	FSO	3–0	**Leake** (2–1)	Cole (4–1)	**Chapman** (6)	16,527	14–13	
28	May 7	@ Pirates	FSO	2–7	Burnett (1–1)	**DeSclafani** (2–3)		27,302	14–14	
—	May 8	@ White Sox	PPD, RAIN; rescheduled for May 8							
29	May 9	@ White Sox	FSO	10–4	**Cueto** (3–3)	Carroll (0–1)		N/A	15–14	
30	May 9	@ White Sox	FSO	2–8	Rodon (3–3)	**Marquis** (3–2)		27,980	15–15	
31	May 10	@ White Sox	FSO	3–4	Robertson (3–0)	**Chapman** (1-1)		20,123	15–16	
32	May 11	Braves	FSO/ESPN	1–2	Avilán (1–0)	**Chapman** (1-2)	Johnson (2)	19,881	15–17	
33	May 12	Braves	FSO	4–3	**Chapman** (2–2)	Grilli (0–2)		23,780	16–17	
34	May 13	Braves	FSO	5–1	**Iglesias** (1–0)	Stults (1–4)		17,747	17–17	
35	May 14	Giants	FSO	4–3	**Diaz** (1–0)	Romo (0–2)	**Chapman** (7)	21,792	18–17	
36	May 15	Giants	FSO	2–10	Bumgarner (4–2)	**Marquis** (3–3)		39,867	18–18	
37	May 16	Giants	FSO	2–11	Vogelsong (2–2)	**Leake** (2–2)		40,889	18–19	
38	May 17	Giants	FSO	8–9	Petit (1–0)	**DeSclafani** (2–4)	Casilla (9)	39,209	18–20	
39	May 19	@ Royals	FSO	0–3	Ventura (3–3)	**Cueto** (3–4)	Davis (7)	29,769	18–21	
40	May 20	@ Royals	FSO	1–7	Guthrie (4–2)	**Marquis** (3–4)		30,450	18–22	
41	May 22	@ Indians	FSO	3–7	Carrasco (5–4)	**Leake** (2–3)		23,617	18–23	
42	May 23	@ Indians	FSO	1–2	Kluber (2–5)	**Cingrani** (0–1)	Allen (11)	27,315	18–24	
43	May 24	@ Indians	FSO	2–5	Bauer (4–1)	**Iglesias** (1–1)		23,882	18–25	
44	May 25	Rockies	FSO	4–5	Betancourt (2–1)	**Chapman** (2–3)	Axford (7)	20,516	18–26	
45	May 26	Rockies	FSO	2–1	**Chapman** (3–3)	Brown (0–2)		22,523	19–26	
46	May 27	Rockies		4–6	Kendrick (2–6)	**Leake** (2–4)	Axford (8)	23,917	19–27	
47	May 29	Nationals	FSO	5–2	**DeSclafani** (3–4)	Jordan (0–1)	**Chapman** (8)	28,877	20–27	
48	May 30	Nationals	FSO	8–5	**Hoover** (3–0)	Janssen (0–1)	**Chapman** (9)	36,294	21–27	
49	May 31	Nationals	FSO	8–2	**Hoover** (4–0)	Barrett (3–1)		31,874	22–27	

June (13–14)

#	Date	TV	Opponent	Score	Win	Loss	Save	Attendance	Record	Box
50	June 2	@ Phillies	FSO	4–5	Papelbon (1–0)	**Cingrani** (0–2)		20,209	22–28	
51	June 3	@ Phillies	FSO	4–5 (11)	García (2–1)	**Mattheus** (0–1)		21,253	22–29	
52	June 4	@ Phillies	FSO	6–4	**DeSclafani** (4–4)	Harang (4–6)	**Chapman** (10)	21,057	23–29	
53	June 5	Padres	FSO	2–6	Ross (3–5)	**Moscot** (0–1)		33,381	23–30	
54	June 6	Padres	FSO	7–9	Maurer (2–0)	**Díaz** (2–1)	Kimbrel (13)	40,946	23–31	
55	June 7	Padres	FSO	4–0	**Cueto** (4–4)	Despaigne (3–4)		27,501	24–31	
56	June 8	Phillies	FSO	6–4	**Leake** (3–4)	Hamels (5–5)	**Chapman** (11)	30,900	25–31	
57	June 9	Phillies	FSO	11–2	**DeSclafani** (5–4)	Harang (4–7)		27,993	26–31	
58	June 10	Phillies		5–2	**Moscot** (1–1)	Williams (3–6)	**Chapman** (12)	32,994	27–31	
59	June 11	@ Cubs	FSO	3–6	Wood (3–2)	**Lorenzen** (1–2)	Rondón (11)	35,031	27–32	
60	June 12	@ Cubs	FSO	5–4 (10)	**Hoover** (5–0)	Rondón (3–1)	**Chapman** (13)	40,016	28–32	
61	June 13	@ Cubs	Fox	3–4	Motte (3–1)	**Cingrani** (0–3)		40,693	28–33	
62	June 14	@ Cubs	ESPN	1–2 (11)	Schlitter (1–2)	**Badenhop** (0–2)		33,201	28–34	
63	June 15	@ Tigers	FSO	0–6	Sánchez (5–7)	**Villarreal** (0–1)		29,884	28–35	
64	June 16	@ Tigers	FSO	5–2	**Lorenzen** (2–2)	Ryan (1–1)	**Chapman** (14)	33,744	29–35	
65	June 17	Tigers	FSO	8–4 (13)	**Badenhop** (1–2)	Krol (1–1)		32,456	30–35	
—	June 18	Tigers	PPD, RAIN; rescheduled for August 24							
66	June 19	Marlins	FSO	5–0	**Leake** (4–4)	Haren (1–1)		33,379	31–35	
67	June 20	Marlins	FSO	0–5	Nicolino (4–4)	**DeSclafani** (5–5)		36,755	31–36	
68	June 21	Marlins	FSO	5–2	**Lorenzen** (3–2)	Phelps (4–4)	**Chapman** (15)	36,780	32–36	
69	June 23	@ Pirates	FSO	6–7	Scahill (2–3)	**Villarreal** (0–2)	Melancon (24)	26,949	32–37	
70	June 24	@ Pirates	FSO	5–2	**Leake** (5–4)	Cole (11–3)	**Hoover** (1)	37,359	33–37	
71	June 25	@ Pirates	FSO	5–4 (13)	**Villarreal** (1–2)	Scahill (2–4)		35,015	34–37	
72	June 26	@ Mets	FSO	1–2	Syndergaard (3–4)	**Cueto** (4–5)	Familia (21)	35,015	34–38	
73	June 27	@ Mets	FSO	1–2 (13)	Parnell (1–0)	**Adcock** (0–1)		32,531	34–39	
74	June 28	@ Mets	FSO	2–7	Matz (1–0)	**Smith** (0–1)		29,640	34–40	
75	June 29	Twins	FSO	11–7	**Adcock** (1–1)	Pelfrey (5–5)		28,940	35–40	
76	June 30	Twins	FSO	5–8	Hughes (1–1)	**DeSclafani** (5–6)	Perkins (25)	28,556	35–41	

July (11–14)

#	Date	TV	Opponent	Score	Win	Loss	Save	Attendance	Record	Box
77	July 1	Twins		2–1	**Cueto** (5–5)	May (4–7)	**Chapman** (16)	26,459	36–41	
78	July 3	Brewers	FSO	1–12	Fiers (4–7)	**Lorenzen** (3–3)		40,760	36–42	
79	July 4	Brewers	Fox	3–7	Nelson (6–8)	**Smith** (0–2)		38,663	36–43	
80	July 5	Brewers	FSO	1–6	Jungmann (3–1)	**Leake** (5–5)		28,881	36–44	
81	July 6	@ Nationals	FSO	3–2	**Parra** (1–1)	Janssen (0–2)	**Chapman** (17)	23,673	37–44	
82	July 7	@ Nationals	FSO	5–0	**Cueto** (6–5)	Scherzer (9–7)		31,898	38–44	
–	July 8	@ Nationals	PPD, RAIN; rescheduled for September 28							
83	July 9	@ Marlins	FSO	0–2	Fernández (2–0)	**Lorenzen** (3–4)	Ramos (14)	25,027	38–45	
84	July 10	@ Marlins	FSO	1–0	**Leake** (6–5)	Phelps (4–5)	**Chapman** (18)	22,222	39–45	
85	July 11	@ Marlins	FSO	3–14	Conley (1–0)	**Iglesias** (1–2)		21,052	39–46	
86	July 12	@ Marlins	FSO	1–8	Haren (7–5)	**Cueto** (6–6)		23,842	39–47	
**July 14: 2015 MLB All-Star Game – Cincinnati, Ohio at Great American Ball Park**
87	July 17	Indians	FSO	6–1	**Leake** (7–5)	Bauer (8–6)		38,932	40–47	
88	July 18	Indians	FS1	4–9	Kluber (5–10)	DeSclafani (5–7)		39,588	40–48	
89	July 19	Indians	FSO	3–5 (11)	Rzepczynski (2–3)	**Villarreal** (1–3)	McAllister (1)	36,302	40–49	
90	July 20	Cubs	FSO	5–4	**Mattheus** (1–1)	Grimm (1–3)	**Chapman** (19)	34,900	41–49	
91	July 21	Cubs	FSO	4–5 (13)	Motte (7–1)	**Adcock** (1–2)	Grimm (2)	36,845	41–50	
92	July 22	Cubs	FSO	9–1	**Leake** (8–5)	Hendricks (4–5)		35,093	42–50	
93	July 22	Cubs	FSO	5–6	Rondon (4–2)	**Chapman** (3–4)	Motte (6)	39,183	42–51	
94	July 24	@ Rockies	FSO	5–6	Axford (3–3)	**Mattheus** (1–2)		37,184	42–52	
95	July 25	@ Rockies	FSO	5–2	**Cueto** (7–6)	Rusin (3–4)	**Chapman** (20)	41,998	43–52	
96	July 26	@ Rockies	FSO	7–17	Kendrick (4–11)	**Lorenzen** (3–5)		46,828	43–53	
97	July 27	@ Cardinals	FSO	1–4	Lynn (8–5)	**Iglesias** (1–3)	Rosenthal (31)	42,553	43–54	
98	July 28	@ Cardinals	FSO	4–0	**Leake** (9–5)	Garcia (3–4)		41,466	44-54	
99	July 29	@ Cardinals	FSO	1–0	**DeSclafani** (6–7)	Lackey (9–6)	**Chapman** (21)	42,334	45–54	
100	July 30	Pirates	FSO	15–5	**Holmberg** (1–0)	Burnett (8–5)		35,715	46–54	
101	July 31	Pirates	FSO	4–5	Locke (6–6)	**Lorenzen** (3–6)	Melancon (33)	35,088	46–55	

August (8–21)

#	Date	TV	Opponent	Score	Win	Loss	Save	Attendance	Record	Box
102	August 1	Pirates	FSO	5–4	**Iglesias** (4–3)	Cole (14–5)	**Chapman** (22)	42,284	47–55	
103	August 2	Pirates	FSO	0–3	Morton (7–4)	**Sampson** (0–1)	Soria (33)	39,956	47–56	
104	August 4	Cardinals	FSO	3–2	**DeSclafani** (7–7)	Lackey (9–7)	**Chapman** (23)	25,969	48–56	
105	August 5	Cardinals	FSO	3–4 (13)	Maness (4–1)	Axelrod (0–1)		34,700	48–57	
106	August 6	Cardinals	FSO	0–3	Wacha (13–4)	**Lorenzen** (3–7)	Rosenthal (32)	26,053	48–58	
107	August 7	@ D-backs	FSO	0–2	Anderson (5–4)	**Iglesias** (2–4)	Ziegler (20)	26,836	48–59	
108	August 8	@ D-backs	FSO	4–1	**Sampson** (1–1)	Ray (3–7)	**Chapman** (24)	40,512	49–59	
109	August 9	@ D-backs	FSO	3–4 (10)	Collmenter (4–6)	**Mattheus** (1–3)		28,116	49–60	
110	August 10	@ Padres	FSO	1–2	Kennedy (7–10)	**Holmberg** (1–1)	Kimbrel (32)	23,223	49–61	
111	August 11	@ Padres	FSO	6–11	Rea (1–0)	**Lorenzen** (3–8)		26,588	49–62	
112	August 12	@ Padres	FSO	7–3	**Iglesias** (3–4)	Shields (8–5)		21,397	50–62	
113	August 13	@ Dodgers	FSO	10–3	**Sampson** (2–1)	Latos (4–9)		47,216	51–62	
114	August 14	@ Dodgers	FSO	3–5	Wood (8–7)	**Lamb** (0–1)	Jansen (23)	43,407	51–63	
115	August 15	@ Dodgers	FSO	3–8	Anderson (7–7)	**Holmberg** (1–2)		46,807	51–64	
116	August 16	@ Dodgers	FSO	1–2	Greinke (13–2)	**DeSclafani** (7–8)	Jansen (24)	47,388	51–65	
117	August 18	Royals	FSO	1–3 (13)	Medlen (1–0)	**Mattheus** (1–4)	Holland (27)	28,719	51–66	
118	August 19	Royals	FSO	3–4	Hochevar (1–0)	**Sampson** (2–2)	Davis (10)	18,078	51–67	
119	August 20	D-backs	FSO	4–5	Hernandez (1–3)	**Badenhop** (1–3)	Ziegler (22)	22,063	51–68	
120	August 21	D-backs	FSO	3–6	De La Rosa (11–5)	**Holmberg** (1–3)	Ziegler (23)	26,757	51–69	
121	August 22	D-backs	FSO	7–11	Godley (4–0)	**DeSclafani** (7–9)	Hudson (2)	36,216	51–70	
122	August 23	D-backs	FSO	0–4	Anderson (6–5)	**Iglesias** (3–5)		27,656	51–71	
123	August 24	Tigers		12–5	**Balester** (1–0)	Alburquerque (3–1)		30,150	52–71	
124	August 25	Dodgers	FSO	1–5	Wood (9–8)	**Lamb** (0–2)		22,783	52–72	
125	August 26	Dodgers	FSO	4–7	Anderson (8–8)	**Holmberg** (1–4)	Jansen (25)	17,712	52–73	
126	August 27	Dodgers		0–1	Greinke (14–3)	**DeSclafani** (7–10)	Johnson (10)	25,529	52–74	
127	August 28	@ Brewers	FSO	0–5	Jungmann (8–5)	**Iglesias** (3–6)		27,632	52–75	
128	August 29	@ Brewers	FSO	12–9	**Hoover** (6–0)	Rodriguez (0–3)	**Chapman** (25)	34,365	53–75	
129	August 30	@ Brewers	FSO	1–4	Peralta (5–8)	**Lamb** (0–3)	Rodriguez (31)	33,293	53–76	
130	August 31	@ Cubs	FSO	13–6	**Mattheus** (2–4)	Grimm (2–4)	**Chapman** (26)	34,017	54–76	

September (9–19)

#	Date	TV	Opponent	Score	Win	Loss	Save	Attendance	Record	Box
131	September 1	@ Cubs	FSO	4–5	Rodney (6–5)	**Badenhop** (1–4)	Rondon (25)	33,756	54–77	
132	September 2	@ Cubs		7–4	**Hoover** (7–0)	Rondon (5–3)	**Chapman** (27)	31,165	55–77	
—	September 4	Brewers		PPD, RAIN; rescheduled for September 5						
133	September 5	Brewers	FSO	6–8	Jeffress (5–0)	**Hoover** (7–1)	Rodríguez (34)	28,632	55–78	
134	September 5	Brewers	FSO	3–7	Pena (1–0)	**Sampson** (2–3)		29,842	55–79	
135	September 6	Brewers	FSO	6–3	**Lorenzen** (4–8)	Nelson (11–11)	**Chapman** (28)	28,027	56–79	
136	September 7	Pirates	FSO	3–1	**DeSclafani** (8–10)	Locke (7–10)	**Chapman** (29)	19,241	57–79	
137	September 8	Pirates	FSO	3–7	Liriano (10–7)	**Iglesias** (3–7)		16,151	57–80	
138	September 9	Pirates	FSO	4–5	Morton (9–7)	**Sampson** (2–4)	Melancon (44)	19,620	57–81	
139	September 10	Cardinals	FSO	11–0	**Lamb** (1–3)	García (8–5)		16,363	58–81	
140	September 11	Cardinals	FSO	4–2	**Hoover** (8–1)	Broxton (2–5)	**Chapman** (30)	31,427	59–81	
141	September 12	Cardinals	Fox	5–1	**DeSclafani** (9–10)	Lynn (11–10)		41,137	60–81	
142	September 13	Cardinals		2–9	Wacha (16–5)	**LeCure** (0–1)		29,900	60–82	
143	September 14	@ Giants	FSO	3–5	Kontos (3–2)	**Sampson** (2–5)	Casilla (33)	41,025	60–83	
144	September 15	@ Giants	FSO	9–8 (10)	**Chapman** (4–4)	Romo (0–5)	**Diaz** (1)	41,044	61–83	
145	September 16	@ Giants	FSO	3–5	Peavy (7–6)	**Lorenzen** (4–9)	Casilla (34)	41,383	61–84	
146	September 18	@ Brewers	FSO	5–3	**Finnegan** (1–0)	Davies (1–2)	**Chapman** (31)	37,158	62–84	
147	September 19	@ Brewers	FSO	9–7	**Badenhop** (2–4)	Cravy (0–7)	**Chapman** (32)	30,387	63–84	
148	September 20	@ Brewers	FSO	4–8	Pena (2–0)	**DeSclafani** (9–11)		29,479	63–85	
149	September 21	@ Cardinals	FSO	1–2	Broxton (3–5)	**Hoover** (8–2)	Rosenthal (47)	43,902	63–86	
150	September 22	@ Cardinals	FSO	1–3	Lackey (13–9)	**LeCure** (0–2)	Cishek (4)	43,981	63–87	
151	September 23	@ Cardinals	FSO	2–10	Lynn (12–10)	**Finnegan** (4–1)		43,729	63–88	
152	September 24	Mets	FSO	4–6	Goeddel (1–1)	**Parra** (1–2)	Familia (42)	18,881	63–89	
153	September 25	Mets	FSO	5–12	Syndergaard (9–7)	**DeSclafani** (9–12)		26,780	63–90	
154	September 26	Mets	FSO	2–10	Harvey (13–7)	**Lamb** (1–4)		32,293	63–91	
155	September 27	Mets		1–8	deGrom (14–8)	**Sampson** (2–6)		24,621	63–92	
156	September 28	@ Nationals		1–5	Scherzer (13–12)	**Finnegan** (4–2)		24,420	63–93	
157	September 29	Cubs	FSO	1–4	Haren (10–9)	**Smith** (0–3)	Wood (3)	18,168	63–94	
158	September 30	Cubs	FSO	3–10	Lester (11–12)	**DeSclafani** (9–13)		21,397	63–95	

October (1–3)

#	Date	TV	Opponent	Score	Win	Loss	Save	Attendance	Record	Box
159	October 1	Cubs		3–5	Hammel (10–7)	**Lamb** (1–5)	Rondon (29)	26,352	63–96	
160	October 2	@ Pirates	FSO	4–6 (12)	Caminero (5–1)	**Balester** (1–1)		31,442	63–97	
161	October 3	@ Pirates	FSO	3–1	**Finnegan** (5–2)	Burnett (9–7)	**Chapman** (33)	34,180	64–97	
162	October 4	@ Pirates	FSO	0–4	Happ (11–8)	**Smith** (0–4)		35,362	64–98	

Legend
= Win
= Loss
= Postponement
**Bold** = Reds team member

== Roster ==
2015 Cincinnati Reds
Roster
Pitchers: 58 Nathan Adcock; 40 Dylan Axelrod; 25 Burke Badenhop; 34 Homer Bailey; 51 Collin Balester; 54 Aroldis Chapman; 52 Tony Cingrani; 53 Carlos Contreras; 47 Johnny Cueto; 28 Anthony DeSclafani; 70 Jumbo Díaz; 31 Brandon Finnegan; 36,37 Kevin Gregg; 51 Donovan Hand; 36 David Holmberg; 60 J. J. Hoover; 26 Raisel Iglesias; 47 John Lamb; 44 Mike Leake; 63 Sam LeCure; 50 Michael Lorenzen; 31 Jason Marquis; 41 Ryan Mattheus; 46 Jon Moscot; 43 Manny Parra; 48 Keyvius Sampson; 64 Josh Smith; 62 Pedro Villarreal	Catchers: 16 Tucker Barnhart; 67 Ramón Cabrera; 39 Devin Mesoraco; 29 Brayan Peña; Infielders: 2 Zack Cozart; 3 Iván DeJesús; 21 Todd Frazier; 17 Kristopher Negron; 4 Brandon Phillips; 7 Eugenio Suárez; 19 Joey Votto	Outfielders: 27 Brennan Boesch; 30 Jason Bourgeois; 32 Jay Bruce; 9 Marlon Byrd; 15 Chris Dominguez; 23 Adam Duvall; 6 Billy Hamilton; 40 Tyler Holt; 65 Ryan LaMarre; 55 Skip Schumaker; Other batters: 44 Kyle Waldrop	Manager: 38 Bryan Price; Coaches: 49 Jay Bell (bench); 88 Freddie Benavides (infield instructor); 22 Billy Hatcher (first base); 87 Dustin Hughes (bullpen catcher); 57 Mack Jenkins (bullpen); 59 Don Long (hitting); 56 Jeff Pico (pitching); 35 Jim Riggleman (third base); 72 Mike Stefanski (catching); 61 Lee Tinsley (assistant hitting)

== Statistics ==
Through October 4, 2015

=== Batting ===
Note: G = Games played; AB = At bats; R = Runs scored; H = Hits; 2B = Doubles; 3B = Triples; HR = Home runs; RBI = Runs batted in; BB = Base on balls; SO = Strikeouts; AVG = Batting average; SB = Stolen bases

Player	G	AB	R	H	2B	3B	HR	RBI	BB	SO	AVG	SB
Dylan Axelrod, P	6	2	0	0	0	0	0	0	0	1	.000	0
Burke Badenhop, P	68	1	0	0	0	0	0	0	0	0	.000	0
Homer Bailey, P	2	4	0	0	0	0	0	0	0	1	.000	0
Collin Balester, P	15	1	0	0	0	0	0	0	0	0	.000	0
Tucker Barnhart, C	81	242	23	61	9	0	3	18	25	45	.252	0
Brennan Boesch, OF	51	89	4	13	2	0	1	5	4	30	.146	1
Jason Bourgeois, OF	68	196	28	47	5	2	3	14	14	33	.240	3
Jay Bruce, RF	157	580	72	131	35	4	26	87	58	145	.226	9
Marlon Byrd, LF	96	359	46	85	13	3	19	42	23	101	.237	2
Ramón Cabrera, C	13	30	4	11	1	0	1	3	0	5	.367	0
Aroldis Chapman, P	65	1	1	0	0	0	0	0	0	0	.000	0
Tony Cingrani, P	35	2	1	0	0	0	0	1	0	1	.000	0
Zack Cozart, SS	53	194	28	50	10	1	9	28	14	29	.258	3
Johnny Cueto, P	19	37	1	6	0	0	0	0	1	10	.162	0
Iván DeJesús, Jr., 2B, LF, SS, 3B	76	201	15	49	10	2	4	28	19	55	.244	0
Anthony DeSclafani, P	31	58	1	9	1	0	0	3	3	33	.155	0
Chris Dominguez, OF, 1B	14	23	2	6	1	1	1	3	0	12	.261	0
Adam Duvall, LF	27	64	6	14	2	0	5	9	6	26	.219	0
Todd Frazier, 3B	157	619	82	158	43	1	35	89	44	137	.255	13
Brandon Finnegan, P	6	4	0	0	0	0	0	0	0	2	.000	0
Billy Hamilton, CF	114	412	56	93	8	3	4	28	28	75	.226	57
Donovan Hand, P	1	1	0	0	0	0	0	0	0	0	.000	0
David Holmberg, P	6	8	2	1	0	0	0	0	2	5	.125	0
Tyler Holt, CF	5	11	2	1	0	0	0	0	2	2	.091	1
Raisel Iglesias, P	18	30	0	2	0	1	0	1	0	13	.067	0
Ryan LaMarre, OF	21	25	2	2	0	0	0	0	0	9	.080	0
John Lamb, P	10	16	0	1	1	0	0	1	0	8	.063	0
Mike Leake, P	25	52	3	7	3	0	1	5	0	25	.135	0
Sam LeCure, P	19	1	0	0	0	0	0	0	0	0	.000	0
Michael Lorenzen, P	33	36	4	9	0	1	0	4	0	13	.250	0
Jason Marquis, P	10	16	2	3	1	0	0	1	0	4	.188	0
Devin Mesoraco, C	23	45	2	8	1	1	0	2	5	9	.178	1
Jon Moscot, P	3	4	0	1	0	0	0	0	0	2	.250	0
Kristopher Negron, OF, SS, 2B, 1B	43	93	5	13	2	0	0	2	9	23	.140	2
Brayan Peña, C	108	333	17	91	17	0	0	18	29	34	.273	2
Brandon Phillips, 2B	148	588	69	173	19	2	12	70	27	68	.294	23
Keyvius Sampson, P	13	16	1	0	0	0	0	0	0	11	.000	0
Skip Schumaker, LF	131	244	23	59	20	0	1	21	23	51	.242	2
Josh Smith, P	10	9	1	2	0	1	0	0	0	4	.222	0
Eugenio Suárez, SS	97	372	42	104	19	2	13	48	17	94	.280	4
Pedro Villarreal, P	29	6	0	1	1	0	0	2	0	3	.167	0
Joey Votto, 1B	158	545	95	171	33	2	29	80	143	135	.314	11
Kyle Waldrop, OF	1	1	0	0	0	0	0	0	0	1	.000	0
Team totals	162	5571	640	1382	257	27	167	613	496	1255	.248	134

=== Pitching ===
Note: W = Wins; L = Losses; ERA = Earned run average; G = Games pitched; GS = Games started; SV = Saves; IP = Innings pitched; H = Hits allowed; R = Runs allowed; ER = Earned runs allowed; HR = Home runs allowed; BB = Walks allowed; K = Strikeouts

Player	W	L	ERA	G	GS	SV	IP	H	R	ER	HR	BB	K
Nate Adcock	1	2	6.00	13	0	0	18.0	15	12	12	3	12	13
Dylan Axelrod	0	1	7.30	6	0	0	12.1	11	13	10	5	8	12
Burke Badenhop	2	4	3.93	68	0	0	66.1	71	29	29	4	20	36
Homer Bailey	0	1	5.56	2	2	0	11.1	16	7	7	3	4	3
Collin Balester	1	1	7.47	15	0	0	15.2	17	13	13	3	13	13
Aroldis Chapman	4	4	1.63	65	0	33	66.1	43	12	12	3	33	116
Tony Cingrani	0	3	5.67	35	1	0	33.1	31	21	21	3	25	39
Carlos Contreras	0	0	4.82	22	0	0	28.0	22	15	15	3	20	19
Johnny Cueto	7	6	2.62	19	19	0	130.2	93	42	38	11	29	120
Anthony DeSclafani	9	13	4.05	31	31	0	184.2	194	90	83	17	55	151
Jumbo Díaz	2	1	4.18	61	0	1	60.1	58	29	28	9	18	70
Brandon Finnegan	2	2	4.18	6	4	0	23.2	21	11	11	5	8	24
Kevin Gregg	0	2	10.13	11	0	0	10.2	13	12	12	3	5	14
Donovan Hand	0	0	0.00	1	0	0	3.0	2	0	0	0	1	3
David Holmberg	1	4	7.62	6	6	0	28.1	36	24	24	10	16	15
J. J. Hoover	8	2	2.94	67	0	1	64.1	44	24	21	7	31	52
Raisel Iglesias	3	7	4.15	18	16	0	95.1	81	44	44	11	28	104
John Lamb	1	5	5.80	10	10	0	49.2	58	32	32	8	19	58
Mike Leake	9	5	3.56	21	21	0	136.2	123	55	54	14	34	90
Sam LeCure	0	2	3.15	19	0	0	20.0	16	9	7	2	7	15
Michael Lorenzen	4	9	5.40	27	21	0	113.1	131	70	68	18	57	83
Jason Marquis	3	4	6.46	9	9	0	47.1	64	37	34	10	14	37
Ryan Mattheus	2	4	4.09	57	0	0	55.0	67	30	25	3	17	35
Jon Moscot	1	1	4.63	3	3	0	11.2	11	6	6	2	5	6
Manny Parra	1	2	3.90	40	0	0	32.1	32	15	14	2	6	23
Keyvius Sampson	2	6	6.54	13	12	0	52.1	67	38	38	7	26	42
Josh Smith	0	4	6.89	9	7	0	32.2	42	27	25	5	21	30
Pedro Villarreal	1	3	3.42	29	0	0	50.0	57	24	19	6	12	29
Team totals	64	98	4.33	162	162	35	1453.1	1436	754	700	177	544	1252

== Awards and honors ==
All-Star Game

- Todd Frazier, 3B, Starter
- Aroldis Chapman, Pitcher, Reserve

== Farm system ==
Level	Team	League	Manager
AAA	Louisville Bats	International League	Delino DeShields
AA	Pensacola Blue Wahoos	Southern League	Pat Kelly
High A	Daytona Tortugas	Florida State League	Eli Marrero
A	Dayton Dragons	Midwest League	José Nieves
Rookie
Rookie	Billings Mustangs	Pioneer League	Dick Schofield
Rookie	AZL Reds	Arizona League	Ray Martinez
Rookie	DSL Reds	Dominican Summer League	Luis Saturria
Rookie	DSL Rojos	Dominican Summer League	José Castro

Minor League Baseball standings
