= List of Arizona Diamondbacks minor league affiliates =

Current Arizona Diamondbacks domestic minor league affiliate locations

The Arizona Diamondbacks farm system consists of seven Minor League Baseball affiliates across the United States and in the Dominican Republic. Four teams are independently owned, while three—the Arizona Complex League D-backs and two Dominican Summer League Arizona teams—are owned by the major league club.

The Diamondbacks have been affiliated with the Low-A Visalia Rawhide of the California League since 2007, making it the longest-running active affiliation in the organization among teams not owned by the Diamondbacks. Arizona's longest affiliation was with the Rookie Missoula Osprey of the Pioneer League for 23 seasons from 1999 to 2020. Their newest affiliate is the Amarillo Sod Poodles of the Texas League, which became the Diamondbacks' Double-A club in 2021.

Geographically, Arizona's closest domestic affiliates are the Arizona Complex League D-backs of the Rookie Arizona Complex League, which are approximately 13 miles (21 km) away. Arizona's furthest domestic affiliate is the Hillsboro Hops of the High-A Northwest League some 1,015 miles (1,633 km) away.

== Current affiliates ==
The Arizona Diamondbacks farm system consists of seven minor league affiliates.

| Class | Team | League | Location | Ballpark | Affiliated |
|---|---|---|---|---|---|
| Triple-A | Reno Aces | Pacific Coast League | Reno, Nevada | Greater Nevada Field | 2009 |
| Double-A | Amarillo Sod Poodles | Texas League | Amarillo, Texas | Hodgetown | 2021 |
| High-A | Hillsboro Hops | Northwest League | Hillsboro, Oregon | Hillsboro Ballpark | 2013 |
| Single-A | Visalia Rawhide | California League | Visalia, California | Valley Strong Ballpark | 2007 |
| Rookie | ACL D-backs | Arizona Complex League | Scottsdale, Arizona | Salt River Fields at Talking Stick | 2024 |
| Rookie | DSL Arizona Black | Dominican Summer League | Boca Chica, Santo Domingo | Baseball City Complex | 2016 |
| Rookie | DSL Arizona Red | Dominican Summer League | Boca Chica, Santo Domingo | Baseball City Complex | 2016 |

== Past affiliates ==
=== Key ===
| Season | Each year is linked to an article about that particular Diamondbacks season. |

=== 1996–2020 ===
Minor League Baseball operated with six classes (Triple-A, Double-A, Class A-Advanced, Class A, Class A Short Season, and Rookie) from 1996 to 2020. The Rookie level consisted of domestic and foreign circuits.

| Season | Triple-A | Double-A | Class A-Advanced | Class A | Class A Short Season | Rookie | Foreign Rookie | Ref. |
|---|---|---|---|---|---|---|---|---|
| 1996 | — | — | Visalia Oaks (Note: In 1996, the Diamondbacks shared the Class A-Advanced Visalia Oaks with the Detroit Tigers.) | — | — | Lethbridge Black Diamonds; AZL Diamondbacks | DSL D-backs | |
| 1997 | — | — | High Desert Mavericks | South Bend Silver Hawks | — | Lethbridge Black Diamonds; AZL Diamondbacks | DSL D-backs | |
| 1998 | Tucson Sidewinders | — | High Desert Mavericks | South Bend Silver Hawks | — | Lethbridge Black Diamonds; AZL Diamondbacks | DSL D-backs | |
| 1999 | Tucson Sidewinders | El Paso Diablos | High Desert Mavericks | South Bend Silver Hawks | — | Missoula Osprey; AZL Diamondbacks | DSL D-backs | |
| 2000 | Tucson Sidewinders | El Paso Diablos | High Desert Mavericks | South Bend Silver Hawks | — | Missoula Osprey; AZL Diamondbacks | DSL D-backs; DSL D-backs/Red Sox | |
| 2001 | Tucson Sidewinders | El Paso Diablos | Lancaster JetHawks | South Bend Silver Hawks | Yakima Bears | Missoula Osprey | DSL D-backs | |
| 2002 | Tucson Sidewinders | El Paso Diablos | Lancaster JetHawks | South Bend Silver Hawks | Yakima Bears | Missoula Osprey | DSL D-backs | |
| 2003 | Tucson Sidewinders | El Paso Diablos | Lancaster JetHawks | South Bend Silver Hawks | Yakima Bears | Missoula Osprey | DSL D-backs; DSL D-backs/Expos | |
| 2004 | Tucson Sidewinders | El Paso Diablos | Lancaster JetHawks | South Bend Silver Hawks | Yakima Bears | Missoula Osprey | DSL D-backs | |
| 2005 | Tucson Sidewinders | Tennessee Smokies | Lancaster JetHawks | South Bend Silver Hawks | Yakima Bears | Missoula Osprey | DSL D-backs | |
| 2006 | Tucson Sidewinders | Tennessee Smokies | Lancaster JetHawks | South Bend Silver Hawks | Yakima Bears | Missoula Osprey | DSL D-backs | |
| 2007 | Tucson Sidewinders | Mobile BayBears | Visalia Oaks | South Bend Silver Hawks | Yakima Bears | Missoula Osprey | DSL D-backs | |
| 2008 | Tucson Sidewinders | Mobile BayBears | Visalia Oaks | South Bend Silver Hawks | Yakima Bears | Missoula Osprey | DSL D-backs; DSL D-backs/Reds | |
| 2009 | Reno Aces | Mobile BayBears | Visalia Rawhide | South Bend Silver Hawks | Yakima Bears | Missoula Osprey | DSL D-backs | |
| 2010 | Reno Aces | Mobile BayBears | Visalia Rawhide | South Bend Silver Hawks | Yakima Bears | Missoula Osprey | DSL D-backs | |
| 2011 | Reno Aces | Mobile BayBears | Visalia Rawhide | South Bend Silver Hawks | Yakima Bears | Missoula Osprey; AZL D-backs | DSL D-backs | |
| 2012 | Reno Aces | Mobile BayBears | Visalia Rawhide | South Bend Silver Hawks | Yakima Bears | Missoula Osprey; AZL D-backs | DSL D-backs; DSL D-backs/Reds | |
| 2013 | Reno Aces | Mobile BayBears | Visalia Rawhide | South Bend Silver Hawks | Hillsboro Hops | Missoula Osprey; AZL D-backs | DSL D-backs; DSL Rojos (Note: In 2013, the Diamondbacks shared the Rookie DSL Rojos with the Cincinnati Reds.) | |
| 2014 | Reno Aces | Mobile BayBears | Visalia Rawhide | South Bend Silver Hawks | Hillsboro Hops | Missoula Osprey; AZL D-backs | DSL D-backs | |
| 2015 | Reno Aces | Mobile BayBears | Visalia Rawhide | Kane County Cougars | Hillsboro Hops | Missoula Osprey; AZL D-backs | DSL D-backs | |
| 2016 | Reno Aces | Mobile BayBears | Visalia Rawhide | Kane County Cougars | Hillsboro Hops | Missoula Osprey; AZL D-backs | DSL D-backs 1 DSL D-backs 2 | |
| 2017 | Reno Aces | Jackson Generals | Visalia Rawhide | Kane County Cougars | Hillsboro Hops | Missoula Osprey; AZL D-backs | DSL D-backs 1 DSL D-backs 2 | |
| 2018 | Reno Aces | Jackson Generals | Visalia Rawhide | Kane County Cougars | Hillsboro Hops | Missoula Osprey; AZL D-backs | DSL D-backs 1 DSL D-backs 2 | |
| 2019 | Reno Aces | Jackson Generals | Visalia Rawhide | Kane County Cougars | Hillsboro Hops | Missoula Osprey; AZL D-backs | DSL D-backs 1 DSL D-backs 2 | |
| 2020 (Note: The 2020 Minor League Baseball season was cancelled due to the COVID-19 pandemic.) | Reno Aces | Jackson Generals | Visalia Rawhide | Kane County Cougars | Hillsboro Hops | Missoula PaddleHeads; AZL D-backs | DSL D-backs 1 DSL D-backs 2 | |

=== 2021–present ===
The current structure of Minor League Baseball is the result of an overall contraction of the system beginning with the 2021 season. Class A was reduced to two levels: High-A and Low-A. Low-A was reclassified as Single-A in 2022.

| Season | Triple-A | Double-A | High-A | Single-A | Rookie | Foreign Rookie | Ref. |
|---|---|---|---|---|---|---|---|
| 2021 | Reno Aces | Amarillo Sod Poodles | Hillsboro Hops | Visalia Rawhide | ACL D-backs | DSL D-backs 1 DSL D-backs 2 | |
| 2022 | Reno Aces | Amarillo Sod Poodles | Hillsboro Hops | Visalia Rawhide | ACL D-backs Black; ACL D-backs Red | DSL D-backs Black; DSL D-backs Red | |
| 2023 | Reno Aces | Amarillo Sod Poodles | Hillsboro Hops | Visalia Rawhide | ACL D-backs Black; ACL D-backs Red | DSL Arizona Black; DSL Arizona Red | |
| 2024 | Reno Aces | Amarillo Sod Poodles | Hillsboro Hops | Visalia Rawhide | ACL D-backs | DSL Arizona Black; DSL Arizona Red | |
| 2025 | Reno Aces | Amarillo Sod Poodles | Hillsboro Hops | Visalia Rawhide | ACL D-backs | DSL Arizona Black; DSL Arizona Red | |
| 2026 | Reno Aces | Amarillo Sod Poodles | Hillsboro Hops | Visalia Rawhide | ACL D-backs | DSL Arizona Black; DSL Arizona Red | |
