= Keyvius Sampson =

American baseball player (born 1991)

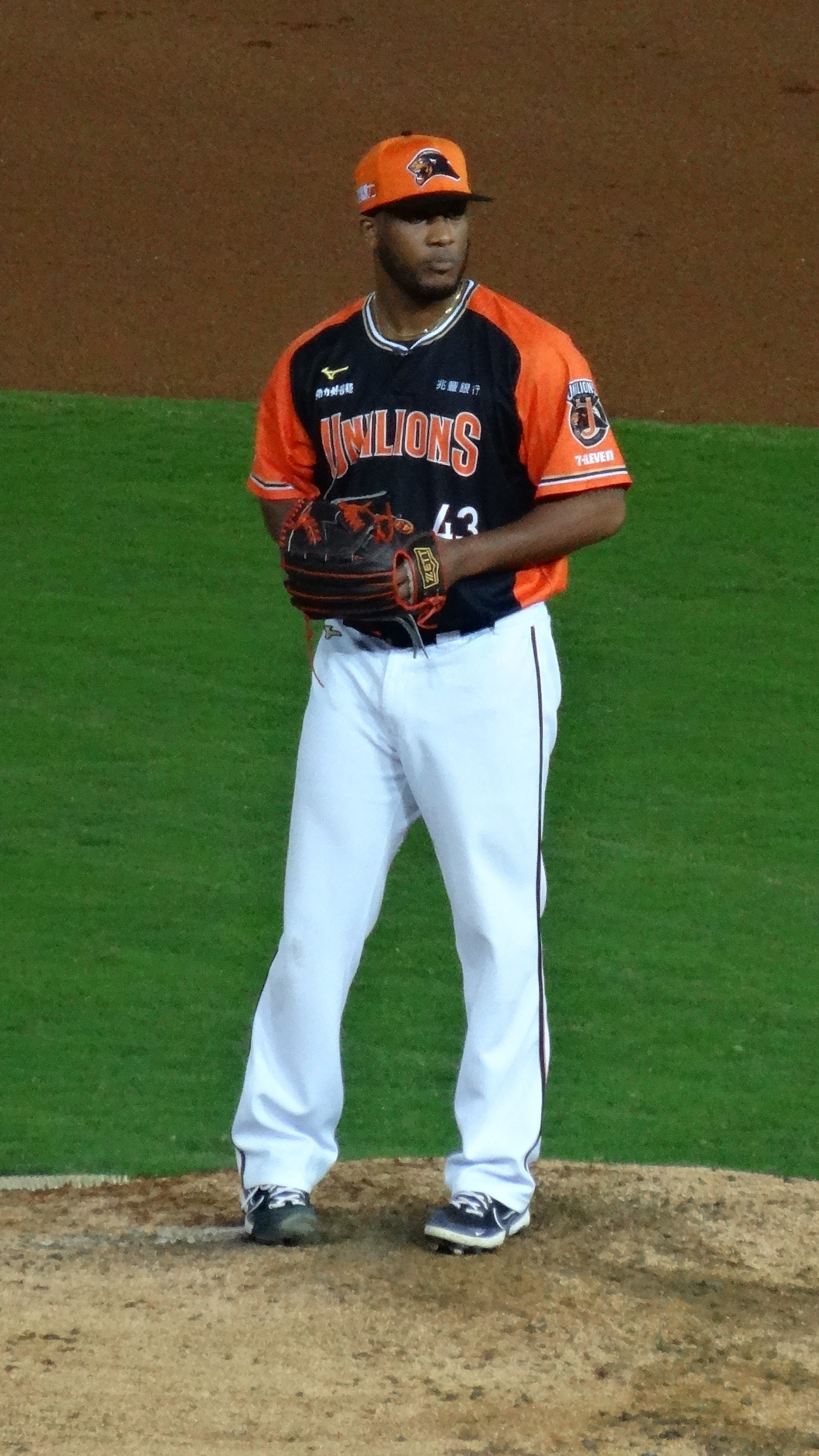
- Sampson with the Uni-President Lions

Charleston Dirty Birds – No. 23
- Pitcher
- Born: January 6, 1991 (age 35); Gainesville, Florida, U.S.
- Bats: Right Throws: Right

Professional debut
- MLB: July 30, 2015, for the Cincinnati Reds
- KBO: March 24, 2018, for the Hanwha Eagles
- CPBL: August 11, 2022, for the Uni-President Lions

MLB statistics (through 2016 season)
- Win–loss record: 2–7
- Earned run average: 5.60
- Strikeouts: 84

KBO statistics (through 2018 season)
- Win–loss record: 13–8
- Earned run average: 4.68
- Strikeouts: 195

CPBL statistics (through 2024 season)
- Win–loss record: 11–13
- Earned run average: 3.61
- Strikeouts: 203
- Stats at Baseball Reference

Teams
- Cincinnati Reds (2015–2016); Hanwha Eagles (2018); Uni-President Lions (2022–2023); Fubon Guardians (2024)

Career highlights and awards
- KBO: KBO strikeout leader (2018)

Keyvius Nathaniel Sampson (born January 6, 1991) is an American professional baseball pitcher for the Charleston Dirty Birds of the Atlantic League of Professional Baseball. He has previously played in Major League Baseball (MLB) for the Cincinnati Reds, in the KBO League for the Hanwha Eagles, and in the Chinese Professional Baseball League (CPBL) for the Uni-President Lions and Fubon Guardians.

== Career ==
=== San Diego Padres ===
Sampson was drafted by the San Diego Padres in the fourth round of the 2009 Major League Baseball draft. In 2010, he went 12–3 with a 2.90 earned run average and 143 strikeouts in 118 innings pitched. He started the 2013 with the Triple-A Tucson Padres but was demoted to Double-A San Antonio Missions after posting an 8.03 ERA. He was promoted back to Triple-A on August 7, 2013, after going 10–4 with a 2.26 ERA in Double-A.

Sampson was added to the Padres' 40-man roster on November 20, 2013, in order to be protected from the Rule 5 draft. He made 38 appearances (14 starts) for the Triple-A El Paso Chihuahuas in 2014, compiling a 2-5 record and 6.68 ERA with 94 strikeouts across 92 1/3 innings pitched. Sampson was designated for assignment by San Diego on December 29, 2014.

=== Cincinnati Reds ===
On January 8, 2015, Sampson was claimed off waivers by the Cincinnati Reds. The Reds promoted Sampson to the major leagues for the first time on July 30. In 13 games (12 starts) during his rookie campaign, Sampson struggled to a 2-6 record and 6.54 ERA with 42 strikeouts across 52 1/3 innings pitched.

Sampson was designated for assignment on April 20, 2016, when the Reds promoted Drew Hayes. Sampson's contract was purchased by the Reds when Homer Bailey was placed on the 60-day disabled list on May 18. In 18 appearances for Cincinnati mainly in relief, he logged a 4.35 ERA with 42 strikeouts across 39 1/3 innings pitched. On November 28, Sampson was designated for assignment by the Reds. He was non-tendered by Cincinnati on December 2, and became a free agent.

=== Arizona Diamondbacks ===
On December 17, 2016, Sampson signed a minor league contract with the Arizona Diamondbacks that included an invitation to spring training. In 12 games (9 starts) for the Triple–A Reno Aces, he logged a 6.75 ERA with 46 strikeouts across 42 2/3 innings pitched. Sampson was released by the Diamondbacks organization on June 15, 2017.

=== Miami Marlins ===
On June 16, 2017, Sampson signed a minor league contract with the Texas Rangers organization, but was released the next day.

On June 26, 2017, Sampson signed a minor league contract with the Miami Marlins organization. In 14 games (6 starts) for the Triple–A New Orleans Baby Cakes, he logged a 4.95 ERA with 38 strikeouts in 36 1/3 innings pitched. He elected free agency following the season on November 6.

=== Hanwha Eagles ===
On November 13, 2017, Sampson signed with the Hanwha Eagles of the KBO League. In 30 appearances (29 starts) for the Eagles, he compiled a 13-8 record and 4.68 ERA with 195 strikeouts across 161 2/3 innings pitched. Sampson became a free agent following the 2018 season.

=== San Francisco Giants ===
On January 5, 2019, Sampson signed a minor league contract with the San Francisco Giants organization. In 6 games (5 starts) split between the rookie–level Arizona League Giants and Double–A Richmond Flying Squirrels, he posted a 1–3 record and 5.09 ERA with 18 strikeouts across 17 2/3 innings pitched. Sampson elected free agency following the season on November 4.

=== Chicago White Sox ===
On April 2, 2021, Sampson signed a minor league contract with the Chicago White Sox organization. Sampson posted a 6.43 ERA in 8 appearances between the Low-A Kannapolis Cannon Ballers and the Triple-A Charlotte Knights before he was released on July 20.

=== Kansas City Monarchs ===
On July 28, 2021, Sampson signed with the Kansas City Monarchs of the American Association of Professional Baseball.

=== Lexington Legends ===
On April 21, 2022, Sampson was traded to the Lexington Legends of the Atlantic League of Professional Baseball.

=== Uni-President Lions ===
On July 7, 2022, Sampson signed with the Uni-President Lions of the Chinese Professional Baseball League. In 11 games (10 starts) for the Lions, he recorded a 3.54 ERA with 59 strikeouts across 61 innings of work. In 2023, Sampson made 21 appearances (19 starts) for the team and posted an 8–5 record and 3.11 ERA with 115 strikeouts across 110 innings pitched.

=== Fubon Guardians ===
On February 8, 2024, Sampson signed with the Fubon Guardians of the Chinese Professional Baseball League. In 5 starts for Fubon, he struggled to an 0–3 record and 6.17 ERA with 29 strikeouts across 23 1/3 innings pitched. On May 13, Sampson was removed from the active roster; under CPBL rules, a player is ineligible to return to the active roster once removed, but can remain active in the minor leagues.

=== Charleston Dirty Birds ===
On July 24, 2024, Sampson signed with the Charleston Dirty Birds of the Atlantic League of Professional Baseball. In 8 starts for Charleston, he posted a 4–0 record and 3.86 ERA with 35 strikeouts across 37 1/3 innings pitched. Sampson became a free agent following the season.

On March 3, 2025, Sampson re-signed with the Dirty Birds for the 2025 season. In five games (four starts) for Charleston, he registered a 3-1 record and 3.00 ERA with 26 strikeouts over 24 innings of work.

=== Toros de Tijuana ===
On May 29, 2025, Sampson signed with the Toros de Tijuana of the Mexican League. In four appearances (three starts) for Tijuana, he logged a 1-1 record and 4.40 ERA with 12 strikeouts across 14 1/3 innings pitched.

=== Caliente de Durango ===
On July 3, 2025, Sampson was traded to the Caliente de Durango of the Mexican League in exchange for César Izturis Jr. In five starts for Durango, he posted an 0-1 record and 4.98 ERA with 14 strikeouts and 14 walks across 21 2/3 innings pitched. On January 31, 2026, Sampson was released by the Caliente.

=== Charleston Dirty Birds (second stint) ===
On April 18, 2026, Sampson signed with the Charleston Dirty Birds of the Atlantic League of Professional Baseball.
