= Daniel Hudson =

American baseball player (born 1987)

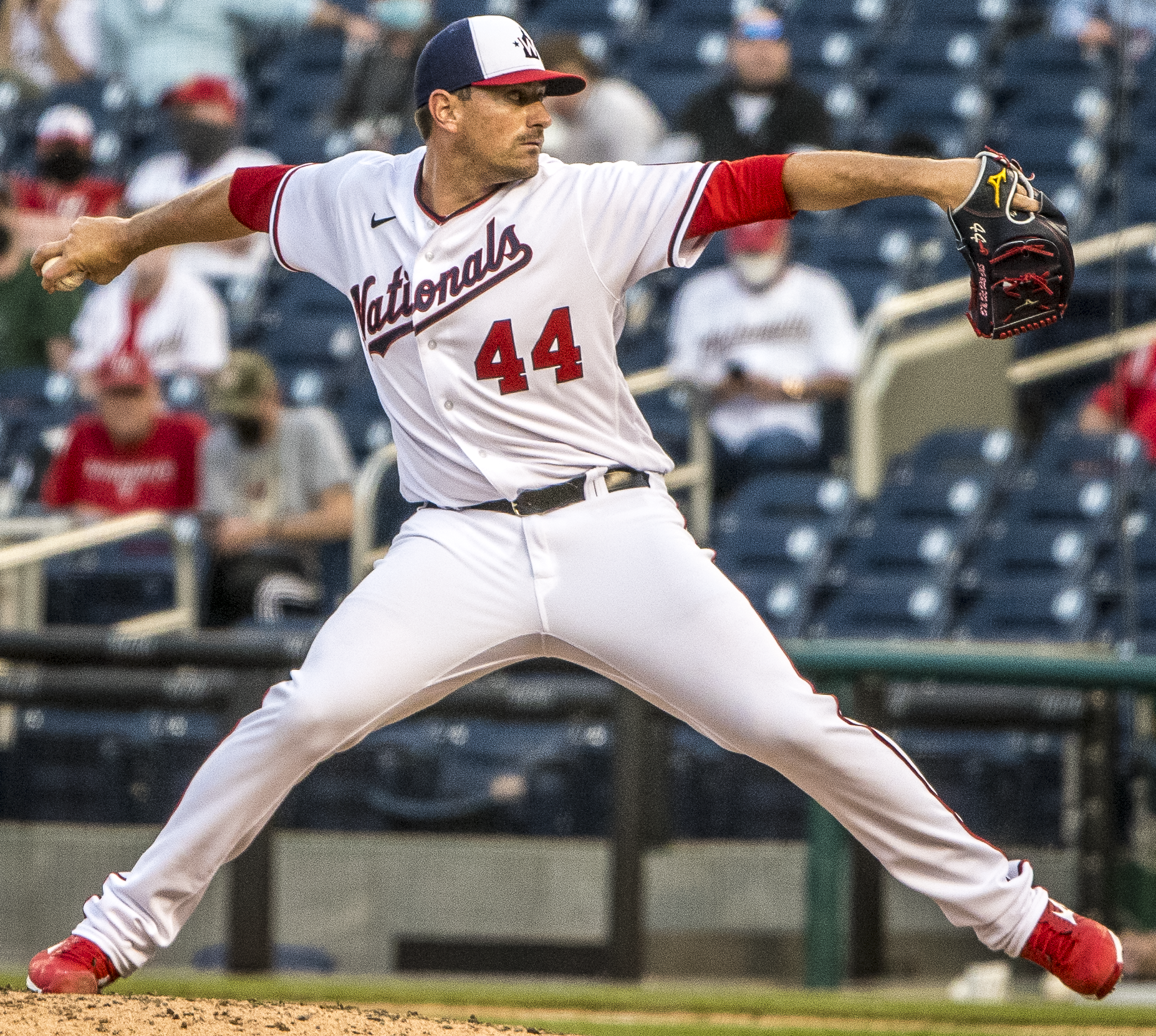
- Hudson with the Washington Nationals in 2021
- Pitcher
- Born: March 9, 1987 (age 39); Lynchburg, Virginia, U.S.
- Batted: Right Threw: Right

MLB debut
- September 4, 2009, for the Chicago White Sox

Last MLB appearance
- September 27, 2024, for the Los Angeles Dodgers

MLB statistics
- Win–loss record: 65–45
- Earned run average: 3.74
- Strikeouts: 817
- Stats at Baseball Reference

Teams
- Chicago White Sox (2009–2010); Arizona Diamondbacks (2010–2012, 2014–2016); Pittsburgh Pirates (2017); Los Angeles Dodgers (2018); Toronto Blue Jays (2019); Washington Nationals (2019–2021); San Diego Padres (2021); Los Angeles Dodgers (2022–2024)

Career highlights and awards
- 2× World Series champion (2019, 2024); Silver Slugger Award (2011)

Daniel Claiborne Hudson (born March 9, 1987) is an American former professional baseball pitcher who played 16 seasons of Major League Baseball (MLB) from 2009 to 2024. Hudson was drafted by the Chicago White Sox in the fifth round of the 2008 MLB draft. He made his MLB debut for the White Sox in 2009 and has also played for the Arizona Diamondbacks, Pittsburgh Pirates, Los Angeles Dodgers, Toronto Blue Jays, Washington Nationals, and San Diego Padres. Hudson was on the mound at the end of Game 7 of the 2019 World Series to clinch the Nationals' first championship. In his final season, he won his second World Series in 2024 with the Dodgers.

== Amateur career ==
Hudson attended Princess Anne High School in Virginia Beach, Virginia, and Old Dominion University in Norfolk, Virginia, where he played college baseball for the Old Dominion Monarchs. While at Princess Anne, Hudson led the Cavaliers to the 2005 state championship. In 2007, he played collegiate summer baseball with the Harwich Mariners of the Cape Cod Baseball League. Hudson finished his collegiate career second all-time in strikeouts with 295 (Justin Verlander is first all-time), sixth in games started with 40 and seventh in innings pitched with 292. He posted a win–loss record of 20–14, and had a 3.79 earned run average (ERA).

== Professional career ==
=== Draft and minor leagues ===
The Chicago White Sox selected Hudson in the fifth round of the 2008 Major League Baseball draft. For the remainder of the 2008 season he was assigned to the White Sox rookie-level affiliate, the Great Falls Voyagers, where he posted a win–loss record of 5–4 and an ERA of 3.36 in 14 starts. He struck out 90 batters in 69 2/3 innings.

Hudson began the 2009 minor league season at Low-A level, with the Kannapolis Intimidators. After posting a 1.23 ERA in four starts, Hudson was promoted to the Winston-Salem Dash, the Sox Advanced-A team. After eight starts and a 3.40 ERA in Winston-Salem, Hudson was once again on the move up, this time to the Double-A Birmingham Barons. Hudson's rapid rise through the White Sox minor league system continued in Birmingham, where he posted a record of 7–0, with a 1.60 ERA. After nine starts at Double-A level, Hudson was promoted to Triple-A. With the Charlotte Knights Hudson went 2–0 with an ERA of 3.00 in five starts.

=== Chicago White Sox ===
The White Sox promoted Hudson to the majors for the first time on September 3, 2009, after posting a 14–5 record and a 2.32 ERA, and striking out 166 in 147 1/3 innings at four minor league levels. In his Major League debut on September 4, 2009, he pitched two innings of scoreless relief. Hudson made three appearances out of the White Sox bullpen before taking over Gavin Floyd's spot in the rotation for the remainder of the 2009 season after Floyd sustained a hip injury. He received his first win in his second start on September 27, 2009, allowing two earned runs over six innings at U.S. Cellular Field against the Detroit Tigers.

After starting the 2010 season in the minors, Hudson was called up on July 11, 2010, to replace Jake Peavy, who was out for the season with a torn right latissimus dorsi muscle.

=== Arizona Diamondbacks ===
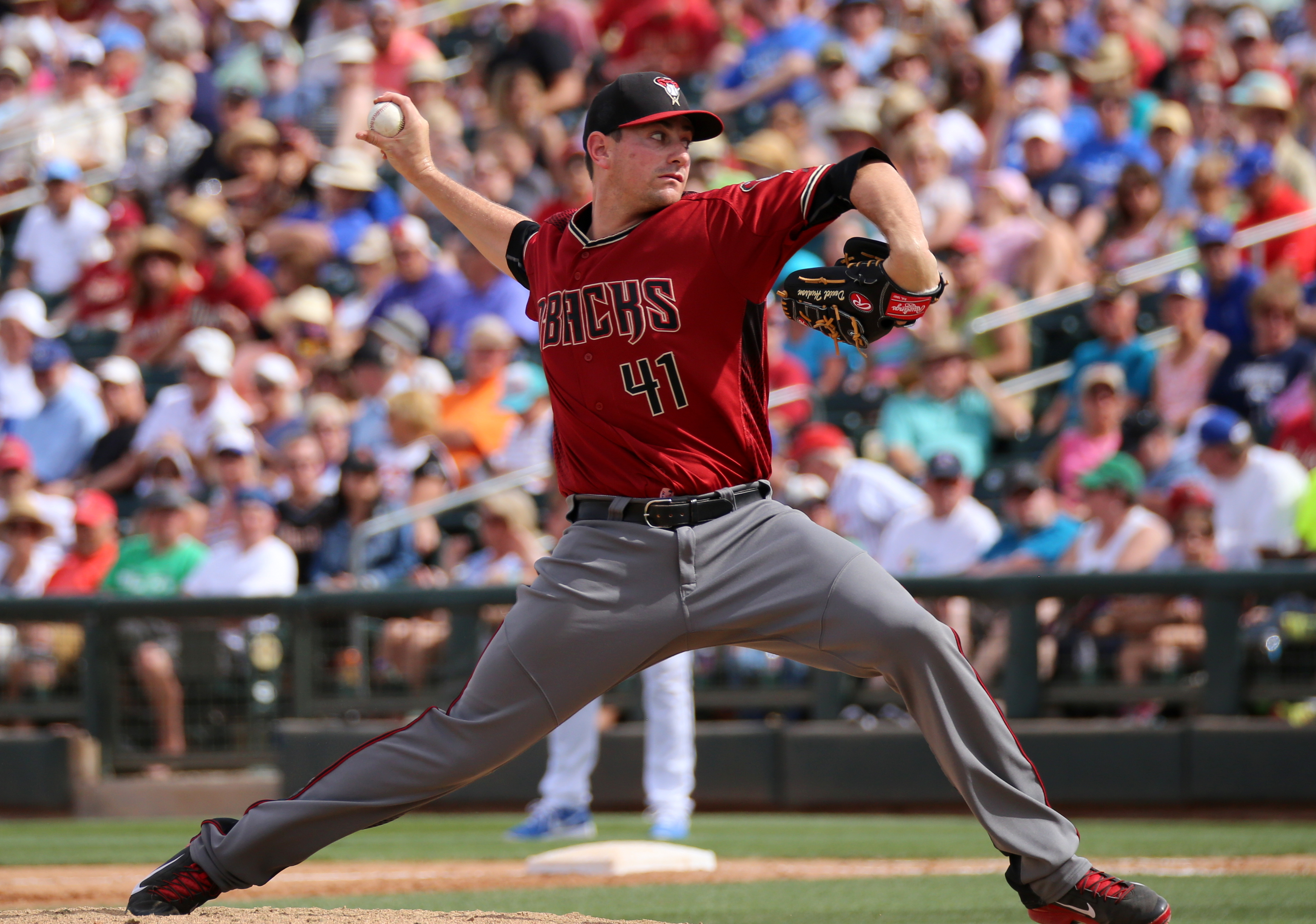
Hudson with the Diamondbacks in 2016

On July 30, 2010, the White Sox traded Hudson and minor league pitcher David Holmberg to the Arizona Diamondbacks for Edwin Jackson. He was 7–1 with a 1.69 ERA with the Diamondbacks that season. Hudson finished the 2011 season 16–12, with a 3.49 ERA and 169 strikeouts over 222 innings pitched. He also hit .277/.309/.369 and led all pitchers with 18 hits and 14 RBIs, winning the 2011 Silver Slugger as the best batter at his position. He helped lead the team to an NL West division title but faltered in the NLDS as he gave up five runs in Game 2 and was credited with the loss.

On July 9, 2012, Hudson underwent Tommy John surgery which eliminated him for the remainder of the 2012 season. Hudson began the 2013 season on the 60-day disabled list still recovering from the Tommy John surgery he previously had. In a rehab start with the Double-A Mobile BayBears on June 4, 2013, Hudson re-tore his ulnar collateral ligament. Hudson underwent Tommy John surgery for the second time in his career on June 18, 2013, which shut him down for the entire 2013 season. After the season, Hudson was non-tendered by Arizona, becoming a free agent. It was rumored that Hudson still wanted to return to the Diamondbacks and on December 13, 2013, Hudson signed a minor league deal with the Diamondbacks.

Nearly two years after surgery, Hudson returned as a reliever late into the 2014 season. He pitched in three games, totaling 2 2/3 innings. The following season, Hudson pitched exclusively out of the bullpen, appearing in 64 games. In 2016, Hudson pitched in 70 games, collecting 5 saves.

=== Pittsburgh Pirates ===
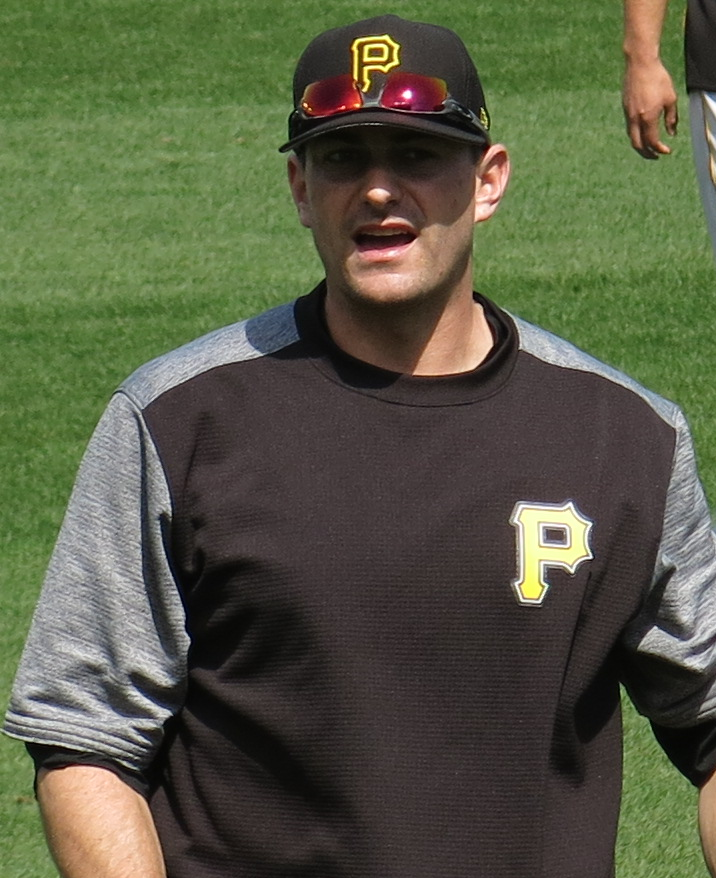
Hudson with the Pirates in 2017

On December 21, 2016, Hudson signed a two-year, $11 million contract with the Pittsburgh Pirates. In the 2017 season, Hudson appeared in 71 games for the Pirates, compiling a 2–7 record and a 4.38 ERA.

On February 22, 2018, the Pirates traded Hudson, Tristan Gray, and cash considerations to the Tampa Bay Rays for Corey Dickerson. However, the Rays released him on March 28.

=== Los Angeles Dodgers ===
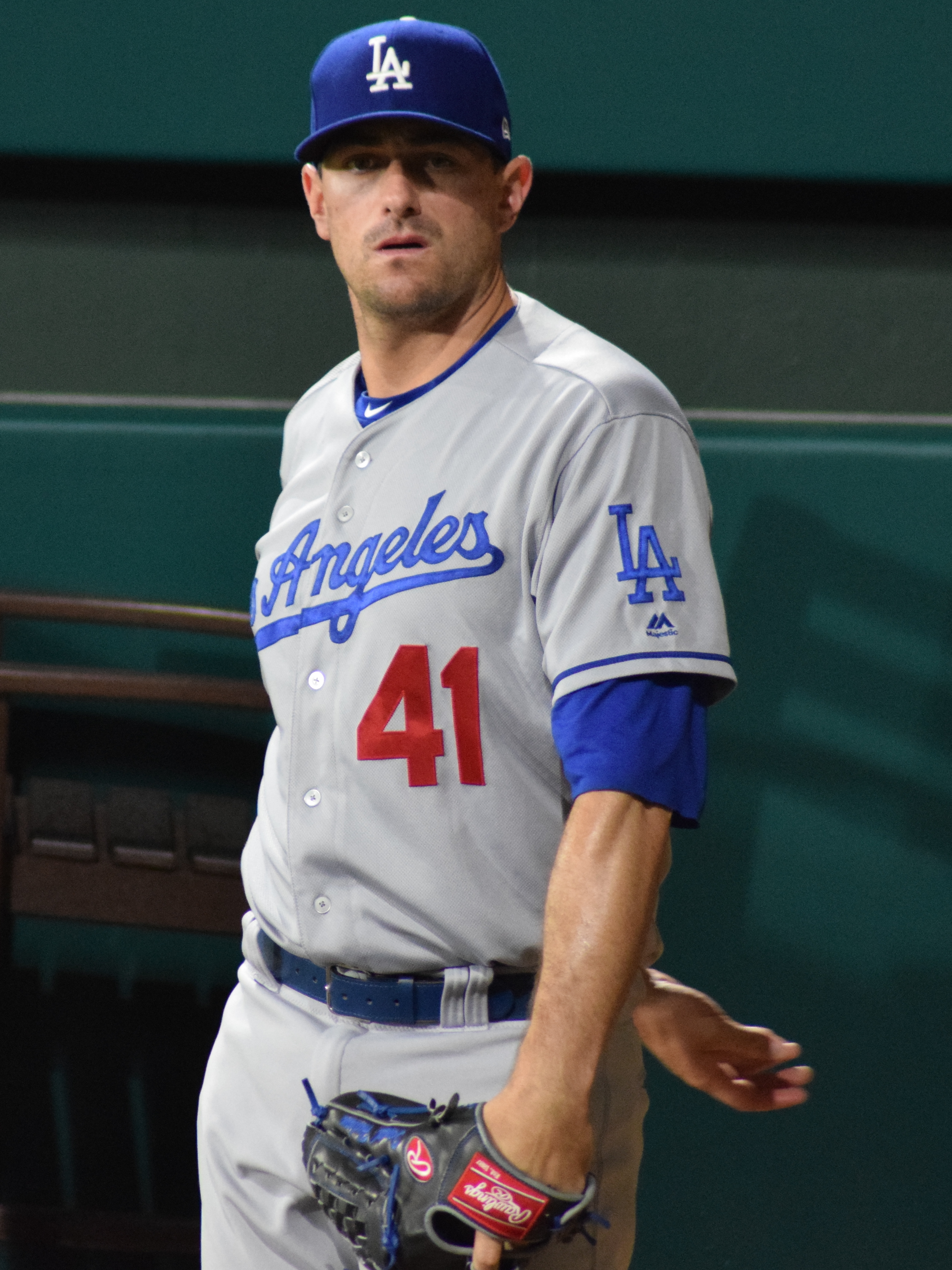
Hudson with the Dodgers in 2018

On April 2, 2018, Hudson signed a minor league contract with the Los Angeles Dodgers. He made the Dodgers major league roster and pitched in 40 games for them (with one start) and was 3–2 with a 4.11 ERA in 46 innings, before missing the last month of the season with an arm injury.

=== Toronto Blue Jays ===
On February 9, 2019, Hudson signed a minor league contract with the Los Angeles Angels. He was released on March 22, and signed a one-year contract with the Toronto Blue Jays on March 25. Hudson finished his stint with the Blue Jays accumulating a 6–3 record with 2 saves and a 3.00 ERA in 45 games (1 start).

=== Washington Nationals ===
On July 31, 2019, the Blue Jays traded Hudson to the Washington Nationals in exchange for Kyle Johnston. With the Nationals in 2019, he was 3–0 with six saves and a 1.44 ERA in 24 relief appearances (25 innings). Between the Blue Jays and the Nationals combined in 2019, he was 9–3 with eight saves and a 2.47 ERA in 69 games (one start) covering 73.0 innings.

Hudson missed Game 1 of the 2019 National League Championship Series to be with his wife in Scottsdale, Arizona, to witness the birth of their third daughter. Hudson was on the mound when the Nationals won the 2019 World Series. On October 30, 2019, he pitched the bottom of the ninth inning of Game 7 of the World Series, striking out two of the three batters he faced (Jose Altuve and Michael Brantley) to close out a 6–2 victory as the Nationals defeated the Houston Astros to win the 2019 World Series championship. He signed a two-year, $11 million contract to stay with the Nationals on January 6, 2020.

In the pandemic-shortened 2020 season, Hudson earned 10 saves in 15 chances and recorded a 6.10 ERA with 28 strikeouts and 11 walks in 20 2/3 innings.

Hudson shifted to a setup role in the bullpen after the Nationals signed Brad Hand during the 2020-2021 offseason. During the 2021 season, he recorded a 2.20 ERA and 14 holds in 32 2/3 innings. Hudson made his final appearance for the Nationals on July 26, 2021, before being placed on the COVID-19 injured list on July 29, 2021.

=== San Diego Padres ===
On July 30, 2021, Hudson was traded to the San Diego Padres in exchange for Mason Thompson and Jordy Barley. Hudson was reinstated from the COVID-19 injured list on August 11, 2021, and made his debut for the Padres later that day. Following the completion of a suspended game against the Padres and Atlanta Braves on September 24, 2021, Hudson and Adam Duvall became the first players in Major League Baseball history to have played in two games for four different teams on the same day. Hudson and Duvall were members of the Washington Nationals and Miami Marlins, respectively, when the teams faced each other on July 21, 2021. The Braves–Padres game on that same day had been suspended, and by the time it resumed on September 24, 2021, Hudson had joined the Padres, and Duvall was a Brave. Hudson finished the 2021 season with a 3.31 ERA and 75 strikeouts over 51 2/3 innings pitched.

=== Los Angeles Dodgers (second stint) ===
On November 30, 2021, Hudson signed a one-year contract to return to the Dodgers. He pitched in 25 games, with a 2–3 record, 2.22 ERA and five saves. In a game on June 24, 2022, against the Atlanta Braves, Hudson tore his ACL, leading to season-ending surgery. Despite this, the Dodgers chose to exercise a $6.5 million club option on Hudson for the 2023 season and also gained an extra option for the 2024 season.

Hudson was slowed by right ankle tendinitis in spring training and began the 2023 season on the injured list. He rejoined the Dodgers on June 30 and pitched three scoreless innings over three games before straining his MCL in his right knee on July 5, putting him back on the injured list. He was transferred to the 60-day injured list on July 12.

Hudson became a free agent following the season and re-signed with the Dodgers on a minor league contract for the 2024 season on December 13, 2023. The Dodgers purchased his contract and added him to the major league roster on March 16, 2024. He pitched in 65 games in 2024, with a 6–2 record, 3.00 ERA, 63 strikeouts and 10 saves in 63 innings. In the 2024 postseason, Hudson did not allow a run in 2 1/3 innings of the Division Series, allowed one run on three hits in two innings in the Championship Series and allowed three hits in 1 2/3 innings of the 2024 World Series, including a grand slam home run by Anthony Volpe in Game 4. Hudson announced his retirement from baseball right after the Dodgers won the series.

== Pitching style ==
Hudson's pitch repertoire is as follows:

- Four-seam fastball (91–98)
- Two-seam fastball (91–95)
- Slider (81–84)
- Changeup (82–85)
- Cutter (86–89) — added in 2012

About half of Hudson's pitches are four-seamers. He also uses the two-seamer and changeup against left-handers, while using all of them against right-handers. The two-seamer and cutter tend to be used earlier in the count to get ahead, while the slider and changeup are often used in 2-strike counts. Hudson featured an occasional curveball early in his career, but he has not thrown the pitch since 2010.

== Personal life ==
Hudson and his wife Sara have three daughters.

== Awards and honors ==
- 2009 This Year in Minor League Baseball Awards "Overall Starter of the Year"
- 2011 pitchers' Silver Slugger Award
- 2× World Series champion (2019, 2024)

== See also ==
- Arizona Diamondbacks award winners and league leaders
- Chicago White Sox award winners and league leaders
