= David Holmberg =

American baseball player (born 1991)

Kane County Cougars – No. 33
- Pitcher
- Born: July 19, 1991 (age 35); Houston, Texas, U.S.
- Batted: Right Threw: Left

MLB debut
- August 27, 2013, for the Arizona Diamondbacks

Last MLB appearance
- September 29, 2017, for the Chicago White Sox

MLB statistics
- Win–loss record: 5–10
- Earned run average: 5.49
- Strikeouts: 66
- Stats at Baseball Reference

Teams
- Arizona Diamondbacks (2013); Cincinnati Reds (2014–2015); Chicago White Sox (2017)

David Andrew Holmberg (born July 19, 1991) is an American professional baseball coach and former pitcher who currently serves as the field manager for the Kane County Cougars of the American Association of Professional Baseball. He played in Major League Baseball (MLB) for the Arizona Diamondbacks, Cincinnati Reds, and Chicago White Sox.

== Playing career ==
=== Chicago White Sox ===
Holmberg was drafted by the Chicago White Sox in the second round, 71st overall, of the 2009 Major League Baseball draft out of Port Charlotte High School in Port Charlotte, Florida. He made his professional debut with the rookie-level Bristol White Sox, posting a 4.73 ERA in 14 games. He was assigned to the rookie-level Great Falls Voyagers to begin the 2010 season and recorded a 4.46 ERA in 8 games.

=== Arizona Diamondbacks ===
On July 31, 2010, Holmberg, along with Daniel Hudson, was traded to the Arizona Diamondbacks in exchange for Edwin Jackson. Holmberg finished the year with the rookie-level Missoula Osprey, recording a 3.86 ERA in 7 starts. In 2011, Holmberg split the year between the Single-A South Bend Silver Hawks and the High-A Visalia Rawhide, accumulating a 12–9 record and 3.44 ERA in 27 starts between the two teams. The following year, Holmberg split the season between Visalia and the Double-A Mobile BayBears, pitching to a cumulative 11–8 record and 3.32 ERA with 153 strikeouts in 173.1 innings of work.

Prior to the 2013 season, Holmberg was ranked by Baseball America as the Diamondbacks' sixth-best prospect. The Diamondbacks promoted Holmberg to the major leagues for the first time on August 27, 2013. He made his MLB debut the same day, allowing 3 runs in 3.2 innings against the San Diego Padres. He finished his rookie year with his debut being his sole appearance with Arizona, with a 2.75 ERA in 26 games with Mobile.

=== Cincinnati Reds ===
On December 3, 2013, Holmberg was traded to the Cincinnati Reds in a three-team deal also involving the Tampa Bay Rays. He was assigned to the Triple-A Louisville Bats to begin the 2014 season.

On July 6, 2014, the Reds announced Holmberg will be called up July 8, to pitch the second game of a day/night doubleheader vs. the Chicago Cubs. He was sent back down after the game, but was called up to Cincinnati again on August 21. Holmberg started that night's game against the Atlanta Braves, but gave up six runs in two and two-thirds innings and picked up the loss. He was optioned to Louisville the next day. He finished the season with a 4.80 ERA in 7 appearances for the Reds. On July 29, 2015, the Reds announced Holmberg would pitch the next day to fill in for the empty starting pitching rotation spot, formerly held by Johnny Cueto who was traded to the Kansas City Royals earlier that week. Holmberg spent most of the 2015 season in Louisville and logged a 1–4 record and 7.62 ERA in 6 starts with Cincinnati. On October 30, 2015, Holmberg was outrighted off of the 40-man roster. He elected free agency on November 6.

=== Atlanta Braves ===
On December 3, 2015, Holmberg signed a minor league contract with the Atlanta Braves organization that included an invitation to spring training. On March 30, 2016, Holmberg was released by the Braves.

=== Chicago White Sox (second stint) ===
On March 31, 2016, Holmberg signed a minor league contract with the Chicago White Sox organization. He split the season between the Double-A Birmingham Barons and the Triple-A Charlotte Knights, pitching to an 8–9 record and 3.84 ERA in 28 appearances between the two teams. Holmerg was assigned to Charlotte to begin the 2017 season.

On May 4, 2017, Holmberg was selected to the 40-man roster and recalled to the majors. He made his White Sox debut the next day against the Kansas City Royals, allowing a run in two-thirds of an inning. On August 11, Holmberg was outrighted off of the 40-man roster and sent to Triple-A. On September 1, Holmberg was re-selected to the active roster. In 37 appearances on the year with Chicago, Holmberg posted a 2–4 record and 4.68 ERA with 33 strikeouts in 57 2/3 innings of work. On October 4, Holmberg was again removed from the 40-man roster and sent outright to Charlotte, and elected free agency on October 10.

=== Colorado Rockies ===
On February 7, 2018, Holmberg signed a minor league contract with the Baltimore Orioles organization. He was released by the Orioles organization on March 30.

On April 9, 2018, Holmberg signed a minor league contract with the Colorado Rockies. He spent the year with the Triple-A Albuquerque Isotopes, and posted a 7–8 record and 5.21 ERA with 65 strikeouts in 107 innings of work. He elected free agency following the season on November 2.

=== Somerset Patriots ===
On May 13, 2019, Holmberg signed with the Somerset Patriots of the independent Atlantic League of Professional Baseball. Holmberg pitched in 20 games for Somerset, logging a 2–8 record and 5.17 ERA. He became a free agent following the season.

=== Milwaukee Milkmen ===
On April 9, 2020, Holmberg signed with the Milwaukee Milkmen of the American Association. Holmberg posted a 6–1 record and 2.34 ERA in 12 games with Milwaukee and won the American Association championship with the team. In 11 appearances with Milwaukee in 2021, Holmberg logged a 7–3 record and 4.33 ERA.

=== Saraperos de Saltillo ===
On July 17, 2021, Holmberg signed with the Saraperos de Saltillo of the Mexican League. Holmberg recorded a 3.60 ERA and 20 strikeouts in three starts and one relief appearance with the Saraperos. On August 12, Holmberg was released by the Saraperos.

=== Milwaukee Milkmen (second stint) ===
On August 16, 2021, Holmberg re-signed with the Milwaukee Milkmen of the American Association of Professional Baseball.

=== Pericos de Puebla ===
On January 28, 2022, Holmberg signed with the Pericos de Puebla of the Mexican League. In five starts for Puebla, Holmberg went 1–1 with a 6.86 ERA with 12 strikeouts over 19 2/3 innings. He was released by the Pericos on July 14.

=== Rieleros de Aguascalientes ===
On May 12, 2023, Holmberg signed with the Rieleros de Aguascalientes of the Mexican League. In 6 starts for Aguascalientes, Holmberg posted an 8.10 ERA with 13 strikeouts in 26 2/3 innings pitched.

=== Lincoln Saltdogs ===
On July 1, 2023, Holmberg signed with the Lincoln Saltdogs of the American Association of Professional Baseball. In 11 starts for Lincoln, he logged an 8–2 record and 4.50 ERA with 50 strikeouts across 68 innings of work. Holmberg became a free agent at the end of the 2023 season.

== Coaching career ==
On April 25, 2024, Holmberg was hired to become the pitching coach for the Kane County Cougars of the American Association of Professional Baseball. On November 5th, 2026, Holmberg was announced as the field manager for the Cougars, succeeding George Tsamis, after the team moved to the National Association
