= Pedro Villarreal =

American baseball player (born 1987)

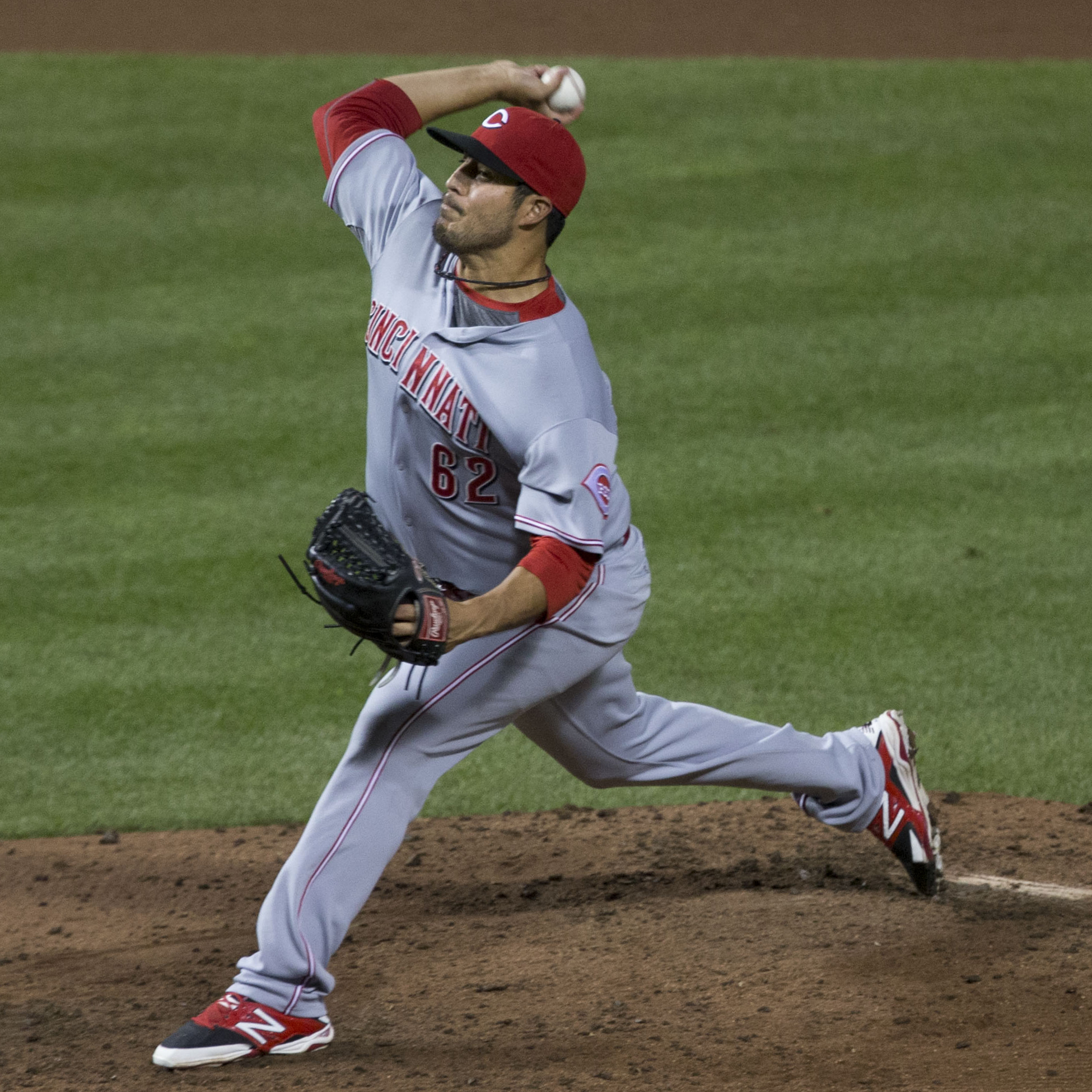
- Villarreal with the Cincinnati Reds
- Pitcher
- Born: December 9, 1987 (age 38); Edinburg, Texas, U.S.
- Batted: Right Threw: Right

MLB debut
- September 5, 2012, for the Cincinnati Reds

Last MLB appearance
- September 22, 2015, for the Cincinnati Reds

MLB statistics
- Win–loss record: 1–6
- Earned run average: 4.29
- Strikeouts: 46
- Stats at Baseball Reference

Teams
- Cincinnati Reds (2012–2015)

Pedro Adrian Villarreal (born December 9, 1987) is an American former professional baseball pitcher. He played in Major League Baseball (MLB) for the Cincinnati Reds from 2012 to 2015. He throws and bats right-handed.

== Career ==
Villarreal attended Seagoville High School in Dallas, Texas, where was a third baseman and pitcher. He attended Howard College, where he was a top pitcher on the baseball team.

=== Cincinnati Reds ===
The Cincinnati Reds drafted Villarreal in the seventh round, with the 209th overall selection, of the 2008 Major League Baseball draft.

He made his professional debut with the rookie–level Gulf Coast League Reds, and logged a 7.71 ERA across six games. Villarreal split the 2009 campaign between the GCL Reds and High–A Sarasota Reds, going 1–5 with a 3.99 ERA in 14 games split between the two affiliates. He played 23 games with the Single–A Dayton Dragons in 2010, going 4–7 with a 3.84 ERA. In a six-game promotion to the Double–A Lynchburg Hillcats, Villarreal was 0–3 with a 6.86 ERA. In 2011, he played for the Single–A Bakersfield Blaze and the Double–A Carolina Mudcats, going a combined 11–7 with a 4.39 ERA in 27 total appearances.

On November 18, 2011, the Reds added Villarreal to their 40-man roster in order to protect him from the Rule 5 draft. He began the 2012 season with the Double–A Pensacola Blue Wahoos, and was called up to the Triple–A Louisville Bats on May 4, 2012.

Villarreal made his major league debut for the Reds on September 5, 2012, a loss to the Philadelphia Phillies. Villarreal entered the game in the top of the 9th inning in relief of Sean Marshall. He struck out Domonic Brown, the first batter he faced, and retired the next two batters for a perfect inning of mop-up relief. He was pulled for pinch hitter Denis Phipps in the bottom of the inning. Villarreal was called up on June 5, 2013, to make his first Major League start for the Reds against the Colorado Rockies, after Johnny Cueto was placed on the disabled list. He was outrighted off the roster on September 2.

Villarreal had his contract selected and was called back up to the Reds on August 21, 2014. In 12 appearances for Cincinnati, he compiled a 4.30 ERA with 12 strikeouts across 14 2/3 innings pitched. Villarreal made 29 appearances out of the bullpen in 2015, compiling a 3.42 ERA with 29 strikeouts across 50 innings of work. On December 3, 2015, he was non–tendered by the Reds and became a free agent.

On January 9, 2016, Villarreal re–signed with the Reds organization on a minor league contract. He made only four appearances for Louisville in 2016 due to injury, and elected free agency following the season on November 7.

=== Toros de Tijuana ===
On May 16, 2017, Villarreal signed with the Toros de Tijuana of the Mexican League. He became a free agent after the 2018 season.
