= Kyle Waldrop (outfielder) =

American baseball player (born 1991)

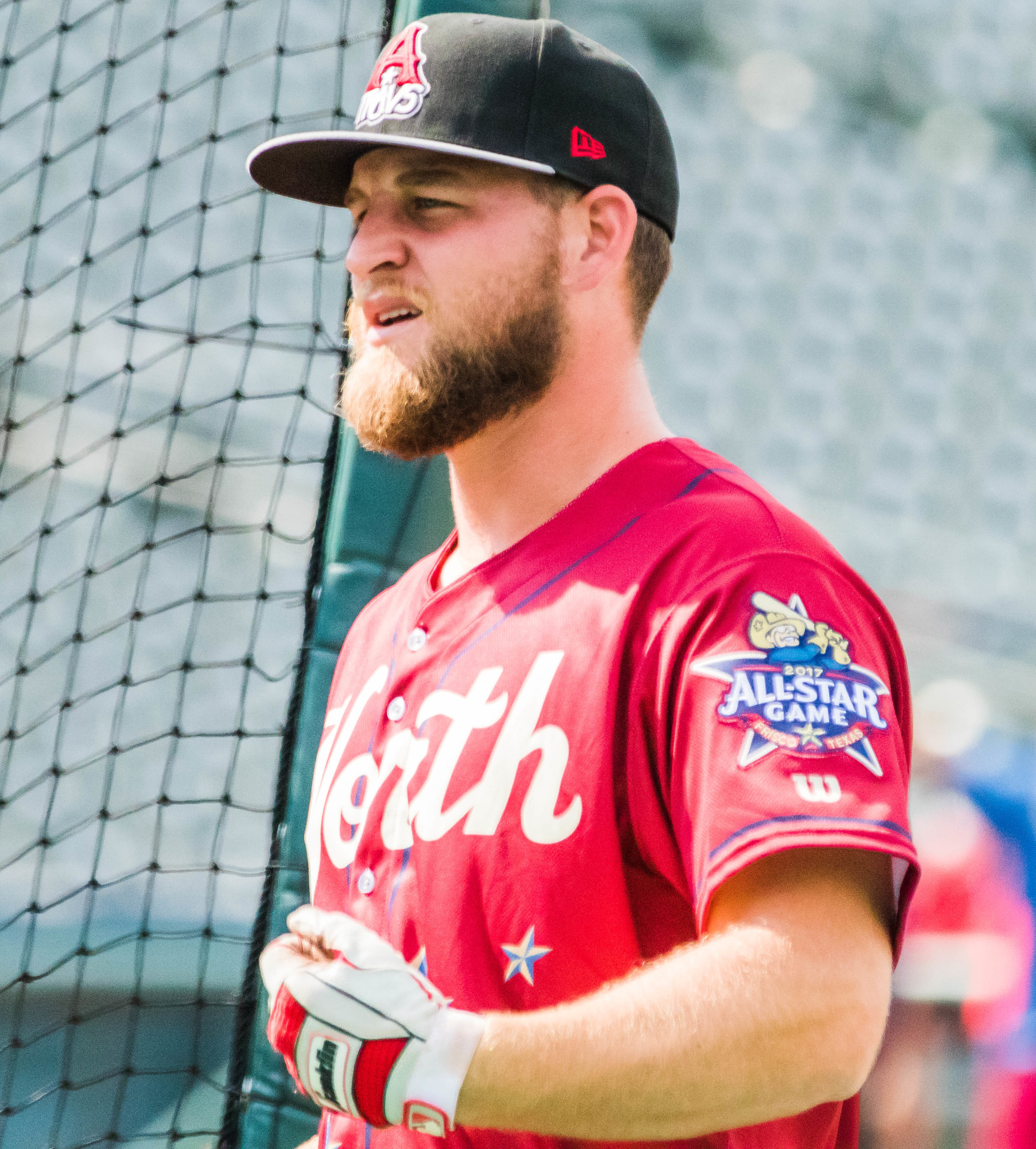
- Waldrop at the 2017 Texas League All-Star Game
- Outfielder
- Born: November 26, 1991 (age 34); Fort Myers, Florida, U.S.
- Batted: Left Threw: Left

MLB debut
- August 2, 2015, for the Cincinnati Reds

Last MLB appearance
- August 16, 2016, for the Cincinnati Reds

MLB statistics
- Batting average: .217
- Home runs: 0
- Runs batted in: 1
- Stats at Baseball Reference

Teams
- Cincinnati Reds (2015–2016)

Kyle Michael Waldrop (born November 26, 1991) is an American former professional baseball outfielder. He played in Major League Baseball (MLB) for the Cincinnati Reds.

== Career ==
=== Cincinnati Reds ===
Waldrop attended Riverdale High School in Fort Myers, Florida and played American football and baseball. Waldrop was drafted by the Cincinnati Reds in the 12th round of the 2010 Major League Baseball draft. He had been offered to play college football at the University of South Florida, but signed with the Reds for a $500,000 signing bonus and the Reds agreeing to pay for four years of college.

==== Minor leagues ====
Waldrop made his professional debut that season for the Arizona League Reds. In 2011, Waldrop played for the Billings Mustangs of the Pioneer League, and was ranked as the 21st overall prospect in the Reds' organization. In 2012, he played for the Single–A Dayton Dragons. In 2013, Waldrop earned a promotion to the High–A Bakersfield Blaze. During the season with Bakersfield, he hit 21 home runs, which ranked second among all Reds minor leaguers. Additionally, from July 28 to August 10 of that year, Waldrop went on a 14-game hitting streak while batting .370.

2014 was a breakout year for Waldrop. He began the season in Bakersfield once again, and while there, had a great season and was named the MVP of the California League All-Star Game. He was then promoted to the Double–A Pensacola Blue Wahoos on June 18. Across 131 games in 2014 with Bakersfield and Pensacola, Waldrop batted .338/.385/.516 with 37 doubles, 14 home runs, 67 RBI, and 14 stolen bases. He was named the Reds organization's Minor League Hitter of the Year, and following the end of the season played in the Arizona Fall League where he batted .300. On November 20, 2014, the Reds added Waldrop to their 40-man roster to protect him from the Rule 5 draft.

In 2015, in Double–A and Triple–A for the Reds he batted .235/.267/.338. In 2016, in Triple–A for the Reds he batted .252/.300/.363.

==== Major Leagues ====
Waldrop made his MLB debut on August 2, 2015. In 23 at–bats between 2015 and 2016, he batted .217/.250/.261 with one RBI. On September 2, 2016, Waldrop was designated for assignment by Cincinnati. He cleared waivers and was sent outright to Louisville on September 4. Waldrop elected free agency following the season on November 7.

=== Seattle Mariners ===
On December 20, 2016, he signed a minor league contract with the Seattle Mariners. In 122 games split between the Double–A Arkansas Travelers and Triple–A Tacoma Rainiers, he accumulated a .296/.363/.428 batting line with 10 home runs and 74 RBI. Waldrop elected free agency following the season on November 6, 2017.

=== Lancaster Barnstormers ===
On March 19, 2018, Waldrop signed with the Lancaster Barnstormers of the Atlantic League of Professional Baseball. In 7 games for Lancaster, he batted .222/.276/.519 with two home runs, eight RBI, and one stolen base. Waldrop announced his retirement from professional baseball on May 8.
