= Dominican Summer League Rojos =

DSL Rojos
- 2013–2017; Boca Chica
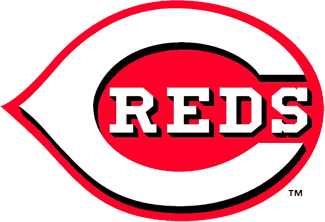

Team logo	Cap insignia

Minor league affiliations
- Class: Rookie
- League: Dominican Summer League
- Division: Boca Chica South

Major league affiliations
- Team: Cincinnati Reds

Minor league titles
- League titles (0): None

Team data
- Name: Rojos
- Ballpark: Baseball City Complex
- Owner(s)/ Operator(s): Cincinnati Reds

The Dominican Summer League Rojos were a Minor League Baseball team of the Dominican Summer League based in Boca Chica, Dominican Republic, from 2013 to 2017. The team played in the Boca Chica South division and was affiliated with the Cincinnati Reds.
