= 2015 St. Louis Cardinals season =

Major League Baseball season

2015 St. Louis Cardinals
- National League Central champions
- League: National League
- Division: Central
- Ballpark: Busch Stadium
- City: St. Louis, Missouri
- Record: 100–62 (.617)
- Divisional place: 1st
- Owners: William DeWitt, Jr. Fred Hanser
- General managers: John Mozeliak
- Managers: Mike Matheny
- Television: Fox Sports Midwest (Dan McLaughlin, Al Hrabosky, Rick Horton, Tim McCarver, Jim Hayes)
- Radio: KMOX (1120AM); St. Louis Cardinals Radio Network (Mike Shannon, John Rooney, Al Hrabosky, Rick Horton, Mike Claiborne)
- Stats: ESPN.com; Baseball Reference

The St. Louis Cardinals 2015 season was the 134th for the Major League Baseball (MLB) franchise in St. Louis, Missouri, the 124th season in the National League, and the 10th at Busch Stadium III. They entered the 2015 season as two-time defending National League Central champions and having made four consecutive NLCS appearances.

The Cardinals' 2014–15 offseason began tragically with the death of rookie outfielder Oscar Taveras in a traffic collision on October 26. On November 17, they acquired right fielder Jason Heyward and pitcher Jordan Walden from the Atlanta Braves in a blockbuster trade for pitchers Shelby Miller and Tyrell Jenkins. The Cardinals inducted Curt Flood, Bob Forsch, George Kissell and Ted Simmons into the franchise Hall of Fame. Forbes valued the Cardinals at $1.2 billion in 2015, ranking them 27th out of all sports franchises in the world, and the sixth-highest in all MLB.

By winning 22 of their first 29 games of the season, the Cardinals secured their best start since 1887, and became the first major league team of the year to reach 50 wins, the fastest since the Chicago White Sox in 2005. Outfielder Matt Holliday set a new National League record by reaching base in his first 45 games of the season. In June, reports surfaced that the Federal Bureau of Investigation (FBI) were investigating an incident involving the Cardinals hacking into the Houston Astros' computer networks, the first known such case of corporate espionage in professional sports.

By winning their 100th game on September 30, the Cardinals clinched their third consecutive division title. It was the first time since 2005 they had won at least 100 games in a season, and they became the first team to do so since the 2011 Phillies. However, they lost to the Chicago Cubs in the NLDS in four games, ending their streak of four straight NLCS appearances.

== Off-season ==
=== Overview ===
The St. Louis Cardinals ended their 2014 regular season as the National League Central division champions with a 90–72 won–loss record, their second consecutive Central division title and ninth overall. They finished sixth in the league in batting average (.253), fifteenth (last) in home runs (105), and ninth in runs scored (619). They also ranked seventh in earned run average (3.50).

St. Louis finished two games ahead of the runner-up Pittsburgh Pirates, who qualified for the Wild Card Game. In the National League Division Series (NLDS), the Cardinals defeated the Los Angeles Dodgers, three games to one. They surrendered the National League Championship Series (NLCS) in five games to the San Francisco Giants, the eventual World Series champions. Despite the NLCS defeat, the Cardinals already had four consecutive LCS appearances, the first team to do so since the New York Yankees from 1998–2001 in the American League Championship Series. Since 2000, it was their ninth NLCS appearance.

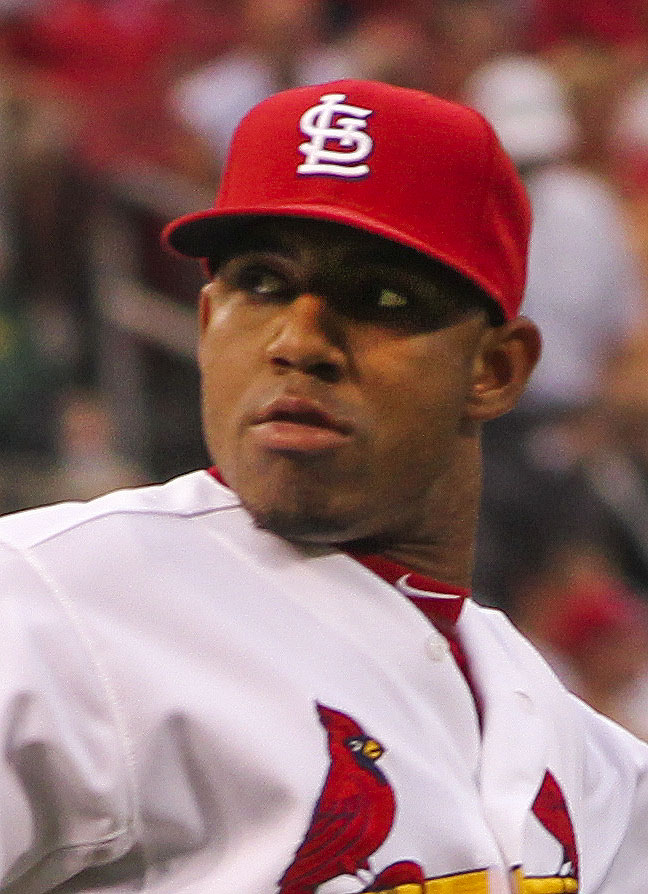
Right fielder Oscar Taveras, who died in a car accident on October 26, 2014

However, tragedy launched Major League Baseball's 2014–15 off-season when Cardinals rookie right fielder Oscar Taveras was killed in a car accident in the Dominican Republic on October 26, 2014. It was 10 days after the conclusion of the NLCS, and moments before the first pitch of Game 5 of the World Series. Reports confirmed alcohol intoxication on Taveras' part, making it the second alcohol-related fatality of a Cardinals player in a car accident since pitcher Josh Hancock in 2007. General manager John Mozeliak lamented the circumstances of both players' deaths, amplifying that the team would take a greater role in instructing young players "to avoid reckless actions."

Just 22 years old, Taveras was an immensely popular athlete and heralded prospect with fans, around Major League Baseball, and in his native Dominican Republic. On October 28, the Cardinals left the right field lights on at Busch Stadium and released a Twitter photo of the scene the next day. The following January, Cardinals chairman William DeWitt, Jr., announced plans for the team to renovate a baseball field in Taveras' hometown of Sosúa in his honor, and that the team would also wear black circular patches inscribed with the initials "OT" inside a white circle on their jerseys for the 2015 season. Further, a large decal was posted in his memorial on the wall of the home team bullpen of Busch Stadium along with those of Hancock and Darryl Kile, another pitcher who died during the 2002 season while still active as a player.

Bench coach Mike Aldrete vacated the Cardinals on October 27 for the same avocation with the Oakland Athletics. The day after the World Series ended, October 30, Mark Ellis, Justin Masterson, Jason Motte, Pat Neshek, and A. J. Pierzynski all filed for free agency. Four of the five players in the group signed with different teams in the 2014–15 off-season. Only Motte, a former closer, had played for the Cardinals prior to 2014. He acceded a one-year contract with the Chicago Cubs. The only free agent who did not endorse with another club was Ellis, who announced his retirement as a player on February 26, 2015.

The Cardinals picked up the 2015 option on starting pitcher John Lackey's contract on October 30, equivalent to the minimum salary of $507,000 ($689,517.1 today), an unusually low number on for a veteran of his achievement level and competitiveness. Acquired from the Boston Red Sox at the trade deadline in 2014, he signed his current contract as a free agent before the 2010 season. The Red Sox inserted a provision in the contract that, in lieu of paying insurance in case he missed any season due to an elbow injury, the club could choose to pick up an option in 2015 for the league minimum salary. At that time, the Red Sox medical staff demonstrated concern that Lackey's elbow was found not to be fully sound during a physical examination. When he missed the 2012 season due to Tommy John surgery, the league-minimum option for 2015 was actuated. The Cardinals added performance bonuses before the start of the season.

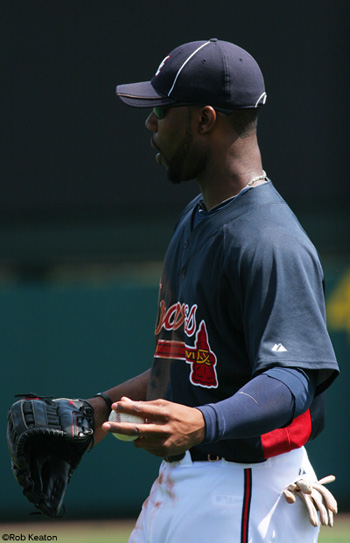
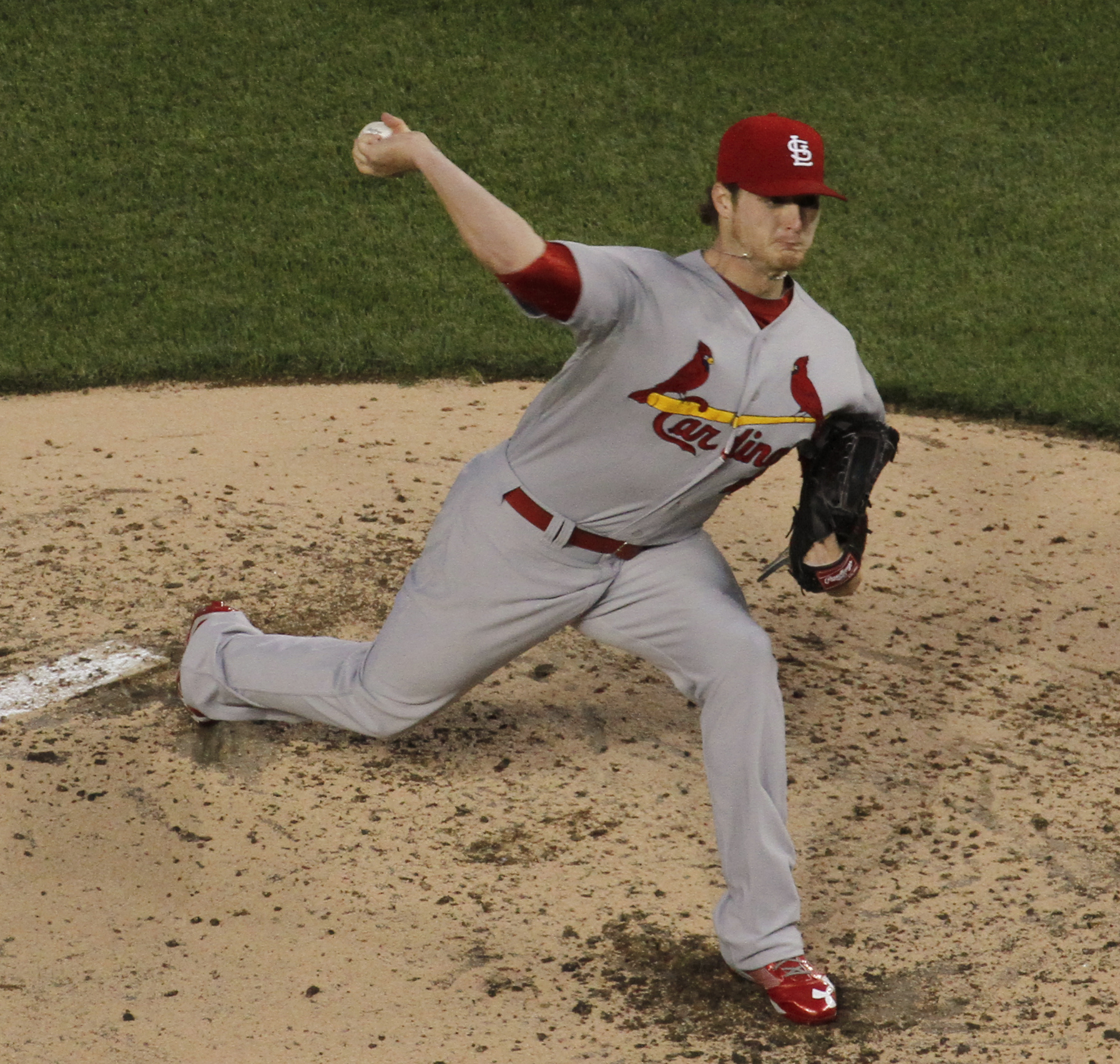
Jason Heyward and Shelby Miller headlined a trade with the Atlanta Braves before the start of the 2015 season.

The Houston Astros appointed longtime scout Charlie González as a special assistant on November 1. Two days later, the Cardinals signed assistant hitting coach David Bell to a two-year contract to replace Aldrete as bench coach. To fill the position Bell vacated, the Cardinals hired former Cubs hitting coach Bill Mueller as assistant hitting coach on November 17.

With a void in right field that emerged following the death of Taveras, the Cardinals settled a surprising blockbuster trade with the Atlanta Braves on November 17. St. Louis arrogated former Baseball America Minor League Player of the Year Jason Heyward and relief pitcher Jordan Walden in exchange for starting pitcher Shelby Miller and reliever Tyrell Jenkins. For the second time in the 2014–15 off-season, the Athletics drew from the Cardinals' staff, hiring director of scouting Dan Kantrovitz to be assistant general manager on November 24. To replace Kantrovitz, director of baseball development Chris Correa was promoted to director of scouting on December 2. One week later, the Missouri Sports Hall of Fame announced former ace Chris Carpenter as an inductee in their 2015 class.

The Cardinals signed free agents relief pitcher Matt Belisle (December 2), from the Colorado Rockies, and first baseman Mark Reynolds (December 11) from the Milwaukee Brewers. They initially imported veteran reliever Carlos Villanueva on a minor league deal in February, but selected him for the major league roster out of spring training.

In March 2015, Forbes appraised the Cardinals' outright value at $1.4 billion, making them the 27th-most valuable sports franchise in the world, and sixth-principal franchise in Major League Baseball (MLB). It was an increase from an $800 million pricing and eighth in the echelon in 2014. Their revenue was $294 million while their operating income was $73.6 million, and their overall assessment was approximately $200 million higher than the MLB average of $1.2 billion. Mike Ozanian of Forbes remarked that the Cardinals were "baseball's biggest anamoly", with outsize value outpacing their status as one of baseball's "smallest markets", and the recently opened Ballpark Village – adjacent to Busch Stadium – was a popular destination for dining and entertainment. The Cardinals' local television ratings (7.76) graded the highest among all major league teams.

=== Acquisitions, departures and roster moves ===
==== Ownership, club officials, managers, and coaches ====
Club officials

Charlie González	Departed St. Louis Cardinals Scout	Hired by Houston Astros Promoted to Special assistant November 1, 2014
Dan Kantrovitz	Departed St. Louis Cardinals Director of scouting	Hired by Oakland Athletics Promoted to Assistant general manager November 24, 2014
Chris Correa	From St. Louis Cardinals Director of baseball development	Remained with St. Louis Cardinals Promoted to Director of scouting December 2, 2014

Managers and coaches

Mike Aldrete	Departed St. Louis Cardinals Bench coach	Hired by Oakland Athletics To Bench coach October 27, 2014
David Bell	From St. Louis Cardinals Assistant hitting coach	Remained with St. Louis Cardinals Promoted to Bench coach November 3, 2014
Bill Mueller	Departed Chicago Cubs Hitting coach	Hired by St. Louis Cardinals To Assistant hitting coach November 17, 2014

==== Players ====
Contract options

October 30, 2014	John Lackey (RHP) $500,000 team option for 2015	St. Louis Cardinals Exercised

Trades

November 17, 2014	To St. Louis Cardinals Jason Heyward (RF) Jordan Walden (RHP)	To Atlanta Braves Tyrell Jenkins (RHP) Shelby Miller (RHP)
November 20, 2014	To St. Louis Cardinals Ty Kelly (IF) (added to the 40-man roster and assigned to the Memphis Redbirds)	To Seattle Mariners Sam Gaviglio (RHP)
February 3, 2015	To St. Louis Cardinals Michael Ohlman (C) (added to the 40-man roster and assigned to the Springfield Cardinals)	To Baltimore Orioles Cash considerations
March 28, 2015	To St. Louis Cardinals Cash considerations or a player to be named later	To Texas Rangers Sam Freeman (LHP)

Major league free agents

Mark Ellis (IF)	Departed St. Louis Cardinals October 30, 2014 Contracts expired after World Series	Retired as a player February 26, 2015
Justin Masterson (RHP)	Departed St. Louis Cardinals October 30, 2014 Contracts expired after World Series	Signed with Boston Red Sox December 12, 2014 1 year, $9.5 million
Jason Motte (RHP)	Departed St. Louis Cardinals October 30, 2014 Contracts expired after World Series	Signed with Chicago Cubs December 15, 2014 1 year, $4.5 million
Pat Neshek (RHP)	Departed St. Louis Cardinals October 30, 2014 Contracts expired after World Series	Signed with Houston Astros December 15, 2014 2 years, $12.5 million
A. J. Pierzynski (C)	Departed St. Louis Cardinals October 30, 2014 Contracts expired after World Series	Signed with Atlanta Braves January 7, 2015 1 year, $2 million
Matt Belisle (RHP)	Departed Colorado Rockies October 30, 2014 Contract expired	Signed with St. Louis Cardinals December 2, 2014 1 year, $3.5 million
Daniel Descalso (IF)	Departed St. Louis Cardinals December 2, 2014 Non-tendered contract as arbitration-eligible player	Signed with Colorado Rockies December 16, 2014 2 years, $3.6 million
Mark Reynolds (1B)	Departed Milwaukee Brewers November 4, 2014 Contract expired	Signed with St. Louis Cardinals December 11, 2014 1 year, $2 million

Minor league free agents

Dean Anna (IF)	Departed Indianapolis Indians AAA affiliate of the Pittsburgh Pirates November 4, 2015	To St. Louis Cardinals Added to 40-man roster Optioned to Memphis Redbirds November 11, 2014
Marcus Hatley (RHP)	Departed Iowa Cubs AAA affiliate of the Chicago Cubs November 4, 2014	To St. Louis Cardinals Signed to minor league contract with invite to spring training November 19, 2014
Miguel Socolovich (RHP)	Departed Las Vegas 51s AAA affiliate of the New York Mets November 4, 2014	To St. Louis Cardinals Signed to minor league contract with invite to spring training November 11, 2014
Shane Robinson (OF)	Released by St. Louis Cardinals November 18, 2014	To Minnesota Twins Signed to minor league contract with invite to spring training December 4, 2014
Carlos Villanueva (RHP)	Departed Chicago Cubs October 30, 2014	To St. Louis Cardinals Signed to minor league contract with invite to spring training February 4, 2015

Arbitration-eligible players

Peter Bourjos (OF)	St. Louis Cardinals Tendered contracts December 2, 2014	Signed $1.65 million, one-year contract January 15, 2015
Troy Cruz (C)	St. Louis Cardinals Tendered contracts December 2, 2014	Signed $775,000, one-year contract January 15, 2015
Jon Jay (OF)	St. Louis Cardinals Tendered contracts December 2, 2014	Signed $10.975 million, two-year contract February 9, 2015
Lance Lynn (RHP)	St. Louis Cardinals Tendered contracts December 2, 2014	Signed $22 million, three-year contract January 15, 2015
Jordan Walden (RHP)	St. Louis Cardinals Tendered contracts December 2, 2014	Signed $6.3 million, two-year contract with team option for year three December 23, 2014
Daniel Descalso (IF)	St. Louis Cardinals Did not tender contract December 2, 2014	Became major league free agent

40-man roster moves

October 26, 2014	Oscar Taveras (OF) Killed in a car accident	Removed from 40-man roster
November 3, 2014	Ed Easley (C) Purchased from AAA Memphis Redbirds	Added to 40-man roster Reassigned to Memphis Redbirds
November 18, 2014	Cody Stanley (C) Purchased from AAA Memphis Redbirds	Added to 40-man roster Reassigned to Memphis Redbirds
November 18, 2014	Keith Butler (RHP) Cleared waivers	Removed from 40-man roster Outrighted to AAA Memphis Redbirds
March 30, 2015	Carlos Villanueva (RHP) Under minor league contract	Signed to major league contract Added to 40- and 25-man roster
April 3, 2015	Two-player move
April 3, 2015	Designated for assignment Jacob Wilson (IF) Cleared waivers and assigned to AA Springfield Cardinals	Claimed off waivers from San Francisco Giants Gary Brown (OF) Added to the 40-man roster

Waiver moves (non-40-man roster)

*November 3, 2014: RHP Eric Fornataro was claimed off waivers by the Washington Nationals.
- November 3, 2014: RHP Jorge Rondón was claimed off waivers by the Colorado Rockies.

Miscellaneous transactions

*November 11, 2014: IF Scott Moore was re-signed by the Cardinals to a minor league contract and extended an invitation to spring training.
- December 11, 2014: RHP Tyler Waldron of the Indianapolis Indians (AAA affiliate of the Pittsburgh Pirates) was signed in the AAA-phase of the Rule 5 draft.

== Season standings ==
=== National League Central ===
NL Central
Team	W	L	Pct.	GB	Home	Road
St. Louis Cardinals	100	62	.617	—	55‍–‍26	45‍–‍36
Pittsburgh Pirates	98	64	.605	2	53‍–‍28	45‍–‍36
Chicago Cubs	97	65	.599	3	49‍–‍32	48‍–‍33
Milwaukee Brewers	68	94	.420	32	34‍–‍47	34‍–‍47
Cincinnati Reds	64	98	.395	36	34‍–‍47	30‍–‍51

=== National League playoff standings ===
Playoff standings

Division leaders
Team	W	L	Pct.
St. Louis Cardinals	100	62	.617
Los Angeles Dodgers	92	70	.568
New York Mets	90	72	.556

Wild Card teams (Top 2 teams qualify for postseason)
Team	W	L	Pct.	GB
Pittsburgh Pirates	98	64	.605	+1
Chicago Cubs	97	65	.599	—
San Francisco Giants	84	78	.519	13
Washington Nationals	83	79	.512	14
Arizona Diamondbacks	79	83	.488	18
San Diego Padres	74	88	.457	23
Miami Marlins	71	91	.438	26
Milwaukee Brewers	68	94	.420	29
Colorado Rockies	68	94	.420	29
Atlanta Braves	67	95	.414	30
Cincinnati Reds	64	98	.395	33
Philadelphia Phillies	63	99	.389	34

=== National League head-to-head records ===
Head-to-head records

2015 National League record Source: MLB Standings Grid – 2015
Team	AZ	ATL	CHC	CIN	COL	LAD	MIA	MIL	NYM	PHI	PIT	SD	SF	STL	WSH	AL
Arizona	—	3–3	2–4	6–1	13–6	6–13	5–2	5–2	2–5	2–4	1–5	9–10	11–8	0–7	3–4	11–9
Atlanta	3–3	—	1–6	3–4	1–6	3–3	10–9	5–2	8–11	11–8	2–4	2–5	3–4	4–2	5–14	6–14
Chicago	4–2	6–1	—	13–6	4–2	3–4	3–3	14–5	7–0	2–5	11–8	3–3	5–2	8–11	4–3	10–10
Cincinnati	1–6	4–3	6–13	—	2–4	1–6	3–4	9–10	0–7	4–2	11–8	2–4	2–5	7–12	5–1	7–13
Colorado	6–13	6–1	2–4	4–2	—	8–11	2–5	5–1	0–7	5–2	1–6	7–12	11–8	3–4	3–3	5–15
Los Angeles	13–6	3–3	4–3	6–1	11–8	—	4–2	4–3	3–4	5–2	1–5	14–5	8–11	2–5	4–2	10–10
Miami	2–5	9–10	3–3	4–3	5–2	2–4	—	4–2	8–11	9–10	1–6	2–5	5–2	1–5	9–10	7–13
Milwaukee	2–5	2–5	5–14	10–9	1–5	3–4	2–4	—	3–3	7–0	10–9	5–2	1–5	6–13	3–4	8–12
New York	5–2	11–8	0–7	7–0	7–0	4–3	11–8	3–3	—	14–5	0–6	2–4	3–3	3–4	11–8	9–11
Philadelphia	4–2	8–11	5–2	2–4	2–5	2–5	10–9	0–7	5–14	—	2–5	5–1	1–5	2–5	7–12	8–12
Pittsburgh	5–1	4–2	8–11	8–11	6–1	5–1	6–1	9–10	6–0	5–2	—	5–2	6–1	9–10	3–4	13–7
San Diego	10–9	5–2	3–3	4–2	12–7	5–14	5–2	2–5	4–2	1–5	2–5	—	8–11	4–3	2–5	7–13
San Francisco	8–11	4–3	2–5	5–2	8–11	11–8	2–5	5–1	3–3	5–1	1–6	11–8	—	2–4	4–3	13–7
St. Louis	7–0	2–4	11–8	12–7	4–3	5–2	5–1	13–6	4–3	5–2	10–9	3–4	4–2	—	4–2	11–9
Washington	4–3	14–5	3–4	1–5	3–3	2–4	10–9	4–3	8–11	12–7	4–3	5–2	3–4	2–4	—	8–12

== Regular season summary ==
=== April ===
==== First-ever MLB Opening Night ====
For the first time in his career, 23-year-old Carlos Martínez made the Cardinals starting rotation, earning the fifth starter spot out of spring training. Participating in the first-ever night game Opening Day to commence an MLB season, the Cardinals faced off against the Chicago Cubs on April 5, partners in an historic sports rivalry. Also dubbed "Opening Night", Adam Wainwright made his fourth career Opening Day start. St. Louis, in turn, made team history as they won 3–0. Their four stolen bases (SB) set a team record for Opening Day, and Yadier Molina became the first catcher in club history with 11 consecutive Opening Day starts. Right fielder Jason Heyward debuted for the Cardinals in this game, garnering three hits, including two doubles, and a stolen base. Left fielder Matt Holliday opened the season with a 12-game hitting streak. His 12th game was also his first four-hit performance of the season.

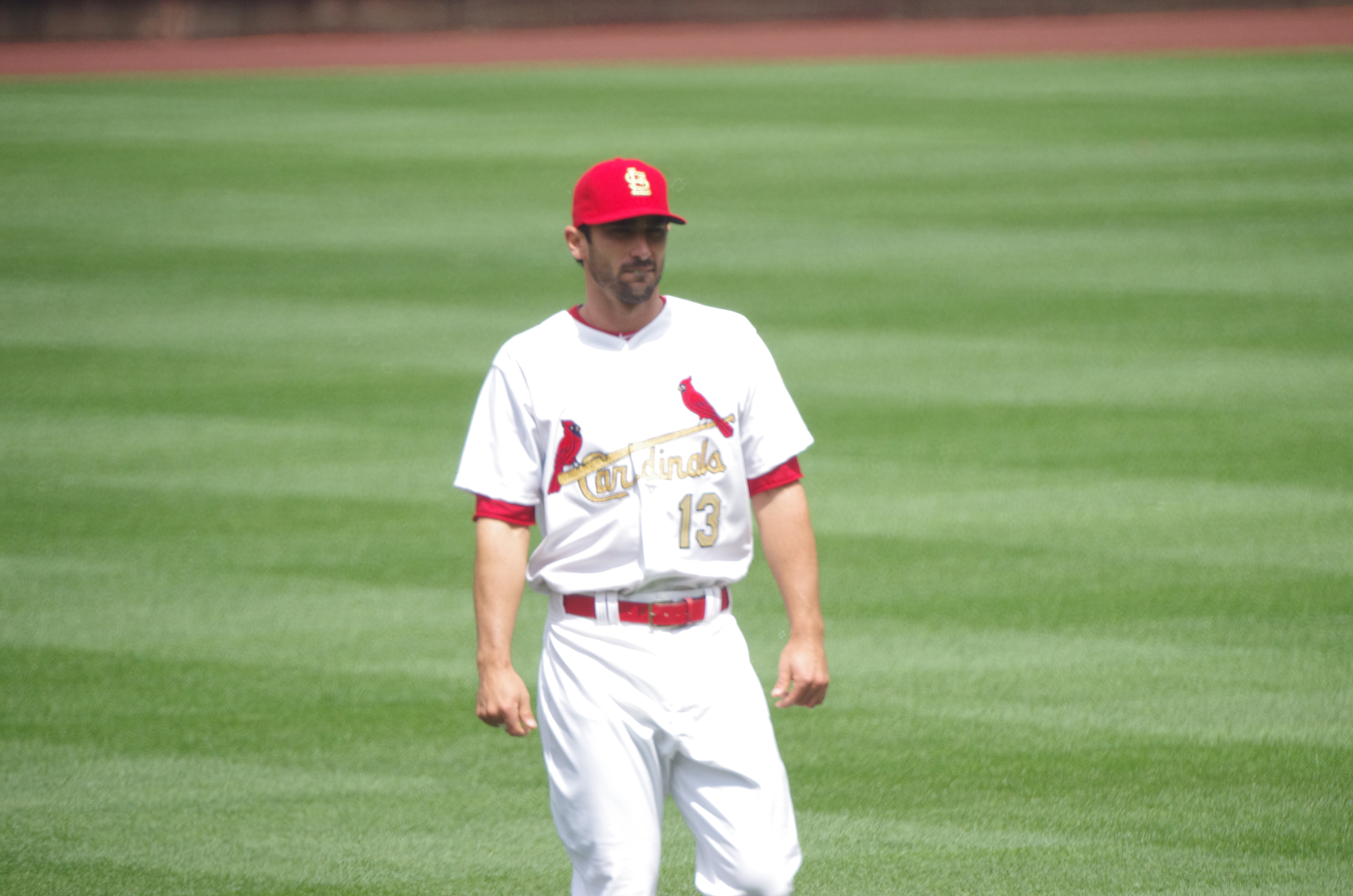
Matt Carpenter was named the National League Player of the Week on April 19.

Opening Night starting lineup
at Wrigley Field, April 5, 2015
defeated CHC, 3–0
No.	Name	Pos.
13	Matt Carpenter	3B
22	Jason Heyward	RF
7	Matt Holliday	LF
27	Jhonny Peralta	SS
32	Matt Adams	1B
4	Yadier Molina	C
16	Kolten Wong	2B
19	Jon Jay	CF
50	Adam Wainwright	P

==== Matt Carpenter's doubles in seven consecutive games ====
From April 12–19, third baseman Matt Carpenter netted seven consecutive games with at least two hits and one double, tying Ripper Collins for the franchise record he set in 1935. That same streak was also the longest in the Major Leagues since Paul Molitor achieve the same as a member of the Brewers in 1991. Carpenter also batted .480 with an .880 slugging percentage (SLG), seven doubles, one home run (HR), five runs batted in (RBI) and an-NL leading 22 total bases. MLB subsequently named him to his first NL Player of the Week Award for that period.

Making his 99th career start on April 15, starter Lance Lynn earned his 50th career win in a 4–2 victory over Milwaukee. It was his 13th win in the month of April since 2012, the highest total in MLB. Setup man Kevin Siegrist earned his first major league save by pitching the last two innings of a 6−1 win against the Reds on April 17. Heyward hit his first home run as a Cardinal on April 18 against the Cincinnati Reds at Busch Stadium.

==== Harris first Naval Academy graduate in MLB in 94 years, Wainwright out for season ====
The club placed OF Peter Bourjos on three-day paternity leave on April 21, replacing him on the 25-man roster with RHP Mitch Harris. Harris was the first United States Naval Academy graduate to be called up to the majors since pitcher Nemo Gaines of the Washington Senators in 1921. On April 25, Harris made his major-league debut, substituting for Wainwright in a game against Milwaukee after he suffered an ankle injury, and struck out his first batter, Adam Lind. Catcher Cody Stanley, who replaced Wainwright on the 25-man roster, got a hit in his first major league at bat. The Cardinals announced that Wainwright had an Achilles tendon rupture and would likely miss the remainder of the season.

Left-handed pitcher (LHP) Tim Cooney took Wainwright's next spot in the rotation. It was his major league debut, but was a disappointment, going only 2 1/3 innings and giving up seven hits and a walk. The following day, the Cardinals called up RHP Miguel Socolovich and sent down Cooney. To make room on the 40-man roster, OF Tommy Pham was moved to the 60-day disabled list. Through his first four starts of the season, Martínez' ERA was 1.89. Through the month of April, Holliday maintained an MLB-best .500 OBP.

=== May ===
==== Sweep of each game of home series with walk-off hits ====
The month of May increased the trend of rare achievements for the Cardinals. In the May 1–3 series at home against the Pittsburgh Pirates, the Cardinals won each game in extra innings. In the last game of that series, Kolten Wong hit his second career regular-season walk-off home run; his first also occurred against the Pirates. St. Louis became the first team since 1925 to sweep by winning each game in extra innings when the Cincinnati Reds did so against the Boston Braves from June 4–7. As the games were at Busch Stadium, St. Louis each won in walk-off fashion: first baseman Matt Adams with a bases-loaded single in the first game, and Carpenter with a sacrifice fly in the second.

==== Best 25-game start since at least 1900 ====
Miguel Socolovich made his Cardinals debut on May 3 against the Reds, completing one inning with a strikeout and no hits or walks. Setup man Jordan Walden went on the DL on May 3 because of a biceps injury, and it changed manager Mike Matheny's bullpen strategy by using his most capable relief pitchers more, including closer Trevor Rosenthal, setup man Matt Belisle and middle reliever Seth Maness. Each were either injured or because less effective later in the season. Kevin Siegrist, who originally filled the seventh inning, moved to the eight-inning setup role, leaving a hollow in the seventh inning.

The Cardinals defeated the Cubs on May 4 for their seventh straight win, making their record on the season an MLB-best 19–6. It was their best start after 25 games since at least 1900. In that contest, Mark Reynolds hit his fourth career grand slam in the 10–9 score. Despite getting a no-decision, Martínez allowed seven of the nine runs in this game. In the next game, also against the Cubs, Reynolds' pinch-hit double drove in the go-ahead runs as the Cardinals were victorious, 7–4.

The Cardinals called LHP Tyler Lyons up from Memphis to take Wainwright's next turn in the rotation on May 5. Lyons completed 4 1/3 innings with seven strikeouts, two walks, six hits, and four runs (three earned). In 7 2/3 IP against the Cubs on May 7, RHP John Lackey struck out 10. He also drove in his third career run with a double, his third career extra base hit in a 5–1 win.

==== Flood, Forsch, Kissell and Simmons announced as new Cardinals Hall of Fame inductees ====
Four new members of the St. Louis Cardinals Hall of Fame Museum were announced on May 5, including Curt Flood, Bob Forsch, George Kissell and Ted Simmons. In 12 seasons with St. Louis, center fielder Flood won seven Gold Gloves, was a three-time All-Star, and a member of the 1964 and 1967 championship clubs. However, Flood is best known for challenging the reserve clause, which in spite of the United States Supreme Court ruling in MLB's favor, eventually led to free agency. Forsch, the only pitcher in franchise history to throw two no-hitters, ranked third with 163 wins and second with 401 starts. Kissell spent 65 years in the Cardinals organization as a minor league player, manager, scout and instructor. Simmons, a catcher, played 13 years in St. Louis, was a six-time All-Star, and set the National League record for hits (188) by a catcher in 1975. He batted .298 with 172 HR and 929 RBI as Cardinal.

==== Molina hit into first-ever 4–5–4 triple play in MLB ====
In the next series against the Pirates on May 9, Martínez continued to struggle as he allowed 14 runs on 16 hits and 11 walks including the previous two starts totaling nine innings. His ERA jumped from 1.89 from before the previous start against the Cubs to 4.73 after the start against the Pirates. The next day, the Cardinals fell victim to the first "4–5–4" triple play (where the second baseman records the out, throws to the third baseman, who records a second out, and finally back to the second baseman, who records a third and final out of the inning, all in one play) in MLB history. In this play, Molina lined out to Pittsburgh second baseman Neil Walker, who threw to third baseman Jung-ho Kang to double up Jhonny Peralta for the second out. Kang briefly pirouetted the ball in his hand, albeit confused, then threw back to Walker to tag Jason Heyward for the final out.

==== Cardinals batters struck out record 18 times ====
Reigning American League Cy Young Award winner Corey Kluber of the Cleveland Indians struck out 18 Cardinals on May 13, setting a record for a Cardinal opponent and tying Bob Feller for the Indians' nine-inning franchise record in Cleveland's 2–0 win. After striking out five times on May 18, Grichuk followed up with two doubles and a triple the next night against the New York Mets as the Cardinals prevailed 10–2. A 3–1 victory over the Detroit Tigers on May 17 gave Mike Matheny his 300th win as manager. Jaime García, reactivated from the 60-day disabled list for a start against the Mets on May 21, made his first MLB appearance in nearly one year. He completed seven innings but received the loss, allowing five hits, two runs (both earned), five walks, and striking out three.

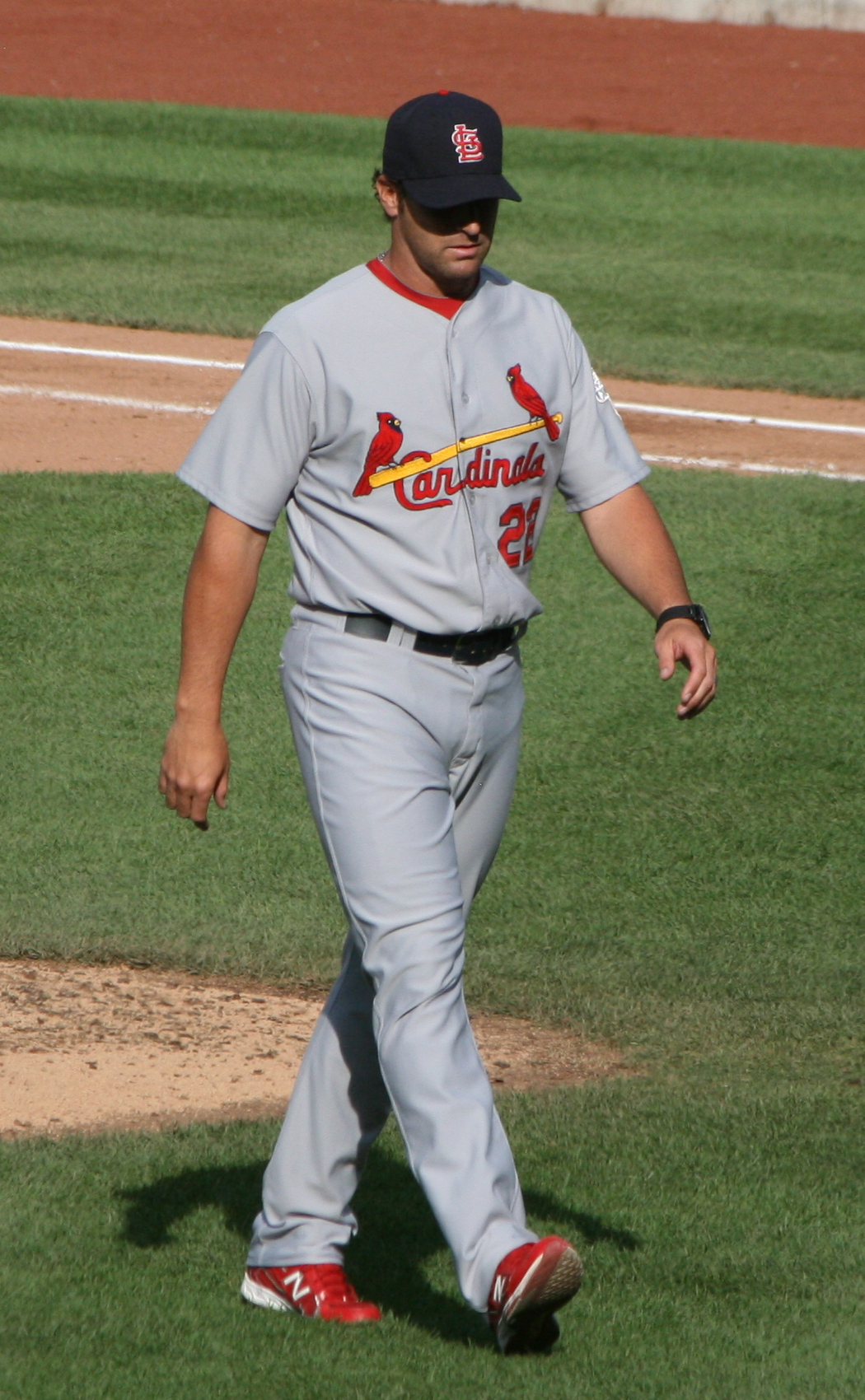
Mike Matheny guided the Cardinals to his 300th win while managing on May 17 against Detroit.

The Cardinals won each of Michael Wacha's first nine starts while he received the win in seven of them. That ninth game spanned through May 24 against the Kansas City Royals. His ERA was 1.87. Wacha was the first Cardinal pitcher to start with a 7–0 record since Matt Morris started 8–0 in 2005. Matt Carpenter homered for his 500th career hit and 300th career run scored. On May 25, Jhonny Peralta hit a walk-off home run in the tenth inning against the Arizona Diamondbacks, his seventh home run of the season. García's first win in nearly a year was on May 26 against the Diamondbacks, in which worked six innings in a 6–4 victory.

==== Matt Holliday's record on-base streak ====
Holliday reached base each of his first 43 games of the season through May 27 against the Diamondbacks, breaking Albert Pujols' franchise and National League records, which he set in 2008. Holliday had also reached base in 45 consecutive games dating back to 2014, which was 10 short of Stan Musial's overall franchise record, and 29 short of Ted Williams' MLB record. Heyward's home run in the ninth inning that game tied the game at 3–3, and the Cardinals eventually won, 4–3. IF Matt Adams was placed on the 15-day disabled list May 28 with a torn right quadriceps and replaced on the 25-man roster with C Ed Easley. He had surgery May 29 and was expected to miss three to four months, effectively the rest of the season.

==== Tribute to Taveras ====
On May 31, the Cardinals paid an official tribute to the deceased Oscar Taveras, who debuted for them in the major leagues exactly one year earlier. They played the Los Angeles Dodgers that day. Martínez, the Cardinals starting pitcher and close of friend of Taveras, struck out eight and extended a personal scoreless inning streak to 20 1/3 innings as St. Louis prevailed, 3–1. It was the longest scoreless-inning streak in the NL for a starting pitcher through that point in the season.

Through their first 50 games and two of the months of the season, the Cardinals were an MLB-best 33–17 (.660 winning percentage), including 20–6 at home. They produced the best run differential at plus-60 and were the only team with a staff ERA lower than 3.00, at 2.73. The bullpen had a 2.21 ERA. The offense produced a seventh-best .737 on-base plus slugging percentage (OPS).

=== June ===
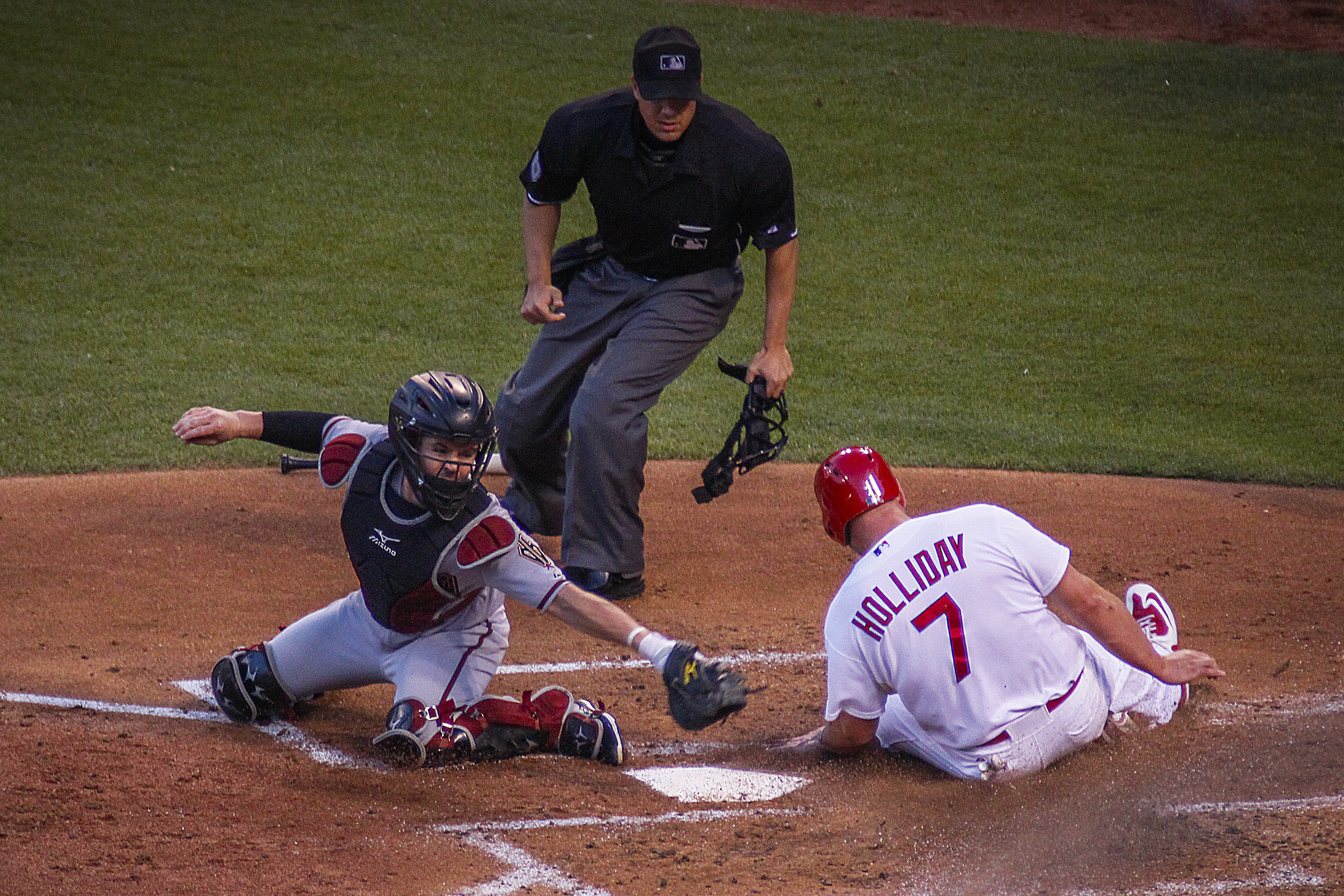
Matt Holliday set the National League record for reaching base in the most consecutive games to start a season with 45.

In his third start of the season on June 1 against the Milwaukee Brewers, García logged seven innings, while allowing one run and striking out four with less than 90 pitches. However, he ended up with a 1–0 loss, bringing his record for the season to 1–2 with a 2.70 ERA. In his time with the Cardinals through June 1, Peralta ranked first in extra-base hits (80) and home runs (29), third in RBI (101), second in slugging percentage (.461) and OPS (.804) and fourth in on-base percentage (.361) among MLB shortstops. On defense, although he did not rely on heavily on range, but on smart positioning and making the routine plays, qualifying him for +1 defensive runs saved after saving 17 the year before. Holliday's National League-record on-base streak to start the season ended at 45 games – 47 overall – on June 2 against the Brewers in a 1–0 win. Umpire Joe West ejected him for arguing a called third strike in the seventh inning, and also ejected manager Mike Matheny, who had joined the argument. It was the longest such streak in the major leagues since Derek Jeter garnered 53 in 1999.

==== Holliday, the second Cardinal of the season with a torn quadriceps muscle ====
Martínez' next start, also against the Dodgers, came on June 5. Over seven innings, he gave up just one run on three hits and struck out 11, a new career high, in a 2–1 victory. By giving up the run in the second inning, the scoreless inning streak stopped at 21 2/3, also a career-high. On June 8, Holliday suffered a right quadriceps strain while attempting to catch a fly ball off the bat of Carlos González during a game against the Colorado Rockies. The Cardinals placed Holliday on the 15-day DL, and recalled Socolovich to take his place on the roster. At the time, Holliday was batting .303 with three HR and 26 RBI, and was third overall in the NL All-Star balloting. He was second among outfielders to Bryce Harper of the Washington Nationals, which would translate as a spot as a starting outfielder in the All-Star Game if that placement held for the final vote tally. In the MLB draft, the Cardinals selected outfielder Nick Plummer with the 23rd overall and team's number-one pick from Brother Rice High School in Michigan. In a June 12 start against the Royals, Jaime García netted his 500th career strikeout by getting Omar Infante as the Cardinals won 4–0. It was García's 102nd career start; he had also not issued a walk in his first 30 IP of the season.

Lyons, whom the Cardinals recalled from Memphis to take the place of an injured Lance Lynn on June 13, stopped a winless streak of 13 MLB starts by pitching a 3–2 victory over the Royals. He struck out five in six innings. Closer Trevor Rosenthal strung together a 17 2/3 scoreless inning streak while saving his NL-leading 21st game of the season. The Cardinals' first back-to-back home runs of the season occurred on June 15 against the Twins, which Molina and Reynolds accomplished. It was Molina's first home run of the season and first in 95 games, dating back to June 27, 2014. The Cardinals' previous back-to-back home runs occurred when Holliday and Grichuk delivered against the Reds on September 19, 2014.

==== First alleged case of cyber espionage in professional sports ====
Reports surfaced on June 16 that the Federal Bureau of Investigation (FBI) were reviewing an alleged incident involving Cardinals' front office officials hacking into the Houston Astros' database of players, scouting reports and proprietary statistics. It was regarded as the first known case of corporate espionage involving computer network hacking in professional sports.

==== Rookies Grichuk, Garcia and Scruggs help deliver wins ====
In his first major league action of 2015, second baseman Greg Garcia collected two hits in 12–4 win over the Philadelphia Phillies on June 19. Molina, Wong and Grichuk all homered as Lyons earned his second win of the season. At the plate, Lyons collected both his first major league run batted in and base on balls and while hitting two singles. He reached base and scored in all three plate appearances. Garcia and IF Xavier Scruggs had been called up from Memphis on June 19 in preparation for the series against the Phillies, with Harris and Easley optioned back to the AAA club. The Cardinals were also victorious the next game by a 10–1 score. Grichuk followed with a two more home runs and his second consecutive three-hit game. Heyward also contributed three hits and two RBI. Lackey, the Cardinals' starting pitcher, completed seven innings, for the fourth time in five starts. He improved his record to 6–4 with a 3.41 ERA.

Scruggs provided three hits and two RBI, Heyward hit his eighth home run, and Reynolds drove in the go-ahead run with a bases-loaded infield single on June 23 against the Miami Marlins in a 4–3 win. The Cardinals activated Lynn from the DL the next day prior to the series finale against the Marlins. Heyward homered again the next game, and Wong hit his ninth HR as García improved to 3–3 in a 6–1 victory and series win over the Marlins. The Cardinals optioned Lyons back to Memphis to make room on the roster for Lynn, who started the next game against the Marlins, pitching six scoreless innings in a 5–1 victory and series sweep. Wong's RBI double broke a scoreless tie and put the Cardinals ahead for good. Pete Kozma, filling in for Peralta at shortstop, scored on that double had three hits and reached base in four plate appearances, snapping an 0–21 streak that dated back to May 19.

Greg Garcia's first major league home was on June 26 in the eighth inning against Pedro Strop of the Cubs, tying the score in an eventual 4–3 Cardinals win, where they walked off when Bourjos scored on an error in the 10th inning. The Cardinals improved to an MLB-best 27–7 at home.

==== Best start in MLB in ten years ====
The Cardinals won their fifth straight game on June 27 by a score of 8–1, also at home against the Cubs, extending their major league-best record to 50–24. Scruggs provided another three-hit night as all nine starters collected at least one hit. Wacha improved to 10–3 and Carlos Villanueva pitched the last three innings for his first save of the season and fourth career with three or more innings pitched. Each of the second, third and fourth innings with the Cubs batting ended with a double play.

The Cardinals became the first club of the season to reach 50 wins and the fastest to win 50 since the Chicago White Sox in 2005. In the last 50 years, the 2015 Cardinals were just the 18th club to reach 50 wins before losing their 25th game, of which, 13 went on to win 100 or more games and only two missed the playoffs. The only other time in Cardinals' history with such a start or better occurred in 1944 (52–21–2), a season that concluded with 105 regular-season wins and the World Series title. The 2015 club held the major leagues' best run-differential at +95, and their staff ERA (2.63) was the lowest through 74 games in a season since the Baltimore Orioles in 1972 (2.31).

==== Wacha and Martínez both with nine wins before July ====
Winning again against the Cubs on June 28, the Cardinals swept as Martínez won his ninth decision. Thus he and Wacha were the first teammate duo aged 23 and under to win nine games or more in their team's first 75 since Dwight Gooden and Sid Fernandez did so with the Mets in 1986. On June 30 against the Chicago White Sox, the Cardinals again fell victim to a strikeout record against an American League Central pitcher. By striking out 12 Cardinals hitters, Chris Sale matched Pedro Martínez with 10 or more strikeouts in each of eight consecutive games, which Martínez accomplished in 1999. The Cardinals fell to the White Sox, 2–1, in extra innings for just their second loss at home of the month. Grichuk hit a 448 feet (137 m) home run off Sale into the Big Mac Land section, the longest home run of the year at Busch Stadium by a Cardinals player through that point. The bullpen finished with an MLB-best 1.52 ERA for the month of June.

=== July ===
==== Dismissal of Correa for unauthorized access ====
On July 2, news reports including those by the St. Louis Post-Dispatch indicated that the Cardinals had dismissed scouting director Chris Correa after he had admitted to illegally accessing the Astros' scouting database in 2013.

On January 8, 2016, Correa pleaded guilty in federal court to five counts of unauthorized access to a protected computer from at least March 2013 through June 2014. Officials in MLB's commissioner's office said they will review the results of the federal investigation and determine if and when any penalties will be assessed against the Cardinals.

==== End of Rosenthal's scoreless streak ====
Trevor Rosenthal's 23 2/3 IP scoreless streak ended on July 3 against the San Diego Padres. Jedd Gyorko singled home the go-ahead run in the ninth to send the Cardinals to their fourth consecutive loss. Rosenthal's streak, which dated back to May 5, was the longest among relief pitchers in the National League to that point in the season. The Cardinals recalled Harris and optioned Greg Garcia back to Memphis on July 4.

==== Pham's first MLB double and home run help win two games ====
On July 4, the Cardinals defeated the Padres 2–1 as center fielder Tommy Pham, just recalled from Memphis, was influential in helping snap the four-game losing streak. He doubled for his first major league hit, then, later in the game, pilfered his first stolen base and scored the winning run. The next game, Pham hit his first major league home run and drove in his first major league runs, driving in all three runs in a 3–1 victory and propelling the Cardinals to the series split with the Padres. The Cardinals placed Jaime García with a right groin strain and recalled Cooney from Memphis. García sustained the injury on June 24 while running the bases against Miami.

==== Six selected for All-Star Game ====
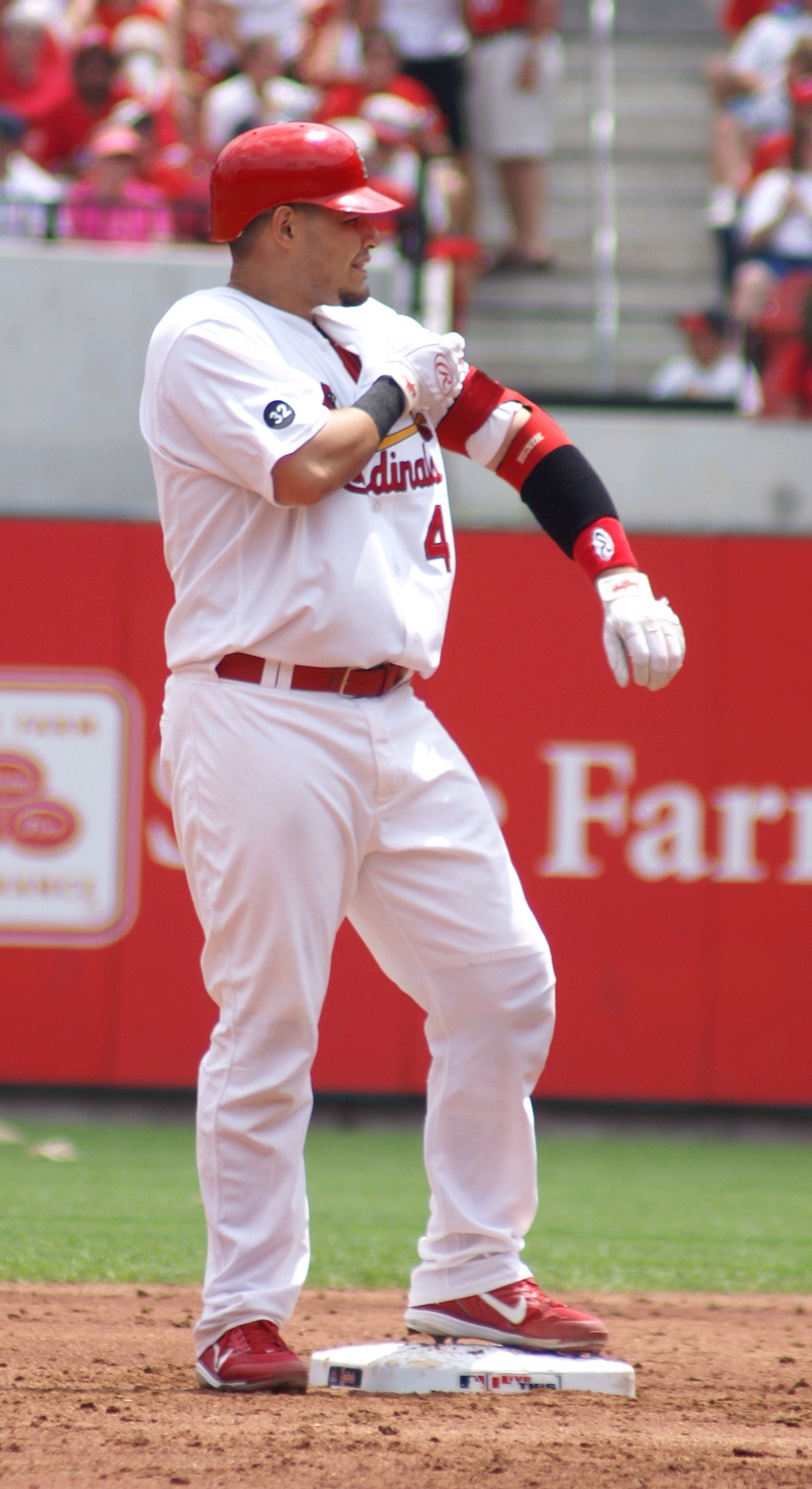
Yadier Molina was selected for his seventh consecutive All-Star game in 2015.

Six Cardinals were selected to compete for the National League All-Star team in the 86th All-Star Game at Great American Ball Park in Cincinnati, including Matt Holliday, Carlos Martínez, Yadier Molina, Jhonny Peralta, Trevor Rosenthal and Michael Wacha. Peralta and Holliday were voted to start the game by fan vote on July 6. Peralta garnered the most votes among NL shortstops, while Holliday placed third among NL outfielders, which automatically assured him one three starting outfield spots. Molina and Rosenthal were selected by fellow players on July 7; NL manager Bruce Bochy also selected Wacha that day. Additionally, Martínez was nominated as a contender for the All-Star Final Vote, which he won on July 10 for was his first All-Star selection.

Although it was Holliday's seventh All-Star selection, it was first time he was selected by fan vote, and thus, as a starter. He was held out of participating due to the quadriceps injury. Peralta made his third All-Star team and first playing for the National League. Molina was selected for his seventh appearance, and Rosenthal and Wacha were both selected for the first time. Through July 10, Martínez completed 107 1/3 innings and notched a 10–3 record with a 2.52 ERA. Over his previous 10 outings, his totals included 10 consecutive quality starts with a 1.20 ERA and 7–1 W–L. Rosenthal elected not to play due to a sore arm.

In the Reds' clubhouse for the All-Star Game, Molina was assigned the locker of second baseman Brandon Phillips. A rift had developed between the two in 2010 when Phillips called the Cardinals a derogatory name to the press, and an altercation between them during one of Phillips' at bats the following game ignited a bench-clearing brawl. Since then, the two mended their schism, and Molina has a photograph of their two families together. When informed with whom he shared, Molina replied, "This is Phillips' locker? How about that? I'll have to write something to him."

While the pregame roster introductions were made, Reds fans booed all six Cardinals players, and even former Cardinal Albert Pujols. When Molina was introduced, the booing reached a crescendo, and he smiled and turned and pointed his thumbs toward the back of his jersey. Pujols provided levity when he then joined in the booing. After the game, Molina remarked to reporters, "when you spend 12 years coming to Cincinnati and you beat them so many times, they're going to boo you." In his career to that point, he hit .319 with a .352 on-base percentage and .500 slugging percentage in 270 career at-bats at Great American Ball Park.

==== Pirates' three straight wins over Cardinals to end first half ====
In the morning of July 12, the Cardinals dropped their second straight game (that had started the night before) to the second place Pirates, after Andrew McCutchen hit a walk off home run off Nick Greenwood in the bottom of the 14th inning. Earlier in this game, Mark Reynolds hit his first multiple home run game of the season – and 22nd of his career – while John Lackey delivered his sixth straight quality start, and 12th in 15 outings. The next game ended with a 6–5 extra-inning defeat of the Cardinals, this time in the bottom of the tenth inning. The loss shrunk the Central division-leading Cardinals' lead over the Pirates to 2 1/2 games; it was also the Pirates' third consecutive victory over the Cardinals in as many days. Gregory Polanco's bases loaded single in the bottom of the tenth off Rosenthal gave the Pirates the win. Rosenthal's first blown save since May 3, it stopped a streak of 18 consecutive conversions. This match was the tenth meeting between the two clubs to this point in the season, of which they had split evenly, and the fifth to go into extra innings.

Despite withstanding both a three-game and four-game losing streak within their previous 14 games, the Cardinals entered the All-Star break with the best record in the major leagues at 56–33. According to STATS LLC, St. Louis abdicated a 2.71 ERA, the leading at-the-break ERA in the majors since the 1981 Astros allowed a 2.81 ERA. Between Lackey, Lynn, Martínez, and Wacha – the four with the most starts – their unified ERA was 2.84, the top figure for the club since 1968, the season of Bob Gibson's 1.12 ERA. Their record at Busch Stadium was 31–11 for a .738 winning percentage, the highest in the major leagues. They also had a 2.31 ERA at home.

==== Start of second half ====
On July 18, the Cardinals defeated the Mets 12–2 behind Lackey's seven innings and one run performance, Heyward's five hits and Grichuk's six RBI. Through his previous seven starts, Lackey's ERA was 1.63. Grichuk also had two home runs in the game, and a seven-game hitting streak, with 13 hits in 25 at bats (.520). It was his first six-RBI game. Heyward's five hits were his first in a game in two years. In the last game of the series, the Mets defeated the Cardinals 3–1 in 18 innings, in spite of stranding 25 runners, which tied their franchise record set in 1974. The game lasted five hours and 55 minutes.

Matt Holliday's first home run in his return from the disabled list was a grand slam against Carlos Rodon of the Chicago White Sox in an 8–5 win on July 21. It was his sixth career grand slam. Stephen Piscotty, appearing in his first major league game, singled in his second at bat for his first MLB hit. In the next game, also against the White Sox, Piscotty hit his first career double. With the bases loaded, Molina hit his first triple since 2011 and in more than 2,000 at bats. This triple provided the decisive run in a 3–2 outcome and made the Cardinals the first team of the season to 60 wins.

Cooney earned his first major league win by pitching a career-high seven innings in a 4−2 win over the Atlanta Braves on July 24. He had previously received no-decisions in each of his first five major league starts. Further, Cooney had a 12-inning scoreless streak that ended in the sixth inning. Grichuk hit a two-run home run, and, setup man Kevin Siegrist, filling in for closer Trevor Rosenthal, recorded his fifth save of the season. On July 25, Martínez pitched his 11th consecutive quality start, tying him with Clayton Kershaw of the Dodgers for longest current streak, and the longest for the Cardinals since Chris Carpenter in 2010. Piscotty's sacrifice fly scored Kozma and was the only run of the game, giving the Cardinals a 1–0 win. It was Piscotty's first MLB RBI.

Kolten Wong's second career grand slam provided the margin in a 4–1 win over the Reds on July 27. The Reds then shut out the Cardinals on consecutive days. Holliday reaggravated the quadriceps injury on July 29 that he had sustained the month prior, and was placed on the 15-day DL. Lackey gave up just one run with eight strikeouts while allowing one walk and two hits. It was the fewest hits he allowed through that point in the season. He also allowed three runs or fewer in all but of one of his prior 17 starts.

However, the Cardinals' offense returned the following night (July 30) in a 9–8 home victory over the Colorado Rockies. After slumping to a .216 batting average over three months since being moved down in the order, Matt Carpenter returned to the lead off position for his first career multi-home run game. He also had four hits, four runs scored and four RBI. The game involved multiple lead changes, poor fundamental play and angry exchanges between the two clubs. Starting pitcher Carlos Martínez hit DJ LeMahieu with a pitch in the fifth inning; when the inning was completed, Martínez flashed an obscene gesture on full public display toward the visitors' dugout with Rockies players and personnel. Corresponding aggressive verbal exchanges ensued, including those between Molina and Nolan Arenado. In the seventh inning, Rockies pitcher Christian Friedrich hit Kolten Wong. The umpires issued warnings in the fifth inning but no ejections followed. Kevin Siegrist committed two throwing errors in the eighth inning involving Rockies baserunners, that, along with Randal Grichuk's throwing mistakes from center field (not officially ruled as errors), allowed Colorado to take an 8–6 lead. The Cardinals came back in the bottom of the ninth, winning on Greg Garcia's bases loaded walk-off walk. Carpenter was again instrumental, starting the rally with a ground rule double. Jhonny Peralta later delivered a game-tying two-run single before the Cardinals loaded the bases and Garcia drew the decisive walk. Martínez' streak of 11 quality starts ended with this game after allowing five runs in five innings.

==== Non-waiver trade deadline acquisitions ====
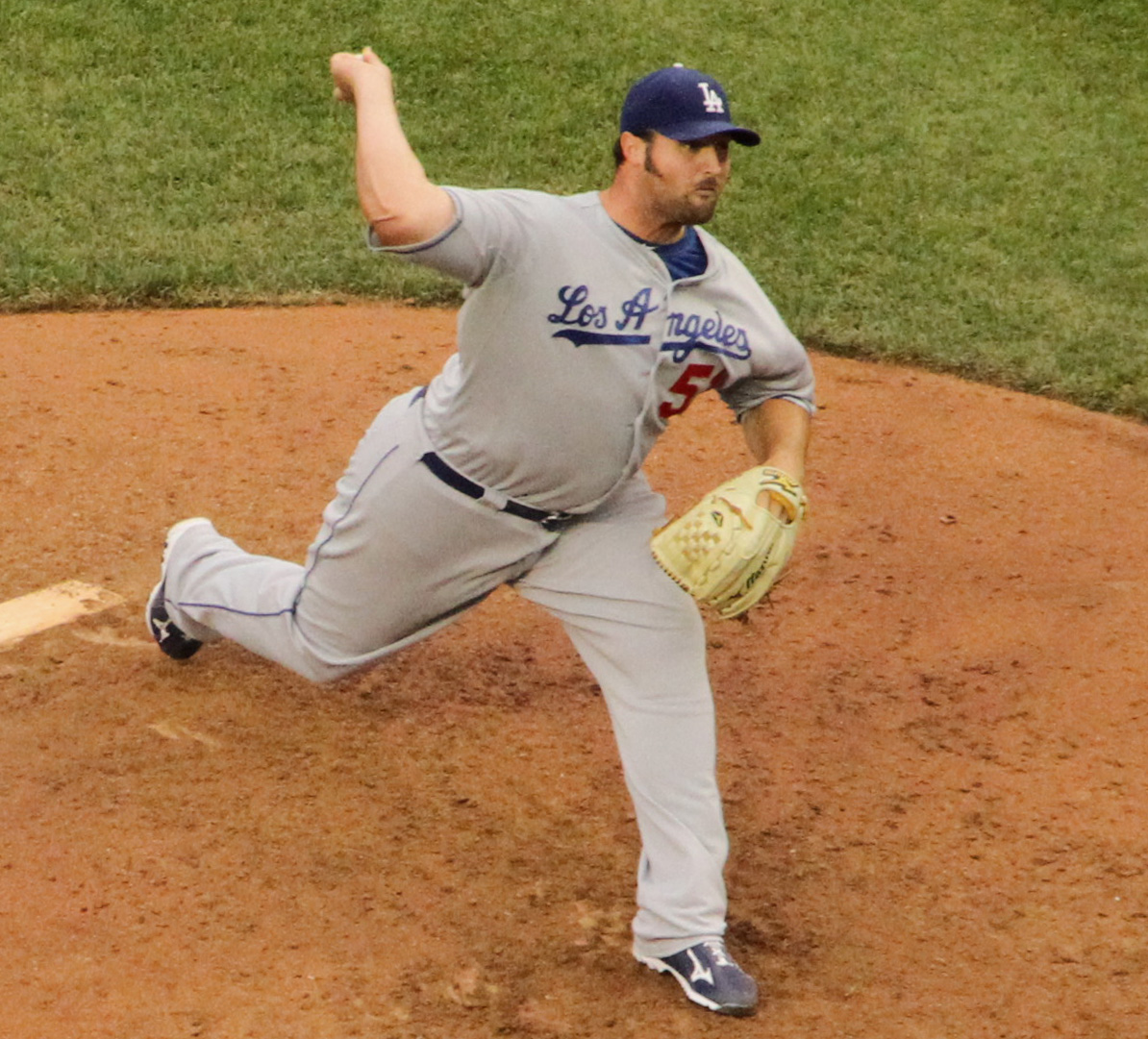
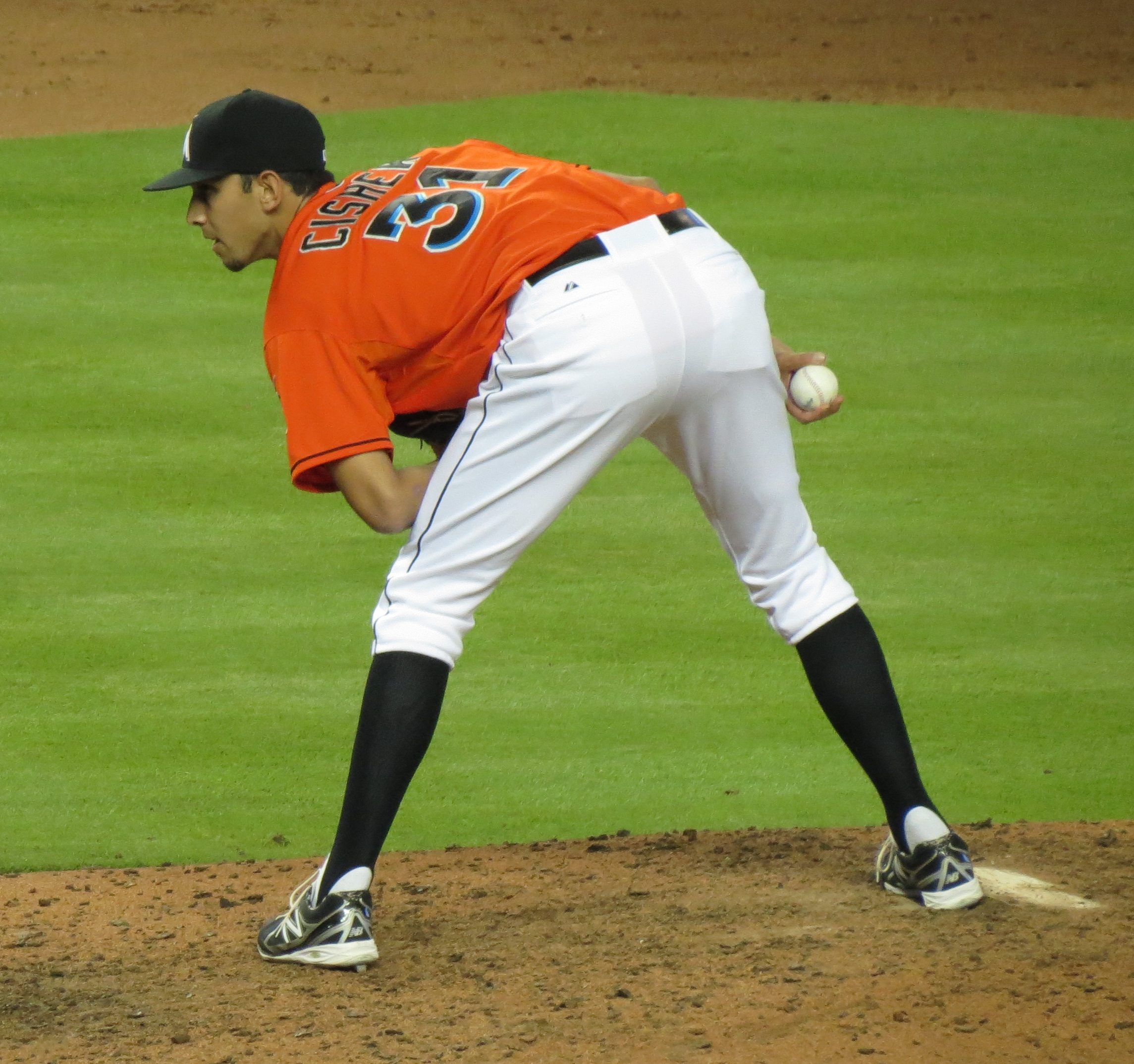
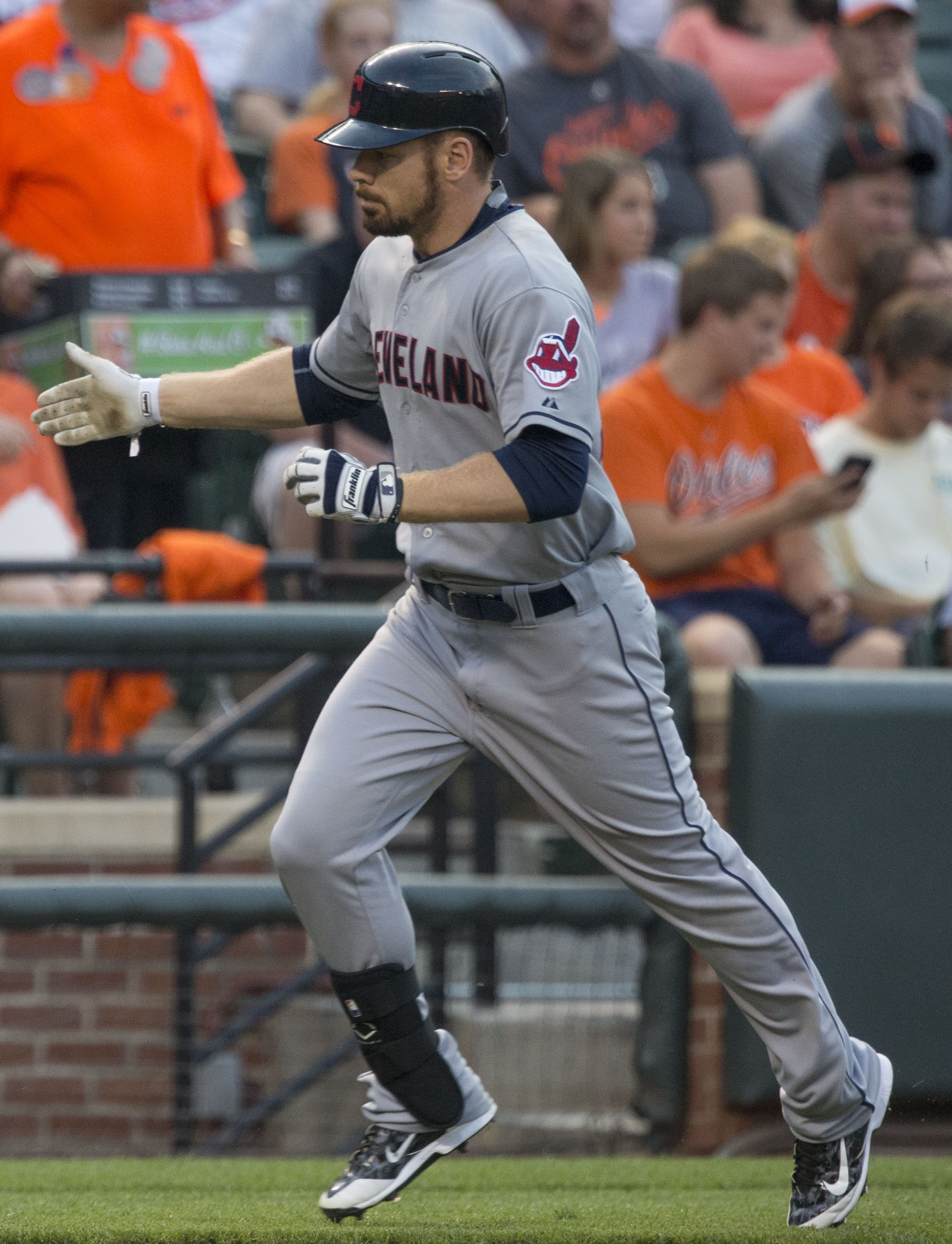
The Cardinals augmented their bullpen by adding former closers Jonathan Broxton and Steven Cishek and their lineup with Brandon Moss before the July 31 trade deadline. Cishek and Broxton were the fourth and fifth pitchers with at least 30 saves in one season to play for the Cardinals in 2015.

To help offset the loss of batting production from Holliday's return to the DL, the Cardinals acquired first baseman and outfielder Brandon Moss from the Indians for LHP Rob Kaminsky. The following day, the Cardinals acquired another former closer in Jonathan Broxton, who was Milwaukee's setup man. The Brewers also sent cash, as the pitcher's 2015 salary was $9 million ($12,239,949.4 today), and he would have been arbitration eligible in 2016 with a $2 million ($2,719,988.8 today) buyout. The Cardinals sent outfielder Malik Collymore (minors, not on 40-man roster) to the Brewers.

On July 30, it was announced the Cardinals had agreed to a new television deal with Fox Sports Midwest. It was an extension of the current deal, which would expire at the end of the 2017 season. The new deal would extend through 2032 and be worth $1 billion overall. It also guaranteed the franchise a minority stake in the network. The Cardinals' current deal would have been worth about $35 million in its final year, then climb to roughly $55 million in 2018, increasing with inflation each year afterward.

=== August ===
Moss' first RBI for St. Louis occurred on August 2, a game-winning single that scored Jason Heyward in the bottom of the ninth inning against the Rockies. Carpenter hit five home runs from July 30 to August 5. On August 5 against the Reds at Great American Ball Park, Grichuk doubled in the sixth inning and hit the game-winning home run in the top of the 13th for a 4–3 win. After closing out a 6–0 contest against Milwaukee on August 7 with three scoreless innings, Carlos Villanueva earned his second save of the season, and second of three innings. By shutting out the Brewers 3–0 on August 8, Cardinals pitchers induced 36 consecutive scoreless innings. Jaime García was the starter and winning pitcher in this game, improving to 4–4. The Cardinals extended their season-high scoreless streak to 38 innings against the Brewers on August 9, but lost the contest 5–4. They had also completed 62 innings without allowing a home run, which also ended in this game.

Due to his increased frequency of home runs, Carpenter received consideration for a second NL Player of the week Award for August 9. He batted .348 with four home runs, eight RBI, seven runs scored, a 1.000 SLG and .423 OBP. Baseball America released their annual Tool Box Awards for 2015 on August 12, rated by managers and coaches league-wide. Those rating at or near the top of various categories included Carpenter for "best strike zone judgment" (third), Yadier Molina for both "best hit and run artist" (tied for first) and "best defensive catcher" (first), Trevor Rosenthal for "best reliever" (third), and Mike Matheny for "best manager" (second).

In a 10–5 loss to the Pirates on August 13, starter Lance Lynn recorded just two outs while allowing seven runs total, three earned, in the first inning. Lynn allowed six hits while throwing 41 pitches. The Pirates scored four unearned runs after Matt Carpenter's throwing error. Pedro Álvarez, with six hits in 12 at bats, two home runs, and two doubles in the series, also homered in the first inning. That gave him 18 home runs in 80 games against the Cardinals. Lynn became the first Cardinals starter since Anthony Reyes on October 1, 2006, to fail to complete the first inning by reason other than injury. Tyler Lyons, making his first relief appearance of the season, took over for Lynn and completed 5 1/3 scoreless innings. It was the Cardinals' first scoreless relief outing of at least five innings since Manny Aybar did so in 1999.

Jaime García pitched 8 1/3 innings against the Miami Marlins at Busch Stadium on August 14 in a 3–1 win. One of the hits he allowed was to Ichiro Suzuki, his 4,191st hit in top-level professional baseball, matching Ty Cobb.^{[a]} Ichiro passed Cobb the next night with two singles as the Cardinals won, 6–2. John Lackey (10–7) was the Cardinals' starter and recorded his 12th consecutive season with at least 10 victories. In 8 1/3 IP, he struck out six, and allowed the two runs after nine hits and one walk. At one point, he retired nine consecutive batters. Randal Grichuk and Mark Reynolds both homered and Stephen Piscotty collected three hits. Piscotty then hit a home run in the next game, also against the Marlins, for his in the major leagues, and Jason Heyward homered twice for his first multi-home run game with the Cardinals. It was not enough run support as Miami won, 6–4.

After injuring his right elbow, the Cardinals placed Grichuk on the DL on August 17 due to a strain, and recalled Tommy Pham in his place. With his first major league triple, Piscotty set up the go-ahead run in a 2–1 win over the San Francisco Giants on August 17. Molina's 100th career home run on August 19 was well-timed, becoming the game-winning run in the bottom of the eighth inning at Busch Stadium in a 4–3 win over the Giants.

The Cardinals won seven of ten games on their West Coast road trip from August 21–30. After losing the first two games of the series against the San Diego Padres at Petco Park by a combined 17–3 score, the Cardinals won on August 23, 10–3. Piscotty set a new career high with five RBI, and his first multi-home run game. Michael Wacha won his 15th game.

The Cardinals swept the Arizona Diamondbacks in four games at Chase Field August 24–27. After saving his 40th game on August 26, Rosenthal became the third-youngest MLB pitcher to record back-to-back 40 save seasons, and just the second Cardinals pitcher to do so. Lee Smith registered 40 saves each season from 1991–93. In the final game of the series against the Diamondbacks, Brandon Moss hit his first home run as a Cardinal, and Tony Cruz hit his first home run of the season in a 5–3 win. The Cardinals announced on August 28 that they had chosen Randy Flores, a former relief pitcher who had played for the Cardinals' 2006 World Series championship team, as their next director of scouting. Matt Carpenter reached 20 home runs for the first time in his career on August 30 in a 7–5 win over the Giants. Reynolds and Moss also homered, and Heyward singled, doubled, and tripled, and Siegrist got his sixth save. It was the final game of the West Coast road trip.

=== September and October ===
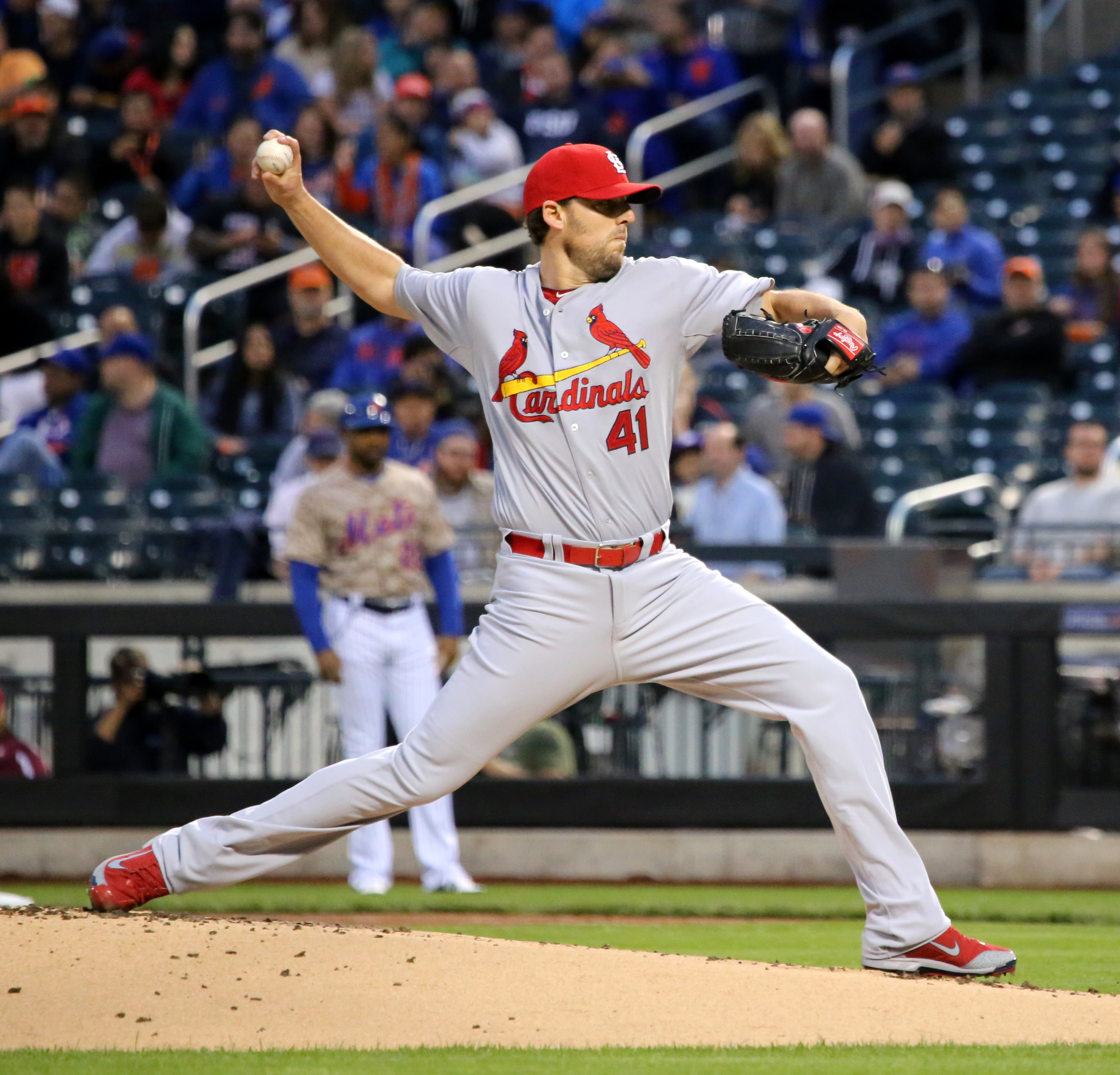
John Lackey, who led the Cardinals in innings pitched and posted a career-best 2.77 ERA, started Game 1 of the NLDS.

St. Louis won their second successive, 8–5, come-from-behind victory at Busch Stadium over the Washington Nationals on September 1. Brandon Moss provided a three-run, walk-off home run. Marco Gonzales made his first appearance of the season in this game, allowing four runs in less than three innings. This win placed the club at 40 games above .500 for the first time on the season. The club activated center fielder Jon Jay from the disabled list on September 4 after missing 57 games due to a wrist injury. Jaime García achieved his 50th career win in a 4–1 decision over the Pirates on September 5, also reaching 100 IP in a season for the first time since 2012.

The Cardinals reactivated Grichuk on September 6. Four days later, he played center field against the Cubs, but was not permitted to throw as his elbow had still not fully recovered. In an eight-game stretch, the Cardinals allowed 52 runs (6.5 per game), while scoring just 20, including a loss of 9–0 to the Cubs and another loss of 11–0 to the Reds. First baseman Matt Adams, on the DL since late May, returned to play on September 11. On September 12, MLB announced an 80-game suspension of catcher Cody Stanley after testing positive for 4-Chlorodehydromethyltestosterone, a prohibited substance under their drug policy. The club activated reliever Matt Belisle from the DL on September 12, and reactivated Matt Holliday three days later after missing 41 games.

The Cardinals swept the September 15–17 series against Milwaukee to give them their first four-game winning streak of the month. On September 16, Pham tripled and hit his first multi-home run game in a 5–4 victory. He actually homered in three consecutive plate appearances spanning his last at bat previous to the game, September 13 against Cincinnati. In the next game, Pham's line drive ricocheted off the head of starting pitcher Jimmy Nelson. Although Nelson had to leave the game, he was able to walk off the field in his own ability, and a magnetic resonance image (MRI) revealed a contusion. The Cardinals won, 6–3. Pham doubled and tripled in this game, giving him six hits and eight RBI in consecutive games against Milwaukee. With seven scoreless innings, Lackey reached 200 IP for the sixth time in his career and first time since 2010. He had a 2.23 ERA over his last 17 starts. By reaching 200 IP, he triggered a $400,000 bonus, bringing his earnings for the season over $2 million.

With the Cubs seven games back, the first-place Cardinals visited Wrigley Field on September 18 to start a three-game series, continuing a renewed Cardinals–Cubs rivalry with Chicago being more competitive than in recent years. After Cubs pitcher Dan Haren hit Matt Holliday in the back of the head in the fifth inning, Belisle grazed Anthony Rizzo behind the knee in the seventh inning, prompting his ejection. The Cubs won, 8–3. Remarked Cubs manager Joe Maddon about Belisle hitting Rizzo, "I have no history with the Cardinals except I used to love them growing up. That really showed me a lot today in a negative way. I don't know who put out the hit. I don't know if Tony Soprano is in the dugout. I didn't see him in there. But we're not going to put up with it, from them or anybody else."

Chicago defeated St. Louis again the next game, 5–4, but the Cardinals clinched at least a spot in the wild-card play-in game with the Giants' loss to the Diamondbacks, the first team of the season to advance to the playoffs. Matheny became the first manager in MLB history to guide his club to the postseason in each of his first four full seasons. In the third game of the series against the Cubs on September 20, the bases were loaded with no outs in the eight inning. Addison Russell hit a fly ball that Heyward caught running and threw home to Molina to tag out Rizzo by two steps, helping preserve a 4–3 win. However, Molina injured his left thumb as he applied the tag. An MRI revealed a partial ligament tear the following day. The same day, the Cardinals announced Adam Wainwright was cleared to resume baseball activities ahead of schedule after diligently rehabilitating his Achilles tendon rupture throughout the season. Pham drove in two of the runs in a 3–1 win over the Reds on September 22.

Catcher Travis Tartamella debuted on September 23 in the eighth inning of a 10–2 win against the Reds and singled on the first pitch of his first plate appearance. Martinez' season ended early in a start against the Brewers on September 25 in which threw only seven pitches; he also missed the postseason. The injury was a shoulder strain; however, surgery was not deemed necessary and that he would recover in time for the 2016 season. While playing the Pirates on September 28, Piscotty was injured on a fly ball into left field when he collided with Bourjos' knee, which hit him in the head. He suffered a bruise, but tests results were negative for injury, including concussion. The Cardinals won the contest 3–0, and Rosenthal gained his 48th save, establishing a new single-season franchise record.

Making his first appearance of the season since April, Wainwright pitched an inning of relief in the first game of a doubleheader against Pittsburgh on September 30, an 8–2 loss. He gave up one run on two hits with a strikeout and no walks. He had returned from injury at least four months ahead of schedule. In the second game, the Cardinals won their 100th game of the season while clinching their third consecutive National League Central division title by an 11–1 score. The Pirates, who had kept close with the Cardinals for nearly the entire season, had won their 96th game of the season earlier in the day. They already qualified as one of two wild card entrants, along with the Cubs. Heyward hit a grand slam to highlight the second game, the second of his career, and robbed both Francisco Cervelli and Michael Morse of hits. Tyler Lyons, filling in for the injured Carlos Martínez, completed seven scoreless innings with just four hits and no walks allowed. Carpenter doubled and tripled, and Peralta added three RBI. Seigrist, making his major league-leading 80th appearance of the season, became just the third left-handed pitcher in franchise history to make that many appearances in a season.

The Cardinals finished their regular season October 1–3 against the Atlanta Braves at Turner Field, which the Braves swept. They held the Cardinals scoreless in their final 27 innings of the regular season.

== Schedule and results ==
=== Game log ===
2015 St. Louis Cardinals Game Log (100–62)
April: 15–6 (.714) (Home: 8–2; Away: 7–4)

#	Date	Opponent	Score	Win	Loss	Save	Attendance	Record	Box/L10
1	April 5	@ Cubs	3–0	**Wainwright** (1–0)	Lester (0–1)	**Rosenthal** (1)	35,055	1–0	1–0
–	April 7	@ Cubs	**Postponed (inclement weather)** (Makeup date: July 7th)						
2	April 8	@ Cubs	0–2	Arrieta (1-0)	**Lynn** (0-1)	Rondón (1)	26,814	1–1	1–1
3	April 10	@ Reds	4–5	Hoover (2-0)	**Walden** (0-1)	Chapman (2)	30,808	1–2	1–2
4	April 11	@ Reds	4–1	**Wacha** (1-0)	Cueto (0-1)	**Rosenthal** (2)	41,525	2–2	2–2
5	April 12	@ Reds	7–5 (11)	**Villanueva** (1-0)	Gregg (0-1)	–	41,446	3–2	3–2
6	April 13	Brewers	4–5	Garza (1-1)	**Wainwright** (1-1)	Rodríguez (1)	47,875	3–3	3–3
7	April 15	Brewers	4–2	**Lynn** (1-1)	Peralta (0-1)	**Rosenthal** (3)	40,826	4–3	4–3
8	April 16	Brewers	4–0	**Lackey** (1-0)	Fiers (0-2)	–	40,079	5–3	5–3
9	April 17	Reds	6–1	**Wacha** (2-0)	Cueto (0-2)	**Siegrist** (1)	46,462	6–3	6–3
10	April 18	Reds	5–2	**Martínez** (1-0)	Bailey (0-1)	**Rosenthal** (4)	45,906	7–3	7–3
11	April 19	Reds	2–1	**Wainwright** (2–1)	Leake (0–1)	**Walden** (1)	40,742	8–3	7–3
12	April 21	@ Nationals	1–2 (10)	Barrett (2-0)	**Villanueva** (1-1)	–	27,021	8–4	7–3
13	April 22	@ Nationals	7–5	**Siegrist** (1-0)	Treinen (0-2)	**Rosenthal** (5)	25,771	9–4	8–2
14	April 23	@ Nationals	4–1	**Wacha** (3-0)	Scherzer (1-2)	**Rosenthal** (6)	26,990	10–4	8–2
15	April 24	@ Brewers	3–0	**Martínez** (2-0)	Garza (1-3)	**Rosenthal** (7)	26,286	11–4	8–2
16	April 25	@ Brewers	5–3	**Belisle** (1-0)	Peralta (0-3)	**Maness** (1)	35,919	12–4	9–1
17	April 26	@ Brewers	3–6	Blazek (1-0)	**Lynn** (1-2)	Rodríguez (3)	32,758	12–5	8–2
18	April 27	Phillies	1–4	Hamels (1-2)	**Lackey** (1-1)	Papelbon (5)	40,052	12–6	7–3
19	April 28	Phillies	11–5	**Wacha** (4-0)	González (0-1)	–	40,143	13–6	7–3
20	April 29	Phillies	5–2	**Martínez** (3-0)	Harang (2-2)	**Rosenthal** (8)	40,399	14–6	7–3
21	April 30	Phillies	9–3	**Villanueva** (2-1)	Buchanan (0-5)	–	40,715	15–6	7–3

May: 18–11 (.621) (Home: 12–4; Away: 6–7)

#	Date	Opponent	Score	Win	Loss	Save	Attendance	Record	Box/L10
22	May 1	Pirates	2–1 (10)	**Choate** (1–0)	Scahill (0–2)	–	40,912	16–6	7–3
23	May 2	Pirates	2–1 (11)	**Villanueva** (3-1)	Hughes (0-1)	–	45,095	17–6	8–2
24	May 3	Pirates	3–2 (14)	**Socolovich** (1-0)	Liz (1-2)	–	44,382	18–6	8–2
25	May 4	Cubs	10–9	**Socolovich** (2-0)	Strop (0-2)	**Maness** (2)	41,981	19–6	8–2
26	May 5	Cubs	7–4	**Harris** (1-0)	Jackson (1-1)	**Rosenthal** (9)	41,613	20-6	8–2
27	May 6	Cubs	5–6	Lester (2-2)	**Lynn** (1-3)	Rondon (6)	42,207	20–7	8–2
28	May 7	Cubs	5–1	**Lackey** (2-1)	Arrieta (3-3)	**Rosenthal** (10)	44,472	21–7	9–1
29	May 8	@ Pirates	8–5	**Wacha** (5-0)	Liriano (1-2)	**Rosenthal** (11)	33,507	22–7	9–1
30	May 9	@ Pirates	5–7	Scahill (1-2)	**Martínez** (3-1)	Melancon (6)	38,068	22–8	8–2
31	May 10	@ Pirates	3–4	Hughes (1-1)	**Harris** (1-1)	Melancon (7)	34,036	22–9	7–3
32	May 12	@ Indians	8–3	**Lynn** (2-3)	Carrasco (4-3)	–	12,615	23–9	7–3
33	May 13	@ Indians	0–2	Kluber (1-5)	**Lackey** (2-2)	Allen (5)	12,313	23–10	6–4
34	May 14	@ Indians	2–1	**Siegrist** (2-0)	Rzepczynski (1-1)	**Rosenthal** (12)	15,865	24–10	6–4
35	May 15	Tigers	4–10	Greene (4-2)	**Martinez** (3-2)	–	45,601	24–11	5–5
36	May 16	Tigers	3–4	Hardy (1-0)	**Belisle** (1-1)	Soria (12)	45,313	24–12	4–6
37	May 17	Tigers	2–1	**Lynn** (3-3)	Simón (4-2)	**Rosenthal** (13)	43,654	25–12	5–5
38	May 18	@ Mets	1–2 (14)	Torres (2-2)	**Tuivailala** (0-1)	–	23,338	25–13	4–6
39	May 19	@ Mets	10–2	**Wacha** (6-0)	Niese (3-4)	–	21,157	26–13	4–6
40	May 20	@ Mets	9–0	**Martínez** (4-2)	Colón (6-3)	–	23,726	27–13	5–5
41	May 21	@ Mets	0–5	deGrom (5-4)	**García** (0-1)	–	32,783	27–14	5–5
42	May 22	@ Royals	0–5	Young (4-0)	**Lynn** (3-4)	–	37,379	27–15	4–6
43	May 23	@ Royals	2–3 (6)	Vólquez (4-3)	**Lackey** (2-3)	–	38,676	27–16	4–6
44	May 24	@ Royals	6–1	**Wacha** (7-0)	Ventura (3-4)	–	36,342	28–16	4–6
45	May 25	Diamondbacks	3–2 (10)	**Rosenthal** (1-0)	Ramirez (1-1)	–	42,853	29–16	5–5
46	May 26	Diamondbacks	6–4	**García** (1-1)	Bradley (2-2)	**Maness** (3)	41,107	30–16	6–4
47	May 27	Diamondbacks	4–3	**Maness** (1-0)	Ziegler (0-1)	–	43,715	31–16	6–4
48	May 29	Dodgers	3–0	**Lackey** (3-3)	Bolsinger (3-1)	**Rosenthal** (14)	44,223	32–16	7–3
49	May 30	Dodgers	1–5	Frías (4-2)	**Wacha** (7-1)	–	44,754	32–17	6–4
50	May 31	Dodgers	3–1	**Martínez** (5-2)	Anderson (2-3)	**Rosenthal** (15)	45,285	33–17	6–4

June: 18–8 (.692) (Home: 9–2; Away: 9–6)

#	Date	Opponent	Score	Win	Loss	Save	Attendance	Record	Box/L10
51	June 1	Brewers	0–1	Fiers (2-5)	**García** (1-2)	Rodríguez (9)	40,689	33–18	6–4
52	June 2	Brewers	1–0	**Lynn** (4-4)	Cravy (0-1)	**Rosenthal** (16)	42,835	34–18	6–4
53	June 3	Brewers	7–4	**Lackey** (4-3)	Nelson (2-6)	**Rosenthal** (17)	41,567	35–18	7–3
54	June 4	@ Dodgers	7–1	**Wacha** (8–1)	Frías (4–3)	–	45,058	36–18	8–2
55	June 5	@ Dodgers	2–1	**Martínez** (6-2)	Anderson (2-4)	**Rosenthal** (18)	44,649	37–18	8–2
56	June 6	@ Dodgers	2–0	Kershaw (5-3)	**García** (1-3)	Jansen (6)	47,655	37-19	7–3
57	June 7	@ Dodgers	4–2	**Siegrist** (3–0)	Nicasio (1–2)	**Rosenthal** (19)	41,500	38-19	7–3
58	June 8	@ Rockies	3–11	Hale (2–0)	**Lackey** (4–4)	–	32,043	38-20	6–4
59	June 9	@ Rockies	4–3	de la Rosa (3–2)	**Wacha** (8–2)	Axford (11)	33,731	38–21	6–4
60	June 10	@ Rockies	4–2	**Martínez** (7-2)	Bettis (2-1)	**Rosenthal** (20)	30,698	39–21	6–4
61	June 12	Royals	4–0	**García** (2-3)	Ventura (3–6)	–	45,909	40–21	7–3
62	June 13	Royals	3–2	**Lyons** (1–0)	Guthrie (4–4)	**Rosenthal** (21)	45,981	41–21	7–3
--	June 14	Royals	**Postponed (inclement weather)** (Makeup date: July 23)						
63	June 15	Twins	3–2	**Lackey** (5–4)	May (4–5)	**Siegrist** (2)	43,174	42–21	7–3
64	June 16	Twins	3–2	**Wacha** (9–2)	Gibson (4–5)	**Siegrist** (3)	41,203	43–21	7–3
65	June 17	@ Twins	1–3	Milone (3-1)	**Martínez** (7-3)	Perkins (23)	34,381	43–22	6–4
66	June 18	@ Twins	1–2	Boyer (2-2)	**Villanueva** (3-2)	–	34,648	43–23	6–4
67	June 19	@ Phillies	12–4	**Lyons** (2–0)	Aumont (0–1)	–	21,169	44–23	6–4
68	June 20	@ Phillies	10–1	**Lackey** (6–4)	Harang (4–9)	–	24,256	45–23	7–3
69	June 21	@ Phillies	2–9	Morgan (1–0)	**Wacha** (9–3)	–	30,423	45–24	7–3
70	June 23	@ Marlins	4–3	**Martínez** (8–3)	Dyson (3–3)	**Rosenthal** (22)	21,759	46–24	7–3
71	June 24	@ Marlins	6–1	**García** (3-3)	Latos (2-5)	–	18,492	47–24	7–3
72	June 25	@ Marlins	5–1	**Lynn** (5-4)	Haren (6-5)	–	20,733	48–24	7–3
73	June 26	Cubs	3–2 (10)	**Maness** (2-0)	Grimm (1-2)	–	45,558	49–24	7–3
74	June 27	Cubs	8–1	**Wacha** (10-3)	Roach (0-1)	**Villanueva** (1)	46,407	50–24	7–3
75	June 28	Cubs	4–1	**Martínez** (9-3)	Hammel (5-3)	**Rosenthal** (23)	45,384	51–24	8–2
76	June 30	White Sox	1–2 (11)	Webb (1-0)	**Socolovich** (2-1)	Robertson (16)	45,626	51–25	8–2

July: 15–12 (.556) (Home: 10–7; Away: 5–5)

#	Date	Opponent	Score	Win	Loss	Save	Attendance	Record	Box/L10
77	July 1	White Sox	1–7	Quintana (4–7)	**Lackey** (6–5)	–	41,696	51–26	8–2
78	July 2	Padres	3–5 (11)	Kelley (1–2)	**Villanueva** (3–3)	Kimbrel (20)	42,926	51–27	7–3
79	July 3	Padres	1–2	Benoit (5–3)	**Rosenthal** (1–1)	Kimbrel (21)	47,330	51–28	6–4
80	July 4	Padres	2–1	**Maness** (3–0)	Maurer (5–1)	**Rosenthal** (24)	44,690	52–28	6–4
81	July 5	Padres	3–1	**Lynn** (6–4)	Kennedy (4–8)	**Siegrist** (4)	42,764	53–28	6–4
82	July 6	@ Cubs	6–0	**Lackey** (7–5)	Lester (4–7)	–	37,609	54–28	6–4
83	July 7	@ Cubs	4–7	Arrieta (9–5)	**Lyons** (2–1)	–	34,368	54–29	5–5
84	July 7	@ Cubs	3–5	Wood (5–3)	**Maness** (3–1)	Motte (5)	35,703	54–30	4–6
85	July 8	@ Cubs	6–5	**Socolovich** (3–1)	Strop (1–4)	**Rosenthal** (25)	37,993	55–30	4–6
86	July 9	@ Pirates	4–1	**Martínez** (10–3)	Locke (5–5)	**Rosenthal** (26)	35,183	56–30	5–5
87	July 10	@ Pirates	2–5	Cole (13–3)	**Lynn** (6–5)	Melancon (29)	36,825	56–31	5–5
88	July 11	@ Pirates	5–6 (14)	Worley (3–4)	**Greenwood** (0–1)	–	37,318	56–32	5–5
89	July 12	@ Pirates	5–6 (10)	Caminero (1–1)	**Rosenthal** (1–2)	–	33,544	56–33	5–5
ASG	**86th All-Star Game** at Great American Ball Park in Cincinnati, Ohio, United States								Box
ASG	July 14	American 6, **National** 3		Price (AL, DET)	Kershaw (NL, LAD)	–	43,656	43−41–2	Box
ASG	Representing the Cardinals: Holliday, Martínez, Molina, Peralta, Rosenthal, and Wacha								Box
90	July 17	Mets	3–2	**Lynn** (7–5)	Syndergaard (4–5)	**Rosenthal** (27)	44,540	57–33	5–5
91	July 18	Mets	12–2	**Lackey** (8–5)	Colón (9–8)	–	45,852	58–33	5–5
92	July 19	Mets	1–3 (18)	Torres (3–4)	**Martínez** (10–4)	–	43,194	58–34	4–6
93	July 21	@ White Sox	8–5	**Wacha** (11–3)	Rodon (3–3)	**Rosenthal** (28)	29,728	59–34	5–5
94	July 22	@ White Sox	3–2	**Socolovich** (4–1)	Duke (3–4)	**Rosenthal** (29)	30,046	60–34	6–4
95	July 23	Royals	4–3	**Lackey** (9–5)	Young (8–6)	**Rosenthal** (30)	46,003	61–34	6–4
96	July 24	Braves	4–2	**Cooney** (1–0)	Banuelos (1–2)	**Siegrist** (5)	44,778	62–34	6–4
97	July 25	Braves	1–0	**Martínez** (11–4)	Miller (5–7)	**Choate** (1)	45,862	63–34	7–3
98	July 26	Braves	2–3	Wisler (5–1)	**Wacha** (11–4)	Johnson (9)	44,870	63–35	7–3
99	July 27	Reds	4–1	**Lynn** (8–5)	Iglesias (1–3)	**Rosenthal** (31)	42,553	64–35	8–2
100	July 28	Reds	0–4	Leake (9–5)	**García** (3–4)	–	41,466	64–36	7–3
101	July 29	Reds	1–11	DeSclafani (6–7)	**Lackey** (9–6)	Chapman (21)	42,334	64–37	6–4
102	July 30	Rockies	9–8	**Villanueva** (4–3)	Axford (3–4)	–	43,518	65-37	7–3
103	July 31	Rockies	7–0	**Wacha** (12-4)	Kendrick (4-12)	–	42,568	66–37	7–3

August: 19–9 (.679) (Home: 8–4; Away: 11–5)

#	Date	Opponent	Score	Win	Loss	Save	Attendance	Record	Box/L10
104	August 1	Rockies	2–6	de la Rosa (7–4)	**Lynn** (8–6)	–	45,216	66–38	6–4
105	August 2	Rockies	3–2	**Rosenthal** (2–2)	Oberg (2–2)	–	44,743	67–38	6–4
106	August 4	@ Reds	2–3	DeSclafani (7–7)	**Lackey** (9–7)	Chapman (23)	25,969	67–39	5–5
107	August 5	@ Reds	4–3 (13)	**Maness** (4–1)	Axelrod (0–1)	–	34,700	68–39	5–5
108	August 6	@ Reds	3–0	**Wacha** (13–4)	Lorenzen (3–7)	**Rosenthal** (32)	26,053	69–39	6–4
109	August 7	@ Brewers	6–0	**Lynn** (9–6)	Cravy (0–3)	**Villanueva** (2)	28,869	70–39	6–4
110	August 8	@ Brewers	3–0	**García** (4–4)	Peralta (2–7)	**Rosenthal** (33)	34,327	71–39	7–3
111	August 9	@ Brewers	4–5	Smith (2–2)	**Broxton** (1–3)	Rodríguez (26)	34,993	71–40	7–3
112	August 11	Pirates	4–3	**Martínez** (12–4)	Locke (6–7)	**Rosenthal** (34)	41,273	72–40	7–3
113	August 12	Pirates	4–2	**Wacha** (14–4)	Cole (14–6)	**Rosenthal** (35)	41,493	73–40	7–3
114	August 13	Pirates	5–10	**Liriano** (8–6)	**Lynn** (9–7)	–	41,501	73–41	7–3
115	August 14	Marlins	3–1	**García** (5–4)	**Koehler** (8–10)	**Rosenthal** (36)	42,025	74–41	7–3
116	August 15	Marlins	6–2	**Lackey** (10–7)	Hand (2–3)	–	44,706	75–41	8–2
117	August 16	Marlins	6–14	Narveson (1–0)	**Martínez** (12–5)	Ramos (19)	43,826	75–42	7–3
118	August 17	Giants	2–1	**Siegrist** (4–0)	Strickland (2–2)	**Rosenthal** (37)	40,088	76–42	7–3
119	August 18	Giants	2–10	Vogelsong (9–8)	**Lynn** (9–8)	Casilla (29)	40,297	76–43	6–4
120	August 19	Giants	4–3	**Siegrist** (5–0)	Strickland (2–3)	**Rosenthal** (38)	40,278	77–43	6–4
121	August 21	@ Padres	3–9	Cashner (5–12)	**Lackey** (10–8)	–	32,734	77–44	6–4
122	August 22	@ Padres	0–8	Kennedy (8–11)	**Martínez** (12–6)	–	44,816	77–45	5–5
123	August 23	@ Padres	10–3	**Wacha** (15–4)	Rea (2–1)	–	33,756	78–45	5–5
124	August 24	@ D-backs	5–3	**Lynn** (10–8)	Chacín (0–1)	**Rosenthal** (39)	19,892	79–45	6–4
125	August 25	@ D-backs	9–1	**García** (6–4)	Ray (3–10)	–	18,720	80–45	6–4
126	August 26	@ D-backs	3–1	**Lackey** (11–8)	Hernandez (1–4)	**Rosenthal** (40)	17,572	81–45	6–4
127	August 27	@ D-backs	5–3	**Martínez** (13–6)	De La Rosa (11–6)	**Rosenthal** (41)	22,036	82–45	7–3
128	August 28	@ Giants	4–5	López (1–0)	**Siegrist** (5–1)	–	41,577	82–46	7–3
129	August 29	@ Giants	6–0	**Lynn** (11–8)	Vogelsong (9–10)	–	41,796	83–46	7–3
130	August 30	@ Giants	7–5	**García** (7–4)	Heston (11–8)	**Siegrist** (6)	41,770	84–46	7–3
131	August 31	Nationals	8–5	**Siegrist** (6–1)	Janssen (1–3)	**Rosenthal** (42)	42,081	85–46	8–2

September: 15–13 (.536) (Home: 8–7; Away: 7–6 )

#	Date	Opponent	Score	Win	Loss	Save	Attendance	Record	Box/L10
132	September 1	Nationals	8–5	**Harris** (2–1)	Janssen (1–4)		42,589	86–46	9–1
133	September 2	Nationals	3–4	Martin (1–0)	**Broxton** (1–4)	Papelbon (23)	41,489	86–47	8–2
134	September 4	Pirates	3–9	Happ (8–7)	**Martínez** (13–7)	–	44,338	86–48	7–3
135	September 5	Pirates	4–1	**García** (8–4)	Morton (8–7)	–	45,139	87–48	7–3
136	September 6	Pirates	1–7	Cole (16–8)	**Lackey** (11–9)	–	46,011	87–49	6–4
137	September 7	Cubs	0–9	Haren (9–9)	**Lynn** (11–9)	–	45,986	87–50	5–5
138	September 8	Cubs	5–8	Hammel (8–6)	**Wacha** (15–5)	Rondon (27)	42,206	87–51	5–5
139	September 9	Cubs	4–3	**Broxton** (2–4)	Richard (3–1)	**Rosenthal** (43)	43,557	88–51	5–5
140	September 10	@ Reds	11–12	Lamb (1–3)	**García** (8–5)	–	16,363	88–52	4–6
141^{[b]}	September 11	@ Reds	2–4	Hoover (8–1)	**Broxton** (2–5)	Chapman (30)	31,427	88–53	3–7
142	September 12	@ Reds	1–5	DeSclafani (9–10)	**Lynn** (11–10)	–	41,137	88–54	2–8
143	September 13	@ Reds	9–2	**Wacha** (16–5)	LeCure (0–1)	–	29,900	89–54	3–7
144	September 15	@ Brewers	3–1 (10)	**Siegrist** (7–1)	Thornburg (0–2)	**Rosenthal** (44)	30,349	90–54	4–6
145	September 16	@ Brewers	5–4	**García** (9–5)	Peralta (5–9)	**Rosenthal** (45)	19,827	91–54	4–6
146	September 17	@ Brewers	6–3	**Lackey** (12–9)	Nelson (11–13)	–	23,734	92–54	5–5
147	September 18	@ Cubs	3–8	Hunter (4–2)	**Maness** (4–2)	–	40,846	92–55	5–5
148	September 19	@ Cubs	4–5	Cahill (1–3)	**Wacha** (16–6)	Strop (3)	40,994	92–56	5–5
149	September 20	@ Cubs	4–3	**Martínez** (14–7)	Lester (10–11)	**Rosenthal** (46)	40,962	93–56	5–5
150	September 21	Reds	2–1	**Broxton** (3–5)	Hoover (8–2)	**Rosenthal** (47)	43,902	94–56	6–4
151	September 22	Reds	3–1	**Lackey** (13–9)	LeCure (0–2)	**Cishek** (4)	43,981	95–56	7–3
152	September 23	Reds	10–2	**Lynn** (12–10)	Finnegan (4–1)	–	43,729	96–56	8–2
153	September 24	Brewers	7–3	**Wacha** (17–6)	Jungmann (9–7)	–	43,243	97–56	8–2
154	September 25	Brewers	3–4	Smith (7–2)	**Rosenthal** (2–3)	–	45.057	97–57	7–3
155	September 26	Brewers	5–1	**García** (10–5)	Wagner (0–1)	–	45,561	98–57	7–3
156	September 27	Brewers	4–8	Goforth (1–0)	**Rosenthal** (2–4)	Rodríguez (37)	45,021	98–58	6–4
157	September 28	@ Pirates	3–0	**Broxton** (4–5)	Melancon (3–2)	**Rosenthal** (48)	30,198	99–58	7–3
－	September 29	@ Pirates	Postponed (rain). Makeup date: September 30.						
158	September 30	@ Pirates	2–8	Cole (19–8)	**Wacha** (17–7)	–	29,747	99–59	7–3
159	September 30	@ Pirates	11–1	**Lyons** (3–1)	Morton (9–9)	–	34,729	100–59	7–3

October: 0-3 (.000) (Home: 0–0; Away: 0-3 )

#	Date	Opponent	Score	Win	Loss	Save	Attendance	Record	Box/L10
160	October 2	@ Braves	0–4	Teherán (11–8)	**García** (10–6)	–	24,481	100–60	6–4
–	October 3	@ Braves	Postponed (rain). Makeup date: October 4.						
161	October 4	@ Braves	0–6	Miller (6–17)	**Lackey** (13–10)	–	31,441	100–61	5–5
162	October 4	@ Braves	0–2	Wisler (8–8)	**Lynn** (12–11)	Jackson (1)	31,441	100–62	4–6

Legend: = Win = Loss = Postponement
Bold = Cardinals team member

== Roster ==
2015 St. Louis Cardinals
Roster
Pitchers: 37 Matt Belisle; 30 Jonathan Broxton; 36 Randy Choate; 28 Steve Cishek; 66 Tim Cooney; 54 Jaime García; 56 Marco Gonzales; 62 Nick Greenwood; 40 Mitch Harris; 67 Marcus Hatley; 41 John Lackey; 31 Lance Lynn; 70 Tyler Lyons; 61 Seth Maness; 18 Carlos Martínez; 44 Trevor Rosenthal; 46 Kevin Siegrist; 63 Miguel Socolovich; 64 Samuel Tuivailala; 33 Carlos Villanueva; 52 Michael Wacha; 50 Adam Wainwright; 53 Jordan Walden	Catchers: 48 Tony Cruz; 23 Ed Easley; 4 Yadier Molina; 43 Cody Stanley; 68 Travis Tartamella; Infielders: 32 Matt Adams; 13 Matt Carpenter; 35 Greg Garcia; 30 Dan Johnson; 38 Pete Kozma; 21 Brandon Moss; 27 Jhonny Peralta; 12 Mark Reynolds; 59 Xavier Scruggs; 16 Kolten Wong	Outfielders: 8 Peter Bourjos; 15 Randal Grichuk; 22 Jason Heyward; 7 Matt Holliday; 19 Jon Jay; 60 Thomas Pham; 55 Stephen Piscotty; Other batters: 65 Dean Anna	Manager: 26 Mike Matheny; Coaches: 25 David Bell (bench); 49 Blaise Ilsley (bullpen); 34 Derek Lilliquist (pitching); 47 John Mabry (hitting); 77 Chris Maloney (first base); 3 Bill Mueller (assistant hitting); 11 José Oquendo (third base); 39 Jamie Pogue (bullpen catcher); 76 Kleininger Teran (bullpen catcher)

=== Injury report ===
Name	Duration		Injury type	Disabled list	Games missed	Ref.
Name	Start	End	Injury type	Disabled list	Games missed	Ref.
Jaime García ^{(1)}	July 5, 2014	May 21, 2015	Thoracic outlet syndrome	60-day	116	
Tommy Pham	March 13, 2015	June 6, 2015	Quadriceps grade 2 strain (left)	60-day	57	
Randal Grichuk ^{(1)}	April 18, 2015	May 16, 2015	Back strain	15-day	26	
Adam Wainwright	April 26, 2015	Current – Out for season	Achilles tendon rupture (left)	60-day	145 (estimated)	
Jordan Walden	May 3, 2015	Current	Biceps inflammation	60-day		
Jon Jay ^{(1)}	May 14, 2015	May 28, 2015	Wrist tendinitis (left)	15-day	13	
Matt Adams	May 28, 2015	September 9, 2015	Quadriceps grade 3 strain (right)	60-day	92	
Matt Holliday ^{(1)}	June 8, 2015	July 17, 2015	Quadriceps grade 2 strain (right)	15-day	31	
Jaime García ^{(2)}	June 25, 2015	July 28, 2015	Groin strain (right)	15-day	28	
Matt Belisle	June 30, 2015	September 12, 2015	Right forearm strain	60-day	66	
Jon Jay ^{(2)}	July 1, 2015	September 4, 2015	Wrist stress reaction (left)	15-day	57	
Mitch Harris	July 11, 2015	July 27, 2015	Groin strain	15-day	13	
Matt Holliday ^{(2)}	July 29, 2015	September 15, 2015	Quadriceps grade 2 strain (right)	15-day	41	
Randal Grichuk ^{(2)}	August 17, 2015	September 6, 2015	Elbow strain (right)	15-day	18	

=== In-season acquisitions and roster moves ===
Club officials

Chris Correa	St. Louis Cardinals Director of scouting (Incumbent)	Fired July 2, 2015
Randy Flores	Departed USC Trojans Assistant coach	Hired by St. Louis Cardinals As Director of scouting August 28, 2015

40-man roster moves matrix

Date	To MLB roster	Inactive 40-man roster^{&}	Disabled list	Off 40-man roster	Notes
April 10	Ed Easley (C)	Ed Easley	Tony Cruz (OF); 3-day paternity list		
April 13	Tony Cruz (C)	Ed Easley (C)	Tony Cruz		
April 18	Dean Anna (IF)	Dean Anna	Randal Grichuk (OF)		
April 21	Mitch Harris (RHP)	Mitch Harris	Peter Bourjos (OF); 3-day paternity list	Gary Brown ^{#} (OF); DFA, LAA claimed	
April 25	Peter Bourjos (OF)	Dean Anna (IF)	Peter Bourjos		
April 26	Cody Stanley (C)	Cody Stanley	Adam Wainwright (RHP)		
April 30	Tim Cooney^{[A]} (LHP)	Cody Stanley (C)		Adam Wainwright ^ (RHP)	
Date	To MLB roster	Inactive 40-man roster^{&}	Disabled list	Off 40-man roster	Notes
May 1	Miguel Socolovich^{[B]} (RHP)	Cooney (LHP)		Tommy Pham ^ (OF)	
May 3	Sam Tuivailala (RHP)	Sam Tuivailala	Jordan Walden (RHP)		
May 5	Tyler Lyons (LHP)	Sam Tuivailala (RHP)			
May 14	Xavier Scruggs (IF)	Xavier Scruggs	Jon Jay (OF)		
May 16	Randal Grichuk (OF)	Xavier Scruggs (IF)	Randal Grichuk		
May 17	Sam Tuivailala (RHP)	Tyler Lyons (LHP)			
May 21	Jaime García (LHP)	Sam Tuivailala (RHP)	Jaime García		
May 28	Ed Easley (C)	Ed Easley	Matt Adams (1B)		
May 28	Jon Jay (OF)	Miguel Socolovich (RHP)	Jon Jay		
Date	To MLB roster	Inactive 40-man roster^{&}	Disabled list	Off 40-man roster	Notes
June 6		Tommy Pham^{[C]} (OF)		Matt Adams ^ (1B)	
June 9	Miguel Socolovich (RHP)	Miguel Socolovich	Matt Holliday (OF)		
June 12	Tyler Lyons (LHP)	Tyler Lyons	Lance Lynn^{[D]} (RHP)		
June 19	Xavier Scruggs (IF); Greg Garcia (IF)	Mitch Harris (RHP); Ed Easley (C)			
June 25	Lance Lynn (RHP)	Tyler Lyons (LHP)	Lance Lynn		
June 30	Marcus Hatley^{[E]} (RHP)	Marcus Hatley	Matt Belisle (RHP)	Jordan Walden ^ (RHP)	
Date	To MLB roster	Inactive 40-man roster^{&}	Disabled list	Off 40-man roster	Notes
July 2	Tim Cooney (LHP)	Tim Cooney	Jon Jay (OF)		
July 3	Tommy Pham (OF)	Tim Cooney (LHP)			
July 4	Mitch Harris (RHP)	Greg Garcia (IF)			
July 5	Tim Cooney (LHP)	Tim Cooney	Jaime García^{[F]} (LHP)		
July 7	Tyler Lyons^{[G]} (LHP)	Marcus Hatley (RHP)			
July 8	Dan Johnson^{[H]} (IF)	Tyler Lyons (LHP)		Aledmys Díaz (IF); DFA, cleared waivers and reassigned to Springfield	
July 11	Sam Tuivailala (RHP); Nick Greenwood (LHP)	Xavier Scruggs (IF)	Mitch Harris (RHP)		
July 17	Matt Holliday (OF)	Nick Greenwood (RHP)	Matt Holliday		
July 21	Stephen Piscotty^{[I]} (OF)	Tommy Pham (OF)		Ty Kelly^{#} (IF); DFA, TOR claimed	
July 24			Matt Belisle	Matt Belisle ^ (RHP)	
July 25	Steve Cishek^{[J]} (RHP)	Tim Cooney (LHP)			
July 27		Mitch Harris (RHP)	Mitch Harris		
July 27		Tim Cooney	Tim Cooney (LHP)		
July 30	Greg Garcia (IF)	Greg Garcia	Matt Holliday (OF)		
July 30	Brandon Moss^{[K]} (OF/1B)	Dan Johnson		Dan Johnson (1B); Marcus Hatley (RHP); DFA, cleared waivers and reassigned to Memphis	
July 31	Jonathan Broxton^{[L]} (RHP)	Marcus Hatley		Dan Johnson (1B); Marcus Hatley (RHP); DFA, cleared waivers and reassigned to Memphis	
Date	To MLB roster	Inactive 40-man roster^{&}	Disabled list	Off 40-man roster	Notes
August 6	Tyler Lyons (RHP)	Greg Garcia (IF)			
August 17	Tommy Pham (OF)	Tommy Pham	Randal Grichuk (OF)		
August 23	Greg Garcia (IF)	Tyler Lyons (RHP)			
August 25	Tyler Lyons (RHP)	Greg Garcia^{[M]} (IF)			
August 28	Sam Tuivailala (RHP)	Sam Tuivailala	Trevor Rosenthal (RHP); 3-day paternity list		
August 31	Trevor Rosenthal (RHP)	Sam Tuivailala (RHP)			
Date	To MLB roster	Inactive 40-man roster^{&}	Disabled list	Off 40-man roster	Notes
September 1	Marco Gonzales (RHP); Mitch Harris (RHP); Cody Stanley (C)	Marco Gonzales; Mitch Harris; Cody Stanley			
September 2	Nick Greenwood (RHP); Tyler Lyons (LHP); Miguel Socolovich (RHP)	Greenwood, Lyons, Socolovich; Marco Gonzales (RHP)			
September 4	Jon Jay (OF)	Nick Greenwood (RHP) (Sept 3)	Jon Jay		
September 6	Randal Grichuk (OF)		Randal Grichuk		
September 8	Sam Tuivailala (RHP)	Sam Tuivailala			
September 9	Matt Adams (1B)		Matt Adams		
September 12	Matt Belisle (RHP); Cody Stanley	Cody Stanley^{[N]} (C)	Matt Belisle		
September 15	Matt Holliday (OF)		Matt Holliday		
September 21	Travis Tartamella^{[O]} (C)	Xavier Scruggs		Xavier Scruggs (1B)	

&: Names in this column indicate player was optioned to Memphis and off the active roster, or from Memphis and activated, in this transaction, unless otherwise noted.
#: Indicates player departed the St. Louis Cardinals organization before or at season's end.
^: Indicates player was transferred to 60-day DL in this transaction.

1. Tim Cooney was added to both the 25- and 40-man rosters when Adam Wainwright was shifted to 60-day DL.
2. Miguel Socolovich was added to both the 25- and 40-man rosters when Tommy Pham was shifted to 60-day DL.
3. Matt Adams was moved to the 60-day DL and Tommy Pham was activated from the 60-day DL and optioned to Memphis.
4. Lance Lynn was placed on the 15-day DL with a right forearm strain, retroactive to June 8.
5. Marcus Hatley was added to both the 25- and 40-man rosters when Matt Belisle was placed on the 15-day DL and Jordan Walden was shifted to 60-day DL.
6. Jaíme Garcia was placed on the 15-day DL with a groin strain, retroactive to June 25.
7. Tyler Lyons was recalled from Memphis before the first game of the day-night doubleheader against the Chicago Cubs as the 26th man on the active roster and Marcus Hatley was optioned back to Memphis after the second game.
8. Dan Johnson was added to both the 25- and 40-man rosters when the Cardinals optioned Tyler Lyons to Memphis (off the 25-man roster), and designated Aledmys Díaz for assignment, removing him from the 40-man roster. Díaz cleared waivers, and was placed on optional assignment with the Springfield Cardinals (AA affiliate of the St. Louis Cardinals), was designated for assignment to make room on the 40-man roster for Johnson
9. Stephen Piscotty was added to both the 25- and 40-man rosters when the Cardinals optioned Tommy Pham to Memphis (off the 25-man roster) and designated Ty Kelly for assignment (off the 40-man roster), who the Toronto Blue Jays claimed the next day.
10. The Cardinals acquired Steve Cishek in a trade with the Miami Marlins for Kyle Barraclough, a minor league pitcher not on the 40-man roster. To make room for Cishek on the 25- and 40-man rosters, the Cardinals transferred Matt Belisle to the 60-day DL on July 24 (off the 40-man roster), and optioned Tim Cooney to Memphis (off the 25-man roster).
11. The Cardinals acquired Brandon Moss in a trade with the Cleveland Indians for Rob Kaminsky, a minor league pitcher not on the 40-man roster. To make room for Moss on the 25- and 40-man rosters, Dan Johnson was designated for assignment.
12. The Cardinals acquired Jonathan Broxton in a trade with the Milwaukee Brewers for Malik Collymore, a minor league outfielder not on the 40-man roster. To make room for Moss on the 25- and 40-man rosters, Marcus Hatley was designated for assignment.
13. The Cardinals optioned Greg Garcia to AA Springfield.
14. Major League Baseball suspended Cody Stanley for 80 games for violating its drug policy, thus placing him on the Cardinals restricted list and off the 25-man roster.
15. Travis Tartamella was added to both the 25- and 40-man rosters when the Cardinals designated Xavier Scruggs for assignment (off the 40-man roster).

Trades

July 24	To St. Louis Cardinals Steve Cishek (RHP)	To Miami Marlins Kyle Barraclough (RHP, minors)
July 30	To St. Louis Cardinals Brandon Moss (OF/1B)	To Cleveland Indians Rob Kaminsky (LHP, minors)
July 31	To St. Louis Cardinals Jonathan Broxton (RHP)	To Milwaukee Brewers Malik Collymore (OF, minors)

Miscellaneous transactions

- July 2, 2015: International free agent Álvaro Seijas was signed by the Cardinals to a minor league contract.

== Postseason ==
=== Game log ===
2015 Postseason (1–3)
National League Division Series (1–3)

Game	Date	Opponent	Score	Win	Loss	Save	Attendance	Box
1	October 9	Cubs	4–0	**Lackey** (1–0)	Lester (0–1)	–	47,830	1–0
2	October 10	Cubs	3–6	Wood (1–0)	**García** (0–1)	Rondón (1)	47,859	1–1
3	October 12	@ Cubs	6–8	Arrieta (2–0)	**Wacha** (0–1)	–	42,411	1–2
4	October 13	@ Cubs	4–6	Cahill (1–0)	**Siegrist** (0–1)	Rondón (2)	42,411	1–3

Legend: = Win = Loss = Postponement
Bold = Cardinals team member

=== National League Division Series ===
The Cardinals faced off in a best-of-five series against the rival Chicago Cubs in the postseason for the first time since joining the National League in 1892. The first two games took place at the Cardinals' home venue, Busch Stadium. John Lackey started Game 1 for the Cardinals, opposing Jon Lester, who had both faced St. Louis in the 2013 World Series as members of the Boston Red Sox. Lackey held the Cubs to hitless through the first five innings on the way to pitching 7 1/3 shutout innings in a 4–0 win. Rookies Stephen Piscotty and Tommy Pham both hit their first career postseason home runs. Jaime García, the starter for Game 2, pitched with illness and was ineffective, allowing five unearned runs in just two innings. Two errors, including his own, allowed the Cubs to take an early 5–1 lead. The Cardinals scored all runs on solo home runs from Matt Carpenter, Kolten Wong, and Randal Grichuk.

The series shifted to Wrigley Field, the Cubs' home park, for the next two games. In the third game, the Cubs hit six home runs, and led 8–4 going into the ninth. After Piscotty's two-run home run, the Cardinals trailed by two, but this was the outcome as the Cubs won 8–6. The Cubs also won the final game, 6–4, to move on to the National League Championship Series and end the Cardinals' season. Anthony Rizzo hit his second home run in two days off reliever Kevin Siegrist for the go-ahead run.

=== Postseason rosters ===
Playoff rosters
National League Division Series

- Pitchers: 30 Jonathan Broxton 31 Lance Lynn 33 Carlos Villanueva 41 John Lackey 44 Trevor Rosenthal 46 Kevin Siegrist 50 Adam Wainwright 52 Michael Wacha 54 Jaime García 61 Seth Maness 70 Tyler Lyons
- Catchers: 4 Yadier Molina 48 Tony Cruz
- Infielders: 12 Mark Reynolds 13 Matt Carpenter 16 Kolten Wong 21 Brandon Moss 27 Jhonny Peralta 35 Greg Garcia
- Outfielders: 7 Matt Holliday 15 Randal Grichuk 19 Jon Jay 22 Jason Heyward 55 Stephen Piscotty 60 Tommy Pham

== Statistics ==
=== Batting statistics ===
Legend
Pos	Position	R	Runs scored	HR	Home runs	SB	Stolen bases	AVG	Batting average
G	Games played	H	Hits	RBI	Runs batted in	CS	Caught stealing	OBP	On-base percentage
PA	Plate appearances	2B	Doubles	BB	Bases on balls	HBP	HBP	SLG	Slugging percentage
AB	At bats	3B	Triples	SO	Strikeouts	GIDP	GIDP	OPS	On-base plus slugging percentage

	Key to symbols and categories
**Names**	* – left-handed batter or pitcher; # – switch hitter; Bold: active and on both 25-man roster and 40-man roster; ''₤ – on 40-man roster but not 25-man roster; Italics: on 10-day disabled list (DL) or 60-day DL (§)
**Starting lineup** / **rotation**	Table half above first double line: Appeared in most games at that position or top five pitchers in starts Below double line: Ranked by AB regardless of position for position players / Role, then IP for pitchers
**Statistics**	: Team leader; Bold: Major League Baseball (MLB) leader or tied for lead; **Bold** (non-italicized): American (AL) or National League (NL) leader or tied for lead; ^{†} – top-ten in AL or NL

Pos	Player	G	PA	AB	R	H	2B	3B	HR	RBI	BB	SO	SB	CS	AVG	OBP	SLG	OPS
C	Yadier Molina	136	530	488	34	132	23	2	4	61	32	59	3	1	.270	.310	.350	.660
1B	Mark Reynolds	140	432	382	35	88	21	2	13	48	44	121	2	3	.230	.315	.398	.713
2B	Kolten Wong*	150	613	557	71	146	28	4	11	61	36	95	15	8^{₡}	.262	.321	.386	.707
3B	Matt Carpenter*	154	665	574	101^{₡}	154	**44**	3	28^{₡}	84	81^{₡}	151^{₡}	4	3	.272	.365	.505^{₡}	.841^{₡}
SS	Jhonny Peralta	155	640	579	64	159	26	1	17	71	50	111	1	4	.275	.334	.411	.745
LF	Matt Holliday	73	277	229	24	64	16	1	4	35	39	49	2	1	.279	.394	.410	.804
CF	Peter Bourjos	117	225	195	32	39	8	3	4	11	19	59	5	8^{₡}	.200	.290	.333	.623
RF	Jason Heyward*	154	610	547	79	160	33	4	13	60	56	90	23^{₡}	3	.293	.359	.439	.797
Pos	Player	G	PA	AB	R	H	2B	3B	HR	RBI	BB	SO	SB	CS	AVG	OBP	SLG	OPS
OF	Randal Grichuk	103	350	323	49	89	23	7^{₡}	17	47	22	110	4	2	.276	.329	.548	.877
LF	Stephen Piscotty	63	256	233	29	71	15	4	7	39	20	56	2	1	.305	.359	.494	.853
CF	Jon Jay*	79	245	210	25	44	5	1	1	10	19	36	0	2	.210	.306	.257	.563
1B	Matt Adams*	60	186	175	14	42	9	0	5	24	10	41	1	0	.240	.280	.377	.657
CF	Tommy Pham	52	173	153	28	41	7	5	5	18	19	41	2	0	.268	.347	.477	.824
C	Tony Cruz	69	151	142	6	29	7	1	2	11	6	32	0	0	.204	.235	.310	.545
1B	Brandon Moss*	51	151	132	11	33	7	1	4	8	17	42	0	1	.250	.344	.409	.753
IF	Pete Kozma	76	111	99	15	15	0	0	0	2	10	21	3	1	.152	.236	.152	.388
IF	Greg Garcia*	49	87	75	7	18	5	0	2	4	10	12	0	0	.240	.337	.387	.724
1B	Xavier Scruggs	17	43	42	5	11	2	0	0	7	0	10	1	0	.262	.279	.310	.589
1B	Dan Johnson*	12	21	19	1	3	0	0	0	2	2	4	0	0	.138	.258	.158	.396
C	Cody Stanley*	9	10	10	2	4	1	0	0	3	0	1	0	0	.400	.400	.500	.900
C	Ed Easley	4	7	6	0	0	0	0	0	1	0	1	0	0	.000	.000	.000	.000
C	Travis Tartamella	3	2	2	0	1	0	0	0	0	0	0	0	0	.500	.500	.500	1.000
IF	Dean Anna*	1	1	1	0	0	0	0	0	0	0	0	0	0	.000	.000	.000	.000
Pos	Player	G	PA	AB	R	H	2B	3B	HR	RBI	BB	SO	SB	CS	AVG	OBP	SLG	OPS
P	John Lackey	33	70	62	0	7	2	0	0	3	4	124	0	0	.113	.167	.145	.312
P	Carlos Martínez	32	63	56	2	8	2	0	0	0	1	23	0	0	.143	.172	.179	.351
P	Michael Wacha	30	62	52	5	8	1	0	0	4	4	20	1	0	.154	.214	.173	.387
P	Lance Lynn	31	55	50	3	8	2	0	0	1	0	26	0	0	.160	.160	.200	.360
P	Jaime García*	20	44	41	1	4	0	0	0	1	2	15	0	0	.098	.140	.098	.237
P	Tyler Lyons*	17	20	16	3	3	1	0	0	1	2	4	0	0	.188	.278	.188	.664
P	Tim Cooney*	6	11	10	1	3	1	0	0	0	0	0	0	0	.300	.300	.400	.700
P	Carlos Villanueva	35	11	8	0	0	0	0	0	0	0	5	0	0	.000	.000	.000	.000
P	Adam Wainwright	7	10	10	0	0	0	0	0	0	0	2	0	0	.000	.000	.000	.000
P	Seth Maness	77	3	3	0	0	0	0	0	0	0	2	0	0	.000	.000	.000	.000
P	Randy Choate*	55	1	0	0	0	0	0	0	0	1	0	0	0	—	1.000	—	—
P	Trevor Rosenthal	52	1	1	0	0	0	0	0	0	0	1	0	0	.000	.000	.000	.000
P	Mitch Harris	16	1	1	0	0	0	0	0	0	0	1	0	0	.000	.000	.000	.000
P	Miguel Socolovich	11	1	1	0	0	0	0	0	0	0	0	0	0	.000	.000	.000	.000
**TEAM TOTALS**		**162**	**6139**	**5484**	**647**	**1386**	**288**	**39**	**137**	**619**	**506**	**1267**	**69**	**38**	**.253**	**.321**	**.394**	**.716**
**Rank of 15 teams in NL**				9	11	6	4	4	11		4	6	11	10	6	5	9	8
**Non-pitcher totals**		**162**	**5786**	**5173**	**632**	**1345**	**280**	**39**	**137**	**609**	**492**	**1144**	**68**	**38**	**.260**	**.330**	**.409**	**.738**
**Pitcher totals**		**152**	**353**	**311**	**15**	**41**	**8**	**0**	**0**	**10**	**14**	**123**	**1**	**0**	**.132**	**.172**	**.158**	**.329**
		G	PA	AB	R	H	2B	3B	HR	RBI	BB	SO	SB	CS	AVG	OBP	SLG	OPS

Pos Name G, Pennsylvania, AB, R, H, 2B, 3B, HR, RBI, BB, SO, SB, CS, AVG, OBP, SLG, OPS -->

=== Pitching statistics ===
Legend
Role	Pitcher	G	Games pitched	ShO	Shutouts	HR	Home runs allowed	H/9	Hits per nine innings pitched
W	Wins	GS	Games started	SV	Save	BB	Bases on balls allowed	BB/9	Bases on balls per 9 innings pitched
L	Losses	GF	Games finished	IP	Innings pitched	SO	Strikeouts	SO/9	Strikeouts per 9 innings pitched
ERA	Earned run average	CG	Complete game	H	Hits allowed	WHIP	Walks plus hits per inning pitched	BFP	Batters faced by pitcher

	Key to symbols and categories
**Names**	* – left-handed batter or pitcher; # – switch hitter; Bold: active and on both 25-man roster and 40-man roster; ''₤ – on 40-man roster but not 25-man roster; Italics: on 10-day disabled list (DL) or 60-day DL (§)
**Starting lineup** / **rotation**	Table half above first double line: Appeared in most games at that position or top five pitchers in starts Below double line: Ranked by AB regardless of position for position players / Role, then IP for pitchers
**Statistics**	: Team leader; Bold: Major League Baseball (MLB) leader or tied for lead; **Bold** (non-italicized): American (AL) or National League (NL) leader or tied for lead; ^{†} – top-ten in AL or NL

Role Name W L W-L& ERA G GS GF CG ShO SV IP H HR BB SO WHIP H/9 BB/9 SO/9 BB/9 SO/BB bgcolor="gold"| for leader in category -->

Role	Name	W	L	Win%	ERA	G	GS	GF	CG	ShO	SV	IP	H	HR	BB	SO	WHIP	H/9	BB/9	SO/9	SO/BB
SP	John Lackey	13	10	.565	2.77^{₡}	33	**33**	0	1^{₡}	0	0	218.0^{₡}	211^{₡}	21	53	175	1.183	8.7	2.2	7.2	3.30
SP	Michael Wacha	17^{₡}	7	.708^{₡}	3.38	30	30	0	0	0	0	181.1	162	19	58	153	1.213	8.0	2.9	7.6	2.64
SP	Carlos Martínez	14	7	.667^{₡}	3.01^{₡}	31	29	1	0	0	0	179.2	168	13	63	184	1.286	8.4	3.2	9.2^{₡}	2.92
SP	Lance Lynn	12	11	.522	3.03	31	31	0	0	0	0	175.1	172	13	68^{₡}	167	1.369	8.7	3.5	8.6	2.46
SP	Jaime García*	10	6	.625	2.43	20	20	0	0	0	0	129.2	106	6	30	97	1.049	7.4	2.1	6.7	3.23
Role	Name	W	L	Win%	ERA	G	GS	GF	CG	ShO	SV	IP	H	HR	BB	SO	WHIP	H/9	BB/9	SO/9	SO/BB
CL	Trevor Rosenthal	2	4	.333	2.10	68	0	57^{₡}	0	0	48^{₡}	68.2	62	3	25	83	1.267	8.1	3.3	10.9	3.32
SU	Kevin Siegrist*	7	1	.875	2.17	**81**	0	13	0	0	6	74.2	53	4	34	90	1.165	6.4	4.1	10.8	3.42
MR	Seth Maness	4	2	.667	4.26	76^{₡}	0	13	0	0	3	63.1	77	7	13	46	1.421	10.9	1.8	6.5	3.54
LR	Carlos Villanueva	4	3	.571	2.95	35	0	20	0	0	2	61.0	50	6	21	55	1.164	7.4	3.1	8.1	2.62
MR	Matt Belisle	1	1	.500	2.67	34	0	10	0	0	0	33.2	34	1	15	25	1.455	9.1	4.0	6.7	1.67
Role	Name	W	L	Win%	ERA	G	GS	GF	CG	ShO	SV	IP	H	HR	BB	SO	WHIP	H/9	BB/9	SO/9	SO/BB
SP	Tyler Lyons*	3	1	.750	3.75	17	8	1	0	0	0	60.0	59	12	15	60	1.233	8.9	2.3	9.0	4.00
SP	Tim Cooney*	1	0	1.000	3.16	6	6	0	0	0	0	31.1	28	3	10	29	1.213	8.0	2.9	8.3	2.90
RP	Miguel Socolovich	4	1	.800	1.82	28	0	11	0	0	0	29.2	25	1	10	27	1.180	7.6	3.0	8.2	2.70
SP	Adam Wainwright	2	1	.667	1.61	7	4	0	0	0	0	28.0	25	0	4	20	1.036	8.0	1.3	6.4	5.00
LS	Randy Choate*	1	0	1.000	3.95	71	0	4	0	0	1	27.1	29	2	5	22	1.244	9.5	1.6	7.2	4.40
MR	Mitch Harris	1	1	.500	3.67	26	0	7	0	0	0	27.0	30	4	13	15	1.593	10.0	4.3	5.0	1.15
SU	Jonathan Broxton	3	3	.500	2.66	26	0	5	0	0	0	23.2	20	2	12	26	1.352	7.6	4.6	9.9	2.17
SU	Steve Cishek	0	0	—	2.31	27	0	8	0	0	1	23.1	18	2	13	20	1.329	6.9	5.0	7.7	1.54
RP	Sam Tuivailala	0	1	.000	3.07	10	0	2	0	0	0	14.2	13	2	8	20	1.432	8.0	4.9	13.2	2.50
SU	Jordan Walden	0	1	.000	0.87	12	0	2	0	0	1	10.1	7	0	4	12	1.065	6.1	3.5	10.5	3.00
SP	Marco Gonzales*	0	0	—	13.50	1	1	0	0	0	0	2.2	7	1	1	1	3.000	23.6	3.4	3.4	1.00
RP	Marcus Hatley	0	0	—	0.00	2	0	1	0	0	0	1.1	1	0	2	2	2.250	6.8	13.5	13.5	1.00
RP	Nick Greenwood*	0	1	.000	inf	1	0	1	0	0	0	0.0	2	1	0	0	—	—	—	—	—
**TEAM TOTALS**		**100**	**62**	**.617**	**2.94**	**162**	**162**	**161**	**1**	**0**	**62**	**1464.2**	**1359**	**123**	**477**	**1329**	**1.254**	**8.4**	**2.9**	**8.2**	**2.79**
**Rank of 15 teams in NL**		1	15		1				8	4	1	3	5	2	7	7					
Role	Name	W	L	Win%	ERA	G	GS	GF	CG	ShO	SV	IP	H	HR	BB	SO	WHIP	H/9	BB/9	SO/9	SO/BB

== Records, awards, honors and milestones ==
Records
Performer	Organization	Accomplishment	Date	Ref.
St. Louis Cardinals	St. Louis Cardinals	Opening day record four stolen bases	April 5	
Yadier Molina	St. Louis Cardinals	11 consecutive Opening Day starts as catcher	April 5	
St. Louis Cardinals	St. Louis Cardinals	18 strikeouts while batting	May 13	
Matt Holliday	National League	45-game on-base streak to open a season	June 2	
Mike Matheny	Major League Baseball	Playoff appearances in first four seasons as manager	September 19	
Trevor Rosenthal	St. Louis Cardinals	Single-season saves total (48)	September 28	

Accomplishments
Performer	Organization	Accomplishment	Date	Ref.
St. Louis Cardinals	St. Louis Cardinals	Best start after 25 games (19–6)	since 1900	
Yadier Molina	Major League Baseball	Hit into first-ever 4–5–4 triple play	May 10	
St. Louis Cardinals	Major League Baseball	Fastest team to 50 wins since 2005 Chicago White Sox	June 27	
Randal Grichuk	St. Louis Cardinals	Longest home run of season at Busch Stadium, 448 feet (137 m)	June 30	
St. Louis Cardinals	St. Louis Cardinals	Longest streak of season without home run allowed, 62 innings	August 1–9	
St. Louis Cardinals	St. Louis Cardinals	Longest streak of season without run allowed, 38 innings	August 5–9	
Tyler Lyons	St. Louis Cardinals	First scoreless relief appearance of 5+ IP since 1999	August 13	
Trevor Rosenthal	Major League Baseball	Third-youngest pitcher with back-to-back 40-save seasons	August 26	
Trevor Rosenthal	St. Louis Cardinals	Second pitcher with back-to-back 40-save seasons	August 26	

Major League Baseball All-Star Game selections

Cardinals representing the National League (Primary source:)
Player	Pos.	Sel.	Notes	Ref.
Matt Holliday	OF	7	Voted to start by fans, but did not play due to injury	
Carlos Martínez	RHP	1	Final Vote winner	
Yadier Molina	C	7	Voted by fellow players	
Jhonny Peralta	SS	3	Voted to start by fans	
Trevor Rosenthal	RHP	1	Voted by fellow players, but did not play due to injury	
Michael Wacha	RHP	1	Selected by manager	

Awards

Regular season awards
Performer	Date	Accomplishment	Ref.
Randal Grichuk	2015	Baseball America All-Rookie Team Outfielder	
Matt Carpenter	2015	Baseball America Toolbox Award for Best strike zone judgment (3rd)	
Mike Matheny	2015	Baseball America Toolbox Award for Best manager (2nd)	
Yadier Molina	2015	Baseball America Toolbox Award for Best hit and run artist (1st)	
Yadier Molina	2015	Baseball America Toolbox Award for Best defensive catcher (1st)	
Trevor Rosenthal	2015	Baseball America Toolbox Award for Best reliever (3rd)	
Jason Heyward	2015	Fielding Bible Award at right field	
Adam Wainwright	2015	Hutch Award	
Matt Carpenter	April 12–19	National League Player of the Week	
Jason Heyward	2015	Rawlings Gold Glove Award at right field	
Yadier Molina	2015	Rawlings Gold Glove Award at catcher	
Yadier Molina	2015	Rawlings Platinum Glove Award	
Mitch Harris	2015	Tony Conigliaro Award	
Randal Grichuk	2015	Topps All-Star Rookie at outfield	

Awards voting results: National League Most Valuable Player Award: Carpenter, 12th; Heyward, 15th; Rosenthal 17th. National League Cy Young Award: Lackey, 9th. National League Rookie of the Year Award: Piscotty, 6th. National League Manager of the Year Award: Matheny, 2nd.

Milestones

Regular season milestones
Performer	Accomplishment	Date	Ref.
Lance Lynn	50th career win	April 15	
Kevin Siegrist	1st career save	April 17	
Cody Stanley	1st career hit	April 26	
Mike Matheny	300th career win as manager	May 17	
Matt Carpenter	500th career hit	May 24	
Matt Carpenter	300th career run scored	May 24	
Jaime García	500th career strikeout	June 12	
Tyler Lyons	1st career run batted in	June 19	
Greg Garcia	1st career home run	June 26	
Tommy Pham	1st career hit	July 4	
Tommy Pham	1st career home run	July 5	
Tim Cooney	1st career win	July 24	
Stephen Piscotty	1st career run batted in	July 25	
Matt Carpenter	1st career multi-home run game	July 30	
John Lackey	12th consecutive season with 10+ wins	August 15	
Stephen Piscotty	1st career home run	August 16	
Stephen Piscotty	1st career triple	August 17	
Yadier Molina	100th career home run	August 19	
Stephen Piscotty	1st career multi-home run game	August 23	
Trevor Rosenthal	2nd consecutive season with 40+ saves	August 26	
Jaime García	50th career win	September 5	
Tommy Pham	1st career multi-home run game	September 16	
John Lackey	200 innings pitched for season	September 17	
Travis Tartamella	1st career hit	September 23	

Postseason milestones
Performer	Accomplishment	Date	Ref.
Stephen Piscotty	1st career home run	October 9	
Tommy Pham	1st career home run	October 9	

== Executives and club officials ==
Source: Cardinals front office

Executive officers

- Chairman and chief executive officer: William DeWitt, Jr.
- President: William DeWitt III
- Senior vice president & general counsel: Mike Whittle
- Vice president of business development: Dan Good

Baseball operations department

- Senior vice president of baseball operations / general manager (GM): John Mozeliak
- Assistant general manager: Mike Girsch
- Special assistants to the GM: Ryan Franklin, Mike Jorgensen, Cal Eldred, Willie McGee, and Red Schoendienst
- Director of player development: Gary LaRocque
- Director of player personnel: Matt Slater
- Director of Major League administration: Judy Carpenter-Barada
- Director of baseball administration: John Vuch
- Baseball operations coordinator for player development: Tony Ferreira
- Director of scouting: Randy Flores^{[c]}
- Director of international operations: Moisés Rodríguez
- Assistant director of international scouting: Luís Morales
- Manager for baseball information: Jeremy Cohen
- Baseball development analysts: Matt Bayer, Kevin Seats, Dane Sorensen
- Baseball developers: Pat Casanta, Brian Seyfert
- Additional coaching staff
  - Senior medical advisor: Barry Weinberg
  - Head athletic trainer: Greg Hauck
  - Strength/conditioning coach: Pete Prinzi
  - Equipment manager: Rip Rowan
  - Traveling secretary: C. J. Cherre

Communications department

- Vice president: Ron Watermon
- Director: Brian Bartow

Cardinals Care and community relations department

- Vice president for community relations & executive director for Cardinals Care: Michael Hall
- Vice president for event services and merchandising: Vicki Bryant

Finance and administration department

- Senior vice president and chief financial officer: Brad Wood

Operations department

- Vice president: Joe Abernathy

Ticket sales, marketing & corporate sales department

- Senior vice president of sales & marketing: Dan Farrell

== Minor league system and first-year player draft ==
=== Teams ===
Level	Team	League	Division	Manager	W–L/Stats	Standing	Refs
AAA	Memphis Redbirds	Pacific Coast	American–South	Mike Shildt	73–71	5 GB / 2nd	
AA	Springfield Cardinals	Texas	North	Dann Bilardello	64–76	7 1/2 GB / 3rd	
A+	Palm Beach Cardinals	Florida State	South	Oliver Marmol	75–63 ^{‡}	1/2 GB / 2nd	
A	Peoria Chiefs	Midwest	Western	Joe Kruzel	75–63 ^{¤}	13 GB / 4th	
A (SS)	State College Spikes	New York–Penn	Pinckney	Johnny Rodriguez	41–35	5 GB / 3rd	
Rookie	Johnson City Cardinals	Appalachian	West	Chris Swauger	27–38	11 1/2 GB / 5th	
Rookie	GCL Cardinals	Gulf Coast	East	Steve Turco	**34–25** ^{ƒ}	**– GB / 1st**	
Rookie	DSL Cardinals	Dominican Summer	Boca Chica North	Fray Peniche	34–38	16 GB / 3rd	

‡ – Clinched playoff berth with 43–25 record and first place in second half
¤ – Clinched playoff spot
ƒ – Clinched division title

=== Overview ===
Left-handed starting pitcher Tim Cooney, playing for the Memphis Redbirds of the Pacific Coast League (PCL), was named the PCL Pitcher of the Week after allowing a 0.66 ERA in 13 1/3 IP against the New Orleans Zephyrs and Omaha Storm Chasers. He also held batters to a .143 batting average against (7-for-49). For the week ending June 7, Tyler Lyons, also a left-handed starter playing for Memphis, was named PCL Pitcher of the week after defeating both the Salt Lake Bees and Iowa Cubs. He allowed a 0.00 ERA, 0.54 WHIP and .136 batting average against while striking out 13 in 13 IP.

Right-handed pitcher Alex Reyes was selected to represent the World team in the All-Star Futures Game. Just coming off a 13-strikeout performance on June 17 with the Class A Advanced Palm Beach Cardinals, he led all of the minor leagues with a 13.4 strikeouts per nine innings. For the season, he was 2–5 with a 2.08 ERA, while striking 90 and walking 30 in 60 2/3 IP. Reyes' fastball could reach 100 miles per hour (160 km/h) and he also threw a power curveball. Luís Perdomo, pitching for the Peoria Chiefs of the Midwest League, replaced Reyes in the Futures Game due to injury. Converted from playing outfield after a major league tryout in front of scouts, he totaled 13 starts, a 2.79 ERA, 76 BB and 26 BB in 77 1/3 IP. Jim Callis ranked Reyes as the Cardinals' top prospect for 2015, and the best prospect not to make MLB.com's top 100 list of all professional baseball.

On July 2, reports emerged that the Cardinals had signed five international free agents, including Noel De Jesús (RHP from the Dominican Republic), Raffy Ozuna (shortstop, Dominican Republic), Brian Pirela (RHP, Venezuela), Álvaro Seijas (RHP, Venezuela), and Anthony Trompiz (RHP, Venezuela). At the time, Seijas, 16, was the 11th-ranked international prospect per MLB.com's top 30 list, and received a $762,500 signing bonus. Ozuna, also 16, received a $600,000 signing bonus.

While carrying out a rehabilitation assignment with the Peoria Chiefs on July 23, RHP Jaime García pitched in a combined no-hitter and 2–0 win against the Clinton LumberKings, a Seattle Mariners affiliate. The starter for the game, García pitched the first five innings and struck out six. Steven Sabatino and Cody Schumacher finished the contest.

=== Awards ===
- MLB.com's Cardinals 2015 top 30 prospects list
- **Names in bold** denote player appeared on Cardinals' major league roster in 2015.
- † – both a midseason and postseason All-Star selection

==== All-Star (midseason) selections ====
- Major League Baseball All-Star Futures Game:
  - Luís Perdomo (RHP, Peoria Chiefs) (replaced Reyes)
  - Alex Reyes (RHP, Palm Beach Cardinals) (injured)
- Pacific Coast League (AAA): Box
  - **Tim Cooney** (LHP)
  - **Sam Tuivailala** (RHP)
- Texas League (AA): Box
  - Kyle Barraclough (RHP)
  - Joey Donofrio (RHP)
  - Jeremy Hazelbaker (RF)
  - Michael Ohlman (C)†
  - Arturo Reyes (RHP)†
  - Chris Thomas (RHP)
  - Charlie Tilson (CF)†
- Florida State League (A-Advanced): Box
  - Bruce Caldwell (IF)
  - Alex Reyes (RHP)
  - Luke Voit (DH)
- Midwest League (A): Box
  - Austin Gomber (LHP)†
  - Oscar Mercado (SS)
  - Daniel Poncedeleon (RHP)
  - Luís Perdomo (RHP)

==== All-Star (postseason) selections ====
- Texas League (AA):
  - Michael Ohlman (C)†
  - Arturo Reyes (RHP)†
  - Charlie Tilson (CF)†
- Midwest League (A):
  - Austin Gomber (LHP)†
  - Kyle Grana (RHP)
  - Darren Seferina (2B)

==== Monthly awards ====
- Florida State League Player of the Month:
  - July: Corey Littrell (LHP)
- Texas League Player of the Month:
  - June: Patrick Wisdom (3B)
- Cardinals Minor League Pitcher of the Month:
  - April: Alex Reyes (RHP), Palm Beach
  - May: Luís Perdomo (RHP), Peoria
  - June: Arturo Reyes (RHP)†, Springfield
  - July: Luke Weaver (RHP), Palm Beach
  - August: Austin Gomber, Peoria
- Cardinals Minor League Player of the Month:
  - April: **Xavier Scruggs** (1B), Memphis
  - May: **Greg Garcia** (IF)
  - June: Patrick Wisdom (3B)
  - July: Anthony Garcia (OF), Springfield

==== Weekly awards ====
- Pitcher of the Week:
  - Will Anderson (RHP): May 4, Florida State League
  - **Tim Cooney** (RHP): May 17, Pacific Coast League
  - Thomas Lee (RHP) − 2×: May 10 and June 7, Texas League
  - **Tyler Lyons** (LHP): June 7, Pacific Coast League
  - Jimmy Reed (LHP): May 25, Florida State League
  - Arturo Reyes (RHP)†: June 7, Texas League
- Player of the Week:
  - Harrison Bader (OF): August 31, Midwest League
  - Jeremy Hazelbaker (OF): July 13, Pacific Coast League
  - Michael Ohlman (C): June 7, Texas League
  - Nick Thompson (OF): August 24, Midwest League
  - Patrick Wisdom (3B): June 15, Texas League

==== Baseball America All-Star Awards ====
- Minor League Classification All-Star Teams
  - High Class-A pitcher: Alex Reyes
  - High Class-A pitcher: Luke Weaver
  - Short season Class-A pitcher: Jacob Evans
  - Rookie leagues pitcher: Ryan Helsley

==== Baseball America Annual Toolbox Awards ====
- Pacific Coast League
  - Best strike zone judgment: **Greg Garcia** (2B)
  - Best control: **Tim Cooney** (LHP)
  - Best reliever: **Sam Tuivailala** (RHP)
  - Best defensive outfielder: **Tommy Pham** (CF)
- Texas League
  - Best defensive first baseman: Jonathan Rodriguez (1B)
- Florida State League
  - Best pitching prospect: Alex Reyes (RHP)
  - Best fastball: Alex Reyes (RHP)
  - Best breaking pitch: Alex Reyes (RHP)

==== Rawlings Gold Glove Award ====
- Rawlings Gold Glove Award for minor league catchers: Carson Kelly

==== St. Louis Cardinals minor league system awards ====
- Minor League Player of the Year: Stephen Piscotty (OF)
- Minor League Pitchers of the Year: Austin Gomber (LHP) & Alex Reyes (RHP)

=== Major League Baseball draft ===
The Cardinals selected a total of 42 players in the annual 40-round draft that took place from June 8–10 in Secaucus, New Jersey. The club's first pick of the draft, and 23rd overall, was outfielder Nick Plummer from Brother Rice High School in Michigan. He was the first high school player from Michigan taken in the first round since 1997. The Cardinals acceded him with a $2.124 million signing bonus. The Cardinals also signed each of the following selectees of the first ten rounds: Jake Woodford (RHP, 1A), Jordan Hicks (RHP, third round), Paul DeJong (LF, fourth), Ryan Helsley, (RHP, fifth), Andrew Brodbeck, (2B ninth), and others in the later rounds. Other selections notified the Cardinals of their intention to continue playing college baseball: Kép Brown (10th round), Gio Brusa (23rd), Matt Vierling (30th) and Parker Kelly (34th).

Names in bold indicate the player was signed. Sources:

2015 St. Louis Cardinals complete draft list

Round	Pick	Name	Position	School	Location	Note
1	23	**Nick Plummer**	OF	Brother Rice High School	Lathrup Village, Michigan	Signed with $2.124 million bonus
CB A	39	**Jake Woodford**	RHP	Henry B. Plant High School	Tampa, Florida	Signed with $1.8 million bonus
2	66	**Bryce Denton**	3B	Ravenwood High School	Brentwood, Tennessee	Signed with $1.2 million bonus
3	100	**Harrison Bader**	OF	University of Florida	Gainesville, Florida	Signed for $400,000
Sup	105	**Jordan Hicks**	RHP	Cypress Creek High School	Harris County, Texas	Signed for $600,000
4	131	**Paul DeJong**	3B	Illinois State University	Normal, Illinois	Signed for $200,000
5	161	**Ryan Helsley**	RHP	Northeastern State University	Tahlequah, Oklahoma	Signed for $225,000
6	191	**Jacob Evans**	LHP	University of Oklahoma	Norman, Oklahoma	Signed for $150,000
7	221	**Jason Jenner**	C	University of San Diego	San Diego, California	Signed for $10,000
8	251	**Ian Oxnevad**	LHP	Shorewood High School	Shoreline, Washington	Signed for $500,000
9	281	**Andrew Brodbeck**	2B	Flagler College	St. Augustine, Florida	Signed for $5,000
10	311	Kép Brown	CF	Wando High School	Mount Pleasant, South Carolina	Did not sign
11		**Paul Salazar**	RHP	Lutheran South Academy	Houston, Texas	Signed
12		**Jacob Schlesener**	LHP	Logan-Rogersville High School	Rogersville, Missouri	Signed
13		**Craig Aiken**	CF	University of Oklahoma	Norman, Oklahoma	Signed
14		**Carson Cross**	RHP	University of Connecticut	Storrs, Connecticut	Signed
15		**Ryan Merrill**	SS	Iowa Western Community College	Council Bluffs, Iowa	Signed
16		**Max Almonte**	RHP	Villanova University	Villanova, Pennsylvania	Signed
17		**Chris Chinea**	C	Louisiana State University	Baton Rouge, Louisiana	
18		Josh Rolette	C	Shawnee High School	Shawnee, Oklahoma	
19		**Ryan McCarvel**	C	Howard College	Big Spring, Texas	Signed
20		**Luke Doyle**	2B	Yavapai College	Prescott, Arizona	Signed
21		Cadyn Grenier	SS	Bishop Gorman High School	Summerlin, Nevada	
22		**Hunter Newman**	1B	Trevecca Nazarene University	Nashville, Tennessee	Signed
23		Gio Brusa	RF	University of the Pacific	Stockton, California	Did not sign
24		**Daniel Martin**	2B	Azusa Pacific University	Azusa, California	
25		Kyle Molnar	RHP	Aliso Niguel High School	Aliso Viejo, California	
26		**Brennan Leitao**	RHP	California State University, Sacramento	Sacramento, California	
27		Greg Tomchick	RHP	Old Dominion University	Norfolk, Virginia	
28		Mitchell Traver	RHP	Texas Christian University	Fort Worth, Texas	
29		**Ben Yokley**	RHP	Air Force	El Paso County, Colorado	Signed
30		Matt Vierling	OF	Christian Brothers College HS	St. Louis, Missouri	Did not sign
31		Aaron Coates	LHP	Glasgow High School	Newark, Delaware	
32		**Thomas Spitz**	CF	Wingate University	North Carolina	
33		**Chandler Hawkins**	LHP	Arkansas State University	Jonesboro, Arkansas	Signed
34		Parker Kelly	RHP	Westview High School	Portland, Oregon	Did not sign
35		**Luke Harrison**	RHP	Indiana University	Bloomington, Indiana	
36		**Dylan Tice**	2B	West Chester University	West Chester, Pennsylvania	Signed
37		**Stephen Zavala**	C	Whittier College	Whittier, California	Signed
38		**Orlando Olivera**	OF	Missouri Baptist University	Creve Coeur, Missouri	Signed
39		**R. J. Dennard**	1B	Armstrong State University	Savannah, Georgia	
40		**Joseph Hawkins**	SS	Missouri State University	Springfield, Missouri	Signed

Non-drafted free agents signed

Name	Position	School	Location	Notes
**Brady Bowen**	LHP	Friends University	Wichita, Kansas	
**Riley Drongesen**	C	Menlo College	Atherton, California	
**Josh Swirchak**	INF	Wilmington University	New Castle, Delaware	
