= 2014 St. Louis Cardinals season =

Major League Baseball season

2014 St. Louis Cardinals
- National League Central champions
- League: National League
- Division: Central
- Ballpark: Busch Stadium
- City: St. Louis, Missouri
- Record: 90–72 (.556)
- Divisional place: 1st
- Owners: William DeWitt, Jr. Fred Hanser
- General managers: John Mozeliak
- Managers: Mike Matheny
- Television: Fox Sports Midwest (Dan McLaughlin, Al Hrabosky, Rick Horton, Tim McCarver)
- Radio: KMOX (1120AM); St. Louis Cardinals Radio Network (Mike Shannon, John Rooney, Al Hrabosky, Rick Horton, Mike Claiborne)
- Stats: ESPN.com; Baseball Reference

The 2014 St. Louis Cardinals season was the 133rd season for the St. Louis Cardinals, a Major League Baseball franchise in St. Louis, Missouri. It was the 123rd season for the Cardinals in the National League and their 9th at Busch Stadium III. The Cardinals entered 2014 as the defending NL champions.

Ballpark Village opened on March 27, with a first phase completion of 120,000 square feet (11,000 m^{2}), and was considered a smashing success. Located inside Ballpark Village, the franchise announced the opening of the Hall of Fame Museum, with an inaugural induction class of 22 members. Ownership purchased the club's top minor league affiliate, the Memphis Redbirds on March 28. Forbes listed the Cardinals as the eighth-most valuable franchise in Major League Baseball at $820 million, and their $65.2 million operating income was the highest of all 30 MLB franchises.

They finished the season with a record of 90–72 and finished first in the National League Central for the second straight year. They defeated the Los Angeles Dodgers in the NLDS, 3 games to 1 to advance to their fourth consecutive NLCS, where they played San Francisco Giants for the second time in three seasons. They lost in five games to the Giants and were eliminated.

== Acquisitions, departures and roster moves ==
The day after the 2013 World Series ended, October 31, a total of five Cardinals players became free agents: outfielder Carlos Beltrán, starting pitcher Chris Carpenter, shortstop Rafael Furcal, relief pitcher Edward Mujica, and starting pitcher Jake Westbrook.

=== Ownership and club officials ===
- December 30, 2013: Promoted Gary LaRocque to franchise farm director.
- December 30: Promoted Chris Correa to director of baseball development.
- December 30: Appointed Tony Ferreira to assist LaRocque.
- December 30: Appointed John Vuch as director of baseball administration.
- December 30: Promoted Linda Brauer to senior administrative assistant to the general manager.
- December 30: Expanded Matt Slater's role as the team's director of player personal to oversee the Cardinals' "new initiative of emerging markets".
- January 8, 2014: Received clearance to purchase their AAA Minor League Baseball franchise affiliate, the Memphis Redbirds, from the Memphis Redbirds Foundation (MRF).
- March 28, 2014: The deal to purchase the Memphis Redbirds was finalized.
- April 12: Extended general manager (GM) and senior vice president (SVP) John Mozeliak for two additional years through the 2018 season. It was the second extension in two years. He had served in this position since October 2007. If he will have served the length of the extension, he would have become the third-longest tenured GM in franchise history, surpassed only by Bing Devine (18 years, two stints), and Walt Jocketty (14 years).

=== Management and coaches ===
- November 7, 2013: Promoted Tim Leveque to minor league pitching coordinator, Dann Bilardello to manage the Palm Beach Cardinals of the Florida State League, and Joe Kruzel to manage the Peoria Chiefs of the Midwest League. Reassigned Johnny Rodríguez to manage the Johnson City Cardinals of the Appalachian League.
- November 12: Assistant hitting coach Bengie Molina accepted a position as a first base coach and catching instructor with the Texas Rangers.
- November 20: Extended manager Mike Matheny's contract by three years through 2017.
- December 17: Hired David Bell to be the assistant hitting coach.

=== Broadcasters ===
- December 8, 2013: Agreed to terms with Tim McCarver to comment for telecasts in 30 select games in 2014.
- January 13, 2014: Agreed to terms with Mike Shannon for a minimum extension of two years, exact length not specified.

=== Hitters ===
- October 31, 2013: Right fielder Carlos Beltrán and shortstop Rafael Furcal filed for free agency.
- November 5: Outrighted outfielders Adron Chambers, Brock Peterson, and catcher Rob Johnson from the 40-man roster to the minor leagues, making them free agents.
- November 5: Extended a qualifying offer (QO) of $14.1 million and one year to Beltrán.
- November 9: Beltrán officially declined the QO.
- November 18: Signed free agent infielder Scott Moore and catcher Ed Easley and assigned them to the AAA Memphis Redbirds, and invited them as non-roster players to the major league spring training camp.
- November 22: Traded third baseman David Freese and relief pitcher Fernando Salas to the Los Angeles Angels for outfielders Peter Bourjos and Randal Grichuk.
- November 24: Signed free agent shortstop Jhonny Peralta to a four-year deal through 2017 worth $53 million total. It started with $15.5 million in 2014, $15 million, $12.5 million and finally $10 million in 2017. Without a qualifying offer from the Detroit Tigers, the Cardinals were not required to return a first-round draft pick.
- December 16: Signed second baseman Mark Ellis to a one-year contract on December 15 for $5.25 million, plus an additional $1 million in incentives.
- January 6, 2014: Claimed outfielder Rafael Ortega off waivers from the Texas Rangers.
- March 7: Signed infielder Aledmys Díaz to a four-year contract worth $8 million.

=== Pitchers ===
- October 31, 2013: Right-handed starting pitcher (RHP) Chris Carpenter and right-handed relief pitcher Edward Mujica filed for free agency.
- October 31: Declined team option on RHP Jake Westbrook for $9.5 million and bought it out for $1 million, making him a free agent.
- November 20: Chris Carpenter announced his retirement as a player.
- November 22: Traded reliever Fernando Salas and third baseman David Freese to the Los Angeles Angels for outfielders Peter Bourjos and Randal Grichuk.
- December 2: Declined to tender relief pitcher John Axford, making him a free agent.
- December 11: Signed free agent minor league reliever Ángel Castro to a one-year contract and added him to the 40-man roster.
- February 6, 2014: Signed free agent reliever Pat Neshek to a minor league contract with an invite to spring training.
- March 26: Signed free agent reliever David Aardsma to a minor league contract and an invite to spring training.

== Other offseason events ==
=== Purchase of the Memphis Redbirds ===
Having already purchased three of their minor league affiliates, Cardinals ownership reached an agreement in principle to purchase the Memphis Redbirds AAA Minor League Baseball franchise from the Memphis Redbirds Foundation (MRF) on November 16. The city of Memphis purchased AutoZone Park, the Redbirds' home stadium, from MRF and agreed to lease it to the Cardinals and perform upgrades. The Memphis City Council (MCC) initially set December 3 as the date to vote on the move. They also intended to finalize it by the end of the year.

After debating for almost four hours on the proposal on December 9, the vote was delayed for eight additional days because of concerns of certain financial aspects of the deal. The original proposal stated the Cardinals would cover at least $15 million in stadium improvements to AutoZone Park and pay $300,000 annually in rent to the city. Operating costs of the franchise and the stadium were to become the responsibility of the Cardinals. The lease was to assure the Redbirds of remaining in Memphis through the 2030 season. Two five-year renewal options were included with the principal 17-year lease.

The Cardinals were officially cleared to acquire the Memphis Redbirds on January 7, 2014, after MCC approved the plan by an 8-4 vote. The deals included the city purchasing AutoZone Park by issuing $24 million in city-backed bonds. The deal was finalized on March 28; the Cardinals acquired the Redbirds franchise and Memphis acquired the ballpark and began leasing it to the Cardinals. In addition to the Redbirds, the team already owned its Double-A affiliate in Springfield, high Class A affiliate, and rookie level clubs in Jupiter, Florida.

=== Chris Carpenter's retirement ===
Chris Carpenter, winner of the franchise's only Cy Young Award besides two won by Bob Gibson, announced his retirement on November 20 after posting a 95-44 (.683) over nine seasons as a Cardinal. He lost nearly three entire seasons to injuries, but garnered a reputation for coming back from them to play. He won the Cy Young in 2005, when he was 21–5. In each of his full seasons, he won at least 11 games. He finished his major league career with a 144–94 (.605) record; and a 3.76 earned run average (ERA). In 18 post-season starts, he was 10–4 with a 3.00 ERA.

Mozeliak, who announced Carpenter's decision during a news conference, said the club offered him the opportunity to remain with the franchise in an off-field capacity, although it was unclear at the time what that role would be.

=== Tickets ===
In December, the Cardinals announced they were raising season ticket prices an average of 4.1%. They also added new sections of seats and carved up the area of seats behind home plate and between first and third base and split the tiers in the outfield bleachers. The 330 seats in the overlook deck at Ballpark Village also opened for 2014, but were not yet for sale before the start of the season and were not made available in 2014 to season-ticket holders.

Season-ticket holders, who purchased half of the seats in Busch Stadium, constituted 83% of season tickets. Annually, season-ticket holders renewed at a percentage in the low 90s. 57% of season tickets prices increased by $1 per game. Individual game tickets go on sale February 28, 2014.

=== Other personnel changes ===
David Bell, hired as the assistant hitting coach to replace Bengie Molina, was previously an infielder with the Cardinals from 1995 to 1998. He was the fourth assistant hitting coach in the past four years. All other members of the coaching staff returned in 2014.

The Cardinals broadcast team retained the services of Mike Shannon for a minimum of two more years. Shannon has broadcast since 1972, making 2014 his 42nd year. It was also his 56th year as part of the organization, including nine years as a player from 1962 to 1970. He was again paired with John Rooney on KMOX, who will work with Rick Horton and Al Hrabosky when Shannon is absent. Hrabosky and Horton are members of the Cardinals' FOX Sports Midwest television team.

=== Reopening of the Cardinals Hall of Fame and inaugural induction class ===
On January 18, chairman William DeWitt, Jr., announced the reopening of the St. Louis Cardinals Hall of Fame Museum with a formal annual selection process. A "Red Ribbon" committee of Cardinals baseball experts plus an annual fan vote will decide three inductees per year. For the inaugural class of 2014, the Cardinals announced the following 22 members to be inducted in a ceremony on August 16:

- Jim Bottomley
- Ken Boyer
- Lou Brock
- Jack Buck
- August A. "Gussie" Busch, Jr.
- Dizzy Dean
- Frank Frisch
- Bob Gibson
- Chick Hafey
- Jesse Haines
- Whitey Herzog
- Rogers Hornsby
- Tony La Russa
- Joe Medwick
- Johnny Mize
- Stan Musial
- Branch Rickey
- Red Schoendienst
- Enos Slaughter
- Ozzie Smith
- Billy Southworth
- Bruce Sutter

Four more Cardinals were voted into the Cardinals Hall of Fame on an eight-player fan ballot announced on April 30. Those eight nominees had to be with the team for at least three years and retired from baseball for at least three years. Those not voted in by the fans in an online March vote that received almost 80,000 votes over seven-weeks were: Bob Forsch, Keith Hernandez, Mark McGwire, Matt Morris, Ted Simmons and Joe Torre. To be inducted on August 16 along with the 22 above are: player-broadcaster Mike Shannon, outfielders Jim Edmonds and Willie McGee, and shortstop Marty Marion.

In addition, the National Baseball Hall of Fame and Museum announced the inductions of former Cardinals managers La Russa and Joe Torre.

== Spring training ==
=== Schedule and media ===
The club announced its 27-game schedule on November 25, 2013. Pitchers and catchers reported by Feb. 12, 2014, and the position players reported by Feb. 17, with the whole team scheduling its first workout on Feb. 18. The Grapefruit League opened on Feb. 28, starting against the Miami Marlins. Two scheduled off-days were Tue. March 4, and Tue. Mar. 18. They ended spring training with an exhibition game on Fri. Mar. 28 against their AAA-farm team, the Memphis Redbirds, at Memphis, Tennessee. It will be the first baseball event at the AutoZone Park with the Cardinals owning the team, if the Memphis City Council approves the agreement in December 2013, which was delayed until the 8-4 vote in favor on January 7, 2014. There were 14 home games at Roger Dean Stadium and 13 games away, with 3 of those as the 'visiting' team against the stadium's co-tenants, the aforementioned Miami Marlins. All games at Roger Dean Stadium started at 12:05 pm CT. This was the 17th season at Roger Dean Stadium since they left Al Lang Field at St. Petersburg, Florida after March 1997.

Fox Sports Midwest will broadcast 15 games of the 27 games on its schedule, an increase of five more than in 2013, and 10 more than in 2012. ESPN has already picked up the Cardinals' March 17 road game against the Boston Red Sox. In total, 22 of the Cards' 28 spring games will be available on either local TV or radio (KMOX). Last year, only four teams had as many as 15 spring games televised in their local market.

=== Openings ===
Kolten Wong, the top second-base prospect in the organization, was expected to compete for the major league starting position. By signing Mark Ellis, the Cardinals saw signing the right-hander as a low-risk backup for Wong and good fit for the team. His league-adjusted on-base plus slugging ratio of 116 against left-handed pitching strengthened the weakness against left-handed pitching the Redbirds dealt with the season before. He hit .270 with a .323 on-base percentage in 106 games with the L.A. Dodgers in 2013, and hit .282 against lefties. Wong won the starting role.

The team reassigned outfield prospect Oscar Taveras to minor league camp after efforts for him fully recover from ankle surgery produced mixed results.

== Regular season ==
=== March–April ===
The Cardinals opened their regular season at Great American Ball Park against the Cincinnati Reds on March 31. Adam Wainwright, making his third Opening Day start, won his 100th career game in a 1–0 defeat of the Reds. It was also his first win on Opening Day. On April 14, the Cardinals ended the Milwaukee Brewers' nine-game winning streak behind Lance Lynn's seven scoreless innings. Entering the game with a 6.55 earned run average (ERA), Lynn won his third decision behind 11 strikeouts and just three hits and three walks allowed. Jhonny Peralta and Jon Jay each homered in the 4–0 victory. Three days later, Wainwright continued his strong start for the season at Nationals Park with a two-hit complete game shutout in an 8-0 defeat of the Washington Nationals. He gave up the first hit in the second inning with a high infield chopper, but none until after two outs in the ninth. In his seventh career shutout, Wainwright walked three and struck out eight.

Former Cardinals' catcher and longtime television broadcaster for the Fox network Tim McCarver, called his first game of his scheduled 30 for the Cardinals on April 28, against the Milwaukee Brewers on Fox Sports Midwest, partnered with Dan McLaughlin.

With a 12-1 record in April in a total of 15 starts in his career, Lance Lynn is in a class in major league baseball history of only him and Babe Ruth for that month, with only Ruth having a better first-month winning percentage. In marked contrast to his April, his August record for the past two seasons (2012 and 2013) is 1-5 with a 5.75 ERA. His 37 wins since the start of the 2012 season is second in the National League only to teammate Adam Wainwright, who has only one more win during that span. Lynn's run support is typically the highest of the five regular starters, and after his May 4 start is second with 4.6 runs per game to Wainwright's 5.3.

=== May ===
The three-game series finale against the Pirates on May 11, marked the end of a road-heavy start to the season with 26 of the first 38 games away from Busch Stadium. Not since 1927, have the Cardinals had that many road games after the first 38 played. Prior to the game they were 11-14 (after, 12-14) in road games, and 7-5 at home.

The 4-1 win on May 17 featured four bunt hits, two by Kolten Wong and two by Peter Bourjos. It was only the second time in the 2010s that a team did that, and the first time since the Detroit Tigers did it on September 23, 2003. Lefthanded pitcher Jaime García will make his first start on May 18, since having shoulder surgery to repair a torn labrum and rotator cuff in late May 2013. His last major league start was May 17, 2013 vs. MIL, a 7-6 win in which he pitched 5.1 innings allowing all six runs.

Adam Wainwright threw the first one-hitter of his career on May 20, against the Arizona Diamondbacks. It was his eighth career shutout, walking none and striking out nine. Paul Goldschmidt was the only baserunner, getting a double in the fourth inning off the centerfield wall after Wainwright had retired the first 11 batters. After the hit, he retired the next 16 consecutive batters, facing only 28 batters which is one over the minimum for a perfect game. He threw 115 pitches, 86 for strikes. He becomes the second seven-game winner in the National League as he notched his 106th career victory (against 59 losses), tying him for eighth all-time in Cardinals' history with Slim Sallee.

Three days after starter Jaime García made his first start in over a year, reliever Jason Motte made his return on May 21, throwing 15 pitches over 1.2 innings after a 19-month absence (October 2012) after Tommy John surgery.

Thirteen former Cardinals held a 50th anniversary reunion of their 1964 championship in conjunction with the visiting New York Yankees team at Busch Stadium on May 26, for the first time since 2005. The 1964 Cardinals beat the Yankees in the World Series that year. The 13 players paraded around Busch Stadium prior to the game with the Yankees. Dick Groat was the oldest living player of the 13 to attend, now at 83. Bob Gibson threw out the ceremonial first pitch to his longtime battermate, catcher Tim McCarver. Gibson, then 28, and Lou Brock, then 25 on June 18 (traded for on June 15 that year for pitcher Ernie Broglio), are in the Hall of Fame. Red Schoendienst, then a coach, in 1965 named the manager, along with current Cardinals' broadcaster Mike Shannon, plus Julián Javier, Jerry Buchek, Phil Gagliano, Ron Taylor, Gordie Richardson, Bob Humphreys, Charlie James, and Carl Warwick were the others attending.

Adam Wainwright was named the NL Co-Players of the Week for May 19–25, along with Josh Beckett, 34, for their superb pitching. Beckett threw the season's first no-hitter on May 25, and was 2-0 for the week with a 2.57 ERA. Wainwright had the same won-loss record but boasted a 0.00 ERA, and led the Major Leagues with 21 strikeouts, 1 walk in 17 IP with nine strikeouts coming in his one-hitter shutout, and the other 12 in eight scoreless innings. He became the first NL pitcher to get to eight wins, and currently leads all Major League starting pitchers with a 1.67 ERA.

In the middle game of the three-game series with the New York Yankees on May 27, Lance Lynn threw his first complete game and first shutout, in a 6-0 win. He had started 74 games previously before throwing his five-hit shutout gem. He walked three and struck out only two, but avoided his typical one bad inning in many prior starts, throwing a career high 126 pitches. The losing pitcher on the Yankees was native St. Louisan David Phelps, now 1-2, from Hazelwood, Missouri, pitching in his home park for the first time. Lynn won his 40th career win against 20 losses for a sterling .667 winning percentage, and a 3.72 ERA. The Cardinals were the first team in the Major Leagues with three six-game winners: Lynn (6), Wainwright (8), and Shelby Miller (6). The nine shutouts tied the Texas Rangers for the lead in that category.

The #2 Prospect in all of MLB, outfielder Oscar Taveras, 21, was recalled to the majors for the first time after the May 30 game, with Matt Adams placed on the 15-day disabled list. He was promptly placed in the lineup on May 31 at home, batting sixth, playing right field. He was hitting .325/.373/.524 at Memphis, with 7 HR, 40 RBI, in 49 G and 191 ABs.

On a Saturday afternoon May 31, 2014, Taveras, in his second career at bat (after a fly out) with one out in the bottom of the fifth inning, recorded his first career hit, a home run to right field against San Francisco Giants' starter Yusmeiro Petit, in the rain which immediately afterward forced the first rain delay (47 min., later a 51 min. delay) of the game. He struck out in his third at-bat, but the Cardinals won 2-0.

Despite the win on May 31, the team hit only 11 HRs in May, compared to 19 in March/April, for a total of only 30, ranking 15th and last in the NL. The Cardinals did hit better in May with a .266 BA compared to .246 in March/April. With Runners-in-Scoring-Position, they hit .256 in May compared to a pitiful .226 in March/April. They scored an average of 4.2 runs/game in May compared to 3.6 in March/April. The Starters' ERA ballooned to 3.74 in May compared to 2.48 in March/April, and the Relievers' ERA also increased to 4.06 in May compared to 3.73 in March/April, according to a graphic shown on Fox Sports Midwest after the May 31 game.

=== June ===
The team won in 11 innings against Kansas City at Kauffman Stadium on June 4 for a 31-29 (.517) won-loss record, bringing them to four games back of the Milwaukee Brewers. This happened after suffering a blown 6–0 lead in an eventual 8–7 loss in St. Louis on June 3, after a humiliating 6–0 shutout loss the night before in getting only three hits. Matt Carpenter got his fifth hit, a double, his second of the game in the top of the inning that drove in the go-ahead run in the eventual 5-2 win after a Trevor Rosenthal blown save attempt for Adam Wainwright in the bottom of the ninth with a 2-0 lead and no outs. Wainwright would have been the first nine-game winner in the NL, but remained tied for the lead with eight. Mark Buehrle (Toronto Blue Jays) led the majors with 10 wins. It was the first five-hit game of Carpenter's career, and with a walk, a perfect night. His average jumped from .292 to .307, 11th in the NL. He was hitting only .256 on May 17, but his 14-game hitting streak (ended on June 2), plus his two-game hit streak since, added 51 points. His .395 on-base average (7th in NL) was the same as his slugging percentage. Carpenter became the first Cardinals' player to record a five-hit game since Ryan Ludwick on September 4, 2009. He led the NL with 73 hits, was fifth with 40 runs scored, and eighth in doubles with 16. Pat Neshek got his first major league save in 255 games.

The team turned a triple play against the Toronto Blue Jays off the bat of José Bautista at Rogers Centre in the sixth inning on June 6. It was the first in nine years (May 5, 2005) for the Cardinals, against the San Diego Padres.

The pitchers threw three consecutive scoreless games June 7–8, and 10, giving them 13 for the season in leading the majors. It was the most in franchise history after 65 games, beating the 1968 Cardinals who had 11 at that point while on their way to an NL-leading 30.

Double-A Springfield Cardinals sensational starting LH-pitcher Marco Gonzales, the club's #4 prospect in the minors, a standout for his changeup and his command (3-2, 2.33 ERA in 7 G, 38.2 IP, 33 H, 2 HR, 10 W, 46 SO), made the long jump to make his major league debut on June 25, at Coors Field against the Colorado Rockies, near where he grew up in Fort Collins. He pitched five innings, facing 24 batters, giving up seven hits, two walks, a home run, and five runs, while striking out three, including two in the first inning, including NL-batting leader Troy Tulowitzki (.353). He doubled in his first at-bat, and scored the game's first run. Leaving after five innings with the team trailing 5-1, the team rallied for five runs over the last three innings, and won the game, 9-6 with Pat Neshek getting his second win of the season. The game was the first for the Cardinals since 1980 to receive four sacrifice flies. Gonzales became the first Cardinals' starter to make his debut without playing at the Triple A level since Cliff Politte in April 1998.

At the half-way point of the season on June 27, after 81 games the Cardinals were 44-37 (.543) with 306 runs scored, and 274 runs allowed. In the previous year (2013), the Cardinals scored 783 runs, with 596 runs allowed.

=== July ===
On July 2, Adam Wainwright became the NL's first 11-game winner, pitching 7.2 innings in shutting out the San Francisco Giants at AT&T Park, 2-0, giving up only four hits all singles, walking two, but striking out only one in the seventh inning. He also lowered his ERA from 2.01 to 1.89 taking the NL-lead on that category after 124 innings for the season. The start was Wainwright's eighth scoreless of 17 total starts against opponents going at least seven innings.

Starting pitcher Jaime García announced on July 5 that he would have season-ending surgery to correct the thoracic outlet syndrome condition. It is the same nerve condition that caused the end of former pitcher Chris Carpenter's career with the Cardinals.

== Season standings ==
=== National League Central ===
NL Central
| Team | W | L | Pct. | GB | Home | Road |
|---|---|---|---|---|---|---|
| St. Louis Cardinals | 90 | 72 | .556 | — | 51‍–‍30 | 39‍–‍42 |
| Pittsburgh Pirates | 88 | 74 | .543 | 2 | 51‍–‍30 | 37‍–‍44 |
| Milwaukee Brewers | 82 | 80 | .506 | 8 | 42‍–‍39 | 40‍–‍41 |
| Cincinnati Reds | 76 | 86 | .469 | 14 | 44‍–‍37 | 32‍–‍49 |
| Chicago Cubs | 73 | 89 | .451 | 17 | 41‍–‍40 | 32‍–‍49 |

=== National League Wild Card ===
Division leaders
| Team | W | L | Pct. |
|---|---|---|---|
| Washington Nationals | 96 | 66 | .593 |
| Los Angeles Dodgers | 94 | 68 | .580 |
| St. Louis Cardinals | 90 | 72 | .556 |

Wild Card teams (Top 2 teams qualify for postseason)
| Team | W | L | Pct. | GB |
|---|---|---|---|---|
| Pittsburgh Pirates | 88 | 74 | .543 | — |
| San Francisco Giants | 88 | 74 | .543 | — |
| Milwaukee Brewers | 82 | 80 | .506 | 6 |
| New York Mets | 79 | 83 | .488 | 9 |
| Atlanta Braves | 79 | 83 | .488 | 9 |
| Miami Marlins | 77 | 85 | .475 | 11 |
| San Diego Padres | 77 | 85 | .475 | 11 |
| Cincinnati Reds | 76 | 86 | .469 | 12 |
| Philadelphia Phillies | 73 | 89 | .451 | 15 |
| Chicago Cubs | 73 | 89 | .451 | 15 |
| Colorado Rockies | 66 | 96 | .407 | 22 |
| Arizona Diamondbacks | 64 | 98 | .395 | 24 |

=== Record vs. opponents ===
2014 National League record Source: MLB Standings Grid – 2014
| Team | AZ | ATL | CHC | CIN | COL | LAD | MIA | MIL | NYM | PHI | PIT | SD | SF | STL | WSH | AL |
|---|---|---|---|---|---|---|---|---|---|---|---|---|---|---|---|---|
| Arizona | – | 3–3 | 5–2 | 3–4 | 9–10 | 4–15 | 3–4 | 3–4 | 2–4 | 2–4 | 3–4 | 12–7 | 6–13 | 1–5 | 1–6 | 7–13 |
| Atlanta | 3–3 | – | 5–1 | 5–2 | 4–3 | 1–6 | 9–10 | 5–2 | 9–10 | 11–8 | 3–4 | 3–4 | 1–5 | 2–4 | 11–8 | 7–13 |
| Chicago | 2–5 | 1–5 | – | 8–11 | 5–2 | 3–4 | 4–2 | 11–8 | 5–2 | 3–3 | 5–14 | 3–4 | 2–4 | 9–10 | 3–4 | 9–11 |
| Cincinnati | 4–3 | 2–5 | 11–8 | – | 3–4 | 3–4 | 4–3 | 10–9 | 2–4 | 3–3 | 12–7 | 1–5 | 5–2 | 7–12 | 3–3 | 6–14 |
| Colorado | 10–9 | 3–4 | 2–5 | 4–3 | – | 6–13 | 3–4 | 1–6 | 3–4 | 3–3 | 2–4 | 10–9 | 10–9 | 1–5 | 1–5 | 7–13 |
| Los Angeles | 15–4 | 6–1 | 4–3 | 4–3 | 13–6 | – | 3–3 | 1–5 | 4–2 | 3–4 | 2–5 | 12–7 | 10–9 | 4–3 | 2–4 | 11–9 |
| Miami | 4–3 | 10–9 | 2–4 | 3–4 | 4–3 | 3–3 | – | 3–4 | 8–11 | 9–10 | 2–4 | 3–4 | 3–4 | 4–2 | 6–13 | 13–7 |
| Milwaukee | 4–3 | 2–5 | 8–11 | 9–10 | 6–1 | 5–1 | 4–3 | – | 4–3 | 3–4 | 12–7 | 3–3 | 2–4 | 7–12 | 2–4 | 11–9 |
| New York | 4–2 | 10–9 | 2–5 | 4–2 | 4–3 | 2–4 | 11–8 | 3–4 | – | 13–6 | 3–4 | 3–3 | 1–6 | 4–3 | 4–15 | 11–9 |
| Philadelphia | 4–2 | 8–11 | 3–3 | 3–3 | 3–3 | 4–3 | 10–9 | 4–3 | 6–13 | – | 1–6 | 4–3 | 2–5 | 4–3 | 10–9 | 7–13 |
| Pittsburgh | 4–3 | 4–3 | 14–5 | 7–12 | 4–2 | 5–2 | 4–2 | 7–12 | 4–3 | 6–1 | – | 3–3 | 4–2 | 8–11 | 3–4 | 11–9 |
| San Diego | 7–12 | 4–3 | 4–3 | 5–1 | 9–10 | 7–12 | 4–3 | 3–3 | 3–3 | 3–4 | 3–3 | – | 10–9 | 3–4 | 3–4 | 9–11 |
| San Francisco | 13–6 | 5–1 | 4–2 | 2–5 | 9–10 | 9–10 | 4–3 | 4–2 | 6–1 | 5–2 | 2–4 | 9–10 | – | 4–3 | 2–5 | 10–10 |
| St. Louis | 5–1 | 4–2 | 10–9 | 12–7 | 5–1 | 3–4 | 2–4 | 12–7 | 3–4 | 3–4 | 11–8 | 4–3 | 3–4 | – | 5–2 | 8–12 |
| Washington | 6–1 | 8–11 | 4–3 | 3–3 | 5–1 | 4–2 | 13–6 | 4–2 | 15–4 | 9–10 | 4–3 | 4–3 | 5–2 | 2–5 | – | 10–10 |

== Schedule and results ==
=== Game log ===
The Cardinals, and all 30 teams, had their schedules released by Major League Baseball on September 10, 2013.
The Cardinals' Opening Day game will be away against the Cincinnati Reds on March 31. It will be broadcast on ESPN along with others that day.

Regular Season Schedule (calendar style)
Regular Season Schedule (sortable text)
National Broadcast Schedule (all teams), EDT

All game times below are in Central Time Zone.
All games are broadcast on Fox Sports Midwest, unless otherwise noted.

Past games legend
| Cardinals Win (#bbffbb) | Cardinals Loss (#ffbbbb) | Game postponed (#bbbbbb) |
Boldface text denotes a Cardinals pitcher

Future Games Legend
| Home Game (#add8e6) | Away Game |
Please be sure to replace the home/away background color with the appropriate win/loss/postponement background color (see "Past Games Legend") when entering a completed game in the game log.

St. Louis Cardinals 2014 Season Game Log — Season Record: 90–72 (.556) — Home: 51–30 — Road: 39–42
March/April: 15–14 (.517) — Home: 7–5 — Road: 8–9

| # | Date | Opponent / Time | Score | Win | Loss | Save | Attendance | Record |
|---|---|---|---|---|---|---|---|---|
| 1 | March 31 | @ Reds 3:10 pm ESPN | 1–0 | **Wainwright** (1–0) | Cueto (0–1) | **Rosenthal** (1) | 43,134 | 1–0 Archived April 7, 2014, at the Wayback Machine |
| 2 | April 2 | @ Reds 6:10 pm | 1–0 | Hoover (1-0) | **Martínez** (0-1) | | 36,189 | 1–1 Archived April 7, 2014, at the Wayback Machine |
| 3 | April 3 | @ Reds 11:35 am | 7–6 | **Lynn** (1-0) | Bailey (0-1) | **Rosenthal** (2) | 16,857 | 2–1 Archived April 7, 2014, at the Wayback Machine |
| 4 | April 4 | @ Pirates 6:05 pm | 12–2 | Cole (1–0) | **Miller** (0–1) | | 23,342 | 2–2 Archived April 7, 2014, at the Wayback Machine |
| 5 | April 5 | @ Pirates 6:05 pm | 6–1 | **Kelly** (1-0) | Liriano (0-1) | | 30,092 | 3–2 Archived April 7, 2014, at the Wayback Machine |
| 6 | April 6 | @ Pirates 12:35 pm | 2–1 | Watson (1-0) | **Wainwright** (1-1) | Grilli (1) | 25,704 | 3–3 Archived April 7, 2014, at the Wayback Machine |
| 7 | April 7 | Reds 3:15 pm | 5–3 | **Wacha** (1-0) | Cingrani (0-1) | | 47,492 | 4–3 Archived April 8, 2014, at the Wayback Machine |
| 8 | April 8 | Reds 7:15 pm | 7–5 | **Lynn** (2-0) | Ondrusek (0-1) | **Rosenthal** (3) | 40,672 | 5–3 Archived April 13, 2014, at the Wayback Machine |
| 9 | April 9 | Reds 12:45 pm | 4–0 | Leake (1-1) | **Miller** (0-2) | | 41,137 | 5–4 Archived April 13, 2014, at the Wayback Machine |
| 10 | April 11 | Cubs 7:15 pm | 6–3 (11) | Grimm (1-0) | **Rosenthal** (0-1) | Rondón (1) | 43,903 | 5–5 Archived April 13, 2014, at the Wayback Machine |
| 11 | April 12 | Cubs 1:15 pm | 10–4 | **Wainwright** (2-1) | Villanueva (1-3) | | 45,302 | 6–5 Archived April 13, 2014, at the Wayback Machine |
| 12 | April 13 | Cubs 1:15 pm | 6–4 | **Wacha** (2-0) | Jackson (0-1) | **Rosenthal** (4) | 44,135 | 7–5 Archived April 14, 2014, at the Wayback Machine |
| 13 | April 14 | @ Brewers 7:10 pm | 4–0 | **Lynn** (3-0) | Garza (0-2) | | 27,090 | 8–5 Archived April 16, 2014, at the Wayback Machine |
| 14 | April 15 | @ Brewers 7:10 pm | 6–1 | **Miller** (1-2) | Estrada (1-1) | | 27,470 | 9–5 Archived April 16, 2014, at the Wayback Machine |
| 15 | April 16 | @ Brewers 12:10 pm | 5–1 | Peralta (2-0) | **Kelly** (1-1) | | 26,668 | 9–6 Archived April 17, 2014, at the Wayback Machine |
| 16 | April 17 | @ Nationals 6:05 pm | 8–0 | **Wainwright** (3-1) | Jordan (0-2) | | 28,987 | 10–6 Archived April 19, 2014, at the Wayback Machine |
| 17 | April 18 | @ Nationals 6:05 pm | 3–1 | Gonzalez (3-1) | **Wacha** (2-1) | Soriano (4) | 31,237 | 10–7 Archived April 19, 2014, at the Wayback Machine |
| 18 | April 19 | @ Nationals 12:05 pm | 4–3 | **Lynn** (4-0) | Zimmermann (1-1) | **Rosenthal** (5) | 41,084 | 11–7 Archived April 20, 2014, at the Wayback Machine |
| 19 | April 20 | @ Nationals 12:35 pm | 3–2 | Soriano (1-0) | **Maness** (0-1) | | 27,653 | 11–8 Archived April 21, 2014, at the Wayback Machine |
| 20 | April 21 | @ Mets 6:10 pm | 2–0 | Mejía (3-0) | **Lyons** (0-1) | Farnsworth (1) | 20,382 | 11–9 Archived March 4, 2016, at the Wayback Machine |
| 21 | April 22 | @ Mets 6:10 pm | 3–0 | **Wainwright** (4-1) | Gee (1-1) | **Rosenthal** (6) | 20,220 | 12–9 Archived March 4, 2016, at the Wayback Machine |
| 22 | April 23 | @ Mets 6:10 pm | 3–2 | Niese (1-2) | **Wacha** (2-2) | Farnsworth (2) | 21,981 | 12–10 Archived April 24, 2014, at the Wayback Machine |
| 23 | April 24 | @ Mets 12:10 pm | 4–1 | Colón (2-3) | **Lynn** (4-1) | Matsuzaka (1) | 22,669 | 12–11 Archived April 24, 2014, at the Wayback Machine |
| 24 | April 25 | Pirates 7:15 pm | 1–0 | **Miller** (2-2) | Cole (2-2) | **Rosenthal** (7) | 43,193 | 13–11 Archived April 26, 2014, at the Wayback Machine |
| 25 | April 26 | Pirates 3:05 pm | 6–1 | Pimentel (2-0) | **Lyons** (0-2) | | 46,254 (SRO) | 13–12 Archived April 27, 2014, at the Wayback Machine |
| 26 | April 27 | Pirates 1:15 pm | 7–0 | **Wainwright** (5-1) | Vólquez (1-2) | | 41,986 | 14–12 Archived April 28, 2014, at the Wayback Machine |
| 27 | April 28 | Brewers 7:15 pm | 5–3 (12) | Duke (2-0) | **Maness** (0-2) | Rodríguez (12) | 40,514 | 14–13 Archived April 29, 2014, at the Wayback Machine |
| 28 | April 29 | Brewers 7:15 pm | 5–4 (11) | Thornburg (3-0) | **Siegrist** (0-1) | Rodríguez (13) | 40,531 | 14–14 Archived May 2, 2014, at the Wayback Machine |
| 29 | April 30 | Brewers 12:45 pm | 9–3 | **Miller** (3-2) | Garza (1-3) | | 40,783 | 15–14 Archived May 2, 2014, at the Wayback Machine |

May: 15–12 (.556) — Home: 9–6 — Road: 6–6

| # | Date | Opponent / Time | Score | Win | Loss | Save | Attendance | Record |
|---|---|---|---|---|---|---|---|---|
| 30 | May 2 | @ Cubs 1:20 pm | 6–5 | Wood (2-3) | **Wainwright** (5-2) | Rondon (2) | 28,160 | 15–15 Archived March 4, 2016, at the Wayback Machine |
| 31 | May 3 | @ Cubs 12:05 pm | 3–0 | Schlitter (1-0) | **Wacha** (2-3) | Rondon (3) | 37,874 | 15–16 Archived May 4, 2014, at the Wayback Machine |
| 32 | May 4 | @ Cubs 7:05 pm ESPN | 5–4 | **Siegrist** (1-1) | Rondon (0-1) | **Rosenthal** (8) | 30,023 | 16–16 Archived May 5, 2014, at the Wayback Machine |
| 33 | May 5 | @ Braves 6:10 pm | 4–3 | **Miller** (4-2) | Harang (3-3) | **Rosenthal** (9) | 20,048 | 17–16 Archived May 6, 2014, at the Wayback Machine |
| 34 | May 6 | @ Braves 6:10 pm | 2–1 | Carpenter (2-0) | **Choate** (0-1) | Kimbrel (9) | 18,413 | 17–17 Archived May 8, 2014, at the Wayback Machine |
| 35 | May 7 | @ Braves 6:10 pm | 7–1 | **Wainwright** (6-2) | Minor (0-2) | | 21,796 | 18–17 Archived May 8, 2014, at the Wayback Machine |
| 36 | May 9 | @ Pirates 6:05 pm | 6–4 | Wilson (1-0) | **Martinez** (0-2) | Melancon (3) | 33,696 | 18–18 Archived May 12, 2014, at the Wayback Machine |
| 37 | May 10 | @ Pirates 6:05 pm | 4–3 | Hughes (2-1) | **Lynn** (4-2) | Melancon (4) | 34,914 | 18–19 Archived May 12, 2014, at the Wayback Machine |
| 38 | May 11 | @ Pirates 7:05 pm ESPN | 6–5 | **Miller** (5-2) | Morton (0-5) | **Rosenthal** (10) | 32,065 | 19–19 Archived May 12, 2014, at the Wayback Machine |
| 39 | May 12 | Cubs 7:10 pm | 17–5 | Wood (3-4) | **Lyons** (0-3) | | 44,434 | 19–20 Archived May 13, 2014, at the Wayback Machine |
| 40 | May 13 | Cubs 7:15 pm | 4–3 (12) | **Maness** (1-2) | Grimm (1-2) | | 43,627 | 20–20 Archived May 14, 2014, at the Wayback Machine |
| -- | May 14 | Cubs 7:15 pm | PPD, RAIN; rescheduled for 1st game on Aug. 30 | | | | | |
| 41 | May 15 | Cubs 12:45 pm | 5–3 | **Wacha** (3-3) | Hammel (4-2) | **Rosenthal** (11) | 42,501 | 21–20 Archived May 17, 2014, at the Wayback Machine |
| 42 | May 16 | Braves 7:15 pm | 5–2 | **Lynn** (5-2) | Santana (4-1) | **Rosenthal** (12) | 43,701 | 22–20 Archived May 17, 2014, at the Wayback Machine |
| 43 | May 17 | Braves 1:15 pm | 4–1 | **Miller** (6-2) | Harang (4-4) | **Rosenthal** (13) | 44,981 | 23–20 Archived May 18, 2014, at the Wayback Machine |
| 44 | May 18 | Braves 1:15 pm | 6–5 | Carpenter (3-0) | **Rosenthal** (0-2) | Kimbrel (11) | 44,278 | 23–21 Archived May 19, 2014, at the Wayback Machine |
| 45 | May 20 | D'backs 7:15 pm | 5–0 | **Wainwright** (7-2) | Arroyo (4-3) | | 42,252 | 24–21 Archived May 21, 2014, at the Wayback Machine |
| 46 | May 21 | D'backs 7:15 pm | 3–2 (12) | **Maness** (2-2) | Cahill (1-6) | | 40,542 | 25–21 Archived May 22, 2014, at the Wayback Machine |
| 47 | May 22 | D'backs 6:15 pm | 4–2 | **Neshek** (1-0) | Miley (3-5) | **Rosenthal** (14) | 40,787 | 26–21 Archived May 23, 2014, at the Wayback Machine |
| 48 | May 23 | @ Reds 6:10 pm | 5–3 | Bailey (4-3) | **Miller** (6-3) | Chapman (4) | 37,271 | 26–22 Archived May 24, 2014, at the Wayback Machine |
| 49 | May 24 | @ Reds 6:15 pm Fox | 6–3 | **García** (1-0) | Cingrani (2-4) | **Rosenthal** (15) | 41,585 | 27-22 Archived May 25, 2014, at the Wayback Machine |
| 50 | May 25 | @ Reds 7:05 pm ESPN | 4–0 | **Wainwright** (8-2) | Leake (2-4) | | 42,273 | 28-22 Archived May 27, 2014, at the Wayback Machine |
| 51 | May 26 | Yankees 3:15 pm ESPN / Fox Sports Midwest | 6–4 (12) | Aceves (1-2) | **Choate** (0-2) | Robertson (11) | 47,311 | 28-23 Archived May 27, 2014, at the Wayback Machine |
| 52 | May 27 | Yankees 7:15 pm | 6–0 | **Lynn** (6-2) | Phelps (1-2) | | 45,202 | 29-23 Archived May 29, 2014, at the Wayback Machine |
| 53 | May 28 | Yankees 7:15 pm | 7–4 | Kuroda (4-3) | **Miller** (6-4) | Robertson (12) | 45,267 | 29-24 Archived May 29, 2014, at the Wayback Machine |
| 54 | May 29 | Giants 7:15 pm | 6–5 | Lopez (1-0) | **Martinez** (0-3) | Romo (17) | 41,337 | 29-25 Archived March 4, 2016, at the Wayback Machine |
| 55 | May 30 | Giants 7:15 pm | 9–4 | Bumgarner (7-3) | **Wainwright** (8-3) | | 43,107 | 29-26 |
| 56 | May 31 | Giants 1:15 pm | 2–0 | **Wacha** (4-3) | Petit (8-3) | **Rosenthal** (16) | 44,426 | 30-26 Archived October 6, 2014, at the Wayback Machine |

June: 14–13 (.519) — Home: 7–6 — Road: 7–7

| # | Date | Opponent / Time | Score | Win | Loss | Save | Attendance | Record |
|---|---|---|---|---|---|---|---|---|
| 57 | June 1 | Giants 1:15 pm | 8–0 | Hudson (6-2) | **Lynn** (6-3) | | 42,734 | 30-27 Archived June 2, 2014, at the Wayback Machine |
| 58 | June 2 | Royals 7:10 pm | 6–0 | Duffy (3-5) | **Miller** (6-5) | | 41,239 | 30-28 Archived June 7, 2014, at the Wayback Machine |
| 59 | June 3 | Royals 6:15 pm | 8–7 | Davis (5-1) | **Rosenthal** (0-3) | Holland (16) | 41,192 | 30-29 Archived June 7, 2014, at the Wayback Machine |
| 60 | June 4 | @ Royals 7:10 pm | 5–2 (11) | **Freeman** (1-0) | Herrera (1-2) | **Neshek** (1) | 22,126 | 31-29 Archived March 4, 2016, at the Wayback Machine |
| 61 | June 5 | @ Royals 7:10 pm | 3–2 | Ventura (3-5) | **Wacha** (4-4) | Holland (17) | 24,438 | 31-30 Archived June 7, 2014, at the Wayback Machine |
| 62 | June 6 | @ Blue Jays 6:07 pm | 3–1 | Stroman (3-0) | **Lynn** (6-4) | Janssen (11) | 33,528 | 31-31 Archived July 14, 2014, at the Wayback Machine |
| 63 | June 7 | @ Blue Jays 12:07 pm | 5–0 | **Miller** (7-5) | Buehrle (10-2) | | 42,981 | 32-31 Archived July 14, 2014, at the Wayback Machine |
| 64 | June 8 | @ Blue Jays 12:07 pm | 5–0 | **García** (2-0) | Hutchison (4-4) | | 45,726 | 33-31 Archived August 31, 2014, at the Wayback Machine |
| 65 | June 10 | @ Rays 6:10 pm | 1–0 | **Wainwright** (9-3) | Odorizzi (2-7) | **Rosenthal** (17) | 17,226 | 34-31 Archived July 14, 2014, at the Wayback Machine |
| 66 | June 11 | @ Rays 6:10 pm | 6–3 | Oviedo (2-2) | **Wacha** (4-5) | Balfour (10) | 15,930 | 34-32 Archived March 4, 2016, at the Wayback Machine |
| 67 | June 13 | Nationals 7:15 pm | 1–0 | **Lynn** (7-4) | Zimmermann (5-3) | **Rosenthal** (18) | 41,519 | 35-32 Archived July 14, 2014, at the Wayback Machine |
| 68 | June 14 | Nationals 6:15 pm Fox | 4–1 | **Choate** (1–2) | Strasburg (6-5) | **Rosenthal** (19) | 44,785 | 36-32 Archived July 14, 2014, at the Wayback Machine |
| 69 | June 15 | Nationals 1:15 pm | 5–2 | **García** (3–0) | Fister (5-2) | **Rosenthal** (20) | 45,325 | 37-32 Archived March 4, 2016, at the Wayback Machine |
| 70 | June 16 | Mets 7:10 pm | 6–2 | **Greenwood** (1–0) | DeGrom (0-4) | | 42,808 | 38-32 Archived August 31, 2014, at the Wayback Machine |
| 71 | June 17 | Mets 7:15 pm | 5–2 | **Wacha** (5–5) | Niese (3-4) | **Neshek** (2) | 42,209 | 39-32 Archived August 31, 2014, at the Wayback Machine |
| 72 | June 18 | Mets 12:45 pm | 3–2 | Colón (7–5) | **Lynn** (7-5) | Eveland (1) | 42,221 | 39-33 Archived March 3, 2016, at the Wayback Machine |
| 73 | June 19 | Phillies 7:15 pm | 4–1 | Buchanan (3–3) | **Miller** (7-6) | Papelbon (17) | 42,106 | 39-34 Archived March 4, 2016, at the Wayback Machine |
| 74 | June 20 | Phillies 7:15 pm | 5–1 | Burnett (5–6) | **García** (3-1) | | 44,061 | 39-35 Archived July 15, 2014, at the Wayback Machine |
| 75 | June 21 | Phillies 3:10 pm | 4–1 | **Wainwright** (10–3) | Hamels (2-4) | **Rosenthal** (21) | 44,789 | 40-35 Archived March 4, 2016, at the Wayback Machine |
| 76 | June 22 | Phillies 1:15 pm | 5–3 | **Martinez** (1–3) | Kendrick (3-7) | **Rosenthal** (22) | 43,484 | 41-35 Archived August 30, 2014, at the Wayback Machine |
| 77 | June 23 | @ Rockies 7:40 pm | 8–0 | **Lynn** (8–5) | Chacín (1-6) | | 37,078 | 42-35 Archived July 22, 2014, at the Wayback Machine |
| 78 | June 24 | @ Rockies 7:40 pm | 10–5 | de la Rosa (7–6) | **Greenwood** (1-1) | | 34,554 | 42-36 Archived March 3, 2016, at the Wayback Machine |
| 79 | June 25 | @ Rockies 2:10 pm | 9–6 | **Neshek** (2–0) | Ottavino (0-3) | **Rosenthal** (23) | 34,635 | 43-36 Archived July 3, 2014, at the Wayback Machine |
| 80 | June 26 | @ Dodgers 9:10 pm | 1–0 | Wilson (1–2) | **Wainwright** (10-4) | Jansen (24) | 48,624 | 43-37 Archived March 3, 2016, at the Wayback Machine |
| 81 | June 27 | @ Dodgers 9:10 pm | 3–1 | **Maness** (3–2) | Ryu (9-4) | **Rosenthal** (24) | 48,159 | 44-37 Archived March 4, 2016, at the Wayback Machine |
| 82 | June 28 | @ Dodgers 6:15 pm Fox | 9–1 | Greinke (10–4) | **Lynn** (8-6) | | 50,910 | 44-38 Archived March 4, 2016, at the Wayback Machine |
| 83 | June 29 | @ Dodgers 3:10 pm | 6–0 | Kershaw (9-2) | **Miller** (7-7) | | 47,739 | 44-39 Archived July 15, 2014, at the Wayback Machine |

July: 13–11 (.542) — Home: 6–6 — Road: 7–5

| # | Date | Opponent / Time | Score | Win | Loss | Save | Attendance | Record |
|---|---|---|---|---|---|---|---|---|
| 84 | July 1 | @ Giants 9:15 pm | 5–0 | Lincecum (7-5) | **Gonzales** (0-1) | | 41,152 | 44-40 Archived July 14, 2014, at the Wayback Machine |
| 85 | July 2 | @ Giants 9:15 pm | 2–0 | **Wainwright** (11-4) | Vogelsong (5-5) | **Rosenthal** (25) | 41,321 | 45-40 Archived July 14, 2014, at the Wayback Machine |
| 86 | July 3 | @ Giants 2:45 pm | 7–2 | **Martinez** (2-3) | Bumgarner (9-6) | | 41,181 | 46-40 Archived July 14, 2014, at the Wayback Machine |
| 87 | July 4 | Marlins 6:15 pm | 3–2 | **Lynn** (9-6) | Eovaldi (5-4) | **Rosenthal** (26) | 46,131 | 47-40 Archived July 14, 2014, at the Wayback Machine |
| 88 | July 5 | Marlins 1:15 pm | 6–5 | Dunn (6-4) | **Rosenthal** (0-4) | Cishek (19) | 45,445 | 47-41 Archived July 14, 2014, at the Wayback Machine |
| 89 | July 6 | Marlins 1:15 pm | 8–4 | Álvarez (6-3) | **Gonzales** (0-2) | | 42,160 | 47-42 Archived July 14, 2014, at the Wayback Machine |
| 90 | July 7 | Pirates 7:15 pm | 2–0 | **Neshek** (3-0) | Wilson (2-1) | | 42,448 | 48-42 Archived July 27, 2014, at the Wayback Machine |
| 91 | July 8 | Pirates 7:15 pm | 5–4 | **Rosenthal** (1-4) | Frieri (1-4) | | 43,162 | 49-42 Archived July 27, 2014, at the Wayback Machine |
| 92 | July 9 | Pirates 7:15 pm | 5–2 | **Lynn** (10-6) | Cumpton (3-3) | **Rosenthal** (27) | 43,941 | 50-42 Archived July 27, 2014, at the Wayback Machine |
| 93 | July 10 | Pirates 6:15 pm | 9–1 | Vólquez (8-6) | **Miller** (7-8) | | 43,974 | 50-43 Archived July 27, 2014, at the Wayback Machine |
| 94 | July 11 | @ Brewers 7:10 pm | 7–6 | **Neshek** (4-0) | Rodríguez (3-3) | **Rosenthal** (28) | 35,501 | 51-43 Archived July 27, 2014, at the Wayback Machine |
| 95 | July 12 | @ Brewers 3:10 pm | 10–2 | **Wainwright** (12-4) | Nelson (1-1) | | 40,198 | 52-43 Archived July 27, 2014, at the Wayback Machine |
| 96 | July 13 | @ Brewers 1:10 pm | 11–2 | Peralta (10-6) | **Martinez** (2-4) | | 35,345 | 52-44 Archived July 27, 2014, at the Wayback Machine |
| -- | July 15 | 85th All-Star Game | National League 3, American League 5 (Minneapolis; Target Field) | | | | | |
| 97 | July 18 | Dodgers 7:15 pm | 3–2 | **Lynn** (11-6) | Haren (8-7) | **Rosenthal** (29) | 45,010 | 53-44 Archived July 27, 2014, at the Wayback Machine |
| 98 | July 19 | Dodgers 3:05 pm | 4–2 | **Kelly** (2-1) | Greinke (11-6) | **Rosenthal** (30) | 43,922 | 54-44 Archived July 27, 2014, at the Wayback Machine |
| 99 | July 20 | Dodgers 7:05 pm | 4–3 | Howell (2-3) | **Rosenthal** (1-5) | Jansen (28) | 45,255 | 54-45 Archived July 27, 2014, at the Wayback Machine |
| 100 | July 22 | Rays 7:15 pm | 7–2 | Odorizzi (6-8) | **Wainwright** (12-5) | | 43,623 | 54-46 Archived July 27, 2014, at the Wayback Machine |
| 101 | July 23 | Rays 6:15 pm | 3–0 | Cobb (6-6) | **Lynn** (11-7) | McGee (9) | 43,564 | 54-47 Archived July 27, 2014, at the Wayback Machine |
| 102 | July 25 | @ Cubs 3:05 pm | 7–6 | Grimm (3-2) | **Siegrist** (1-2) | Rondón (12) | 41,534 | 54-48 Archived July 27, 2014, at the Wayback Machine |
| 103 | July 26 | @ Cubs 3:05 pm | 6–3 | **Choate** (2-2) | Russell (0-2) | **Rosenthal** (31) | 41,927 | 55-48 Archived July 27, 2014, at the Wayback Machine |
| 104 | July 27 | @ Cubs 1:20 pm | 1–0 | **Wainwright** (13-5) | Kendricks (1-1) | **Rosenthal** (32) | 35,256 | 56-48 Archived July 28, 2014, at the Wayback Machine |
| 105 | July 29 | @ Padres 10:10 pm | 1–3 | **Ross** (10-10) | Lynn (11-8) | **Benoit** (3) | 33,521 | 56-49 Archived March 3, 2016, at the Wayback Machine |
| 106 | July 30 | @ Padres 10:10 pm | 1–12 | **Hahn** (7-2) | Kelly (2-2) | | 30,973 | 56-50 Archived October 6, 2014, at the Wayback Machine |
| 107 | July 31 | @ Padres 2:40 pm | 6–2 | **Miller** (8-8) | Despaigne (2-3) | | 28,820 | 57-50 Archived October 6, 2014, at the Wayback Machine |

August: 16–13 (.552) — Home: 12–5 — Road: 4–8

| # | Date | Opponent / Time | Score | Win | Loss | Save | Attendance | Record |
|---|---|---|---|---|---|---|---|---|
| 108 | August 1 | Brewers 7:15 pm | 4-7 | Peralta (13-6) | **Wainwright** (13-6) | Rodriguez (32) | 45,306 | 57-51 Archived September 9, 2014, at the Wayback Machine |
| 109 | August 2 | Brewers 6:15 pm | 9-7 | **Masterson** (5-6) | Lohse (11-6) | **Rosenthal** (33) | 45,719 | 58-51 Archived September 9, 2014, at the Wayback Machine |
| 110 | August 3 | Brewers 1:15 pm | 3-2 | **Lackey** (12-7) | Jeffress (0-1) | **Rosenthal** (34) | 44,662 | 59-51 Archived September 9, 2014, at the Wayback Machine |
| 111 | August 5 | Red Sox 7:15 pm | 3-2 | **Neshek** (5-0) | Tazawa (0-3) | **Rosenthal** (35) | 43,432 | 60-51 Archived September 9, 2014, at the Wayback Machine |
| 112 | August 6 | Red Sox 7:15 pm | 1-2 | Tazawa (1-3) | **Rosenthal** (1-6) | Uehara (23) | 42,733 | 60-52 Archived September 9, 2014, at the Wayback Machine |
| 113 | August 7 | Red Sox 6:15 pm | 5-2 | **Wainwright** (14-6) | Workman (1-5) | **Neshek** (3) | 44,570 | 61-52 Archived September 9, 2014, at the Wayback Machine |
| 114 | August 8 | @ Orioles 6:05 pm | 2-12 | Tillman (9-5) | **Masterson** (5-7) | | 43,743 | 61-53 Archived September 13, 2014, at the Wayback Machine |
| 115 | August 9 | @ Orioles 3:05 pm | 3-10 | Jiménez (4-8) | **Lackey** (12-8) | | 40,894 | 61-54 Archived September 13, 2014, at the Wayback Machine |
| 116 | August 10 | @ Orioles 12:35 pm | 8-3 | **Lynn** (12-8) | Gausman (6-4) | | 27,779 | 62-54 Archived September 13, 2014, at the Wayback Machine |
| 117 | August 11 | @ Marlins 6:10 pm | 5-6 | Koehler (8-9) | **Miller** (6-4) | **Cishek** (30) | 21,144 | 62-55 Archived September 13, 2014, at the Wayback Machine |
| 118 | August 12 | @ Marlins 6:10 pm | 0-3 | Cosart (10-8) | **Wainwright** (14-7) | **Dunn** (1) | 22,703 | 62-56 Archived September 13, 2014, at the Wayback Machine |
| 119 | August 13 | @ Marlins 6:10 pm | 5-2 | **Masterson** (6-7) | Eovaldi (6-7) | | 20,044 | 63-56 Archived September 13, 2014, at the Wayback Machine |
| 120 | August 14 | Padres 7:15 pm | 4-3 | **Maness** (4-2) | Torres (1-1) | **Rosenthal** (36) | 45,126 | 64-56 Archived September 13, 2014, at the Wayback Machine |
| 121 | August 15 | Padres 7:15 pm | 4-2 | **Lynn** (13-8) | Ross (11-11) | **Neshek** (4) | 42,662 | 65-56 Archived September 13, 2014, at the Wayback Machine |
| 122 | August 16 | Padres 6:15 pm | 5-9 | Torres (2-1) | **Siegrist** (1-3) | | 44,079 | 65-57 Archived September 13, 2014, at the Wayback Machine |
| 123 | August 17 | Padres 1:15 pm | 7-6 | **Wainwright** (15-7) | Despaigne (3-4) | **Maness** (2) | 43,149 | 66-57 Archived September 13, 2014, at the Wayback Machine |
| 124 | August 18 | Reds 7:15 pm | 6-5 | **Greenwood** (2-1) | Ondrusek (3-3) | | 42,973 | 67-57 Archived September 13, 2014, at the Wayback Machine |
| 125 | August 19 | Reds 7:15 pm | 5-4 | **Neshek** (6-0) | Hoover (1-10) | | 42,573 | 68-57 Archived September 13, 2014, at the Wayback Machine |
| 126 | August 20 | Reds 6:15 pm | 7-3 | **Lynn** (14-8) | Cueto (15-7) | **Rosenthal** (37) | 43,085 | 69-57 Archived September 13, 2014, at the Wayback Machine |
| 127 | August 22 | @ Phillies 6:05 pm | 4-5 | Kendrick (6-11) | **Wainwright** (15-8) | Papelbon (31) | 28,366 | |
| 128 | August 23 | @ Phillies 6:05 pm | 6-5 | **Maness** (5-2) | Giles (2-1) | **Rosenthal** (38) | 30,352 | |
| 129 | August 24 | @ Phillies 12:35 pm | 1-7 | Williams (2-0) | **Masterson** (2-2) | | 30,580 | |
| 130 | August 25 | @ Pirates 6:05 pm | 3-2 | **Lackey** (2-1) | Hughes (6-4) | **Rosenthal** (39) | 24,532 | |
| 131 | August 26 | @ Pirates 6:05 pm | 2-5 | Waston (9-1) | **Maness** (5-3) | Melancon (23) | 25,521 | |
| 132 | August 27 | @ Pirates 11:35 am | 1-3 | Locke (6-3) | **Wainwright** (15-9) | Melancon (24) | 29,905 | |
| 133 | August 29 | Cubs 7:15 pm | 2-7 | Ramírez (2-1) | **Neshek (6-1)** | | 43,181 | |
| 134 | August 30 | Cubs 1:15 pm | 1-5 | Doubront (1-0) | **Masterson** (2-3) | | 44,755 | |
| 135 | August 30 | Cubs 7:15 pm | 13-2 | **Gonzales** (1-2) | Wada (4-2) | | 44,762 | |
| 136 | August 31 | Cubs 1:15 pm | 9-6 | **Neshek (7-1)** | Villanueva (5-7) | **Rosenthal** (40) | 45,148 | |

September: 17–9 (.654) — Home: 10–2 — Road: 7–7

| # | Date | Opponent / Time | Score | Win | Loss | Save | Attendance | Record |
|---|---|---|---|---|---|---|---|---|
| 137 | September 1 | Pirates 1:15 pm | 5-4 | **Maness** (6-3) | Cole (7-5) | **Rosenthal** (41) | 43,347 | 74-63 Archived September 9, 2014, at the Wayback Machine |
| 138 | September 2 | Pirates 7:15 pm | 6-4 | **Wainwright** (16-9) | Locke (6-4) | **Neshek** (5) | 43,693 | 75-63 Archived September 9, 2014, at the Wayback Machine |
| 139 | September 3 | Pirates 12:45 pm | 1-0 | **Rosenthal** (2-6) | Melancon (2-4) | | 42,864 | 76-63 Archived September 9, 2014, at the Wayback Machine |
| 140 | September 4 | @ Brewers 7:10 pm | 3-2 | **Gonzales** (2-2) | Peralta (15-10) | **Rosenthal** (42) | 37,227 | 77-63 Archived September 9, 2014, at the Wayback Machine |
| 141 | September 5 | @ Brewers 7:10 pm | 2-6 | Fiers (5-2) | **Lackey** (13-9) | | 35,103 | 77-64 Archived September 9, 2014, at the Wayback Machine |
| 142 | September 6 | @ Brewers 6:10 pm | 5-3 | **Lynn** (15-8) | Lohse (15-9) | **Rosenthal** (43) | 39,042 | 78-64 Archived September 9, 2014, at the Wayback Machine |
| 143 | September 7 | @ Brewers 1:10 pm | 9-1 | **Wainwright** (17-9) | Nelson (2-7) | | 31,771 | 79-64 Archived September 9, 2014, at the Wayback Machine |
| 144 | September 8 | @ Reds 6:10 pm | 5-0 | **Miller** (9-9) | Parra (0-3) | | 27,612 | 80-64 Archived September 10, 2014, at the Wayback Machine |
| 145 | September 9 | @ Reds 6:10 pm | 5-9 | Leake (11-11) | **Wacha** (5-6) | Chapman (31) | 25,742 | 80-65 Archived September 11, 2014, at the Wayback Machine |
| 146 | September 10 | @ Reds 6:10 pm | 2-4 | Simón (14-10) | **Lyons** (0-4) | Chapman (32) | 26,631 | 80-66 Archived September 11, 2014, at the Wayback Machine |
| 147 | September 11 | @ Reds 11:35 am | 0-1 | Cueto (18-8) | **Lynn** (15-9) | Chapman (33) | 21,688 | 80-67 Archived September 13, 2014, at the Wayback Machine |
| 148 | September 12 | Rockies 7:15 pm | 5-1 | **Wainwright** (18-9) | de la Rosa (13-11) | | 45,108 | 81-67 |
| 149 | September 13 | Rockies 6:15 pm | 5-4 | **Miller** (10-9) | Morales (6-8) | **Neshek** (6) | 45,552 | 82-67 Archived March 3, 2016, at the Wayback Machine |
| 150 | September 14 | Rockies 1:15 pm | 4-1 | **Gonzales** (3-2) | Lyles (6-3) | **Rosenthal** (44) | 44,598 | 83-67 Archived September 15, 2014, at the Wayback Machine |
| 151 | September 16 | Brewers 7:15 pm | 2-3 (12) | Kintzler (3-3) | **Siegrist** (1-4) | Rodríguez (42) | 44,529 | 83-68 Archived March 4, 2016, at the Wayback Machine |
| 152 | September 17 | Brewers 7:15 pm | 2-0 | **Wainwright** (19-9) | Fiers (6-3) | | 44,480 | 84-68 Archived March 4, 2016, at the Wayback Machine |
| 153 | September 18 | Brewers 7:15 pm | 3-2 (13) | **Freeman** (2-0) | Nelson (2-8) | | 44,823 | 85-68 Archived March 4, 2016, at the Wayback Machine |
| 154 | September 19 | Reds 7:15 pm | 2-1 | **Lackey** (14-9) | Holmberg (1-2) | **Maness** (3) | 45,074 | 86-68 |
| 155 | September 20 | Reds 6:15 pm | 8-4 | **Motte** (1-0) | Leake (11-13) | | 46,157 | 87-68 |
| 156 | September 21 | Reds 1:15 pm | 2-7 | Simón (15-10) | **Lynn** (15-10) | | 45,747 | 87-69 |
| 157 | September 22 | @ Cubs 7:05 pm | 8-0 | **Wainwright** (20-9) | Wood (8-13) | | 28,893 | 88-69 Archived March 3, 2016, at the Wayback Machine |
| 158 | September 23 | @ Cubs 7:05 pm | 3-4 (10) | Rosscup (15-10) | **Neshek** (7-2) | | 29,754 | 88-70 Archived March 4, 2016, at the Wayback Machine |
| 159 | September 24 | @ Cubs 7:05 pm | 1-3 | Arrieta (10-5) | **Lackey** (14-10) | Rondon (27) | 33,292 | 88-71 Archived March 4, 2016, at the Wayback Machine |
| 160 | September 26 | @ D'backs 8:40 pm | 7-6 | **Gonzales** (4-2) | Marshall (4-4) | **Rosenthal** (45) | 28,893 | 89-71 Archived April 15, 2015, at the Wayback Machine |
| 161 | September 27 | @ D'backs 7:10 pm | 2-5 | Delgado (4-4) | **Maness** (6-4) | Reed (32) | 39,843 | 89-72 Archived March 3, 2016, at the Wayback Machine |
| 162 | September 28 | @ D'backs 3:10 pm | 1-0 | **Masterson** (7-9) | Collmenter (11-9) | Martínez (1) | 30,617 | 90-72 Archived March 4, 2016, at the Wayback Machine |

== Postseason ==
=== Postseason game log ===
St. Louis Cardinals 2014 Postseason Game Log — Postseason Record: 4–5 (.444) — Home: 3–1 — Road: 1–4
National League Division Series vs. Los Angeles Dodgers

| # | Date | Opponent / Time | Score | Win | Loss | Save | Attendance | Series |
|---|---|---|---|---|---|---|---|---|
| 1 | October 3 | @ Dodgers | 10–9 | Gonzales (1–0) | Kershaw (0–1) | Rosenthal (1) | 54,265 | 1–0 |
| 2 | October 4 | @ Dodgers | 2–3 | League (1–0) | Neshek (0–1) | Jansen (1) | 54,599 | 1–1 |
| 3 | October 6 | Dodgers 8:00 pm | 3–1 | Lackey (1–0) | Elbert (0–1) | Rosenthal (2) | 47,574 | 2–1 |
| 4 | October 7 | Dodgers 4:00 pm | 3–2 | Gonzales (2–0) | Kershaw (0–2) | Rosenthal (3) | 46,906 | 3–1 |

National League Championship Series vs. San Francisco Giants

| # | Date | Opponent / Time | Score | Win | Loss | Save | Attendance | Series |
|---|---|---|---|---|---|---|---|---|
| 1 | October 11 | Giants | 0–3 | Bumgarner (1–0) | Wainwright (0–1) | Casilla (1) | 47,201 | 0–1 |
| 2 | October 12 | Giants | 5–4 | Maness (1–0) | Romo (0–1) | | 46,262 | 1–1 |
| 3 | October 14 | @ Giants | 4–5 (10) | Romo (1–1) | Choate (0–1) | | 42,716 | 1–2 |
| 4 | October 15 | @ Giants | 4–6 | Petit (1–0) | Gonzales (0–1) | Casilla (2) | 43,147 | 1–3 |
| 5 | October 16 | @ Giants | 3–6 | Affeldt (1–0) | Wacha (0–1) | | 43,217 | 1–4 |

== Roster ==
2014 St. Louis Cardinals
Roster
| Pitchers: 65 Keith Butler; 36 Randy Choate; 67 Eric Fornataro; 71 Sam Freeman; 54 Jaime García; 56 Marco Gonzales; 62 Nick Greenwood; 58 Joe Kelly; 41 John Lackey; 31 Lance Lynn; 70 Tyler Lyons; 61 Seth Maness; 44 Carlos Martínez; 63 Justin Masterson; 40 Shelby Miller; 30 Jason Motte; 41,37 Pat Neshek; 68 Jorge Rondón; 26 Trevor Rosenthal; 46 Kevin Siegrist; 64 Samuel Tuivailala; 52 Michael Wacha; 50 Adam Wainwright | Catchers: 48 Tony Cruz; 59 George Kottaras; 4 Yadier Molina; 35,12 A. J. Pierzynski; Infielders: 32 Matt Adams; 13 Matt Carpenter; 33 Daniel Descalso; 3 Mark Ellis; 12,35 Greg Garcia; 38 Pete Kozma; 27 Jhonny Peralta; 59 Xavier Scruggs; 16 Kolten Wong | Outfielders: 8 Peter Bourjos; 65,56 Joey Butler; 21 Allen Craig; 15 Randal Grichuk; 7 Matt Holliday; 19 Jon Jay; 60 Tommy Pham; 43 Shane Robinson; 18 Oscar Taveras; Other batters: 63 Audry Pérez | Manager: 22 Mike Matheny; Coaches: 28 Mike Aldrete (bench); 23 David Bell (assistant hitting); 49 Blaise Ilsley (bullpen); 34 Derek Lilliquist (pitching); 47 John Mabry (hitting); 77 Chris Maloney (first base); 11 José Oquendo (third base); 25 Gaylen Pitts (special assistant); 39 Jamie Pogue (bullpen catcher) |

== Statistics ==
=== Batters ===
(through September 28)

- Statistics notes: POS = Position; G = Games played; AB = At bats; R = Runs; H = Hits; 2B = Doubles; HR = Home runs; RBI = Runs batted in; BB = Base on balls; SO = Strikeouts; HBP = Hit by pitch; GIDP = Grounded into double plays; AVG = Batting average; OBP = On-base percentage; SLG = Slugging percentage; OPS = On-base plus slugging
- Table notes:

* Appeared in most games at that position
Below players (starters) with asterisks (*): Ranked by ABs regardless of position
Excludes pitcher at-bats..

| =Team leader |

| Player | POS | G | AB | R | H | 2B | HR | RBI | BB | SO | HBP | GIDP | Avg. | OBP | SLG | OPS |
|---|---|---|---|---|---|---|---|---|---|---|---|---|---|---|---|---|
| Yadier Molina* | C | 110 | 404 | 40 | 114 | 21 | 7 | 38 | 28 | 55 | 6 | 14 | .282 | .333 | .386 | .719 |
| Matt Adams* | 1B | 142 | 527 | 55 | 152 | 34 | 15 | 68 | 26 | 114 | 3 | 9 | .288 | .321 | .457 | .779 |
| Kolten Wong* | 2B | 113 | 402 | 52 | 100 | 14 | 12 | 42 | 21 | 71 | 4 | 12 | .249 | .292 | .388 | .680 |
| Matt Carpenter* | 3B | 158 | 595 | 99 | 162 | 33 | 8 | 59 | 95 | 111 | 8 | 3 | .272 | .375 | .375 | .750 |
| Jhonny Peralta* | SS | 157 | 560 | 61 | 147 | 38 | 21 | 75 | 58 | 112 | 6 | 19 | .263 | .336 | .443 | .779 |
| Matt Holliday* | LF | 156 | 574 | 83 | 156 | 37 | 20 | 90 | 74 | 100 | 17 | 20 | .272 | .370 | .441 | .811 |
| Jon Jay* | CF | 140 | 413 | 52 | 125 | 16 | 3 | 46 | 28 | 78 | 20 | 17 | .303 | .372 | .378 | .750 |
| Allen Craig* | RF | 97 | 367 | 34 | 87 | 17 | 7 | 44 | 26 | 77 | 3 | 11 | .237 | .291 | .346 | .638 |
| Peter Bourjos | CF | 119 | 264 | 32 | 61 | 9 | 4 | 24 | 20 | 78 | 4 | 5 | .231 | .294 | .348 | .643 |
| Oscar Taveras | RF | 80 | 234 | 18 | 56 | 8 | 3 | 22 | 12 | 37 | 1 | 10 | .239 | .278 | .312 | .590 |
| Mark Ellis | 2B | 73 | 178 | 15 | 32 | 6 | 0 | 12 | 14 | 38 | 4 | 0 | .180 | .253 | .213 | .466 |
| Daniel Descalso | IF | 104 | 161 | 20 | 39 | 11 | 0 | 10 | 20 | 33 | 2 | 2 | .242 | .333 | .311 | .644 |
| Tony Cruz | C | 50 | 135 | 11 | 27 | 5 | 1 | 17 | 13 | 28 | 0 | 6 | .200 | .270 | .259 | .530 |
| Randal Grichuk | RF | 47 | 110 | 11 | 27 | 6 | 3 | 8 | 5 | 31 | 0 | 4 | .245 | .278 | .400 | .678 |
| A. J. Pierzynski | C | 30 | 82 | 6 | 20 | 2 | 1 | 6 | 5 | 14 | 1 | 2 | .244 | .295 | .305 | .600 |
| Shane Robinson | OF | 47 | 60 | 3 | 9 | 1 | 0 | 4 | 6 | 10 | 0 | 3 | .150 | .227 | .200 | .427 |
| Pete Kozma | MI | 14 | 23 | 4 | 7 | 3 | 0 | 0 | 3 | 4 | 0 | 0 | .304 | .385 | .435 | .819 |
| Xavier Scruggs | 1B | 9 | 15 | 0 | 3 | 1 | 0 | 2 | 2 | 7 | 1 | 0 | .200 | .333 | .267 | .600 |
| Greg Garcia | 2B | 14 | 14 | 2 | 2 | 1 | 0 | 1 | 1 | 6 | 3 | 0 | .143 | .333 | .214 | .548 |
| Joey Butler | RF | 6 | 5 | 0 | 0 | 0 | 0 | 0 | 1 | 3 | 0 | 0 | .000 | .167 | .000 | .167 |
| George Kottaras | C | 4 | 5 | 0 | 1 | 0 | 0 | 1 | 1 | 2 | 0 | 0 | .200 | .333 | .200 | .533 |
| Tommy Pham | OF | 6 | 2 | 0 | 0 | 0 | 0 | 0 | 0 | 2 | 0 | 0 | .000 | .000 | .000 | .000 |
| Audry Perez | PH | 1 | 0 | 0 | 0 | 0 | 0 | 0 | 1 | 0 | 0 | 0 | --- | 1.000 | --- | --- |
| Pitcher Totals | — | 162 | 296 | 21 | 44 | 12 | 0 | 16 | 11 | 122 | 3 | 3 | .149 | .187 | .189 | .376 |
| **Team totals** (September 28) | --- | **162** | **5426** | **619** (3.82) | **1371** | **275** | **105** | **585** | **471** | **1133** | **86** | **140** | **.253** | **.320** | **.369** | **.689** |
| NL Rank, (September 28) | --- | --- | **13** | **9** | **8** | **4** | **15** | **10** | **7** | **1** | **1** | **15** | **5** | **5** | **10** | **8** |

St. Louis Cardinals HITTING, MLB

NL Individual HITTING

NL TEAM HITTING

2014 St. Louis Cardinals, Baseball-Reference

=== Starting pitching ===
(through September 28)

- Statistics notes: GS = Games started; IP = Innings pitched; W = Wins; L = Losses; ERA = Earned run average; H = Hits allowed; HR = Home runs allowed; BB = Walks allowed; SO = Strikeouts; WHIP = Walks plus hits per inning pitched; HBP = Hit by pitch; BF = Batters faced; O-AVG = Opponent batting avg.; O-OBP = Opponent on-base avg.; O-SLG = Opponent slugging pct.; R-supt = Run support average from his team's batters per games started
- Includes all starting pitchers.
- Bold: led or tied for team lead

| Pitcher | GS | IP | W | L | ERA | H | HR | BB | SO | WHIP | HBP | BF | O-AVG | O-OBP | O-SLG | R-supt. |
|---|---|---|---|---|---|---|---|---|---|---|---|---|---|---|---|---|
| Adam Wainwright | 32 | **227.0** | **20** | 9 | **2.38** | 184 | 10 | 50 | 179 | **1.03** | **7** | **898** | **.222** | **.271** | **.310** | 4.4 |
| Lance Lynn | **33** | 203.2 | 15 | **10** | 2.74 | **185** | 13 | 72 | **181** | 1.26 | **7** | 866 | .238 | .307 | .355 | 3.6 |
| Shelby Miller | 32 | 183.0 | 10 | 9 | 3.74 | 160 | **22** | **73** | 127 | 1.27 | 2 | 764 | .236 | .310 | .388 | 3.5 |
| Michael Wacha | 19 | 107.0 | 5 | 6 | 3.20 | 95 | 6 | 33 | 94 | 1.20 | 5 | 447 | .234 | .298 | .337 | 3.5 |
| Carlos Martinez | 7 | 89.1 | 2 | 4 | 4.03 | 90 | 4 | 36 | 84 | 1.41 | 4 | 386 | .266 | .343 | .370 | 4.6 |
| John Lackey | 10 | 60.2 | 3 | 3 | 4.30 | 69 | 9 | 15 | 48 | 1.39 | 1 | 261 | .286 | .331 | .461 | 3.6 |
| Jaime García | 7 | 43.2 | 3 | 1 | 4.12 | 39 | 6 | 7 | 39 | 1.05 | 3 | 177 | .234 | .277 | .419 | 4.9 |
| Tyler Lyons | 4 | 36.2 | 0 | 4 | 4.42 | 33 | 4 | 11 | 36 | 1.20 | 2 | 155 | .236 | .299 | .379 | 1.8 |
| Joe Kelly | 7 | 35.0 | 2 | 2 | 4.37 | 41 | 3 | 10 | 25 | 1.46 | 3 | 156 | .291 | .348 | .426 | 3.9 |
| Marco Gonzales | 5 | 34.2 | 4 | 2 | 4.15 | 32 | 5 | 21 | 31 | 1.53 | 1 | 156 | ..241 | .346 | .391 | 6.3 |
| Justin Masterson | 6 | 30.2 | 3 | 3 | 7.04 | 35 | 6 | 13 | 23 | 1.57 | 4 | 140 | .294 | .382 | .496 | 4.1 |

=== Relief pitching ===
Note: W = Wins, L = Losses; ERA = Earned run average; G = Games pitched; GF = Games finished; SV = Saves; IP = Innings pitched; H = Hits allowed; R = Runs allowed; ER = Earned runs allowed; BB = Walks allowed; SO = Strikeouts; HBP = Hit by pitch; BF = Batters faced; WHIP = Walks+hits per inning pitched; OBA = Opponents batting average; OBP = Opponents on-base percentage; SLG = Opponents slugging percentage

- Bold:led or tied for team lead

| Player | W | L | ERA | G | GF | SV | IP | H | R | ER | BB | SO | HBP | BF | WHIP | OBA | OBP | SLG |
|---|---|---|---|---|---|---|---|---|---|---|---|---|---|---|---|---|---|---|
| Seth Maness | 6 | 4 | 2.91 | **73** | 17 | 3 | 80.1 | 77 | 29 | 26 | 11 | 55 | 2 | 317 | 1.10 | .261 | .288 | .380 |
| Trevor Rosenthal | 2 | 6 | 3.20 | 72 | **59** | **45** | 70.1 | 57 | 25 | 25 | 42 | 87 | 4 | 308 | 1.41 | .223 | .387 | .305 |
| Pat Neshek | 7 | 2 | 1.87 | 71 | 17 | 6 | 67.1 | 44 | 14 | 14 | 9 | 68 | 2 | 255 | 0.79 | .183 | .217 | .263 |
| Randy Choate | 2 | 2 | 4.50 | 61 | 6 | 0 | 36.0 | 27 | 18 | 18 | 13 | 32 | 5 | 148 | 1.11 | .213 | .306 | .283 |
| Sam Freeman | 2 | 0 | 2.61 | 44 | 9 | 0 | 38.0 | 34 | 13 | 11 | 19 | 35 | 4 | 169 | 1.40 | .236 | .339 | .299 |
| Kevin Siegrist | 1 | 4 | 6.82 | 37 | 5 | 0 | 30.1 | 32 | 23 | 23 | 16 | 37 | 2 | 140 | 1.58 | .267 | .360 | .458 |
| Jason Motte | 1 | 0 | 4.68 | 29 | 10 | 0 | 25.0 | 29 | 14 | 13 | 9 | 17 | 0 | 110 | 1.52 | .293 | .345 | .545 |
| Nick Greenwood | 2 | 1 | 4.75 | 19 | 8 | 0 | 36.0 | 36 | 19 | 19 | 5 | 17 | 1 | 145 | 1.14 | .259 | .290 | .410 |
| Eric Fornataro | 0 | 0 | 4.66 | 8 | 6 | 0 | 9.2 | 11 | 6 | 5 | 1 | 3 | 1 | 42 | 1.24 | .282 | .310 | .359 |
| Keith Butler | 0 | 0 | 27.00 | 2 | 1 | 0 | 2.0 | 6 | 6 | 6 | 1 | 2 | 0 | 14 | 3.50 | .500 | .571 | .750 |
| Sam Tuivailala | 0 | 0 | 36.00 | 2 | 1 | 0 | 1.0 | 5 | 4 | 4 | 2 | 1 | 0 | 10 | 7.00 | .625 | .700 | 1.375 |
| Jorge Rondón | 0 | 0 | 0.00 | 1 | 0 | 0 | 1.0 | 0 | 0 | 0 | 1 | 0 | 0 | 4 | 1.00 | .000 | .250 | .000 |
| Daniel Descalso | 0 | 0 | 0.00 | 1 | 1 | 0 | 0.1 | 0 | 0 | 0 | 0 | 0 | 0 | 1 | 0.00 | .000 | .000 | .000 |

=== Total team pitching statistics ===
Note: W = Wins; L = Losses; ERA = Earned run average; G = Games pitched; GS = Games started; SV = Saves; IP = Innings pitched; H = Hits allowed; R = Runs allowed; ER = Earned runs allowed; HR = Home runs allowed; BB = Walks allowed; SO = Strikeouts; HBP = Hit by pitch; BF = Batters faced; WHIP = Walks+hits per inning pitched; OBA = Opponents batting average; OBP = Opponents on-base percentage; SLG = Opponents slugging percentage

| W | L | ERA | G | GS | SV | IP | H | R | ER | HR | BB | SO | HBP | BF | WHIP | OBA | OBP | SLG |
| 90 | 72 | 3.50 | 162 | 162 | 55 | 1448.2 | 1321 | 603 | 564 | 123 | 470 | 1221 | 61 | 6069 | 1.24 | .242 | .308 | .366 |

2014 St. Louis Cardinals at Baseball Reference

== Home attendance ==
(through September 21)

| Year | Attendance (games) | AVG/game | Projected | NL Rank | W-L |
|---|---|---|---|---|---|
| 2014 | 3,540,649 (81) | 43,711 | 3,540,649 | 2nd of 15 | 50–31 |
| 2013 | 3,369,769 (81) | 41,602 | 3,369,769 | 2nd of 15 | 54–27 |

2014 St. Louis Cardinals
2014 NL Team Attendance & Miscellaneous
2013 St. Louis Cardinals
2013 NL Team Attendance & Miscellaneous

== Executives and club officials ==
At the end of March, Forbes released their annual valuation list of all Major League franchises and placed the Cardinals eighth. Their estimated value of $820 million was an increase of more than $100 million from the season before, when they ranked tenth. St. Louis' revenue in 2013 was $283 million, with an operating income of $65.2 million.

- Owner, Chairman and CEO: William DeWitt, Jr.
- President: William DeWitt III
- Sr. Vice President & General Counsel: Mike Whittle
- Sr. Vice President of Baseball Operations / GM: John Mozeliak
- Assistant General Manager: Mike Girsch
- Special Assistants to the GM: Ryan Franklin, Mike Jorgensen, Cal Eldred, Red Schoendienst
- Director, Player Personnel: Matt Slater
- Director of Major League Administration: Judy Carpenter-Barada
- Director of Minor League Operations: John Vuch
- Baseball Operations Assistant, Player Development: Tony Ferreira
- Director, Scouting: Dan Kantrovitz
- Director, International Operations: Moisés Rodríguez
- Baseball Operations Assistant, International: Luis Morales
- Manager of Baseball Development: Christopher Correa
- Quantitative Analyst: Matt Bayer, Dane Sorensen
- Director, Media Relations: Brian Bartow
- Director, Public Relations & Civic Affairs: Ron Watermon
- Senior Medical Advisor: Barry Weinberg
- Head League Trainer: Greg Hauck
- Strength/Conditioning Coach: Pete Prinzi
- Equipment Manager: Rip Rowan
- Traveling Secretary: C.J. Cherre
- Vice President & Community Relations & Exec. Director, Cardinals Care: Michael Hall
- Vice President, Event Services and Merchandizing: Vicki Bryant
- Sr. Vice President of Finance/CFO: Brad Wood
- Vice President of Stadium Operations: Joe Abernathy
- Sr. Vice President of Sales & Marketing: Dan Farrell

Cardinals Front Office

== Minor leagues ==
The Cardinals have prospects coming up from the minors that they will have to decide how to place in the 2014 season, and beyond.

=== Affiliations ===
2014 Minor League standings

| Level | Team | League | Location | Manager | W | L | Placing | Refs |
|---|---|---|---|---|---|---|---|---|
| AAA | Memphis Redbirds | Pacific Coast League | Memphis, Tennessee | Ron Warner | – | – | – | |
| AA | Springfield Cardinals | Texas League | Springfield, Missouri | Mike Shildt | – | – | – | |
| Advanced A | Palm Beach Cardinals | Florida State League | Jupiter, Florida | Dann Bilardello | – | – | – | |
| A | Peoria Chiefs | Midwest League | Peoria, Illinois | Joe Kruzel | – | – | – | |
| Short Season A | State College Spikes | New York–Penn League | University Park, Pennsylvania | Oliver Mármol | – | – | – | |
| Rookie | Johnson City Cardinals | Appalachian League | Johnson City, Tennessee | Johnny Rodríguez | – | – | – | |
| Rookie | GCL Cardinals | Gulf Coast League | Jupiter, Florida | Steve Turco | – | – | – | |
| Rookie | DSL Cardinals | Dominican Summer League | Santo Domingo, DR | Fray Peniche | – | – | – | |

LEAGUE CHAMPIONS: State College, Johnson City

=== Organizational and prospect analyses ===
2014 Cardinals Prospect Watch, MLB.com
Memphis Redbirds-AAA roster (Pacific Coast League)
Springfield Cardinals-AA roster (Texas League)
Palm Beach Cardinals--Advanced A roster (Florida State League)

=== Draft selections ===
- St. Louis Cardinals 2014 Draft Selections

The Cardinals' first draft pick for the 2014 draft will be pick #31 of round 1, which is the last pick. The team's place in the order may change – meaning more likely to move up – depending on if free agent Carlos Beltrán signs with another team because the Cardinals advanced him a qualifying offer (QO). As of November 9, Beltrán declined the QO, slotting the Cardinals for the 44th pick in the supplemental first round.

The Cardinals now have in addition to pick #31 in round 1, and the 44th pick in the supplemental first round: second round pick #81, and #84 from the Competitive Balance Lottery. The 2014 Draft takes place from June 5–7.
