= New Britain Bees =

American collegiate summer baseball team

Logo	Cap insignia

Information
- League: FCBL (2020–present)
- Location: New Britain, Connecticut
- Ballpark: New Britain Stadium
- Founded: 2015
- League championships: 2026
- Former league: Atlantic League of Professional Baseball (2015–2019)
- Colors: Black, gold, white
- Mascot: Sting
- Retired numbers: 42
- Ownership: Brad Smith
- General manager: Wendy Smith
- Manager: Matt Gedman
- Website: nbbees.com

The New Britain Bees are an American collegiate summer baseball team based in New Britain, Connecticut. They are a member of the Futures Collegiate Baseball League (FCBL), a wood-bat league with teams in New Hampshire, Massachusetts, Connecticut, and Vermont. Founded in October 2015, the Bees played the 2016 to 2019 seasons as an independent professional baseball team in the Atlantic League of Professional Baseball. The Bees have played all their home games at New Britain Stadium, where they succeeded the New Britain Rock Cats, who played in the Eastern League before moving to Hartford, becoming the Hartford Yard Goats.

The "Bees" name alludes to Beehive Field, an older baseball park which stands next to New Britain Stadium. The civic motto of New Britain suggests, "Industry fills the hive and enjoys the honey." Additionally, the civic emblem and flag incorporate a beehive as a symbol of industriousness. New Britain's official nickname is the "Hardware City," referring to its industrial heritage – namely as the headquarters of Stanley Black & Decker. The former Rock Cats club, both with the "Hardware City" and "New Britain" monikers, also drew its name from manufacturing.

== Logo and colors ==
The New Britain Bees colors are black, gold, and white. The primary logo features the "Bees" wordmark in a Roman font with a metallurgy-inspired serifs. The gold outline surrounding each letter alludes to honey, complete with a stylized beehive.

== History ==
=== Atlantic League ===
In October 2015, it was announced that New Britain would be home to a new Atlantic League team for the upcoming season.

On November 6, 2015, The Bees got their nickname. "Bees" was chosen after a community fan vote with a local newspaper. The other name finalists were "Hammers", "Hard-Hitters", "Stingers" and "Hornets".

On December 8, 2015, The Bees announced Patrick Day as the first general manager in franchise history. Day joined the Bees after previously serving as the general manager of the Southern Maryland Blue Crabs.

On December 16, 2015, Stan Cliburn was named the first manager of the team, he had previously served as manager for the New Britain Rock Cats.

On January 10, 2017, The team announced that Patrick Day would step down as general manager to pursue another job opportunity with the Fresno Grizzlies. Gerry Berthiaume was named as his replacement. Berthiaume had previously been involved with professional baseball in New Britain, as he served as general manager of the New Britain Red Sox and New Britain Rock Cats.

Just a week before the opener of their second season, it was announced that the Bees majority ownership was sold to a group led by Anthony Iacovone. Iacovone is the chief executive officer of the digital advertising technology company AdTheorent. Frank Boulton and his group continue to be connected with the club as minority owners.

On September 27, 2017, The Bees announced yet another new general manager, the third in three seasons, as Gerry Berthiaume announced his retirement from professional baseball after only one season with the Bees. Brad Smith was named the new GM after serving as the Vice President of Business Development for both the Bees and Bridgeport Bluefish. Smith's baseball experience dates to 1995 as a concessions intern with the Chattanooga Lookouts, working his way into a president/GM/ownership role from 2005–2015 with the Kannapolis Intimidators. While with Kannapolis, Smith negotiated the team's stadium lease and naming rights, as well as managed the day-to-day operations of the team and facility. He also has experience as the owner and president of the Wilmington Sharks, a summer collegiate team in the Coastal Plain League from 2014 to 2016.

On November 17, 2017, it was announced that former New York Mets second baseman Wally Backman would become the second Field Manager in franchise history, replacing Stan Cliburn. But that would only last one season. A little over a year after being named Manager of the Bees, Wally would take the open manager position with the Bees' division rival Long Island Ducks, leaving the Bees to find their third field manager in four seasons.

On January 8, 2018, the Bees announced that New Britain native & former MLB pitcher, Mauro Gozzo, would take over as field manager in 2019. Gozzo spent the 2018 season as New Britain's pitching coach under Wally Backman. Before joining the Bees coaching staff in 2018, Gozzo spent some time as a private instructor for players such as MLB pitchers Matt Cain & Drew Pomeranz.

=== Futures Collegiate Baseball League ===
It was reported on October 3, 2019 that the Bees might no longer play in the Atlantic League come the 2020 season. Neither league nor team officials would comment on that, but the team's assistant general manager said, "There will be Bees baseball in New Britain in 2020". On October 28, 2019 the Bees announced that they were joining the Futures Collegiate Baseball League The Bees were able to play a limited number of games during the 2020 season and in January 2021 they announced a five-year extension with the city of New Britain and the Futures Collegiate Baseball League.

On March 9, 2021 the team announced that Brad Smith, whom had been serving as the Bees' general manager since 2018, had purchased the ball club from previous ownership group Frank Boulton, Mike Pfaff, Anthony Iacovone, Tony Amin and Vic Picone. It was also announced that Mike Pfaff will remain with the Bees in an advisory position.

The 2022 season saw the Bees make the playoff for the first time in franchise history and the first time the postseason had been brought to New Britain Stadium since the Double-A Rock Cats in 2009. The Bees would however be swept in a best of three by Nashua.

The 2023 season saw the Bees reach the FCBL postseason for the second straight season. It was also the first time since organized baseball returned to the Hardware City in 1983 that a New Britain team made the postseason in consecutive years. They would also pick up their first playoff win in franchise history but would fall to their in-state rival Norwich in a best of three, two games to one.

The 2026 Bees saw a fifth straight playoff appearance. In the semi final, the #2 seed Bees eliminated #3 seed Norwich, 2-1, while the #1 seed Vermont knocked out the Worcester Bravehearts, 2-1. In the finals, the Bees won the series with Vermont, 2-1. In doing so, the Bees captured the 2026 FCBL title, the first championship in franchise history. They became the first New Britain baseball team to win a title outright, since 1983.

== Roster ==
New Britain Bees roster
Active roster		Coaching staff
Pitchers: -- Fayz Baig; -- Colin Blake; -- Ty Davis; -- Joe Dooley; -- Harrison Engle; -- Victor Frederick; -- Pat McKenzie; -- Evan Mello; -- Adam Merritt; -- Ben Oliveira; -- Alex Oppenheimer; -- Jack Sheldon; -- Tyler Stone; -- Alex Tawa; -- James Tobin; -- Joey Tonnotti; -- Jack Welsch; -- Connor Willett	Catchers: -- Brandon Gaer; -- James Gray; -- Caleb Miller; -- Camden Righi; Infielders: -- Jared Clark; -- Bennett Crear; -- Colin Crowley; -- PJ Hughes; -- Jack Kane; -- Easton Masse; -- Julius Rosado; -- Chaz Wright; Outfielders: -- David Pengel; -- Ryan Perez; -- Nolan Risedorf; -- Charlie Saul	Manager: -- Matt Gedman; Coaches: TBD; Disabled list; ‡ Inactive list; § Suspended list; updated April 30, 2025

== Notable current/former players ==
Former major-leaguers who have played for the Bees include: Josh Thole (2018), Cole Garner (2016), Greg Golson (2016), Eric Fornataro (2016–2017), Nick Greenwood (2016–2017), Josh Outman (2016, 2018), Scott Patterson (2016), Josh Zeid (2016), Joe Beimel (2017), Casey Coleman (2017), Brandon League (2017), Jonathan Pettibone (2017–2018), Sammy Gervacio (2018–2019), Manny Delcarmen (2018), Zach Stewart (2018–2019), Mark Hamburger (2018), Darrell Ceciliani (2018), Reid Brignac (2018), Andy Van Hekken (2018), Alejandro De Aza (2019), Manny Ramirez Jr. (2018), Evan Scribner (2018), Emmet Sheehan (2020), and Ben Casparius (2020).

== Manager History ==
New Britain Bees (Atlantic League)
Season	Manager
2016	Stan Cliburn
2017	Stan Cliburn
2018	Wally Backman
2019	Mauro Gozzo

New Britain Bees (FCBL)
Season	Manager
2020	Ray Guarino
2021	Donnie McKillop
2022	Matt Gedman
2023	Matt Gedman
2024	Matt Gedman
2025	Matt Gedman
2026	Matt Gedman

== Season-by-season records ==
New Britain Bees (Atlantic League)
Season	Total	Finished	Playoffs
2016	71–69	.507	Did not qualify for playoffs
2017	58–81	.417	Did not qualify for playoffs
2018	61–65	.484	Did not qualify for playoffs
2019	72–68	.514	Did not qualify for playoffs
Totals	262–283	.480	Totals

New Britain Bees (Futures Collegiate Baseball League)
Season	Total	Finished	Playoffs
2020	15–23	.395	Did not qualify for playoffs
2021	25–39	.391	Did not qualify for playoffs
2022	37-26	.587	Lost in first round
2023	35-28	.556	Lost in first round
2024	30-25	.545	Lost in first round
2025	29-32	.475	Lost FCBL Championsip
2026	38-20	.655	FCBL Champions
Totals	209–193	.519	Totals
