= Kevin Siegrist =

American baseball player (born 1989)

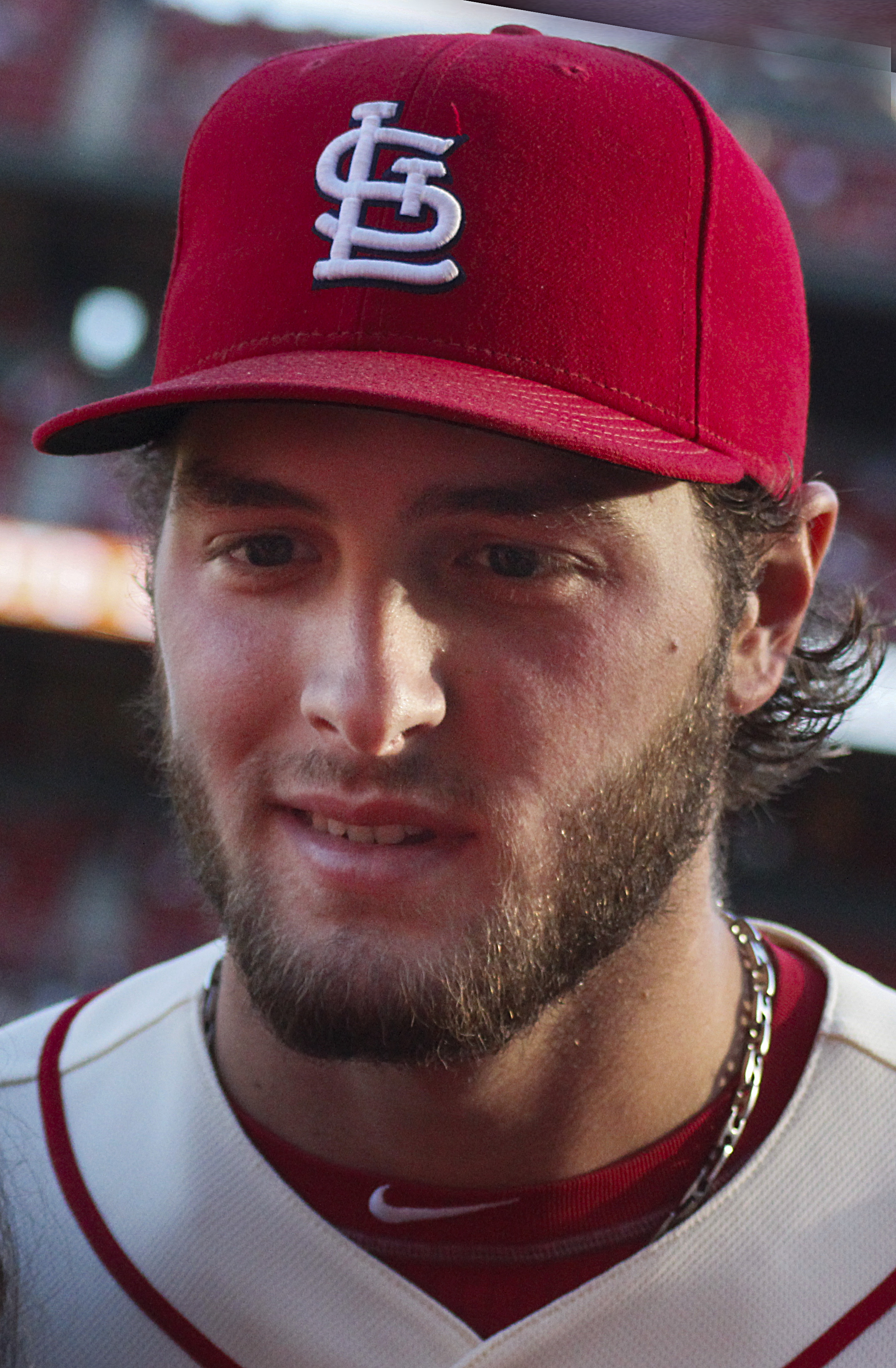
- Siegrist with the St. Louis Cardinals
- Relief pitcher
- Born: July 20, 1989 (age 37); Buffalo, New York, U.S.
- Batted: Left Threw: Left

MLB debut
- June 6, 2013, for the St. Louis Cardinals

Last MLB appearance
- September 23, 2017, for the Philadelphia Phillies

MLB statistics
- Win–loss record: 18–10
- Earned run average: 3.04
- Strikeouts: 286
- Stats at Baseball Reference

Teams
- St. Louis Cardinals (2013–2017); Philadelphia Phillies (2017)

Kevin Ryan Siegrist (born July 20, 1989) is an American former professional baseball pitcher. He has previously played in Major League Baseball (MLB) for the St. Louis Cardinals and Philadelphia Phillies. He was drafted by the Cardinals in 2008 out of Palm Beach State College in Lake Worth, Florida.

After spending a significant amount of time as a starting pitcher, Siegrist converted to relief full-time for 2013. In May, he earned recognition as the Cardinals Pitcher of the Month. He made his MLB debut the next month after spending five years in the minor leagues. For his rookie year, Siegrist posted a 0.45 earned run average (ERA) in 39 2/3 innings pitched (IP), striking out 50.

== Education ==
After graduating from Wellington High School in Wellington, Florida, he attended Palm Beach State College, where he was a walk-on with the "Panthers" baseball team. Siegrist was discovered purely by accident when a scout attending a Palm Beach State game to watch another player took notice of Siegrist's performance.

== Professional career ==
=== St. Louis Cardinals ===
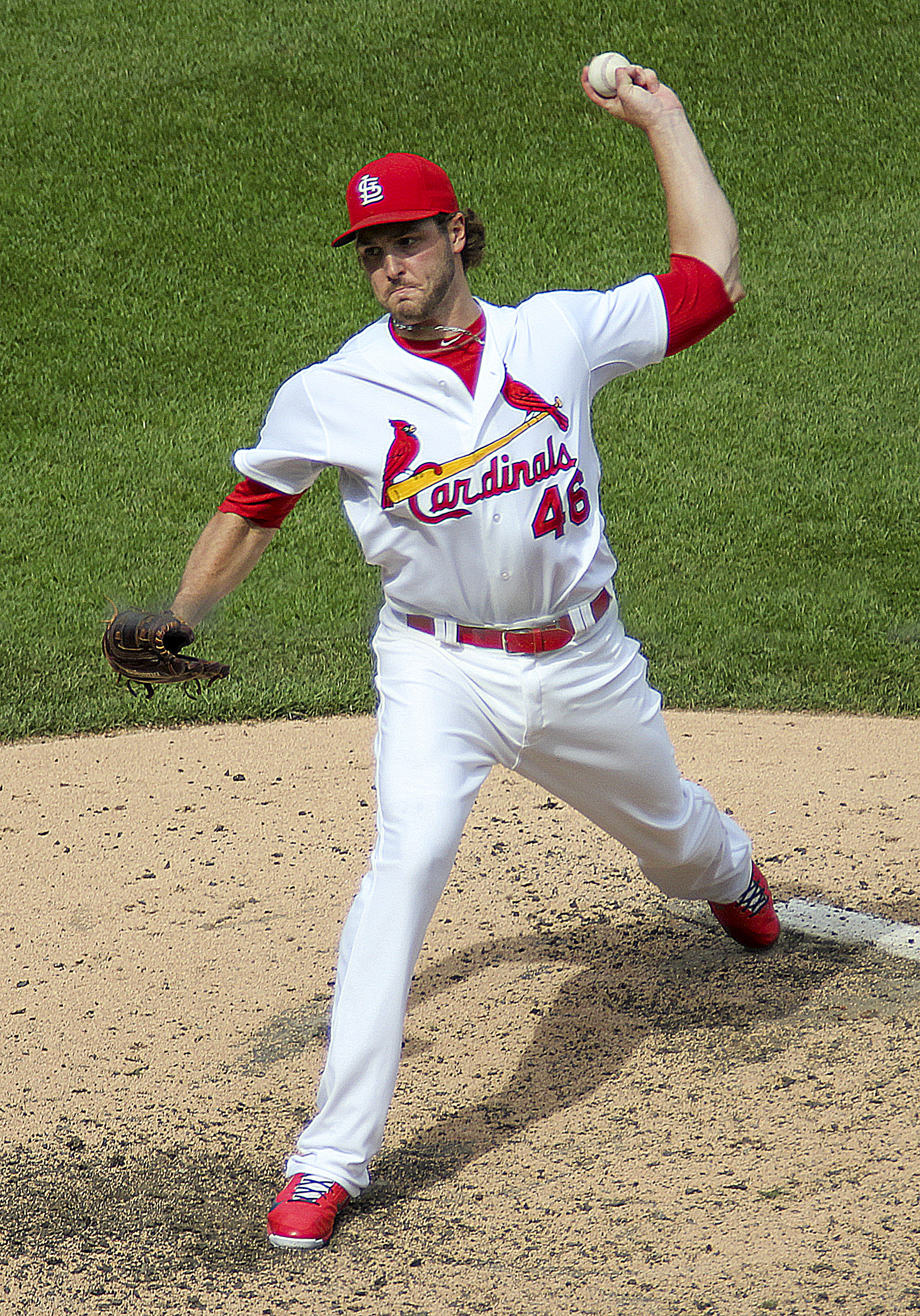
On the hill for St.Louis in 2014.

The Cardinals selected Siegrist in the 41st round of the 2008 MLB draft as the 1,235th player taken out of 1,504 total. He spent the summer playing for the Gulf Coast League Cardinals. In 2009, he pitched for the Batavia Muckdogs, then a Cardinals affiliate in the New York–Penn League. He appeared in ten games for Batavia, making one start and earning a victory while posting an overall season 3.86 ERA. The next season, 2010, was split between Batavia and the Johnson City Cardinals. Siegrist made a combined 14 starts between the two teams, finishing with a season ERA of 4.02 and a 4–4 overall record.

Siegrist again split time among two Cardinals minor league teams in 2011. He began the season in the Class A Midwest League with the Quad Cities River Bandits starting nine games, winning eight of them, and posting a low 1.15 ERA. He was the Topps' Midwest League Player of Month in May. Siegrist fared less well after promotion to the Palm Beach Cardinals back near his Florida home, going 0–3 in eleven games as his ERA jumped to 3.42. However, he did log the most innings pitched, 107, of any point yet in his career. Persistent injuries, consisting of back pain and shoulder soreness, in part, slowed his progress.

Another year, another split season as Siegrist spent 2012 with Palm Beach before advancing to the Double-A Springfield Cardinals. A combined 7–2 record between the two teams, including 6–0 with Palm Beach, and 68 strikeouts over 87 IP caught the attention of officials with main club as the St. Louis Cardinals added Siegrist to their 40-man roster after the 2012 season.

Siegrist started 2013 again with the Springfield Cardinals but the organization began to take a different strategy. Instead of grooming him to be a starter, the Cardinals predicted he would have a velocity increase as a full-time reliever, and as a left-hander, could serve as a valuable late-inning strategic piece. He quickly moved up to the Triple-A Memphis Redbirds of the Pacific Coast League, where he spent just 7 2/3 IP after four years between the Rookie and A levels. Siegrist was named the Cardinals Minor League Pitcher of the Month in May. He posted an ERA of 1.95 and a record of 2–1 in 18 relief appearances combined at Springfield and Memphis. In 27 2/3 IP, he allowed just 11 hits with 10 bases on balls (BB) for a walks plus hits per inning pitched ratio (WHIP) of 0.759. In addition, he registered 44 SO for a ratio of 14.3 strikeouts per 9 innings pitched (K/9).

The Cardinals promoted Siegrist from Memphis to the major leagues on June 6, 2013. He made his major league debut the same night as he took the mound in the 7th inning in relief of Shelby Miller in a game against the Arizona Diamondbacks at Busch Stadium. Siegrist struck out four while allowing one hit in one and two-thirds inning of work. As of his debut, 51 players from the 2008 MLB Draft had been on a major league roster, or 3.4%. Siegrist had also been just one of eight drafted in the 40th round or later that on a major league roster.

Siegrist proved difficult for Major League hitters as allowed a .128 batting average against (BAA); against left-handed hitters it was .118, and .138 against right-handers. For the season, he pitched 39 2/3 innings while allowing a team-low 0.45 ERA for all with at least at many innings pitched as he. With 50 SO, his K/9 ratio was 11.3. In the World Series against the Boston Red Sox, he yielded a home run to David Ortiz, the Series MVP, but did not factor in the decision in that game. The Cardinals lost in six games.

After suffering a forearm injury early in 2014, his BAA increased to .267. He was far less effective, allowing 23 earned runs in 30 1/3 IP − he had allowed just two runs in all of 2013. His ERA was 6.82, and he also allowed 32 hits and 16 walks. In 2015, Siegrist became the primary setup man for closer Trevor Rosenthal. He started off with much dramatically improved results, due in part to restored fastball velocity. He also increased his pitch efficiency, which started at 17.12 in 2013 and increased to 19.2 in 2014. In July 2015, he averaged 16 per inning. He also began varying his pitches more that season, relying much less on the fastball, and more on a changeup and slider.

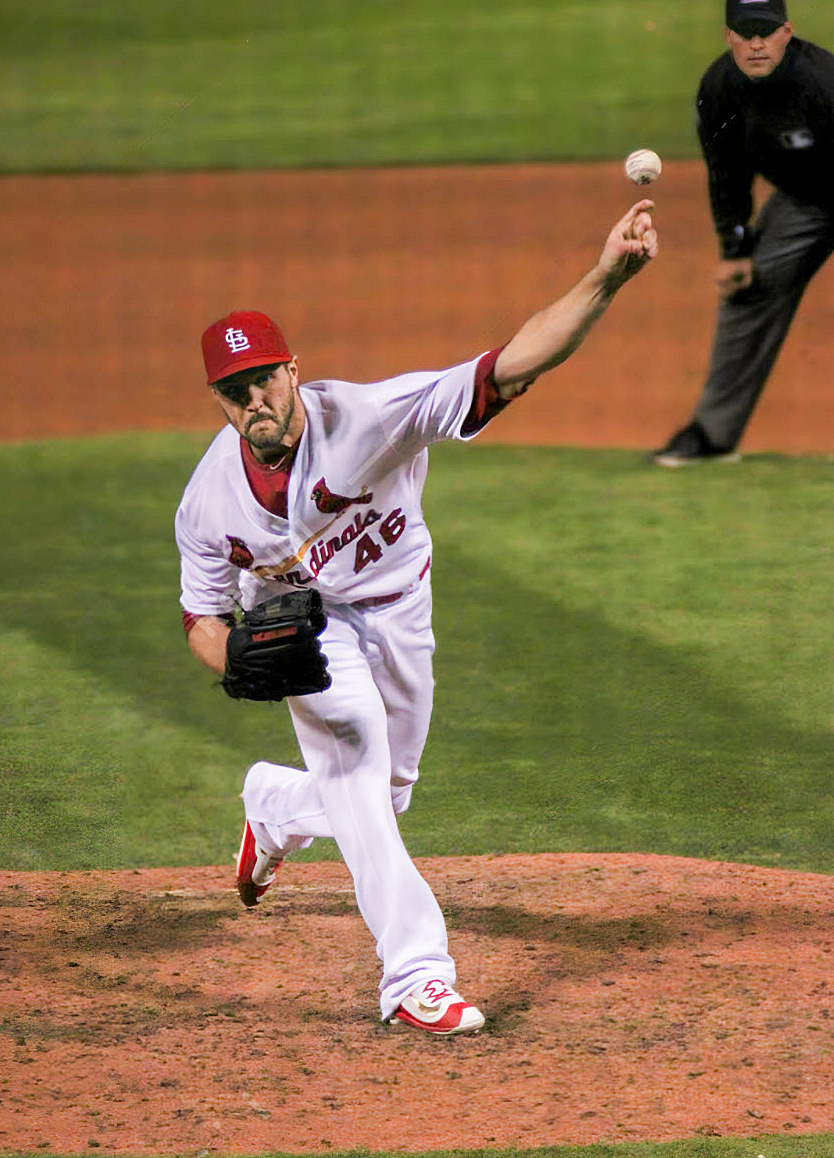
Kevin Siegrist 2016.

Siegrist earned his first major league save by pitching the last two innings of a 6−1 win against the Cincinnati Reds on April 17. In 38 1/3 innings into July, he struck out 49 batters. He had 15 holds, which ranked fourth in the National League (in July), to go with a 1.41 ERA and 1.10 WHIP. He made 80th appearance of the season against the Pittsburgh Pirates on September 30 in an 11–1 win and the club's 100th of season, became just the third left-handed pitcher in franchise history to make that many appearances in a season. He led the major leagues in appearances with 81.

Continuing in the role as a setup reliever in 2016, Siegrist went on the DL on June 30 due to mononucleosis. To that point, he was tied for first in victories among NL relievers at 5−2. Further, in 35 appearances, he posted a 2.78 ERA and one save and 34 strikeouts in 32 1/3 IP. He returned from the DL on July 15. Siegrist suffered through a variety of injuries in 2017. On August 31, 2017, Siegrist was designated for assignment.

=== Philadelphia Phillies ===
The Philadelphia Phillies claimed Siegrist off waivers on September 2, 2017, and he made his Phillies debut on September 4. In 7 appearances for Philadelphia, he posted a 3.60 ERA with 7 strikeouts across 5 innings pitched. On October 4, Siegrist was removed from the 40–man roster and sent outright to the Triple–A Lehigh Valley IronPigs, but he rejected the assignment and elected free agency.

=== Pittsburgh Pirates ===
On February 24, 2018, Siegrist signed a minor league contract with the Pittsburgh Pirates. He was assigned to the Triple–A Indianapolis Indians to begin the season but refused to report and was placed on the restricted list. He was released by the Pirates organization on October 2.

=== Charleston Dirty Birds ===
On July 2, 2022, Siegrist signed with the Charleston Dirty Birds of the Atlantic League of Professional Baseball. In 37 appearances out of the bullpen, he logged a 5–0 record and 1.82 ERA with 53 strikeouts across 39 2/3 innings pitched. Siegrist became a free agent after the season.

== Pitching profile ==
Three primary pitches compose Siegrist's arsenal. He throws a fastball, circle changeup and a slider. According to Brooks Baseball, throws over 90 miles per hour (140 km/h) with his fastball, generating a high number of swings and misses. All three of his pitches result in high numbers of fly balls and his breaking balls are deceptive to hitters. He also mixes in a curveball, but this is rare as he had thrown it just five times through July in the 2015 season.

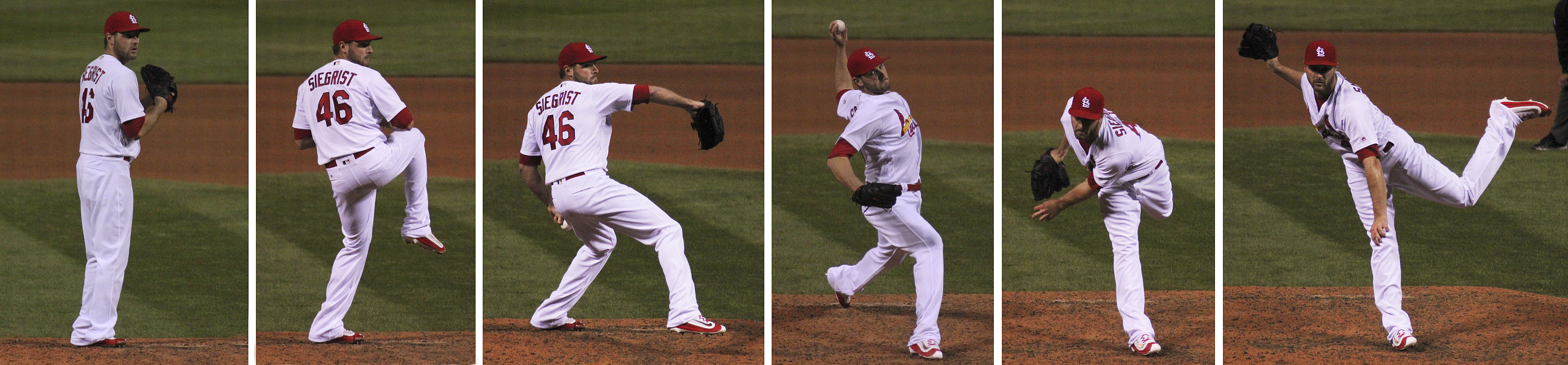
Siegrist's pitching motion, 2016.

== Awards ==
- Topps' Midwest League Player of the Month, May 2011
- Scout.com/Cardinal Nation Top Cardinals Prospect #22, 2013
- Cardinals Player of the Month, May 2013

== See also ==
- St. Louis Cardinals all-time roster
