= Nick Greenwood =

American baseball player (born 1987)

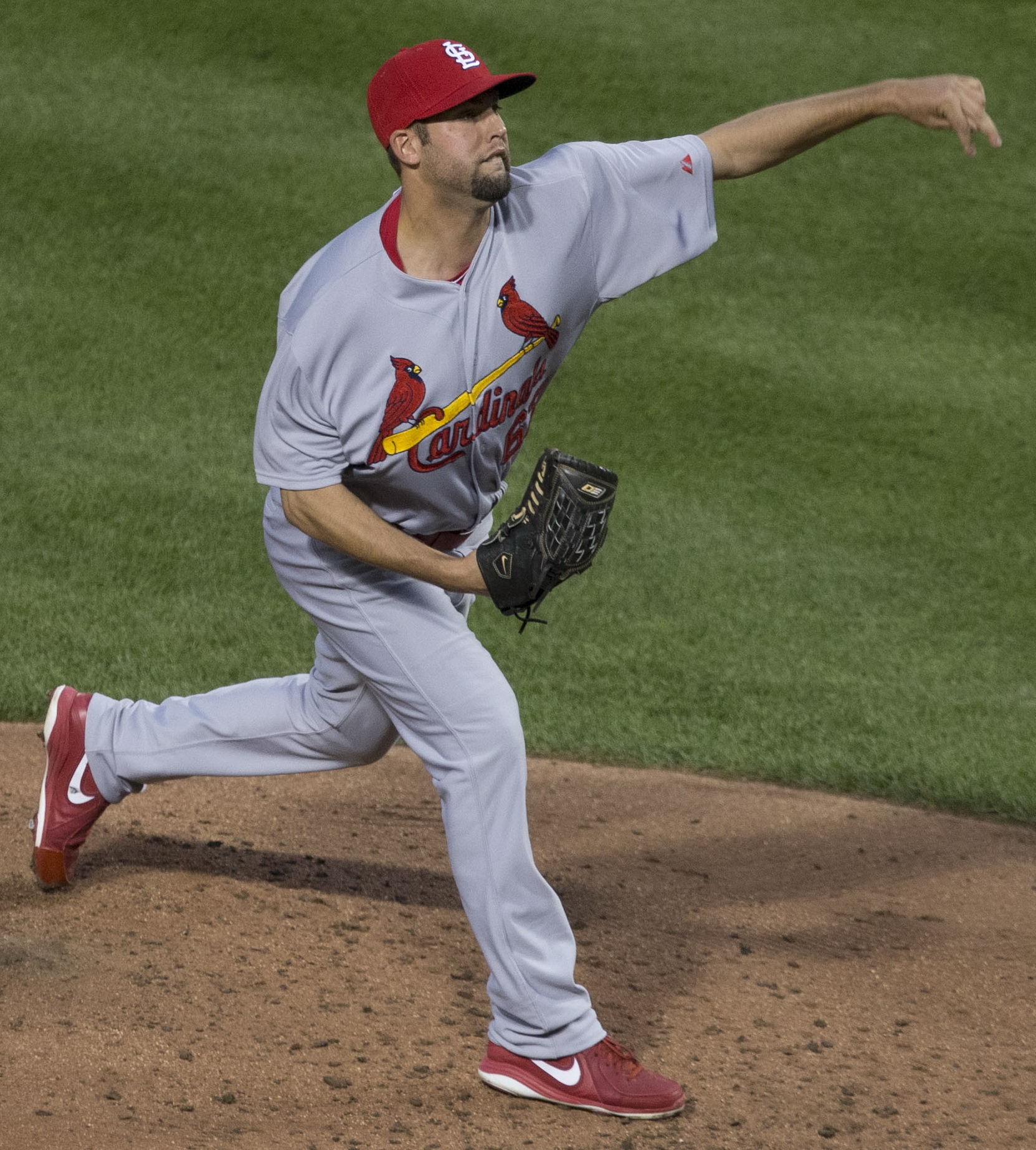
- Greenwood with the St. Louis Cardinals
- Pitcher
- Born: September 28, 1987 (age 38); Farmington, Connecticut, U.S.
- Batted: Right Threw: Left

MLB debut
- June 16, 2014, for the St. Louis Cardinals

Last MLB appearance
- July 11, 2015, for the St. Louis Cardinals

MLB statistics
- Win–loss record: 2–2
- Earned run average: 5.25
- Strikeouts: 17
- Stats at Baseball Reference

Teams
- St. Louis Cardinals (2014–2015)

Nicholas Richard Greenwood (born September 28, 1987) is an American former professional baseball pitcher. He played in Major League Baseball (MLB) for the St. Louis Cardinals.

== Career ==
=== San Diego Padres ===
Greenwood was drafted by the San Diego Padres in the 14th round, with the 414th overall selection, of the 2009 Major League Baseball draft out of the University of Rhode Island, where he played college baseball for the Rhode Island Rams baseball team.

=== St. Louis Cardinals ===
Greenwood was acquired by the St. Louis Cardinals as part of a three-team trade on July 31, 2010, in which the Padres acquired Ryan Ludwick, the Cleveland Indians acquired Corey Kluber, and the Cardinals also added Jake Westbrook.

The Cardinals called Greenwood up to the majors for the first time on June 15, 2014, when his contract was purchased from the Triple-A Memphis Redbirds. He made his major league debut on June 16. Greenwood made 19 appearances (one start) for St. Louis during his rookie campaign, compiling a 2-1 record and 4.75 ERA with 17 strikeouts over 36 innings of work.

Greenwood made one appearance for St. Louis during the 2015 season on July 11, 2015; however, he took the loss after allowing two runs on two hits and failing to record an out. On September 9, Greenwood was designated for assignment by the Cardinals following Matt Adams' activation from the disabled list.

=== Chicago Cubs ===
On January 25, 2016, Greenwood signed a minor league contract with the Chicago Cubs that included an invitation to spring training. He was released prior to the start of the regular season in March.

=== New Britain Bees ===
On April 7, 2016, Greenwood signed with the New Britain Bees of the Atlantic League of Professional Baseball. He made three scoreless appearances for the team, posting a 3-0 record and 17 strikeouts over 19 innings of work.

=== Minnesota Twins ===
On May 6, 2016, Greenwood signed a minor league contract with the Minnesota Twins organization. He made 21 appearances (16 starts) split between the Double–A Chattanooga Lookouts and Triple–A Rochester Red Wings, posting an aggregate 9–4 record and 3.20 ERA with 57 strikeouts across 112 1/3 innings pitched. Greenwood elected free agency following the season on November 7.

On December 30, 2016, Greenwood re-signed with the Twins on a new minor league contract. He was released on June 10, without having made an appearance for the Twins in 2017 due to injury.

=== New Britain Bees ===
On June 20, 2017, Greenwood signed with the New Britain Bees of the Atlantic League of Professional Baseball. He became a free agent after the 2017 season.
