= Tyler Lyons =

American baseball player (born 1988)

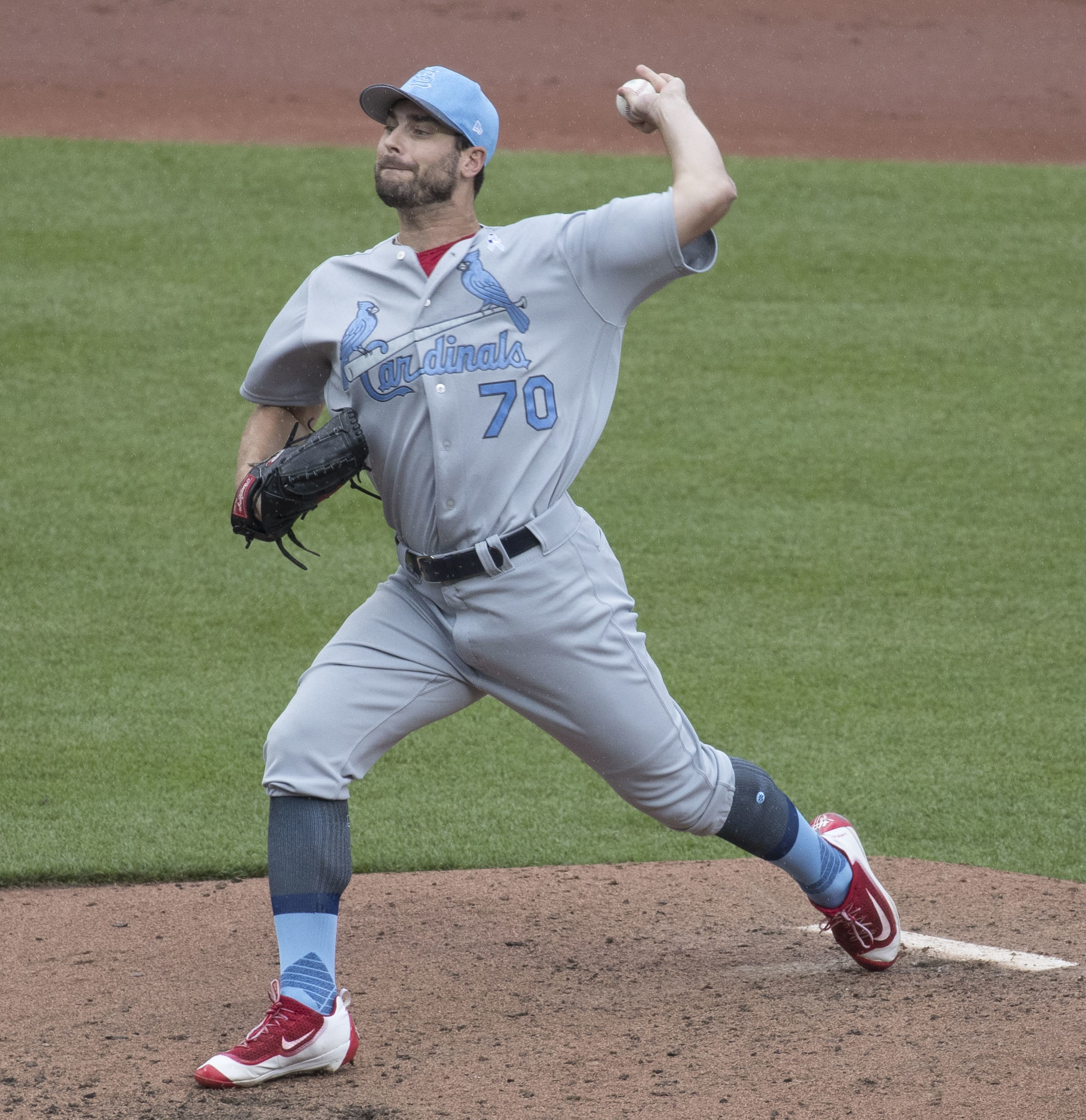
- Lyons with the St. Louis Cardinals
- Pitcher
- Born: February 21, 1988 (age 38); Lubbock, Texas, U.S.
- Batted: Switch Threw: Left

MLB debut
- May 22, 2013, for the St. Louis Cardinals

Last MLB appearance
- September 23, 2020, for the New York Yankees

MLB statistics
- Win–loss record: 13–12
- Earned run average: 4.30
- Strikeouts: 289
- Stats at Baseball Reference

Teams
- St. Louis Cardinals (2013–2018); Pittsburgh Pirates (2019); New York Yankees (2019–2020)

Tyler William Lyons (born February 21, 1988) is an American former professional baseball pitcher. He attended Oklahoma State University (OSU) at Stillwater and played college baseball for the Cowboys. The New York Yankees selected him in the 10th round of the 2009 amateur draft, but he chose to remain at OSU. The next year, the St. Louis Cardinals made him a ninth round pick, and he signed. Along with the Yankees, he has played in MLB for the St. Louis Cardinals and Pittsburgh Pirates.

In 2011, while pitching for the Palm Beach Cardinals of the Florida State League in the minor leagues, Lyons pitched the first no-hitter in team history. He is a three-time recipient of the Pacific Coast League Pitcher of the Week Award.

== High school and college ==
Born in Lubbock, Texas, Lyons attended Frenship High School where he was a multi-sport athlete. He lettered in football for three years. On the baseball field, Lyons was a two-time district MVP and was named All-City Player of the Year his senior season by the Lubbock Avalanche-Journal.

Lyons attended Oklahoma State University where he majored in sport management and played baseball for the Cowboys from 2007 to 2010. In 2008 he posted 12 wins, fourth-best nationally, while earning second-team All-Big 12 honors. He was strong in the classroom as well, being named first-team Academic All-Big 12. In the summer of 2008, Lyons was chosen to play for Team USA. His 11 appearances without giving up an earned run helped the team to a 24-0 record and a gold medal in the FISU World Championships. In 2009 Lyons tied for the team lead with seven wins, while earning an All-Big 12 honorable mention. He played collegiate summer baseball in 2009 for the Chatham Anglers of the Cape Cod Baseball League.

== Professional career ==
=== Minor Leagues ===
The New York Yankees drafted Lyons in the 10th round of the 2009 amateur draft, but he chose to return to OSU. The Cardinals selected him in the ninth round in 2010, and he signed.

Lyons signed too late to play in the Cardinals minor league system in 2010; however, in 2011 he pitched for the Palm Beach Cardinals of the Florida State League. On August 8, 2011, he threw the first no-hitter in Palm Beach's history, a 10–0 win over the Fort Myers Miracle. Lyons struck out eight and faced two batters over the minimum in his eighth career professional start. He finished the 2011 season with an overall record of 9-4 with an ERA of 4.50 over 94 innings pitched.

Lyons split the 2012 season between the Cardinals Double-A affiliate Springfield Cardinals of the Texas League and Triple-A Memphis Redbirds of the Pacific Coast League (PCL). In 12 starts for Springfield, he was 5-4 with a 3.92 ERA. Lyons struggled to adjust, however, after moving up to Memphis, going just 4-9 with a 4.28 ERA over 88 innings (15 starts) for the Redbirds.

=== St. Louis Cardinals ===
==== 2013 ====
Lyons started the 2013 season with Memphis, posting a record of 2–1 in eight starts with a 4.47 ERA prior to his first major league call-up. He made his major league debut with the Cardinals on May 22, 2013, against the San Diego Padres at Petco Park, allowing one run and four hits over seven innings as the Cardinals won, 5–3. After winning his first two games, Lyons began to struggle on the mound. On June 22 the Cardinals optioned Lyons to Triple A Memphis and called up Michael Blazek. In his previous four starts, Lyons gave up at least four earned runs in each start and saw his ERA climb to 5.51; his ultimate appearance lasted just 1 2/3 innings on June 21 against the Texas Rangers.

Lyons made six more appearances – two starts – in the rest of 2013, and finished the year 2–4 with a 4.75 ERA in 12 games. The Cardinals appeared in the World Series, but left Lyons off the playoff roster.

==== 2014 ====
Beginning the 2014 season again in Memphis, Lyons made three starts before the Cardinals recalled him on April 21 to replace the injured Joe Kelly in the rotation. He made four starts with two relief appearances sandwiched between as the temporary fifth starter, going 0–3 with a 6.12 ERA and 23 strikeouts in 25 innings. Following a May 12 start in which he gave up 9 runs in 4 innings pitched, he was placed on the disabled list with a shoulder strain, and replaced in the rotation by Jaime García. Lyons pitched most of the rest of the season in Memphis, where he had a six-game streak of winning his starts. In St. Louis in 2014, Lyons went 0-4 in 11 appearances (four starts), posting a 4.42 ERA with 36 strikeouts and a 1.200 WHIP.

==== 2015 ====
Filling roles as a sixth starter and swingman in 2015, the Cardinals recalled Lyons from Memphis to replace injured starters, including Adam Wainwright and Lance Lynn. After a brief stint in April, the club optioned Lyons back to Memphis. For the week ending June 7, he named PCL Pitcher of the week after defeating both the Salt Lake Bees and Iowa Cubs. Combined, he allowed a 0.00 ERA, 0.54 WHIP and .136 batting average against while striking out 13 in 13 IP. The Cardinals then recalled him to replace Lynn. Lyons made his next MLB start on June 13, stopping a winless streak of 13 MLB starts by pitching a 3–2 victory over the Kansas City Royals. He struck out five in six innings. Lyons' next start, against the Philadelphia Phillies on June 19, was his second win of the season by a 12–4 margin. While hitting, he collected his first major league run batted in and base on balls and hit two singles. He reached base and scored in all three plate appearances.

In his first relief appearance of the season, Lyons completed 5 1/3 scoreless innings in a 10–5 loss to the Pittsburgh Pirates on August 13. It was the Cardinals' first scoreless relief outing of at least five innings since Manny Aybar did so in 1999. Starting against the Pittsburgh Pirates on September 30, Lyons completed seven scoreless innings with just four hits and no walks allowed while the Cardinals won their 100th game of the season by an 11–1 score and clinched their third consecutive National League Central division title. Reaching new major league career highs in multiple categories, Lyons appeared in 17 games and 60 innings for the Cardinals, with eight starts, 3.75 ERA, 3–1 W–L record, 60 strikeouts, and 12 home runs allowed.

==== 2016 ====
In 2016, Lyons made 30 appearances out of the bullpen and finished the year 2-0 with a 3.38 ERA. On November 10, 2016, Lyons underwent right knee surgery, which required 5–6 months to recover. The procedure was performed by Dr. George Paletta, a former team physician of the Cardinals.

==== 2017 ====
In 2017, Lyons began the season on the disabled list but returned in late May. Upon his return to St. Louis, he worked strictly out of the bullpen. He was 4-1 and posted career best marks in ERA (2.83), WHIP (1.09), and K/9 innings (11.3) in 54 relief innings pitched.

==== 2018 ====
After compiling an 8.64 ERA in 27 relief appearances, Lyons was designated for assignment on July 27, 2018. He cleared waivers and was outrighted to the Triple-A Memphis Redbirds, where he spent the remainder of the year. He declared free agency on October 2, 2018.

=== Pittsburgh Pirates ===
On January 1, 2019, Lyons signed a minor league deal with the Pittsburgh Pirates. He opened the 2019 season with the Indianapolis Indians. His contract was selected on May 4. On May 8, he was designated for assignment. He was released on August 11.

=== New York Yankees ===
On August 15, 2019, Lyons signed a minor league deal with the New York Yankees. On September 1, the Yankees selected Lyons' contract. Lyons was outrighted off the Yankees roster on November 4, and elected free agency. On February 3, 2020, Lyons signed a new minor league contract with the Yankees. On September 22, 2020, Lyons was selected to the 40-man and active rosters. Lyons was outrighted off of the roster on September 25. On January 6, 2021, Lyons re-signed with the Yankees on a minor league contract.

== Awards and accomplishments ==
- 3× Pacific Coast League Pitcher of the Week (July 7, 2013; August 3, 2014; June 7, 2015)
- 1st no-hitter in Palm Beach Cardinals history: 10–0 win over Fort Myers Miracle (August 8, 2011)

== Personal life ==
Lyons proposed to longtime girlfriend Jennifer Sutton in November 2015 and they were married on December 3, 2016, in Anna, Texas. The couple's first child, a daughter, was born in December 2017.
