= Eric Fornataro =

American baseball pitcher (born 1988)

- Pitcher
- Born: January 2, 1988 (age 38); Houston, Texas, U.S.
- Batted: Right Threw: Right

MLB debut
- April 21, 2014, for the St. Louis Cardinals

Last MLB appearance
- June 28, 2014, for the St. Louis Cardinals

MLB statistics
- Win–loss record: 0–0
- Earned run average: 4.66
- Strikeouts: 3
- Stats at Baseball Reference

Teams
- St. Louis Cardinals (2014)

Eric Anthony Fornataro (born January 2, 1988) is an American former professional baseball pitcher. He played in Major League Baseball (MLB) for the St. Louis Cardinals.

== Career ==
=== St. Louis Cardinals ===
The St. Louis Cardinals selected Fornataro in the sixth round, with the 185th overall selection, in the 2008 Major League Baseball draft from Miami-Dade Community College. He split his first professional season between the rookie-level Gulf Coast League Cardinals and Johnson City Cardinals. Fornataro split the 2009 campaign between the Low-A Batavia Muckdogs and Single-A Quad Cities River Bandits, accumulating a 4-5 record and 3.63 ERA with 25 strikeouts over 15 appearances (11 starts).

Fornataro returned to Quad Cities in 2010, compiling a 7-15 record and 5.26 ERA with 100 strikeouts across 28 starts. In 2011, he made 24 starts for the High-A Palm Beach Cardinals, posting a 7-13 record and 3.67 ERA with 116 strikeouts across 144 2/3 innings pitched. Fornataro made 57 appearances out of the bullpen for the Double-A Springfield Cardinals during the 2012 season, registering a 3-3 record and 2.39 ERA with 41 strikeouts and five saves.

On November 20, 2012, the Cardinals added Fornataro to their 40-man roster to protect him from the Rule 5 draft. He spent the 2013 season with the Triple-A Memphis Redbirds, accumulating a 1-4 record and 6.02 ERA with 39 strikeouts in 55 1/3 innings pitched across 37 appearances (four starts).

Fornataro made his major league debut on April 21, 2014, against the New York Mets. Fornataro made eight appearances for the Cardinals during his rookie campaign, recording a 4.66 ERA with three strikeouts across 9 2/3 innings pitched.

=== Washington Nationals ===
Fornataro was claimed off waivers by the Washington Nationals on November 3, 2014. On February 2, 2015, Fornataro was designated for assignment by the Nationals following the signing of Casey Janssen.

=== Baltimore Orioles ===
On April 7, 2016, Fornataro signed with the New Britain Bees of the Atlantic League of Professional Baseball. However, the next day, Fornataro signed a minor league contract with the Baltimore Orioles. He made 10 appearances for the Double-A Bowie Baysox, posting a 2-1 record and 8.10 ERA with 10 strikeouts over 10 innings of work. Fornataro was released by the Orioles organization on May 26.

=== New Britain Bees ===
Following his release from the Orioles organization, Fornataro signed with the New Britain Bees of the Atlantic League of Professional Baseball. He made 35 relief appearances for New Britain, compiling a 1-5 record and 4.50 ERA with 24 strikeouts across 46 innings pitched.

On March 28, 2017, Fornataro re-signed with the Bees. In 15 appearances (nine starts) for the team, he logged an 0-2 record and 5.85 ERA with 19 strikeouts over 40 innings of work.

=== Southern Maryland Blue Crabs ===
On July 24, 2017, Fornataro was traded to the Southern Maryland Blue Crabs of the Atlantic League of Professional Baseball. In nine starts for Southern Maryland, he struggled to an 0-7 record and 6.39 ERA with 24 strikeouts over 38 innings of work. On November 1, Fornataro became a free agent.
