= Santiago Casilla =

Dominican baseball player (born 1980)

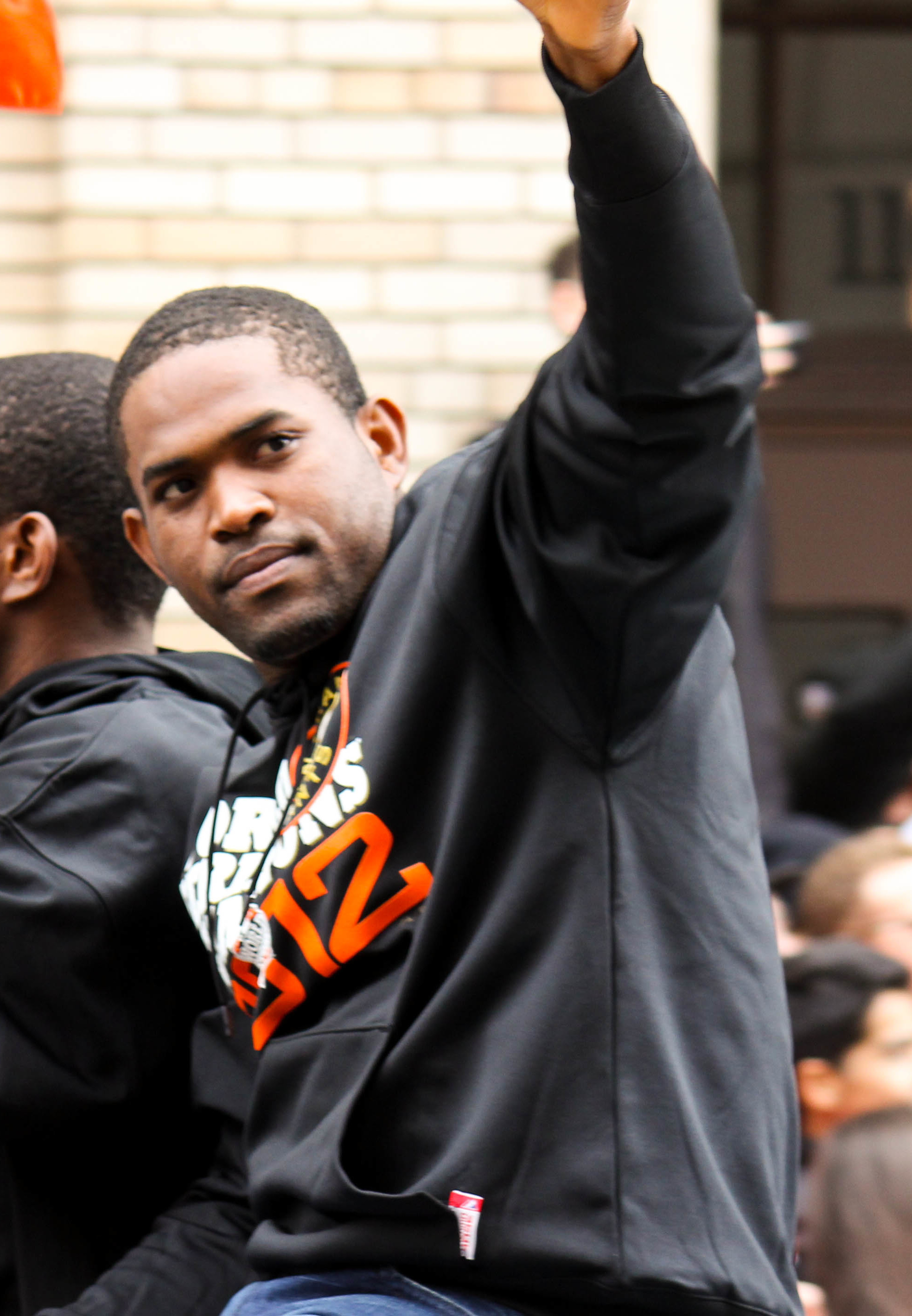
- Casilla at the 2012 World Series victory parade
- Pitcher
- Born: July 25, 1980 (age 46); San Cristóbal, Dominican Republic
- Batted: Right Threw: Right

MLB debut
- August 9, 2004, for the Oakland Athletics

Last MLB appearance
- July 13, 2018, for the Oakland Athletics

MLB statistics
- Win–loss record: 42–31
- Earned run average: 3.29
- Strikeouts: 583
- Saves: 144
- Stats at Baseball Reference

Teams
- Oakland Athletics (2004–2009); San Francisco Giants (2010–2016); Oakland Athletics (2017–2018)

Career highlights and awards
- 3× World Series champion (2010, 2012, 2014); San Francisco Giants Wall of Fame
Medals
Men's baseball
Representing Dominican Republic
World Baseball Classic
Gold medal – first place	2013 San Francisco	Team

Santiago Casilla (born July 25, 1980) is a Dominican former professional baseball relief pitcher. He played in Major League Baseball (MLB) from 2004 to 2018 for the Oakland Athletics and San Francisco Giants. Casilla threw four pitches: a fastball, slider, curveball, and changeup.

Casilla originally signed with Oakland under the name of Jairo Garcia, listing his birthdate as 1983. He debuted with Oakland in 2004, pitching briefly for them that year and the next. In January 2006, he revealed his true name and age. 2007 marked the first time he pitched more than four games in a year for Oakland; he an initial boost to their bullpen but missed the latter part of the season with an injury. He appeared in 51 games in 2008, then was allowed to become a free agent after posting a 5.96 earned run average (ERA) in 2009.

The Giants signed Casilla in 2010; after starting the season in the minor leagues, he was called up in May and remained with the team for the rest of the season. Casilla won the World Series with the Giants that fall; he also won World Series championships in 2012 and 2014, one of only eight players with the team for all three championships. He replaced Brian Wilson as the closer for the Giants in late 2011 and again at the beginning of 2012, when Wilson was injured. Sergio Romo replaced him as the closer halfway through 2012, but Casilla reclaimed the role in 2014, holding it until the end of 2016. Three times with the Giants, he posted an ERA under 2.00.

After Casilla struggled in 2016, he became a free agent. The Athletics signed him in 2017, and he closed for them until they acquired Blake Treinen in August. He pitched the first half of 2018 with them, then finished the year in the minor leagues for the Colorado Rockies.

== Early life ==
Santiago Casilla was born on July 25, 1980, in San Cristóbal, Dominican Republic. He attended high school in Sabana Grande de Palenque. Casilla wanted to be a baseball player, but he was still unsigned at the age of 19, and most Major League Baseball (MLB) scouts in the Dominican Republic were more interested in signing younger prospects. Obtaining false papers from a friend, Casilla began pitching under the name of Jairo Garcia, listing his birthday as March 7, 1983. On January 31, 2000, he was signed as an amateur free agent by the Oakland Athletics.

== Professional career ==
=== Minor leagues ===
Casilla made his professional debut with the rookie league Dominican Summer League Athletics in 2000. Appearing in 11 games, 10 of which he started, he had a 6–2 record and a 3.26 earned run average (ERA). In 2001, he pitched in 12 games (7 starts) for the rookie league Arizona League Athletics, posting a 4–2 record, a 2.85 ERA, 50 strikeouts, 7 walks, and 37 hits allowed in 47 1/3 innings pitched.

When the 2002 season began, Casilla remained with the Arizona League Athletics. In 13 games (8 starts), he had a 2–1 record, a 2.44 ERA, 66 strikeouts, 17 walks, and 56 hits allowed in 59 innings pitched before getting promoted to the Vancouver Canadians of the Single-A short season Northwest League on August 24. He finished the year with three starts for the Canadians, losing all of them and posting a 7.30 ERA.

Casilla participated in extended spring training in 2003, delaying the start of his minor league season until May 19, when he was assigned to the Kane County Cougars of the Single-A Midwest League. He pulled his left hamstring in July and was on the disabled list from the 12th to the 29th. In 14 games (9 starts), he had an 0–1 record, a 2.55 ERA, 28 strikeouts, 19 walks, and 40 hits allowed in 42 1/3 innings pitched.

=== Oakland Athletics, first stint (2004–2009) ===
==== 2004 ====
In 2004, Casilla became a full-time relief pitcher. Starting the season with Kane County, he was used as the Cougar closer, recording 16 saves while posting a 1–0 record, an 0.30 ERA, 49 strikeouts, 6 walks, and 16 hits allowed in 25 games (30 innings pitched). On June 24, he was called up by the Double-A Midland RockHounds of the Texas League. In 13 games, he had a 2–0 record, two saves, a 1.50 ERA, 32 strikeouts, 15 walks, and 10 hits allowed in 18 innings pitched. On July 30, he was promoted to the Sacramento River Cats of the Triple-A Pacific Coast League (PCL); he made three appearances for them before getting called up to Oakland for the first time on August 9.

Casilla made his Major League Baseball (MLB) debut that same day, holding the Minnesota Twins scoreless for the final 2 innings of an 8–2 victory. He appeared in two more games before being sent back to Sacramento on August 18. In 11 games for Sacramento, he had a 1–2 record, 1 save, a 3.95 ERA, 21 strikeouts, nine walks, and 10 hits in 13 2/3 innings. The Athletics called him back up in September, but he only appeared in one more game. In his four outings for Oakland, he had no record, no saves, a 12.71 ERA, five strikeouts, nine walks, and five hits allowed in 5 2/3 innings.

==== 2005 ====
Casilla started the 2005 season with Midland. Serving as their closer, he recorded six saves in 10 games, with a 1.08 ERA, 30 strikeouts, nine walks, and nine hits allowed in 16 2/3 innings. On May 10, he was promoted to the River Cats, where he also served as the closer. The Athletics called him up on June 17, and he faced the Philadelphia Phillies that evening in his lone appearance before getting returned to Sacramento four days later. In 44 games with Sacramento, he had a 3–6 record, 20 saves, a 4.47 ERA, 73 strikeouts, 20 walks, and 45 hits allowed in 48 1/3 innings pitched. Promoted to Oakland again in September, he pitched in two more games before the end of the year. In his three total appearances for Oakland, he had a 3.00 ERA, 1 strikeout, 1 walk, and 2 hits allowed in 3 innings pitched.

==== 2006 ====
In January 2006, during the MLB offseason, Casilla's agent had him tell the Athletics his real name and age. "It certainly changes what you ultimately think his upside would be," said Athletics assistant general manager (GM) David Forst, though Forst also observed that the ability to throw 94 miles per hour (151 km/h) kept Casilla a viable MLB prospect. Due to U.S. security concerns over the name change, Casilla was a month late reporting to spring training and was instantly assigned to work with the minor leaguers. Called up from Sacramento on May 21, he appeared in two games, posting an 11.57 ERA before getting returned to Sacramento on May 27. His season ended on June 21 because of a right shoulder strain. In 25 games for Sacramento, he had a 2–0 record, 4 saves in 8 opportunities, a 3.27 ERA, 32 strikeouts, 10 walks, and 25 hits allowed in 33 innings.

==== 2007 ====
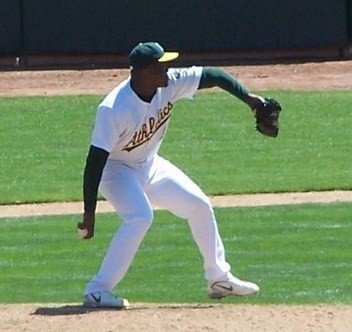
Casilla with the Athletics in 2007

In 2007, Casilla was recalled by the Athletics on June 3 after going 2–1 with a 4.13 ERA and 29 strikeouts in 24 innings for Sacramento. He stepped into a depleted bullpen that had lost Huston Street, Justin Duchscherer, and Kiko Calero to the disabled list. Casilla started off well, going 2–1 with two saves and an 0.43 ERA in his first 17 games. He picked up his first MLB save on June 6, retiring Manny Ramirez on a fly ball to end the eighth inning and pitching a scoreless ninth in a 3–2 win over the Boston Red Sox. On June 19, he entered a game against the Cincinnati Reds with the bases loaded and struck out Brandon Phillips to keep a run from scoring. He then struck out three batters in a scoreless top of the ninth inning, pumping his fist as he walked off the mound, though the Athletics failed to rally in the bottom of the inning and lost 5–2. Starting on July 15, however, he had a 7.28 ERA in 29 games over the remainder of the season. Umpire John Hirschbeck ejected Casilla from a game against the Tampa Bay Devil Rays on August 23 for throwing a pitch at Brendan Harris. In 46 games for Oakland, he had a 3–1 record, two saves, a 4.44 ERA, 52 strikeouts, 23 walks, and 43 hits allowed in 53 2/3 innings pitched.

==== 2008 ====
Casilla opened the season on a major league roster for the first time in 2008. He pitched well in his first 21 games, posting an 0.93 ERA and limiting hitters to a .185 batting average against. Then, he was on the disabled list from May 16 through June 19 with right elbow soreness. In 30 games after returning, he recorded a 5.81 ERA, and opponents batted .353 against him. He appeared in a total of 51 games, posting a 2–1 record, two saves, a 3.93 ERA, 43 strikeouts, 20 walks, and 60 hits allowed in 50 1/3 innings. Over the offseason, he made nine appearances for the Leones del Escogido of the Dominican Winter League, allowing no earned runs and collecting 4 saves.

==== 2009 ====
A member of Oakland's Opening Day roster again in 2009, Casilla posted a 1.59 ERA and .079 opponent batting average in his first 9 games. Then, he was on the disabled list with a sprained right knee from May 2 through May 15. His ERA was 7.30 thereafter, and the Athletics only used him eight times in the season's final 58 days. In 46 games, he had a 1–2 record, 0 saves, a 5.96 ERA, 35 strikeouts, 25 walks, and 61 hits allowed in 48 1/3 innings. After the season, the Athletics chose not to offer him a contract, making him a free agent on December 10. He again pitched for the Leones in the offseason, this time making 15 appearances. Casilla posted a 1–1 record and a 2.51 ERA, recording three saves.

=== San Francisco Giants (2010–2016) ===
==== 2010 ====
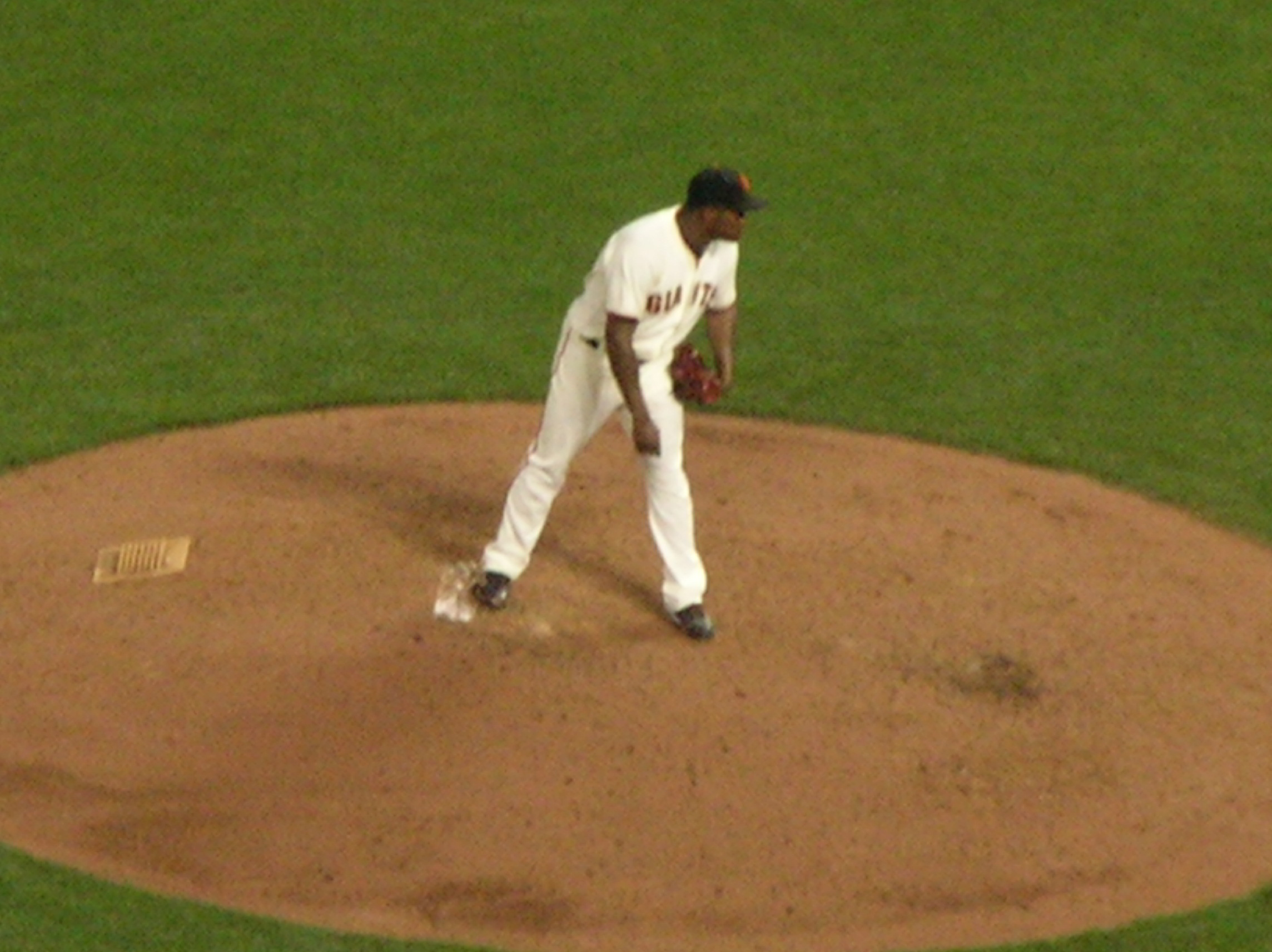
Casilla as he pitched three innings against the Cubs on August 10, 2010

Casilla signed a minor league contract with the San Francisco Giants on January 2, 2010. Visa problems delayed his return to the United States for a month, and he began the season with the PCL's Fresno Grizzlies. In four games for Fresno, he allowed no runs and recorded two saves. On May 21, he was recalled by the Giants when Brandon Medders was placed on the disabled list. He made his Giants debut on May 21 against his former team in Oakland, striking out the only batter he faced (Daric Barton) in a 6–1 defeat. On June 6, after Giants closer Brian Wilson had blown a save against the Pittsburgh Pirates but San Francisco had retaken the lead in the 10th inning, Casilla relieved Wilson with one out and runners on first and second, retiring both batters he faced to earn his first National League (NL) save. After he allowed three runs and blew a lead against the Arizona Diamondbacks on July 23, though the Giants still won the game 7–4, his ERA rose from 2.25 to 3.48. However, in his final 28 games of the season, Casilla's ERA was 1.04. On August 10, he set a career high with three innings pitched, allowing no runs, though the Giants lost 8–6 to the Chicago Cubs. In 52 games, he had a 7–2 record, two saves, a 1.95 ERA, 56 strikeouts, 26 walks, and 50 hits allowed in 55 1/3 innings pitched. On Casilla's success with the Giants, sportswriter Carl Steward observed that the Giants' signing of him "turned out to be the biggest theft [Giants GM] Brian Sabean ever made against his cross-bay counterpart Billy Beane".

The Giants reached the playoffs as winners of the NL West. In Game 4 of the NL Division Series (NLDS) against the Atlanta Braves, with San Francisco leading 3–2, Casilla pitched a scoreless seventh inning. He also got two outs in the eighth inning before left-hander Javier López was summoned to finish the inning. The Giants won 3–2, clinching a trip to the NL Championship Series (NLCS) against the Philadelphia Phillies. Casilla came on in relief in Game 2 with the Giants trailing 3–1, the bases loaded, but two outs in the seventh. However, he gave up a bases-clearing double to Jimmy Rollins, and San Francisco lost 6–1. In Game 4, he allowed another bases-clearing double, this time to Placido Polanco but with only two men on base. Casilla also gave up a run of his own on a wild pitch. However, the Giants won 6–5 and went on to defeat the Phillies in six games. Against the Texas Rangers in Game 1 of the World Series, Casilla entered with the Giants up 8–4 and two runners on in the sixth. He struck out Elvis Andrus, then pitched a scoreless seventh as the Giants won 11–7. Casilla earned his first World Series ring as the Giants won the series in five games to win their first title since 1954.

==== 2011 ====
Casilla returned to the Giants in 2011, but after pitching on Opening Day (March 31), he was placed on the disabled list with inflammation in his right elbow. The injury had affected his velocity since spring training. After returning on May 28, he pitched well, keeping his ERA under 2.00 for most of the season. He took over as San Francisco's closer after Wilson went on the disabled list on August 21. Over the remainder of the year, he was a perfect 6-for-6 in save chances. In 49 games, he had a 2–2 record, a 1.74 ERA, 45 strikeouts, 25 walks, and 33 hits allowed in 51 2/3 innings pitched. Among NL relief pitchers, only Eric O'Flaherty had a lower ERA, with an 0.98 figure.

==== 2012 ====
In 2012, Casilla took over as the Giants closer again after Wilson was injured and lost for the season in April. He converted 20 of his first 21 save opportunities but blew 5 of his next 9 save situations, posting a 7.71 ERA from June 23 through August 7. Bochy removed him from the role on August 7, replacing him with Sergio Romo and Javier López for the rest of the year. Casilla picked up his first career base hit, a bases-loaded, two-out RBI ground ball single between Diamondbacks first baseman Paul Goldschmidt and second baseman Aaron Hill, on September 14 in a 6–2 win. "I think we were all kind of shocked he made contact," Giants manager Bruce Bochy stated. "He found a good place." In 73 games, he had a 7–6 record, a 2.84 ERA, 55 strikeouts, 22 walks, and 55 hits allowed in 63 1/3 innings pitched. Despite only serving as the closer for part of the year, Casilla tied with Kenley Jansen for 10th in the NL with 25 saves.

The Giants won the NL West again in 2012. Casilla appeared in all five games of the NLDS against the Cincinnati Reds. In Game 1, he came on with San Francisco trailing in the ninth and allowed two runs, though only one was earned, as the Giants lost 5–2. However, he allowed no runs in the other four games, as San Francisco won the series in five games. In the NLCS against the St. Louis Cardinals, Casilla pitched in his sixth playoff game in a row in Game 1, did not pitch in the next three, and pitched in three straight to finish the series. He did not allow any runs as San Francisco rallied from a 3–1 deficit to defeat the Cardinals in seven games. Against the Detroit Tigers in Game 2 of the 2012 World Series, Casilla relieved Madison Bumgarner to begin the eighth with the Giants leading 1–0. He threw a scoreless inning, helping preserve a 2–0 victory. In Game 4, he came on with two outs in the ninth and got Gerald Laird to ground out to end the inning, then picked up the win after the Giants scored in the 10th, sweeping the Detroit Tigers to win the series.

==== 2013 ====
On December 17, 2012, Casilla received a contract extension for $15 million over three years, along with an option for a fourth season. Prior to the 2013 MLB season, Casilla represented the Dominican Republic in the World Baseball Classic, pitching five scoreless innings as his country won the tournament. He pitched two scoreless innings for a save on April 13 against the Cubs when Romo was unavailable after pitching 4 out of the 5 previous days. On May 21, Casilla was placed on the 15-day disabled list with knee soreness, ultimately requiring surgery to remove a cyst. He did not return until July 13. On September 11, he had his second save of the year, pitching a scoreless ninth in a 4–3 win over the Colorado Rockies. In 57 games, he had a 7–2 record, two saves, a 2.16 ERA, 38 strikeouts, 25 walks, and 39 hits allowed in 50 innings pitched.

==== 2014 ====
On May 22, 2014, Casilla was placed on the disabled list after tweaking his hamstring while running to first base. Bochy had told him not to even bother swinging, but he disregarded his manager's orders. "I was shocked he was running like that. Guess he thought he had a hit," Bochy said. He was activated on June 16. In 28 outings through June 29, Casilla posted a 1.11 ERA. On June 30, Bochy removed the struggling Romo from the closer role on that date, announcing that the team intended to go to a closer-by-committee. However, Casilla got most of the opportunities for the rest of the season. He converted 17 saves for the rest of the year, blowing only one on August 27, in a game the Giants won anyway. In 54 games, he had a 3–3 record, 19 saves, a 1.70 ERA, 45 strikeouts, 15 walks, and 35 hits allowed in 58 1/3 innings.

The Giants made the playoffs in 2014 as a Wild Card team, then defeated the Pirates in the NL Wild Card Game. In the NLDS against the Washington Nationals, Casilla made three scoreless appearances, earning two saves as the Giants defeated Washington in four games. Against the Cardinals in the NLCS, he pitched scoreless innings in three of the first four games, earning saves in Game 1 and Game 4. He entered a tied Game 5 in the top of the ninth and loaded the bases by giving up a walk and a couple of hits, but Jeremy Affeldt got Oscar Taveras to ground out to end the inning with no runs scoring, and Travis Ishikawa homered in the bottom of the inning to give the Giants a 6–3 triumph, clinching a 4–1 series victory. He made only two appearances in the World Series against the Kansas City Royals, recording an out apiece in Games 2 and 3, both losses. For the third time in his career, Casilla became a World Series champion as the Giants defeated Kansas City in seven games.

==== 2015 ====
Casilla remained the Giants closer in 2015. He picked up back-to-back wins against the Los Angeles Dodgers on April 22 and 23, pitching scoreless innings in 3–2 victories. From May 2 through May 29, he converted 9 straight saves, posting an 0.87 ERA. On May 17, in a 9–8 win over the Cincinnati Reds at Great American Ball Park, Casilla entered the bottom on the ninth inning and struck out three batters on nine pitches, recording the save. Casilla was first Giant to pitch an immaculate inning since Trevor Wilson did so in 1992. From August 13 through September 27, he converted 10 straight saves, posting an 0.56 ERA. In 67 games, he had a 4–2 record, 38 saves in 44 opportunities, a 2.79 ERA, 62 strikeouts, 23 walks, and 51 hits allowed in 58 innings. He tied with Francisco Rodríguez for fifth in the NL in saves.

==== 2016 ====
After his successful 2015 season, Casilla struggled in 2016. He did achieve a milestone on April 25, pitching the final 1 1/3 innings against the San Diego Padres for his 100th save. On May 12, Bochy pulled him from a save situation against the Diamondbacks, opting to have left-hander López face the left-handed Jake Lamb after Casilla had loaded the bases. López got the out, but Casilla was angry with Bochy afterwards, saying, "I thought he had confidence in me." He blew his ninth save of the year on September 17 and drew boos from the fans at AT&T Park. Afterwards, he told reporters, "I’m having bad luck. I try to do my best. I’m not going to be sad or kill myself. It’s a game." Steward wrote that "after that night, public opinion essentially forced Bochy’s hand not to use him again in an important situation, particularly at home." In 62 games, he had a 2–5 record, a 3.57 ERA, 65 strikeouts, 19 walks, and 50 hits allowed in 58 innings. He finished sixth in the NL with 31 saves but led the NL and tied with Nate Jones for the major league lead in blown saves, with nine.

The Giants reached the playoffs again as a Wild Card team in 2016, then defeated the New York Mets in the 2016 NL Wild Card Game. His only appearance of the NLDS against the Cubs came in Game 2, when he got the final two outs of the sixth inning in a 5–2 loss. In Game 4, the Giants led 5–2 entering the ninth. Though it was a save situation, Bochy opted not to use Casilla. The Cubs rallied against five other Giants relievers and won 6–5 to clinch the series. After the season, the Giants declined their option on Casilla, making him a free agent.

Steward observed, "He was one of their pillar players during this still-magnificent era, one of just eight to be part of all three World Series championship teams." With the Giants, his playoff ERA was 0.92. His 123 saves rank sixth on the franchise's all-time list. Steward suggested that had Casilla not pitched for the Giants, the team would not have won any of those World Series.

=== Oakland Athletics, second stint (2017–2018) ===
On January 20, 2017, Casilla signed a two-year, $11 million contract with the Oakland Athletics. Visa problems caused him to be three weeks late to spring training, and he decided not to pitch for the Dominican Republic in the 2017 World Baseball Classic, even though he had initially been selected to the team. He was expected to compete for the closer's role, though Jane Lee of MLB.com wrote in January that the likely favorite was Ryan Madson, who had closed for the Athletics the season before. Oakland began the season without a closer named, though, and on April 11, manager Bob Melvin said in an interview that "It's gonna be [Sean] Doolittle or Casilla depending on the match-ups". Doolittle was out during the month of May with a strained left shoulder, however, giving Casilla the bulk of the early-season opportunities. He converted saves in 14 of 17 chances through the end of June but struggled in July, blowing three of five save opportunities. In August, he was replaced as closer by the newly acquired Blake Treinen. He was 16 for 23 in save opportunities. In 63 games, he had a 4–5 record and an ERA of 4.27 with 57 strikeouts in 59 innings pitched.

Casilla got his only save of 2018 on April 24, when he allowed no runs in the ninth inning of a 3–2 victory over the Rangers. On July 13, he entered a game against the Giants with the bases loaded and no one out in the seventh. He allowed all three of the runners to score, one of which was on a wild pitch, and the Athletics lost 7–1. The next day, he was designated for assignment. Five days later, he was released. In 26 games, he had no record, a 3.16 ERA, 22 strikeouts, 22 walks, and 18 hits allowed in 31 1/3 innings.

=== Colorado Rockies ===
On July 26, 2018, Casilla signed a minor league deal with the Colorado Rockies organization. He spent the rest of the year in Triple–A with the PCL's Albuquerque Isotopes. In 12 games, he had an 0–2 record, an 8.03 ERA, 12 strikeouts, nine walks, and 16 hits in 12 1/3 innings. Casilla became elected free agency following the season on November 2.

== Career overall ==
=== Statistics and achievements ===
Category	W	L	ERA	G	GS	CG	SHO	SV	IP	H	R	ER	HR	BB	IBB	SO	HBP	ERA+	FIP	WHIP	H/9	SO/9	Ref.
Total	42	31	3.29	655	0	0	0	144	645.1	552	253	236	58	277	33	583	38	119	3.94	1.285	7.7	8.1	

== Career statistics and scouting report ==
Spending parts of 15 seasons in the major leagues, Casilla appeared in 655 games. He had a 42–31 record, a 3.29 ERA, 583 strikeouts, 277 walks, and 552 hits allowed in 645 1/3 innings pitched. Used as a closer at times during his career, he recorded 144 saves.

Casilla worked with a prototypical power pitcher repertoire, chiefly throwing a low to mid-90s two-seam fastball and a hard-breaking slider. He also threw a curveball and an occasional changeup. Though relief pitchers often specialize in one or two pitches, Casilla's time as a starting pitcher in the minor leagues caused him to develop a four-pitch repertoire.

Casilla's fastball travelled up to 98 miles per hour (158 km/h). Scouts praised his slider, and in 2015, Mike Petriello of MLB.com compared it to those thrown by Stephen Strasburg and Matt Harvey. He stopped throwing the curveball from 2007 through 2009. Over the 2009-10 offseason, while Casilla was working out in the Dominican Republic, pitcher Ricardo Rodríguez suggested he work on improving his curveball. Casilla brought it back over 10 percent of the time in 2010, throwing it at least 20 percent of the time from 2014 through the end of his career. "That pitch has helped me a lot," he said. The Los Angeles Times wrote in June 2007 that "Casilla locates his fastball well," but Casilla had issues controlling his pitches at times during his career. Unlike Giants relievers such as Wilson and Romo, Casilla usually maintained a calm demeanor on the mound. "I am emotional, but I try to keep that inside," he says.

== Personal life ==
Casilla is married, and he has four children. A churchgoer, he regularly carries a Bible with him. His native language is Spanish, and even after over 10 seasons in the major leagues, he still used an interpreter when conversing with reporters. His brother, Jose, was a pitcher in the Giants system from 2006 through 2016, making it as far as Triple-A, though he never reached the major leagues.

== See also ==
- List of Major League Baseball career saves leaders
