= 2014 National League Championship Series =

| Team (Wins) | Managers | Season |
|---|---|---|
| San Francisco Giants (4) | Bruce Bochy | 88–74 (.543), GB: 6 |
| St. Louis Cardinals (1) | Mike Matheny | 90–72 (.556), GA: 2 |
- Dates: October 11–16
- MVP: Madison Bumgarner (San Francisco)
- Umpires: Gerry Davis (crew chief), Phil Cuzzi (Games 1–2), Bill Welke, Mark Carlson, Greg Gibson, Bill Miller, Paul Emmel (Games 3–5)

Broadcast
- Television: Fox (Game 1); FS1 (Games 2–5)
- TV announcers: Joe Buck, Harold Reynolds, Tom Verducci, Ken Rosenthal, and Erin Andrews
- Radio: ESPN
- Radio announcers: Dan Shulman and Aaron Boone
- NLDS: San Francisco Giants over Washington Nationals (3–1); St. Louis Cardinals over Los Angeles Dodgers (3–1)

The 2014 National League Championship Series was a best-of-seven playoff in Major League Baseball’s 2014 postseason pitting the defending National League champion and third-seeded St. Louis Cardinals against the fifth-seeded San Francisco Giants for the National League pennant and the right to play in the 2014 World Series. The series was the 45th NLCS in league history with Fox airing Game 1 and Fox Sports 1 airing Games 2–5 in the United States. Game 1 was simulcast on Fox Sports 1 and was hosted by Kevin Burkhardt, Gabe Kapler and C.J. Nitkowski, who offered sabermetric analysis of the game.

This was the fourth time the two teams have met in the postseason (1987 NLCS, 2002 NLCS, and 2012 NLCS). The Cardinals, by virtue of being a division winner, had the home field advantage. The Giants clinched their third pennant within a five-year span, with NLCS wins in 2010 and 2012.

The Giants would go on to defeat the Kansas City Royals in the World Series in seven games, winning their third World Series championship in five years.

== Matchup ==
=== St. Louis Cardinals vs San Francisco Giants ===
San Francisco won the series, 4–1.

| Game | Date | Score | Location | Time | Attendance |
|---|---|---|---|---|---|
| 1 | October 11 | San Francisco Giants – 3, St. Louis Cardinals – 0 | Busch Stadium | 3:23 | 47,201 |
| 2 | October 12 | San Francisco Giants – 4, St. Louis Cardinals – 5 | Busch Stadium | 3:41 | 46,262 |
| 3 | October 14 | St. Louis Cardinals – 4, San Francisco Giants – 5 (10) | AT&T Park | 3:10 | 42,716 |
| 4 | October 15 | St. Louis Cardinals – 4, San Francisco Giants – 6 | AT&T Park | 3:53 | 43,147 |
| 5 | October 16 | St. Louis Cardinals – 3, San Francisco Giants – 6 | AT&T Park | 3:03 | 43,217 |

== Game summaries ==
=== Game 1 ===
October 11, 2014 8:07 p.m. (EDT) at Busch Stadium in St. Louis, Missouri 54 °F (12 °C), cloudy
| Team | 1 | 2 | 3 | 4 | 5 | 6 | 7 | 8 | 9 | R | H | E |
|---|---|---|---|---|---|---|---|---|---|---|---|---|
| San Francisco | 0 | 2 | 1 | 0 | 0 | 0 | 0 | 0 | 0 | 3 | 8 | 0 |
| St. Louis | 0 | 0 | 0 | 0 | 0 | 0 | 0 | 0 | 0 | 0 | 4 | 1 |
WP: Madison Bumgarner (1–0) LP: Adam Wainwright (0–1) Sv: Santiago Casilla (1); Attendance: 47,201; Boxscore

Madison Bumgarner and the Giants bullpen pitched a shutout and limited the Cardinals to only 4 hits. The Giants scored first in the top of the second off Cardinals starter Adam Wainwright. With the bases loaded, Travis Ishikawa hit a bloop single to left to drive in the first run of the game. The Giants took a 2–0 lead when Gregor Blanco reached safely on a Matt Carpenter error. The Giants tacked on a third run in the top of the third on a Brandon Belt sacrifice fly. The Cardinals threatened to score in the bottom of the seventh, with runners at second and third with two outs. Bumgarner appeared to balk when he stepped off the mound while facing Tony Cruz, but no balk was called by the umpires. Bumgarner recovered to strike out Cruz and got two more outs in the eighth before giving way to Sergio Romo who retired Matt Holliday to end the eighth. Santiago Casilla pitched a 1-2-3 ninth to close out a 3–0 victory for the Giants.

=== Game 2 ===
October 12, 2014 8:07 p.m. (EDT) at Busch Stadium in St. Louis, Missouri 62 °F (17 °C), overcast
| Team | 1 | 2 | 3 | 4 | 5 | 6 | 7 | 8 | 9 | R | H | E |
|---|---|---|---|---|---|---|---|---|---|---|---|---|
| San Francisco | 0 | 0 | 0 | 0 | 1 | 1 | 1 | 0 | 1 | 4 | 10 | 0 |
| St. Louis | 0 | 0 | 1 | 1 | 0 | 0 | 1 | 1 | 1 | 5 | 8 | 0 |
WP: Seth Maness (1–0) LP: Sergio Romo (0–1); Home runs: SF: None; STL: Matt Carpenter (1), Oscar Taveras (1), Matt Adams (1), Kolten Wong (1); Attendance: 46,262; Boxscore

Game 2 was a back-and-forth affair that ended on a Kolten Wong walk-off home run in the ninth inning to give the Cardinals a 5–4 win. The Cardinals struck first when Matt Carpenter hit a home run off Jake Peavy in the bottom of the third. Randal Grichuk's bases-loaded singled in the fourth made it 2–0. The Giants cut the lead in half when Joaquín Árias pinch-hit for Peavy in the top of the fifth and scored Brandon Belt on an RBI groundout. In the sixth, the Giants tied it up on a Pablo Sandoval double and Hunter Pence single. The Giants took the lead in the top of the seventh on an RBI single from Gregor Blanco off Cardinals reliever Carlos Martínez. The Cardinals tied it back up in the bottom of the seventh on a pinch-hit home run from Oscar Taveras off Jean Machi. In the bottom of the eighth, Matt Adams gave the Cardinals a 4–3 lead on another home run, this time off Hunter Strickland. The Cardinals brought in closer Trevor Rosenthal in the top of the ninth, but he could not hold the lead. With one out, Andrew Susac singled and Matt Duffy came on as a pinch runner. Juan Pérez singled to put runners at first and second. After Blanco lined out, Joe Panik worked a walk, with ball four coming on a wild pitch that allowed Duffy to score the tying run from second base. The Cardinals were able to escape the inning without further damage. With the game tied 4–4 in the bottom of the ninth, Wong lined the second pitch from Sergio Romo over the right field wall for the walk-off home run, the Cardinals' fourth home run of the game.

=== Game 3 ===
October 14, 2014 4:07 p.m. (EDT) at AT&T Park in San Francisco, California 65 °F (18 °C), overcast
| Team | 1 | 2 | 3 | 4 | 5 | 6 | 7 | 8 | 9 | 10 | R | H | E |
|---|---|---|---|---|---|---|---|---|---|---|---|---|---|
| St. Louis | 0 | 0 | 0 | 2 | 0 | 1 | 1 | 0 | 0 | 0 | 4 | 9 | 1 |
| San Francisco | 4 | 0 | 0 | 0 | 0 | 0 | 0 | 0 | 0 | 1 | 5 | 6 | 0 |
WP: Sergio Romo (1–1) LP: Randy Choate (0–1); Home runs: STL: Randal Grichuk (1); SF: None; Attendance: 42,716; Boxscore

As the series shifted to San Francisco, the Giants took a 2–1 series lead after Cardinals reliever Randy Choate's wild throw on a bunt in the bottom of the 10th inning allowed Brandon Crawford to score the winning run. The Giants got to Cardinals starter John Lackey in the bottom the first. With two outs, Buster Posey and Pablo Sandoval both singled, and Posey scored when Hunter Pence hit a double to right field. With runners at second and third, the Cardinals intentionally walked Brandon Belt to load the bases. Travis Ishikawa hit a deep drive to right-center that was nearly a grand slam but was blown back towards the outfield due to a strong wind blowing in from right field. Ishikawa's double scored all three runners to give the Giants an early 4–0 lead. Lackey settled down to keep the Giants scoreless after that, allowing the Cardinals to chip away at the Giants' lead. A Kolten Wong triple in the top of the fourth off Giants starter Tim Hudson knocked in two runs to cut the Giants lead in half. The Cardinals cut the lead to 4–3 with a Jhonny Peralta RBI single in the sixth. Randal Grichuk's home run in the top of the seventh tied the game at 4–4. As the bullpens took over, the game remained tied until the bottom of the tenth inning when Choate issued a leadoff walk to Crawford and a single to Juan Pérez. After Gregor Blanco attempted to bunt the runners over, Choate threw wildly to first base, allowing Crawford to score the winning run.

=== Game 4 ===
October 15, 2014 8:07 p.m. (EDT) at AT&T Park in San Francisco, California 66 °F (19 °C), mostly cloudy
| Team | 1 | 2 | 3 | 4 | 5 | 6 | 7 | 8 | 9 | R | H | E |
|---|---|---|---|---|---|---|---|---|---|---|---|---|
| St. Louis | 1 | 1 | 2 | 0 | 0 | 0 | 0 | 0 | 0 | 4 | 11 | 0 |
| San Francisco | 1 | 0 | 2 | 0 | 0 | 3 | 0 | 0 | X | 6 | 11 | 0 |
WP: Yusmeiro Petit (1–0) LP: Marco Gonzales (0–1) Sv: Santiago Casilla (2); Home runs: STL: Kolten Wong (2); SF: None; Attendance: 43,147; Boxscore

The Cardinals struck first in the top of the first on Matt Adams's RBI single off of Ryan Vogelsong with two on, but the Giants tied the game in the bottom of the inning on Buster Posey's sacrifice fly off of Shelby Miller with runners on first and third. The Cardinals retook the lead in the second when Kolten Wong hit a leadoff double and scored on A. J. Pierzynski's single. In the third with runners on first and third with no outs, Jhonny Peralta's double play scored Matt Holliday before Wong's home run made it 4–1 Cardinals. Yusmeiro Petit came on in relief for the Giants and pitched three scoreless innings. In the bottom of the third, Posey's single scored Joaquin Arias from third with two outs and after a walk, Posey scored on Hunter Pence's single. In the bottom of the sixth, with runners on second and third with one out off of Marco Gonzales, Gregor Blanco's fielder's choice and Joe Panik's groundout scored a run each, then Posey's RBI single off of Seth Maness gave the Giants a 6–4 lead. Five Giants relievers combined to get the final nine outs and give the Giants a 3–1 series lead.

=== Game 5 ===
October 16, 2014 8:07 p.m. (EDT) at AT&T Park in San Francisco, California 66 °F (19 °C), partly cloudy
| Team | 1 | 2 | 3 | 4 | 5 | 6 | 7 | 8 | 9 | R | H | E |
|---|---|---|---|---|---|---|---|---|---|---|---|---|
| St. Louis | 0 | 0 | 1 | 2 | 0 | 0 | 0 | 0 | 0 | 3 | 6 | 0 |
| San Francisco | 0 | 0 | 2 | 0 | 0 | 0 | 0 | 1 | 3 | 6 | 7 | 0 |
WP: Jeremy Affeldt (1–0) LP: Michael Wacha (0–1); Home runs: STL: Matt Adams (2), Tony Cruz (1); SF: Joe Panik (1), Michael Morse (1), Travis Ishikawa (1); Attendance: 43,217; Boxscore

Game 5 was a rematch of Game 1 starters Madison Bumgarner and Adam Wainwright. The Cardinals got to Bumgarner first, scoring a run after two walks and a Jon Jay double in the top of the third. The Giants responded in the bottom of the third when Joe Panik hit a two-run home run to right field, the Giants' first home run since Brandon Belt's game winner in Game 2 of the NLDS, a drought that lasted six games and 242 plate appearances. The Giants' lead didn't last long, as Bumgarner gave up home runs to Matt Adams and Tony Cruz in the top of the fourth. Both starters settled down as Bumgarner retired the final 13 batters he faced, and Wainwright retired his final 10 straight. The Cardinals carried a 3–2 lead into the eighth inning and brought in Pat Neshek to hold the lead. Pinch hitter Michael Morse knocked a home run to left to tie the game at 3–3. Neshek retired the next three batters. In the top of the ninth, Santiago Casilla gave up a single and two walks, leading manager Bruce Bochy to bring in Jeremy Affeldt, who retired Oscar Taveras (in what would be his final at-bat before his death 10 days later in a car accident) to escape the jam.

In the bottom of the ninth, the Cardinals brought in Michael Wacha, who put two runners on before giving up a 3-run walk-off home run to Travis Ishikawa that clinched the pennant for the Giants, sending San Francisco to its third World Series appearance in five seasons. Ishikawa's home run was the first to send a National League team to the World Series since Giants' Bobby Thomson's Shot Heard 'Round the World in 1951. Ishikawa's home run was the first ever to end an NLCS and the fourth to end any LCS, after Chris Chambliss (1976 ALCS), Aaron Boone (2003 ALCS), and Magglio Ordonez (2006 ALCS). All previous pennant winners on a walk off home run, including Thomson's, lost the World Series. It was the first walk off of any kind to end the NLCS since an RBI single by San Francisco Giant center fielder Kenny Lofton in Game 5 of the 2002 NLCS, which was coincidentally against the Cardinals.

Fox Sports play-by-play commentator Joe Buck's call of "...the Giants win the pennant!" on Ishikawa's home run mimicked Russ Hodges' call of Thomson's pennant-winning home run, occurring 63 years and 13 days apart from each other.

== Composite line score ==
2014 NLCS (4–1): San Francisco Giants over St. Louis Cardinals

| Team | 1 | 2 | 3 | 4 | 5 | 6 | 7 | 8 | 9 | 10 | R | H | E |
|---|---|---|---|---|---|---|---|---|---|---|---|---|---|
| San Francisco Giants | 5 | 2 | 5 | 0 | 1 | 4 | 1 | 1 | 4 | 1 | 24 | 42 | 0 |
| St. Louis Cardinals | 1 | 1 | 4 | 5 | 0 | 1 | 2 | 1 | 1 | 0 | 16 | 38 | 2 |
Total attendance: 222,543 Average attendance: 44,509

== Aftermath ==
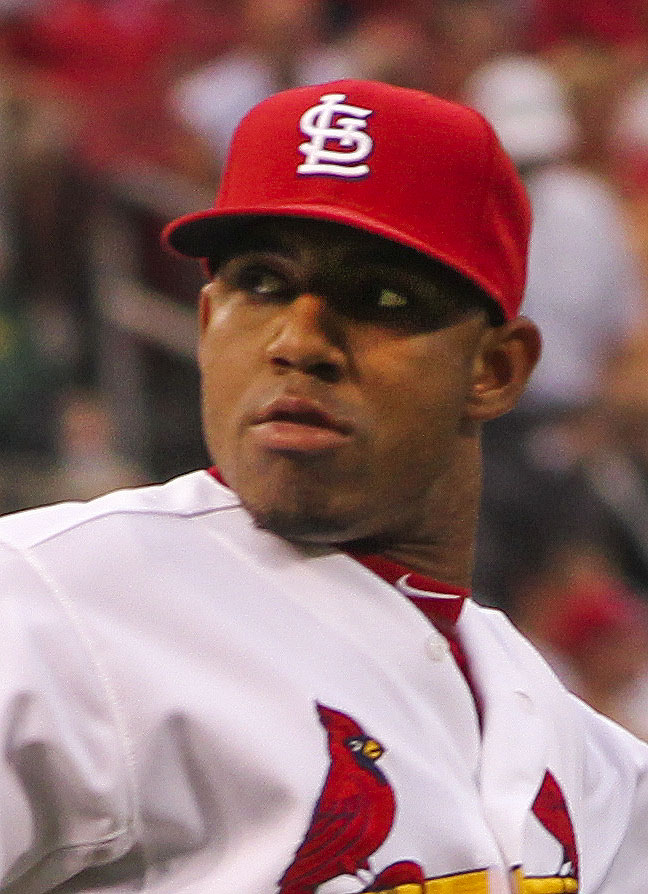
St. Louis outfielder Oscar Tavares passed away 10 days after the conclusion of the NLCS.

On October 26, 2014, tragedy befell the St. Louis Cardinals and Major League Baseball when Oscar Taveras and his girlfriend, Edilia Arvelo, died in a car accident in the Dominican Republic shortly after the Cardinals were eliminated from the playoffs, and exactly 2 weeks after Taveras's final career home run in Game 2. Taveras was just 22 years old.

The Giants would ride Madison Bumgarner's clutch pitching to their third World Series in five seasons, in what was considered one of the best individual pitching performances in postseason history. Bumgarner would be the seventh player to win a LCS and World Series MVP in the same postseason, and just the fourth pitcher, joining the Orel Hershiser in 1988, Livan Hernandez in 1997, and Cole Hamels in 2008.

The 2014 season was an end of an era for both the Cardinals and Giants. Between the two ballclubs, they won NL pennants in every year starting in 2010 and ending in 2014, with the Giants had winning pennants in 2010, 2012, and 2014 (they won the World Series in each of these seasons), while the Cardinals won in 2011 and 2013 (winning the World Series in 2011). The Cardinals dedicated the 2015 season to Taveras after his death and they posted the best record in the National League. However, they were upset by the rival Cubs in the National League Division Series. The Cardinals did not make the postseason again until 2019. In 2016, the Giants made the playoffs again as a wildcard, but lost to the eventual World Champion Cubs in the National League Division Series. The Giants would bottom out with a 98-loss season in 2017 and did not return to the postseason until 2021. By then, manager Bruce Bochy and most of the players from the 2010–2014 teams were gone, although some of the core members remained, such as catcher Buster Posey, first baseman Brandon Belt, and shortshop Brandon Crawford.

Travis Ishikawa would be the last walk-off home run to clinch a pennant for only five years. In the 2019 American League Championship Series, Jose Altuve sent the Houston Astros to the World Series via a two-run home run off of Aroldis Chapman.
