= Michael Morse =

American baseball player (born 1982)

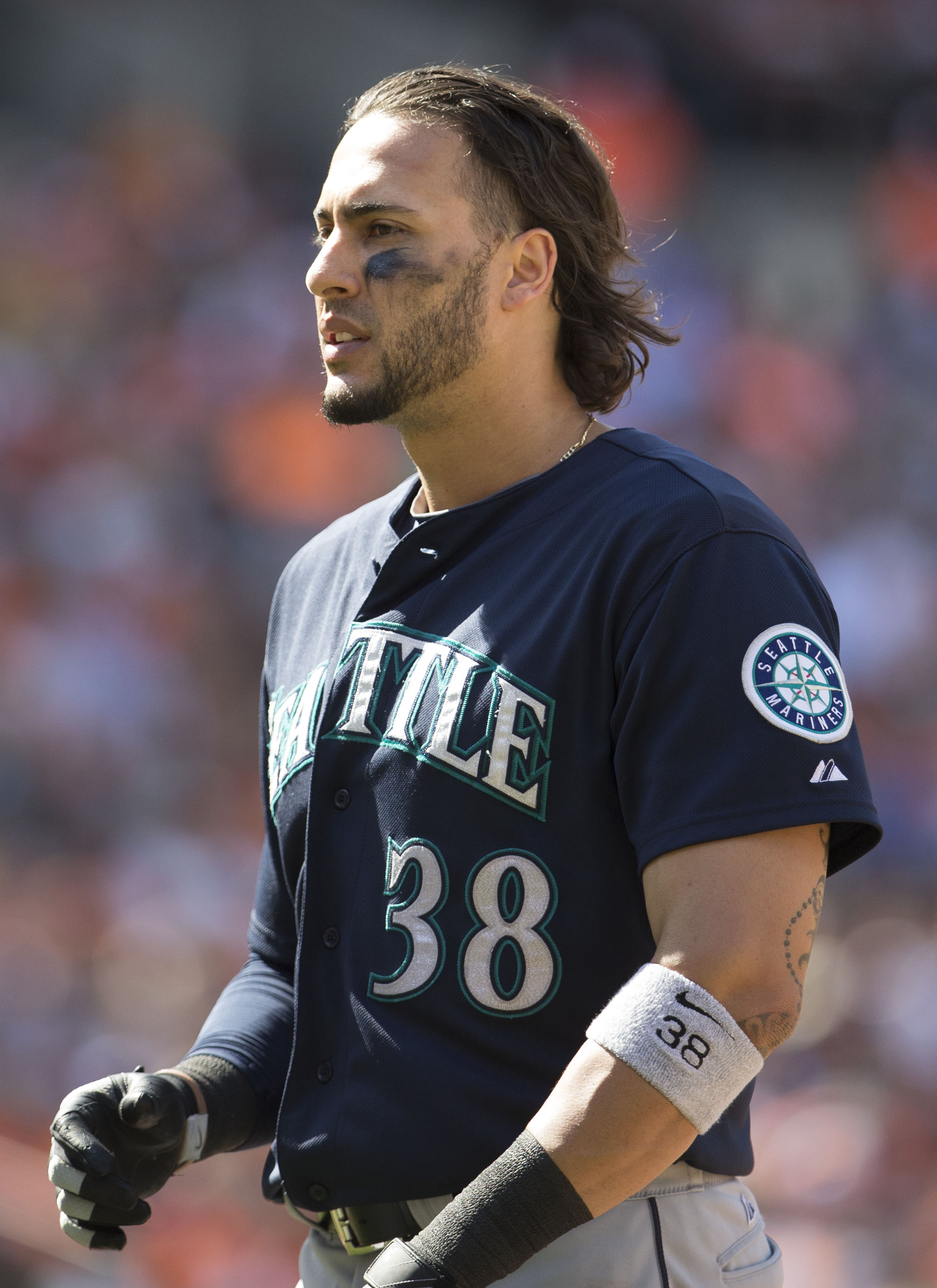
- Morse with the Seattle Mariners in 2013
- Outfielder / First baseman
- Born: March 22, 1982 (age 44); Fort Lauderdale, Florida, U.S.
- Batted: Right Threw: Right

MLB debut
- May 31, 2005, for the Seattle Mariners

Last MLB appearance
- May 29, 2017, for the San Francisco Giants

MLB statistics
- Batting average: .274
- Home runs: 105
- Runs batted in: 355
- Stats at Baseball Reference

Teams
- Seattle Mariners (2005–2008); Washington Nationals (2009–2012); Seattle Mariners (2013); Baltimore Orioles (2013); San Francisco Giants (2014); Miami Marlins (2015); Pittsburgh Pirates (2015–2016); San Francisco Giants (2017)

Career highlights and awards
- World Series champion (2014)

Michael John Morse (born March 22, 1982) is an American former professional baseball outfielder, first baseman and shortstop. Morse was selected by the Chicago White Sox in the third round (82nd overall) of the 2000 Major League Baseball draft. He played in Major League Baseball (MLB) for the Seattle Mariners, Washington Nationals, Baltimore Orioles, Miami Marlins, Pittsburgh Pirates and San Francisco Giants between 2005 and 2017. In 2018, he began a second career as a baseball broadcaster.

== Early life ==
Michael John Morse was born on March 22, 1982, in Fort Lauderdale, Florida. Morse lived with his siblings and grandparents in Jamaica until the age of six when he moved back to his birthplace. Morse, raised by his single mother, attended Nova High School in Davie, Florida, the alma mater of fellow major leaguer Anthony Swarzak. At Nova High, Morse was also a quarterback for the football team, following in the footsteps of his older brother, T.K.

== Professional career ==
=== Draft and minor leagues ===
Morse was selected by the Chicago White Sox in the third round (82nd overall) of the 2000 Major League Baseball draft as a shortstop. During his time in the minors, Morse primarily played shortstop and also filled in as a third baseman.

=== Seattle Mariners (2005–2008) ===
Beginning the 2005 season with the Triple-A Tacoma Rainiers, he made his major league debut on May 31, 2005. Although Morse made it to the big leagues as a shortstop, with the arrival of Yuniesky Betancourt Morse began to develop as a utility player, having spent time at first base and left field. In 2005, he was suspended for 10 days for using performance-enhancing drugs. He said that it was remnants from a minor league use of PEDs two years earlier, after which he swore he'd never use them again. The scientific evidence supported the plausibility of Morse's explanation.

On July 6, 2006, Morse had surgery to repair a torn medial meniscus of his right knee. In 2008, Morse had the best batting average in the major leagues in spring training, batting .492. After playing only 5 games in 2008, Morse suffered a torn labrum diving for a ball in a game against the Los Angeles Angels of Anaheim; he had surgery to repair it and missed the rest of the season.

On April 1, 2009, Morse cleared waivers and was sent outright to the Mariners' Triple–A affiliate, the Tacoma Rainiers.

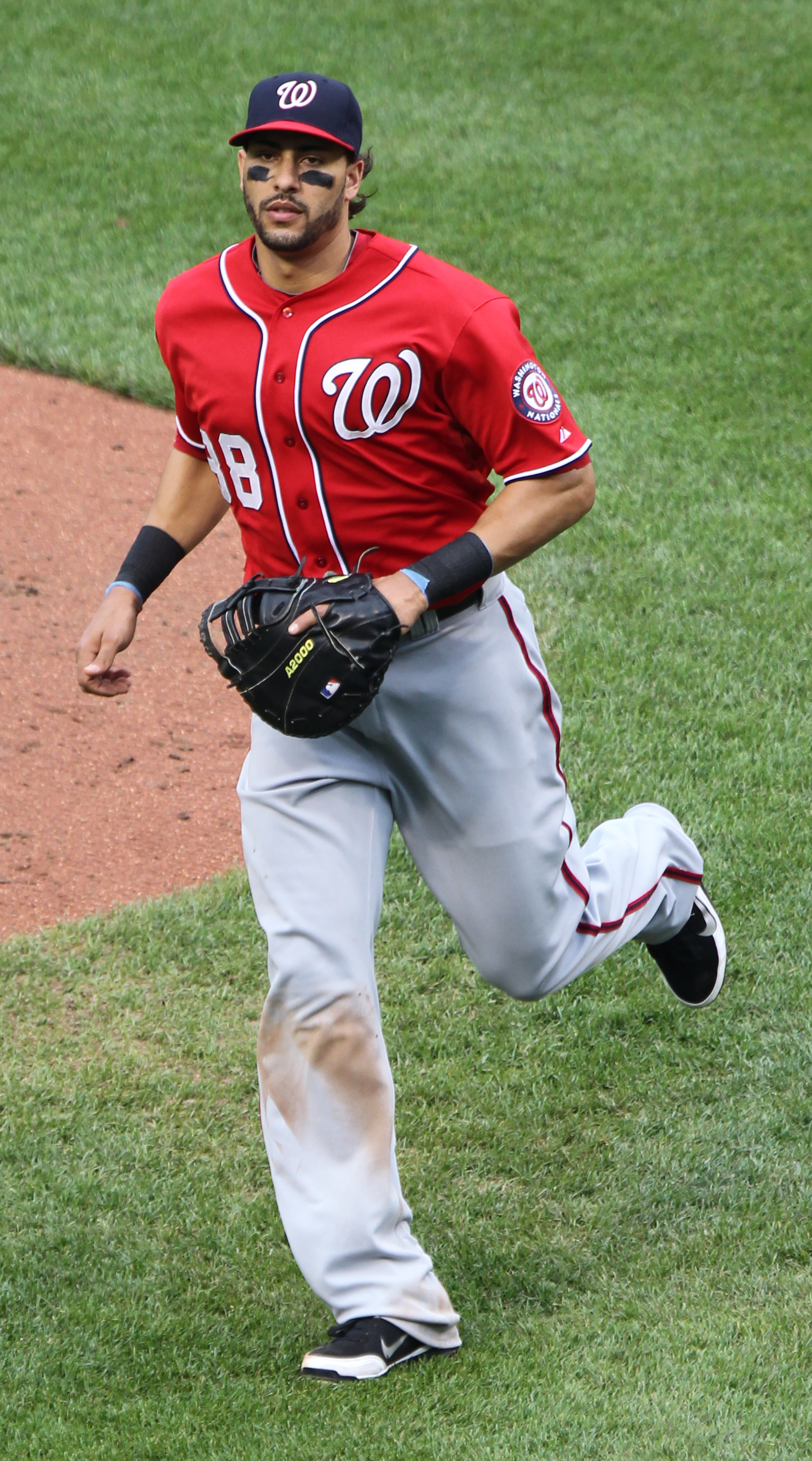
Michael Morse playing for the Washington Nationals in 2011

=== Washington Nationals (2009–2012) ===
In June 2009, the Mariners traded Morse to the Washington Nationals for outfielder Ryan Langerhans. Morse was promoted to the majors by the Nats on August 21, 2009, after hitting .322 with 16 homers and 86 RBI in 110 minor league games.

In 2010 with the Nationals, Morse played 98 games and batted .289 with a .352 on-base percentage and a .519 slugging percentage, with 15 home runs and 41 RBIs.

In 2011 spring training, Morse led the Grapefruit League with nine home runs with 18 RBI. He started the 2011 regular season in a left field platoon with Laynce Nix, but slumped on offense and was relegated mostly to pinch hitting by May. However, on May 22, 2011, Morse moved to first base when Adam LaRoche's season was ended by injury. In his first four games at first base, Morse hit three home runs with eight RBI. From May 22 to July 5, Morse had 13 home runs and 35 RBI, the most in the majors in that span of time, earning him consideration with four others for the National League's final roster spot in the 2011 All-Star Game. Morse was named to Sports Illustrated's "All-Underrated Team".

Morse finished the 2011 season with a .303 average, 31 home runs, and 95 RBI; he was in the top 10 in the National League in all three categories. He was fourth in the league in slugging percentage (.550), behind Ryan Braun, Matt Kemp, and Prince Fielder.

Morse started the 2012 season on the disabled list with a strained back muscle. He was activated on June 1, 2012 and made his season debut the next day.

On September 29, 2012 playing in Busch Stadium against the St. Louis Cardinals with the bases loaded, Morse hit a line drive to right field that bounced off the top of the fence. The ball was initially called in-play. With confusion reigning on the basepaths, Morse was tagged out trying to return to first base. The play was eventually reviewed by the umpires, who ultimately overturned the call and pronounced Morse's line drive a grand slam home run. To ensure that none of the runners passed each other on the basepath, Morse was instructed to round the bases clockwise back toward the batter's box at home plate, take a mock swing at a nonexistent pitch, and then run counter-clockwise around the bases, like a usual home run. After the season, he was awarded with the GIBBY Award for Oddity of the Year.

The chorus of Morse's at-bat song -- “Take On Me” by A-ha—notably became a favorite for Nationals fans to sing along to, so much so that it was played after “Take Me Out to the Ballgame” during the seventh-inning stretch for the first half of 2013, even though Morse was no longer on the team. Morse would continue to use this song when playing for subsequent teams. The song has been played during the seventh-inning stretch on several occasions when Morse returned to Nationals Park as either a visiting player or special guest (including when Morse threw out the first pitch and was guest of honor at Game 5 of the 2017 NLDS versus the Chicago Cubs).

=== Second stint with Seattle Mariners (2013) ===
The Nationals traded Morse to the Seattle Mariners on January 16, 2013, in a three team deal sending catcher John Jaso from Seattle to the Oakland Athletics and minor-league pitchers A. J. Cole, Blake Treinen and a player to be named later (Ian Krol) from Oakland to Washington. Morse was the Opening Day left fielder, but ended up getting most of the starts in right field until the end of May. Morse hit eight home runs in spring training and four home runs in the first four games of the season. Also, in the first thirty games, Morse hit nine home runs, the first Mariner to do that since Mike Cameron in 2002.

On May 28, Morse was starting in right field against the Padres, but left after four innings, tweaking his right quad while trying to score from first on a double. After the injury, which caused him to miss eight games, he appeared more at designated hitter and first base while trying to limit his running. On June 22, Morse was placed on the disabled list with the injury, after he felt pain while pinch-hitting against the Angels two days prior. On July 29, Morse was activated off the disabled list, and he started in right field the next day. He was used mostly at right field until his trade. In 76 games with the Mariners, Morse hit .226/.283/.410 with 13 HR and 27 RBI.

=== Baltimore Orioles (2013) ===
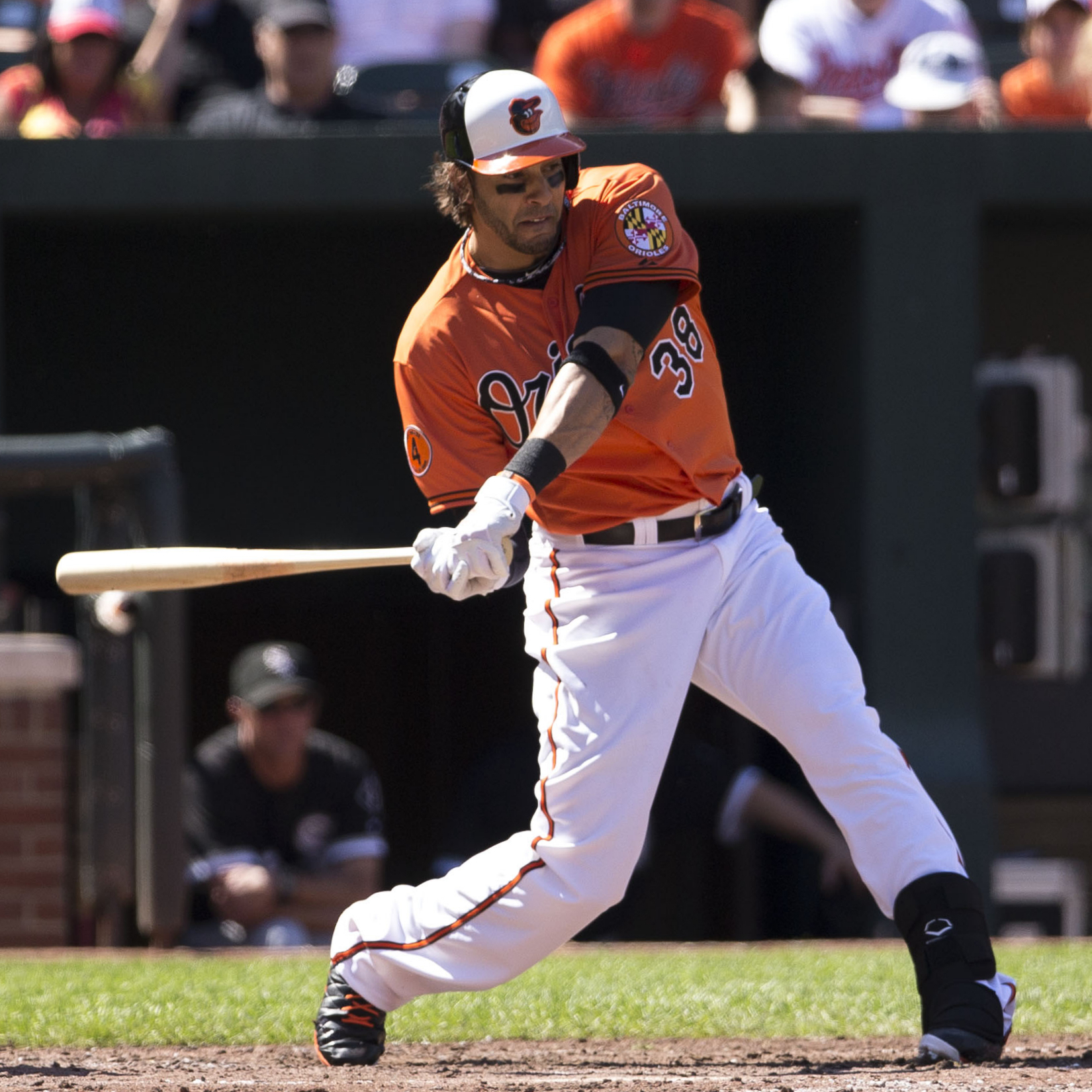
Morse with the Baltimore Orioles in 2013

On August 30, 2013, the Mariners traded Morse to the Baltimore Orioles in exchange for Xavier Avery. During his debut on September 1, against the Yankees, he went 2-for-4 with two singles, a run scored, and a strikeout. With Baltimore, he was used in either left or right field against left-handed starters. In 12 games with Baltimore, he batted .103 (3-for-29).

On October 16, Morse underwent arthroscopic surgery on his left wrist, and was expected to be back for spring training.

=== San Francisco Giants (2014) ===
Morse signed a one-year, $6 million contract with the San Francisco Giants for the 2014 season. According to Giants' manager Bruce Bochy, Morse was expected to be San Francisco's everyday left fielder. Morse played at first base for most of May and June after Brandon Belt sustained a thumb injury. On September 2, Morse was diagnosed with a strained oblique and held out of the lineup for the rest of the month, as well as the NL Wild Card game and NLDS.

During the postseason, Morse was used exclusively as a pinch-hitter and designated hitter. On October 16, in Game 5 of the 2014 National League Championship Series against the St. Louis Cardinals, he came into the game as a pinch-hitter with the Giants trailing 3–2 in the bottom of the eighth inning and hit a game-tying solo home run off Pat Neshek. The Giants would go on to win the pennant in the bottom of the ninth on Travis Ishikawa's three-run home run, sending Morse to the World Series for the first time in his career.

In the 2014 World Series, Morse had four hits in 16 at-bats and drove in four runs. The Giants defeated the Kansas City Royals in seven games, giving Morse the first World Series ring of his ten-year career. In Game 7, Morse drove in two of the team's three runs, including what proved to be the game-winning RBI in the top of the fourth inning off Royals reliever Kelvin Herrera.

=== Miami Marlins (2015) ===
On December 17, 2014, Morse signed a two-year deal with his hometown team, the Miami Marlins, worth $16 million. Morse began the 2015 season as the Marlins' starting first baseman, but he struggled and began to lose playing time to Justin Bour by May. In 2015 with Miami he batted .213/.276/.313.

=== Pittsburgh Pirates (2015–2016) ===
On July 30, 2015, in a three-team trade, the Los Angeles Dodgers acquired Morse, Mat Latos, Bronson Arroyo, Alex Wood, Jim Johnson, Luis Avilán, and José Peraza, while the Marlins acquired minor league pitchers Victor Araujo, Jeff Brigham, and Kevin Guzman, and the Atlanta Braves received Héctor Olivera, Paco Rodriguez, minor league pitcher Zachary Bird, and a competitive balance draft pick for the 2016 MLB draft. The Dodgers promptly designated Morse for assignment. The following day he was traded to the Pittsburgh Pirates in exchange for José Tábata. Morse was designated for assignment by the Pirates on April 13, 2016. He was released on April 21, 2016.

=== Second stint with San Francisco Giants (2017) ===
After his release from the Pirates, Morse did studio broadcasting work with MLB Network and CBS Radio. At Hunter Pence's wedding in November 2016, he talked to Giants' general manager Bobby Evans, who gave him a handshake deal to spring training to see if he could still contribute as a reserve major league player. On December 23, 2016, Morse signed a minor league contract with the San Francisco Giants.

Morse was called up by the Giants on April 26, 2017. In his first major league at bat in over a year, he hit an eighth-inning, game-tying pinch hit home run, mirroring his blast in Game 5 of the 2014 NLCS.

During a May 29, 2017, bench-clearing incident after Giants reliever Hunter Strickland hit Morse's former Nationals teammate Bryce Harper with a fastball and Harper charged the mound, Morse (playing first base at the time) quickly interposed himself between the two players in an effort to break up the fight. Giants starting pitcher Jeff Samardzija collided with Morse while taking a run at Harper, sending both Giants to the ground and leaving Morse with a concussion. Morse was placed on the 7-day concussion list after the game. He told the San Francisco Chronicle weeks later that he still remembered little of the altercation and was continuing to deal with concussion symptoms, for which he was receiving daily testing and treatment at Stanford University. Harper said he was "very thankful" to Morse for stepping in, noting that he could have been seriously injured if Samardzija had gotten through and hit him. Morse missed the remainder of the 2017 season as a result of the concussion. In 2017 with the Giants he batted .194/.250/.306.

== Broadcasting career ==
In 2018, Mid-Atlantic Sports Network (MASN) hired Morse as a broadcaster. From May 25 to 27, 2018, he made his broadcasting debut by filling in for Ray Knight as the studio analyst on the Nats Xtra pregame and postgame shows on MASN, working with host Johnny Holliday during a weekend three-game Washington Nationals series at the Miami Marlins. In his second stint with MASN, from June 15 to 17, 2018, he made his debut as an in-game color commentator when he substituted for F. P. Santangelo for the MASN broadcast of a three-game weekend Nationals series against the Toronto Blue Jays in Toronto, working alongside play-by-play man Bob Carpenter. He substituted again for Santangelo August 13 to 15, 2018, during the three-game Nationals series against the St. Louis Cardinals in St. Louis.

== Personal life ==
Morse married Jessica Etably in 2012. They reside in Fort Lauderdale, Florida, and have a daughter and a son.
