= Oscar Taveras =

Dominican–Canadian baseball player (1992–2014)

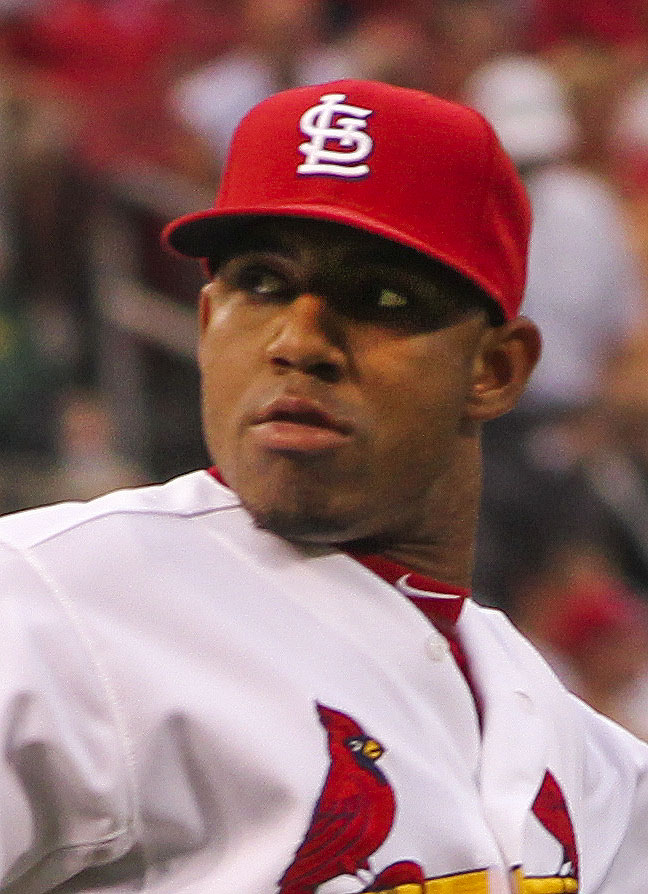
- Taveras with the St. Louis Cardinals in 2014
- Right fielder
- Born: June 19, 1992; Puerto Plata, Dominican Republic
- Died: October 26, 2014 (aged 22); Puerto Plata, Dominican Republic
- Batted: Left Threw: Left

MLB debut
- May 31, 2014, for the St. Louis Cardinals

Last MLB appearance
- September 28, 2014, for the St. Louis Cardinals

MLB statistics
- Batting average: .239
- Home runs: 3
- Runs batted in: 22
- Stats at Baseball Reference

Teams
- St. Louis Cardinals (2014)

Oscar Francisco Taveras (June 19, 1992 – October 26, 2014) was a Dominican professional baseball outfielder who played one season for the St. Louis Cardinals of Major League Baseball (MLB). Known as "El Fenómeno" (Spanish for "The Phenomenon") in the Dominican Republic, the Cardinals signed him at age 16 in 2008 as an international amateur free agent and he made his MLB debut in 2014. Over six minor league seasons, he batted .321 with a .519 slugging percentage. He played all three outfield positions while spending most of the time in center field.

As a batter, Taveras was a consensus top-five minor league prospect in 2013 and 2014. He elicited comparisons to former MLB outfielder and fellow Dominican Vladimir Guerrero—with a powerful, balanced stroke, Taveras successfully hit pitches well outside of the strike zone. Also similar to Guerrero, he possessed a strong and accurate throwing arm. The outfielder was the recipient of a litany of awards and won batting titles in two minor leagues, including hitting .386 for the Midwest League title in 2011. The next year, he won the Texas League batting title and was the Texas League Player of the Year and Cardinals organization Player of the Year.

On May 31, 2014, Taveras homered in his major league debut against the San Francisco Giants and went on to hit .239 in 80 regular season games, playing mostly right field. He also hit a game-tying home run in Game 2 of the 2014 National League Championship Series against the Giants. On October 26, 2014, he died in a car accident in the Dominican Republic shortly after the Cardinals were eliminated from the playoffs.

== Early life ==
Originally from Puerto Plata, Dominican Republic, Oscar Taveras grew up in a town called Sosúa. He began taking interest in baseball early in life. According to his father, Francisco Taveras, at about age five, he started to call himself "El Fenómeno," which is Spanish for "The Phenomenon". "He would say, 'I'm going to make you the happiest dad in the world. I want to be a star. I want to be a major leaguer. I'm the phenomenon. I'm the best,'" recounted his father.

Taveras' father was an outfielder in the Milwaukee Brewers' minor league system. Taveras lived in Montreal from ages 12 to 16 and obtained Canadian citizenship. Afterwards, he returned to the Dominican Republic; had he stayed in Canada, he would have entered the draft after high school.

== Professional career ==
=== Minor leagues ===
==== DSL Cardinals, Johnson City, and Quad Cities (2009–11) ====
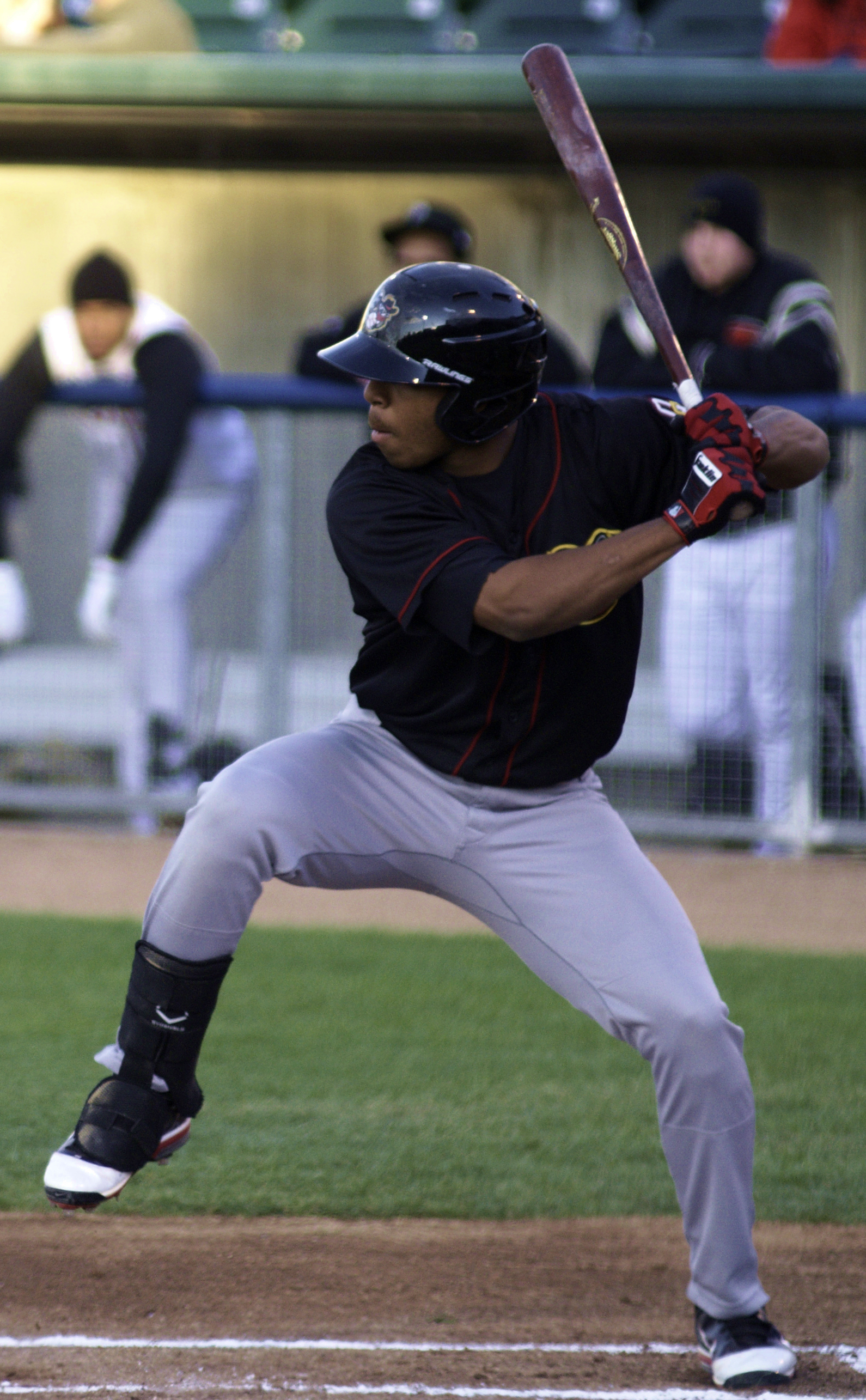
Taveras batting for the Quad Cities River Bandits in 2011

The St. Louis Cardinals signed Taveras as an international amateur free agent on November 25, 2008 for $145,000. They assigned him to the rookie league Dominican Summer League Cardinals the next season. Although he hit just .265 with one home run (HR) and 42 runs batted in (RBI) in 65 games, Taveras earned a promotion to the Johnson City Cardinals of the Rookie-level Appalachian League in 2010. The talent which scouts had discovered in the Dominican Republic quickly actualized, as he hit .322 with eight HR and 43 RBI in 53 games.

Taveras earned another promotion to the Quad Cities River Bandits of the Class A Midwest League (MWL) in 2011 and spent the entire season there. From May 11 to June 11, he was out of action due to a hamstring injury. Despite missing a full month, his hitting continued to improve by obtaining 33 multi-hit games, 17 three-hit contests and five four-hit games. Further, he earned two MWL Player of the Week (PoW) awards. The first was for the week of July 17, after batting .600 (15 hits in 25 at bats) with five multi-hit games, 10 runs scored and five RBI.

The second PoW award Taveras earned with the River Bandits was for the week ending August 28. He batted .581 (18–31) with another five multi-hit games, two home runs and 11 RBI. That week, he also achieved three three-hit games and two four-hit games. After coming off the bench in the August 28 game against Burlington, he went 3-for-3 with a home run and missed hitting for the cycle by a double. For the season, Taveras batted .386 with a .444 on-base percentage (OBP), .584 slugging percentage (SLG), eight HR and 62 RBI in 78 games. He earned the Midwest League batting title with the highest average in the league since 1956. He was actually 31 plate appearances short of qualifying; however, his adjusted batting average after adding the hitless at-bats still gave him the title. He was the first Cardinals minor leaguer to win the MWL batting title since Brendan Ryan in 2004.

==== Springfield and Memphis (2012–2014) ====
After winning the Midwest League batting title at age 19, Taveras began to garner notice outside the Cardinals organization. Baseball America named him the Cardinals' third-best prospect prior to the 2012 season and ranked him 74th in all of baseball. The Cardinals assigned him to play for the Springfield Cardinals of the Class AA Texas League. He spent the entire season there, playing 124 games before participating in winter league play.

Taveras won his first of two Cardinals Minor League Player of the Month awards in 2012 for April after batting .340 (32–94) with six HR and 21 RBI. On June 4, he achieved his first career five-hit game against Corpus Christi with four runs scored. He earned PoW honors for the week ending June 10 – which included the five-hit game – after batting .500 (14–28) with two home runs, four RBI and 11 runs scored. Taveras won his second organizational Player of the Month award of 2012 – and third of his career – for June after totaling a .347 average (34–98), six HR and 19 RBI. Beginning June 8, he amassed a 12-game hitting streak.

Selected to the Texas League All-Star team, Taveras started in center field and batted fourth. His 3-for-4, home run, double and two-RBI effort helped earn him unanimous Most Valuable Player honors for the game. He also played in the Major League Baseball All-Star Futures Game for the World squad. He started in right field and batted third, collecting one hit in three at-bats. He ended the season with a 22-game on-base streak that spanned from August 4 to September 3. Taveras logged 43 multi-hit games, including 12 three-hit games, five four-hit games and one five-hit game. In his 124 total games, he played 93 in center field, 15 in right and one in left. He hit safely in 94 games and reached base in 107. He batted .346 (47 of 136) with eight HR and 72 RBI with runners in scoring position (RISP) and .321 with RISP and two outs, including 17 RBI. He also hit .372 (73 of 196) with 12 HR and 49 RBI in the sixth inning and later.

Taveras' season totals for 2012 included 23 HR, 94 RBI and a league-leading .321 batting average, his second minor league batting title. In addition, he led the Texas League in extra base hits (67), doubles (37), total bases (273) and intentional walks (10). He ranked second in hits (153), RBI and slugging percentage (.572), and tied for fourth both in home runs and triples (7). In nine playoff games, he hit .235 with four doubles and two RBI as Springfield won the Texas League championship. Baseball America conferred the club with their Minor League Team of the Year award. Taveras was named the Texas League Player of the Year.

Further, Taveras led all Cardinals minor leaguers in hits, doubles, triples, home runs, RBI, SLG and on-base plus slugging (.953), while also finishing in the top five in batting average and runs. He was named the Cardinals' Minor League Player of the Year. He played another 39 games in the after-season Dominican Professional Baseball League for the Águilas Cibaeñas. He won the league Rookie of the Year award after batting .316 with five home runs and 17 RBI as the Águilas clinched the league's best record. In a skills ("Best Tools") survey, Baseball America found Taveras the "Best Hitter for Average".

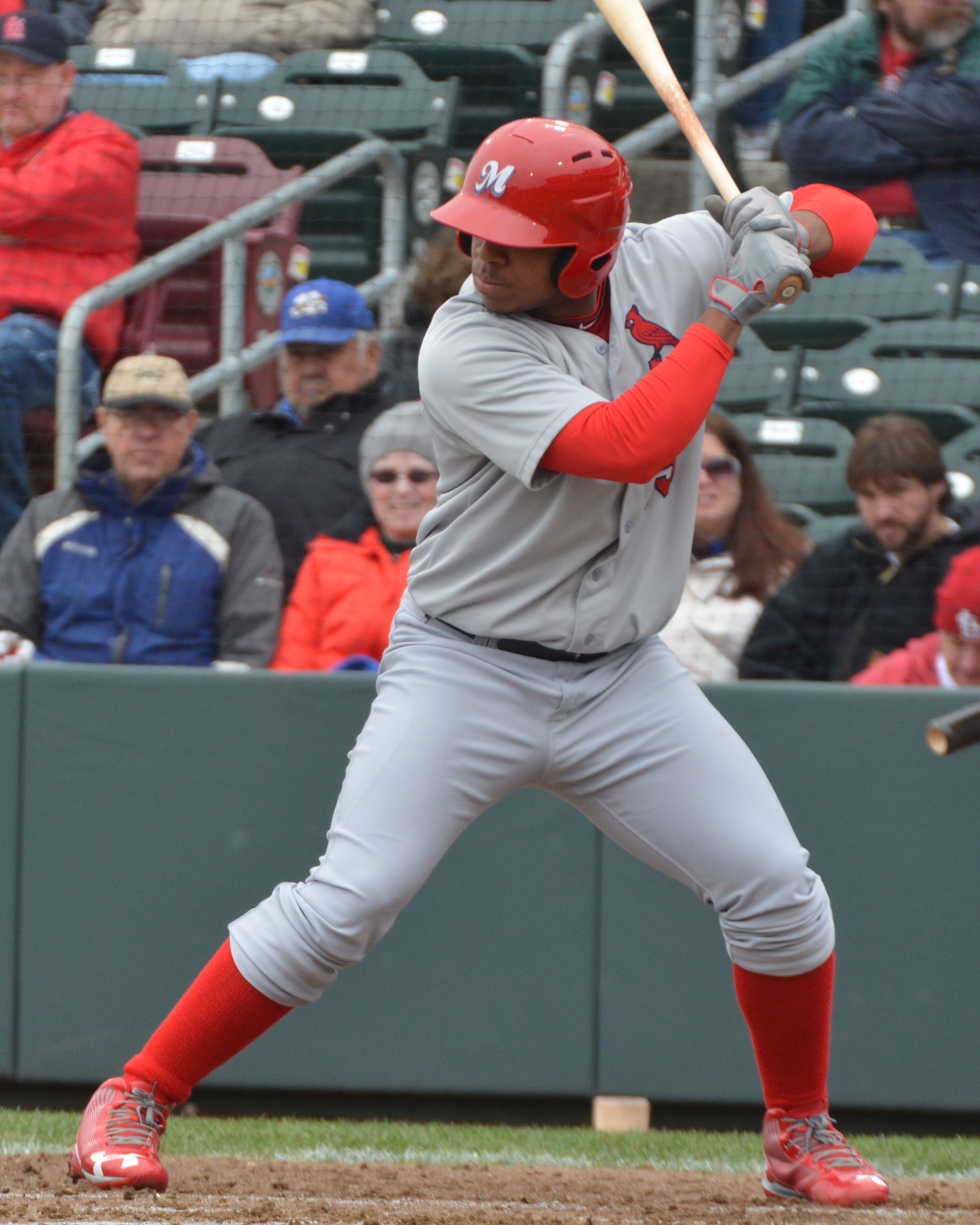
Taveras batting for the Memphis Redbirds in 2013

Entering the 2013 season, Baseball America ranked Taveras as the Cardinals' best prospect and the third-best prospect in all of baseball. MLB.com also ranked Taveras as the Cardinals' number-one prospect, and the number-three prospect in its Top 50 Prospects. Prior to the 2013 World Baseball Classic, Taveras' agent was approached about him playing for the Canadian national baseball team. The Cardinals promoted him to the Triple-A Memphis Redbirds of the Pacific Coast League.

In each game from May 6–10, Taveras collected at least one RBI. He batted .362 with 17 hits in 47 at bats for the month of May. However, injury obstructed his in-game action. While sliding into second base in a May 12 game, his ankle caught and pronated awkwardly on the bag, resulting in a high-ankle sprain. He played in just 15 games after that for the season and in 46 total. Surgery to correct the sprain, performed by Dr. Robert Anderson, ended his season in August.

For the season, Taveras rendered a .306 batting average with 12 doubles, five home runs and 32 RBI. It was the fourth consecutive season in which he batted at least .300. Especially productive against right-handed pitching, he forged a .366 batting average (37-for-101) with four HR and 24 RBI. Further, he generated three four-hit games and 15 multi-hit games while hitting safely in 31 overall. In 18 games, he provided at least one RBI, and in nine, recorded multiple runners driven in. In Baseball America's "Best Tools" survey, he was rated the "Best Hitter for Average" in the Cardinals organization. The Cardinals added Taveras to their 40-man roster on November 20, 2013.

=== St. Louis Cardinals (2014) ===
Beginning in the 2014 season, MLB.com ranked Taveras as the second-best prospect in all of MLB, behind only Byron Buxton of the Minnesota Twins organization. The Cardinals invited him to spring training. Although team officials believed that his ankle had fully healed in time for 2014 spring training, he hesitated to fully trust the ankle in performance. A hamstring injury followed, limiting him to just six at-bats. The Cardinals optioned him to minor league camp on March 14.

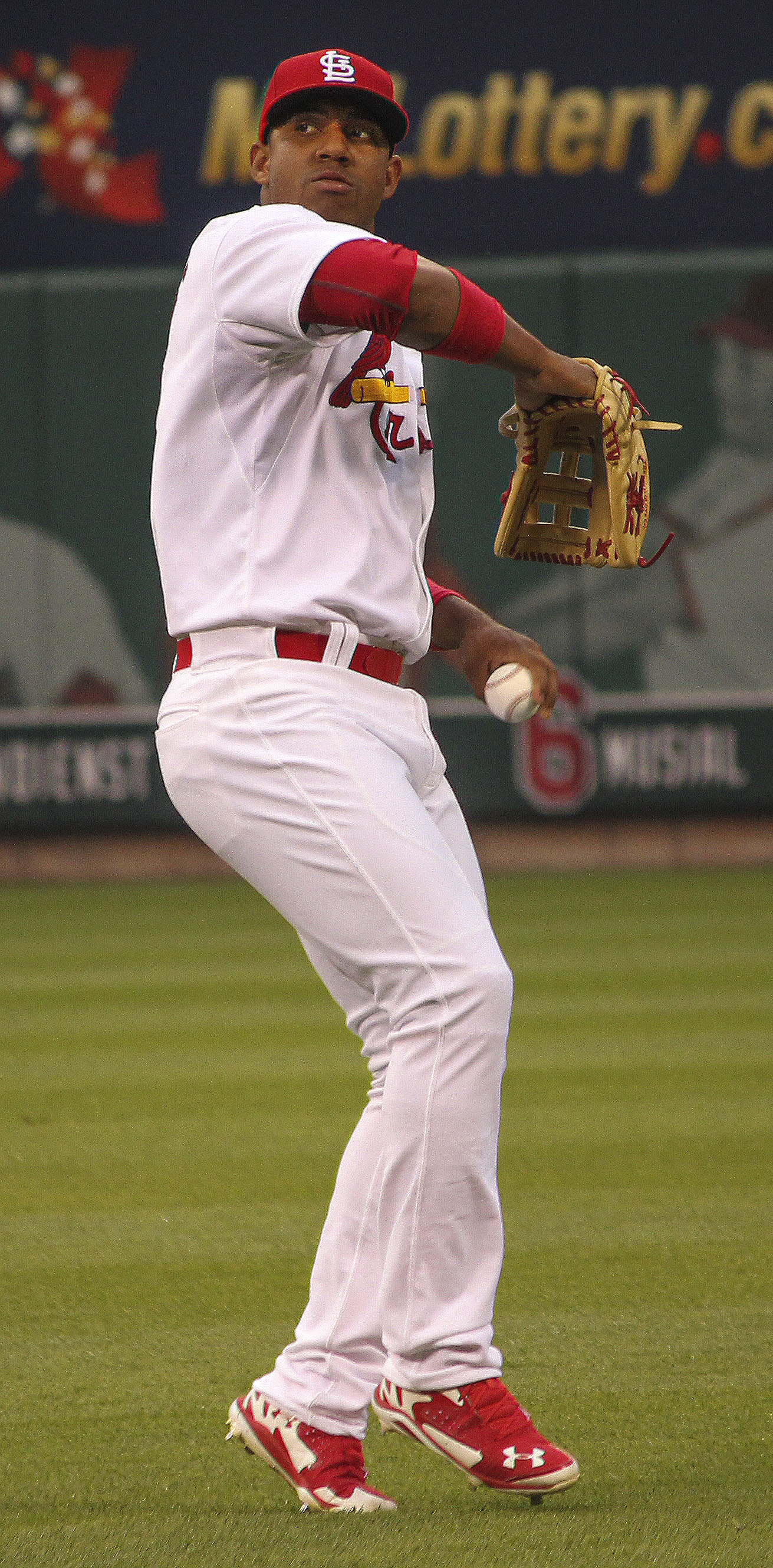
Taveras playing for the St. Louis Cardinals in 2014

On May 30, 2014, the Cardinals called Taveras up to their MLB roster in one of the most anticipated promotions in all MLB. He became the first from Sosúa to reach the major leagues. At that point, he had been batting .325 with a .373 OBP and a .524 SLG at Memphis. Other totals included seven HR and 40 RBI in 49 games and 191 at-bats. Taveras was held hitless in consecutive games just once. In his last 10 games, he collected hits in all but one, batting .462. During those same 10 games, he fashioned two three-hit games and one four-hit outing. In 209 plate appearances, he walked just 14 times, but also struck out just 25 for a 12.1% strikeout rate.

Making his MLB debut at Busch Stadium on the afternoon of Saturday, May 31, against the San Francisco Giants, Taveras flied out in his first at-bat. However, he launched his first hit and home run, which traveled 418 feet (127 m), in his next at-bat. It occurred with one out in the bottom of the fifth inning against starting pitcher Yusmeiro Petit. He became the youngest to hit a home run in his major league debut for the Cardinals since Eddie Morgan in 1936. It also started to rain, immediately forcing a 47-minute delay. The home run proved to be the game-winning run as the Cardinals won, 2–0.

Taveras hit his first MLB single the next day, June 1. When Matt Adams came off the DL June 19, Taveras' 22nd birthday, the Cardinals optioned him back to Memphis after batting .189 with a .225 OBP and .297 SLG in 40 PA. Despite the low rate statistics, he showed a marked ability to get contact on MLB pitching. His contact rate of 92.3% on pitches outside of the strike zone surpassed the MLB average of 65.7% for all non-pitchers. His miss rate of 2.5% on swinging strikes was significantly lower than the MLB average of 9.1%.

One month after his first call-up, the Cardinals recalled Taveras on June 30. He was batting .318 with a .502 SLG at Memphis. To allow him more playing opportunities, the Cardinals traded slumping incumbent right fielder Allen Craig to the Boston Red Sox on the July 31 non-waiver trade deadline. His first career three-hit game was on September 7 against the Milwaukee Brewers. That series, he played three of the four games, collecting five hits in eight at-bats with a home run and four RBI. It was one of eight multi-hit games on the year. Taveras finished the 2014 season with a batting average of .239 in 80 major league games. He appeared on the postseason roster for the Cardinals, playing exclusively as a pinch hitter, and collected three hits and two runs scored in seven total at bats. His postseason debut was in the National League Division Series against the Los Angeles Dodgers. One hit was a home run that tied the score in Game 2 of the National League Championship Series against the Giants, the only game the Cardinals won in the series; as it turned out, it was the final hit in his career. His final tweet was "Thanks for all the fan support!" on October 13.

== Skills profile ==
Regarded as a left-handed hitting version of Vladimir Guerrero (also a native of the Dominican Republic), one of Taveras' prized skills was an ability that few possess to square the bat on—and effectively hit—pitches that are out of the strike zone, much as the case was with Guerrero. Because of his bat speed and the wide range of pitch locations of which he could hit, Taveras successfully unraveled what are termed as "pitcher's pitches", which helped contribute to his high batting average. An aggressive hitter, Taveras maintained control with his smooth swing.

With a wide batting stance and slight leg kick that "allows him to maintain both incredible balance and timing", he shifted his weight on his left (back) leg "before connecting with the ball with an explosive, quick swing." His combination of strong, quick hands and excellent hand-eye coordination allowed him to assert considerable bat control to make constant, square contact with the incoming pitch. With an ability to drive the ball to all fields, his power ceiling was high, projected with 25 to 30 home runs in his peak. His preparation also received high marks. Through 2013, Taveras' career minor league batting average was .320 with 45 home runs and 275 RBIs in 374 games.

Although Taveras' defensive skills were not as prodigious as his hitting abilities, he ran routes well and had solid instincts. Earlier in his professional career, he gained a reputation for concentrating too heavily on hitting at the expense of his fielding. However, Taveras worked to increase his abilities in the outfield. With a strong throwing arm, his defensive skills projected him to be a corner outfielder, particularly in right field. However, the Cardinals believed that Taveras showed the range and skill to be an effective center fielder so he began taking an apprenticeship to learn the position.

== Death ==
On October 26, 2014, Taveras and his girlfriend, Edilia Arvelo, died in a car accident on the Sosúa-Cabarete freeway in Puerto Plata, Dominican Republic. His new red 2014 Chevrolet Camaro had gone off the road at high speed, hitting a tree.

Taveras suffered multiple injuries and was pronounced dead at Sosúa Cabarete Medical Center. Arvelo suffered injuries to the head and to the chest. The accident occurred at 7:40 PM ET, just before the start of Game 5 of the 2014 World Series. Cardinals chairman William DeWitt, Jr. issued the following statement:

We are all stunned and deeply saddened by the tragic loss of one of the youngest members of the Cardinals family. Oscar was an amazing talent with a bright future who was taken from us well before his time. Our thoughts and prayers are with his family and friends tonight.

Cardinals general manager John Mozeliak made a statement, saying:

I simply can’t believe it. I first met Oscar when he was 16 years old and will forever remember him as a wonderful young man who was a gifted athlete with an infectious love for life who lived every day to the fullest.

Cardinals manager Mike Matheny stated, "There is not a more accurate word ("love") for how a group of men share a deep and genuine concern for each other. We loved Oscar, and he loved us. That is what a team does. That is what a family does." Commissioner of Baseball Bud Selig stated, "With heavy hearts, tonight we play Game 5 of the 2014 World Series in the memory of these two young people."

=== Aftermath and legacy ===
Observances on behalf of Arvelo and Taveras and a moment of silence were held before Game 6 of the World Series, before the first pitch. Kansas City Royals starting pitcher Yordano Ventura wrote "R.I.P. O.T #18" on his hat along with other tributes on his cleats and glove. His hat was turned in for display at the National Baseball Hall of Fame and Museum. (Ventura himself died in a car crash in the Dominican Republic less than three years later.) On October 28, the Cardinals left the right field lights on at Busch Stadium and released a Twitter photo of the scene the next day.

More than an estimated 5,000 gathered for Taveras's funeral in Sosúa, including around 40 who gathered on the rooftop of a cemetery church. Many of the mourners wore jerseys with "El Fenómeno" printed on their backs. "He was like Superman here. He was here to uplift kids and put the town on the map. He was the hope," said teammate Carlos Martínez. Martínez requested to change his uniform number from 44 to 18 (Taveras's number) to honor him in part because they were also friends. The team granted his request. Taveras had left behind a one-year-old son, Oscar Yadier Taveras.

Questions arose as to whether he was intoxicated in that fatal crash on the Sosúa-Cabarete freeway. On November 11, press releases confirmed that his blood alcohol content was 0.287, nearly six times the legal limit for the Dominican Republic. After the second alcohol-related fatality to a Cardinals player in a decade, following that of Josh Hancock in 2007, John Mozeliak lamented the circumstances of the player's death. He declared that the team would take a greater role in educating young players to "avoid reckless actions".

In January 2015, DeWitt announced plans for the Cardinals to renovate a baseball field in Sosúa in Taveras's honor, modeled after the Cardinals Care facilities in Greater St. Louis. The team would also wear black circular patches inscribed with OT (Taveras's initials) inside a white circle on their jerseys. The patch omitted Taveras's No. 18 because Carlos Martínez wore it as his uniform number as a tribute. A large decal in his memorial was posted in the home team bullpen of Busch Stadium along with the ones of Hancock and former pitcher Darryl Kile, who died of coronary artery disease during the 2002 season while still active.

== Awards ==
Award/honor	# of times	Dates (Ranking or event)	Refs
Minor leagues
Major League Baseball All-Star Futures Game	2	2012, 2013	
Minor leagues All-Star	3	2010 (Appalachian League), 2012 midseason and postseason (Texas League)	
Minor leagues All-Star game MVP	1	2012 midseason (Texas League)	
Baseball America's Top 100 minor league prospects	3	pre-2012 (#74), pre-2013 (#2), pre-2014 (#3)	
MLB.com's Top 50 minor league prospects	2	pre-2013 (#3), pre-2014 (#2)	
Baseball Prospectus' Top minor league prospects	3	pre-2012 (#23), pre-2013 (#3), pre-2014 (#3)	
Baseball America's Cardinals' top prospect	1	pre-2013	
Cardinals organization Player of the Year	1	2012	
Cardinals Minor League Player of the Year	1	2012	
Cardinals organization Player of the Month	3	July 2011, April 2012, June 2012	
Texas League Player of the Year	1	2012	
Texas League top prospects	1	2012 (#2)	
Texas League "Most Exciting Player"	1	2012	
Texas League "Best Batting Prospect"	1	2012	
Midwest League Player of the Week	2	July 11–17, 2011 and August 22–28, 2011	
Baseball America Minor league All-Star	1	2012	
Topps Texas League Player of the Year	1	2012	
Topps Double-A All-Star	1	2012	
The Cardinal Nation/Scout.com Top Prospect	4	2011 (#11), 2012 (#3), 2013 (#1), 2014 (#1)	

== See also ==
- List of baseball players who died during their careers
- List of people from the Dominican Republic
