= Matt Adams =

American baseball player (born 1988)

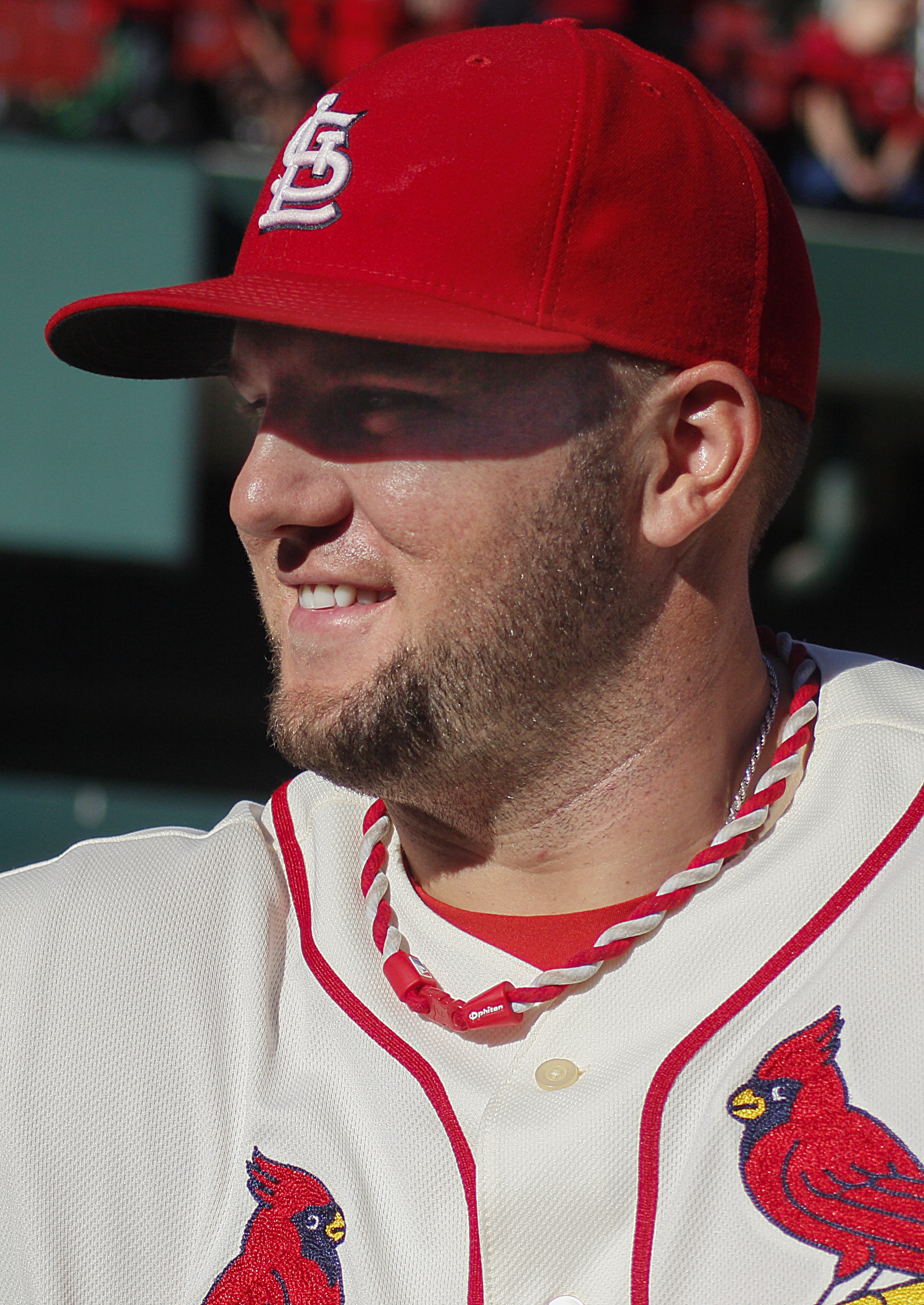
- Adams with the St. Louis Cardinals
- First baseman
- Born: August 31, 1988 (age 38); Philipsburg, Pennsylvania, U.S.
- Batted: Left Threw: Right

MLB debut
- May 20, 2012, for the St. Louis Cardinals

Last MLB appearance
- July 24, 2021, for the Colorado Rockies

MLB statistics
- Batting average: .258
- Home runs: 118
- Runs batted in: 399
- Stats at Baseball Reference

Teams
- St. Louis Cardinals (2012–2017); Atlanta Braves (2017); Washington Nationals (2018); St. Louis Cardinals (2018); Washington Nationals (2019); Atlanta Braves (2020); Colorado Rockies (2021)

Career highlights and awards
- World Series champion (2019)

Matthew James Adams (born August 31, 1988) is an American former professional baseball first baseman. Nicknamed Big City for his imposing size and ability to regularly hit long home runs, the St. Louis Cardinals selected Adams in the 23rd round of the 2009 MLB draft from Slippery Rock University of Pennsylvania. He played in Major League Baseball (MLB) for the Cardinals, Atlanta Braves, Washington Nationals, and Colorado Rockies.

Playing in the Texas League in 2011, Adams was recognized as that league's Most Valuable Player and the Cardinals Minor League Player of the Year with a .300 batting average, 32 home runs and 101 runs batted in. He made his Major League Baseball (MLB) debut with the St. Louis Cardinals in 2012. In his rookie season in 2013, Adams hit 17 home runs in 296 at-bats. He won the 2019 World Series with the Washington Nationals.

== Early life ==
Adams grew up in Philipsburg, Centre County, Pennsylvania. After graduating from Philipsburg-Osceola High School he attended Slippery Rock University where he holds the career records of batting average (.473) and slugging percentage (.754). In 2009, he was named the National Collegiate Baseball Writers Association's Division II National Player of the Year.

== Professional career ==
=== St. Louis Cardinals ===
==== Minor leagues ====
The St. Louis Cardinals drafted Matt Adams in the 23rd round of the 2009 Major League Baseball draft. At each level he played in the minor leagues, Adams displayed prodigious hitting ability. His first full-season assignment came in 2010 with the Quad Cities River Bandits of the Single–A Midwest League. In 121 games, he batted .310 with 71 runs scored, 44 doubles, 22 home runs (HR), and 88 runs batted in (RBI). His .541 slugging percentage (SLG) led all Cardinals minor leaguers.

In 2011, Adams was named the Cardinals Minor League Player of the Year and the Texas League Most Valuable Player (MVP) after hitting .300, a .357 on-base percentage (OBP) and .566 SLG with 32 HR and 101 RBI in 115 games. He set club records in home runs and RBI, including eclipsing the mark of 29 HR Colby Rasmus set in 2007. After the season, Adams played in the Arizona Fall League (AFL), and he was selected to represent the Cardinals in the AFL Rising Stars Game.

==== 2012 ====
Prior to the 2012 season, Baseball America considered him the ninth best prospect in the Cardinals organization. On May 20, 2012, the Cardinals called Adams up after placing Lance Berkman on the disabled list (DL). He went 2-for-4 in his major league debut. He hit his first major league home run six days later. Adams played in 27 games with the Cardinals where he hit .244 with 13 RBI and two home runs before returning to Memphis.

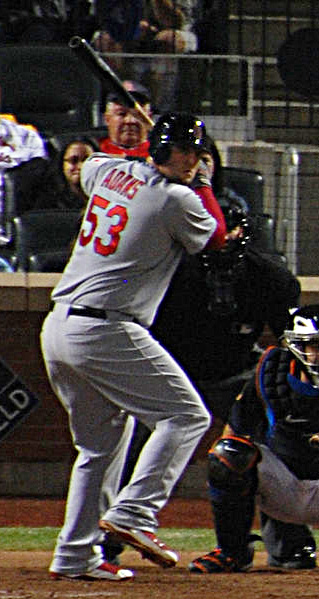
Adams batting against the Mets

Splitting time between the Memphis Redbirds of the Triple–A Pacific Coast League and the Cardinals, he continued to show consistent power and batting average in the minor leagues. At Memphis, Adams hit 18 home runs with 50 RBI as he batted .329 with a .624 slugging percentage. However, an elbow injury brought an early end to his 2012 season. The injury, which had been a nagging problem much of summer, finally had to be treated surgically in mid-August to remove a bone spur.

==== 2013 ====
Adams led the Cardinals in 2013 spring training with 17 RBI. It was at that point that Adams earned his nickname, "Big City." According to former teammate David Freese, several players had been searching for a nickname for the 6 ft 3 inch 230-pounder, when one day someone shouted out "Big City". Said Freese: "Well he's a big boy that can rake [the ball]. I guess it hit because the guy can flat-out hit." Adams started off the regular season on the St. Louis Cardinals roster as a bench player, backing up first baseman Allen Craig. He caught the attention of the fans and media early on when in his first ten plate appearances he hit three home runs, two doubles, three singles, and a walk. For a significant part of April, his batting average hovered between .640 and .700.

With a right oblique strain, the Cardinals placed Adams on the 15-day disabled list on April 26, retroactive to April 22. As the season progressed, teams began to notice his pull-hitting tendencies and often employed an extreme infield shift on him that left one or no fielders on the left side of the second base bag. He also had difficulty hitting off-speed pitches from left-handed pitchers. Because he often grounded out to the right side of the bag, his batting average began to precipitously decline. In June, he batted just .179 and .205 in August.

At the conclusion of his rookie season, Adams finished with a .284 batting average and .503 SLG. He connected for 17 HR in 296 AB for a ratio of one home run every 17.41 at bats. That represented the third-best figure for rookies in franchise history. His home run to fly ball ratio was 21.8%, ranking 11th in the major leagues for all players with at least 300 PA. Regular right fielder Carlos Beltrán became a free agent after the season. Craig shifted to right field to replace him, clearing a way for Adams to assume first base regularly.

==== 2014 ====
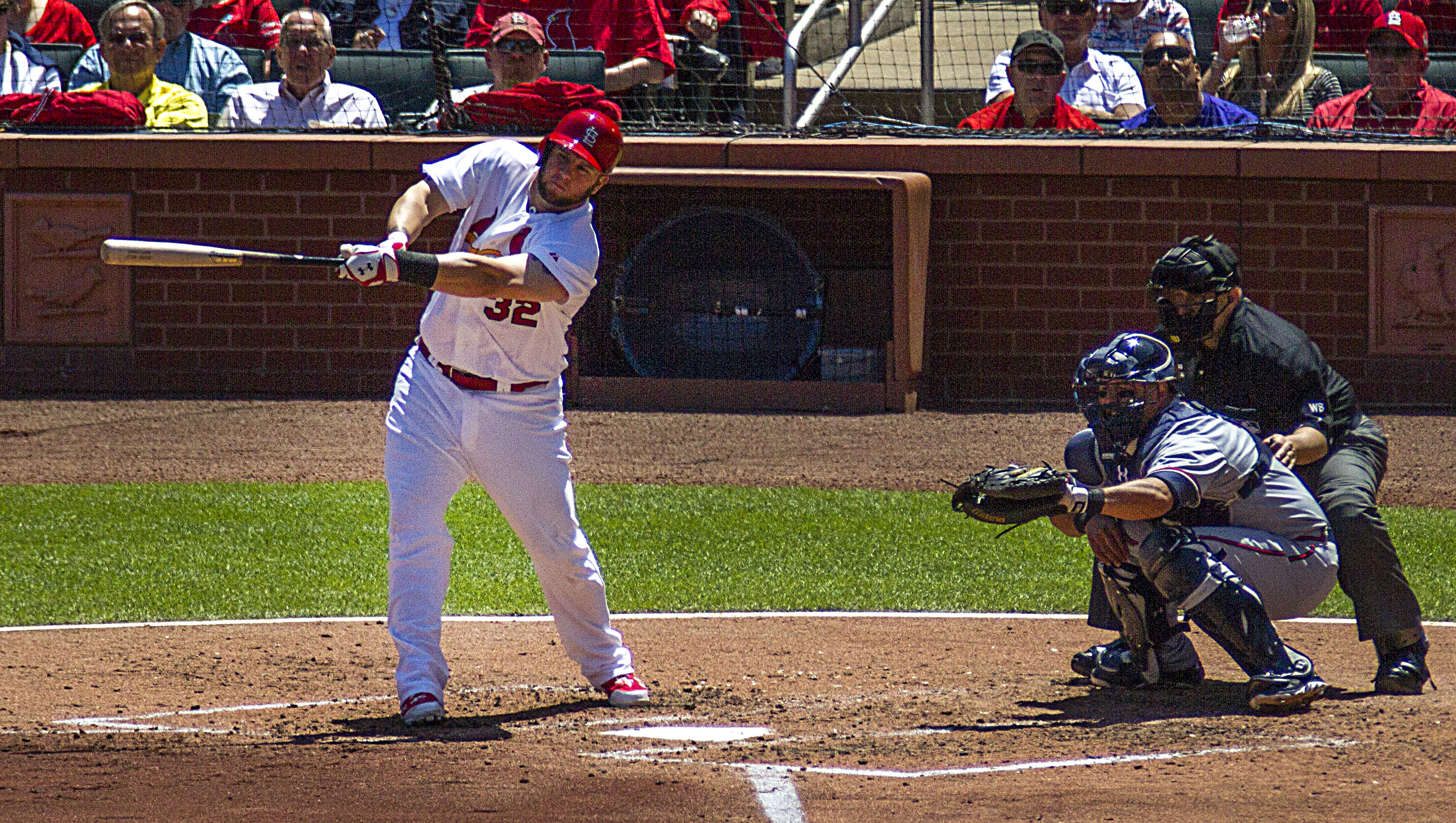
Adams batting against Atlanta, 2014

During a game against the Cincinnati Reds on April 3, 2014, in Cincinnati, Adams was attempting to catch a Chris Heisey pop-up that sailed into the shallow part of the seats. The infield tarp was in Adams' run path. As he leaned over the tarp to catch the ball, it was falling toward the second row of seats, and a fan named Chris Smith caught the ball with his own glove just above Adams' outstretch glove. Adams shifted his momentum to stand back up behind the tarp, and planted his glove on Smith's chest, pushing himself backward with a moderate shove. Smith, who had been recovering from knee surgery, gestured an obscenity with his hand toward him. During post-game interviews, Adams stated that he did not realize he had shoved Smith, but that he was preventing himself from falling into the stands.

Opponents escalated the rate of infield shifting the employed against Adams in 2014, as it was already a league-wide trend. To foil the shift, he began to hit the ball more to left field (also a technique known as "taking the pitch the other way") from the outset of the season. Another difference from the season prior was that he did not hit his first home run until the eleventh game of 2014, which took place against the Chicago Cubs. The results of his modified approach began to show, as he was batting .357 with a .400 OBP and .548 SLG through that game. Despite the drop-off in the power numbers, he continued to hit well against the shift. As of June 10, he was batting .390 (16 for 41) on ground balls and line drives against the shift with three home runs for the year. He also did it without successfully bunting for a base hit.

The team placed Adams on the DL for the second time in his MLB career from May–June. After his return, he homered in the first three games. His first multi-homer game of the season came against the Colorado Rockies on June 23 at Coors Field with two home runs and six RBI in an 8–0 victory. This was Adams' third MLB multi-home run game and first the six-RBI game for the Cardinals since David Freese did it June 7, 2012 against the Houston Astros. In a July 7 contest against the Pittsburgh Pirates, Adams hit the first walk-off home run in the regular season by a Cardinals batter since Skip Schumaker did so against the Kansas City Royals in 2011.

In Game 4 of the 2014 NLDS, Adams erased the Los Angeles Dodgers' 2–0 lead in the 7th inning with a three-run homer off ace Clayton Kershaw. The home run accounted for the winning runs in the Cardinals' 3–2 victory, helping to secure their fourth straight NLCS appearance.

==== 2015–2017 ====
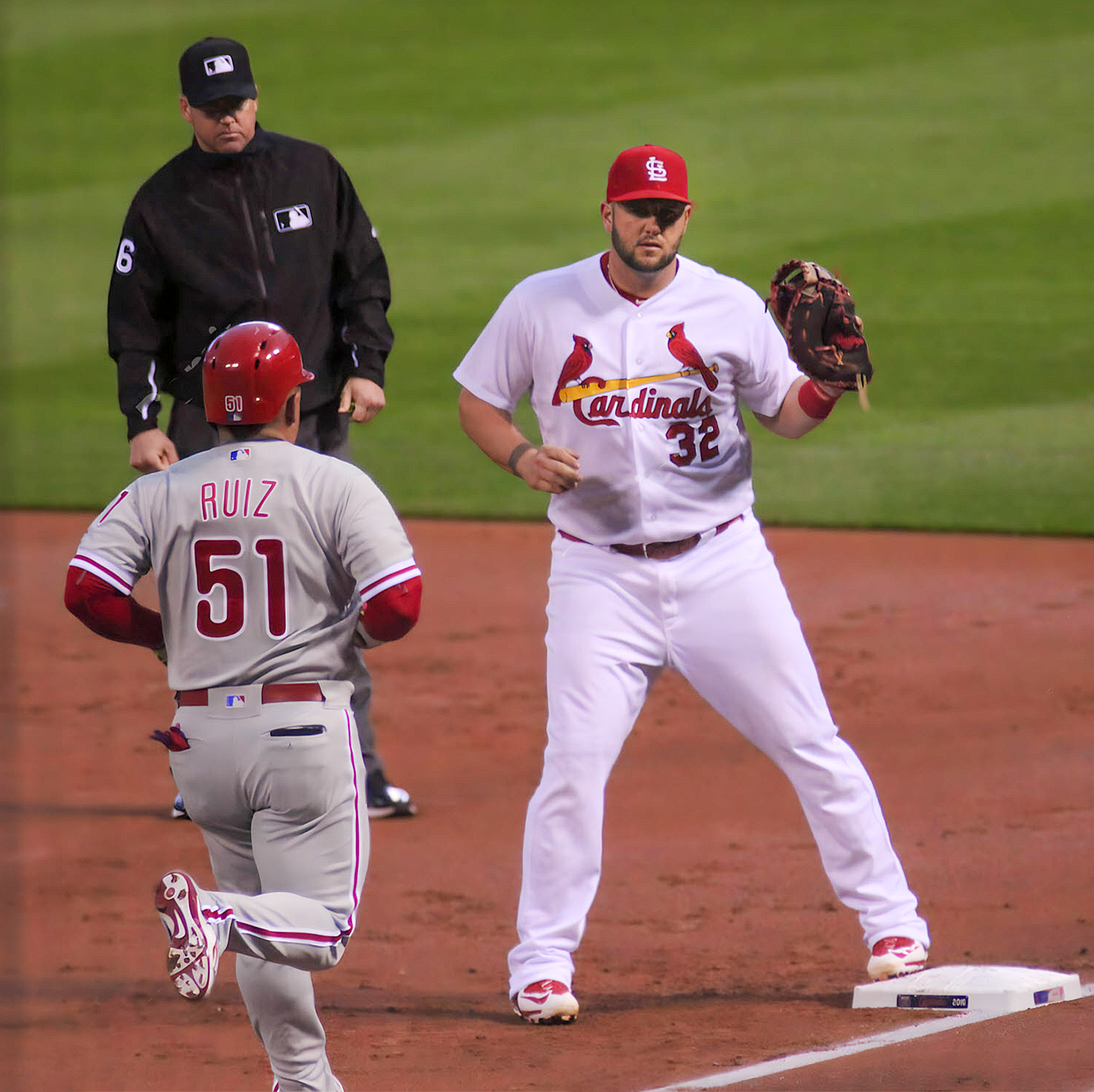
Matt Adams in 2016.

On May 27, 2015, the Cardinals placed Adams on the DL with a torn quadriceps muscle, and he was initially supposed to miss the remainder of the season. The Cardinals reactivated him on September 9. As an arbitration-eligible player prior to the 2016 season, Adams and the Cardinals agreed to a one-year, $1.65 million contract. He continued his success in foiling the shift through May 2016 by a slight modification to his swing, and as a result, successfully gaining hits to each of the three outfield zones over 30 percent of the time. He had hit .354, three home runs, 14 RBI and .604 SLG through the first 25 days of that month.

On July 22, 2016, while playing the Dodgers, Adams hit a 444 feet (135 m) home run in the 16th inning for walk-off, 4−3, win. It was the second time in his career he had hit a walk-off home run in the 16th inning.

=== Atlanta Braves ===
On May 20, 2017, the Cardinals traded Adams and cash considerations to the Atlanta Braves in exchange for minor league infielder Juan Yepez.

=== Washington Nationals ===
Adams signed a one-year contract with the Washington Nationals on December 22, 2017. On May 7, 2018, he homered twice versus the San Diego Padres, giving him his sixth and seventh in seven games, along with 13 RBI. He had hit 10 home runs through that point in the season. Before he was traded, with the Nationals in 2018 he batted .257/.332/.510 with 18 home runs and 48 RBIs.

=== St. Louis Cardinals (second stint) ===
On August 21, 2018, Adams was traded to the St. Louis Cardinals in exchange for cash considerations. With the Cardinals in 2018, he batted .158/.200/.333 in 57 at bats. Between the two teams in 2018, he batted .239/.309/.477 with 21 home runs and 57 RBIs in 306 at bats.

=== Washington Nationals (second stint) ===
On December 15, 2018, Adams agreed to a one-year, $4 million deal with the Washington Nationals. In 2019 he batted .226/.276/.465 with 20 home runs and 56 RBIs as the Nationals went on to win the 2019 World Series. The Nationals did not exercise a mutual option to bring Adams back for the 2020 season.

=== Atlanta Braves (second stint) ===
On January 31, 2020, Adams signed a minor league contract with the New York Mets. He elected to become a free agent on July 18.

On July 20, 2020, Adams signed a minor league contract with the Atlanta Braves organization. He was informed that he made the Braves' Opening Day roster on July 23. In 16 games for Atlanta, Adams batted .184/.216/.347 with two home runs and nine RBI. He was designated for assignment by the Braves on August 30, and released by the organization on September 3.

=== Colorado Rockies ===
On March 28, 2021, Adams signed a minor league contract with the Colorado Rockies organization. He began the year with the Triple–A Albuquerque Isotopes. On April 29, Adams was selected to the active roster. Adams hit .167/.250/.194 in 22 games for the Rockies before he was released on July 27.

=== Kansas City Monarchs ===
On April 21, 2022, Adams signed with the Kansas City Monarchs of the American Association of Professional Baseball. Adams played in 80 games for the Monarchs, slashing .248/.327/.554 with 27 home runs and 85 RBI. He was named an All-Star for the team in 2022. Adams was released by the Monarchs on August 25.

=== Washington Nationals (third stint) ===
On December 14, 2022, Adams signed a minor league deal with the Washington Nationals organization. He played in 102 games for the Triple–A Rochester Red Wings, batting .246/.296/.431 with 17 home runs and 53 RBI. Adams elected free agency following the season on November 6, 2023.

=== Toros de Tijuana ===
On January 29, 2024, Adams signed with the Toros de Tijuana of the Mexican League. In 62 games for Tijuana, he slashed .272/.309/.491 with 12 home runs and 53 RBI.

On September 15, 2024, Adams announced his retirement from baseball in an Instagram post. He signed a one-day contract with St. Louis to retire a Cardinal.

== Coaching career ==
On January 17, 2025, the San Diego Padres hired Adams to serve as the bench coach for their Triple-A affiliate, the El Paso Chihuahuas.

== Personal life ==
Adams and his wife, Kim, married in 2020. They reside in St. Louis during the offseason.

Prior to the 2017 season, Adams lost over thirty pounds.
