= Travis Ishikawa =

American baseball player and coach (born 1983)

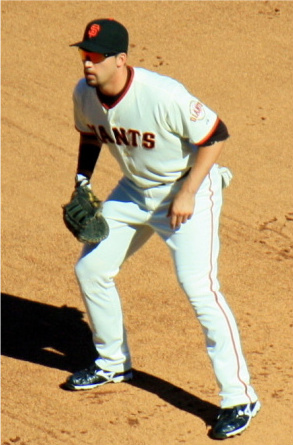
- Ishikawa with the Giants in 2009
- First baseman
- Born: September 24, 1983 (age 43); Seattle, Washington, U.S.
- Batted: Left Threw: Left

MLB debut
- April 18, 2006, for the San Francisco Giants

Last MLB appearance
- October 2, 2015, for the Pittsburgh Pirates

MLB statistics
- Batting average: .255
- Home runs: 23
- Runs batted in: 137
- Stats at Baseball Reference

Teams
- San Francisco Giants (2006, 2008–2010); Milwaukee Brewers (2012); Baltimore Orioles (2013); New York Yankees (2013); Pittsburgh Pirates (2014); San Francisco Giants (2014–2015); Pittsburgh Pirates (2015)

Career highlights and awards
- 2× World Series champion (2010, 2014)

Travis Takashi Ishikawa (born September 24, 1983) is an American former professional baseball first baseman and current minor league coach. He played for the San Francisco Giants, Milwaukee Brewers, Baltimore Orioles, New York Yankees, and Pittsburgh Pirates. Ishikawa has also filled in as an outfielder at times in his career.

Ishikawa grew up in Washington state. He was selected in the 21st round of the 2002 Major League Baseball draft by the San Francisco Giants out of high school and made his major league debut with the team in 2006. He started 2009 as the Giants' first baseman. On defense he was third in the National League in fielding percentage. In 2010, he earned a World Series ring as part of the Giants' World Series victory.

Ishikawa signed with the Milwaukee Brewers in 2012 and in 2014 made the Pittsburgh Pirates Opening Day roster. He was re-signed by his former team the Giants in April and started for them in left field during the 2014 playoffs. On October 16, 2014, Ishikawa hit a walk-off three-run home run to give the Giants their third National League pennant in five years by defeating the St. Louis Cardinals.

== Early life ==
Ishikawa attended Federal Way High School in Federal Way, Washington, where he lettered in baseball, leading his team to the Washington State Class 4A Title as a junior in 2001 and to the title game as a senior in 2002.

== Professional career ==
=== Draft and minor leagues ===
Ishikawa was drafted in the 21st round of the 2002 draft by the San Francisco Giants. The Giants gave him a $955,000 bonus to prevent him from attending Oregon State University. The bonus was at the time the highest for a non-first-round player, cued on by the organization's approaching signing deadline. The Giants could afford to pay a 21st-round pick that much because their higher picks had signed quickly for routine bonuses.

Ishikawa began his career playing for the rookie-league Arizona League Giants in 2002. He batted .279 with 10 runs scored, 19 hits, one home run and 10 Runs batted in (RBI) in 19 games (68 at-bats) before being called up to the Class A Short Season Salem-Keizer Volcanoes of the Northwest League. With Salem-Keizer, he hit .307 with 14 runs scored, 27 hits, one home run, and 17 RBI in 23 games (96 at-bats). His performance helped Salem-Keizer win the Northwest League championship.

In 2003, Ishikawa was initially assigned to the Class A Hagerstown Suns of the South Atlantic League. After he batted .206 with 20 runs scored, 40 hits, three home runs, and 22 RBI in 57 games (194 at-bats), he was demoted to Salem-Keizer. In 66 games (248 at-bats) with the Volcanoes, he batted .254 with 53 runs scored, 63 hits, three home runs, and 31 RBI.

Coming into 2004, Ishikawa was ranked the Giants' seventh-best prospect by Baseball America. He spent most of 2004 with the Suns, batting .257 with 59 runs scored, 92 hits, and 54 RBI in 97 games (355 at-bats). He tied with Nate Schierholtz for the team lead with 15 home runs, and he won the Hagerstown Player of the Month award in July. In the last month of the season, Ishikawa was promoted to the Class A-Advanced San Jose Giants of the California League, where he batted .232 with 10 runs scored, 13 hits, one home run, and 10 RBI in 16 games (56 at-bats). He also played eight playoff games for San Jose.

Ishikawa was ranked the 10th-best prospect in the Giants' organization by Baseball America entering 2005. In 2005, he spent the entire season with San Jose. In 127 games (432 at-bats), he batted .282 with 87 runs scored, 122 hits, and 79 RBI. His 22 home runs ranked fourth in the San Francisco Giants' organization and tied with Bryan LaHair, Travis Metcalf, and Aneudi Cuevas for seventh in the California League. He appeared in six playoff games, batting .217 with four RBI as San Jose won the California League championship.

Before the 2006 season, Baseball America ranked Ishikawa the number four prospect in the Giants' organization. He attended spring training with the Giants for the first time in his career.

=== San Francisco Giants (2006, 2008–2010) ===
==== 2006 ====
He was recalled from the minors for the first time on April 18 when Lance Niekro was placed on the Bereavement List, and made his major league debut the same day in a 7–4 loss to the Arizona Diamondbacks. His first big league hit came on April 19 as a pinch-hit single off Brandon Webb in a 10–3 loss to Arizona. The next day, he returned to the minors to make room for Niekro. On May 26, he was recalled when Daniel Ortmeier was sent to the minors. He had his first big league start that day against the Colorado Rockies and had three hits, two doubles and three RBI in a 9–0 victory. After the game, Kevin Frandsen and Todd Greene gave him a pie in the face to celebrate. After four games (during which he hit .500), he was returned to the minors on May 30. He was recalled on June 13 when Niekro went on the disabled list again. After six games on this stint, he returned to the minors on June 21 when Frandsen was recalled. In the minor leagues that year, Ishikawa played for the Double-A Connecticut Defenders of the Eastern League. In 86 games (298 at-bats), he batted .232 with 33 runs scored, 69 hits, 10 home runs, and 42 RBI. In 12 games (24 at-bats) with the Giants, he batted .292 with one run scored, seven hits, no home runs, and four RBI. After the season, he played for the Scottsdale Scorpions in the Arizona Fall League.

==== 2007 (minors) ====
Ishikawa attended spring training with the Giants in 2007 but was reassigned to the minors on March 6. He spent the entire season in the minors, splitting time between Connecticut and San Jose. He began the season with Connecticut, hitting .214 with three home runs and 17 RBI in 48 games (173 at-bats) before suffering a knee injury. He was sent to San Jose on June 28 to recover from it, and he said that the Giants told him he would be promoted to Triple-A after a rehab assignment. However, he struggled and remained with San Jose for the rest of the year, batting .268 with 13 home runs, 34 RBI, and a .551 slugging percentage in 56 games (198 at-bats). He batted .241, hit two home runs, and posted five RBI in the playoffs as San Jose won another California League championship.

==== 2008 ====
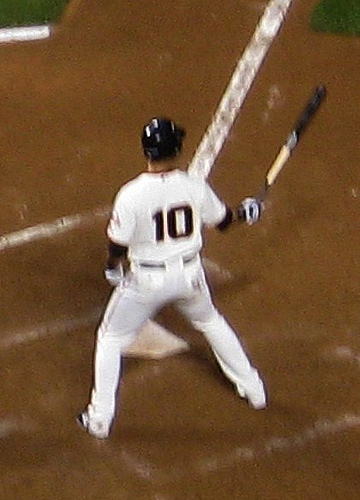
Ishikawa with the Giants

In 2008, Ishikawa again attended spring training for the Giants and again began the season in the minors. On August 13, he was called up by the Giants to replace a slumping John Bowker as the Giants' starting first baseman, a position Ishikawa held for most of the remainder of the season. Ishikawa hit his first major league home run on August 17 at Turner Field, a two-run shot off Charlie Morton to right field in a 3–1 victory over the Atlanta Braves. He set a career high by having three hits on September 12 and 14 against the San Diego Padres. In 33 games (95 at-bats) with the Giants, Ishikawa batted .274 with 12 runs, 26 hits, six doubles, three home runs, and 15 RBI.

Prior to his callup by the Giants, Ishikawa played for Connecticut and the Triple-A Fresno Grizzlies of the Pacific Coast League, batting .299 (121-for-405) with 69 runs, 35 doubles, 24 home runs, and 94 RBI in 112 games with both clubs. Initially, he was assigned to Connecticut, where he batted .289 with 16 doubles, 8 home runs, and 45 RBI in 64 games before earning a promotion to Fresno on June 20. In 48 games with Fresno, he batted .310 with 19 doubles, 16 home runs, and 46 RBI in 171 at-bats. He had the fourth-highest average, the second-most home runs, and the third-most RBI of players in the Giants' organization. In May and June, Ishikawa was awarded the Giants Player of Month title; from June 2 to 8 he was named the Eastern League Player of Week after amassing 10 hit in 22 at-bats (.455 average) with three home runs and nine RBI.

==== 2009 ====
Ishikawa retained the position of starting first baseman in 2009. In the first game of the season, Ishikawa had two hits, including a three-RBI triple in the first inning against Milwaukee Brewers' starting pitcher Jeff Suppan as the Giants won 10–6. From May 25 through July 11, Ishikawa had his best stretch of the year, batting .326 while hitting seven home runs and driving in 17 runs. He set a career high with four hits on May 25 and hit his first home run of the year, a three-run shot against Buddy Carlyle, in an 8–2 victory over Atlanta. On July 3, he hit a ball that was originally ruled a double against Felipe Paulino, but the umpires changed it to a three-run home run after watching the replay as the Giants won 13–0 over the Houston Astros. Ishikawa and Juan Uribe hit the Giants' first set of back-to-back home runs in 2009 against Josh Geer on July 9 in a 9–3 victory over the Padres. Through July 26, he batted .269 with seven home runs and 30 RBI. On July 27, the Giants traded for Ryan Garko from the Cleveland Indians, intending for him to replace Ishikawa at first base and provide more offense than Ishikawa had. However, Garko struggled to produce offensively, and at the end of August Ishikawa began making most of the starts at first for the rest of the year. On August 25, he snapped a 2–2 tie with a game-winning three-run eighth-inning home run against Jon Rauch as the Giants defeated Arizona 5–4. In 120 games (326 at-bats), Ishikawa batted .261 with 49 runs scored, 85 hits, 10 doubles, nine home runs, and 39 RBI. His batting average at AT&T Park was fifth in the National League (NL) for home stadiums at .349, but he batted .162 in away games. Defensively, his .996 fielding percentage was third in the NL behind Adam LaRoche's .999 and Todd Helton's .998.

==== 2010 ====
The Giants made Garko a free agent following the 2009 season, but they signed Aubrey Huff to play first base. As a result, Ishikawa spent most of 2010 pinch-hitting, backing up Huff, and entering as a defensive replacement at first base late in games. Ishikawa hit his first home run of the year on April 7, against Jeff Fulchino of the Astros in a 10–4 victory at Minute Maid Park. Huff began platooning in right field with Schierholtz (and later, with Andrés Torres) at the beginning of July, and Ishikawa got the starts at first base when Huff was in right field. On July 3, Ishikawa hit his first career grand slam against Ubaldo Jiménez (who had a 14–1 record at the time) in an 11–8 victory over Colorado. Ishikawa hit .290 with two home runs and 17 RBI in 36 games from July 1 through August 13, and he even saw his season batting average go over .300 at times during the stretch. However, the acquisition of José Guillén on August 13 moved Huff back to first base, which returned Ishikawa to a utility role. Giants' manager Bruce Bochy said, "[Ishikawa]'s done a nice job."

Ishikawa ended up hitting .266 with three home runs and 22 RBI in 116 games (158 at-bats) for the season. He batted .315 as a pinch-hitter, which ranked seventh in the NL. In a reverse from 2009, he batted .326 on the road while only hitting .194 at AT&T Park. The Giants won the NL West for the first time since 2003, and Ishikawa was on the Giants' active roster throughout their postseason run. He had a pinch-hit double against Mark Lowe in Game 1 of the World Series against the Texas Rangers as the Giants won 11–7. In Game 4, he got his first start of the postseason, playing first base in the Giants' 4–0 victory. He earned a World Series ring as the Giants defeated Texas in five games to win their first World Series since 1954.

==== 2011 ====
After the final game of spring training in 2011, Ishikawa was designated for assignment and outrighted to the minors to make room for rookie first baseman Brandon Belt. On April 24, Ishikawa hit a grand slam for Fresno against Kevin Mulvey in a 12–5 victory over the Reno Aces. He did not appear for the Giants in 2011, spending the season with the Grizzlies until he injured his shoulder diving for a ball early in the year and underwent season-ending shoulder surgery in the summer of 2011. In 56 games (175 at-bats) for the Grizzlies, Ishikawa batted .251 with 21 runs scored, 44 hits, 14 doubles, three home runs, and 18 RBI. On November 2, the Giants made him a free agent.

=== Milwaukee Brewers (2012) ===
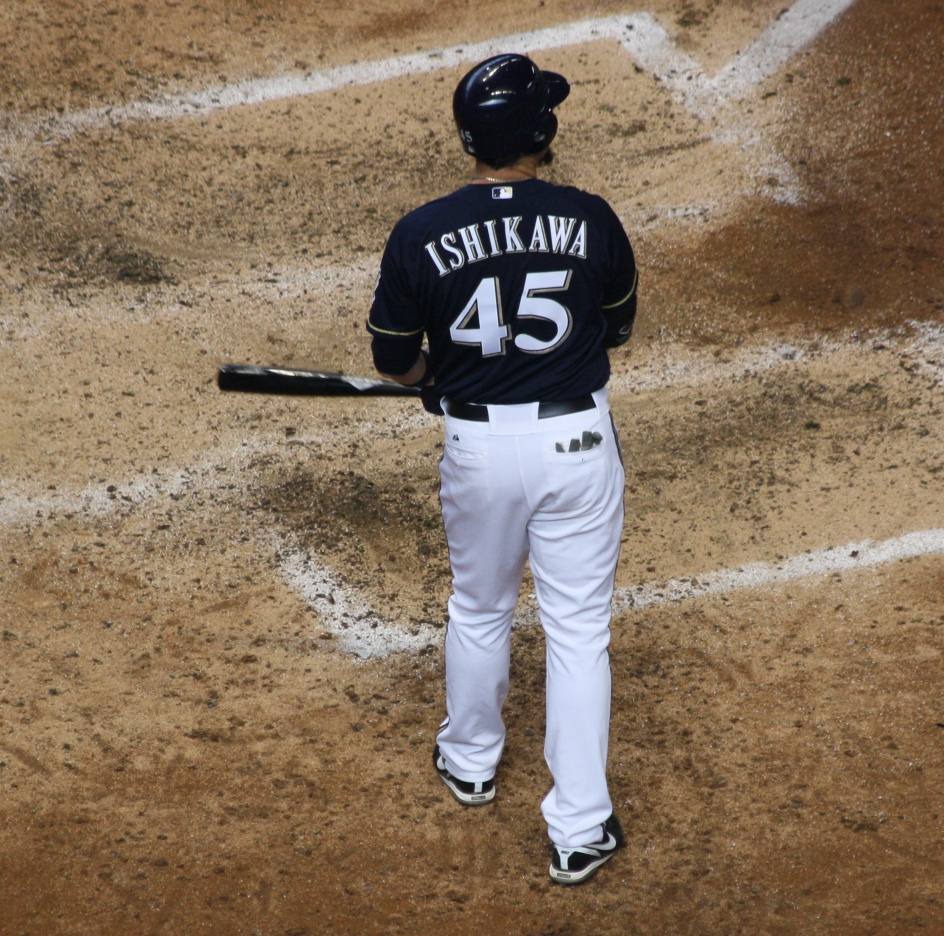
Ishikawa with the Brewers

Ishikawa signed a minor league contract with the Milwaukee Brewers on December 12, 2011, and made the team out of spring training as a backup first baseman and pinch hitter. On May 2, he became the starting first baseman for the Brewers after Mat Gamel tore his anterior cruciate ligament. He hit two home runs against Dillon Gee and had five RBI on May 15 in an 8–0 win over the New York Mets. He batted .250 with four home runs and 14 RBI in his first 32 games before going on the disabled list on May 27 with a left rib-cage strain. He returned from the disabled list on June 23, but by then Corey Hart had taken over the first base job, limiting Ishikawa to a reserve role for the rest of the year. On October 3, the final game of the season, Ishikawa had four RBI against Andrew Werner in a 7–6 loss to the Padres. In 94 games (152 at-bats), he hit .257 with four home runs and 30 RBI. On November 3, Ishikawa elected to become a free agent after being outrighted off the Brewers' 40-man roster the day before.

=== Baltimore Orioles (2013) ===
On December 19, 2012, Ishikawa signed a minor league contract with the Baltimore Orioles. He spent most of spring training with the team but was assigned to the Triple-A Norfolk Tides of the International League on March 27. In 49 games (177 at-bats) with Norfolk, he batted .316 with 56 hits, seven home runs, and 31 RBI. Ishikawa was brought up from the Tides on June 18 when pitcher Miguel González was placed on the paternity leave list; Ishikawa was called up to play designated hitter and give Chris Davis days off at first base. Ishikawa appeared in six games for the Orioles, getting two hits in 17 at-bats with 1 RBI. The Orioles designated him for assignment on June 29 to make room for Jair Jurrjens on the roster.

=== New York Yankees (2013) ===
Ishikawa was claimed off assignment waivers by the New York Yankees on July 7. He appeared in one game for the Yankees, starting at first base and going 0–2 with two strikeouts in a 5–1 loss to the Kansas City Royals. On July 14, Ishikawa cleared waivers and elected free agency after being designated for assignment when Derek Jeter returned from the 60-day disabled list.

=== Chicago White Sox ===
On July 18, 2013, Ishikawa signed a minor league deal with the Chicago White Sox and was assigned to the Charlotte Knights of the International League. In 34 games with the Knights (120 at-bats), he batted .250 with 30 hits, two home runs, and 23 RBI. His combined totals between Norfolk and Charlotte were a .290 batting average, 86 hits, nine home runs, and 54 RBI in 83 games (297 at-bats). Only able to see his family for 14 days between February and September, Ishikawa considered retirement.

=== Pittsburgh Pirates (2014) ===
After Ishikawa decided to play for one more season, the Pittsburgh Pirates signed him to a minor league contract. After prospect Andrew Lambo struggled in 2014 spring training, Ishikawa made the Pirates' roster. He started on Opening Day (March 31) and platooned at first base with Gaby Sánchez, with Ishikawa playing against right-hander and Sánchez playing against left-handers.

Ishikawa batted .206 with one home run in 15 games. The Pirates traded for Ike Davis on April 18 and designated Ishikawa for assignment on April 19. He became a minor league free agent on April 23.

=== Second stint with the Giants (2014–2015) ===
==== 2014 ====
Ishikawa signed a minor league deal with the Giants on April 24. After languishing in the minors for several months, Ishikawa again considered retirement, but the Giants promoted him to the major leagues on July 29 after ongoing injuries to first baseman Brandon Belt and a roster re-shuffle following a six-game losing streak. In late September, with the return of Belt to first base and ongoing injuries to outfielders Michael Morse and Ángel Pagán, the Giants asked Ishikawa to play left field for the first time in his career. Despite being a career first baseman and with just three career regular season starts in left field, Ishikawa became the Giants starting left fielder during the 2014 postseason.

In the 2014 National League Championship Series, Ishikawa batted 5-for-13 (.385) with 7 RBIs. He recorded the game-winning RBI in Game 1 and drove in three runs via a bases-loaded double in Game 3. In Game 5, with the Giants leading the series three games to one, Ishikawa hit a 3-run walk-off home run in the bottom of the ninth inning off of St. Louis Cardinals pitcher Michael Wacha to clinch the pennant for the Giants and their third World Series appearance in the past five seasons. Ishikawa's home run was the first to send a National League team to the World Series since Bobby Thomson's Shot Heard 'Round the World in 1951. When calling the home run, Giants radio broadcaster Jon Miller on KNBR radio yelled:

Good-bye, a home run for the game and for the pennant! The Giants have won the pennant!...Travis Ishikawa with the Bobby Thomson moment."

Ishikawa's home run was the first ever to end an NLCS and the fourth to end any LCS, after Chris Chambliss (1976 ALCS), Aaron Boone (2003 ALCS), and Magglio Ordóñez (2006 ALCS). Ishikawa earned his second World Series ring when the Giants defeated the Kansas City Royals four games to three.

==== 2015 ====
On December 4, 2014, Ishikawa and the Giants agreed to a one-year, $1.1 million contract for 2015. He started the 2015 season on the disabled list due to a back injury suffered near the end of spring training. At the conclusion of his rehab assignment, he was designated for assignment by the Giants and removed from the 40-man roster. Ishikawa subsequently cleared waivers and was sent to the Sacramento River Cats. On June 24, 2015, Ishikawa was called back up to the Giants to take the place of the injured Nori Aoki. He was designated for assignment again on July 3.

=== Second stint with the Pirates (2015) ===
Ishikawa was claimed off waivers by the Pirates on July 5, 2015. In 38 games with the Pirates, Ishikawa hit .224 with one home run and 8 RBI.

=== Chicago White Sox (2016) ===
In January 2016, Ishikawa was reportedly close to signing a minor-league contract with the Seattle Mariners, but the deal fell through. He signed a minor-league contract with the Chicago White Sox on February 9. He opened the 2016 season with the Triple-A Charlotte Knights. In 40 games for the Triple–A Charlotte Knights, he batted .201/.278/.344 with six home runs and 18 RBI. Ishikawa was released by the White Sox organization on May 24.

=== Third stint with the Giants (2016) ===
On June 8, 2016, Ishikawa signed a minor league contract to return to the San Francisco Giants organization. He played in 76 games for the Triple–A Sacramento River Cats, slashing .258/.344/.440 with 12 home runs and 55 RBI. Ishikawa elected free agency following the season on November 7.

== Post-playing career ==
On March 16, 2018, Ishikawa rejoined the Giants organization as a hitting coach for the Arizona League Giants "Orange" team, one of their two Arizona League teams.

On February 14, 2024, Ishikawa was announced as hitting coach for the Single–A San Jose Giants. On January 23, 2026, he was replaced in his role by Mike Marjama and was named as the hitting coach for the Giants rookie-level affiliate ACL Giants.

== Personal life ==
Ishikawa's mother is European American. His father, Alan, is the controller for a chain of Washington supermarkets and a third generation Japanese American. His paternal grandparents were held in an internment camp in Colorado during World War II.

Ishikawa met his first wife, Rochelle, a dental assistant, after being hit by a pitch in the face in his first game with San Jose. They married in 2007 and have three children, including a daughter who was born on Ishikawa's 25th birthday in 2008. Ishikawa became a Christian in 2007, which he believes helped him out of his slump that year. He says, "Faith will always be the biggest part of anything that happens." Ishikawa and Rochelle were divorced in 2022. He was introduced to his current wife, Mychal (Larson) Ishikawa, at church, and was married in 2026.
