= St. Louis Cardinals award winners and league leaders =

The St. Louis Cardinals, a professional baseball franchise based in St. Louis, Missouri, compete in the National League (NL) of Major League Baseball (MLB). Before joining the NL in 1892, they were also a charter member of the American Association (AA) from 1882 to 1891. Although St. Louis has been the Cardinals' home city for the franchise's entire existence, they were also known as the Brown Stockings, Browns, and Perfectos.

In 134 seasons, the franchise has won more than 10,000 regular season games and appeared in 27 postseasons while claiming 12 interleague championships and 23 league pennants. Eleven of the interleague championships are World Series titles won under the modern format since 1903; 19 of the league pennants are NL pennants, and the other four are AA pennants. Their 11 World Series titles represent the most in the NL and are second in MLB only to the New York Yankees' 27.

The first major award MLB presented for team performance occurred with the World Series champions in 1903, and for individual performance, in 1911 in the American League with the Chalmers Award. The first major award that the National League presented for individual performance was the League Award in 1924, the predecessor of the modern Most Valuable Player Award (MVP). Rogers Hornsby earned the League Award in 1925 making him the first winner of an MVP or its equivalent in franchise history. The following season, the Cardinals won their first modern World Series. They won the first World Series Trophy, following their 1967 World Series title, which, before that year, the World Series champion had never received any kind of official trophy.

== Individual awards ==
=== Major League Baseball Most Valuable Player Award ===
Major League Baseball (MLB), with voting by the Baseball Writers' Association of America (BBWAA), first presented the modern MVP award to one player each in the American and National League in 1931. Voting is accomplished with two writers from each city containing an MLB club, of whom each fills in a ballot with the names of ten players, ranking each from first to tenth. The BBWAA began polling three writers in each league city in 1938 and reduced that number to two per league city in 1961. One of the MVP award's predecessors was the League Award, which the National League awarded via of voting process in a similar fashion to that of the BBWAA from 1924 to 1929.

17 different Cardinals players have won the award a total of 21 times. Stan Musial and Albert Pujols are the only players to have won multiple times, each having won three times. Pujols is the only Cardinals player to have won in consecutive seasons, in 2008 and 2009. The most consecutive seasons a Cardinals player has won the award is three, which occurred from 1942 to 1944 between Mort Cooper, Musial, and Marty Marion. Typically awarded to position players, Cardinals pitchers who have won an MVP award are Cooper, Dizzy Dean, and Bob Gibson.

==== League Award (1924–1929) ====
- Rogers Hornsby (1925)
- Bob O'Farrell (1926)
- Jim Bottomley (1928)

==== Most Valuable Player Award (1931–present) ====
- Frankie Frisch (1931)
- Dizzy Dean (1934)
- Joe Medwick (1937)
- Mort Cooper (1942)
- Stan Musial [3] (1943, 1946, 1948)
- Marty Marion (1944)
- Ken Boyer (1964)
- Orlando Cepeda (1967)
- Bob Gibson (1968)
- Joe Torre (1971)
- Keith Hernandez (1979)
- Willie McGee (1985)
- Albert Pujols [3] (2005, 2008, 2009)
- Paul Goldschmidt (2022)

=== Cy Young Award (1956–present) ===
- Bob Gibson [2] (1968, 1970)
- Chris Carpenter (2005)

=== Rookie of the Year Award (1947–present) ===
- Wally Moon (1954)
- Bill Virdon (1955)
- Bake McBride (1974)
- Vince Coleman (1985)
- Todd Worrell (1986)
- Albert Pujols (2001)

=== Manager of the Year Award (1983–present) ===
- Whitey Herzog (1985)
- Tony La Russa (2002)
- Mike Shildt (2019)

=== Triple Crown ===
- Tip O'Neill (1887)
- Rogers Hornsby [2] (1922, 1925)
- Joe Medwick (1937)

=== Hank Aaron Award (1999–present) ===
- Albert Pujols [2] (2003, 2009)
- Paul Goldschmidt (2022)

=== World Series Most Valuable Player Award (1955–1993, 1995–present) ===
- Bob Gibson [2] (1964, 1967)
- Darrell Porter (1982)
- David Eckstein (2006)
- David Freese (2011)

=== League Championship Series Most Valuable Player (1977–1993, 1995–present) ===
- Darrell Porter (1982)
- Ozzie Smith (1985)
- Albert Pujols (2004)
- Jeff Suppan (2006)
- David Freese (2011)
- Michael Wacha (2013)

=== All-MLB Team (2019–present) ===
- **First team**
  - Paul Goldschmidt (1B, 2022)
  - Ryan Helsley (RP, 2024)
- **Second team**
  - Jack Flaherty (SP, 2019)
  - Nolan Arenado (3B, 2022)
  - Ryan Helsley (RP, 2022)
  - Jordan Montgomery (SP, 2023)
  - Jordan Walker (OF, 2026)

=== All-Star Game Selections (1933–2019, 2021–present) ===
- **Pitcher**
  - Bill Hallahan (1933)
  - Dizzy Dean [4] (1934–1937)
  - Bill Walker (1935)
  - Curt Davis (1939)
  - Lon Warneke [2] (1939, 1941)
  - Mort Cooper [2] (1942, 1943)
  - Max Lanier (1943)
  - Howie Pollet [3] (1943, 1946, 1949)
  - Red Munger [3] (1944, 1947, 1949)
  - Harry Brecheen [2] (1947, 1948)
  - Gerry Staley (1952)
  - Harvey Haddix [3] (1953–1955)
  - Luis Arroyo (1955)
  - Larry Jackson [3] (1957, 1958, 1960)
  - Wilmer Mizell (1959)
  - Lindy McDaniel (1960)
  - Bob Gibson [8] (1962, 1965–1970, 1972)
  - Steve Carlton [3] (1968, 1969, 1971)
  - Rick Wise (1973)
  - Lynn McGlothen (1974)
  - Bruce Sutter [2] (1981, 1984)
  - Joaquín Andújar [2] (1984, 1985)
  - Todd Worrell (1988)
  - Lee Smith [3] (1991–1993)
  - Bob Tewksbury (1992)
  - Tom Henke (1995)
  - Kent Bottenfield (1999)
  - Darryl Kile (2000)
  - Matt Morris [2] (2001, 2002)
  - Woody Williams (2003)
  - Chris Carpenter [3] (2005, 2006, 2010)
  - Jason Isringhausen (2005)
  - Ryan Franklin (2009)
  - Adam Wainwright [3] (2010, 2013, 2014)
  - Lance Lynn (2012)
  - Edward Mujica (2013)
  - Pat Neshek (2014)
  - Carlos Martínez [2] (2015, 2017)
  - Trevor Rosenthal (2015)
  - Michael Wacha (2015)
  - Miles Mikolas [2] (2018, 2022)
  - Alex Reyes (2021)
  - Ryan Helsley [2] (2022, 2024)
  - Riley O'Brien (2026)
- **Catcher**
  - Jim Wilson (1933)
  - Walker Cooper [3] (1942–1944)
  - Del Rice (1953)
  - Hal Smith [2] (1957, 1959)
  - Tim McCarver [2] (1966, 1967)
  - Ted Simmons [6] (1972–1974, 1977–1979)
  - Tony Peña (1989)
  - Tom Pagnozzi (1992)
  - Yadier Molina [10] (2009–2015, 2017, 2018, 2021)
- **First base**
  - Ripper Collins [2] (1935, 1936)
  - Johnny Mize [4] (1937, 1939–1941)
  - Orlando Cepeda (1967)
  - Dick Allen (1970)
  - Keith Hernandez [2] (1979, 1980)
  - Jack Clark [2] (1985, 1987)
  - Pedro Guerrero (1989)
  - Gregg Jefferies [2] (1993, 1994)
  - Allen Craig (2013)
  - Paul Goldschmidt (2022)
- **Second base**
  - Burgess Whitehead (1935)
  - Stu Martin (1936)
  - Jimmy Brown (1942)
  - Don Blasingame (1958)
  - Julián Javier [2] (1963, 1968)
  - Tom Herr (1985)
  - Brendan Donovan (2025)
- **Third base**
  - Whitey Kurowski [4] (1943, 1944, 1946, 1947)
  - Eddie Kazak (1949)
  - Ray Jablonski (1954)
  - Ken Boyer [7] (1955, 1959–1964)
  - Ken Reitz (1980)
  - Scott Rolen [4] (2003–2006)
  - David Freese (2012)
  - Nolan Arenado [3] (2021–2023)
- **Shortstop**
  - Leo Durocher (1936)
  - Marty Marion [7] (1943, 1944, 1946–1950)
  - Dick Groat [2] (1963, 1964)
  - Garry Templeton [2] (1977, 1979)
  - Ozzie Smith [14] (1982–1992, 1994–1996)
  - Royce Clayton (1997)
  - Édgar Rentería [3] (2000, 2003, 2004)
  - David Eckstein [2] (2005, 2006)
  - Rafael Furcal (2012)
  - Jhonny Peralta (2015)
  - Aledmys Díaz (2016)
  - Paul DeJong (2019)
- **Outfield**
  - Joe Medwick [6] (1934–1939)
  - Terry Moore [4] (1939–1942)
  - Enos Slaughter [10] (1941, 1942, 1946–1953)
  - Harry Walker (1943)
  - Wally Westlake (1951)
  - Rip Repulski (1956)
  - Wally Moon (1957)
  - Joe Cunningham (1959)
  - Curt Flood [3] (1964, 1966, 1968)
  - Lou Brock [6] (1967, 1971, 1972, 1974, 1975, 1979)
  - Reggie Smith [2] (1974, 1975)
  - Bake McBride (1976)
  - George Hendrick [2] (1980, 1983)
  - Lonnie Smith (1982)
  - Willie McGee [4] (1983, 1985, 1987, 1988)
  - Vince Coleman [2] (1988, 1989)
  - Félix José (1991)
  - Ray Lankford (1997)
  - Jim Edmonds [3] (2000, 2003, 2005)
  - Ryan Ludwick (2008)
  - Matt Holliday [4] (2010–2012, 2015)
  - Lance Berkman (2011)
  - Carlos Beltrán [2] (2012, 2013)
  - Jordan Walker (2026)
- **Designated hitter**
  - Iván Herrera (2026)
- **Managers**
  - Billy Southworth [2] (1943, 1944)
  - Eddie Dyer (1947)
  - Whitey Herzog [3] (1983, 1986, 1988)
  - Tony La Russa [4] (2003, 2005, 2007, 2012)
  - Mike Matheny (2014)
  - Oliver Marmol (2026)
- **Coaches**
  - Dave Ricketts [2] (1979, 1983)
  - Chuck Hiller (1983)
  - Mike Roarke (1986)
  - Rich Hacker (1988)
  - Nick Leyva (1988)
  - Johnny Lewis (1988)
  - Dave Duncan [3] (2005, 2007, 2012)
  - Marty Mason [2] (2005, 2007)
  - Hal McRae [2] (2005, 2007)
  - José Oquendo [4] (2005, 2007, 2012, 2014)
  - Dave McKay [3] (2005, 2007, 2012)
  - Joe Pettini [3] (2005, 2007, 2012)
  - Derek Lilliquist [2] (2012, 2014)
  - Mike Aldrete (2014)
  - Blaise Ilsley (2014)
  - John Mabry (2014)
  - Chris Maloney (2014)
- **Multiple Positions**
  - Frankie Frisch [3]; 2B (1933–1935); Manager (1935)
  - Pepper Martin [4]; 3B (1933–1935); OF (1937)
  - Stan Musial [20]; OF (1943, 1944, 1946–1949, 1951–1954, 1956, 1960–1963); 1B (1950, 1955, 1957–1959)
  - Red Schoendienst [14] 2B (1946, 1948–1955); Manager (1968, 1969, 1972, 1974, 1975)
  - Bill White [5]; OF (1959); 1B (1960, 1961, 1963, 1964)
  - Joe Torre [5]; C (1970); 3B (1971–1973); Manager (1992)
  - Mark McGwire [4]; 1B (1998–2000); Coach (2012)
  - Albert Pujols [10]; 3B (2001); OF (2003); 1B (2004–2010); DH (2022)
  - Matt Carpenter [3]; 2B (2013); 3B (2014, 2016)

=== Gold Glove Award (1957–present) ===
- **Pitcher**
  - Bobby Shantz [2] (1962–1964)
  - Bob Gibson [9] (1965–1973)
  - Joaquín Andújar (1984)
  - Adam Wainwright [2] (2009, 2013)
- **Catcher**
  - Tom Pagnozzi [3] (1991, 1992, 1994)
  - Mike Matheny [3] (2000, 2003, 2004)
  - Yadier Molina [8] (2008–2015, 2018)
- **First base**
  - Bill White [6] (1960–1965)
  - Keith Hernandez [6] (1978–1983)
  - Albert Pujols [2] (2006, 2010)
  - Paul Goldschmidt (2021)
- **Second base**
  - Fernando Viña [2] (2001, 2002)
  - Kolten Wong [2] (2019, 2020)
  - Tommy Edman (2021)
- **Third base**
  - Ken Boyer [5] (1958–1961, 1963)
  - Ken Reitz (1975)
  - Terry Pendleton [2] (1987, 1989)
  - Scott Rolen [4] (2002–2004, 2006)
  - Nolan Arenado [2] (2021, 2022)
- **Shortstop**
  - Dal Maxvill (1968)
  - Ozzie Smith [11] (1982–1992)
  - Édgar Rentería [2] (2002, 2003)
  - Masyn Winn (2025)
- **Outfield**
  - Curt Flood [7] (1963–1969)
  - Willie McGee [3] (1983, 1985, 1986)
  - Jim Edmonds [6] (2000–2005)
  - Jason Heyward (2015)
  - Tyler O'Neill [2] (2020, 2021)
  - Harrison Bader (2021)
- **Utility**
  - Brendan Donovan (2022)

=== Platinum Glove Award (2011–present) ===
The Platinum Glove is a fan-voted award conferred annually to single out the top-fielding player from all Gold Glove winners in each league.

- Yadier Molina [4] (2011, 2012, 2014, 2015)
- Nolan Arenado [2] (2021, 2022)

=== Wilson Defensive Player of the Year Award (2012–2019) ===
Note: In 2012 and 2013, the award was given to a player on each MLB team; one awardee was then named the Overall Defensive Player of the Year for the American League and another for the National League. From 2014 to 2019, the award was given to one player at each position for all of MLB; one of the nine awardees was then named the Overall Defensive Player of the Year for all of Major League Baseball.

- **Team (National League)**
  - Yadier Molina (2012, 2013)
- **Second base (MLB)**
  - Kolten Wong (2019)
- **Right field (MLB)**
  - Jason Heyward (2015)

=== Fielding Bible Award (2006–present) ===
- **Catcher**
  - Yadier Molina [6] (2007–2010, 2012, 2013)
- **First base**
  - Albert Pujols [5] (2006–2009, 2011)
  - Paul Goldschmidt (2021)
- **Second base**
  - Kolten Wong [3] (2018–2020)
- **Third base**
  - Nolan Arenado (2022)
- **Shortstop**
  - Masyn Winn (2024)
- **Left field**
  - Tyler O'Neill [2] (2020, 2021)
- **Right field**
  - Jason Heyward (2015)
- **Multi-position**
  - Tommy Edman (2022)

=== Silver Slugger Award (1980–present) ===
- **Pitcher (1980–2019, 2021)**
  - Bob Forsch [2] (1980, 1987)
  - Jason Marquis (2005)
  - Adam Wainwright (2017)
- **Catcher**
  - Ted Simmons (1980)
  - Yadier Molina (2013)
- **First base**
  - Keith Hernandez (1980)
  - George Hendrick (1983)
  - Jack Clark [2] (1985, 1987)
  - Mark McGwire (1998)
  - Albert Pujols [4] (2004, 2008–2010)
  - Paul Goldschmidt (2022)
- **Second base**
  - Matt Carpenter (2013)
- **Third base**
  - Albert Pujols (2001)
  - Scott Rolen (2002)
  - Nolan Arenado (2022)
- **Shortstop**
  - Ozzie Smith (1987)
  - Édgar Rentería [3] (2000, 2002, 2003)
- **Outfield**
  - George Hendrick (1980)
  - Willie McGee (1985)
  - Albert Pujols (2003)
  - Jim Edmonds (2004)
  - Ryan Ludwick (2008)
  - Matt Holliday (2010)
- **Utility**
  - Alec Burleson (2025)

=== Rolaids Relief Man Award (1976–2012) ===
- Bruce Sutter [3] (1981, 1982, 1984)
- Todd Worrell (1986)
- Lee Smith [2] (1991, 1992)
- Tom Henke (1995)

=== Reliever of the Year Award (2014–present) ===
- Ryan Helsley (2024)

=== Comeback Player of the Year Award (2005–present) ===
- Chris Carpenter (2009)
- Lance Berkman (2011)
- Albert Pujols (2022)

=== Roberto Clemente Award (1971–present) ===
- Lou Brock (1975)
- Ozzie Smith (1995)
- Albert Pujols (2008)
- Carlos Beltrán (2013)
- Yadier Molina (2018)
- Adam Wainwright (2020)

=== MLB All-Century Team (1999) ===
- Bob Gibson
- Rogers Hornsby
- Mark McGwire
- Stan Musial

=== DHL Hometown Heroes (2006) ===
Voted by MLB fans as the most outstanding player in the history of the franchise, based on on-field performance, leadership quality, and character value.

- Stan Musial

=== MLB All-Time Team (1997) ===
Cardinals award winners include those who played the highest number of games in their career with the Cardinals.

- Rogers Hornsby (2B)
- Stan Musial (LF Runner-up)

=== Sporting News Awards ===
==== MLB Athlete of the Decade (2000–2009) ====
- Albert Pujols

==== Sportsman of the Year / Pro Athlete of the Year / Athlete of the Year ====
Note: Normally awarded to one athlete across all sports.

- Lou Brock (1974)
- Whitey Herzog (1982)
- Mark McGwire [2] (1997, 1998)

==== Most Valuable Player Award (1929–1945) ====
- Dizzy Dean (1934)
- Joe Medwick (1937)
- Mort Cooper (1942)
- Stan Musial (1943)
- Marty Marion (1944)

==== Player of the Year Award ====
- Marty Marion (1944)
- Stan Musial [2] (1946, 1951)
- Ken Boyer (1964)
- Joe Torre (1971)
- Lou Brock (1974)
- Albert Pujols [3] (2003, 2008, 2009)

==== NL Pitcher of the Year Award ====
- Howie Pollet (1949)
- Bob Gibson (1968, 1970)
- Chris Carpenter (2005, 2006)

==== NL Rookie of the Year Award ====
- Wally Moon (1954)
- Bill Virdon (1955)
- Dick Hughes (1967)
- Reggie Cleveland (1971)
- Vince Coleman (1985)
- Todd Worrell (1986)
- Alan Benes (1996)
- Matt Morris (1997)
- Rick Ankiel (2000)
- Albert Pujols (2001)

==== NL Fireman of the Year / Reliever of the Year Award (1960–2010) ====
- Lindy McDaniel (1960)
- Al Hrabosky (1975)
- Bruce Sutter [3] (1981, 1982, 1984)
- Todd Worrell (1986)
- Lee Smith [2] (1991, 1992)
- Ryan Franklin (2009)

==== NL Comeback Player of the Year Award ====
- Lou Brock (1979)
- Joaquín Andújar (1984)
- John Tudor (1990)
- Matt Morris (2001)
- Chris Carpenter [2] (2004, 2009)
- Lance Berkman (2011)

==== Manager of the Year Award ====
- Billy Southworth [2] (1941, 1942)
- Eddie Dyer (1946)
- Eddie Stanky (1952)
- Fred Hutchinson (1957)
- Johnny Keane (1964)
- Whitey Herzog (1982)

==== Executive of the Year Award ====
- Branch Rickey [2] (1936, 1942)
- Frank Lane (1957)
- Bing Devine [2] (1963, 1964)
- Walt Jocketty [2] (2000, 2004)

=== Sports Illustrated MLB All-Decade Team (2009) ===
- Albert Pujols (1B)

=== Best Major League Baseball Player ESPY Award ===
- Mark McGwire (1999)
- Albert Pujols [4] (2005, 2006, 2009, 2010)

=== Topps All-Star Rookie teams ===
- 1960 – Julián Javier, 2B
- 1965 – Pat Corrales, C
- 1967 – Dick Hughes, RHP
- 1972 – Dwain Anderson, SS
- 1974 – Bake McBride, OF
- 1976 – Garry Templeton, SS
- 1982 – Willie McGee, OF
- 1985 – Vince Coleman, OF
- 1986 – Todd Worrell, RHP
- 1990 – Félix José, OF
- 1991 – Ray Lankford, OF
- 1995 – John Mabry, 1B
- 1996 – Alan Benes, RHP
- 1997 – Dmitri Young, 1B
- 2001 – Albert Pujols, 3B
- 2003 – Bo Hart, 2B
- 2010 – Jaime García, LHP
- 2013 – Matt Adams, 1B
- 2014 – Kolten Wong, 2B
- 2015 – Randal Grichuk, OF
- 2016 – Seung-hwan Oh, RP
- 2017 – Paul DeJong, SS
- 2018 – Harrison Bader, OF
- 2020 – Kwang-hyun Kim, LHP
- 2021 – Dylan Carlson, OF
- 2022 – Brendan Donovan, 2B
- 2024 – Masyn Winn, SS

=== Players Choice Awards ===
In 1992, the Comeback Player of the Year was the first and only Players' Choice honor; others followed in subsequent years.

==== Player of the Year ====
- Mark McGwire (1998)
- Albert Pujols [3] (2003, 2008, 2009)

==== Marvin Miller Man of the Year ====
- Mark McGwire (1997)
- Eric Davis (2000)
- Albert Pujols (2006)

==== NL Outstanding Player ====
- Albert Pujols [3] (2003, 2008, 2009)
- Paul Goldschmidt (2022)

==== NL Outstanding Pitcher ====
- Chris Carpenter [2] (2005, 2006)
- Adam Wainwright (2009)

==== NL Outstanding Rookie ====
- Albert Pujols (2001)

==== NL Comeback Player ====
- Matt Morris (2001)
- Chris Carpenter [2] (2004, 2009)
- Lance Berkman (2011)

=== MLB Insiders Club Magazine All-Postseason Team (2011) ===
- Albert Pujols (1B)
- David Freese (3B)
- Lance Berkman (OF; 1 of 3)
- Chris Carpenter (SP; 1 of 3)
- Jason Motte (RP)

=== Lou Gehrig Memorial Award ===
- Stan Musial (1957)
- Ken Boyer (1964)
- Lou Brock (1977)
- Ozzie Smith (1989)
- Mark McGwire (1999)
- Albert Pujols (2009)
- Paul Goldschmidt (2023)

=== Heart & Hustle Award ===
- David Eckstein (2005)
- Albert Pujols (2009)
- Paul Goldschmidt (2022)

=== Tony Conigliaro Award ===
- Chris Carpenter (2009)
- Mitch Harris (2015)

=== Branch Rickey Award (1992–2014) ===
- Ozzie Smith (1994)

=== Ford C. Frick Award ===
Names in bold received the award based on their work as Cardinals broadcasters.

- **Jack Buck** (1987)
- **Harry Caray** (1989)
- Joe Garagiola (1991)*
- Milo Hamilton (1992)
- Tim McCarver (2012)*

* Played and broadcast for the Cardinals

== Team Awards ==
Note: The Cardinals were originally known as the St. Louis Brown Stockings (1882), St. Louis Browns (1883–1898), and St. Louis Perfectos (1899), before becoming the Cardinals in 1900.

- 1885 – American Association pennant
- 1885 – tied "World Series", 3-3-1, with Chicago NL
- 1886 – American Association pennant
- 1886 – won "World Series", 4–2, over Chicago NL
- 1887 – American Association pennant
- 1888 – American Association pennant
- 1926 – National League pennant
- 1926 – World Series championship
- 1928 – National League pennant
- 1930 – National League pennant
- 1931 – National League pennant
- 1931 – World Series championship (2)
- 1934 – National League pennant
- 1934 – World Series championship (3)
- 1942 – National League pennant
- 1942 – World Series championship (4)
- 1943 – National League pennant
- 1944 – National League pennant
- 1944 – World Series championship (5)
- 1946 – National League pennant
- 1946 – World Series championship (6)
- 1964 – National League pennant
- 1964 – World Series championship (7)
- 1967 – National League pennant
- 1967 – World Series Trophy (8)
- 1968 – National League pennant
- 1982 – Warren Giles Trophy (National League champion)
- 1982 – World Series Trophy (9)
- 1985 – Warren Giles Trophy (National League champion)
- 1987 – Warren Giles Trophy (National League champion)
- 2004 – Warren Giles Trophy (National League champion)
- 2006 – Warren Giles Trophy (National League champion)
- 2006 – Commissioner's Trophy (World Series) (10)
- 2006 – Jack Buck Award
- 2011 – Warren Giles Trophy (National League champion)
- 2011 – Commissioner's Trophy (World Series) (11)
- 2011 – Baseball America Organization of the Year
- 2013 – Warren Giles Trophy (National League champion)
- 2013 – Baseball America Organization of the Year

== Minor-league system ==
=== Minor League Player and Pitcher of the Year ===
- 1995 – Mike Gulan (3B) and Mike Busby (RHP)
- 1996 – Dmitri Young (INF) and Britt Reames (RHP)
- 1997 – Brent Butler (INF) and Cliff Politte (RHP)
- 1998 – Pablo Ozuna (INF) and Rick Ankiel (LHP)
- 1999 – Adam Kennedy (INF) and Rick Ankiel (LHP)
- 2000 – Albert Pujols (3B) and Bud Smith (LHP)
- 2001 – Coco Crisp (OF) and Jimmy Journell (RHP)
- 2002 – John Gall (1B) and Tyler Johnson (LHP)
- 2003 – John Gall (1B) and Dan Haren (RHP)
- 2004 – Reid Gorecki (OF) and Anthony Reyes (RHP)
- 2005 – Travis Hanson (3B) and Mark Worrell (RHP)
- 2006 – Colby Rasmus (OF) and Blake Hawksworth (RHP)
- 2007 – Colby Rasmus (OF) and P. J. Walters (RHP)
- 2008 – Daryl Jones (OF) and Jess Todd (RHP)
- 2009 – Allen Craig (LF/1B) and Lance Lynn (RHP)
- 2010 – Matt Carpenter (3B) and Shelby Miller (RHP)
- 2011 – Matt Adams (1B) and Shelby Miller (RHP)
- 2012 – Oscar Taveras (OF) and Seth Maness (RHP)
- 2013 – Kolten Wong (2B) and Zach Petrick (RHP)
- 2014 – Magneuris Sierra (OF) and Marco Gonzales (LHP)
- 2015 – Stephen Piscotty (OF) and Austin Gomber (LHP)/Alex Reyes (RHP)
- 2016 – Carson Kelly (C) and Luke Weaver (RHP)
- 2017 – Harrison Bader (OF) and Jack Flaherty (RHP)
- 2018 – Tyler O'Neill (OF) and Dakota Hudson (RHP)
- 2019 – Dylan Carlson (OF) and Ángel Rondón (RHP)
- 2021 – Jordan Walker (3B) and Freddy Pacheco (RHP)
- 2022 – Moisés Gómez (OF)/Jordan Walker (3B/OF) and Gordon Graceffo (RHP)
- 2023 – Iván Herrera (C) and Max Rajcic (RHP)
- 2024 – Jimmy Crooks (C) and Quinn Mathews (LHP)
- 2025 – JJ Wetherholt (INF) and Brycen Mautz (LHP)
- 2026 – Rainiel Rodríguez (C) and Mason Molina (LHP)

=== Baseball America Minor League Player of the Year Award ===
- 1999 – Rick Ankiel

=== USA Today Minor League Player of the Year Award ===
- 1999 – Rick Ankiel

=== Joe Bauman Home Run Award ===
- 2002 – Iván Cruz (Memphis Redbirds)
- 2022 – Moisés Gómez (Springfield Cardinals and Memphis Redbirds)

== Other achievements ==
=== National Baseball Hall of Fame ===
See St. Louis Cardinals#Hall of Famers

=== St. Louis Cardinals Hall of Fame ===
See St. Louis Cardinals Hall of Fame Museum

=== Darryl Kile Good Guy Award ===
See: Darryl Kile Award and footnote

- 2003 – Mike Matheny
- 2004 – Woody Williams
- 2005 – Cal Eldred
- 2006 – Chris Carpenter
- 2007 – Russ Springer
- 2008 – Adam Wainwright
- 2009 – Skip Schumaker
- 2010 – Matt Holliday
- 2011 – Lance Berkman
- 2012 – Jake Westbrook
- 2013 – Jason Motte
- 2014 – Mark Ellis
- 2015 – Yadier Molina
- 2016 – Jonathan Broxton
- 2017 – Zach Duke
- 2018 – Miles Mikolas
- 2019 – Paul Goldschmidt

=== Retired numbers ===
See St. Louis Cardinals#Retired numbers

=== Sports Illustrated Top 20 Male Athletes of the Decade ===
- 2009 – Albert Pujols (#9)

=== Associated Press Athlete of the Year ===
- 1934 – Dizzy Dean
- 1998 – Mark McGwire

=== Missouri Sports Hall of Fame ===
See: St. Louis Cardinals § Inducted into the Missouri Sports Hall of Fame.

=== Jack Buck Award ===
- 1987 – August A. Busch Jr., former brewer, prominent sportsman, and owner of the St. Louis Cardinals
- 1994 – Stan Musial, St. Louis Cardinal Hall of Famer
- 1996 – Bill DeWitt, longtime Major League Baseball executive and former owner of St. Louis Browns
- 2010 – Ernie Hays, former St. Louis Cardinals organist

== See also ==
- List of St. Louis Cardinals team records
- Major League Baseball titles leaders
- List of Major League Baseball individual streaks
- Baseball awards
- List of MLB awards
