= Petrick =

Petrick is a surname. Notable people with the surname include:

- Ben Petrick (born 1977), American baseball player
- Billy Petrick (born 1984), American baseball player
- Charlotte Petrick (born 1997), Canadian professional tennis player
- George Petrick (1917–1982), American politician
- Jose Petrick (born 1924), Australian historian
- Joseph M. Petrick (born 1982), American writer and director
- Wolfgang Petrick (1939–2025), German painter, graphic artist and sculptor
- Zach Petrick (born 1989), American baseball pitcher

== See also ==
- Petrick's method, a calculation method in boolean algebra by Stanley R. Petrick
- Petrik, people with this name
