= Kolten Wong =

American baseball player (born 1990)

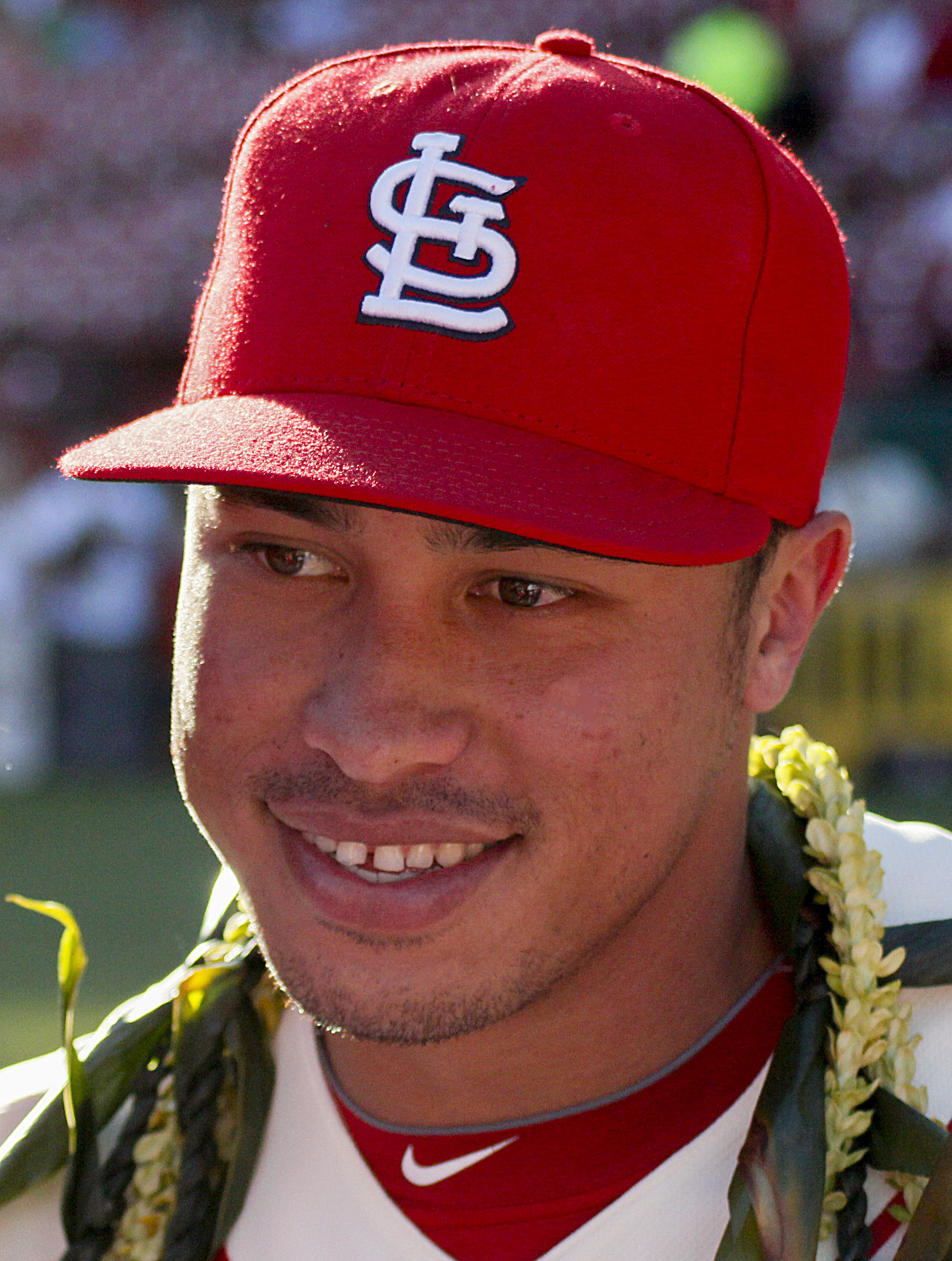
- Wong with the St. Louis Cardinals in 2013
- Second baseman
- Born: October 10, 1990 (age 36); Hilo, Hawaii, U.S.
- Batted: Left Threw: Right

MLB debut
- August 16, 2013, for the St. Louis Cardinals

Last appearance
- October 1, 2023, for the Los Angeles Dodgers

MLB statistics
- Batting average: .256
- Home runs: 86
- Runs batted in: 405
- Stats at Baseball Reference

Teams
- St. Louis Cardinals (2013–2020); Milwaukee Brewers (2021–2022); Seattle Mariners (2023); Los Angeles Dodgers (2023)

Career highlights and awards
- 2× Gold Glove Award (2019, 2020)

Kolten Kaha Wong (born October 10, 1990) is an American former professional baseball second baseman. He played 11 seasons in Major League Baseball (MLB) for the St. Louis Cardinals, Milwaukee Brewers, Seattle Mariners, and Los Angeles Dodgers.

From Hilo, Hawaii, Wong starred in baseball at Kamehameha Hawaii High School and for the University of Hawaii at Manoa. The St. Louis Cardinals selected Wong in the first round of the 2011 Major League Baseball draft, and promoted him to the major leagues two years later. He was named the National League Rookie of the Month for May 2014. Wong was the Cardinals' starting second baseman for the majority of his tenure with the team, winning two Gold Gloves and three Fielding Bible Awards. The Cardinals declined Wong's player option for the 2021 season, making him a free agent for the first time in his career. He then signed with Milwaukee, with whom he played two seasons, before he was traded to the Mariners following the 2022 season. Seattle released him in the 2023 season, and he played his final MLB games with the Dodgers that September.

== Early life ==
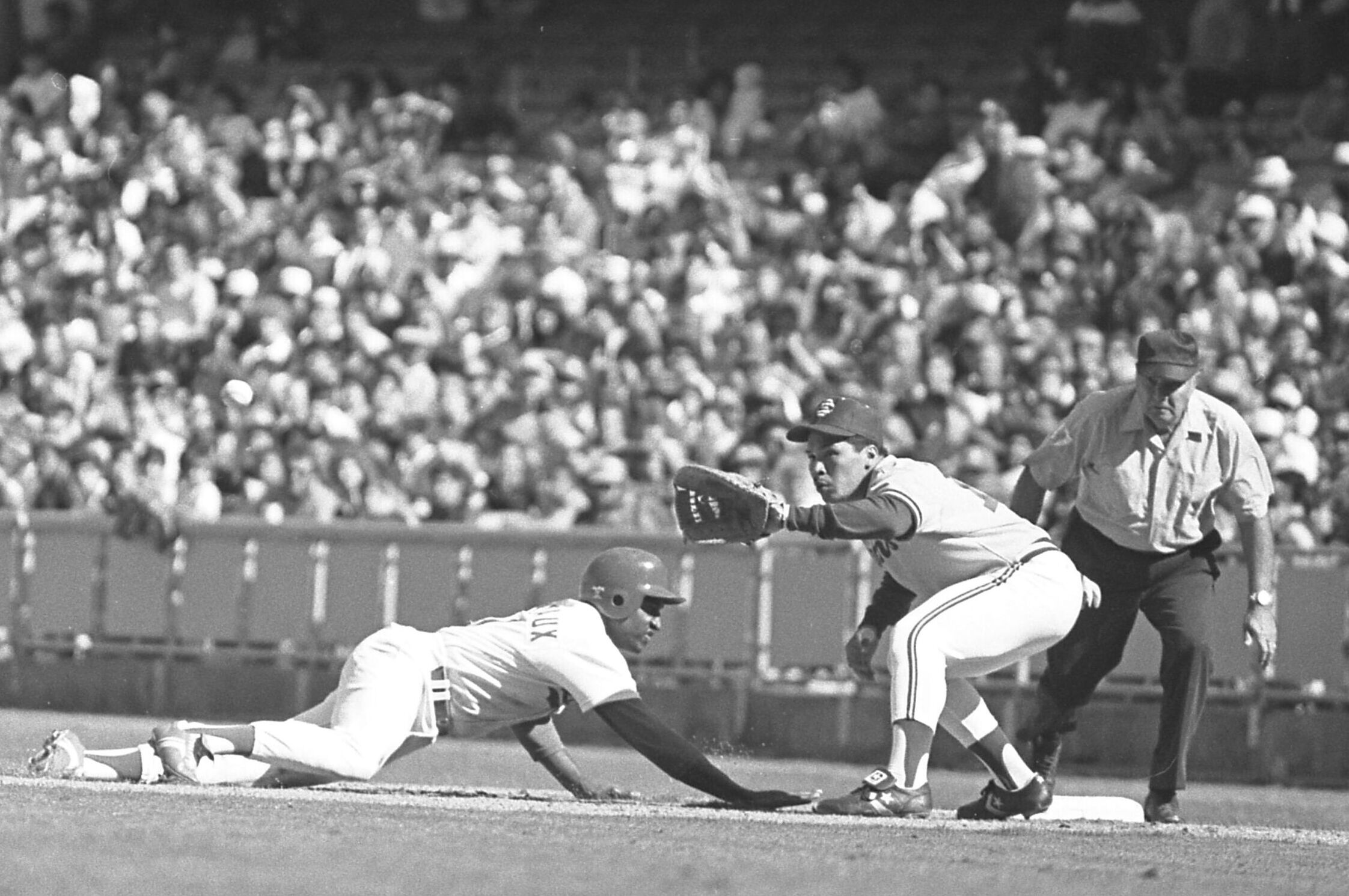
Kaha Wong playing first base for the USC Trojans at Dodger Stadium in 1986

Kolten Wong is the son of Kolen "Kaha" Wong, who played college baseball at the University of Southern California (USC), and spent two years in the minor leagues with the Reno Silver Sox in Class-A and Keala Wong. Despite batting .280 in 157 minor league games, Wong returned to Hilo, Hawaii to raise his family. He rose to prominence as a baseball coach in Hawaii. Instead of pursuing a steady career, he took whatever jobs would afford him the most time to teach Kolten the game and about working out, which he emphasized on a daily basis. In time, Kolten Wong befriended mixed martial artist and Ultimate Fighting Championship star B. J. Penn, whose father, Jay Dee Penn, correspondingly befriended Kaha Wong. The Penn’s ran a gym which allowed Kaha Wong to train children how to swing a bat.

To train as a baseball player, Wong spent two hours daily cutting trees with an axe to improve his strength and daily sessions in a batting cage. He participated in the Cal Ripken World Series in Aberdeen, Maryland where he led his team, Pacific Southwest, to the championship. He also played in the 2007 Senior League World Series, with his team from Hilo American Little League.

== High school and college career ==
Wong was a two-sport star at Kamehameha Schools Hawaii in Keaau, Hawaii, playing baseball and football. As a baseball standout, Wong batted .600 during his senior year and was named a co-winner for the 2008 Hawaii Baseball Player of the Year honor. Wong was a top scholar as well.

The Minnesota Twins drafted him in the 16th round of the 2008 Major League Baseball draft. A scout from the Twins presented Wong with a $75,000 contract offer, which he refused, stating that "after taxes, it's not even that much". Wong chose not to sign, opting to attend the University of Hawaii, where he played college baseball for the Hawaii Rainbow Warriors.

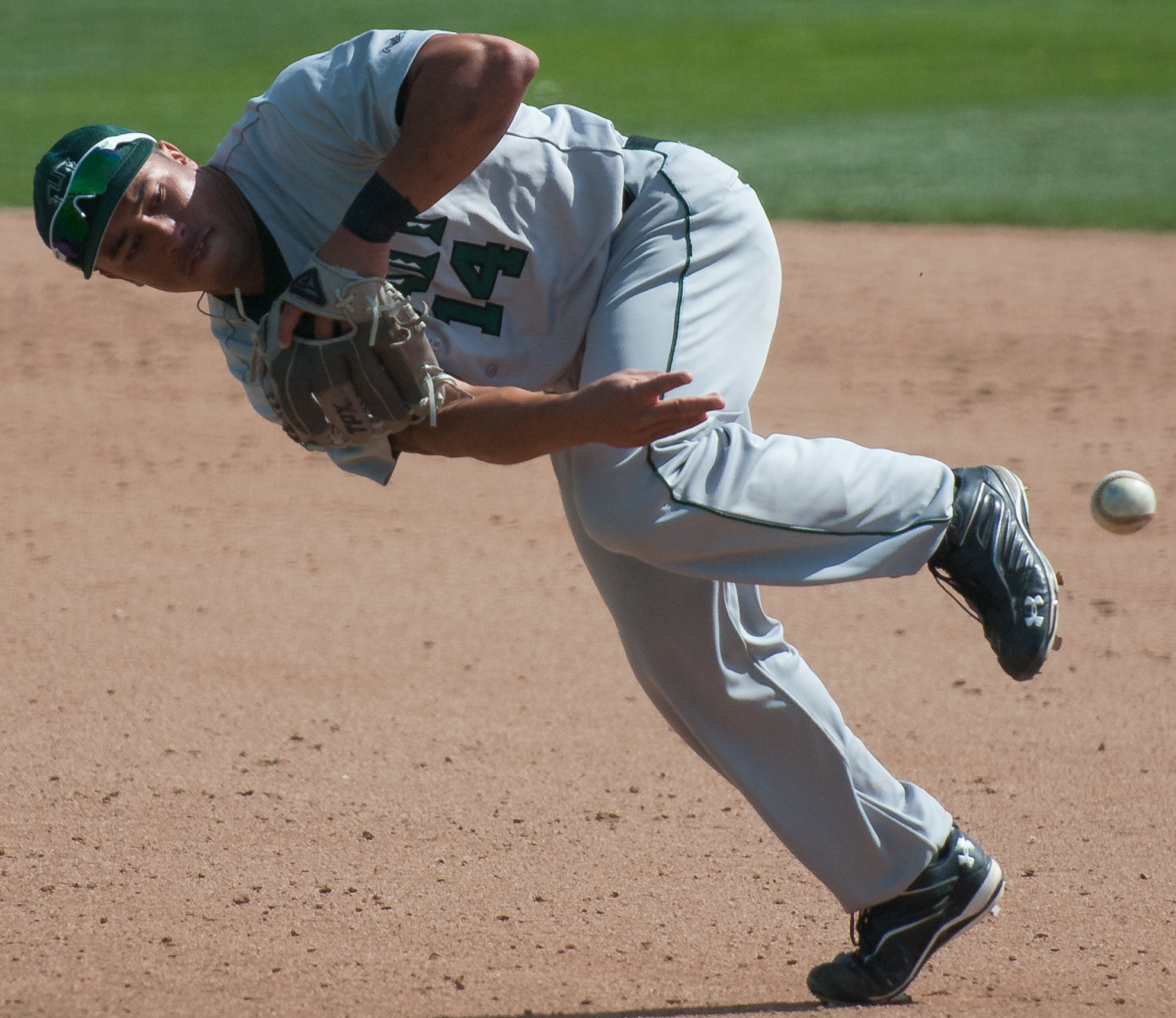
Wong with Hawaii in 2011

In a game against Loyola Marymount in his freshman year, he hit three home runs (HR). The Rainbow Warriors won a Western Athletic Conference (WAC) tournament in his sophomore year and a regular season championship. Against Louisiana Tech in the WAC tournament, he hit the game-tying and game-winning home runs. Wong was a three-time first-team All-WAC selection.

As a freshman, he played center field and batted .341 with 11 HR. During his sophomore year, he hit .357 with a .534 slugging percentage (SLG), .436 on-base percentage (OBP), 19 stolen bases and 40 runs batted in (RBIs). Playing for the Orleans Firebirds of the Cape Cod Baseball League (CCBL) in 2010, he was named a CCBL All-Star and the Pat Sorenti Most Valuable Player. His batting average (.341) ranked him third in the CCBL that summer, his slugging (.452) was fourth, OBP (.426) second, and stolen bases (22) second, while making just four errors in 145 chances for a .972 fielding percentage. Wong was inducted into the CCBL Hall of Fame in 2016.

During his junior year at Hawaii, Wong led the team in batting average at .378 and was fourth in the WAC; he also finished fourth in the WAC in SLG (.560) and third in OBP at .492. Other totals included 48 runs scored, 11 doubles, seven home runs, 23 stolen bases, and 42 bases on balls. Wong was named a Baseball America All-American in 2011. He finished his college career with a .358 batting average (245 hits in 684 at-bats), 47 doubles, 25 home runs, 145 RBIs, a .563 SLG and .449 OBP. He stole 53 bases in 71 attempts.

The University of Hawaii baseball program retired Wong's uniform number, 14, in 2017.

== Professional career ==
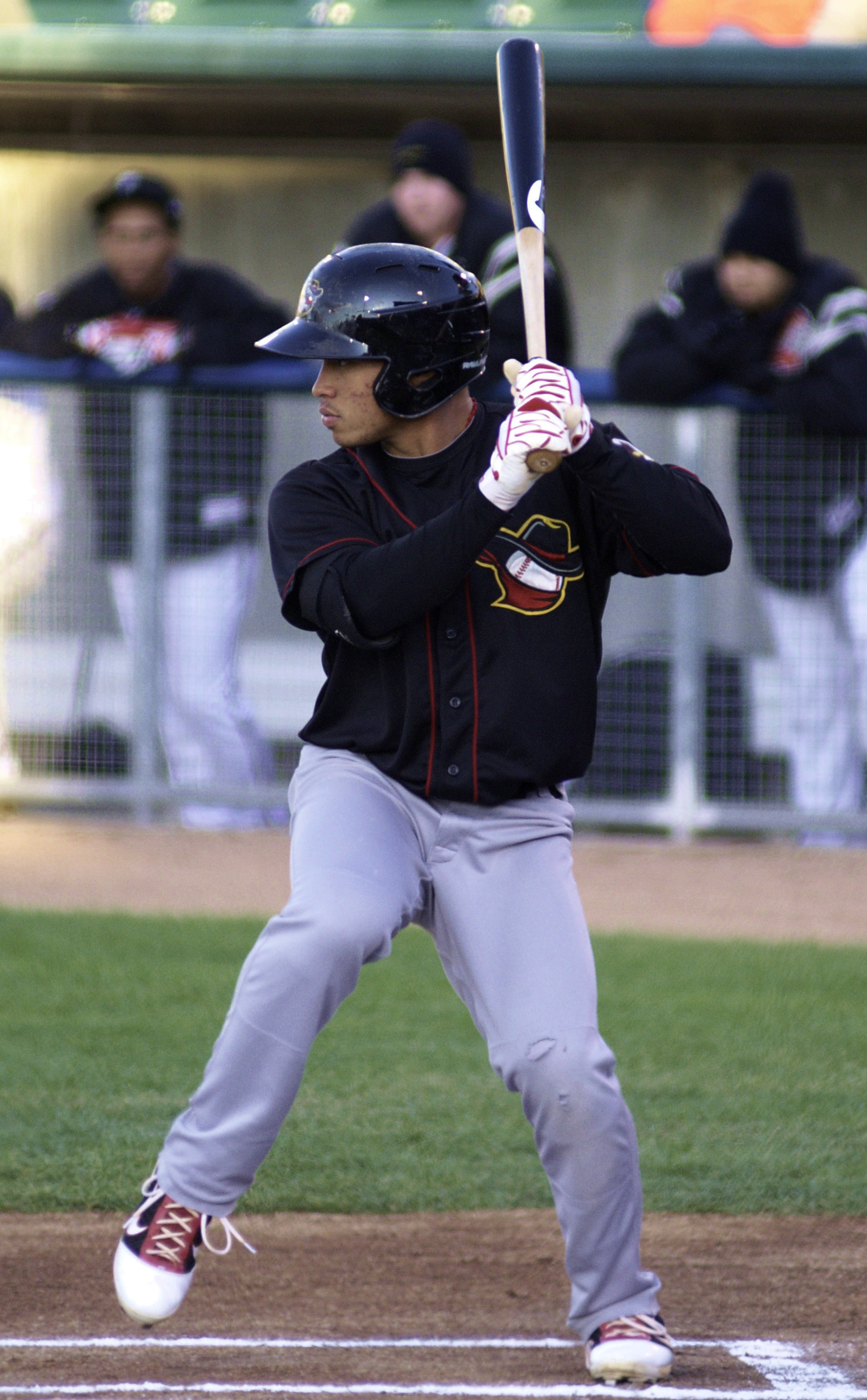
Wong batting for the Quad Cities River Bandits in 2011

=== St. Louis Cardinals ===
==== 2011−2013 ====
Eligible for the amateur draft after his junior season at Hawaii, the Cardinals selected Wong in the first round with the 22nd overall selection of the 2011 Major League Baseball draft. He made his professional debut that season with the Quad Cities River Bandits of the Single-A Midwest League. In 47 games, he batted .335 with 15 doubles, five home runs, 25 RBIs, and nine stolen bases.

After earning a promotion to the Springfield Cardinals of the Double–A Texas League in 2012, Wong batted .287 with 52 RBIs and 21 stolen bases. He was selected for the 2012 All-Star Futures Game. Wong finished the year playing in the Arizona Fall League (AFL), where he batted .324 with 12 RBIs and five stolen bases. He was selected for the AFL "Top Prospect" team for second base after the season concluded. After the season, MLB.com ranked him as the Cardinals' fourth best prospect.

The Cardinals promoted Wong to the Memphis Redbirds of the Triple-A Pacific Coast League in 2013, where he spent most of the year. Putting together a 20-game hitting streak in May, Wong collected 30 hits in 70 at bats (AB). He also had 10 multi-hit games during that streak. His totals at Memphis included a .303 batting average with 10 home runs, 45 RBIs, and 20 stolen bases in 107 games, before the Cardinals called him up to the Major Leagues on August 16. He participated in his second All-Star Futures Game in July. He appeared in 32 MLB games, collecting nine hits in 59 AB with one double for a .153 batting average. In December, the Cardinals named him their Minor League Player of the Year for 2013.

Manager Mike Matheny named Wong to the 2013 Cardinals' postseason roster. He played in seven total games between the National League Division Series (NLDS), National League Championship Series (NLCS) and World Series. He made his World Series debut in Game 3 against the Boston Red Sox as a defensive substitution and collected a hit in the bottom of the eighth inning in his only Series plate appearance. Wong also appeared in Game 4 when Matheny inserted him as a pinch runner in the ninth inning. However, Boston closer Koji Uehara picked him off first base for the final out of the game, the only occasion in which a World Series game ended on a pickoff play.^{[a]} Boston won the game, 4–2, and went on to win the Series, 4–2.

==== 2014 ====
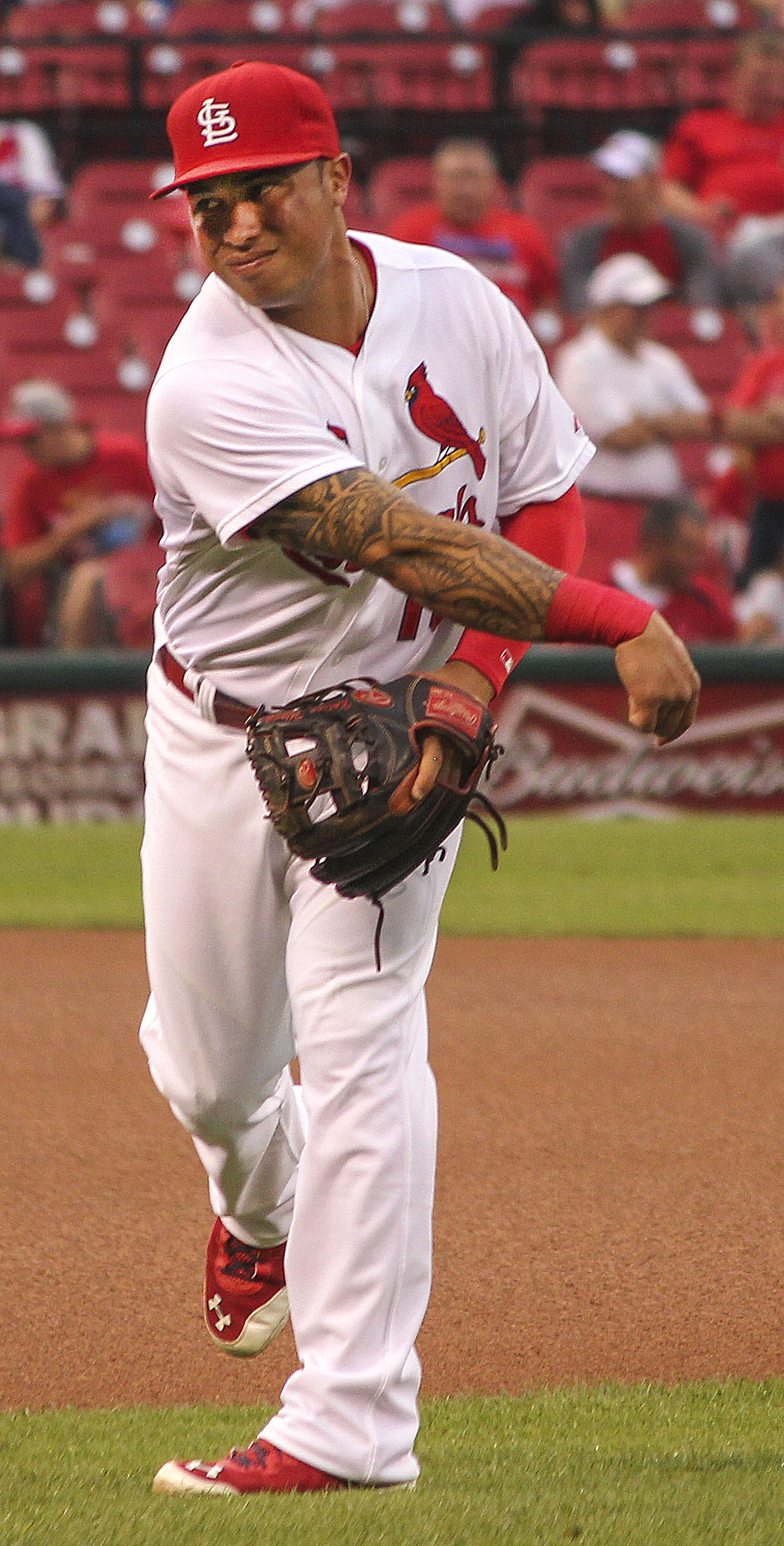
Wong playing for the St. Louis Cardinals in 2014

Wong became the de facto starter out of spring training for 2014. The Cardinals had traded third baseman David Freese, and second baseman Matt Carpenter had been moved to third base. The Cardinals signed veteran free agent Mark Ellis to provide insurance and guidance for him. Wong struggled early, batting .225 in April, and was demoted to Memphis. He returned to the MLB club in May after hitting .344 with two homers, five steals, and an .867 on-base plus slugging (OPS) in 15 games, and also developed a modified swing.

Batting .333 with the Cardinals in May, Wong recorded the highest average for rookies with a minimum of 40 plate appearances. He also made no defensive errors. Wong's plus-7 defensive runs saved led NL second basemen despite spending time in the minor leagues. He was therefore named the National League Rookie of the Month. On June 3, he hit his first career MLB home run, a grand slam against the Royals ace James Shields. But when he reaggravated a shoulder injury sustained earlier in the month, the Cardinals placed Wong on the 15-day disabled list (DL) on June 21. After returning from the DL, Wong hit a double to tie the score 2–2 in the second inning of a July 8 contest against the Pittsburgh Pirates. With the score tied 4–4 in the bottom of the ninth of that game, he hit his first walk-off home run off Ernesto Frieri. In a seven-game span beginning with a return from that DL stint and ending with the beginning of the All-Star break, he hit five home runs.

After enduring three games with three strikeouts each in a previous eight-game period, Wong finished a triple short of the cycle in an August 2 game against division rival Milwaukee Brewers. His first career multi-home run game came five days later in a 3-for-4 performance with two home runs against the Red Sox. Against the Baltimore Orioles on August 10, he notched his second career four-hit game in an 8–3 victory. He batted .254 after being recalled from Memphis, including a .315 average against left-handed pitching. Wong started 100 games at second base, finishing with a .249 batting average, 12 home runs, 54 RBI, 42 runs scored and led the club with 20 stolen bases.

The Cardinals won the National League Central Division. In Game 3 of the NLDS versus the Los Angeles Dodgers, his seventh-inning, two-run homer broke a tie and provided the final margin in the Cardinals' 3–1 victory. In Game 2 of the NLCS against the San Francisco Giants on October 12, Wong hit his second career MLB walk-off home run, a solo shot that secured a 1–1 tie in the series for the Cardinals. This was the fourth postseason walk-off home run in franchise history, following Ozzie Smith (1985 NLCS), Jim Edmonds (2004 NLCS), and Freese (2011 World Series). In MLB postseason history, Wong became the third second baseman to accomplish the walk-off feat, after Bill Mazeroski (1960 World Series) and Jeff Kent (2004 NLCS). For the 2014 postseason, Wong appeared in eight games, hitting three home runs and three doubles. He finished third in the National League Rookie of the Year Award voting.

==== 2015−2020 ====
Wong contributed to the Cardinals' early success in 2015. On April 22 against the Washington Nationals, he had three hits, including a home run, and fielded would-be base hits from Yunel Escobar and Wilson Ramos (fifth and sixth innings) on the third base side of second, and turned and threw both out. He hit his second career regular-season walk-off home run against Pittsburgh on May 3 in the 14th inning for a 3–2 decision. During an eight-game hitting streak from May 3–10, he batted .517 with 3 home runs. For the season, he batted .262 with 28 doubles, four triples, 11 home runs, and 71 runs scored.

On March 2, 2016, Wong agreed to a five-year extension with the Cardinals worth $25.5 million, with $12.5 million team option for 2021. He struggled early, batting .222 with a .571 OPS through June 5, and the Cardinals demoted him to Memphis the next day. With Memphis, Wong began to gain experience as a center fielder. In his debut with Memphis, he hit two home runs, including a grand slam, in an 8−5 win over Colorado Springs. The Cardinals recalled Wong on June 17. His ninth-inning, RBI double in the July 27 game against the New York Mets drove in the game-winning run for a 5−4 final score, where Jeurys Familia’s consecutive-saves streak had ended one batter earlier to Yadier Molina at 52, the third-longest in major league history. Wong finished 2016 with a .240 batting average, five home runs, 23 RBIs, and a .682 OPS.

In 2017, Wong bounced back strong despite playing in only 108 games. He hit .285 with four home runs and 42 RBIs along with walking a career high 41 times.

On May 5, 2018, Wong hit a walk-off home run against Chicago Cubs reliever Luke Farrell in the bottom of the ninth inning. His 2-run home run helped St. Louis to an 8–6 victory. On June 2, Wong hit a walk-off home run versus Richard Rodríguez of the Pittsburgh Pirates for a 3–2 win. It was Wong's fourth career walk-off home run. Wong finished his 2018 campaign batting .249 with nine home runs and 38 RBIs along with tallying 19 Defensive Runs Saved in 127 games. Wong was nominated for a Gold Glove, his first ever nomination, but fell short to DJ LeMahieu.

On March 28, 2019, Wong hit a two-run home run in his first at bat of the season against the Milwaukee Brewers, and hit another later in the game. Wong finished his 2019 regular season slashing .285/.361/.423 with 11 home runs, 59 RBIs, and 24 stolen bases over 148 games. He led the major leagues in bunt hits (11). On defense, he had a 14 Defensive Runs Saved (DRS) rating, the best in the major leagues among second basemen. He was nominated for a Gold Glove for the second consecutive season and won the award for the first time in his career.

In a shortened 2020 season, Wong batted .265/.350/.326 with one home run and 16 RBIs over 53 games with a .989 fielding percentage. He was awarded his second consecutive Gold Glove after leading major league second basemen in defense runs saved, defensive WAR, double plays turned, and double plays started. The Cardinals declined his team option for 2021, thus making him a free agent for the first time in his career.

=== Milwaukee Brewers (2021–2022) ===
On February 5, 2021, Wong signed a two-year, $18 million contract with the Milwaukee Brewers. The contract included a club option for the 2023 season. He hit .272 with 14 homers and 50 RBI that season in 116 games, then in 2022, he hit .251 in 134 games with 15 homers and 47 RBI. On November 8, the Brewers exercised Wong's $10 million option for the 2023 season.

=== Seattle Mariners (2023) ===
On December 2, 2022, the Brewers traded Wong to the Seattle Mariners for Abraham Toro and Jesse Winker. Wong opened the season in a platoon at second base but struggled and began to lose playing time to José Caballero by May. Wong batted .165 with two home runs and 19 RBI in 67 games for the Mariners before he was designated for assignment on August 1 and released on August 3.

=== Los Angeles Dodgers (2023) ===
On August 18, 2023, Wong signed a minor league contract with the Los Angeles Dodgers. After playing in five games split between the Rookie-level Arizona Complex League Dodgers and Triple-A Oklahoma City Dodgers, he was added to the 40-man roster and called up to the majors on September 1. In his debut at bat with the Dodgers, he hit a three-run home run. He played in 20 games for the Dodgers, batting .300 (9-for-30) with two homers and eight RBI. He became a free agent following the season.

=== Arizona Diamondbacks ===
On February 28, 2024, Wong signed a minor league contract with the Baltimore Orioles. On March 22, he triggered the opt-out clause in his contract and Baltimore released him two days later.

On April 10, 2024, Wong signed a minor league contract with the Arizona Diamondbacks. In 31 games for the Triple-A Reno Aces, he batted .271/.339/.383 with two home runs and 16 RBI. Wong was released by the Diamondbacks organization on May 27.

Wong announced his retirement from professional baseball on May 16, 2025.

=== Post-playing career ===
On July 2, 2026, Wong was announced as the first base coach for the National League at the All-Star Futures Game.

== Awards ==
Award/honor	# of times	Dates (Ranking or event)	Refs
Major leagues
National League Gold Glove Award	2	2019, 2020	
National League Rookie of the Month	1	May 2014	
Minor leagues
Major League Baseball All-Star Futures Game	2	2012, 2013	
Minor Leagues All-Star	3	2012 midseason and postseason (Texas League), 2012 All-Prospect Team (Arizona Fall League)	
St. Louis Cardinals Minor League Player of the Year	1	2013	
Baseball America Top 100 Prospects	3	pre-2012 (#93), pre-2013 (#84), pre-2014 (#58)	
MLB.com Top 100 prospects	2	pre-2013 (#79), pre-2014 (#58)	
Baseball Prospectus Top 100 Prospects	3	pre-2012 (#88), pre-2013 (#90), pre-2014 (#33)	

== Personal life ==
Wong grew up an Atlanta Braves fan. His brother, Kean, also played second base, appearing in 39 major league games. Their sister, Kiani, played college softball at Hawaii. On December 19, 2013, Wong's mother died from cancer.

Wong is of Native Hawaiian, Chinese, Filipino, and Portuguese descent. Wong's paternal great-grandparents were Chinese.

In November 2015, Wong married Alissa Noll. They met while both attending the University of Hawaii, where she was a track and field athlete. They reside in Honolulu, Hawaii during the offseason. They also owned a home in Creve Coeur, Missouri, but sold it after Wong signed with Milwaukee. In March 2021, Wong announced they were expecting their first child. Their son was born that September.

Wong began fundraising to help families impacted by the 2018 lower Puna eruption in May 2018 by creating a GoFundMe page that has raised over $58,000.

== See also ==
- List of University of Hawaii alumni
- St. Louis Cardinals award winners and league leaders

== Notes ==
^{a} Although the 1926 World Series between the Cardinals and the New York Yankees ended on the base path, it was on a stolen base attempt by Babe Ruth, not a pickoff.
