= Petrik =

Petrik is a name which can serve as a given name and as a surname.

Notable people with the given name:

- Petrik Sander (born 1960), German football player and manager

Notable people with the surname:

- Helmut Petrik
- Karen Petrik (born 1997), American rower
- Lajos Petrik (1851–1932), Hungarian chemist, ceramist and teacher
- Larisa Petrik (born 1949), Soviet gymnast
- Nikolas Petrik (born 1984), Austrian ice hockey player
- Roman Petrík
- Ryan Petrik
- Sergey Petrik
- Simona Petrík
- Stanislav Petrík (born 1977), Slovak ice hockey player
- Viktor Petrik (born 1946), Russian businessman

== See also ==
- Petrick, people with this surname
