= Matt Carpenter =

American baseball player (born 1985)

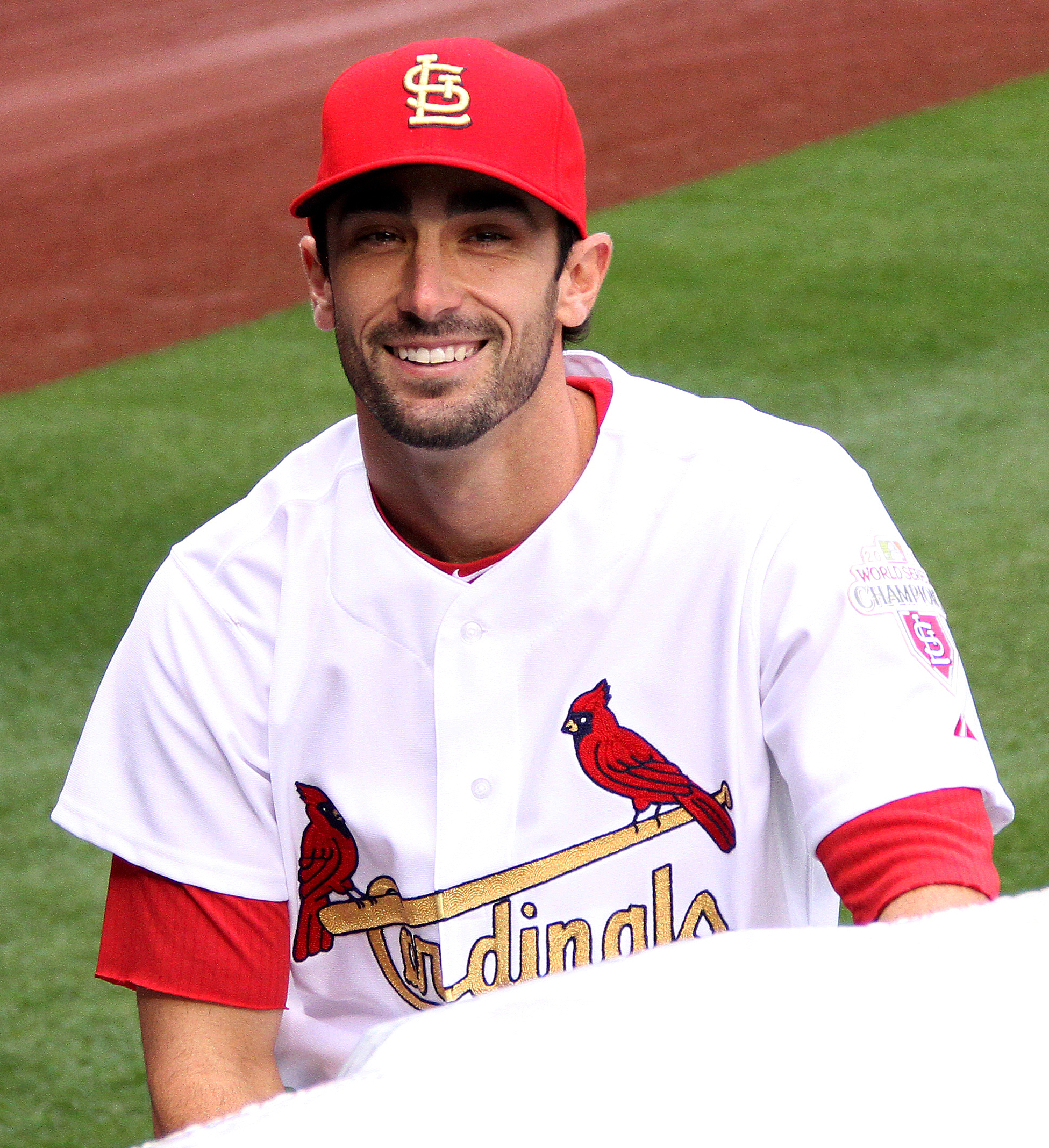
- Carpenter with the St. Louis Cardinals in 2012
- Infielder
- Born: November 26, 1985 (age 40); Galveston, Texas, U.S.
- Batted: Left Threw: Right

MLB debut
- June 4, 2011, for the St. Louis Cardinals

Last MLB appearance
- September 29, 2024, for the St. Louis Cardinals

MLB statistics
- Batting average: .259
- Home runs: 179
- Runs batted in: 659
- Stats at Baseball Reference

Teams
- St. Louis Cardinals (2011–2021); New York Yankees (2022); San Diego Padres (2023); St. Louis Cardinals (2024)

Career highlights and awards
- 3× All-Star (2013, 2014, 2016); Silver Slugger Award (2013)

Matthew Martin Lee Carpenter (born November 26, 1985) is an American former professional baseball infielder. He played 14 seasons in Major League Baseball (MLB) for the St. Louis Cardinals, New York Yankees, and San Diego Padres. A left-handed batter and right-handed thrower, Carpenter stands 6 feet 3 inches (1.91 m) and weighs 205 pounds (93 kg).

Since becoming a regular player in 2013, Carpenter spent considerable time at first base, second base and third base. The Cardinals selected him in the 13th round of the 2009 MLB draft from Texas Christian University (TCU). A three-time second-team All Mountain West Conference selectee, he broke TCU's school record for games played and at bats and is second in hits, doubles and walks. He was the Cardinals' organization Player of the Year in 2010. A three-time MLB All-Star Game selection, he became the first Silver Slugger Award winner at second base in Cardinals franchise history after leading the major leagues in hits, runs scored and doubles in 2013.

== Background ==
Carpenter was born in Galveston, Texas, on November 26, 1985, the son of Rick and Tammie Carpenter. The elder Carpenter is a former college baseball player turned high school coach. His mother played softball in her youth. The Carpenter family spent seven years in La Marque, Texas, where Rick Carpenter taught and coached at La Marque High School before moving to Fort Bend Dulles High School and eventually at Fort Bend Lawrence E. Elkins High School. There, Rick coached for another fifteen years. The school's baseball team won numerous championships, including nine at the district level, six regional, three state, and one national. He also coached three other major leaguers: James Loney, Kip Wells and Chad Huffman. Rick Carpenter also coached at Prosper High School near Dallas until he retired in 2019, winning a state championship in 2015. Carpenter's brother, Tyler, was a minor league baseball player in the New York Mets organization.

== Amateur career ==
At Elkins High School, Carpenter was a three-year first-team all-district performer and two-time all-state tournament team selection. He helped lead the team to a 35–1 record and the USA Today National Prep Championship in 2002, and was named the District Sophomore of the Year that year. His father, Rick Carpenter, was honored as the USA Today High School Baseball Coach of the Year. Matt was named a 2004 TPX second-team High School All-American. He holds the Elkins High School record for most career hits. One of his high school teammates was James Loney.

Carpenter attended Texas Christian University (TCU) and majored in communications. One of Carpenter's teammates at TCU was pitcher and fellow future major leaguer Jake Arrieta—who, after Carpenter became a St. Louis Cardinal, would later join the Chicago Cubs on the opposite end of the storied Cardinals–Cubs rivalry. In his freshman year as an athlete, Carpenter played 50 games and batted .289, 27 runs batted in (RBI), eight doubles (2B) and one home run (HR) with 11 multi-hit games and eight multiple-RBI games. The next season, he finished second on the team with a .349 average, one home run, and 36 RBIs in 62 games. He hit safely in 47 games and reached base in 56.

However, Carpenter's junior season was cut short after eight games due to a tearing a ligament in his elbow while throwing from first base. Tommy John surgery was necessary making him the first TCU position player to undergo a procedure much more common for pitchers to have. As a result he was granted a two-year medical redshirt (RS). Because his weight increased to 240 pounds (110 kg) and he was rehabilitating his elbow at an age more advanced than most players who are drafted, doubt lingered about Carpenter's future as a professional baseball player. While he was very disciplined as a player, his discipline off the field was poor, including his grades and physical conditioning. This contributed to his weight being higher than average. Carpenter attributes personal motivation and a speech from his head coach Jim Schlossnagle to getting him motivated to change his habits off the field. Thus, he applied the same dedication off the field as he did on the field. As a result Carpenter lost 40 pounds (18 kg).

While Carpenter was still rehabilitating during his junior year, major league outfielder Torii Hunter moved to Prosper, Texas, the same high school district where Rick Carpenter coached baseball. Hunter introduced himself to Carpenter because his son, Torii, Jr., would attend and play baseball there. The elder Hunter also met Matt Carpenter, who he eventually invited to train at the same gymnasium where he trained. It was an expensive facility, and at this point Carpenter was still in the minor leagues; he could not afford to pay for a membership at the gym. However Hunter covered the fees because he believed that Carpenter would take full advantage of the opportunity to train.

In Carpenter's RS-junior season, he played in all 63 games and was named second-team all-conference at third base. He finished with a .283 batting average, team-high 11 home runs and 46 RBI and ranked third on the team with 48 runs scored. His fifth-year senior season included a .333 batting average, .472 on-base percentage (OBP) and .662 slugging percentage (SLG) with 11 home runs. Along with Carpenter's increased performance, TCU's overall strong effort nearly led to a College World Series appearance. During his collegiate career, Carpenter broke school career records for games played (241) and at-bats (843), and finished second in hits (263), doubles (57) and walks (BB, with 150). He was named second-team All Mountain West Conference in 2006, 2008 and 2009.

== Professional career ==
=== Draft and minor leagues (2009–11) ===
The St. Louis Cardinals selected Carpenter in the 13th round of the 2009 Major League Baseball draft. Due to advanced age stemming from his redshirt senior season at TCU, he had little leverage in negotiations, and was forced to settle for a $1,000 bonus. He spent his first professional season with various A-level teams, including the Batavia Muckdogs, Quad Cities River Bandits, and the Palm Beach Cardinals Between the three clubs, he batted .283 with two home runs and 22 RBIs. In 2010, Carpenter returned to Palm Beach to begin the year; over 28 games, he hit .283 while also drawing 26 walks, placing his OBP at .441.

This resulted in a call-up to the Springfield Cardinals, with whom he played 105 games. With Springfield he batted .316 with 76 runs scored, 26 doubles, 12 home runs, 53 RBIs, and 11 stolen bases. He was chosen as a Topps' Double-A All-Star, Texas Mid-Season All-Star, and Texas Post-Season All-Star for his 2010 season. Carpenter also garnered the TCN/Scout.com Cardinals Minor League Player of the Year and Cardinals organization Player of the Year awards for 2010.

After his 2010 performance, Carpenter started to garner attention, and was expected to compete for one of the MLB Cardinals final roster openings the next spring training. Despite batting .333 with a .414 OBP and six extra base hits in spring training, he started the 2011 season in the minor leagues with the Triple-A Memphis Redbirds of Pacific Coast League (PCL). He spent 130 total games with Memphis, batting .300 with 12 home runs, seventy RBIs, 84 walks, a .417 on-base percentage, and a .483 slugging percentage. His OBP placed fourth in the PCL.

=== St. Louis Cardinals (2011–21) ===
==== Early major league career (2011–12) ====
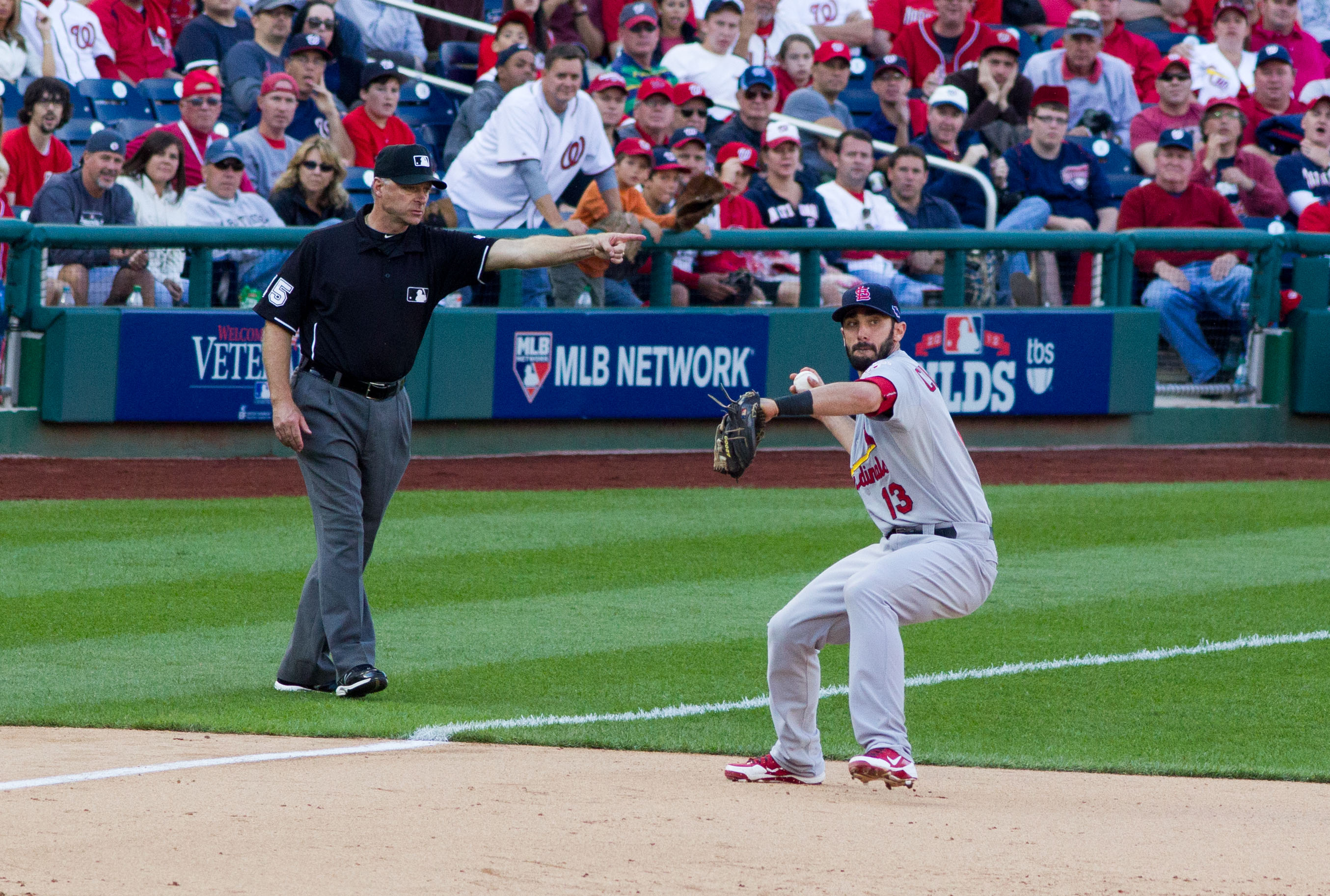
Carpenter throwing from third base during Game 3 of the 2012 NLDS against the Washington Nationals

Carpenter made his major league debut on June 4, 2011, starting at third base and batting seventh. During his brief stint in the majors that year, he played seven games, collecting one double, a .067 batting average and four walks. The Cardinals qualified for the postseason by clinching the wild card, but left him off the postseason roster. St. Louis became the World Series champions when they defeated the Texas Rangers. The Cardinals awarded Carpenter a championship ring for his contributions throughout the year.

After the 2011 season, the departures of Albert Pujols and Nick Punto — along with an injury to Allen Craig — opened up an opportunity for Carpenter to make the major league club. During the following spring training, he worked at first base and in the outfield to increase his versatility, where he served as a backup and spot starter in 2012 season. He made an early-season impact against the Chicago Cubs on April 15, driving in five runs with a home run and triple as the Cardinals won, 10–3.

Incurring a right flank strain on May 23, the team placed Carpenter on the disabled list (DL). The injury happened while swinging the bat for a double. At the time, he was batting .288 with three home runs and 20 RBIs in 39 games while filling in at first base for the injured Lance Berkman. In July, he made his first appearance at second base since turning professional. He played in 114 games for the season, tallying 340 plate appearances and batting .294 with six home runs, 46 RBIs, 22 doubles, a .365 OBP, and .463 SLG.

"When guys get hurt, especially a guy like Carlos,
sometimes that can be kind of a letdown
from an energy standpoint as a team. I wanted
to do something that would bring some life back."

— Carpenter on hitting a home run after replacing
an injured Carlos Beltrán in the 2012 NLCS

Carpenter hit his first career postseason home run on October 17, 2012, during Game 3 of the National League Championship Series (NLCS) against the San Francisco Giants. The two-run home run came with two out in the bottom of the third inning off Giants starter Matt Cain. Carpenter was inserted into the game from the bench to replace an injured Carlos Beltrán in the second inning. After a lengthy rain delay, the Cardinals won the game 3–1 to take a two-game-to-one series lead in the NLCS. However the Giants won the NLCS in seven games on their way to becoming the World Series champions.

==== First All-Star selection (2013) ====
Uncertain of where the club would find adequate offensive production from second base, the Cardinals advised Carpenter to work out there in the off-season prior to 2013. He had played mainly third base and had totaled just 18 total innings at second base since the Cardinals drafted him — all during the 2012 season after his major league call-up. After his tryout in spring training, he made the team as the starting second baseman.

With Rafael Furcal out for the season due to injury, and Jon Jay starting the season slowly, the Cardinals clamored for productivity from their leadoff hitters. Manager Mike Matheny moved Carpenter into the leadoff spot midway through April in spite of him lacking the speed sought after for that post in the lineup. He responded by proving to be an all-around hitter, gaining his first All-Star selection at Citi Field with 25 doubles, 65 runs scored, and two 12-game hitting streaks at the All-Star break.

With his 54th double on September 21, Carpenter broke Stan Musial's six decade-old franchise record for doubles (Musial's 53 came in 1953) by a left-handed batter. He finished the season leading the Major Leagues in hits (199), doubles (55), and runs (126), while batting .318. He also finished in the top ten in the NL in batting average, on-base percentage (.392), total bases (301), singles (126), triples (seven), walks (72), and adjusted OPS (143), among others. Among NL leadoff hitters, he finished second in OBP to Shin-Soo Choo's .423.

Despite his stellar regular season, Carpenter batted only .203 in the postseason. Against the Pittsburgh Pirates in the NLDS, he started slowly, managing just one hit in 19 at-bats (.053). He improved his batting average to .261 against the Los Angeles Dodgers in the NLCS. In the fourth inning of Game 6, Carpenter faced Dodgers ace Clayton Kershaw and lined a double to right field to end an 11-pitch at bat and ignite a four-run outburst. They eventually won, 9–0, securing a trip to the World Series. Carpenter batted .296 in the World Series against the Boston Red Sox. However, in the ninth inning in Game 6 against Boston closer Koji Uehara, he struck out for the final out, resulting in the Cardinals' eighth and most recent World Series loss.

The following November, in earning his first Silver Slugger Award, Carpenter also became the first winner at second base in Cardinals history. He finished fourth in the NL Most Valuable Player Award balloting. He was also selected as the team finalist for Heart & Hustle Award; Boston's Dustin Pedroia was the winner. The club then signed Carpenter to a six-year, $52 million extension to run through 2019 on March 6, 2014. Included was an option for 2020 worth $18.5 million. General manager John Mozeliak cited his work ethic as another factor in Carpenter getting the extension.

==== Second All-Star selection (2014) ====
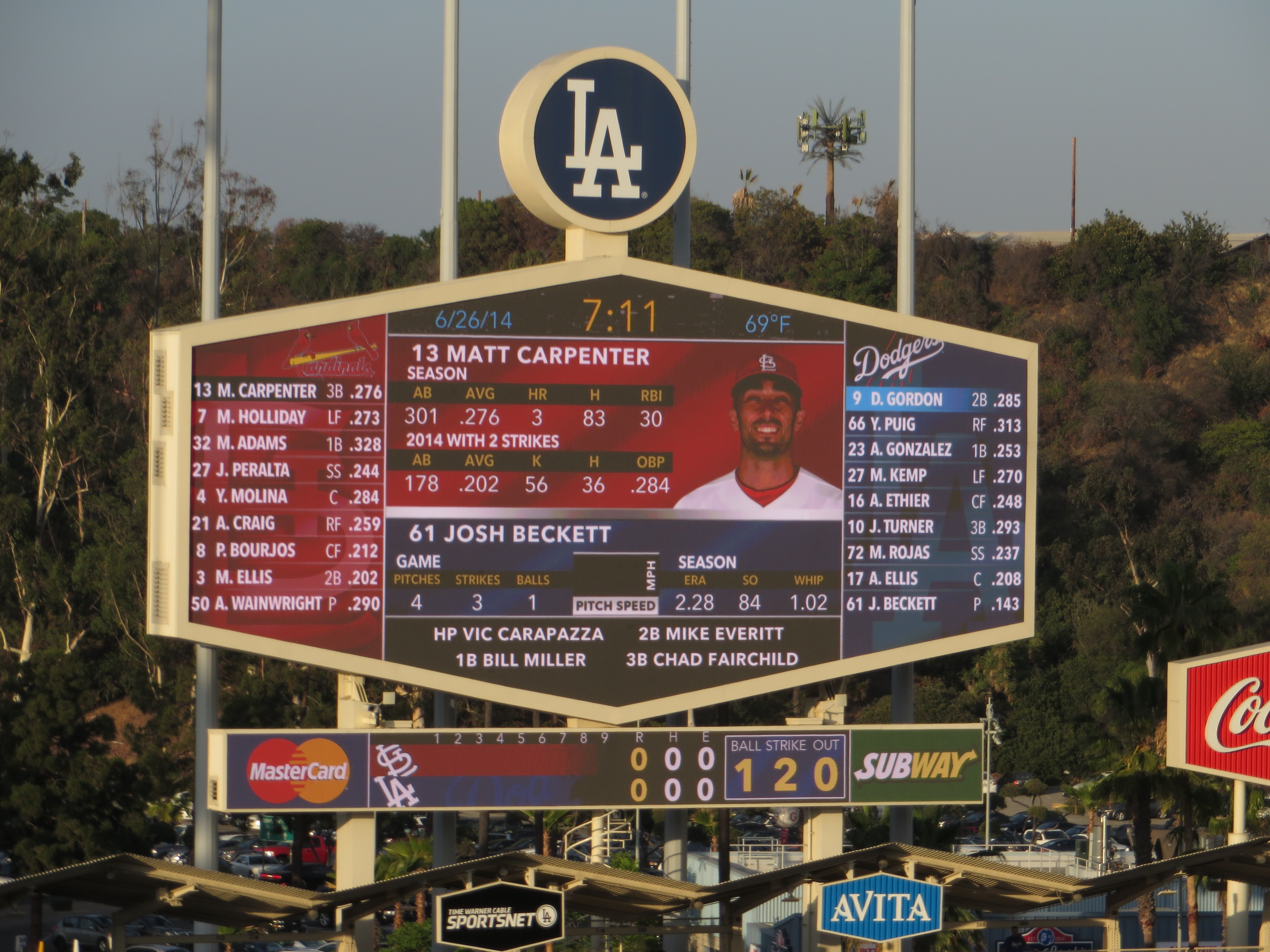
Matt Carpenter on the scoreboard of Dodger Stadium in 2014

With second base prospect Kolten Wong viewed as major league-ready, Carpenter moved back to his customary position of third base in 2014. He continued as the Cardinals leadoff hitter. He started the season slowly, batting .264 in April with three doubles and one home run. His productivity returned in May, when he batted .307 with 10 doubles. However on May 15, his batting average had dropped to .256 with a .315 SLG. From May 18 to June 1, he hit safely in 14 consecutive games and collected a combined 24 hits in 60 at-bats for a .400 batting average.

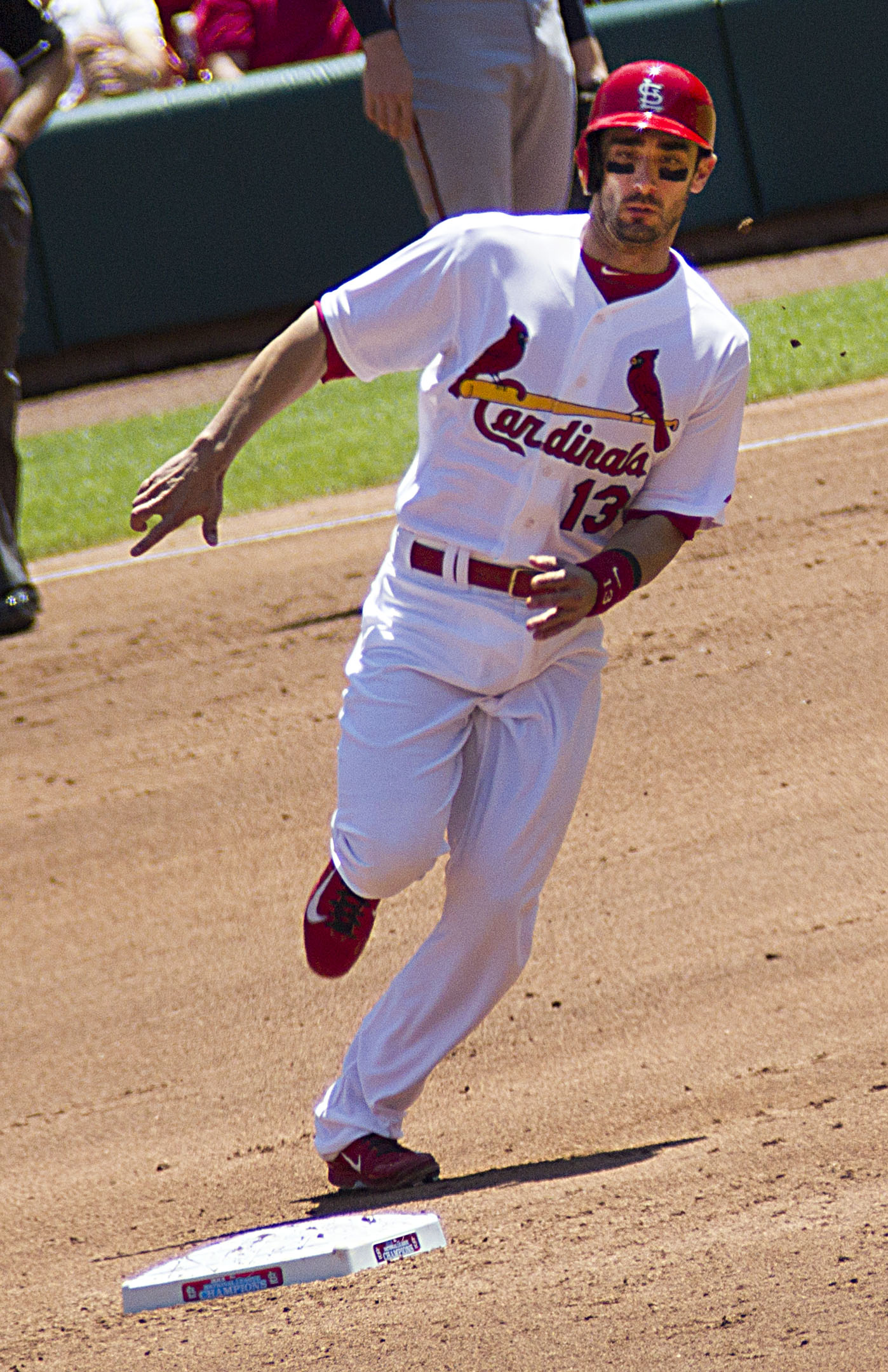
Carpenter running the bases in 2014

In a June 4 matchup against the Kansas City Royals, Carpenter raked five hits in five at-bats to raise his batting average to a season-high .307. His double in the eleventh inning provided the game-winning RBI in a 5–2 victory. It was the first five-hit game for the Cardinals since Ryan Ludwick's on September 4, 2009. Carpenter finished that game having reached base in 10 consecutive plate appearances. The five hits brought him into a tie for the NL lead in hits (73), and until that point he led NL leadoff hitters in runs (40) and BB (33). After first-half results through July 6 including a .282 batting average, four home runs, 32 RBI, and a .375 OBP, he was selected to his second All-Star Game at Target Field in Minneapolis, Minnesota.

For the season, Carpenter batted .271 with a .375 OBP, .375 SLG, 33 doubles, eight home runs, 59 RBIs, 99 runs scored and 95 walks in 158 games. He finished third in the NL in runs scored and eighth in OBP, and led the league in walks. His average of 4.36 pitches per plate appearance was far above the MLB average of 3.82. According to a computerized tracking system, he also led the league in pitches taken that were erroneously pronounced strikes. In spite of the significant drop in batting average from the season before, his increased walk total helped him produce an OBP of no less than .362 in each month of 2014.

In the NLDS against the Dodgers, the Cardinals again faced Kershaw in Game 1. Carpenter's home run against him in the sixth inning stopped a string of 14 consecutive batters the lefty ace had retired. In the following at bat opposing Kershaw in the seventh inning, he found himself in an 0–2 count, but battled eight pitches for a bases-clearing double that gave the Cardinals a 7–6 lead. The Cardinals won 10–9.

Carpenter is "the epitome of a professional grinder. ...
This guy's as tough an out as there is in the National League,
especially when the stakes are raised."

— Dodgers catcher A. J. Ellis on Carpenter, who
successfully doubled off Clayton Kershaw in both the
2013 and 2014 postseasons after lengthy at bats

In Game 2, Carpenter's second home run of the series tied the game late, but the Dodgers prevailed 3–2. In the first three games of the Cardinals-Dodgers playoff, Carpenter knocked in seven runs with two doubles, two solo homers, and a two-run homer. By hitting a home run and a double in each of the first three games of the NLDS, he became the first player to do so in the postseason. Between the NLDS and NLCS against the Giants, Carpenter hit safely ten times in 26 at bats with four home runs, four doubles, and eight RBI.

==== 2015 ====
A sample of Carpenter's batting stroke against the Arizona Diamondbacks in 2015

Showing initial great success in early at-bats in 2015, Carpenter's first home run was also a game-winner. Deciding a 7–5 margin, the home run occurred in the 11th inning of the April 12 contest against Cincinnati. During the Cardinals' first homestand of the season, he doubled four times in a six at-bat span on April 17–18 against the Reds. On April 17, he scored a run when he somersaulted over catcher Brayan Peña; traditionally runners attempt to score with a direct collision with the catcher.

Including his fifth career leadoff home run against Cincinnati on April 19, Carpenter recorded his seventh straight two-hit game. It was the seventh consecutive game with an extra base hit and it was just the 37th occasion in the century in which a Cardinal achieved this feat. Further, the seven consecutive multi-hit games with at least one extra base hit in each tied the Cardinals' franchise record which Ripper Collins originally set in 1935. That same streak was the longest in the Major Leagues since Paul Molitor achieved the same as a member of the Brewers in 1991. From April 12–19, Carpenter netted a .480 average, .880 SLG, seven doubles, one home run, and five RBI. His 22 total bases led the NL. MLB subsequently named him to his first NL Player of the Week Award for that period. Carpenter continued his extra-base hit surge. He ripped his second leadoff home run of the season against Washington on April 22, and the next day he lined the first pitch of the game off Max Scherzer for a double.

Matheny moved Carpenter to the number two spot in the batting order in late April. He continued a strong hitting effort. His second game-winner of the season was a sacrifice fly against Pittsburgh on May 2, giving the Cardinals a walk-off 2–1 win in the 11th inning. He left early the next day due to lightheadedness. On May 6 against the Chicago Cubs, his three-run home run tied the score as St. Louis triumphed, 7–4. It was a four-RBI game, giving him 20 in his team's first 26 games.

He was withheld from a weekend series against Pittsburgh May 8–10 due to "extreme fatigue", after team physicians diagnosed dehydration and an accelerated heart rate. On May 24 against the Royals, his eighth home run off Yordano Ventura matched his previous season's total. It was also Carpenter's 500th career hit and 300th career run scored. In the month of June, he batted .190 with four doubles, no home runs and 10 RBI.

After being moved down in the order, Carpenter then endured a three-month slump in which he batted .216. He returned to the lead off position on July 30 for his first career multi-home run game. He also had four hits, four runs scored and four RBI, and was instrumental in a 9–8 home walk-off victory over the Colorado Rockies. Carpenter's ground rule double in the bottom of the ninth started the decisive rally. He hit five home runs from July 30 to August 5. In August, Baseball America rated Carpenter as having the third-best strike zone judgment in the NL. Carpenter reached 20 home runs for the first time in his career on August 30 in a 7–5 win over the Giants. He led the National League in doubles (44) for a second time, and the Cardinals in home runs (28) and RBI (84). He also finished in the top ten in the National League in slugging percentage, on-base plus slugging, runs scored, total bases, walks, home runs and strikeouts. During his time batting second, he batted .225 with six home runs and 33 RBI. As the leadoff hitter, he batted .322 with 22 home runs, fifty RBIs and a 1.022 OPS. He finished 12th in the MVP balloting.

==== Third All-Star selection (2016) ====
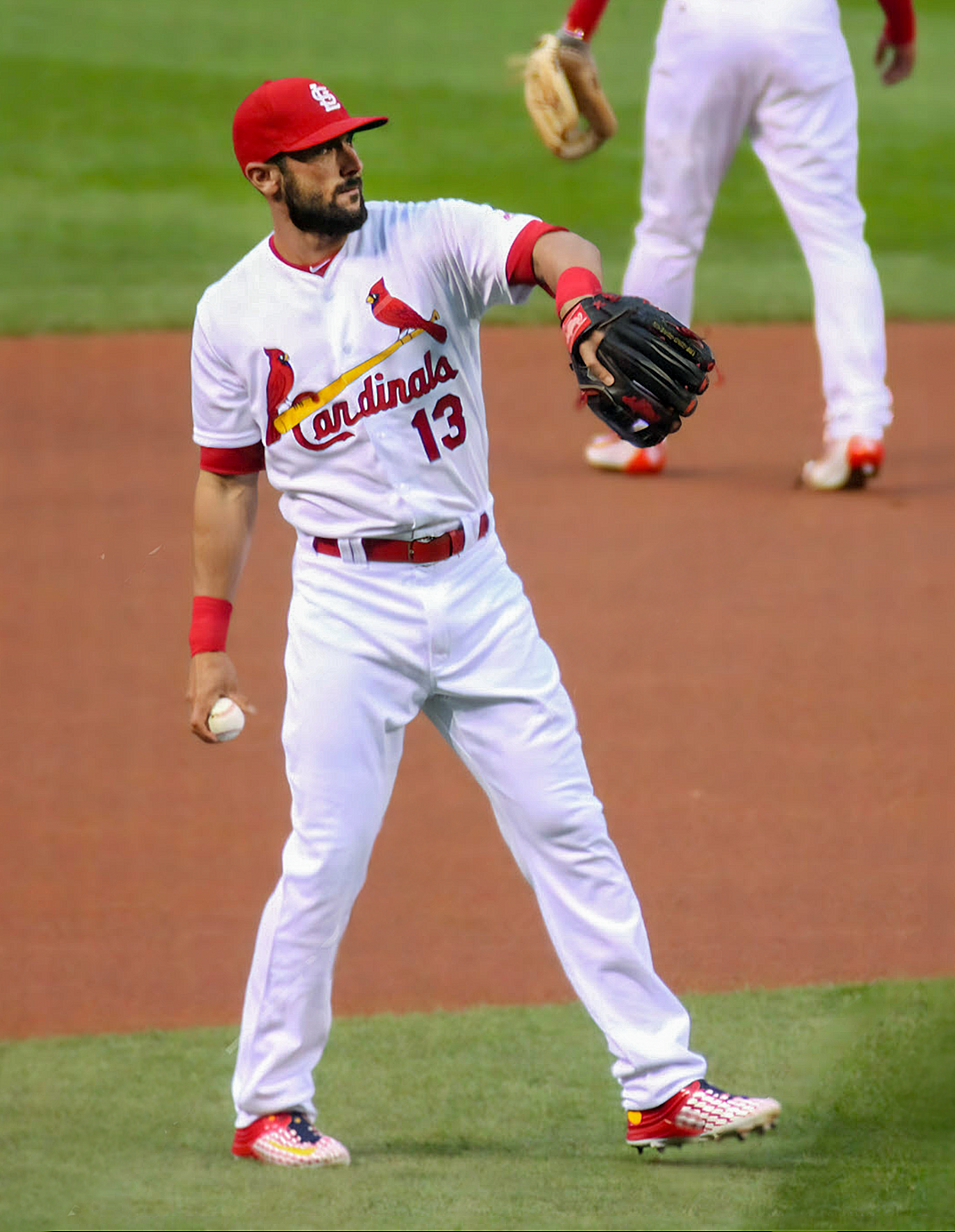
Matt Carpenter in 2016.

Carpenter's first career walk-off home run came on May 7, 2016, in a 6–4 win over Pittsburgh. On May 19, he established a new career-high six RBI in a game at Busch Stadium against the Colorado Rockies, with two doubles and his ninth home run of the season in 13–7 win. From 2013 through May 2016, he led all major league leadoff hitters in hits, runs, home runs and RBI. MLB named Carpenter the NL Player of the Week on June 6 after batting .560 with five doubles. He generated consecutive four-hit games against Milwaukee on May 30−31, then six hits in a three games series versus San Francisco, leading all of MLB with a .577 OBP and 10 runs. He produced a .920 SLG and 1.497 OPS. After the series against the Giants, he moved back to second base to accommodate the return of Jhonny Peralta from the DL.

After leading the NL in OPS (1.008) for the first half of the season, Carpenter was selected as a reserve on July 5 for the All-Star Game at Petco Park in San Diego. The Cardinals placed him on the 15-day DL on July 7 with an abdominal oblique strain. After returning from the DL, he played in 51 games, batting .229, having a .410 slugging percentage, and a .726 OPS. He indicated he was still unable to swing properly after returning from the oblique injury. He completed the season having appeared in 129 games, and batting .271 with a career-high .885 OPS, twenty home runs, 36 doubles, and 68 RBIs. His 81 walks placed seventh and 135 adjusted OPS+ eighth in the league. On defense, he made at least 40 appearances each at first base, second base, and third base.

==== 2017 ====
The Cardinals made Carpenter their primary first baseman to begin the 2017 season. He served a one-game suspension on April 25 of a series opener versus the Toronto Blue Jays for having bumped umpire John Tumpane two days prior, when he had been ejected for arguing a pair of called strikes in the seventh inning. Carpenter hit a walk-off grand slam, and the first grand slam of his career, in the 11th inning of an 8−4 victory, in the first game of a split double-header versus the Blue Jays on April 27. He homered on May 14 versus Arrieta, then with the Cubs, to end an 0-for-28 and nine-strikeout slump in their matchups. On May 17 versus the Boston Red Sox, Carpenter's sacrifice fly to shortstop Xander Bogaerts—the third of his career to the shortstop position—made him the only player since at least 1970 to accomplish the feat.

After experiencing tightness in his right quadriceps on July 23 versus the Cubs, Carpenter exited the game. He was removed from the lineup on August 23 versus the San Diego Padres due to an illness. In the aftermath of Hurricane Harvey flooding Greater Houston in late August, Carpenter announced that he would donate $10,000 to relief efforts for every homer he hit for the rest of the season. At the time, he had hit 17 in 121 games. Both Wainwright and the Cardinals offered to match his pledge. On September 5, an MRI of his shoulder revealed inflammation without significant damage. Carpenter walked a career-high 109 times in 2017, ranking second in the NL. For the season, he had the lowest ground ball percentage of all major league hitters (26.9%). Over 145 games for the 2017 season, Carpenter batted .241/.384/.451 with 23 home runs and 69 RBIs.

While batting leadoff, Carpenter continued to produce at an elite level: in 2017, he attained a .418 OBP. Over 2,191 career plate appearances through 2017 while leading off, he slashed .291/.391/.487 with park-adjusted runs created (WRC+) of 142, or 42 percent above the league average. However as Matheny continued to utilize him in other spots in the batting order to attempt to increase the overall productivity of the Cardinals' lineup, the results were significantly inferior. Over 1,044 plate appearances, Carpenter went.243/.343/.395 with 104 WRC+. Because Carpenter did not permanently bat as the leadoff hitter, widespread debate and questioning of Matheny's decisions ensued.

Following the season, an MRI on Carpenter's shoulder again revealed inflammation without further damage. It was determined that surgery was not necessary and an offseason of rest would be sufficient for recuperation.

==== 2018 ====
The 2018 season commenced with Carpenter laboring through one of the deepest hitting slumps of his career: through May 15, he batted .140 with a .558 OPS, ranking 157th of 163 hitters who had qualified for the batting title. However that period of time was not without highlights for Carpenter. On April 10, he hit a walk-off home run in the 11th inning versus the Brewers, capping a 5−3 victory. He hit his 100th career home run on May 1, a game-tying hit in the ninth inning versus Joakim Soria of the Chicago White Sox, which the Cardinals eventually won, 3−2. On June 26, Carpenter became the first player in Cardinals history to attain five hits, five runs scored, and two home runs in one game, in an 11–2 victory over ace Corey Kluber and the Cleveland Indians. From May 15 until July 20 — a span of 214 at bats — Carpenter hit 20 home runs, 24 doubles, and .738 SLG. Meanwhile his improved performance garnered nomination as one of five finalists for the NL Final Vote to play in the All-Star Game, which the Brewers' Jesús Aguilar won.

During a matchup on July 20 at Wrigley Field versus the Chicago Cubs, Carpenter's three home runs and two doubles contributed to him tying or setting multiple records, while amassing all five hits and seven RBI within the first six innings of an 18−5 rout. He became the first player in Cardinal franchise history, and second in Major League history, to hit three home runs and two doubles in a single game, following Kris Bryant of the Cubs. One of Carpenter's home runs was leading off the game, passing Lou Brock for the franchise record with five in one season. Carpenter also tied Mark Whiten's club record with 16 total bases, which he generated in his landmark four home run game in 1993. Carpenter was removed from the game after the sixth inning. On July 22, he was named NL Player of the Week after batting .529 with six home runs and a 1.706 slugging percentage during St. Louis' five-game set in Chicago.

On July 31, 2018, at Busch Stadium versus the Colorado Rockies Carpenter hit his 22nd career leadoff home run, breaking Brock's franchise record for most career leadoff home runs. Meanwhile, Carpenter won his first career Player of the Month Award, having hit a major league-leading 11 home runs in July. He also batted .333/.447/.774, raising his season OPS from .871 to .960. He later set a career high in home runs with 29 before being named Player of the Week again on August 6. That week's production included 11-for-35, four home runs, seven runs scored, two doubles and eight walks, while extending an on-base streak to 24 games. His resurgent performance gained national attention as an MVP candidate, having established himself as the league leader in doubles, home runs, slugging percentage, OPS, and Fangraphs WAR in early August. However, Carpenter faltered in September, batting just .170 and hitting only one home run.

Carpenter finished the 2018 campaign batting .257 with 36 home runs and 81 RBI in 156 games. He had the highest percentage of hard-hit batted balls in the majors (49.0%), and for the second season in a row, he had the lowest ground ball percentage of all major league hitters (26.4%). Over 564 at bats, the entire season elapsed with Carpenter having avoided grounding into a double play, making him the first Cardinal to achieve the feat with at least 550 at-bats.

==== 2019 ====
On April 10, 2019, Carpenter signed a two-year, $39 million contract extension to remain with the Cardinals. The deal included a vesting option for 2022 worth $18.5 million by reaching 1,100 plate appearances in 2019–20.

From September 9, 2017, to April 14, 2019, Carpenter hit 43 home runs between grounding into double plays, a record until surpassed by Byron Buxton in 2022.

Carpenter struggled to begin the 2019 season. Through July 2, he was hitting .216/.325/.381 with ten home runs, and was placed on the injured list with a lower back strain that same day. He was activated on July 11, but placed back on the IL after fouling a ball off of his foot. He was reinstated from the IL on August 4. Overall, Carpenter hit .226/.334/.392 with 15 home runs and 46 RBIs over 129 games.

==== 2020 ====
In the pandemic-shortened 60-game season in 2020, Carpenter appeared in 50 games, with new career-lows in his entire slash line of .186/.325/.314.

==== 2021 ====
Carpenter entered the 2021 season as a backup and bench player after the Cardinals acquired third baseman Nolan Arenado and announced that Tommy Edman would be the primary second baseman. On May 15, 2021, in the bottom of the 7th inning against the San Diego Padres, Carpenter made his first appearance pitching. He gave up an RBI single to Austin Nola, before getting Brian O’Grady to pop out to end the inning. For the 2021 season, Carpenter batted .169/.305/.275 with three home runs and 21 RBIs over 207 at-bats.

Following the season's end, the Cardinals declined Carpenter's option for the 2022 season, making him a free agent for the first time in his career.

Frustrated with how his tenure in St. Louis ended, Carpenter sought advice in the off-season from Joey Votto and former teammate Matt Holliday on how to revitalize his career. Holliday, a hitting coach for Oklahoma State at the time, invited Carpenter to the school’s facility in Stillwater to both mentor the team and refine his swing. Carpenter also visited the Marucci Sports facility in Baton Rouge, Louisiana where he was fitted for a new bat.

=== Texas Rangers (2022) ===
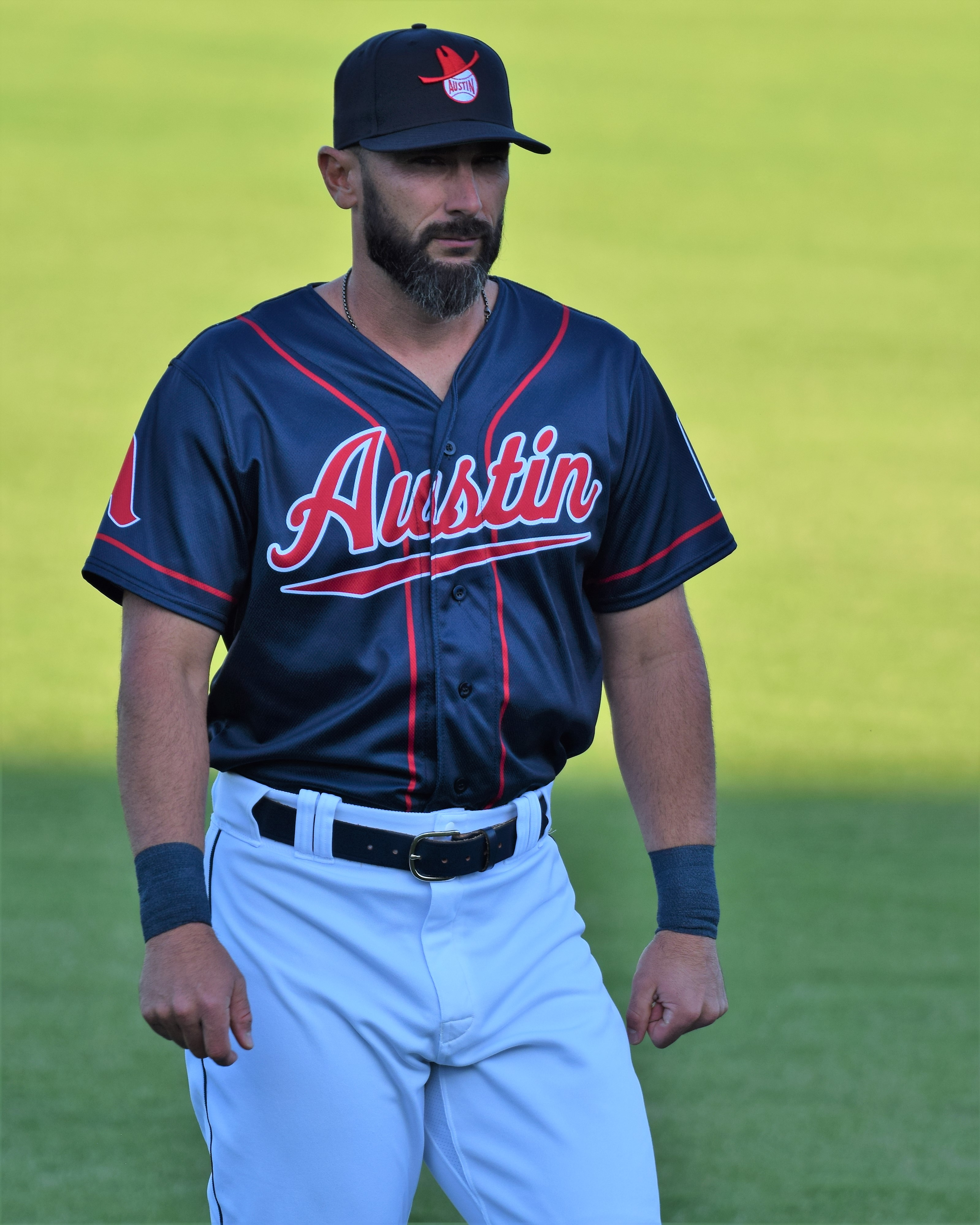
Carpenter with the Round Rock Express in 2022

On March 18, 2022, Carpenter signed a minor-league contract with the Texas Rangers with an invitation to major-league spring training. Carpenter did not make the Rangers' Opening Day roster, and he accepted an assignment with the Triple-A Round Rock Express. On May 19, the Rangers released Carpenter after he batted .275 with six home runs over 21 games.

=== New York Yankees (2022) ===
On May 26, 2022, the New York Yankees signed Carpenter to a major-league contract. On June 12, Carpenter became the first Yankee to hit six or more home runs in his first 10 games with the team. That day, he tied his career high with seven RBI, while hitting two home runs with a double and a walk to lead a defeat of the Chicago Cubs, 18–4. Carpenter broke a team record for home runs in a player's first 30 games with the Yankees, hitting two three-run home runs against the Red Sox on July 16; his total of 13 homers broke the team record previously set by Kevin Maas in 1990 and Glenallen Hill in 2000. He became the first Yankees outfielder with seven RBIs in a game against the Red Sox since Joe DiMaggio accomplished the feat in 1940.

During his tenure on the Yankees, Carpenter served as a utility player, far exceeding offensive expectations from manager Aaron Boone. On July 18, Carpenter was named AL Player of the Week, succeeding teammate Aaron Judge. On August 8, Carpenter fouled a pitch off his left foot, breaking it and putting him on the injured list for an estimated 6–8 weeks. Carpenter returned from the injured list for the 2022 postseason, going 1-for-12 with nine strikeouts and zero walks over six games played.

=== San Diego Padres (2023) ===
On December 20, 2022, Carpenter signed a one-year, $6.5 million contract with the San Diego Padres that included a $5 million player option for a second year. He hit .176 in 76 games for the Padres in 2023 with five homers and 31 RBI. He exercised his player option for the 2024 season.

On December 15, 2023, the Padres traded Carpenter and Ray Kerr with cash considerations to the Atlanta Braves in exchange for Drew Campbell. He was released by the Braves three days later.

=== St. Louis Cardinals (2024) ===
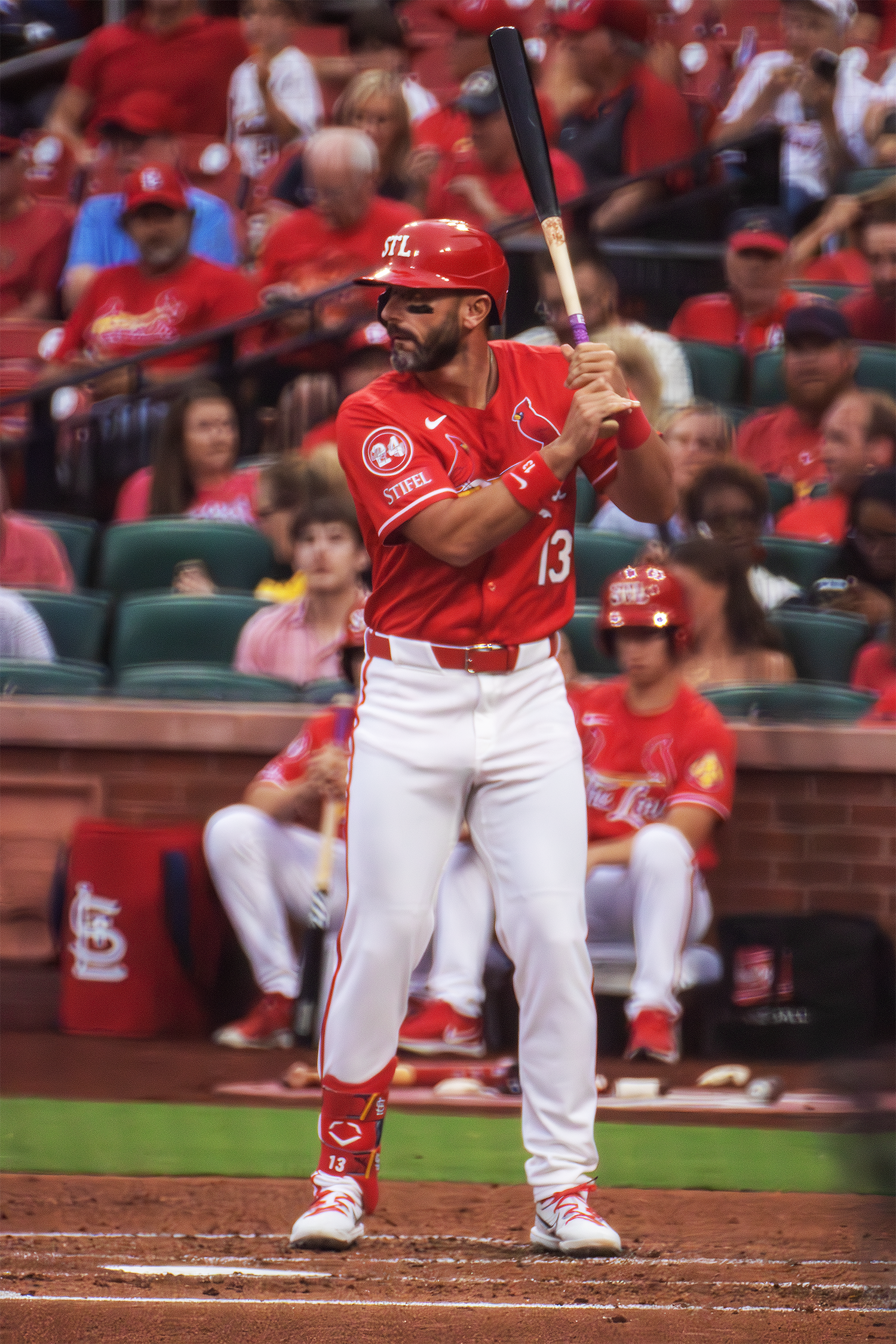
Carpenter in 2024

On January 19, 2024, Carpenter signed a one-year contract to return with the Cardinals. In 59 appearances for St. Louis, Carpenter batted .234/.314/.372 with four home runs and 15 RBI.

On May 14, 2025, Carpenter announced his retirement from professional baseball on a podcast.

== Awards and accomplishments ==
Championships earned or shared
Title	Times	Dates	Ref
National League champion	1	2013	

Awards received
Name of award	Times	Dates (Ranking or event)	Ref
Major leagues
Baseball America National League "Best Strike Zone Judgment"	1	2015 (3rd)	
Major League Baseball All-Star	3	2013, 2014, 2016	
National League Player of the Month	1	2018 July	
National League Player of the Week	4	April 19, 2015; June 6, 2016; July 23, 2018; August 6, 2018	
Silver Slugger Award at second base	1	2013	
Minor leagues
All-Star	3	Texas League (2010 mid-season, 2010 post-season); Topps' Double-A (2010)	
St. Louis Cardinals Organization Player of the Year	1	2010	
Texas League Player of the Week	2	July 25, 2010; August 10, 2010	

Statistical achievements

Note: Through 2015 season. Per Baseball-Reference.com.

National League statistical leader
Category	Times	Dates
Bases on balls leader	1	2014
Doubles leader	2	2013, 2015
Hits leader	1	2013
Plate appearances leader	1	2014
Runs scored leader	1	2013

National League top-ten ranking
Category	Times	Seasons	Category	Times	Seasons
Adjusted on-base plus slugging	2	2013, 2015	On-base percentage	2	2013, 2014
Bases on balls	3	2013–15	On-base plus slugging percentage	1	2015
Batting average	1	2013	Runs scored	3	2013–15
Doubles	2	2013, 2015	Slugging percentage	1	2015
Extra base hits	2	2013, 2015	Strikeouts	1	2015
Games played	2	2013, 2014	Times on base	3	2013–15
Hits	1	2013	Triples	1	2013
Home runs	1	2015	Total bases	2	2013, 2015

== Personal life ==
When he was in high school, Matt Carpenter was given a framed poster of Lance Berkman, his childhood hero and also his teammate from 2011–12. The poster was a gift from his now-wife, Mackenzie (Detmore) Carpenter. Carpenter and Mackenzie attended the same High School, where they began to date. After becoming engaged in May 2011, the couple were married on December 10, 2011, in Missouri City, Texas. Jake Arrieta served as a groomsman. The Carpenters' first child, a daughter, was born May 25, 2016. Mackenzie gave birth to their second child, a boy, on November 20, 2017.

Carpenter is a Christian. He has said, “There was so much relief in [surrendering my life to Christ]. From that point on, literally, like it changed me. … The game of baseball I have no control over. The game of life I have no control over. All I have is my faith. If you’re looking for some solid ground or some rock to hold onto, there’s only one way and that’s through Him.” When Carpenter had elbow surgery at Texas Christian University, he stated that he leaned on his faith during that tough time. "But when you have something taken away from you, it really opens up your eyes to what’s really important, and it took me leaning on my faith to get to the point where I could play the game again."

Known for being one of the few major leaguers to not wear batting gloves during games, Carpenter has said that he has not worn them in organized baseball except for one game during college in Colorado Springs while visiting Air Force. His right palm shows the effects of not wearing gloves; he has many calluses and small cuts.

In the aftermath of Hurricane Harvey flooding the Greater Houston area in 2017, Carpenter pledged to donate $10,000 to the flooding victims for every home run he hit the remainder of the season.

== See also ==
- List of Major League Baseball annual runs scored leaders
- List of Major League Baseball annual doubles leaders
- List of Major League Baseball doubles records
- St. Louis Cardinals award winners and league leaders

Awards and achievements
Preceded by Derek Jeter	Major League Baseball annual hits leader 2013 (with Adrián Beltré)	Succeeded by Jose Altuve
Preceded by Paul Goldschmidt	National League Player of the Month; July 2018	Succeeded by Justin Turner
