= Billy Petrick =

American baseball player (born 1984)

- Relief pitcher
- Born: April 29, 1984 (age 42); Kankakee, Illinois, U.S.
- Batted: Right Threw: Right

MLB debut
- June 27, 2007, for the Chicago Cubs

Last appearance
- July 26, 2008, for the Chicago Cubs

MLB statistics
- Win–loss record: 0–0
- Earned run average: 7.45
- Strikeouts: 6
- Stats at Baseball Reference

Teams
- Chicago Cubs (2007)

William John Petrick III (born April 29, 1984) is an American former professional baseball pitcher. He played in Major League Baseball (MLB) for the Chicago Cubs.

== Career ==
=== Chicago Cubs ===
Petrick was drafted by the Chicago Cubs in the third round, with the 93rd overall selection, of the 2002 Major League Baseball draft.

Petrick made his major league debut on June 27, 2007, against the Colorado Rockies; he would give up two earned runs in two innings.

=== Windy City ThunderBolts ===
On February 13, 2009, Petrick signed with the Windy City ThunderBolts of the Frontier League. Petrick appeared in 11 games on the season while recovering from an injury. He went 1-0 with a 2.13 ERA in 12.2 innings, racking up three saves and 15 strikeouts while walking only three.

=== Later career ===
On April 21, 2010, the Joliet JackHammers acquired Petrick from the ThunderBolts.

Petrick signed with the Amarillo Thunderheads of the American Association of Independent Professional Baseball for the 2015 season.

== Personal life ==
Petrick's brother, Zach, is also a professional baseball player.
