= Moisés Gómez (baseball) =

Venezuelan baseball player (born 1998)

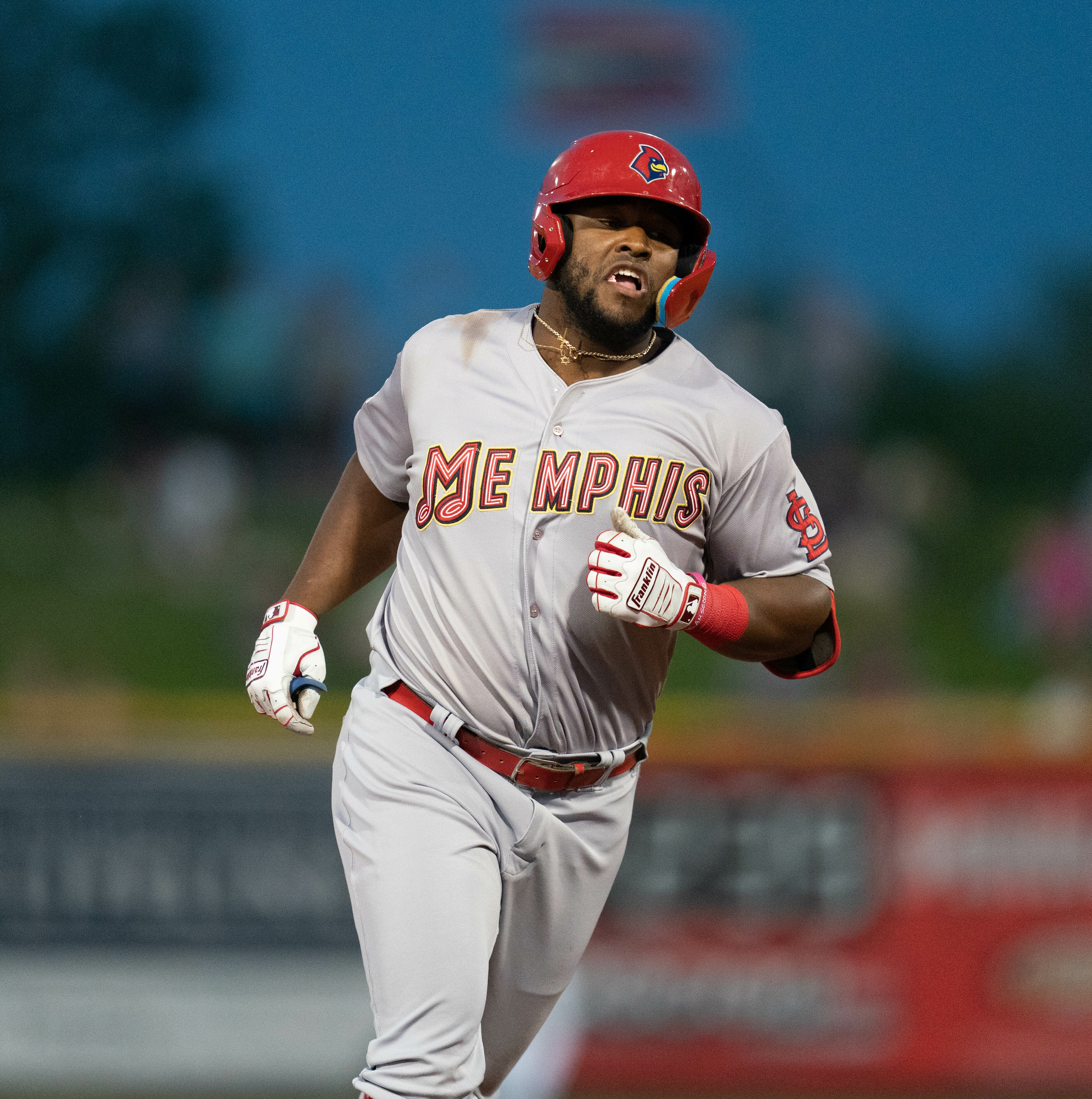
- Gómez with the Memphis Redbirds in 2023

Leones de Yucatán – No. 35
- Outfielder
- Born: August 27, 1998 (age 27); Caracas, Venezuela
- Bats: Right Throws: Right

Moisés Manuel Gómez (born August 27, 1998) is a Venezuelan professional baseball outfielder for the Leones de Yucatán of the Mexican League.

== Career ==
=== Tampa Bay Rays ===
Gómez was signed by the Tampa Bay Rays as an international free agent on April 28, 2015, and made his professional debut with the Venezuelan Summer League Rays. He spent the following year with the rookie–level Gulf Coast League Rays, posting a .220/.273/.327 batting line with one home run and 10 RBI. Gómez remained in rookie ball with the Princeton Rays in 2017, batting .275/.328/.398 with five home runs, 28 RBI, and 10 stolen bases.

Gómez spent the 2018 season with the Single–A Bowling Green Hot Rods, hitting .280/.328/.503 with career–highs in home runs (19) and RBI (82). He played in 119 games for the High–A Charlotte Stone Crabs in 2019, slashing .220/.297/.402 with 16 home runs and 66 RBI. Gómez did not play in a game in 2020 due to the cancellation of the minor league season because of the COVID-19 pandemic.

Gómez returned to action in 2021 with the Double–A Montgomery Biscuits, playing in 76 games and hitting .171/.256/.309 with eight home runs and 23 RBI. On October 22, 2021, Gómez asked for his release so he could play in a winter baseball league in Venezuela.

=== St. Louis Cardinals ===
On November 5, 2021, before he could begin winter play, Gómez was signed to a minor league contract by the St. Louis Cardinals. He opened the 2022 season with the Double–A Springfield Cardinals, batting .321 with 23 home runs and 54 RBI over 60 games. He was promoted to the Triple–A Memphis Redbirds in late June. Over 60 games with Memphis to end the season, he hit .266 with 16 home runs and 40 RBI. Between both teams, he finished with a combined .294 batting average with 39 home runs and 94 RBI; his total of 39 home runs for the season led the minor leagues and he was awarded the Joe Bauman Home Run Award. He was also awarded the Texas League Most Valuable Player Award for his performance with Springfield and the Cardinals Minor League Player of the Year.

On November 7, 2022, the Cardinals selected Gomez's contract to the 40-man roster, protecting him from the Rule 5 draft. Gómez was optioned to Triple–A Memphis to begin the 2023 season and spent the whole season with the team. Over 131 games, he batted .232 with 30 home runs and 79 RBI. Gómez was designated for assignment on January 29, 2024 and sent outright to Triple-A Memphis on February 3. In 41 games for Memphis, he batted .208/.284/.299 with three home runs and 11 RBI. Gómez was released by the Cardinals organization on July 29.

=== Kansas City Monarchs ===
On August 17, 2024, Gómez signed with the Kansas City Monarchs of the American Association of Professional Baseball. In 16 games for the Monarchs, he batted .283/.303/.533 with four home runs, 14 RBI, and one stolen base.

=== San Diego Padres ===
On December 13, 2024, Gómez signed a minor league contract with the San Diego Padres. He spent the 2025 season with the Double-A San Antonio Missions, also playing in one game for the Triple-A El Paso Chihuahuas; in 110 appearances for San Antonio, he batted .231/.304/.363 with seven home runs, 46 RBI, and nine stolen bases. Gómez elected free agency following the season on November 6, 2025.

=== Pericos de Puebla ===
On December 8, 2025, Gómez signed with the Pericos de Puebla of the Mexican League. In 52 appearances for the Pericos, he batted .222/.282/.526 with 15 home runs and 39 RBI. On July 14, 2026, Gómez was released by Puebla.

=== Leones de Yucatán ===
On July 17, 2026, Gómez signed with the Leones de Yucatán of the Mexican League.
