= Zach Petrick =

American professional baseball pitcher (born 1989)

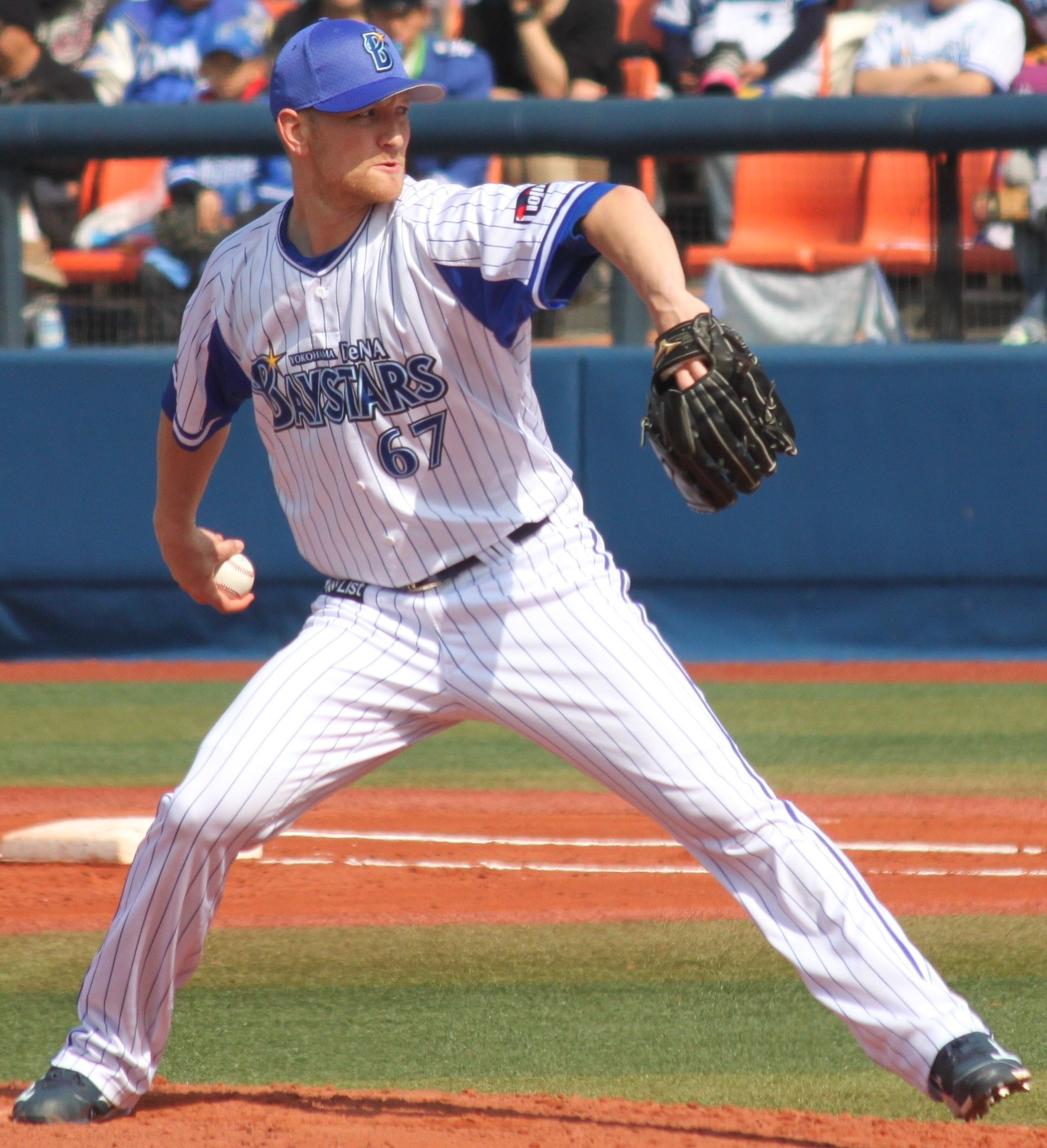
- Petrick pitching the Yokohama DeNA BayStars, in 2016
- Pitcher
- Born: July 29, 1989 (age 36); Morris, Illinois, U.S.
- Batted: Right Threw: Right

Professional debut
- NPB: April 7, 2016, for the Yokohama Bay Stars
- KBO: March 31, 2017, for the Samsung Lions

Last appearance
- NPB: 2016, for the Yokohama DeNA BayStars
- KBO: October 3, 2017, for the Samsung Lions

NPB statistics
- Win–loss record: 3–2
- Earned run average: 5.51
- Strikeouts: 22

KBO statistics
- Win–loss record: 3–10
- Earned run average: 6.18
- Strikeouts: 87
- Stats at Baseball Reference

Teams
- Yokohama DeNA BayStars (2016); Samsung Lions (2017)

Zachary Bernard Petrick (born July 29, 1989) is an American former professional baseball pitcher. He played in Nippon Professional Baseball (NPB) for the Yokohama DeNA BayStars and in the KBO League for the Samsung Lions.

== Career ==
Petrick graduated from Morris Community High School in Morris, Illinois. He then enrolled at Joliet Junior College. He transferred to the University of Northwestern Ohio, and was signed by the St. Louis Cardinals as an undrafted free agent. He played the 2012 season with the Johnson City Cardinals of the Rookie-level Appalachian League.

Petrick began the 2013 season with the Peoria Chiefs of the Class A Midwest League, and received midseason promotions to the Palm Beach Cardinals of the Class A-Advanced Florida State League and Springfield Cardinals of the Class AA Texas League. For the season, he combined a 7–3 record (W–L) with a 1.99 earned run average (ERA) and eight saves covering 34 appearances and 13 starts between Peoria, Palm Beach, and Springfield. Pitching at first in relief, his ERA at Peoria was 0.83 and Palm Beach 0.27. At Springfield, he assumed a starting role. In December, the Cardinals named Petrick their 2013 Minor League Pitcher of the Year. "[At Springfield], after nine starts, he established himself for the season as our Minor League Pitcher of the year for 2013", commented Gary LaRocque, the Cardinals' farm director.

In December 2015, the Cardinals transferred the rights of Petrick to the Yokohama DeNA BayStars of Nippon Professional Baseball.

== Personal ==
His brother, Billy Petrick, played in Major League Baseball for the Chicago Cubs in 2007.
