= 2014 Major League Baseball season =

2014 MLB season
- League: Major League Baseball
- Sport: Baseball
- Duration: March 22 – October 29, 2014
- Games: 162
- Teams: 30
- TV partner(s): Fox/FS1; TBS; ESPN; MLB Network

Draft
- Top draft pick: Brady Aiken
- Picked by: Houston Astros

Regular season
- Season MVP: AL: Mike Trout (LAA); NL: Clayton Kershaw (LAD)

Postseason
- AL champions: Kansas City Royals
- AL runners-up: Baltimore Orioles
- NL champions: San Francisco Giants
- NL runners-up: St. Louis Cardinals

World Series
- Champions: San Francisco Giants
- Runners-up: Kansas City Royals
- World Series MVP: Madison Bumgarner (SF)

MLB seasons
- ← 2013 2015 →

Locations of AL teams for the 2013–2019 MLB seasons
West Central East
Locations of NL teams for the 2013–2016 MLB seasons
West Central East

The 2014 Major League Baseball season began on March 22 at the Sydney Cricket Ground in Sydney, Australia, between the Los Angeles Dodgers and the Arizona Diamondbacks. The North American part of the season started on March 30 and ended on September 28.

The Major League Baseball All-Star Game's 85th edition was held on July 14 at Target Field in Minneapolis, Minnesota, home of the Minnesota Twins. The American League (AL) beat the National League (NL) 5–3. With the win, the AL champion earned home-field advantage during the World Series.

This year the Houston Astros hosted the Civil Rights Game on May 30 at Minute Maid Park. They played host to the Baltimore Orioles.

This was also the final season of Bud Selig as the Commissioner of Baseball. Selig served as the Executive Council Chairman from 1992 to 1998, acting as the commissioner, and then was appointed as the official commissioner in 1998. On August 14, 2014, the franchise owners selected Rob Manfred to become the new Commissioner, starting in 2015.

== Standings ==
=== American League ===
AL East
Team	W	L	Pct.	GB	Home	Road
^{(2)} Baltimore Orioles	96	66	.593	—	50‍–‍31	46‍–‍35
New York Yankees	84	78	.519	12	43‍–‍38	41‍–‍40
Toronto Blue Jays	83	79	.512	13	46‍–‍35	37‍–‍44
Tampa Bay Rays	77	85	.475	19	36‍–‍45	41‍–‍40
Boston Red Sox	71	91	.438	25	34‍–‍47	37‍–‍44

AL Central
Team	W	L	Pct.	GB	Home	Road
^{(3)} Detroit Tigers	90	72	.556	—	45‍–‍36	45‍–‍36
^{(4)} Kansas City Royals	89	73	.549	1	42‍–‍39	47‍–‍34
Cleveland Indians	85	77	.525	5	48‍–‍33	37‍–‍44
Chicago White Sox	73	89	.451	17	40‍–‍41	33‍–‍48
Minnesota Twins	70	92	.432	20	35‍–‍46	35‍–‍46

AL West
Team	W	L	Pct.	GB	Home	Road
^{(1)} Los Angeles Angels	98	64	.605	—	52‍–‍29	46‍–‍35
^{(5)} Oakland Athletics	88	74	.543	10	48‍–‍33	40‍–‍41
Seattle Mariners	87	75	.537	11	41‍–‍40	46‍–‍35
Houston Astros	70	92	.432	28	38‍–‍43	32‍–‍49
Texas Rangers	67	95	.414	31	33‍–‍48	34‍–‍47

=== National League ===
NL East
Team	W	L	Pct.	GB	Home	Road
^{(1)} Washington Nationals	96	66	.593	—	51‍–‍30	45‍–‍36
Atlanta Braves	79	83	.488	17	42‍–‍39	37‍–‍44
New York Mets	79	83	.488	17	40‍–‍41	39‍–‍42
Miami Marlins	77	85	.475	19	42‍–‍39	35‍–‍46
Philadelphia Phillies	73	89	.451	23	37‍–‍44	36‍–‍45

NL Central
Team	W	L	Pct.	GB	Home	Road
^{(3)} St. Louis Cardinals	90	72	.556	—	51‍–‍30	39‍–‍42
^{(4)} Pittsburgh Pirates	88	74	.543	2	51‍–‍30	37‍–‍44
Milwaukee Brewers	82	80	.506	8	42‍–‍39	40‍–‍41
Cincinnati Reds	76	86	.469	14	44‍–‍37	32‍–‍49
Chicago Cubs	73	89	.451	17	41‍–‍40	32‍–‍49

NL West
Team	W	L	Pct.	GB	Home	Road
^{(2)} Los Angeles Dodgers	94	68	.580	—	45‍–‍36	49‍–‍32
^{(5)} San Francisco Giants	88	74	.543	6	45‍–‍36	43‍–‍38
San Diego Padres	77	85	.475	17	48‍–‍33	29‍–‍52
Colorado Rockies	66	96	.407	28	45‍–‍36	21‍–‍60
Arizona Diamondbacks	64	98	.395	30	33‍–‍48	31‍–‍50

== Postseason ==
=== Bracket ===
Wild Card Game (ALWC, NLWC)
4	Kansas City	1
5	Oakland	0
4	Pittsburgh	0
5	San Francisco	1

Division Series (ALDS, NLDS)
1	LA Angels	0
4	Kansas City	3
American League
2	Baltimore	3
3	Detroit	0
1	Washington	1
5	San Francisco	3
National League
2	LA Dodgers	1
3	St. Louis	3

League Championship Series (ALCS, NLCS)
4	Kansas City	4
2	Baltimore	0
5	San Francisco	4
3	St. Louis	1

World Series
AL4	Kansas City	3
NL5	San Francisco	4

== Schedule ==
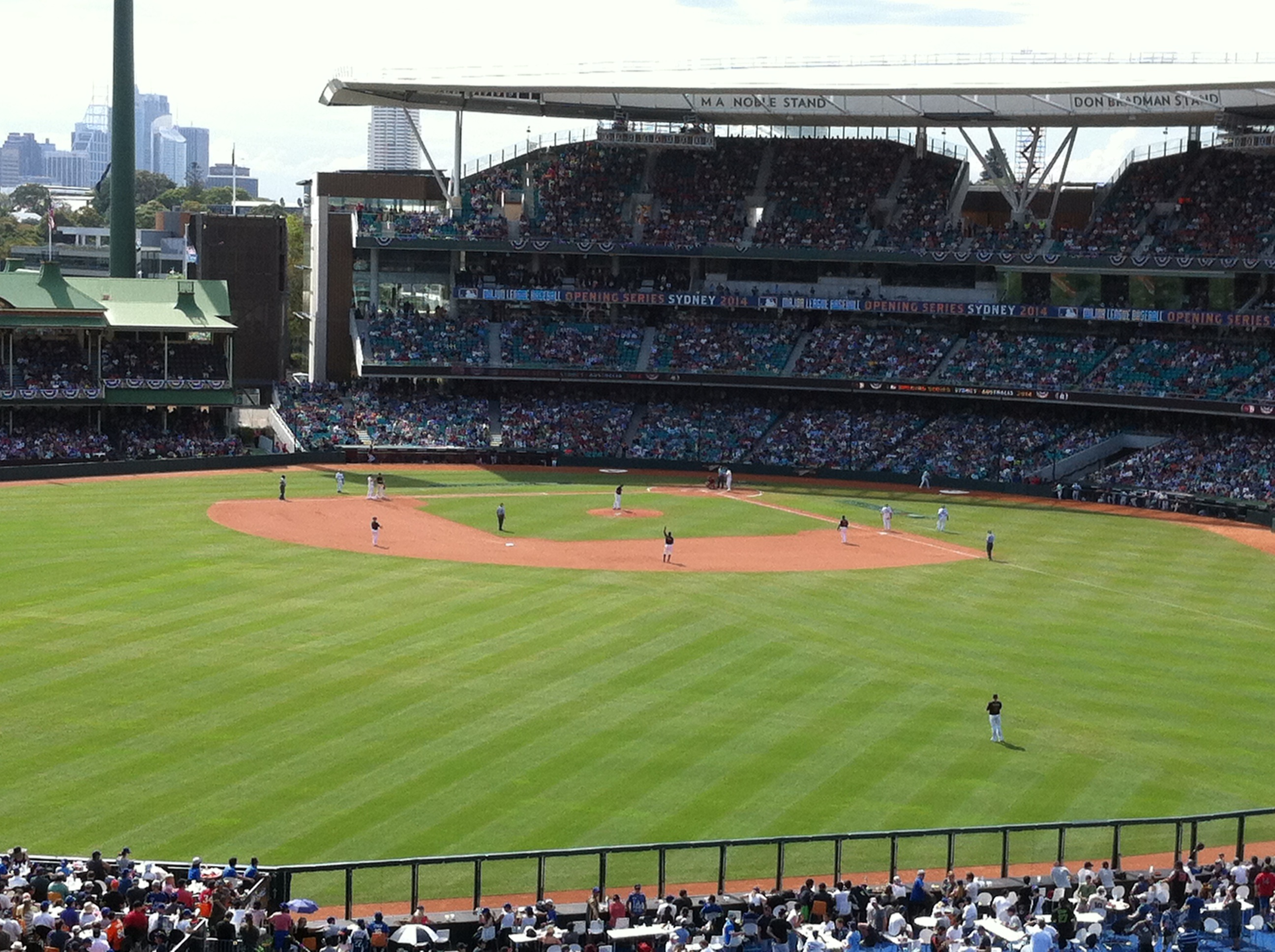
The Diamondbacks and Dodgers play in Sydney, March 23

No significant changes were made to the 2014 schedule. As was the case in 2013, each team played 19 games against each division opponent for a total of 76 games, and six or seven games against each team from the other two divisions in its league for a total of 66 games. All teams played 20 interleague games, with the majority of match-ups following the divisional rotation in place since 2004. For 2014, the matchups were AL East vs. NL Central, AL Central vs. NL West, and AL West vs. NL East. Teams played four games against a designated "rival" in two back-to-back two-game series, one home and one away. Unlike in 2013, when all of these series were played during the same week, these rivalry series were spread from early May through mid-August. The table below shows the interleague rivals for the 2014 season.

AL East	NL East	AL Central	NL Central	AL West	NL West
Red Sox	Braves	White Sox	Cubs	Mariners	Padres
Yankees	Mets	Indians	Reds	Angels	Dodgers
Blue Jays	Phillies	Tigers	Pirates	Athletics	Giants
Rays	Marlins	Twins	Brewers	Rangers	Rockies
Orioles	Nationals	Royals	Cardinals	Astros	Diamondbacks

== Rule changes ==
On August 15, 2013, Major League Baseball announced that it would expand its video review process for the 2014 season, and MLB clubs unanimously approved the new rules on January 16, 2014. Managers were now able to challenge certain plays no more than twice per game, including force plays, fair or foul balls, and batters hit by a pitch, among others. If a manager exhausted his ability to challenge plays during the game and after the beginning of the seventh inning, the umpire crew chief could choose to invoke instant replay on any reviewable call. Calls that were challenged were reviewed by an umpiring crew at MLB headquarters in New York City, which made the final ruling.

On December 11, 2013, the Playing Rules Committee voted overwhelmingly to outlaw home-plate collisions between runners and catchers. On February 24, 2014, the new rule was put into effect as Rule 7.13 was released.

== Managerial changes ==
=== General managers ===
==== In-season ====
Team	Former GM	New GM	Reason for leaving	Former job
Atlanta Braves	Frank Wren	John Hart (interim)	Fired	Hart was a former Indians and Rangers general manager and was the current Braves senior advisor.

=== Field managers ===
==== In-season ====
Team	Former manager	Interim manager	Reason for leaving	Story/Accomplishments
Houston Astros	Bo Porter	Tom Lawless	Fired	Porter was fired on September 1 along with bench coach Dave Trembley. Lawless was named the interim manager. Porter finished with a 110–190 in under two seasons.
Texas Rangers	Ron Washington	Tim Bogar	Resigned	Washington resigned on September 5 for personal reasons after eight seasons with the Rangers. He finished with a 664–611 record and is the franchise's all-time leader in regular season wins and games managed. Washington led the Rangers to four straight 90-win seasons, three playoff appearances, and back-to-back American League championships in 2010 and 2011. Bogar, who is the current bench coach, was named the interim manager for the rest of the 2014 season.
Arizona Diamondbacks	Kirk Gibson	Alan Trammell	Fired	Gibson was fired on September 26 after four years as manager of the Diamondbacks. He finished with a 353–375 record and led the Diamondbacks to the division title during the 2011 season while capturing the National League Manager of the Year award. Trammell, who previously was the bench coach, will take over as manager for the final three games of the season.

==== Off-season ====
At the end of the 2013 season, the following teams made replacements to their managers.

Team	Former manager	New manager	Reason for leaving	Story/Accomplishments
Seattle Mariners	Eric Wedge	Lloyd McClendon	Resigned	Wedge declined to return on September 27, 2013, as he missed part of the season with a partial stroke. He finished with a 213–273 record in three seasons. McClendon was announced as the new manager on November 5, 2013. McClendon previously managed the Pittsburgh Pirates from 2001 to 2005 and compiled a 336–446 record.
Chicago Cubs	Dale Sveum	Rick Renteria	Fired	Sveum was fired by the Cubs after two seasons and a record of 127–197. Rentería was named manager on November 7, 2013, after being the bench coach for the San Diego Padres the last two seasons.
Washington Nationals	Davey Johnson	Matt Williams	Retired	Johnson announced on November 12, 2012, that the 2013 season would be his last. He finished with a record of 224–183 in his three seasons. Matt Williams was announced on October 31, 2013, as the new manager.
Cincinnati Reds	Dusty Baker	Bryan Price	Fired	Baker was fired by the Reds after six seasons and a record of 509–463. Price served as the Reds pitching coach for four seasons.
Detroit Tigers	Jim Leyland	Brad Ausmus	Resigned and Retired	Leyland resigned on October 21, 2013, and then retired the next day with a record of 700–597 (.540) with three division titles (2011–13), one AL wild card (2006) and two AL pennants (2006 and 2012). Ausmus was announced as the next manager on November 3, 2013.

== League leaders ==
=== American League ===
Hitting leaders
Stat	Player	Total
AVG	Jose Altuve (HOU)	.341
OPS	Víctor Martínez (DET)	.974
HR	Nelson Cruz (BAL)	40
RBI	Mike Trout (LAA)	111
R	Mike Trout (LAA)	115
H	Jose Altuve (HOU)	225
SB	Jose Altuve (HOU)	56

Pitching leaders
Stat	Player	Total
W	Corey Kluber (CLE); Max Scherzer (DET); Jered Weaver (LAA)	18
L	Colby Lewis (TEX)	14
ERA	Félix Hernández (SEA)	2.14
K	David Price (DET/TB)	271
IP	David Price (DET/TB)	248.1
SV	Fernando Rodney (SEA)	48
WHIP	Félix Hernández (SEA)	0.915

=== National League ===
Hitting leaders
Stat	Player	Total
AVG	Justin Morneau (COL)	.319
OPS	Andrew McCutchen (PIT)	.952
HR	Giancarlo Stanton (MIA)	37
RBI	Adrián González (LAD)	119
R	Anthony Rendon (WSH)	111
H	Ben Revere (PHI); Denard Span (WSH)	184
SB	Dee Gordon (LAD)	64

Pitching leaders
Stat	Player	Total
W	Clayton Kershaw (LAD)	21
L	A. J. Burnett (PHI)	18
ERA	Clayton Kershaw (LAD)	1.77
K	Johnny Cueto (CIN); Stephen Strasburg (WSH)	242
IP	Johnny Cueto (CIN)	243.2
SV	Craig Kimbrel (ATL)	47
WHIP	Clayton Kershaw (LAD)	0.857

== Milestones ==
=== Batters ===
- Evan Longoria (TAM):
  - His home run in the seventh inning against the Toronto Blue Jays on April 3 gives him 163 for his Rays' career. This ties the team record held by Carlos Peña. Longoria set the franchise record with his 164th home run on April 19 against the New York Yankees.
- Miguel Cabrera (DET):
  - Recorded his 2,000th career hit with a home run in the eighth inning against the Baltimore Orioles on April 4. He became the 277th player to reach this mark.
- Albert Pujols (LAA):
  - Recorded his 1,500th career RBI with a home run in the first inning against the Chicago White Sox on April 8. He became the 52nd player to reach this mark.
  - Recorded his 500th career home run in the fifth inning against the Washington Nationals on April 22. He became the 26th player to reach this mark.
  - Recorded his 550th career double in the first inning against the Los Angeles Dodgers on August 4. He became the 26th player to reach this mark.
  - Recorded his 1,500th career run scored with a home run in the third inning on September 6 against the Minnesota Twins. He became the 71st player to reach this mark.
  - Recorded his 2,500th career hit with a double in the ninth inning on September 6 against the Minnesota Twins. He became the 98th player to reach this mark.
- Raúl Ibañez (KC)/(LAA):
  - Recorded his 2,000th career hit with a home run in the ninth inning against the New York Mets on April 12. He became the 278th player to reach this mark.
- Elvis Andrus (TEX):
  - Set team record for stolen bases in career on April 18. Setting the record with his 173 stolen base, breaking the record which was set by Ian Kinsler.
- José Abreu (CWS):
  - Set the rookie record for home runs in April by hitting his ninth on April 25 against the Tampa Bay Rays. He broke the record of eight set by Albert Pujols, Carlos Delgado and Kent Hrbek. Abreu finished April with ten home runs.
  - Set the rookie record for RBI in April by raising his total to 31 on April 27 against the Tampa Bay Rays. He broke the record of 27 set by Albert Pujols. Abreu finished April with 32 runs batted in.
  - Tied the franchise rookie record for home runs with his 35th homer in the ninth inning on September 14 against the Minnesota Twins. He tied the record that was set in 1983 by Ron Kittle. He set a new record with his 36th home run on September 27 against the Kansas City Royals.
- Adrián Beltré (TEX):
  - Recorded his 500th career double in the second inning against the Seattle Mariners on April 27. He became the 59th player to reach this mark.
  - Recorded his 2,500th career hit with a single in the second inning on June 24 against the Detroit Tigers. He became the 97th player to reach this mark.
- Nolan Arenado (COL):
  - With a double in the first inning on May 7 against the Texas Rangers, Arenado extended his hit streak to 27 games which tied the team record set by Michael Cuddyer in 2013. Arenado set the team record with a single in the third inning the next night against the Rangers. Arenado's streak came to an end the very next night as the Cincinnati Reds held him hitless.
- Alfonso Soriano (NYY):
  - With his single in the second inning on May 12 against the New York Mets, Soriano became the seventh player in Major League history to amass 1,000 hits in both the American and National Leagues. He joins Dave Winfield, Frank Robinson, Vladimir Guerrero, Fred McGriff, Carlos Lee, and Orlando Cabrera.
- Edwin Encarnación (TOR):
  - With his multi-homer game on May 29 against the Kansas City Royals, Encarnacion tied a Major League record with his fifth multi-homer game this month. That ties the record that was set by Harmon Killebrew in May 1959 and Albert Belle in September 1995.
  - He hit 16 home runs in May, tying the American League record for home runs in May set by Mickey Mantle in May 1956.
- George Springer (HOU):
  - With his home run on May 29 against the Baltimore Orioles, Springer has hit seven home runs in his last seven games. He became the second rookie in Major League history to hit seven home runs over a seven-game span in one season. Rudy York accomplished this in August 1937.
- Ryan Howard (PHI):
  - Recorded his 1,000th career RBI with a home run in the seventh inning on May 31 against the New York Mets. He became the 276th player to reach this mark.
  - On May 29 in a game against the New York Mets, Howard earned his 24th career Golden Sombrero, surpassing Reggie Jackson to take the all-time MLB lead.
- Adam Dunn (OAK)/(CWS):
  - Recorded his 450th career home run with his homer in the ninth inning on June 6 against the Los Angeles Angels of Anaheim. He became the 36th player to reach this mark.
- Jimmy Rollins (PHI):
  - With his single in the fifth inning on June 14 against the Chicago Cubs, Rollins became the all-time franchise leader in hits with 2,235. He broke the record that was held by Mike Schmidt.
- Matt Holliday (STL):
  - Recorded his 1,000th career RBI with a single in the fifth inning on June 16 against the New York Mets. He became the 277th player to reach this mark.
- David Ortiz (BOS):
  - Recorded his 450th career home run in the third inning against the New York Yankees on June 29. He became the 37th player to reach this mark.
  - Recorded his 1,500th career RBI with a home run in the first inning on July 23 against the Toronto Blue Jays. He became the 53rd player to reach this mark.
  - By driving in his 100th run of the season on September 19 against the Baltimore Orioles, Ortiz recorded his eighth 30/100 season as a member of the Red Sox and set a franchise record passing Ted Williams.
- Derek Jeter (NYY):
  - Tied Lou Gehrig for most doubles in franchise history with his 534th career double in the fourth inning on July 1 against the Tampa Bay Rays. Jeter set the team record on July 22 against the Texas Rangers with a double in the ninth inning.
  - Set a Major League record for most starts at shortstop when he started at short against the Cincinnati Reds on July 18. This was Jeter's 2,610th career start which broke the record that was held by Omar Vizquel.
- Madison Bumgarner/Buster Posey (SF):
  - Became the first batterymates to hit a grand slam in the same game in Major League history on July 13 against the Arizona Diamondbacks.
- Adrián González (LAD):
  - Recorded his 250th career home run in the seventh inning against the Pittsburgh Pirates on July 22. He became the 209th player to reach this mark.
- B.J. Upton/Justin Upton (ATL):
  - With their home runs on August 8 against the Washington Nationals, it marked the fifth time that they had homered as teammates in the same game, establishing a new Major League record. They broke the record that they shared with Jason and Jeremy Giambi and Vladimir and Wilton Guerrero.
- Michael Cuddyer (COL):
  - Became the third player in Major League history (joining John Olerud and Bob Watson) to hit for a cycle in both leagues by hitting for the cycle on August 17 against the Cincinnati Reds. He hit for the cycle with the Minnesota Twins in 2009.
- Jorge Soler (CHC):
  - With his double in the second inning on September 1 against the Milwaukee Brewers, Soler became the third player in the last one hundred years to record at least one extra-base hit in each of his first five games in the majors. Soler joins Enos Slaughter (1938) and Will Middlebrooks (2012).
- Billy Hamilton (CIN):
  - Set the franchise rookie record by recording his 55th steal in the first inning against the Baltimore Orioles on September 2. He broke the record that was set by Bob Bescher in 1909. Hamilton finished the season with 56 stolen bases.
- Jose Altuve (HOU):
  - Set the Astros franchise record with most hits in a season by collecting his 211th hit in seventh inning against the Cleveland Indians on September 16. He broke the record that was set in 1998 by Craig Biggio. Altuve finished the season with 225 hits.
- Jonathan Lucroy (MIL):
  - Tied the Major League record for most doubles in one season as a catcher when he hit his 45th double on September 18 against the St. Louis Cardinals in the fourth inning. He tied the record set by Iván Rodríguez in 1996. Lucroy hit his 46th double as a catcher on September 27 against the Chicago Cubs establishing a new Major League record.
- Denard Span (WSH):
  - Set the Nationals franchise record for hits in a season with his 184th hit on September 27 against the Miami Marlins. Span, who broke Cristian Guzmán's team record, broke the record with a double in the third inning.

=== Pitchers ===
==== No-hitters ====
- Josh Beckett (LAD):
  - Pitched the first no-hitter of his career on May 25 against the Philadelphia Phillies. In 128 pitches, he struck out six batters, and walked three. It was the 24th in Dodgers' team history and the 11th since moving to Los Angeles.
- Clayton Kershaw (LAD):
  - Pitched the first no-hitter of his career on June 18 against the Colorado Rockies. In 107 pitches, he struck out 15 batters, and walked none. He lost his perfect game when Hanley Ramírez committed a throwing error in the seventh inning. It was the 25th in Dodgers' team history and the 12th since moving to Los Angeles.
- Tim Lincecum (SF):
  - Pitched his second no-hitter of his career on June 25 against the San Diego Padres. In 113 pitches, he struck out six batters, and walked one. It was the 16th in Giants' team history and the 8th since moving to San Francisco. Lincecum joins Christy Mathewson as only the second Giant pitcher to throw two no-hitters in his career. He also becomes the fourth pitcher in Major League history to pitch multiple no-hitters and win multiple Cy Young Awards joining Sandy Koufax, Randy Johnson and Roy Halladay.
- Cole Hamels/Jacob Diekman/Ken Giles/Jonathan Papelbon (PHI):
  - Hamels went six innings on September 1 against the Atlanta Braves throwing 108 pitches. Diekman threw 15 pitches in the seventh and Giles also threw 15 in the eighth. Papelbon came on in the ninth and retired the side on nine pitches. This no-hitter was the 12th in team history and the first since Roy Halladay's no-hitter in the 2010 playoffs. The pitchers combined to strikeout 12 batters and Hamels walked five batters. This was also the 11th combined no-hitter in Major League history.
- Jordan Zimmermann (WSH):
  - Zimmermann threw his first career no-hitter, and the first since the Nationals return to Washington, D.C., on September 28 against the Miami Marlins. Zimmermann threw 104 pitches and struck out ten batters while walking one. This is the fifth no-hitter in the Expos/Nationals franchise history and the first since Dennis Martínez's perfect game in 1991 when the team was in Montreal.

==== Other Accomplishments ====
- Yu Darvish (TEX):
  - Became the fastest pitcher to reach 500 strikeouts in his career as he reached it in 401 2/3 innings on April 6. He broke Kerry Wood's record of 404 2/3 innings.
- Masahiro Tanaka (NYY):
  - Set the franchise record for most strikeouts for any pitcher in their first two starts as a Yankee. Tanaka 18 strikeouts broke the record of 17 that was held by Charles Hudson (April 1987), Dennis Rasmussen (May 1984) and Bob Turley (April 1955).
  - Became the first pitcher in the modern era (since 1900) to record at least eight wins and 80 strikeouts (has 88) in his first 11 career starts in the majors. He reached this milestone on May 31 against the Minnesota Twins.
- Zack Greinke (LAD):
  - Has not allowed more than two runs in any of his last 20 starts, the longest streak in Major League history (since 1876). The previous record holder belonged to Ferdie Schupp, who allowed fewer than three runs in 16 consecutive games started for the Giants in 1916 and 1917. His streak ended after 21 starts when the New York Mets scored three runs on May 22.
- Jeff Samardzija (OAK)/(CHC):
  - Became the first pitcher in Major League history (since 1876) to go winless in his first eight starts of a season despite not allowing more than three runs in any outing. That ended on his ninth start when he allowed four runs to the Milwaukee Brewers on May 16 in the first two innings.
- Joe Nathan (DET):
  - Recorded his 350th career save by closing out a 4–1 victory against the Baltimore Orioles on May 13. He became the ninth player to reach this mark.
- Craig Kimbrel (ATL):
  - By closing out the game against the St. Louis Cardinals on May 18, Kimbrel recorded his 150th career save in his 248th career appearance. This is the fewest appearances needed to reach this milestone.
- A. J. Burnett (PHI):
  - Recorded his 150th career win with a victory against the Miami Marlins on May 20. He became the 249th player to reach this mark.
- Bartolo Colón (NYM):
  - Recorded his 2,000th career strikeout by striking out Ike Davis of the Pittsburgh Pirates in the sixth inning on May 28. He became the 70th player to reach this mark.
  - Recorded his 200th career win with a victory against the Philadelphia Phillies on August 8. He became the 115th player to reach this mark.
- Huston Street (LAA)/(SD):
  - Recorded his 250th career save by closing out a 4–1 victory against the Chicago White Sox on May 30. He became the 33rd player to reach this mark.
- Jonathan Papelbon (PHI):
  - Recorded his 300th career save by closing out a 5–2 victory against the San Diego Padres on June 10. He became the 26th player to reach this mark.
- Tampa Bay Rays:
  - With Brad Boxberger striking out Yankees' Ichiro Suzuki in the 12th inning on June 30, the Rays set the Major League record for most strikeouts by a pitching staff in any month. The Rays' pitching staff struck out 287 batters in June, breaking the record set by the Chicago Cubs in August 2002.
- Aroldis Chapman (CIN):
  - With his strikeout of Jordy Mercer of the Pittsburgh Pirates in the ninth inning on July 11, Chapman set the Major League record with at least one strikeout in 40 consecutive relief appearances. The streak dates back to last season. The previous record was held by Bruce Sutter who set the record in 1977. His streak came to an end at 49 games on August 15 against the Colorado Rockies as he failed to record a strikeout.
- Fernando Rodney (SEA):
  - Recorded his 200th career save by closing out a 4–3 victory against the Baltimore Orioles on July 26. He became the 45th player to reach this mark.
- Rafael Soriano (WSH):
  - Recorded his 200th career save by closing out a 4–2 victory against the Cincinnati Reds on July 27. He became the 46th player to reach this mark.
- Corey Kluber (CLE):
  - Became the first pitcher in Major League history to face 28 or fewer batters in back-to-back starts of at least nine innings with his complete game against the Seattle Mariners on July 30. He also faced one batter over the minimum on July 24 against the Kansas City Royals.
- John Lackey (STL)/(BOS):
  - Recorded his 150th career win with a victory against the Milwaukee Brewers on August 3. He became the 250th player to reach this mark.
- Tim Hudson (SF):
  - Recorded his 2,000th career strikeout by striking out Franklin Morales of the Colorado Rockies in the sixth inning on August 27. He became the 71st player to reach this mark.
- Yusmeiro Petit (SF):
  - Set the Major League record for most consecutive batters retired by striking out Charlie Culberson of the Colorado Rockies on August 28. Petit retired 46 batters in a row breaking the record held by Mark Buehrle (45 consecutive) set in 2009. Petit set this record over seven appearances.
- Jake Peavy (SF)/(BOS):
  - Recorded his 2,000th career strikeout by striking out Aramis Ramírez of the Milwaukee Brewers in the second inning on August 30. He became the 72nd player to reach this mark.
- Justin Verlander (DET):
  - Recorded his 150th career win with a victory against the Kansas City Royals on September 8. He became the 251st player to reach this mark.
- Madison Bumgarner (SF):
  - Set the franchise record for most strikeouts in a season by a left-hander by striking out his 207th batter of the season, Juan Uribe, on September 12 against the Los Angeles Dodgers. Bumgarner finished the season with 219 strikeouts.
- Jacob deGrom (NYM):
  - Tied the Major League record for most consecutive strikeouts to begin the game by striking out eight Miami Marlins on September 15. He tied the record that was set by Jim Deshaies on September 23, 1986.
- Dellin Betances (NYY):
  - With two strikeouts on September 17 against the Tampa Bay Rays in a scoreless eighth inning, Betances set the single-season franchise record of 132 strikeouts by a reliever breaking the record of 130 set by Mariano Rivera in 1996. Betances finished the season with 135 strikeouts.
- Phil Hughes (MIN):
  - Set the Major League single-season strikeout-to-walk ratio record of 11.63 (186 strikeouts and 16 walks) breaking the record of 11.0 set in 1994 by Bret Saberhagen.
- Cleveland Indians:
  - Set the Major League record for most strikeouts by pitchers in a season when Corey Kluber struck out David DeJesus of the Tampa Bay Rays in the eighth inning on September 26. Kluber's strikeout was the team's 1,429th strikeout of the season breaking the record set by Detroit Tigers set in 2013. The Indians finished the season with 1,450 strikeouts.
- Brandon Finnegan (KC):
  - Became the first player to play in both the College World Series and the MLB World Series when he pitched in Game 3 of the 2014 World Series.

=== Miscellaneous ===
- The Kansas City Royals ended a 29-year drought of no playoff appearances
- The Oakland Athletics set a Major League record by losing their tenth straight opener with their loss to the Cleveland Indians.
- Ron Gardenhire (MIN):
  - Recorded his 1,000th career managerial victory with his win on April 5 against the Cleveland Indians. He became the 60th manager to reach this mark.
- The Chicago Cubs became the third Major League team to amass 10,000 losses with their loss to the Atlanta Braves on May 11. The Cubs join the Philadelphia Phillies and Atlanta Braves as the only teams to reach that mark.
- The Atlanta Braves, with their win against the Philadelphia Phillies on July 18, have won their first game after the All-Star break in nine consecutive seasons (since 2006), which tied a Major League record. They tied the record that is held by the Montreal Expos (1984–1992) and New York Yankees (1940–1949, 2002–2010).
- Major League Baseball recorded its 2,000,000th strikeout on July 27 when the Indians' Danny Salazar struck out the Royals' Norichika Aoki in the seventh inning.
- The Cleveland Indians recorded their 9,000th franchise victory with a win against the Kansas City Royals on August 30. They become the 11th franchise to amass this many victories.
- The Detroit Tigers recorded their 9,000th franchise victory with a win against the Kansas City Royals on September 8. They become the 12th franchise to amass this many victories.
- The New York Yankees recorded their 15,000th franchise home run against the Toronto Blue Jays on September 21. Brett Gardner hit the home run in the fifth inning. The Yankees are the first franchise to reach this plateau.
- This marks the first time since the 1993 postseason where neither the New York Yankees nor the Boston Red Sox qualified.

== Awards and honors ==
=== Regular season ===
Baseball Writers' Association of America Awards
BBWAA Award	National League	American League
Rookie of the Year	Jacob DeGrom (NYM)	José Abreu (CWS)
Cy Young Award	Clayton Kershaw (LAD)	Corey Kluber (CLE)
Manager of the Year	Matt Williams (WSH)	Buck Showalter (BAL)
Most Valuable Player	Clayton Kershaw (LAD)	Mike Trout (LAA)
Gold Glove Awards
Position	National League	American League
Pitcher	Zack Greinke (LAD)	Dallas Keuchel (HOU)
Catcher	Yadier Molina (STL)	Salvador Pérez (KC)
1st Base	Adrián González (LAD)	Eric Hosmer (KC)
2nd Base	DJ LeMahieu (COL)	Dustin Pedroia (BOS)
3rd Base	Nolan Arenado (COL)	Kyle Seager (SEA)
Shortstop	Andrelton Simmons (ATL)	J. J. Hardy (BAL)
Left field	Christian Yelich (MIA)	Alex Gordon (KC)
Center field	Juan Lagares (NYM)	Adam Jones (BAL)
Right field	Jason Heyward (ATL)	Nick Markakis (BAL)
Silver Slugger Awards
Pitcher/Designated Hitter	Madison Bumgarner (SF)	Víctor Martínez (DET)
Catcher	Buster Posey (SF)	Yan Gomes (CLE)
1st Base	Adrián González (LAD)	José Abreu (CWS)
2nd Base	Neil Walker (PIT)	Jose Altuve (HOU)
3rd Base	Anthony Rendon (WSH)	Adrián Beltré (TEX)
Shortstop	Ian Desmond (WSH)	Alexei Ramírez (CWS)
Outfield	Giancarlo Stanton (MIA)	José Bautista (TOR)
Outfield	Justin Upton (ATL)	Michael Brantley (CLE)
Outfield	Andrew McCutchen (PIT)	Mike Trout (LAA)

=== Other awards ===
- The Sporting News Player of the Year Award: Clayton Kershaw (LAD)
- Comeback Players of the Year: Chris Young (SEA, American); Casey McGehee (MIA, National)
- Hank Aaron Award: Mike Trout (LAA, American); Giancarlo Stanton (MIA, National)
- Edgar Martínez Award (Best designated hitter): Víctor Martínez (DET)
- Roberto Clemente Award (Humanitarian): Paul Konerko (CWS); Jimmy Rollins (PHI)
- Mariano Rivera AL Reliever of the Year Award (Best AL reliever): Greg Holland (KC)
- Trevor Hoffman NL Reliever of the Year Award (Best NL reliever): Craig Kimbrel (ATL)
- Warren Spahn Award (Best left-handed pitcher): Clayton Kershaw (LAD)

Fielding Bible Awards
Position	Player
Pitcher	Dallas Keuchel (HOU)
Catcher	Jonathan Lucroy (MIL)
1st Base	Adrián González (LAD)
2nd Base	Dustin Pedroia (BOS)
3rd Base	Josh Donaldson (OAK)
Shortstop	Andrelton Simmons (ATL)
Left Field	Alex Gordon (KC)
Center Field	Juan Lagares (NYM)
Right Field	Jason Heyward (ATL)
Multi-position	Lorenzo Cain (KC)

=== Monthly awards ===
==== Player of the Month ====
Month	American League	National League
April	José Abreu	Troy Tulowitzki
May	Edwin Encarnación	Yasiel Puig
June	Mike Trout	Andrew McCutchen
July	José Abreu	Jayson Werth
August	Víctor Martínez	Josh Harrison
September	Miguel Cabrera	Matt Kemp

==== Pitcher of the Month ====
Month	American League	National League
April	Sonny Gray	Jose Fernandez
May	Masahiro Tanaka	Madison Bumgarner
June	Félix Hernández	Clayton Kershaw
July	Sonny Gray	Clayton Kershaw
August	Matt Shoemaker	Madison Bumgarner
September	Corey Kluber	Adam Wainwright

==== Rookie of the Month ====
Month	American League	National League
April	José Abreu	Chris Owings
May	George Springer	Kolten Wong
June	José Abreu	Billy Hamilton
July	José Abreu	Jacob deGrom
August	Matt Shoemaker	Kyle Hendricks
September	Collin McHugh	Jacob deGrom

== Home field attendance and payroll ==
Team name	Wins	%±	Home attendance	%±	Per game	Est. payroll	%±
Los Angeles Dodgers	94	2.2%	3,782,337	1.0%	46,696	$233,386,026	−8.2%
St. Louis Cardinals	90	−7.2%	3,540,649	5.1%	43,712	$129,932,500	15.4%
New York Yankees	84	−1.2%	3,401,624	3.7%	41,995	$258,118,959	4.7%
San Francisco Giants	88	15.8%	3,368,697	0.0%	41,589	$163,510,167	16.9%
Los Angeles Angels of Anaheim	98	25.6%	3,095,935	2.5%	38,221	$128,667,000	10.4%
Boston Red Sox	71	−26.8%	2,956,089	4.3%	36,495	$134,628,929	−23.2%
Detroit Tigers	90	−3.2%	2,917,209	−5.4%	36,015	$169,135,500	9.5%
Milwaukee Brewers	82	10.8%	2,797,384	10.5%	34,536	$109,567,000	26.0%
Texas Rangers	67	−26.4%	2,718,733	−14.5%	33,565	$129,801,239	−6.8%
Colorado Rockies	66	−10.8%	2,680,329	−4.1%	33,090	$95,403,500	29.3%
Chicago Cubs	73	10.6%	2,652,113	0.4%	32,742	$59,800,500	−11.9%
Washington Nationals	96	11.6%	2,579,389	−2.8%	31,844	$137,235,080	22.0%
Cincinnati Reds	76	−15.6%	2,476,664	−0.6%	30,576	$102,230,000	−3.8%
Baltimore Orioles	96	12.9%	2,464,473	4.5%	30,426	$109,097,500	8.2%
Pittsburgh Pirates	88	−6.4%	2,442,564	8.2%	30,155	$80,729,000	−18.6%
Philadelphia Phillies	73	0.0%	2,423,852	−19.5%	29,924	$176,444,967	17.0%
Toronto Blue Jays	83	12.2%	2,375,525	−6.3%	29,327	$136,466,200	9.6%
Atlanta Braves	79	−17.7%	2,354,305	−7.6%	29,065	$108,081,500	13.0%
Minnesota Twins	70	6.1%	2,250,606	−9.2%	27,785	$87,044,000	38.1%
San Diego Padres	77	1.3%	2,195,373	1.3%	27,103	$76,662,100	16.2%
New York Mets	79	6.8%	2,148,808	0.6%	26,528	$82,663,615	19.1%
Arizona Diamondbacks	64	−21.0%	2,073,730	−2.9%	25,602	$89,926,500	12.3%
Seattle Mariners	87	22.5%	2,064,334	17.2%	25,486	$95,471,000	21.0%
Oakland Athletics	88	−8.3%	2,003,628	10.7%	24,736	$89,160,900	28.4%
Kansas City Royals	89	3.5%	1,956,482	11.8%	24,154	$89,804,075	2.7%
Houston Astros	70	37.3%	1,751,829	6.1%	21,628	$44,736,800	204.9%
Miami Marlins	77	24.2%	1,732,283	9.2%	21,386	$42,365,400	71.1%
Chicago White Sox	73	15.9%	1,650,821	−6.6%	20,381	$87,475,500	7.5%
Tampa Bay Rays	77	−16.3%	1,446,464	−4.2%	17,858	$77,814,300	9.3%
Cleveland Indians	85	−7.6%	1,437,393	−8.6%	17,746	$73,509,399	−15.8%

== Uniforms ==
=== Wholesale changes ===
- The Atlanta Braves introduced a new patriotic/military themed alternate jersey.
- The Boston Red Sox changed their road jersey to have red lettering with blue trim.
- The Chicago Cubs, in addition to the ten throwback jerseys they'll wear throughout the season, added an alternate road jersey.
- The Cleveland Indians announced that they are changing their primary logo from Chief Wahoo to the block "C".
- The Kansas City Royals announced their new road alternate jersey. The classic KC logo returns.
- The Los Angeles Dodgers added an alternate road jersey with "Dodgers" across the chest.
- The New York Mets added a Mr. Met sleeve patch to their blue alternate home and road jerseys.
- The Oakland Athletics will have a new green alternate jersey to start the 2014 season. Gone is the script "Athletics" across the chest, in its place is the white "A's" cap logo on the left side of the chest with gold piping, basically a reverse of the current gold jersey. It was announced last season, and unveiled on February 8, 2014, during the A's FanFest at Oracle Arena.
- The Pittsburgh Pirates announced that they are changing their primary logo from the pirate to the gold "P" that is on their caps.
- The San Francisco Giants gave a sneak peek on Instagram of a new orange alternate jersey featuring the team's old script logo utilized in the 1970s.

=== Patches ===
==== Anniversaries and special events ====
The following teams will wear commemorative patches for special occasions:

Team	Special occasion
Atlanta Braves	To commemorate the 40th anniversary of Hank Aaron's 715th home run Remembrance of the life of longtime announcer Pete Van Wieren
Baltimore Orioles	60th anniversary in Baltimore; Remembrance of the life of former part-owner Tom Clancy
Boston Red Sox	To commemorate their 2013 World Series championship [home opener only]
Chicago Cubs	Wrigley Field's 100th anniversary
Chicago White Sox	Remembrance of the life of David Reinsdorf, son of owner Jerry Reinsdorf
Los Angeles Angels of Anaheim	Remembrance of the life of former shortstop and manager Jim Fregosi (August 12)
Milwaukee Brewers	Remembrance of the life of scouting director Bruce Seid
Minnesota Twins	Host city of the 2014 Major League Baseball All-Star Game
New York Mets	Remembrance of the life of long time broadcaster Ralph Kiner; Remembrance of the life of former general manager Frank Cashen
Oakland Athletics	25th Anniversary World Series champions reunion Remembrance of the life of former pitcher Bob Welch (July 19)
Philadelphia Phillies	Remembrance of the life of part-owner Claire Betz; Remembrance of the life of former manager Jim Fregosi (August 12)
Pittsburgh Pirates	Remembrance of the life of Hall-of-Fame OF Ralph Kiner
San Diego Padres	Remembrance of the life of long time broadcaster Jerry Coleman; Remembrance of the life of Hall-of-Fame OF Tony Gwynn
Tampa Bay Rays	Remembrance of the life of senior adviser Don Zimmer
All 30 teams	May 11, Mother's Day – Breast cancer awareness
All 30 teams	June 15, Father's Day – Prostate cancer awareness
All 30 teams	July 4 – patches with ALS and Lou Gehrig in commemoration of the 75th anniversary of Gehrig's speech
All 30 teams	July 27–75th anniversary of the Baseball Hall of Fame. The Cardinals and Cubs wore the patches July 26.

=== Throwbacks ===
In addition to ten Cubs throwback uniforms to mark the 100th anniversary of Wrigley Field, selected teams wore throwbacks throughout the season:

- The Braves wore 1974 throwbacks on April 8, the 40th anniversary of Hank Aaron's 715th home run.
- The Diamondbacks wore the uniform of the Kansas City Packers of the Federal League against the Cubs on April 23, the 100th anniversary of Wrigley Field. The Diamondbacks' logo was on each player's left sleeve. The Cubs, as one of ten throwbacks they will wear during the season, wore the uniforms of the Chicago Whales.
- The Braves and Giants wore Negro leagues throwbacks on May 3. The Braves wore the uniforms of the Atlanta Black Crackers, while the Giants wore uniforms of the San Francisco Sea Lions.
- The Royals and Orioles wore Negro leagues throwbacks on May 18. The Royals wore uniforms of the Kansas City Monarchs, and the Orioles wore the uniforms of the Baltimore Black Sox.
- The Tigers and Rangers wore Negro leagues throwbacks on May 24. The Tigers wore uniforms of the Detroit Stars, while the Rangers wore the uniforms of the Fort Worth Black Panthers.
- The Padres wore 1984 throwbacks on consecutive days May 23 and 24. They wore their home throwbacks on May 23, and their away uniforms May 24.
- Both the Astros and Orioles wore Negro leagues throwbacks at the Civil Rights Game on May 30. The Astros wore the uniforms of the Houston Eagles, while the Orioles wore a Negro leagues throwback for the second time in 13 days, donning the uniforms of the Baltimore Elite Giants.
- The Mariners and Astros wore 1979 uniforms on May 24.
- The Twins and Brewers wore 1984 uniforms on June 3 and 5 as part of a home-and-home series.
- The Phillies wore 1964 throwbacks on June 13 and 15. The Cubs, their opponents, wore 1964 throwbacks on June 13, but not June 15.
- The Mets and Pirates wore Negro leagues throwbacks on June 28. The Pirates wore the uniforms of the Pittsburgh Crawfords, while the Mets wore the uniforms of the Brooklyn Royal Giants.
- The Orioles wore 1954 uniforms on August 8, to commemorate the 60th anniversary of the team in Baltimore.
- The Braves and Athletics wore 1914 throwbacks on August 16, to commemorate the 100th anniversary of the franchise (then based in Boston)'s World Series title.
- The Angels wore 1970s throwbacks on August 29.

== Other uniforms ==
- On April 15, players, managers and coaches on all teams wore #42 on the 67th anniversary of Jackie Robinson's debut in the majors to commemorate Jackie Robinson Day.
- On April 21 (Patriots' Day), the Boston Red Sox wore home white jerseys with "BOSTON" written on the front on the one year anniversary of the Boston Marathon bombings.
- The New York Mets will wear special camouflage jerseys for five games to honor U.S. military personnel.
- On May 3, the Astros wore Spanish-language Los Astros uniforms.
- All teams wore camouflage caps and jerseys on May 26, Memorial Day in the United States. The Pirates and Cubs wore the uniforms again on June 10. The Rockies wore the uniforms again on July 6, and the Yankees wore them again on July 20.
- The Reds wore all-camouflage caps and jerseys on June 11, June 22 and July 5. The uniforms had the "Reds" script wordmark on them, instead of the player's number and the Reds' logo. The American flag was on the player's left sleeve. The Reds' wishbone C was on the players' right sleeve instead of their mascot, Mr. Redlegs.
- The Blue Jays wore a red uniform on July 1, Canada Day. They wore a red uniform again on August 10.
- The Nationals wore an all-blue uniform on July 4 and September 11. The "W" logo was red, white and blue.
- Twenty-nine teams wore patriotic caps on July 4. AL teams wore red caps, and NL teams wore blue caps. Each cap had their teams' respective logo and a piece of the American flag, which was surrounded by a star. The Blue Jays wore a red cap with a maple leaf.
- Each player participating in the All-Star Game (representing each of the 30 clubs from both leagues) wore a team-designated cap that was inspired by the 1970s-era batting helmet of the Minnesota Twins, the club hosting the All-Star Game. The caps were jointly designed by Major League Baseball and the New Era Cap Company.
- The Mets wore Spanish-language "Los Mets" uniforms July 29 and September 12.
- The Twins wore their red batting practice uniforms August 1. The jerseys did not have their last name on the backs.
- The Tigers wore Spanish-language "Tigres" uniforms August 2. The jerseys were based on the 1960 Tigers home uniforms, which had the Tigers name in script and the player's number on it.
- The Brewers wore Spanish-language "Cerveceros" uniforms August 10.
- The Reds wore Irish Heritage night uniforms September 5. The uniforms' numbers and letters were green. The uniforms had the "Reds" script wordmark on them, instead of the player's number and the Reds' logo. A shamrock was on the uniform sleeves.
- The Reds wore Spanish-language "Los Rojos" uniforms September 7.
- All 30 teams wore caps with the flag of the United States on the left side on September 11, the thirteenth anniversary of the terrorist attacks. The Blue Jays' caps had both the U.S. and Canadian flags.
- The Orioles wore uniforms with a Red, White and Blue "Baltimore" wordmark September 14, the 200th anniversary of Francis Scott Key writing The Star-Spangled Banner.
- The Diamondbacks wore black Spanish-language "Los D-Backs" uniforms September 27.

== Television ==
=== National ===
==== United States ====
This was the first year of the new eight-year television contracts with ESPN, Fox Sports, and TBS. ESPN aired Sunday night games, some Monday Night games and Wednesday night games, while Fox Sports aired Saturday games and TBS aired Sunday games.

Contract provisions in ESPN's contract virtually eliminated local blackouts among the network's Monday and Wednesday night games, allowing ESPN coverage to co-exist with that of the local broadcasters in home markets. Sunday Night Baseball blackout rules still applied.

Fox Sports' contract also covered Fox Sports 1, which began its first year of Major League Baseball coverage. Fox Sports 1 televised 40 regular-season games (mostly on Saturdays) and possibly up to 15 playoff games. The increase in televised games from previous years was due to a provision in the contract that allowed for Fox Sports 1 to take a game between two teams in which Fox operated the teams' individual RSNs and elevated it into a national broadcast. As a result, MLB regular season coverage on the Fox network was reduced to 12 weeks beginning in 2014.

In the post-season, TBS and ESPN aired two Wild Card Games. TBS, Fox Sports 1 and MLB Network aired the Division Series, while TBS aired the American League Championship Series. The Fox network and Fox Sports 1 aired the National League Championship Series, and the Fox network exclusively aired the All-Star Game and the World Series.

==== Canada ====
This was the first year of eight-year contracts for national broadcasts in Canada. Sportsnet, owned by Rogers Communications (and sister company of the Toronto Blue Jays), continues to be the primary rightsholder, retaining rights to the All-Star Game, the Home Run Derby, and most postseason games. In total (including Canada-wide rights to all Blue Jays games which are acquired directly from the team), Sportsnet's various channels will carry almost 300 MLB games per season until 2021. As part of the deal, Rogers Cable became the Canadian launch partner for MLB Network, which was not previously available in Canada, and did not secure carriage on any Canadian providers other than Rogers that year. Despite this, MLB Network's Division Series telecasts were kept exclusive to that channel in Canada as well.

Separately, TSN announced its own eight-year deal to expand its MLB coverage. Having carried ESPN's Sunday Night Baseball since 2010 under sublicense from Sportsnet, TSN and TSN2 will now carry all of ESPN's regular-season coverage (ESPN being a minority partner in TSN), adding Monday Night Baseball and Wednesday Night Baseball, totalling over 75 games per year.

French-language rights, previously held exclusively by TSN's French-language sister channels RDS and RDS2, will now be split with TVA Sports, with each group airing approximately 70 games per season (TVA Sports also carries additional Blue Jays games acquired directly from the team). RDS will continue to carry the All-Star Game and the World Series, but the remaining postseason rights will be split equally between RDS and TVA Sports.

=== Local ===
- Los Angeles Dodgers games moved to the new Time Warner Cable SportsNet LA, which is equally owned between the Dodgers' ownership group and Time Warner Cable.
- As part of their new 25-year deal with existing rights partner Comcast SportsNet Philadelphia, over-the-air Philadelphia Phillies telecasts moved from MyNetworkTV affiliate WPHL-TV to CSN Philadelphia's sister broadcast station WCAU-TV (Philadelphia's NBC owned-and-operated station), which are both owned by Comcast.

== Radio ==
ESPN Radio aired its 17th season of national coverage, including Sunday night games, Saturday games, Opening Day and holiday games, the All-Star Game and Home Run Derby, and the entire postseason.

=== Local ===
The New York Yankees left WCBS, which was their radio home for 12 years, but the rights remained with CBS Radio's New York cluster, as they moved to WCBS's sister station WFAN with a new rights agreement, which allows an FM simulcast with WFAN-FM, which would mark the first time the Yankees are heard on FM radio in their hometown. The move to WFAN means that the New York Mets moved to WOR (purchased by Clear Channel in late 2012) for the 2014 season, as they had been on WFAN since the station had adopted the all-sports format in 1987.

This will be the final year in which the Chicago Cubs will air on WGN. WGN has had some form of broadcast relationship with the Cubs since 1925 and has been the exclusive broadcaster of the team since 1958; for many years, the Cubs and WGN were both owned by Tribune Company. The spin-off of the Cubs to new ownership, combined with continued financial losses, the Cubs' persistent on-field futility and the pending end of the rival Chicago White Sox's contract with WSCR after the 2015 season, prompted Tribune to end its relationship with the Cubs. Cubs broadcasts will move to CBS Radio's WBBM for 2015 and, if the White Sox do not renew with WSCR, to WSCR for 2016 and beyond.

== Retirements ==
- Paul Konerko announced that 2014 would be his last season.
- Derek Jeter announced that 2014 would be his last season.
- Jason Bay announced his retirement on March 31.
- Darnell McDonald announced his retirement on April 5.
- Joe Blanton announced his retirement on April 13.
- Jason Bartlett announced his retirement on April 19.
- Clay Hensley announced his retirement on April 27.
- Matt Treanor announced his retirement on May 8.
- Chris Getz announced his retirement on May 15.
- Eric Chavez announced his retirement on July 30.
- Jesse Litsch announced his retirement on August 21.
- Carlos Zambrano, although he had not pitched since the 2012 season, officially announced his retirement on September 5.
- Bobby Abreu announced his retirement on September 26.
- Adam Dunn announced his retirement on September 30.
- Fernando Tatís officially announced his retirement on October 3. He had last played in the majors in 2010.
- Octavio Dotel announced his retirement on October 4.
- Josh Beckett announced his retirement on October 7.
- Ryan Dempster, who had not pitched during the 2014 season, announced his retirement on October 8.
- Brian Roberts announced his retirement on October 17.
- Kevin Youkilis announced his retirement on October 30.
- Alfonso Soriano announced his retirement on November 4.
- J. J. Putz announced his retirement on November 6.
- Josh Willingham announced his retirement on November 24.
- Kyle McClellan announced his retirement on December 4.
- John McDonald announced his retirement on January 7, 2015.
- Jamey Carroll announced his retirement on January 12, 2015.
- Arthur Rhodes announced his retirement on January 16, 2015, though he has not pitched in the majors since the 2011 season.
- Jason Giambi announced his retirement on February 16, 2015.
- Mark Ellis announced his retirement on February 25, 2015.
- Juan Pierre, who did not play during the 2014 season, announced his retirement on February 27, 2015.
- Michael Taylor announced his retirement on March 10, 2015.
- Dontrelle Willis, who has not appeared in the majors since 2011, announced his retirement on March 13, 2015, during his comeback attempt.
- Heath Bell announced his retirement on March 24, 2015, a day after being released from the Washington Nationals.
- John Buck announced his retirement on March 26, 2015.

== Retired numbers ==
- Todd Helton of the Colorado Rockies had his #17 retired by the team on August 17 against the Cincinnati Reds. He became the first player to have his number retired by the Rockies.
- Joe Torre, manager of the New York Yankees from 1996 to 2007, had his #6 retired by the team on August 23. This was the 17th number retired by the Yankees.

== See also ==
- 2014 Korea Professional Baseball season
- 2014 Nippon Professional Baseball season
