= Jorge Soler =

Cuban baseball player (born 1992)

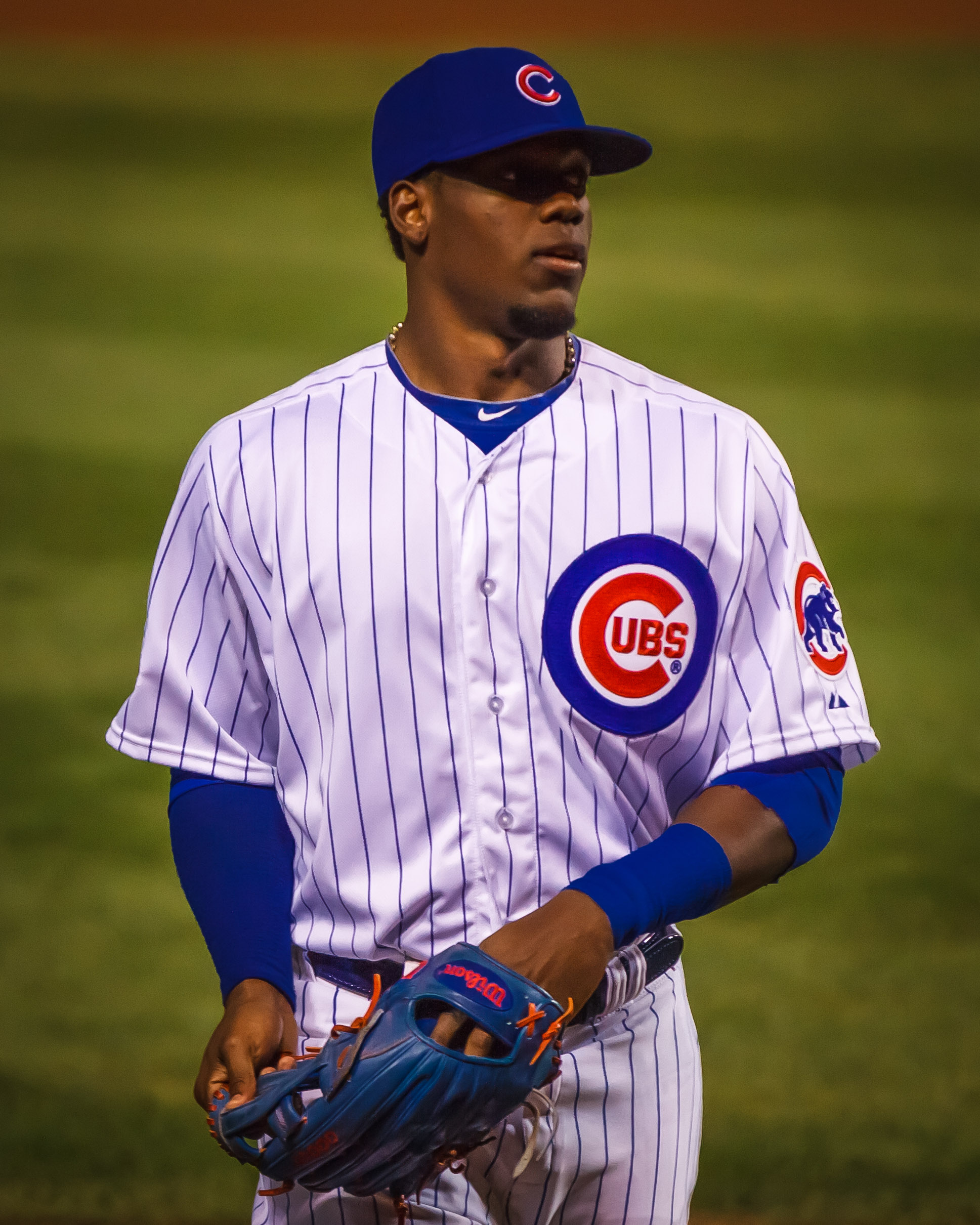
- Soler with the Chicago Cubs in 2014

Free agent
- Outfielder / Designated hitter
- Born: February 25, 1992 (age 34); Havana, Cuba
- Bats: Right Throws: Right

MLB debut
- August 27, 2014, for the Chicago Cubs

MLB statistics (through 2026 season)
- Batting average: .238
- Home runs: 215
- Runs batted in: 599
- Stats at Baseball Reference

Teams
- Chicago Cubs (2014–2016); Kansas City Royals (2017–2021); Atlanta Braves (2021); Miami Marlins (2022–2023); San Francisco Giants (2024); Atlanta Braves (2024); Los Angeles Angels (2025–2026)

Career highlights and awards
- All-Star (2023); 2× World Series champion (2016, 2021); World Series MVP (2021); AL home run leader (2019)
Medals
Men's baseball
Representing Cuba
18U Baseball World Cup
Bronze medal – third place	2010 Thunder Bay	Team

Jorge Carlos Soler Castillo (born February 25, 1992) is a Cuban professional baseball outfielder and designated hitter who is a free agent. He has previously played in Major League Baseball (MLB) for the Chicago Cubs, Kansas City Royals, Atlanta Braves, Miami Marlins, San Francisco Giants, and Los Angeles Angels.

Soler played for the Cuban national baseball team in international competition. He defected from Cuba in 2011, seeking a career in MLB. After establishing residency in Haiti, Soler signed a nine-year contract with the Cubs. He made his MLB debut in 2014 and won the 2016 World Series with the Cubs. The Cubs traded Soler to the Royals after the 2016 season. He led the American League in home runs in 2019.

Traded to Atlanta in 2021, Soler won the 2021 World Series and earned the World Series Most Valuable Player Award. Soler signed with the Marlins before the 2022 season. In 2023, he earned his first All-Star selection. Soler signed with the San Francisco Giants for the 2024 season and began the season as their designated hitter. The Giants traded Soler to the Braves during the 2024 season and the Braves traded him to the Angels after the 2024 season.

== Cuban career ==
Soler played for the Cuban national baseball team in the 2010 World Junior Baseball Championship, where he had a .304 batting average, .500 on-base percentage, and .522 slugging percentage. His nine walks were the second most in the tournament. Cuba won the bronze medal. Soler also played briefly with the Industriales in the Cuban National Series.

Soler defected from Cuba in 2011 to pursue his career in Major League Baseball (MLB). He established residency in Haiti. Soler was unblocked by the Office of Foreign Assets Control on June 2, 2012, making him an MLB free agent. As a free agent, many teams were involved in bidding on Soler.

== Scouting profile ==
Soler is 6 feet 4 inches (1.93 m) tall and weighs 215 pounds (98 kg). He was described as a power-hitting outfielder who would likely play right field. Jim Callis of Baseball America described Soler in 2011 as "a 19-year-old athlete with five-tool potential." According to Callis, Soler likely would have been a top-five pick in the 2010 draft had he been eligible. Kevin Goldstein of Baseball Prospectus did not rank Soler in his list of the top baseball prospects prior to the 2012 season, but said he would have ranked Soler as the 38th or 39th best prospect if he were eligible. Some teams preferred Soler to higher profile Cuban defector Yoenis Céspedes. Keith Law of ESPN.com indicated that Soler had the talent of a top-five draft choice in the 2012 Major League Baseball draft, had he been eligible to be drafted. Writing for Fox News, Mauricio Rubio wrote that "Early in his career he was benched for not hustling, and in a separate incident he ran toward an opposing dugout with a bat." Writing for The Sporting News, Jeff Mans noted that: "The biggest issue with Soler aside from the hamstring injuries is his temper.... He started out on the wrong foot with the Cubs after failing to report to minor league camp shortly after signing his nine-year, $30 million deal, feeling that he should have been in Chicago immediately. The other scare for the Cubs brass was his relative inability to hit righthanded pitching."

According to Statcast, Soler's average launch speed was 91.39 miles per hour (147.08 km/h) in 2016.

== American career ==
=== Chicago Cubs ===
==== Minor leagues ====
On June 11, 2012, Soler reportedly agreed to a nine-year $30 million contract with the Chicago Cubs. He made his professional debut that same season with the AZL Cubs and was promoted to the Peoria Chiefs in August. In 34 games between the two teams he batted .299 with five home runs and 25 RBI.

On April 10, 2013, while playing on the Daytona Cubs, immediately following a bench-clearing incident, Soler charged the opposing Clearwater Threshers' dugout while brandishing a baseball bat. He was ejected from the game, was fined, and received a five-game suspension. Soler spent all of 2013 with Daytona, slashing .281/.343/.467 with eight home runs and 35 RBI in 55 games.

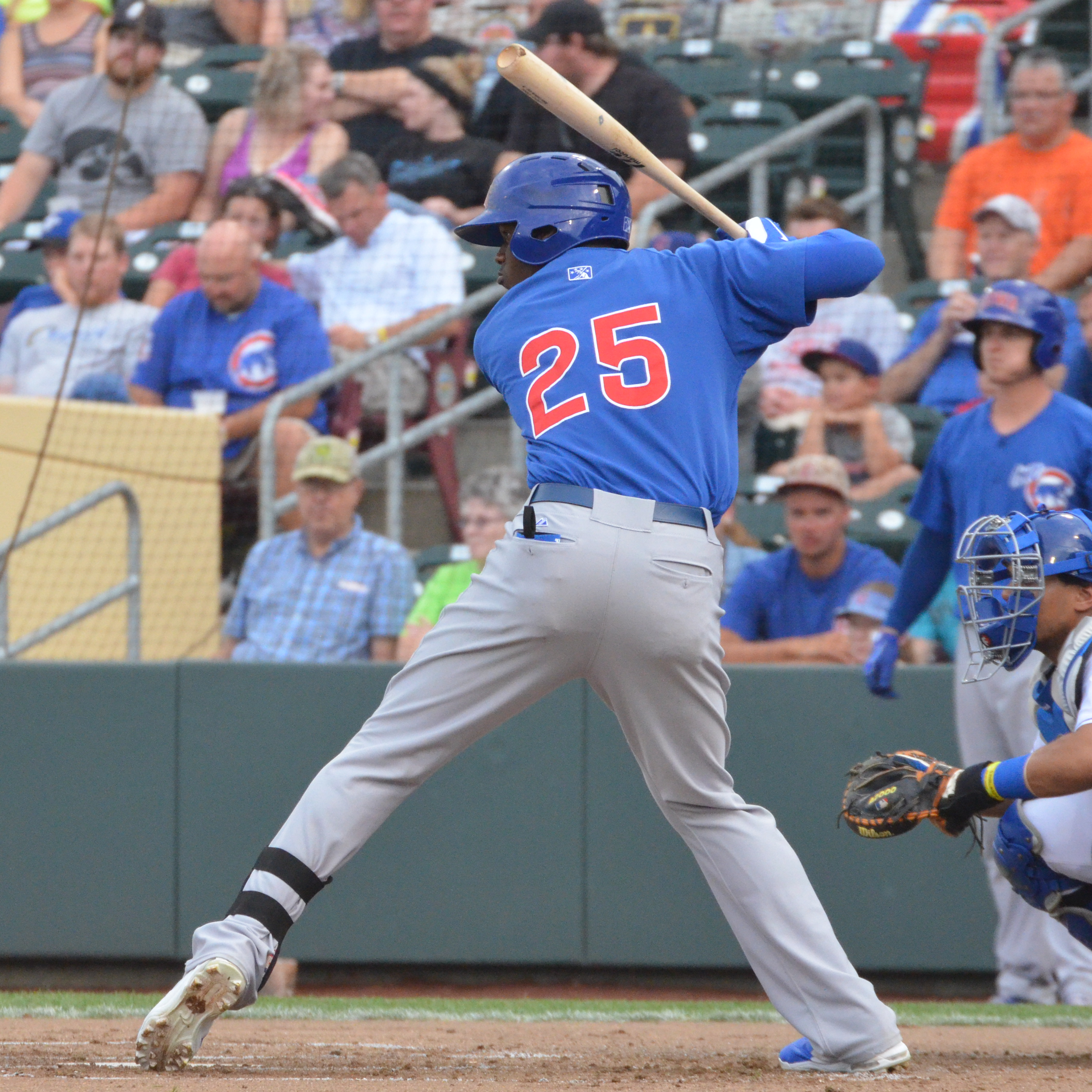
Soler batting for the Iowa Cubs in 2014

Soler began the 2014 season with the Tennessee Smokies. On July 22, 2014, after batting .415/.494/.862 with six home runs and 22 RBI in 22 games, Soler was promoted to the Iowa Cubs.

==== Major League ====
On August 25, 2014, Soler was called up to the Chicago Cubs for the first time. In 32 games for Iowa prior to his call up he was batting .282 with eight home runs and 29 RBI in 32 games. In his major league debut on August 27, facing Cincinnati Reds pitcher Mat Latos, Soler hit a home run in his first major league at-bat, becoming the 117th player in MLB history to do so. On September 1 Soler had two doubles in his home debut for the Cubs to become just the third major league player in the last 100 years to have at least one extra-base hit in each of his first five games in the majors. Two days later Soler became the second player in Cubs history with as many as 10 RBIs in his first seven games as a major leaguer. Soler was the starting right fielder for the Cubs 2015 season until an ankle injury sidelined him in early June. He returned to the starting lineup on July 5 after spending time in rehab. He finished the regular season with a .268 batting average, 15 home runs and 67 RBIs.

In 2015, Soler's postseason debut, he walked as a pinch-hitter in the ninth inning in Game 1 of the Division Series and followed up with a double, two-run home run to straightaway center and two more walks in Game 2, and another home run, a single and two walks in Game 3. Record setting Soler started his postseason career by reaching base nine times in a row, in which he recorded five walks and hit two home runs, a double and a single. In Game 4 Soler ended a game-tying St. Louis Cardinals sixth inning rally with an outfield assist on a game-saving inning-ending put out of Tony Cruz at home plate. The Cubs won the game 6–4 and beat the rival St. Louis Cardinals in four games to advance to the National League Championship Series.

Soler's playing time with Chicago dipped in 2016, playing in 86 games compared to 101 the previous year. The Cubs were the most dominant team for the entirety of the regular season, entering the postseason as the favorites. Through 13 at-bats in the playoffs, Soler totaled 4 strikeouts, 3 walks, and two hits. Both of his hits came in the World Series. The more notable of the two was a triple in Game 3 off of Bryan Shaw. The Cubs went on to win the 2016 World Series over the Cleveland Indians in seven games.

=== Kansas City Royals ===
On December 7, 2016, the Cubs traded Soler to the Kansas City Royals for Wade Davis. In April of that season, Soler wore a Cubs uniform to receive his 2016 World Series ring with Travis Wood and Jason Hammel in Wrigley Field. After a string of injuries and inconsistency at the plate, Soler was demoted to the Omaha Storm Chasers on June 2. In 74 games for Omaha he batted .267 with 24 home runs and 59 RBIs, and in 35 games for Kansas City, he compiled a .144 batting average with two home runs and six RBIs.

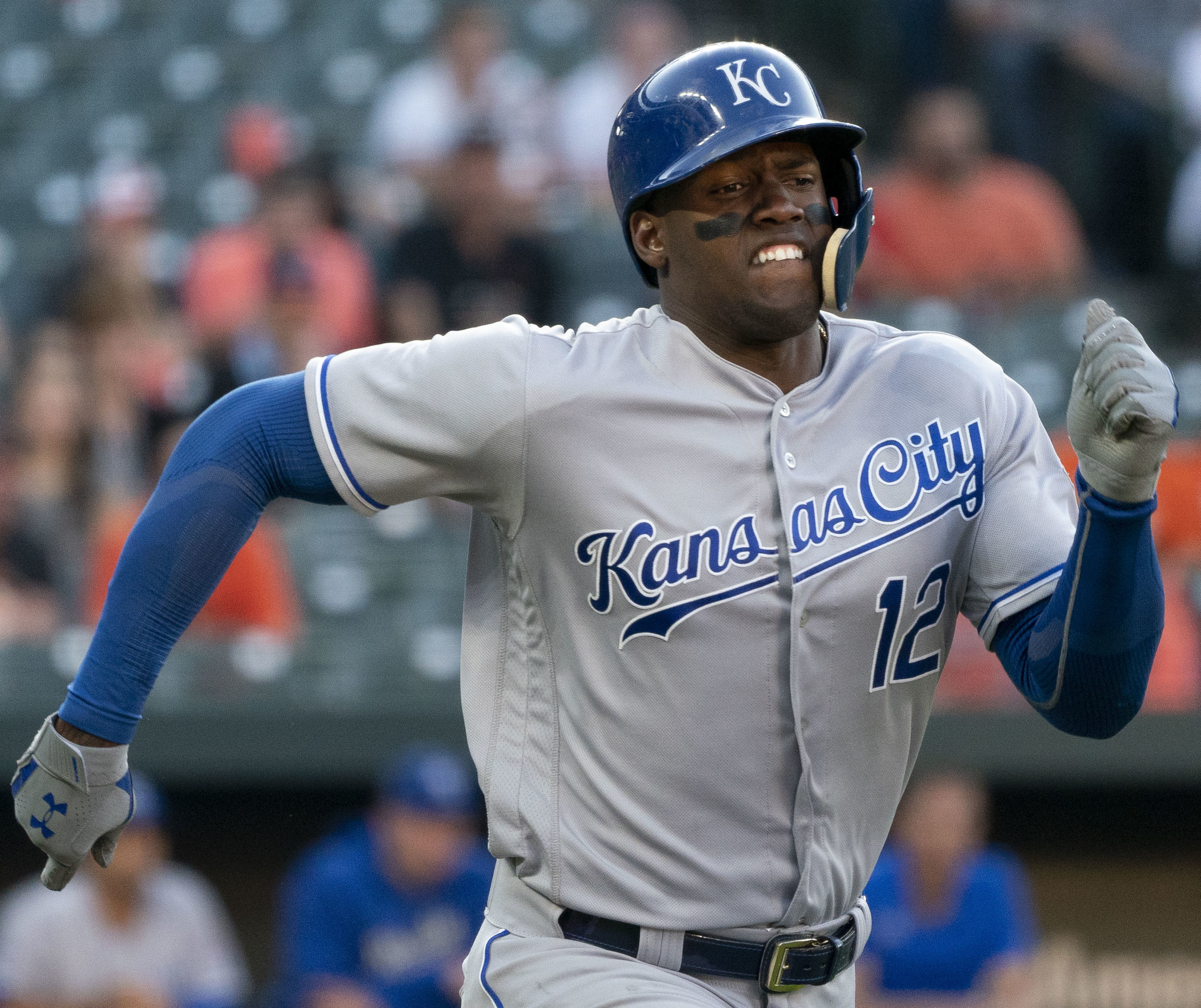
Soler in 2018

Soler began the 2018 season as Kansas City's starting right fielder. However, after suffering a toe fracture in mid-June, he was sidelined for the remainder of the year. Over 61 games, he hit .265 with nine home runs. Soler returned from the injury in 2019, splitting time between right field and designated hitter. On September 3, 2019, he hit his 39th home run of the season, becoming Kansas City's record holder for most home runs in a single season. The following night, Soler became the first Royals player in history to record at least 40 home runs in a single season.

In 2019, he batted .265, and led the American League with 48 home runs and 178 strikeouts in 589 at bats. His home run total was the most ever in a single season by a Cuban-born player. It remains the Royals' single season home run record (a tally now shared with Salvador Perez).

In the 2020 pandemic-shortened season, Soler batted .228 with eight home runs and 24 RBIs in 43 games. At the beginning of the 2021 season with Kansas City, he batted .192/.288/.370 in 308 at bats.

=== Atlanta Braves ===
On July 30, 2021, Soler was traded to the Atlanta Braves for Kasey Kalich.

In 2021, he batted .223/.316/.432 with 27 home runs and 70 RBIs in 516 at bats between the Royals and the Braves. With the Braves, he hit .269/.358/.524. His home runs averaged 423 feet, the longest average home run distance of all major league hitters.

In his first start after spending 10 days on the COVID-19 injured list, Soler hit a leadoff home run in Game 1 of the 2021 World Series off of Framber Valdez, becoming the first player to hit a home run in the first plate appearance of a World Series. (Note: Several players had homered in their first plate appearance after having played the field. Soler became the first to homer in the top of the first inning, before having played defensively, thus becoming the first to homer in his first "appearance", as opposed to "first plate appearance".) In Game 4, Soler hit a pinch-hit go-ahead home run in the seventh inning to give the Braves a 3–2 lead, which led them to a 3–1 lead in the World Series. In Game 6, he hit his third home run of the series, a 446-foot, three run shot to give the Braves a 3–0 lead. Soler was named the World Series MVP for his performance in the Braves' six-game victory, becoming the second Cuban-born player to win the award after Liván Hernández.

=== Miami Marlins ===
On March 22, 2022, Soler signed a three-year, $36 million contract with the Miami Marlins. In 2023, he was named to the National League's roster for the MLB All-Star Game. Soler batted .269 with 36 home runs and 75 RBI in 2023. He opted out of his contract and became a free agent following the 2023 season.

=== San Francisco Giants ===
On February 18, 2024, Soler signed a three-year, $42 million contract with the San Francisco Giants. In 93 games for San Francisco, Soler slashed .240/.330/.419 with 12 home runs and 40 RBI.

=== Atlanta Braves (second stint) ===
On July 29, 2024, the Giants traded Soler and Luke Jackson to the Atlanta Braves in exchange for Tyler Matzek and Sabin Ceballos. In 49 games for the Braves, Soler slashed .243/.356/.493 with nine home runs and 24 RBI.

=== Los Angeles Angels ===
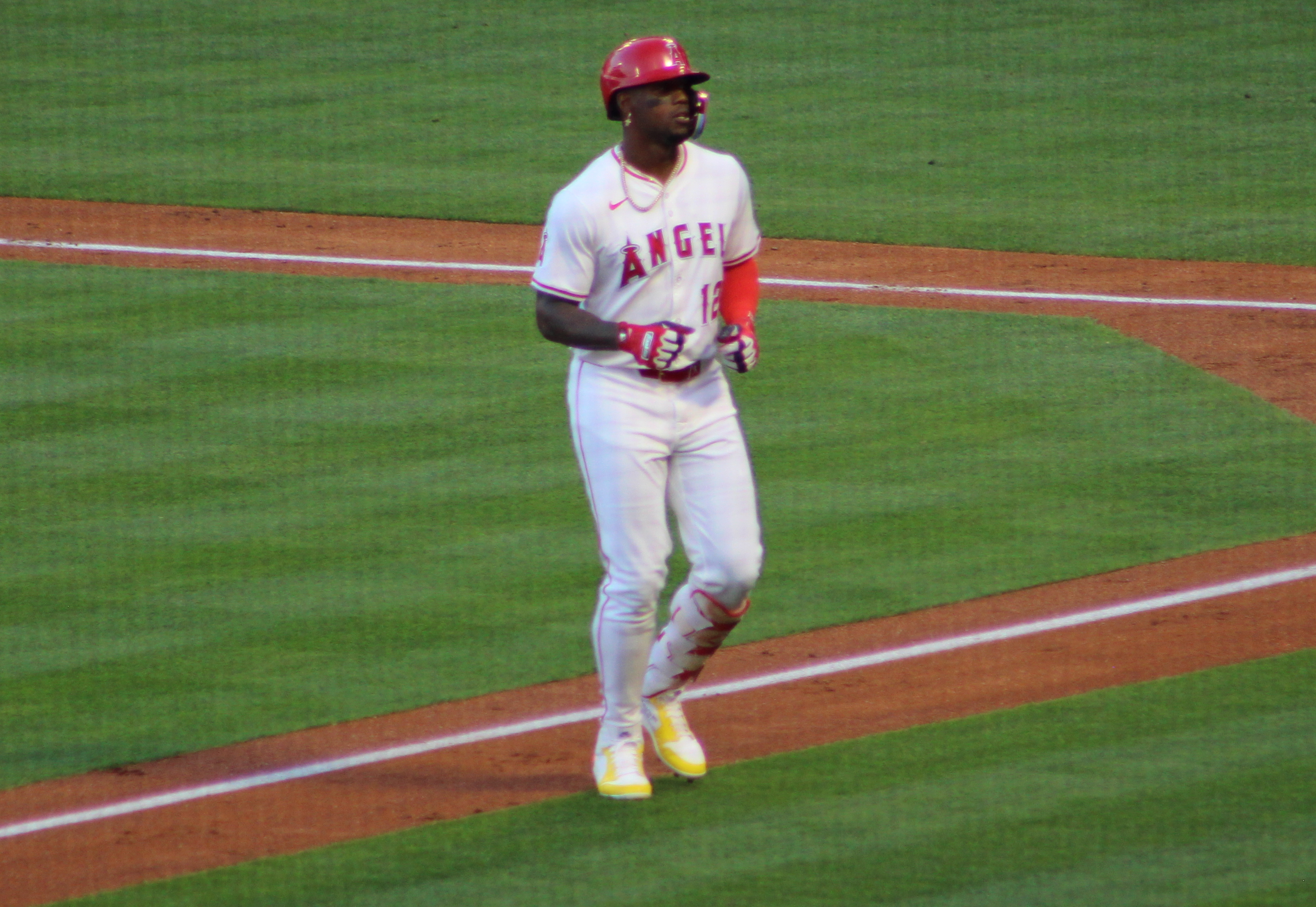
Soler in May 2025

On October 31, 2024, Soler was traded to the Los Angeles Angels in exchange for Griffin Canning. In 82 appearances for Los Angeles, he batted .215/.293/.387 with 12 home runs and 34 RBI. On July 26, 2025, Soler was placed on the injured list due to low back inflammation. He was transferred to the 60-day injured list on September 8.

On April 7, 2026, Atlanta Braves pitcher, and former teammate, Reynaldo López, threw a pitch up to Soler, who hit a home run his first at-bat and later hit by pitch his second at bat against López. Taking exception to the pitch, both players stared each other down, before Soler eventually charged the mound. They exchanged punches, with López still holding the baseball in his right hand as he threw a punch. Soler eventually was taken down by his former bench coach and current Braves manager, Walt Weiss and catching coach, Dustin Garneau. Both players were ejected from the game due to fighting. The next day, MLB suspended Soler and López seven games. On June 6, Soler was placed on the injured list due to a left oblique strain after sitting out the previous day's game. He was activated and placed back on the major league roster on June 22. Soler made 86 appearances for Los Angeles, slashing .203/.291/.373 with 12 home runs and 49 RBI. He was designated for assignment by the Angels on August 4. He cleared waivers and was released on August 6.

== Personal life ==
Soler is married to Leydis Serrano.

On November 2, 2023, Soler was included in a lawsuit after allegedly injuring a woman with a ball he threw into the stands during an October 29, 2021 World Series game.

== See also ==
- Kansas City Royals award winners and league leaders
- List of baseball players who defected from Cuba
- List of Kansas City Royals team records
- List of Major League Baseball players from Cuba
- List of Major League Baseball players with a home run in their first major league at bat
