= List of Kansas City Royals team records =

The Kansas City Royals are a Major League Baseball (MLB) team based in Kansas City, Missouri. They have competed in the American League (AL) since the team began play in 1969, and in the AL Central division since 1994. The team's list of records includes batting and pitching records set in single games, single seasons and careers, by both the team and individual players.

== Single season records ==
=== Single season batting ===
- Batting Average: George Brett, .390 (1980)
- On-base percentage: George Brett, .454 (1980)
- Slugging Percentage: George Brett, .664 (1980)
- OPS: George Brett, 1.118 (1980)
- At Bats: Willie Wilson, 705 (1980)
- Runs: Johnny Damon, 136 (2000)
- Hits: Willie Wilson, 230 (1980)
- Total Bases: George Brett, 363 (1979)
- Doubles: Hal McRae, 54 (1977)
- Triples: Willie Wilson, 21 (1985)
- Home Runs: Jorge Soler, 48 (2019), Salvador Perez, 48 (2021)
- RBI: Mike Sweeney, 144 (2000)
- Walks: John Mayberry, 122 (1973)
- Strikeouts: Jorge Soler, 178 (2019)
- Stolen Bases: Willie Wilson, 83 (1979)
- Singles: Willie Wilson, 184 (1980)
- Runs Created: George Brett, 142 (1985)
- Extra-Base Hits: Bobby Witt Jr., 88 (2024)
- Times on Base: Mike Sweeney, 292 (2000)
- Sacrifice Hits: Tom Goodwin, 21 (1996)
- Intentional Walks: George Brett, 31 (1985)
- Grounded into Double Plays: Billy Butler, 32 (2010)
- At Bats per Strikeout: George Brett, 23.5 (1977)
- At Bats per Home Run: Bob Hamelin, 13.0 (1994)
- Outs: Carlos Beltrán, 504 (1999)
- Most times Hit By Pitch: David DeJesus, 23 (2007)

=== Single season pitching ===
- ERA: Roger Nelson, 2.08 (1972)
- Wins: Bret Saberhagen, 23 (1989)
- Losses: Paul Splittorff and Darrell May, 19 (1974, 2004)
- Won-Loss %: Larry Gura, .800 (1978)
- Saves: Greg Holland 47 2013
- WHIP: Roger Nelson, .871 (1972)
- Hits Allowed/9IP: Roger Nelson, 6.23 (1972)
- Walks/9IP: Doug Bird, 1.41 (1976)
- Strikeouts/9IP: Kevin Appier, 8.82 (1996)
- Games: Dan Quisenberry, 84 (1985)
- Innings: Dennis Leonard, 294 2/3 (1978)
- Strikeouts: Dennis Leonard, 244 (1977)
- Games Started: Dennis Leonard, 40 (1978)
- Complete Games: Dennis Leonard, 21 (1977)
- Shutouts: Roger Nelson, 6 (1972)
- Home Runs Allowed: Jordan Lyles, 39 (2023)
- Walks Allowed: Mark Gubicza, 120 (1987)
- Hits Allowed: Steve Busby, 284 (1974)
- Strikeout to Walk: Bret Saberhagen, 4.49 (1989)
- Earned Runs Allowed: José Lima, 131 (2005)
- Wild Pitches: Dan Reichert, 18 (2000)
- Batters Faced: Steve Busby, 1,220 (1974)
- Games Finished: Dan Quisenberry, 76 (1985)

== Career records ==
=== Career batting ===
- Batting Average: George Brett, .305
- On-base percentage: Kevin Seitzer, .380
- Slugging Percentage: Danny Tartabull, .518
- OPS: Danny Tartabull, .894
- Games: George Brett, 2,707
- At Bats: George Brett, 10,349
- Runs: George Brett, 1,583
- Hits: George Brett, 3,154
- Total Bases: George Brett, 5,044
- Doubles: George Brett, 665
- Triples: George Brett, 137
- Home Runs: Salvador Perez, 318
- RBI: George Brett, 1,595
- Walks: George Brett, 1,096
- Strikeouts: Frank White, 1,035
- Stolen Bases: Willie Wilson, 612
- Singles: George Brett, 2,035
- Runs Created: George Brett, 1,892
- Extra-Base Hits: George Brett, 1,119
- Times on Base: George Brett, 4,283
- Hit By Pitch: Mike Macfarlane, 78
- Sacrifice Hits: Frank White, 101
- Sacrifice Flies: George Brett, 120
- Intentional Walks: George Brett, 229
- Grounded into Double Plays: George Brett, 235
- At Bats per Strikeout: Cookie Rojas, 13.0
- At Bats per Home Run: Steve Balboni, 16.8
- Outs: George Brett, 7,673

=== Career pitching ===
- ERA: Dan Quisenberry, 2.55
- Wins: Paul Splittorff, 166
- Won-Loss%: Al Fitzmorris, .593
- WHIP: Bret Saberhagen, 1.134
- Hits Allowed/9IP: Jeff Montgomery, 8.05
- Walks/9IP: Dan Quisenberry, 1.36
- Strikeouts/9IP: Tom Gordon, 7.82
- Games: Jeff Montgomery, 686
- Saves: Jeff Montgomery, 304
- Innings: Paul Splittorff, 2,554 2/3
- Strikeouts: Kevin Appier, 1,458
- Games Started: Paul Splittorff, 392
- Complete Games: Dennis Leonard, 103
- Shutouts: Dennis Leonard, 23
- Home Runs Allowed: Dennis Leonard, 202
- Walks Allowed: Mark Gubicza, 783
- Hits Allowed: Paul Splittorff, 2,644
- Strikeout to Walk: Bret Saberhagen, 3.30
- Losses: Paul Splittorff, 143
- Earned Runs Allowed: Paul Splittorff, 1,082
- Wild Pitches: Mark Gubicza, 107
- Hit Batsmen: Mark Gubicza, 58
- Batters Faced: Paul Splittorff, 10,824
- Games Finished: Jeff Montgomery, 543

== Team records ==
=== Team batting ===
- Highest team batting average: .288 in 2000
- Lowest team batting average: .240 in 1969
- Highest team slugging average: .436 in 1977
- Highest team on-base percentage: .348 in 1999
- Total Hits: 1,644 in 2000
- Extra-base hits: 522 in 1977
- Hits in a game: 27 vs. Toronto on September 19, 2025
- Longest individual hitting streak: 31, Whit Merrifield 2018-19
- Most .300 hitters in a single season: 4 in 2000
- Home runs: 168 in 1987
- Home runs in a month: 12, John Mayberry, July 1975 and Chili Davis, August 1997 and Salvador Perez, August 2021
- Most strikeouts: 1,091 in 2009

=== Team pitching ===
- Lowest team ERA: 3.21 in 1976
- Highest team ERA: 5.65 in 2006
- Most complete games: 54 in 1974
- Fewest complete games: 2 in 2007, 2008, and 2011
- Most strikeouts: 1,153 in 2009
- Fewest strikeouts: 593 in 1983
- Most walks: 693 in 2000
- Fewest walks: 433 in 1984
- Games no walks: 17 in 1992 and 1996
- Most hits: 1,648 in 2006
- Fewest hits: 1,301 in 1971
- Most runs: 971 in 2006
- Fewest runs: 566 in 1971
- Most saves: 50 in 1984
- Fewest saves: 17 in 1974

== Single game records ==
=== Single game batting ===
==== Single game batting: team ====
- Most Hits: 27 on September 19, 2025
- Runs Scored: 26 on September 9, 2004
- Most Home Runs: 7 on May 4, 2025
- Most Total Bases: 43 on September 19, 2025
- Walks Recorded: 15 on September 4, 1975
- Most Strikeouts: 18 on August 25, 1998
- Most Stolen Bases: 8 on August 1, 1998

==== Single game batting: individual ====
- Most Hits: 6 by Bob Oliver (1969), Kevin Seitzer (1987), and Joe Randa (2004)
- Most Runs Scored: 6 by Joe Randa on September 9, 2004
- Most Home Runs: 3 (8 times)
- Most RBI: 9 by Mike Moustakas on September 12, 2015
- Most Walks: 5 by Alex Gordon on July 30, 2008
- Most Strikeouts: 5 by Bo Jackson (1987), Greg Gagne (1993), and Bob Hamelin (1995)
- Most Stolen Bases: 5 by Amos Otis on September 7, 1971
- Most Total Bases: 15 by Kendrys Morales on September 20, 2015

=== Single game pitching ===
==== Single game pitching: team ====
- Most Pitchers Used: 8 on September 7, 1975
- Most Strikeouts: 17 on August 1, 2016
- Most Walks: 14 (4 times)
- Most Home Runs Allowed: 6 (8 times)
- Most Hit Batsmen: 4 (5 times)

==== Single game pitching: individual ====
- Most Strikeouts: 16 by Danny Duffy on August 1, 2016
- Most Walks: 9 (3 times)
- Most Home Runs Allowed: 5 by Sean O'Sullivan on May 28, 2011
- Most Innings Pitched: 13 by Larry Gura on May 21, 1980
