= Salvador Perez =

Venezuelan baseball player (born 1990)

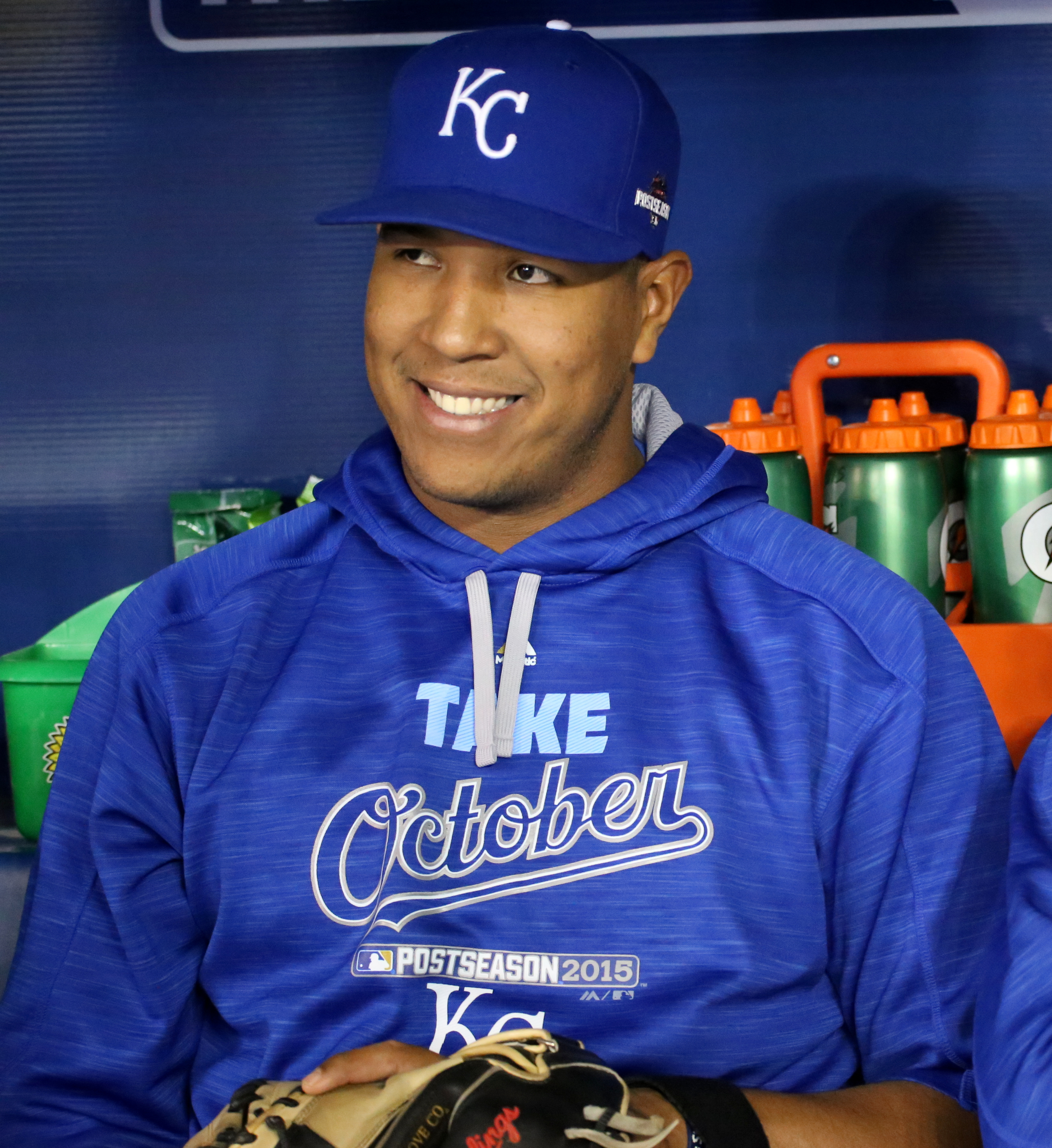
- Pérez with the Kansas City Royals in 2015

Kansas City Royals – No. 13
- Catcher / Designated hitter / First baseman
- Born: May 10, 1990 (age 36); Valencia, Venezuela
- Bats: Right Throws: Right

MLB debut
- August 10, 2011, for the Kansas City Royals

MLB statistics (through 2026 season)
- Batting average: .261
- Home runs: 324
- Runs batted in: 1,094
- Stats at Baseball Reference

Teams
- Kansas City Royals (2011–2018, 2020–present)

Career highlights and awards
- 9× All-Star (2013–2018, 2021, 2023, 2024); World Series champion (2015); World Series MVP (2015); 2× All-MLB First Team (2020, 2021); 5× Gold Glove Award (2013–2016, 2018); 5× Silver Slugger Award (2016, 2018, 2020, 2021, 2024); AL Comeback Player of the Year (2020); Roberto Clemente Award (2024); MLB home run co-leader (2021) (Note: Tied with Vladimir Guerrero Jr.); MLB RBI leader (2021)
Medals
Men's baseball
Representing Venezuela
World Baseball Classic
Gold medal – first place	2026 Miami	Team

Salvador Johan Perez Diaz (born May 10, 1990), nicknamed "El Niño" and "Salvy", is a Venezuelan-American professional baseball catcher, designated hitter, and first baseman for the Kansas City Royals of Major League Baseball (MLB). He is a nine-time MLB All-Star, five-time Gold Glove Award winner, five-time Silver Slugger Award winner, three-time All-MLB selection, Roberto Clemente Award winner, and received the World Series Most Valuable Player Award when the Royals won the 2015 World Series. Perez has played his entire career with the Royals, and was named the team's captain in 2023.

Perez played catcher almost exclusively for the first eleven years of his career before problems with his knees required him to spend time away from the position in favor of first base and designated hitter starting in 2023.

From 2021 to 2025, Perez held the single-season MLB record for most home runs by a primary catcher with 48, until he was surpassed by the Seattle Mariners' Cal Raleigh. The mark is tied for the Royals' single season home run record (alongside Jorge Soler). He also holds the Royals' franchise record for career home runs (319), and is one of eight primary catchers in MLB history to hit 300 home runs.

Internationally, Perez represents Venezuela. At the 2026 World Baseball Classic, he was captain of the team which won Venezuela's first WBC championship.

== Early life ==
Perez was born in Valencia, Carabobo, Venezuela. He was abandoned by his father at age four and raised by his mother, Yilda Díaz. When he was eight, they relocated to Valencia to live with Yilda's mother, Carmen de Díaz. Yilda supported the family by selling homemade cakes, flan, and lasagna.

To keep her only child busy, Yilda enrolled him in a baseball school in Valencia, where he showed an ability to throw, catch, and hit balls as young as age six. He played pitcher and shortstop with teams competing in state and national tournaments. At age eight, he indicated his preference to play catcher, and, at 14, set his mind to playing catcher professionally. Perez played with and against current Major Leaguer and fellow Venezuelan Jose Altuve during his childhood.

== Professional career ==
=== Minor Leagues ===
Perez signed with the Royals for $65,000 when he was 16 years old. His minor league career began in June 2007 with the Arizona Complex League Royals. In 2008 and 2009, Perez played for the Burlington Bees and Idaho Falls Chukars. In 2010, Perez was promoted to the High-A Wilmington Blue Rocks and also played for the Surprise Rafters in the Arizona Fall League. In 2011, Perez was promoted again, starting the year with the Double-A Northwest Arkansas Naturals before playing 11 games for the Triple-A Omaha Storm Chasers in July and August.

=== Kansas City Royals ===
==== 2011 ====
Perez was called up to the majors for the first time on August 10, 2011, and debuted against the Tampa Bay Rays. He picked off two baserunners and caught five popups, both uncommon occurrences for the Royals that season, and recorded his first MLB RBI in the 4th inning before getting his first hit in the 7th inning. On August 29, Perez hit his first major league home run off Max Scherzer of the Detroit Tigers. In that game, Perez was a triple away from hitting for the cycle. In his rookie year, he batted .331/.361/.473 with three home runs and 21 RBI in 39 games played.

==== 2012 ====
On February 27, Perez signed a five-year, $7 million extension that included three club options and placed him under team control through 2019. His earning potential was up to $26.75 million if he reached all of his incentives and all of his options were picked up. The extension covered his pre-arbitration seasons, two of his three arbitration-eligible years, and, if all of his options were exercised, his final arbitration year and his first two years of free agency. Perez earned $750,000 in 2012, $1 million in 2013, $1.5 million in 2014, $1.75 million in 2015 and $2 million in 2016. His options were $3.75 million in 2017, $5 million in 2018 and $6 million in 2019. His team-friendly contract ultimately lasted until he signed another extension in 2016.

While catching a bullpen session before a spring training game in 2012, Perez tore the meniscus in his left knee. He did not return until July 2. In the 2012 season, he hit .301/.328/.471 with 11 homers and 39 RBIs in 79 games played.

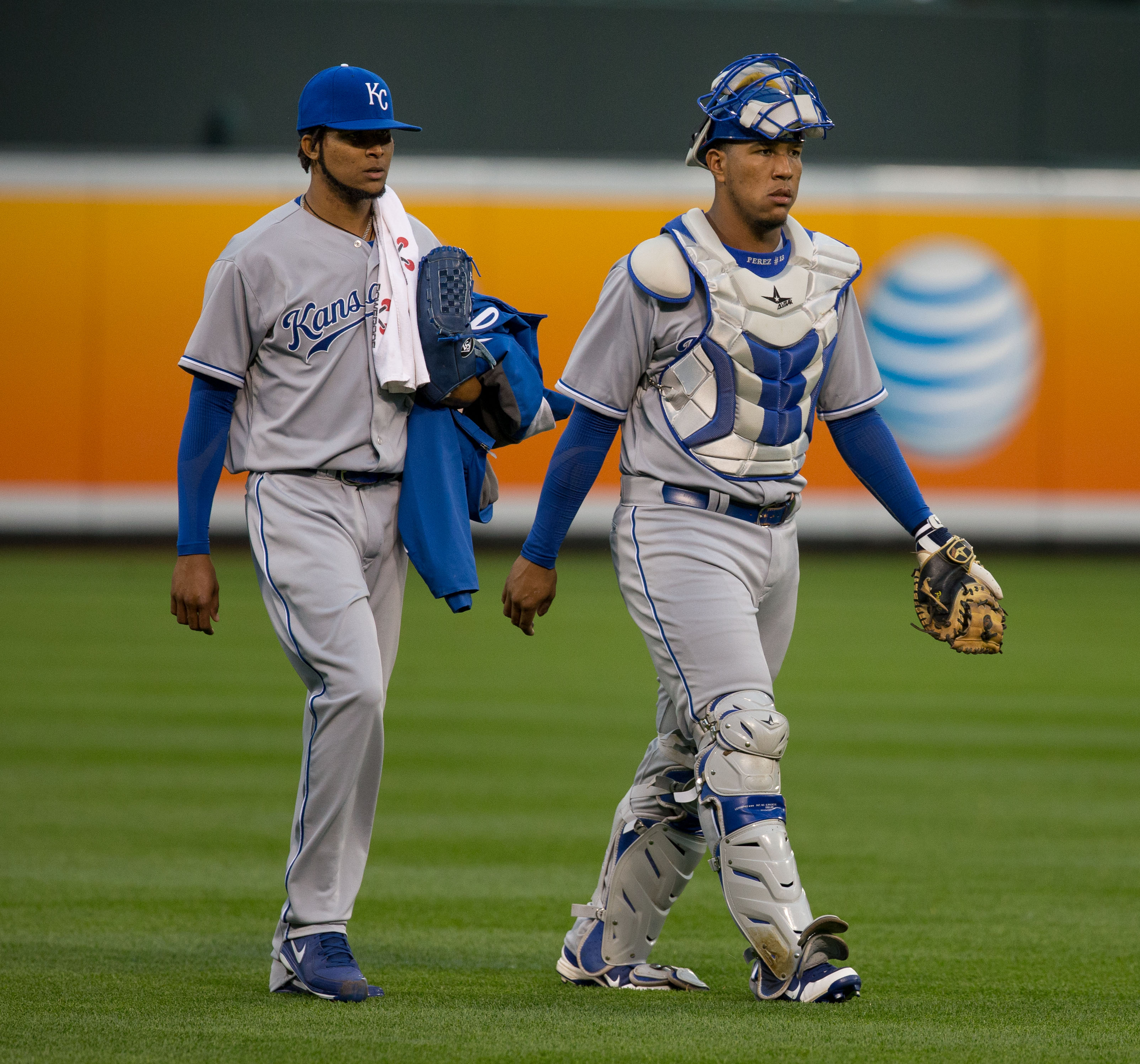
Perez (right) and Ervin Santana with the Kansas City Royals in 2013

==== 2013 ====
On July 16, Perez caught Mariano Rivera in Rivera's final All-Star Game before retirement. After the season, Perez was awarded the American League Gold Glove Award for his catching defense. He finished the year playing 138 games with a .292/.323/.433 average, 13 home runs, and 79 RBI.

==== 2014 ====
In 2014, Perez started 143 games, more than any other major league catcher. Perez played in 150 games in 2014, batting .260/.289/.403 with 28 doubles, 17 home runs, and 70 RBI.

In the 2014 American League Wild Card Game, Perez singled down the left field line in the bottom of the 12th inning, driving in the winning run as the Royals beat the Oakland Athletics 9–8.

In Game 1 of the 2014 World Series against the San Francisco Giants, Perez hit a home run off eventual series MVP Madison Bumgarner, representing the only run Bumgarner surrendered in five World Series appearances covering 36 innings. Perez was the final out of the series, popping out to Pablo Sandoval in foul territory to clinch the series for the Giants.

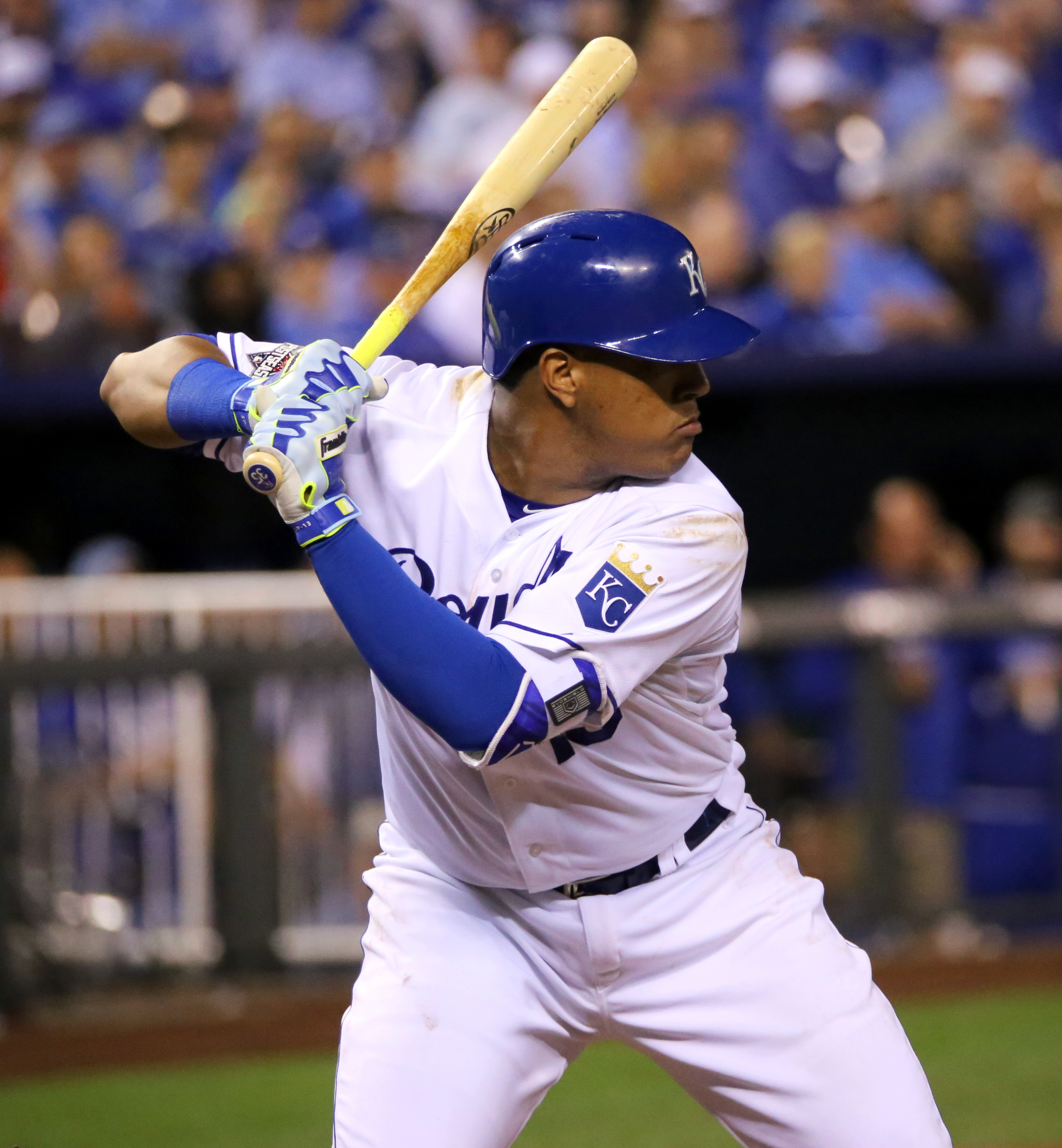
Perez batting in 2015 American League Division Series

==== 2015 ====
In 2015, Perez was voted to start in the 2015 All-Star Game, his third All-Star appearance. In the regular season, he played in 142 games while batting .260/.280/.426 with 21 home runs and 71 runs batted in. He also won his third consecutive Gold Glove Award.

Perez batted .364 in the 2015 World Series, which the Royals won in five games. In the Series-clinching win, Perez grounded to third in the ninth inning allowing the tying run in the Royals' comeback. The game continued into extra innings. In the 12th, Perez singled to right with no outs and Jarrod Dyson pinch ran for Perez. Dyson would eventually score, giving the Royals their first lead of the night. The Royals won 7–2 in the 12th inning, making them the 2015 World Series Champions. Perez was unanimously named the World Series Most Valuable Player. He is the first catcher to win the award since Pat Borders in 1992 and the second Venezuelan to win MVP, following Sandoval in 2010.

==== 2016 ====
On March 1, Perez signed a five-year extension to remain with the team through the 2021 season. Perez was named to his fifth consecutive All-Star Game as the starting catcher for the American League along with teammate Eric Hosmer. Perez would finish the 2016 season batting .247/.288/.438, hitting 22 home runs (more than any other American League catcher) and driving in 64 runs en route to his first career Silver Slugger award. He saw 3.43 pitches per plate appearance, tied for the lowest in the major leagues. He won his fourth consecutive Gold Glove award.

==== 2017 ====
Perez hit his first career grand slam on June 21, helping the Royals to a 6-4 come-from-behind win against the Boston Red Sox. On August 6, Perez was placed on the 10-day disabled list due to an intercostal strain. He played 139 games in 2017, batting .268/.297/.495 with 27 home runs and 80 RBI.

==== 2018 ====
On March 28, Perez suffered a grade 2 tear of the medial collateral ligament in his left knee while carrying a suitcase up a flight of stairs. Perez was ruled out for 4–6 weeks. Perez returned to baseball activities with a minor league rehabilitation assignment with the Northwest Arkansas Naturals and Omaha Storm Chasers on April 15, and he returned to the Royals' lineup on April 24 versus the Milwaukee Brewers. On May 10, celebrating his 28th birthday, Perez hit a grand slam, but the Royals lost to the Orioles 11–6.

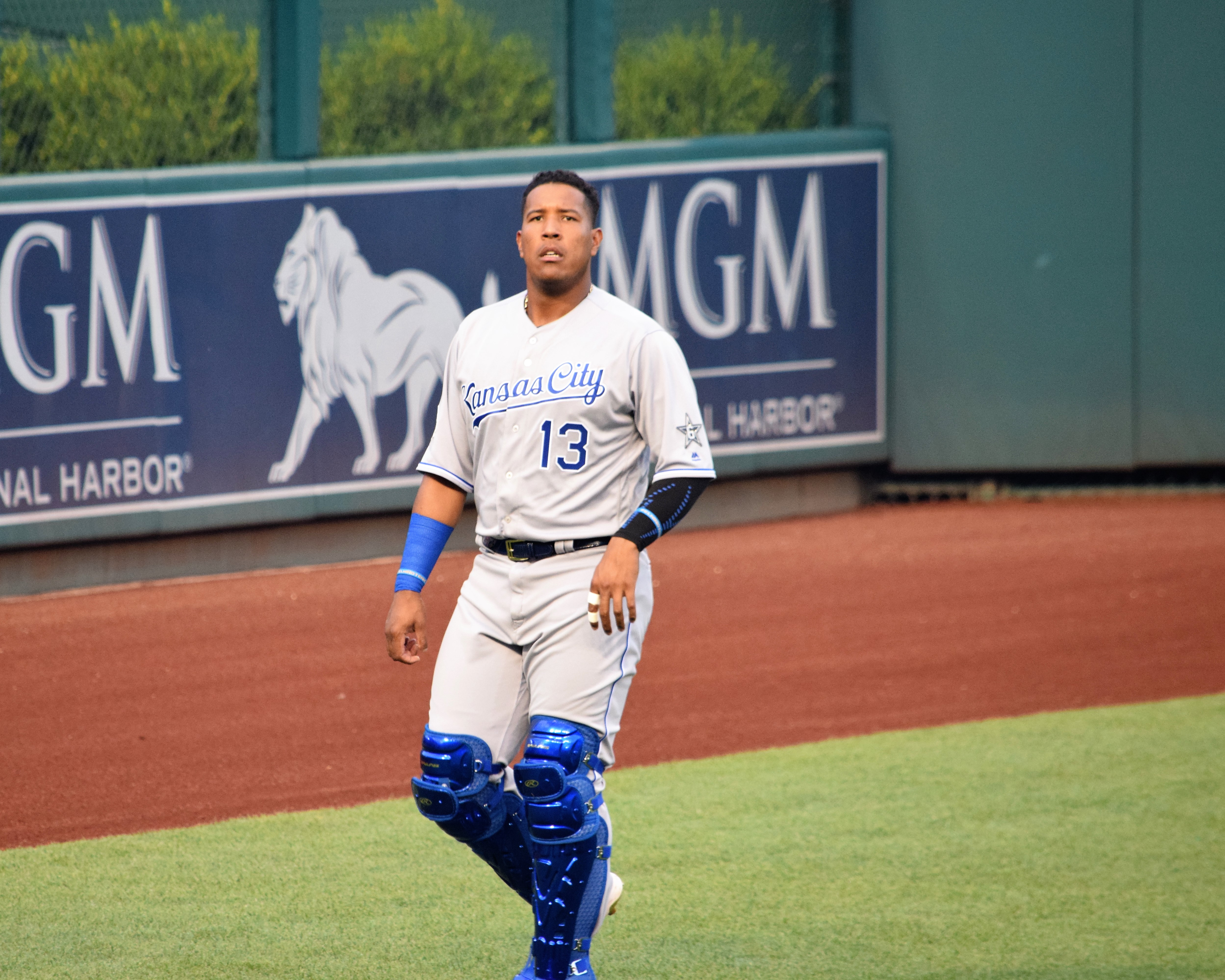
Perez at the 2018 All-Star Game

Batting .213 with 11 home runs and 34 RBIs, Perez was named to the 2018 MLB All-Star Game. On September 14, Perez hit his second grand slam of the season in the bottom of the ninth inning against the Minnesota Twins, breaking a 4–4 tie.

He finished his 2018 campaign batting .235/.274/.439 with 27 home runs and 80 RBIs. He swung at 48.4% of pitches outside the strike zone, the highest percentage in MLB. He also won his fifth Gold Glove and second Silver Slugger award.

==== 2019 ====
On February 27, Perez sustained an injury to his elbow during a workout in Surprise, Arizona. On March 1, an MRI revealed that there was a partial tear of the UCL in his right elbow. On March 6, the team announced that Perez had undergone Tommy John surgery to repair the tear and would miss the entire 2019 season.

==== 2020 ====
During the coronavirus pandemic-shortened 2020 season, Perez played in 37 of 60 games. On August 21, Perez was placed on the 10-day injured list after experiencing lingering eye problems. He was reinstated on September 11. In 2020, Perez batted .333/.353/.633 with 11 home runs and 32 RBIs, winning his third Silver Slugger award.

==== 2021 ====
On March 21, Perez agreed to a four-year, $82 million contract extension with the Royals that would keep him in Kansas City through the 2025 season. The contract was the largest in franchise history at the time. Perez would earn $18 million in 2022, $20 million in 2023 and 2024, and $22 million in the 2025 season. The contract included a $13.5 million fifth-year club option for the 2026 season or a $2 million buyout. On April 21, Perez hit a walk-off single in the bottom of the ninth inning to beat the Tampa Bay Rays 9–8. On July 11, Perez participated in the 2021 MLB Home Run Derby. On August 4, he hit his 27th home run of the season, tying his career high. On August 10, the 10th anniversary of his Major League debut, he hit two home runs against the New York Yankees to give him a new career high of 29 home runs in a season. On August 26 and 27, he hit grand slams on two consecutive nights against the Seattle Mariners. On August 29, he hit his 38th home run of the season, breaking Carlton Fisk's 1985 record for the most total home runs hit in a season by an American League player who was a primary catcher (played at least 50 percent of their games that season at catcher). He also homered in his fifth straight game, matching Mike Sweeney's franchise record set in 2002. On September 20, he hit his 46th home run of the season against the Cleveland Indians, breaking Johnny Bench's 1970 record for the most total home runs hit in a season by a primary catcher and moving him past Sweeney for second place on the all-time list for home runs as a Royal, with 198. On September 29, he tied teammate Jorge Soler for the Royals record for most home runs in a season, with 48.

Perez finished the season batting .273/.316/.544 with 48 home runs and a league-leading 121 RBIs, winning his fourth Silver Slugger award. His 48 home runs tied Vladimir Guerrero Jr. of the Toronto Blue Jays for the most in MLB, giving Perez two-thirds of the batting Triple Crown. As has been the case his whole career, Perez was a free swinger in 2021: he swung at the highest percentage of pitches outside the strike zone of all qualified major leaguers, at 48.3 percent, and the highest percentage of all pitches, at 58.9 percent. He had a career high 170 strikeouts.

==== 2022 ====
On May 17, Perez sprained his left thumb and was ruled out for ten days. On June 24, Perez had surgery on the ulnar collateral ligament in his left thumb after aggravating the earlier injury in a game versus the Los Angeles Angels on June 21. He was initially ruled out for at least eight weeks, but Royals team staff hoped he could return during the 2022 season. On July 29, Perez returned to the Royals' lineup versus the New York Yankees. He played in only 114 games in 2022, batting .254/.292/.465 with 23 home runs.

==== 2023 ====
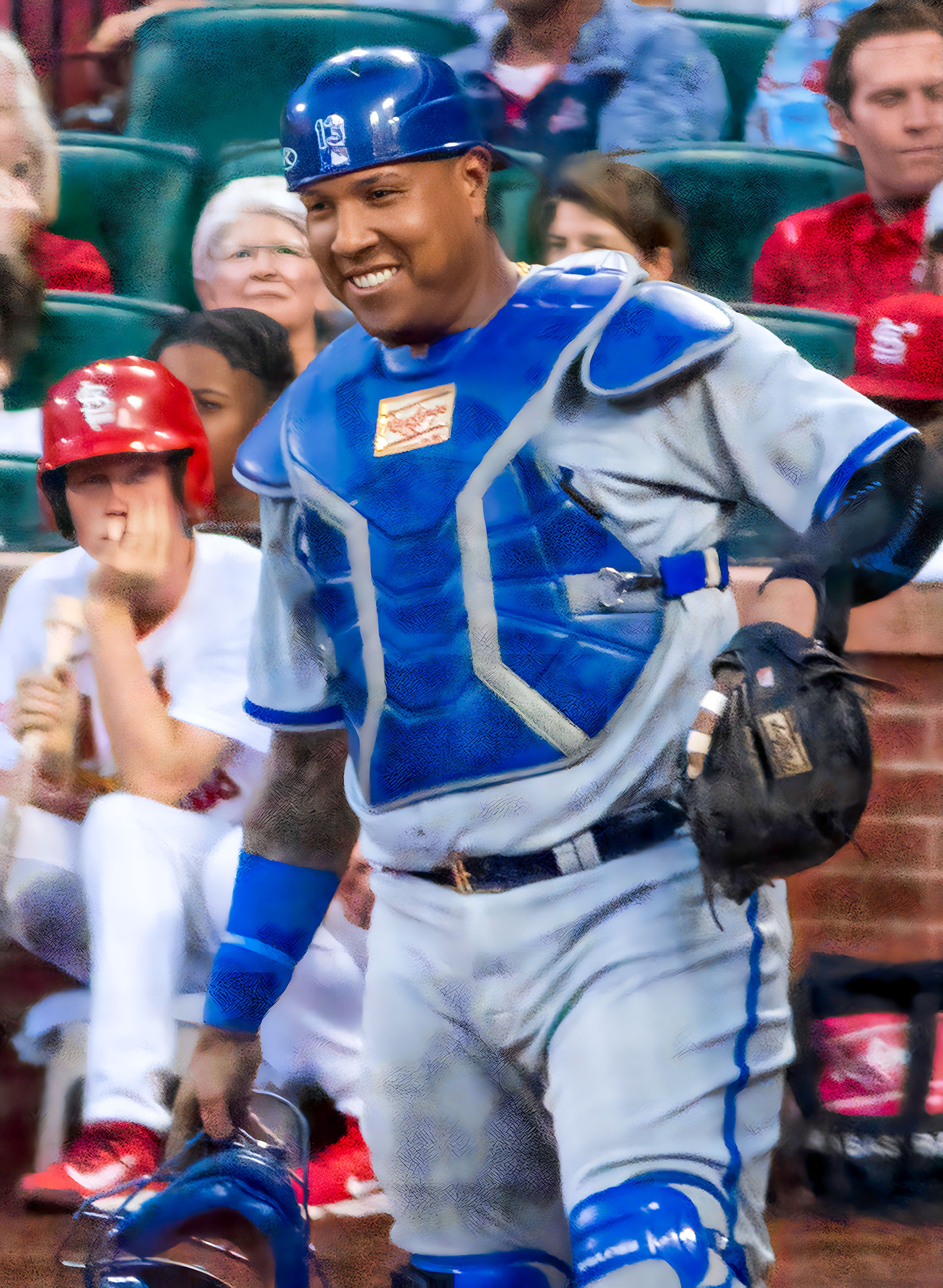
Perez in 2023

On March 30, Perez was named as the Royals' captain, becoming the fourth Royals player to receive the honor. In 2023, he walked in 3.3 percent of plate appearances, the lowest walk percentage in the AL, while batting .255/.292/.422 in 580 plate appearances with 19 walks (6 intentional) and 135 strikeouts.

==== 2024 ====
On April 13, Perez hit his 250th career home run, becoming the 12th primary catcher in AL/NL history to reach that milestone. On July 7, he earned his 1,500th base hit. He finished the season with a career high 44 walks. He batted .271/.330/.456 with 27 home runs and 104 RBI. He ranked first among all qualified American League catchers (minimum 50% games at catcher) in RBIs, on-base percentage, slugging percentage, on-base plus slugging, and extra-base hits, second in batting average and hits, and third in home runs, while winning his fifth Silver Slugger award.

Perez started all six of the Royals' postseason games and had one hit in each of the first five games, including a home run off Carlos Rodón in Game Two of the American League Division Series. He hit .208 with one extra base hit, an RBI, seven strikeouts, and one hit by pitch in 25 plate appearances.

==== 2025 ====
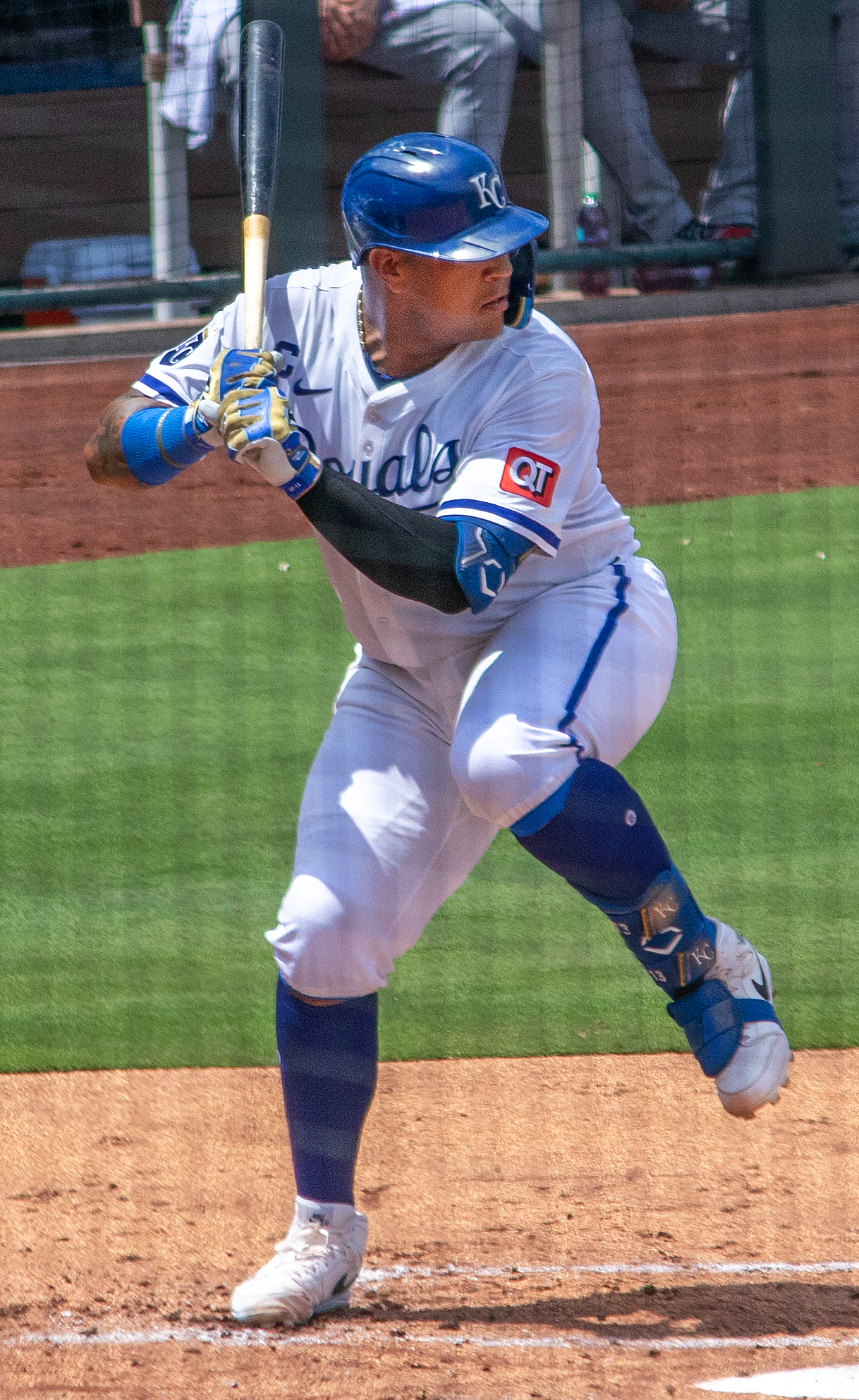
Perez in 2025

On May 21, Perez hit his 276th career home run against the San Francisco Giants, putting him in fifth place all-time in homers among catchers in the American League. On June 17, Perez hit two home runs in a 6–1 victory over the Texas Rangers. The game was Perez's 18th multi-homer game of his career, and gave him the record for most multi-homer games by a Royals player, surpassing George Brett. On June 22, Perez hit his 282nd career home run against the San Diego Padres, putting him in fourth place all-time in homers among catchers in the American League, surpassing Iván Rodríguez. On July 21, Perez hit two home runs in a 12–4 win over the Chicago Cubs. His second homer allowed him to pass Lance Parrish to reach third place all-time in homers among catchers in the American League. On September 13, Perez went 2-for-3, hit two home runs, and scored three RBI against the Philadelphia Phillies. With that performance, Perez hit his 300th career home run and recorded his 1,000th career RBI in an 8-6 Phillies victory. Due to hitting his second homer of the game, Perez becomes the eighth primary catcher in MLB to reach 300 home runs, joining Mike Piazza, Johnny Bench, Carlton Fisk, Yogi Berra, Gary Carter, Iván Rodríguez, and Lance Parrish. He also became the 13th active player to reach 300 home runs and the 10th active player to reach 1,000 RBI. And the third Royal with 1,000 RBI in franchise history, joining Hal McRae and George Brett.

==== 2026 ====
On November 4, 2025, Perez agreed to a two-year, $25 million contract extension with the Royals through the 2027 season. The first year of the contract replaced a club option in Perez's previous contract.

In the seventh inning of a July 25, 2026 game against the Detroit Tigers, Perez hit a solo home run off of Kyle Finnegan. As his 318th career home run, it gave Perez sole possession of the Royals franchise record over Brett.

== International career ==
Internationally, Perez represents Venezuela, and participated in the World Baseball Classic in four consecutive tournaments in 2013, 2017, 2023, and 2026.

In 2023, Perez slashed .429/.467/.929 with a home run, four doubles, and six RBIs en route to being named to the All-WBC team at the end of the tournament.

At the 2026 World Baseball Classic, he was named captain of the team, which won Venezuela's first WBC championship. Perez started at catcher in the championship game against the United States. He scored one of Venezuela's three runs in the game, batted in on a sacrifice fly by his Royals teammate Maikel García after hitting a single in the third inning. Later in 2026, Perez became an inductee into the Venezuelan Baseball Hall of Fame as a member of the WBC championship team.

== Personal life ==
In the offseason, Perez resides in his hometown with his wife, Maria Gabriela, sons Salvador Jr. and Johan, and daughter, Paulina. On January 24, 2020, Perez became naturalized as a U.S. citizen, taking the oath of citizenship at the Royals' annual FanFest.

Perez is known for wearing perfume during games. Near the end of the 2013 season, teammate Alcides Escobar sprayed Perez with Victoria's Secret women's perfume and told him he would get four hits, a prediction that came true. Perez's only four-hit game in 2013 was on August 28. Perez continued to wear perfume during games as a good-luck charm, switching to 212 VIP cologne by Carolina Herrera in 2014 and later Invictus by Paco Rabanne.

Perez delights fans with his positive attitude and humorous postings on social media. In the 2014 and 2015 seasons, Perez made a habit of playfully pestering teammate Lorenzo Cain by taking videos of him and posting them on Instagram. Perez is also well known for giving a Gatorade shower ("Salvy Splash") to teammates during television interviews after every home win and notable away wins.

== See also ==
- Kansas City Royals award winners and league leaders
- List of Kansas City Royals team records
- List of Major League Baseball career games played as a catcher leaders
- List of Major League Baseball annual home run leaders
- List of Major League Baseball annual runs batted in leaders
- List of Major League Baseball career putouts as a catcher leaders
- List of Major League Baseball career home run leaders
- List of Major League Baseball career hit by pitch leaders
- List of Major League Baseball career runs batted in leaders
- List of Major League Baseball players from Venezuela
