= Claire Betz =

Part-owner of the Philadelphia Phillies baseball team

Claire Smith Betz (January 11, 1921 – February 6, 2014) was a part-owner of the Philadelphia Phillies baseball team.

She inherited her part-ownership from her husband, John Betz – who bought his share of the team in 1981 – when he died in 1990. According to Bill Conlin, she had a 33% stake in the team in 2007, making her the largest stakeholder of the ownership group. She was part of the cabal of Phillies owners known as the "Phantom Five", so-called because of their reclusiveness and lack of involvement in Phillies affairs.

The Betz family made its fortunes in Betz Laboratories, a water treatment company based in Pennsylvania.

The Phillies honored Betz with the wearing of a "CB" memorial patch on their uniforms during the 2014 season.

== Personal life and other endeavors ==
Betz attended Mount Saint Joseph Academy and then Villanova University. She was a philanthropist who donated 200 acres of land to the Natural Lands Trust.
