= Mike Sweeney =

American baseball player (born 1973)

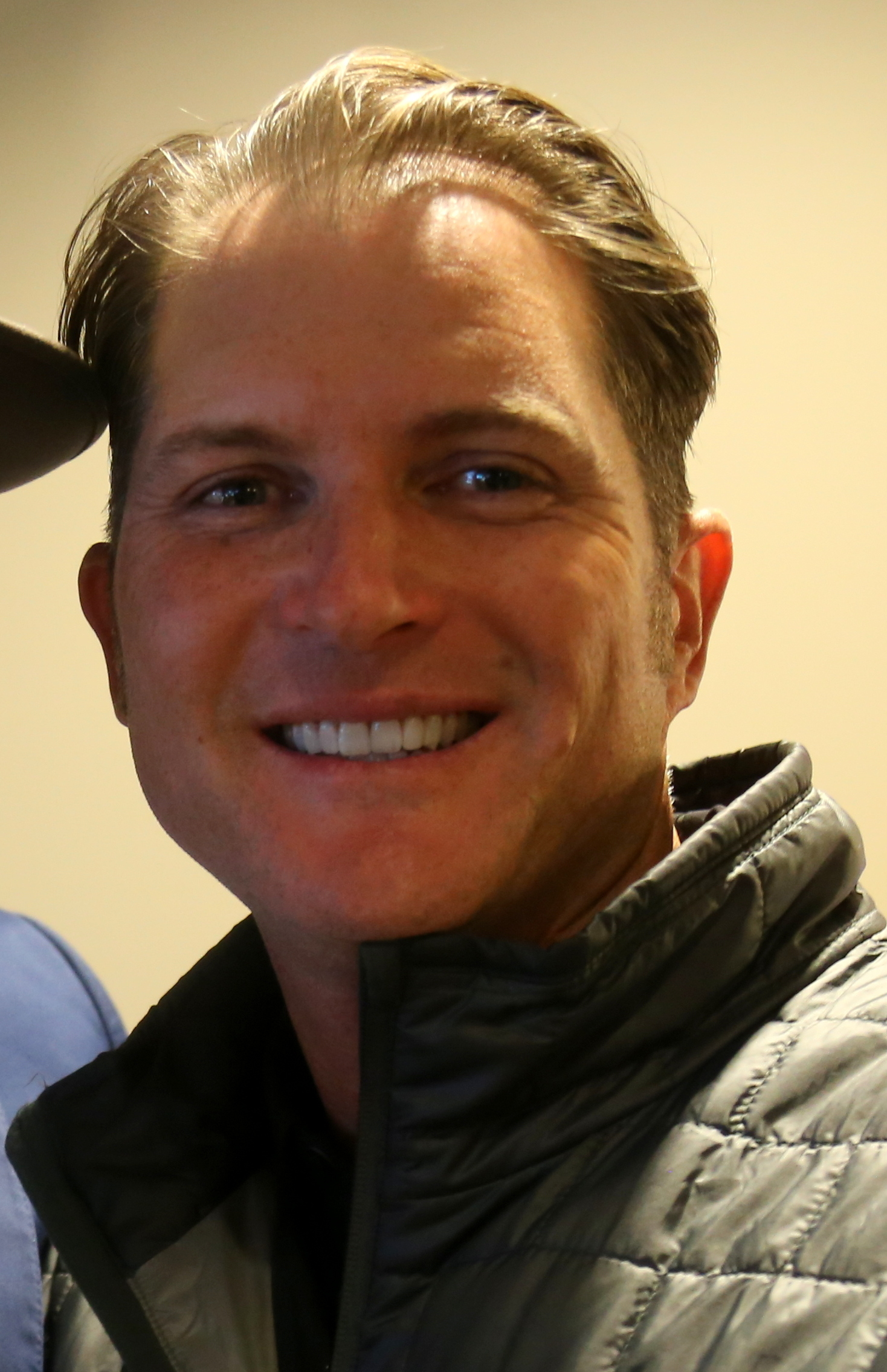
- Sweeney in 2015
- Designated hitter / First baseman / Catcher
- Born: July 22, 1973 (age 53); Orange, California, U.S.
- Batted: Right Threw: Right

MLB debut
- September 14, 1995, for the Kansas City Royals

Last MLB appearance
- October 3, 2010, for the Philadelphia Phillies

MLB statistics
- Batting average: .297
- Home runs: 215
- Runs batted in: 909
- Stats at Baseball Reference

Teams
- Kansas City Royals (1995–2007); Oakland Athletics (2008); Seattle Mariners (2009–2010); Philadelphia Phillies (2010)

Career highlights and awards
- 5× All-Star (2000–2003, 2005); Kansas City Royals Hall of Fame

Michael John Sweeney (born July 22, 1973) is an American former Major League Baseball designated hitter and first baseman. Sweeney played his first 13 seasons in the majors with the Kansas City Royals, first as a catcher, then at first base and designated hitter. Sweeney also played for the Oakland Athletics, Seattle Mariners, and Philadelphia Phillies. In March 2011, Sweeney retired from baseball. He now works as a special assistant for the Royals. Sweeney was inducted into the Royals Hall of Fame in 2015.

== Major league career ==
=== Kansas City Royals ===
==== 1991–1997: Minor leagues and MLB debut ====
Sweeney was drafted by the Royals as a catcher out of Ontario High School in Ontario, California in the 10th round (262nd overall) of the 1991 MLB draft. He signed with the Royals in May 1991, a month before his graduation from high school. He had just led his varsity baseball team as the team captain to a CIF victory with an undefeated record of 26–0 for the 1991 season.

Sweeney made his major league debut on September 14, 1995 at catcher. He got his first major league hit against Paul Assenmacher of the Cleveland Indians during the final game of the season.

While Sweeney's ability with the bat impressed the Royals, they were less than enamored with his defensive skills as a catcher, having him work with starter Mike Macfarlane on his defense.

Sweeney hit his first major league home run, off Seattle Mariners' pitcher Jamie Moyer, on August 12, 1996.

Sweeney caught 76 games in 1997, splitting time with Macfarlane. He hit a two-run, walk-off home run off Doug Brocail of the Detroit Tigers on May 15, 1997 in his only at bat of the game.

==== 1998: Primary catcher ====
In 1998, Sweeney played in his first Opening Day game. He tied a club record with two hits in an inning against the Oakland A's on May 31. Sweeney missed hitting for the cycle by approximately 40 feet, when he retreated to second base on what appeared to be a sure triple in the eighth inning with the Kansas City Royals leading by a 12–6 score. He caught 91 games, the most of his major league career, serving as the regular starter after Macfarlane was traded midseason.

==== 1999–2001 ====
Sweeney's big break came in 1999, after the Royals tried unsuccessfully to trade him during spring training. Riddled with injuries and with no other viable options, the Royals started using Sweeney as their regular designated hitter. After the sudden retirement of Jeff King, the Royals offered the first base job to rookie Jeremy Giambi. When Giambi showed reluctance, they gave the job to Sweeney, who responded by posting the highest fielding percentage by a regular first baseman in more than 20 years. His .322 batting average led the team and his 22 home runs and 102 RBI were second and third on the team, respectively. From July 18 to August 13, Sweeney had a hit in 25 consecutive games, collecting 42 hits total. The 25-game hitting streak is tied for fourth longest in Royals history with George Brett's 25-game streak in 1983, trailing only Whit Merrifield's 31-game streak spanning 2018–2019, Brett's 30-game streak in 1980 and José Offerman's 27-game streak in 1998.

In 2000, Sweeney was selected to his first of five All-Star Games. He joined Jermaine Dye to become the first pair of Royals to go to an All-Star Game since 1989 (Bo Jackson and Mark Gubicza). Sweeney passed the 100 RBI mark for the second straight year on August 13, 2000, reaching the century mark faster than any player in Royals history. He finished second in the league with a club record 144 RBI, behind only Seattle's Edgar Martínez's 145 RBI, and breaking Hal McRae's 1982 team mark of 133.

In June 2001, Sweeney hit .392 with 11 home runs and 29 RBI with a .794 slugging percentage and was named the American League (AL) Player of the Month for the only time in his career.

===== Sweeney vs. Weaver =====
Sweeney had his first career ejection against the Detroit Tigers on August 10 after charging pitcher Jeff Weaver in the sixth inning. Weaver was pitching to Sweeney. In between pitches, Sweeney asked the home plate umpire if Weaver could be asked to move the rosin bag from the top of the mound. After that, Weaver put his glove over his mouth and appeared to say something "Webster never put in his dictionary" to Sweeney. Sweeney was offended and launched his batting helmet at Weaver while charging the pitcher's mound. He eventually tackled Weaver, igniting a bench-clearing brawl. Sweeney said afterwards that Weaver had been criticizing the Royals' younger players and Sweeney's faith. Sweeney's teammates did not deny his comments. Paul Byrd was one of the first to aid Sweeney as he held back the Tigers' catcher so that Sweeney could reach Weaver. Sweeney missed the next 15 games, five due to a "bruised hand" and the next ten to serve a suspension, his first career suspension. Prior to that, he had played in 171 consecutive games.

==== 2002–2004 ====
Sweeney had one of the best seasons of his career in 2002, hitting .340, the second-highest batting average in the AL and the second-highest in club history, behind Brett's .390 in 1980. Sweeney had a chance of winning the AL batting crown through the season's final weekend but fell short of Manny Ramírez, who hit a league-best .349. Sweeney was hitting .347 on September 24 before going 2-for-16 in his final four games.

On August 14, 2002, he became the fifth Royal in club history to record a straight steal of home and the first since Fred Patek versus Minnesota on June 18, 1977, with a stolen base off the New York Yankees' Andy Pettitte. His stolen base came on a 1-2 count with left-hander Aaron Guiel at the plate and gave the Royals a 2–1 lead, but KC lost the game, 3–2, in 14 innings.

Sweeney was placed on the disabled list for the first time in his career on July 26, 2002 (retroactive to July 14) with a lower back and hip strain. He would continue to have injury problems throughout the rest of his career, including a lengthy DL stint during the 2003 season, with the Royals seeking their first winning season since the strike-shortened 1994 season, where they went 64–51.

During the 2003 season, Sweeney was named to his fourth consecutive All-Star Game, joining Royals closer Mike MacDougal, marking the first time since 2000 (Sweeney and Jermaine Dye) that Kansas had two representatives and just the second time since 1989 (Bo Jackson and Mark Gubicza).

On July 22, 2004, Sweeney hit a grand slam and later hit an insurance three-run home run in a 13–7 Kansas City win. The seven RBI would be a career-high for Sweeney. He would go on to bat .287 with 22 home runs and 79 RBI during the 2004 season.

Through the 2004 season, Sweeney compiled a .305 career average with 161 home runs and 683 RBI in 1,026 games.

==== 2005–2007 ====
In 2005, Sweeney was named the Royals' player of the year for the third time in his career. He led the team in average (.300) for the sixth time in his career, doubles (39) and home runs (21), despite playing in just 122 games. Sweeney won the Marvin Miller Man of the Year Award and was also named to the All-Star team for the fifth time in six seasons and the final time in his career.

Sweeney was restricted to designated hitter and was able to play just 60 games because of back problems in 2006. After returning from the disabled list on August 8, Sweeney hit .293 with six homers and 26 RBI, but missed another five games with a sore side.

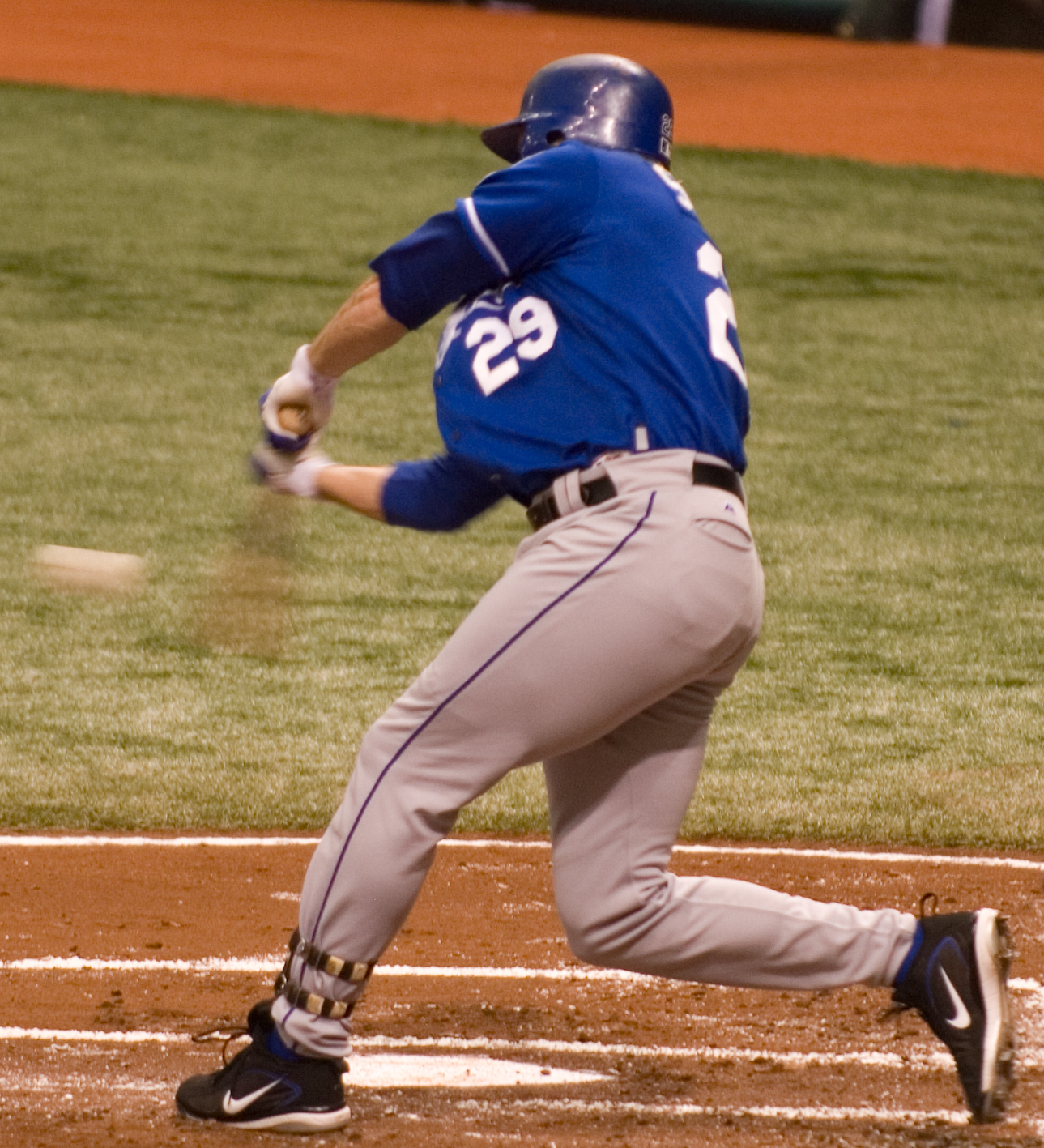
Sweeney with the Royals at Tropicana Field in 2007

On September 1, 2007, his first day back off the DL, Sweeney pinch-hit in the bottom of the ninth and hit a bloop base hit that broke up Minnesota Twins starting pitcher Scott Baker's no-hitter. Baker had gone eight perfect innings before he walked Royals catcher John Buck at the beginning of the ninth. With two outs to go, Royals manager Buddy Bell pinch-hit Sweeney for Tony Peña Jr. and Sweeney ended the no-hitter. Sweeney won the Hutch Award, which honors players who exemplify a fighting spirit, honoring Fred Hutchinson, who died of cancer in 1964.

===== Last days as a Royal =====
On September 29, 2007, the day before his final game, Sweeney took out a full page ad in the sports section of The Kansas City Star.

The following day, Sweeney took the field against the Cleveland Indians in front of 19,104 fans at Kauffman Stadium in Kansas City. Sweeney's first at bat was interrupted by a standing ovation. His second at bat was delayed as well due to applause. Sweeney was removed from first base in the 7th inning and was given a third standing ovation. Sweeney entered the dugout, and upon still hearing fans roaring, he exited the dugout towards the field and bowed, waved, and said "Thank you." After the game, Sweeney and his two children rounded the bases as part of a Sunday home game tradition at Kauffman Stadium called "Sunday Fan Fun Run." Then he spent time talking to reporters, and as always, signed autographs for fans before he left the parking lot. Since leaving the Kansas City Royals his #29 has been left out of circulation, leading some to believe the Royals might end up retiring his number one day. After leaving the Royals, Sweeney ended up wearing #5 for the rest of his career with the Oakland Athletics, Seattle Mariners, and Philadelphia Phillies.

=== Oakland Athletics ===
On February 10, 2008, Sweeney signed a minor league contract, with an invitation to spring training, with the Oakland Athletics.

After a strong spring in which he hit .308 with a home run, Sweeney's contract was purchased on March 25, 2008. Sweeney underwent arthroscopic surgery on his troublesome left knee on June 11, and was expected to miss four to six weeks. After a brief return from the disabled list, Sweeney was released by the A's on September 9.

After considering retirement, Sweeney said he would like to play one more year before retiring.

=== Seattle Mariners ===
On January 29, 2009, Sweeney signed a minor league deal with an invitation to spring training with the Seattle Mariners, citing his desire to play for Mariners' manager Don Wakamatsu who was Sweeney's bench coach in Oakland. Sweeney made the major-league club Opening Day roster as a bench player.

On April 22, Sweeney left the game during his first at-bat due to back spasms. On May 3, Sweeney hit his first home run as a Mariner and 200th of his career in the 4th inning at Safeco Field against the Oakland Athletics. On August 6, in a return to Kansas City, Sweeney hit his 100th home run in Kauffman Stadium in an 8–2 loss to the Royals. On November 5, Sweeney elected free agency.

On February 12, 2010, Sweeney re-signed with the Mariners to a minor league deal. On March 30 the Mariners placed reserve first baseman/corner outfielder Ryan Garko on waivers, clearing room on the 25-man roster for Sweeney. Sweeney was not expected to make the team at the start of spring training but hit over .500 in exhibition games to beat out Garko. Sweeney would hit .263 with six home runs and 18 RBI during his time with the Mariners in 2010.

In May, after teammate Ken Griffey Jr. was accused of napping during a pinch hitting opportunity, Sweeney said he challenged anyone who said Griffey was asleep "to stand up and fight me". However, Griffey did not deny the accusation.

=== Philadelphia Phillies ===
On August 4, Seattle traded Sweeney to the Philadelphia Phillies to replace injured first baseman Ryan Howard for a player to be named later and/or cash considerations.

Sweeney hit his only home run with Philadelphia on August 29 in a 5–0 win over the San Diego Padres, his final MLB home run. With the Phillies, he also made the first postseason appearance of his career, going 1-for-1 at the plate in the National League Division Series.

== Legacy ==
On March 25, 2011 Sweeney signed a one-day contract with the Kansas City Royals and retired. He threw out the ceremonial first pitch of the 2011 season for Royals on opening day.

Before the 2009 season, the Royals organization created the Mike Sweeney Award which recognizes a player best representing the organization on and off the field. Sweeney was presented with the Mr. Baseball Award—the top honor at the Royals Awards dinner in January 2009. The award is named for Ewing Kauffman, the first owner of the Royals.

Sweeney was inducted into the Royals Hall of Fame in 2015. Also in 2015, he was inducted into the Irish American Baseball Hall of Fame.

Sweeney appeared on the ballot for the Baseball Hall of Fame 2016 election and earned three votes, falling below the 5 percent threshold to remain on the ballot.

=== Career statistics ===
Years	Games	PA	AB	R	H	2B	3B	HR	RBI	SB	BB	SO	AVG	OBP	SLG	FLD%
16	1454	5848	5188	759	1540	325	5	215	909	53	522	613	.297	.366	.486	.989

== Post-playing career ==
In March 2012, Sweeney joined the MLB Network as a studio analyst. He left the network shortly after making several appearances on MLB Tonight.

In February 2014, the Kansas City Royals announced that they had hired Sweeney as a special assistant to baseball operations. Sweeney's response to receiving the new job: "The only thing I was unable to accomplish during my playing days was to bring October baseball back to Kansas City. With this new position, my goal is do as much as I can to help the Royals get back to being one of the prized organizations in baseball, as it was in the 1980s." Sweeney settled into the role quickly, attending the Royals' spring training in Surprise, Arizona as a guest instructor that same month. That year, the Royals made the postseason for the first time in 29 years. Sweeney's current role is special assistant to baseball operations/player and staff engagement".

== Personal life ==
On November 9, 2002, Sweeney married Shara Nettles, the daughter of former major leaguer Jim Nettles and niece of Graig Nettles. They have six children together.

Due to fires in San Diego and the surrounding areas in 2007, Sweeney's family was forced to evacuate their home in Rancho Santa Fe and stay with his parents, who live in Ontario, California. He said that the few possessions that they took for safekeeping were their marriage certificate, three wedding photographs, birth certificates, and two pictures of his children with Pope Benedict, taken while they were in Rome the previous year. It was later reported that their house was still standing, although damaged by smoke and water.

=== Community involvement ===
A fluent speaker of Spanish, Sweeney was very active in the Kansas City community while a member of the Royals. He was a nominee for the Roberto Clemente Award and supported the community through various programs, including the Kansas City FCA chapter, Children's Mercy Hospital, and the Boys and Girls Club of Kansas City.

Sweeney has also purchased a dirt field in a poorer section of downtown Kansas City. The baseball field, once used to sell drugs, is now called Sweeney Family Field.

He was named the 2003 and 2004 Good Guy in Sports by the Sporting News. He teamed up annually with former Kansas City Chiefs fullback Tony Richardson to host the Sweeney-Richardson Golf Classic, which benefits a faith-based outreach program and invites area charity and non-profit groups to attend Royals games as part of the "Sween Team".

Sweeney is known for his approachability towards fans, and claims to sign autographs for all fans who ask.

=== Religion and activism ===
Sweeney is a devout Catholic and has appeared on EWTN's Life on the Rock, a program targeted towards young Christians. On October 24, 2006, he was featured in a political advertisement opposing an embryonic stem cell research bill in Missouri. It was in response to a pro-embryonic research advertisement featuring actor Michael J. Fox. Sweeney appeared with Jim Caviezel, Patricia Heaton, Jeff Suppan, and Kurt Warner.

Sweeney is also the advisory chairman of the Catholic Athletes for Christ and spokesman for Life Teen, the largest Catholic youth ministry program in the United States.

On June 13, 2007, Sweeney and his wife hosted the Lunch for Life and raised $60,000 for the crisis pregnancy centers throughout Kansas City. They also honored a 19-year-old mother who planned have an abortion but instead chose to have her baby. The Sweeneys gave her a "Life Award," which included gift certificates to salons and massage parlors and a grocery store, a baby stroller, a baby crib and clothes for the baby. She also received a $5,000 check to purchase a new automobile.

In 2010, Sweeney spoke to the National Catholic Register about his Catholic faith.

Sweeney had "Lose My Soul" by TobyMac as his walkup music with the Phillies. Mac used to be with the group DC Talk.

In 2025, Sweeney met Pope Leo XIV in Vatican City and tried to "convert" the lifelong White Sox fan to Royals fandom. Sweeney presented Leo with a customized Royals jersey bearing the number 267, denoting that Leo is the 267th pope.

== See also ==
- List of Kansas City Royals team records

Preceded by Jason Giambi	American League Player of the Month; June 2001	Succeeded by Jim Thome
