= 2014 World Series =

110th edition of Major League Baseball's championship series

Team (Wins)	Managers	Season
San Francisco Giants (4)	Bruce Bochy	88–74, .543, GB: 6
Kansas City Royals (3)	Ned Yost	89–73, .549, GB: 1
- Dates: October 21–29
- Venue(s): Kauffman Stadium (Kansas City); AT&T Park (San Francisco)
- MVP: Madison Bumgarner (San Francisco)
- Umpires: Jeff Kellogg (crew chief), Ted Barrett, Jeff Nelson (Games 3–7), Hunter Wendelstedt, Eric Cooper, Jim Reynolds, Jerry Meals (Games 1 & 2)

Broadcast
- Television: Fox (United States); MLB International (International)
- TV announcers: Joe Buck, Harold Reynolds, Tom Verducci, Ken Rosenthal and Erin Andrews (Fox); Gary Thorne and Rick Sutcliffe (MLB International)
- Radio: ESPN; KNBR (SF); KCSP (KC)
- Radio announcers: Dan Shulman and Aaron Boone (ESPN); Jon Miller, Dave Flemming, Duane Kuiper and Mike Krukow (KNBR); Denny Matthews, Ryan Lefebvre and Steve Physioc (KCSP)
- ALCS: Kansas City Royals over Baltimore Orioles (4–0)
- NLCS: San Francisco Giants over St. Louis Cardinals (4–1)

The 2014 World Series was the championship series of Major League Baseball's (MLB) 2014 season. The 110th edition of the World Series, it was a best-of-seven playoff between the National League (NL) champion San Francisco Giants and the American League (AL) champion Kansas City Royals. The series was played from October 21 to 29. The Giants defeated the Royals four games to three to clinch their third World Series championship in a five-season span (2010–14), and their third overall since the club's move to San Francisco from New York. (Note: The Giants moved from New York City to San Francisco after the 1957 season.) It was the Giants' eighth World Series championship in franchise history, and the Giants became the first team in MLB history to win the World Series as a number five seed. The series was also the sixth straight World Series to be won by a team that had missed the playoffs the year before.

The Giants won Game 1 behind a strong pitching performance by Madison Bumgarner while the Royals won Games 2 and 3 as their pitchers limited San Francisco to two runs per game. The Giants won Games 4 and 5, thanks to 11 runs in Game 4 and Bumgarner's complete game shutout in Game 5. Kansas City tied the series in Game 6, shutting out San Francisco and scoring 10 runs, which forced a Game 7. The Giants won the final game, 3–2, thanks to timely hitting, including the game-winning RBI by Michael Morse to score Pablo Sandoval. Bumgarner pitched five shutout innings in relief on two days' rest to clinch the championship, claiming the series MVP award.

This was the first World Series to feature two teams with fewer than 90 wins since 1981, as that year's season was shortened due to a player's strike, and the first in a non-strike season. Additionally, this was the last World Series to feature two wild card teams until the 2023 World Series.

== Background ==
=== Kansas City Royals ===
The Royals made their third World Series appearance in franchise history, the others being in 1980, when they lost to the Philadelphia Phillies in six games, and 1985, when they defeated the St. Louis Cardinals in seven games. Furthermore, the Royals ended a stretch of 28 consecutive seasons in which they did not appear in the postseason, the second-longest such streak since the MLB postseason was expanded in 1995.

The 4th-seeded Royals entered the 2014 World Series after defeating the 5th-seeded Oakland Athletics 9–8 in the AL Wild Card game, sweeping the top-seeded Los Angeles Angels of Anaheim in three games in the ALDS, and sweeping the 2nd-seeded Baltimore Orioles in four games in the ALCS. They were the first team to enter a World Series with an 8–0 record in that year's postseason and only the second to enter the World Series undefeated in the postseason since the creation of the Wild Card in 1994. (Note: The Colorado Rockies entered the 2007 World Series after going 7–0 in that year's postseason.)

=== San Francisco Giants ===
The Giants made their third World Series appearance in five years, having defeated the Texas Rangers in the 2010 World Series and the Detroit Tigers in the 2012 World Series. This was also their 20th appearance overall, and their sixth appearance since moving to San Francisco from New York City in 1958. The No. 5 seed Giants defeated the No. 4 seed Pittsburgh Pirates 8–0 in the NL Wild Card game, the top-seeded Washington Nationals in four games in the NLDS 3 games to 1, and the 3rd-seeded St. Louis Cardinals in five games in the NLCS four games to one via a walk-off home run (in the process denying a rematch of the 1985 World Series). The World Series was the Giants' second trip to Kauffman Stadium in 2014, as the Royals had swept them in a three-game series on August 8–10. This was the fourth World Series in which the Giants faced a team from the Midwest (1917, 1954, 2012).

== Summary ==
San Francisco won the series, 4–3.

Game	Date	Score	Location	Time	Attendance
1	October 21	San Francisco Giants – 7, Kansas City Royals – 1	Kauffman Stadium	3:32	40,459
2	October 22	San Francisco Giants – 2, Kansas City Royals – 7	Kauffman Stadium	3:25	40,446
3	October 24	Kansas City Royals – 3, San Francisco Giants – 2	AT&T Park	3:15	43,020
4	October 25	Kansas City Royals – 4, San Francisco Giants – 11	AT&T Park	4:00	43,066
5	October 26	Kansas City Royals – 0, San Francisco Giants – 5	AT&T Park	3:09	43,087
6	October 28	San Francisco Giants – 0, Kansas City Royals – 10	Kauffman Stadium	3:21	40,372
7	October 29	San Francisco Giants – 3, Kansas City Royals – 2	Kauffman Stadium	3:10	40,535

== Matchups ==
=== Game 1 ===
October 21, 2014 7:07 pm (CDT) at Kauffman Stadium in Kansas City, Missouri, 66 °F (19 °C), clear
Team	1	2	3	4	5	6	7	8	9	R	H	E
San Francisco	3	0	0	2	0	0	2	0	0	7	11	1
Kansas City	0	0	0	0	0	0	1	0	0	1	4	0
WP: Madison Bumgarner (1–0) LP: James Shields (0–1); Home runs: SF: Hunter Pence (1); KC: Salvador Pérez (1); Attendance: 40,459; Boxscore

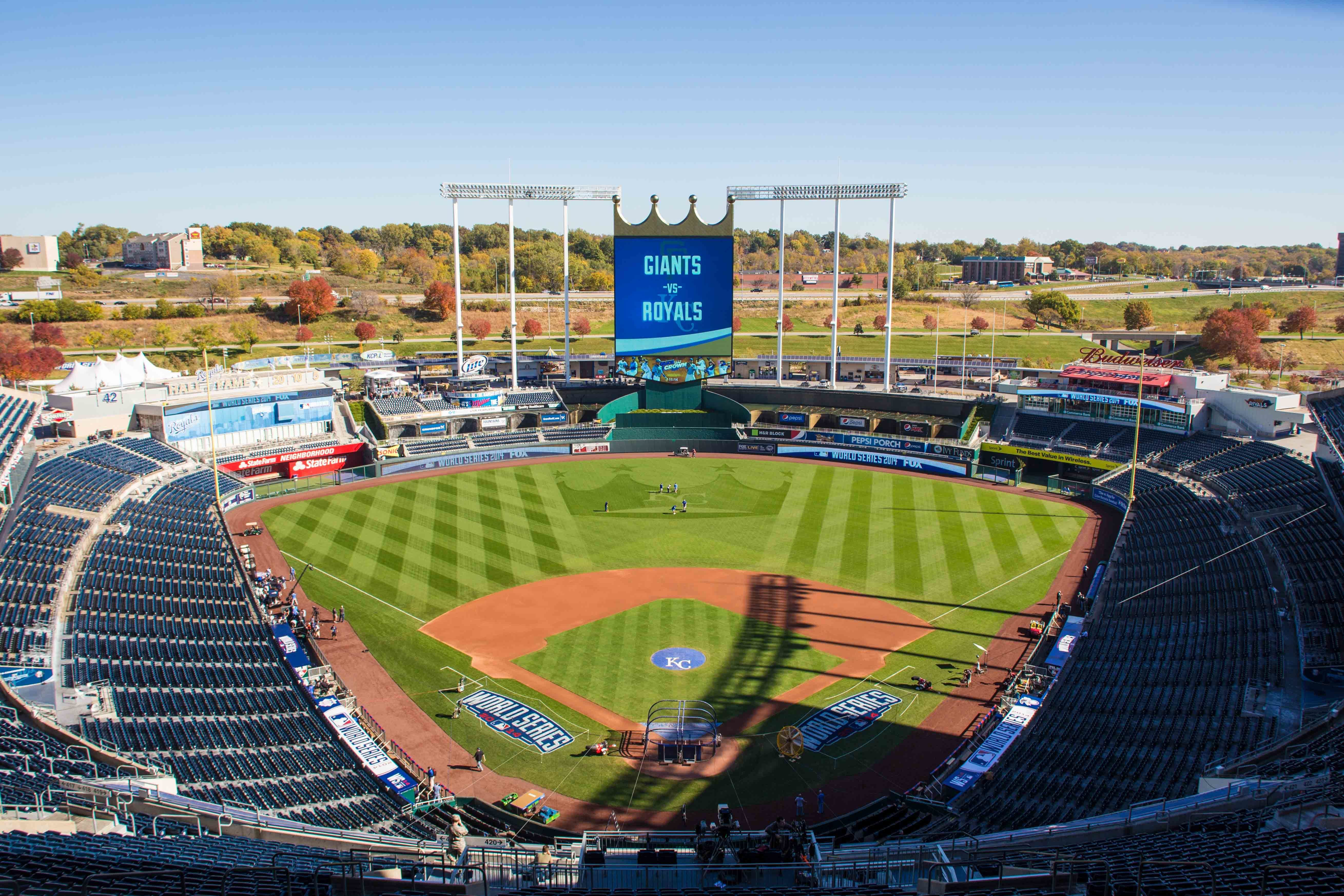
Kauffman Stadium in preparation for Game 1 of the World Series

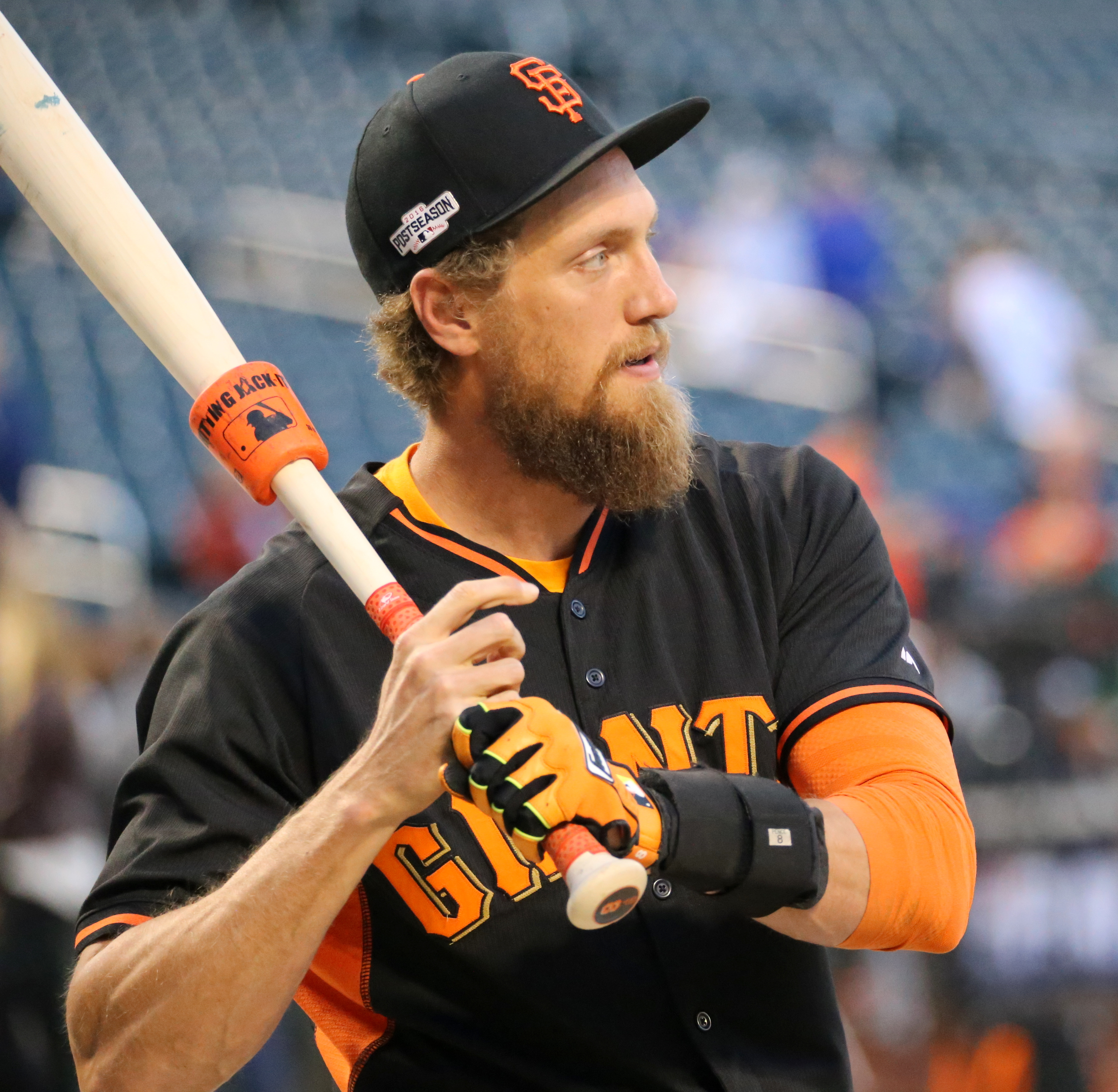
Hunter Pence hit a 2-run home run in the top of the 1st inning.

Both teams sent their respective aces to the mound for Game 1: James Shields for the Royals and Madison Bumgarner for the Giants. The Giants scored the first run in the opening inning when a Pablo Sandoval double scored Gregor Blanco from second base, although Buster Posey was thrown out at home. The next batter, Hunter Pence, hit a home run to center field to give the Giants a three-run lead. The Royals did not threaten until the third inning. Omar Infante reached on an error by Giants' shortstop Brandon Crawford, and Mike Moustakas hit a double down the line to move Infante to third. Bumgarner struck out both Alcides Escobar and Norichika Aoki, but walked Lorenzo Cain to load the bases. Eric Hosmer grounded out to second base on the first pitch to end the threat.

The Giants threatened again in the top of the fourth when Pence doubled, advanced to third on a wild pitch, and Brandon Belt walked. Michael Morse then singled to score the fourth run of the game, which knocked Shields out of the game. Danny Duffy was brought in. After allowing a sacrifice bunt to Juan Pérez, Duffy walked Crawford and Blanco consecutively, bringing the fifth run in for the Giants. He retired the next two batters to end the inning. The score remained 5–0 until the top of the seventh, when Blanco drew another walk. Joe Panik hit a ball to right fielder Aoki, which he misplayed, allowing Blanco to score and Panik to reach third. Tim Collins was brought in and allowed a single to Sandoval after Posey lined out, driving in the seventh and final run for San Francisco.

The Royals scored their only run on a Salvador Pérez home run off Bumgarner in the bottom of the seventh inning, which proved to be the only run given up by Bumgarner in the series. That homer also ended Bumgarner's consecutive scoreless innings streak in the World Series at 21, second only to Giants Hall of Famer Christy Mathewson, who went 28. Collins and Jason Frasor each pitched scoreless innings for the Royals, while Javier López and Hunter Strickland closed out the game for the Giants with scoreless eighth and ninth innings. The loss was Kansas City's first of the 2014 postseason, following eight consecutive wins in the Wild Card Game, ALDS and ALCS. This also snapped the Royals' franchise postseason winning streak at 11 games dating back to the 1985 World Series.

=== Game 2 ===
October 22, 2014 7:08 pm (CDT) at Kauffman Stadium in Kansas City, Missouri, 67 °F (19 °C), partly cloudy
Team	1	2	3	4	5	6	7	8	9	R	H	E
San Francisco	1	0	0	1	0	0	0	0	0	2	9	0
Kansas City	1	1	0	0	0	5	0	0	X	7	10	0
WP: Kelvin Herrera (1–0) LP: Jake Peavy (0–1); Home runs: SF: Gregor Blanco (1); KC: Omar Infante (1); Attendance: 40,446; Boxscore

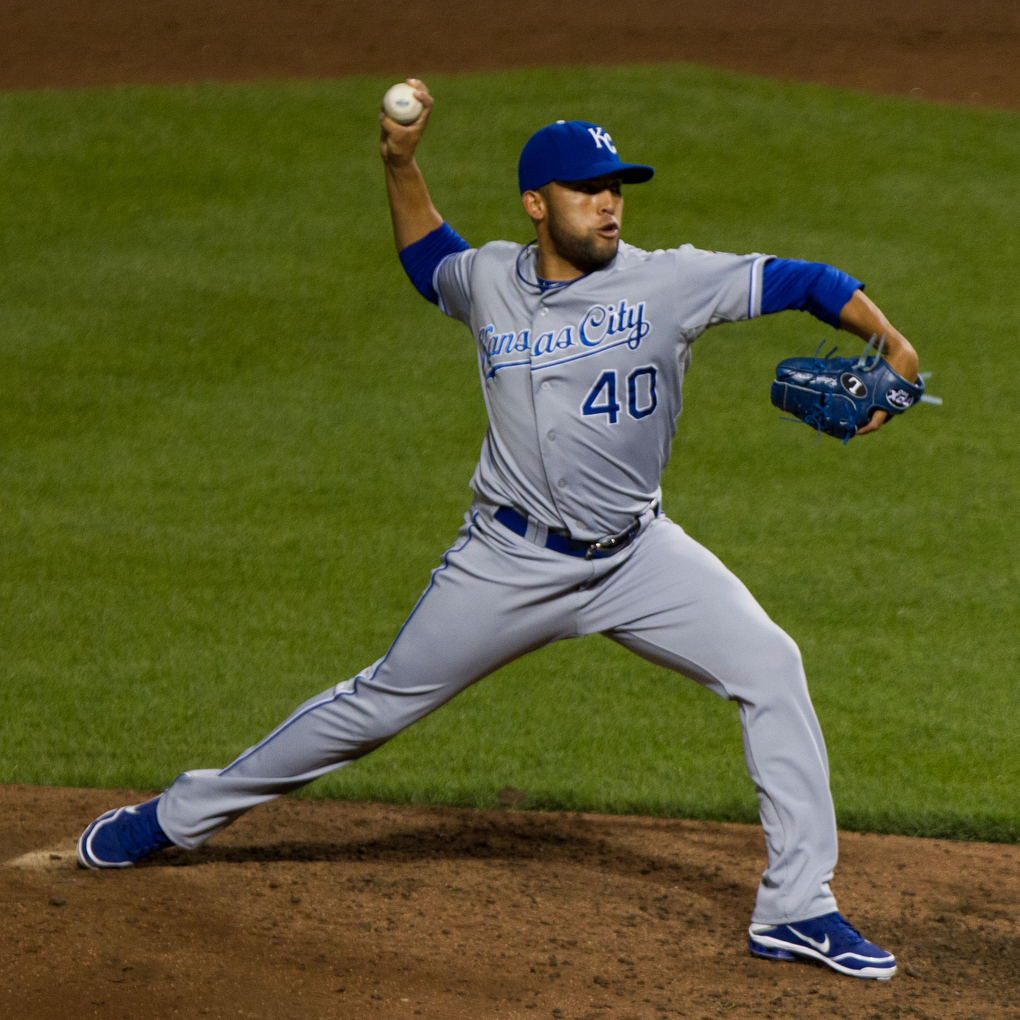
Kelvin Herrera was the winning pitcher for the Kansas City Royals in Game 2.

Kansas City sent rookie Yordano Ventura to the mound in an attempt to even the series. San Francisco countered with Jake Peavy. The Giants scored first on a lead-off home run by Gregor Blanco. This would turn out to be the last home run the Giants would hit in the series. Alcides Escobar singled to lead off the Royals' half of the first but was thrown out trying to steal second base. The Royals, however, tied up the game on a Lorenzo Cain double, Eric Hosmer walk and a Billy Butler single, all with two outs.

The Royals gained the lead in the bottom of the second inning on doubles by Omar Infante and Escobar, but the Giants tied the game on doubles by Pablo Sandoval and Brandon Belt. Belt was tagged out attempting to advance to third but was out returning to second when Michael Morse flied out to right fielder Norichika Aoki, who threw to Ventura, who threw to Infante, thus ending the inning. In the top of the sixth inning, both Buster Posey and Hunter Pence singled, knocking Ventura out of the game. Kelvin Herrera was brought in and got the last two outs to end the inning.

Kansas City regained the lead in the bottom of the sixth inning as Cain singled to center and Hosmer walked, prompting Bruce Bochy to take out Peavy and put in Jean Machi. Butler singled to left, which drove in Cain and gave the Royals the lead. He was replaced by pinch runner Terrance Gore. Javier López was brought in to face Alex Gordon, whom he retired. Hunter Strickland was then brought in. A wild pitch advanced the runners to second and third. Salvador Pérez hit a double to left center to drive in both runners. Infante then hit a two-run home run to left field, bringing the score to 7–2 Royals. Tensions began to rise as Strickland and Pérez got into a shouting match as Pérez was crossing home plate. Both dugouts cleared but the umpiring crew managed to calm the situation down. Jeremy Affeldt came in and allowed a single to Mike Moustakas but then induced a double play from Escobar to end the inning.

Herrera returned for the seventh inning. He struck out Travis Ishikawa but allowed consecutive walks to Brandon Crawford and Blanco. He then retired the last two batters to end the Giants's seventh. Tim Lincecum pitched 1 2/3 innings for the Giants, but left the game due to an injury and Santiago Casilla faced Lincecum's last batter in the eighth. Wade Davis pitched a perfect eighth, and Greg Holland struck out the side in the ninth to end the game and secure the victory for the Royals.

=== Game 3 ===
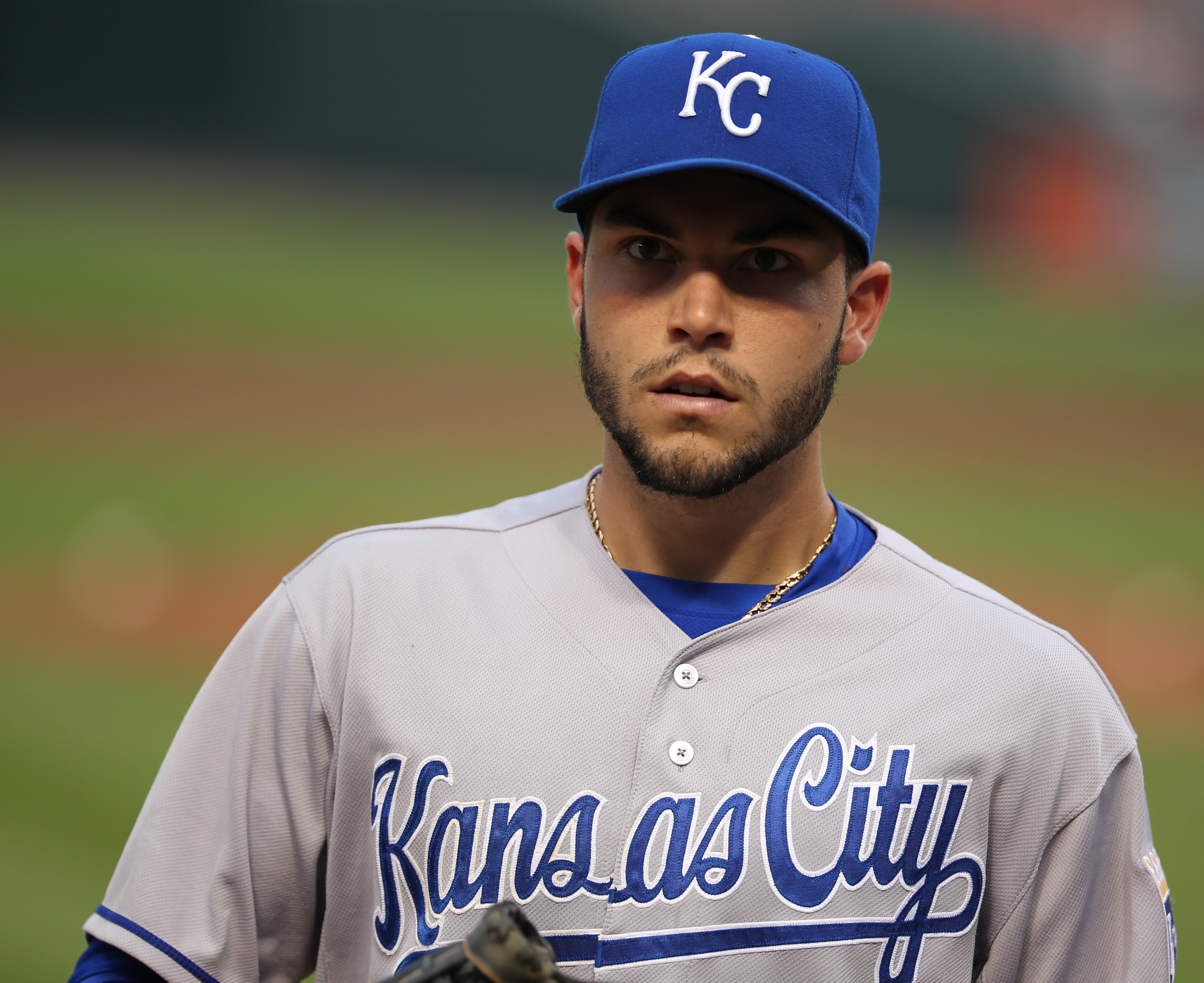
Eric Hosmer hit the game-winning RBI for Kansas City.

October 24, 2014 5:10 pm (PDT) at AT&T Park in San Francisco, California, 67 °F (19 °C), partly cloudy
Team	1	2	3	4	5	6	7	8	9	R	H	E
Kansas City	1	0	0	0	0	2	0	0	0	3	6	0
San Francisco	0	0	0	0	0	2	0	0	0	2	4	0
WP: Jeremy Guthrie (1–0) LP: Tim Hudson (0–1) Sv: Greg Holland (1); Attendance: 43,020; Boxscore

The series shifted to San Francisco for Game 3. Tim Hudson started his first career World Series game, as did Royals' starter Jeremy Guthrie. The Royals scored first when Alcides Escobar doubled to lead off the game and came around to score on groundouts by Alex Gordon and Lorenzo Cain. Kansas City mounted a rally when Mike Moustakas singled and Omar Infante walked, but Hudson ended the threat by inducing a lineout and a double play. Both pitchers settled down until the sixth inning.

The Royals started another threat in the top of the sixth inning. Escobar singled with one out. Gordon then doubled to center field to score Escobar and increase the Royals' lead. Cain grounded to third for the second out, and Bruce Bochy brought in southpaw Javier Lopez to face the left-hand hitting Eric Hosmer. Hosmer battled an eleven pitch at-bat with Lopez until finally singling to center to score Gordon for what would end up being the game-winning RBI. Lopez retired Moustakas to end the inning.

The Giants responded with two runs in the bottom of the inning. Brandon Crawford singled and Michael Morse doubled, scoring Crawford, and causing the Royals to replace Guthrie with Kelvin Herrera. Herrera walked Gregor Blanco to put runners on first and second. After Joe Panik grounded out to advance the runners to second and third, Buster Posey then hit an RBI groundout scoring Morse and cutting the Giants' deficit to one. Pablo Sandoval then grounded out to Hosmer to end the inning.

Sergio Romo pitched a scoreless seventh for the Giants. Herrera walked Hunter Pence to lead off the bottom of the seventh inning, but struck out Brandon Belt. Brandon Finnegan was then brought in for the Royals, which also made him the first rookie pitcher to pitch in the College World Series and the World Series in the same year. He retired the last two batters to end the seventh.

Romo struck out the first batter of the eighth inning. Jeremy Affeldt came in for the Giants and retired Gordon and Cain. Wade Davis retired the side in order in the bottom of the eighth. Affeldt retired the first two batters of the ninth. Santiago Casilla came in and retired the last batter. Greg Holland was brought in to save the game for the Royals. He retired the middle of the Giants lineup in order and saved the game for the Royals, giving them a 2–1 series lead.

This was only the second World Series loss at home for the Giants since AT&T Park opened in 2000, and the first since Game 3 of the 2002 Series. Holland saved his record-tying seventh game of the playoffs, tying John Wetteland, Robb Nen, Troy Percival, Brad Lidge, and Koji Uehara for most ever in a single postseason.

=== Game 4 ===
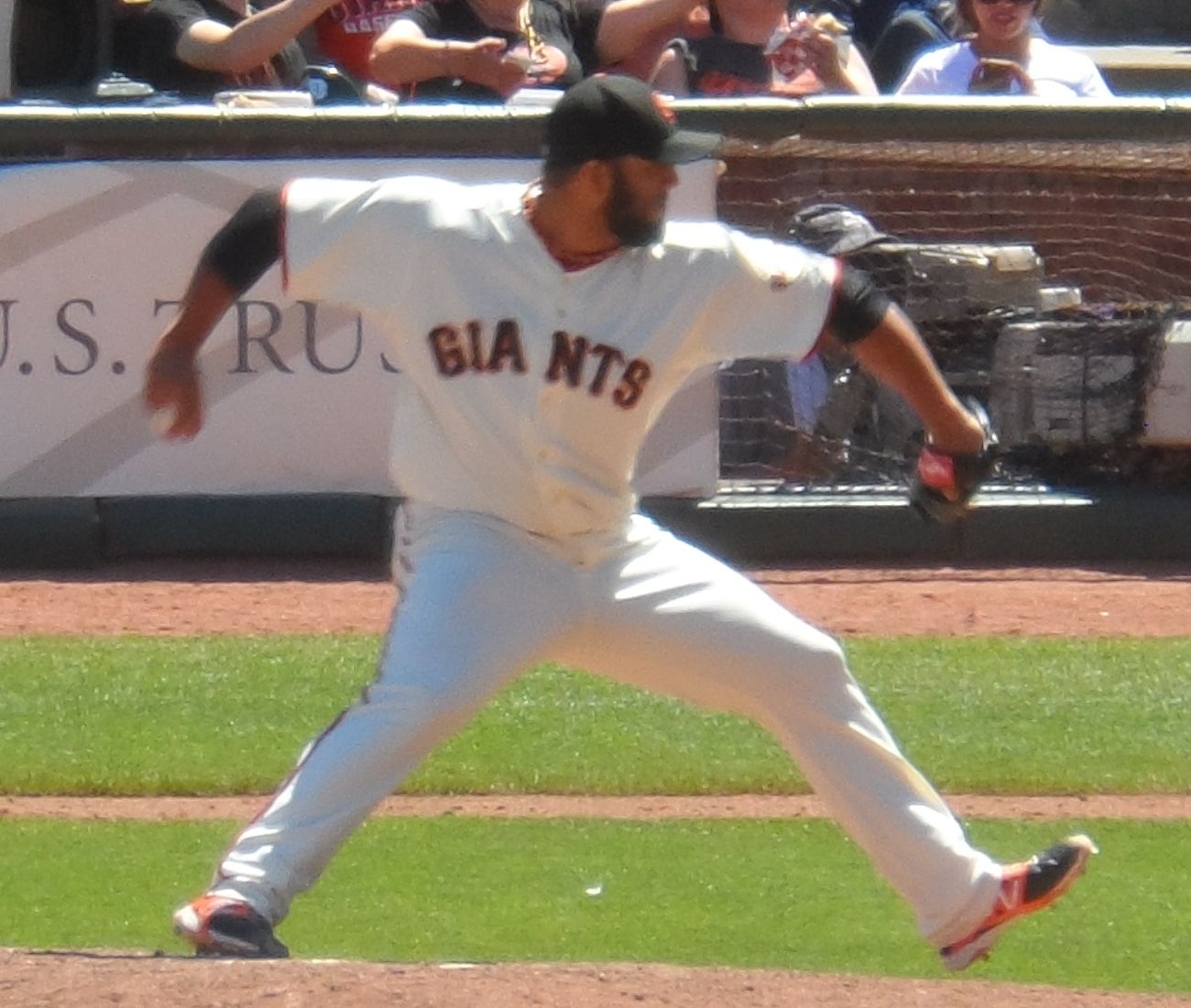
Yusmeiro Petit pitched three scoreless innings for the Giants in Game 4.

October 25, 2014 5:08 pm (PDT) at AT&T Park in San Francisco, California, 65 °F (18 °C), cloudy
Team	1	2	3	4	5	6	7	8	9	R	H	E
Kansas City	0	0	4	0	0	0	0	0	0	4	12	1
San Francisco	1	0	1	0	2	3	4	0	X	11	16	0
WP: Yusmeiro Petit (1–0) LP: Brandon Finnegan (0–1); Attendance: 43,066; Boxscore

The Giants sent Ryan Vogelsong to the mound, while the Royals sent Jason Vargas. The Giants scored in the bottom of the first inning when Gregor Blanco walked, advanced to second on a wild pitch, stole third base, and scored on a fielder's choice off the bat of Hunter Pence.

The Royals countered in the top of the third inning where they batted around. Alcides Escobar singled with one out, but was eliminated as a runner when Alex Gordon grounded into a forceout for the second out of the inning. Gordon then stole second base and consecutive infield singles by Lorenzo Cain and Eric Hosmer brought Gordon home to tie the game. Mike Moustakas then walked to load up the bases. Omar Infante singled to center to score Cain and Hosmer to give the Royals a 3–1 lead. Salvador Pérez followed with another single to score Moustakas and knock Vogelsong out of the game. Jean Machi came in and walked Jarrod Dyson, but struck out the pitcher with the bases loaded to end the threat.

The Giants scored a run in the bottom of the inning when pinch hitter Matt Duffy singled, advanced to second on a groundout, and scored on a single to left field by Buster Posey. Yusmeiro Petit pitched three scoreless innings starting with the fourth to keep the Royals off the board.

After the Royals failed to do anything with a lead-off double from Hosmer in the top of the 5th, the Giants tied the game in the bottom of the inning. Joe Panik started the inning with a double to right center, which knocked Vargas out of the game. Jason Frasor was brought in. A groundout moved Panik to third, and he scored on a single to center by Pence. Danny Duffy replaced Frasor in the game. Pablo Sandoval singled and Brandon Belt walked to load the bases. Juan Pérez hit a sinking liner to center, but it was caught by a diving Jarrod Dyson. Pence tagged up at third and scored the tying run. Duffy struck out Brandon Crawford to end the inning.

San Francisco gained the lead in the bottom of the sixth. Brandon Finnegan replaced Duffy. Pinch hitter Joaquín Árias and Blanco both singled to lead off the inning. Panik bunted to move the runners over to second and third. Finnegan intentionally walked Posey to load the bases and set up a force play at any base. Hunter Pence hit the ball to shortstop Escobar, who threw home for the forceout. However, Sandoval singled to center to score Blanco and Posey, giving the Giants a two-run lead. Belt hit another single to center which scored Pence to score the third run of the inning. Pérez grounded out to end the inning.

Jeremy Affeldt pitched a scoreless seventh for the Giants. Finnegan started the Giants' seventh by allowing an infield single to Crawford and a walk to pinch-hitter Michael Morse. Tim Collins was then brought in. He fielded a bunt ground ball by Blanco, but threw the ball away, allowing Crawford to score. Panik then hit a double to center field to score both Morse and Blanco. After Posey grounded out, Pence doubled to left field, scoring Panik, and giving the Giants' their eleventh and final run of the game.

Sergio Romo pitched a scoreless eighth for the Giants, as did Collins for the Royals. Hunter Strickland allowed a double to Gordon in the ninth inning, but he did not score, as Hosmer grounded out to end the game.

=== Game 5 ===
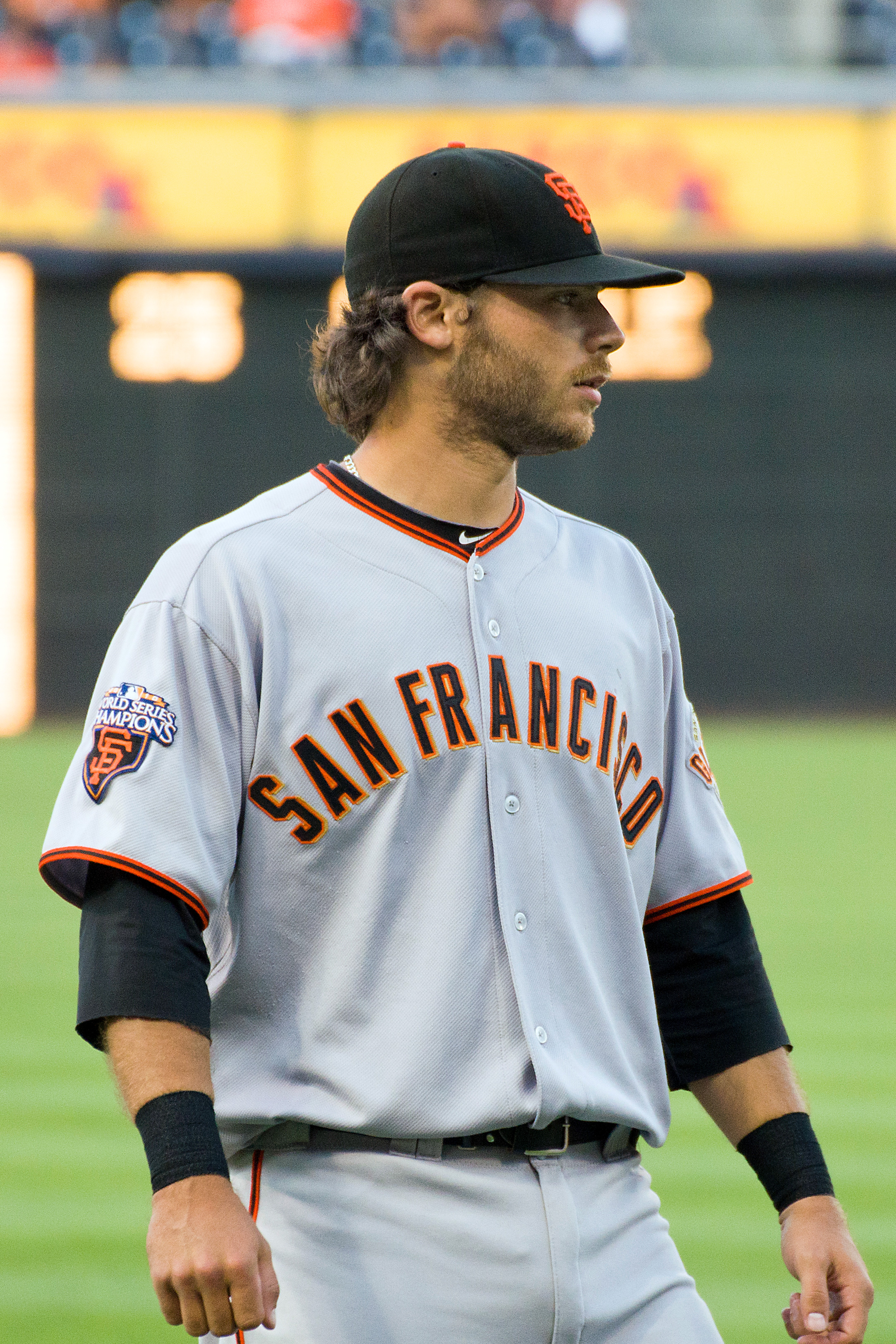
Brandon Crawford had three runs batted in for the Giants in Game 5.

October 26, 2014 5:09 pm (PDT) at AT&T Park in San Francisco, California, 67 °F (19 °C), clear
Team	1	2	3	4	5	6	7	8	9	R	H	E
Kansas City	0	0	0	0	0	0	0	0	0	0	4	1
San Francisco	0	1	0	1	0	0	0	3	X	5	12	0
WP: Madison Bumgarner (2–0) LP: James Shields (0–2); Attendance: 43,087; Boxscore

Madison Bumgarner became the first pitcher to record a complete game shutout in a World Series game since Josh Beckett did so for the Florida Marlins in Game 6 of the 2003 World Series, and the first Giants pitcher to accomplish the feat since Jack Sanford in Game 2 of the 1962 World Series. Bumgarner only allowed four hits, recorded eight strikeouts and no walks. When Bumgarner did allow a hit, he shut down the Royals after that by coming up with six of his eight strikeouts immediately after allowing a hit. The only time that the Giants' pitcher allowed the Royals to get into scoring position was Omar Infante's one-out double in the fifth inning, but Bumgarner then struck out the next two Kansas City batters.

This was the third straight game in which neither team hit a home run, the first such occurrence in a World Series since 1948. The Giants opened the scoring in the second, starting with Hunter Pence's single and Brandon Belt's bunt base hit. After Travis Ishikawa flied out to center to advance both runners, Brandon Crawford grounded out to second, with Pence scoring. Crawford then recorded an RBI single to right in the fourth, allowing Pablo Sandoval to score from second base to give San Francisco a 2–0 lead. Kansas City starter James Shields was relieved by Kelvin Herrera after pitching six innings. Herrera kept the score at 2–0 in the seventh. But in the eighth, Sandoval and Pence led off with back-to-back singles, and Herrera was then relieved by Wade Davis. Juan Pérez hit a one-out double, scoring Sandoval and Pence, with Pérez reaching third base on a throwing error by Royals shortstop Alcides Escobar. Pérez had learned of his friend Oscar Taveras having died in the middle of the game and broke down in tears. He dedicated the double to Oscar, posting a tweet. Crawford then recorded his third RBI of the game with a single to left to score Pérez to make it 5–0.

=== Game 6 ===
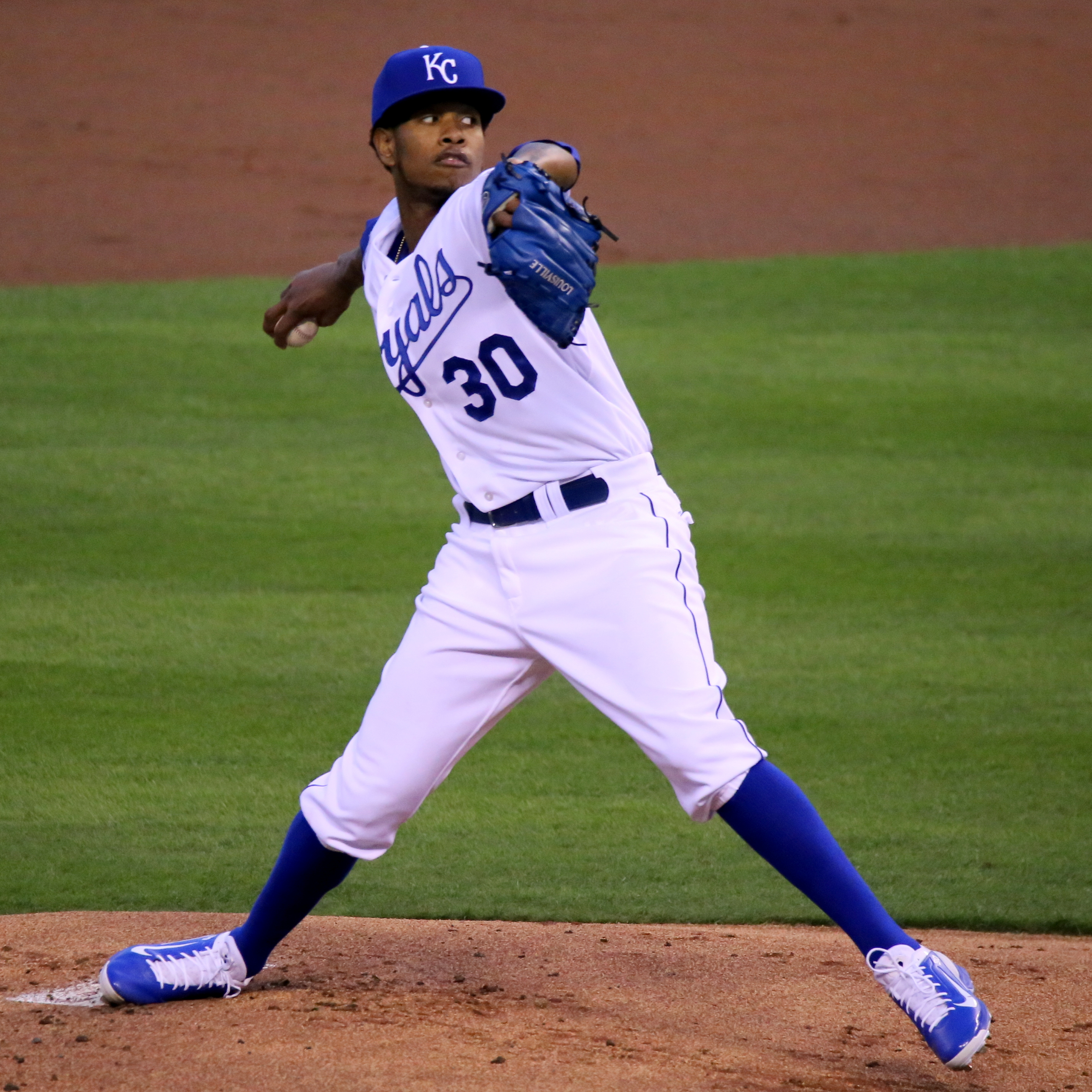
Yordano Ventura pitched seven shutout innings for the Royals in Game 6.

October 28, 2014 7:08 pm (CDT) at Kauffman Stadium in Kansas City, Missouri, 58 °F (14 °C), clear
Team	1	2	3	4	5	6	7	8	9	R	H	E
San Francisco	0	0	0	0	0	0	0	0	0	0	6	0
Kansas City	0	7	1	0	1	0	1	0	X	10	15	0
WP: Yordano Ventura (1–0) LP: Jake Peavy (0–2); Home runs: SF: None; KC: Mike Moustakas (1); Attendance: 40,372; Boxscore

The Royals scored seven runs in the second inning en route to a 10–0 win and forcing a Game 7. In memory of his recently deceased friend Oscar Taveras, Kansas City starter Yordano Ventura pitched seven innings, allowing only three Giants hits.

Royals hitters knocked out starter Jake Peavy after 1 1/3 innings. After Alex Gordon and Salvador Pérez led off the second with back-to-back singles, Mike Moustakas hit an RBI double to score Gordon. After Omar Infante struck out for the first out with runners on second and third, Alcides Escobar reached base safely on an infield hit, where first baseman Brandon Belt hesitated to make sure Pérez didn't try to head home, which allowed Escobar to slide safely to first. Now with the bases loaded, Nori Aoki recorded an RBI single to score Pérez, which ended Peavy's night. Yusmeiro Petit replaced Peavy on the mound, and allowed a single by Lorenzo Cain, and doubles by Eric Hosmer and Billy Butler that scored five more Kansas City runs made the score 7–0. Cain then hit an RBI ground rule double in the third, Escobar an RBI double in the fifth, and Moustakas a home run in the seventh, his fifth homer of the postseason, which broke Willie Aikens' franchise record of 4 home runs in a single postseason.

=== Game 7 ===
External videos
- Game 7 Full replay on the MLB's official YouTube channel

October 29, 2014 7:11 pm (CDT) at Kauffman Stadium in Kansas City, Missouri, 55 °F (13 °C), clear
Team	1	2	3	4	5	6	7	8	9	R	H	E
San Francisco	0	2	0	1	0	0	0	0	0	3	8	1
Kansas City	0	2	0	0	0	0	0	0	0	2	6	0
WP: Jeremy Affeldt (1–0) LP: Jeremy Guthrie (1–1) Sv: Madison Bumgarner (1); Attendance: 40,535; Boxscore

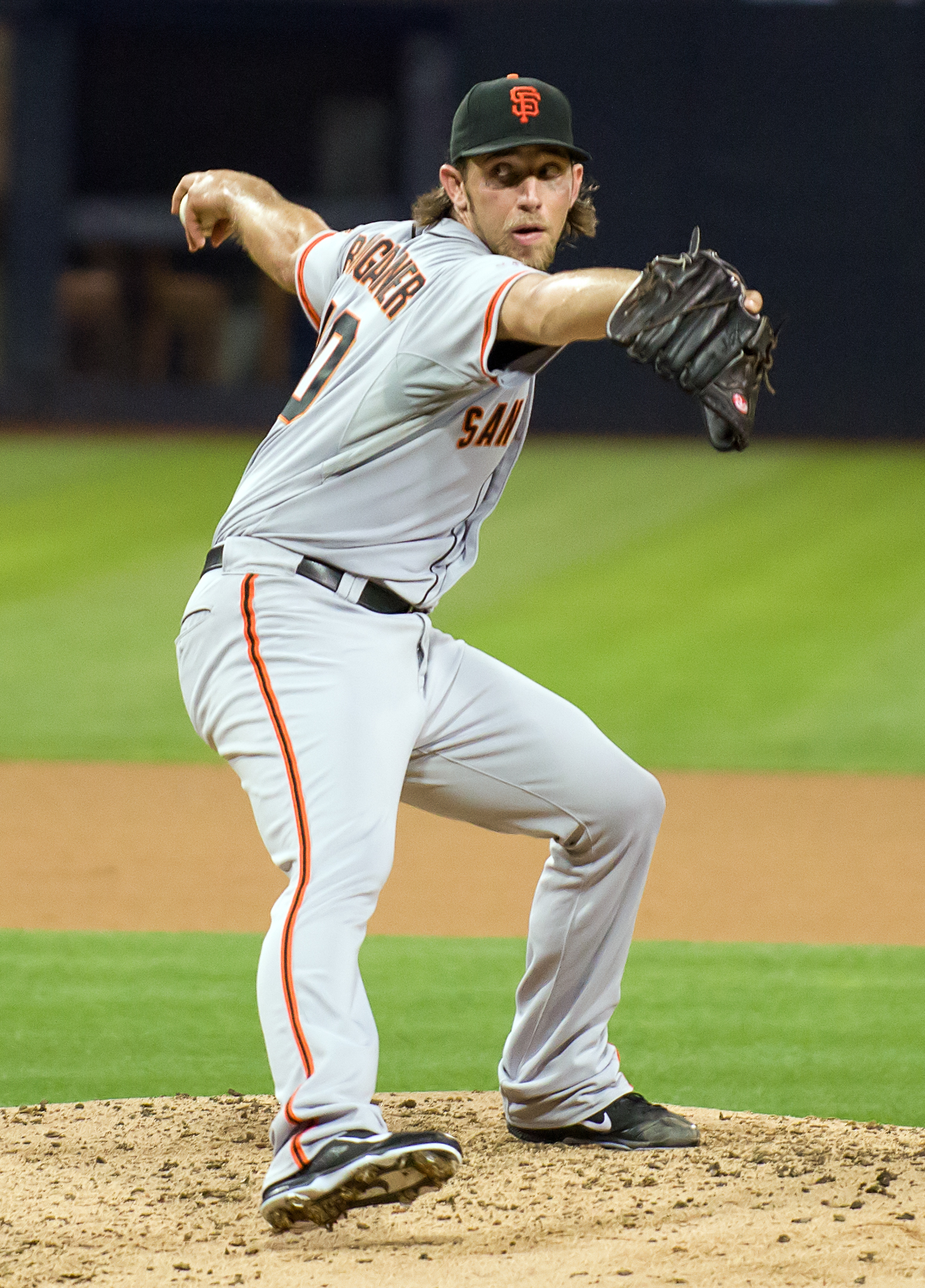
Madison Bumgarner pitched five scoreless innings in relief in game 7 and won World Series MVP

Although Giants starter Tim Hudson failed to make it past the bottom of the second inning after giving up two runs, reliever Jeremy Affeldt and series MVP Madison Bumgarner shut out the Kansas City offense the rest of the game, as the Giants held on for a tense 3–2 victory.

After a scoreless first inning, the Giants struck first in the top of the second inning. Pablo Sandoval reached on a hit by pitch and Hunter Pence and Brandon Belt each singled to load the bases with nobody out. Michael Morse hit a sacrifice fly to right that scored Sandoval and moved Pence to third. Brandon Crawford followed with another sacrifice fly to center that scored Pence, giving the Giants a 2–0 lead.

The Royals struck back in the bottom of the second. Billy Butler produced a single followed by an Alex Gordon double, managing to score Butler from first. Salvador Pérez was hit by a pitch from Hudson on the knee, which put Pérez on first. Mike Moustakas advanced Gordon to third and then the Royals tied the game on a sacrifice fly by Omar Infante. After Alcides Escobar singled to put two men on with two outs, manager Bruce Bochy brought in Affeldt, who retired Nori Aoki to end the threat.

Affeldt pitched a scoreless third inning, with defensive help by Giants rookie second baseman Joe Panik on a key double play. With a runner on first and no outs, Panik made a diving stop on a ball hit up the middle by Eric Hosmer and then flipped the ball from his glove while still on the ground to Crawford at second base, who quickly threw over to Belt at first. Hosmer made a diving slide into first instead of running through the bag. Although first base umpire Eric Cooper initially ruled that Hosmer was safe, Giants manager Bochy challenged the umpire's call. After a nearly three-minute video review, the call was overturned. That play became the first successful challenge by a manager in a World Series.

In the top of the fourth inning, Sandoval reached on an infield single and moved to third after Pence singled and Belt flied out to left. Manager Ned Yost brought in Kelvin Herrera to face Morse, but Morse fought off an 0–2 pitch and looped a broken-bat single to right field to score Sandoval, giving the Giants a 3–2 lead. After Affeldt pitched a scoreless bottom of the fourth, the Giants brought in Bumgarner on two days' rest to protect their one-run lead in the fifth. Bumgarner promptly gave up a single to Infante who then made it to second base on a sacrifice bunt by Escobar. Aoki then hit what appeared to be a game-tying double toward the left field corner. But left fielder Juan Pérez, who was playing closer to the left field line than usual, made a running catch only a few feet from foul territory. Bumgarner then struck out Lorenzo Cain to end the inning.

After allowing the single to Infante in the fifth inning, Bumgarner retired 14 batters in a row. The game ended in dramatic fashion when, with two outs, Gordon of the Royals lined an 87 mph (140 km/h) slider to left center field. Center fielder Gregor Blanco misplayed the ball, and it rolled to the wall. Left fielder Pérez had trouble grabbing the ball, which allowed Gordon to reach third base as the potential tying run, on a base hit and error combination. (After the game, there was much discussion among fans and statisticians about the decision by third base coach, Mike Jirschele, not to wave Gordon home in an attempt to tie the game.) With the tying run 90 feet (27 m) away and the winning run at the plate, Bumgarner threw six pitches to Pérez, inducing a foul pop fly caught by Sandoval to end the game, series, and baseball season. Bumgarner was initially credited with the win, which would have given him a 3–0 record in the series, the first since Randy Johnson in the 2001 World Series. However, following deliberation among the official scorers, it was decided that Affeldt by rule was entitled to the win.

This win made the Giants the first visiting team since the 1979 Pittsburgh Pirates to win Game 7 of the World Series, continuing their trend of clinching World Series titles while on the road, having done so at Globe Life Park in Arlington in 2010 and Comerica Park in 2012. To date, the Giants have not clinched a World Series at AT&T (now Oracle) Park, but they hosted Game 7 at Candlestick Park in 1962, which the New York Yankees won, and the Oakland Athletics completed a four-game sweep by winning Games 3 and 4 at Candlestick in 1989. With the win, the Giants' postseason record against American League Central teams improved to 4–2, and they have officially beaten every AL Central team in the World Series except the Chicago White Sox, who they lost to in the 1917 World Series.

=== Composite line score ===
2014 World Series (4–3): San Francisco Giants (NL) beat Kansas City Royals (AL)

Team	1	2	3	4	5	6	7	8	9	R	H	E
San Francisco Giants	5	3	1	5	2	5	6	3	0	30	66	2
Kansas City Royals	2	10	5	0	1	7	2	0	0	27	57	2
Home runs: SF: Hunter Pence (1), Gregor Blanco (1); KC: Salvador Pérez (1), Omar Infante (1), Mike Moustakas (1); Total attendance: 290,985 Average attendance: 41,569; Winning player's share: $388,605.94 Losing player's share: $230,699.73

In all but one of the seven games, the team that scored first went on to win; the exception was in Game 2. As of the 2019 World Series, the team that scores first in the final game of a World Series has won 64% of the time, as the Giants did in 2014.

== Broadcasting ==
=== Television ===
Fox broadcast the series in the United States (simulcast in Canada on Sportsnet), with play-by-play announcer Joe Buck calling the action along with color analysts Harold Reynolds and Tom Verducci and field reporters Ken Rosenthal and Erin Andrews. This was the first World Series telecast for Reynolds and Verducci, who replaced longtime Fox analyst Tim McCarver after the latter's retirement from the network following the 2013 World Series. Kevin Burkhardt hosted the pre-game and post-game shows with analysts Gabe Kapler, Frank Thomas, and Nick Swisher; David Ortiz joined them for Games 1 and 2.

Fox Deportes offered a Spanish-language telecast of the series, with Pablo Alsina, Duaner Sánchez, and José Tolentino commentating. MLB International televised the series outside the U.S. and Canada, with Gary Thorne and Rick Sutcliffe announcing.

The World Series started on a Tuesday for the first time since 1990, instead of a Wednesday as in previous years. (Note: The series started on a Tuesday to avoid a game on Thursday, generally a big day of television viewing, where Fox's telecast would face stiff competition from Thursday Night Football, ESPN College Football Thursday Primetime, and various popular primetime entertainment shows. The change also meant that the series only had to compete with the National Football League on one night (Sunday) instead of three (Thursday, Sunday and Monday).)

==== Ratings ====
The 2014 World Series averaged a national Nielsen rating of 8.3/14, making it the second-worst rated World Series in Major League Baseball history (after the 2012 series). Through six games, the series was averaging 7.4, which would have made it the worst-rated World Series, but Game 7 produced a respectable 13.7 to bolster the series average enough to avoid the notorious distinction. (Note: The 2012 World Series currently holds the record for lowest rating at 7.6, though this Series was only four games.)

The 2014 World Series set records for lowest-rated Games 1, 4, 5, 6, and 7 in World Series history. The previous Game 7 in World Series history occurred in 2011, when the St. Louis Cardinals and Texas Rangers produced a 14.7 rating, a full 1.0 over 2014's Game 7.

This was the fifth consecutive World Series (and the sixth in seven years) to earn a national rating under 10.0. (Note: Since 2007, the 2009 World Series between the New York Yankees and the Philadelphia Phillies is the only series to produce a rating over 10.0 (it drew a 11.7). Prior to 2008, the World Series had never averaged below 10.0.)

Game	Ratings (households)	Share (households)	American audience (in millions)
1	7.3	12	12.2
2	7.9	14	12.9
3	7.2	13	12.1
4	6.3	12	10.7
5	7.3	12	12.6
6	8.1	13	13.4
7	13.7	23	23.52

=== Radio ===
ESPN Radio aired the series, with Dan Shulman on play-by-play and Aaron Boone handling color commentary. Marc Kestecher anchored pre- and post-game coverage for the network along with Jon Sciambi, Chris Singleton and Peter Pascarelli. ESPN Deportes Radio offered a Spanish-language broadcast, with Eduardo Ortega announcing along with Renato Bermúdez, Armando Talavera and José Francisco Rivera.

Locally, the series was broadcast on the teams' flagship radio stations with their respective announcing crews. In San Francisco, KNBR aired the games in English (with Jon Miller, Duane Kuiper, Mike Krukow and Dave Flemming announcing), while KTRB broadcast in Spanish (with Erwin Higueros and Tito Fuentes announcing). In Kansas City, KCSP broadcast the games (with Denny Matthews and Ryan Lefebvre announcing). Due to contractual obligations, the affiliate stations on the teams' radio networks had to carry the ESPN Radio feed of the games, although the local broadcasts were also available on Sirius and XM satellite radio and to Gameday Audio subscribers at MLB.com. In Kansas City, WHB carried the ESPN Radio feed in direct competition with KCSP's broadcast.

== Historical notes ==
This was the second World Series in history in which two wild card teams faced each other, the first being the 2002 World Series between the Giants and the Anaheim Angels. (Note: The 2002 World Series between the Giants and the Anaheim Angels was also between two wild card teams.) It was the first World Series to involve a team (let alone two) that played in the additional wild card game instituted in 2012. Consequently, by winning, the Giants set the record for most victories in a single postseason with 12. This was also only the second World Series since 2002 to go to seven games. (Note: The 2011 World Series also lasted seven games.) Additionally, this was the first World Series in which both teams played in a play-in game (Note: A play-in game includes the wild card game since 2012, and the tie breaker from 1994–2011.) since the Division Series was added in 1994. It was also the first time in World Series history (after the advent of the 162-game schedule) that the opponents both had fewer than 90 wins in the regular season. (Note: "Fewer than 90 wins" excludes seasons when the schedule was cut short.) It was the first Series in history in which at least five games were decided by five or more runs. It was the third World Series to end in Game 7 with the tying run on third base, after 1946 and 1962.

The Giants became the first road team to win Game 7 of the World Series since the 1979 Pirates, ending a string of nine straight home team victories in the deciding game. The Giants were also the first team to come back to win Game 7 after losing Game 6 since the 1997 Marlins as well as the first road team to do since the 1975 Reds. It was the Giants' first ever Game 7 victory in a best-of-seven World Series. (Note: The Giants won Game 7 in 1921, but it was a best-of-nine series and they went on to defeat the New York Yankees five games to three) The victory wrapped up the Giants' third championship in five seasons, a feat accomplished only once previously by a National League team since the St. Louis Cardinals in 1942, 1944, and 1946. The Giants became the fifth franchise to win at least three titles in five years (or fewer), joining the Athletics, Cardinals, Red Sox, and Yankees. Manager Bruce Bochy became the tenth manager in MLB history to win three championships, with the previous nine all inducted into the Hall of Fame. (Note: The previous nine are Joe McCarthy (7), Casey Stengel (7), Connie Mack (5), Walter Alston (4), Joe Torre (4), Sparky Anderson (3), Miller Huggins (3), Tony La Russa (3), and John McGraw (3).)

Earlier in the postseason, both teams extended their record streaks of victories in postseason elimination games to seven in their respective wild card games. (Note: The Royals won three elimination games in the 1985 ALCS, three more in the 1985 World Series, followed by a victory in the 2014 AL Wild Card Game. The Giants won three elimination games in the 2012 NLDS, three more in the 2012 NLCS, followed by a victory in the 2014 NL Wild Card Game.) The Royals extended their streak to eight games with their victory in Game 6. With their victory in Game 7, the Giants also extended their streak to eight games and consequently ended the Royals streak. The Giants extended their streak of postseason series wins to ten, extending the National League record, a streak surpassed only by the New York Yankees from 1998 to 2001 (11 consecutive series wins).

Madison Bumgarner pitched 21 innings in the 2014 World Series and allowed just one run, giving him a series ERA of just 0.43, the lowest since Sandy Koufax's 0.38 ERA in the 1965 World Series. In the World Series, Bumgarner pitched more than one-third of the 61 innings thrown by the Giants. Bumgarner set a new World Series record for lowest career ERA with 0.25 (minimum 25 innings pitched), besting Jack Billingham's 0.36 career ERA. Bumgarner's 52 2/3 innings pitched in the postseason set a new record, surpassing Curt Schilling's 48 1/3 innings pitched in 2001.

Additionally, Bumgarner is the last pitcher to throw a complete game shutout in a World Series, to date. The following year, Johnny Cueto would throw a complete game for the Royals in the World Series, but allowed a run in the process.

The final at-bat of the series represented a rare "golden pitch" situation — the 12th in baseball history, and the first since 2001 — by which either team could theoretically win the World Series on the next pitch. After Alex Gordon's two-out triple in the bottom of the 9th, Salvador Perez represented both the championship-winning run and the championship-losing out. Perez faced six golden pitches before fouling out to end the series.

== Aftermath ==
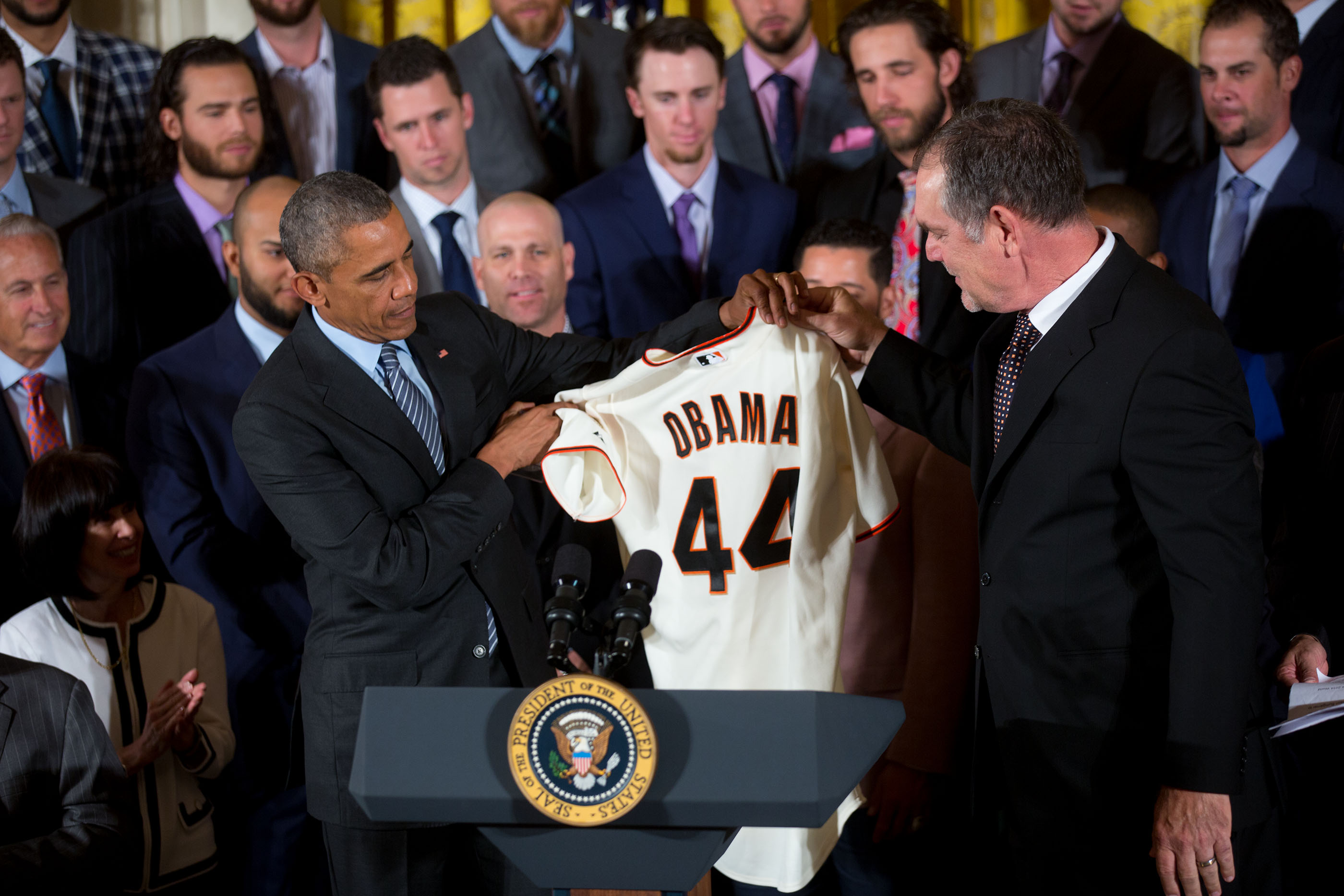
President Barack Obama with the 2014 World Series champion San Francisco Giants at the White House

Despite rainy weather, hundreds of thousands of fans turned out for the Giants' victory parade in San Francisco on October 31, 2014.

The Giants missed the playoffs in the 2015 season with an 84–78 record. They returned to the postseason in 2016 in hopes of adding a fourth championship in seven seasons, but they would lose in the NLDS to the eventual World Series champion Chicago Cubs, officially ending their dynasty. They returned to the postseason in 2021 after winning a franchise record 107 games, but were defeated in the NLDS by their archrival in the Los Angeles Dodgers. Outside of their surprise 2021 season, the Giants entered a period of dormancy from 2017–2025.

The Royals carried over their momentum from the previous fall, winning the American League Central the very next season. This was Kansas City's first division title since 1985, when they won the American League West. Their 95–67 record was the best in the American League, and the Royals' best since 1980. Kansas City would go on to return to the World Series, where they defeated the New York Mets four games to one, making them the first team since the 1989 Oakland Athletics to win the World Series after losing one the previous year.

Years later, the two cities developed an inter conference rivalry in the National Football League. The Kansas City Chiefs beat the San Francisco 49ers in Super Bowl LIV, 31–20, in 2020. Four years later, the Chiefs would again best the 49ers in an OT-thriller in Super Bowl LVIII.

With the Giants being the first visiting team to win Game 7 since 1979 (the home team having a 9–0 record in the interim), this began a streak of visiting teams winning Game 7 of the World Series, next with the Chicago Cubs in 2016, the Houston Astros in 2017, the Washington Nationals in 2019, and the Los Angeles Dodgers in 2025 all winning on the road.

This was the last World Series to feature two wild card teams until the 2023 World Series.

This would be the final World Series where Bud Selig was the commissioner of baseball. Selig would step down in January 2015 and was replaced by current commissioner Rob Manfred.

== See also ==
- 2014 Japan Series
- 2014 Korean Series
- Golden pitch
