= 2015 World Series =

111th edition of Major League Baseball's championship series

Team (Wins)	Managers	Season
Kansas City Royals (4)	Ned Yost	95–67, .586, GA: 12
New York Mets (1)	Terry Collins	90–72, .556, GA: 7
- Dates: October 27 – November 1
- Venue(s): Kauffman Stadium (Kansas City); Citi Field (New York)
- MVP: Salvador Pérez (Kansas City)
- Umpires: Gary Cederstrom (crew chief), Bill Welke (games 1–2), Mike Everitt (games 3–5), Mark Carlson, Mike Winters, Jim Wolf, Alfonso Márquez, Ron Kulpa (replay assistant)

Broadcast
- Television: Fox (United States); MLB International (International)
- TV announcers: Joe Buck, Harold Reynolds, Tom Verducci, Ken Rosenthal and Erin Andrews (Fox); Matt Vasgersian and John Smoltz (MLB International)
- Radio: ESPN; KCSP (KC); WOR (NYM)
- Radio announcers: Dan Shulman and Aaron Boone (ESPN); Denny Matthews, Ryan Lefebvre, and Steve Physioc (KCSP); Howie Rose and Josh Lewin (WOR)
- ALCS: Kansas City Royals over Toronto Blue Jays (4–2)
- NLCS: New York Mets over Chicago Cubs (4–0)

The 2015 World Series was the championship series of Major League Baseball's (MLB) 2015 season. The 111th edition of the World Series, it was a best-of-seven playoff between the National League (NL) champion New York Mets and the American League (AL) champion Kansas City Royals. The series was played between October 27 and November 1, with the Royals winning the series 4 games to 1, clinching the team's second World Series and first since the 1985 series. It was the first time since 2010 that the Series extended into November.

The Royals had home field advantage for the series because of the AL's 6–3 victory in the Major League Baseball All-Star Game. It was the 13th World Series in which home field advantage was awarded to the league that won the All-Star Game, a practice that was discontinued after the 2016 season. The series was played in a 2-3-2 format: the Royals hosted Games 1 and 2, and would have hosted Games 6 and 7 had they been needed. The Mets hosted Games 3, 4, and 5.

The Royals became the first team since the Oakland Athletics in the 1989 World Series to win the World Series after losing in the previous year; and in addition, they became the first expansion team to win the World Series since the Florida Marlins won it all in 2003. It was also the first World Series played between two expansion teams. Salvador Pérez was named the World Series Most Valuable Player.

The 2015 World Series is considered to be above average in most rankings, and is the only Fall Classic to feature a lead change in every game.

== Background ==
This was the first World Series in which both teams were expansion teams, which are teams that were formed after the 1960 season; the Mets began play in 1962 and the Royals in 1969. Additionally, they have been the most successful expansion teams in the major leagues: the Mets and Royals were the first expansion teams in their respective leagues to win not only a league championship pennant (1969 for the Mets and 1980 for the Royals) but the World Series as well (the Mets in 1969 and the Royals in 1985). With five and four pennants respectively, the Mets and Royals have the most league championships among the expansion franchises. Each team was also seeking to end a championship drought; the Royals' previous championship was in 1985, with the Mets' last title coming one year later in 1986.

=== New York Mets ===
The Mets made their fifth appearance in the World Series after sweeping the Cubs 4–0 in the 2015 National League Championship Series (NLCS). They had split their four previous appearances, winning the 1969 World Series against the Baltimore Orioles and the 1986 World Series against the Boston Red Sox, while losing the 1973 World Series against the Oakland Athletics and the 2000 World Series against the New York Yankees, their cross-town rivals.

The Mets qualified for the postseason by winning the National League (NL) East, their sixth division title. The third-seeded Mets faced the #2 seed Los Angeles Dodgers in the 2015 NL Division Series, winning in five games. In the 2015 NLCS, Daniel Murphy led the team by hitting home runs in each game of the four-game sweep of the fifth-seeded Chicago Cubs. By winning the NLCS, the Mets became the first expansion franchise to play in the World Series five times. (Note: In 2022, the Houston Astros became the second expansion team to accomplish the feat) In addition, the Mets have made World Series appearances in all but one of their six decades of existence, not appearing in any that were played during the 1990s. This was the first World Series appearance for Mets' manager Terry Collins, who had never reached the postseason as a manager prior to 2015.

=== Kansas City Royals ===
The Royals made their second consecutive appearance in the World Series, both under Ned Yost, and fourth overall. They won the 1985 World Series against the St. Louis Cardinals, and lost their two other appearances, the 1980 World Series against the Philadelphia Phillies and the 2014 World Series against the San Francisco Giants. The Royals qualified for the postseason by winning the American League (AL) Central, their seventh division title and their first since winning the AL West in 1985. The top-seeded Royals faced the #5 seed Houston Astros in the 2015 American League Division Series, winning in five games. They followed that up in the 2015 American League Championship Series, beating the second-seeded Toronto Blue Jays in six games.

By winning the ALCS, the Royals became the first team to play in consecutive World Series since the Texas Rangers played in the 2010 World Series and 2011 World Series.

=== Series preview ===
The series began on October 27. The American League won the 2015 All-Star Game, therefore the Royals had home field advantage for the series.

The Mets and the Royals hadn't played each other since 2013. Though the Mets boasted four starting pitchers who could throw over 95 miles per hour (153 km/h)—Matt Harvey, Noah Syndergaard, Jacob deGrom, and Steven Matz—the Royals had the best team batting average against pitches over that speed during the 2015 season. And while the Mets' starting pitchers had the best strikeout-to-walk ratio in MLB, the Royals' roster of strong contact hitters led baseball in contact rate. The Royals also had a superior defensive team, finishing second in the majors in Defensive Runs Saved, while the Mets finished 21st. The Royals bullpen, anchored by Wade Davis and Kelvin Herrera, also provided a strength. While the Mets hitters performed better against left-handed pitchers than right-handed pitchers, the Royals four starting pitchers, Johnny Cueto, Edinson Vólquez, Yordano Ventura, and Chris Young, and primary relievers, Davis, Herrera, Ryan Madson, and Luke Hochevar, were right-handed.

== Summary ==
Kansas City won the series, 4–1.

Game	Date	Score	Location	Time	Attendance
1	October 27	New York Mets – 4, Kansas City Royals – 5 (14)	Kauffman Stadium	5:09	40,320
2	October 28	New York Mets – 1, Kansas City Royals – 7	Kauffman Stadium	2:54	40,410
3	October 30	Kansas City Royals – 3, New York Mets – 9	Citi Field	3:22	44,781
4	October 31	Kansas City Royals – 5, New York Mets – 3	Citi Field	3:29	44,815
5	November 1	Kansas City Royals – 7, New York Mets – 2 (12)	Citi Field	4:15	44,859

== Matchups ==
=== Game 1 ===
October 27, 2015 7:09 pm (CDT) at Kauffman Stadium in Kansas City, Missouri, 54 °F (12 °C), Cloudy
Team	1	2	3	4	5	6	7	8	9	10	11	12	13	14	R	H	E
New York	0	0	0	1	1	1	0	1	0	0	0	0	0	0	4	11	1
Kansas City	1	0	0	0	0	2	0	0	1	0	0	0	0	1	5	11	1
WP: Chris Young (1–0) LP: Bartolo Colón (0–1); Home runs: NYM: Curtis Granderson (1); KC: Alcides Escobar (1), Alex Gordon (1); Attendance: 40,320; Boxscore

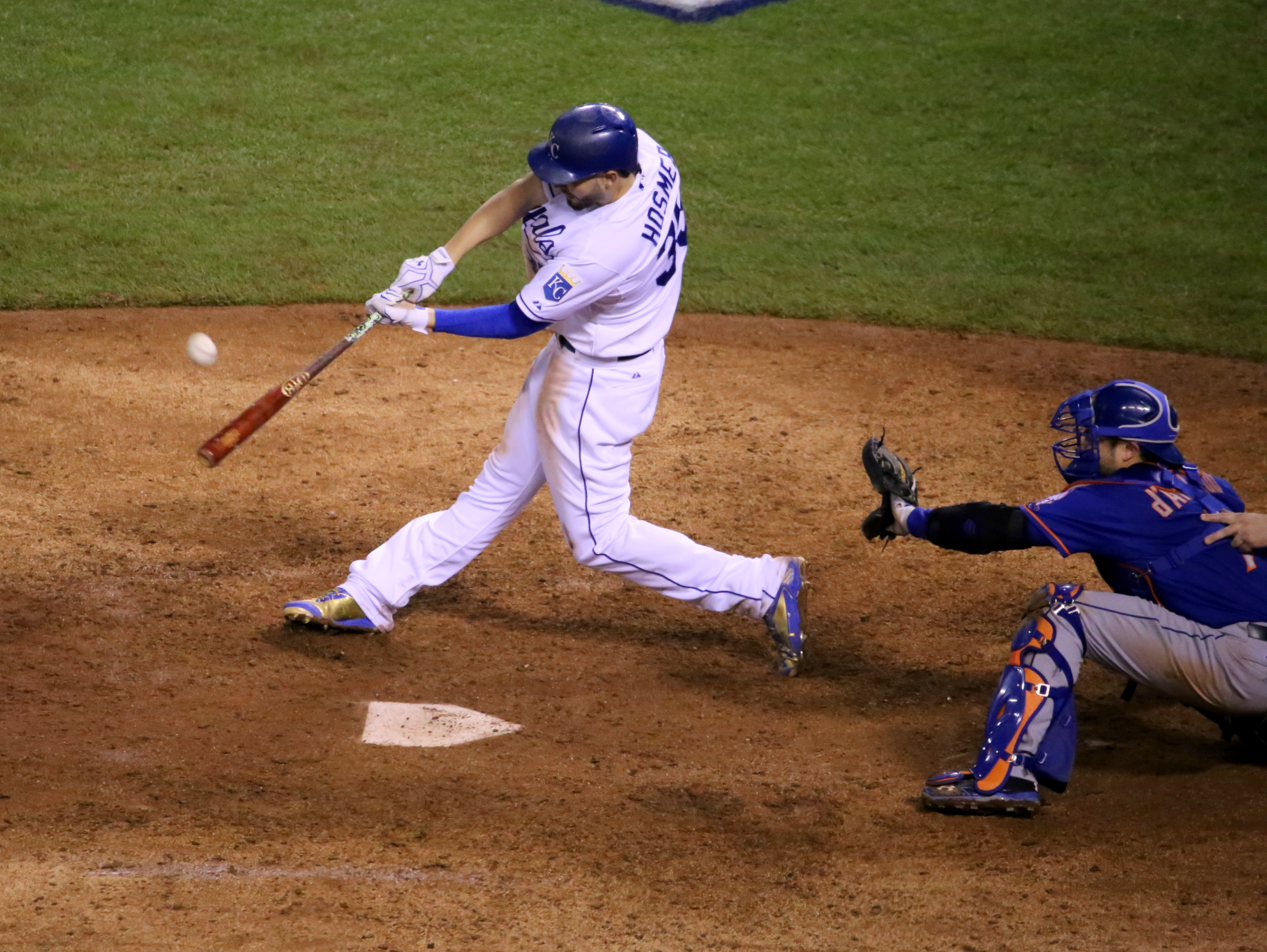
Eric Hosmer walks off Game 1 with a sac fly.

The ceremonial first pitch was thrown out by George Brett while Andy Grammer sang the national anthem. Matt Harvey started Game 1 for the Mets, while Edinson Vólquez started for the Royals. Vólquez's father had died earlier in the day. He was not aware of his father's death until after he left the game.

On the first pitch thrown by Harvey, Alcides Escobar hit an inside-the-park home run, the first in a World Series game since Mule Haas in Game 4 of the 1929 World Series, and the first hit by a leadoff batter since Patsy Dougherty did it in Game 2 of the 1903 World Series. In the fourth inning, Murphy recorded the Mets' first hit, and later scored their first run on a hit by Travis d'Arnaud. Curtis Granderson hit a home run in the fifth inning to give the Mets a 2–1 lead. The Mets took a 3–1 lead in the top of the sixth when Michael Conforto drove in Yoenis Céspedes with a sacrifice fly. Mike Moustakas then saved a run with a diving stop and throw out to first to end the top of the sixth. Eric Hosmer reduced the lead to 3–2 with a sacrifice fly, and set a new Royals' postseason run batted in (RBI) record in the process. A single by Moustakas tied the game at three, but in the top of the eighth, Wilmer Flores reached on an fielding error by Hosmer, allowing Juan Lagares to score the go-ahead run and give the Mets a 4–3 lead. In the bottom of the ninth with the Mets two outs away from taking Game 1, Alex Gordon tied the game for the Royals with a home run to deep center field, as Jeurys Familia blew his first save in six postseason opportunities and his first since July 30. With the home run, Gordon became the first player since Scott Brosius in the 2001 World Series, and just the fifth player in history, to tie a World Series game on a home run in the ninth inning.

In the bottom of the 11th inning, Granderson robbed the speedy Jarrod Dyson of a multi-base hit with a running, leaping catch that prevented what probably would have been a lead-off triple. The Mets went on to get out of the inning. In the bottom of the 14th, Escobar reached first on a throwing error by David Wright, and Bartolo Colón gave up a base hit to Ben Zobrist, allowing Escobar to reach third. Hosmer hit a sacrifice fly to Granderson in right field to drive in the winning run. This was the first time in World Series history that the same player scored both the first run of the game on the first pitch, and the last run of the game on the final pitch. The game ended at 12:18 a.m. CDT, lasting five hours and nine minutes. The game tied the record for the longest game by innings in World Series history, shared with Game 2 in the 1916 World Series and Game 3 in the 2005 World Series. However, the record has since been surpassed by Games 3 of the 2018 and 2025 World Series, each of which was 18 innings long. The loss made Colón the oldest player ever to lose a World Series game. With the loss, the Mets fell to 0–5 in Game 1 of the World Series, having lost the first game in all 5 of their appearances, including the two years they won the series (1969 and 1986).

=== Game 2 ===
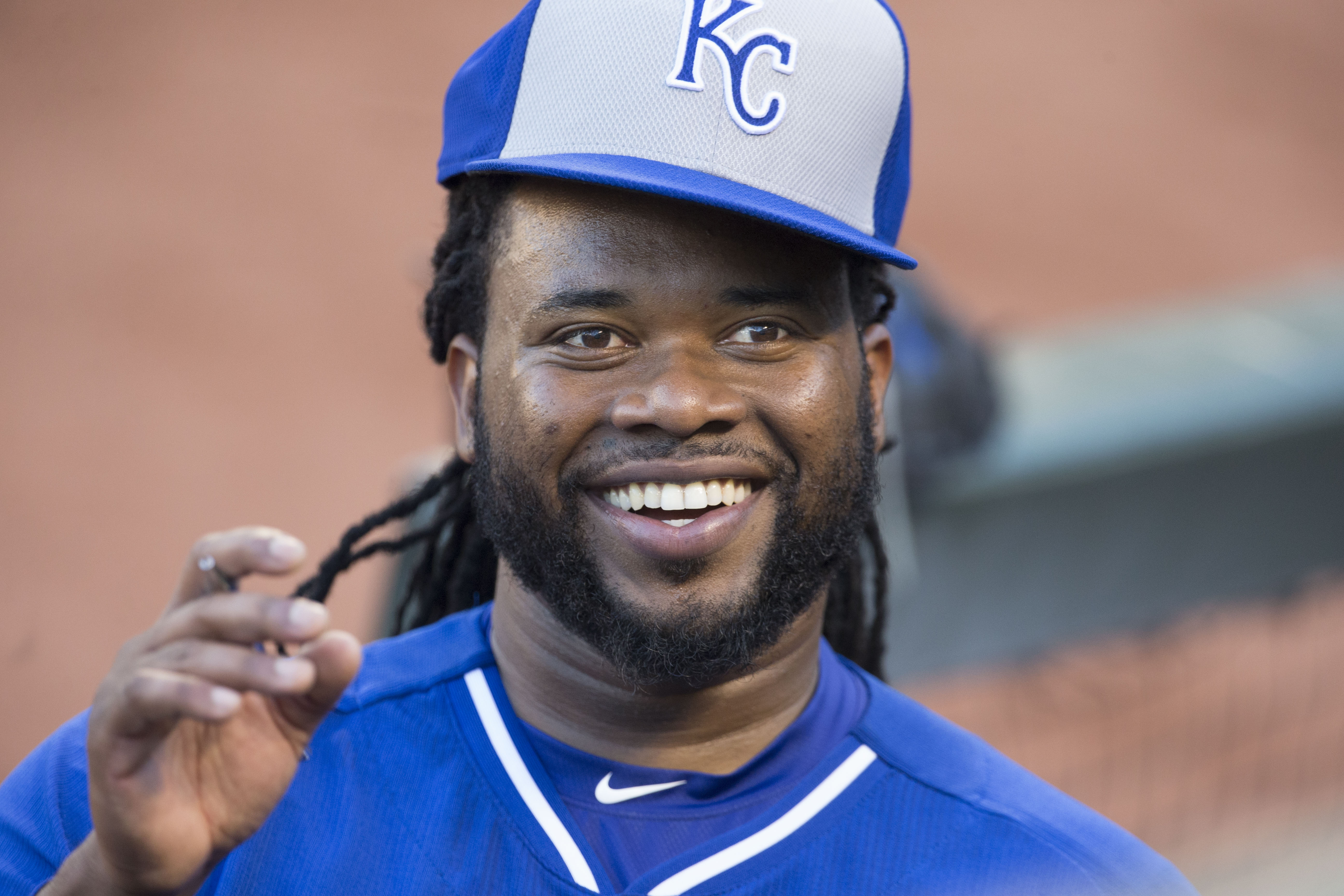
Johnny Cueto was the winning pitcher in Game 2, pitching a complete game.

October 28, 2015 7:08 pm (CDT) at Kauffman Stadium in Kansas City, Missouri, 53 °F (12 °C), Cloudy
Team	1	2	3	4	5	6	7	8	9	R	H	E
New York	0	0	0	1	0	0	0	0	0	1	2	1
Kansas City	0	0	0	0	4	0	0	3	X	7	10	0
WP: Johnny Cueto (1–0) LP: Jacob deGrom (0–1); Attendance: 40,410; Boxscore

In Game 2, Jacob deGrom started for the Mets, and Johnny Cueto started for the Royals. The ceremonial first pitch was thrown out by Medal of Honor recipients Don Ballard, Charles Hagemeister, and Roger Donlon while country singer and Missouri native Sara Evans sang the national anthem. Cueto walked Curtis Granderson to lead off the fourth and Daniel Murphy one out later. Yoenis Céspedes's hit into a forceout at second before Lucas Duda's RBI single put the Mets up 1–0. Duda produced the Mets' only other hit in the game in the second and Cueto retired them in order through the ninth.

In the fifth inning, deGrom allowed a leadoff walk to Alex Gordon and subsequent single to Alex Rios before Alcides Escobar's RBI single tied the game. Ben Zobrist's groundout moved the runners up and after Lorenzo Cain lined out to center, Eric Hosmer's two-run single put the Royals up 3–1. Kendrys Morales's single moved Hosmer to third and Mike Moustakas's single made it 4-1 Royals.

The Royals blew the game open in the eighth off of Jon Niese, who allowed a leadoff single to Moustakas, subsequent single to Salvador Pérez, and RBI double to Gordon. Addison Reed relieved Niese and allowed a sacrifice fly to Paulo Orlando and RBI triple to Escobar to make it 7-1 Kansas City.

Cueto walked Murphy with two outs in the ninth before getting Cespedes to fly out to right to finish the complete game, becoming the first AL pitcher to accomplish this feat in the World Series since Jack Morris in Game 7 of the 1991 World Series, as the Royals defeated the Mets and took a two games to zero lead in the series. Cueto became the first AL pitcher since Jim Lonborg in the 1967 World Series to throw a World Series complete game while allowing two hits or fewer.

=== Game 3 ===
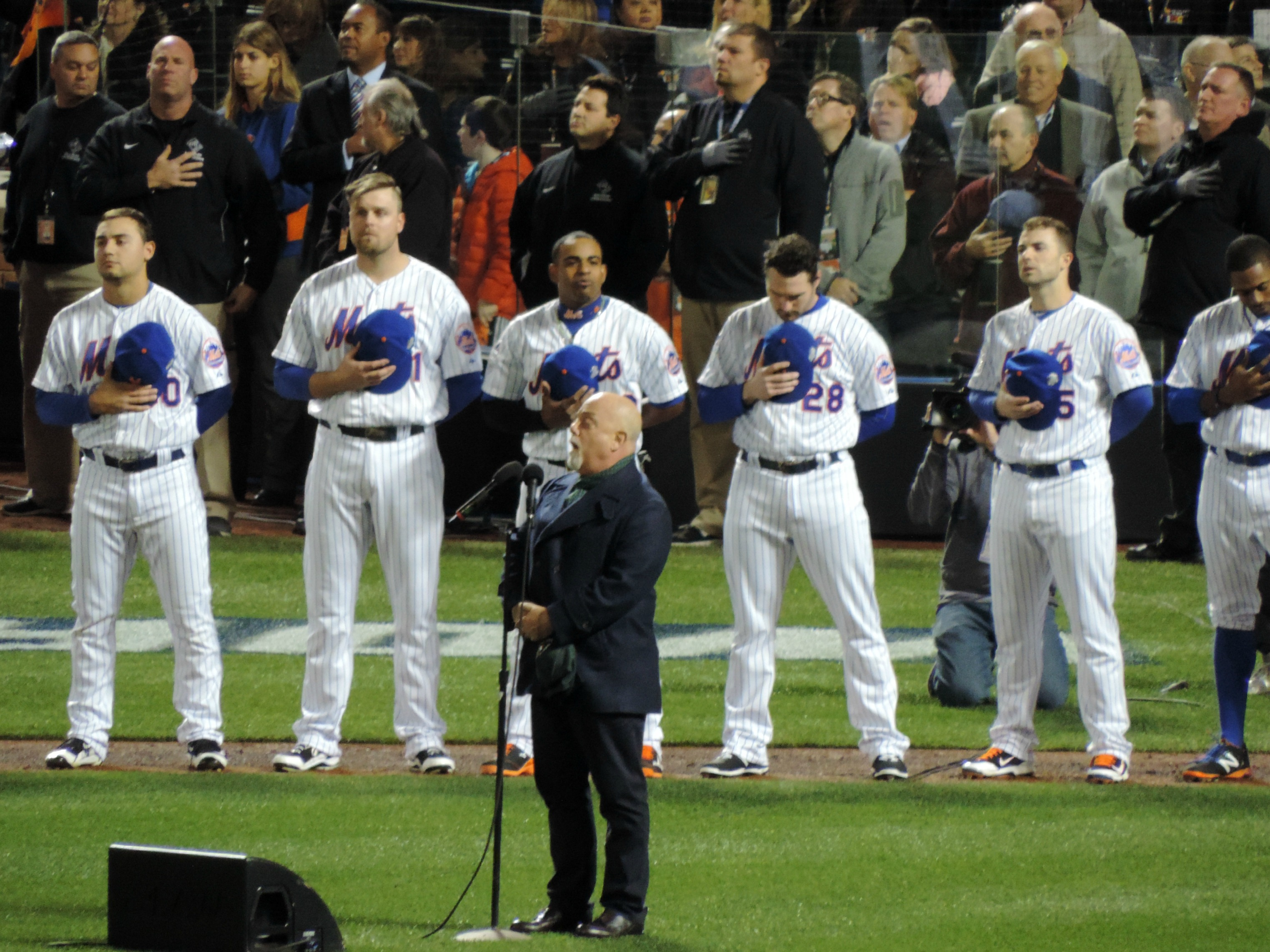
Billy Joel sang the National Anthem before Game 3.

October 30, 2015 8:08 pm (EDT) at Citi Field in Queens, New York, 52 °F (11 °C), clear
Team	1	2	3	4	5	6	7	8	9	R	H	E
Kansas City	1	2	0	0	0	0	0	0	0	3	7	0
New York	2	0	2	1	0	4	0	0	X	9	12	0
WP: Noah Syndergaard (1–0) LP: Yordano Ventura (0–1); Home runs: KC: None; NYM: David Wright (1), Curtis Granderson (2); Attendance: 44,781; Boxscore

The series shifted to Citi Field, the home stadium of the Mets, for Game 3. Yordano Ventura started for the Royals and Noah Syndergaard started for the Mets. The ceremonial first pitch was thrown by Mike Piazza to catcher Kevin Plawecki while New York native Billy Joel sang the national anthem. With no designated hitter (DH) in NL parks, the Mets started Michael Conforto, their DH for Game 2, in the outfield instead of Juan Lagares, and the Royals did not start Kendrys Morales, their regular DH.

Zobrist scored for the Royals in the first inning on a force play. In the bottom of the first inning, Wright hit a two-run homer that also scored Granderson. For the Royals, Alex Ríos drove Salvador Pérez home in the second inning, and scored on a passed ball by d'Arnaud, giving the Royals a 3–2 lead. After a Syndergaard single, Granderson hit a two-run home run just over the right field wall in the third inning, and the Mets took a 4–3 lead. The Mets added a run in the fourth inning on an RBI single by Conforto, and four more in the sixth inning, including an RBI single by Juan Uribe, in his first at bat since September 20. The Royals made a few uncharacteristic mistakes in this game, the first coming in the fourth inning when pitcher Yordano Ventura forgot to cover the base on a ground ball to the first baseman, and the second in the sixth inning when Royals pitcher Franklin Morales triple-clutched Granderson's ground ball, allowing all runners to be safe, which led to a 2-run single by Wright.

In the fifth inning, Royals player Raúl A. Mondesí made his Major League Baseball debut, pinch hitting for Danny Duffy. Mondesí became the first player ever to make his MLB debut in the World Series.

=== Game 4 ===
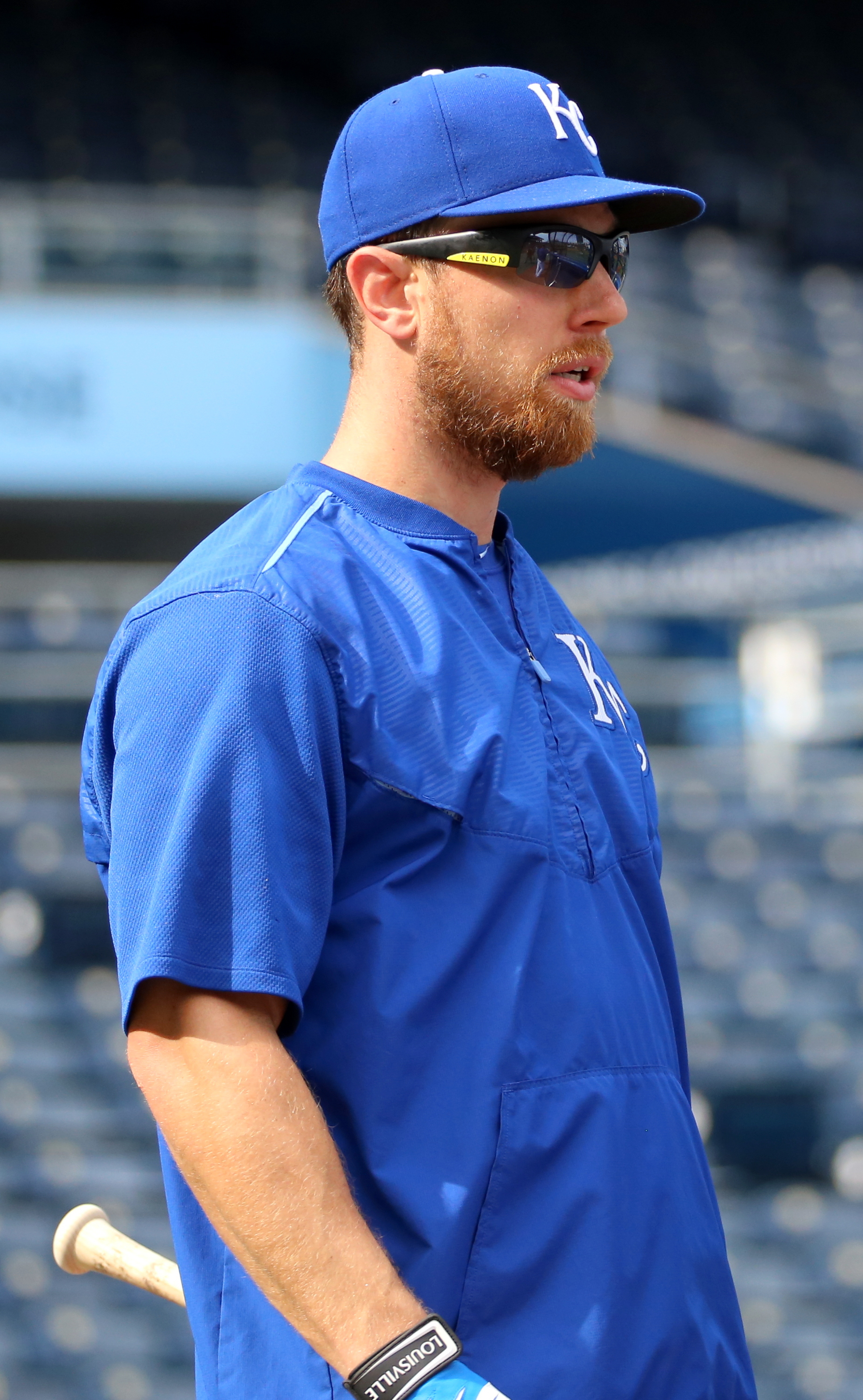
Ben Zobrist hit his eighth double of the postseason, tying a postseason record previously set by Albert Pujols and David Freese of the 2011 St. Louis Cardinals.

October 31, 2015 8:08 pm (EDT) at Citi Field in Queens, New York, 51 °F (11 °C), cloudy
Team	1	2	3	4	5	6	7	8	9	R	H	E
Kansas City	0	0	0	0	1	1	0	3	0	5	9	0
New York	0	0	2	0	1	0	0	0	0	3	5	2
WP: Ryan Madson (1–0) LP: Tyler Clippard (0–1) Sv: Wade Davis (1); Home runs: KC: None; NYM: Michael Conforto 2 (2); Attendance: 44,815; Boxscore

The ceremonial first pitch was thrown out by country singer Tim McGraw, son of former Mets relief pitcher Tug McGraw while Demi Lovato sang the national anthem. The starting pitchers for Game 4 were Chris Young of the Royals and Steven Matz of the Mets. Conforto scored the game's first run with a home run in the third inning, and Flores scored later in the inning on a Granderson sacrifice fly, when right-fielder Ríos did not make an immediate throw home (thinking his catch was the third out of the inning). The Royals cut the deficit to 2–1 in the top of the fifth when Pérez doubled and was then driven in by Gordon. However, in the bottom of the fifth, Conforto hit another home run, becoming the first rookie to hit two home runs in a World Series game since Andruw Jones in 1996. In the sixth inning, Zobrist hit his eighth double of the postseason, tying a postseason record previously set by Albert Pujols and David Freese of the 2011 St. Louis Cardinals. Lorenzo Cain drove in Zobrist in to make it a 3–2 game.

In the eighth inning, after recording the first out, Tyler Clippard walked two consecutive batters to force Terry Collins to bring in Familia. A key fielding error by Daniel Murphy allowed the tying run to score. The Royals took the lead on an RBI single from Moustakas, and then Pérez added an insurance run with another RBI base hit to give Kansas City the 5–3 lead. For Familia, it was his second blown save of the series, and second out of seven opportunities this postseason, though this one could be partly attributed to Murphy's error. Wade Davis converted a two-inning save for the Royals, his fourth overall this postseason. Davis pitched a perfect eighth, but got into some trouble with one out in the ninth when Murphy hit a hard grounder that Moustakas could not field cleanly, and then Céspedes got a base hit to bring the winning run to the plate in Duda. However, Duda hit a soft line drive that was caught by Moustakas, who then doubled off Céspedes at first to end the game. Céspedes had started running thinking the ball would hit the ground.

=== Game 5 ===
External videos
- Game 5 Full replay on MLB's official YouTube channel

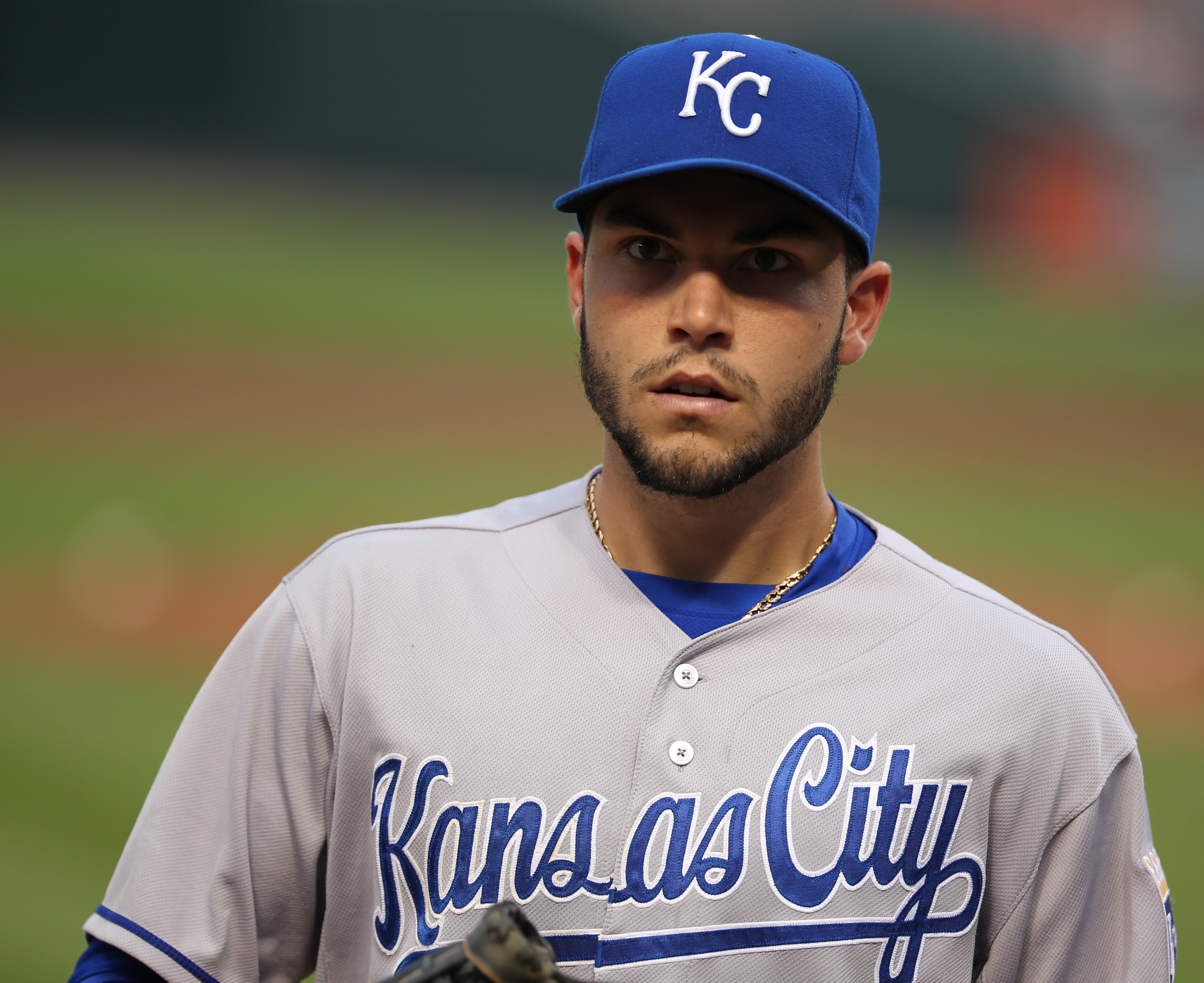
Eric Hosmer scored the tying run in the top of the ninth inning.

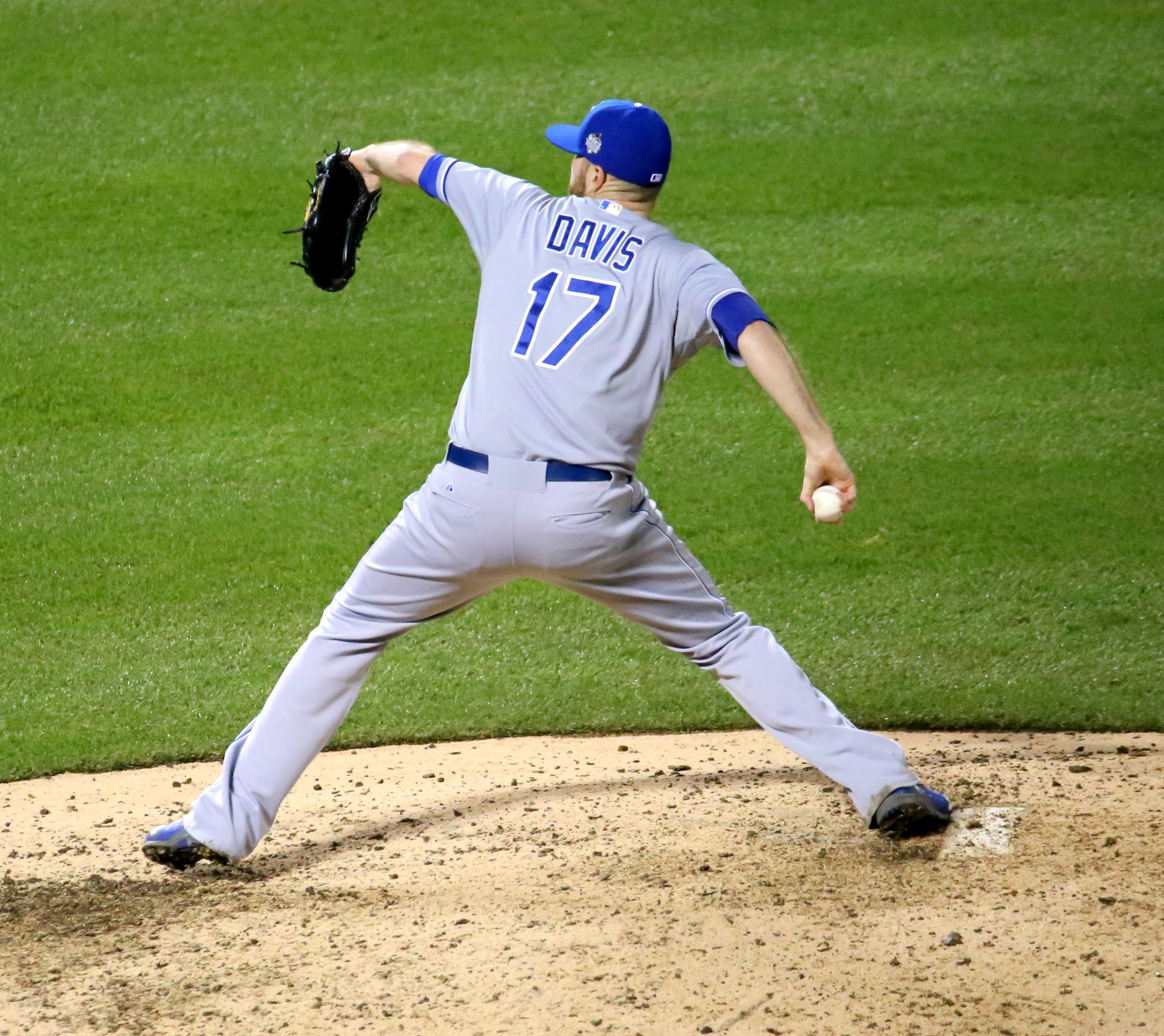
Wade Davis throwing the last pitch of the 2015 World Series.

November 1, 2015 8:18 pm (EST) at Citi Field in Queens, New York, 61 °F (16 °C), cloudy
Team	1	2	3	4	5	6	7	8	9	10	11	12	R	H	E
Kansas City	0	0	0	0	0	0	0	0	2	0	0	5	7	10	1
New York	1	0	0	0	0	1	0	0	0	0	0	0	2	4	2
WP: Luke Hochevar (1–0) LP: Addison Reed (0–1); Home runs: KC: None; NYM: Curtis Granderson (3); Attendance: 44,859; Boxscore

Vólquez returned to the Dominican Republic for his father's funeral the day after Game 1, but he returned in time to start Game 5. Harvey started for the Mets. New York City Fire Department firefighter Frank Pizarro sang the national anthem, New York native Tony Bennett performed "America the Beautiful", and the first pitches were thrown by Cleon Jones, Mookie Wilson, and Darryl Strawberry.

Granderson led off the first inning with a home run for the Mets, and scored the Mets' second run in the sixth inning. The Mets had a chance to break the game open in that sixth inning as they loaded the bases with no outs, but had to settle for one run after Céspedes lined a foul ball off his leg and was injured, leaving the game after popping up for the first out of the inning. Duda hit a sacrifice fly before d'Arnaud grounded out to end the inning. Harvey pitched eight shutout innings for the Mets, and convinced Collins to keep him in the game for the ninth. He then gave up a leadoff walk to Cain in the ninth inning, and the Royals got a run when Hosmer drove Cain in with a double, prompting Collins to call upon Familia to relieve Harvey. After a groundout by Moustakas advanced Hosmer to third base with one out, Pérez hit a ground ball to third baseman David Wright. Wright, after checking Hosmer at third, threw to first base for the second out; however, Hosmer broke for home as soon as the ball was thrown. Duda, who fielded the out at first, threw wide at home attempting to throw Hosmer out, and the latter scored the tying run. This resulted in Familia blowing his third save of the postseason and the series; his eight save opportunities tied the postseason record set in 2002 by Robb Nen.

In the top of the 12th inning, with Addison Reed pitching for the Mets, Pérez hit a single for the Royals. Pinch running for Pérez, Dyson stole a base and scored on a single by pinch hitter Christian Colón. Colón scored on a hit by Escobar. The Royals loaded the bases, and Cain drove home three more runs with a double off of Bartolo Colón. Davis pitched a shutout inning for the Royals to complete the series and win the championship. With Game 5 having crept well past midnight eastern time, Flores struck out looking to end the game, series, and baseball season, with the Royals winning and ending their 30-year World Series title drought.

Pérez, who batted 8-for-22 (.364) in the series, and caught every inning for the Royals with the exception of the final inning of the series, won the World Series Most Valuable Player Award. He became the first catcher to win the award since Pat Borders won it in the 1992 World Series, and the second Venezuelan player, following Pablo Sandoval, who won it in the 2012 World Series. Paulo Orlando made history as the first Brazilian player to win the World Series and the third South American to do so, the first was the Venezuelan player Luis Aparicio and the second was the Colombian player Edgar Rentería.

=== Composite line score ===
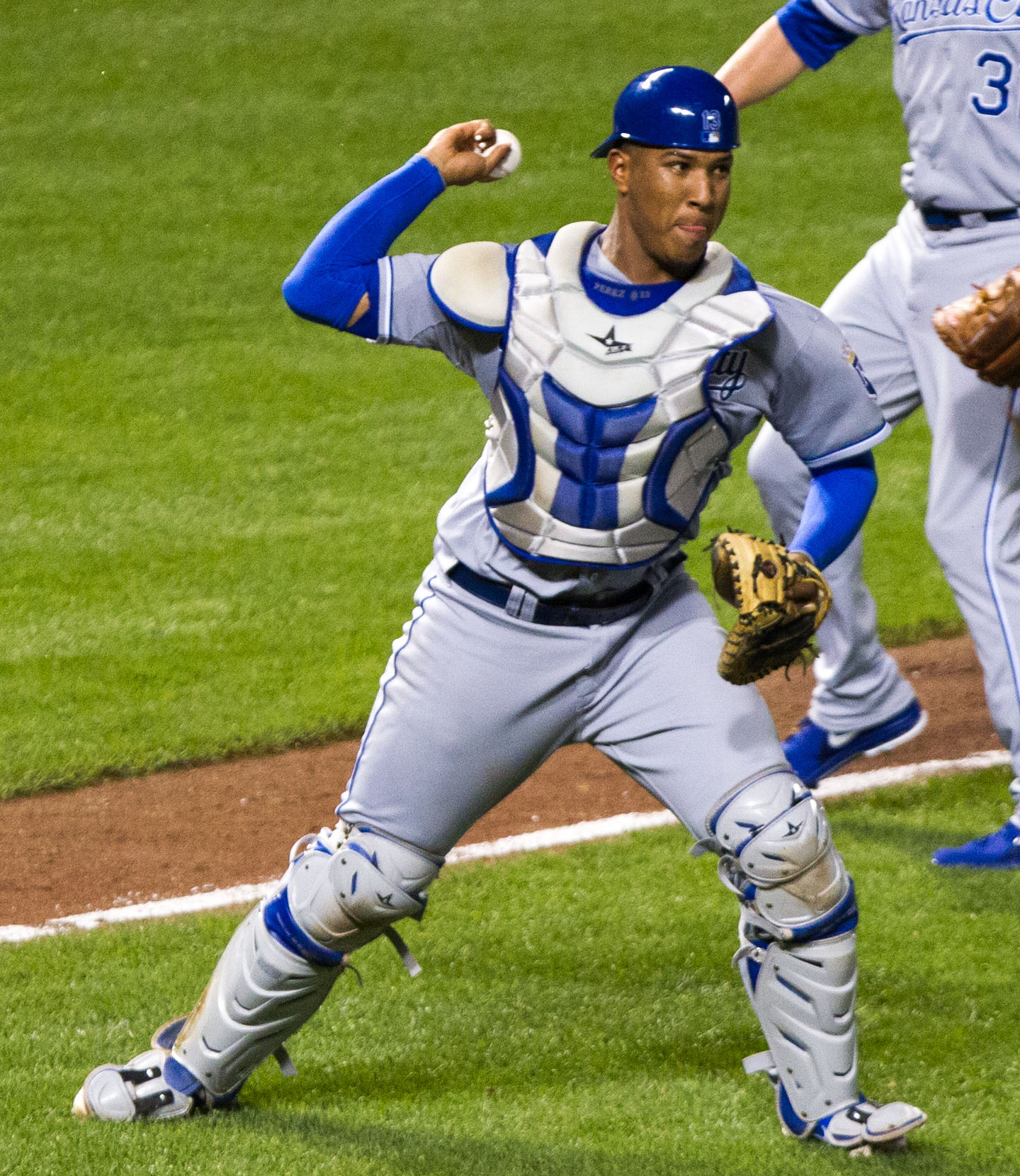
Salvador Pérez was named the Most Valuable Player of the series.

2015 World Series (4–1): Kansas City Royals (AL) beat New York Mets (NL).

Team	1	2	3	4	5	6	7	8	9	10	11	12	13	14	R	H	E
Kansas City Royals	2	2	0	0	5	3	0	6	3	0	0	5	0	1	27	47	2
New York Mets	3	0	4	3	2	6	0	1	0	0	0	0	0	0	19	34	6
Home runs: KC: Alcides Escobar (1), Alex Gordon (1); NYM: Curtis Granderson (3), David Wright (1), Michael Conforto (2); Total attendance: 215,185 Average attendance: 43,037; Winning player's share: $370,069.03. Losing player's share: $300,757.78.

== Broadcasting ==
=== Television ===
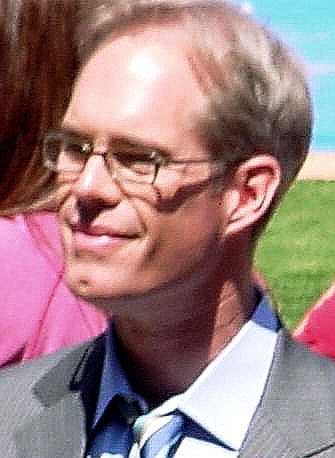
Joe Buck, play-by-play announcer

Fox broadcast the series in the United States, with play-by-play announcer Joe Buck calling the action along with color analysts Harold Reynolds and Tom Verducci and field reporters Ken Rosenthal and Erin Andrews. The pregame and postgame show featured host Kevin Burkhardt with analysts Frank Thomas, Raul Ibanez, Pete Rose, and Alex Rodriguez. Fox Deportes offered a Spanish telecast of the series in the United States. The MLB International feed featured Matt Vasgersian and John Smoltz with play-by-play and analysis, respectively.

Fox suffered an outage during their broadcast of Game 1. A technical difficulties graphic was used with a Fox Sports logo on top and a "We are experiencing Technical Difficulties, Please Stand By" message on the bottom in a Fox Sports template background, followed by a five-minute delay while officials addressed the availability of video review due to the loss of Fox's feed; the teams agreed to allow the use of footage from the world feed of the game for video review. Fox temporarily switched to the MLB International feed of the game with Vasgersian and Smoltz to restore coverage. The video from the feed was then accompanied by Fox's commentators before the full Fox production was restored.

The World Series started on a Tuesday for the second straight year, instead of a Wednesday as in the past. The practice was to avoid games on Thursday and Monday nights, generally big days of television viewing, where Fox's telecast would face stiff competition from Thursday Night Football, ESPN College Football Thursday Primetime, various popular primetime entertainment shows, and Monday Night Football. Had the World Series gone to a Game 6, it would have competed against Election Day coverage for the first time in World Series history, though 2015 was not a presidential or midterm election. All World Series held since 2015 were scheduled to complete prior to Election Day.

==== Ratings ====
Game 1 of the World Series averaged a 4.6 rating on Fox, making it the most watched Game 1 since the 2010 World Series. Game 2 then had a 3.9 rating, up 24 percent from last season's Game 2. The series also recorded the most watched Game 3 since 2009.

Game 5 went head-to-head with an NBC Sunday Night Football game between the Green Bay Packers and the Denver Broncos (both undefeated). Media sources like Sporting News predicted this heavy competition would result in series-low ratings. While the football game drew the larger audience, the Royals and Mets did average a 10.0 rating, the highest for a World Series Game 5 since 2003.

Game	Ratings (households)	Share (households)	U.S. audience (in millions)	Ref
1	9.0	17	14.94	
2	8.3	12	13.72	
3	9.07	15	13.20	
4	9.29	11	13.58	
5	11.66	13	17.20	

=== Radio ===
ESPN Radio aired the series, with Dan Shulman on play-by-play, Aaron Boone handling color commentary, and Buster Olney serving as field reporter. Tampa Bay Rays pitcher Chris Archer served as a guest commentator for selected innings in Games 1, 2 and 5. Marc Kestecher anchored pre-game and post-game coverage for the network along with Chris Singleton and Peter Pascarelli.

Locally, the series was broadcast on the teams' flagship radio stations with their respective announcing crews. In New York, WOR aired the games in English, with Howie Rose and Josh Lewin announcing, while WEPN-AM aired the games in Spanish, with Juan Alicea and Max Pérez Jiménez announcing. In Kansas City, KCSP broadcast the games, with Denny Matthews, Ryan Lefebvre, Steve Stewart, and Steve Physioc announcing. WEPN-FM and WHB, the ESPN Radio affiliates in New York and Kansas City respectively, aired the network's coverage of the series in those cities.

== Aftermath ==
Johnny Cueto's Game 2 pitching gem was the most recent World Series complete game until Yoshinobu Yamamoto’s Game 2 complete game in the 2025 World Series, nearly a full 10 years to the date of Cueto’s, on October 25, 2025.

The Royals became the first team and in World Series history to start three pitchers—Yordano Ventura, Edinson Volquez, and Cueto—born outside the United States. Later, the Astros would accomplish this feat when they started four foreign-born pitchers in the 2021 World Series.

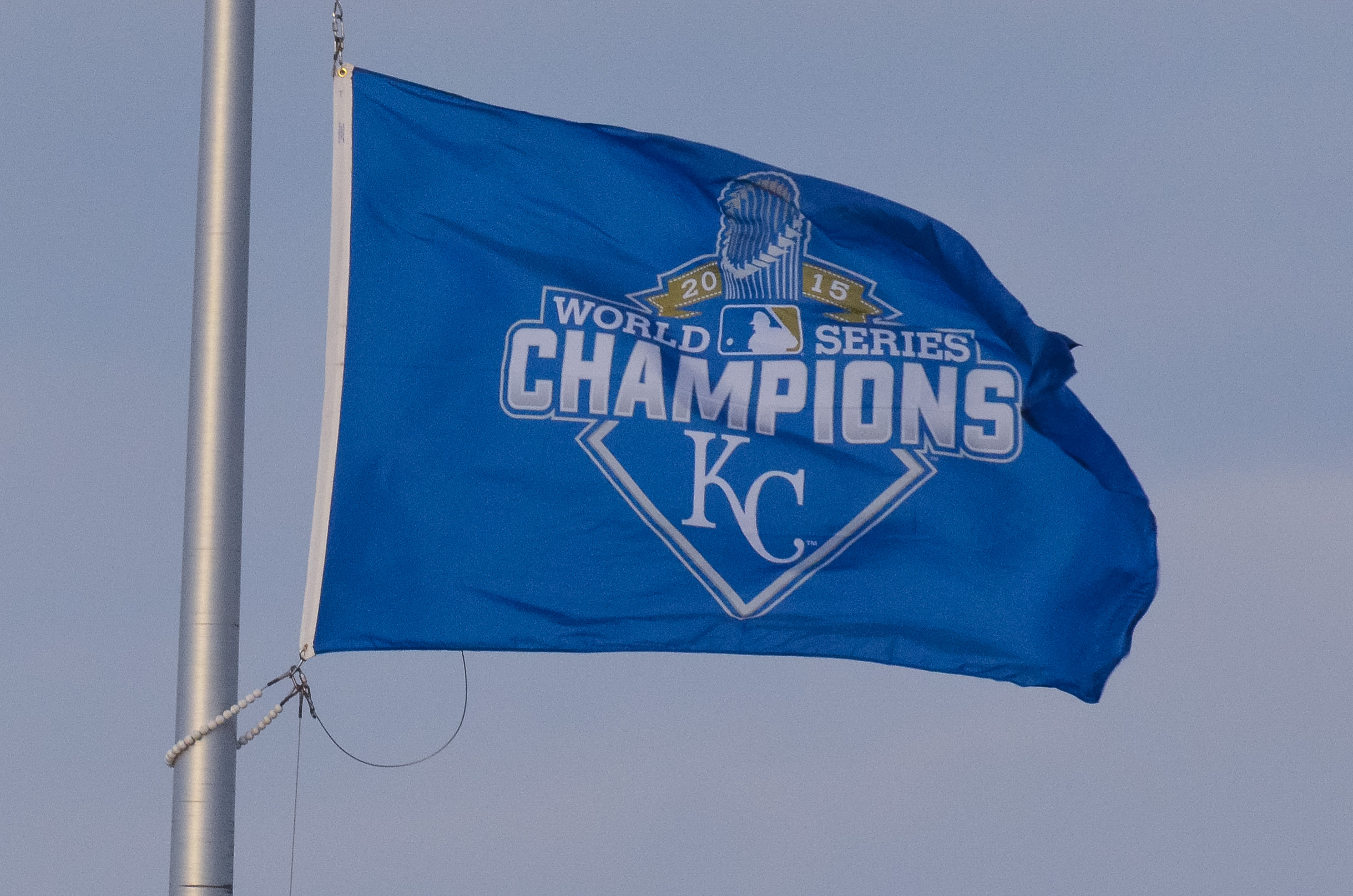
Kansas City Royals' 2015 World Series flag, which was raised the opening night against the Mets.

The Mets and Royals met on Opening Day of the 2016 season, on April 3, 2016, for a Sunday Night Baseball game in Kansas City. It was the first ever time in MLB history a defending champion opened against the team they beat in the World Series. The Mets and Royals split the short two-game series to start the season, while the Mets would sweep the other half of their four games season series at Citi Field in June.

As was the case with their 1985 championship, the Royals missed the postseason a year after winning the World Series. After 81 and 80-win seasons for the next two years, a pair of 100-loss seasons followed in 2018 and 2019, during which management dismantled the core of the 2015 team and Ned Yost retired from managing. Of the players who played for the 2015 Royals, only Salvador Pérez remained with the team as of 2026. The Mets qualified for the 2016 National League Wild Card Game after an 87-win season, but lost to the San Francisco Giants. This was followed by a 70-win season in Terry Collins' final year as manager. Both teams would next win a postseason series a day apart in 2024 when both won their respective Wild Card Series match-ups (against Baltimore and Milwaukee, respectively) to advance to the Division Series.

This was the only World Series appearance by a New York City team during the 2010s decade. The 2010s became the first decade since the 1910s that a team from New York City failed to win a World Series.

=== Back to the Future prediction ===
In the 1989 film Back to the Future Part II, the Chicago Cubs are depicted as the 2015 World Series champions, defeating a fictional American League team from Miami, whose mascot is an alligator, in a five-game sweep ending on or before October 21. Screenwriter Bob Gale, who co-wrote the script of Back to the Future Part II, originally intended it as a joke, saying "Being a baseball fan, I thought, 'OK, let's come up with one of the most unlikely scenarios we can think of'", referencing both the Cubs' long championship drought (at the time, having most recently won the 1908 World Series) and the lack (at the time) of any major-league franchise in Florida. He also explained that the October 21 prediction was based on the postseason structure at the time of writing (prior to Division Series or Wild Card Series), and thus could have been accurate.

In the actual 2015 postseason, the Cubs advanced to the National League Championship Series (NLCS), but were swept in four games by the New York Mets. The final game of that series took place on October 21, the same date as the fictional events in the film. One year later, however, the Cubs did win the World Series, beating the Cleveland Indians in seven games.

== See also ==
- 2015 Japan Series
- 2015 Korean Series
