= Yordano Ventura =

Dominican baseball player (1991–2017)

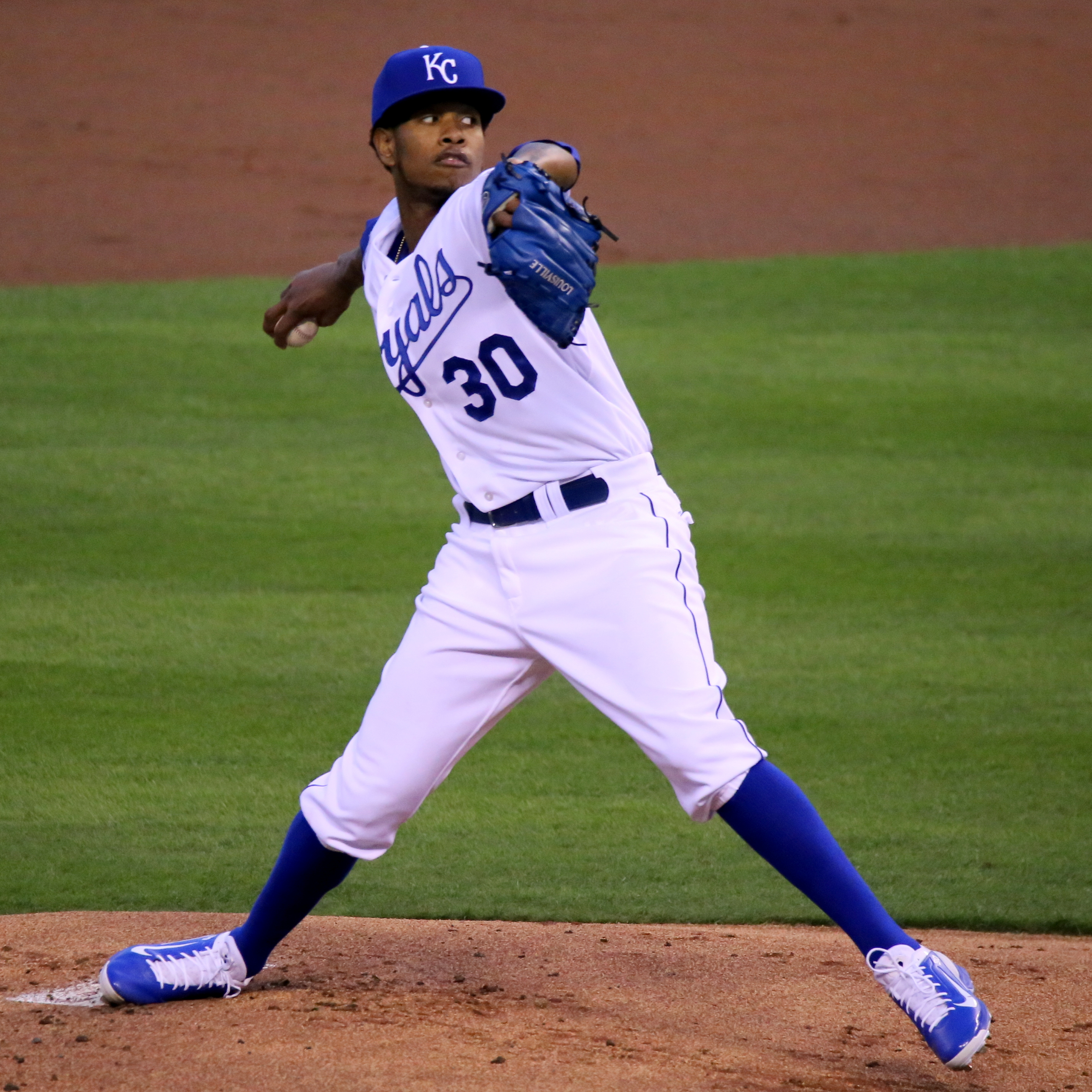
- Ventura with the Kansas City Royals in 2015
- Pitcher
- Born: June 3, 1991; Samaná, Dominican Republic
- Died: January 22, 2017 (aged 25); Juan Adrián, Dominican Republic
- Batted: Right Threw: Right

MLB debut
- September 17, 2013, for the Kansas City Royals

Last MLB appearance
- September 30, 2016, for the Kansas City Royals

MLB statistics
- Win–loss record: 38–31
- Earned run average: 3.89
- Strikeouts: 470
- Stats at Baseball Reference

Teams
- Kansas City Royals (2013–2016)

Career highlights and awards
- World Series champion (2015)

Yordano Ventura Hernández (Spanish: [ɟʝoɾˈðano βenˈtuɾa]; June 3, 1991 – January 22, 2017) was a Dominican professional baseball pitcher for the Kansas City Royals of Major League Baseball (MLB). Ventura made his MLB debut on September 17, 2013. Known as a power pitcher, his fastball topped out at 102 miles per hour (164 km/h) in his career. He won the 2015 World Series with the Royals. On January 22, 2017, Ventura was killed in a car crash in the Dominican Republic.

== Early life ==
Ventura was born in Samaná, Dominican Republic, in 1991. He was raised in Las Terrenas. After quitting school at the age of 14, he worked in construction until joining a baseball academy run by the Kansas City Royals of Major League Baseball.

== Professional career ==
=== Minor leagues (2008–2013) ===
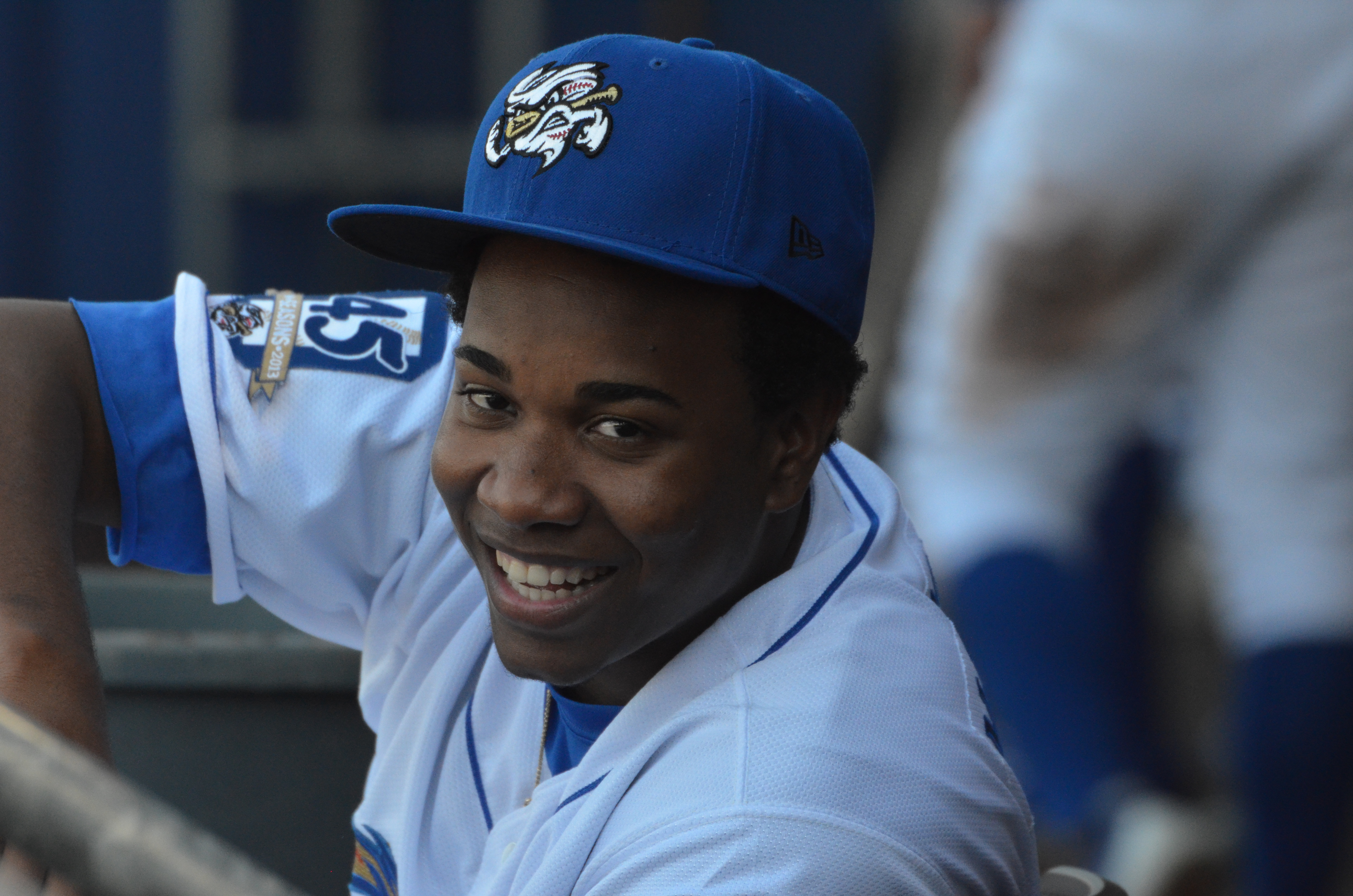
Ventura with the Omaha Storm Chasers

Ventura signed with the Royals as an international free agent on October 8, 2008, receiving a $28,000 signing bonus. He spent the next 18 months training at the Royals' academy. Ventura played for the Kane County Cougars of the Class A Midwest League in 2011. In 19 games started for the Cougars, Ventura had a 4–6 win–loss record and a 4.27 earned run average (ERA) with 88 strikeouts in 84 1/3 innings pitched. Ventura began the 2012 season with the Wilmington Blue Rocks of the Class A-Advanced Carolina League, and was named to appear in both the Carolina-California League All-Star Game and the All-Star Futures Game. He was promoted to the Northwest Arkansas Naturals of the Class AA Texas League later that season.

The Royals invited Ventura to spring training for 2013. Ventura began the 2013 season with Northwest Arkansas, but received a promotion to the Omaha Storm Chasers of the Class AAA Pacific Coast League (PCL) in June, after he pitched to a 2.34 ERA and 74 strikeouts in 57 2/3 innings pitched with the Storm Chasers. He was again named to the World Team's roster for the All-Star Futures Game. He was named Royals’ 2013 co-Minor League Player of the Year with pitcher Lane Adams.

=== Kansas City Royals (2013–2016) ===
==== 2013 season ====
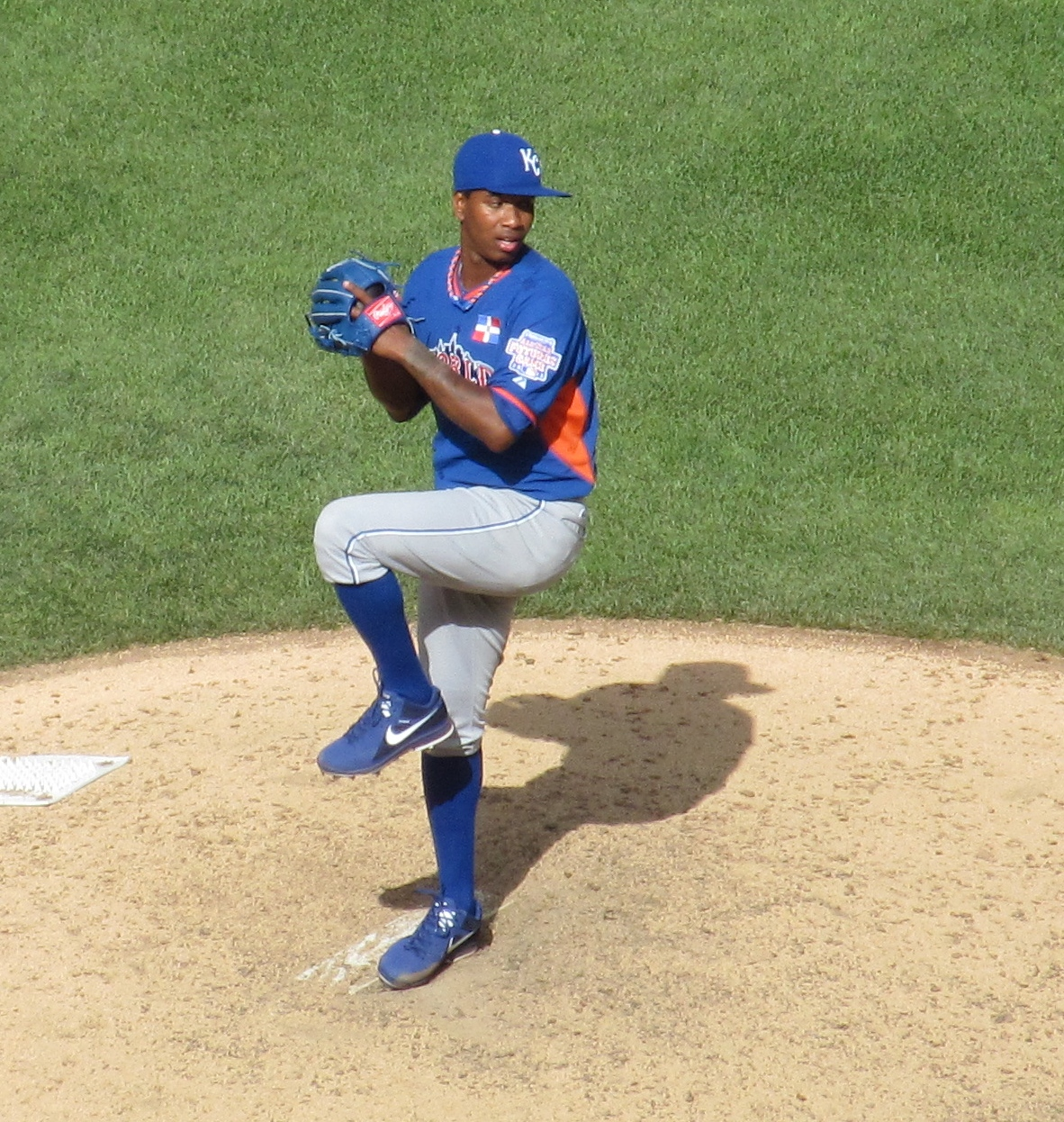
Ventura pitching in the 2013 All-Star Futures Game

The Royals promoted Ventura to the major leagues to make his debut on September 16, 2013, following the Storm Chasers' victory in the PCL championship series. He pitched for the Royals instead of pitching for the Storm Chasers in the Triple-A Baseball National Championship Game against the Durham Bulls of the International League. In three starts for the Royals, Ventura pitched to a 3.52 ERA.

==== 2014 season ====
During spring training in 2014, Ventura won the final spot in the Royals' starting rotation over Danny Duffy. During the 2014 regular season, Ventura went 14–10 with a 3.20 ERA. He started the second game of the 2014 American League Division Series (ALDS) between the Royals and Angels on October 3, 2014, pitching seven innings and giving up one run, in a game the Royals won 4–1 over the Angels. In Game 2 of the World Series against the San Francisco Giants Ventura allowed two runs in a 7–2 win for the Royals. In Game 6, with the team down in the series 3–2, Ventura threw seven shutout innings in a 10–0 victory, forcing a Game 7. Prior to the game, Ventura had dedicated his performance to his friend and fellow countryman Oscar Taveras who was killed in a car crash on October 26, at age 22. Ventura pitched the game with the message "RIP O.T #18" written on his hat.

==== 2015 season ====
Ventura signed a five-year, $23 million contract with the Royals before the 2015 season. Named the Royals' 2015 Opening Day starting pitcher, he started against the Chicago White Sox on April 6, 2015, where he pitched six innings until leaving the game with a right thumb cramp. He got plenty of support as the Royals won 10–1 over the White Sox.

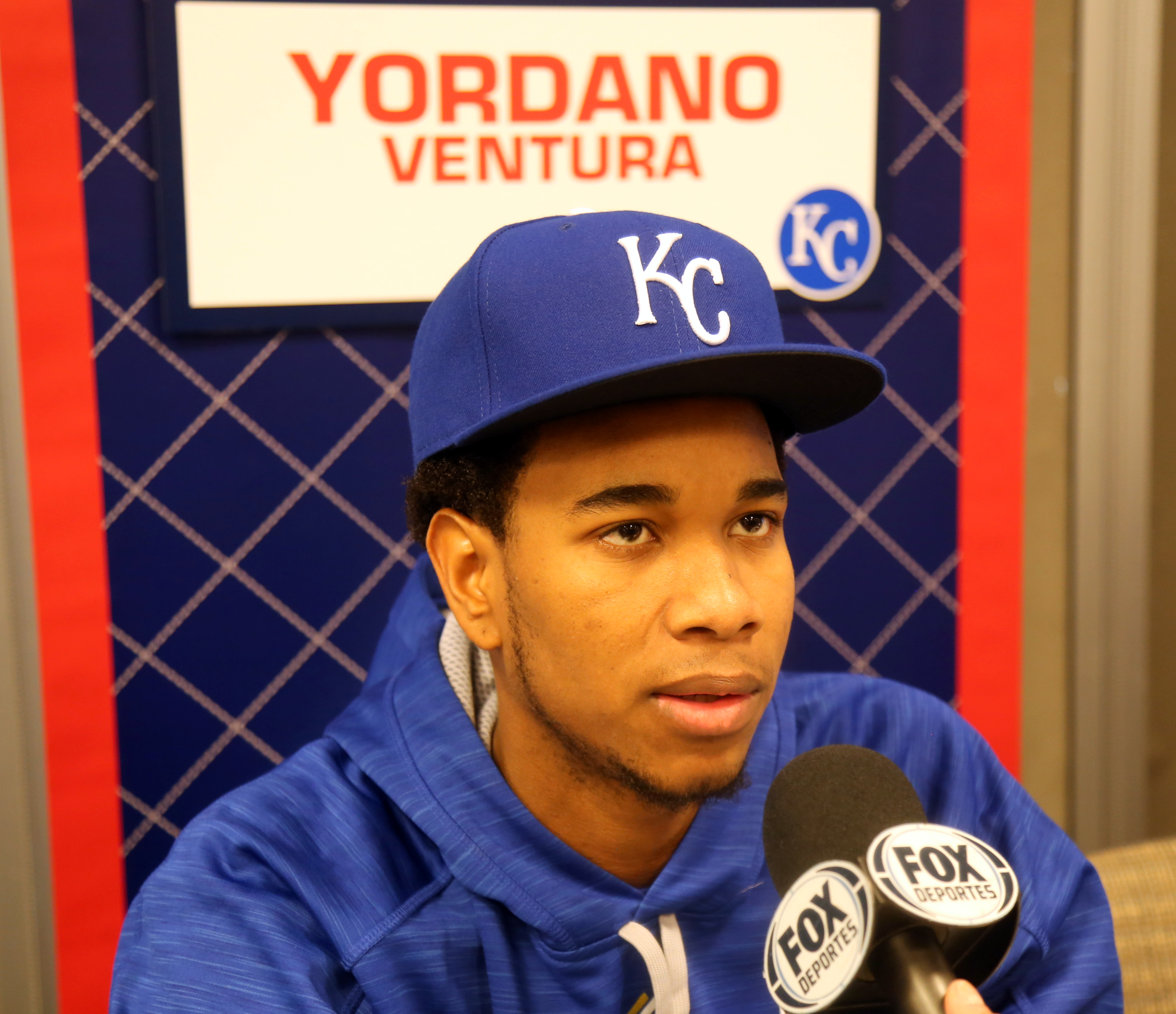
Ventura talking to the media before the 2015 World Series

In April 2015, Ventura was involved in bench-clearing incidents in three consecutive starts. During an April 12 game against the Los Angeles Angels, Ventura stared down Mike Trout after a single up the middle. After Trout scored later in the inning, Ventura again confronted him and the benches cleared. During a game against the Oakland Athletics on April 18, 2015, Ventura was ejected for the first time in his MLB career after intentionally hitting Brett Lawrie with a pitch. On April 22, Ventura was fined an undisclosed amount and was not suspended for any games. The next day, Ventura exchanged words with White Sox outfielder Adam Eaton that Ventura was thought to have instigated as he fielded Eaton's ground ball, which initiated a bench-clearing brawl between the two teams. Five total players, including Ventura, were ejected. On April 25, 2015, Ventura was suspended for seven games. He had the option to appeal but dropped it on April 30, so the suspension would take effect.

Ventura pitched to a 5.19 ERA before the Royals optioned him to Omaha on July 21. Jason Vargas, his replacement in the starting rotation, injured his elbow that night, and Ventura was recalled the next day. During the 2015 regular season, Ventura pitched to a 13–8 record with a 4.08 ERA and 156 strikeouts. He led all major league pitchers with an average fastball velocity of 96.4 miles per hour (155.1 km/h).

On October 8, Ventura pitched Game 1 of the 2015 ALDS against the Houston Astros, exiting after two innings and giving up three earned runs in what became a 5–2 loss. In Game 4 on October 12 he pitched 5 innings in a 9–6 win over the Astros. Ventura gave up the lead in the fifth inning, but the Royals rallied to score seven runs off the Houston bullpen. Ventura started Game 2 of the ALCS on October 17 against the Toronto Blue Jays, allowing 3 runs in a 6–3 Kansas City victory. He also pitched in the Royals pennant clinching Game 6 of that series on October 23, allowing only one run. Kansas City won 4–3 and advanced to the World Series. In Game 3 of the World Series against the New York Mets, Ventura gave up five runs and was the losing pitcher. In five postseason games he pitched to a 6.43 ERA and did not earn a win. Ventura and the Royals would go on to win the World Series in 5 games.

==== 2016 season ====
In a game against the Baltimore Orioles on June 7, 2016, Ventura threw several pitches inside to Manny Machado and the two exchanged words. Machado's next at-bat occurred in the fifth inning, with Baltimore leading 5–1. With the first pitch of the at-bat, Ventura hit Machado with a 99-mile-per-hour (159 km/h) fastball. Machado stormed after Ventura, causing a bench-clearing brawl. Both players were ejected. Two days later, Ventura was fined an undisclosed amount and suspended nine games, while Machado was suspended for four games. Ventura's suspension was reduced to eight games and he began serving it on June 18. He finished the 2016 season with an 11–12 win–loss record and a 4.45 ERA.

=== Scouting report ===
Ventura threw a fastball (four-seam, two-seam) topping out at 102 miles per hour (164 km/h). His repertoire of pitches also included a curveball and a change-up.

== Personal life ==
Ventura married Maria del Pilar Sangiovanni before the 2016 season. While playing for Kansas City, he would often visit pediatric cancer wards and gave away memorabilia.

== Death ==
On January 22, 2017 at age 25, Ventura died in a car crash in Juan Adrián, Dominican Republic. He lost control of his Jeep Wrangler, which flipped over on a curved road. Ventura was thrown out of the vehicle and was presumed dead by the time the authorities arrived. Ventura, who in the Dominican Republic was a member of the Águilas Cibaeñas, died the same day as major leaguer Andy Marte, who was killed in a separate car crash between San Francisco de Macorís and Pimentel in the Dominican Republic at the age of 33. Ventura had about $20 million outstanding on his Royals contract; how that money was disbursed was dependent on an official toxicology report that was not a matter of public record.

Ventura was buried in Las Terrenas. The mayor declared a mourning period of two days. The Royals honored Ventura by wearing patches that read "ACE 30" on their uniforms for the 2017 season.

== See also ==
- List of baseball players who died during their careers
- List of people from the Dominican Republic
