= Juan Adrián =

Juan Adrián Distrito Municipal Juan Adrián
- Juan Adrian
- Interactive map of Juan Adrián
- Location within the Dominican Republic
- Coordinates: 18°45′52″N 70°20′9″W
- Country: Dominican Republic
- Province: Monseñor Nouel
- Consolidado Distrito municipal: 2001

Government
  - Síndico de Juan Adrián: Reinaldo Pichardo

Area
  - Total: 60.50 km^{2} (23.36 sq mi)

Population (2023)
  - Total: 3,291
  - Density: 54.47/km^{2} (141.1/sq mi)
- Website: https://juntamunicipaljuanadrian.gob.do/

Juan Adrian is a town in the Monseñor Nouel province of the Dominican Republic.

== Sol De La Florida ==
- – World-Gazetteer.com
