= Ryan Lefebvre =

American sportscaster (born 1971)

- Born: February 12, 1971 (age 55); Los Angeles, California, U.S.
- Occupation: Sports announcer
- Employer: FanDuel Sports Network Kansas City
- Father: Jim Lefebvre

Ryan James Lefebvre (/ləˈfiːvər/; born February 12, 1971) is an American sportscaster, best known as a play-by-play announcer for Major League Baseball's Kansas City Royals since 1999. In 2008, he became the primary announcer for Royals' television broadcasts on FSN Kansas City. Lefebvre also provides play-by-play on the Royals Radio Network to give longtime Royals announcer Denny Matthews days off. Since the 2012 season, he has called most games.

Lefebvre was named Most Valuable Player for the Minnesota Golden Gophers in 1993, and made first-team All Big Ten in 1991 and 1993 as an outfielder. In 1992, he played collegiate summer baseball with the Falmouth Commodores of the Cape Cod Baseball League and was named a league all-star. Lefebvre spent one season in the Cleveland Indians minor league system with the Watertown Indians of the New York–Penn League.

Lefebvre had also broadcast TV and cable for the Minnesota Twins from 1995 to 1998.

He is the son of former Major League Baseball player and manager Jim Lefebvre.

In early 2006, Lefebvre made public his struggle with depressive illness. Lefebvre also wrote a book detailing his experiences, titled The Shame of Me: One Man's Journey to Depression and Back.

Ryan Lefebvre has spoken about the importance of his Catholic faith in overcoming depression and gaining a renewed perspective on life.
