= 2015 Kansas City Royals season =

47th Season of the Kansas City Royals

2015 Kansas City Royals
- World Series champions American League champions American League Central champions
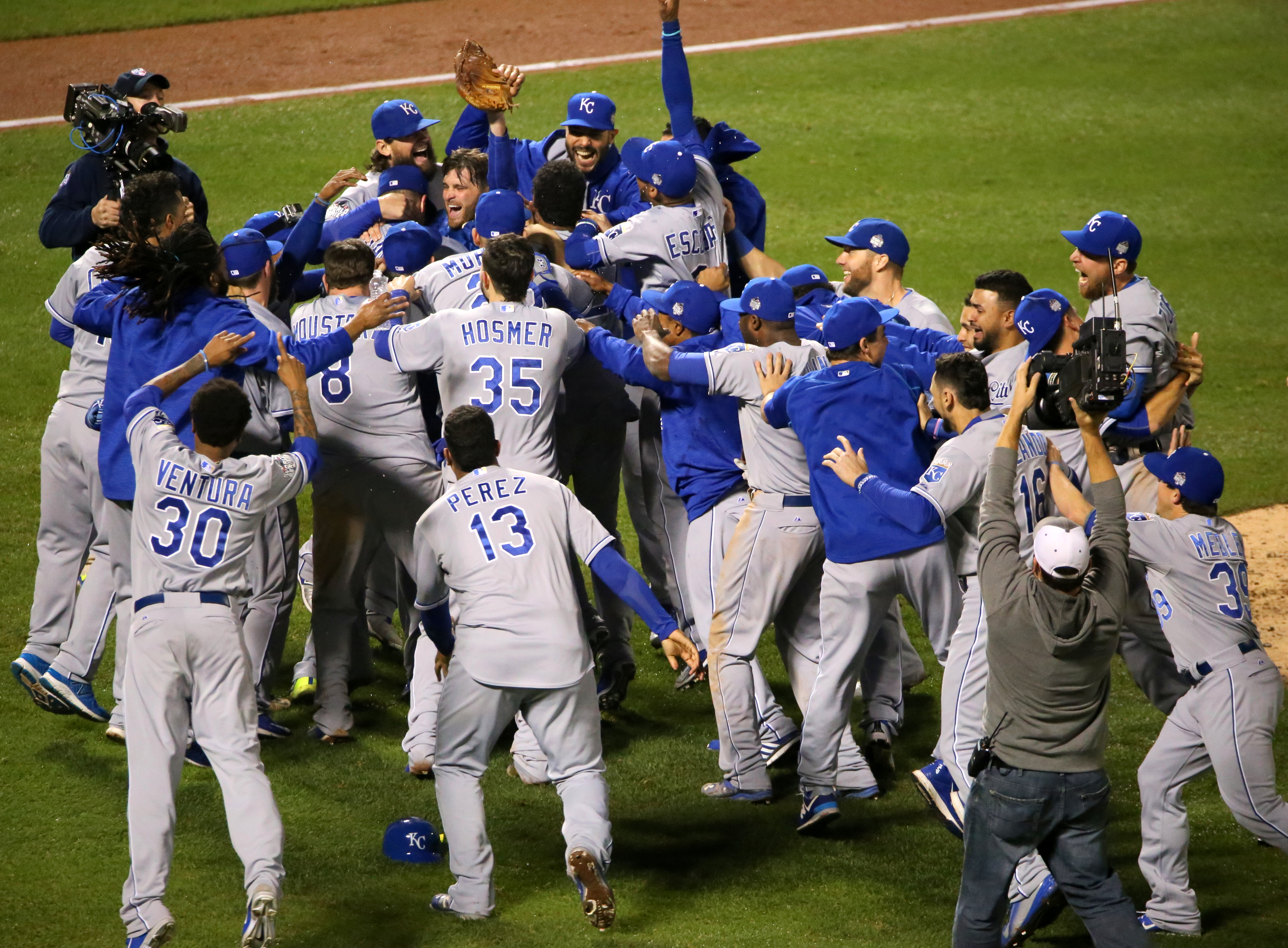
- The Royals celebrate at Citi Field in Queens, New York City, New York after winning the 2015 World Series, in which they defeated the New York Mets four games to one.
- League: American League
- Division: Central
- Ballpark: Kauffman Stadium
- City: Kansas City, Missouri
- Record: 95–67 (.586)
- Divisional place: 1st
- Owners: David Glass
- General managers: Dayton Moore
- Managers: Ned Yost
- Television: Fox Sports Kansas City (Ryan Lefebvre, Jeff Montgomery, Joel Goldberg, Rex Hudler, Steve Physioc)
- Radio: KCSP 610 AM (Denny Matthews, Steve Stewart, Ryan Lefebvre, Steve Physioc)

The 2015 Kansas City Royals season was the 47th for the franchise, and their 43rd at Kauffman Stadium.

The Royals made their second consecutive World Series appearance in 2015, after winning the American League in 2014. They won the series for the first time since 1985. The team won their first AL Central title on September 24, 2015, the first time the Royals won their division since 1985. They opened the playoffs by defeating the Houston Astros in five games in the ALDS and then defeated the Toronto Blue Jays in six games in the ALCS. They defeated the New York Mets in five games in the World Series, the second World Series championship in franchise history. The 2015 Royals were the first team since the 1989 Oakland Athletics to win the World Series after having lost the series in the previous season. This would not happen again until the 2022 Houston Astros would accomplish this feat. This would be the last season the Royals would make the playoffs until 2024.

== Offseason ==
October 30: Josh Willingham, James Shields, Raúl Ibañez, Luke Hochevar, Jason Frasor, Scott Downs, and Norichika Aoki become free agents.

- Hochevar and Frasor re-signed with the Royals.
- Downs signed with the Cleveland Indians.
- Aoki signed with the San Francisco Giants.
- Shields signed with the San Diego Padres.
- Willingham retired at age 34.
- Ibañez retired at age 42.

November 1: Billy Butler becomes a free agent. He would sign with the Oakland Athletics.

November 3: Promoted Paulo Orlando.

Week of November 5: Signed 4 players to a minor league contract, and invited 2 of them to spring training.

November 20: Received Reymond Fuentes from the San Diego Padres for Kyle Bartsch and promoted 2 other players.

November 24: Jayson Nix becomes a free agent while Juan Flores signs a minor league contract.

November 26: Received Ryan Jackson from the Los Angeles Dodgers for cash.

- Jackson would be sent to the minors.

November 28: Received Bryan Flynn and Reid Redman from the Miami Marlins for Aaron Crow. Signed Jason Frasor and also gave Ismaldo Rodriguez to a minor league contract.

December 2: Francisley Bueno becomes a free agent as Dany Geraldo signs a minor league contract.

December 8: Signed Gabriel Noriega to a minor league contract and invited him to spring training.

December 11: Received Jandel Gustave from the Boston Red Sox for cash.

December 14: Signed Angel Franco to a minor league contract.

Week of December 15:

- Signed 3 players to a minor league contract.
- Sent 3 players to the minors.
- Released Carlos Peguero.
- Signed Kendrys Morales, Alex Ríos, Kris Medlen, and Yohan Pino.
- Received Brian Broderick from the Los Angeles Angels for Johnny Giavotella.

December 28: Signed 3 players to a minor league contract.

December 29: Signed Edinson Vólquez.

January 4: Signed Ryan Madson to a minor league contract and invited him to spring training.

January 16: Signed 2 players to a minor league contract and invited them to spring training.

January 26: Invited 16 players to spring training and signed J. C. Boscán to a minor league contract and also invited him to spring training. Brian Bocock also signs a minor league contract.

== Season standings ==
=== American League Central ===
AL Central
Team	W	L	Pct.	GB	Home	Road
Kansas City Royals	95	67	.586	—	51‍–‍30	44‍–‍37
Minnesota Twins	83	79	.512	12	46‍–‍35	37‍–‍44
Cleveland Indians	81	80	.503	13½	39‍–‍41	42‍–‍39
Chicago White Sox	76	86	.469	19	40‍–‍41	36‍–‍45
Detroit Tigers	74	87	.460	20½	38‍–‍43	36‍–‍44

=== American League Wild Card ===
Division leaders
Team	W	L	Pct.
Kansas City Royals	95	67	.586
Toronto Blue Jays	93	69	.574
Texas Rangers	88	74	.543

Wild Card teams (Top 2 teams qualify for postseason)
Team	W	L	Pct.	GB
New York Yankees	87	75	.537	+1
Houston Astros	86	76	.531	—
Los Angeles Angels	85	77	.525	1
Minnesota Twins	83	79	.512	3
Cleveland Indians	81	80	.503	4½
Baltimore Orioles	81	81	.500	5
Tampa Bay Rays	80	82	.494	6
Boston Red Sox	78	84	.481	8
Chicago White Sox	76	86	.469	10
Seattle Mariners	76	86	.469	10
Detroit Tigers	74	87	.460	11½
Oakland Athletics	68	94	.420	18

=== Record against opponents ===
2015 American League record Source: MLB Standings Grid – 2015
Team	BAL	BOS	CWS	CLE	DET	HOU	KC	LAA	MIN	NYY	OAK	SEA	TB	TEX	TOR	NL
Baltimore	—	11–8	3–3	5–1	4–3	3–4	3–4	2–4	0–7	10–9	6–1	3–3	10–9	1–6	8–11	12–8
Boston	8–11	—	3–4	2–4	4–2	2–4	4–3	2–5	2–5	8–11	5–1	4–3	9–10	2–5	10–9	13–7
Chicago	3–3	4–3	—	10–9	9–10	5–1	7–12	4–3	6–13	2–5	5–2	4–3	1–5	3–3	4–3	9–11
Cleveland	1–5	4–2	9–10	—	7–11	5–2	9–10	4–2	7–12	5–2	3–4	4–3	5–2	3–3	3–4	12–8
Detroit	3–4	2–4	10–9	11–7	—	3–4	9–10	1–6	11–8	2–5	2–4	4–3	3–3	2–5	2–4	9–11
Houston	4–3	4–2	1–5	2–5	4–3	—	4–2	10–9	3–3	4–3	10–9	12–7	2–5	6–13	4–3	16–4
Kansas City	4–3	3–4	12–7	10–9	10–9	2–4	—	6–1	12–7	2–4	5–1	4–2	6–1	3–4	3–4	13–7
Los Angeles	4–2	5–2	3–4	2–4	6–1	9–10	1–6	—	5–2	2–4	11–8	12–7	3–3	12–7	2–5	8–12
Minnesota	7–0	5–2	13–6	12–7	8–11	3–3	7–12	2–5	—	1–5	4–3	4–3	4–2	3–3	2–5	8–12
New York	9–10	11–8	5–2	2–5	5–2	3–4	4–2	4–2	5–1	—	3–4	5–1	12–7	2–5	6–13	11–9
Oakland	1–6	1–5	2–5	4–3	4–2	9–10	1–5	8–11	3–4	4–3	—	6–13	3–4	10–9	1–5	11–9
Seattle	3–3	3–4	3–4	3–4	3–4	7–12	2–4	7–12	3–4	1–5	13–6	—	4–3	12–7	4–2	8–12
Tampa Bay	9–10	10–9	5–1	2–5	3–3	5–2	1–6	3–3	2–4	7–12	4–3	3–4	—	2–5	10–9	14–6
Texas	6–1	5–2	3–3	3–3	5–2	13–6	4–3	7–12	3–3	5–2	9–10	7–12	5–2	—	2–4	11–9
Toronto	11–8	9–10	3–4	4–3	4–2	3–4	4–3	5–2	5–2	13–6	5–1	2–4	9–10	4–2	—	12–8

=== Detailed records ===
**American League**
Opponent	Home	Away	Total	Pct.	Runs scored	Runs allowed
**AL East**
Baltimore Orioles	3–1	1–2	4–3	.571	45	44
Boston Red Sox	1–2	2–2	3–4	.429	29	44
New York Yankees	2–1	0–3	2–4	.333	23	29
Tampa Bay Rays	4–0	2–1	6–1	.857	44	24
Toronto Blue Jays	2–1	1–3	3–4	.429	33	39
	**12–5**	**6–11**	**18–16**	**.529**	**174**	**180**
**AL Central**
Chicago White Sox	6–3	6–4	12–7	.632	81	74
Cleveland Indians	4–5	6–4	10–9	.526	78	90
Detroit Tigers	6–4	4–5	10–9	.526	107	66
**Kansas City Royals**	–	–	–	–	–	–
Minnesota Twins	5–5	7–2	12–7	.632	74	51
	**21–17**	**23–15**	**44–32**	**.579**	**340**	**281**
**AL West**
Houston Astros	2–1	0–3	2–4	.333	13	22
Los Angeles Angels	3–1	3–0	6–1	.857	42	23
Oakland Athletics	2–1	3–0	5–1	.833	23	18
Seattle Mariners	2–1	2–1	4–2	.667	28	28
Texas Rangers	1–2	2–2	3–4	.429	23	33
	**10–6**	**10–6**	**20–12**	**.625**	**129**	**124**

**National League**
Opponent	Home	Away	Total	Pct.	Runs scored	Runs allowed
Chicago Cubs	0–0	1–2	1–2	.333	9	7
Cincinnati Reds	2–0	2–0	4–0	1.000	17	5
Milwaukee Brewers	2–0	2–0	4–0	1.000	28	11
Pittsburgh Pirates	2–1	0–0	2–1	.667	15	12
St. Louis Cardinals	2–1	0–3	2–4	.333	14	19
	**8–2**	**5–5**	**13–7**	**.650**	**83**	**54**

=== Game log ===
2015 Game Log (95–67)
April: 15–7 (Home: 8–2; Away: 7–5)

#	Date	Opponent	Score	Win	Loss	Save	Attendance	Record
1	April 6	White Sox	10–1	**Ventura** (1–0)	Samardzija (0–1)	—	40,085	1–0
2	April 8	White Sox	7–5	**Davis** (1–0)	Putnam (0–1)	**Holland** (1)	23,385	2–0
3	April 9	White Sox	4–1	**Vólquez** (1–0)	Danks (0–1)	**Holland** (2)	20,236	3–0
4	April 10	@ Angels	4–2	**Vargas** (1–0)	Santiago (0–1)	**Davis** (1)	44,489	4–0
5	April 11	@ Angels	6–4	**Guthrie** (1–0)	Weaver (0–2)	**Holland** (3)	44,154	5–0
6	April 12	@ Angels	9–2	**Ventura** (2–0)	Wilson (1–1)	—	37,060	6–0
7	April 13	@ Twins	12–3	**Duffy** (1–0)	May (0–1)	—	40,123	7–0
8	April 15	@ Twins	1–3	Gibson (1–1)	**Vólquez** (1–1)	Perkins (1)	21,362	7–1
9	April 16	@ Twins	5–8	Milone (2–0)	**Vargas** (1–1)	Perkins (2)	17,449	7–2
10	April 17	Athletics	6–4	**Davis** (2–0)	Otero (0–1)	**Holland** (4)	39,228	8–2
11	April 18	Athletics	0–5	Hahn (1–1)	**Ventura** (2–1)	Chavez (1)	33,151	8–3
12	April 19	Athletics	4–2	**Morales** (1–0)	O'Flaherty (0–1)	**Davis** (2)	36,755	9–3
13	April 20	Twins	7–1	**Vólquez** (2–1)	Gibson (1–2)	—	20,393	10–3
14	April 21	Twins	6–5	**Young** (1–0)	Fien (0–1)	**Davis** (3)	20,990	11–3
15	April 22	Twins	0–3	Pelfrey (1–0)	**Guthrie** (1–1)	Perkins (3)	24,721	11–4
16	April 23	@ White Sox	3–2 (13)	**Morales** (2–0)	Petricka (0–1)	**Davis** (4)	14,218	12–4
—	April 24	@ White Sox	2–2 (8)	***Suspended (rain)** (Resumed: April 26)			20,350	12–4
—	April 25	@ White Sox	**Postponed (rain)** (Rescheduled: July 17)					
17	April 26	@ White Sox	2–3*	Robertson (2–0)	**Herrera** (0–1)	—	20,350	12–5
18	April 26	@ White Sox	3–5	Danks (1–2)	**Vólquez** (2–2)	Robertson (3)	23,317	12–6
19	April 27	@ Indians	6–2	**Vargas** (2–1)	Kluber (0–3)	—	9,668	13–6
20	April 28	@ Indians	11–5	**Finnegan** (1–0)	Atchison (0–1)	—	10,698	14–6
21	April 29	@ Indians	5–7	Salazar (3–0)	**Ventura** (2–2)	Allen (4)	10,284	14–7
22	April 30	Tigers	8–1	**Duffy** (2–0)	Simón (4–1)	—	28,405	15–7

May: 14–12 (Home: 9–5; Away: 5–7)

#	Date	Opponent	Score	Win	Loss	Save	Attendance	Record
23	May 1	Tigers	4–1	**Young** (2–0)	Lobstein (2–2)	**Davis** (5)	38,186	16–7
24	May 2	Tigers	1–2	Price (3–1)	**Vólquez** (2–3)	—	38,692	16–8
25	May 3	Tigers	4–6	Sánchez (2–3)	**Guthrie** (1–2)	Soria (10)	38,326	16–9
26	May 5	Indians	5–3	**Vargas** (3–1)	Salazar (3–1)	**Davis** (6)	29,099	17–9
27	May 6	Indians	3–10	Carrasco (4–2)	**Duffy** (2–1)	—	23,316	17–10
28	May 7	Indians	7–4	**Morales** (3–0)	Kluber (0–5)	**Holland** (5)	38,271	18–10
29	May 8	@ Tigers	5–6	Soria (2–0)	**Pino** (0–1)	—	39,434	18–11
30	May 9	@ Tigers	6–2	**Guthrie** (2–2)	Sánchez (2–4)		41,456	19–11
31	May 10	@ Tigers	2–1	**Frasor** (1–0)	Nesbitt (0–1)	**Holland** (6)	29,852	20–11
32	May 11	@ Rangers	2–8	Lewis (3–2)	**Duffy** (2–2)	—	21,206	20–12
33	May 12	@ Rangers	7–6 (10)	**Holland** (1–0)	Pimentel (0–1)	—	23,659	21–12
34	May 13	@ Rangers	2–5	Gallardo (3–5)	**Ventura** (2–3)	Feliz (6)	26,258	21–13
35	May 14	@ Rangers	6–3	**Guthrie** (3–2)	Detwiler (0–5)	**Holland** (7)	33,818	22–13
36	May 15	Yankees	12–1	**Young** (3–0)	Pineda (5–1)	—	34,584	23–13
37	May 16	Yankees	1–5	Sabathia (2–5)	**Duffy** (2–3)	—	31,871	23–14
38	May 17	Yankees	6–0	**Vólquez** (3–3)	Capuano (0–1)	—	31,251	24–14
39	May 19	Reds	3–0	**Ventura** (3–3)	Cueto (3–4)	**Davis** (7)	29,767	25–14
40	May 20	Reds	7–1	**Guthrie** (4–2)	Marquis (3–4)	—	30,450	26–14
41	May 22	Cardinals	5–0	**Young** (4–0)	Lynn (3–4)	—	37,379	27–14
42	May 23	Cardinals	3–2 (6)	**Vólquez** (4–3)	Lackey (2–3)	—	38,676	28–14
43	May 24	Cardinals	1–6	Wacha (7–0)	**Ventura** (3–4)	—	36,342	28–15
44	May 25	@ Yankees	1–14	Eovaldi (4–1)	**Guthrie** (4–3)	—	36,031	28–16
45	May 26	@ Yankees	1–5	Warren (3–3)	**Vargas** (3–2)	—	33,414	28–17
46	May 27	@ Yankees	2–4	Pineda (6–2)	**Young** (4–1)	Miller (14)	32,734	28–18
47	May 29	@ Cubs	8–4	**Herrera** (1–1)	Strop (1–3)	—	34,273	29–18
	May 30	@ Cubs	Postponed (rain): Makeup date on September 28					
48	May 31	@ Cubs	1–2 (11)	Rosscup (2–1)	Madson (0–1)	—	37,766	29–19

June: 15–11 (Home: 5–5; Away: 7–4)

#	Date	Opponent	Score	Win	Loss	Save	Attendance	Record
49	June 2	Indians	1–2	Carrasco (7–4)	**Davis** (2–1)	Allen (12)	30,361	29–20
50	June 3	Indians	4–2	**Vargas** (4–2)	Kluber (3–6)	**Holland** (8)	29,899	30–20
51	June 4	Indians	2–6 (8)	Bauer (5–2)	**Young** (4–2)	—	29,552	30–21
52	June 5	Rangers	0–4	Gonzalez (2–0)	**Vólquez** (4–4)	—	38,159	30–22
53	June 6	Rangers	2–4	Rodríguez (3–2)	**Ventura** (3–5)	Tolleson (7)	37,924	30–23
54	June 7	Rangers	4–3	**Davis** (3–1)	Kela (4–2)	**Holland** (9)	38,202	31–23
55	June 8	@ Twins	3–1	**Vargas** (5–2)	Hughes (4–6)	**Holland** (10)	22,796	32–23
56	June 9	@ Twins	2–0	**Young** (5–2)	May (4–4)	**Holland** (11)	22,497	33–23
57	June 10	@ Twins	7–2	**Vólquez** (5–4)	Gibson (4–4)	—	28,434	34–23
58	June 12	@ Cardinals	0–4	García (2–3)	**Ventura** (3–6)	—	45,909	34–24
59	June 13	@ Cardinals	3–2	Lyons (1–0)	**Guthrie** (4–4)	Rosenthal (21)	45,981	34–25
-	June 14	@ Cardinals	Postponed (rain): Rescheduled July 23					
60	June 15	@ Brewers	8–5	**Vólquez** (6–4)	Lohse (3–8)	**Davis** (8)	23,007	35–25
61	June 16	@ Brewers	7–2	**Young** (6–2)	Garza (4–8)	–	27,740	36–25
62	June 17	Brewers	10–2	**Blanton** (1–0)	Fiers (3–7)	–	33,420	37–25
63	June 18	Brewers	3–2	**Guthrie** (5–4)	Nelson (3–8)	**Holland** (12)	36,318	38–25
64	June 19	Red Sox	3–7	Rodríguez (3–1)	**Pino** (0–2)	—	38,190	38–26
65	June 20	Red Sox	7–4	**Vólquez** (7–4)	Porcello (4–8)	**Holland** (13)	39,115	39–26
66	June 21	Red Sox	2–13	Miley (7–6)	**Young** (6–3)	—	37,975	39–27
67	June 22	@ Mariners	4–1	**Blanton** (2–0)	Hernández (10–4)	**Holland** (14)	23,588	40–27
68	June 23	@ Mariners	0–7	Montgomery (2–2)	**Guthrie** (5–5)		17,460	40–28
69	June 24	@ Mariners	8–2	**Madson** (1–1)	Elias (4–5)	—	23,392	41–28
70	June 26	@ Athletics	5–2	**Vólquez** (8–4)	Hahn (5–6)	**Holland** (15)	27,365	42–28
71	June 27	@ Athletics	3–2	**Young** (7–3)	Kazmir (4–5)	**Holland** (16)	28,619	43–28
72	June 28	@ Athletics	5–3	**Guthrie** (6–5)	Chavez (4–7)	**Davis** (9)	22,477	44–28
73	June 29	@ Astros	1–6	McCullers (4–2)	**Blanton** (2–1)	–	20,419	44–29
74	June 30	@ Astros	0–4	Keuchel (10–3)	**Duffy** (2–4)	—	24,642	44–30

July: 17–11 (Home: 12–5; Away: 5–6)

#	Date	Opponent	Score	Win	Loss	Save	Attendance	Record
75	July 1	@ Astros	5–6	Gregerson (3–1)	**Herrera** (1–2)	—	25,848	44–31
76	July 2	Twins	0–2	Gibson (6–6)	**Young** (7–4)	Perkins (26)	37,196	44–32
77	July 3	Twins	3–2	**Davis** (4–1)	Thompson (1–3)	—	38,868	45–32
78	July 4	Twins	3–5	Duensing (3–0)	**Blanton** (2–2)	Perkins (27)	37,917	45–33
79	July 5	Twins	3–2	**Holland** (2–0)	Boyer (2–4)	—	29,427	46–33
–	July 6	Rays	Postponed (rain) to July 7 as part of a doubleheader.					
80	July 7	Rays	9–5	**Holland** (3–0)	Boxberger (4–5)	–	22,386	47–33
81	July 7	Rays	7–1	**Finnegan** (2–0)	Gomes (1–4)	–	28,119	48–33
82	July 8	Rays	9–7	**Guthrie** (7–5)	Archer (9–6)	**Holland** (17)	28,204	49–33
83	July 9	Rays	8–3	**Ventura** (4–6)	Karns (4–5)		32,308	50–33
84	July 10	Blue Jays	3–0	**Duffy** (3–4)	Estrada (6–5)	Holland (18)	31,558	51–33
85	July 11	Blue Jays	2–6	Buehrle (10–5)	**Young** (7–5)	—	30,790	51–34
86	July 12	Blue Jays	11–10	**Davis** (5–1)	Schultz (0–1)	**Holland** (19)	31,962	52–34
–	July 14	86th All-Star Game	**AL** 6–3 NL	Price (**AL**, DET)	Kershaw (NL, LAD)	National League vs. American League (Great American Ball Park, Cincinnati)		
87	July 17	@ White Sox	4–2	**Young** (8–5)	Samardzija (6–5)	**Holland** (20)	25,807	53–34
88	July 17	@ White Sox	0–2	Danks (5–8)	**Vólquez** (8–5)	Robertson (20)	25,701	53–35
89	July 18	@ White Sox	7–6 (13)	**Finnegan** (3–0)	Jennings (1–3)	**Madson** (1)	33,559	54–35
90	July 19	@ White Sox	4–1	**Duffy** (4–4)	Sale (8–5)	**Blanton** (1)	32,175	55–35
91	July 20	Pirates	7–10	Burnett (8–3)	**Ventura** (4–7)	Melancon (30)	38,169	55–36
92	July 21	Pirates	3–1	**Davis** (6–1)	Cole (13–4)	**Holland** (21)	38,163	56–36
93	July 22	Pirates	5–1	**Vólquez** (9–5)	Morton (6–4)	—	39,105	57–36
94	July 23	@ Cardinals	3–4	Lackey (9–5)	**Young** (8–6)	Rosenthal (30)	46,003	57–37
95	July 24	Astros	0–4	Kazmir (6–5)	**Guthrie** (7–6)	Gregerson (21)	36,965	57–38
96	July 25	Astros	2–1 (10)	**Herrera** (2–2)	Harris (4–2)	—	38,893	58–38
97	July 26	Astros	5–1	**Ventura** (5–7)	Keuchel (12–5)	—	33,638	59–38
98	July 27	@ Indians	9–4	**Vólquez** (10–5)	Anderson (2–2)	**Blanton** (2)	13,611	60–38
99	July 28	@ Indians	2–1	**Davis** (7–1)	Bauer (8–8)	**Holland** (22)	18,064	61–38
100	July 29	@ Indians	1–12	Kluber (6–11)	**Guthrie** (7–7)	—	19,767	61–39
101	July 30	@ Blue Jays	2–5	Estrada (8–6)	**Duffy** (4–5)	Osuna (6)	30,057	61–40
102	July 31	@ Blue Jays	6–7	Hendriks (3–0)	**Morales** (3–1)	—	29,389	61–41

August: 19–9 (Home: 11–3; Away: 9–6)

#	Date	Opponent	Score	Win	Loss	Save	Attendance	Record
103	August 1	@ Blue Jays	7–6	**Ventura** (6–7)	Lowe (0–2)	**Holland** (23)	37,932	62–41
104	August 2	@ Blue Jays	2–5	Dickey (6–10)	**Vólquez** (10–6)	Osuna (7)	45,736	62–42
105	August 4	@ Tigers	5–1	**Duffy** (5–5)	Verlander (1–4)		35,039	63–42
106	August 5	@ Tigers	1–2	Boyd (1–2)	**Cueto** (7–7)	Wilson (2)	34,628	63–43
107	August 6	@ Tigers	6–8	Wilson (2–3)	**Madson** (1–2)	—	38,919	63–44
108	August 7	White Sox	3–2	**Vólquez** (11–6)	Danks (6–9)	**Holland** (24)	36,211	64–44
109	August 8	White Sox	7–6	**Guthrie** (8–7)	Samardzija (8–7)	**Holland** (25)	39,302	65–44
110	August 9	White Sox	5–4	**Herrera** (3–2)	Petricka (3–3)	**Madson** (2)	35,785	66–44
111	August 10	Tigers	4–0	**Cueto** (8–7)	Boyd (1–3)		36,672	67–44
112	August 11	Tigers	6–1	**Ventura** (7–7)	Sánchez (10–10)	**Hochevar** (1)	34,068	68–44
113	August 12	Tigers	4–7	Feliz (2–3)	**Vólquez** (11–7)	Rondón (2)	30,732	68–45
114	August 13	Angels	6–7	Álvarez (3–3)	**Holland** (3–1)	Street (27)	32,098	68–46
115	August 14	Angels	4–1	**Duffy** (6–5)	Weaver (4–9)	**Holland** (26)	36,926	69–46
116	August 15	Angels	9–4	**Cueto** (9–8)	Shoemaker (5–9)	—	39,251	70–46
117	August 16	Angels	4–3 (10)	**Herrera** (4–2)	Gott (2–1)	—	36,845	71–46
118	August 18	@ Reds	3–1 (13)	**Medlen** (1–0)	Mattheus (1–4)	**Holland** (27)	28,719	72–46
119	August 19	@ Reds	4–3	**Hochevar** (1–0)	Sampson (2–2)	**Davis** (10)	18,078	73–46
120	August 20	@ Red Sox	1–4	Miley (10–9)	**Duffy** (6–6)	Tazawa (2)	35,458	73–47
121	August 21	@ Red Sox	2–7	Owens (2–1)	**Cueto** (9–8)		35,203	73–48
122	August 22	@ Red Sox	6–3	**Ventura** (8–7)	Barnes (3–4)	**Holland** (28)	37,135	74–48
123	August 23	@ Red Sox	8–6	**Young** (9–6)	Tazawa (2–6)	**Davis** (11)	36,151	75–48
124	August 24	Orioles	8–3	**Medlen** (2–0)	Jiménez (9–8)	—	27,797	76–48
125	August 25	Orioles	3–2	**Duffy** (7–6)	González (9–10)	**Davis** (12)	29,734	77–48
126	August 26	Orioles	5–8	Chen (8–6)	**Cueto** (9–9)	Britton (30)	33,003	77–49
127	August 27	Orioles	5–3	**Ventura** (9–7)	Tillman (9–9)	—	31,155	78–49
128	August 28	@ Rays	3–2	**Vólquez** (12–7)	Ramírez (10–5)	**Holland** (29)	13,622	79–49
129	August 29	@ Rays	6–3	**Medlen** (3–0)	Odorizzi (6–7)	**Davis** (13)	24,372	80–49
130	August 30	@ Rays	2–3	Cedeño (3–1)	**Hochevar** (1–1)	Boxberger (32)	18,634	80–50

September: 11–17 (Home: 6–9; Away: 5–8)

#	Date	Opponent	Score	Win	Loss	Save	Attendance	Record
131	September 1	Tigers	5–6	Verlander (3–6)	**Cueto** (9–10)	Rondón (3)	30,665	80–51
132	September 2	Tigers	12–1	**Ventura** (10–7)	Wolf (0–3)	—	26,789	81–51
133	September 3	Tigers	15–7	**Young** (10–6)	Ryan (1–3)	—	29,409	82–51
134	September 4	White Sox	1–12	Danks (7–12)	**Medlen** (3–1)	—	36,953	82–52
135	September 5	White Sox	1–6	Quintana (6–10)	**Duffy** (7–7)	—	37,287	82–53
136	September 6	White Sox	5–7	Johnson (1–0)	**Cueto** (9–11)	—	38,902	82–54
137	September 7	Twins	2–6	Milone (8–4)	**Ventura** (10–8)	—	36,825	82–55
138	September 8	Twins	4–2	**Vólquez** (13–7)	Gibson (9–10)	—	31,834	83–55
139	September 9	Twins	2–3 (12)	Boyer (3–4)	**Morales** (3–2)	Jepsen (12)	32,286	83–56
140	September 11	@ Orioles	8–14	Givens (2–0)	**Herrera** (4–3)	—	45,420	83–57
141	September 12	@ Orioles	14–6	**Ventura** (11–8)	Matusz (1–4)	—	35,439	84–57
142	September 13	@ Orioles	2–8	Chen (9–7)	**Cueto** (9–12)	—	22,496	84–58
143	September 14	@ Indians	3–8	Carrasco (13–10)	**Vólquez** (13–8)	—	10,356	84–59
144	September 15	@ Indians	2–0	**Medlen** (4–1)	Tomlin (5–2)	**Holland** (31)	10,516	85–59
145	September 16	@ Indians	1–5	Salazar (13–8)	**Duffy** (7–8)	—	11,103	85–60
146	September 17	@ Indians	8–4	**Ventura** (12–8)	Kluber (8–14)	**Holland** (32)	13,125	86–60
147	September 18	@ Tigers	4–5 (12)	VerHagen (2–0)	**Holland** (3–2)	—	32,926	86–61
148	September 19	@ Tigers	5–6 (11)	Gorzelanny (2–2)	**Almonte** (0–1)	—	36,007	86–62
149	September 20	@ Tigers	10–3	**Medlen** (5–1)	Simón (13–10)	**Duffy** (1)	32,788	87–62
150	September 22	Mariners	2–11	Iwakuma (9–4)	**Guthrie** (8–8)	—	29,081	87–63
151	September 23	Mariners	4–3 (10)	**Davis** (8–1)	Rollins (0–2)	—	28,756	88–63
152	September 24	Mariners	10–4	**Cueto** (10–12)	Kensing (1–1)	—	32,244	89–63
153	September 25	Indians	0–6	Carrasco (14–11)	**Vólquez** (13–9)	—	37,049	89–64
154	September 26	Indians	5–9	**Medlen** (5–2)	McAllister (4–4)	—	36,167	89–65
155	September 27	Indians	3–0	**Young** (11–6)	Salazar (13–10)	**Davis** (14)	36,339	90–65
156	September 28	@ Cubs	0–1 (11)	Rodney (7–5)	**Almonte** (0–2)	—	40,552	90–66
157	September 29	@ White Sox	2–4	Samardzija (11–13)	**Cueto** (10–13)	Robertson (33)	13,024	90–67
158	September 30	@ White Sox	5–3	**Morales** (4–2)	Robertson (6–5)	**Davis** (15)	12,818	91–67

October: 4–0 (Home: 0–0; Away: 4–0)

#	Date	Opponent	Score	Win	Loss	Save	Attendance	Record
159	October 1	@ White Sox	6–4	**Medlen** (6–2)	Danks (7–15)	**Madson** (3)	12,825	92–67
160	October 2	@ Twins	3–1	**Coleman** (1–0)	Santana (7–5)	**Davis** (16)	31,534	93–67
161	October 3	@ Twins	5–1	**Ventura** (13–8)	Boyer (3–6)	**Davis** (17)	30,181	94–67
162	October 4	@ Twins	6–1	**Cueto** (11–13)	Nolasco (5–2)	—	24,108	95–67

Legend: = Win = Loss = Postponement
Bold = Royals team member

== Post-season ==
=== American League Division Series vs. Houston Astros ===
The Houston Astros defeated the New York Yankees 3–0 in the 2015 American League Wild Card Game on Tuesday, October 6, earning them the right to play the Royals in the ALDS.

==== Game 1, October 8 ====
6:37 p.m. CDT at Kauffman Stadium in Kansas City, Missouri

Team	1	2	3	4	5	6	7	8	9	R	H	E
Houston	2	1	0	0	1	0	0	1	0	5	11	0
Kansas City	0	1	0	1	0	0	0	0	0	2	6	0
WP: Collin McHugh (1–0) LP: Yordano Ventura (0–1) Sv: Luke Gregerson (1); Home runs: HOU: George Springer, Colby Rasmus; KC: Kendrys Morales (2)

Royals Pitchers	IP	H	R	ER	BB	SO	HR	ERA
Yordano Ventura (L, 0–1)	2.0	4	3	3	1	2	0	13.50
Chris Young	4.0	3	1	1	2	7	1	2.25
Kelvin Herrera	1.0	1	0	0	0	2	0	0.00
Ryan Madson	1.0	2	1	1	0	3	1	9.00
Luke Hochevar	1.0	1	0	0	0	0	0	0.00

One season after the Royals blazed through the 2014 ALDS and ALCS with sweeps, they fell to the Astros in their first postseason game of 2015, struggling to manufacture offense against Houston's Collin McHugh. McHugh pitched six innings, holding the Royals to two runs and six hits. The only Kansas City hitter to produce runs was Kendrys Morales, who cracked a pair of solo shots off McHugh in the second and fourth innings. Morales had been the leadoff batter in the second; and in the fourth, the Royals could not put any men on base prior to Morales' second blast. Kansas City's own starter, Yordano Ventura, seemed dazed early, giving up a walk and two hits to the Astros before he recorded the game's first out. Houston then utilized sacrifice ground outs to bring home their first two runs of the game. After surrendering a third run in the second inning, Ventura, having amassed only two innings of work and having struck out two, was replaced by Chris Young following a rain delay. Young would go on to pitch four innings, the most of any Royal in the game. Young put three zeroes on the board against Houston, but the Astros did strike once against him in the fifth, taking a 4–2 lead, as George Springer hit a solo home run to left field. Houston's offense was nightcapped, appropriately, by a Colby Rasmus home run in the eighth; Rasmus had crushed a home run in the wild card game against New York to help the Astros earn a series against the Royals. A loyal crowd in Kansas City tried to unnerve Houston closer Luke Gregerson in the ninth, especially after he hit Mike Moustakas with a pitch, but the final inning was otherwise uneventful, and the Astros sealed their 5–2 Game 1 victory over the Royals with relative ease.

==== Game 2, October 9 ====
2:47 p.m. CDT at Kauffman Stadium in Kansas City, Missouri

Team	1	2	3	4	5	6	7	8	9	R	H	E
Houston	1	2	1	0	0	0	0	0	0	4	8	0
Kansas City	0	1	1	0	0	2	1	0	x	5	11	0
WP: Kelvin Herrera (1–0) LP: Will Harris (0–1) Sv: Wade Davis (1); Home runs: HOU: Colby Rasmus; KC: Salvador Pérez

Royals Pitchers	IP	H	R	ER	BB	SO	HR	ERA
Johnny Cueto	6.0	7	4	4	3	5	1	6.00
Kelvin Herrera (W, 1–0)	1.0	1	0	0	0	1	0	0.00
Ryan Madson	1.0	0	0	0	0	2	0	0.00
Wade Davis (S, 1)	1.0	0	0	0	1	1	0	0.00

The Royals struck back in Game 2 to force a Game 4 in Houston, but it wasn't easy. They again fell behind early as starter Johnny Cueto's struggles continued, Colby Rasmus doubling to bring in George Springer to give the Astros a 1–0 lead. They would pad it in the second with two more runs off of Cueto, courtesy of a Springer line drive that brought home Chris Carter and Jason Castro, who had previously reached on a single and walk, respectively.

The Royals' offense rolled out of bed in the bottom of the second, with Salvador Pérez cracking a solo shot off of Houston's Scott Kazmir. The Astros negated the effect of the Kansas City run in the top of the third as Rasmus homered for his third consecutive postseason game. Kansas City remained resilient, however, with Alex Ríos doubling, Alcides Escobar singling on an overturned video-review call, and Ben Zobrist hitting a sacrifice ground out to bring Rios home. At the end of the third inning, Houston led 4–2. The Astros' scoring for the evening was over.

Neither team posted a run in the fourth or fifth innings, but the Royals hung their first two-spot in the bottom of the sixth. After Lorenzo Cain doubled with one out, Kazmir was relieved by Óliver Pérez, who was shaky, allowing Eric Hosmer to score Cain. Kendrys Morales then singled and Mike Moustakas drew a walk. Josh Fields entered the game as Houston's third pitcher of the inning. Fields walked yet another batter, bringing home the tying run in Hosmer, before ending the inning with two consecutive strikeouts. Kansas City then took the lead in the bottom of the seventh, Escobar tripling and then being brought home by a Zobrist single. Ryan Madson was effective in relief for Kansas City in the eighth. In the ninth, closer Wade Davis struck out Jed Lowrie, but then walked Preston Tucker. Carlos Gomez entered the game as a pinch-runner for Tucker. However, in their second challenge victory of the night, a Davis pickoff throw in which Gomez was originally ruled to be safe was overturned, retiring him for the second out of the inning. Jose Altuve then grounded out to end the game.

==== Game 3, October 11 ====
3:07 p.m. CDT at Minute Maid Park in Houston, Texas

Team	1	2	3	4	5	6	7	8	9	R	H	E
Kansas City	0	0	0	1	0	0	0	0	1	2	7	0
Houston	0	0	0	0	2	1	1	0	x	4	8	1
WP: Dallas Keuchel (1–0) LP: Edinson Vólquez (0–1) Sv: Luke Gregerson (2); Home runs: KC: Lorenzo Cain, Alex Gordon; HOU: Chris Carter

Royals Pitchers	IP	H	R	ER	BB	SO	HR	ERA
Edinson Vólquez (L, 0–1)	5.2	5	3	3	4	8	0	4.76
Danny Duffy	0.2	1	1	1	0	0	1	13.50
Luke Hochevar	1.2	2	0	0	0	2	0	0.00

The Kansas City Royals' Edinson Vólquez pitched valiantly, only allowing three of four runs from Houston's power-hitting lineup, but the Astros surged ahead 2–1 in the series anyway on the back of another strong pitching performance from their own starter, Dallas Keuchel, who struck out seven Royal batters and surrendered only a solo home run, a fourth inning blast off the bat of Lorenzo Cain. Kansas City's only other run would come off of Houston relief pitching. Houston's own offense struck in the bottom of the fifth inning, the Astros posting a two-run frame to negate the Cain blast. Volquez, after striking out Carlos Gómez, walked Luis Valbuena, who was then moved over to third base by virtue of a Chris Carter double. Jason Castro then manufactured a ground ball single to score both Carter and Gomez. The Astros then hung two more runs on the Royals, one each in the sixth and seventh. Alex Gordon homered for Kansas City in the top of the ninth, a solo shot off closer Luke Gregerson, but Gregerson then gathered himself and retired the remainder of the Royals' ninth without suffering any further damage, sealing the Houston victory. The Royals now must win in Game 4 on the road to extend the series, and their season, to a Game 5.

==== Game 4, October 12 ====
October 12, 2015 1:07 p.m. (EDT) at Minute Maid Park in Houston, Texas
Team	1	2	3	4	5	6	7	8	9	R	H	E
Kansas City	0	2	0	0	0	0	0	5	2	9	8	0
Houston	0	1	1	0	1	0	3	0	0	6	9	1
WP: Ryan Madson (1–0) LP: Tony Sipp (0–1) Sv: Wade Davis (2); Home runs: KC: Salvador Pérez (2), Eric Hosmer (1); HOU: Carlos Gómez (1), Carlos Correa 2 (2), Colby Rasmus (3)

Royals Pitchers	IP	H	R	ER	BB	SO	HR	ERA
Yordano Ventura	5	4	3	3	3	8	2	7.71
Kelvin Herrera	1	0	1	1	2	3	0	3.00
Ryan Madson (W, 1–0)	1	4	2	2	0	2	2	9.00
Wade Davis (S, 2)	2	1	0	0	0	3	0	3.00

The Royals' string of clutch hits in the top of the eighth against a frazzled Houston bullpen restored life to a team that had been pushed to the brink of elimination by Astro starter Lance McCullers. Reliever Ryan Madson was credited with the win for Kansas City in spite of giving up back to back home runs in the bottom of the seventh that had a raucous Minute Maid Park crowd thinking that an Astros seat in the ALCS was all but assured. Houston's Will Harris was charged with four earned runs and Tony Sipp with one during Kansas City's eighth inning comeback.

==== Game 5, October 14 ====
October 14, 2015 8:07 p.m. (EDT) at Kauffman Stadium in Kansas City, Missouri
Team	1	2	3	4	5	6	7	8	9	R	H	E
Houston	0	2	0	0	0	0	0	0	0	2	2	0
Kansas City	0	0	0	1	3	0	0	3	x	7	8	0
Starting pitchers: HOU: Collin McHugh; KC: Johnny Cueto; WP: Johnny Cueto (1-0) LP: Collin McHugh (1-1) Sv: Wade Davis (3); Home runs: HOU: Luis Valbuena; KC: Kendrys Morales; Attendance: 40,566

Royals Pitchers	IP	H	R	ER	BB	SO	HR	ERA
Johnny Cueto (W, 1–0)	8	2	2	2	0	8	1	3.86
Wade Davis (S, 3)	1	0	0	0	0	1	0	0.00

=== American League Championship Series vs. Toronto Blue Jays ===
The Blue Jays had defeated the Texas Rangers three games to two in the 2015 American League Division Series.

==== Game 1, October 16 ====
October 16, 2015 7:30 p.m. (CDT) at Kauffman Stadium in Kansas City, Missouri
Team	1	2	3	4	5	6	7	8	9	R	H	E
Toronto	0	0	0	0	0	0	0	0	0	0	3	1
Kansas City	0	0	2	1	0	0	0	2	x	5	8	1
WP: Edinson Vólquez (1–0) LP: Marco Estrada (0–1); Home runs: TOR: None; KC: Salvador Pérez; Attendance: 39,753

Royals Pitchers	IP	H	R	ER	BB	SO	HR	ERA
Edinson Vólquez (W, 1–0)	6.0	2	0	0	4	5	0	0.00
Kelvin Herrera	1.0	0	0	0	0	2	0	0.00
Ryan Madson	1.0	1	0	0	1	0	0	0.00
Luke Hochevar	1.0	0	0	0	0	0	0	0.00

==== Game 2, October 17 ====
October 17, 2015 3:30 p.m. (CDT) at Kauffman Stadium in Kansas City, Missouri
Team	1	2	3	4	5	6	7	8	9	R	H	E
Toronto	0	0	1	0	0	2	0	0	0	3	10	0
Kansas City	0	0	0	0	0	0	5	1	x	6	8	0
WP: Danny Duffy (1–0) LP: David Price (0–1) Sv: Wade Davis (1); Home runs: TOR: None; KC: None; Attendance: 40,357

Royals Pitchers	IP	H	R	ER	BB	SO	HR	ERA
Yordano Ventura (0–1)	5.1	8	3	3	2	6	0	5.06
Luke Hochevar	0.2	0	0	0	0	0	0	0.00
Danny Duffy (W, 1–0)	1.0	0	0	0	0	1	0	0.00
Kelvin Herrera	1.0	1	0	0	0	2	0	0.00
Wade Davis (S, 1)	1.0	0	0	0	1	2	0	0.00

This game marked the fourth time the Royals had rallied back from a multi-run deficit to win in this post-season. With the Royals trailing 3–0, Ben Zobrist led off the seventh inning with a pop-up to shallow right field. Second baseman Ryan Goins had a lead on the ball and waved off charging right fielder José Bautista only to duck out of the way at the last moment, allowing the ball to drop for what was ruled a single. The Royals went on to score five runs in the inning. This marked David Price's seventh consecutive playoff loss, tying him with Randy Johnson for the record.

==== Game 3, October 19 ====
October 19, 2015 7:00 p.m. (CDT) at Rogers Centre in Toronto
Team	1	2	3	4	5	6	7	8	9	R	H	E
Kansas City	1	0	1	0	2	0	0	0	4	8	15	0
Toronto	0	3	6	0	1	0	0	1	x	11	11	0
WP: Marcus Stroman (1–0) LP: Johnny Cueto (0–1); Home runs: KC: Kendrys Morales; TOR: Troy Tulowitzki, Josh Donaldson, Ryan Goins; Attendance: 49,751

Royals Pitchers	IP	H	R	ER	BB	SO	HR	ERA
Johnny Cueto (L, 0–1)	2.0*	6	8	8	4	2	1	36.00
Kris Medlen	5.0	3	2	2	1	6	2	3.60
Franklin Morales	1.0	2	1	1	1	1	0	9.00
* Cueto pitched to five batters in the third.

==== Game 4, October 20 ====
October 20, 2015 3:00 p.m. (CDT) at Rogers Centre in Toronto
Team	1	2	3	4	5	6	7	8	9	R	H	E
Kansas City	4	1	0	0	0	0	4	3	2	14	15	0
Toronto	0	0	2	0	0	0	0	0	0	2	7	0
WP: Luke Hochevar (1–0) LP: R. A. Dickey (0–1); Home runs: KC: Ben Zobrist (1), Alex Ríos (1); TOR: None; Attendance: 49,501

Royals Pitchers	IP	H	R	ER	BB	SO	HR	ERA
Chris Young	4.2	3	2	2	2	4	0	3.86
Luke Hochevar (W, 1–0)	1.1	1	0	0	0	0	0	0.00
Ryan Madson	1.0	1	0	0	0	2	0	0.00
Kelvin Herrera	1.0	1	0	0	0	1	0	0.00
Franklin Morales	1.0	1	0	0	0	1	0	4.50

This game marked the first time in postseason history that a position player was brought in to pitch. Cliff Pennington of the Blue Jays was brought in during the 9th inning as Toronto's bullpen became increasingly thin after the Royals scoring refused to cease after numerous pitching changes. The players in the dugout and the few remaining fans left found this very amusing. Pennington gave up two unearned runs before retiring the side.

==== Game 5, October 21 ====
October 21, 2015 3:00 p.m. (CDT) at Rogers Centre in Toronto
Team	1	2	3	4	5	6	7	8	9	R	H	E
Kansas City	0	0	0	0	0	0	0	1	0	1	4	0
Toronto	0	1	0	0	0	4	1	1	x	7	8	0
WP: Marco Estrada (1–1) LP: Edinson Vólquez (1–1); Home runs: KC: Salvador Pérez (2); TOR: Chris Colabello (1); Attendance: 49,325

Royals Pitchers	IP	H	R	ER	BB	SO	HR	ERA
Edison Volquez (L, 1–1)	5.0	3	5	5	4	2	1	4.09
Kelvin Herrera	1.0	1	0	0	0	3	0	0.00
Danny Duffy	2.0	4	2	2	0	5	0	6.00

==== Game 6, October 23 ====
October 23, 2015 7:07 p.m. (CDT) at Kauffman Stadium in Kansas City, Missouri
Team	1	2	3	4	5	6	7	8	9	R	H	E
Toronto	0	0	0	1	0	0	0	2	0	3	7	0
Kansas City	1	1	0	0	0	0	1	1	x	4	9	0
WP: Wade Davis (1–0) LP: Roberto Osuna (0–1); Home runs: TOR: José Bautista 2 (2); KC: Ben Zobrist (2), Mike Moustakas (1); Attendance: 40,494

Royals Pitchers	IP	H	R	ER	BB	SO	HR	ERA
Yordano Ventura	5.1	4	1	1	2	5	1	3.38
Kelvin Herrera	1.2	0	0	0	0	2	0	0.00
Ryan Madson	0.1	2	2	2	1	1	1	7.71
Wade Davis (W, 1–0)	1.2	1	0	0	1	3	0	0.00

=== World Series vs. New York Mets ===
The New York Mets had defeated the Chicago Cubs four games to zero in the 2015 National League Championship Series.

==== Game 1, October 27 ====
Tuesday, October 27, 2015 7:07 p.m. (CDT) at Kauffman Stadium in Kansas City, Missouri
Team	1	2	3	4	5	6	7	8	9	10	11	12	13	14	R	H	E
New York	0	0	0	1	1	1	0	1	0	0	0	0	0	0	4	11	1
Kansas City	1	0	0	0	0	2	0	0	1	0	0	0	0	1	5	11	1
WP: Chris Young (1–0) LP: Bartolo Colón (0–1); Home runs: NYM: Curtis Granderson (1); KC: Alcides Escobar (1), Alex Gordon (1); Attendance: 40,320

Royals Pitchers	IP	H	R	ER	BB	SO	HR	ERA
Edinson Vólquez	6.0	6	3	3	1	3	1	4.50
Danny Duffy	0.2	0	0	0	0	1	0	0.00
Kelvin Herrera	1.1	3	1	0	0	2	0	0.00
Luke Hochevar	1.0	1	0	0	0	0	0	0.00
Wade Davis	1.0	0	0	0	0	3	0	0.00
Ryan Madson	1.0	1	0	0	1	2	0	0.00
Chris Young (W, 1–0)	3.0	0	0	0	1	4	0	0.00

The ceremonial first pitch was thrown out by George Brett. Matt Harvey started Game 1 for the Mets, while Edinson Vólquez started for the Royals. Volquez's father died earlier in the day. He was not aware of his father's death until after he left the game.

On the first pitch thrown by Harvey, Alcides Escobar hit an inside-the-park home run, the first in a World Series game since Mule Haas in the 1929 World Series (and the first hit by a leadoff batter since Patsy Dougherty did it for the Boston Americans (now Red Sox) in 1903). In the fourth inning, Daniel Murphy recorded the Mets' first hit, and later scored their first run on a hit by Travis d'Arnaud. Curtis Granderson hit a home run in the fifth inning to give the Mets a 2–1 lead. Eric Hosmer reduced the lead to 3–2 with a sacrifice fly, and set a new Royals' postseason run batted in (RBI) record in the process. A single by Mike Moustakas tied the game at three, but in the top of the eighth, Wilmer Flores reached on a fielding error by Hosmer, allowing Juan Lagares to score the go-ahead run and give the Mets a 4–3 lead. Alex Gordon tied the game for the Royals with a home run in the bottom of the ninth inning, as Jeurys Familia blew his first save in six opportunities this postseason.

In the bottom of the 14th inning, Escobar reached first base on a throwing error by David Wright, and Bartolo Colón gave up a base hit to Ben Zobrist, allowing Escobar to reach third base. Hosmer hit a sacrifice fly to Granderson in right field to drive in the winning run. The game ended at 1:18 AM EDT, lasting five hours and nine minutes. The game tied the record for the longest game by innings in World Series history, shared with Game 2 in 1916 and Game 3 in 2005. The loss made Colón the oldest man ever to lose a World Series game.

==== Game 2, October 28 ====
Wednesday, October 28, 2015 7:07 p.m. (CDT) at Kauffman Stadium in Kansas City, Missouri
Team	1	2	3	4	5	6	7	8	9	R	H	E
New York	0	0	0	1	0	0	0	0	0	1	2	1
Kansas City	0	0	0	0	4	0	0	3	x	7	10	0
WP: Johnny Cueto (1–0) LP: Jacob deGrom (0–1); Attendance: 40,410

Royals Pitchers	IP	H	R	ER	BB	SO	HR	ERA
Johnny Cueto (W, 1–0)	9	2	1	1	3	4	0	1.04

In Game 2, Jacob deGrom started for the Mets, and Johnny Cueto started for the Royals. The Mets scored the first run of the game with a Lucas Duda single that scored Murphy in the fourth inning. In the fifth inning, the Royals scored four runs on RBI singles by Alcides Escobar, Eric Hosmer, and Mike Moustakas. The Royals scored three more runs in the eighth inning. Cueto pitched a complete game, the first by an AL pitcher in the World Series since Jack Morris in Game 7 in 1991, as the Royals defeated the Mets and took a two games to zero lead in the series.

==== Game 3, October 30 ====
Friday, October 30, 2015 7:07 p.m. (CDT) at Citi Field in Queens, New York
Team	1	2	3	4	5	6	7	8	9	R	H	E
Kansas City	1	2	0	0	0	0	0	0	0	3	7	0
New York	2	0	2	1	0	4	0	0	x	9	12	0
WP: Noah Syndergaard (1–0) LP: Yordano Ventura (0–1); Home runs: KC: None; NYM: David Wright (1), Curtis Granderson (2); Attendance: 44,781

Royals Pitchers	IP	H	R	ER	BB	SO	HR	ERA
Yordano Ventura (L, 0–1)	3.1	7	5	5	0	1	2	13.50
Danny Duffy	0.2	0	0	0	0	1	0	0.00
Luke Hochevar	1.0	1	0	0	0	2	0	0.00
Franklin Morales	0.1	2	4	2	0	0	0	81.00
Kelvin Herrera	0.2	1	0	0	1	1	0	0.00
Ryan Madson	1.0	1	0	0	1	0	0	0.00
Kris Medlen	1.0	0	0	0	0	2	0	0.00

At Citi Field, Game 3 was started by Yordano Ventura of the Royals and Noah Syndergaard of the Mets. The ceremonial 1st pitch was thrown by Mike Piazza. With no designated hitter (DH) in NL parks, the Mets started Michael Conforto, their DH for Game 2, in the outfield instead of Juan Lagares, and the Royals did not start Kendrys Morales, their regular DH. Ben Zobrist scored the Royals' first run in the first inning on a force play. The first pitch thrown by Syndergaard was over the head of Royals shortstop Alcides Escobar causing the Royals to complain. In the bottom of the first inning, David Wright responded with a two-run home run that also scored Curtis Granderson. For the Royals, Alex Ríos drove Salvador Pérez home in the second inning, and scored on a passed ball by Travis d'Arnaud, giving the Royals a 3–2 lead. Granderson hit a two-run home run in the third inning, and the Mets took a 4–3 lead. The Mets added a run in the fourth inning on an RBI single by Conforto, and four more in the sixth inning. The Royals made a few uncharacteristic mistakes in this game, the first coming in the fourth inning when pitcher Yordano Ventura forgot to cover the base on a ground ball to the first baseman, and the second in the sixth inning when Royals pitcher Franklin Morales triple-clutched Granderson's ground ball, allowing all runners to be safe, which led to a 2-run single by David Wright.

In the 5th inning, Royals player Raúl Adalberto Mondesí made his Major League Baseball debut, pinch hitting for Danny Duffy, becoming the first player to ever make their MLB debut in the World Series.

==== Game 4, October 31 ====
Saturday, October 31, 2015 7:07 p.m. (CDT) at Citi Field in Queens, New York
Team	1	2	3	4	5	6	7	8	9	R	H	E
Kansas City	0	0	0	0	1	1	0	3	0	5	9	0
New York	0	0	2	0	1	0	0	0	0	3	6	1
WP: Ryan Madson (1–0) LP: Tyler Clippard (0–1) Sv: Wade Davis (1); Home runs: KC: None; NYM: Michael Conforto 2 (2); Attendance: 44,815

Royals Pitchers	IP	H	R	ER	BB	SO	HR	ERA
Chris Young	4.0	2	2	2	1	3	1	2.57
Danny Duffy	1.0	2	1	1	0	1	1	3.86
Luke Hochevar	1.0	0	0	0	0	0	0	0.00
Ryan Madson (W, 1–0)	1.0	0	0	0	0	2	0	0.00
Wade Davis (S, 1)	2.0	2	0	0	0	2	0	0.00

The ceremonial first pitch was thrown out by country singer Tim McGraw, son of the late Mets relief pitcher Tug McGraw. The starting pitchers for Game 4 were Chris Young of the Royals and Steven Matz of the Mets. Conforto scored the game's first run with a home run in the third inning, and Wilmer Flores scored later in the inning. Conforto hit another home run in the fifth inning, becoming the first rookie to hit two home runs in a World Series game since Andruw Jones in the 1996 World Series. In the sixth inning, Zobrist hit his eighth double of the postseason, tying a postseason record previously set by Albert Pujols and David Freese of the 2011 St. Louis Cardinals. The Royals took the lead in the eighth inning off of Tyler Clippard and Familia, who had his second blown save of the series.

==== Game 5, November 1 ====
Sunday, November 1, 2015 7:07 p.m. (CST) at Citi Field in Queens, New York
Team	1	2	3	4	5	6	7	8	9	10	11	12	R	H	E
Kansas City	0	0	0	0	0	0	0	0	2	0	0	5	7	10	1
New York	1	0	0	0	0	1	0	0	0	0	0	0	2	4	2
WP: Luke Hochevar (1–0) LP: Addison Reed (0–1); Home runs: KC: None; NYM: Curtis Granderson (3); Attendance: 44,859

Royals Pitchers	IP	H	R	ER	BB	SO	HR	ERA
Edinson Vólquez	6.0	2	2	1	5	5	1	3.00
Kelvin Herrera	3.0	0	0	0	0	3	0	0.00
Luke Hochevar (W, 1–0)	2.0	0	0	0	1	0	0	0.00
Wade Davis	1.0	1	0	0	0	3	0	0.00

Volquez returned to the Dominican Republic for his father's funeral the day after Game 1, but returned to the Royals in time to start Game 5. Harvey started for the Mets. Tony Bennett performed America the Beautiful, and the first pitch was thrown by Cleon Jones, Mookie Wilson, and Darryl Strawberry.

Granderson led off the first inning with a home run for the Mets, and he scored the Mets' second run in the sixth inning. Harvey pitched eight shutout innings for the Mets. It appeared manager Terry Collins would go to Familia, his closer, for the ninth inning, but Harvey convinced Collins to keep him in the game. He then gave up a leadoff walk to Lorenzo Cain in the ninth inning. The Royals scored their first run when Hosmer drove Cain in with a double, prompting Collins to bring in Familia. Hosmer scored the tying run, and Familia blew his third save of the postseason and series; his eight save opportunities tied the postseason record set in 2002 by Robb Nen.

In the top of the twelfth inning, with Addison Reed pitching for the Mets, Pérez hit a single for the Royals. Pinch running for Pérez, Jarrod Dyson stole a base and scored on a single by pinch hitter Christian Colón. After Paulo Orlando, who had substituted into the game earlier, reached base on an error by Daniel Murphy, Alcides Escobar hit a double to score Colón. Ben Zobrist was intentionally walked to load the bases, and Cain drove home three more runs with a double off Bartolo Colón. Davis pitched a shutout inning for the Royals to complete the series and win the championship; he struck out Wilmer Flores looking to end the game, series, and baseball season.

This marked the second consecutive year (and the fourth time in the last six years) that the home team did not win the World Series, thus the trophy presentation was done in the locker room.

=== Postseason game log ===
2015 Kansas City Royals Postseason Game Log (11–5)
AL Division Series vs. Houston Astros (3–2)

#	Date	Opponent	Score	Win	Loss	Save	Attendance	Series
1	October 8	Astros	2–5	McHugh (1–0)	Ventura (0–1)	Gregerson (1)	40,146	0–1
2	October 9	Astros	5–4	Herrera (1–0)	Harris (0–1)	Davis (1)	40,008	1–1
3	October 11	@ Astros	2–4	Keuchel (1–0)	Vólquez (0–1)	Gregerson (2)	42,674	1–2
4	October 12	@ Astros	9–6	Madson (1–0)	Sipp (0–1)	Davis (2)	42,387	2–2
5	October 14	Astros	7–2	Cueto (1–0)	McHugh (1–1)	Davis (3)	40,566	3–2

AL Championship Series vs. Toronto Blue Jays (4–2)

#	Date	Opponent	Score	Win	Loss	Save	Attendance	Series
1	October 16	Blue Jays	5–0	Vólquez (1–0)	Estrada (0–1)		39,753	1–0
2	October 17	Blue Jays	6–3	Duffy (1–0)	Price (0–1)	Davis (1)	40,357	2–0
3	October 19	@ Blue Jays	8–11	Stroman (1–0)	Cueto (0–1)		49,751	2–1
4	October 20	@ Blue Jays	14–2	Hochevar (1–0)	Dickey (0–1)		49,501	3–1
5	October 21	@ Blue Jays	1–7	Estrada (1-1)	Volquez (1-1)		49,325	3–2
6	October 23	Blue Jays	4–3	Davis (1–0)	Osuna (0–1)		40,494	4–2

World Series vs. New York Mets (4–1)

#	Date	Opponent	Score	Win	Loss	Save	Attendance	Series
1	October 27	Mets	5–4 (14)	Young (1–0)	Colón (0–1)		40,320	1–0
2	October 28	Mets	7–1	Cueto (1–0)	deGrom (0–1)		40,410	2–0
3	October 30	@ Mets	3–9	Syndergaard (1–0)	Ventura (0–1)		44,781	2–1
4	October 31	@ Mets	5–3	Madson (1–0)	Clippard (0–1)	Davis (1)	44,815	3–1
5	November 1	@ Mets	7–2 (12)	Hochevar (1–0)	Reed (0–1)		44,859	4–1

=== Postseason rosters ===
Playoff rosters
American League Division Series

- Pitchers: 17 Wade Davis 30 Yordano Ventura 32 Chris Young 36 Edinson Vólquez 39 Kris Medlen 40 Kelvin Herrera 41 Danny Duffy 44 Luke Hochevar 45 Franklin Morales 46 Ryan Madson 47 Johnny Cueto
- Catchers: 9 Drew Butera 13 Salvador Pérez
- Infielders: 2 Alcides Escobar 8 Mike Moustakas 18 Ben Zobrist 24 Christian Colón 35 Eric Hosmer
- Outfielders: 0 Terrance Gore 1 Jarrod Dyson 4 Alex Gordon 6 Lorenzo Cain 15 Alex Ríos 16 Paulo Orlando
- Designated hitters: 25 Kendrys Morales

American League Championship Series

- Pitchers: 17 Wade Davis 30 Yordano Ventura 32 Chris Young 36 Edinson Vólquez 39 Kris Medlen 40 Kelvin Herrera 41 Danny Duffy 44 Luke Hochevar 45 Franklin Morales 46 Ryan Madson 47 Johnny Cueto
- Catchers: 9 Drew Butera 13 Salvador Pérez
- Infielders: 2 Alcides Escobar 8 Mike Moustakas 18 Ben Zobrist 24 Christian Colón 35 Eric Hosmer
- Outfielders: 0 Terrance Gore 1 Jarrod Dyson 4 Alex Gordon 6 Lorenzo Cain 15 Alex Ríos 16 Paulo Orlando
- Designated hitters: 25 Kendrys Morales

World Series

- Pitchers: 17 Wade Davis 30 Yordano Ventura 32 Chris Young 36 Edinson Vólquez 39 Kris Medlen 40 Kelvin Herrera 41 Danny Duffy 44 Luke Hochevar 45 Franklin Morales 46 Ryan Madson 47 Johnny Cueto
- Catchers: 9 Drew Butera 13 Salvador Pérez
- Infielders: 2 Alcides Escobar 8 Mike Moustakas 18 Ben Zobrist 24 Christian Colón 27 Raúl Mondesí 35 Eric Hosmer
- Outfielders: 1 Jarrod Dyson 4 Alex Gordon 6 Lorenzo Cain 15 Alex Ríos 16 Paulo Orlando
- Designated hitters: 25 Kendrys Morales

== Roster ==
2015 Kansas City Royals
Roster
Pitchers: 54 Scott Alexander; 50 Miguel Almonte; 49 Joe Blanton; 62 Aaron Brooks; 62 Joba Chamberlain; 49 Louis Coleman; 47 Johnny Cueto; 17 Wade Davis; 41 Danny Duffy; 27 Brandon Finnegan; 54 Jason Frasor; 11 Jeremy Guthrie; 40 Kelvin Herrera; 44 Luke Hochevar; 56 Greg Holland; 46 Ryan Madson; 48 Michael Mariot; 39 Kris Medlen; 47,45 Franklin Morales; 63 Yohan Pino; 51 Jason Vargas; 30 Yordano Ventura; 36 Edinson Vólquez; 32 Chris Young	Catchers: 9 Drew Butera; 19 Erik Kratz; 26 Francisco Peña; 13 Salvador Pérez; Infielders: 12 Orlando Calixte; 43 Dusty Coleman; 24 Christian Colón; 19 Cheslor Cuthbert; 2 Alcides Escobar; 35 Eric Hosmer; 14 Omar Infante; 8 Mike Moustakas; 18 Ben Zobrist	Outfielders: 6 Lorenzo Cain; 1 Jarrod Dyson; 31 Jonny Gomes; 4 Alex Gordon; 0 Terrance Gore; 16 Paulo Orlando; 15 Alex Ríos; Designated hitters: 25 Kendrys Morales	Manager: 3 Ned Yost; Coaches: 58 Dave Eiland (pitching); 28 Pedro Grifol (catching); 57 Doug Henry (bullpen); 23 Mike Jirschele (third base); 18,81 Rusty Kuntz (first base); 21 Dale Sveum (hitting); 22 Don Wakamatsu (bench)

== Statistics ==
=== Batting ===
Note: G = Games played; AB = At bats; R = Runs scored; H = Hits; 2B = Doubles; 3B = Triples; HR = Home runs; RBI = Runs batted in; BB = Base on balls; SO = Strikeouts; AVG = Batting average; SB = Stolen bases

Player	G	AB	R	H	2B	3B	HR	RBI	BB	SO	AVG	SB
Joe Blanton, P	15	1	0	0	0	0	0	0	0	0	.000	0
Drew Butera, C	45	86	6	17	3	0	1	5	6	24	.198	0
Lorenzo Cain, CF	140	551	101	169	34	6	16	72	37	98	.307	28
Orlando Calixte, SS	2	3	1	0	0	0	0	0	0	0	.000	0
Dusty Coleman, 3B	4	5	5	0	0	0	0	0	0	3	.000	0
Christian Colón, SS, 2B, 3B	43	107	8	31	5	0	0	6	11	17	.290	3
Cheslor Cuthbert, 3B	19	46	6	10	2	1	1	8	4	9	.217	0
Jarrod Dyson, OF	90	200	31	50	8	6	2	18	14	37	.250	26
Alcides Escobar, SS	148	612	76	157	20	5	3	47	26	75	.257	17
Jonny Gomes, RF, DH	12	30	2	5	2	0	0	4	3	14	.167	0
Alex Gordon, LF	104	354	40	96	18	0	13	48	49	92	.271	2
Terrance Gore, OF	9	3	1	0	0	0	0	0	0	1	.000	3
Jeremy Guthrie, P	30	4	0	1	0	0	0	0	0	0	.250	0
Eric Hosmer, 1B	158	599	98	178	33	5	18	93	61	108	.297	7
Omar Infante, 2B	124	440	39	97	23	7	2	44	9	69	.220	2
Erik Kratz, C	4	4	0	0	0	0	0	1	0	2	.000	0
Kris Medlen, P	15	0	1	0	0	0	0	0	0	0	.000	0
Kendrys Morales, DH	158	569	81	165	41	2	22	106	58	103	.290	0
Mike Moustakas, 3B	147	549	73	156	34	1	22	82	43	76	.284	1
Paulo Orlando, RF	86	241	31	60	14	6	7	27	5	53	.249	3
Francisco Peña, C	8	7	0	1	0	0	0	0	0	3	.143	0
Salvador Pérez, C	142	531	52	138	25	0	21	70	13	82	.260	1
Alex Ríos, RF	105	385	40	98	22	2	4	32	15	67	.255	9
Yordano Ventura, P	28	6	0	0	0	0	0	0	0	5	.000	0
Edinson Vólquez, P	34	6	0	0	0	0	0	0	0	4	.000	0
Chris Young, P	34	4	0	2	0	0	0	3	0	1	.500	0
Ben Zobrist, 2B, LF, 3B	59	232	37	66	16	1	7	23	29	30	.284	2
Team totals	162	5575	724	1497	300	42	139	689	383	973	.269	104

=== Pitching ===
Note: W = Wins; L = Losses; ERA = Earned run average; G = Games pitched; GS = Games started; SV = Saves; IP = Innings pitched; H = Hits allowed; R = Runs allowed; ER = Earned runs allowed; HR = Home runs allowed; BB = Walks allowed; K = Strikeouts

Player	W	L	ERA	G	GS	SV	IP	H	R	ER	HR	BB	K
Scott Alexander	0	0	4.50	4	0	0	6.0	5	3	3	0	3	3
Miguel Almonte	0	2	6.23	9	0	0	8.2	7	6	6	4	7	10
Joe Blanton	2	2	3.89	15	4	2	41.2	43	19	18	6	7	40
Aaron Brooks	0	0	6.23	2	0	0	4.1	6	3	3	0	0	3
Joba Chamberlain	0	0	7.94	6	0	0	5.2	6	5	5	1	4	8
Louis Coleman	1	0	0.00	4	0	0	3.0	1	0	0	0	2	1
Johnny Cueto	4	7	4.76	13	13	0	81.1	101	45	43	10	17	56
Wade Davis	8	1	0.94	69	0	17	67.1	33	8	7	3	20	78
Danny Duffy	7	8	4.08	30	24	1	136.2	137	64	62	15	53	102
Brandon Finnegan	3	0	2.96	14	0	0	24.1	16	8	8	3	13	21
Jason Frasor	1	0	1.54	26	0	0	23.1	24	5	4	1	15	18
Jeremy Guthrie	8	8	5.95	30	24	0	148.1	186	101	98	29	44	84
Kelvin Herrera	4	3	2.71	72	0	0	69.2	52	23	21	5	26	64
Luke Hochevar	1	1	3.73	49	0	1	50.2	49	23	21	7	16	49
Greg Holland	3	2	3.83	48	0	32	44.2	39	20	19	2	26	49
Ryan Madson	1	2	2.13	68	0	3	63.1	47	17	15	5	14	58
Michael Mariot	0	0	3.00	2	0	0	3.0	2	1	1	1	2	1
Kris Medlen	6	2	4.01	15	8	0	58.1	56	30	26	6	18	40
Franklin Morales	4	2	3.18	67	0	0	62.1	58	24	22	4	14	41
Yohan Pino	0	2	3.26	7	1	0	19.1	23	8	7	2	3	13
Jason Vargas	5	2	3.98	9	9	0	43.0	46	20	19	5	12	27
Yordano Ventura	13	8	4.08	28	28	0	163.1	154	75	74	14	58	156
Edinson Vólquez	13	9	3.55	34	33	0	200.1	190	89	79	16	72	155
Chris Young	11	6	3.06	34	18	0	123.1	91	44	42	16	43	83
Team totals	95	67	3.73	162	162	56	1452.0	1372	641	601	155	489	1160

== Farm system ==
Level	Team	League	Manager
AAA	Omaha Storm Chasers	Pacific Coast League	Brian Poldberg
AA	Northwest Arkansas Naturals	Texas League	Vance Wilson
A-Advanced	Wilmington Blue Rocks	Carolina League	Brian Buchanan
A	Lexington Legends	South Atlantic League	Omar Ramírez
Rookie	Burlington Royals	Appalachian League	Scott Thorman
Rookie	Idaho Falls Chukars	Pioneer League	Justin Gemoll
Rookie	DSL Royals	Dominican Summer League	José Gualdron

Outfielder José Martínez, while playing for Omaha, broke the Pacific Coast League (PCL) batting record with a .384 average and led the league in on-base percentage (OBP, .461) and was an All-Star.
