= Christian Colón =

Puerto Rican baseball player (born 1989)

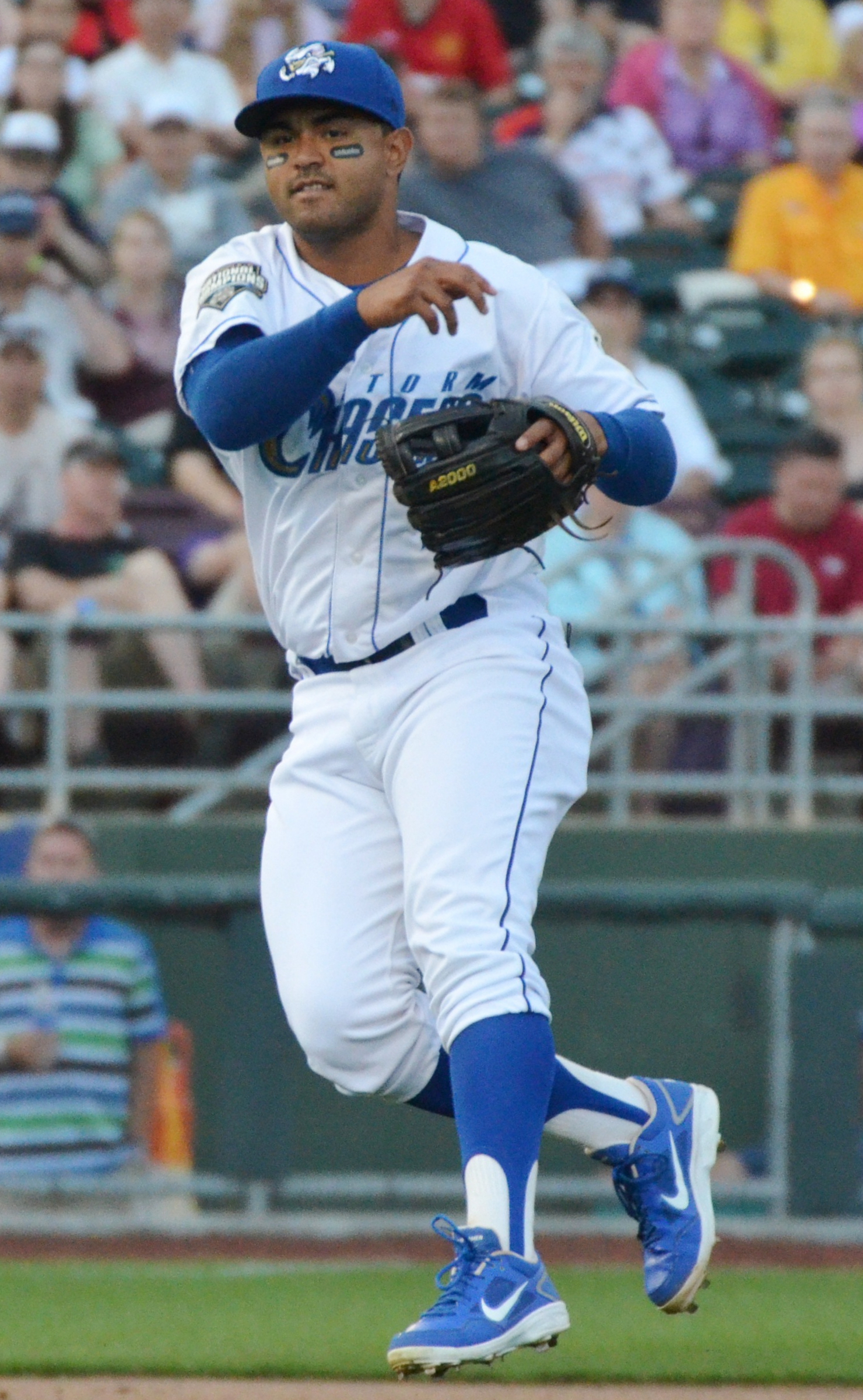
- Colón with the Omaha Storm Chasers in 2014

Kansas City Monarchs
- Infielder / Coach
- Born: May 14, 1989 (age 37); Cayey, Puerto Rico
- Batted: Right Threw: Right

MLB debut
- July 1, 2014, for the Kansas City Royals

Last MLB appearance
- August 12, 2020, for the Cincinnati Reds

MLB statistics
- Batting average: .249
- Home runs: 1
- Runs batted in: 28
- Stats at Baseball Reference

Teams
- Kansas City Royals (2014–2017); Miami Marlins (2017); Cincinnati Reds (2019–2020)

Career highlights and awards
- World Series champion (2015)
Medals
Men's baseball
Representing United States
World Junior Baseball Championship
Silver medal – second place	2006 Sancti Spíritus	Team

Christian Anthony Colón (born May 14, 1989) is a Puerto Rican former professional baseball infielder who currently serves as the hitting coordinator and third base coach for the Kansas City Monarchs of the American Association of Professional Baseball. He played in Major League Baseball (MLB) for the Kansas City Royals, Miami Marlins, and Cincinnati Reds.

== Playing career ==
Colón attended Midway High School in Waco, Texas, as a freshman, and Taylorsville High School in Taylorsville, Utah, for his sophomore season, before his family moved to California. He then attended Canyon High School in Anaheim, California. Colón was drafted in the tenth round of the 2007 MLB draft by the San Diego Padres. He chose instead to attend California State University, Fullerton, where he played college baseball for the Cal State Fullerton Titans baseball team.

=== Kansas City Royals ===
With the Titans, Colón was an All-American shortstop. He was then selected with the fourth overall pick of the 2010 MLB draft by the Kansas City Royals. Colón was added to the 40-man roster on November 20, 2013, in order to be protected from the Rule 5 draft.

Colón batted .296 for the Omaha Storm Chasers of the Triple–A Pacific Coast League in 2014, before he was promoted to the major leagues on June 30. He made 21 appearances for the Royals during his rookie campaign, batting .333/.375/.489 with six RBI and two stolen bases. After entering the 2014 American League Wild Card Game as a pinch hitter, Colón knocked in the tying run on an infield single and scored the winning run on a single by Salvador Pérez.

Colón served as a utility player during the 2015 season, ultimately making 43 appearances for the team, in which he hit .290/.356/.336 with six RBI and three stolen bases. He entered Game 5 of the 2015 World Series (his first appearance in the playoffs) in the top of the 12th as a pinch hitter. After not making a plate appearance for four weeks, Colón hit a single to score Jarrod Dyson for the winning run to clinch the World Series, marking the first time in history that a player in his first at-bat in a World Series delivered the Series-winning run.

Colón made 54 appearances for Kansas City during the 2016 season, slashing .231/.294/.293 with one home run and 13 RBI. In 2017, Raúl A. Mondesí won the Royals' starting second baseman position, and Colón competed with Whit Merrifield for a role on the Opening Day roster. The Royals included Colón on the Opening Day roster, but designated him for assignment on May 10. In seven games for the team, Colón had gone 3-for-17 (.176) with one walk.

=== Miami Marlins ===
On May 16, 2017, the Miami Marlins claimed Colón off of waivers. He was designated for assignment by the team on June 23. Colón spent the remainder of the season with the Triple–A New Orleans Baby Cakes, playing in 49 games and batting .302/.379/.376 with one home run, 13 RBI, and six stolen bases. He elected free agency following the season on November 6.

=== Atlanta Braves ===
On December 6, 2017, Colón signed a minor league deal with the Atlanta Braves. He was released on May 9, 2018.

=== New York Mets ===
On May 18, 2018, Colón signed a minor league contract with the New York Mets. In 82 games for the Triple–A Las Vegas 51s, he hit .304/.396/.459 with 6 home runs, 38 RBI, and 11 stolen bases. Colón elected free agency following the season on November 2.

=== Cincinnati Reds ===
On December 4, 2018, Colón signed a minor league contract with the Cincinnati Reds. On September 16, 2019, the Reds selected Colón's contract, adding him to their active roster. In eight games, he went 3–for–6 (.500) with one RBI. Colón was removed from the 40–man roster and sent outright to the Triple–A Louisville Bats on November 4, after which he subsequently elected free agency.

On November 18, 2019, Colón re-signed with the Reds organization on a new minor league contract. On July 24, 2020, Colón had his contract selected to the 40–man roster. On August 14, Colón was designated for assignment. On August 17, Colón cleared waivers and was outrighted to the Reds alternate training site.

=== Kansas City Monarchs ===
On February 10, 2021, Colón signed with the Kansas City Monarchs of the American Association of Professional Baseball.

=== Toronto Blue Jays ===
On April 24, 2021, Colón signed a minor league contract with the Toronto Blue Jays organization.

On December 5, 2021, Colón announced his retirement from professional baseball.

== Coaching career ==
=== Kansas City Royals ===
On January 4, 2022, Colón was hired to serve as the assistant hitting coach for the Northwest Arkansas Naturals, the Double-A affiliate of his former team, the Kansas City Royals.

=== Seattle Mariners ===
On January 23, 2024, Colón was hired by the Seattle Mariners to serve as the manager for their Double–A affiliate, the Arkansas Travelers. In August, Colón resigned to spend more time with his family and was replaced as manager by Mike Fransoso.

=== Kansas City Monarchs ===
On February 4, 2025, Colón was hired as the hitting coordinator and third base coach for the Kansas City Monarchs of the American Association of Professional Baseball.

== Personal life ==
Colón and his wife, Kayla, have 3 daughters.

== See also ==
- List of Major League Baseball players from Puerto Rico
