= Greg Holland =

American baseball player (born 1985)

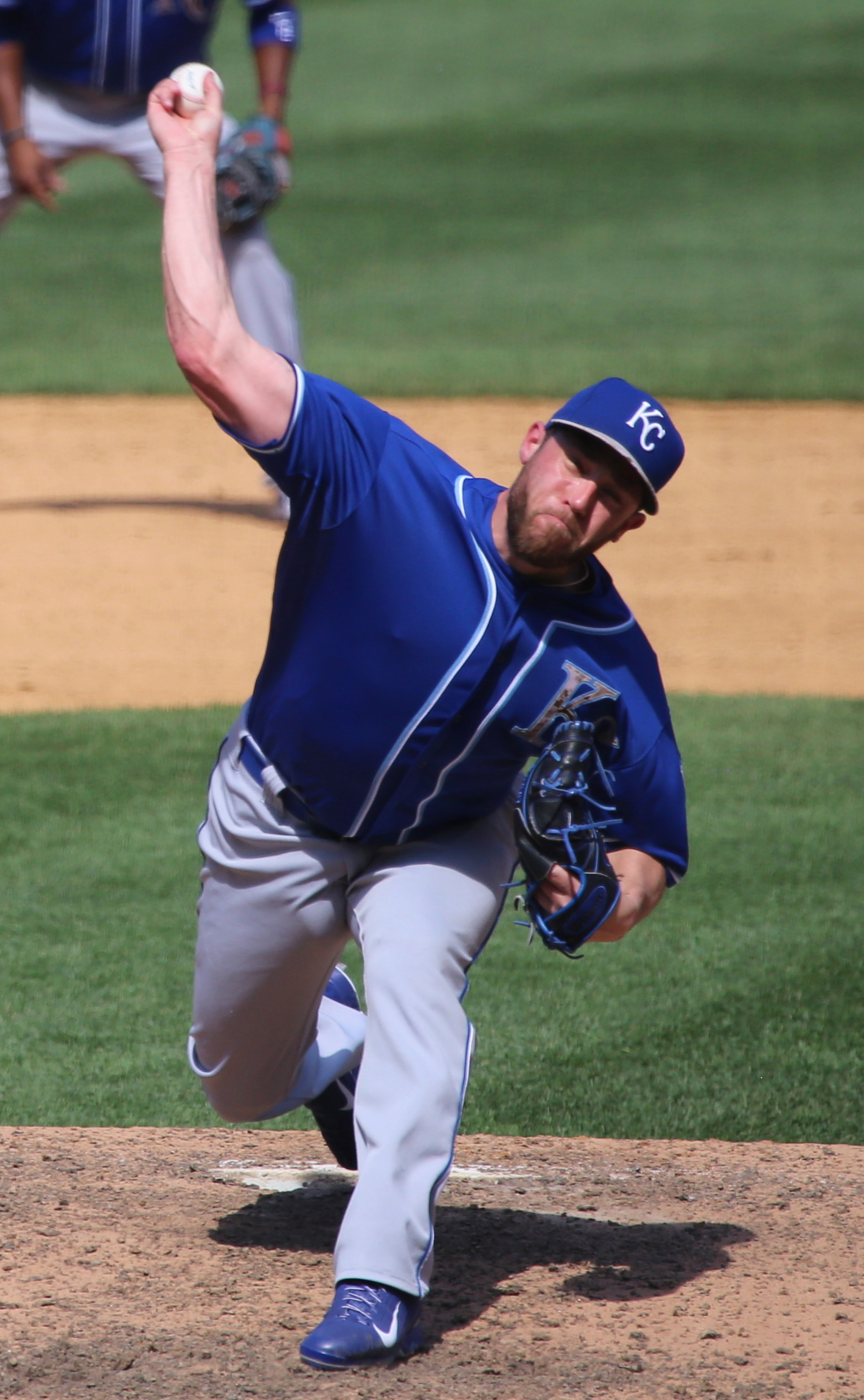
- Holland with the Kansas City Royals in 2015
- Pitcher
- Born: November 20, 1985 (age 40); Marion, North Carolina, U.S.
- Batted: Right Threw: Right

MLB debut
- August 2, 2010, for the Kansas City Royals

Last MLB appearance
- April 16, 2022, for the Texas Rangers

MLB statistics
- Win–loss record: 30–28
- Earned run average: 3.14
- Strikeouts: 677
- Saves: 220
- Stats at Baseball Reference

Teams
- Kansas City Royals (2010–2015); Colorado Rockies (2017); St. Louis Cardinals (2018); Washington Nationals (2018); Arizona Diamondbacks (2019); Kansas City Royals (2020–2021); Texas Rangers (2022)

Career highlights and awards
- 3× All-Star (2013, 2014, 2017); AL Reliever of the Year (2014); NL Comeback Player of the Year (2017); NL saves leader (2017)

Gregory Scott Holland (born November 20, 1985) is an American former professional baseball pitcher. He played in Major League Baseball (MLB) for the Kansas City Royals, Colorado Rockies, St. Louis Cardinals, Washington Nationals, Arizona Diamondbacks, and Texas Rangers. Holland is a three-time All-Star.

After pitching for Western Carolina University, Holland made his MLB debut with the Royals in 2010. He became their closer and made the All-Star Game in 2013 and 2014, and also won the Mariano Rivera Award in 2014. Holland was a member of the 2015 Kansas City Royals team that won the World Series. He missed the 2016 season while recovering from Tommy John surgery, and signed with the Colorado Rockies for the 2017 season. He led the National League in saves with the Rockies, and signed with the Cardinals for the 2018 season.

== Early career ==
Holland attended McDowell High School in Marion, North Carolina, and he played for the school's baseball team as a third baseman. He suffered a broken jaw when he was hit in the face by a ball, requiring his jaw to be wired shut. He lost weight, dropping to about 150 pounds (68 kg), and drew little interest from college baseball programs. He enrolled at Western Carolina University, and walked on to the Catamounts' baseball team as a pitcher. While at Western Carolina, he had a 10–12 win–loss record with a 4.34 earned run average (ERA) from 2005 to 2007.

== Professional career ==
=== Kansas City Royals ===
The Kansas City Royals selected Holland in the 10th round of the 2007 Major League Baseball draft. Holland began his professional career in 2007, making 22 relief appearances for the Idaho Falls Chukars of the Rookie-level Pioneer League, and going 6–1 with a 3.48 ERA, striking out 37 batters in 33 2/3 innings. In 2008, he pitched for the Wilmington Blue Rocks of the Class A-Advanced Carolina League, going 4–5 with a 3.42 ERA in 32 games (seven starts), fanning 96 batters in 84 1/3 innings. He split 2009 between the Northwest Arkansas Naturals of the Class AA Texas League and the Omaha Royals of the Class AAA Pacific Coast League, going a combined 4–3 with a 3.81 ERA in 35 relief appearances.

==== 2010–2013 ====
Holland began the 2010 season with the Omaha Royals, going 3–3 with a 3.81 ERA in 36 relief appearances for them overall. He was promoted to the majors on July 29, 2010, and made 15 relief appearances for the Kansas City Royals, going 0–1 with 23 strikeouts and a 6.75 ERA in 18 2/3 innings.

Holland started the 2011 season in Omaha, but was called up again in May, earning his first major league win in a May 19 game against the Texas Rangers. He pitched in 46 games for the big league club that season, going 5–1 with a 1.80 ERA. He allowed only 37 hits and struck out 74 batters in 60 innings. At the minor league level, he was 2–0 with a 2.08 ERA in 13 relief appearances that season. In 2012, Holland went 7–4 with 16 saves, 91 strikeouts and a 2.96 ERA in 67 relief appearances. He assumed closing duties when Jonathan Broxton, who began the season as the team's closer, was traded to the Cincinnati Reds on July 31. He also pitched in two games at the minor league level that year.

In 2013, Holland became the Royals full-time closer and converted 47 of 50 save opportunities. On September 26, 2013, Holland set the Royals single season saves record with his 46th save in a 3–2 win over the Chicago White Sox. He surpassed Dan Quisenberry and Jeff Montgomery who both had 45 save seasons. His Royals franchise record of 47 saves in a single season still stands as of the 2024 season.

==== 2014–2016 ====
Holland had his second straight All-Star year in 2014, coming one short of his Royals single-season saves record by converting 46 of 48 save opportunities while compiling a 1.44 ERA. He appeared in eight games in the postseason leading up to the Royals World Series appearance, posting a 1.13 ERA over 8 innings and earning 6 saves. He tied a playoff series record by saving 4 games in the ALCS (matching Dennis Eckersley's record in the 1988 ALCS), the first since John Wetteland in the 1996 World Series. On October 22, Holland won the inaugural Mariano Rivera Award for his outstanding performance as a closer. Two days later in Game 3 of the World Series he saved his record-tying seventh game of the postseason, sharing the record with Wetteland, Robb Nen, Troy Percival, Brad Lidge and Koji Uehara.

After serving the bulk of the 2015 season as the Royals' closer, compiling 32 saves with a 3.83 ERA, doctors discovered in late September that Holland had a "significant tear" in his right ulnar collateral ligament. On September 22, the Royals announced that Holland's season was over, and that he would likely require Tommy John surgery. On September 29, the team confirmed that Holland was scheduled to undergo the surgery on October 2, and that he would likely miss most, if not all, of the 2016 season. With the Royals finishing the season 95–67, the team won the 2015 World Series against the New York Mets, their first title in 30 years.

After the 2015 season, Holland was granted free agency. Holland missed the entire 2016 season as he continued to recover from Tommy John surgery.

=== Colorado Rockies ===
On January 26, 2017, Holland signed a one-year contract with the Colorado Rockies. On April 3, he earned his first save since September 17, 2015, defeating the Milwaukee Brewers on his Rockies debut and Opening Day. Holland won the National League Reliever of the Month Award for April.

On Mother's Day, Holland broke the Rockies franchise record of converting 16 consecutive saves to start a season, formerly held by José Jiménez, which he had set in 2002. Holland won his second consecutive NL Reliever of the Month Award for the month of May, going for 20-for-20 in save opportunities, a 1.31 ERA and 0.82 WHIP through May. He was selected to his third All-Star Game, played at Marlins Park in Miami. At that point, he saved an MLB-best 28 of 29 chances with a 1.62 ERA and opponents batted .162/.264/.259. He slumped in August, allowing 14 earned runs in 9 1/3 innings. At the season's end, Holland had tied the Rockies franchise record for saves in one season while tying for the National League lead with Los Angeles Dodgers' Kenley Jansen. Holland's ERA was 3.61, and he qualified for enough incentives to increase his salary from the base $9 million to $15 million. Having a player option for 2018, he chose not to exercise it, making him a free agent. He won the NL Comeback Player of the Year Award.

=== St. Louis Cardinals ===
Holland signed a one-year, $14 million, contract with the St. Louis Cardinals on March 31, 2018. The Cardinals assigned him to the Palm Beach Cardinals of the Class A-Advanced Florida State League to ensure his conditioning before promoting him to the major leagues. In his major league debut with the club versus the Milwaukee Brewers on April 10, he appeared in the tenth inning and walked four batters, including walking a run to Orlando Arcia, which led to a 5−4 loss. On May 26, 2018, after putting up a 9.45 ERA for the 2018 season, the Cardinals put Holland on the 10-day disabled list with a hip impingement.

After compiling a 7.92 ERA and a 2.24 WHIP in 25 relief innings pitched, Holland was designated for assignment on July 27. He was released on August 1, 2018.

=== Washington Nationals ===
On August 7, 2018, he signed a contract with the Washington Nationals. He greatly improved from his time in St. Louis, pitching 21 1/3 innings with 25 strikeouts, 10 walks, and a 0.84 ERA.

=== Arizona Diamondbacks ===
On January 31, 2019, Holland signed a one-year, $3.5 million deal with the Arizona Diamondbacks. The deal also includes an additional $3.5 million in incentive bonuses.

Initially, Holland performed well for the Diamondbacks as their closer, posting a 1.37 ERA in his first 20 games. His season soon unraveled; in his next 20 games, he posted an 8.44 ERA, and blew several save opportunities. Memorably, on July 2, Holland entered in the bottom of the ninth at Dodger Stadium with the Diamondbacks holding a 4–3 lead. He successfully recorded two outs, but then proceeded to walk four Dodgers in a row, tying the game. With the bases still loaded, Holland was replaced on the mound by T. J. McFarland, who promptly walked Cody Bellinger he faced to lose the game.

On July 26, Holland entered to pitch the bottom of the ninth at Marlins Park with a 2–1 Diamondbacks lead. He allowed a leadoff double to Garrett Cooper, walked Neil Walker, and gave up a single to Starlin Castro which loaded the bases with nobody out. Jorge Alfaro hit a sacrifice fly to tie the game for the Marlins, and Holland was replaced with Yoshihisa Hirano, who allowed a walk-off sacrifice fly to Harold Ramírez. Following the blown save, manager Torey Lovullo announced Holland would no longer serve as the Diamondbacks' closer. The Diamondbacks eventually designated Holland for assignment on August 7, 2019. He was released on August 10.

=== Washington Nationals (second stint) ===
On August 13, 2019, Holland signed a minor league contract with the Washington Nationals and was assigned to the Double–A Harrisburg Senators. He made 8 scoreless appearances for the Senators, striking out 9 batters in 9 innings. Holland elected free agency following the season on November 4.

=== Kansas City Royals (second stint) ===
Holland signed a minor league deal with the Royals on January 29, 2020. He made the Opening Day roster, and had his contract selected on July 23. With the 2020 Kansas City Royals, Holland appeared in 28 games, compiling a 3–0 record with 1.91 ERA and 31 strikeouts in 28 1/3 innings pitched. On December 14, 2020, Holland re-signed with the Royals on a one-year $2.75MM deal.

=== Texas Rangers ===
On March 16, 2022, Holland signed a minor league contract with an invitation to major league spring training with the Texas Rangers. On April 6, it was announced that Holland had made the Rangers’ Opening Day roster.

He was designated for assignment on April 19, 2022. On April 22, Holland elected free agency. Holland's departure from the Rangers came shortly after he accrued ten years of major league service time.

== Pitching report ==
With an overhand delivery, Holland throws a four-seam fastball that is regularly clocked at 95-96 mph, topping out at 100 mph. He pairs his fastball with a slider around 86 mph, and a rare splitter around 85-89 mph.

== Personal life ==
He is the son of Scott and Kim Holland. He has a brother, Chase Holland, and a sister, Ashley Holland Berryhill. He is married to Lacey. Their first child was born on October 1, 2014. Their second child was born on July 27, 2017.
