= Dusty Coleman =

American baseball infielder (born 1987)

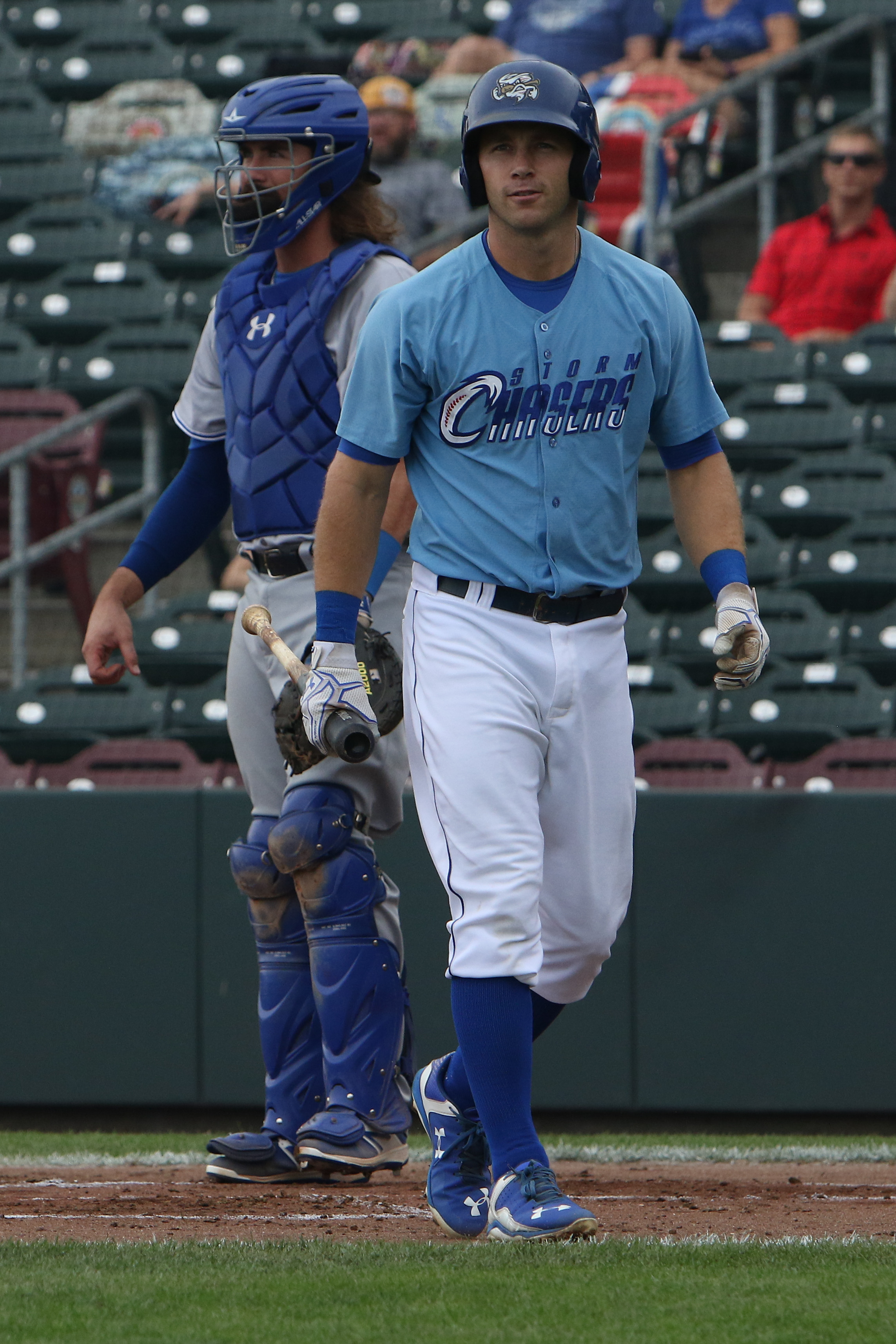
- Coleman with the Omaha Storm Chasers in 2016
- Infielder
- Born: April 20, 1987 (age 38); Sioux Falls, South Dakota, U.S.
- Batted: Right Threw: Right

MLB debut
- July 3, 2015, for the Kansas City Royals

Last MLB appearance
- August 27, 2017, for the San Diego Padres

MLB statistics
- Batting average: .211
- Home runs: 4
- Runs batted in: 9
- Stats at Baseball Reference

Teams
- Kansas City Royals (2015); San Diego Padres (2017)
Medals
Men's baseball
Representing United States
Pan American Games
Silver medal – second place	2015 Toronto	Team

Dustin Michael Coleman (born April 20, 1987) is an American former professional baseball infielder. He played in Major League Baseball (MLB) for the Kansas City Royals and San Diego Padres.

== Amateur career ==
Born in Sioux Falls, South Dakota, Coleman attended O'Gorman Catholic High School in Sioux Falls, where he played for the school's baseball team. He was named an all-state shortstop his junior and senior seasons, and went on to play baseball at Wichita State University. In 2008, he played collegiate summer baseball in the Cape Cod Baseball League for the Bourne Braves, and was named a league all-star. He was drafted by the Oakland Athletics in the 28th round of the 2008 Major League Baseball draft.

== Professional career ==
=== Oakland Athletics ===
In 2014, playing for the Double-A Midland RockHounds, Coleman batted .223/.300/.397 with 18 home runs, and led all minor leaguers with 500 or more plate appearances with a strikeout percentage of 36.5%.

=== Kansas City Royals ===
On January 16, 2015, Coleman signed a minor league contract with the Kansas City Royals organization. He was assigned to the Double–A Northwest Arkansas Naturals to begin the year. On July 3, Coleman was selected to the 40-man roster and promoted to the major leagues for the first time. He appeared in four games for the Royals, and was designated for assignment on September 7. Coleman spent the remainder of the year with the Triple–A Omaha Storm Chasers, and elected free agency following the season on November 6.

On November 9, 2015, Coleman re–signed with the Royals on a minor league contract. In 63 games split between Omaha and the rookie–level Arizona League Royals, he batted .244/.302/.418 with six home runs, 26 RBI, and eight stolen bases. Coleman elected free agency following the season on November 7, 2016.

=== San Diego Padres ===
On December 5, 2016, Coleman signed a minor league contract with the San Diego Padres. He appeared in 27 games for the Padres in 2017, hitting .227/.268/.455 with four home runs, nine RBI, and one stolen base. On September 18, 2017, Coleman was designated for assignment by the Padres. He cleared waivers and was sent outright to the Triple-A El Paso Chihuahuas on September 21. Comeman elected free agency on October 2.

On November 16, 2017, Coleman re-signed with the Padres on a minor league contract. In 103 games for the Triple-A El Paso Chihuahuas, he batted .202/.268/.397 with 13 home runs and 36 RBI. Coleman elected free agency following the season on November 2, 2018.
