= Jarrod Dyson =

American baseball player (born 1984)

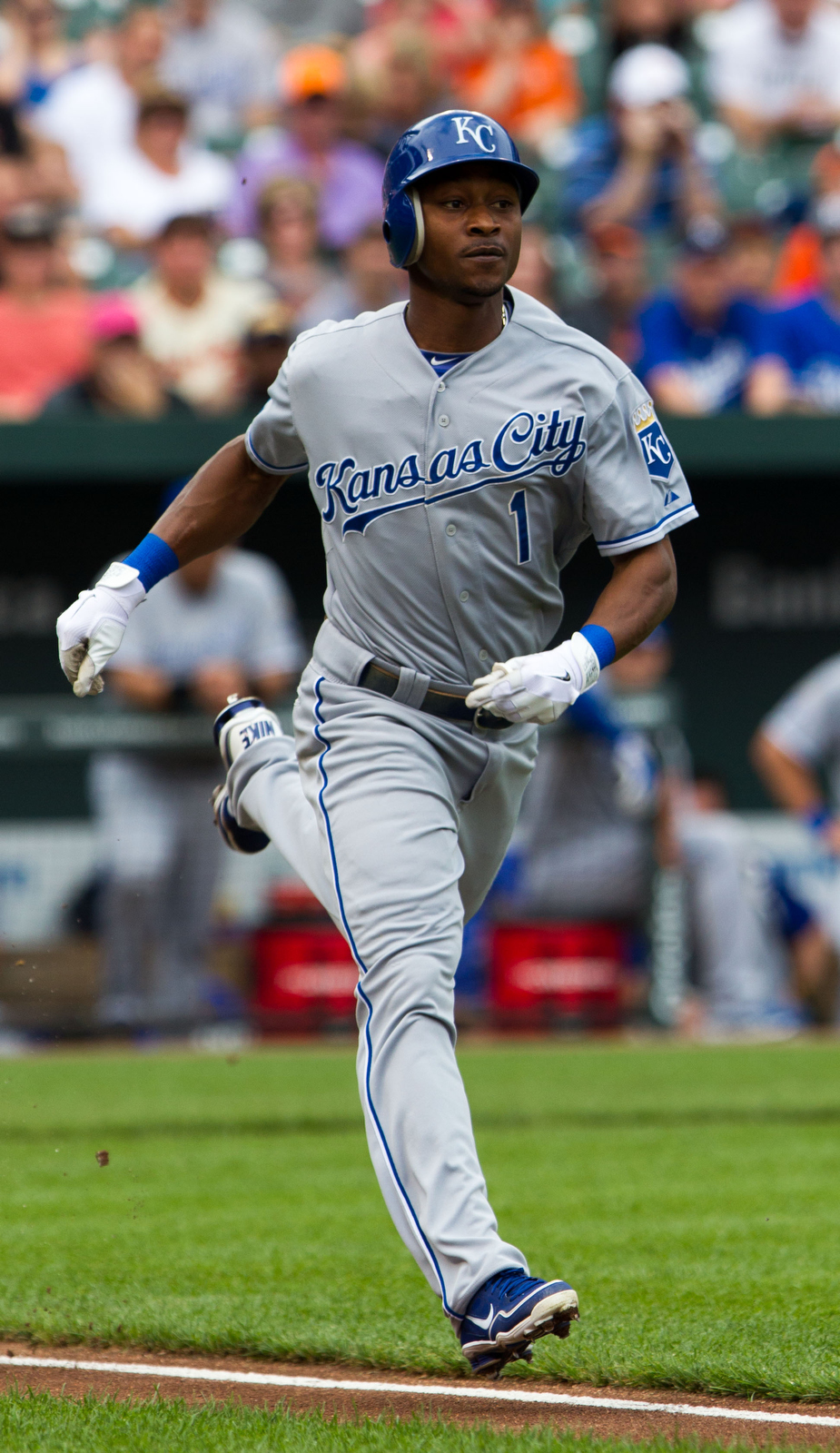
- Dyson with the Kansas City Royals in 2012
- Outfielder
- Born: August 15, 1984 (age 42); McComb, Mississippi, U.S.
- Batted: Left Threw: Right

MLB debut
- September 7, 2010, for the Kansas City Royals

Last MLB appearance
- October 2, 2021, for the Toronto Blue Jays

MLB statistics
- Batting average: .244
- Home runs: 21
- Runs batted in: 185
- Stolen bases: 266
- Stats at Baseball Reference

Teams
- Kansas City Royals (2010–2016); Seattle Mariners (2017); Arizona Diamondbacks (2018–2019); Pittsburgh Pirates (2020); Chicago White Sox (2020); Kansas City Royals (2021); Toronto Blue Jays (2021)

Career highlights and awards
- World Series champion (2015)

Jarrod Martel Dyson (juh-ROD; born August 15, 1984) is an American former professional baseball center fielder. He has played in Major League Baseball (MLB) from 2010 to 2021 for the Kansas City Royals, Seattle Mariners, Arizona Diamondbacks, Pittsburgh Pirates, Chicago White Sox, and Toronto Blue Jays.

Dyson was drafted by the Royals in the 50th round of the 2006 Major League Baseball draft out of Southwest Mississippi Community College. He made his MLB debut on September 7, 2010. He won the 2015 World Series with the Royals. Kansas City traded him to the Mariners before the 2017 season. He signed his first free agent contract with Arizona after that season, playing in a career-high 130 games in 2019. He played with four teams, including returning to the Royals, in his final two seasons in the majors. Dyson was successful at stealing bases, stealing at least 30 bases in 5 MLB seasons, but hit 21 home runs over 12 seasons.

== Amateur career ==
Born and raised in McComb, Mississippi, Dyson attended McComb High School, where he starred in baseball and football as a running back. At McComb, Dyson earned All-Division honors but was passed over by most scouts due to his slight stature. He later attended Southwest Mississippi Community College. At Southwest, Dyson tied the single-season record with seven triples and set a record with 47 runs.

== Professional career ==
=== Kansas City Royals ===
==== Draft and minors ====
Dyson was drafted by the Royals in the 50th round, 1,475th overall, of the 2006 amateur draft. He signed for $5,000 began his professional career that summer with the AZL Royals, hitting .273 with no home runs and 19 stolen bases in 51 games. He played in 10 games in 2007, all for the Burlington Bees, hitting .270.

He spent 2008 with the Wilmington Blue Rocks, hitting .260 with 39 stolen bases in 93 games. He was suspended for 50 games in February 2009 after testing positive for an amphetamine. He split the season between the Bees (17 games) and Northwest Arkansas Naturals (63 games), hitting a combined .276 with 46 stolen bases. He began 2010 in the minors, splitting the season between the AZL Royals, Blue Rocks, Naturals and Omaha Royals. He hit .299 with 24 stolen bases in 71 games.

==== 2010 ====
Dyson was first called up to the major leagues in September 2010, joining the Royals and playing time in center field. He played in 18 games and hit .211/.286/.404 with nine stolen bases in 57 at-bats.

==== 2011 ====
Dyson made the team out of spring training in 2011, and took on the role of a pinch running specialist. He was regarded as one of the faster outfielders in the game.

With Melky Cabrera having a breakout season in center field, Dyson spent the majority of the season in Triple-A. When in the major leagues, he served as a late-inning pinch runner for Billy Butler and Brayan Peña. Dyson hit .205/.308/.227 in 44 at-bats, stealing 11 bases. In the minors, he hit .279 with 38 stolen bases in 83 games.

==== 2012 ====
The Royals originally had Lorenzo Cain as their starting center fielder, however Dyson gained significant playing time as a result of Cain's injuries.

In 102 games, Dyson finished the season with 76 hits in 292 at-bats leading to a .260 batting average. He also had nine RBI, eight doubles, five triples, 30 walks, 52 runs scored, and 30 stolen bases, further highlighting his speed and baserunning talent. He spent 15 games with the Triple-A Omaha Storm Chasers that year as well, hitting .333 with seven stolen bases.

==== 2013 ====
In 2013, Dyson set a new career best with 34 steals and had a slash line of .258/.326/.366.

==== 2014 ====
In spring training in 2014, Dyson tied for the major league lead in stolen bases with 10, while not being caught once. He finished the regular season tied for third in the American League with 36 steals. He was often used as a late inning pinch runner and defensive substitute, taking over in center field while Cain would shift to right field taking the place of Norichika Aoki. He played in a then-career-high 120 games and had career highs in batting average (.269) and RBIs (24) at the time. His .269 batting average stands as his second-best total in a year.

==== 2015 ====
On January 28, 2015, the Kansas City Royals and Dyson avoided arbitration by agreeing to a one-year contract for $1.225 million. Dyson, who was expected to be the Royals' fourth outfielder, could also make $25,000 for reaching 350 plate appearances and $50,000 if he was chosen for the All-Star Game. He batted a slash line of .250/.311/.380.

Dyson played an important role in the 2015 World Series against the New York Mets. The Royals were up 3 games to 1 in the fifth game of the World Series. In the 12th Inning, the Royals and Mets were tied at two runs each. After a single to right field, Dyson, known for his speed, pinch ran for Salvador Perez. Dyson proceeded to steal second base. When Alex Gordon grounded out to first, Dyson advanced to third base. Then, Christian Colón singled to left allowing Dyson to score, giving the Royals their first lead of the game. The Royals would finish the inning with a total of five runs, winning the game 7–2 and becoming the World Series champions.

==== 2016 ====
Prior to the start of the 2016 season, Dyson and Paulo Orlando were considered most likely to platoon in right field, though the Royals announced plans for an open competition in spring training. On July 18, Dyson hit a grand slam against the Cleveland Indians. It was the first of his career. That year, he played in 107 games with 83 hits across 299 at-bats. Of those, 14 were doubles and 8 were triples, each being the highest totals of his career in a year. He batted a slash line of .278/.340/.388 and stole 30 bases.

=== Seattle Mariners ===
On January 6, 2017, Dyson was traded to the Seattle Mariners for pitcher Nate Karns.

On May 16, he was hit by a pitch three times, tied with many others for the most in an MLB game.

On September 11, it was announced that Dyson would undergo pelvic surgery, ending his season. In 111 games of 2017, Dyson finished with 28 stolen bases, a .251 batting average, 5 home runs, and 30 RBI.

=== Arizona Diamondbacks ===
==== 2018 ====
On February 19, 2018, the Arizona Diamondbacks signed Dyson to a two-years, $7.5 million contract. His first season with Arizona proved difficult, as he had multiple stints on the disabled list and hit a career-low .189 with a .282 OBP and a .257 slugging percentage in 67 games. He was ruled out for the season on September 6.

==== 2019 ====
In 2019 he batted .230/.313/.320 in a career-high 400 at-bats.

=== Pittsburgh Pirates ===
On February 13, 2020, Dyson signed a one-year, $2 million contract with the Pittsburgh Pirates.

=== Chicago White Sox ===
On August 28, 2020, Dyson was traded to the Chicago White Sox in exchange for international signing bonus pool money.

In the 2020 season, between the two teams Dyson batted .180/.231/.180 with no home runs and five RBIs in 61 at bats.

=== Kansas City Royals (second stint) ===
On March 2, 2021, Dyson signed a one-year, $1.5 million contract with the Kansas City Royals. He played in 77 games for the Royals, hitting .221 with no home runs, 10 RBI, and 8 steals.

=== Toronto Blue Jays ===
On August 27, 2021, Dyson was claimed off of waivers by the Toronto Blue Jays. In 25 appearances for Toronto, he went 1-for-13 (.077) with two stolen bases. Dyson became a free agent following the season.

== Personal life ==
Dyson has three older brothers, one younger brother and a younger sister, and was raised by his mother. The family lived in public housing until he was eight years old. Dyson has a son.

Dyson had the names of deceased family members stitches onto his fielding glove while playing with Arizona.

In January 2016, the city of McComb, Mississippi, announced it was renaming one of its streets Dyson Drive to honor him.
