= Yohan Pino =

Venezuelan baseball player (born 1983)

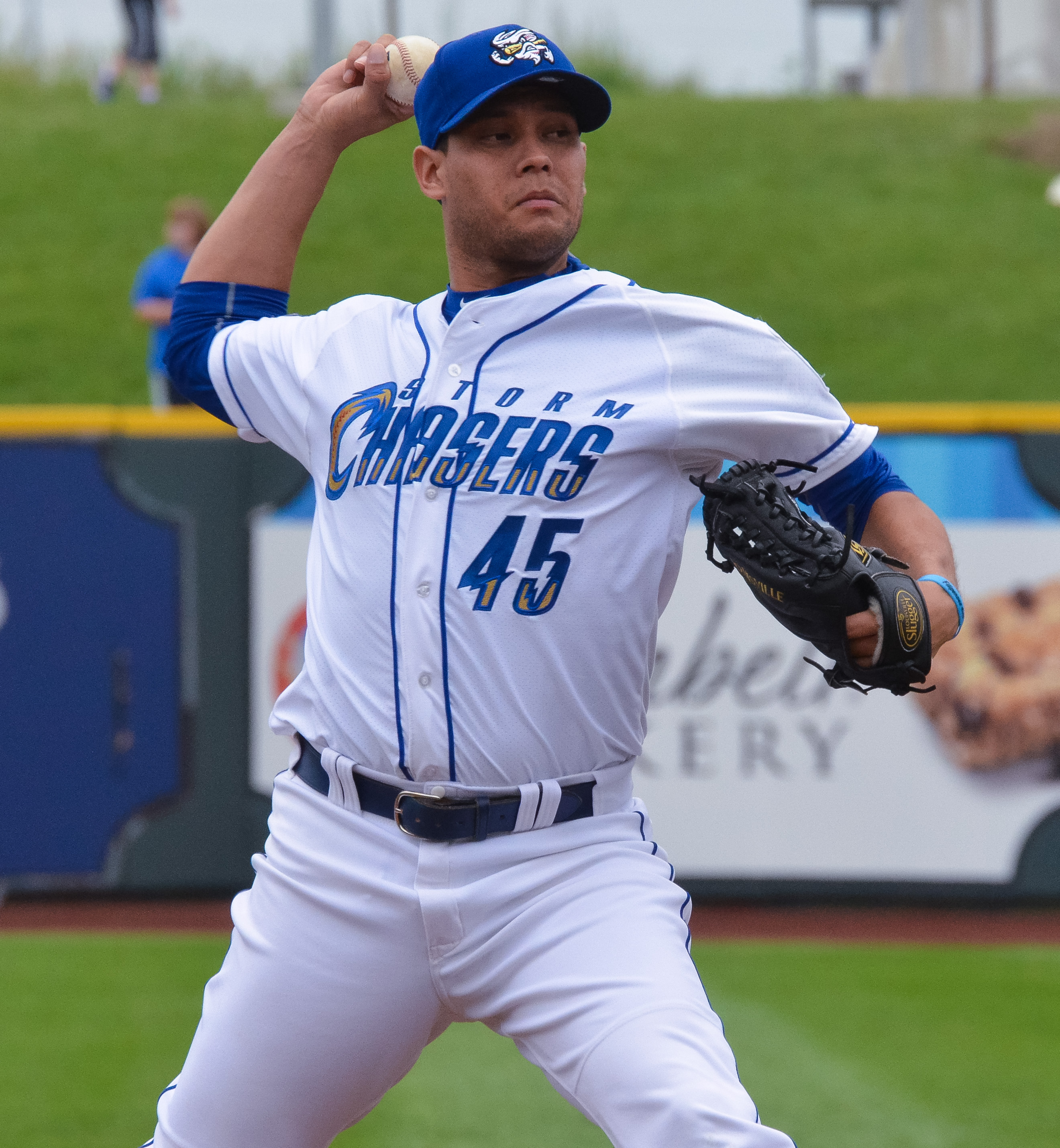
- Pino pitching for the Omaha Storm Chasers in 2015
- Pitcher
- Born: December 26, 1983 (age 42); Turmero, Aragua, Venezuela
- Batted: Right Threw: Right

Professional debut
- MLB: June 26, 2014, for the Minnesota Twins
- KBO: April 3, 2016, for the KT Wiz

Last appearance
- MLB: June 19, 2015, for the Kansas City Royals
- KBO: July 21, 2016, for the KT Wiz

MLB statistics
- Win–loss record: 2–7
- Earned run average: 4.63
- Strikeouts: 63

KBO statistics
- Win–loss record: 2–3
- Earned run average: 7.15
- Strikeouts: 23
- Stats at Baseball Reference

Teams
- Minnesota Twins (2014); Kansas City Royals (2015); KT Wiz (2016)

Yohan Jose Alana Pino (born December 26, 1983) is a Venezuelan-Colombian former professional baseball pitcher. He played in Major League Baseball (MLB) for the Minnesota Twins and Kansas City Royals, and in the KBO League for the KT Wiz.

== Playing career ==
=== Minnesota Twins ===
Pino played in the minor leagues for the Minnesota Twins, Cleveland Indians, Toronto Blue Jays and Cincinnati Reds organizations.

Pino signed with the Twins before the 2014 season. He made his major league debut on June 19, 2014. At 30 years, 175 days, Pino is the oldest Twins starting pitcher to make his major league debut. Pino was optioned back to the Triple-A Rochester Red Wings on August 15, 2014, after making 10 starts and going 1–5 with a 5.37 ERA. On October 13, Pino was outrighted off the Twins roster. He elected free agency on November 3.

=== Kansas City Royals ===
On December 15, 2024, Pino signed a major league deal with the Kansas City Royals. On April 18, 2015, the same day he was called up from Triple-A, he made his Royals debut, replacing starter Yordano Ventura after the latter was ejected in the fourth inning. He was optioned back to the minors on May 12, after he blew a hold opportunity on May 9 with a throwing error in the bottom of the ninth against the Detroit Tigers. On September 7, Pino was designated for assignment. He cleared waivers and was sent outright to Triple-A Omaha Storm Chasers on September 10. He elected free agency on October 5.

=== KT Wiz ===
On December 16, 2015, Pino signed with the KT Wiz of the KBO League. He was released on July 28.

=== Minnesota Twins (second stint) ===
On January 24, 2017, Pino signed a minor league contract with the Minnesota Twins. In 13 games split between the Double–A Chattanooga Lookouts and Triple–A Rochester Red Wings, he recorded a 4.50 ERA with 33 strikeouts in 42 innings. Pino elected free agency following the season on November 6.

=== Tommasin Padova ===
On January 25, 2018, Pino signed with the Tommasin Padova of the Italian Baseball League. In 14 games (13 starts) for the club, Pino logged a 5–5 record and 3.51 ERA with 80 strikeouts across 82 innings pitched.

== Coaching career ==
On January 15, 2024, Pino was named as the pitching coach for the Miami Marlins' DSL affiliate, the Dominican Summer League Marlins.

== See also ==
- List of Major League Baseball players from Venezuela
