= Miguel Almonte =

Dominican baseball player (born 1993)

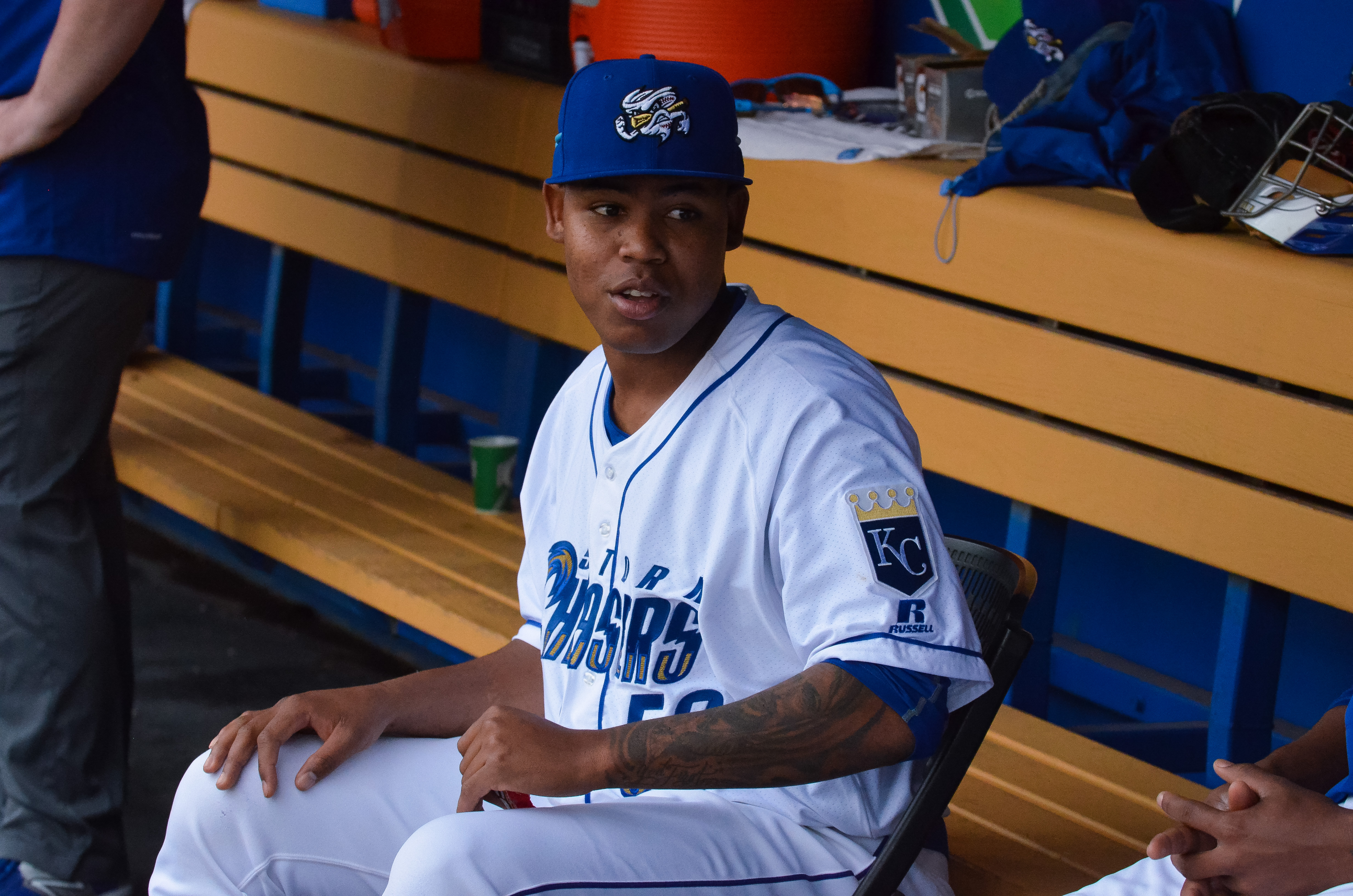
- Almonte with the Omaha Storm Chasers in 2016
- Pitcher
- Born: April 4, 1993 (age 33); Santiago, Dominican Republic
- Batted: Right Threw: Right

MLB debut
- September 1, 2015, for the Kansas City Royals

Last MLB appearance
- September 29, 2018, for the Los Angeles Angels

MLB statistics
- Win–loss record: 0–2
- Earned run average: 8.66
- Strikeouts: 17
- Stats at Baseball Reference

Teams
- Kansas City Royals (2015, 2017); Los Angeles Angels (2018)

Miguel Emilio Almonte (born April 4, 1993) is a Dominican former professional baseball pitcher. He played in Major League Baseball (MLB) for the Kansas City Royals and Los Angeles Angels.

== Career ==
=== Kansas City Royals ===
On November 20, 2010, Almonte signed with the Kansas City Royals organization as an international free agent. He made his professional debut with the Dominican Summer League Royals in 2011, posting a 5.40 ERA in 5 games. The following year, Almonte split the season between the DSL Royals and the Arizona League Royals, posting a cumulative 8–2 record and 1.75 ERA in 16 appearances. In 2013, he pitched for the World Team at the 2013 All-Star Futures Game. He finished the 2013 season with a 3.10 earned run average and 132 strikeouts in 130 2/3 innings for the Single-A Lexington Legends. Although the Royals considered starting him in Double-A, he started the 2014 season with the High-A Wilmington Blue Rocks. In 23 games with Wilmington, Almonte recorded a 6–8 record and 4.49 ERA with 101 strikeouts in 110 1/3 innings of work. Almonte began the 2015 season with the Double-A Northwest Arkansas Naturals before being promoted to the Triple-A Omaha Storm Chasers, logging a cumulative 6–6 record and 4.51 ERA.

On September 1, 2015, Almonte was selected to the 40-man roster and promoted to the major leagues for the first time. He made his MLB debut that day, allowing 2 earned runs in an inning of work against the Detroit Tigers. He finished his rookie season with a 6.23 ERA in 9 big league appearances. He spent the 2016 season in the minor leagues, recording a 5–8 record and 5.92 ERA in 32 games between Omaha and Northwest Arkansas. Almonte spent the majority of the 2017 in Double-A and Triple-A, and allowed 3 earned runs in 2.0 innings of work across 2 games for the Royals. Almonte was designated for assignment by Kansas City on April 2, 2018.

=== Los Angeles Angels ===
On April 4, 2018, Almonte was traded to the Los Angeles Angels in exchange for cash considerations. In 8 relief appearances with the Angels, he was 0–0 with a 10.29 ERA and 7 strikeouts in 7 innings. Almonte also struggled in 25 appearances for the Triple-A Salt Lake Bees, registering a 10.18 ERA. On January 20, 2019, Almonte was designated for assignment and outrighted on January 26. Almonte did not appear in a game for the Angels organization in 2019 and elected free agency on November 4.
