= Orlando Calixte =

Dominican baseball player (born 1992)

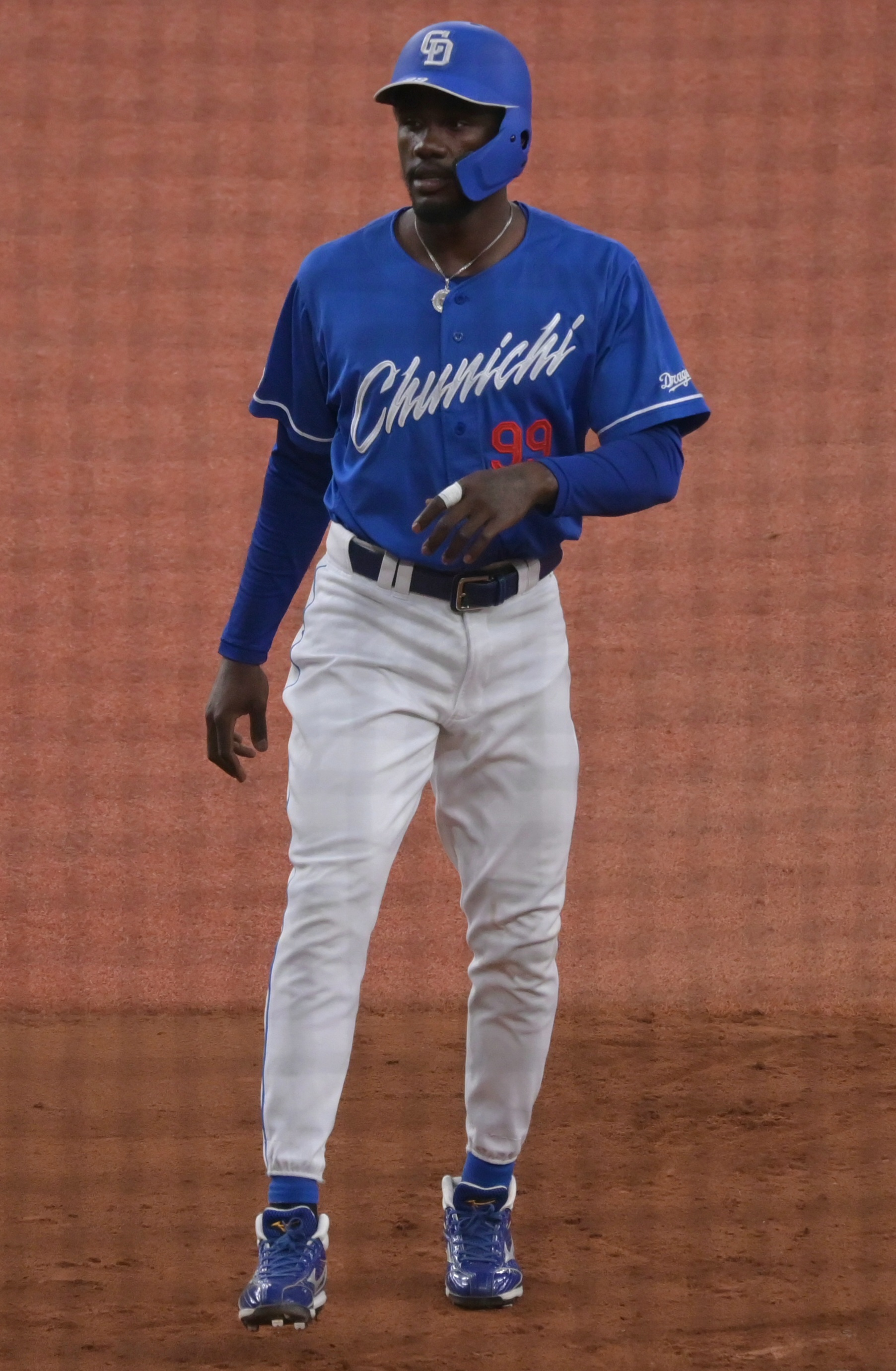
- Calixte with the Chunichi Dragons in 2023

Free agent
- Left fielder / Shortstop / Third baseman
- Born: February 3, 1992 (age 34); Santo Domingo, Dominican Republic
- Bats: Right Throws: Right

Professional debut
- MLB: April 19, 2015, for the Kansas City Royals
- NPB: April 1, 2023, for the Chunichi Dragons

MLB statistics (through 2017 season)
- Batting average: .135
- Home runs: 0
- Runs batted in: 6

NPB statistics (through 2026 season)
- Batting average: .242
- Home runs: 14
- Runs batted in: 66
- Stats at Baseball Reference

Teams
- Kansas City Royals (2015); San Francisco Giants (2017); Chunichi Dragons (2023–2026)

Orlando Calixte (born February 3, 1992) is a Dominican professional baseball outfielder and shortstop who is a free agent. He has previously played in Major League Baseball (MLB) for the Kansas City Royals and San Francisco Giants and in Nippon Professional Baseball (NPB) for the Chunichi Dragons.

== Background ==
Calixte was born in Santo Domingo, Dominican Republic to parents born in Haiti. His father Dieudonne, emigrated to the Dominican Republic in 1977; obtained legal status and had several other children who also pursued baseball.

== Career ==
=== Kansas City Royals ===
Calixte was signed by the Kansas City Royals as an international free agent in August 2010. He made his professional debut that season with the Dominican Summer League Royals. He played 2011 with the Kane County Cougars and 2012 with Kane County and Wilmington Blue Rocks. In 2013 and 2014 he played for the Double-A Northwest Arkansas Naturals.

Calixte began the 2015 season with the Omaha Storm Chasers of the Triple–A Pacific Coast League. They promoted him to the major leagues on April 19.

On December 2, 2015, the Royals decided to non-tender Calixte, making him a free agent. The following day, they re–signed him to a minor league contract. Calixte split the 2016 campaign between Northwest Arkansas and Omaha, hitting a combined .274/.324/.420 with 11 home runs, 43 RBI, and 19 stolen bases across 126 games. Calixte elected free agency following the season on November 7, 2016.

=== San Francisco Giants ===
On November 14, 2016, Calixte signed a minor league deal with the San Francisco Giants. The Giants added him to their 40-man roster four days later. He was called up to make his Giants debut against the Washington Nationals on May 30, 2017. In his first at bat of the 2017 season, he recorded his first career hit, a single to shallow center. In his second at bat, he hit a two-RBI double down the left field line. Calixte was optioned back down to the minors on June 9. In 29 games for the Giants, he batted .143/.185/.163 with six RBI. On November 27, Calixte was removed from the 40–man roster and sent outright to Triple–A.

Calixte spent the 2018 campaign with the Triple–A Sacramento River Cats, playing in 125 games and hitting .270/.323/.405 with 11 home runs, 48 RBI, and 14 stolen bases. He became a free agent after the season on November 2, 2018.

=== Seattle Mariners ===
On November 19, 2018, Calixte signed a minor league contract with the Seattle Mariners. He spent the 2019 campaign with the Triple–A Tacoma Rainiers, hitting .278/.327/.361 with two home runs and 10 RBI. Calixte elected free agency following the season on November 4, 2019.

=== New York Mets ===
On April 19, 2021, Calixte signed with the York Revolution of the Atlantic League of Professional Baseball. On May 24, before the start of the ALPB season, Calixte's contract was purchased by the New York Mets organization and he was assigned to the Triple-A Syracuse Mets. Calixte played in 64 games for Syracuse, hitting .235 with two home runs and 24 RBI. On September 17, the Mets released Calixte.

=== Sultanes de Monterrey ===
On January 27, 2022, Calixte signed with the Sultanes de Monterrey of the Mexican League. In 83 games for Monterrey, Calixte batted .344/.406/.554 with 13 home runs, 54 RBI, and 12 stolen bases.

=== Chunichi Dragons ===
On November 22, 2022, Calixte had signed with the Chunichi Dragons of Nippon Professional Baseball. In 47 appearances for Chunichi in 2023, he slashed .233/.265/.374 with five home runs and 13 RBI.

On October 22, 2023, Calixte re-signed with the Dragons for the 2024 season. He played in 114 contests for the team, batting .261/.287/.352 with seven home runs and 36 RBI.

On October 8, 2024, Calixte re-signed with the Dragons for the 2025 season.

On November 1, 2026, the Dragons announced they would not be bringing Calixte back for the 2027 season.
