= Adalberto Mondesí =

Dominican-American baseball player (born 1995)

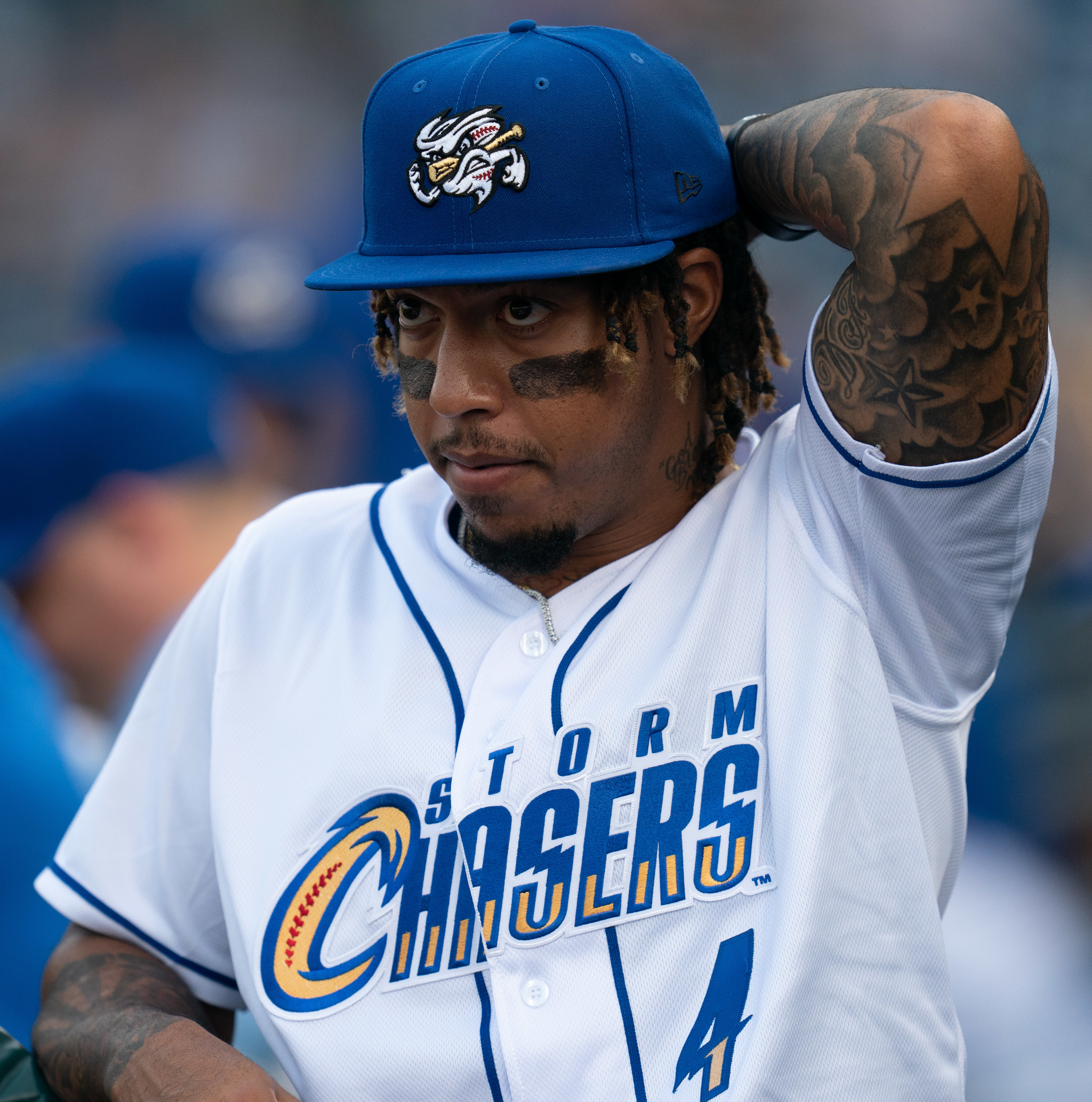
- Mondesí with the Omaha Storm Chasers in 2021
- Infielder
- Born: July 27, 1995 (age 31); Los Angeles, California, U.S.
- Batted: Switch Threw: Right

MLB debut
- October 30, 2015, for the Kansas City Royals

Last MLB appearance
- April 26, 2022, for the Kansas City Royals

MLB statistics
- Batting average: .244
- Home runs: 38
- Runs batted in: 157
- Stolen bases: 133
- Stats at Baseball Reference

Teams
- Kansas City Royals (2015–2022)

Career highlights and awards
- World Series champion (2015); AL stolen base leader (2020)

Raúl Adalberto Mondesí (born July 27, 1995) is a Dominican-American former professional baseball infielder. He has previously played in Major League Baseball (MLB) for the Kansas City Royals. Mondesí is the first player in modern MLB history to make his debut in the World Series, doing so with the Royals in Game 3 on October 30, 2015, against the New York Mets.

== Career ==
=== Minor leagues ===
Mondesí signed with the Kansas City Royals on July 27, 2011, receiving a signing bonus of $2 million. He made his professional debut in 2012 with the Idaho Falls Chukars of the Rookie-level Pioneer League, hitting .290/.346/.386 with three home runs in 50 games. Prior to the 2013 season, Mondesí was ranked by Baseball America as the team's seventh-best prospect. He played the 2013 season with the Lexington Legends of the Class A South Atlantic League. On May 27 he hit for the cycle. He finished the season hitting .261/.311/.361 with seven home runs. After the season, he was named the Class A Lexington Player of the Year by the Royals.

Prior to the 2014 season, Mondesí was considered one of the top prospects in baseball. He was ranked by Baseball America as the team's third-best prospect. He was ranked by MLB.com as the 38th best prospect overall. Mondesi spent the 2014 season with the Wilmington Blue Rocks of the Class A-Advanced Carolina League, and played for the Peoria Javelinas of the Arizona Fall League after the regular season.

In 2015, Mondesi played for the Northwest Arkansas Naturals of the Double-A Texas League. He appeared in the 2015 All-Star Futures Game.

=== Kansas City Royals ===
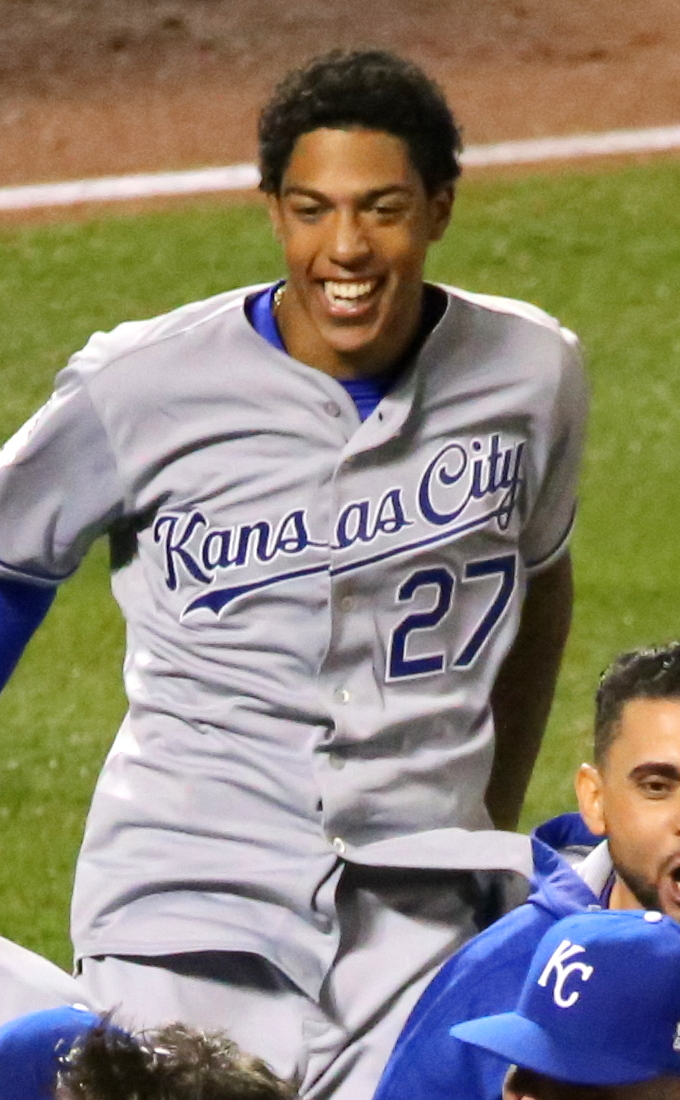
Mondesí during the 2015 World Series

The Royals added Mondesi to their active roster for the 2015 World Series. He became the first player since Bug Holliday in 1885 to make his major league debut during a championship series, when he pinch hit during Game 3 for pitcher Danny Duffy and struck out against New York Mets pitcher Noah Syndergaard. He won his first World Series ring when the Royals defeated the New York Mets in five games.

Mondesi began the 2016 season in Double-A. On May 10, Mondesi was suspended 50 games after testing positive for clenbuterol which is banned by Major League Baseball. His suspension was originally 80 games, but was reduced due to the substance having been ingested via cold medicine. On August 16, Mondesi hit his first major league home run against Detroit Tigers pitcher Justin Verlander. Mondesi became the youngest Royal to hit a home run since Clint Hurdle in 1978. Mondesi ended the 2016 season with a major-league slash line of .185/.231/.281 with nine stolen bases in 47 games. Mondesi spent the majority of the 2017 season in Triple-A. He appeared in 25 games in the major leagues, slashing .170/.214/.245 with five stolen bases.

After beginning the 2018 season in the minors, Mondesi was recalled during the month of June to play shortstop regularly. In 75 games, he slashed .276/.306/.498 and hit 14 home runs with 32 stolen bases. In 2019, Mondesi hit 9 home runs with 62 RBIs in 102 games. In 2020, Mondesi had a .256/.294/.416 slash line with 6 home runs and 22 RBIs in 59 games of the shortened season, and led the AL in both stolen bases (24) and caught stealing (8).

In 2021, to open the season, Mondesí was placed in the injured list with a right oblique muscle strain. He played in only seven games, during May 25–31, before being placed on the injured list again after straining his left hamstring. He returned on June 16, but played in only three games with the Royals before going back on the injured list. In ten games with the Royals, he batted .361 with four home runs and nine RBIs. On August 3, he began a rehab assignment with the Triple-A Omaha Storm Chasers, playing in five games, but returned to Kansas City on August 15 for examination by team medical staff after experiencing oblique tightness. On August 19, he began another rehab assignment with Omaha. On September 1, he returned to the Royals lineup versus the Cleveland Indians. He completed the season with a .240 batting average, along with six home runs and 17 RBIs in 35 games.

In 2022, Mondesí was batting .140 in 15 games when he sustained a torn left anterior cruciate ligament (ACL). He underwent surgery in May and missed the rest of the season.

Overall with the Royals, Mondesí appeared in 358 regular-season games, batting .244 with 38 home runs, 157 RBIs, and an 83.6% success rate on stolen base attempts (133-for-159). Defensively, he made 262 appearances at shortstop, 68 at second base, 20 at third base, and 11 as designated hitter. He registered an aggregate .982 fielding percentage.

=== Boston Red Sox ===
On January 24, 2023, the Royals traded Mondesí and a player to be named later (named in March as minor-league infielder Angel Pierre) to the Boston Red Sox for Josh Taylor. On March 30, Mondesi was placed on the 60-day injured list due to a left ACL tear. He ultimately missed the entire season. He became a free agent after the season.

== Personal life ==
Mondesí is the son of former MLB player Raúl Mondesí. Known as Adalberto when he signed with the Royals, Mondesí went by Raúl Mondesí (and was sometimes referred to in media as Raúl A. Mondesí or Raúl Mondesí Jr.) from 2015 to 2018. He was born in Los Angeles, California, while his father played for the Los Angeles Dodgers. He grew up in the Dominican Republic.

== See also ==
- List of Major League Baseball players suspended for performance-enhancing drugs
- List of second-generation Major League Baseball players
