= 2014 Oakland Athletics season =

2014 Oakland Athletics
- American League Wild Card winners
- League: American League
- Division: West
- Ballpark: O.co Coliseum
- City: Oakland, California
- Record: 88–74 (.543)
- Divisional place: 2nd
- Owners: Lewis Wolff, John Fisher
- General managers: Billy Beane
- Managers: Bob Melvin
- Television: Comcast SportsNet California (Glen Kuiper, Ray Fosse, Shooty Babitt)
- Radio: KGMZ (Ken Korach, Vince Cotroneo, Ray Fosse)

The 2014 Oakland Athletics season was the 46th for the franchise in Oakland, as well as the 114th in club history. The Athletics entered the season hoping to win a third consecutive American League West championship; to that end, the team made a number of key signings and trades during the 2013–14 MLB offseason. Notably, Athletics traded outfielder Michael Choice for left fielder Craig Gentry and pitcher Josh Lindblom; they also traded the promising but oft-injured Brett Anderson for reliever Drew Pomeranz. Additional trades brought in relievers Fernando Abad (acquired for John Wooten), Luke Gregerson (acquired for Seth Smith), and Jim Johnson (acquired for Jemile Weeks and David Freitas). In free agency, the Athletics signed former All-Star starting pitcher Scott Kazmir to a two-year deal. These moves, among others, sought to bolster the depth of team's starting pitching and bullpen.

Shortly before the season opener, the Athletics were dealt a huge blow when starting pitchers Jarrod Parker and A. J. Griffin were ruled out for the season. The team responded by promoting reliever Jesse Chavez (and, eventually, Drew Pomeranz) to the starting rotation. Despite this setback, the team raced out to an impressive start; by the All-Star Break, the Athletics had compiled a league-best record of 59–36. Unexpectedly strong performances by starting pitchers Scott Kazmir, Jesse Chavez, and Drew Pomeranz enabled much of this surge; the Athletics' red-hot hitters (particularly sluggers Josh Donaldson, Yoenis Céspedes, and Brandon Moss) also played a major role.

Despite their fantastic first-half performance, the Athletics remained locked in a tight battle for first place in the American League West. The Los Angeles Angels of Anaheim, like the Athletics, had also raced out to an impressive start; at the All-Star Break, the Angels owned the league's second-best record (and, at 57-37, only trailed the Athletics by 1.5 games). In part because of this, the Athletics traded noted prospects Addison Russell and Billy McKinney, along with starting pitcher Dan Straily, to the Chicago Cubs for two starters (ace Jeff Samardzija and veteran Jason Hammel) on July 4.

The Athletics continued to play well throughout July. Still, they failed to gain significant ground on the Angels. On July 31, with a 2.5 game lead over Los Angeles, the Athletics stunned the league by trading Yoenis Céspedes for all-star starter Jon Lester and outfielder Jonny Gomes. In the week immediately following the trade, things went well for the team; by August 9, they had raised their lead over the Angels to four games. From that point forward, however, the A's tumbled into a downward spiral as they won just 16 of their final 46 games due to ineffective hitting and a spate of narrow losses. The Athletics only managed to clinch an AL Wild Card berth on the final day of the regular season. The team finished some ten games behind the Angels, who clinched the league's best record with a 98-64 finish.

The Athletics met the Kansas City Royals in the 2014 American League Wild Card Game. The Athletics held a 7–3 lead over the Royals through seven innings; a Royals rally tied the game, with three runs in the eight inning, and one in the ninth. In the 12th inning, the Athletics' took an 8-7 lead on an Alberto Callaspo line drive; the Royals, however, would again rally for a 9–8 walk-off victory (their first playoff win in 29 years). The Athletics did not reach the postseason again until the 2018 season.

== Regular season ==
Oakland's 2014 season was full of ups and downs. They held the best record in the MLB at (59-36) going into the All-Star break, and were ranked by the Bleacher Report as the number one team in Major League Baseball. By mid-August, however, the Athletics had quickly begun losing ground in the AL race with a record of 11–25 through a 36-game span from August 10, to September 19, and were in the midst of what some called an historic collapse. General manager Billy Beane and his well-known "Moneyball" strategy came under increased scrutiny when Oakland made several personnel transactions, the most significant of which was finalized on July 31, 2014, while they still maintained a 2-game division lead over the Los Angeles Angels of Anaheim. This deal sent All Star left fielder Yoenis Céspedes to the Boston Red Sox in return for starting pitcher Jon Lester and veteran outfielder Jonny Gomes. They would finish the season with a record of (88–74) and finished the second half of the year with a (29-38) record. Ended the season 10 games out of first place behind the Angels, and barely clinched the 2nd Wild Card spot just one game ahead of division rival, Seattle Mariners.

=== American League West ===
AL West
Team	W	L	Pct.	GB	Home	Road
Los Angeles Angels	98	64	.605	—	52‍–‍29	46‍–‍35
Oakland Athletics	88	74	.543	10	48‍–‍33	40‍–‍41
Seattle Mariners	87	75	.537	11	41‍–‍40	46‍–‍35
Houston Astros	70	92	.432	28	38‍–‍43	32‍–‍49
Texas Rangers	67	95	.414	31	33‍–‍48	34‍–‍47

=== American League Wild Card ===
Division leaders
Team	W	L	Pct.
Los Angeles Angels	98	64	.605
Baltimore Orioles	96	66	.593
Detroit Tigers	90	72	.556

Wild Card teams (Top 2 teams qualify for postseason)
Team	W	L	Pct.	GB
Kansas City Royals	89	73	.549	+1
Oakland Athletics	88	74	.543	—
Seattle Mariners	87	75	.537	1
Cleveland Indians	85	77	.525	3
New York Yankees	84	78	.519	4
Toronto Blue Jays	83	79	.512	5
Tampa Bay Rays	77	85	.475	11
Chicago White Sox	73	89	.451	15
Boston Red Sox	71	91	.438	17
Houston Astros	70	92	.432	18
Minnesota Twins	70	92	.432	18
Texas Rangers	67	95	.414	21

=== Record against opponents ===
Final season record

2014 American League record Source: MLB Standings Grid – 2014
Team	BAL	BOS	CWS	CLE	DET	HOU	KC	LAA	MIN	NYY	OAK	SEA	TB	TEX	TOR	NL
Baltimore	—	11–8	5–1	3–4	1–5	4–3	3–4	4–2	4–3	13–6	2–4	5–2	12–7	6–1	11–8	12–8
Boston	8–11	—	4–3	2–5	1–5	4–3	6–1	2–5	4–2	7–12	3–4	1–5	9–10	4–2	7–12	9–11
Chicago	1–5	3–4	—	9–10	9–10	3–3	6–13	1–5	9–10	2–5	4–3	3–4	5–2	2–4	5–2	11–9
Cleveland	4–3	5–2	10–9	—	8–11	5–2	10–9	2–5	11–8	4–3	2–4	2–4	4–2	6–1	2–4	10–10
Detroit	5–1	5–1	10–9	11–8	—	4–3	13–6	3–4	9–10	3–4	5–2	2–4	3–4	4–3	1–5	12–8
Houston	3–4	3–4	3–3	2–5	3–4	—	3–3	7–12	3–3	4–2	8–11	9–10	2–5	11–8	4–3	5–15
Kansas City	4–3	1–6	13–6	9–10	6–13	3–3	—	3–3	11–8	4–3	5–2	2–5	4–2	5–1	4–3	15–5
Los Angeles	2–4	5–2	5–1	5–2	4–3	12–7	3–3	—	7–0	2–4	10–9	7–12	5–2	14–5	5–2	12–8
Minnesota	3–4	2–4	10–9	8–11	10–9	3–3	8–11	0–7	—	3–4	1–6	5–2	2–4	2–5	4–2	9–11
New York	6–13	12–7	5–2	3–4	4–3	2–4	3–4	4–2	4–3	—	2–4	3–3	8–11	4–3	11–8	13–7
Oakland	4–2	4–3	3–4	4–2	2–5	11–8	2–5	9–10	6–1	4–2	—	9–10	4–2	9–10	4–3	13–7
Seattle	2–5	5–1	4–3	4–2	4–2	10–9	5–2	12–7	2–5	3–3	10–9	—	4–3	9–10	4–3	9–11
Tampa Bay	7–12	10–9	2–5	2–4	4–3	5–2	2–4	2–5	4–2	11–8	2–4	3–4	—	5–2	8–11	10–10
Texas	1–6	2–4	4–2	1–6	3–4	8–11	1–5	5–14	5–2	3–4	10–9	10–9	2–5	—	2–4	10–10
Toronto	8–11	12–7	2–5	4–2	5–1	3–4	3–4	2–5	2–4	8–11	3–4	3–4	11–8	4–2	—	13–7

== Schedule and results ==
=== Game log ===
Legend
Athletics Win	Athletics Loss	Game postponed / Tie	Home Game

2014 Game Log
Total: 88-74 (Home: 48-33; Away: 40-41)
March: 0-1 (Home: 0-1; Away: 0-0)

#	Date	Opponent / Time	Score	Win	Loss	Save	Attendance	Record
1	March 31	Indians	0-2	Cody Allen (1-0)	Jim Johnson (0-1)	John Axford (1)	36,067	0-1

April: 18-9 (Home: 6-5; Away: 12-4)

#	Date	Opponent / Time	Score	Win	Loss	Save	Attendance	Record
2	April 1	Indians	PPD, RAIN; rescheduled for April 2					
2	April 2	Indians	6-1	Scott Kazmir (1-0)	Corey Kluber (0-1)	–	15,134	1-1
3	April 2	Indians	4-6	Cody Allen (2-0)	Jim Johnson (0-2)	John Axford (1)	12,198	1-2
4	April 3	Mariners	3-2 (12)	Drew Pomeranz (1-0)	Héctor Noesí (0-1)	–	11,236	2-2
5	April 4	Mariners	PPD, FIELD CONDITIONS; rescheduled for May 7					
5	April 5	Mariners	1-3	Félix Hernández (2-0)	Dan Straily (0-1)	Fernando Rodney (1)	30,290	2-3
6	April 6	Mariners	6-3	Sonny Gray (1-0)	Erasmo Ramirez (1-1)	Jim Johnson (1)	32,852	3-3
7	April 7	@ Twins	8-3	Scott Kazmir (2-0)	Kevin Correia (0-1)	–	35,837	4-3
8	April 9	@ Twins	7-4 (11)	Dan Otero (1-0)	Jared Burton (0-1)	–	22,973	5-3
9	April 10	@ Twins	6-1	Dan Straily (1-1)	Mike Pelfrey (0-2)	–	20,650	6-3
10	April 11	@ Mariners	4-6	Félix Hernández (3-0)	Tommy Milone (0-1)	Fernando Rodney (3)	38,968	6-4
11	April 12	@ Mariners	3-1	Sonny Gray (2-0)	Erasmo Ramirez (1-2)	Luke Gregerson (1)	22,061	7-4
12	April 13	@ Mariners	3-0	Dan Otero (2-0)	Charlie Furbush (0-1)	Sean Doolittle (1)	22,628	8-4
13	April 14	@ Angels	3-2	Jim Johnson (1-2)	Ernesto Frieri (0-1)	Luke Gregerson (2)	37,120	9-4
14	April 15	@ Angels	10-9 (11)	Jim Johnson (2-2)	Yoslan Herrera (0-1)	–	34,887	10-4
15	April 16	@ Angels	4-5 (12)	Joe Smith (1-0)	Drew Pomeranz (1-1)	–	37,324	10-5
16	April 18	Astros	11-3	Sonny Gray (3-0)	Jarred Cosart (1-2)	–	18,234	11-5
17	April 19	Astros	4-3	Dan Otero (3-0)	Chad Qualls (0-1)	–	33,166	12-5
18	April 20	Astros	4-1	Jesse Chavez (1-0)	Brad Peacock (0-2)	Luke Gregerson (3)	16,382	13-5
19	April 21	Rangers	3-4	Neal Cotts (1-1)	Sean Doolittle (0-1)	Joakim Soria (4)	13,297	13-6
20	April 22	Rangers	4-5	Alexi Ogando (1-1)	Luke Gregerson (0-1)	Joakim Soria (5)	15,744	13-7
21	April 23	Rangers	0-3	Martin Perez (4-0)	Sonny Gray (3-1)	–	18,340	13-8
22	April 24	@ Astros	10-1	Scott Kazmir (3-0)	Brett Oberholtzer (0-4)	–	19,987	14-8
23	April 25	@ Astros	12-5	Luke Gregerson (1-1)	Josh Fields (0-2)	–	17,708	15-8
24	April 26	@Astros	6-7	Jerome Williams (1-1)	Sean Doolittle (0-2)	Raúl Valdés (1)	17,850	15-9
25	April 27	@ Astros	1-5	Collin McHugh (2-0)	Tommy Milone (0-2)	–	18,935	15-10
26	April 28	@Rangers	4-0	Sonny Gray (4-1)	Yu Darvish (1-1)	–	28,548	16-10
27	April 29	@Rangers	9-3	Scott Kazmir (4-0)	Martin Perez (4-1)	–	30,221	17-10
28	April 30	@ Rangers	12-1	Jesse Chavez (2-0)	Robbie Ross (1-2)	–	32,979	18-10

May: 16-12 (Home: 10-6; Away: 6-6)

#	Date	Opponent / Time	Score	Win	Loss	Save	Attendance	Record
29	May 2	@ Red Sox	1-7	Clay Buchholz (2-2)	Dan Straily (1-2)	–	34,850	18-11
30	May 3	@ Red Sox	3-6	Jon Lester (3-4)	Tommy Milone (0-3)	Koji Uehara (7)	37,042	18-12
31	May 4	@ Red Sox	3-2 (10)	Jim Johnson (3-2)	Chris Capuano (1-1)	–	35,649	19-12
32	May 5	Mariners	2-4	Chris Young (2-0)	Scott Kazmir (4-1)	Fernando Rodney (8)	11,019	19-13
33	May 6	Mariners	3-8	Roenis Elias (3-2)	Jesse Chavez (2-1)	–	12,106	19-14
34	May 7	Mariners	4-6	Yoervis Medina (2-1)	Ryan Cook (0-1)	Fernando Rodney (9)	17,337	19-15
35	May 7	Mariners	2-0	Drew Pomeranz (2-1)	Erasmo Ramirez (1-4)	Jim Johnson (2)	17,337	20-15
36	May 9	Nationals	8-0	Tommy Milone (1-3)	Doug Fister (0-1)	–	20,159	21-15
37	May 10	Nationals	4-3 (10)	Sean Doolittle (1-2)	Drew Storen (2-1)	–	36,067	22-15
38	May 11	Nationals	9-1	Scott Kazmir (5-1)	Gio González (3-3)	–	28,205	23-15
39	May 12	White Sox	5-4	Jesse Chavez (3-1)	John Danks (3-3)	Sean Doolittle (2)	10,120	24-15
40	May 13	White Sox	11-0	Drew Pomeranz (3-1)	Scott Carroll (1-3)	–	13,826	25-15
41	May 14	White Sox	2-4	Ronald Belisario (2-3)	Fernando Abad (0-1)	Matt Lindstrom (6)	18,035	25-16
42	May 16	@ Indians	11-1	Sonny Gray (5-1)	Zach McAllister (3-4)	–	21,389	26-16
43	May 17	@ Indians	6-2	Dan Otero (4-0)	Josh Tomlin (2-1)	–	18,358	27-16
44	May 18	@ Indians	13-3	Jesse Chavez (4-1)	Justin Masterson (2-3)	–	14,872	28-16
45	May 20	@ Rays	3-0	Drew Pomeranz (4-1)	Jake Odorizzi (2-4)	Sean Doolittle (3)	11,369	29-16
46	May 21	@ Rays	3-2	Tommy Milone (2-3)	Érik Bédard (2-2)	Sean Doolittle (4)	10,555	30-16
47	May 22	@ Rays	2-5 (11)	Josh Lueke (1-2)	Dan Otero (4-1)	–	11,257	30-17
48	May 23	@ Blue Jays	2-3	Liam Hendriks (1-0)	Scott Kazmir (5-2)	Casey Janssen (6)	21,007	30-18
49	May 24	@ Blue Jays	2-5	R. A. Dickey (5-4)	Jesse Chavez (4-2)	Brett Cecil (3)	29,372	30-19
50	May 25	@Blue Jays	1-3	J. A. Happ (4-1)	Drew Pomeranz (4-2)	Casey Janssen (7)	45,277	30-20
51	May 26	Tigers	10-0	Tommy Milone (3-3)	Drew Smyly (2-3)	–	35,067	31-20
52	May 27	Tigers	5-6	Al Alburquerque (2-1)	Fernando Abad (0-2)	Joe Nathan (12)	21,549	31-21
53	May 28	Tigers	3-1	Scott Kazmir (6-2)	Joe Nathan (2-1)	—	15,590	32-21
54	May 29	Tigers	4-5	Rick Porcello (8-2)	Jesse Chavez (4-3)	Joe Nathan (13)	21,860	32-22
55	May 30	Angels	9-5	Drew Pomeranz (5-2)	Garrett Richards (4-2)	—	23,384	33-22
56	May 31	Angels	11-3	Fernando Rodriguez (1-0)	Tyler Skaggs (4-3)	—	35,067	34-22

June: 17-9 (Home: 8-3; Away: 9-6)

#	Date	Opponent / Time	Score	Win	Loss	Save	Attendance	Record
57	June 1	Angels	6-3	Sonny Gray (6-1)	Jered Weaver (6-4)	Sean Doolittle (5)	32,231	35-22
58	June 3	@ Yankees	5-2 (10)	Dan Otero (5-1)	Adam Warren (1-3)	Sean Doolittle (6)	41,677	36-22
59	June 4	@ Yankees	7-4	Jesse Chavez (5-3)	José Ramírez (0-1)	Sean Doolittle (7)	37,734	37-22
60	June 5	@ Yankees	1-2	Masahiro Tanaka (9-1)	Drew Pomeranz (5-3)	David Robertson (13)	44,346	37-23
61	June 6	@ Orioles	4-3 (11)	Fernando Abad (1-2)	Evan Meek (0-2)	Sean Doolittle (8)	28,076	38-23
62	June 7	@ Orioles	3-6	Kevin Gausman (1-1)	Sonny Gray (6-2)	–	44,202	38-24
63	June 8	@ Orioles	11-1	Scott Kazmir (7-2)	Ubaldo Jiménez (2-7)	–	38,244	39-24
64	June 9	@ Angels	1-4	Garrett Richards (6-2)	Jesse Chavez (5-4)	Ernesto Frieri (11)	36,838	39-25
65	June 10	@ Angels	1-2 (15)	Cory Rasmus (2-0)	Jeff Francis (0-2)	–	31,942	39-26
66	June 11	@ Angels	7-1	Tommy Milone (4-3)	Jered Weaver (7-5)	–	36,793	40-26
67	June 13	Yankees	0-7	David Phelps (2-4)	Sonny Gray (6-3)	–	36,067	40-27
68	June 14	Yankees	5-1	Scott Kazmir (8-2)	Hiroki Kuroda (4-5)	–	36,067	41-27
69	June 15	Yankees	10-5	Jesse Chavez (6-4)	Vidal Nuño (1-3)	–	36,067	42-27
70	June 16	Rangers	8-14	Colby Lewis (5-4)	Drew Pomeranz (5-4)	–	12,412	42-28
71	June 17	Rangers	10-6	Tommy Milone (5-3)	Yu Darvish (7-3)	–	21,288	43-28
72	June 18	Rangers	4-2	Sonny Gray (7-3)	Nick Tepesch (2-3)	Sean Doolittle (9)	23,175	44-28
73	June 19	Red Sox	4-2	Scott Kazmir (9-2)	Jake Peavy (1-5)	Dan Otero (1)	24,371	45-28
74	June 20	Red Sox	4-3	Fernando Abad (2-2)	Andrew Miller (2-5)	Sean Doolittle (10)	28,602	46-28
75	June 21	Red Sox	2-1 (10)	Dan Otero (6-1)	Edward Mujica (2-3)	–	32,873	47-28
76	June 22	Red Sox	6-7 (10)	Koji Uehara (3-1)	Fernando Abad (2-3)	–	36,067	47-29
77	June 24	@Mets	1-10	Bartolo Colón (8-5)	Scott Kazmir (9-3)	–	25,751	47-30
78	June 25	@Mets	8-5	Brad Mills (1-0)	Zack Wheeler (3-8)	Sean Doolittle (11)	23,367	48-30
79	June 27	@ Marlins	9-5	Luke Gregerson (2-1)	Steve Cishek (4-3)	–	18,666	49-30
80	June 28	@ Marlins	7-6 (14)	Jim Johnson (4-2)	Jacob Turner (2-6)	Jeff Francis (1)	19,358	50-30
81	June 29	@ Marlins	4-3	Tommy Milone (6-3)	Andrew Heaney (0-3)	Ryan Cook (1)	21,917	51-30
82	June 30	@ Tigers	4-5	Blaine Hardy (1-1)	Sean Doolittle (1-3)	–	42,477	51-31

July: 15-10 (Home: 10-2; Away: 5-8)

#	Date	Opponent / Time	Score	Win	Loss	Save	Attendance	Record
83	July 1	@ Tigers	0-3	Rick Porcello (11-4)	Brad Mills (1-1)	–	32,455	51-32
84	July 2	@ Tigers	3-9	Justin Verlander (7-7)	Jesse Chavez (6-5)	–	35,445	51-33
85	July 3	Blue Jays	4-1	Sonny Gray (8-3)	R. A. Dickey (6-8)	Sean Doolittle (12)	32,913	52-33
86	July 4	Blue Jays	1-0 (12)	Dan Otero (7-1)	Chad Jenkins (0-1)	–	22,322	53-33
87	July 5	Blue Jays	5-1	Scott Kazmir (10-3)	Mark Buehrle (10-6)	–	20,236	54-33
88	July 6	Blue Jays	4-2	Jeff Samardzija (1-0)	Drew Hutchison (6-7)	Sean Doolittle (13)	22,897	55-33
89	July 7	Giants	5-0	Jesse Chavez (7-5)	Ryan Vogelsong (5-6)	–	36,067	56-33
90	July 8	Giants	6-1	Sonny Gray (9-3)	Madison Bumgarner (9-7)	–	36,067	57-33
91	July 9	@ Giants	2-5	Matt Cain (2-7)	Jason Hammel (0-1)	–	41,427	57-34
92	July 10	@ Giants	6-1	Scott Kazmir (11-3)	Tim Hudson (7-6)	–	41,069	58-34
93	July 11	@ Mariners	2-3	Félix Hernández (11-2)	Jeff Samardzija (1-1)	Fernando Rodney (29)	32,971	58-35
94	July 12	@ Mariners	2-6	Hisashi Iwakuma (8-4)	Jesse Chavez (7-6)	–	39,204	58-36
95	July 13	@ Mariners	4-1	Sonny Gray (10-3)	Chris Young (8-6)	Sean Doolittle (14)	25,944	59-36
--	July 15	85th All-Star Game	National League 3 American League 5 (Minneapolis, Minnesota; Target Field)					
96	July 18	Orioles	5-4	Eric O'Flaherty (1-0)	Zach Britton (3-2)	–	27,232	60-36
97	July 19	Orioles	4-8	Wei-Yin Chen (10-3)	Jason Hammel (0-2)	Zach Britton (16)	36,067	60-37
98	July 20	Orioles	10-2	Sonny Gray (11-3)	Kevin Gausman (4-3)	–	30,124	61-37
99	July 22	Astros	2-3 (12)	Darin Downs (2-1)	Fernando Abad (2-4)	Chad Qualls (11)	22,908	61-38
100	July 23	Astros	9-7	Jesse Chavez (8-6)	Brad Peacock (3-7)	Sean Doolittle (15)	28,310	62-38
101	July 24	Astros	13-1	Jeff Samardzija (2-1)	Scott Feldman (4-8)	–	22,759	63-38
102	July 25	@Rangers	1-4	Jerome Williams (2-4)	Jason Hammel (0-3)	Neftalí Feliz (1)	35,582	63-39
103	July 26	@Rangers	5-1	Sonny Gray (12-3)	Nick Tepesch (3-7)	–	34,651	64-39
104	July 27	@ Rangers	9-3	Scott Kazmir (12-3)	Miles Mikolas (1-3)	–	38,915	65-39
105	July 28	@ Astros	3-7	Brett Oberholtzer (3-7)	Jesse Chavez (8-7)	–	18,259	65-40
106	July 29	@ Astros	7-4	Evan Scribner (1-0)	Chad Qualls (1-2)	Sean Doolittle (16)	16,940	66-40
107	July 30	@ Astros	1-8	Dallas Keuchel (10-7)	Jason Hammel (0-4)	–	17,637	66-41

August: 12-17 (Home: 9-6; Away: 3-11)

#	Date	Opponent / Time	Score	Win	Loss	Save	Attendance	Record
108	August 1	Royals	0-1	Jeremy Guthrie (7-9)	Sonny Gray (12-4)	Greg Holland (30)	35,067	66-42
109	August 2	Royals	8-3	Jon Lester (1-0)	Jason Vargas (8-5)	–	30,097	67-42
110	August 3	Royals	2-4	James Shields (10-6)	Scott Kazmir (12-4)	Greg Holland (31)	22,612	67-43
111	August 4	Rays	3-2 (10)	Ryan Cook (1-1)	Grant Balfour (1-4)	–	18,479	68-43
112	August 5	Rays	3-0	Jason Hammel (1-4)	Drew Smyly (6-10)	Sean Doolittle (17)	16,335	69-43
113	August 6	Rays	3-7	Jeremy Hellickson (1-1)	Sonny Gray (12-5)	–	21,513	69-44
114	August 7	Twins	3-0	Jon Lester (2-0)	Yohan Pino (1-4)	–	22,108	70-44
115	August 8	Twins	6-5	Scott Kazmir (13-4)	Kyle Gibson (10-9)	Sean Doolittle (18)	20,196	71-44
116	August 9	Twins	9-4	Jeff Samardzija (3-1)	Trevor May (0-1)	–	32,074	72-44
117	August 10	Twins	1-6	Phil Hughes (12-8)	Luke Gregerson (2-2)	–	25,598	72-45
118	August 11	@ Royals	2-3	Kelvin Herrera (3-2)	Sonny Gray (12-6)	Greg Holland (35)	21,479	72-46
119	August 12	@ Royals	11-3	Jon Lester (3-0)	Jeremy Guthrie (8-10)	–	27,161	73-46
120	August 13	@ Royals	0-3	Jason Vargas (9-5)	Scott Kazmir (13-5)	–	21,099	73-47
121	August 14	@ Royals	3-7	Aaron Crow (6-1)	Jeff Samardzija (3-2)	Greg Holland (36)	20,569	73-48
122	August 15	@ Braves	2-7	Alex Wood (9-9)	Jason Hammel (1-5)	–	30,606	73-49
123	August 16	@ Braves	3-4	Julio Teherán (11-9)	Sonny Gray (12-7)	Craig Kimbrel (36)	40,760	73-50
124	August 17	@ Braves	3-4	Mike Minor (5-8)	Jon Lester (3-1)	Craig Kimbrel (37)	25,461	73-51
125	August 19	Mets	6-2	Scott Kazmir (14-5)	Dillon Gee (4-6)	–	23,498	74-51
126	August 20	Mets	5-8	Zack Wheeler (9-8)	Jeff Samardzija (3-3)	Jeurys Familia (4)	20,312	74-52
127	August 22	Angels	5-3	Sonny Gray (13-7)	Jason Grilli (1-4)	Sean Doolittle (19)	33,810	75-52
128	August 23	Angels	2-1	Luke Gregerson (3-2)	Joe Smith (5-2)	Sean Doolittle (20)	36,067	76-52
129	August 24	Angels	4-9	Jered Weaver (14-7)	Scott Kazmir (14-6)	–	36,067	76-53
130	August 25	@ Astros	8-2	Jeff Samardzija (4-3)	Scott Feldman (7-10)	–	14,094	77-53
131	August 26	@ Astros	2-4	Josh Fields (4-6)	Luke Gregerson (3-3)	Chad Qualls (15)	17,345	77-54
132	August 27	@ Astros	5-4	Dan Otero (8-1)	Chad Qualls (1-4)	Eric O'Flaherty (1)	14,791	78-54
133	August 28	@ Angels	3-4 (10)	Fernando Salas (5-0)	Ryan Cook (1-2)	–	41,056	78-55
134	August 29	@ Angels	0-4	Jered Weaver (15-7)	Jon Lester (3-2)	–	41,177	78-56
135	August 30	@ Angels	0-2	Yoslan Herrera (1-1)	Jeff Samardzija (4-3)	Huston Street (11)	44,018	78-57
136	August 31	@ Angels	1-8	Matt Shoemaker (14-4)	Scott Kazmir (14-7)	–	44,205	78-58

September: 10-16 (Home: 5-10; Away: 5-6)

#	Date	Opponent / Time	Score	Win	Loss	Save	Attendance	Record
137	September 1	Mariners	6-1	Jason Hammel (2-5)	Chris Young (12-7)	–	36,067	79-58
138	September 2	Mariners	5-6	James Paxton (5-1)	Sonny Gray (13-8)	Fernando Rodney (40)	23,859	79-59
139	September 3	Mariners	1-2	Félix Hernández (14-5)	Jon Lester (3-3)	Fernando Rodney (41)	17,073	79-60
140	September 5	Astros	3-4	Brett Oberholtzer (5-10)	Jeff Samardzija (4-4)	Tony Sipp (3)	21,130	79-61
141	September 6	Astros	4-3	Luke Gregerson (4-3)	Chad Qualls (1-5)	–	28,668	80-61
142	September 7	Astros	3-4	José Veras (4-0)	Ryan Cook (1-3)	Josh Fields (3)	25,533	80-62
143	September 8	@ White Sox	4-5 (11)	Javy Guerra (2-3)	Jesse Chavez (8-8)	–	15,517	80-63
144	September 9	@ White Sox	11-2	Jon Lester (4-3)	John Danks (9-11)	–	12,150	81-63
145	September 10	@ White Sox	1-2	Zach Putnam (5-3)	Luke Gregerson (4-4)	Jake Petricka (12)	15,046	81-64
146	September 11	@ White Sox	0-1	Chris Sale (12-3)	Scott Kazmir (14-8)	Jake Petricka (13)	12,314	81-65
147	September 12	@ Mariners	2-4	James Paxton (6-2)	Jason Hammel (2-6)	Fernando Rodney (45)	29,090	81-66
148	September 13	@ Mariners	3-2	Luke Gregerson (5-4)	Fernando Rodney (1-6)	Sean Doolittle (21)	43,913	82-66
149	September 14	@ Mariners	4-0	Jon Lester (5-3)	Chris Young (12-8)	–	28,925	83-66
150	September 16	Rangers	3-6	Nick Tepesch (5-10)	Scott Kazmir (14-9)	Neftalí Feliz (10)	19,835	83-67
151	September 17	Rangers	1-6	Robbie Ross (3-6)	Sean Doolittle (1-4)	–	17,530	83-68
152	September 18	Rangers	2-7	Nick Martinez (4-11)	Sonny Gray (13-9)	–	17,574	83-69
153	September 19	Phillies	3-1	Jon Lester (16-10)	David Buchanan (6-8)	Sean Doolittle (22)	35,067	84-69
154	September 20	Phillies	0-3	Jerome Williams (6-7)	Dan Otero (8-2)	Ken Giles (1)	31,848	84-70
155	September 21	Phillies	8-6	Sean Doolittle (2-4)	Miguel Alfredo González (0-1)	–	25,126	85-70
156	September 22	Angels	8-4	Jeff Samardzija (5-5)	C. J. Wilson (13-10)	–	25,455	86-70
157	September 23	Angels	0-2	Wade LeBlanc (1–1)	Sonny Gray (13–10)	Huston Street (40)	27,588	86-71
158	September 24	Angels	4-5	Hector Santiago (6–9)	Jon Lester (16–11)	Huston Street (41)	27,989	86-72
159	September 25	@ Rangers	1-2	Neftalí Feliz (2–1)	Luke Gregerson (5–5)		33,696	86-73
160	September 26	@ Rangers	6-2	Scott Kazmir (15–9)	Nick Tepesch (5–11)		31,586	87-73
161	September 27	@ Rangers	4-5	Spencer Patton (1–0)	Jeff Samardzija (7–13)	Neftalí Feliz	35,326	87-74
162	September 28	@ Rangers	4-0	Sonny Gray (14–10)	Nick Martinez (5–12)		36,381	88-74

== Player stats ==
=== Batting ===
Note: G = Games played; AB = At bats; R = Runs; H = Hits; 2B = Doubles; 3B = Triples; HR = Home runs; RBI = Runs batted in; SB = Stolen bases; BB = Walks; AVG = Batting average; SLG = Slugging average

Player	G	AB	R	H	2B	3B	HR	RBI	SB	BB	AVG	SLG
Josh Donaldson	158	608	93	155	31	2	29	98	8	76	.255	.456
Jed Lowrie	136	502	59	125	29	3	6	50	0	51	.249	.355
Brandon Moss	147	500	70	117	23	2	25	81	1	67	.234	.438
Coco Crisp	126	463	68	114	21	3	9	47	19	66	.246	.363
Alberto Callaspo	127	404	37	90	15	0	4	39	0	40	.223	.290
Yoenis Céspedes	101	399	62	102	26	3	17	67	3	28	.256	.464
Derek Norris	127	385	46	104	19	1	10	55	2	54	.270	.403
Josh Reddick	109	363	53	96	16	7	12	54	1	28	.264	.446
John Jaso	99	307	42	81	18	3	9	40	2	28	.264	.430
Eric Sogard	117	291	38	65	10	0	1	22	11	31	.223	.268
Stephen Vogt	84	269	26	75	10	2	9	35	1	16	.279	.431
Craig Gentry	94	232	38	59	6	1	0	12	20	17	.254	.289
Nick Punto	73	198	21	41	7	2	2	14	3	25	.207	.293
Sam Fuld	60	187	25	39	6	4	3	19	9	17	.209	.332
Nate Freiman	36	87	12	19	5	0	5	15	0	5	.218	.448
Adam Dunn	25	66	6	14	1	0	2	10	0	6	.212	.318
Jonny Gomes	34	64	6	15	1	0	0	5	0	9	.234	.250
Daric Barton	30	57	7	9	1	0	0	5	0	5	.158	.175
Andy Parrino	21	46	4	7	3	0	1	3	0	3	.152	.283
Kyle Blanks	21	45	9	15	1	0	2	7	0	8	.333	.489
Geovany Soto	14	42	3	11	4	0	0	8	0	6	.262	.357
Billy Burns	13	6	4	1	0	0	0	0	3	0	.167	.167
Bryan Anderson	1	1	0	0	0	0	0	0	0	0	.000	.000
Pitcher totals	162	23	0	0	0	0	0	0	0	0	.000	.000
Team totals	162	5545	729	1354	253	33	146	686	83	586	.244	.381

=== Pitching ===
Note: W = Wins; L = Losses; ERA = Earned run average; G = Games pitched; GS = Games started; SV = Saves; IP = Innings pitched; H = Hits allowed; R = Runs allowed; ER = Earned runs allowed; SO = Strikeouts

Player	W	L	ERA	G	GS	SV	IP	H	R	ER	BB	SO
Sonny Gray	14	10	3.08	33	33	0	219.0	187	84	75	74	183
Scott Kazmir	15	9	3.55	32	32	0	190.1	171	81	75	50	164
Jesse Chavez	8	8	3.45	32	21	0	146.0	142	64	56	49	136
Jeff Samardzija	5	6	3.14	16	16	0	111.2	92	42	39	12	99
Tommy Milone	6	3	3.55	16	16	0	96.1	91	42	38	26	61
Dan Otero	8	2	2.28	72	0	1	86.2	80	24	22	15	45
Jon Lester	6	4	2.35	11	11	0	76.2	66	24	20	16	71
Luke Gregerson	5	5	2.12	72	0	3	72.1	58	20	17	15	59
Drew Pomeranz	5	4	2.35	20	10	0	69.0	51	22	18	26	64
Jason Hammel	2	6	4.26	13	12	0	67.2	66	34	32	21	54
Sean Doolittle	2	4	2.73	61	0	22	62.2	38	19	19	8	89
Fernando Abad	2	4	1.57	69	0	0	57.1	34	11	10	15	51
Ryan Cook	1	3	3.42	54	0	1	50.0	32	19	19	22	50
Jim Johnson	4	2	7.14	38	0	2	40.1	60	33	32	23	28
Dan Straily	1	2	4.93	7	7	0	38.1	33	21	21	15	34
Eric O'Flaherty	1	0	2.25	21	0	1	20.0	15	5	5	4	15
Brad Mills	1	1	4.41	3	3	0	16.1	19	9	8	7	14
Jeff Francis	0	1	6.08	9	0	1	13.1	11	9	9	3	10
Evan Scribner	1	0	4.63	13	0	0	11.2	11	6	6	0	11
Fernando Rodriguez	1	0	1.00	7	0	0	9.0	4	1	1	2	4
Josh Lindblom	0	0	3.86	1	1	0	4.2	5	2	2	2	2
Joe Savery	0	0	0.00	3	0	0	4.0	3	0	0	1	0
Team totals	88	74	3.22	162	162	31	1463.1	1269	572	524	406	1244

== Post-season ==
=== Wild Card Game ===
The 2014 American League Wild Card game took place on September 30, 2014, at Kauffman Stadium in Kansas City, Missouri. The Oakland Athletics took on the Kansas City Royals. Oakland went out to an early lead after a first inning 2-run home run from Brandon Moss, scoring Coco Crisp. Kansas City responded in the bottom half of the inning, and trimmed Oakland's Lead to 1 after a Billy Butler single, scoring Nori Aoki. The Royals later took the lead in the 3rd inning, following two RBI singles from Lorenzo Cain, and Eric Hosmer. In the top of the 6th inning, Brandon Moss hit his second homerun of the game, which scored Sam Fuld and Josh Donaldson. Followed by RBI singles from Derek Norris and Coco Crisp, making the score 7-3 Oakland after 6 innings. The Royals then scored 3 more runs in the bottom of the 8th inning, making the score 7-6. Kansas City would later tie the game in the bottom of the 9th using their well documented "small ball" techniques, and scored from an Aoki sacrifice fly, sending the game to extra innings. Both teams remained scoreless until the top of the 12th, where Alberto Callaspo scored Josh Reddick on a single to left field, which put the Athletics up 8-7. In the bottom of the 12th Kansas city rallied back, and tied the game on an infield single, and later won the game in walk-off fashion on a Salvador Pérez single down the 3rd base line. The 2014 AL Wild Card playoff game became the longest game in the history of the MLB wild card. The Royals would later continue their hot streak, and found themselves in the 2014 World Series, where they later lost to the San Francisco Giants.

=== Postseason game log ===
2014 Postseason Game Log
Total: 0-1 (Home: 0-0; Away: 0-1)
AL Wild Card Game vs. Kansas City Royals

#	Date	Opponent / Time	Score	Win	Loss	Save	Attendance	Series
1	September 30	@ Royals	8–9 (12)	Frasor (1–0)	Otero (0–1)	–	40,502	0–1

== Roster ==
2014 Oakland Athletics
Roster
Pitchers: 56 Fernando Abad; 60 Jesse Chavez; 48 Ryan Cook; 62 Sean Doolittle; 29 Jeff Francis; 54 Sonny Gray; 44 Luke Gregerson; 40 Jason Hammel; 45 Jim Johnson; 26 Scott Kazmir; 31 Jon Lester; 25 Josh Lindblom; 49 Brad Mills; 57 Tommy Milone; 39 Eric O'Flaherty; 61 Dan Otero; 13 Drew Pomeranz; 33 Fernando Rodriguez; 29 Jeff Samardzija; 50 Joe Savery; 58 Evan Scribner; 67 Dan Straily	Catchers: 5 John Jaso; 36 Derek Norris; 17 Geovany Soto; Infielders: 10 Daric Barton; 88 Kyle Blanks; 18,7 Alberto Callaspo; 20 Josh Donaldson; 35 Nate Freiman; 8 Jed Lowrie; 37 Brandon Moss; 12 Andy Parrino; 1 Nick Punto; 28 Eric Sogard; 21 Stephen Vogt	Outfielders: 19 Billy Burns; 52 Yoenis Céspedes; 4 Coco Crisp; 29,23 Sam Fuld; 3 Craig Gentry; 15 Jonny Gomes; 16 Josh Reddick; Other batters: 45 Bryan Anderson; 10 Adam Dunn	Manager: 6 Bob Melvin; Coaches: 51 Darren Bush (bullpen); 30 Chili Davis (hitting); 2 Mike Gallego (third base); 14 Chip Hale (bench); 59 Ariel Prieto (coach); 46 Tye Waller (first base); 41 Curt Young (pitching)

== All-stars ==
The following players represented the Athletics at the 2014 Major League Baseball All-Star Game:

- 3B Josh Donaldson
- C Derek Norris
- 1B Brandon Moss
- OF Yoenis Céspedes
- LHP Sean Doolittle
- LHP Scott Kazmir

== Farm system ==
Level	Team	League	Manager
AAA	Sacramento River Cats	Pacific Coast League	Steve Scarsone
AA	Midland RockHounds	Texas League	Aaron Nieckula
A	Stockton Ports	California League	Ryan Christenson
A	Beloit Snappers	Midwest League	Rick Magnante
A-Short Season	Vermont Lake Monsters	New York–Penn League	David Newhan
Rookie	AZL Athletics	Arizona League	Ruben Escalera

LEAGUE CHAMPIONS: Midland
