= Jon Lester =

American baseball player (born 1984)

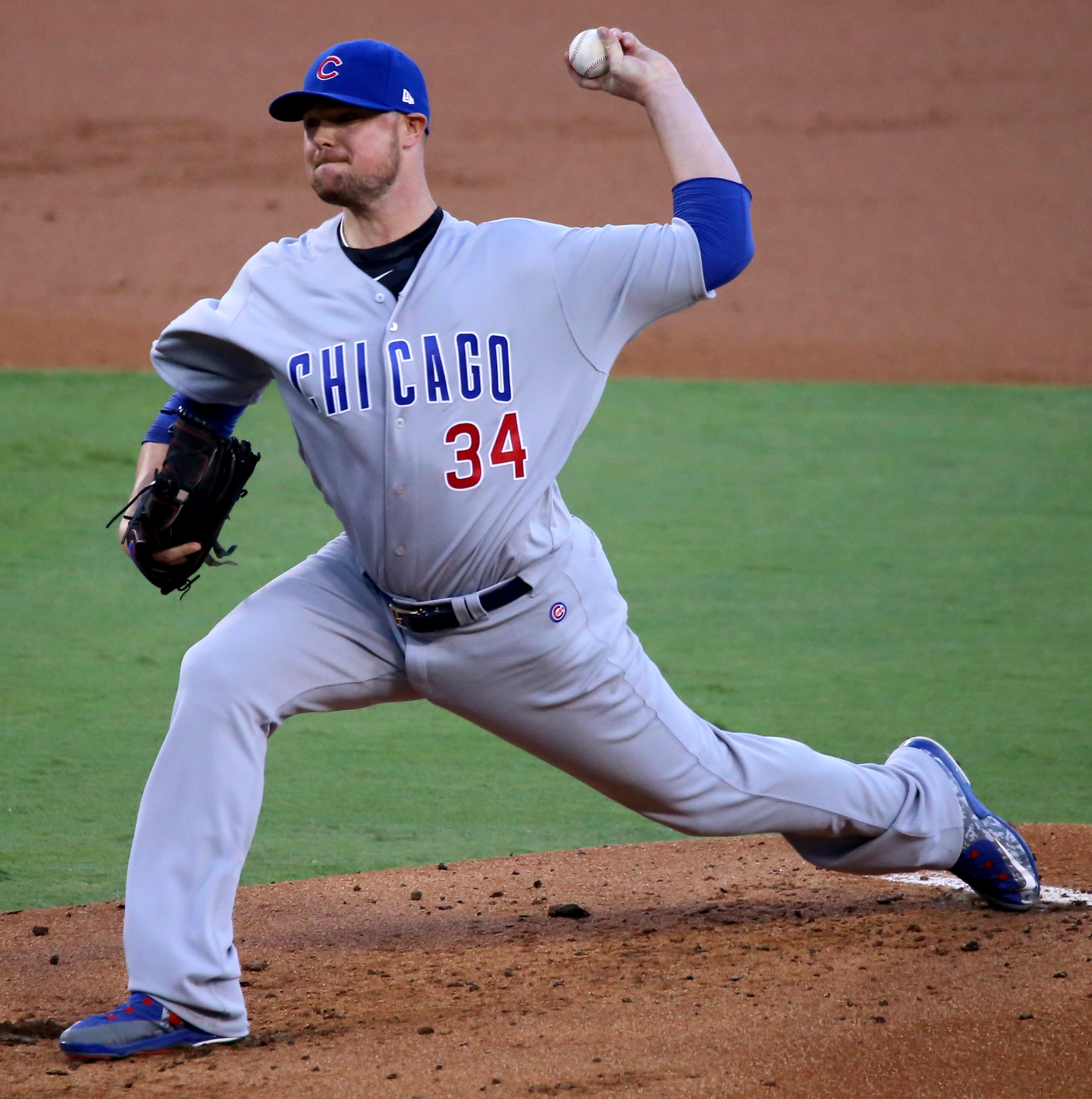
- Lester with the Chicago Cubs in 2016
- Pitcher
- Born: January 7, 1984 (age 42); Tacoma, Washington, U.S.
- Batted: Left Threw: Left

MLB debut
- June 10, 2006, for the Boston Red Sox

Last MLB appearance
- October 2, 2021, for the St. Louis Cardinals

MLB statistics
- Win–loss record: 200–117
- Earned run average: 3.66
- Strikeouts: 2,488
- Stats at Baseball Reference

Teams
- Boston Red Sox (2006–2014); Oakland Athletics (2014); Chicago Cubs (2015–2020); Washington Nationals (2021); St. Louis Cardinals (2021)

Career highlights and awards
- 5× All-Star (2010, 2011, 2014, 2016, 2018); 3× World Series champion (2007, 2013, 2016); NLCS MVP (2016); NL wins leader (2018); Pitched a no-hitter on May 19, 2008; Boston Red Sox Hall of Fame; Chicago Cubs Hall of Fame

Jonathan Tyler Lester (born January 7, 1984) is an American former professional baseball pitcher. He played in Major League Baseball (MLB) for the Boston Red Sox, Oakland Athletics, Chicago Cubs, Washington Nationals, and St. Louis Cardinals. Less than two years after being diagnosed with lymphoma, Lester started and won the final game of the 2007 World Series for the Red Sox and, in May 2008, pitched a no-hitter against the Kansas City Royals. He helped lead the Red Sox to another championship in 2013, and he won the 2016 World Series with the Cubs. Lester started the opening game of a playoff series 12 times, which was a record for the most in baseball history until Justin Verlander passed him in 2023.

== Early life ==
Lester attended Bellarmine Preparatory School in Tacoma, Washington. Playing for the school's baseball team, Lester was a three-time MVP and three-time All-Area selection. In addition, he was named Gatorade State Player of the Year for Washington in 2000.

== Professional career ==
=== Draft and minor leagues ===
The Red Sox selected Lester in the second round, with the 57th overall selection, of the 2002 Major League Baseball draft and gave him the highest signing bonus of any second-rounder that year, $1 million.

Lester quickly moved through the Red Sox organization, posting an 11–7 win–loss record, a league-leading 2.61 earned run average (ERA) and a league-best 163 strikeouts for the Portland Sea Dogs of the Class AA Eastern League in 2005. He was named the Eastern League Pitcher of the Year and Red Sox Minor League Pitcher of the Year and was selected as the left-handed pitcher on the Eastern League's year-end All-Star team and on the year-end Topps Class AA All-Star squad.

Lester was one of the Red Sox' top-rated prospects while in the minors, and other major league teams made efforts to acquire him. The Texas Rangers had demanded Lester be part of the proposed but ultimately rejected deal before the 2004 season for Alex Rodriguez. The Florida Marlins insisted he be included in the trade for Josh Beckett before the 2006 season, but again, the Sox were able to keep Lester.

=== Boston Red Sox (2006–2014) ===
==== 2006 ====
With a rash of injuries and general ineffectiveness of several Red Sox starters, the team recalled Lester on June 10 to make his major league debut against the Texas Rangers. He put up a 7–2 record and a 4.76 ERA in 81 1/3 innings pitched in his rookie year.

On August 27, 2006, Lester was scratched from his scheduled start against the Oakland Athletics due to a sore back. The following day he was placed on the 15-day disabled list, and was sent back to Boston for testing. At the time, Lester's back problems were thought to be the result of a car crash he was involved in earlier in the month. On August 31, it was reported that Lester had been diagnosed with enlarged lymph nodes and was being tested for a variety of ailments, including forms of cancer. A few days later, doctors at Massachusetts General Hospital confirmed that Lester had a treatable form of anaplastic large cell lymphoma. Lester underwent off-season chemotherapy treatments at Seattle's Fred Hutchinson Cancer Research Center. In December 2006, ESPN.com reported that Lester's latest CT Scan showed no signs of the disease, which appeared to be in remission.

==== 2007 ====
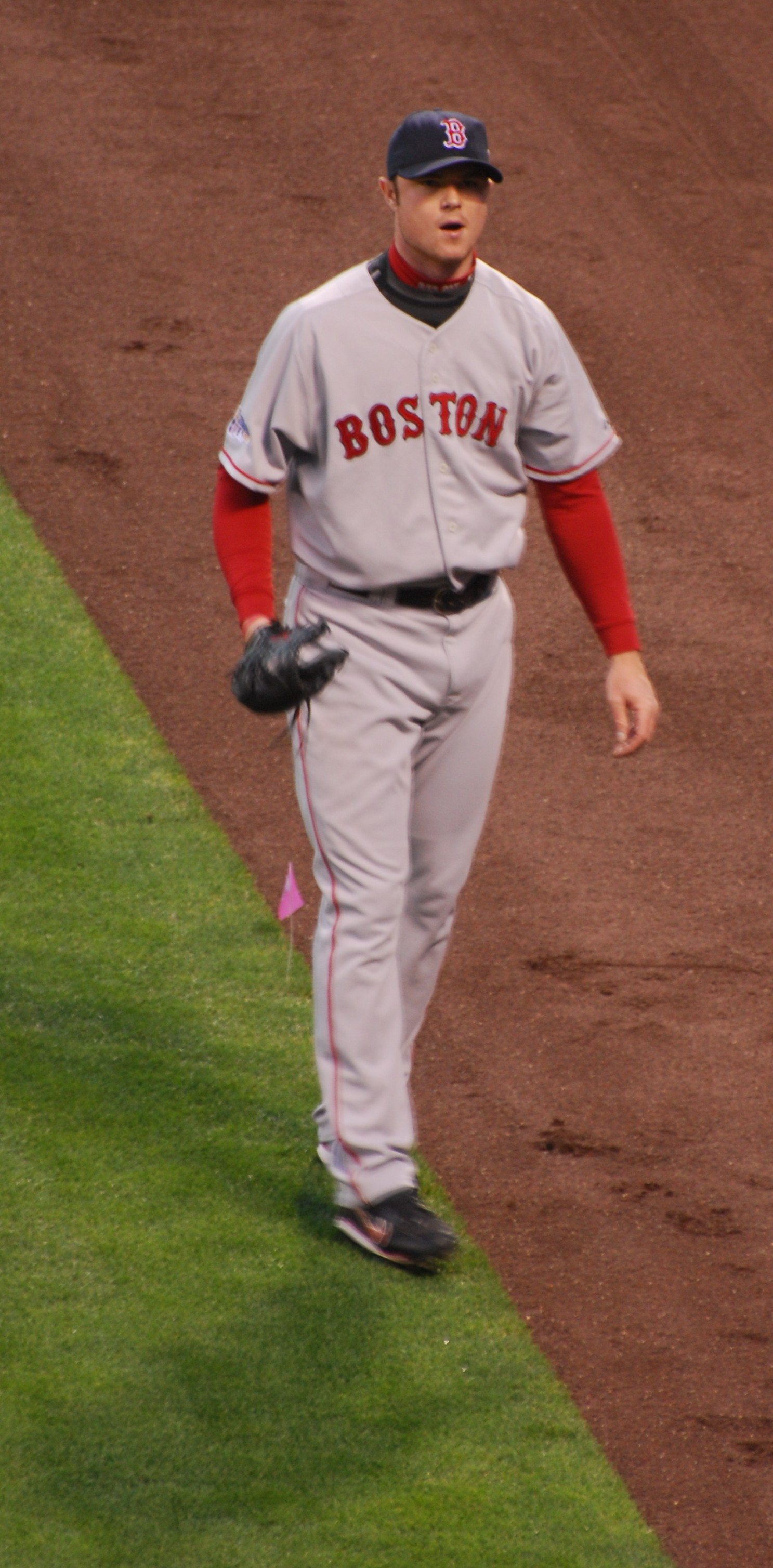
Lester before Game 4 of the 2007 World Series

Following the successful treatment of his lymphoma, Lester was able to return to the Red Sox midway through the 2007 season. Lester attended spring training in 2007, and started the season for the class A Greenville Drive. Lester then started for Triple-A Pawtucket Red Sox in late April 2007. In June, Lester was removed from the disabled list, and sent to Pawtucket for further rehab outings.

Lester made his first 2007 start for the Boston Red Sox on July 23 against the Cleveland Indians at Jacobs Field in Cleveland, pitching six innings, allowing two runs on five hits and struck out six, picking up the win. On September 26 against the Oakland Athletics at Fenway Park, Lester gave up what would turn out to be the final career home run by Hall of Fame catcher Mike Piazza. In the 2007 World Series against the Colorado Rockies, Lester won the series-clinching Game 4 for the Red Sox, pitching 5 2/3 shutout innings, giving up three hits and three walks while collecting three strikeouts. Lester became the third pitcher in World Series history to win a series clinching game in his first post-season start.

To honor Lester's comeback from lymphoma, the Boston Baseball Writers' Association of America voted him the 2007 Tony Conigliaro Award.

==== 2008 ====
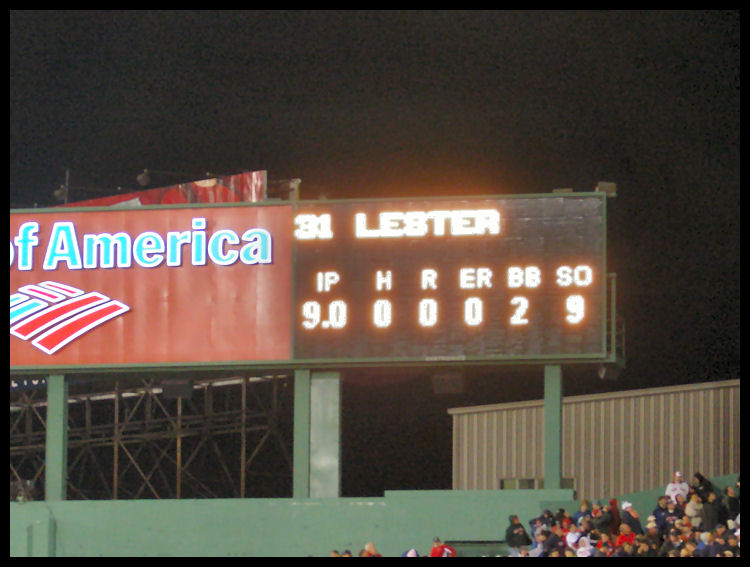
The line score inside Fenway Park following Jon Lester's no-hitter, May 19, 2008

On May 19, 2008, Lester threw a no-hitter in a 7–0 win against the Kansas City Royals. It was the 18th no-hitter in Red Sox history. Lester threw 130 pitches in the game, allowing only two walks and striking out nine batters, and was charged with a throwing error on a pickoff attempt in the second inning. It was the first no-hitter thrown by a Red Sox left-handed pitcher since Mel Parnell in 1956, the first in MLB since teammate Clay Buchholz in September 2007, and the MLB-record fourth no-hitter caught by Jason Varitek. It was also only the second no-hitter ever pitched against the Royals; Nolan Ryan pitched the other in 1973.

In 2008, Lester went 16–6 with a 3.21 ERA. Along with his no-hitter, he pitched a five-hit shutout in his first start at Yankee Stadium. He was named the AL Pitcher of the Month in July and September. Lester was also a key figure in the Red Sox' victory over the Angels in the American League Divisional Series, pitching 14 innings without allowing an earned run. Lester had the second highest winning percentage of all starting pitchers over the last three years (27–8, .771), and led the Red Sox in innings pitched in 2008 with 210 1/3.

Lester's losses in Games 3 and 7 of the 2008 ALCS were the first losses he had ever had in consecutive starts.

Lester also received the 2008 Hutch Award, given to the Major League player who "best exemplifies the fighting spirit and competitive desire" of Hutchinson.

==== 2009 ====
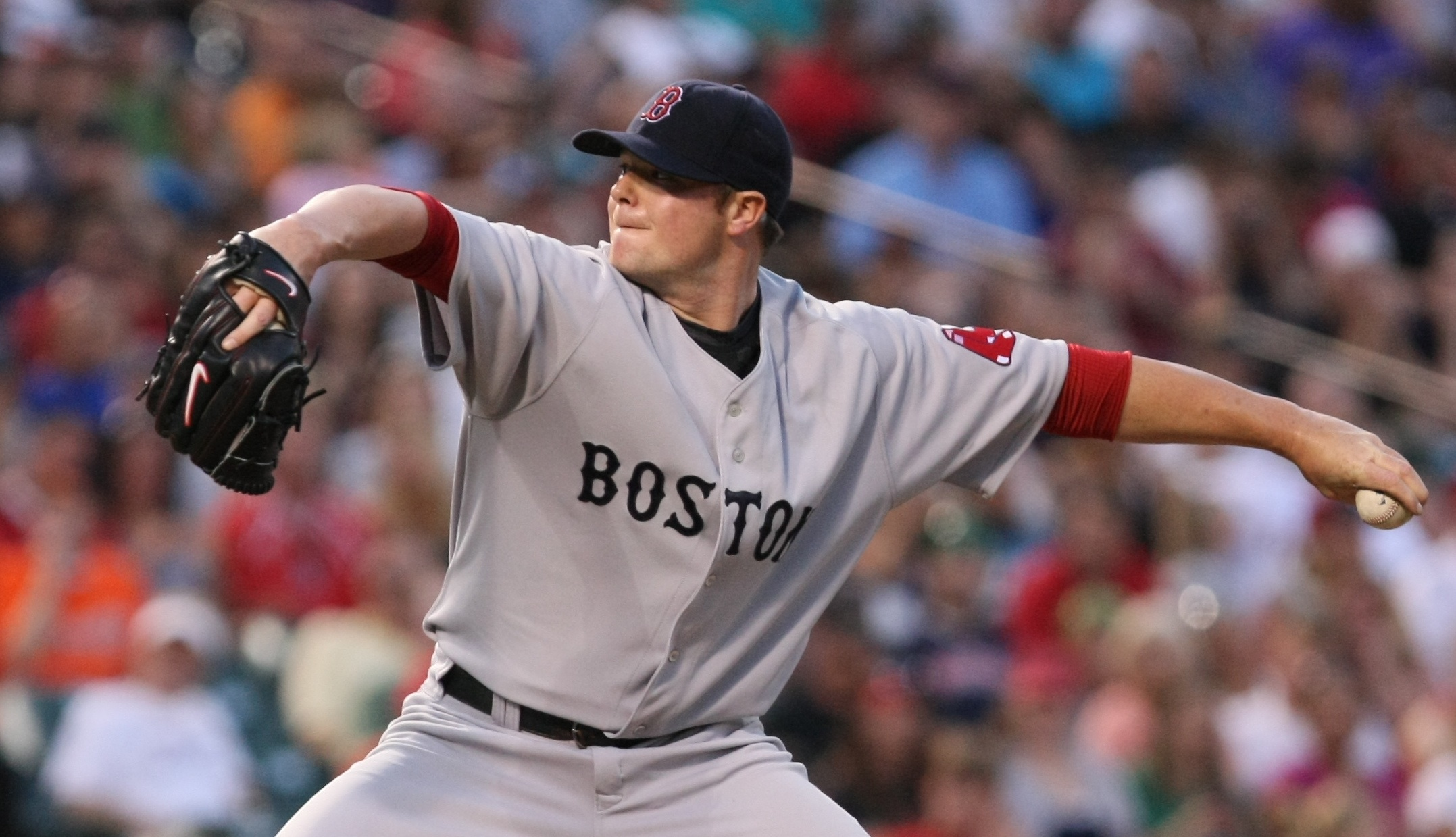
Lester pitching for the Red Sox in 2009

On March 8, Lester agreed to a five-year, $30 million contract extension with a $14 million team option in 2014.

The season started poorly, with him allowing 11 runs and getting losses in his first two starts. This was the first time he lost in consecutive regular season starts. He began to pitch very well in late May, going 12–3 with a 2.31 ERA in his final 22 starts. On June 6, Lester made his bid for a second no-hitter against the AL West-leading Texas Rangers at Fenway. He pitched 6 1/3 perfect innings, striking out 10 batters on 61 pitches through the first six innings. Michael Young hit a one-out double to left center field in the seventh inning to break up the no-hitter, but Lester pitched a complete game, striking out a total of 11 batters, giving him 23 strikeouts in two starts (he had a career-best 12 strikeouts his previous start). On August 14, Lester struck out ten batters for the sixth time in the 2009 season, the most times ever by a Red Sox left-handed pitcher. He had never done it before that season. Lester started 32 games in 2009, going 15–8 with a 3.41 ERA.

Lester started Game 1 of the 2009 ALDS against the Los Angeles Angels of Anaheim, but the Red Sox lost the game 5–0 and would eventually be swept in the series.

==== 2010 ====
In 2010, Lester won his final start in April, then won five of the six games he started in May. Lester went 5–0 with a 1.84 ERA and 45 strikeouts and was named the American League Pitcher of the Month, winning the award for the third time.

On June 16, he got his 50th career win, against the Arizona Diamondbacks. Lester was selected to the American League All-Star team on July 1, this was his first selection. At the time of the break he was 11–3 with a 2.78 ERA and 124 strikeouts. He pitched the sixth inning for the AL allowing no baserunners.

On July 25, Lester took a perfect game into the sixth inning against the Seattle Mariners, but lost it in that inning due to an error made by Eric Patterson. A home run by Michael Saunders broke up the no-hit bid, and the Red Sox eventually lost the game. The loss was the second of four losses in a row Lester took after the All-Star break. He would eventually turn it around throwing six shutout innings against the Yankees and then eight shutout innings, despite feeling sick, against the Rangers. Lester finished the season strong and developed an excellent pickoff move, but fell just short of 20 wins.

Lester finished the season T-4th in wins (19) and in fourth place in strikeouts (225) in the Majors (AL and NL combined) in 2010. He finished 25th in the Major Leagues with a 3.25 ERA in an above average year for pitchers. Lester finished fourth in voting for the 2010 AL Cy Young Award as well.

==== 2011 ====
In 2011, Lester was the opening day starter for the Red Sox, on the road against Texas. He had a solid season, leading Boston's rotation in wins for the second year in a row and strikeouts for the third year in a row. He was named to the American League All-Star team, replacing Félix Hernández, but did not pitch due to a lat injury.

Lester struggled along with the rest of the team, losing his last three decisions, including giving up eight runs in a start against the New York Yankees. He pitched the season finale against the Baltimore Orioles, pitching six innings and giving up just two runs. The bullpen was unable to hold onto the lead, and the Red Sox were eliminated. Lester finished the season 15–9 with a 3.41 ERA. He finished in the top 20 in strikeouts (11th), wins (10th) and ERA (17th).

In the end of the 2011 season, Lester, Josh Beckett, and John Lackey were at the center of a controversy about players drinking alcohol during games. Many people hypothesized that this was part of the reason why the Red Sox went 7–20 in September and were eliminated on the last day of the season. Lester later admitted that he and teammates occasionally drank during off-days.

==== 2012 ====
In 2012, Lester was again the opening day starter for the Red Sox. Lester had a disappointing season, posting a 9–14 record, a sub-par 4.82 ERA, and a .273 batting average against.

==== 2013 ====
On May 10, 2013, Lester threw a complete game one-hitter, with no walks, against the Toronto Blue Jays, facing just 28 batters.

On October 3, 2013, Lester was named as the starting pitcher for Game 1 of the 2013 ALDS against the Tampa Bay Rays in Boston's first return to the postseason since 2009. The following day, Lester pitched 7 2/3 innings with three walks and striking out seven, and the Red Sox won 12–2 (and later went on to win the series 3–1). Lester also tied Josh Beckett's Red Sox postseason record of striking out the first four batters to begin the game. Lester started Game 1 of the 2013 ALCS against the Detroit Tigers on October 12, 2013. He pitched 6 1/3 innings with four strikeouts and allowed one run, but was outmatched by a one-hit game put together by the Tigers' pitching staff led by starter Aníbal Sánchez. At Comerica Park on October 17, 2013, Lester again faced Sanchez in Game 5. The Red Sox won 4–3 with Lester pitching five innings and showing spectacular defensive skills in the fifth inning throwing out former teammate Jose Iglesias with a glove flip to first base on a bunt attempt.

After the Red Sox victory in the ALCS, Lester was selected to start Game 1 of the 2013 World Series against the St. Louis Cardinals. Lester pitched to an 8–1 victory over St. Louis starter Adam Wainwright. Lester then went on to a Game 5 win again over Wainwright giving the Red Sox a series lead of 3–2. The Red Sox won the series in six games.

==== 2014 ====
On May 3, 2014, Lester pitched eight one-hit innings against the Oakland Athletics, where he had a career-high 15 strikeouts. It was the most by a Red Sox pitcher since Josh Beckett in 2010.

He was elected to his third All-Star Game in July 2014 after posting a 2.73 ERA over his first 18 starts of the season.

=== Oakland Athletics (2014) ===
On July 31, 2014, Lester and Jonny Gomes were traded to the Oakland Athletics for Yoenis Céspedes and a competitive round 2015 draft pick. The move reunited Lester with former teammates Jed Lowrie, Coco Crisp, Brandon Moss and Josh Reddick. He won his debut start against the Kansas City Royals on August 2. He had a 6–4 record and a 2.35 ERA, while pitching for the A's.

Lester was the starting pitcher for the A's in the Wild Card game, against the Kansas City Royals. He left the game after pitched 7 1/3 innings with the Athletics leading 7–4. Lester, however, received a no decision, as the bullpen blew the lead, and the Royals made a dramatic comeback to win the game in 12 innings.

Lester had a 16–11 record with a 2.46 ERA and finished fourth in the AL Cy Young voting.

=== Chicago Cubs (2015–2020) ===
In December 2014, Lester agreed to a six-year, $155 million deal with the Chicago Cubs with a vesting option for a seventh year at $15 million.

==== 2015 ====
Lester made his first start for the Cubs during opening night on April 5, 2015 against the St. Louis Cardinals. He pitched 4.1 innings allowing 3 runs as the Cubs were shut out by the Cardinals 3–0. He finished the month of April with a record of 0–2 and an ERA of 6.23 in 21.2 innings pitched with 24 strikeouts and five base-on balls.

On May 27, 2015, matchup with the Washington Nationals, Lester hit a fly ball to deep center field that nearly eluded Denard Span. Span caught the fly ball to end the inning, bringing Lester to a record-setting 0-for-58 to start his career. On July 6, 2015, Lester recorded his first career major league hit against John Lackey of the St. Louis Cardinals after starting his career 0-for-66 as a hitter.

Lester posted an 11–13 record, logging 205 innings pitched with an ERA of 3.34 in his first year with the Chicago Cubs. He led the major leagues in stolen bases allowed, with 44.

On October 9, he was the losing pitcher in Game 1 of the NLDS versus the St. Louis Cardinals. On October 17, he took another loss in Game 1 of the NLCS versus the New York Mets.

==== 2016 ====
On July 31, 2016, against the Seattle Mariners, Lester came off the bench in the 12th inning and laid a bunt down to score the winning run. On a 2–2 pitch with one out and Jason Heyward on 3rd, Lester capped off a wild comeback for the Cubs, who rallied back from a 6–0 deficit in the third inning.

In 2016, Lester finished second in the NL with 19 wins, matching his career high. He was also second in ERA (2.44). He led all major league pitchers in left on base percentage, stranding 84.9% of base runners.

Lester started Game 1 of the 2016 NLDS against the San Francisco Giants. He earned the win after tossing eight scoreless innings. The Cubs would go on to win the series in four games.

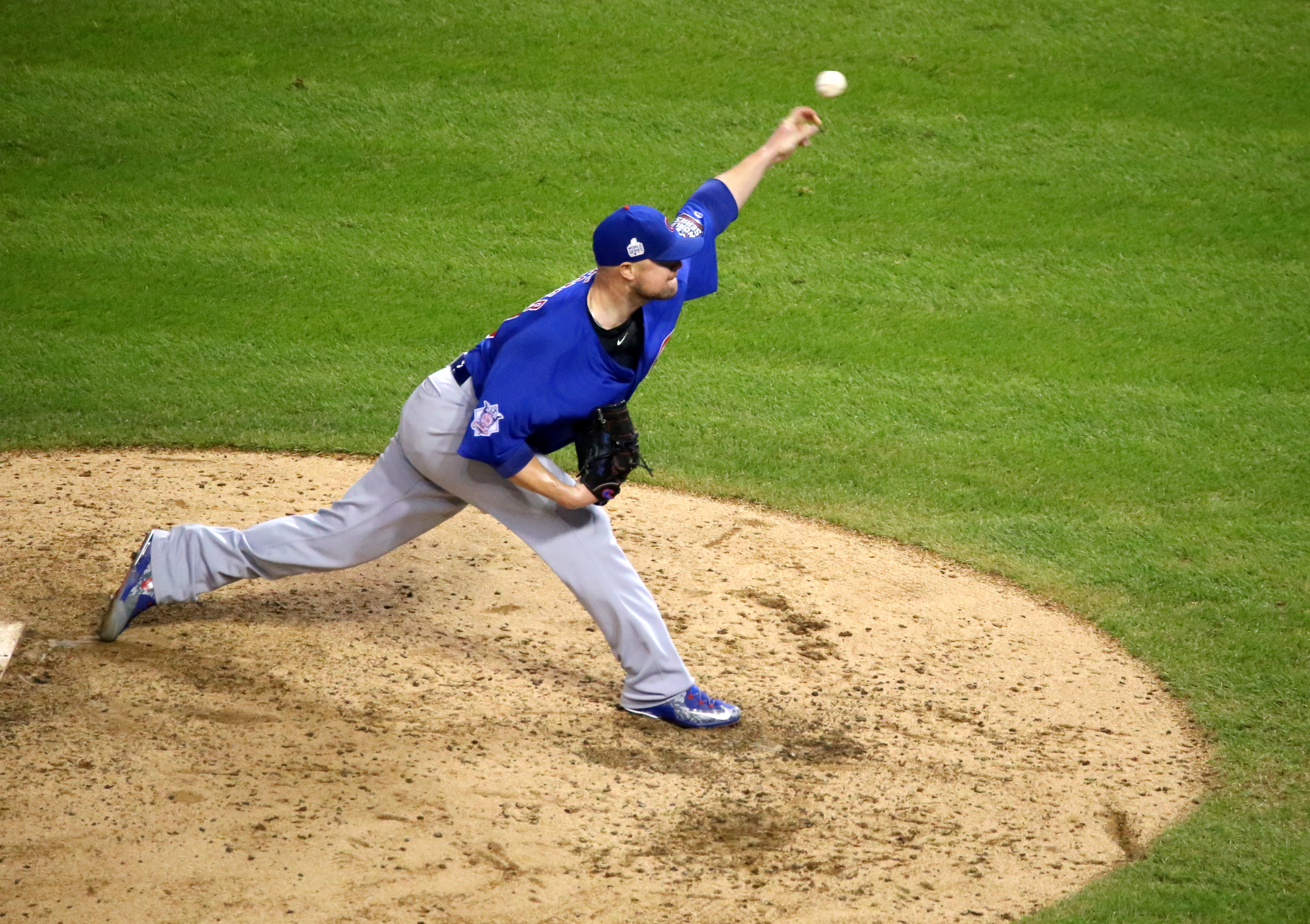
Lester delivers a pitch during Game 7 of the 2016 World Series

Lester also started Game 1 of the 2016 National League Championship Series against the Los Angeles Dodgers, he pitched six innings and allowed just one run and had a no-decision. He also started Game 5 of the series and pitched seven innings of one run ball, earning his third win of the postseason. The Cubs would go on and win the series in six games. Lester was named Co-MVP of the 2016 NLCS along with Javier Báez. Lester's performance helped propel the Cubs to the World Series for the first time since 1945.

Lester was named the Game 1 starter of the 2016 World Series against the Cleveland Indians, where he took the loss after throwing 5.2 innings and allowing three runs. Lester also started Game 5, allowing just two runs in six innings, leading to a 3–2 Cubs victory to extend the series. Lester pitched in relief in Game 7, which the Cubs won, to win their first championship in 108 years. Lester was voted the Babe Ruth award as postseason MVP by the New York chapter of the Baseball Writers' Association of America.

==== 2017 ====
On August 1, Lester recorded his 2,000th career strikeout, and also hit his first career home run. On August 18, Lester was placed on the 10-day disabled list due to left shoulder fatigue.

==== 2018 ====
During spring training, Lester was announced as the Opening Day starter for the Cubs. On July 1, 2018, Lester hit his 2nd career home run, a three-run shot, off of Lance Lynn in an 11–10 win over the Minnesota Twins.

Owning an 11–2 record with a 2.25 ERA, Lester was named to the 2018 MLB All-Star Game, although he was not able to participate and was replaced by Zack Greinke due to the fact that he had pitched on the Sunday before the game. For the season he was 18–6 with a 3.32 ERA.

==== 2019 ====
Lester was named the Opening Day starter for the third consecutive year and the eighth time in his career. He earned the win in a 12–4 Cubs victory against the Texas Rangers. On August 6, 2019, he called himself the "weakest link" in the Cubs rotation after giving up a career high 11 runs in a 11–4 loss to the Oakland Athletics.

==== 2020 ====
Lester endured the worst season of his Cubs career in 2020, finishing with a 3–3 record and 5.16 ERA with 42 strikeouts in 61.0 innings pitched. He became a free agent after the season. In 2026, he was inducted into the team Hall of Fame.

=== Washington Nationals (2021) ===
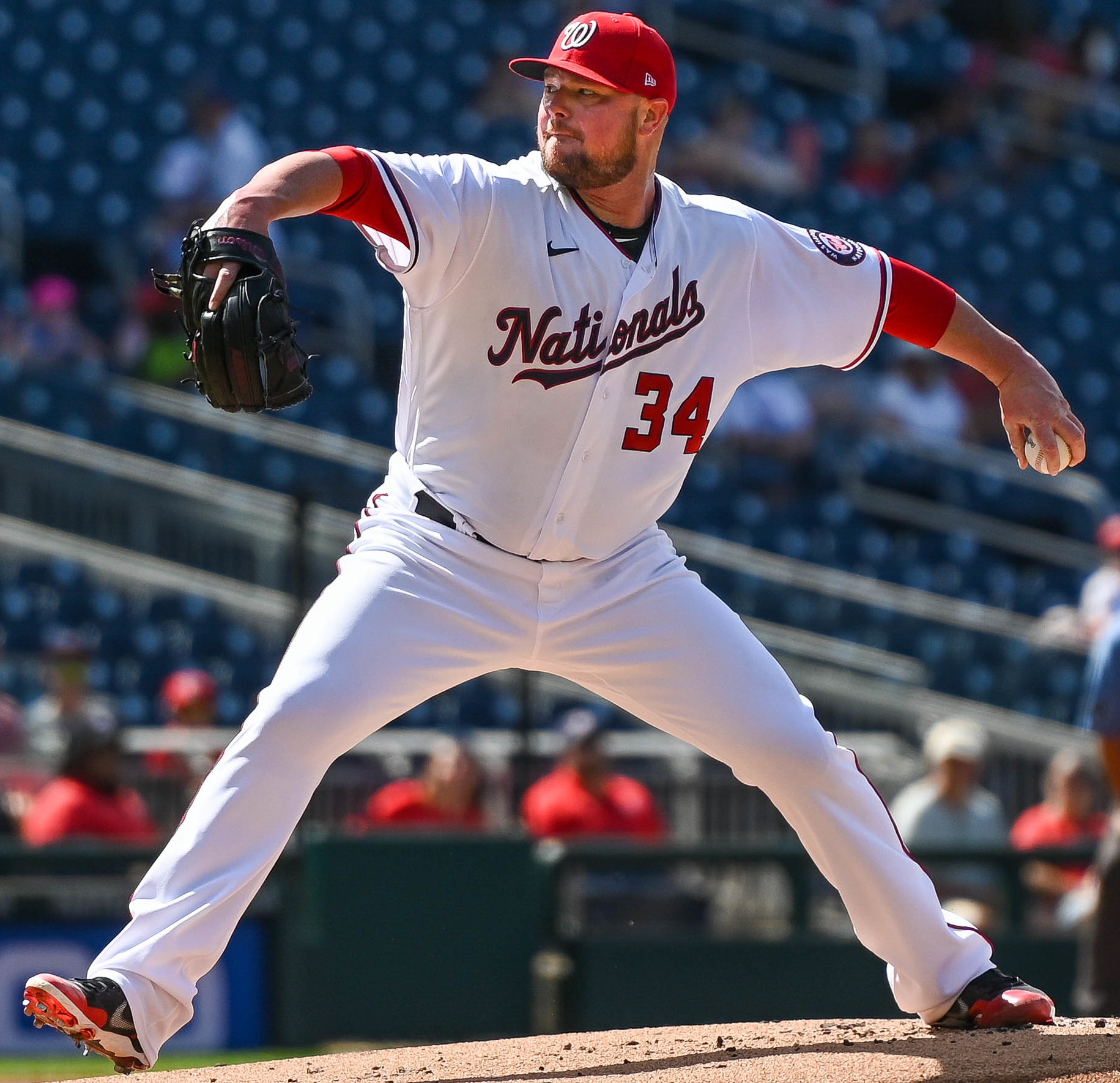
Lester with the Nationals in 2021

On January 27, 2021, Lester signed a one-year, $5 million contract with the Washington Nationals for the 2021 season. He was the first player to wear 34 on the team since Bryce Harper left in 2019.

=== St. Louis Cardinals (2021) ===
On July 30, 2021, Lester was traded to the St. Louis Cardinals in exchange for Lane Thomas. He earned his 200th career victory on September 20, 2021, against the Milwaukee Brewers, making him one of only three active pitchers (at that time) to achieve that mark. Lester made 12 appearances for St. Louis, going 4–1 with a 4.36 ERA and 40 strikeouts. Lester became a free agent following the season.

On January 12, 2022, Lester announced his retirement. At the time of his retirement, he was the last active player from the 2007 Boston Red Sox World Series-winning roster.

== The yips ==
Lester has had well-documented problems throwing the ball to first base, normally a routine task for a professional pitcher. This is a phenomenon known as the yips. In 2015, it was noted that Lester had not attempted a pickoff for more than one year, before making wild throws in his latest attempts. In 2018, it was reported that Lester tried to get around his problems by bouncing his throws to first base.

== Personal life ==
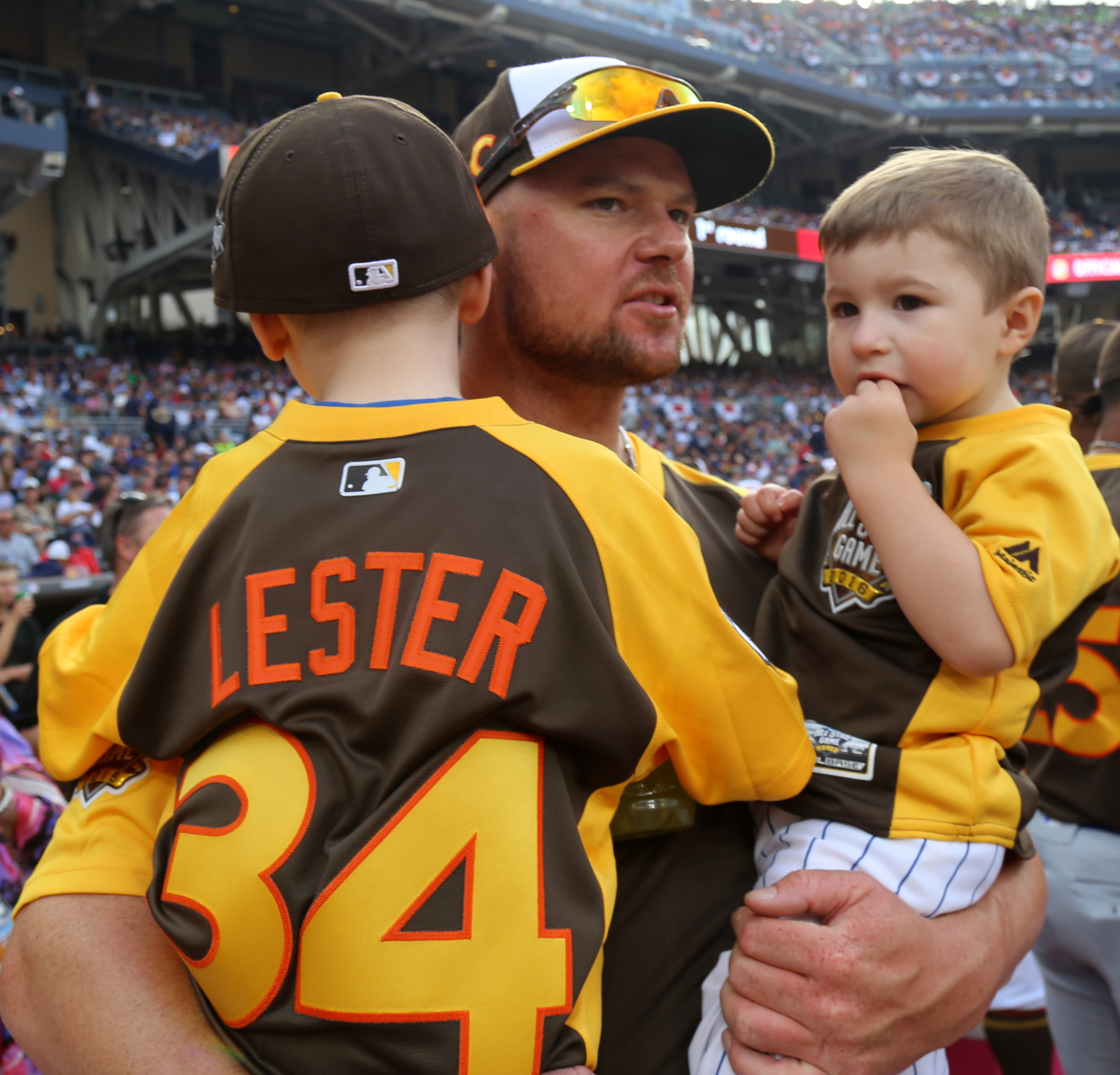
Lester with his sons at the 2016 Home Run Derby

As of June 11, 2019, Forbes estimated that Lester's annual income was $25.3 million.

Lester grew up in Puyallup, Washington and attended All Saints School. He later attended Bellarmine Preparatory School where he was a three-time MVP and three-time All-Area selection. On January 9, 2009, Lester married Farrah Stone Johnson, whom he met in 2007 while making rehab starts in single-A Greenville. Together, they have two sons and one daughter. During the season, they resided in the Graceland West neighborhood of Chicago in a $3.8 million home, but sold it in 2021 after Lester left the Cubs. They reside in the Buckhead neighborhood of Atlanta during the offseason, and Lester owns 1,500 acres in the southwest part of Georgia.

Lester and his wife Farrah established NVRQT, short for "Never Quit", in 2011 to support children with cancer and researchers working towards a cure.

In his free time, Lester is an avid hunter and a wine aficionado. During the 2015 offseason, in an attempt to woo him, the Chicago Cubs sent Lester fine wines and camouflage Cubs shirts.

== See also ==
- Chicago Cubs award winners and league leaders
- List of Boston Red Sox no-hitters
- List of Major League Baseball annual shutout leaders
- List of Major League Baseball career games started leaders
- List of Major League Baseball career strikeout leaders
- List of Major League Baseball career wins leaders
- List of Major League Baseball no-hitters
- List of World Series starting pitchers

Preceded by John Lackey; Cliff Lee	American League Pitcher of the month July 2008; September 2008	Succeeded by Cliff Lee; Zack Greinke
Preceded by Clay Buchholz	No-hitter pitcher May 19, 2008	Succeeded by Carlos Zambrano
