= Dan Otero =

American baseball pitcher (born 1985)

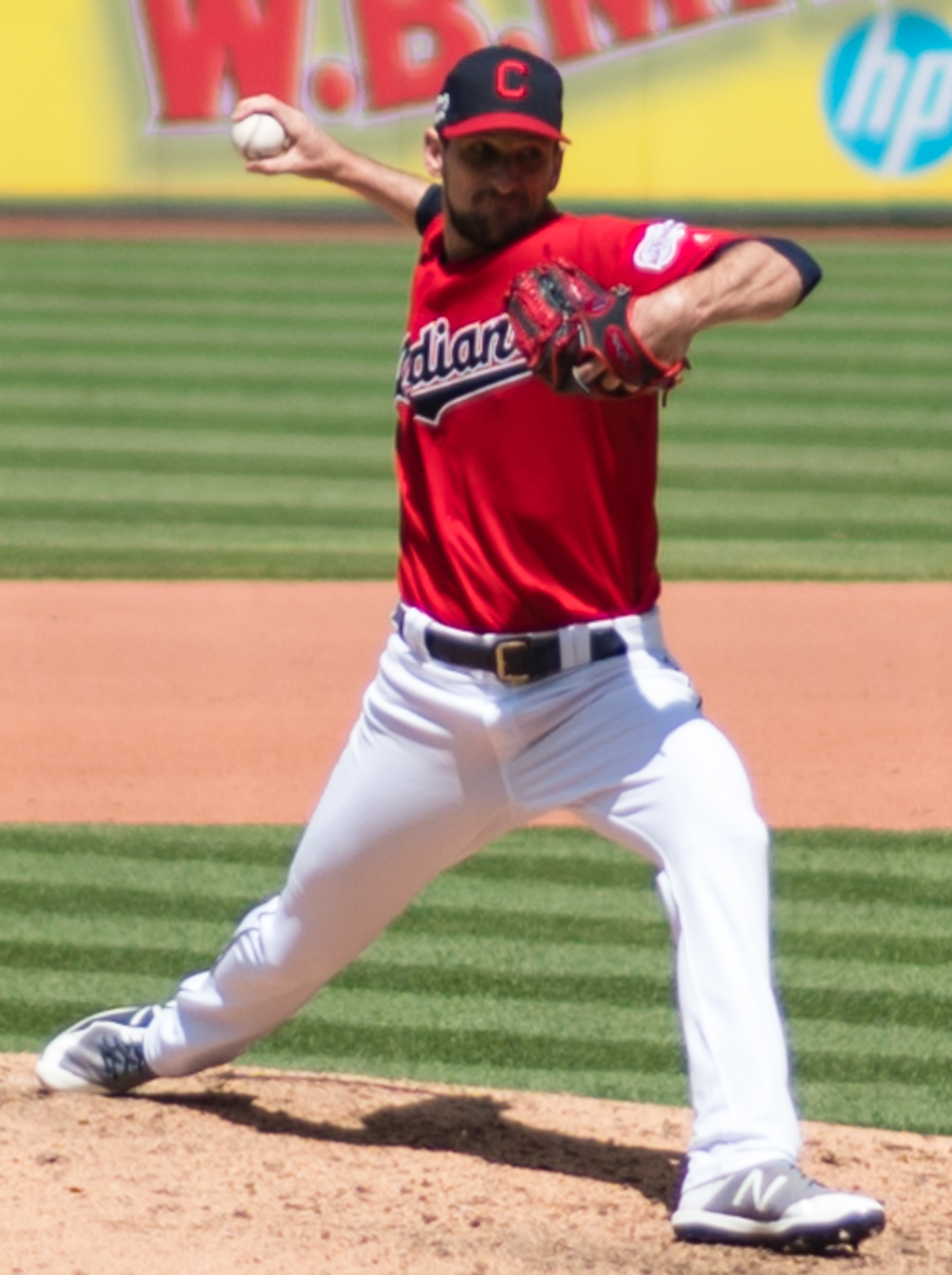
- Otero with the Cleveland Indians in 2019
- Pitcher
- Born: February 19, 1985 (age 40); Miami, Florida, U.S.
- Batted: Right Threw: Right

MLB debut
- April 7, 2012, for the San Francisco Giants

Last MLB appearance
- September 28, 2019, for the Cleveland Indians

MLB statistics
- Win–loss record: 22–8
- Earned run average: 3.39
- Strikeouts: 262
- Stats at Baseball Reference

Teams
- San Francisco Giants (2012); Oakland Athletics (2013–2015); Cleveland Indians (2016–2019)

Daniel Anthony Otero (born February 19, 1985) is an American former professional baseball pitcher. He played in Major League Baseball (MLB) for the San Francisco Giants, Oakland Athletics, and Cleveland Indians.

== Amateur career ==
Otero went to Ransom Everglades High School in Coconut Grove, Florida. He began his college baseball career at Duke University, where he played for the Duke Blue Devils baseball team in the Atlantic Coast Conference from 2004 through 2006. Playing collegiate summer baseball in the summer of 2005, he helped the Newport Gulls win their third New England Collegiate Baseball League championship.

Otero transferred to the University of South Florida (USF), where he played his senior season with the South Florida Bulls baseball team in the Big East Conference.

== Professional career ==
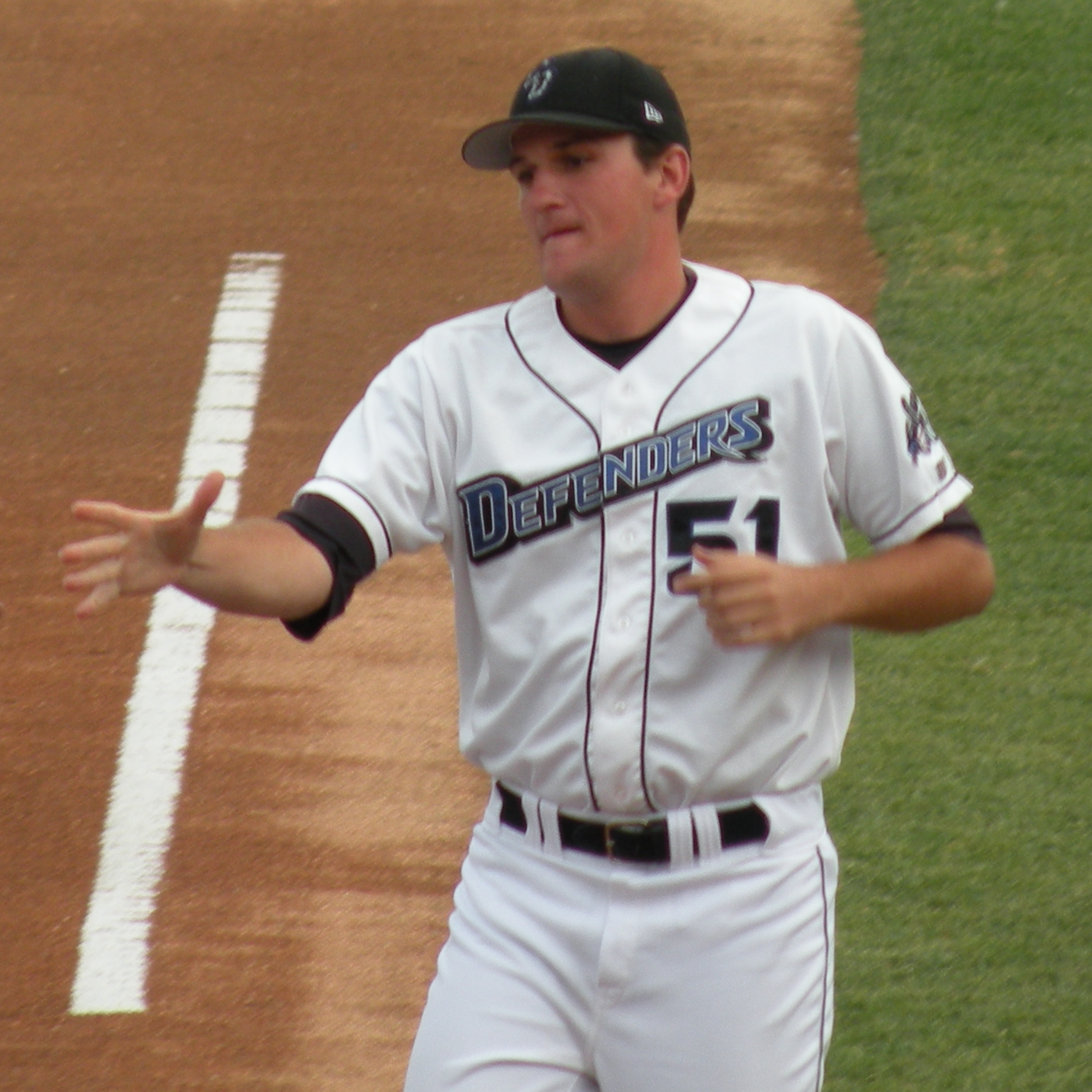
Otero with the Connecticut Defenders in 2009

=== San Francisco Giants ===
The San Francisco Giants drafted Otero out of USF in the 21st round (644th overall) of the 2007 Major League Baseball draft. They added him to the 40 man roster to protect him from the Rule 5 draft after the 2011 season. Otero made the club's Opening Day roster in 2012.

Otero won the 2012 Harry S. Jordan Award, which is given in recognition of the player in his first big league camp whose performance and dedication in Spring Training best exemplifies the Giants' spirit. In his major league debut, on April 7, 2012, Otero recorded his first career major league strikeout against Justin Upton.

=== Oakland Athletics ===
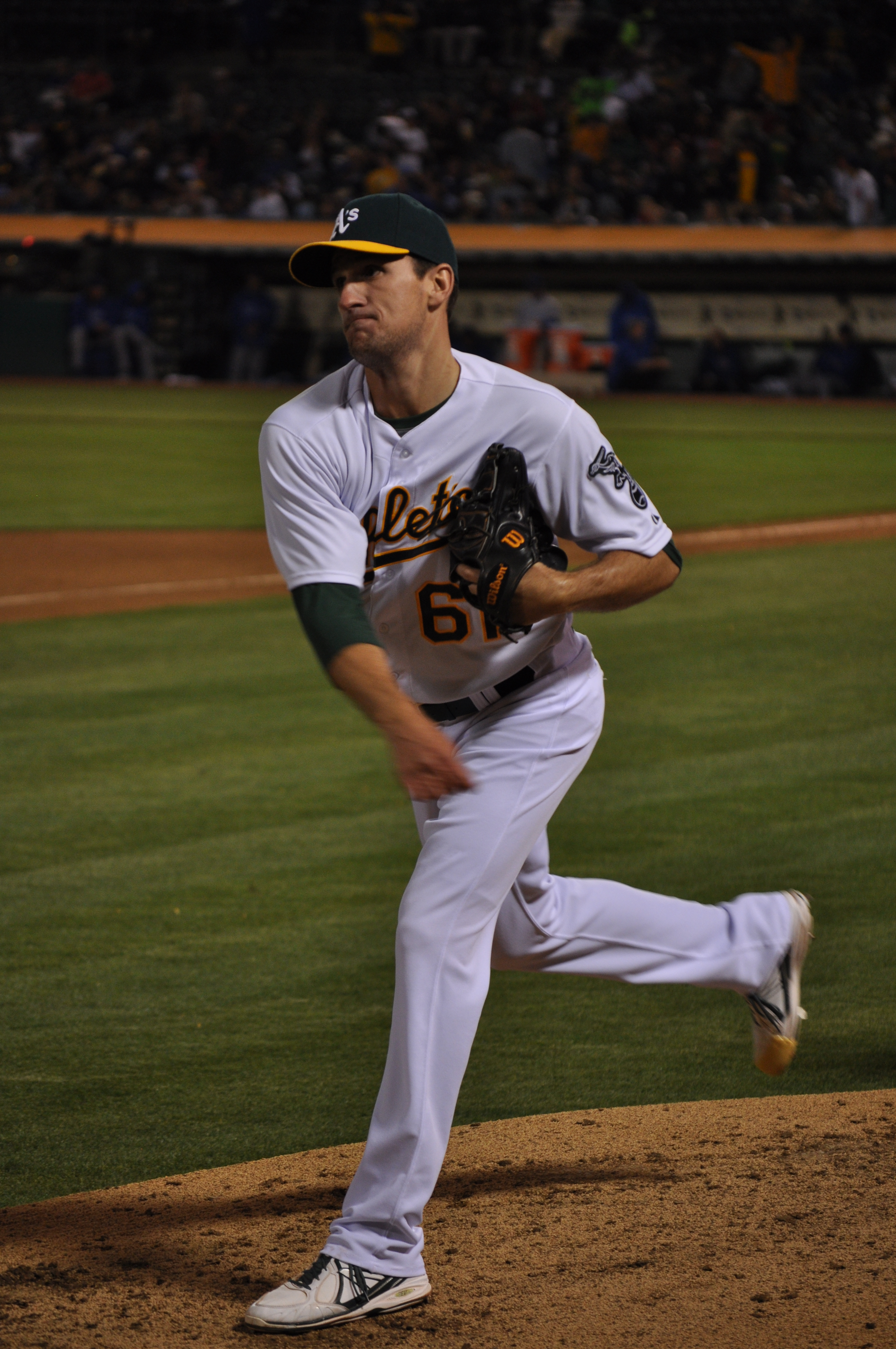
Otero with the Oakland Athletics in 2013

On March 26, 2013, Otero was claimed off waivers by the New York Yankees. The Yankees designated him for assignment the next day. Otero was then claimed off waivers by the Oakland Athletics on March 29, 2013, and immediately optioned to the Triple-A Sacramento River Cats. Otero was designated for assignment after the club acquired Stephen Vogt from the Tampa Bay Rays on April 5, 2013. He was outrighted to Sacramento on April 7.

On June 14, 2013, he was brought up from Sacramento as Hideki Okajima was optioned down. He had his first major-league win in relief of A.J. Griffin on July 2, 2013 against the Chicago Cubs. In 33 games for the A's, he was 2-0 with a 1.38 ERA in 39 innings.

For the 2014 season, Otero served as a mainstay in the A's bullpen, pitching a career high 72 games. He was 8-2 with a 2.28 ERA in 86 2/3 innings. On September 30, 2014, Otero was the losing pitcher in the 2014 American League Wild Card Game, giving up two earned runs in the bottom of the 12th inning. He struggled the following season, appearing in 41 games but having an ERA of 6.75 in 46 2/3 innings.

=== Cleveland Indians ===
On November 3, 2015, Otero was claimed off of waivers by the Philadelphia Phillies. They designated him for assignment on December 11. He was traded to the Cleveland Indians for cash considerations on December 18. In his first season with Cleveland, he rebounded from the previous season, having an ERA of 1.53 in 62 appearances. He had an ERA of 2.85 in 2017. The following season proved to be a difficult one for Otero as he registered an ERA of 5.22 in 61 appearances.

On October 29, 2018, he was selected MLB All-Stars at 2018 MLB Japan All-Star Series.

On October 31, 2019, the Indians announced they had declined their club option on Otero's contract for the 2020 season, making Otero a free agent.

=== New York Yankees ===
Otero signed a minor league contract with the New York Yankees on February 3, 2020. He did not play in a game in 2020 due to the cancellation of the minor league season because of the COVID-19 pandemic. Otero became a free agent on November 2.

== Post-baseball career ==
On March 22, 2021, it was announced that Otero was hired by the Cleveland Indians to join their baseball operations department.

== Personal life ==
Otero and his wife, Tiffany, have three daughters. He is of Cuban descent.
