= Brandon Moss =

American baseball player (born 1983)

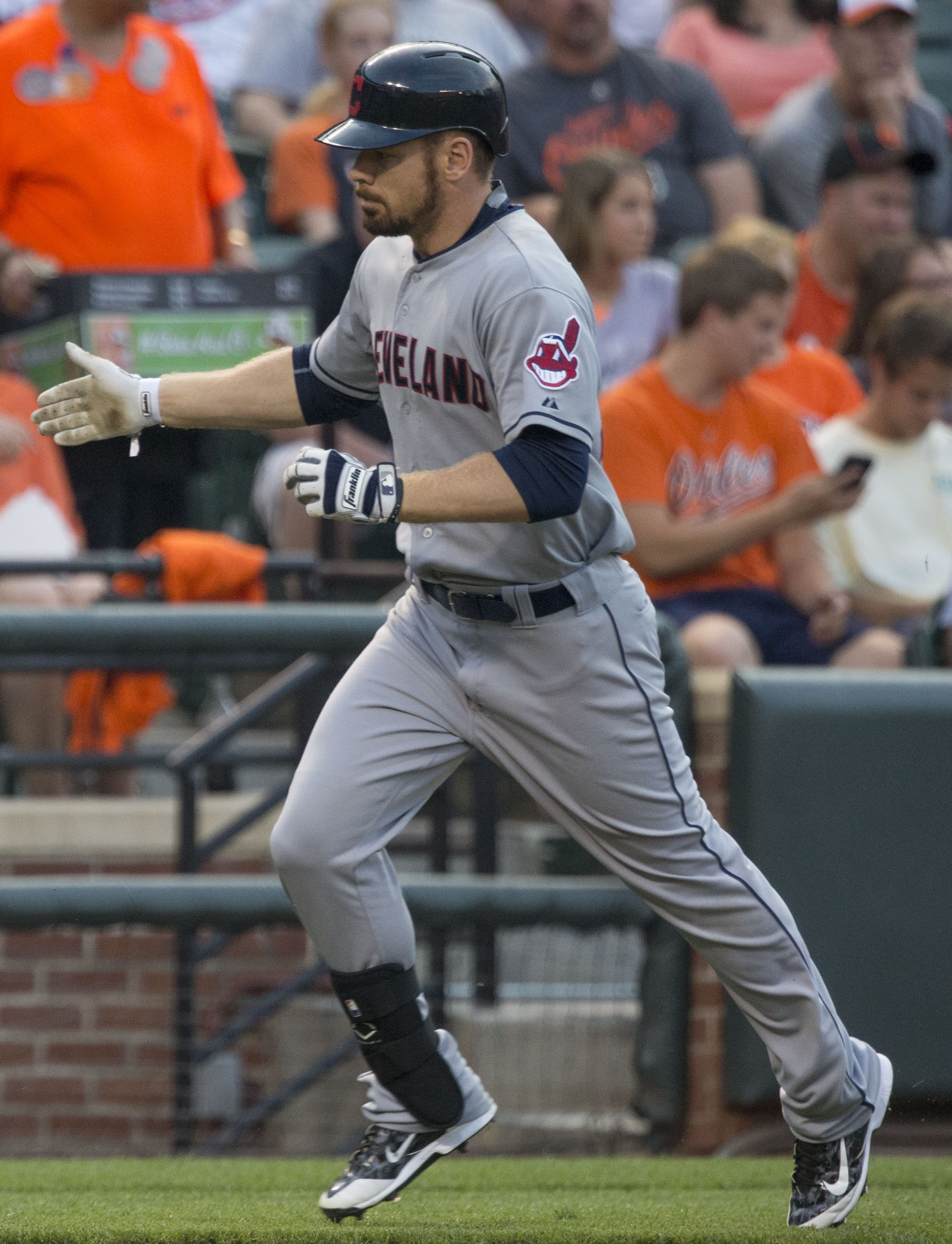
- Moss with the Cleveland Indians
- Outfielder / First baseman
- Born: September 16, 1983 (age 43); Monroe, Georgia, U.S.
- Batted: Left Threw: Right

MLB debut
- August 6, 2007, for the Boston Red Sox

Last MLB appearance
- October 1, 2017, for the Kansas City Royals

MLB statistics
- Batting average: .237
- Home runs: 160
- Runs batted in: 473
- Stats at Baseball Reference

Teams
- Boston Red Sox (2007–2008); Pittsburgh Pirates (2008–2010); Philadelphia Phillies (2011); Oakland Athletics (2012–2014); Cleveland Indians (2015); St. Louis Cardinals (2015–2016); Kansas City Royals (2017)

Career highlights and awards
- All-Star (2014)

Brandon Douglas Moss (born September 16, 1983) is an American former professional baseball outfielder and first baseman. He played in Major League Baseball (MLB) for the Boston Red Sox, Pittsburgh Pirates, Philadelphia Phillies, Oakland Athletics, Cleveland Indians, St. Louis Cardinals, and Kansas City Royals.

Moss was a prospect for the Red Sox organization, where he made his MLB debut in 2007. During the 2008 season, he was sent to the Pirates as part of a trade to acquire Jason Bay. Moss struggled in Pittsburgh, and he played for the Phillies in 2011. Moss joined the Athletics in 2012, where he became a strong contributor. He was named to appear in the 2014 MLB All-Star Game. After the 2014 season, the Athletics traded him to the Indians. Moss was then traded to the St. Louis Cardinals in 2015.

== Professional career ==
=== Boston Red Sox ===
Moss was drafted in the eighth round of the 2002 Major League Baseball draft by the Boston Red Sox, out of Loganville High School in Loganville, Georgia. He was an 18-year-old infielder and pitcher when drafted, but transitioned into an outfield role.

Moss climbed up the ladder of minor league ball, starting with the Gulf Coast Red Sox. He then played for the Lowell Spinners, Augusta GreenJackets, and Sarasota Red Sox. He spent two years with the Double-A Portland Sea Dogs in 2005 and 2006 and played for the Triple-A Pawtucket Red Sox.

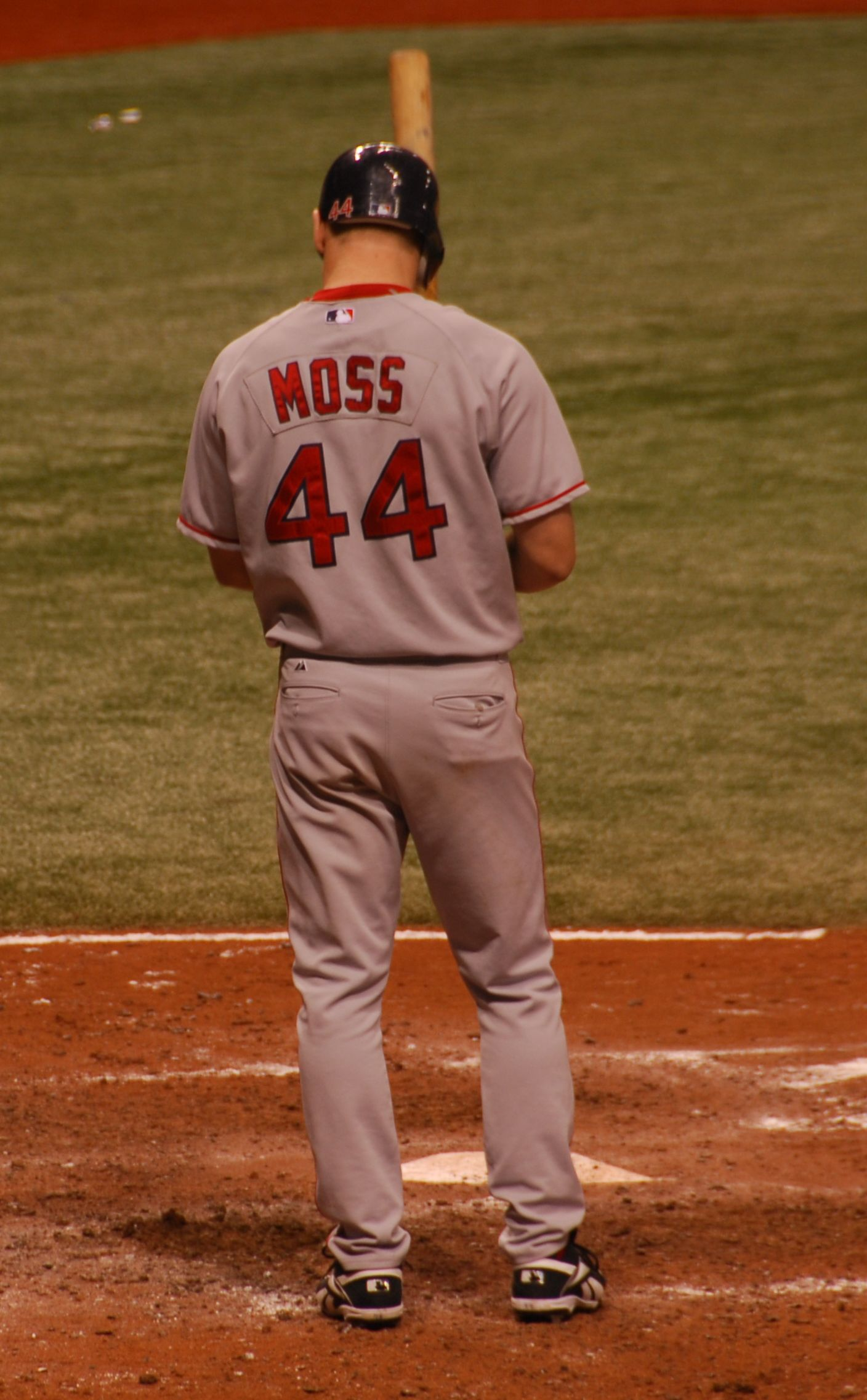
Moss with the Boston Red Sox in 2007

On August 6, 2007, Moss was called up to Boston to replace Eric Hinske when Hinske was placed on bereavement leave. He recorded his first major league hit against Scot Shields of the Los Angeles Angels of Anaheim. He was optioned back to Triple-A Pawtucket on August 10 to make room for Hinske, who was returning from bereavement leave. On September 1, Moss was recalled to Boston when major league rosters expanded to 40 players.

During the MLB Japan Opening Series 2008 at the Tokyo Dome, Moss hit his first major league home run. After playing the first two games of the season, Moss was optioned back to the Triple-A Pawtucket Red Sox on March 26. He was recalled on April 29, and was batting .286 on May 3 when he was diagnosed with appendicitis and brought to the hospital for an emergency appendectomy.

=== Pittsburgh Pirates ===
On July 31, Moss was traded along with pitcher Craig Hansen to the Pittsburgh Pirates in a three-team deal that sent Manny Ramirez to the Los Angeles Dodgers and Jason Bay to Boston. Moss immediately became the team's starting left fielder, replacing the departed Bay. He was later shifted to right field. He batted .222 with a .288 on-base percentage for the Pirates, in 158 at-bats.

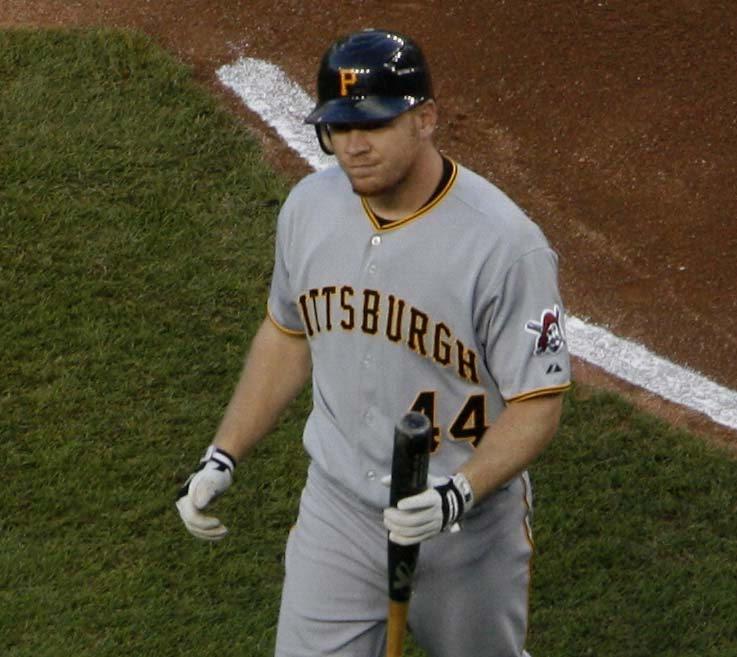
Moss with the Pittsburgh Pirates in 2009

He was the opening-day right fielder for the Pirates in 2009, but with the emergence of Delwyn Young and Garrett Jones he was demoted from that role. He did see time pinch-hitting and some starts. He finished 2009 with 20 doubles, four triples, seven home runs, 41 runs batted in, one stolen base, and a .236 average, .304 on-base percentage, and .364 slugging percentage in 385 at-bats.

After hitting 3-for-37 in spring training in 2010, and batting .154 in 26 at-bats during the beginning of the season, Moss was designated for assignment by the Pirates on March 29. He later cleared waivers and was outrighted to AAA (Indianapolis Indians).

=== Philadelphia Phillies ===
In December 2010, Moss signed a minor league contract with the Philadelphia Phillies. He spent most of the season in the minor leagues and was called up to the big league club on September 16 after playing for the AAA Lehigh Valley IronPigs in the International League Championship series. He became a free agent on October 18. He was hitless in six at-bats for the Phillies.

=== Oakland Athletics ===
On December 1, 2011, Moss signed a minor league contract with the Oakland Athletics. Playing in Class AAA, Moss considered retiring from baseball so that he could return to Georgia and work as a firefighter. On June 6, 2012, nine days before Moss could opt out of his contract, the Athletics promoted Moss to the major leagues. Moss struggled in his first five games but hit five home runs in the next four games. Moss earned his third career walk-off by hitting a single, allowing Yoenis Céspedes to score, against the New York Yankees on July 20. Moss again earned another walk-off, this time with a home run, in the bottom of the 10th inning on September 29 against the Seattle Mariners.

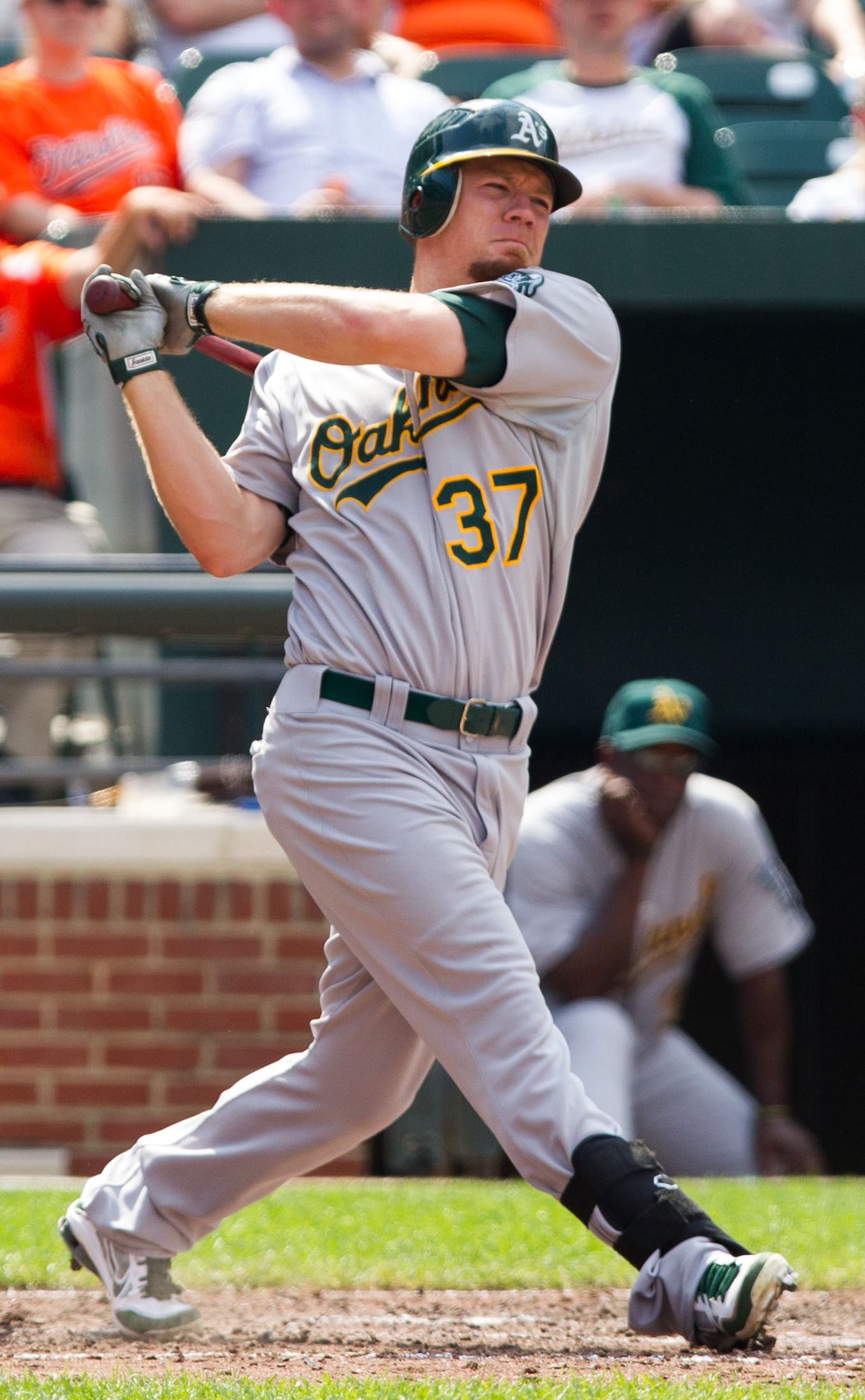
Moss batting for the Oakland Athletics in 2012

In 2012, Moss teamed up with Chris Carter for a first base platoon. He posted a .291/.358/.596 line with 21 home runs, which was third on the team behind Cespedes (23 home runs) and Josh Reddick (32 home runs), in 265 at-bats. On April 30, 2013, Los Angeles Angels relief pitcher Barry Enright surrendered a two-run walk-off home run to Moss in the nineteenth inning. The home run (Moss' second of the night), which ended the longest game in Athletics history, took place over six and a half hours after the first pitch, which was thrown by the Athletics' Dan Straily 7:05PM PT the previous day. Moss had an overall good 2013 season hitting .256 with 30 homers and 87 RBI.

Moss had a hot start to the 2014 season with a .265 batting average, 23 home runs, and 71 RBI (only behind A's teammate third baseman Josh Donaldson). In addition to this, Moss had 3 grand slams through July 24 (one each against the Los Angeles Angels of Anaheim, Baltimore Orioles and Houston Astros). Along with several teammates, Moss represented the Oakland Athletics at the 2014 All-Star Game in Minneapolis.

Moss hit two home runs, one being a two-run no-doubter to right field in the top of the first inning, the other a three-run blast to deep center during the top of the sixth in the 2014 American League Wild Card Game against the Kansas City Royals. Moss's 5 RBI night set a new record for the Athletics for most RBIs in a single postseason game, but it was not enough to secure victory for the A's as the Royals won 9-8.

=== Cleveland Indians ===
On December 8, 2014, the Athletics traded Moss to the Cleveland Indians in exchange for Joey Wendle. During the off-season, he had surgery to correct a hip labral tear and gluteal tear, affecting his performance in 2015. As Moss commented, he had lost torque in his swing. Thus, he "hit fly balls with the same rate, struck out at the same rate, walked at almost the same rate. Those fly balls were not going over the fence, they were caught." He played 94 games with Cleveland, hitting 15 home runs with 50 RBI.

=== St. Louis Cardinals ===
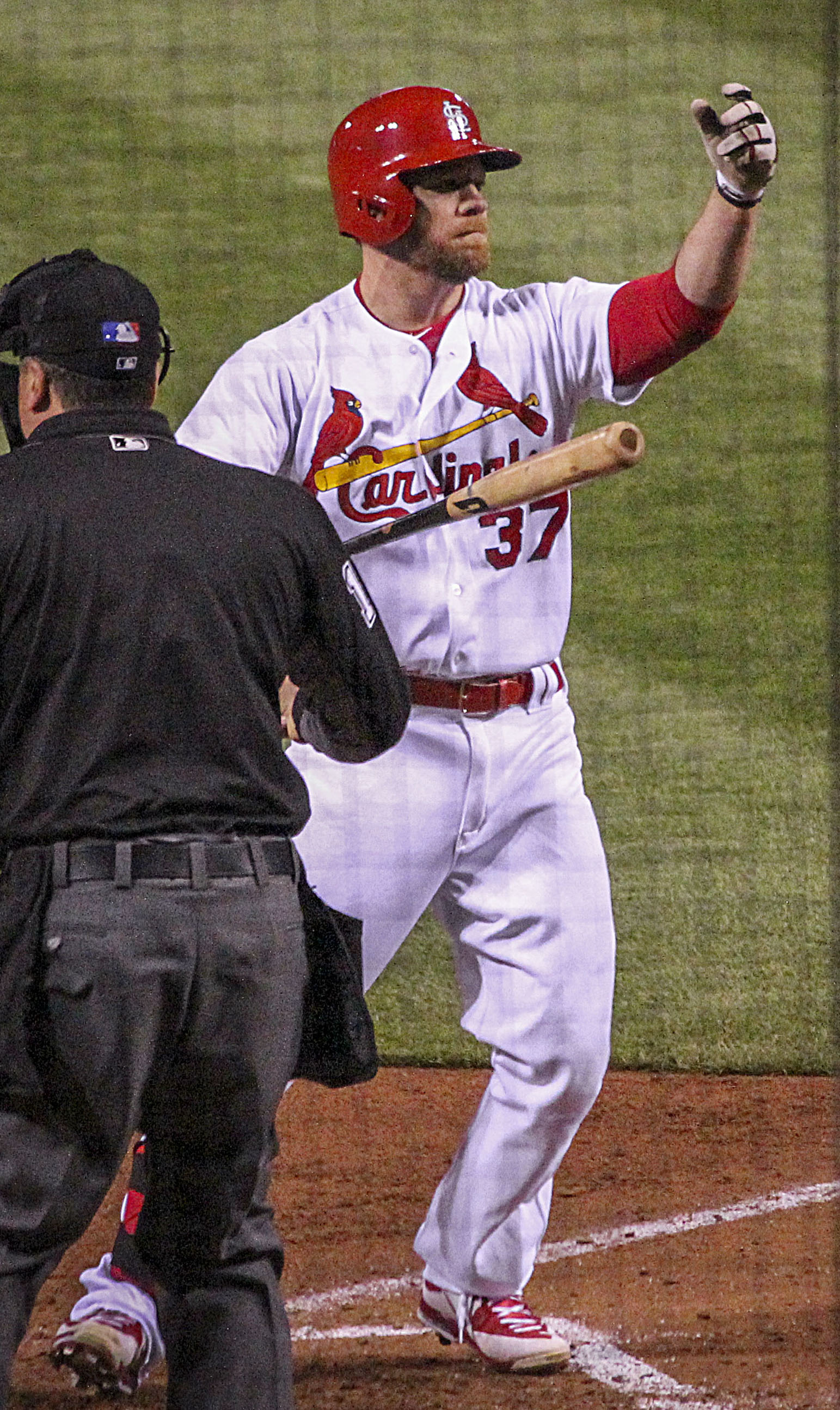
Moss playing for the St. Louis Cardinals in 2016

On July 30, 2015, the Indians traded Moss to the St. Louis Cardinals in exchange for minor league pitcher Rob Kaminsky. He collected his first hit with the Cardinals, a single, on August 1 in a 6–2 loss to the Colorado Rockies. His first RBI for the club occurred the next day, also against the Rockies, a game-winning single to score Jason Heyward in the bottom of the ninth inning. He hit his first home run as a Cardinal on August 27 in the top of the fifth against the Arizona Diamondbacks. On September 1, Moss hit a three-run, walk-off home run against the Washington Nationals at Busch Stadium for an 8–5 win. He combined to hit 19 home runs and 58 RBI with Cleveland and St. Louis in 2015.

An arbitration-eligible player prior to the 2016 season, Moss and the Cardinals agreed to a one-year, $8.25 million contract on January 15, 2016, a raise from $6.5 million. On April 10, he hit his first home run of the season off Williams Pérez of the Atlanta Braves, and the first of his career against Atlanta, thus giving him a home run against all 30 teams. His tenth home run of the season overall, hit against the Milwaukee Brewers on June 1, was his third as a pinch hitter, helping to tie the franchise record for pinch hit home runs in a season as a team with 10, set in 1998. He hit the longest home run in Busch Stadium history in a 4–2 loss to Kansas City on June 30, 2016, which traveled 477 feet (145 m), and to that point, was the second-longest home run of the season in the major leagues.

The Cardinals placed Moss on the DL on July 5 with an ankle sprain, and he returned on August 2.

=== Kansas City Royals ===
On February 1, 2017, Moss signed a two-year, $12 million contract with the Kansas City Royals. The contract included a mutual option for the 2019 season.

=== Second stint with the Athletics ===
On January 29, 2018, Moss, along with Ryan Buchter, was traded to the Athletics in exchange for Jesse Hahn and Heath Fillmyer. Moss was designated for assignment on March 4. After his designation, Moss announced he would retire if he did not find another major league job. He was released two days later.

== Personal life ==
Moss and his wife, Allison, married when he was 20 years old and she was 18. They had their first child, Jayden, in 2009, and their second child, Brody, in 2013.

Moss is a distant cousin of country music singer Alan Jackson.

== See also ==
- Boston Red Sox all-time roster
- Cleveland Indians all-time roster
- Philadelphia Phillies all-time roster
- Pittsburgh Pirates all-time roster
- Oakland Athletics all-time roster
- St. Louis Cardinals all-time roster
