= 2014 Boston Red Sox season =

Major League Baseball season

2014 Boston Red Sox
- League: American League
- Division: East
- Ballpark: Fenway Park
- City: Boston, Massachusetts
- Record: 71–91 (.438)
- Divisional place: 5th
- Owners: John W. Henry (Fenway Sports Group)
- President: Larry Lucchino
- General manager: Ben Cherington
- Manager: John Farrell
- Television: NESN (Don Orsillo, Jerry Remy, Dennis Eckersley, Jon Rish, Jamie Erdahl, Adam Pellerin, Leah Hextall)
- Radio: WEEI-FM; Boston Red Sox Radio Network (Joe Castiglione, Dave O'Brien, Sean Grande, Lou Merloni, Uri Berenguer, Juan Oscar Baez)
- Stats: ESPN.com; Baseball Reference

The 2014 Boston Red Sox season was the 114th season in the franchise's Major League Baseball history. The Red Sox finished last in the five-team American League East with a record of 71–91, twenty-five games behind the Baltimore Orioles.

It was the second last-place finish for the team in three years, and they were the second defending World Series champions to finish last in their division, the first having been the 1998 Florida Marlins. They also became the first MLB team to finish last in one season, win the World Series the next, and finish last again the following season.

== Offseason ==
=== November ===
- On November 1, 2013, the Red Sox picked up their $13 million club option on their ace pitcher Jon Lester for 2014.
- On November 11, 2013, Boston announced that Jacoby Ellsbury, Stephen Drew and Mike Napoli have all declined the qualifying offer from the club and hit the free agent market.

=== December ===
- On December 3, 2013, the Red Sox signed catcher A. J. Pierzynski to a one-year, $8.25 million contract.
- On December 3, 2013, just hours after Boston's signing of Pierzynski, catcher Jarrod Saltalamacchia signed a 3-year, $21 million deal with the Miami Marlins.
- On December 3, 2013, a third and final offseason move culminated the day with an announcement with major implications for the league and free agency market. Outfielder Jacoby Ellsbury signed a 7-year, $153 million deal with the New York Yankees.
- On December 12, 2013, the Red Sox resigned Mike Napoli to a two-year contract.
- On December 18, 2013, the Red Sox signed Japanese pitcher Shunsuke Watanabe to a minor league contract with an invitation to spring training.
- On December 18, 2013, the Red Sox traded pitcher Franklin Morales to the Colorado Rockies for infielder Jonathan Herrera.

=== January ===
- On January 22, 2014, the Red Sox signed outfielder Grady Sizemore to a one-year deal, initially only worth $750,000 but with a possible $6 million in incentives. Sizemore had been out of baseball since 2011 due to injuries.

=== February ===
- On February 16, 2014, one day after pitchers and catchers reported, Ryan Dempster announced he will not pitch in 2014.
- On February 20, 2014, the Red Sox signed Chris Capuano to a one-year worth $2,250,000 contract with incentives to make the contract worth up to $5,000,000

=== March ===
- On March 23, 2014, the Red Sox and David Ortiz agreed on a 1-year contract extension through the 2015 season worth $16 million with a club/vesting option for 2016 and a club option for 2017.

== During the season ==
=== Opening Day ===
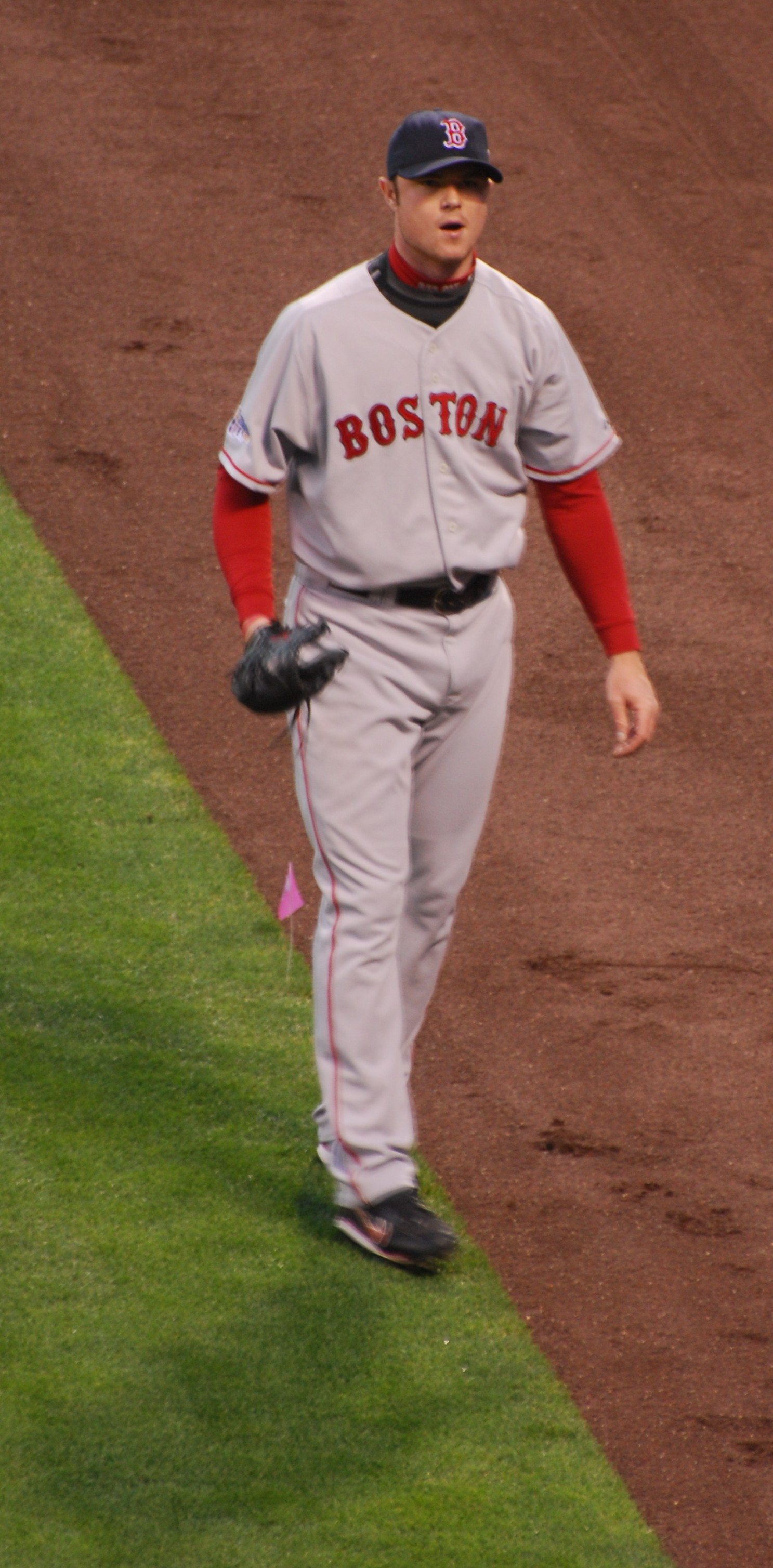
Opening Day starter Jon Lester

The 2014 Red Sox season opened on March 31, with a 2–1 road loss against the Baltimore Orioles.

==== Opening Day lineup ====
29	Daniel Nava	RF
15	Dustin Pedroia	2B
34	David Ortiz	DH
12	Mike Napoli	1B
37	Mike Carp	LF
38	Grady Sizemore	CF
2	Xander Bogaerts	SS
40	A. J. Pierzynski	C
16	Will Middlebrooks	3B
31	Jon Lester	P

=== April ===
- On April 7, the Red Sox signed infielder Ryan Roberts. He is designated for assignment 11 days later, but stays with the organization.

=== May ===
- On May 21, the Red Sox sign Stephen Drew.

=== June ===
- On June 18, the Red Sox release Grady Sizemore.

=== July ===
- On July 1, the Red Sox release Chris Capuano.
- On July 9, the Red Sox release A. J. Pierzynski.
- On July 26, the Red Sox traded Jake Peavy to the San Francisco Giants for LHP Edwin Escobar and RHP Heath Hembree.
- On July 30, the Red Sox traded Félix Doubront to the Chicago Cubs for a player to be named later (Marco Hernández).
- On July 31, the Red Sox traded Jon Lester, Jonny Gomes and cash considerations to the Oakland Athletics for OF Yoenis Céspedes and a competitive balance draft pick. The Red Sox traded John Lackey to the St. Louis Cardinals for Allen Craig and Joe Kelly. The Red Sox traded Andrew Miller to the Baltimore Orioles for Eduardo Rodríguez. The Red Sox traded Stephen Drew to the New York Yankees for Kelly Johnson.

=== August ===
- On August 1, the Red Sox release Mike Carp.
- On August 22, 2014, the Red Sox sign Rusney Castillo to a 7-year, $72.5 million deal.

== Season standings ==
AL East
Team	W	L	Pct.	GB	Home	Road
Baltimore Orioles	96	66	.593	—	50‍–‍31	46‍–‍35
New York Yankees	84	78	.519	12	43‍–‍38	41‍–‍40
Toronto Blue Jays	83	79	.512	13	46‍–‍35	37‍–‍44
Tampa Bay Rays	77	85	.475	19	36‍–‍45	41‍–‍40
Boston Red Sox	71	91	.438	25	34‍–‍47	37‍–‍44

Division leaders
Team	W	L	Pct.
Los Angeles Angels of Anaheim	98	64	.605
Baltimore Orioles	96	66	.593
Detroit Tigers	90	72	.556

Wild Card teams (Top 2 teams qualify for postseason)
Team	W	L	Pct.	GB
Kansas City Royals	89	73	.549	+1
Oakland Athletics	88	74	.543	—
Seattle Mariners	87	75	.537	1
Cleveland Indians	85	77	.525	3
New York Yankees	84	78	.519	4
Toronto Blue Jays	83	79	.512	5
Tampa Bay Rays	77	85	.475	11
Chicago White Sox	73	89	.451	15
Boston Red Sox	71	91	.438	17
Houston Astros	70	92	.432	18
Minnesota Twins	70	92	.432	18
Texas Rangers	67	95	.414	21

== Record vs. opponents ==
2014 American League record Source: MLB Standings Grid – 2014
Team	BAL	BOS	CWS	CLE	DET	HOU	KC	LAA	MIN	NYY	OAK	SEA	TB	TEX	TOR	NL
Baltimore	—	11–8	5–1	3–4	1–5	4–3	3–4	4–2	4–3	13–6	2–4	5–2	12–7	6–1	11–8	12–8
Boston	8–11	—	4–3	2–5	1–5	4–3	6–1	2–5	4–2	7–12	3–4	1–5	9–10	4–2	7–12	9–11
Chicago	1–5	3–4	—	9–10	9–10	3–3	6–13	1–5	9–10	2–5	4–3	3–4	5–2	2–4	5–2	11–9
Cleveland	4–3	5–2	10–9	—	8–11	5–2	10–9	2–5	11–8	4–3	2–4	2–4	4–2	6–1	2–4	10–10
Detroit	5–1	5–1	10–9	11–8	—	4–3	13–6	3–4	9–10	3–4	5–2	2–4	3–4	4–3	1–5	12–8
Houston	3–4	3–4	3–3	2–5	3–4	—	3–3	7–12	3–3	4–2	8–11	9–10	2–5	11–8	4–3	5–15
Kansas City	4–3	1–6	13–6	9–10	6–13	3–3	—	3–3	11–8	4–3	5–2	2–5	4–2	5–1	4–3	15–5
Los Angeles	2–4	5–2	5–1	5–2	4–3	12–7	3–3	—	7–0	2–4	10–9	7–12	5–2	14–5	5–2	12–8
Minnesota	3–4	2–4	10–9	8–11	10–9	3–3	8–11	0–7	—	3–4	1–6	5–2	2–4	2–5	4–2	9–11
New York	6–13	12–7	5–2	3–4	4–3	2–4	3–4	4–2	4–3	—	2–4	3–3	8–11	4–3	11–8	13–7
Oakland	4–2	4–3	3–4	4–2	2–5	11–8	2–5	9–10	6–1	4–2	—	9–10	4–2	9–10	4–3	13–7
Seattle	2–5	5–1	4–3	4–2	4–2	10–9	5–2	12–7	2–5	3–3	10–9	—	4–3	9–10	4–3	9–11
Tampa Bay	7–12	10–9	2–5	2–4	4–3	5–2	2–4	2–5	4–2	11–8	2–4	3–4	—	5–2	8–11	10–10
Texas	1–6	2–4	4–2	1–6	3–4	8–11	1–5	5–14	5–2	3–4	10–9	10–9	2–5	—	2–4	10–10
Toronto	8–11	12–7	2–5	4–2	5–1	3–4	3–4	2–5	2–4	8–11	3–4	3–4	11–8	4–2	—	13–7

Red Sox vs. National League
Team	NL Central					
Team	CHC	CIN	MIL	PIT	STL	ATL
Boston	0–3	4–0	0–3	0–3	1–2	4–0

== Roster ==
2014 Boston Red Sox
Roster
Pitchers: 35 Burke Badenhop; 68 Matt Barnes; 32 Craig Breslow; 66 Drake Britton; 11 Clay Buchholz; 55 Chris Capuano; 62 Rubby De La Rosa; 22 Félix Doubront; 71 Edwin Escobar; 38,37 Heath Hembree; 56 Joe Kelly; 41 John Lackey; 59 Tommy Layne; 31 Jon Lester; 30 Andrew Miller; 54 Edward Mujica; 44 Jake Peavy; 63 Anthony Ranaudo; 36 Junichi Tazawa; 19 Koji Uehara; 64 Allen Webster; 52,30 Alex Wilson; 67 Brandon Workman; 65 Steven Wright	Catchers: 61 Dan Butler; 3 David Ross; 40 A. J. Pierzynski; 55 Christian Vázquez; Infielders: 2 Xander Bogaerts; 70 Garin Cecchini; 7 Stephen Drew; 10 Jonathan Herrera; 26 Brock Holt; 7 Kelly Johnson; 20 Ryan Lavarnway; 16 Will Middlebrooks; 12 Mike Napoli; 34 David Ortiz; 15 Dustin Pedroia; 72 Carlos Rivero; 7 Ryan Roberts; 7 Jemile Weeks	Outfielders: 50 Mookie Betts; 25 Jackie Bradley Jr.; 73 Bryce Brentz; 39 Corey Brown; 37 Mike Carp; 38 Rusney Castillo; 52 Yoenis Céspedes; 5 Allen Craig; 5 Jonny Gomes; 68 Alex Hassan; 29 Daniel Nava; 38 Grady Sizemore; 18 Shane Victorino	Manager: 53 John Farrell; Coaches: 86 Brian Abraham (bullpen catcher); 43 Arnie Beyeler (first base); 13 Brian Butterfield (third base); 28 Greg Colbrunn (hitting); 77 Tim Hyers (interim hitting); 58 Dana LeVangie (bullpen); 17 Torey Lovullo (bench); 88 Alex Martinez (bullpen catcher); 47 Juan Nieves (pitching); 57 Vic Rodriguez (assistant hitting)

== Player stats ==
=== Batting ===
Note: G = Games played; AB = At bats; R = Runs; H = Hits; 2B = Doubles; 3B = Triples; HR = Home runs; RBI = Runs batted in; SB = Stolen bases; BB = Bases on balls; AVG = Batting average; SLG = Slugging average

Player	G	AB	R	H	2B	3B	HR	RBI	SB	BB	AVG	SLG
Dustin Pedroia	135	551	72	153	33	0	7	53	6	51	.278	.396
Xander Bogaerts	144	538	60	129	28	1	12	46	2	39	.240	.362
David Ortiz	142	518	59	136	27	0	35	104	0	75	.263	.517
Brock Holt	106	449	68	126	23	5	4	29	12	33	.281	.381
Mike Napoli	119	415	49	103	20	0	17	55	3	78	.248	.419
Jackie Bradley Jr.	127	384	45	76	19	2	1	30	8	31	.198	.266
Daniel Nava	113	363	41	98	21	0	4	37	4	33	.270	.361
A. J. Pierzynski	72	256	19	65	10	1	4	31	0	9	.254	.348
Will Middlebrooks	63	215	14	41	10	0	2	19	1	15	.191	.265
Jonny Gomes	78	209	22	49	7	0	6	32	0	26	.234	.354
Yoenis Céspedes	51	201	27	54	10	3	5	33	4	7	.269	.423
Mookie Betts	52	189	34	55	12	1	5	18	7	21	.291	.444
Grady Sizemore	52	185	14	40	10	2	2	15	5	19	.216	.324
Christian Vázquez	55	175	15	42	9	0	1	20	0	19	.240	.309
David Ross	50	152	16	28	7	0	7	15	0	16	.184	.368
Stephen Drew	39	131	11	23	6	1	4	11	1	14	.176	.328
Shane Victorino	30	123	14	33	6	1	2	12	2	6	.268	.382
Allen Craig	29	94	7	12	3	0	1	2	1	9	.128	.191
Jonathan Herrera	42	90	10	21	1	2	0	9	1	7	.233	.289
Mike Carp	42	86	9	17	5	1	0	9	0	11	.198	.279
Rusney Castillo	10	36	6	12	1	0	2	6	3	3	.333	.528
Garin Cecchini	11	31	6	8	3	0	1	4	0	3	.258	.452
Jemile Weeks	14	26	6	8	3	0	0	3	2	4	.308	.423
Bryce Brentz	9	26	5	8	2	0	0	2	0	0	.308	.385
Kelly Johnson	10	25	1	4	1	0	0	1	0	0	.160	.200
Ryan Roberts	8	19	1	2	0	0	0	0	0	3	.105	.105
Dan Butler	7	19	1	4	3	0	0	2	0	1	.211	.368
Ryan Lavarnway	9	10	0	0	0	0	0	0	0	0	.000	.000
Alex Hassan	3	8	1	1	0	0	0	0	0	1	.125	.125
Carlos Rivero	4	7	1	4	2	0	1	3	0	1	.571	1.286
Corey Brown	3	1	0	0	0	0	0	0	0	0	.000	.000
Pitcher totals	162	19	0	3	0	0	0	0	1	0	.158	.158
Team totals	162	5551	634	1355	282	20	123	601	63	535	.244	.369

=== Pitching ===
Note: W = Wins; L = Losses; ERA = Earned run average; G = Games pitched; GS = Games started; SV = Saves; IP = Innings pitched; H = Hits allowed; R = Runs allowed; ER = Earned runs allowed; BB = Walks allowed; SO = Strikeouts

Player	W	L	ERA	G	GS	SV	IP	H	R	ER	BB	SO
Clay Buchholz	8	11	5.34	28	28	0	170.1	182	108	101	54	132
Jon Lester	10	7	2.52	21	21	0	143.0	128	52	40	32	149
John Lackey	11	7	3.60	21	21	0	137.1	137	60	55	32	116
Jake Peavy	1	9	4.72	20	20	0	124.0	131	67	65	46	100
Rubby De La Rosa	4	8	4.43	19	18	0	101.2	116	51	50	35	74
Brandon Workman	1	10	5.17	19	15	0	87.0	88	57	50	36	70
Burke Badenhop	0	3	2.29	70	0	1	70.2	70	20	18	19	40
Koji Uehara	6	5	2.52	64	0	26	64.1	51	18	18	8	80
Junichi Tazawa	4	3	2.86	71	0	0	63.0	58	23	20	17	64
Joe Kelly	4	2	4.11	10	10	0	61.1	47	29	28	32	41
Edward Mujica	2	4	3.90	64	0	8	60.0	69	28	26	14	43
Félix Doubront	2	4	6.07	17	10	0	59.1	69	45	40	26	43
Allen Webster	5	3	5.03	11	11	0	59.0	58	35	33	28	36
Craig Breslow	2	4	5.96	60	0	1	54.1	73	40	36	28	37
Andrew Miller	3	5	2.34	50	0	0	42.1	25	13	11	13	69
Anthony Ranaudo	4	3	4.81	7	7	0	39.1	39	21	21	16	15
Chris Capuano	1	1	4.55	28	0	0	31.2	34	17	16	15	29
Alex Wilson	1	0	1.91	18	0	0	28.1	20	8	6	5	19
Steven Wright	0	1	2.57	6	1	0	21.0	21	8	6	4	22
Tommy Layne	2	1	0.95	30	0	0	19.0	14	4	2	8	14
Heath Hembree	0	0	4.50	6	0	0	10.0	11	5	5	5	6
Matt Barnes	0	0	4.00	5	0	0	9.0	11	4	4	2	8
Drake Britton	0	0	0.00	7	0	0	6.2	5	0	0	2	4
Edwin Escobar	0	0	4.50	2	0	0	2.0	1	1	1	0	2
Mike Carp	0	0	9.00	1	0	0	1.0	0	1	1	5	0
Team totals	71	91	4.01	162	162	36	1465.2	1458	715	653	482	1213

== Game log ==
Red Sox Win	Red Sox Loss	Game postponed	Eliminated from Playoff Race
Boldface text denotes a Red Sox pitcher

Boston Red Sox 2014 Season Game Log — Season Record: (71–91), 5th in AL East
March / April (13–14)

#	Date	Opponent	Score	Win	Loss	Save	Stadium	Attendance	Record	Box/ Streak
1	March 31	@ Orioles	1–2	Britton (1–0)	**Lester** (0–1)	Hunter (1)	Camden Yards	46,685	0–1	L1
2	April 2	@ Orioles	6–2	**Lackey** (1–0)	Jiménez (0–1)		Camden Yards	25,708	1–1	W1
3	April 3	@ Orioles	4–3	**Doubront** (1–0)	Chen (0–1)	**Uehara** (1)	Camden Yards	20,880	2–1	W2
4	April 4	Brewers	2–6	Kintzler (1–0)	**Mujica** (0–1)		**Fenway Park**	36,728	2–2	L1
5	April 5	Brewers	6–7 (11)	Thornburg (1–0)	**Badenhop** (0–1)	Rodríguez (2)	**Fenway Park**	35,729	2–3	L2
6	April 6	Brewers	0–4	Gallardo (2–0)	**Lester** (0–2)		**Fenway Park**	35,958	2–4	L3
7	April 7	Rangers	5–1	**Lackey** (2–0)	Scheppers (0–1)		**Fenway Park**	35,842	3–4	W1
8	April 8	Rangers	7–10	Pérez (1–0)	**Doubront** (1–1)		**Fenway Park**	34,142	3–5	L1
9	April 9	Rangers	4–2	**Miller** (1–0)	Ogando (0–1)	**Uehara** (2)	**Fenway Park**	33,585	4–5	W1
10	April 10	@ Yankees	1–4	Pineda (1–1)	**Buchholz** (0–1)	Phelps (1)	Yankee Stadium	42,821	4–6	L1
11	April 11	@ Yankees	4–2	**Lester** (1–2)	Sabathia (1–2)	**Mujica** (1)	Yankee Stadium	44,121	5–6	W1
12	April 12	@ Yankees	4–7	Kuroda (2–1)	**Lackey** (2–1)	Kelley (2)	Yankee Stadium	48,572	5–7	L1
13	April 13	@ Yankees	2–3	Nova (2–1)	**Doubront** (1–2)	Kelley (3)	Yankee Stadium	46,081	5–8	L2
14	April 15	@ White Sox	1–2	Webb (1–0)	**Badenhop** (0–2)		U.S. Cellular Field	13,402	5–9	L3
15	April 16	@ White Sox	6–4 (14)	**Capuano** (1–0)	García (0–1)	**Badenhop** (1)	U.S. Cellular Field	13,302	6–9	W1
16	April 17	@ White Sox	3–1	**Lester** (2–2)	Belisario (1–2)	**Uehara** (3)	U.S. Cellular Field	17,454	7–9	W2
17	April 18	Orioles	4–8	Tillman (2–1)	**Lackey** (2–2)	O'Day (1)	**Fenway Park**	36,408	7–10	L1
18	April 19	Orioles	4–2	**Tazawa** (1–0)	Norris (0–2)	**Uehara** (4)	**Fenway Park**	37,689	8–10	W1
19	April 20	Orioles	6–5	**Mujica** (1–1)	Matusz (1–1)		**Fenway Park**	33,947	9–10	W2
20	April 21	Orioles	6–7	Chen (3–1)	**Buchholz** (0–2)	Hunter (5)	**Fenway Park**	37,513	9–11	L1
21	April 22	Yankees	3–9	Tanaka (3–0)	**Lester** (2–3)		**Fenway Park**	37,041	9–12	L2
22	April 23	Yankees	5–1	**Lackey** (3–2)	Pineda (2–2)		**Fenway Park**	37,015	10–12	W1
23	April 24	Yankees	5–14	Sabathia (3–2)	**Doubront** (1–3)		**Fenway Park**	37,356	10–13	L1
24	April 25	@ Blue Jays	8–1	**Peavy** (1–0)	Buehrle (4–1)		Rogers Centre	29,411	11–13	W1
25	April 26	@ Blue Jays	7–6	**Buchholz** (1–2)	Morrow (1–2)	**Uehara** (5)	Rogers Centre	40,322	12–13	W2
26	April 27	@ Blue Jays	1–7	Dickey (2–3)	**Lester** (2–4)		Rogers Centre	45,260	12–14	L1
27	April 29	Rays	7–4	**Lackey** (4–2)	Gomes (1–1)	**Uehara** (6)	**Fenway Park**	34,794	13–14	W1
—	April 30	Rays	**Postponed (rain)** (Makeup date: May 1)							

May (13–15)

#	Date	Opponent	Score	Win	Loss	Save	Stadium	Attendance	Record	Box/ Streak
28	May 1	Rays	1–2	Gomes (2–1)	**Peavy** (1–1)	Balfour (5)	**Fenway Park**	35,621	13–15	L1
29	May 1	Rays	5–6	McGee (2–0)	**Uehara** (0–1)	Balfour (6)	**Fenway Park**	33,465	13–16	L2
30	May 2	Athletics	7–1	**Buchholz** (2–2)	Straily (1–2)		**Fenway Park**	34,850	14–16	W1
31	May 3	Athletics	6–3	**Lester** (3–4)	Milone (0–3)	**Uehara** (7)	**Fenway Park**	37,042	15–16	W2
32	May 4	Athletics	2–3 (10)	Johnson (3–2)	**Capuano** (1–1)		**Fenway Park**	35,649	15–17	L1
33	May 6	Reds	4–3 (12)	**Breslow** (1–0)	Ondrusek (0–2)		**Fenway Park**	36,004	16–17	W1
34	May 7	Reds	4–3	**Breslow** (2–0)	Hoover (1–4)	**Uehara** (8)	**Fenway Park**	37,072	17–17	W2
35	May 9	@ Rangers	0–8	Darvish (3–1)	**Buchholz** (2–3)		Globe Life Park	45,392	17–18	L1
36	May 10	@ Rangers	8–3	**Lester** (4–4)	Pérez (4–3)		Globe Life Park	47,964	18–18	W1
37	May 11	@ Rangers	5–2	**Lackey** (5–2)	Ross (1–4)	**Uehara** (9)	Globe Life Park	41,407	19–18	W2
38	May 13	@ Twins	6–8	Perkins (1–0)	**Miller** (1–1)		Target Field	23,949	19–19	L1
39	May 14	@ Twins	9–4	**Doubront** (2–3)	Correia (1–5)		Target Field	26,802	20–19	W1
40	May 15	@ Twins	3–4 (10)	Duensing (1–2)	**Miller** (1–2)		Target Field	29,628	20–20	L1
41	May 16	Tigers	0–1	Scherzer (6–1)	**Lester** (4–5)	Nathan (11)	**Fenway Park**	37,225	20–21	L2
42	May 17	Tigers	1–6	Porcello (7–1)	**Lackey** (5–3)		**Fenway Park**	37,608	20–22	L3
43	May 18	Tigers	2–6	Sánchez (1–2)	**Peavy** (1–2)		**Fenway Park**	35,006	20–23	L4
44	May 20	Blue Jays	4–7	Happ (3–1)	**Doubront** (2–4)	Janssen (4)	**Fenway Park**	37,904	20–24	L5
45	May 21	Blue Jays	4–6	Hutchison (3–3)	**Buchholz** (2–4)	Janssen (5)	**Fenway Park**	36,116	20–25	L6
46	May 22	Blue Jays	2–7	Buehrle (8–1)	**Lester** (4–6)		**Fenway Park**	36,018	20–26	L7
47	May 23	@ Rays	0–1	Oviedo (1–0)	**Miller** (1–3)		Tropicana Field	20,898	20–27	L8
48	May 24	@ Rays	5–6 (15)	Ramos (2–3)	**Miller** (1–4)		Tropicana Field	23,569	20–28	L9
49	May 25	@ Rays	5–8	Peralta (2–3)	**Breslow** (2–1)	Balfour (9)	Tropicana Field	26,199	20–29	L10
50	May 26	@ Braves	8–6	**Mujica** (2–1)	Thomas (1–2)	**Uehara** (10)	Turner Field	48,501	21–29	W1
51	May 27	@ Braves	6–3	**Lester** (5–6)	Varvaro (1–1)	**Uehara** (11)	Turner Field	37,168	22–29	W2
52	May 28	Braves	4–0	**Lackey** (6–3)	Floyd (0–2)		**Fenway Park**	36,189	23–29	W3
53	May 29	Braves	4–3	**Uehara** (1–1)	Kimbrel (0–1)		**Fenway Park**	36,292	24–29	W4
54	May 30	Rays	3–2 (10)	**Miller** (2–4)	Oviedo (1–2)		**Fenway Park**	35,820	25–29	W5
55	May 31	Rays	7–1	**De La Rosa** (1–0)	Odorizzi (2–5)		**Fenway Park**	37,076	26–29	W6

June (12–16)

#	Date	Opponent	Score	Win	Loss	Save	Stadium	Attendance	Record	Box/ Streak
56	June 1	Rays	4–0	**Lester** (6–6)	Bédard (2–4)		**Fenway Park**	37,688	27–29	W7
57	June 2	@ Indians	2–3	Masterson (3–4)	**Lackey** (6–4)	Allen (4)	Progressive Field	14,078	27–30	L1
58	June 3	@ Indians	3–5	Hagadone (1–0)	**Peavy** (1–3)	Allen (5)	Progressive Field	18,738	27–31	L2
59	June 4	@ Indians	4–7 (12)	Carrasco (1–3)	**Mujica** (2–2)		Progressive Field	20,209	27–32	L3
60	June 6	@ Tigers	2–6	Smyly (3–4)	**De La Rosa** (1–1)		Comerica Park	39,762	27–33	L4
61	June 7	@ Tigers	6–8	Scherzer (7–2)	**Lester** (6–7)		Comerica Park	43,359	27–34	L5
62	June 8	@ Tigers	5–3	**Lackey** (7–4)	Chamberlain (1–3)	**Uehara** (12)	Comerica Park	33,835	28–34	W1
63	June 9	@ Orioles	0–4	Norris (5–5)	**Peavy** (1–4)		Camden Yards	19,729	28–35	L1
64	June 10	@ Orioles	1–0	**Workman** (1–0)	Tillman (5–3)	**Uehara** (13)	Camden Yards	24,184	29–35	W1
65	June 11	@ Orioles	0–6	Chen (7–2)	**De La Rosa** (1–2)		Camden Yards	25,886	29–36	L1
66	June 12	Indians	5–2	**Lester** (7–7)	Tomlin (4–3)	**Uehara** (14)	**Fenway Park**	37,750	30–36	W1
67	June 13	Indians	10–3	**Lackey** (8–4)	Masterson (4–5)		**Fenway Park**	35,772	31–36	W2
68	June 14	Indians	2–3	Axford (2–3)	**Breslow** (2–2)	Allen (7)	**Fenway Park**	37,181	31–37	L1
69	June 15	Indians	2–3 (11)	Allen (3–1)	**Tazawa** (1–1)		**Fenway Park**	37,356	31–38	L2
70	June 16	Twins	1–0	**De La Rosa** (2–2)	Correia (3–8)	**Uehara** (15)	**Fenway Park**	35,693	32–38	W1
71	June 17	Twins	2–1	**Lester** (8–7)	Hughes (7–3)	**Mujica** (2)	**Fenway Park**	36,835	33–38	W2
72	June 18	Twins	2–1 (10)	**Uehara** (2–1)	Fien (3–4)		**Fenway Park**	36,489	34–38	W3
73	June 19	@ Athletics	2–4	Kazmir (9–2)	**Peavy** (1–5)	Otero (1)	O.co Coliseum	24,371	34–39	L1
74	June 20	@ Athletics	3–4	Abad (2–2)	**Miller** (2–5)	Doolittle (10)	O.co Coliseum	28,602	34–40	L2
75	June 21	@ Athletics	1–2 (10)	Otero (6–1)	**Mujica** (2–3)		O.co Coliseum	32,873	34–41	L3
76	June 22	@ Athletics	7–6 (10)	**Uehara** (3–1)	Abad (2–3)		O.co Coliseum	36,067	35–41	W1
77	June 23	@ Mariners	3–12	Hernández (9–2)	**Lackey** (8–5)		Safeco Field	26,860	35–42	L1
78	June 24	@ Mariners	2–8	Beimel (2–1)	**Peavy** (1–6)		Safeco Field	20,015	35–43	L2
79	June 25	@ Mariners	5–4	**Buchholz** (3–4)	Iwakuma (5–4)	**Uehara** (16)	Safeco Field	27,333	36–43	W1
80	June 27	@ Yankees	0–6	Nuño (2–4)	**Workman** (1–1)		Yankee Stadium	48,522	36–44	L1
81	June 28	@ Yankees	2–1	**Lester** (9–7)	Tanaka (11–3)	**Uehara** (17)	Yankee Stadium	48,433	37–44	W1
82	June 29	@ Yankees	8–5	**Lackey** (9–5)	Whitley (3–2)	**Uehara** (18)	Yankee Stadium	48,124	38–44	W2
83	June 30	Cubs	0–2	Arrieta (5–1)	**Peavy** (1–7)	Rondón (10)	**Fenway Park**	37,814	38–45	L1

July (10–15)

#	Date	Opponent	Score	Win	Loss	Save	Stadium	Attendance	Record	Box/ Streak
84	July 1	Cubs	1–2	Strop (1–3)	**Uehara** (3–2)	Rondón (11)	**Fenway Park**	36,748	38–46	L2
85	July 2	Cubs	9–16	Villanueva (4–5)	**Workman** (1–2)		**Fenway Park**	37,055	38–47	L3
86	July 4	Orioles	**Postponed due to Hurricane/Tropical Storm Arthur. Rescheduled for July 5 as part of a day-night doubleheader.**							
86	July 5	Orioles	3–2	**Uehara** (4–2)	McFarland (1–2)		**Fenway Park**	35,714	39–47	W1
87	July 5	Orioles	4–7	Brach (3–0)	**Lackey** (9–6)	Britton (13)	**Fenway Park**	36,468	39–48	L1
88	July 6	Orioles	6–7 (12)	Brach (4–0)	**Mujica** (2–4)	Britton (14)	**Fenway Park**	35,811	39–49	L2
89	July 7	White Sox	0–4	Carroll (3–5)	**Buchholz** (3–5)		**Fenway Park**	35,114	39–50	L3
90	July 8	White Sox	3–8	Danks (8–6)	**Workman** (1–3)		**Fenway Park**	35,345	39–51	L4
91	July 9	White Sox	5–4	**Uehara** (5–2)	Guerra (0–1)		**Fenway Park**	36,218	40–51	W1
92	July 10	White Sox	4–3 (10)	**Miller** (3–5)	Belisario (3–6)		**Fenway Park**	37,547	41–51	W2
93	July 11	@ Astros	8–3	**Lackey** (10–6)	Feldman (4–6)		Minute Maid Park	27,264	42–51	W3
94	July 12	@ Astros	2–3	Fields (2–4)	**Peavy** (1–8)	Qualls (10)	Minute Maid Park	26,322	42–52	L1
95	July 13	@ Astros	11–0	**Buchholz** (4–5)	Peacock (3–6)		Minute Maid Park	20,681	43–52	W1
ASG	July 15	All-Star Game	NL 3–5 AL	Scherzer (AL, DET)	Neshek (NL, STL)	Perkins (AL, MIN)	Target Field	Minneapolis, MN		ASG
ASG	The Red Sox were represented in the All-Star game by Jon Lester and Koji Uehara.									
96	July 18	Royals	5–4	**Buchholz** (5–5)	Downs (0–3)	**Uehara** (19)	**Fenway Park**	37,743	44–52	W2
97	July 19	Royals	2–1	**De La Rosa** (3–2)	Duffy (5–10)	**Uehara** (20)	**Fenway Park**	37,878	45–52	W3
98	July 20	Royals	6–0	**Lester** (10–7)	Ventura (6–7)		**Fenway Park**	37,439	46–52	W4
99	July 21	@ Blue Jays	14–1	**Lackey** (11–6)	Hutchison (6–9)		Rogers Centre	27,905	47–52	W5
100	July 22	@ Blue Jays	3–7	Happ (8–5)	**Peavy** (1–9)	Cecil (4)	Rogers Centre	29,269	47–53	L1
101	July 23	@ Blue Jays	4–6	Dickey (8–10)	**Buchholz** (5–6)	Janssen (15)	Rogers Centre	35,696	47–54	L2
102	July 24	@ Blue Jays	0–8	Stroman (6–2)	**De La Rosa** (3–3)		Rogers Centre	46,683	47–55	L3
103	July 25	@ Rays	4–6	Price (11–7)	**Tazawa** (1–2)	McGee (10)	Tropicana Field	23,136	47–56	L4
104	July 26	@ Rays	0–3	Balfour (1–3)	**Lackey** (11–7)		Tropicana Field	26,659	47–57	L5
105	July 27	@ Rays	3–2	**Webster** (1–0)	Archer (6–6)	**Uehara** (21)	Tropicana Field	25,221	48–57	W1
106	July 28	Blue Jays	1–14	Dickey (9–10)	**Buchholz** (5–7)		**Fenway Park**	37,974	48–58	L1
107	July 29	Blue Jays	2–4	Stroman (7–2)	**De La Rosa** (3–4)	Janssen (17)	**Fenway Park**	38,275	48–59	L2
108	July 30	Blue Jays	1–6	Buehrle (11–7)	**Workman** (1–4)		**Fenway Park**	38,203	48–60	L3

August (12–16)

#	Date	Opponent	Score	Win	Loss	Save	Stadium	Attendance	Record	Box/ Streak
109	August 1	Yankees	4–3	**Ranaudo** (1–0)	Capuano (1–2)	**Uehara** (22)	**Fenway Park**	37,782	49–60	W1
110	August 2	Yankees	4–6	Kelley (2–3)	**Webster** (1–1)	Robertson (28)	**Fenway Park**	37,302	49–61	L1
111	August 3	Yankees	7–8	Rogers (1–0)	**Breslow** (2–3)	Robertson (29)	**Fenway Park**	38,035	49–62	L2
112	August 5	@ Cardinals	2–3	Neshek (5–0)	**Tazawa** (1–3)	Rosenthal (35)	Busch Stadium	43,432	49–63	L3
113	August 6	@ Cardinals	2–1	**Tazawa** (2–3)	Rosenthal (1–6)	**Uehara** (23)	Busch Stadium	42,733	50–63	W1
114	August 7	@ Cardinals	2–5	Wainwright (14–6)	**Workman** (1–5)	Neshek (3)	Busch Stadium	44,570	50–64	L1
115	August 8	@ Angels	4–2	**Webster** (2–1)	Weaver (12–7)	**Uehara** (24)	Angel Stadium	38,016	51–64	W1
116	August 9	@ Angels	4–5 (19)	Shoemaker (10–4)	**Workman** (1–6)		Angel Stadium	42,159	51–65	L1
117	August 10	@ Angels	3–1	**De La Rosa** (4–4)	Smith (4–1)	**Uehara** (25)	Angel Stadium	36,300	52–65	W1
118	August 12	@ Reds	3–2	**Layne** (1–0)	Broxton (4–1)	**Uehara** (26)	Great American Ball Park	35,903	53–65	W2
119	August 13	@ Reds	5–4	**Ranaudo** (2–0)	Leake (9–11)	**Mujica** (3)	Great American Ball Park	32,870	54–65	W3
120	August 14	Astros	9–4	**Webster** (3–1)	Feldman (6–9)		**Fenway Park**	38,065	55–65	W4
121	August 15	Astros	3–5 (10)	Sipp (3–2)	**Breslow** (2–4)		**Fenway Park**	37,016	55–66	L1
122	August 16	Astros	10–7	**Wilson** (1–0)	Fields (2–6)		**Fenway Park**	37,652	56–66	W1
123	August 17	Astros	1–8	McHugh (6–9)	**Kelly** (2–3)		**Fenway Park**	36,717	56–67	L1
124	August 18	Angels	2–4	Wilson (10–8)	**Workman** (1–7)	Jepsen (1)	**Fenway Park**	35,170	56–68	L2
125	August 19	Angels	3–4	Smith (5–1)	**Uehara** (5–3)	Street (34)	**Fenway Park**	35,471	56–69	L3
126	August 20	Angels	3–8	Rasmus (3–1)	**Buchholz** (5–8)		**Fenway Park**	35,136	56–70	L4
127	August 21	Angels	0–2	Shoemaker (12–4)	**De La Rosa** (4–5)	Grilli (12)	**Fenway Park**	36,160	56–71	L5
128	August 22	Mariners	3–5	Leone (6–2)	**Uehara** (5–4)	Rodney (37)	**Fenway Park**	36,433	56–72	L6
129	August 23	Mariners	3–7	Wilhelmsen (2–2)	**Workman** (1–8)		**Fenway Park**	36,905	56–73	L7
130	August 24	Mariners	6–8	Leone (7–2)	**Webster** (3–2)	Rodney (38)	**Fenway Park**	37,022	56–74	L8
131	August 25	@ Blue Jays	4–3 (10)	**Uehara** (6–4)	Sanchez (2–1)	**Breslow** (1)	Rogers Centre	26,041	57–74	W1
132	August 26	@ Blue Jays	11–7 (11)	**Tazawa** (3–3)	Janssen (3–2)		Rogers Centre	27,321	58–74	W2
133	August 27	@ Blue Jays	2–5	Stroman (8–5)	**Layne** (1–1)	Cecil (5)	Rogers Centre	30,285	58–75	L1
134	August 29	@ Rays	8–4	**Ranaudo** (3–0)	Archer (8–7)		Tropicana Field	16,107	59–75	W1
135	August 30	@ Rays	0–7	Odorizzi (10–11)	**Webster** (3–3)		Tropicana Field	17,463	59–76	L1
136	August 31	@ Rays	3–0	**Buchholz** (6–8)	Cobb (9–7)		Tropicana Field	16,822	60–76	W1

September (11–15)

#	Date	Opponent	Score	Win	Loss	Save	Stadium	Attendance	Record	Box/ Streak
137	September 1	@ Rays	3–4 (10)	Balfour (2–6)	**Badenhop** (0–3)		Tropicana Field	10,543	60–77	L1
138	September 2	@ Yankees	9–4	**Kelly** (3–3)	Greene (4–2)		Yankee Stadium	40,334	61–77	W1
139	September 3	@ Yankees	1–5	Kuroda (10–8)	**Ranaudo** (3–1)		Yankee Stadium	40,007	61–78	L1
140	September 4	@ Yankees	4–5	Warren (3–5)	**Uehara** (6–5)		Yankee Stadium	44,708	61–79	L2
141	September 5	Blue Jays	9–8 (10)	**Layne** (2–1)	Janssen (3–3)		**Fenway Park**	35,667	62–79	W1
142	September 6	Blue Jays	4–3	**Buchholz** (7–8)	Happ (9–9)	**Mujica** (4)	**Fenway Park**	36,677	63–79	W2
143	September 7	Blue Jays	1–3	Dickey (12–12)	**De La Rosa** (4–6)	Janssen (22)	**Fenway Park**	36,261	63–80	L1
144	September 8	Orioles	0–4	González (9–7)	**Kelly** (3–4)		**Fenway Park**	35,894	63–81	L2
145	September 9	Orioles	1–4	Tillman (12–5)	**Ranaudo** (3–2)	Britton (34)	**Fenway Park**	37,008	63–82	L3
146	September 10	Orioles	6–10	Chen (15–4)	**Workman** (1–9)		**Fenway Park**	35,374	63–83	L4
147	September 11	@ Royals	6–3	**Buchholz** (8–8)	Hendriks (1–2)	**Mujica** (5)	Kauffman Stadium	28,673	64–83	W1
148	September 12	@ Royals	4–2	**Webster** (4–3)	Ventura (12–10)	**Mujica** (6)	Kauffman Stadium	19,191	65–83	W2
149	September 13	@ Royals	1–7	Guthrie (11–11)	**De La Rosa** (4–7)		Kauffman Stadium	26,627	65–84	L1
150	September 14	@ Royals	8–4	**Kelly** (4–4)	Vargas (11–9)		Kauffman Stadium	19,065	66–84	W1
151	September 16	@ Pirates	0–4	Morton (6–12)	**Ranaudo** (3–3)		PNC Park	34,698	66–85	L1
152	September 17	@ Pirates	1–9	Liriano (6–10)	**Buchholz** (8–9)		PNC Park	34,785	66–86	L2
153	September 18	@ Pirates	2–3	Cole (10–5)	**Workman** (1–10)	Melancon (30)	PNC Park	36,862	66–87	L3
154	September 19	@ Orioles	5–3 (10)	**Tazawa** (4–3)	O'Day (5–2)	**Mujica** (7)	Camden Yards	39,079	67–87	W1
155	September 20	@ Orioles	2–7	Tillman (13–5)	**De La Rosa** (4–8)		Camden Yards	43,015	67–88	L1
156	September 21	@ Orioles	3–2	**Kelly** (5–4)	González (9–9)	**Mujica** (8)	Camden Yards	38,329	68–88	W1
157	September 23	Rays	2–6	Cobb (10–8)	**Buchholz** (8–10)		**Fenway Park**	35,566	68–89	L1
158	September 24	Rays	11–3	**Ranaudo** (4–3)	Odorizzi (11–13)		**Fenway Park**	35,741	69–89	W1
159	September 25	Rays	11–1	**Webster** (5–3)	Hellickson (1–5)		**Fenway Park**	36,590	70–89	W2
160	September 26	Yankees	2–3	Capuano (3–4)	**Wright** (0–1)	Robertson (39)	**Fenway Park**	37,605	70–90	L1
161	September 27	Yankees	10–4	**Kelly** (6–4)	Tanaka (13–5)		**Fenway Park**	37,147	71–90	W1
162	September 28	Yankees	5–9	Pineda (5–5)	**Buchholz** (8–11)		**Fenway Park**	36,879	71–91	L1

== Awards and honors ==
- Dustin Pedroia – Gold Glove Award (2B)

All-Star Game

- Jon Lester, reserve P
- Koji Uehara, reserve P (roster replacement)

== Farm system ==
Level	Team	League	Manager
AAA	Pawtucket Red Sox	International League	Kevin Boles
AA	Portland Sea Dogs	Eastern League	Billy McMillon
A-Advanced	Salem Red Sox	Carolina League	Carlos Febles
A	Greenville Drive	South Atlantic League	Darren Fenster
A-Short Season	Lowell Spinners	New York–Penn League	Joe Oliver
Rookie	GCL Red Sox	Gulf Coast League	Tom Kotchman
Rookie	DSL Red Sox	Dominican Summer League	José Zapata

LEAGUE CHAMPIONS: Pawtucket, GCL Red Sox
