= Heath Hembree =

American baseball player (born 1989)

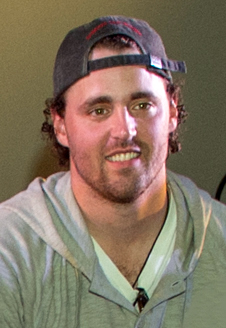
- Hembree in 2015
- Pitcher
- Born: January 13, 1989 (age 37); Spartanburg, South Carolina, U.S.
- Batted: Right Threw: Right

MLB debut
- September 3, 2013, for the San Francisco Giants

Last MLB appearance
- April 25, 2023, for the Tampa Bay Rays

MLB statistics
- Win–loss record: 21–13
- Earned run average: 4.37
- Strikeouts: 394
- Stats at Baseball Reference

Teams
- San Francisco Giants (2013); Boston Red Sox (2014–2020); Philadelphia Phillies (2020); Cincinnati Reds (2021); New York Mets (2021); Pittsburgh Pirates (2022); Los Angeles Dodgers (2022); Tampa Bay Rays (2023)

Career highlights and awards
- World Series champion (2018)

Richard Heath Hembree (born January 13, 1989), nicknamed Heater, is an American former professional baseball pitcher in Major League Baseball (MLB). Listed at 6 feet 4 inches (1.93 m) and 220 pounds (100 kg), Hembree throws and bats right-handed. He made his MLB debut with the San Francisco Giants in 2013 and also played for the Boston Red Sox, Philadelphia Phillies, Cincinnati Reds, New York Mets, Pittsburgh Pirates, Los Angeles Dodgers, and Tampa Bay Rays.

== Early years ==
Hembree played baseball and high school football at Broome High School in his hometown of Spartanburg, South Carolina. He was a standout pitcher and quarterback for Broome, but did not pitch as a senior in 2007, due to a knee injury suffered playing football. Instead, Hembree was a designated hitter his senior season; he had a .320 batting average.

== Amateur career ==
Hembree initially attended the University of South Carolina, but only had one pitching appearance his entire freshman season in 2008. He then transferred to Spartanburg Methodist College, which at the time was still a junior college that was part of the National Junior College Athletic Association. As a transfer sophomore, he went 7–0 with a 1.22 earned run average (ERA). After receiving a scholarship to the College of Charleston, an NCAA Division I school, Hembree transferred there, where he spent his final season of college baseball. He also pursued a degree in physical education.

== Professional career ==
=== San Francisco Giants ===
Hembree was drafted in the fifth round of the 2010 MLB draft by the San Francisco Giants.

2010

Hembree began his professional career in 2010, pitching for the rookie league Arizona League Giants and going 0–0 with a 0.82 ERA over 12 relief appearances, with 22 strikeouts and 3 saves in 11 innings pitched.

2011

Hembree began the 2011 season pitching for the High–A San Jose Giants, and was promoted to the Double-A Richmond Flying Squirrels in late June. He went a combined 1–1 with a 1.86 ERA over 54 relief appearances, with 78 strikeouts and 38 saves in 53 1/3 innings.

2012

During 2012, Hembree pitched for the San Jose Giants (5 games) and the Triple-A Fresno Grizzlies (39 games). Overall, he had a 4.19 ERA with 1–1 record, 15 saves, and 43 strikeouts in 43 innings pitched.

2013

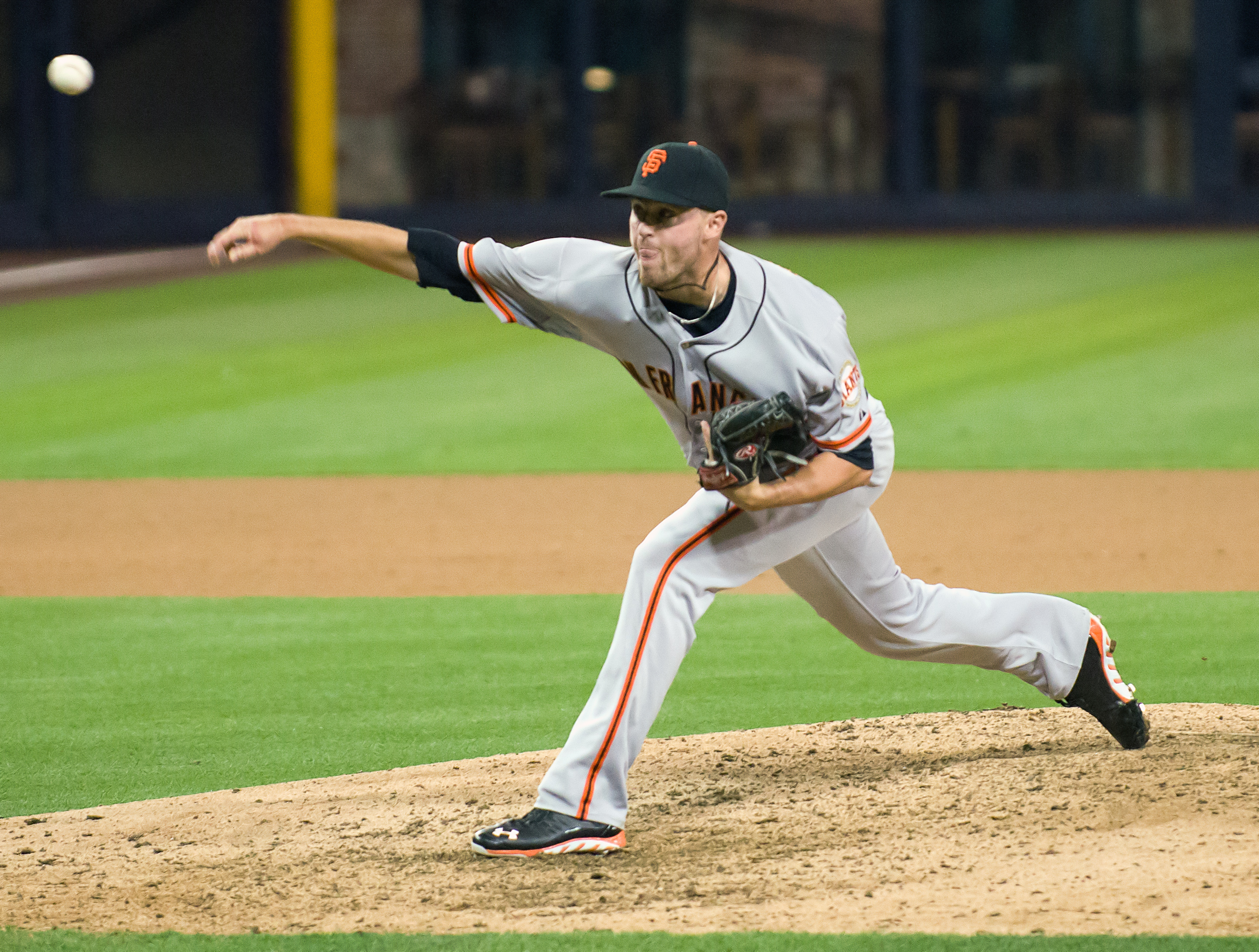
Hembree with the San Francisco Giants in 2013

Hembree spent most of 2013 with Triple-A Fresno, where he appeared in 54 games, compiling a 4.07 ERA with 1–4 record, 31 saves, and 63 strikeouts is 55 1/3 innings pitched.

Late in the season, Hembree was called up to the majors for the first time on September 3. He made his MLB debut that day, pitching a scoreless eighth inning in a 3–2 loss to the San Diego Padres. Hembree appeared in a total of nine MLB games for the 2013 Giants during September, giving up no runs in 7 2/3 innings pitched with 12 strikeouts.

2014

Hembree started the 2014 season with Triple-A Fresno, where he registered 18 saves in 41 appearances, with 3.89 ERA, 1–3 record, and 46 strikeouts in 39 1/3 innings pitched.

=== Boston Red Sox ===
Hembree was traded to the Boston Red Sox, along with Edwin Escobar, for Jake Peavy on July 26, 2014.

2014

Hembree made his Red Sox debut on August 9, wearing uniform number 38 and pitching four innings of scoreless relief in a 19-inning loss to the Los Angeles Angels; he gave up two hits, two walks, and struck out two. Due to the Red Sox signing Cuban outfielder Rusney Castillo on August 23, and guaranteeing Castillo the uniform number he wore in Cuba, which was 38, Hembree switched his uniform number to 37.

For the remainder of the season, Hembree split time between Boston and the Triple-A Pawtucket Red Sox. With Pawtucket, he made seven appearances with 2.70 ERA with nine strikeouts in 6 2/3 innings pitched, compiling an 0–1 record with two saves. He made a total of six MLB appearances for the 2014 Red Sox, striking out six in ten innings pitched, with a 4.50 ERA.

2015

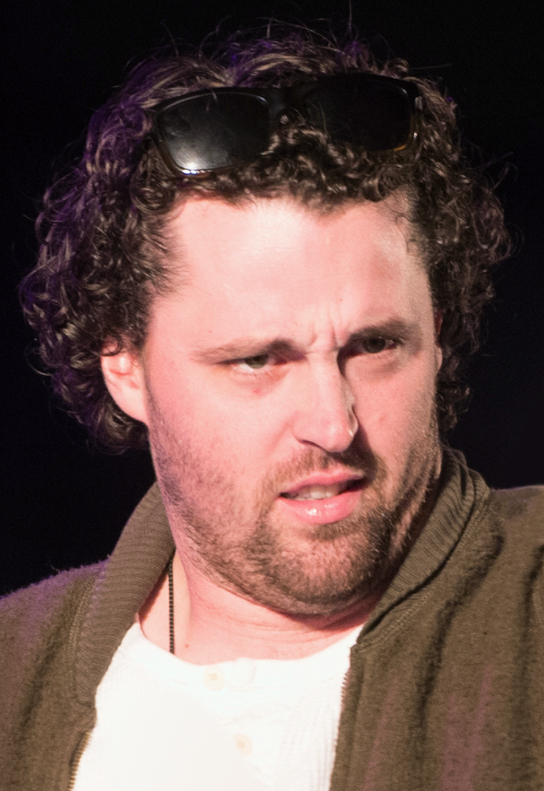
Hembree at a USO show in Germany in 2015

Hembree spent parts of 2015 with both Boston and Pawtucket. In Triple-A, he made 29 appearances, compiling an 0–5 record with 8 saves and 2.27 ERA, while striking out 32 in 31 2/3 innings pitched. With the 2015 Red Sox, he made 22 MLB appearances, striking out 15 in 25 1/3 innings pitched, while compiling a 3.55 ERA and 2–0 record.

2016

Hembree again split time between Boston and Pawtucket during 2016. He made 13 Triple-A appearances, registering 8 saves with 0.68 ERA and 22 strikeouts in 13 1/3 innings pitched. In 38 MLB appearances with the 2016 Red Sox, he compiled a 4–1 record with 2.65 ERA and 47 strikeouts in 51 innings pitched.

2017

With the 2017 Red Sox for the entire season, Hembree made 62 appearances, striking out 70 in 62 innings pitched, with a 3.63 ERA and 2–3 record.

2018

Hembree started the season as a member of the 2018 Red Sox, in his usual role as a member of Boston's bullpen. He finished 4–1 with a 4.10 ERA in 67 appearances, striking out 76 batters in 60 innings. Hembree was initially not included on Boston's postseason roster, but was added for the ALDS and beyond due to an injury to Steven Wright. Hembree made four appearances in the postseason, allowing no earned runs in 4 2/3 innings, as Boston won the World Series over the Los Angeles Dodgers.

2019

Hembree was included on Boston's Opening Day roster to start the 2019 season. He recorded his first MLB save on May 8, closing out an extra innings win over the Baltimore Orioles. Hembree was added to the injured list on June 14, retroactive to June 11, with a right elbow extensor strain; he returned to the team's active roster on July 4. He was again placed on the injured list on August 2, with right lateral elbow inflammation, and was activated on September 23. For the season with Boston, Hembree appeared in 45 games, recording a 3.86 ERA with 1–0 record and two saves, while striking out 46 in 39 2/3 innings.

2020

Hembree made 11 appearances with Boston during the start-delayed 2020 season, registering two wins and a 5.59 ERA.

=== Philadelphia Phillies ===
On August 21, 2020, Hembree was traded to the Philadelphia Phillies along with Brandon Workman and cash for Nick Pivetta and Connor Seabold. On August 23, 2020, Hembree made his Phillies debut.

In 2020, with the two teams combined, Hembree was 3–0 with a 9.00 ERA. He gave up the highest percentage of barrels per plate appearance of any major league pitcher, at 13.3%. He was outrighted to the Triple–A Lehigh Valley IronPigs on October 27, 2020, and elected free agency on October 30.

=== Cleveland Indians ===
On February 5, 2021, Hembree signed a minor league contract with the Cleveland Indians organization with an invitation to the Indians' major league spring training camp. On March 20, 2021, Hembree was released by the Indians.

=== Cincinnati Reds ===
On March 22, 2021, Hembree signed a minor league contract with the Cincinnati Reds organization that included an invitation to spring training. On April 23, 2021, Hembree was selected to the active roster. In 45 games for the Reds, Hembree struggled to 6.38 ERA with 68 strikeouts. On August 17, Hembree was designated for assignment by the Reds.

=== New York Mets ===
On August 20, 2021, Hembree was claimed off of waivers by the New York Mets. In 15 appearances for the Mets, Hembree pitched to a 3.45 ERA with 15 strikeouts and 1 save in 15.2 innings of work. He became a free agent following the season.

=== Pittsburgh Pirates ===
On March 15, 2022, Hembree signed a one-year contract with the Pittsburgh Pirates. He made 20 appearances for Pittsburgh, posting a 2-0 record and 7.16 ERA with 12 strikeouts in 16.1 innings pitched. On June 22, Hembree was designated for assignment by the Pirates. He was released on June 27.

=== Los Angeles Dodgers ===
On June 30, 2022, Hembree signed a minor league deal with the Los Angeles Dodgers. After beginning with Triple-A Oklahoma City Dodgers, he was called up to the majors on August 30. He pitched in six games for the Dodgers, allowing five earned runs in 5 2/3 innings before he was designated for assignment on September 13. On September 16, Hembree elected free agency in lieu of an outright assignment.

=== Tampa Bay Rays ===
On January 18, 2023, Hembree signed a minor league contract with the Tampa Bay Rays organization. He was assigned to the Triple-A Durham Bulls to begin the year, where he posted a 3-1 record and 1.29 ERA across 8 relief appearances. On April 25, Hembree had his contract selected to the active roster. That night, Hembree threw 1.1 scoreless innings of relief, punching out two hitters while walking one. He was designated for assignment the following day after the promotion of Zack Burdi. He elected free agency on April 28.

=== Detroit Tigers ===
On May 1, 2023, Hembree signed a minor league contract with the Detroit Tigers organization. He made 6 appearances for the Triple–A Toledo Mud Hens before suffering a forearm injury. On July 2, Hembree was released by the Tigers.

=== Seattle Mariners ===
On February 2, 2024, Hembree signed a minor league contract with the Seattle Mariners. He made 9 appearances split between the rookie–level Arizona Complex League Mariners, High–A Everett AquaSox, and Triple–A Tacoma Rainiers, accumulating a 4.32 ERA with 14 strikeouts across 8 1/3 innings pitched. Hembree was released by the Mariners organization on July 20.

== Personal life ==
Hembree and his wife Maci were married in 2017, they have two children.
