= Alfred M. Barbe High School =

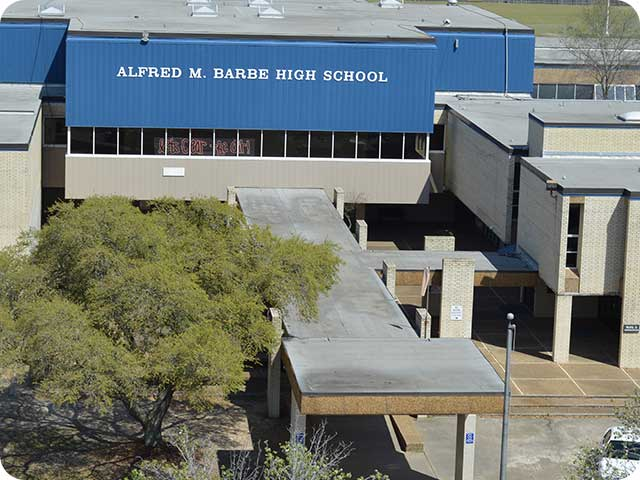

Location
- 2200 West McNeese; Lake Charles, Louisiana 70605; United States

Information
- Type: Public Secondary
- Motto: "Believe. Uphold. Care. Strive."
- Established: 1971
- School district: Calcasieu Parish Public Schools
- Principal: Patrick Fontenot
- Staff: 115.26 (on an FTE basis)
- Grades: 9–12
- Enrollment: 2,012 (2023–2024)
- Student to teacher ratio: 17.46
- Campus: Urban
- Colors: Columbia blue, navy, and white
- Mascot: Bucky the Buccaneer
- Nickname: Bucs
- Rival: Sulphur High School; LaGrange High School
- Yearbook: Les Memoires
- Website: Barbe High School

A.M. Barbe High School (/bɑːrb/ BARB) is a 5A public high school located in Lake Charles, Louisiana, United States. The students are offered a variety of Advanced Placement courses as well as opportunities for dual enrollment in classes within the school and at McNeese State University in Lake Charles, Louisiana. The school holds the title as having the largest enrollment in Advanced Placement courses in the entire State of Louisiana as well as having the highest scores on the exams. As of June 2019, the Principal is Patrick Fontenot. Barbe is in Calcasieu Parish Public Schools.

== History ==
Barbe High School first opened its doors on September 1, 1971. Construction continued throughout the first semester and was not completed until December. The first graduation ceremony was held in May 1973, with 260 graduates. At that time the school colors of blue and white were chosen and the Buccaneer was chosen as the mascot. The school, modeled after a junior college, consists of twelve permanent buildings that were originally constructed with the open classroom concept in mind. In 1980, Barbe added a science and art building as well as a new gym. Since then two new pod buildings, a new Stadium, and a Science and Business Building have been added, and the entire school has been completely renovated. The library and media building forms the center of the school, reflecting the importance of learning as the center of the schools philosophy.

== Athletics ==
Barbe High athletics competes in the LHSAA.

Barbe High School athletes participate in baseball, football and bowling and are the sports for which the school is best known. Barbe's other athletic teams include Color Guard, track, swimming, cheerleading, Bluebelles, soccer, volleyball, basketball (girls and boys), softball, Golf, Bowling, Rodeo, tennis and cross country.

=== Championships ===
The Barbe bowling team has won the state championship in 2008, 2010 and 2011.

The Barbe baseball team has won the state championship in 1998, 2000, 2001, 2006, and 2008, 2012, 2014, 2015, 2016, 2019, 2021 and 2023. They have also won the NIKE SPARQ national championship challenge. In 2014, they were National Champions. The baseball team has produced six 5A State MVP's. For the 2013–2014 school year, the Barbe baseball team was ranked number 1 in the U.S.

The football team went 9-3 the 2010 season. In 2012, they reached the State Championship Game in New Orleans, but lost to Rummel High School. They have won district and have made the playoffs almost every year.

== Notable alumni ==
- Garin Cecchini (2010), professional baseball player
- Gavin Cecchini (2012), professional baseball player. Played in 2006 Little League World Series
- Kyle DeBarge (2021), baseball player
- Hunter Feduccia (2017), professional baseball player.
- Mikey Freedom Hart (attended, did not graduate), Grammy award-winning musician (Midnights), songwriter, and producer (We Are).
- Joe Lawrence (1996), professional baseball player
- Wade LeBlanc (2003), professional baseball player
- Josh Prince (2006), professional baseball player
- Trey Quinn (2013), professional football player
- Justin Vincent (2003), MVP of the 2004 Sugar Bowl
