= Brandon Workman =

American baseball player (born 1988)

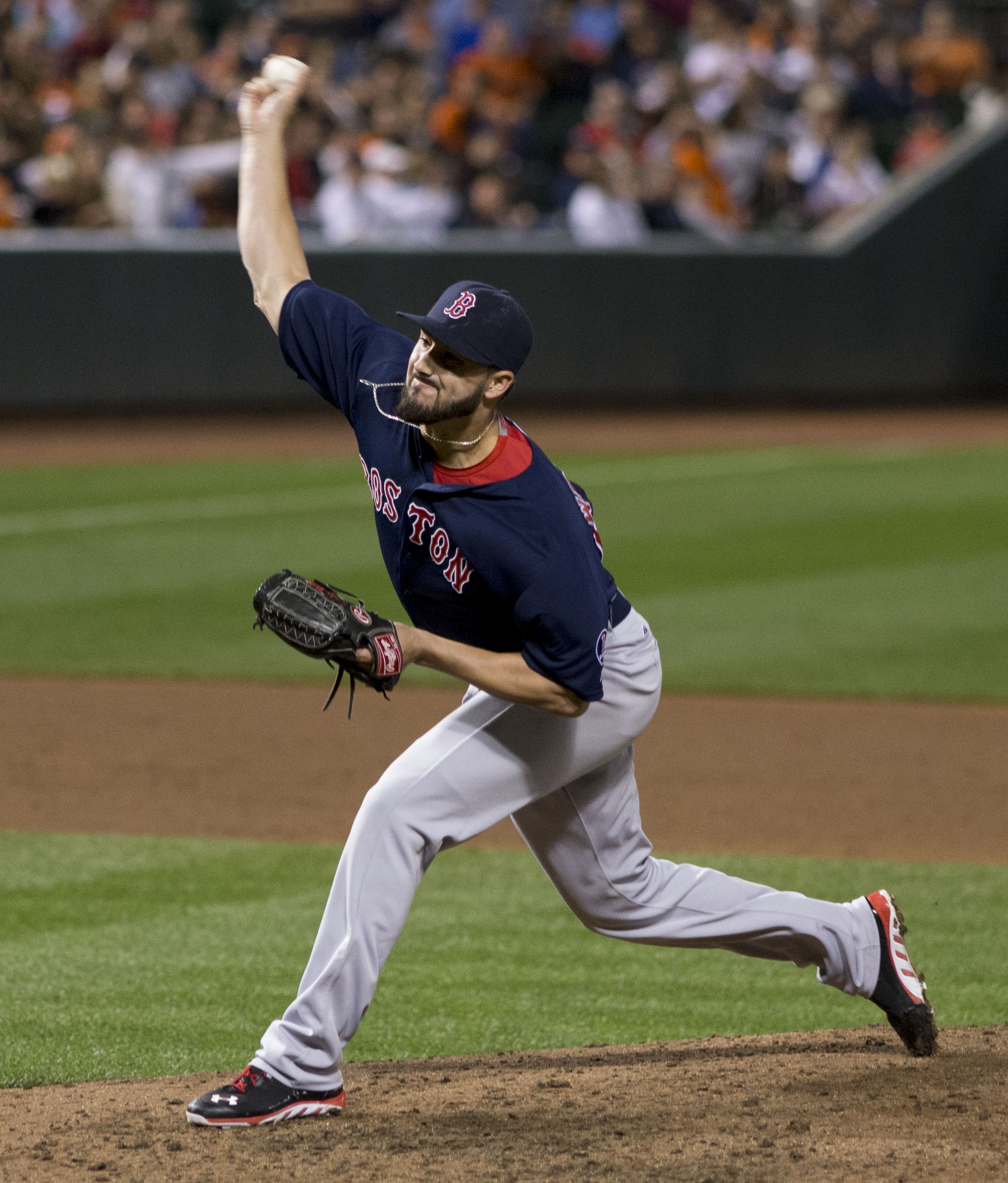
- Workman with the Red Sox in 2013
- Pitcher
- Born: August 13, 1988 (age 38); Arlington, Texas, U.S.
- Batted: Right Threw: Right

MLB debut
- July 10, 2013, for the Boston Red Sox

Last MLB appearance
- July 29, 2021, for the Boston Red Sox

MLB statistics
- Win–loss record: 26–22
- Earned run average: 4.02
- Strikeouts: 343
- Stats at Baseball Reference

Teams
- Boston Red Sox (2013–2014, 2017–2020); Philadelphia Phillies (2020); Chicago Cubs (2021); Boston Red Sox (2021)

Career highlights and awards
- World Series champion (2013)

Brandon Carlin Workman (born August 13, 1988) is an American former professional baseball pitcher. He made his Major League Baseball (MLB) debut in 2013 and played in MLB for the Boston Red Sox, Philadelphia Phillies, and Chicago Cubs. He throws and bats right-handed, and is listed at 6 feet 5 inches (1.96 m) and 235 pounds (107 kg).

== Amateur career ==
Workman attended Bowie High School in Bowie, Texas. He was a four-year letter winner, playing shortstop and pitcher. As a senior and captain of the team, Workman had a 10–2 win–loss record with a 0.81 earned run average (ERA) and 171 strikeouts in 76 innings. As a hitter, he batted .481, and earned first-team All-State honors twice, first-team Louisville Slugger High School All-American recognition, and Rawlings All-Region honors. Workman was drafted by the Philadelphia Phillies in the third round of the 2007 MLB draft, but opted to attend college.

Workman attended the University of Texas at Austin, where he played college baseball for the Texas Longhorns. During his freshman season, Workman went 5–2 and was named to the honor roll. During his sophomore season, Workman went 3–5 and held a 4.72 ERA in Big 12 Conference play. Workman would then have an excellent junior season, before entering the MLB draft. Workman also played for the Wareham Gatemen of the Cape Cod Baseball League in 2008 and 2009, and was a Cape Cod Baseball League All-Star, posting a 3.44 ERA as a freshman.

== Professional career ==
=== Boston Red Sox ===
==== Minor Leagues ====
The Red Sox drafted Workman in the second round (57th overall pick) of the 2010 MLB draft, and signed him for a signing bonus of $800,000. He spent the 2011 season with the Class A Greenville Drive, appearing in 26 games (all starts) with a 6–7 record and 3.71 ERA.

In 2012, Workman was named the Red Sox's 2012 Minor League Pitcher of the Year, after pitching 20 games (all starts) for the Salem Red Sox and leading the Class A-Advanced Carolina League in fewest baserunners per nine innings, while ranking second in walks plus hits per inning pitched (WHIP) and fourth in ERA. He was promoted to the Portland Sea Dogs of the Class AA Eastern League where he appeared in five games (all starts) and had a 3–1 record and 3.96 ERA.

Workman started the 2013 season with Portland, appearing in 11 games (10 starts) with a 5–1 record and 3.43 ERA. He was promoted to the Pawtucket Red Sox of the Class AAA International League, where he would appear in six games (all starts) with a 3–1 record and 2.80 ERA.

==== 2013 ====
Workman was promoted to Boston in July 2013, after a season-ending foot injury to Andrew Miller. In his major league debut against the Seattle Mariners on July 10, Workman pitched two innings in relief, gave up three runs, and struck out four. During his first start he brought a no-hitter into the seventh. He gave up his first hit and manager John Farrell let him stay in the game. He subsequently gave up two runs leading them to an extra inning loss. Through the remainder of the 2013 Red Sox season, Workman posted a 6–3 record with 4.97 ERA over 20 regular season appearances (3 starts), and did not allow an earned run during seven postseason appearances. He pitched a perfect 8th inning in the decisive Game 6 of the 2013 World Series, setting up Boston closer Koji Uehara. Workman also recorded his first professional at bat in Game 3 of the World Series, striking out on three consecutive pitches.

==== 2014 ====
On May 30, 2014, Workman was ejected from a game at Fenway Park after throwing a high pitch behind Evan Longoria of the Tampa Bay Rays. The incident occurred after Rays pitcher David Price had thrown at two Red Sox batters. On June 3, Workman was fined and suspended for six games. After losing an appeal, he began serving his suspension on June 18. Overall, for the 2014 Red Sox, Workman appeared in 19 games (15 starts) and had a 1–10 record with 5.17 ERA. He also appeared in 11 games (all starts) with Triple-A Pawtucket, compiling a 7–1 record with 4.11 ERA.

==== Tommy John surgery ====
In April 2015, Workman was placed on the disabled list with elbow soreness. He underwent a platelet-rich plasma (PRP) injection and was ordered not to throw for several weeks. When that was unsuccessful, he underwent Tommy John surgery in June 2015. As a result, he missed the entire 2015 season, and during the 2016 season made just ten appearances with Boston farm teams, pitching a total of 20 innings and giving up 17 earned runs (7.65 ERA).

==== 2017 ====
In December 2016, Workman signed a one-year contract worth $635,000 with the Red Sox. He was optioned to Triple-A Pawtucket to start the 2017 season; he would make 18 relief appearances with the PawSox, with a 1.55 ERA and 1.000 WHIP. Workman was called up by the Red Sox on May 2, and made his first MLB appearance since 2014 on May 4, pitching three scoreless innings. With the 2017 Red Sox, Workman posted a 3.18 ERA and 1.21 WHIP over 39 2/3 innings of relief work.

==== 2018 ====
In January 2018, Workman and the Red Sox avoided arbitration by agreeing to a one-year, $835,000 deal for the 2018 season. Having worn uniform number 67 with the Red Sox since his MLB debut, Workman changed to uniform number 44 for 2018. Workman was optioned to Triple-A Pawtucket prior to the start of the 2018 Boston Red Sox season, following limited success during spring training (9 appearances, 5.59 ERA, 1.76 WHIP). On June 5, Workman was called up to Boston after Drew Pomeranz was placed on the disabled list. Workman made 21 relief appearances during June and July, pitching 18 2/3 innings with a 2.89 ERA. He was returned to Triple-A on July 26, when the Red Sox added Nathan Eovaldi to the active roster.

Workman was recalled to Boston from July 31 until August 12, when Chris Sale was on the disabled list, making five relief appearances and allowing one run in 5 2/3 innings (1.59 ERA). Workman was again called up on August 18, when Sale went back on the disabled list. For the season, Workman made 43 relief appearances with Boston, compiling a 6–1 record with 3.27 ERA and 37 strikeouts in 41 1/3 innings. Workman was on Boston's postseason Roster for the ALDS and ALCS, making three relief appearances and allowing a combined five runs in one inning pitched. He was replaced on the roster by Pomeranz for the World Series, which the Red Sox went on to win over the Los Angeles Dodgers.

==== 2019 ====
Workman was included on Boston's Opening Day roster to start the 2019 season. For the season, he appeared in 73 games, compiling a 10–1 record with 16 saves, while striking out 104 batters in 71 2/3 innings. He finished the 2019 season as Boston’s closer, and was named AL Reliever of the Month for September when he pitched 11 1/3 innings without allowing an earned run and converted all seven save opportunities.

==== 2020 ====
Workman made seven appearances with Boston during the start-delayed 2020 season, registering four saves and a 4.05 ERA.

=== Philadelphia Phillies ===
On August 21, 2020, Workman was traded to the Philadelphia Phillies along with Heath Hembree and cash for Nick Pivetta and Connor Seabold. On August 22, Workman made his Phillies debut. On August 23, he earned his first Phillies save. On August 26, Workman earned the save against the Washington Nationals in back-to-back Phillies wins and manager Joe Girardi's 1,000th win as an MLB manager.

Workman struggled mightily during the Phillies' run for a playoff spot. He allowed 23 hits and 11 runs over 13 innings and had a record of 1–4. Statistically, he was one of the worst pitchers of the 2020 MLB season. He became a free agent following the season.

=== Chicago Cubs ===
On February 17, 2021, Workman agreed to a major league contract with the Chicago Cubs with a base salary of $1 million and an additional $2 million available in incentives. On April 29, 2021, Workman was designated for assignment after pitching to a 6.75 ERA, allowing 9 runs in 8 innings pitched. He was released on April 30.

=== Boston Red Sox (second stint) ===
On May 6, 2021, Workman signed a minor-league contract with the Boston Red Sox organization and was assigned to the Triple-A Worcester Red Sox. At the start of June, Workman opted out of his minor-league contract, triggering a two-day window for the Red Sox to either promote Workman to the major league roster or release him. On June 3, Workman was added to Boston's active roster, with Colten Brewer being designated for assignment to clear roster space. Workman made his 2021 Red Sox debut later that day; in closing out a 5–1 win against the Houston Astros, he allowed a home run by Yuli Gurriel. On July 29, Workman was designated for assignment to clear room on the 40-man roster for Kyle Schwarber. On August 1, Workman elected free agency. Overall in his second stint with the Red Sox, Workman made 19 relief appearances, pitching to a 1–0 record with 4.95 ERA while striking out 14 batters in 20 innings.

=== Texas Rangers ===
On March 14, 2022, Workman signed a minor league contract with the Texas Rangers. Workman was released by the Rangers organization on April 5.

Workman retired from professional baseball in May 2022 and is currently working as a real estate agent, according to his Linkedin.

== Personal life ==
Workman grew up a Texas Rangers fan. He and Taylor Caswell were engaged in March 2015, and married on November 21, 2015 in Wichita Falls, Texas. They have one son together.
