= Garin Cecchini =

American baseball player (born 1991)

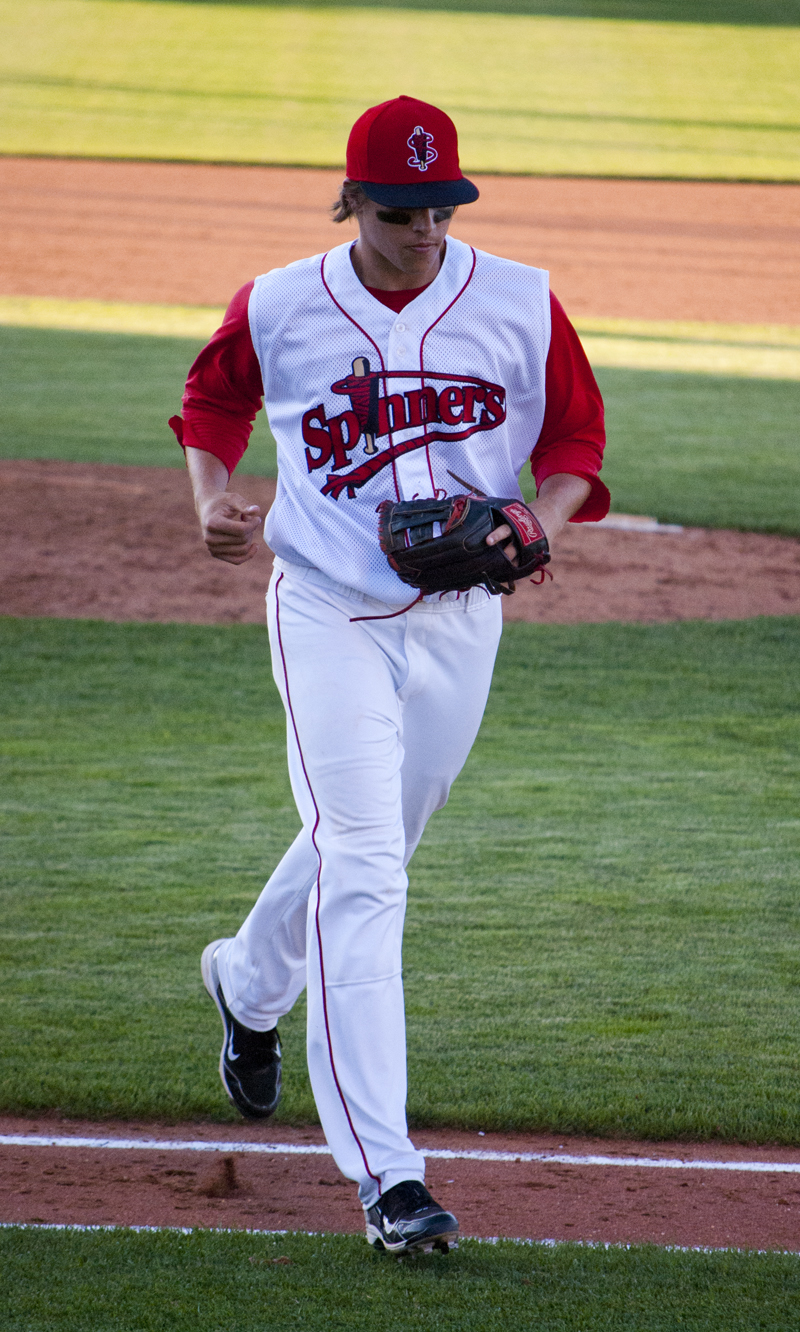
- Cecchini with the Lowell Spinners
- Third baseman
- Born: April 20, 1991 (age 35); Sulphur, Louisiana, U.S.
- Batted: Left Threw: Right

MLB debut
- June 1, 2014, for the Boston Red Sox

Last MLB appearance
- August 16, 2015, for the Boston Red Sox

MLB statistics
- Batting average: .229
- Home runs: 1
- Runs batted in: 4
- Stats at Baseball Reference

Teams
- Boston Red Sox (2014–2015)

Garin Glenn Cecchini (/ˈɡɛərɪn tʃɪˈkiːni/ GAIR-in chih-KEE-nee; born April 20, 1991) is an American former professional baseball third baseman. He played in Major League Baseball (MLB) for the Boston Red Sox in 2014 and 2015. Listed at 6 feet 3 inches (1.91 m) and 220 pounds (100 kg), he batted left-handed and threw right-handed. He is the older brother of infielder Gavin Cecchini.

== Professional career ==
=== Boston Red Sox ===
==== Minor leagues ====
Cecchini was selected by the Red Sox in the fourth round of the 2010 draft out of Alfred M. Barbe High School in Lake Charles, Louisiana. He started his professional career in 2011 with the Low–A Lowell Spinners. Cecchini was batting .298 in his first 32 games, while leading the New York–Penn League in doubles (12) and ranking fourth in stolen bases (12) and fifth in runs batted in (23), but suffered an injury and went on the disabled list for the rest of the season. Before being injured, he gained recognition as NYP Player of the Week on July 25 and was named to the NYP Mid-Season All-Star team on August 16. Following the 2011 season, Cecchini was ranked by Baseball America as the best hitter for batting average in the Red Sox minor league system.

Cecchini was named the Red Sox's No. 10 prospect by MLB.com entering the 2012 campaign. He gained a promotion to the Single–A Greenville Drive of the South Atlantic League. He responded by batting a slash line (BA/OBP/SLG) of .305/.394/.433 in 118 games, while ending 3rd both in doubles (38) and stolen bases (53), 5th in runs scored (84), and 6th in hits (139).

Cecchini started the 2013 season with High–A Salem Red Sox and was promoted to Double–A Portland Sea Dogs during the midseason. After a blistering start with Salem, during which Cecchini put up a line of .350/.469/.547 in 214 at-bats, he slowed down somewhat with the Sea Dogs, but he was able to put together a very respectable line of .296/.420/.404 in 240 at-bats for the rest of the season. He posted a collective .322 average and a .443 OBP, both of which were second-best in the organization behind Alex Hassan (.338/.457). Later in the year, he was honored with the Dernell Stenson Sportsmanship Award.

In November 2013, Cecchini's contract was purchased by the Red Sox and he was added to the 40-man roster.

==== Major leagues ====
Cecchini was called up to Boston on June 1, 2014. The move was expected to be short-term until the team activated Stephen Drew. Cecchini made his Major League debut the same day taking over third base after Dustin Pedroia was ejected in the third inning. Cecchini went 1-for-2 with an RBI in his major league debut, but was optioned back to the Triple-A Pawtucket Red Sox the next day. Cecchini was recalled again on June 17, as the team designated Grady Sizemore for assignment to clear a roster spot for Cecchini. On June 20, Cecchini was optioned back to Triple–A to make room for a returning Félix Doubront.

On December 4, 2015, Cecchini was designated for assignment by the Red Sox.

=== Milwaukee Brewers ===
Cecchini was traded by the Red Sox to the Milwaukee Brewers for cash on December 10, 2015. He spent the entirety of the 2016 campaign with the Triple–A Colorado Springs SkySox, hitting .271/.326/.380 with five home runs, 52 RBI, and 13 stolen bases. On October 28, 2016, Cecchini was removed from the 40–man roster and sent outright to Colorado Springs. He elected free agency following the season on November 7.

=== Kansas City Royals ===
On December 20, 2016, Cecchini signed a minor league contract with the Kansas City Royals. In 89 games for the Triple–A Omaha Storm Chasers, he batted .266/.296/.393 with 4 home runs and 33 RBI. Cecchini elected free agency following the season on November 6, 2017.
