= Gavin Cecchini =

American baseball player (born 1993)

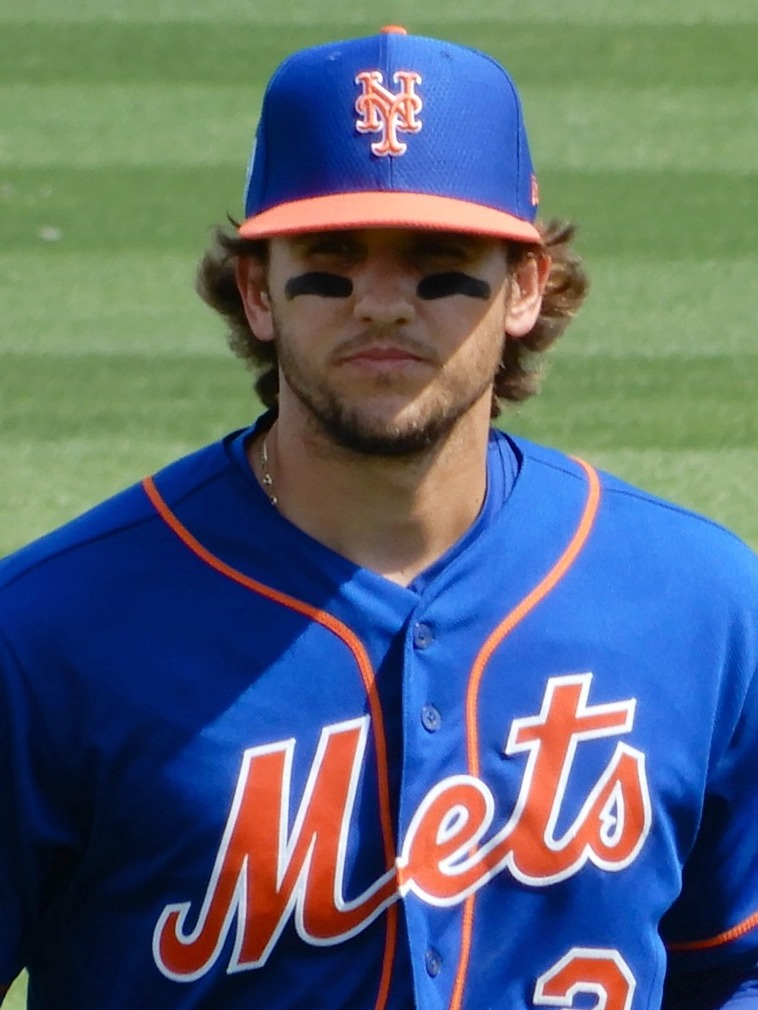
- Cecchini with the New York Mets in 2019
- Second Baseman
- Born: Gavin Glenn Christopher Joseph Cecchini; December 22, 1993 (age 32); Lake Charles, Louisiana, U.S.
- Batted: Right Threw: Right

MLB debut
- September 11, 2016, for the New York Mets

Last MLB appearance
- October 1, 2017, for the New York Mets

MLB statistics
- Batting average: .217
- Home runs: 1
- Runs batted in: 9
- Stats at Baseball Reference

Teams
- New York Mets (2016–2017)

Gavin Glenn Christopher Joseph Cecchini (/ˈɡeɪvɪn tʃɪˈkiːni/ GAY-vin chih-KEE-nee; born December 22, 1993) is an American former professional baseball second baseman. He played in Major League Baseball (MLB) for the New York Mets.

== Early life ==
Cecchini was born in Lake Charles, Louisiana, and attended Alfred M. Barbe High School. Prior to the 2012 MLB draft, Cecchini was regarded by Perfect Game as "good athlete, highest level hitter and outstanding middle infield tools."

Cecchini was a member of the South Lake Charles Little League team that represented Lake Charles, Louisiana and the Southwest region at the 2006 Little League World Series.

Cecchini initially committed to play college baseball for the LSU Tigers, before switching his commitment to Ole Miss. He was drafted by the Mets in the first round of the 2012 MLB Draft with the 12th overall pick.

== Professional career ==
=== New York Mets ===
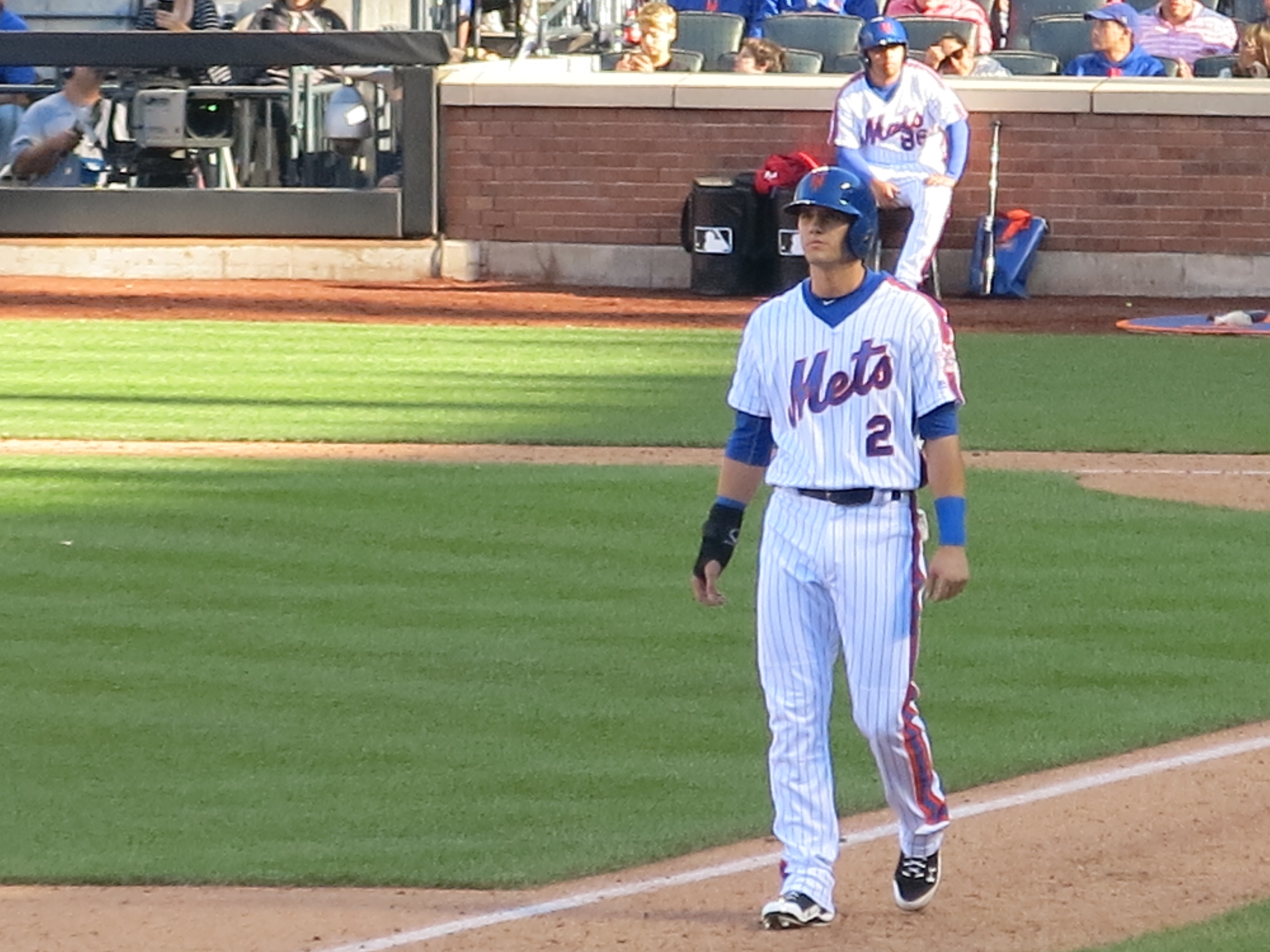
Cecchini with the Mets in 2016

Cecchini began his professional career in 2012 with the Kingsport Mets of the Appalachian League, batting .246/.311/.330, and then was promoted to Brooklyn Cyclones for five games in which he was hitless to end the season. Baseball America ranked him as the #2 prospect in the Mets system and the Appalachian League's #12 prospect following the 2012 season. He began the 2014 baseball season as a member of the Savannah Sand Gnats of the Single–A South Atlantic League, and for three teams in aggregate he batted .247/.328/.378.

He was promoted to the Major Leagues on September 6, 2016. He made his Major League debut on September 11, striking out in a pinch hit appearance at Turner Field. On September 24, he hit his first career hit, an RBI double. For the season, he batted .208/.253/.273.

Cecchini was designated for assignment on January 28, 2019 following the signing of Justin Wilson. He cleared waivers and was sent outright to the Triple–A Syracuse Mets on February 1, and received an invitation to spring training. After recovering from injury, he was assigned to the Double–A Binghamton Rumble Ponies. In 43 games for Binghamton, Cecchini hit .245/.295/.331 with three home runs, 21 RBI, and three stolen bases. He elected free agency following the season on November 4.

=== Canberra Cavalry ===
On November 8, 2019, Cecchini signed with the Canberra Cavalry of the Australian Baseball League. He abruptly quit his contract with the Canberra Cavalry due to concerns about air pollution caused by bushfires.

=== Arizona Diamondbacks ===
On January 29, 2020, Cecchini signed a minor league deal with the Arizona Diamondbacks. He was released on May 22, 2020.

=== Sugar Land Skeeters ===
In July 2020, Cecchini signed on to play for the Sugar Land Skeeters of the Constellation Energy League (a makeshift 4-team independent league created as a result of the COVID-19 pandemic) for the 2020 season. In 23 games he struggled hitting .213/.289/.307 with 1 home run and 10 RBIs.

=== Los Angeles Angels ===
On May 12, 2021, Cecchini signed a minor league contract with the Los Angeles Angels organization. He split the season between the Double–A Rocket City Trash Pandas and Triple–A Salt Lake Bees. In 91 games between the two affiliates, Cecchini batted .259/.290/.358 with 5 home runs, 36 RBI, and 7 stolen bases. He elected free agency following the season on November 7.

== Personal life ==
He is the younger brother of Major League infielder Garin Cecchini.
