= Connor Seabold =

American baseball player (born 1996)

- Seabold with the Omaha Storm Chasers in 2026

Free agent
- Pitcher
- Born: January 24, 1996 (age 30); Laguna Hills, California, U.S.
- Bats: Right Throws: Right

Professional debut
- MLB: September 11, 2021, for the Boston Red Sox
- KBO: March 23, 2024, for the Samsung Lions

MLB statistics (through 2026 season)
- Win–loss record: 2–11
- Earned run average: 7.36
- Strikeouts: 116

KBO statistics (through 2024 season)
- Win–loss record: 11-6
- Earned run average: 3.43
- Strikeouts: 158
- Stats at Baseball Reference

Teams
- Boston Red Sox (2021–2022); Colorado Rockies (2023); Samsung Lions (2024); Tampa Bay Rays (2025); Atlanta Braves (2025); Detroit Tigers (2026); Toronto Blue Jays (2026); Kansas City Royals (2026)

Connor Seabold (born January 24, 1996) is an American professional baseball pitcher who is a free agent. He has previously played in Major League Baseball (MLB) for the Boston Red Sox, Colorado Rockies, Tampa Bay Rays, Atlanta Braves, Detroit Tigers, Toronto Blue Jays, and Kansas City Royals, and in the KBO League for the Samsung Lions. Listed at 6 feet 2 inches (1.88 m) and 190 pounds (86 kg), he throws and bats right-handed.

== Amateur career ==
Seabold attended Newport Harbor High School in Newport Beach, California. In 2013, as a junior, he had a 2–6 win–loss record with a 1.97 earned run average (ERA). As a senior in 2014, he pitched to a 3.80 ERA, striking out 57 batters in 46 innings pitched. He was selected by the Baltimore Orioles in the 19th round of the Major League Baseball (MLB) 2014 draft, but did not sign and instead chose to enroll at California State University, Fullerton, where he played college baseball.

In 2015, as a freshman at Cal State Fullerton, Seabold appeared in 22 games (making 11 starts), going 5–4 with a 3.26 ERA in 69 innings, striking out 76 while walking only 12. As a sophomore in 2016, Seabold became the Titan's Friday night starter a month into the year, pitching to a 7–6 record with a 2.48 ERA in 16 games (13 starts), striking out 96 and walking only nine in 83 innings. He was named to the All-Big West Conference second team. After the season, he played in the Cape Cod Baseball League for the Yarmouth–Dennis Red Sox, helping them win the league championship. In 2017, as a junior, Seabold started 18 games, going 11–5 with a 2.96 ERA, earning a spot on the All-Big West Conference first team.

== Professional career ==
=== Philadelphia Phillies ===
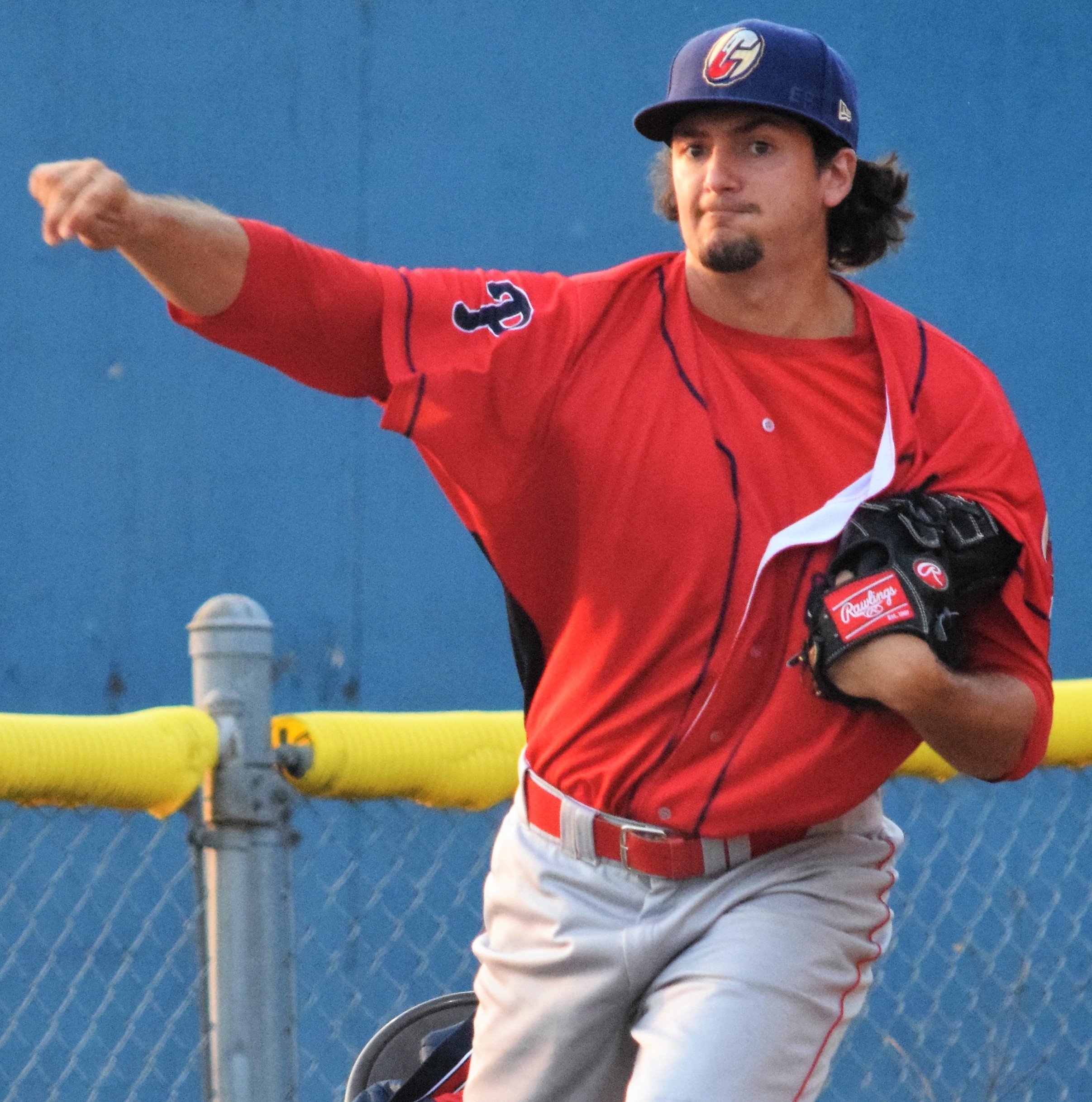
Seabold with the Williamsport Crosscutters in 2017

After Seabold's junior year, he was selected by the Philadelphia Phillies in the third round (83rd overall) of the 2017 MLB draft. He signed with the Phillies for $525,000 and made his professional debut with the Williamsport Crosscutters of the Low–A New York–Penn League, pitching to a 0.90 ERA over 10 innings. In 2018, he began the year with the Clearwater Threshers of the High–A Florida State League before earning a promotion to the Reading Fightin Phils of the Double-A Eastern League in June. Over 23 starts between the two clubs, he compiled a 5–8 record with a 4.28 ERA and a 1.11 WHIP as he struck out 132 batters in 130 1/3 innings pitched. In 2019, he returned to Reading to begin the season, and also spent time back with Clearwater. Over seven starts with Reading, he went 3–1 with a 2.25 ERA, while compiling a 1.00 ERA over two games with Clearwater. He missed time during the year with an oblique injury. After the season, he made four starts in the Arizona Fall League for the Scottsdale Scorpions, going 1–0 with a 1.06 ERA as he struck out 22 batters in 17 innings. In October, he was selected to the United States national baseball team for the 2019 WBSC Premier12, but he did not pitch in the tournament.

=== Boston Red Sox ===
On August 21, 2020, Seabold was traded to the Boston Red Sox, along with Nick Pivetta, in exchange for Brandon Workman, Heath Hembree and cash. On November 20, 2020, he was added to Boston's 40-man roster. Seabold began the 2021 season on the injured list due to elbow soreness. He returned to pitching in July and was assigned to the Triple-A Worcester Red Sox. On September 11, Seabold was added to Boston's active roster to make his major league debut. He started that night against the Chicago White Sox at Guaranteed Rate Field, allowing two runs on three hits in three innings, and was optioned back to Worcester the next day. In 11 starts with Worcester, Seabold compiled a 3.50 ERA and a 4–3 record while striking out 52 batters in 54 innings. After the regular season, Seabold was selected to play in the Arizona Fall League.

Seabold began the 2022 season in Triple-A with Worcester. He was added to Boston's active roster for a start against the Toronto Blue Jays on June 27; after taking the loss, he was optioned back to Worcester. He was recalled by Boston on July 3 for a start at Wrigley Field, resulting in a no decision, and optioned back to Triple-A the next day. He was recalled on July 8, when Michael Wacha was placed on the injured list. The next day, Seabold himself was added to the injured list with a right forearm extensor strain. Seabold was optioned back to Worcester in late July, and recalled to Boston for a week in late September. In five starts with Boston, Seabold went 0–4 with an 11.29 ERA while striking out 19 batters in 18 1/3 innings.

On January 12, 2023, Seabold was designated for assignment following the signing of Corey Kluber.

=== Colorado Rockies ===
On January 17, 2023, Seabold was traded to the Colorado Rockies in exchange for a player to be named later or cash. After struggling to a 7.18 ERA in 20 games, Seabold was demoted to the bullpen on July 20. On December 6, Seabold was released by the Rockies.

=== Samsung Lions ===
On December 22, 2023, Seabold signed a one-year, $900,000 contract with the Samsung Lions of the KBO League. In 28 starts for the Lions in 2024, he posted a 11–6 record with a 3.43 ERA and 158 strikeouts across 160 innings. Seabold became a free agent following the season.

=== Tampa Bay Rays ===
On February 7, 2025, Seabold signed a minor league contract with the Tampa Bay Rays. He was assigned to the Triple-A Durham Bulls to begin the year. On May 9, the Rays selected Seabold's contract, adding him to their active roster. In three appearances for Tampa Bay, he recorded a 1.35 ERA with five strikeouts across 6 2/3 innings pitched. Seabold was designated for assignment by the Rays on August 8.

=== Atlanta Braves ===
On August 10, 2025, Seabold was claimed off waivers by the Atlanta Braves. In four appearances for Atlanta, he struggled to a 9.82 ERA with five strikeouts across 3 2/3 innings pitched. Seabold was designated for assignment by the Braves on September 22. He cleared waivers and was sent outright to the Triple-A Gwinnett Stripers on September 24. Seabold elected free agency on November 2.

=== Detroit Tigers ===
On January 21, 2026, Seabold signed a minor league contract with the Toronto Blue Jays. He was released by the Blue Jays prior to the start of the regular season on March 21. Seabold signed a split contract with the Detroit Tigers two days later. Seabold made the active roster out of spring training but landed on the 15-day injured list on April 26 with an ankle injury. He made 11 appearances for Detroit, posting a 1-0 record and 3.45 ERA with 14 strikeouts across 15 2/3 innings pitched. Seabold was designated for assignment by the Tigers on May 24.

=== Toronto Blue Jays ===
On May 27, 2026, Seabold was traded to the Toronto Blue Jays in exchange for Juanmi Vasquez. He made five appearances for Toronto, struggling to an 8.10 ERA with one strikeout across 3 1/3 innings pitched. Seabold was designated for assignment by the Blue Jays on June 10.

=== Kansas City Royals ===
On June 15, 2026, Seabold was traded to the Kansas City Royals in exchange for Denis Samudio and cash considerations. He made five appearances for Kansas City, struggling to a 9.00 ERA with five strikeouts across five innings pitched. On July 1, Seabold was placed on the injured list due to a strained right lat muscle. He was transferred to the 60–day injured list on August 3. On October 23, Seabold was removed from the 40–man roster and sent outright to the minors; he subsequently elected free agency.

== Personal life ==
Seabold has two younger brothers, Cade and Carson; their mother died in August 2015 at age 45 following a battle with cancer.
