= Steven Wright (baseball) =

American baseball player (born 1984)

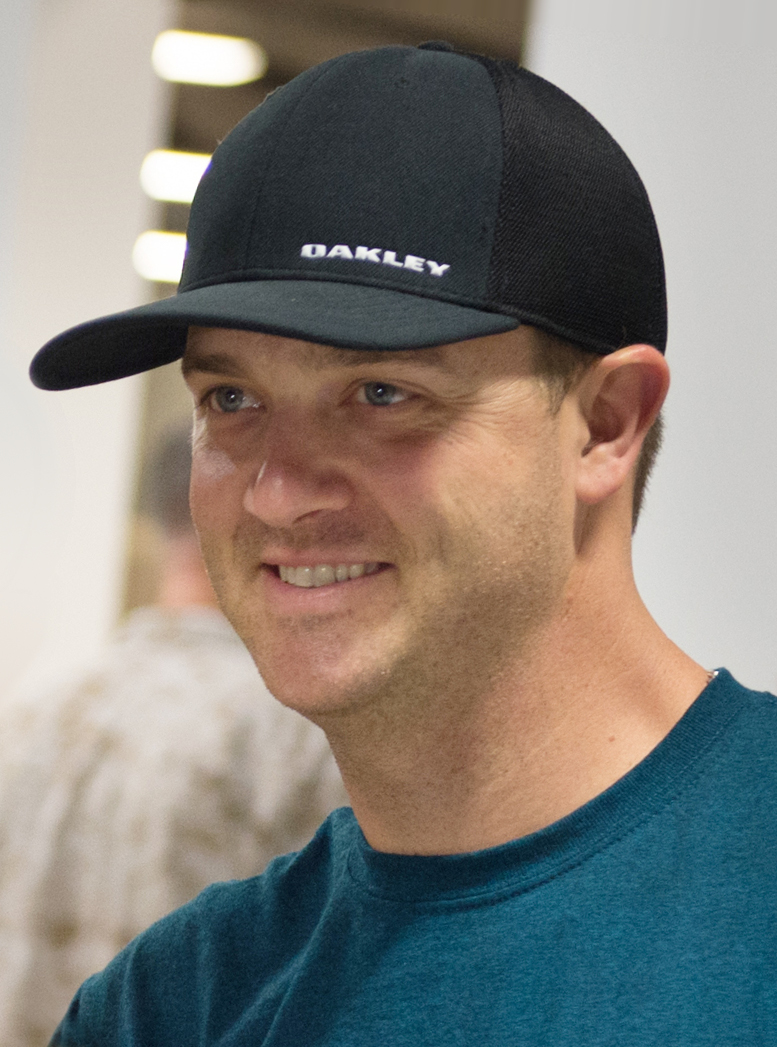
- Wright in 2015
- Pitcher
- Born: August 30, 1984 (age 42); Torrance, California, U.S.
- Batted: Right Threw: Right

MLB debut
- April 23, 2013, for the Boston Red Sox

Last MLB appearance
- July 13, 2019, for the Boston Red Sox

MLB statistics
- Win–loss record: 24–16
- Earned run average: 3.86
- Strikeouts: 271
- Stats at Baseball Reference

Teams
- Boston Red Sox (2013–2019)

Career highlights and awards
- All-Star (2016)

Steven Richard Wright (born August 30, 1984) is an American former professional baseball pitcher. Wright played in Major League Baseball (MLB) for the Boston Red Sox, having made his MLB debut in 2013; he was an All-Star in 2016, and played for the team through 2019. He is known for his knuckleball pitch.

Wright received two World Series rings as a member of the Red Sox, having been a member of the 2013 and 2018 championship teams, although he did not appear in the postseason in either year.

== Amateur baseball career ==
Born in Torrance, California, Wright attended Valley View High School in Moreno Valley, California and the University of Hawaii. While at Hawaii, Wright was named a second-team All-American as a junior in 2006. He had an 11–2 record with a 2.30 ERA in 110 innings. In 2005, he played collegiate summer baseball with the Orleans Cardinals of the Cape Cod Baseball League, where he was named a league all-star and helped Orleans to the 2005 league championship.

== Professional career ==
=== Cleveland Indians ===
The Cleveland Indians selected Wright in the second round of the 2006 MLB draft. From 2007 to 2012, Wright played Minor League Baseball with the Lake County Captains, Kinston Indians, Akron Aeros, and Columbus Clippers, all affiliates of the Cleveland Indians. With the 2008 Akron Aeros, he pitched a career-high 75 1/3 innings.

Wright has a 90-mph fastball, but he turned to the knuckleball as his primary pitch in the 2011 season as a collective decision among Wright and the Indians.

=== Boston Red Sox ===
On July 31, 2012, the Indians traded Wright to the Boston Red Sox in exchange for Lars Anderson at the trade deadline.

After an injury to Boston relief pitcher Joel Hanrahan in April 2013, the Red Sox called Wright up to the major leagues. Wright's first major league experience was against the Indians, the team that traded him in 2012, but he saw no action in the three-game series.

==== 2013 ====
On April 23, 2013, Wright was called into a game versus the Oakland Athletics to relieve Alfredo Aceves. The first batter he faced, Brandon Moss, hit into a double play. Wright allowed five runs in 3 2/3 innings, and was optioned to Triple-A Pawtucket after the game.

On July 11, Wright earned his first major league win, against the Seattle Mariners. Wright pitched 5 2/3 shutout innings in relief of Ryan Dempster. Koji Uehara picked up the save, and presented Wright with the ball following the victory. On August 1, Wright picked up his second win, also against the Mariners and again in relief of Dempster; Boston trailed 7–2 entering the ninth inning, but staged a comeback to walk off with an 8–7 victory, making Wright the winner. On August 6, while pitching in his first major league start, Wright's knuckleball caused catcher Ryan Lavarnway to tie a major league record with four passed balls in one inning. The record was originally set by Ray Katt of the New York Giants in 1954, catching knuckleballer Hoyt Wilhelm, and tied by Gino Petralli of the Texas Rangers in 1987, catching knuckleballer Charlie Hough.

Wright made four MLB appearances with one start during the season, accumulating a 5.40 ERA and a 2–0 record. He was also the recipient of the Red Sox' Lou Gorman Award. Wright was not included on the team's postseason roster.

==== 2014 ====
Wright began the 2014 season with Triple-A Pawtucket, going 5–3 with a 2.76 ERA before being recalled to Boston on August 17. In six major league games with the Red Sox, Wright made one start, going 0–1 with a 2.57 ERA in 21 innings pitched.

==== 2015 ====
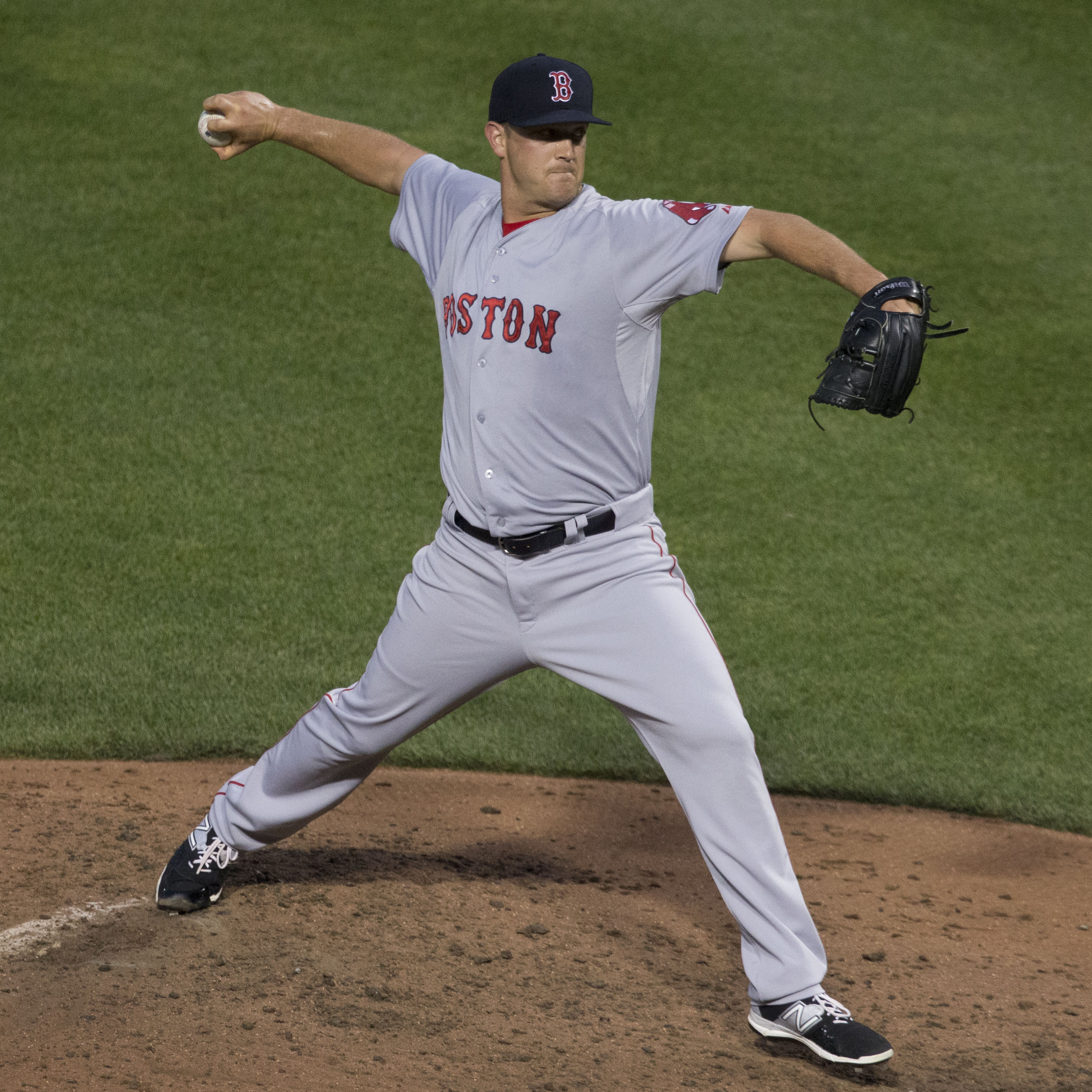
Wright with the Boston Red Sox in 2015

During a game started on April 10, 2015, against the Yankees, after a home run by Chase Headley in the bottom of the ninth pushed the game into extra innings, Wright, the intended starter for the next day, entered in the bottom of the 15th. Although yielding a tying run in both the 16th and 18th innings, Wright became the winning pitcher after five innings of relief. It was the longest game then played at the new Yankee Stadium, ending after 19 innings at 2:13 am with a 6–5 score, after six hours and 49 minutes (with an additional 16-minute delay due to a series of faulty stadium lights going out during the 12th inning). Later that morning, Wright was optioned to Triple-A Pawtucket to make room for the returning Joe Kelly. Wright finished his MLB season with a 5–4 record, a 4.09 ERA, and 72 2/3 innings pitched.

==== 2016 ====
On May 8, 2016, Wright pitched a complete game for the first time in his MLB career as the Red Sox won 5–1 over the Yankees. Wright gave up only three hits, struck out seven, and the lone run came on a solo home run by Brett Gardner with two outs in the ninth inning. Wright earned his first All-Star game nod, going 9–5 before the game, recording the lowest ERA of any AL starting pitcher before the break. On August 14, he was placed on the 15-day disabled list with bursitis in his right shoulder. He ended the 2016 season with a 13–6 record and 3.33 ERA after pitching 156 2/3 innings in 24 starts.

==== 2017 ====
On May 4, 2017, it was announced that Wright would undergo left knee surgery for a cartilage restoration, therefore ending his season. He had made five appearances (all starts) with a 1–3 record and 8.25 ERA in 24 innings pitched.

==== 2018 ====
On March 23, 2018, MLB announced that Wright would be suspended for 15 games for violating the league's personal conduct policy. The suspension took effect on April 28, when Wright completed a rehabilitation assignment with Triple-A Pawtucket.

On May 14, Wright was activated by Boston, his suspension having been completed. After 10 appearances (including four starts), he was placed on the disabled list with a left knee injury on June 26; he received a PRP injection in the knee on July 2. Wright was sent on a rehabilitation assignment with Triple-A Pawtucket on August 28, and returned from the disabled list on September 1.

Overall in 2018, Wright pitched 53 2/3 innings over 20 appearances (including four starts), compiling a 3–1 record and 2.68 ERA. He also picked up his only MLB save on September 16, 2018 against the Mets. Initially included on Boston's postseason roster, Wright was removed and replaced by Heath Hembree for the ALDS and beyond due to his previous knee injury. The Red Sox went on to win the World Series over the Los Angeles Dodgers.

==== 2019 ====
On January 11, 2019, Wright and the Red Sox reached agreement on a one-year contract worth $1.375 million. On March 6, 2019, Wright received an 80-game suspension without pay after testing positive for Growth Hormone Releasing Peptide 2 (GHRP-2), a performance-enhancing substance, in violation of MLB’s Joint Drug Prevention and Treatment Program.

Wright made his first appearance of the season with Triple-A Pawtucket on a rehabilitation assignment in early June, and was added to Boston's active roster on June 25. Wright was placed on the injured list on July 14 with a right great toe contusion. On September 1, the Red Sox moved him to the 60-day injured list. For the season with Boston, Wright was 0–1 with an 8.53 ERA and five strikeouts in 6 1/3 innings. Wright was released by the Red Sox on October 18, and he announced shortly thereafter that he would undergo Tommy John surgery.

=== Pittsburgh Pirates ===
On March 21, 2021, Wright signed a minor league contract with the Pittsburgh Pirates that included an invitation to spring training. In 18 appearances for the Triple-A Indianapolis Indians, Wright had a 6.68 ERA with 70 strikeouts. On August 19, Wright was released by the Pirates organization.

== Personal life ==
Wright and his wife Shannon have two children, a daughter and son. In December 2017, Wright was arrested for domestic assault, although the court case was "retired" and would be dismissed in December 2018 if no further incidents occur.

== See also ==
- List of Major League Baseball players suspended for performance-enhancing drugs

Awards
Preceded by Daniel Nava	Lou Gorman Award; 2013	Succeeded by Dan Butler
