= Rusney Castillo =

Cuban baseball player (born 1987)

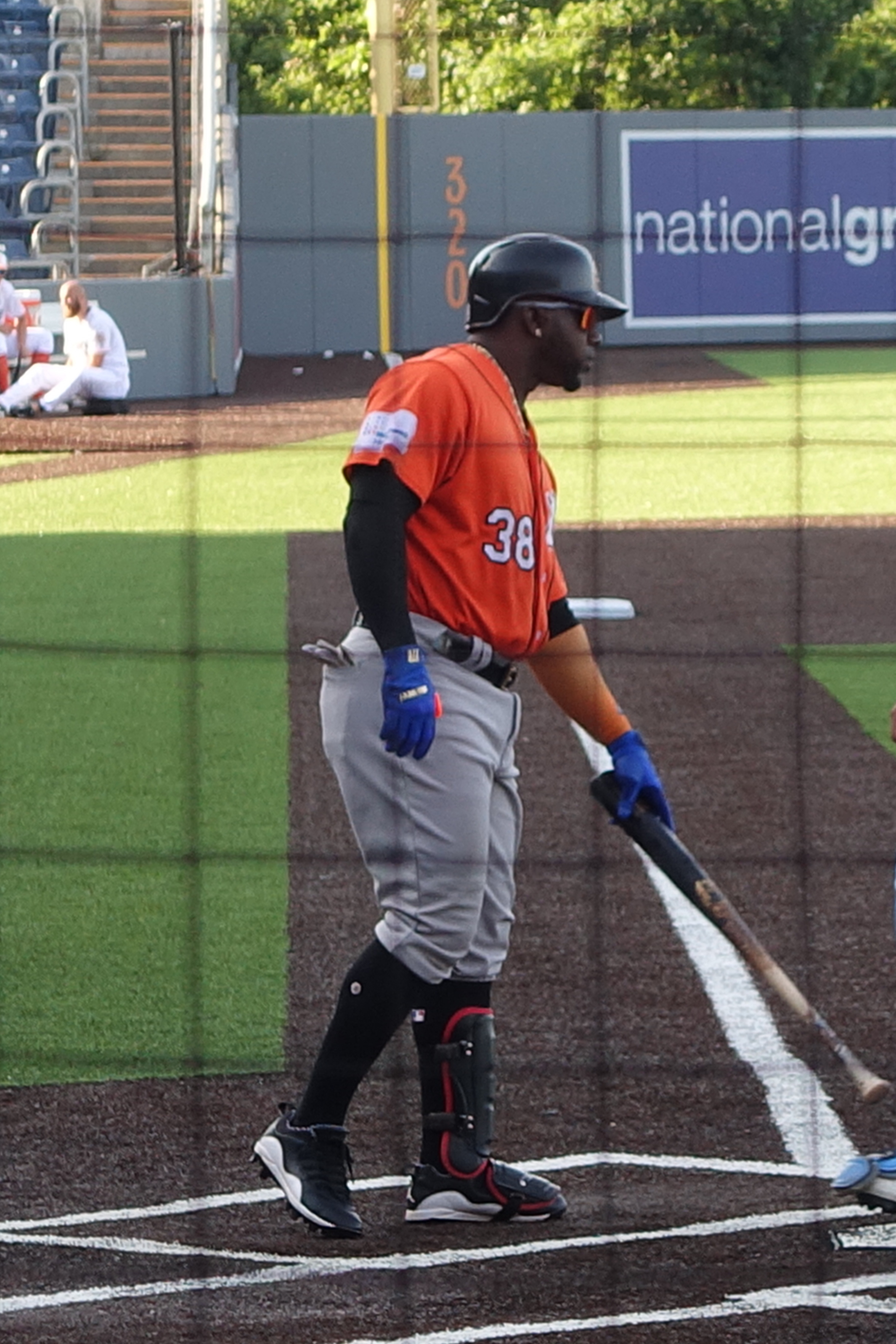
- Castillo with the Long Island Ducks in 2022.

Free agent
- Outfielder
- Born: July 9, 1987 (age 39); Ciego de Ávila, Cuba
- Bats: Right Throws: Right

Professional debut
- MLB: September 17, 2014, for the Boston Red Sox
- NPB: April 23, 2021, for the Tohoku Rakuten Golden Eagles

MLB statistics (through 2016 season)
- Batting average: .262
- Home runs: 7
- Runs batted in: 35

NPB statistics (through 2021 season)
- Batting average: .225
- Home runs: 1
- Runs batted in: 3
- Stats at Baseball Reference

Teams
- Boston Red Sox (2014–2016); Tohoku Rakuten Golden Eagles (2021)
Medals
Men's baseball
Representing Cuba
Baseball World Cup
Silver medal – second place	2011 Panama	Team
Pan American Games
Bronze medal – third place	2011 Guadalajara	Team

Rusney Castillo Peraza (born July 9, 1987) is a Cuban professional baseball outfielder who is a free agent. He has previously played in Major League Baseball (MLB) for the Boston Red Sox and in Nippon Professional Baseball (NPB) for the Tohoku Rakuten Golden Eagles. Listed at 5 feet 9 inches (1.75 m) and 195 pounds (88 kg), he bats and throws right handed.

Castillo was born in Ciego de Ávila, a city located in the central part of Cuba and the capital of Ciego de Ávila Province. At age 22, he showed enough skills to land a spot on Los Tigres, the nickname for Ciego de Ávila's club in the Cuban National Series. Additionally, he played with the Cuba national baseball team in several international tournaments, including the 2011 Baseball World Cup and the 2011 Pan American Games, before defecting from Cuba in December 2013 to pursue an MLB career. In August 2014, Castillo signed a $72.5 million contract with the Boston Red Sox, which ran through the 2020 season.

== Cuban baseball career ==
Castillo joined the Ciego de Ávila team in the 2008–2009 season, playing for them through 2012–2013. Used sparingly during his first two seasons, he played only 28 games in his rookie year and 44 as a sophomore, while hitting averages of .349 (15-for-43) and .303 (30-for-99), respectively. He spent most of his time playing second base, third base, and the corner outfield positions, until becoming a solid center fielder in the years to come.

His breakout season came in 2010–2011, when he got a major boost in playing time and posted a .320 average with 22 home runs and 95 runs batted in in 107 games, including 75 runs scored, 27 doubles, five triples, and a league-lead 32 stolen bases.

Castillo enjoyed another fine season in 2011–2012, as he batted .342 and slugged .574 in 113 games, stealing 27 bases and collecting a very solid .408 on-base percentage, while driving in 84 runs and scoring 101 times. In addition, he topped the league with 37 doubles, ranked 13th in batting average and tied for third in stolen bases.

Castillo played his last season in 2012–2013. But this time his batting average declined to .274, as well as his games played (68), going 64-for-234 with six homers, 29 RBI and 15 stolen bases.

=== International competition ===
In between, Castillo gained prominence as a member of the Cuba national baseball team. With Yoenis Céspedes and Leonys Martín gone from Cuba, he became the regular center fielder for his team in the 2011 Baseball World Cup held in Panama. Castillo was named to the tournament's All-Star team after leading the World Cup in batting average (.512) and slugging (.854) while ranking fourth in on-base percentage (.524). Overall, he went 21-for-41 with four doubles, two triples and two homers in 10 games.

Castillo also played in the 2011 Pan American Games hosted by Mexico, where he hit .273 (6-for-22) and slugged .318 with a .333 OBP. In the same year, he played in the World Port Tournament in the Netherlands. Then, in 2012 he appeared in exhibition baseball series held at Nicaragua, Taiwan, Japan and Cuba, where he faced the U.S. College National Team, in preparation for the upcoming 2013 World Baseball Classic. Castillo was originally slated to be part of the team, but he did not make the final cut. According to an official statement released, he was suspended for trying to defect.

As the Havana Times reports, a pattern has developed especially over the last decade whereby Cuban baseball stars and top prospects attempt to leave the island illegally and are caught and suspended from playing in the Cuban league. With no choice left to them to continue in their profession, they then succeed at a future attempt escaping to a neighboring country.

Finally, Castillo attempted to leave Cuba once more, and was successful. In early June 2014, he was granted official free agent status by Major League Baseball after establishing permanent residency in the Dominican Republic and being unblocked by the Office of Foreign Assets Control.

== Professional career ==
=== Boston Red Sox ===
On August 23, 2014, the Boston Red Sox signed Castillo to a seven-year, $72.5 million contract. Castillo was given the jersey number, 38, which he wore in Cuba.

Castillo made his major league debut on September 17, 2014, as the Red Sox starting center fielder; he collected his first MLB hit in the fourth inning, a single off of Francisco Liriano. Castillo appeared in a total of 10 games with the 2014 Red Sox, batting 12-for-36 (.333) with two home runs and six RBIs.

Castillo started the 2015 season with the Triple-A Pawtucket Red Sox, where he appeared in 40 games, batting .282 with three home runs and 17 RBIs. He was called up to Boston in the second half of May; he appeared in 80 MLB games for the Red Sox, batting .253 with five home runs and 29 RBIs.

Castillo spent most of the 2016 season with Triple-A Pawtucket; he made only nine appearances with Boston, one in April and eight in June, batting 2-for-8 (.250) without a home run or RBI.

Overall, in parts of three seasons with Boston (2014–2016), Castillo appeared in 99 MLB games, batting .262 with 7 home runs and 35 RBIs. Defensively, he had a .975 fielding percentage in 89 games played in the outfield.

==== Minor leagues ====
On June 18, 2016, Castillo was put on waivers by the Red Sox; he cleared waivers on June 20 and was outrighted to Pawtucket, where he spent the rest of the season. He appeared in a total of 103 Triple-A games during 2016, batting .263 with two home runs and 34 RBIs.

During the 2017 season, Castillo played in 87 games for Triple-A Pawtucket, batting .314 with 15 home runs and 43 RBIs. He did not play any MLB games with Boston nor was he added to the 40-man roster. Castillo remained with Triple-A Pawtucket for the 2018 season, appearing in 117 games while batting .319 with five home runs and 59 RBIs. For the 2018 season, he was named to the International League All-Star Team, and his .319 average led the International League.

After being a non-roster invitee to Boston's 2019 spring training, Castillo started the 2019 season as the oldest player on Pawtucket's roster. With the 2019 PawSox, Castillo appeared in 120 games, batting .278 with 17 home runs and 64 RBIs. After the 2019 season, Castillo did not exercise an opt-out clause in his contract, thus remaining in Boston's minor league system for 2020, the final season of his seven-year contract with the Red Sox. He was again a non-roster invitee to Boston's spring training, but did not play outside of spring training, due to the 2020 minor league season being cancelled because of the COVID-19 pandemic. On October 28, 2020, Castillo's contract with the Red Sox expired, making him a free agent.

Overall, in five seasons with Pawtucket (2015–2019), Castillo appeared in 467 minor league games, batting .293 with 42 home runs and 217 RBIs. Defensively, he had a .990 fielding percentage in 423 games played in the outfield. The Red Sox kept Castillo in Triple-A in part because adding him back to the active roster would add his salary back to luxury tax calculations, which would cost the team $3 million per year.

=== Tohoku Rakuten Golden Eagles ===
On January 9, 2021, Castillo signed a $600,000 contract with the Tohoku Rakuten Golden Eagles of Nippon Professional Baseball (NPB). On April 23, 2021, he made his NPB debut. Castillo played in 33 games, hitting .225 with one home run and three RBIs. He became a free agent following the season.

=== Long Island Ducks ===
On January 20, 2022, Castillo signed a minor-league contract with the Washington Nationals. Castillo was released by the Nationals on March 29.

On April 22, 2022, Castillo signed with the Long Island Ducks of the Atlantic League of Professional Baseball. Castillo posted a .278/.329/.366 slash line with three home runs and 24 RBI in 57 games before he was released on July 7.

=== Staten Island FerryHawks ===
On July 11, 2022, Castillo signed with the Staten Island FerryHawks of the Atlantic League. Castillo played in 43 games for Staten Island, slashing .325/.385/.383 with 3 home runs, 23 RBI, and 4 stolen bases. He became a free agent after the season.

=== Mariachis de Guadalajara ===
On March 28, 2023, Castillo signed with the Mariachis de Guadalajara of the Mexican League. In 13 games, he slashed .279/.311/.349 with 12 hits and five RBI. Castillo was released on June 2.

=== Conspiradores de Querétaro ===
On January 16, 2024, Castillo signed with the Conspiradores de Querétaro of the Mexican League. In 18 games for Querétaro, he hit .351/.360/.608 with three home runs, 19 RBI, and one stolen base.

Castillo re-signed with Querétaro on March 13, 2025. In 63 games for the team, he batted .328/.402/.433 with five home runs, 30 RBI, and two stolen bases. On March 4, 2026, Castillo was released by the Conspiradores.

== Personal life ==
Castillo is married and has one daughter. In early 2018, he was able to return to Cuba for the first time since his defection. While playing in Pawtucket, Castillo continued to live in Boston, driving about one hour for home games. In April 2019, he put up for sale a 10,572 square foot (982.2 m^{2}) home he owned in Pinecrest, Florida, with an asking price of $3,953,000.

== See also ==
- List of baseball players who defected from Cuba
