= Alex Hassan =

American baseball player (born 1988)

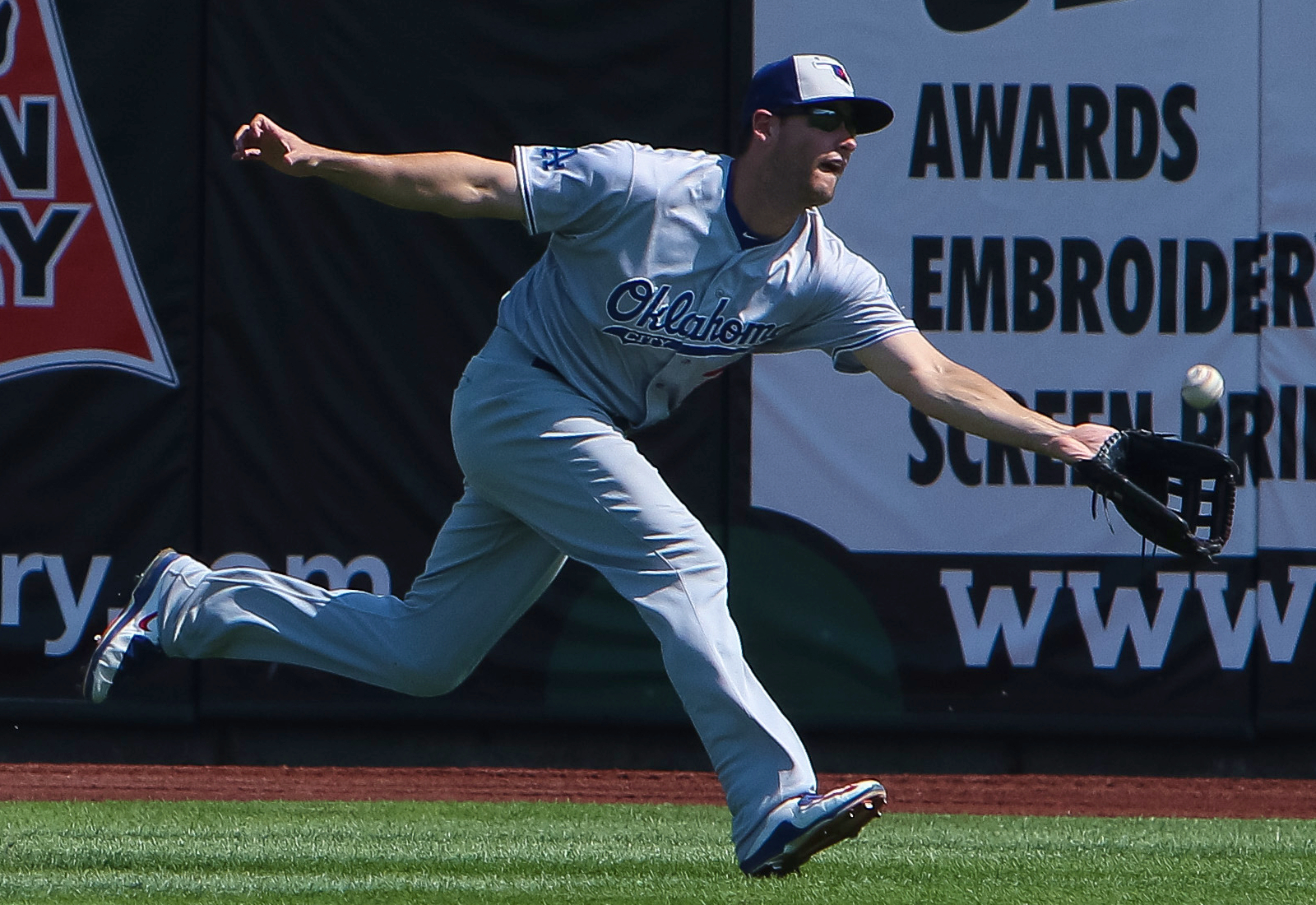
- Hassan with the Oklahoma City Dodgers in 2016
- Left fielder
- Born: April 1, 1988 (age 38); Quincy, Massachusetts, U.S.
- Batted: Right Threw: Right

MLB debut
- June 1, 2014, for the Boston Red Sox

Last appearance
- August 20, 2014, for the Boston Red Sox

MLB statistics
- Batting average: .125
- Home runs: 0
- Runs batted in: 0
- Stats at Baseball Reference

Teams
- Boston Red Sox (2014)

Alexander Edward Hassan (born April 1, 1988) is an American former professional baseball outfielder. He played in Major League Baseball (MLB) for the Boston Red Sox in 2014.

== Amateur career ==
A native of Quincy, Massachusetts, Hassan attended Boston College High School and Duke University. A two-way player in college, he posted a .342 average with three home runs and 39 runs batted in as a junior at Duke in 2009. He also led the team with 56 runs scored, while going 2-2 with a 4.10 earned run average and a team-leading eight saves in 16 games pitched. In 2008 and 2009, he played collegiate summer baseball with the Orleans Firebirds of the Cape Cod Baseball League and was named a league all-star in 2009. He was selected by the Boston Red Sox in the 20th round of the 2009 draft.

== Professional career ==
=== Boston Red Sox ===
Hassan was originally drafted as a pitcher, but impressed enough in the Cape Cod League in 2009 that the Boston organization decided to switch him to outfield. Being able to play in all three outfield positions, he is best suited at left field.

In his first season, he batted a combined .328 average in 34 games with Short Season-A Lowell and Class A Greenville, gaining a promotion to Advanced-A Salem in 2010.

In 2010, he batted .287 in 107 games for Salem and led the team in walks (57) and on-base percentage (.397), before joining Triple-A Pawtucket late in the season for only three games.

He opened 2011 with Double A Portland, and batted .291 with 13 home runs and 64 RBI in 126 games. He finished 3rd in the Eastern League in on-base percentage (.406), 4th in walks (76), 8th in On-base plus slugging (.902) and 12th in batting, while earning an EL All-Star berth during the midseason. In addition, he led all outfielders with a .995 fielding percentage, after committing only one error in 210 total chances, while his on-base percentage also was the best in the Red Sox minor league system.

Hassan was rated by Baseball America as having the best strike zone judgment in the Red Sox organization entering the 2012 season. He returned to Pawtucket in 2012. Even though he played only 94 games because of assorted injuries, he hit a career-low .256 average, but ranked 2nd in the team in OBP (.377), 3rd in RBI (46), and 8th in runs (39), hits (80) and doubles (12).

Hassan got a late start to the 2013 season with Pawtucket after recovering from injuries, being limited to 63 games, but grabbed a firm hold of his spot on the 40-man roster. He finished with a .338 average, which was the best in the organization, driving in 35 runs and scoring 30 times, while collecting a .457 OBP (also a best) and a .471 of slugging.

Hassan was called up to Boston from Pawtucket on May 30, 2014, and made his MLB debut on June 1. In his major league debut, he went one for three with a hit in three at-bats with a run scored. He was optioned back to Pawtucket on June 8.

=== Texas Rangers ===
On November 17, 2014, Hassan was claimed off waivers by the Oakland Athletics. He was designated for assignment by Oakland, and on November 20, he was claimed by the Baltimore Orioles. The Orioles designated Hassan for assignment on February 25, 2015, and he was reclaimed by Oakland on February 27. He was designated for assignment by the Athletics on April 8. Hassan was claimed by the Texas Rangers the next day.

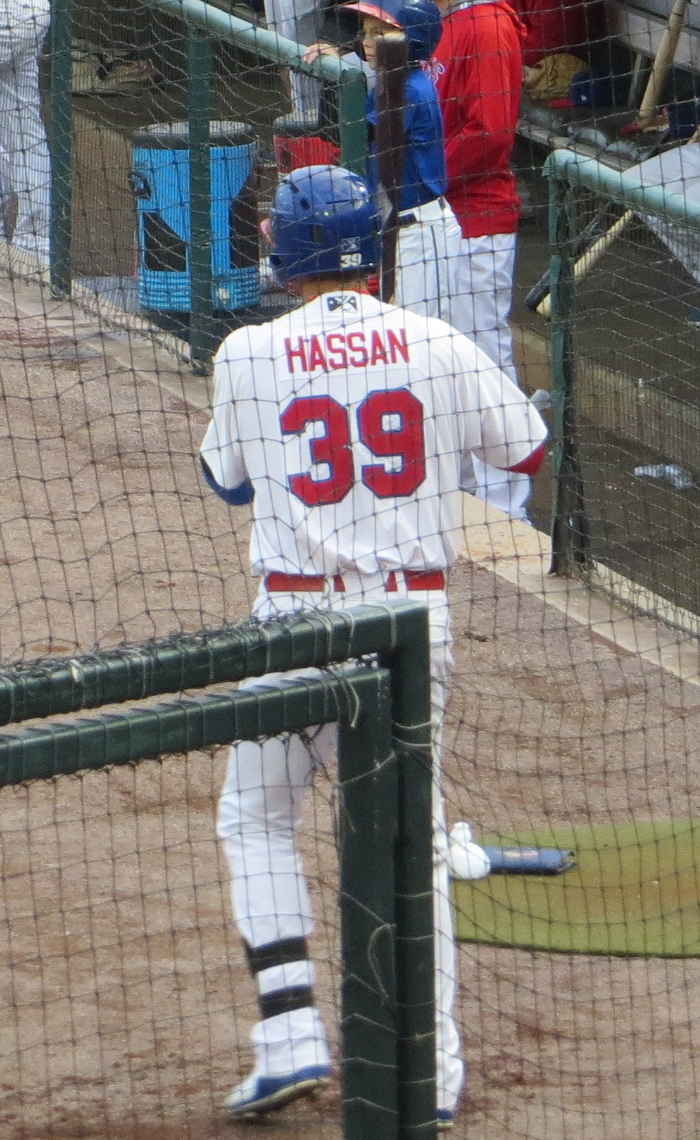
Hassan during his tenure with the Buffalo Bisons, Triple-A affiliates of the Blue Jays, in 2015

=== Oakland Athletics ===
After being placed on waivers by the Rangers, Hassan was claimed by the Oakland Athletics and optioned to the Triple–A Nashville Sounds on May 2, 2015. He was designated for assignment on May 8 and released four days later.

=== Toronto Blue Jays ===
On May 20, 2015, Hassan signed a minor league contract with the Toronto Blue Jays. In 74 games for the Triple-A Buffalo Bisons, he slashed .314/.357/.419 with two home runs and 34 RBI. Hassan elected free agency following the season on November 6.

=== Los Angeles Dodgers ===
On December 17, 2015, Hassan signed a minor league contract with the Los Angeles Dodgers organization that included an invitation to spring training. He was assigned to the Triple–A Oklahoma City Dodgers to begin the 2016 season. In 88 games for Oklahoma City, Hassan hit .232/.340/.272 with one home run and 20 RBI. He elected free agency following the season on November 7, 2016.

Hassan announced his retirement from professional baseball on January 19, 2017, via Twitter.

== Post-playing career ==
In 2018, Hassan became the Assistant Director of Minor League Operations for the Minnesota Twins. On January 14, 2025, the Twins promoted Hassan to assistant general manager.
