= Jonathan Aro =

Dominican baseball player (born 1990)

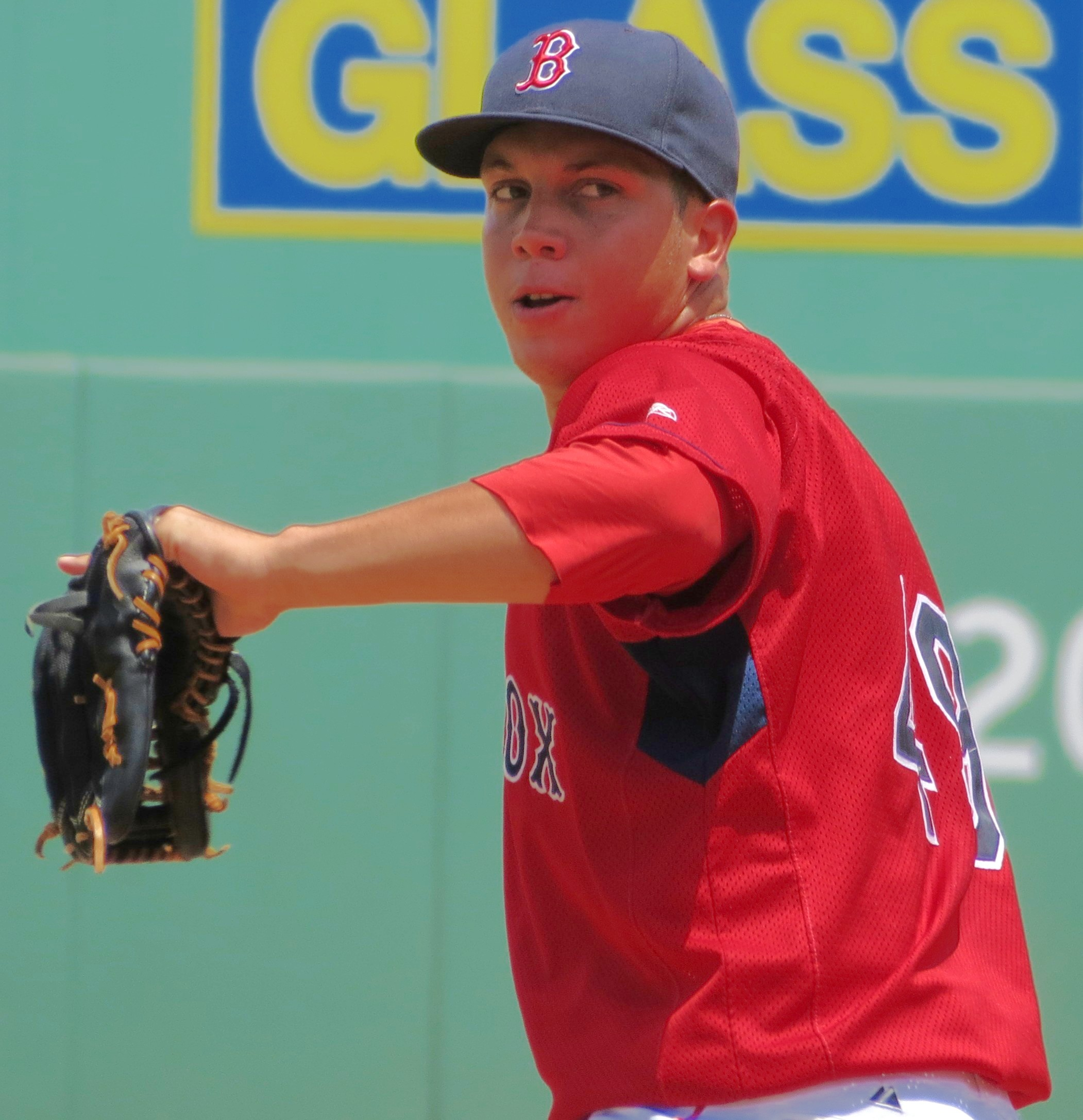
- Aro with the Boston Red Sox in 2012

Toros de Tijuana – No. 49
- Relief pitcher
- Born: October 10, 1990 (age 35); La Vega, Dominican Republic
- Bats: Right Throws: Right

MLB debut
- June 25, 2015, for the Boston Red Sox

MLB statistics (through 2016 season)
- Win–loss record: 0–1
- Earned run average: 6.55
- Strikeouts: 8
- Stats at Baseball Reference

Teams
- Boston Red Sox (2015); Seattle Mariners (2016)

Jonathan Arturo Aro (born October 10, 1990) is a Dominican professional baseball pitcher for the Toros de Tijuana of the Mexican League. He has previously played in Major League Baseball (MLB) for the Boston Red Sox and Seattle Mariners. He made his MLB debut in 2015.

== Career ==
=== Boston Red Sox ===
The Boston Red Sox signed Aro as an international free agent on June 6, 2011. He grew up in the Dominican Republic idolizing Red Sox legend and Hall of Famer Pedro Martínez. His pitching repertoire includes a 91–93 mph fastball which occasionally reaches 95 mph, as well as an 83–85 mph changeup and a slurve at 78–81 mph with a short, 11-to-5 break, throwing most of them for strikes.

Aro made a fast ascent in the Boston Minor League system in a span of four years. After spending a full season each with the Dominican Summer League Red Sox, Gulf Coast League Red Sox, and Lowell Spinners from 2011 through 2013, he spent 2014 with the Salem Red Sox and the Greenville Drive. Besides, he was named a SoxProspects.com All-Star in both 2013 and 2014, and was also honored as South Atlantic League All-Star in the 2014 season, after finishing with a record of 1–3 and a 2.16 ERA and 10 saves in 25 games, including 74 strikeouts and 22 walks in 67 1/3 innings pitched. In his two stints, Aro went 3–8 with a 2.16 ERA and eight saves in 87 1/3 innings of work, setting the second lowest ERA in the Red Sox minors system in a minimum of 80 innings pitched, being surpassed only by Brian Johnson (2.13).

Aro joined the Portland Sea Dogs bullpen in 2015, where he posted a 3–2 record with a 2.28 ERA in eight appearances, striking out 19 and walking eight in 22 1/3 innings. He then appeared in his fourth level in less than ten months, after being promoted to the Pawtucket Red Sox in May 2015. On June 25, Aro earned a promotion to the Boston Red Sox. He was optioned July 2 after three appearances, then was recalled in September, making six total appearances with Boston for the season while recording an 0–1 record with 6.97 ERA. Aro was also the recipient of the Red Sox' Lou Gorman Award.

=== Seattle Mariners ===
On December 7, 2015, the Red Sox traded Aro and Wade Miley to the Seattle Mariners for Roenis Elías and Carson Smith. On January 26, 2017, Aro was designated for assignment by the Mariners. After clearing waivers, Aro was outrighted to the Triple-A Tacoma Rainiers on February 1. On April 24, Aro was suspended 50 games by MLB for a drug of abuse. In 25 appearances for Tacoma, he posted a 6–1 record and 3.16 ERA with 48 strikeouts across 42 2/3 innings pitched. Aro elected free agency following the season on November 6.

=== San Diego Padres ===
On November 27, 2017, Aro signed a minor league contract with the San Diego Padres. In 38 relief outings for the Triple–A El Paso Chihuahuas, he recorded a 3.68 ERA with 36 strikeouts across 44 innings pitched. Aro elected free agency following the season on November 2, 2018.

=== Atlanta Braves ===
On January 18, 2019, Aro signed a minor league contract with the Atlanta Braves. He made 31 appearances split between the Double–A Mississippi Braves and Triple–A Gwinnett Stripers, accumulating a 6–3 record and 3.53 ERA with 40 strikeouts across 63 2/3 innings pitched. Aro elected free agency following the season on November 4.

=== Guerreros de Oaxaca ===
On January 29, 2020, Aro signed with the Guerreros de Oaxaca of the Mexican League. Aro did not play in a game in 2020 due to the cancellation of the Mexican League season because of the COVID-19 pandemic. He was released by the Guerreros on November 18. On March 5, 2021, Aro re-signed with Oaxaca. Aro registered a 11.72 ERA with 5 strikeouts in 7 games for Oaxaca before being released on June 15.

=== Mariachis de Guadalajara ===
On June 19, 2021, Aro signed with the Mariachis de Guadalajara of the Mexican League. In 19 appearances for Guadalajara, Aro registered a 2.95 ERA with 17 strikeouts in 18 1/3 innings of work.

=== Los Angeles Angels ===
On March 16, 2022, Aro signed a minor league contract with the Los Angeles Angels organization. Aro made 40 appearances (7 starts) for the Triple-A Salt Lake Bees, working to a 4–7 record and 6.03 ERA with 51 strikeouts and 3 saves in 62 2/3 innings pitched. He elected free agency following the season on November 10.

=== Mariachis de Guadalajara (second stint) ===
On February 21, 2023, Aro signed with the Mariachis de Guadalajara of the Mexican League. In 46 appearances for Guadalajara, he posted a 4–2 record and 2.51 ERA with 44 strikeouts and 15 saves across 46 2/3 innings of relief.

=== Charros de Jalisco ===
On February 14, 2024, Aro signed with the Charros de Jalisco of the Mexican League. He made 17 appearances for Jalisco, struggling to an 0–3 record and 8.10 ERA with 13 strikeouts and 6 saves over 16 2/3 innings pitched.

Aro made 11 appearances for Jalisco in 2025, but struggled to a 9.22 ERA with nine strikeouts across 13 2/3 innings pitched.

=== Guerreros de Oaxaca (second stint) ===
On June 1, 2025, Aro was traded to the Guerreros de Oaxaca of the Mexican League. In 11 appearances for Oaxaca, he struggled to a 0–1 record and 13.50 ERA with six strikeouts over eight innings of work. Aro elected free agency on July 2.

=== El Águila de Veracruz ===
On July 3, 2025, Aro signed with El Águila de Veracruz of the Mexican League. In 17 relief appearances, he went recorded a 1.06 ERA and 15 strikeouts in 17 innings pitched.

Aro operated primarily as a closer with Veracruz in 2026, posting a 3–1 record with a 2.57 ERA, 48 strikeouts, and 16 saves across 42 innings pitched.

=== Toros de Tijuana ===
On August 4, 2026, Aro was traded to the Toros de Tijuana of the Mexican League.

Awards
| Preceded by Dan Butler | Lou Gorman Award; 2015 | Succeeded by Robby Scott |
