= List of Boston Red Sox award winners =

This is a list of award winners and single-season leaderboards for the Boston Red Sox professional baseball team.

== Abbreviations ==
- p: pitcher
- rp: relief pitcher
- sp: starting pitcher
- c: catcher
- 1b: first baseman
- 2b: second baseman
- 3b: third baseman
- ss: shortstop
- lf: left fielder
- cf: center fielder
- rf: right fielder
- if: infielder
- of: outfielder
- dh: designated hitter
- MLB: Major League Baseball
- AL: American League

== Awards ==
=== MVP Award ===
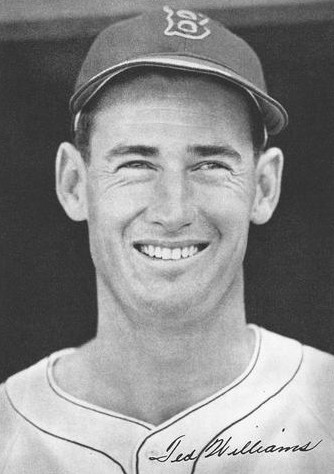
Ted Williams leads the Red Sox in MVP Awards, winning in 1946 and 1949.

- 1912: Tris Speaker.
- 1938: Jimmie Foxx.
- 1946: Ted Williams.
- 1949: Ted Williams.
- 1958: Jackie Jensen.
- 1967: Carl Yastrzemski.
- 1975: Fred Lynn.
- 1978: Jim Rice.
- 1986: Roger Clemens.
- 1995: Mo Vaughn.
- 2008: Dustin Pedroia.
- 2018: Mookie Betts.

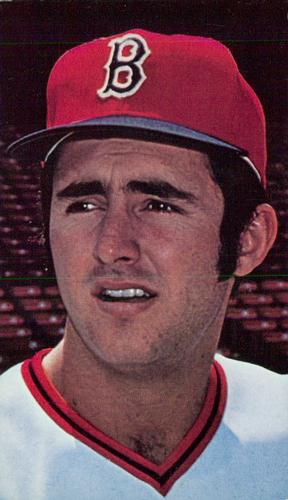
Fred Lynn became the first player in MLB history to win Rookie of the Year and Most Valuable Player in the Same Year.

=== Cy Young Award ===
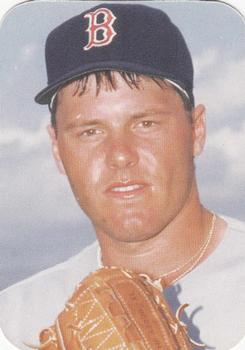
Roger Clemens has the most Cy Young Awards among Red Sox Players; Clemens won the Cy Young Award in 1986, 1987, and 1991.

- 1967: Jim Lonborg.
- 1986: Roger Clemens (Unanimous Choice).
- 1987: Roger Clemens.
- 1991: Roger Clemens.
- 1999: Pedro Martínez (Unanimous Choice).
- 2000: Pedro Martínez (Unanimous Choice).
- 2016: Rick Porcello.

=== Rookie of the Year Award ===
- 1950: Walt Dropo.
- 1961: Don Schwall.
- 1972: Carlton Fisk (Unanimous Choice).
- 1975: Fred Lynn.
- 1997: Nomar Garciaparra (Unanimous Choice).
- 2007: Dustin Pedroia.

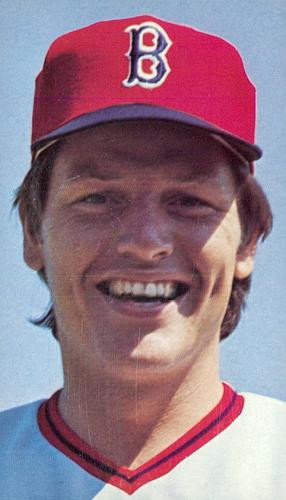
Carlton Fisk became the first ever unanimous choice for the American League Rookie of the Year in 1972.

=== Manager of the Year Award ===
- 1986: John McNamara.
- 1999: Jimy Williams.

=== Silver Slugger Award ===
Twenty four different Red Sox players have received Silver Slugger Awards since its inception in 1981. Wade Boggs (3B) and David Ortiz (DH) have the most wins at their respective positions, the only American League players to currently to hold this distinction. Additionally, the 9 wins for Manny Ramirez are the most of any American League outfielder. In 2018 J.D. Martinez was awarded the Silver Slugger for the DH and OF positions, making him the only player to win the award twice in a single season.

Key
†	Elected to the Baseball Hall of Fame

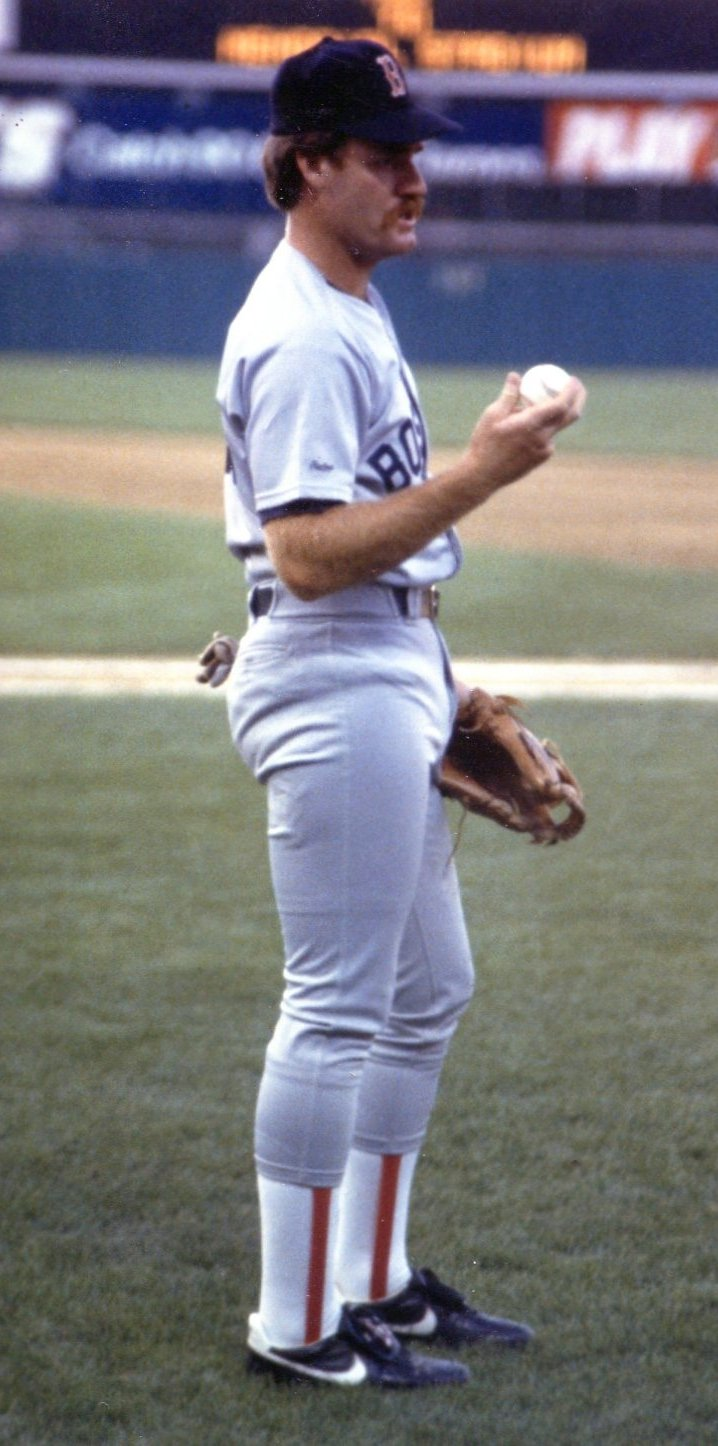
Wade Boggs won eight Silver Slugger Awards with the Red Sox, the most among Red Sox players.

Player	Position	Times Won	Years	Reference
Tony Armas	OF	1	1984	
Jason Bay	OF	1	2009	
Don Baylor	DH	1	1986	
Adrián Beltré^{†}	3B	1	2010	
Mookie Betts	OF	3	2016, 2018-2019	
Xander Bogaerts	SS	5	2015–2016, 2019, 2021–2022	
Wade Boggs^{†}	3B	8	1983, 1986–1989, 1991, 1993─1994	
Ellis Burks	OF	1	1990	
Rafael Devers	3B	2	2021, 2023	
Jacoby Ellsbury	OF	1	2011	
Dwight Evans	OF	2	1981, 1987	
Nomar Garciaparra	SS	1	1997	
Adrián González	1B	1	2011	
Mike Greenwell	OF	1	1988	
Carney Lansford	3B	1	1981	
J. D. Martinez	OF, DH	2	2018 (2)	
Bill Mueller	3B	1	2003	
David Ortiz^{†}	DH	7	2004–2007, 2011, 2013, 2016	
Dustin Pedroia	2B	1	2008	
Manny Ramirez	OF, DH	7	2000–2006	
Jim Rice^{†}	OF	2	1983–1984	
John Valentin	SS	1	1995	
Jason Varitek	C	1	2005	
Mo Vaughn	1B	1	1995	

=== Gold Glove Award ===
24 different Red Sox players have won Gold Glove Awards since the award was begun in 1957. Dwight Evans with eight Gold Gloves is the all-time Red Sox leader, while Carl Yastrzemski is second with seven. Only three outfielders have won more Gold Gloves than Evans: Willie Mays (12), Roberto Clemente (12) and Al Kaline (10).

Key
†	Elected to the Baseball Hall of Fame

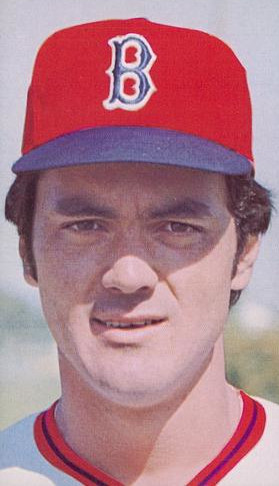
Dwight Evans won 8 Gold Gloves as a Red Sox player, the most in team history.

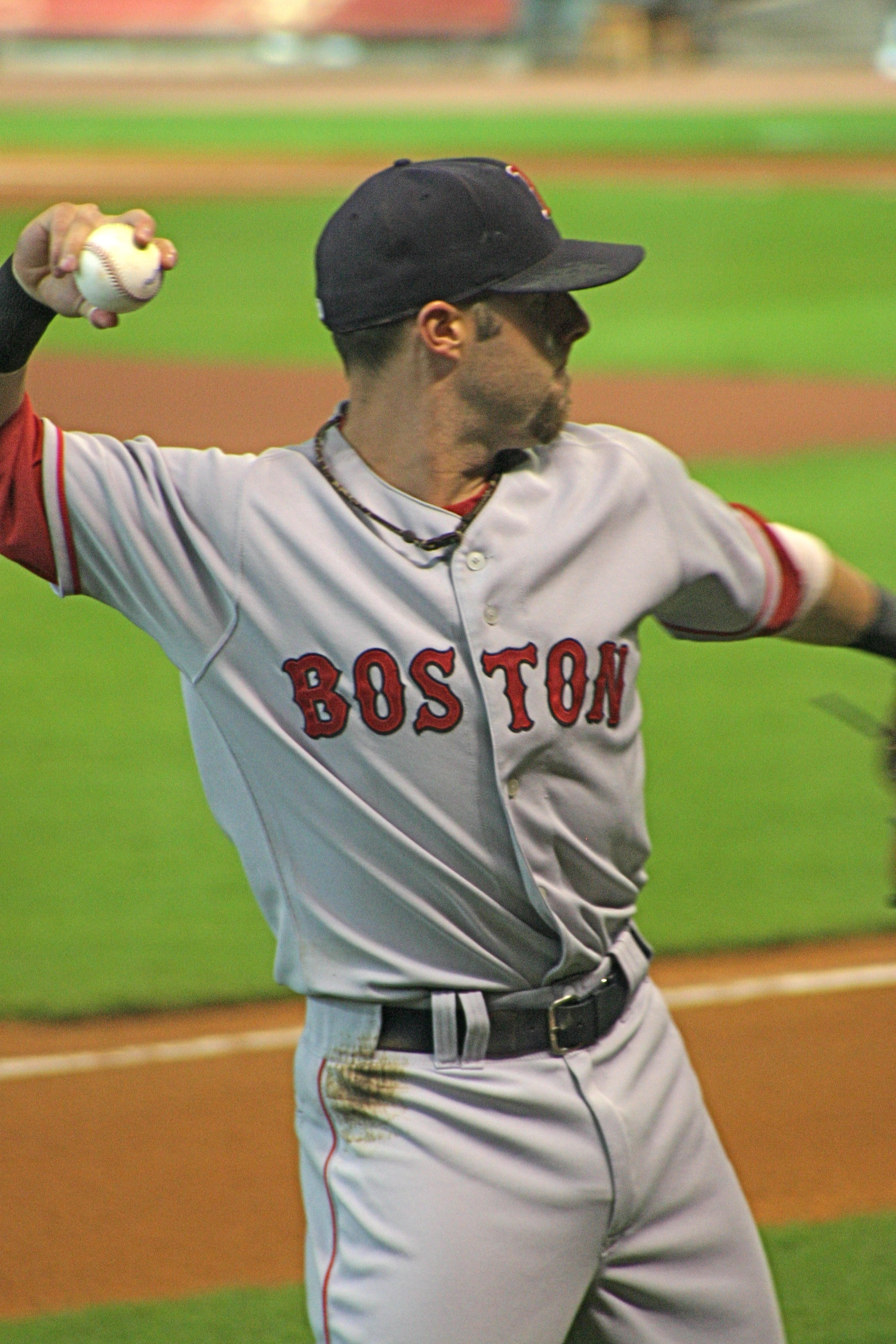
Dustin Pedroia won four Gold Glove Awards with the Red Sox.

Player	Position	Times Won	Years	References
Wilyer Abreu	OF	3	2024–2026	
Mookie Betts	OF	4	2016–2019	
Mike Boddicker	P	1	1990	
Jackie Bradley Jr.	OF	1	2018	
Ellis Burks	OF	1	1990	
Rick Burleson	SS	1	1979	
Caleb Durbin	3B	1	2026	
Jacoby Ellsbury	OF	1	2011	
Dwight Evans	OF	8	1976, 1978–1979, 1981–1985	
Carlton Fisk^{†}	C	1	1972	
Adrián González	1B	1	2011	
Doug Griffin	2B	1	1972	
Jackie Jensen	OF	1	1959	
Ian Kinsler^{‡}	2B	1	2018	
Fred Lynn	OF	4	1975, 1978–1980	
Frank Malzone	3B	3	1957–1959	
Dustin Pedroia	2B	4	2008, 2011, 2013–2014	
Tony Pena	C	1	1991	
Jim Piersall	OF	1	1958	
Ceddanne Rafaela	OF	2	2025–2026	
George Scott	1B	3	1967–1968, 1971	
Reggie Smith	OF	1	1968	
Jason Varitek	C	1	2005	
Shane Victorino	OF	1	2013	
Carl Yastrzemski^{†}	OF	7	1963, 1965, 1967–1969, 1971, 1977	
Kevin Youkilis	1B	1	2007	

‡ Ian Kinsler played the first half of the 2018 season with the Los Angeles Angels.

=== All-MLB Team ===
Since 2019, the All-MLB Team Award is given out to the best players from each position voted by fans and a panel of experts.

- 2019: Xander Bogaerts (SS), Mookie Betts (OF)
- 2021: Rafael Devers (3B)
- 2024: Jarren Duran (OF)
- 2025: Garrett Crochet (SP), Aroldis Chapman (RP)
- 2026: Willson Contreras (1B), Sonny Gray (SP)

=== Wilson Defensive Player of the Year Award ===
The Wilson Defensive Player of the Year Award was established in 2012. It was awarded to one player on each MLB team in 2012 and 2013; since 2014, one MLB player at each position has been honored. An overall Defensive Player of the Year has been selected each year; one player per league in 2012 and 2013, and a single MLB player starting in 2014.

- 2012: Dustin Pedroia.
- 2013: Dustin Pedroia.
- 2016: Dustin Pedroia (2B), Mookie Betts (OF).
- 2018: Mookie Betts (OF).

Overall winner

- 2013: Dustin Pedroia (AL).
- 2016: Mookie Betts (MLB).

=== Hank Aaron Award ===
The Hank Aaron Award, introduced in 1999, is given annually to MLB players selected as the top hitter in each league, as voted on by baseball fans and members of the media.

- 2004: Manny Ramirez
- 2005: David Ortiz
- 2008: Kevin Youkilis
- 2016: David Ortiz
- 2018: J. D. Martinez

=== Reliever of the Year Award ===
Formerly the Delivery Man Award (2005–2013), awarded to one MLB reliever; the Reliever of the Year Award has been issued since 2014, to a reliever in each league.

- 2007: Jonathan Papelbon (MLB).
- 2017: Craig Kimbrel (AL).
- 2025: Aroldis Chapman (AL).

=== Relief Man of the Year Award ===
Awarded from 1976 to 2012

- 1977: Bill Campbell.
- 1998: Tom Gordon.

=== Comeback Player of the Year Award ===
Awarded in each league, since 2005

- 2011: Jacoby Ellsbury.
- 2016: Rick Porcello.
- 2018: David Price.

=== Edgar Martínez Award ===
The Edgar Martínez Award has been presented annually to the most outstanding designated hitter in the American League since 1973.

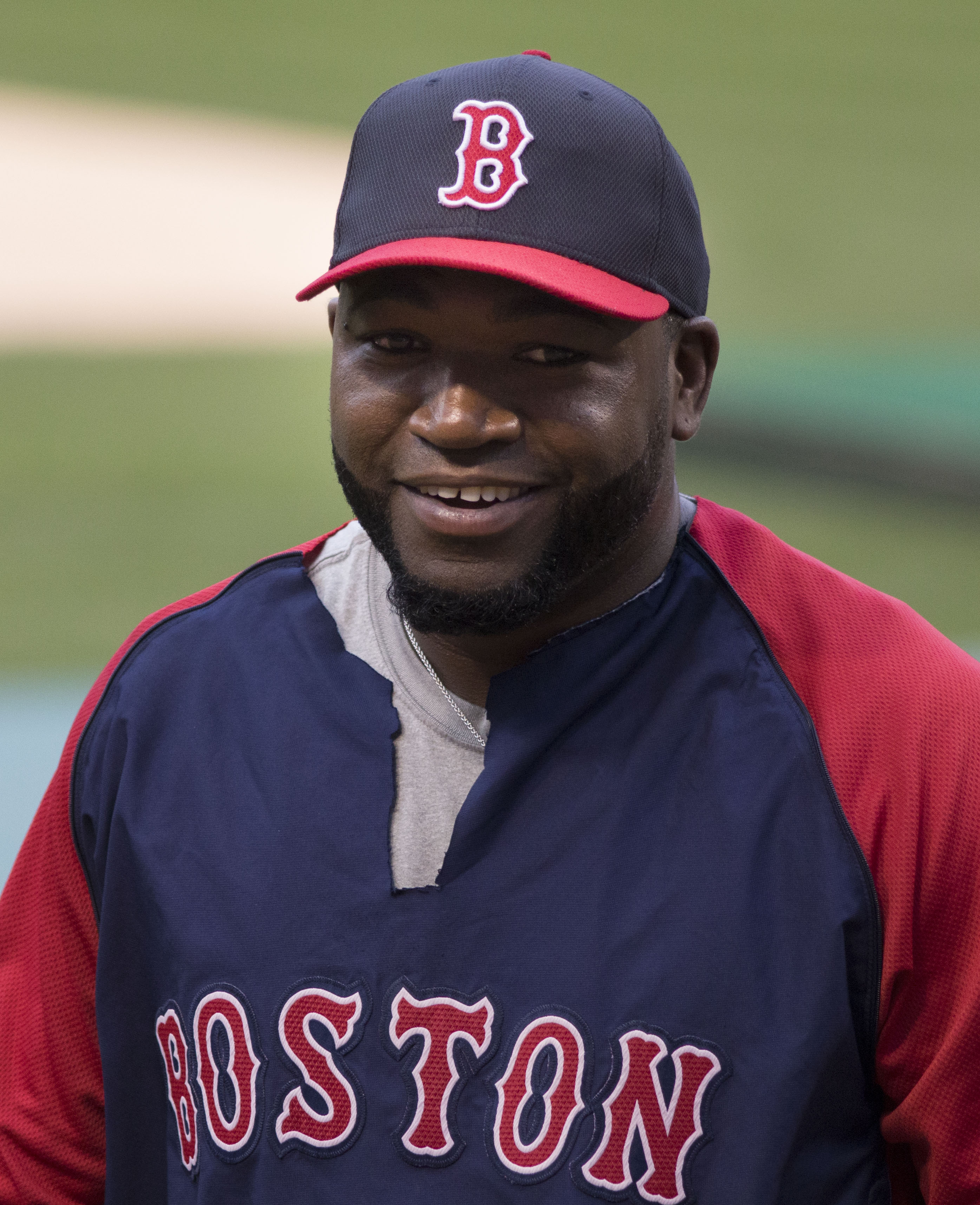
With 8 Edgar Martínez Awards, David Ortiz has the most in MLB history.

- 1973: Orlando Cepeda.
- 1975: Jim Rice.
- 1986: Don Baylor.
- 2003: David Ortiz.
- 2004: David Ortiz.
- 2005: David Ortiz.
- 2006: David Ortiz.
- 2007: David Ortiz.
- 2011: David Ortiz.
- 2013: David Ortiz.
- 2016: David Ortiz.

=== Roberto Clemente Award ===
The Roberto Clemente Award has been awarded since 1971, to the MLB player who "best exemplifies the game of baseball, sportsmanship, community involvement and the individual's contribution to his team."

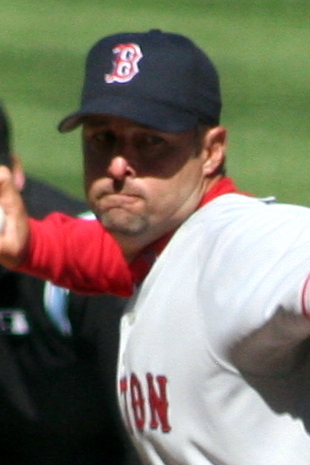
Tim Wakefield, Winner of the 2010 Roberto Clemente Award

- 2010: Tim Wakefield.
- 2011: David Ortiz.

=== DHL Hometown Heroes ===
- Ted Williams — voted by MLB fans in 2006 as the most outstanding player in the history of the franchise, based on on-field performance, leadership quality and character value

=== MLB All-Century Team ===
In 1999, the Major League Baseball All-Century Team was chosen by popular vote of fans.

- Cy Young (p)
- Roger Clemens (p)
- Lefty Grove (p)
- Babe Ruth (p)
- Ted Williams (of)

=== MLB All-Time Team ===
The Major League Baseball All-Time Team was chosen in 1997, by 36 members of the Baseball Writers' Association of America, to comprise the top manager and top player in each of 13 positional categories across MLB history.

First Team

- Ted Williams (lf)

Runners Up

- Jimmie Foxx (1b)
- Dennis Eckersley (rp)
- Joe McCarthy (manager)

Note: Babe Ruth was voted first team right fielder, but because he never played that position with Boston, he is not listed here.

=== Sporting News All-Decade Team (2009) ===
See Sporting News#Major-league baseball awards

- Team of the Decade: Boston Red Sox
- Manny Ramirez (of)
- David Ortiz (dh)
- Executive of the Decade: Theo Epstein (Red Sox GM)

=== Sports Illustrated MLB All-Decade Team ===
See List of 2009 all-decade Sports Illustrated awards and honors#MLB All-Decade Team

- David Ortiz, designated hitter (2009) (Twins–Red Sox)

=== Best MLB Player ESPY Award ===
The Best Major League Baseball Player ESPY Award has been awarded annually since 1993.

- 2000: Pedro Martínez.
- 2001: Pedro Martínez.

=== Topps All-Star Rookie teams ===
Awarded by Topps since 1959; awards appear on the following year's baseball card release.

- 1959: Pumpsie Green (2b)
- 1961: Don Schwall (p)
- 1964: Tony Conigliaro (of)
- 1965: Rico Petrocelli (ss)
- 1966: George Scott (1b)
- 1967: Reggie Smith (of)
- 1969: Mike Nagy (p)
- 1970: Billy Conigliaro (of)
- 1971: Doug Griffin (2b)
- 1972: Carlton Fisk (c)
- 1975: Fred Lynn (of) and Jim Rice (of)
- 1980: Glenn Hoffman (3b)
- 1984: Jackie Gutiérrez (ss)
- 1987: Ellis Burks (of) and Mike Greenwell (of)
- 1997: Scott Hatteberg (c) and Nomar Garciaparra (ss)
- 1999: Brian Daubach (1b)
- 2007: Dustin Pedroia (2b) and Hideki Okajima (p)
- 2011: Josh Reddick (of)
- 2013: José Iglesias (ss)
- 2014: Xander Bogaerts (ss)
- 2017: Rafael Devers (3b) and Andrew Benintendi (of)
- 2023: Masataka Yoshida (dh)
- 2025: Roman Anthony (of)

=== Fielding Bible Award ===
Awarded since 2006

- 2011: Dustin Pedroia (2b)
- 2013: Dustin Pedroia (2b)
- 2014: Dustin Pedroia (2b)
- 2016: Dustin Pedroia (2b), Mookie Betts (of)
- 2017: Mookie Betts (of)
- 2018: Mookie Betts (of)
- 2025: Ceddanne Rafaela (of)

=== Babe Ruth Award ===
The Babe Ruth Award is given annually to the MLB player with the best performance in the postseason, awarded since 1949 by the New York City chapter of the Baseball Writers' Association of America (BBWAA). From 1949─2002, the award was given to for the best performance in the World Series, but was changed from 2003 onwards to apply to the best postseason performance in general.

- 1975: Luis Tiant.
- 2004: Keith Foulke.
- 2007: Jonathan Papelbon.
- 2013: David Ortiz.
- 2018: David Price.

=== Baseball America Manager of the Year ===
See: Baseball America#Major League Baseball awards

Awarded since 1998

- 1999: Jimy Williams
- 2007: Terry Francona

=== Sporting News Manager of the Year Award ===
The Sporting News Manager of the Year Award was established in 1936 by The Sporting News and was given annually to one manager in MLB. In 1986, it was expanded to honor one manager from each league.

- 1967: Dick Williams.
- 1975: Darrell Johnson.
- 1986: John McNamara.
- 1999: Jimy Williams.
- 2013: John Farrell.

=== Associated Press Manager of the Year Award ===
Awarded by the Associated Press to a manager in each league from 1959 through 1983; awarded to one manager in MLB from 1984 through 2000; discontinued in 2001.

- 1967: Dick Williams.
- 1975: Darrell Johnson.

=== Sporting News Executive of the Year ===
- 1946: Tom Yawkey.
- 1967: Dick O'Connell.
- 1975: Dick O'Connell.
- 2013: Ben Cherington.

=== Sporting News Executive of the Decade (2009) ===
See Sporting News#Major-league baseball awards

- Theo Epstein

=== Sports Illustrated Best General Manager of the Decade (2009) ===
See List of 2009 all-decade Sports Illustrated awards and honors#Major League Baseball

- Theo Epstein

=== Baseball America Major League Executive of the Year ===
See Baseball America#Major League Baseball

- 2008: Theo Epstein

=== Lou Gorman Award ===
In September 2011, the Red Sox established an annual award in honor of Lou Gorman, given to a minor league player in the Red Sox organization "who has demonstrated dedication and perseverance in overcoming obstacles while working his way to the Major League team."

Lou Gorman Award recipients
Year	Player	Pos.	Ref.
2011	Tommy Hottovy	P	
2012	Daniel Nava	OF	
2013	Steven Wright	P	
2014	Dan Butler	C	
2015	Jonathan Aro	P	
2016	Robby Scott	P	
2017	Brian Johnson	P	
2018	Ryan Brasier	P	
2019	Trevor Kelley	P	
2021	Kutter Crawford	P	
2022	Zack Kelly	P	
2023	Brandon Walter	P	
2024	Cam Booser	P	
2025	Hunter Dobbins	P	

Note: the award was not issued for 2020, as the minor-league season was canceled amid the COVID-19 pandemic.

== Triple Crown Champions ==
=== Batting ===
Figures in parentheses are batting average, home runs, and runs batted in (RBIs)

- 1942: Ted Williams (.356, 36, 137).
- 1947: Ted Williams (.343, 32, 114).
- 1967: Carl Yastrzemski (.326, 44, 121).

=== Pitching ===
Figures in parentheses are wins, strikeouts, and earned run average (ERA)

- 1901: Cy Young (33, 158, 1.62).
- 1999: Pedro Martínez (23, 313, 2.07).

== Post-Season and All-Star Game MVP Award Winners ==
World Series MVP

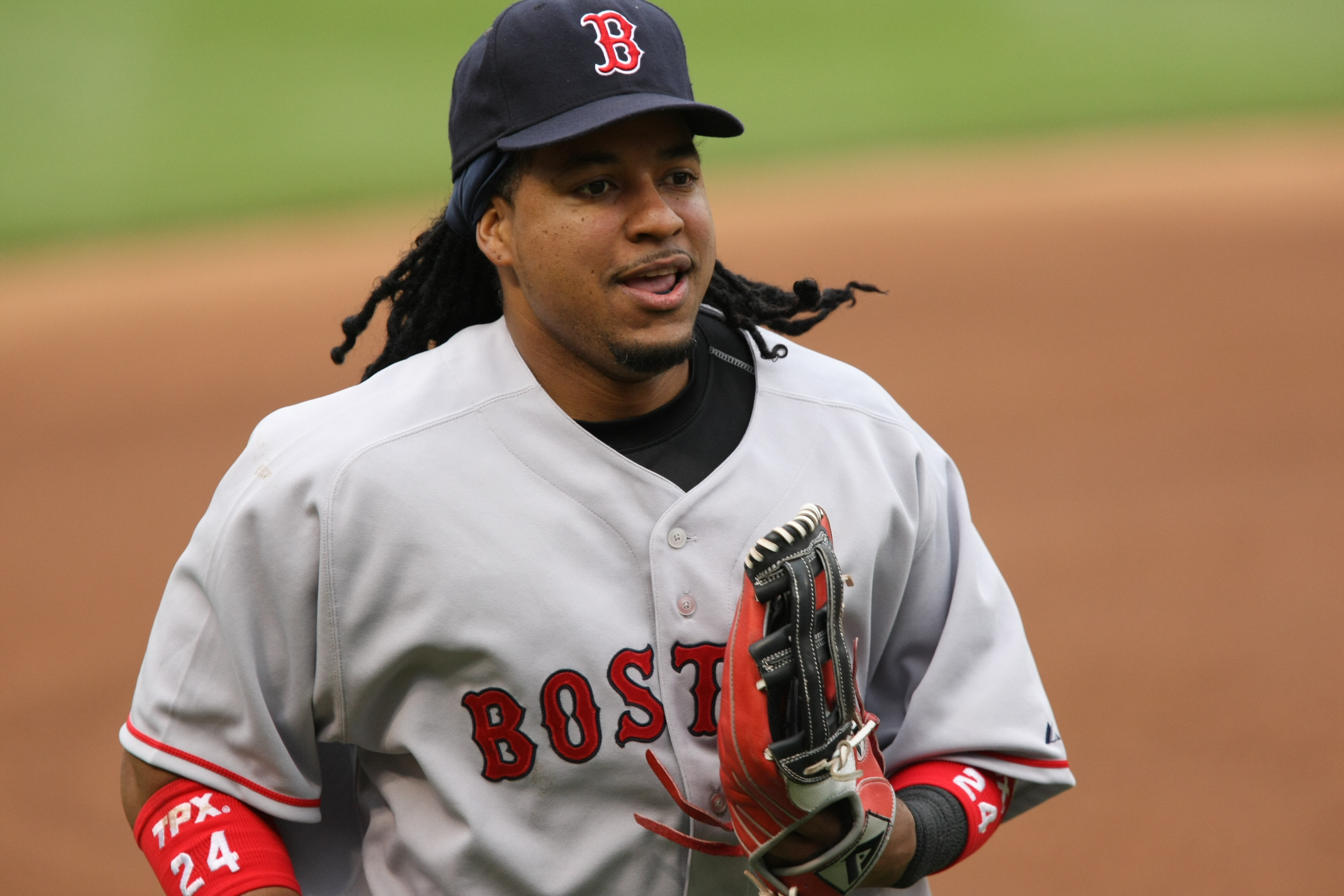
Manny Ramirez became the first Red Sox player to become World Series MVP after his performance in the 2004 World Series

- 2004: Manny Ramírez.
- 2007: Mike Lowell.
- 2013: David Ortiz.
- 2018: Steve Pearce.

Lee MacPhail MVP Award (ALCS)

- 1986: Marty Barrett.
- 2004: David Ortiz.
- 2007: Josh Beckett.
- 2013: Koji Uehara.
- 2018: Jackie Bradley Jr.

All-Star Game MVP
Note: This was re-named the Ted Williams Most Valuable Player Award in 2002.

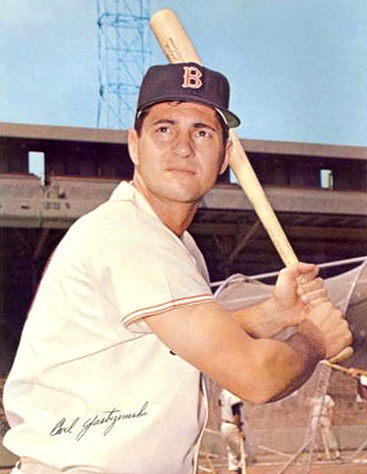
Carl Yastrzemski was the first Red Sox player to be made the All-Star Game's MVP.

- 1970: Carl Yastrzemski.
- 1986: Roger Clemens.
- 1999: Pedro Martínez.
- 2008: J. D. Drew.
- 2024: Jarren Duran.

== Team award ==
- 1975 – William Harridge Trophy (American League champion)
- 1976 – Babe Ruth League Hall of Fame
- 1986 – William Harridge Trophy (American League champion)
- 2004 – William Harridge Trophy (American League champion)
- 2004 – Commissioner's Trophy (World Series)
- 2004 – Sports Illustrated Sportsman of the Year
- 2005 (2004 Boston Red Sox) – Outstanding Team ESPY Award
- 2005 – Laureus World Sports Awards (Spirit of Sport Award)
- 2007 – William Harridge Trophy (American League champion)
- 2007 – Commissioner's Trophy (World Series)
- 2009 – Sporting News Team of the Decade
- 2010 – Commissioner's Award for Philanthropic Excellence
- 2013 – William Harridge Trophy (American League champion)
- 2013 – Commissioner's Trophy (World Series)
- 2013 – Philadelphia Sports Writers Association Team of the Year

== Team captains ==
- Doc Gessler (1909)
- Harry Hooper (1918–1920)
- Everett Scott (1921)
- Carl Yastrzemski (1966,1969–1983)
- Jim Rice (1985–1989)
- Jason Varitek (2005–2011)

== Other achievements ==
=== Baseball Hall of Famers ===
See: Boston Red Sox § Baseball Hall of Famers.

=== Ford C. Frick Award recipients ===
See: Boston Red Sox § Ford C. Frick Award recipients.

=== Retired numbers ===
See: Boston Red Sox § Retired numbers.

=== World Baseball Classic All–WBC Team ===
- 2009 – Daisuke Matsuzaka (P) (2009 World Baseball Classic § All-WBC team)

=== Associated Press Athlete of the Year ===
- 1957 — Ted Williams.
- 1967 — Carl Yastrzemski.
- 1975 — Fred Lynn.

=== Hickok Belt ===
Note: The Hickok Belt trophy was awarded to the top professional athlete of the year in the U.S., from 1950 to 1976.

=== Sports Illustrated Sportsman of the Year ===
See navigation box below and Sportsman of the Year

=== Sports Illustrated Top 10 Coaches/Managers of the Decade (2009) ===
See: List of 2009 all-decade Sports Illustrated awards and honors § Top 10 Coaches/Managers of the Decade.

- No. 4 – Terry Francona (the list's only other MLB manager was the New York Yankees and Los Angeles Dodgers' Joe Torre, No. 3)

=== Sports Illustrated Top 10 GMs/Executives of the Decade (2009) ===
See: List of 2009 all-decade Sports Illustrated awards and honors § Top 10 GMs/Executives of the Decade.

- No. 3 – Theo Epstein (the list's only other MLB GMs were Seattle and Philadelphia's Pat Gillick, No. 7, and Oakland's Billy Beane, No. 10)

=== United States Sports Academy "Carl Maddox Sport Management Award" ===
- 2007 – Theo Epstein

== Single-season leaders ==
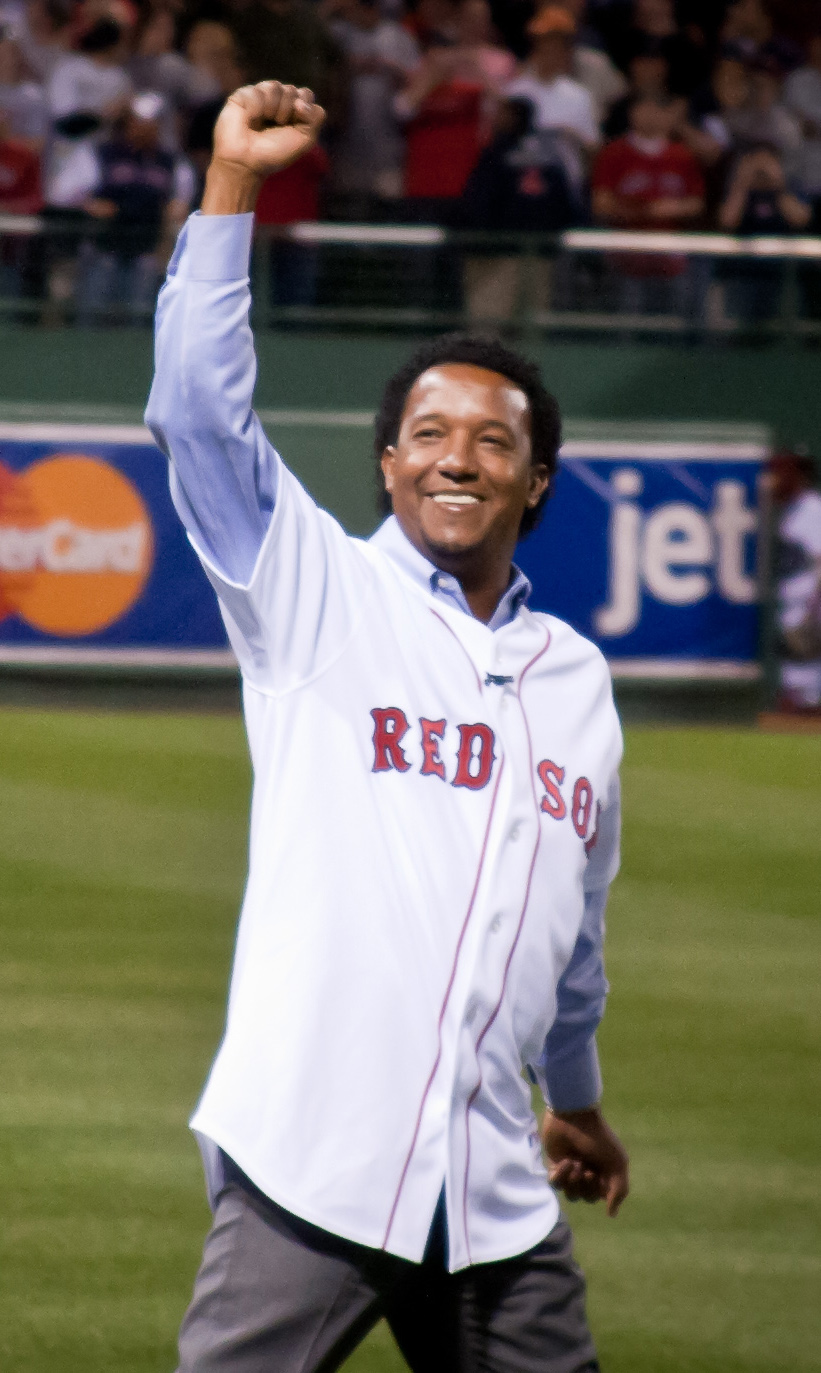
Pedro Martínez led MLB in ERA in 1999, 2000, 2002 & 2003.

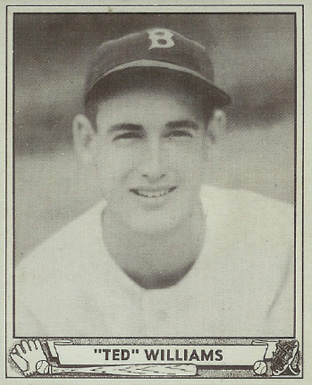
After finishing the 1941 season with a batting average of .406, Ted Williams became the last player in MLB to reach a season batting average of .400 or above.

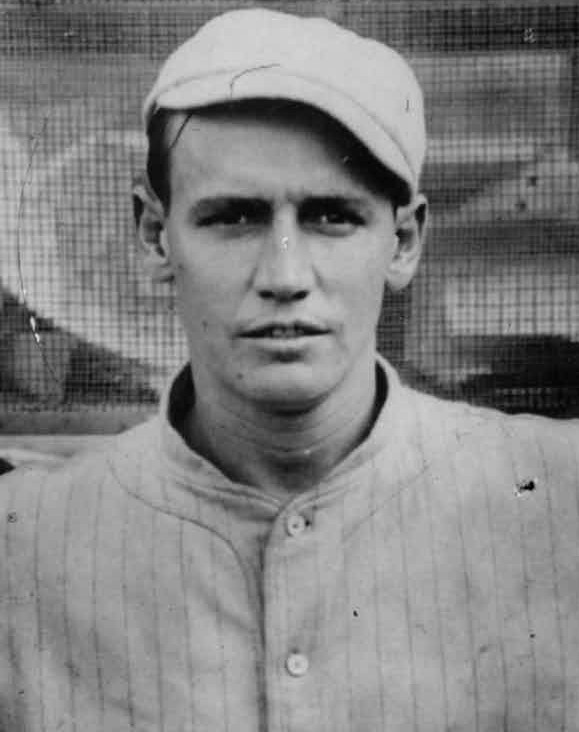
With 34 wins in 1912, "Smoky Joe" Wood leads the Red Sox for most pitching wins in a season.

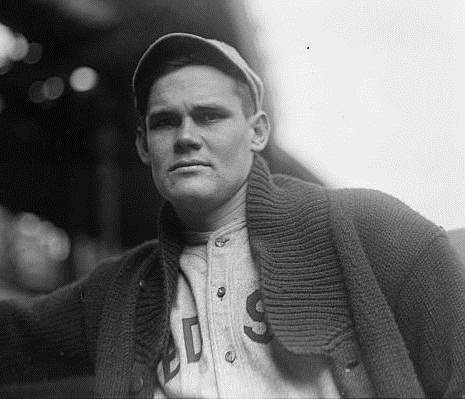
Dutch Leonard's ERA of 0.96 in the 1914 season remains the best single-season ERA in American League history.

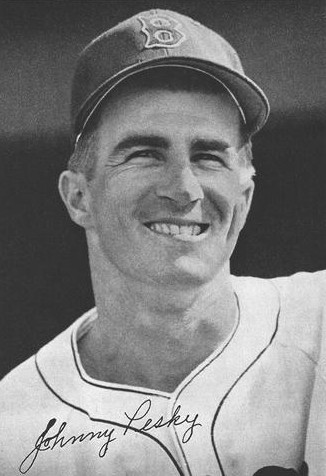
Johnny Pesky led the American League in hits for three seasons, two of those seasons he also led MLB in hits.

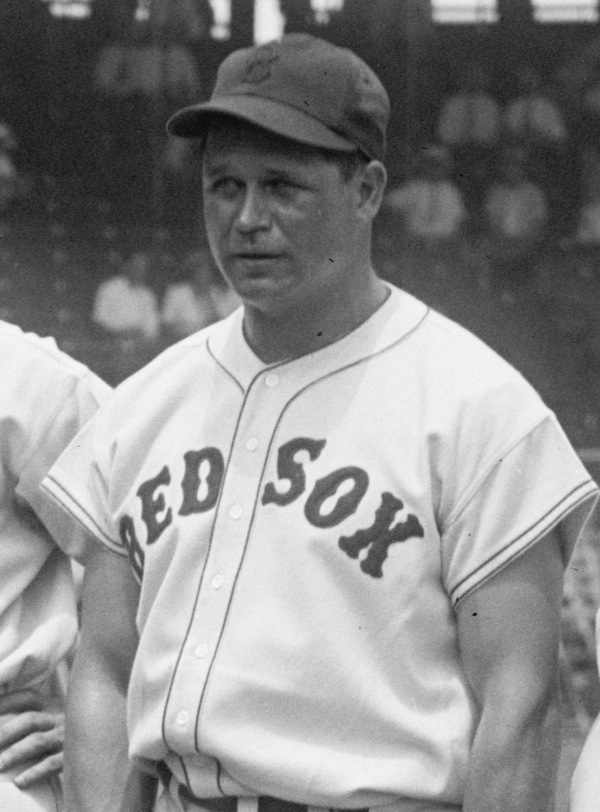
Jimmie Foxx was the first Red Sox player to lead MLB in Batting Average.

=== Pitchers ===
- Winning games leaders
  - 1901: Cy Young (MLB Leader; 33 Wins).
  - 1902: Cy Young (MLB Leader; 32 Wins).
  - 1903: Cy Young (AL Leader; 28 Wins).
  - 1912: Smoky Joe Wood (MLB Leader; 34 Wins).
  - 1935: Wes Ferrell (AL Leader; 25 Wins).
  - 1942: Tex Hughson (MLB Leader; 22 Wins).
  - 1955: Frank Sullivan (AL Leader; 18 Wins).
  - 1967: Jim Lonborg (MLB Leader; 22 Wins).
  - 1986: Roger Clemens (MLB Leader; 24 Wins).
  - 1987: Roger Clemens (MLB Leader; 20 Wins).
  - 1999: Pedro Martínez (MLB Leader; 23 Wins).
  - 2004: Curt Schilling (MLB Leader; 21 Wins).
  - 2007: Josh Beckett (MLB Leader; 20 Wins).
  - 2016: Rick Porcello (MLB Leader; 22 Wins).
- Saves Leaders
  - 1903: Bill Dinneen and Cy Young (2) (AL Leaders).
  - 1909: Frank Arellanes (8) (MLB Leader).
  - 1911: Charley Hall (4) (AL Leader).
  - 1915: Carl Mays (7) (AL Leader).
  - 1919: Allen Russell (5) (MLB Leader).
  - 1931: Wilcy Moore (10) (AL Leader).
  - 1946: Bob Klinger (9) (MLB Leader).
  - 1951: Ellis Kinder (14) (MLB Leader).
  - 1953: Ellis Kinder (27) (MLB Leader).
  - 1960: Mike Fornieles (14) (AL Leader).
  - 1962: Dick Radatz (24) (AL Leader).
  - 1964: Dick Radatz (29) (MLB Leader).
  - 1977: Bill Campbell (31) (AL Leader).
  - 1998: Tom Gordon (46) (AL Leader).
  - 2000: Derek Lowe (42) (AL Leader).
- Strikeouts Leaders
  - 1901: Cy Young (AL Leader; 158K).
  - 1942: Tex Hughson (AL Leader; 113K).
  - 1967: Jim Lonborg (AL Leader; 246K).
  - 1988: Roger Clemens (MLB Leader; 291K).
  - 1991: Roger Clemens (MLB Leader; 241K).
  - 1996: Roger Clemens (AL Leader; 257K).
  - 1999: Pedro Martínez (AL Leader; 313K).
  - 2000: Pedro Martínez (AL Leader; 284K).
  - 2001: Hideo Nomo (AL Leader; 220K).
  - 2002: Pedro Martínez (AL Leader; 239K).
  - 2017: Chris Sale (MLB Leader; 308K).
- ERA leaders
  - 1901: Cy Young (MLB Leader; 1.62).
  - 1914: Dutch Leonard (MLB Leader; 0.96).
  - 1915: Smoky Joe Wood (AL Leader; 1.49).
  - 1916: Babe Ruth (AL Leader; 1.75).
  - 1935: Lefty Grove (AL Leader; 2.70).
  - 1936: Lefty Grove (AL Leader; 2.81).
  - 1938: Lefty Grove (AL Leader; 3.08).
  - 1939: Lefty Grove (AL Leader; 2.54).
  - 1972: Luis Tiant (MLB Leader; 1.91).
  - 1986: Roger Clemens (AL Leader; 2.48).
  - 1990: Roger Clemens (MLB Leader; 1.93).
  - 1991: Roger Clemens (AL Leader; 2.62).
  - 1992: Roger Clemens (AL Leader; 2.41).
  - 1999: Pedro Martínez (MLB Leader; 2.07).
  - 2000: Pedro Martínez (MLB Leader; 1.74).
  - 2002: Pedro Martínez (MLB Leader; 2.26).
  - 2003: Pedro Martínez (MLB Leader; 2.22).
- WHIP Leaders
  - 1901: Cy Young (0.97) (MLB Leader).
  - 1904: Cy Young (0.94) (MLB Leader).
  - 1905: Cy Young (0.87) (MLB Leader).
  - 1907: Cy Young (0.98) (AL Leader).
  - 1914: Dutch Leonard (0.89) (MLB Leader).
  - 1935: Lefty Grove (1.22) (AL Leader).
  - 1936: Lefty Grove (1.19) (AL Leader).
  - 1944: Tex Hughson (1.05) (MLB Leader).
  - 1957: Frank Sullivan (1.06) (MLB Leader).
  - 1973: Luis Tiant (1.08) (AL Leader).
  - 1986: Roger Clemens (0.97) (AL Leader).
  - 1992: Roger Clemens (1.07) (AL Leader).
  - 1999: Pedro Martínez (0.92) (MLB Leader).
  - 2000: Pedro Martínez (0.74) (MLB Leader).
  - 2002: Pedro Martínez (0.92) (MLB Leader).
  - 2003: Pedro Martínez (1.04) (AL Leader).
- Shutout Leaders
  - 1901: Cy Young (5) (AL Leader).
  - 1903: Cy Young (7) (MLB Leader).
  - 1904: Cy Young (10) (MLB Leader).
  - 1912: "Smoky Joe" Wood (10) (MLB Leader).
  - 1916: Babe Ruth (9) (AL Leader).
  - 1917: Carl Mays (8) (MLB Leader).
  - 1921: "Sad Sam" Jones (5) (MLB Leader).
  - 1929: Danny MacFayden (4) (AL Leader).
  - 1936: Lefty Grove (6) (MLB Leader).
  - 1949: Ellis Kinder (6) (MLB Leader).
  - 1974: Luis Tiant (7) (MLB Leader).
  - 1984: Bob Ojeda (5) (MLB Leader).
  - 1987: Roger Clemens (7) (MLB Leader).
  - 1988: Roger Clemens (8) (MLB Leader).
  - 1990: Roger Clemens (4) (MLB Leader).
  - 1991: Roger Clemens (4) (AL Leader).
  - 1992: Roger Clemens (5) (MLB Leader).
  - 2000: Pedro Martínez (4) (MLB Leader).
  - 2008: Jon Lester (2) (AL Leader).
  - 2022: Nathan Eovaldi (1) (MLB Leader).

=== Hitters ===
- Batting champions
  - 1938: Jimmie Foxx (.349) (MLB Leader).
  - 1941: Ted Williams (.406) (MLB Leader).
  - 1942: Ted Williams (.356) (MLB Leader).
  - 1947: Ted Williams (.343) (AL Leader; 2nd in MLB).
  - 1948: Ted Williams (.369) (AL).
  - 1950: Billy Goodman (.354) (MLB).
  - 1957: Ted Williams (.388) (MLB).
  - 1958: Ted Williams (.328) (AL).
  - 1960: Pete Runnels (.320) (AL).
  - 1962: Pete Runnels (.326) (AL).
  - 1963: Carl Yastrzemski (.321) (AL).
  - 1967: Carl Yastrzemski (.326) (AL).
  - 1968: Carl Yastrzemski (.301) (AL).
  - 1979: Fred Lynn (.333) (AL).
  - 1981: Carney Lansford (.336) (AL).
  - 1983: Wade Boggs (.361) (MLB).
  - 1985: Wade Boggs (.368) (MLB).
  - 1986: Wade Boggs (.357) (MLB).
  - 1987: Wade Boggs (.363) (AL).
  - 1988: Wade Boggs (.366) (MLB).
  - 1999: Nomar Garciaparra (.357) (AL).
  - 2000: Nomar Garciaparra (.372) (AL).
  - 2002: Manny Ramírez (.349) (AL).
  - 2003: Bill Mueller (.326) (AL).
  - 2018: Mookie Betts (.346) (MLB).
- Home run leaders
  - 1910: Jake Stahl (10) (MLB Leader).
  - 1918: Babe Ruth (11) (MLB Leader).
  - 1919: Babe Ruth (29) (MLB Leader).
  - 1939: Jimmie Foxx (35) (MLB Leader).
  - 1941: Ted Williams (37) (MLB Leader).
  - 1942: Ted Williams (36) (MLB Leader).
  - 1947: Ted Williams (32) (AL Leader).
  - 1949: Ted Williams (43) (AL Leader).
  - 1965: Tony Conigliaro (32) (AL Leader).
  - 1967: Carl Yastrzemski (44) (MLB Leader).
  - 1977: Jim Rice (39) (AL Leader).
  - 1978: Jim Rice (46) (MLB Leader).
  - 1981: Dwight Evans (22) (AL Leader).
  - 1983: Jim Rice (39) (AL Leader).
  - 1984: Tony Armas (43) (MLB Leader).
  - 2004: Manny Ramírez (43) (AL Leader).
  - 2006: David Ortiz (54) (AL Leader).
- Triples Leaders
  - 1904: Buck Freeman and Chick Stahl (19) (MLB Leaders).
  - 1950: Dom DiMaggio and Bobby Doerr (11) (AL Leaders).
  - 1956: Jackie Jensen (11) (AL Leader).
  - 1972: Carlton Fisk (9) (AL Leader).
  - 1978: Jim Rice (15) (MLB Leader).
  - 1997: Nomar Garciaparra (11) (AL Leader).
  - 2002: Johnny Damon (11) (MLB Leader).
  - 2009: Jacoby Ellsbury (10) (AL Leader).
  - 2024: Jarren Duran (14) (AL Leader).
- Doubles Leaders
  - 1912: Tris Speaker (53) (MLB Leader).
  - 1914: Tris Speaker (46) (MLB Leader).
  - 1931: Earl Webb (67) (MLB Leader).
  - 1938: Joe Cronin (51) (MLB Leader).
  - 1948: Ted Williams (44) (AL Leader).
  - 1949: Ted Williams (39) (AL Leader).
  - 1956: Jimmy Piersall (40) (MLB Leader).
  - 1963: Carl Yastrzemski (40) (AL Leader).
  - 1965: Carl Yastrzemski (45) (MLB Leader).
  - 1966: Carl Yastrzemski (39) (AL Leader).
  - 1968: Reggie Smith (37) (AL Leader).
  - 1971: Reggie Smith (33) (AL Leader).
  - 1975: Fred Lynn (47) (MLB Leader).
  - 1988: Wade Boggs (45) (MLB Leader).
  - 1989: Wade Boggs (51) (MLB Leader).
  - 1990: Jody Reed (45) (MLB Leader).
  - 1997: John Valentin (47) (AL Leader).
  - 2002: Nomar Garciaparra (56) (MLB Leader).
  - 2008: Dustin Pedroia (54) (MLB Leader).
  - 2010: Adrián Beltré (49) (MLB Leader).
  - 2016: David Ortiz (48) (MLB Leader).
  - 2019: Rafael Devers (54) (AL Leader).
  - 2021: J. D. Martinez (42) (MLB Leader).
- Hits Leaders
  - 1903: Patsy Dougherty (195) (AL Leader).
  - 1914: Tris Speaker (193) (AL Leader).
  - 1938: Joe Vosmik (201) (AL Leader).
  - 1940: Doc Cramer (200) (MLB Leader).
  - 1942: Johnny Pesky (205) (MLB Leader).
  - 1946: Johnny Pesky (208) (AL Leader).
  - 1947: Johnny Pesky (207) (MLB Leader).
  - 1963: Carl Yastrzemski (183) (AL Leader).
  - 1967: Carl Yastrzemski (189) (AL Leader).
  - 1978: Jim Rice (213) (MLB Leader).
  - 1985: Wade Boggs (240) (MLB Leader).
  - 1997: Nomar Garciaparra (209) (AL Leader).
  - 2008: Dustin Pedroia (213) (MLB Leader).
  - 2011: Adrián González (213) (MLB Leader).
- RBI leaders
  - 1902: Buck Freeman (121) (MLB Leader).
  - 1903: Buck Freeman (104) (MLB Leader).
  - 1919: Babe Ruth (114) (MLB Leader).
  - 1938: Jimmie Foxx (175) (MLB Leader).
  - 1939: Ted Williams (145) (MLB Leader).
  - 1942: Ted Williams (137) (MLB Leader).
  - 1947: Ted Williams (114) (AL Leader).
  - 1949: Vern Stephens and Ted Williams (159) (MLB Leader).
  - 1950: Walt Dropo and Vern Stephens (144) (MLB Leader).
  - 1955: Jackie Jensen (116) (AL Leader).
  - 1958: Jackie Jensen (122) (AL Leader).
  - 1959: Jackie Jensen (112) (AL Leader).
  - 1963: Dick Stuart (118) (AL Leader).
  - 1967: Carl Yastrzemski (121) (MLB Leader).
  - 1968: Ken Harrelson (109) (MLB Leader).
  - 1978: Jim Rice (139) (MLB Leader).
  - 1983: Jim Rice (126) (MLB Leader).
  - 1984: Tony Armas (123) (MLB Leader).
  - 1995: Mo Vaughn (126) (AL Leader).
  - 2005: David Ortiz (148) (MLB Leader).
  - 2006: David Ortiz (137) (AL Leader).
  - 2016: David Ortiz (127) (AL Leader).
  - 2018: J.D. Martinez (130) (MLB Leader).

== See also ==
- Ted Williams Most Valuable Player Award (All-Star Game)
- Tony Conigliaro Award
- Baseball awards
- List of MLB awards

Achievements
Preceded by None (First); Philadelphia Athletics; Boston Braves; Chicago White Sox; Florida Marlins; St. Louis Cardinals; San Francisco Giants; Houston Astros	World Series Championships; 1903; 1912; 1915 & 1916; 1918; 2004; 2007; 2013; 2018	Succeeded by New York Giants; Philadelphia Athletics; Chicago White Sox; Cincinnati Reds; Chicago White Sox; Philadelphia Phillies; San Francisco Giants; Washington Nationals
