= Ryan Brasier =

American baseball player (born 1987)

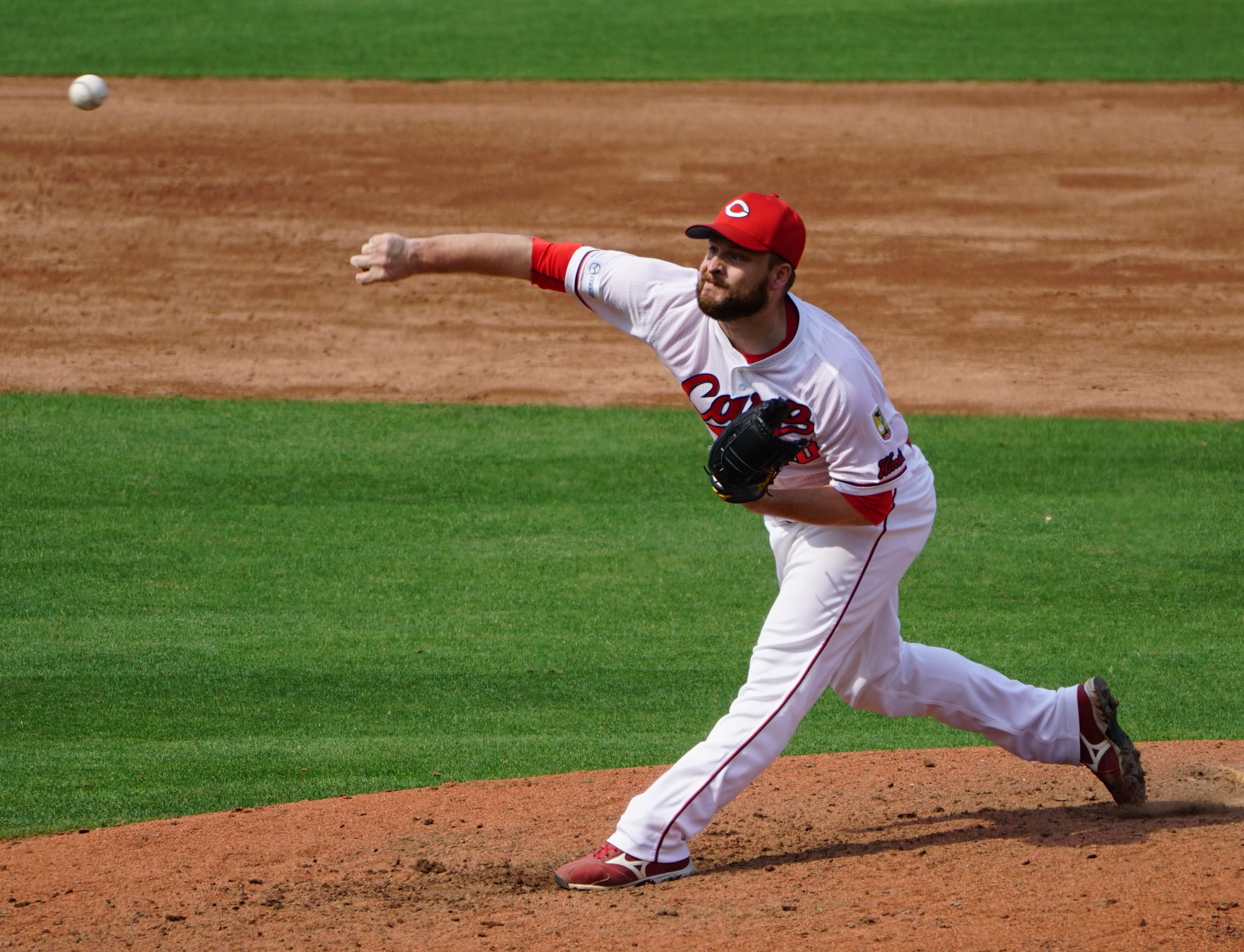
- Brasier with the Hiroshima Toyo Carp in 2017

Free agent
- Pitcher
- Born: August 26, 1987 (age 38); Wichita Falls, Texas, U.S.
- Bats: Right Throws: Right

Professional debut
- MLB: May 2, 2013, for the Los Angeles Angels of Anaheim
- NPB: March 31, 2017, for the Hiroshima Toyo Carp

MLB statistics (through 2025 season)
- Win–loss record: 10–9
- Earned run average: 3.90
- Strikeouts: 301

NPB statistics (through 2017 season)
- Win–loss record: 2–1
- Earned run average: 3.00
- Strikeouts: 19
- Stats at Baseball Reference

Teams
- Los Angeles Angels of Anaheim (2013); Hiroshima Toyo Carp (2017); Boston Red Sox (2018–2023); Los Angeles Dodgers (2023–2024); Chicago Cubs (2025)

Career highlights and awards
- 2× World Series champion (2018, 2024)

Ryan David Brasier (born August 26, 1987) is an American professional baseball pitcher who is a free agent. He has previously played in Major League Baseball (MLB) for the Los Angeles Angels, Boston Red Sox, Los Angeles Dodgers, and Chicago Cubs, and in Nippon Professional Baseball (NPB) for the Hiroshima Toyo Carp. Listed at 6 feet 0 inches (1.83 m) and 225 pounds (102 kg), he both throws and bats right-handed. Brasier won the World Series with the Red Sox in 2018 and with the Dodgers in 2024.

== Career ==
=== Amateur career ===
Brasier attended S. H. Rider High School in Wichita Falls, Texas. He played for the school's baseball team as a catcher as they had other talented pitchers, including Chase Anderson. He enrolled at Weatherford College in Weatherford, Texas, to play college baseball in 2006-07.

=== Los Angeles Angels ===
The Los Angeles Angels of Anaheim selected Brasier in the sixth round of the 2007 Major League Baseball draft. From 2007 through 2013, Brasier pitched for various Angels farm teams, starting with the Rookie League Orem Owlz and reaching the Triple-A Salt Lake Bees. He made a career-high 55 appearances (all in relief) with the Bees in 2012, recording 13 saves along with a 7–3 record, 54 strikeouts, and 24 walks in 59 2/3 innings pitched.

The Angels promoted Brasier to the major leagues for the first time on May 1, 2013. He made his MLB debut the next day, pitching an inning of relief against the Baltimore Orioles, allowing two runs on two hits. His first MLB strikeout was of Ryan Flaherty. After making one additional appearance in May, he returned to the minors and was recalled in September when the major league rosters expanded; he made five appearances during the month. Overall, with the 2013 Angels, Brasier made seven appearances, striking out seven and walking four in nine innings pitched with a 2.00 ERA. Brasier missed the entire 2014 season after undergoing Tommy John surgery and was outrighted off of the Angels 40-man roster on October 28, 2014.

=== Oakland Athletics ===
On July 7, 2015, Brasier signed a minor league deal with the Oakland Athletics and spent the 2015 season rehabbing from the surgery, only appearing in six rehab games in the minors. In 2016, he made 46 relief appearances with the Triple-A Nashville Sounds, recording a 3.56 ERA in 60 2/3 innings.

=== Hiroshima Toyo Carp ===
Brasier was invited to major league spring training by the Athletics in 2017 but took the opportunity to make more money overseas and agreed to have his contract sold to the Hiroshima Toyo Carp of Nippon Professional Baseball on December 14, 2016. With the Carp, he made 26 relief appearances; in 30 innings of work he struck out 19, walked eight, and had a 3.00 ERA. He would later credit his time in Japan with helping him improve his pitching mechanics.

=== Boston Red Sox ===
Brasier staged a showcase for major league teams in January 2018 with the hopes of signing a contract before spring training began but did not get any takers until signing a minor league contract with the Boston Red Sox on March 4, 2018. He was assigned to the Pawtucket Red Sox of the Triple-A International League, where he pitched in 46 games with a 3.71 ERA and 70 strikeouts and was selected to appear in the Triple-A All-Star Game. The Red Sox promoted him to the major leagues on July 8 and he made his Boston debut the next day, pitching one inning against the Texas Rangers and retiring the side in order. On August 30, Brasier recorded his first MLB win, pitching an inning of scoreless relief in a come-from-behind victory over the Chicago White Sox. He proved to be a consistent reliever down the stretch, finishing with a 1.60 ERA in 34 appearances, and was the recipient of the Red Sox' Lou Gorman Award. Brasier was included on Boston's postseason roster, making a total of nine appearances and allowing one earned run in 8 2/3 innings, as Boston went on to win the World Series.

Brasier was included on Boston's Opening Day roster to start the 2019 season and on April 3, he recorded his first major league save in closing out a win over the Athletics. Overall with the 2019 Red Sox, Brasier appeared in 62 games, compiling a 2–4 record with seven saves, along with a 4.85 ERA and 61 strikeouts in 55 2/3 innings.

During the COVID-19 shortened 2020 season, Brasier appeared in 25 games (one start), compiling a 1–0 record with 3.96 ERA and 30 strikeouts in 25 innings pitched. In early December 2020, he reached a one-year deal with the Red Sox for the 2021 season, avoiding salary arbitration. Before appearing in a 2021 game, Brasier was placed on the 60-day injured list with a calf injury on May 3 and while rehabbing, on June 3, he was hospitalized after being hit in the head by a line drive during a simulated game at Boston's training complex in Fort Myers, Florida. Brasier returned to the Red Sox on September 1. Overall during the 2021 regular season, he made 13 appearances with Boston, all in relief, compiling a 1.50 ERA and 1–1 record while striking out nine batters in 12 innings. He also made seven relief appearances in the postseason, as the Red Sox advanced to the American League Championship Series. On November 30, the Red Sox agreed to terms with him (in his second season of arbitration) on a one-year contract for 2022, reportedly worth $1.4 million.

Brasier began the 2022 season as a member of Boston's bullpen. In 68 relief appearances with the Red Sox, Brasier posted an 0–3 record with a 5.78 ERA and one save while striking out 64 batters in 62 1/3 innings.

On January 13, 2023, the Red Sox and Brasier reached agreement on another one-year contract, avoiding arbitration. He struggled in 2023, as he worked to a 7.29 ERA with 18 strikeouts in 20 relief appearances. On May 14, Brasier was designated for assignment by Boston, hours after he allowed three runs in a relief appearance against the St. Louis Cardinals at Fenway Park. Following the roster move, Brasier told reporters, "Honestly, a new start might not be bad. Obviously getting to play at Fenway every day is a dream come true. Two parks you want to play at growing up are Yankee Stadium and Fenway. And I got to do both a lot. So grateful.” He was released by the team on May 21.

=== Los Angeles Dodgers ===
On June 5, 2023, Brasier signed a minor league contract with the Los Angeles Dodgers organization. He made two scoreless appearances for the Triple-A Oklahoma City Dodgers before he was selected to the major league roster on June 20. In the majors, he pitched in 38 2/3 innings over 39 games, with an 0.70 ERA while also allowing one run in 2 1/3 innings in the 2023 NLDS.

The Dodgers re-signed Brasier to a two-year, $9 million contract on February 8, 2024. He posted a 4.63 ERA in 12 games before he was placed on the injured list with a right calf strain on April 29. Brasier was transferred to the 60–day injured list on June 13, and activated on August 17. Overall he pitched in 29 games, with a 3.54 ERA in 28 innings. Brasier allowed two runs in 3 2/3 innings in the 2024 NLDS, two runs in 3 1/3 innings in the 2024 NLCS and one run in two innings in the 2024 World Series, which the Dodgers won.

On January 30, 2025, the Dodgers designated Brasier for assignment.

=== Chicago Cubs ===
On February 4, 2025, the Dodgers traded Brasier to the Chicago Cubs in exchange for a player to be named later or cash. Brasier made 28 appearances (one start) for the Cubs, compiling an 0-1 record and 4.50 ERA with 20 strikeouts over 26 innings of work.

=== Texas Rangers ===
On February 6, 2026, Brasier signed a minor league contract with the Texas Rangers. He was released by the Rangers prior to the start of the regular season on March 21. On March 27, Brasier re-signed with the Rangers on a new minor league contract. He made 22 appearances (including two starts) for the Triple-A Round Rock Express, compiling an 0-1 record and 3.97 ERA with 23 strikeouts and three saves across 22 2/3 innings pitched. Brasier was released by the Rangers organization on June 1.

Awards
Preceded by Brian Johnson	Lou Gorman Award; 2018	Succeeded by Trevor Kelley
