= Robby Scott =

American baseball player (born 1989)

- Pitcher
- Born: August 29, 1989 (age 36); Miami, Florida, U.S.
- Batted: Switch Threw: Left

MLB debut
- September 2, 2016, for the Boston Red Sox

Last MLB appearance
- September 27, 2019, for the Arizona Diamondbacks

MLB statistics
- Win–loss record: 4–2
- Earned run average: 4.04
- Strikeouts: 53
- Stats at Baseball Reference

Teams
- Boston Red Sox (2016–2018); Arizona Diamondbacks (2019)

Robert John Scott (born August 29, 1989) is an American former professional baseball pitcher. He played in Major League Baseball (MLB) for the Boston Red Sox and Arizona Diamondbacks.

== Amateur career ==
Scott attended St. Thomas Aquinas High School in Fort Lauderdale, Florida. He enrolled at Broward Community College, where he played college baseball during the 2008 and 2009 seasons. He then transferred to Florida State University and played for the Florida State Seminoles in the 2010 and 2011 seasons.

== Professional career ==
=== Yuma Scorpions ===
Scott went undrafted in the 2011 MLB draft, and subsequently played for the Yuma Scorpions of the North American League, an independent baseball league. Scott posted a 2–1 record with a 0.75 earned run average (ERA) and two saves in 13 games for Yuma.

=== Boston Red Sox ===
==== Minor leagues ====
On August 10, 2011, the Boston Red Sox purchased Scott's contract. Overall, he collected 35 strikeouts while giving up only 12 hits and six walks in 24 innings pitched, including 19 strikeouts over 11 scoreless innings for Yuma. Al Nipper, a former Red Sox pitcher, scouted Scott for Boston.

Scott played in four games for the Rookie League Gulf Coast League Red Sox and two games for the Low–A Lowell Spinners in 2011, posting an overall 1–1 record with 1.38 ERA in 13 innings pitched. He then spent the 2012 season with the Gulf Coast League Red Sox, making 14 appearances with a 0.44 ERA in 20 1/3 innings pitched, including one save. In 2013, he was promoted directly to the High–A Salem Red Sox, where he made 31 appearances, going 4–4 with a 2.79 ERA and two saves. He played the 2014 season with the Double–A Portland Sea Dogs, where he compiled an 8–2 record with a 1.96 ERA and three saves, while recording a strikeout-to-walk ratio of 3.40 (51-to-15) in 59 2/3 innings. During that season, he was selected to the Eastern League All-Star game, and late in the year pitched for the Surprise Saguaros of the Arizona Fall League.

Scott appeared in 27 games (including two starts) between Double-A Portland and the Triple–A Pawtucket Red Sox through July 10, 2015, compiling a 2–1 record with a 2.09 ERA while striking out 49 in 51 2/3 innings. After that, he earned his second consecutive trip to the Eastern League All-Star Game and was moved to Pawtucket for the third time in the season following the All-Star break. Overall, Scott went 2–2 with a 4.42 ERA and one save in 75 1/3 innings of work.

Scott made six starts and 26 relief appearances for Pawtucket in 2016. He went 4–3 with a 2.54 ERA, striking out 73 with 14 walks in 78 innings, and held left-handed hitters to a .147 average (14-for-95), .206 on-base percentage and .253 slugging percentage. Scott received the PawSox Most Valuable Pitcher Award.

==== Major leagues ====
Scott was added to Boston's active roster and made his major league debut on September 2, 2016, against the Oakland Athletics; he pitched a scoreless ninth inning, striking out the first two batters he faced, Billy Butler and Matt McBride. Overall with the 2016 Red Sox, Scott went 1–0 without giving up a run in seven appearances, striking out five and walking two in six innings pitched. He was also the recipient of the Red Sox' Lou Gorman Award. Scott was not included on Boston's postseason roster for the 2016 ALDS against the Cleveland Indians.

Scott split time in 2017 between Boston and Triple-A Pawtucket. In Triple-A, he made seven appearances, giving up no runs in 7 1/3 innings pitched. With the 2017 Red Sox, he appeared in 57 games, compiling a 3.79 ERA with 2–1 record, while striking out 31 batters and walking 13 in 35 2/3 innings pitched. He was again not on Boston's postseason roster, when they faced the Houston Astros in the 2017 ALDS.

Scott started the 2018 season with Triple-A Pawtucket, as Boston's new manager Alex Cora selected Bobby Poyner as the left-handed specialist in his bullpen. Scott was added to Boston's active roster on June 19, made one appearance, and was optioned back to Pawtucket on June 23. He was recalled to Boston on July 11, made one appearance, and returned to Pawtucket on July 14. Scott was called up to Boston on September 1, when rosters expanded. Overall with the 2018 Red Sox, Scott made nine relief appearances, pitching 6 2/3 innings with a record of 0–1 and an 8.10 ERA. Scott was not included on Boston's postseason roster, as the team went on to win the World Series over the Los Angeles Dodgers.

=== Arizona Diamondbacks ===
On December 10, 2018, the Cincinnati Reds claimed Scott off of waivers. On December 30, 2018, the Reds traded Scott to the Arizona Diamondbacks in exchange for cash considerations. Scott started the 2019 season with the Reno Aces of the Pacific Coast League, the Diamondbacks' Triple-A affiliate. He appeared in 11 games for the Diamondbacks, compiling a 4.91 ERA with 9 strikeouts over 7 1/3 innings pitched. Scott was outrighted by the Diamondbacks on October 31, 2019. He elected free agency following the season on November 4.

=== Sugar Land Skeeters ===
On April 24, 2020, Scott signed with the High Point Rockers of the Atlantic League of Professional Baseball (Atlantic League). However, the Atlantic League season was canceled in late June due to the COVID-19 pandemic. He later signed on to play for the Sugar Land Skeeters of the Constellation Energy League (a makeshift four-team independent league created as a result of the pandemic) for the 2020 season. He was subsequently named to the league's all-star team.

=== Gastonia Honey Hunters ===
On May 21, 2021, Scott signed with the Gastonia Honey Hunters of the Atlantic League. Scott recorded a 2–1 record and 1.62 ERA in 15 appearances with Gastonia.

=== Sultanes de Monterrey ===
On July 17, 2021, Scott signed with the Sultanes de Monterrey of the Mexican League. In 9 appearances for Monterrey, he recorded a 3.48 ERA with 8 strikeouts across 10 1/3 innings pitched. Scott was released by the Sultanes on January 24, 2022.

=== Wild Health Genomes ===
On April 21, 2022, Scott signed with the Wild Health Genomes of the Atlantic League. In 16 games (15 starts), he compiled a 5–7 record and 4.56 ERA with 56 strikeouts over 77 innings of work. Scott was released by the Genomes on August 7.

On August 22, 2022, Scott announced his retirement from professional baseball via Instagram.

== Scouting report ==
During his professional career, Scott threw from a three-quarter arm slot and commanded a 90 mph (140 km/h) fastball to both corners. His secondary offerings included an 11–5 curveball that worked 71–73 mph (114–117 km/h) with a long, two-plane break, and a 79–81 mph (127–130 km/h) straight changeup that showed late drop, which was also effective against right-handed hitters. He also offered a unique low three-quarter arm slot, used primarily against left-handed hitter alongside a sweeping slider from the same arm slot.

== Personal life ==
Scott is heavily involved in community service. With Pawtucket in 2016, he was the recipient of the Sullivan Tire Spirit Award, which is given to a player who devotes their free time to helping those in the community.

He is married to Chelsea Scott. They began dating in high school, and married in December 2017.

== Sources ==
Awards
Preceded by Jonathan Aro	Lou Gorman Award; 2016	Succeeded by Brian Johnson
