= Trevor Kelley =

American baseball player (born 1992)

- Pitcher
- Born: October 20, 1992 (age 34); Barrington, Rhode Island, U.S.
- Batted: Right Threw: Right

MLB debut
- July 2, 2019, for the Boston Red Sox

Last MLB appearance
- August 25, 2023, for the Tampa Bay Rays

MLB statistics
- Win–loss record: 1–4
- Earned run average: 6.75
- Strikeouts: 45
- Stats at Baseball Reference

Teams
- Boston Red Sox (2019); Philadelphia Phillies (2020); Milwaukee Brewers (2022); Tampa Bay Rays (2023)

Trevor Michael Kelley (born October 20, 1992) is an American former professional baseball pitcher. He played in Major League Baseball (MLB) for the Boston Red Sox, Philadelphia Phillies, Milwaukee Brewers, and Tampa Bay Rays. Listed at 6 feet 2 inches (1.88 m) and 210 pounds (95 kg), he threw and batted right-handed.

== Amateur career ==
Kelley attended Eugene Ashley High School in Wilmington, North Carolina. He attended the University of North Carolina and played college baseball for the Tar Heels in addition to pursuing a degree in exercise and sport science. During his freshman year of college, Kelley became a sidearm pitcher. In 2013, he played collegiate summer baseball with the Orleans Firebirds of the Cape Cod Baseball League. He was drafted by the Boston Red Sox in the 36th round of the 2015 MLB draft.

== Professional career ==
=== Boston Red Sox ===
In 2015, Kelley played for the rookie–level Gulf Coast League Red Sox and the Low–A Lowell Spinners, combining to go 1–3 with a 3.60 ERA in 25 innings. He split the 2016 season between the Single–A Greenville Drive and the High–A Salem Red Sox, going a combined 1–3 with a 1.83 ERA in 39 innings. He split 2017 between Salem and the Double-A Portland Sea Dogs, going a combined 2–1 with a 2.36 ERA over 60 1/3 innings. His 2018 season was split between Portland and the Triple-A Pawtucket Red Sox, going 2–3 with a 2.88 ERA in 56 innings.

Kelley opened the 2019 season back with Pawtucket, where through the end of June he had a 5–2 record in 28 games (all in relief) with a 0.96 ERA and 34 strikeouts in 37 2/3 innings. On July 1, the Red Sox announced that they would add Kelley to their active major league roster; he made his MLB debut on July 2, pitching the ninth inning in a 10–6 win over the Toronto Blue Jays. Kelley was optioned to Pawtucket on July 4. In late August, he was named to the International League post season all-star team. He was recalled to Boston on September 4, following the end of the Triple-A season. In mid-September, Kelley was named a Triple-A post season all-star by Baseball America, and was named the recipient of the Red Sox' Lou Gorman Award. Overall with the 2019 Red Sox, Kelley appeared in 10 games, compiling an 0–3 record with an 8.64 ERA and six strikeouts in 8 1/3 innings.

=== Philadelphia Phillies ===
On December 2, 2019, Kelley was claimed off waivers by the Philadelphia Phillies. He was designated for assignment following the acquisition of Reggie McClain on January 31, 2020. Kelley cleared waivers and was sent outright to the Triple-A Lehigh Valley IronPigs on February 5. Kelley made the Opening Day roster for the Phillies in 2020. In four appearances for the Phillies, he struggled to a 10.80 ERA with five strikeouts across 3 1/3 innings pitched. Kelley was designated for assignment again by the Phillies on August 11. He cleared waivers and was sent outright to Triple-A on August 15. Kelley elected free agency on September 28.

=== Chicago Cubs ===
On December 21, 2020, Kelley signed a minor league contract with the Chicago Cubs. On April 24, 2021, Kelley was released by the Cubs organization.

=== Atlanta Braves ===
On April 28, 2021, Kelley signed a minor league contract with the Atlanta Braves organization. Kelley spent the season with the Triple-A Gwinnett Stripers, making 37 appearances with a 1.52 ERA and 46 strikeouts. He elected free agency following the season on November 7.

=== Milwaukee Brewers ===
On November 18, 2021, Kelley signed a minor league deal with the Milwaukee Brewers, with an invite to spring training. He had his contract selected on May 17, 2022. On the year, Kelley made a career-high 18 appearances, logging a 6.08 ERA, striking out 23 in 23 2/3 innings of work, and collecting his first career win.

On January 4, 2023, Kelley was designated for assignment by the Brewers following the acquisition of Bryse Wilson. On January 11, Kelley cleared waivers and was assigned outright to the Triple-A Nashville Sounds. However, he rejected the outright assignment and elected free agency the same day.

=== Tampa Bay Rays ===
On January 18, 2023, Kelley signed a minor league contract with the Tampa Bay Rays organization. On February 16, Kelley was selected to the 40-man roster, but the move was voided the following day as, as a non-roster invitee, Kelley was ineligible for the 40-man until March 15. On March 15, the Rays officially selected Kelley to the 40-man roster, placing Andrew Kittredge on the 60-day injured list to clear roster space. He was optioned to the Triple-A Durham Bulls to begin the 2023 season.

On May 12, 2023, Kelley made his first major league start against the New York Yankees. In 10 games for Tampa Bay, he registered a 5.87 ERA with 11 strikeouts in 15 1/3 innings of work. On September 22, Kelley was designated for assignment following the promotion of Junior Caminero. He cleared waivers and was sent outright to Durham on September 24. Kelley elected free agency following the season on November 6.

=== Seattle Mariners ===
On February 23, 2024, Kelley signed a minor league contract with the Seattle Mariners organization. In 54 appearances for the Triple-A Tacoma Rainiers, he compiled a 3-2 record and 3.52 ERA with 62 strikeouts across 53 2/3 innings pitched. Kelley elected free agency following the season on November 4.

=== Leones de Yucatán ===
On March 19, 2025, Kelley signed with the Leones de Yucatán of the Mexican League. He made 54 appearances for Yucatán, compiling a 3-0 record and 4.47 ERA with 43 strikeouts and two saves across 50 1/3 innings pitched. On April 6, 2026, Kelley was released by the Leones.

=== Tigres de Quintana Roo ===
On April 14, 2026, Kelley signed with the Tigres de Quintana Roo of the Mexican League. In 53 games he threw 47.2 innings of relief going 3-3 with a 5.10 ERA with 38 strikeouts.

Kelley retired from professional baseball on August 5, 2026, after pitching in his final game for the Tigres.

Awards
Preceded by Ryan Brasier	Lou Gorman Award; 2019	Succeeded by Kutter Crawford
