= Tommy Hottovy =

American baseball player and coach (born 1981)

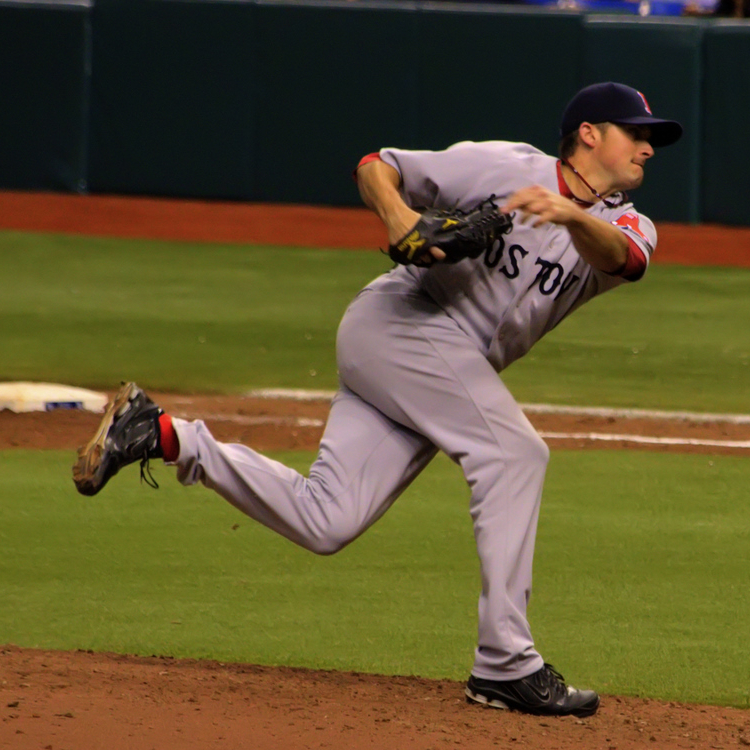
- Hottovy with the Boston Red Sox in 2011

Chicago Cubs – No. 68
- Pitcher / Pitching coach
- Born: July 9, 1981 (age 45); Kansas City, Missouri, U.S.
- Batted: Left Threw: Left

MLB debut
- June 3, 2011, for the Boston Red Sox

Last appearance
- October 1, 2012, for the Kansas City Royals

MLB statistics (through 2012 season)
- Win–loss record: 0–0
- Earned run average: 4.05
- Strikeouts: 8
- Stats at Baseball Reference

Teams
- As player: Boston Red Sox (2011); Kansas City Royals (2012); As coach: Chicago Cubs (2019–present)

Thomas Lee Hottovy (born July 9, 1981) is an American former professional baseball pitcher who is currently the pitching coach for the Chicago Cubs of Major League Baseball (MLB). He was drafted by the Boston Red Sox in the fourth round of the 2004 MLB draft, and pitched in MLB for the Red Sox and the Kansas City Royals. He played college baseball at Wichita State.

== Playing career ==
=== Boston Red Sox ===
Hottovy began his professional career as a starting pitcher with the Lowell Spinners in 2004. In 30 1/3 innings with Lowell, the left hander gave up three earned runs. The following season he was promoted to High-A Wilmington, where he had a 5.45 ERA and a 3–12 record in 23 starts. He split the 2006 season between Wilmington and the Portland Sea Dogs, with a 10–10 record and a 3.15 ERA between the two teams. He spent 2007 and 2008 with Portland, recording 5.61 and 5.00 ERAs in those seasons, respectively. In 2009, he became a full-time relief pitcher. He was sent back to Low-A Lowell for five games before returning to Portland. As a reliever from 2009 to 2011 with Lowell, Portland, and the Triple-A Pawtucket Red Sox, he appeared in 76 games, giving up 63 runs in 136 1/3 innings.

Hottovy was called up to the major leagues for the first time on June 3, 2011. He got the Red Sox out of jams in his first two MLB outings, inducing a ground-out and a double play, both to end innings. In total, he made eight appearances for Boston, allowing three earned runs in four innings of work before being designated for assignment on July 16. He was then sent outright to Pawtucket on July 20. In September, Hottovy was named the inaugural recipient of the Red Sox' Lou Gorman Award.

=== Kansas City Royals ===
Hottovy became a free agent on November 2, 2011, and signed with the Kansas City Royals on November 15. Hottovy split his time between the Royals and Triple-A Omaha. In 9 games with the Royals, Hottovy had a 2.89 ERA with 6 strikeouts in 9 1/3 innings. With Omaha, he had 7 saves in 41 games and a 2.52 ERA while striking out 61 in 50 innings. On November 2, 2012, the Royals designated Hottovy for assignment.

=== Toronto Blue Jays ===
On November 8, 2012, Hottovy was acquired by the Texas Rangers for a player to be named later or cash considerations. On January 7, 2013, Hottovy was designated for assignment to make room for Lance Berkman on the roster.

Hottovy was claimed off waivers by the Toronto Blue Jays on January 10, 2013. The Blue Jays designated Hottovy for assignment on January 11, 2013, to make room for Henry Blanco on their roster. Hottovy was outrighted to the Buffalo Bisons on January 16. Hottovy started the 2013 season with the Double-A New Hampshire Fisher Cats, and was promoted to the Buffalo Bisons on June 4. He became a free agent on October 1.

The Chicago Cubs signed Hottovy to a minor league contract with an invitation to major league spring training on December 12, 2013. He was released on April 27, 2014, without appearing for the organization.

== Post-playing career ==
Hottovy was hired by the Chicago Cubs to serve as the team's Run Prevention Coordinator in December 2014. He served in that position until he was named the Cubs' pitching coach on December 6, 2018. He remained pitching coach after the Cubs chose not to have Joe Maddon return and after the hiring of David Ross as Cubs' manager in 2019.

Hottovy contracted COVID-19 in 2020 and was isolated for 30 days; he recovered and returned for the abridged 2020 season.

Awards
Preceded by Award established	Lou Gorman Award; 2011	Succeeded by Daniel Nava
Sporting positions
Preceded by Jim Hickey	Chicago Cubs pitching coach 2019–present	Succeeded by Incumbent
