= Brian Johnson (pitcher) =

American baseball player (born 1990)

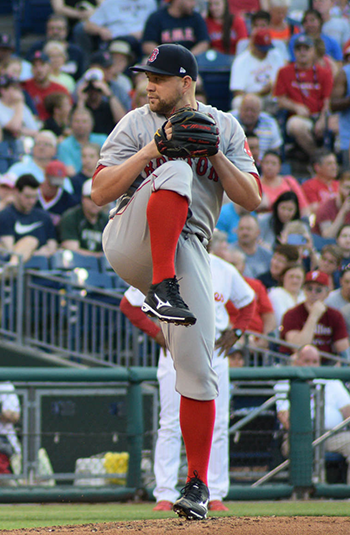
- Johnson with the Boston Red Sox
- Pitcher
- Born: December 7, 1990 (age 35); Lakeland, Florida, U.S.
- Batted: Left Threw: Left

MLB debut
- July 21, 2015, for the Boston Red Sox

Last MLB appearance
- September 26, 2019, for the Boston Red Sox

MLB statistics
- Win–loss record: 7–9
- Earned run average: 4.74
- Strikeouts: 142
- Stats at Baseball Reference

Teams
- Boston Red Sox (2015, 2017–2019)

Christopher Brian Johnson (born December 7, 1990) is an American former professional baseball pitcher who played in Major League Baseball (MLB) for the Boston Red Sox. Listed at 6 feet 4 inches (1.93 m) and 235 pounds (107 kg), he both throws and bats left-handed. Johnson was the 2012 recipient of the John Olerud Award.

== High school ==
Johnson graduated from Cocoa Beach High School in Cocoa Beach, Florida, in 2009, where he was a five-year letterman for the Minutemen. He was coached during his high school baseball career by Matt Kellam and Rich Coleman. Johnson was named the Florida Today Baseball Player of the Year as well as First-Team All-State in Florida in both 2008 and 2009. He finished with 352 strikeouts in 252 2/3 career innings and a career batting average of .481 with 98 runs, 40 doubles, 21 home runs and 95 RBI. Johnson also fired a 17-strikeout no-hitter against Space Coast High School in his senior year. Johnson was ranked the No. 84 player in the United States by Baseball America in 2009. He was drafted by the Los Angeles Dodgers in the 27th round of the 2009 MLB draft but did not sign, choosing to play college baseball at the University of Florida instead. He pursued a degree in anthropology.

== Collegiate career ==
Johnson was part of the No. 1 recruiting class by Baseball America at Florida and was named a freshman All-American by Baseball America, Yahoo! Sports, National Collegiate Baseball Writers Association, and Louisville Slugger in 2010.

Johnson served as the No. 2/3 starting pitcher for the Florida Gators baseball team in 2010. Johnson's pitching repertoire featured a low 90's fastball, changeup, and curveball. He helped lead the Gators to their first College World Series (CWS) appearance since 2005. The Gators were ranked as high as No. 2 in the country by Baseball America. Johnson was also named to the John Olerud Award watch-list. The award, given to the top two-way player in America, was won by Mike McGee of Florida State University. The Gators were eliminated by Florida State 8–5 in the CWS and finished with a regular season record of 47–17.

Johnson finished the season with a .405 batting average, five doubles, four home runs and 21 RBIs. As a pitcher, he finished with a 6–4 record in 14 starts, recording 14 walks, 51 strikeouts, and a 4.03 ERA in 73 2/3 innings.

In 2011, he played collegiate summer baseball in the Cape Cod Baseball League for the Yarmouth-Dennis Red Sox. In 2012, Johnson won the John Olerud Award as the best two-way player in college baseball.

=== Collegiate awards and honors ===
- 2012 – SEC Player of the Week (4/9/12–4/16/12)
- 2011 – Semifinalist for the Dick Howser Trophy
- 2011 – Semifinalist for the John Olerud Two-Way Player of the Year Award
- 2011 – Southeastern Conference Academic Honor Roll
- 2011 – First Team Southeastern Conference Designated-Hitter selection
- 2011 – College World Series Participant
- 2010 – First-Team Southeastern Conference All-Freshmen Team (as pitcher and designated hitter)
- 2010 – First-Team Baseball America Freshmen All-American
- 2010 – First-Team Yahoo! Sports Freshman All-American
- 2010 – Second-Team National Collegiate Baseball Writers Association Freshman All-American
- 2010 – Louisville Slugger Freshman All-American
- 2010 – Southeastern Conference Academic Honor Roll
- 2010 – Member of the Baseball America No. 1 recruiting class
- 2010 – College World Series participant
- 2010 – MVP of the Gainesville Regional
- 2010 – Two-Time SEC Freshmen of the Week
- 2010 – Member of the Collegiate National Team

== Professional career ==
=== Boston Red Sox ===
==== Minor leagues ====
The Boston Red Sox selected Johnson in the first round, with the 31st pick, of the 2012 MLB draft. He signed with the Red Sox on June 27, and received a signing bonus of $1,575,000.

Johnson made his professional debut with the Lowell Spinners of the Low–A New York–Penn League after signing. Due to his heavy workload with Florida, the Red Sox limited Johnson's appearances for the rest of the season. He appeared in four games for Lowell, and had his season end prematurely when a line drive broke the orbital bones in his face during the annual Futures at Fenway event. In 2013, Johnson began the season with the Greenville Drive of the Single–A South Atlantic League and was promoted to the Salem Red Sox of the High–A Carolina League in August. The Red Sox assigned Johnson to Salem at the beginning of the 2014 season. After making five starts for Salem, he was promoted to the Portland Sea Dogs of the Double–A Eastern League in May. The Red Sox named Johnson their Minor League Pitcher of the Year at the end of the 2014 season, after going 13–3 with 132 strikeouts and a 2.13 ERA.

==== Major leagues ====
Johnson opened the 2015 season with the Triple-A Pawtucket Red Sox of the International League. During the midseason, Johnson was included in the International League roster for the Triple-A All-Star Game. Following an injury to Clay Buchholz, Johnson made his major league debut with the Red Sox on July 21, taking the loss in a 7–3 defeat to the Houston Astros. He gave up four earned runs, four walks, and three strikeouts while pitching 4 1/3 innings. It was his only MLB appearance of the season.

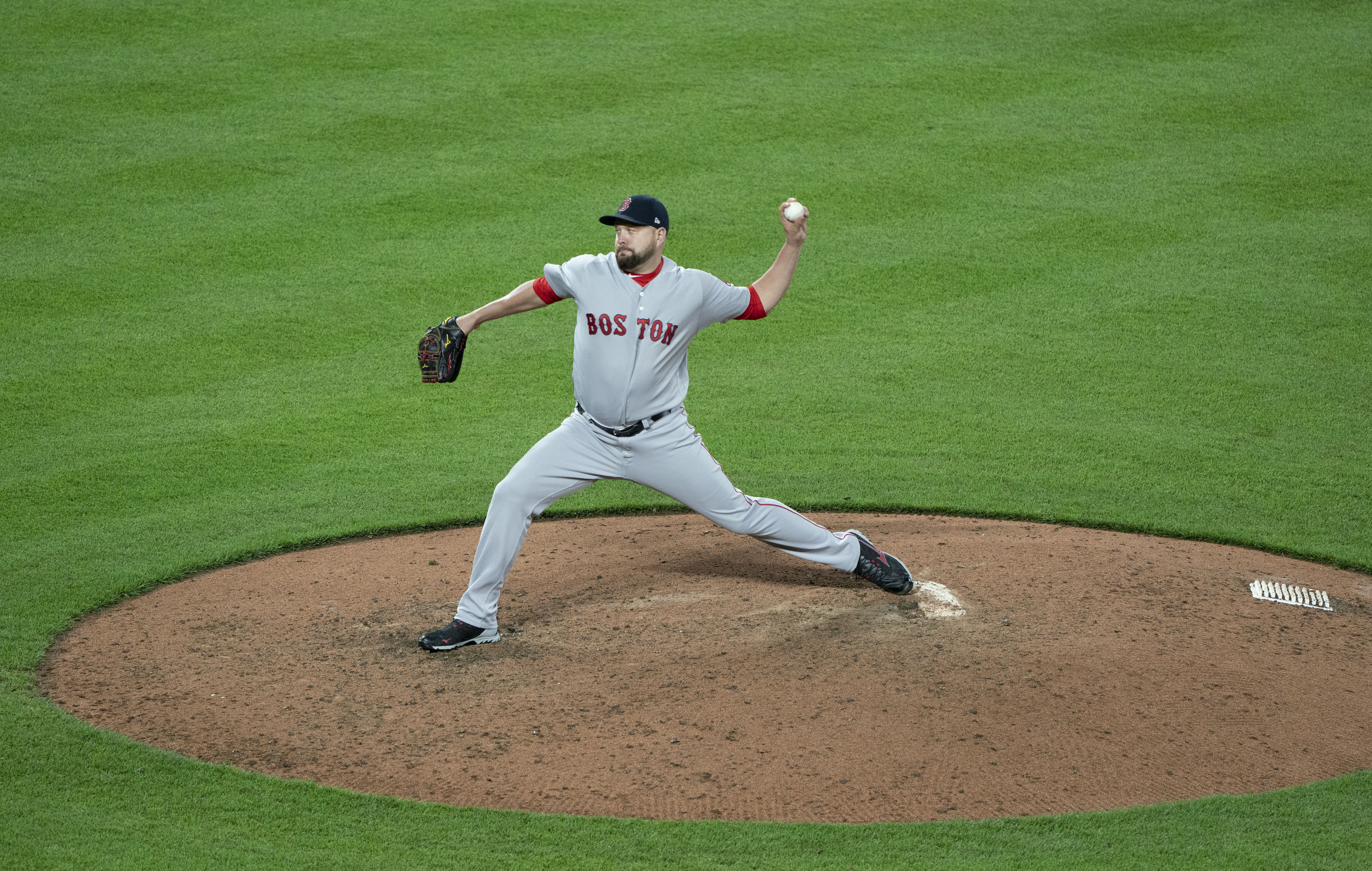
Johnson with the Red Sox in June 2018

Johnson spent the 2016 season in the minor leagues, battling injury and an anxiety issue. He made 19 minor league appearances (all starts), including 15 with Pawtucket, compiling a 5–7 record with 3.60 ERA in 95 innings pitched.

During 2017, Johnson pitched mostly with Pawtucket, while also making five appearances (all starts) with Boston. On May 27, Johnson threw the first shutout of the Red Sox season in a complete game against the Seattle Mariners. With the 2017 Red Sox, Johnson pitched 27 innings with a 2–0 record and a 4.33 ERA. He was also the recipient of the Red Sox' Lou Gorman Award.

In 2018, Johnson had a 1.72 ERA in 15 2/3 innings pitched during spring training and new manager Alex Cora named him to start the fifth game of the season, which Johnson won on April 2 against the Miami Marlins. He was then moved into a bullpen role. Through mid-June, Johnson had 20 appearances (one start) with a 1–2 record and a 4.73 ERA in 32 1/3 innings pitched. After starter Steven Wright was placed on the disabled list on June 26, Cora named Johnson to start on June 28 against the Los Angeles Angels. In that start, Johnson pitched four innings, allowing one run on three hits and took a no decision. Following another start on July 3—also a no decision—Johnson was placed on the disabled list due to a left hip inflammation; he was activated on July 15. Overall for the 2018 Red Sox, Johnson made 38 appearances (13 starts), pitching 99 1/3 innings with a 4–5 record and a 4.17 ERA. He was not included on Boston's postseason roster.

Johnson was on Boston's Opening Day roster to start the 2019 season. He was placed on the injured list on April 6, due to left elbow inflammation. Johnson had rehabilitation assignments beginning on May 15 with Triple-A Pawtucket, May 21 with the Double-A Portland Sea Dogs, and June 3 again with Pawtucket. He was activated to Boston's roster on June 14, but returned to the injured list late in the month with a "non-baseball related medical matter". He was sent on a rehabilitation assignment with Pawtucket on July 21, and activated on August 3. Overall for the season with Boston, Johnson made 21 appearances (7 starts), striking out 31 in 40 1/3 inning with a 6.02 ERA and 1–3 record. Johnson was outrighted to AAA on November 27, 2019.

On August 10, 2020, Johnson was released by the Red Sox organization.

=== Milwaukee Milkmen ===
On May 31, 2021, Johnson signed with the Milwaukee Milkmen of the American Association of Professional Baseball, an independent baseball league. In two appearances for Milwaukee, Johnson logged five scoreless innings with eight strikeouts.

=== Los Angeles Angels ===
On June 22, 2021, Johnson's contract was purchased by the Los Angeles Angels organization. In 14 games (10 starts) for the Triple–A Salt Lake Bees, he tallied a 3–4 record and 5.72 ERA with 47 strikeouts across 61 1/3 innings pitched. Johnson elected free agency following the season on November 7.

== International career ==
Johnson played for the United States Collegiate National Team in the summer of 2010. He was one of only two freshmen on the squad, the other being Gator teammate Nolan Fontana. Johnson finished second in appearances for the summer season with seven and he finished with the third-best ERA (0.63). Johnson, the youngest player on the 23-man roster, finished with a 1–0 record, one save, 16 strikeouts, five walks and one earned run allowed in 14 1/3 innings pitched. Johnson helped lead the team to a second-place finish in the 2010 International University Sports Federation World Baseball Championships. They fell to Cuba 4–3 in the championship game in Tokyo, Japan, on August 7, 2010.

On October 29, 2018, Johnson was selected to play in the 2018 MLB Japan All-Star Series.

== Personal life ==
Johnson's sister, Brooke, was a four-year letterman (2006–2009) for the Florida Gators softball team. Johnson's older brother, Billy Jr., played four years of college baseball, finishing his career with Flagler College. Brian's father, Billy Johnson, played college football for Florida State University in the 1970s. Brian's uncle, Joe Williams, was the college basketball head coach for Florida State University, Furman University, and Jacksonville University.

Awards
Preceded by Robby Scott	Lou Gorman Award; 2017	Succeeded by Ryan Brasier
