= List of Silver Slugger Award winners at shortstop =

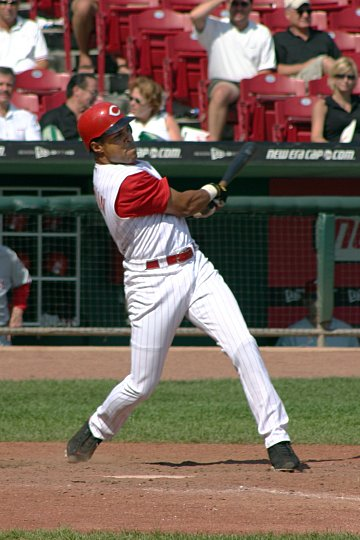
Barry Larkin is the Silver Slugger Award leader among shortstops, with nine wins.

The Silver Slugger Award is awarded annually to the best offensive player at each position in both the American League (AL) and the National League (NL), as determined by the coaches and managers of Major League Baseball (MLB). These voters consider several offensive categories in selecting the winners, including batting average, slugging percentage, and on-base percentage, in addition to "coaches' and managers' general impressions of a player's overall offensive value." Managers and coaches are not permitted to vote for players on their own team. The Silver Slugger was first awarded in 1980 and is given by Hillerich & Bradsby, the manufacturer of Louisville Slugger bats. The award is a bat-shaped trophy, 3 feet (91 cm) tall, engraved with the names of each of the winners from the league and plated with sterling silver.

Among shortstops, Barry Larkin is the leader in Silver Slugger Awards, with nine wins between 1988 and 1999, including five consecutive awards (1988–1992). Larkin is fourth all-time in Silver Slugger wins among all positions, behind outfielder Barry Bonds, catcher Mike Piazza and third baseman Alex Rodriguez, who won his first seven awards at shortstop before a position change. Hall of Famer Cal Ripken Jr. won eight Silver Sluggers as a shortstop from 1983 to 1993. Derek Jeter (2006–2009; 2012) and Xander Bogaerts (2015–2016; 2019; 2021–2022) each won five Silver Sluggers as a shortstop. Francisco Lindor collected four Silver Sluggers as a shortstop, winning two each in the American and National Leagues (2017–2018; 2023–2024) Ian Desmond (2012–2014), Alan Trammell (1987–1988, 1990), Édgar Rentería (2000; 2002–2003), Corey Seager (2016–2017; 2023) and Bobby Witt Jr. (2024–2026) each won three Silver Slugger Awards at shortstop, with Seager winning at least one Silver Slugger across both the American and National Leagues.

Rodriguez's offensive statistics in his seven Silver Slugger-winning seasons lead American League and major league shortstops in most categories; his batting average of .358 and .631 slugging percentage in 1996, .420 on-base percentage in 2000 and 57 home runs in 2002 are records among winning shortstops. The lone category in which Rodriguez does not lead the American League is runs batted in (RBI), where Miguel Tejada is the leader; he batted in 150 runs in 2004. The RBI leader in the National League is Trevor Story, who batted in 108 runs in 2018. In contrast, Rodriguez collected RBI totals over 110 (ranging from 111 in 1999 to 142 in 2002) in all of his Silver Slugger-winning seasons, highlighting the difference in power and production between American League and National League shortstops. Other National League leaders include Larkin and Hanley Ramírez, who led in batting average (Larkin and Ramírez batted .342 in 1989 and 2009 respectively) and on-base percentage (Larkin and Ramírez with .410 in 1996 and 2009 respectively). Fernando Tatís Jr. led National League-winning shortstops in home runs and slugging percentage, hitting 42 home runs and had a .611 slugging percentage in 2021. Though he has never played in the National League, Rodriguez's 40 or more home runs in six of his seven winning seasons at shortstop are greater than any total hit by a National League winner at third base.

== Key ==
Year	Links to the corresponding Major League Baseball season
AVG	Batting average
OBP	On-base percentage
SLG	Slugging percentage
HR	Home runs
RBI	Runs batted in
Ref	References
*	Winner of the most Silver Sluggers in Major League Baseball as a shortstop
†	Member of the National Baseball Hall of Fame and Museum

== American League winners ==
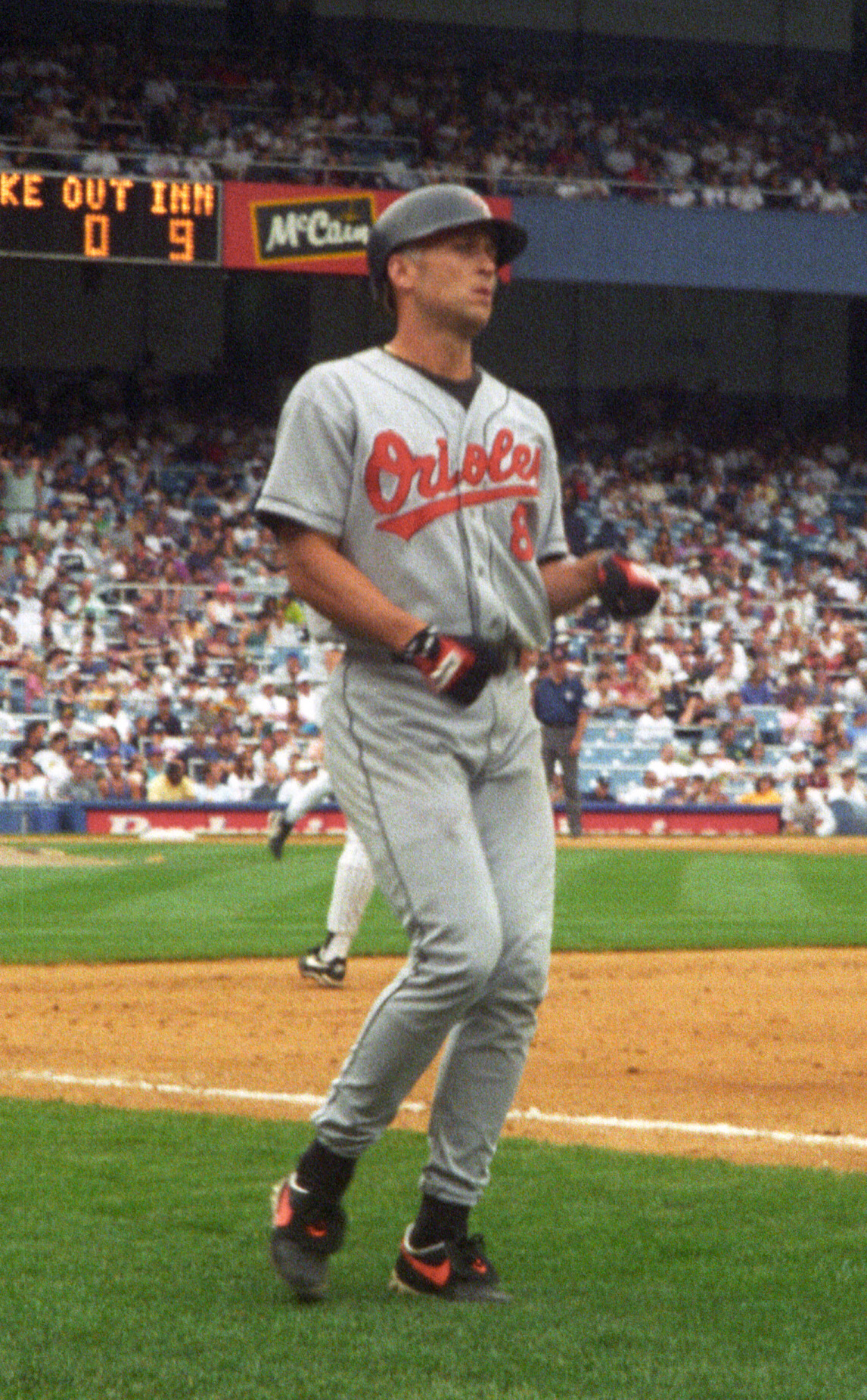
Cal Ripken Jr. has the most AL Silver Slugger Awards at shortstop and second-most in either league.

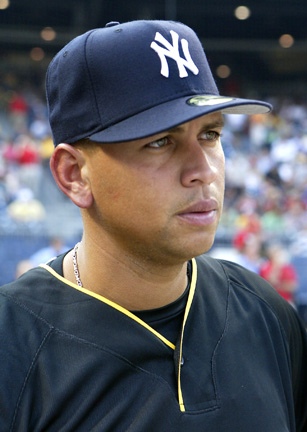
Alex Rodriguez won the AL Silver Slugger Award at shortstop in six consecutive seasons (1998–2003), more than any other player.

Year	Player	Team	AVG	OBP	SLG	HR	RBI	Ref
1980	Robin Yount^{†}	Milwaukee Brewers	.293	.321	.519	23	87	
1981	Rick Burleson	California Angels	.293	.357	.372	5	33	
1982	Robin Yount^{†} (2)	Milwaukee Brewers	.331	.379	.578	29	114	
1983	Cal Ripken Jr.^{†}	Baltimore Orioles	.318	.371	.517	27	102	
1984	Cal Ripken Jr.^{†} (2)	Baltimore Orioles	.304	.374	.510	27	86	
1985	Cal Ripken Jr.^{†} (3)	Baltimore Orioles	.282	.347	.469	26	110	
1986	Cal Ripken Jr.^{†} (4)	Baltimore Orioles	.282	.355	.461	25	81	
1987	Alan Trammell^{†}	Detroit Tigers	.343	.402	.551	28	105	
1988	Alan Trammell^{†} (2)	Detroit Tigers	.311	.373	.464	15	69	
1989	Cal Ripken Jr.^{†} (5)	Baltimore Orioles	.257	.317	.401	21	93	
1990	Alan Trammell^{†} (3)	Detroit Tigers	.304	.377	.449	14	89	
1991	Cal Ripken Jr.^{†} (6)	Baltimore Orioles	.323	.374	.566	34	114	
1992	Travis Fryman	Detroit Tigers	.266	.316	.416	20	96	
1993	Cal Ripken Jr.^{†} (7)	Baltimore Orioles	.257	.329	.420	24	90	
1994	Cal Ripken Jr.^{†} (8)	Baltimore Orioles	.315	.364	.459	13	75	
1995	John Valentin	Boston Red Sox	.298	.399	.533	27	102	
1996	Alex Rodriguez	Seattle Mariners	.358	.414	.631	36	123	
1997	Nomar Garciaparra	Boston Red Sox	.306	.342	.534	30	98	
1998	Alex Rodriguez (2)	Seattle Mariners	.310	.360	.560	42	124	
1999	Alex Rodriguez (3)	Seattle Mariners	.285	.357	.586	42	111	
2000	Alex Rodriguez (4)	Seattle Mariners	.316	.420	.606	41	132	
2001	Alex Rodriguez (5)	Texas Rangers	.318	.399	.622	52	135	
2002	Alex Rodriguez (6)	Texas Rangers	.300	.392	.623	57	142	
2003	Alex Rodriguez (7)	Texas Rangers	.298	.396	.600	47	118	
2004	Miguel Tejada	Baltimore Orioles	.311	.360	.534	34	150	
2005	Miguel Tejada (2)	Baltimore Orioles	.304	.349	.515	26	98	
2006	Derek Jeter^{†}	New York Yankees	.343	.417	.483	14	97	
2007	Derek Jeter^{†} (2)	New York Yankees	.322	.388	.452	12	73	
2008	Derek Jeter^{†} (3)	New York Yankees	.300	.363	.408	11	69	
2009	Derek Jeter^{†} (4)	New York Yankees	.334	.406	.465	18	66	
2010	Alexei Ramírez	Chicago White Sox	.282	.313	.431	18	70	
2011	Asdrúbal Cabrera	Cleveland Indians	.273	.332	.460	25	92	
2012	Derek Jeter^{†} (5)	New York Yankees	.316	.362	.429	15	58	
2013	J. J. Hardy	Baltimore Orioles	.263	.306	.433	25	76	
2014	Alexei Ramírez (2)	Chicago White Sox	.273	.305	.408	15	74	
2015	Xander Bogaerts	Boston Red Sox	.320	.355	.421	7	81	
2016	Xander Bogaerts (2)	Boston Red Sox	.294	.356	.446	21	89	
2017	Francisco Lindor	Cleveland Indians	.273	.337	.505	33	89	
2018	Francisco Lindor (2)	Cleveland Indians	.277	.352	.519	38	92	
2019	Xander Bogaerts (3)	Boston Red Sox	.309	.384	.555	33	117	
2020	Tim Anderson	Chicago White Sox	.322	.357	.539	10	21	
2021	Xander Bogaerts (4)	Boston Red Sox	.295	.370	.493	23	79	
2022	Xander Bogaerts (5)	Boston Red Sox	.307	.377	.456	15	73	
2023	Corey Seager (3)	Texas Rangers	.327	.390	.623	33	96	
2024	Bobby Witt Jr.	Kansas City Royals	.332	.389	.588	32	109	
2025	Bobby Witt Jr. (2)	Kansas City Royals	.295	.351	.501	23	88	
2026	Bobby Witt Jr. (3)	Kansas City Royals	.281	.359	.441	18	54	

== National League winners ==
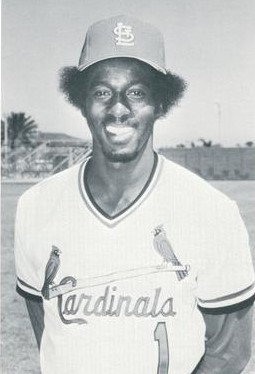
Garry Templeton went five seasons between Silver Slugger Awards at shortstop (1980–1985), the longest such gap.

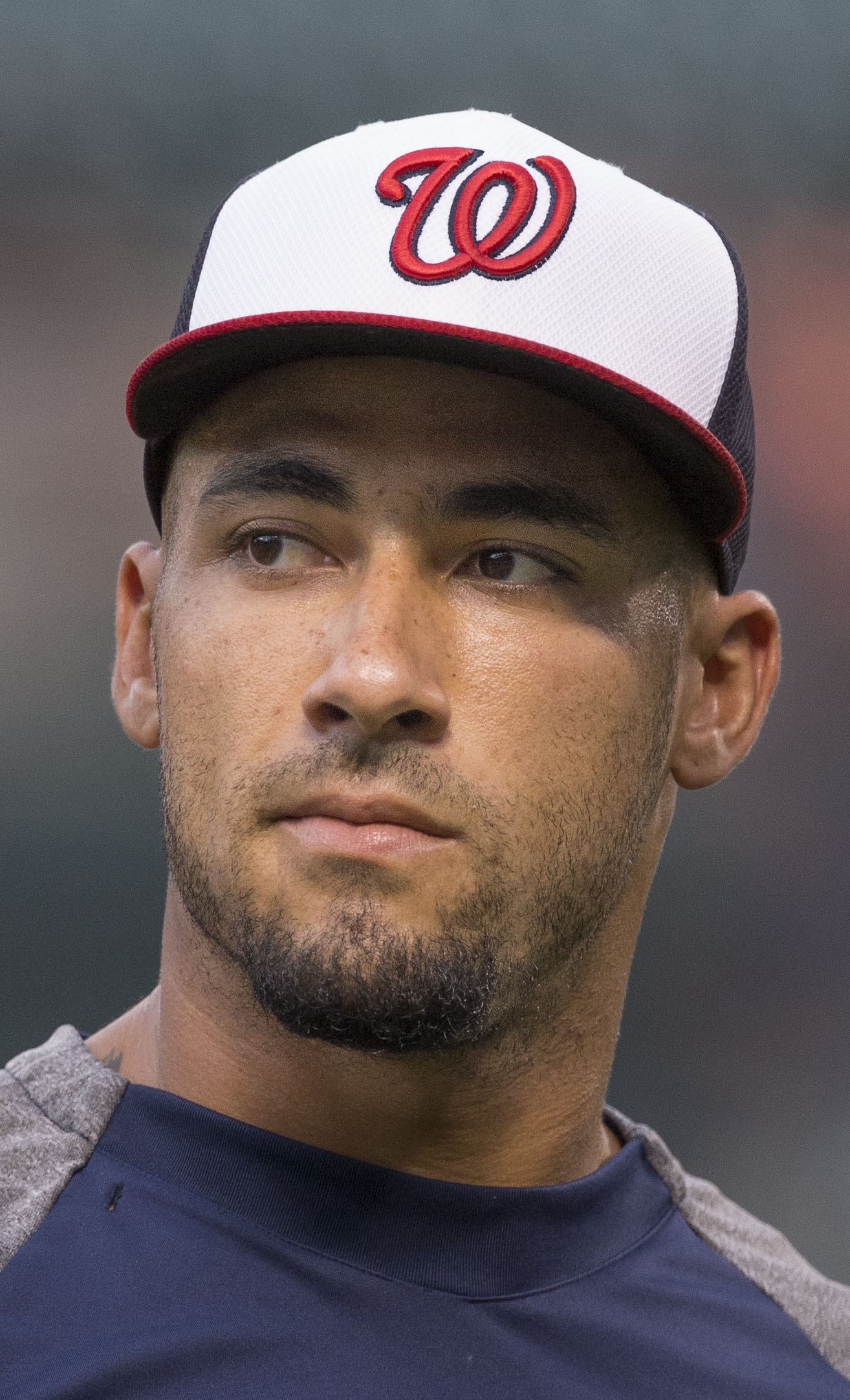
Ian Desmond is the only player other than Barry Larkin to win the NL Silver Slugger Award at shortstop in three consecutive seasons (2012–2014).

Year	Player	Team	AVG	OBP	SLG	HR	RBI	Ref
1980	Garry Templeton	St. Louis Cardinals	.319	.342	.417	4	43	
1981	Dave Concepción	Cincinnati Reds	.306	.358	.409	5	67	
1982	Dave Concepción (2)	Cincinnati Reds	.287	.337	.371	5	53	
1983	Dickie Thon	Houston Astros	.286	.341	.457	20	79	
1984	Garry Templeton (2)	San Diego Padres	.258	.312	.320	2	35	
1985	Hubie Brooks	Montreal Expos	.269	.310	.413	13	100	
1986	Hubie Brooks (2)	Montreal Expos	.340	.388	.569	14	58	
1987	Ozzie Smith^{†}	St. Louis Cardinals	.303	.392	.383	0	75	
1988	Barry Larkin*^{†}	Cincinnati Reds	.296	.347	.429	12	56	
1989	Barry Larkin*^{†} (2)	Cincinnati Reds	.342	.375	.446	4	36	
1990	Barry Larkin*^{†} (3)	Cincinnati Reds	.301	.358	.396	7	67	
1991	Barry Larkin*^{†} (4)	Cincinnati Reds	.302	.378	.506	20	69	
1992	Barry Larkin*^{†} (5)	Cincinnati Reds	.304	.377	.454	12	78	
1993	Jay Bell	Pittsburgh Pirates	.310	.392	.437	9	51	
1994	Wil Cordero	Montreal Expos	.294	.363	.489	15	63	
1995	Barry Larkin*^{†} (6)	Cincinnati Reds	.319	.394	.492	15	66	
1996	Barry Larkin*^{†} (7)	Cincinnati Reds	.298	.410	.567	33	89	
1997	Jeff Blauser	Atlanta Braves	.308	.405	.482	17	70	
1998	Barry Larkin*^{†} (8)	Cincinnati Reds	.309	.397	.504	17	72	
1999	Barry Larkin*^{†} (9)	Cincinnati Reds	.293	.390	.420	12	75	
2000	Edgar Rentería	St. Louis Cardinals	.278	.346	.423	16	76	
2001	Rich Aurilia	San Francisco Giants	.324	.369	.572	37	97	
2002	Edgar Rentería (2)	St. Louis Cardinals	.305	.364	.439	11	83	
2003	Edgar Rentería (3)	St. Louis Cardinals	.330	.394	.480	13	100	
2004	Jack Wilson	Pittsburgh Pirates	.308	.335	.459	11	59	
2005	Felipe López	Cincinnati Reds	.291	.352	.486	23	85	
2006	José Reyes	New York Mets	.300	.354	.487	19	81	
2007	Jimmy Rollins	Philadelphia Phillies	.296	.344	.531	30	94	
2008	Hanley Ramírez	Florida Marlins	.301	.400	.540	33	67	
2009	Hanley Ramírez (2)	Florida Marlins	.342	.410	.543	24	106	
2010	Troy Tulowitzki	Colorado Rockies	.315	.381	.568	27	95	
2011	Troy Tulowitzki (2)	Colorado Rockies	.302	.372	.544	30	105	
2012	Ian Desmond	Washington Nationals	.292	.335	.511	25	73	
2013	Ian Desmond (2)	Washington Nationals	.280	.331	.453	20	80	
2014	Ian Desmond (3)	Washington Nationals	.255	.313	.430	24	91	
2015	Brandon Crawford	San Francisco Giants	.256	.321	.462	21	84	
2016	Corey Seager	Los Angeles Dodgers	.308	.365	.512	26	72	
2017	Corey Seager (2)	Los Angeles Dodgers	.295	.375	.479	22	77	
2018	Trevor Story	Colorado Rockies	.291	.348	.567	37	108	
2019	Trevor Story (2)	Colorado Rockies	.294	.363	.554	35	85	
2020	Fernando Tatís Jr.	San Diego Padres	.277	.366	.571	17	45	
2021	Fernando Tatís Jr. (2)	San Diego Padres	.282	.364	.611	42	97	
2022	Trea Turner	Los Angeles Dodgers	.298	.343	.466	21	100	
2023	Francisco Lindor (3)	New York Mets	.254	.336	.470	31	98	
2024	Francisco Lindor (4)	New York Mets	.273	.344	.500	33	91	
2025	Geraldo Perdomo	Arizona Diamondbacks	.290	.389	.462	20	100	
2026	Elly De La Cruz	Cincinnati Reds	.283	.365	.515	30	79	
