= 2012 American League Wild Card Game =

Inaugural edition of Major League Baseball's American League Wild Card Game

| | 1 | 2 | 3 | 4 | 5 | 6 | 7 | 8 | 9 | R | H | E |
|---|---|---|---|---|---|---|---|---|---|---|---|---|
| Baltimore Orioles | 1 | 0 | 0 | 0 | 0 | 1 | 1 | 0 | 2 | 5 | 8 | 2 |
| Texas Rangers | 1 | 0 | 0 | 0 | 0 | 0 | 0 | 0 | 0 | 1 | 9 | 2 |
- Date: October 5, 2012, 8:37 p.m. (EDT)
- Venue: Rangers Ballpark in Arlington
- City: Arlington, Texas
- Managers: Buck Showalter (Baltimore Orioles); Ron Washington (Texas Rangers)
- Umpires: Gary Darling (crew chief), Jerry Layne, Ted Barrett, Bill Miller, Greg Gibson, Chris Guccione
- Attendance: 46,931
- Television: TBS
- TV announcers: Ernie Johnson Jr., John Smoltz, and Cal Ripken Jr.
- Radio: ESPN
- Radio announcers: Dan Shulman and Orel Hershiser

The 2012 American League Wild Card Game was a play-in game during Major League Baseball's (MLB) 2012 postseason played between the American League's (AL) two wild-card teams, the Texas Rangers and the Baltimore Orioles. It was held at Rangers Ballpark in Arlington, Texas, on October 5, 2012, at 8:37 p.m. EDT. The Orioles won by a 5–1 score and advanced to play the New York Yankees in the AL Division Series. The game was televised on TBS.

== Game results ==
=== Line score ===
October 5, 2012 7:38 pm (CDT) at Rangers Ballpark in Arlington, Texas, 75 °F (24 °C), partly cloudy
| Team | 1 | 2 | 3 | 4 | 5 | 6 | 7 | 8 | 9 | R | H | E |
|---|---|---|---|---|---|---|---|---|---|---|---|---|
| Baltimore | 1 | 0 | 0 | 0 | 0 | 1 | 1 | 0 | 2 | 5 | 8 | 2 |
| Texas | 1 | 0 | 0 | 0 | 0 | 0 | 0 | 0 | 0 | 1 | 9 | 2 |
WP: Joe Saunders (1–0) LP: Yu Darvish (0–1); Attendance: 46,931; Boxscore

The Orioles scored their first run of the inaugural AL wild-card game when J. J. Hardy knocked in Nate McLouth, who reached second on first baseman Michael Young's error, with his RBI single. The Rangers answered in the same frame when Ian Kinsler scored on a double play grounder by Josh Hamilton with runners on first and third. After the first inning, both starters, Joe Saunders and Yu Darvish, pitched shutout baseball until the sixth inning when Adam Jones knocked in a run via a sacrifice fly after back-to-back singles by Hardy and Chris Davis. Darvish was charged with another run in the seventh via a Nate McLouth RBI single after a leadoff single by Ryan Flaherty and sacrifice bunt by Manny Machado. The Oriole relievers would prove enough to take care of the Rangers lineup the rest of the way. The Orioles scored two insurance runs off of Joe Nathan in the final frame on a leadoff double by Robert Andino, RBI single by Machado, and a sacrifice fly by McLouth to extend their lead to 5–1. In the end, Jim Johnson finished the Rangers off in the 9th despite them giving Baltimore a scare on having the bases loaded and two down. Johnson got David Murphy to fly out to McLouth, preserving the victory. It was the first time Baltimore won a playoff series since the 1997 American League Division Series.
