= Ryan Flaherty =

American baseball player & coach (born 1986)

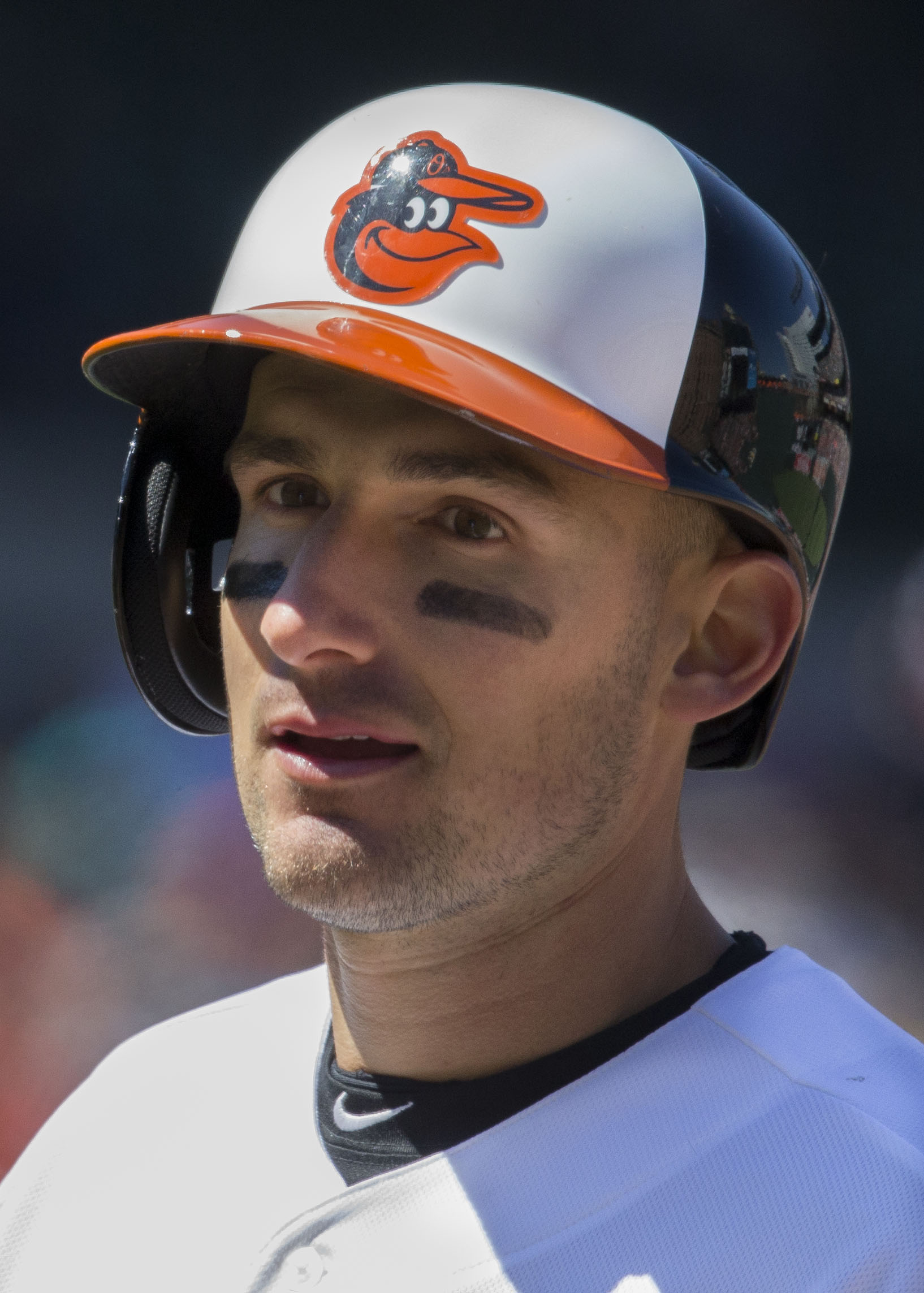
- Flaherty with the Orioles in 2014

Chicago Cubs – No. 84
- Infielder / Coach
- Born: July 27, 1986 (age 40); Portland, Maine, U.S.
- Batted: Left Threw: Right

MLB debut
- April 7, 2012, for the Baltimore Orioles

Last MLB appearance
- September 29, 2019, for the Cleveland Indians

MLB statistics
- Batting average: .215
- Home runs: 37
- Runs batted in: 142
- Stats at Baseball Reference

Teams
- As player: Baltimore Orioles (2012–2017); Atlanta Braves (2018); Cleveland Indians (2019); As coach: San Diego Padres (2020–2023); Chicago Cubs (2024–present)
Medals
Men's baseball
Representing United States
Pan American Games
Silver medal – second place	2007 Rio de Janeiro	Team

Ryan Edward Flaherty (born July 27, 1986) is an American professional baseball coach and former infielder. He is the current bench coach for the Chicago Cubs of Major League Baseball (MLB). He played in MLB for the Baltimore Orioles, Atlanta Braves, and the Cleveland Indians. Flaherty was a utility player, having played every position except for center field and catcher. Flaherty was the bench coach for the San Diego Padres from 2020 to 2023. Flaherty's nickname is Flash.

== Early life ==
He is the son of Edward and Deborah Flaherty. Edward was a star at the University of Maine and is now the head coach at the University of Southern Maine, a division III school in Gorham, Maine. He has been there for 32 years and the field at USM is named for him. As a kid, Ryan would accompany his father to Southern Maine practices, and field grounders. His younger brother, Regan was a draft pick of the Seattle Mariners. Flaherty graduated from Deering High School in 2005. In 2004, he led Nova Seafood to the American Legion World Series Championship, as well as winning the Telegram League batting title. He was a 2005 American Baseball Coaches Association Preseason All-American, also winning Maine's Mr. Baseball award in honor of John Winkin. He was also named Maine Gatorade High School Player of the Year as a senior at Deering High School. Flaherty lettered in baseball, basketball, captained the football team and was a finalist for the Fitzpatrick Trophy, which is given to Maine's best football player.

== College career ==
Ranked the 141st-best professional prospect by Baseball America, he chose to attend Vanderbilt University, where he played college baseball for the Commodores in the Southeastern Conference (SEC) of the National Collegiate Athletic Association's Division I alongside fellow future Major League players David Price and Pedro Alvarez; the latter became a teammate on the Baltimore Orioles in 2016.

As a freshman, Flaherty was named an honorable mention Freshman All-American. In sixty-two games, Flaherty had a .339 batting average with 49 RBI, 19 doubles, two homers and an on-base percentage of .421, leading the team with 22 multi-hit and 15 multi-RBI games. In 2006, he played collegiate summer baseball with the Hyannis Mets of the Cape Cod Baseball League.

As a sophomore, Flaherty had a .381 batting average with 57 RBI, 23 doubles, four homers and an on-base percentage of .438 in 67 games. He was named Second-team All-American selection by Rivals.com and the American Baseball Coaches Association (ABCA). He was also selected to the ABCA All-South Region Team as well as Second-Team All-SEC.

== Professional career ==
=== Chicago Cubs ===
The Chicago Cubs selected Flaherty in the first round (41st overall) of the 2008 MLB draft. In four seasons in both A and AA, Flaherty played 322 games with a .279 batting average, on-base percentage of .347, slugging percentage of .455, 182 RBI, 38 homers and 79 doubles. He had his two best professional seasons in 2009 and 2010. While in the Cubs organization he was ranked as the 8th best prospect.

=== Baltimore Orioles ===
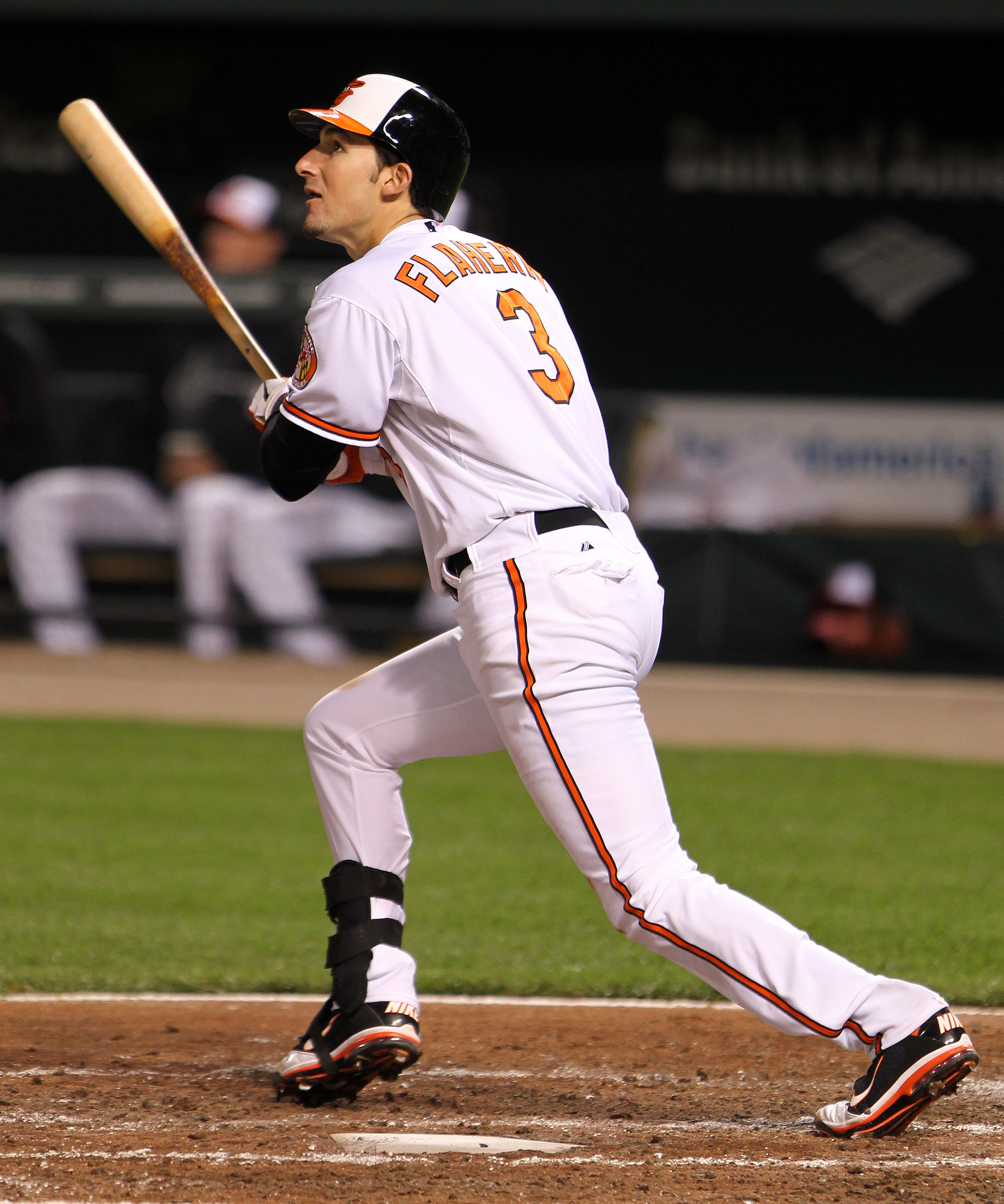
Flaherty against the Blue Jays on April 24, 2012

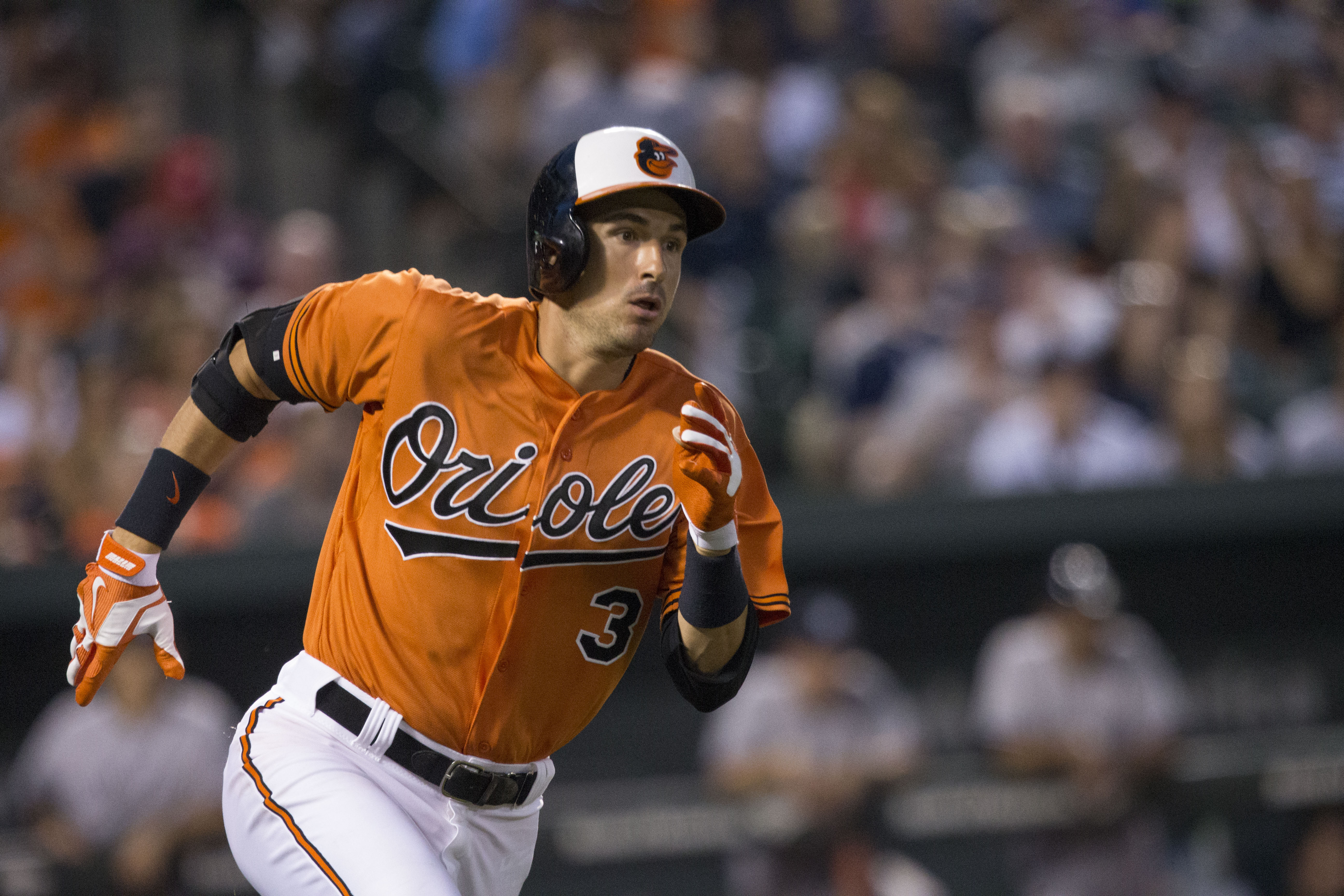
Flaherty playing with the Orioles in 2015

The Baltimore Orioles selected Flaherty from the Cubs in the Rule 5 Draft on December 8, 2011. He made the Orioles' Opening Day roster. He scored his first run in MLB on April 14 against the Blue Jays in Toronto. He had his first MLB RBI on April 26, 2012, when he drove in Chris Davis on a sacrifice fly in the bottom of the fifth inning off of Drew Hutchinson of the Toronto Blue Jays. In that same game, he collected his first MLB hit on a bunt single in the bottom of the seventh inning off of Luis Perez. He hit his first MLB home run as part of three consecutive home runs off Colby Lewis of the Texas Rangers to start the first inning of the first game of a May 10, 2012, doubleheader at Camden Yards. Teammates J. J. Hardy and Nick Markakis followed with home runs.

On September 28, 2012, he hit his first career grand slam off Boston Red Sox pitcher Aaron Cook. On October 10, 2012, Flaherty hit a home run in Game 3 of the 2012 American League Division Series, becoming the first native of Maine to hit a home run in the MLB postseason. Flaherty had his first multi-home run game on June 23, 2013, against the Toronto Blue Jays.

Flaherty became the seventh position player to make a pitching appearance in Orioles history in a 12–2 loss to the Houston Astros at Camden Yards on August 20, 2016. He had entered the game as a third baseman in the eighth inning. Throwing 19 pitches in the ninth, he surrendered two earned runs and three hits on a leadoff homer by Jason Castro and consecutive one-out doubles from George Springer and Alex Bregman.

Flaherty was contracted with the Orioles through the 2016 season. His base salary was $1.5 million. His role with the Orioles was primarily as a utility infielder with occasional service in the outfield. Flaherty finished the 2016 season with a .217 batting average.

Flaherty and the Orioles avoided arbitration when they agreed to a one-year, $1.8 million contract for the 2017 season.

=== Philadelphia Phillies ===
On February 9, 2018, Flaherty signed a minor league deal with the Philadelphia Phillies. He was released on March 22.

=== Atlanta Braves ===
On March 26, 2018, the Atlanta Braves signed Flaherty to a one-year contract worth $750,000. In 76 games for Atlanta, Flaherty hit .222 with 2 home runs and 13 RBI. Flaherty was designated for assignment by the Braves on August 20, following the promotion of Bryse Wilson. On August 23, Flaherty cleared waivers and was sent outright to the Triple–A Gwinnett Stripers. On September 2, the Braves select Flaherty's contract, adding him back to the major league roster. He was active on the Braves NLDS roster as a bench player alongside Lane Adams, Lucas Duda and René Rivera. He would end up appearing in the third and fourth games of the series.

=== Cleveland Indians ===
On February 7, 2019, Flaherty signed a minor league deal with the Cleveland Indians. After being informed he would not make the opening day major league roster, Flaherty opted out of his contract on March 20, 2019. Flaherty re-signed on a minor-league deal on March 31 and the organization assigned him to their Triple–A affiliate, the Columbus Clippers. On September 1, the Indians selected Flaherty's contract.

== Coaching career ==
On November 24, 2019, Flaherty became an advance scout and development coach for the San Diego Padres.

On June 11, 2022, Flaherty was named the acting manager of the Padres after Bob Melvin was placed in COVID-19 protocols. Flaherty was named bench coach of the Padres on February 3, 2023.

On January 2, 2024, the Chicago Cubs announced that Flaherty was hired as the bench coach, replacing Andy Green, who departed the Cubs following the hiring of Craig Counsell.

== Personal life ==
Flaherty married Ashley Dutko, the sister of Nick Markakis's wife Christina Dutko, in 2016.

== See also ==
- Rule 5 draft results
