= Adam Jones (baseball) =

American baseball player (born 1985)

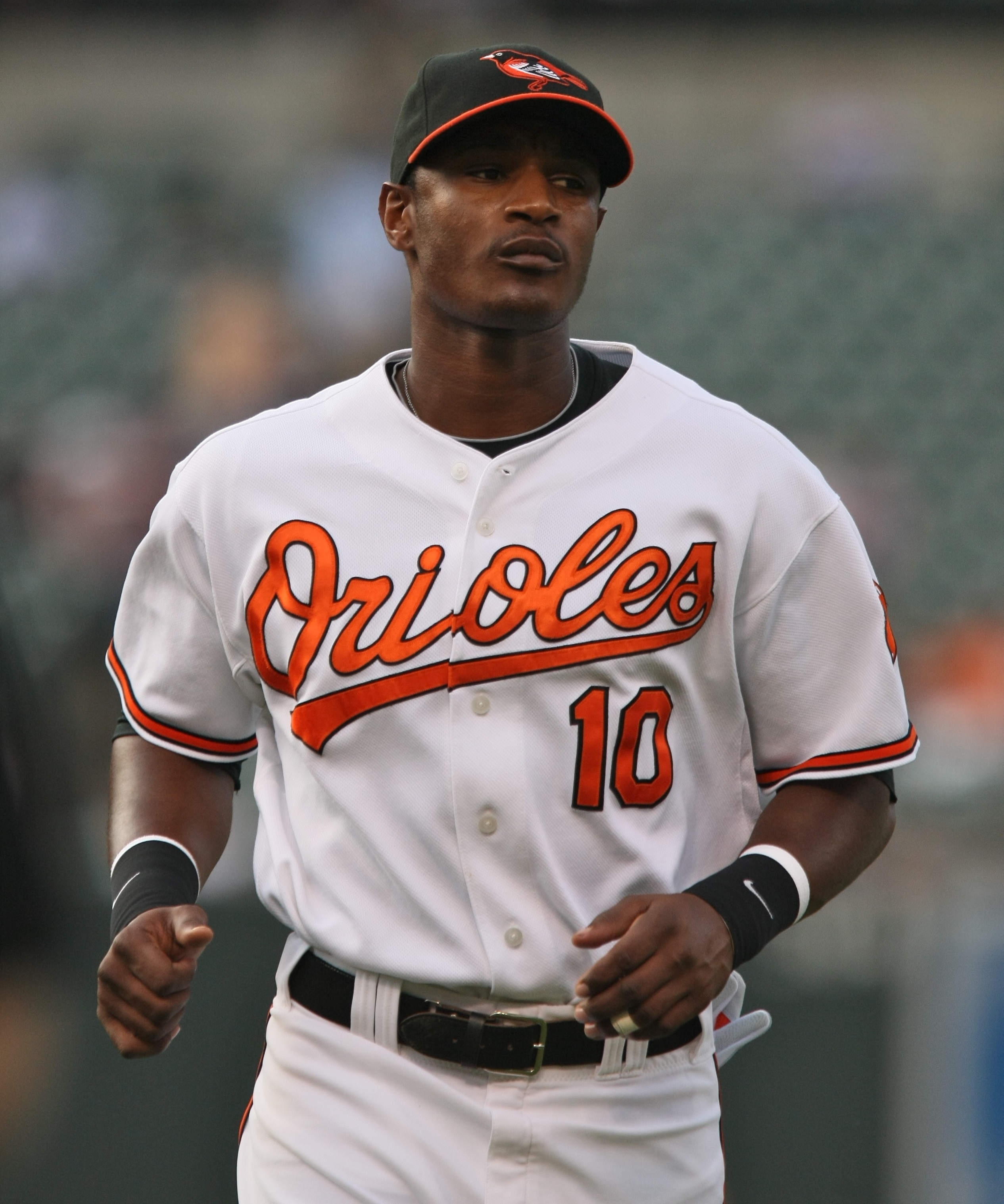
- Jones with the Baltimore Orioles in 2009
- Center fielder
- Born: August 1, 1985 (age 41); San Diego, California, U.S.
- Batted: Right Threw: Right

Professional debut
- MLB: July 14, 2006, for the Seattle Mariners
- NPB: June 19, 2020, for the Orix Buffaloes

Last appearance
- MLB: September 28, 2019, for the Arizona Diamondbacks
- NPB: September 19, 2021, for the Orix Buffaloes

MLB statistics
- Batting average: .277
- Home runs: 282
- Runs batted in: 945

NPB statistics
- Batting average: .250
- Home runs: 16
- Runs batted in: 66
- Stats at Baseball Reference

Teams
- Seattle Mariners (2006–2007); Baltimore Orioles (2008–2018); Arizona Diamondbacks (2019); Orix Buffaloes (2020–2021)

Career highlights and awards
- 5× All-Star (2009, 2012–2015); 4× Gold Glove Award (2009, 2012–2014); Silver Slugger Award (2013); Baltimore Orioles Hall of Fame
Medals
Men's baseball
Representing United States
World Baseball Classic
Gold medal – first place	2017 Los Angeles	Team

Adam LaMarque Jones (born August 1, 1985) is an American former professional baseball center fielder. He played parts of 14 seasons in Major League Baseball (MLB) for the Seattle Mariners, Baltimore Orioles, and Arizona Diamondbacks and two seasons in Nippon Professional Baseball (NPB) for the Orix Buffaloes. Internationally, Jones played for the United States, helping the U.S. win the 2017 World Baseball Classic.

The Mariners selected Jones in the first round of the 2003 MLB draft. He came up in the Mariners' minor league system as a shortstop before transitioning to the outfield. He made his MLB debut with the Mariners in 2006 and was traded to the Orioles before the 2008 season. Jones is a five-time MLB All-Star, a four-time Gold Glove Award winner, a Silver Slugger winner, and won the Marvin Miller Man of the Year Award in 2015. He played the most games in center field in Orioles franchise history and competed in three postseasons with the team.

== Early life ==
Adam Jones was born in San Diego, California on August 1, 1985. His mother solely raised him and his older brother until he was five. Growing up in San Diego, he was a fan of the San Diego Padres and Tony Gwynn. Jones excelled at both football and basketball but did not pick up a baseball bat until he was 12. In 1997, his stepfather, Kenneth, took him to a Padres game, starting Jones' interest in the sport. He picked up the sport quickly and went on to star on his high school team. Jones graduated from Morse High School in 2003 after leading his high school team as both a pitcher and a shortstop. During his senior season he batted .406, hit four home runs and batted in 27 runs. On the mound, Jones had a 3–0 record with a 2.71 ERA. Jones and future Baltimore Orioles teammate Quintin Berry were high school teammates. Jones committed to play college baseball at San Diego State University, where Gwynn was coaching.

== Professional career ==
=== Seattle Mariners ===
==== 2003–2005: Draft and position changes ====
Jones was selected by the Seattle Mariners with the 37th pick in the first round of the 2003 MLB draft as a shortstop and pitcher. Jones was a good pitching prospect, throwing faster than 90 miles per hour from the mound, but he preferred playing every day. He started his professional career as a shortstop with the Arizona League Mariners and Everett Aquasox in 2003. In 2005, the Mariners, with Yuniesky Betancourt starting at shortstop in the majors, asked Jones to switch to center field. He agreed, first playing the position regularly with the Peoria Javelinas in the Arizona Fall League. As a prospect, Baseball America consistently rated Jones as one of the best athletes and having the best throwing arm in the Mariners' minor league system.

==== 2006–07: MLB debut ====
The Mariners called up Jones from the Tacoma Rainiers on July 14, 2006. He replaced corner outfielder Shin-Soo Choo, whose attempt to fill in for injured center fielder Jeremy Reed was unsuccessful. Jones made his MLB debut that night, going 0-for-3 with a walk in a 5–3 victory over the Toronto Blue Jays. After going hitless in his first 12 at bats, he got his first major league hit on July 18 when he singled off Sidney Ponson in a loss to the New York Yankees. Jones hit his first home run in the majors off Adam Eaton in an 8–2 loss to the Texas Rangers on August 10.

Jones began 2007 back in the minors. On August 3, he returned to MLB for the first time that season, starting in right field against the Boston Red Sox. He went 2-for-4 and scored two runs in the 7–4 victory. In two partial seasons with the Mariners, Jones played in 73 games, batting .230 with 3 home runs, 12 RBIs, and 5 stolen bases. Jones was much more productive with the Triple-A Tacoma Rainiers, leading or co-leading the team in home runs, RBI, and triples in both 2006 and 2007.

=== Baltimore Orioles ===
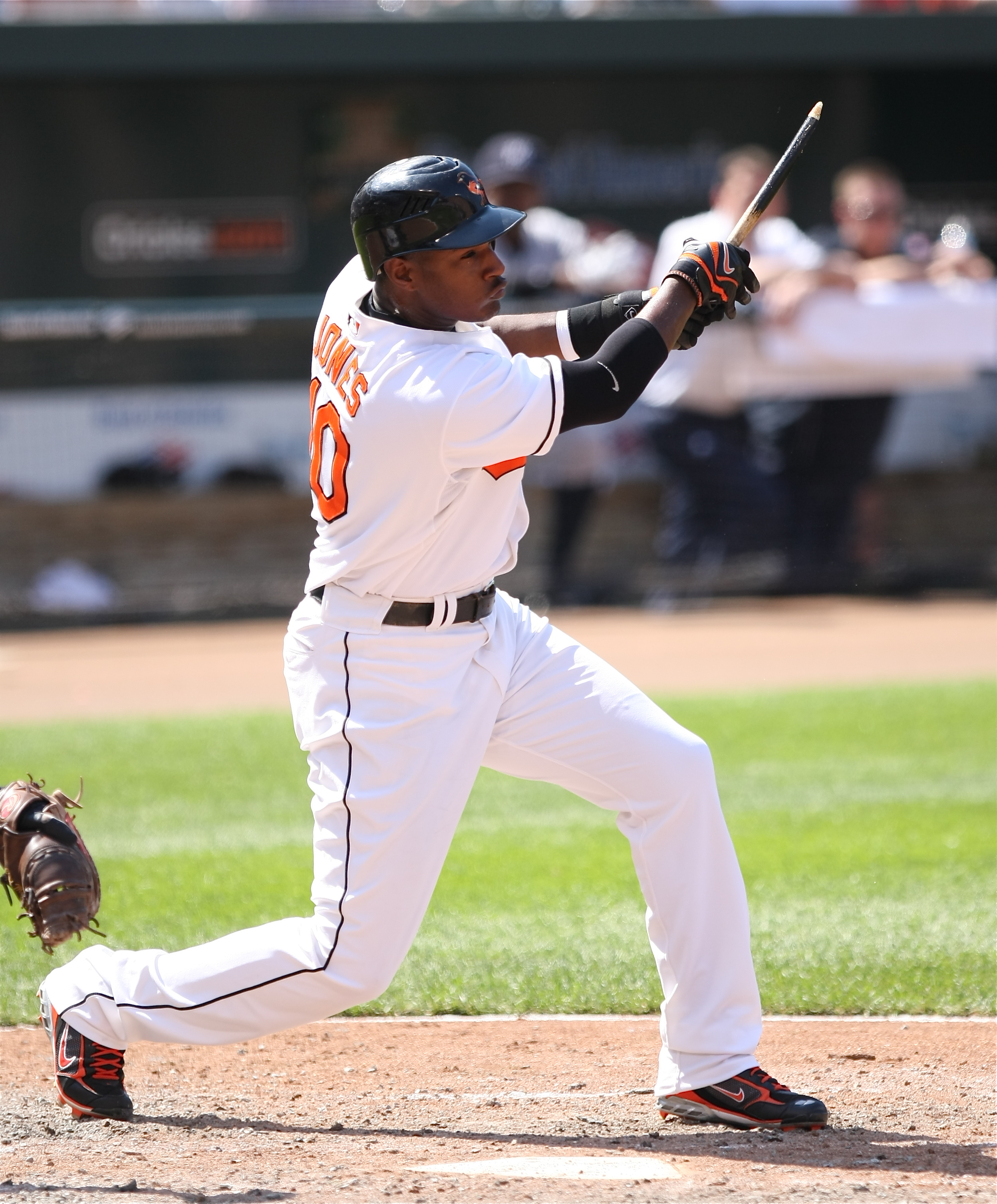
Jones with a broken bat in 2008

==== 2008 ====
On February 8, 2008, the Mariners traded Jones, reliever George Sherrill and minor league pitchers Kam Mickolio, Chris Tillman, and Tony Butler to the Baltimore Orioles for starting pitcher Érik Bédard.

On July 28, Jones became the second player ever to hit a triple and a grand slam in the same game as a visitor to Yankee Stadium, following Pat Seerey in 1945. On September 21, Jones hit the final triple at Yankee Stadium, subsequently scoring the first run of the game.

Jones finished his first season with the Orioles batting .270 to go along with nine home runs, 57 RBIs, and 10 stolen bases in 132 games. He was tied for 11th in the major leagues with seven triples.

==== 2009: First All-Star and Gold Glove Award ====
After a strong start to the season, Jones was selected to represent Baltimore in the 2009 All-Star Game on July 5. In the game, he drove in Curtis Granderson on a sacrifice fly for the winning run in the American League's 4–3 victory.

The second half was not as kind to Jones though, and on September 1, he sprained his left ankle while running the bases, missing the rest of the 2009 season. He finished the season with a .277 batting average, 19 homers, 70 RBI and 10 stolen bases in 119 games. He tied for fifth among major league center fielders with nine outfield assists. He won his first Gold Glove for his defensive play.

==== 2010 ====
Jones hit an inside-the-park home run on May 22, when center fielder Nyjer Morgan, apparently not realizing the ball was still on the playing field, threw his glove down in disgust after not catching the ball.

Jones finished his third season in Baltimore with a .284 batting average, 19 homers, 69 RBI and seven stolen bases in 149 games. He led all center fielders and was second in the majors in outfield assists with 12.

==== 2011 ====
Jones had the best offensive season of his career so far. On August 6, in a game against the Toronto Blue Jays, he hit his then career high 20th home run of the season. In 2011, Jones led the major leagues with 12 sacrifice flies, and led all AL outfielders with 8 errors.

==== 2012: Second All-Star and Gold Glove Award ====
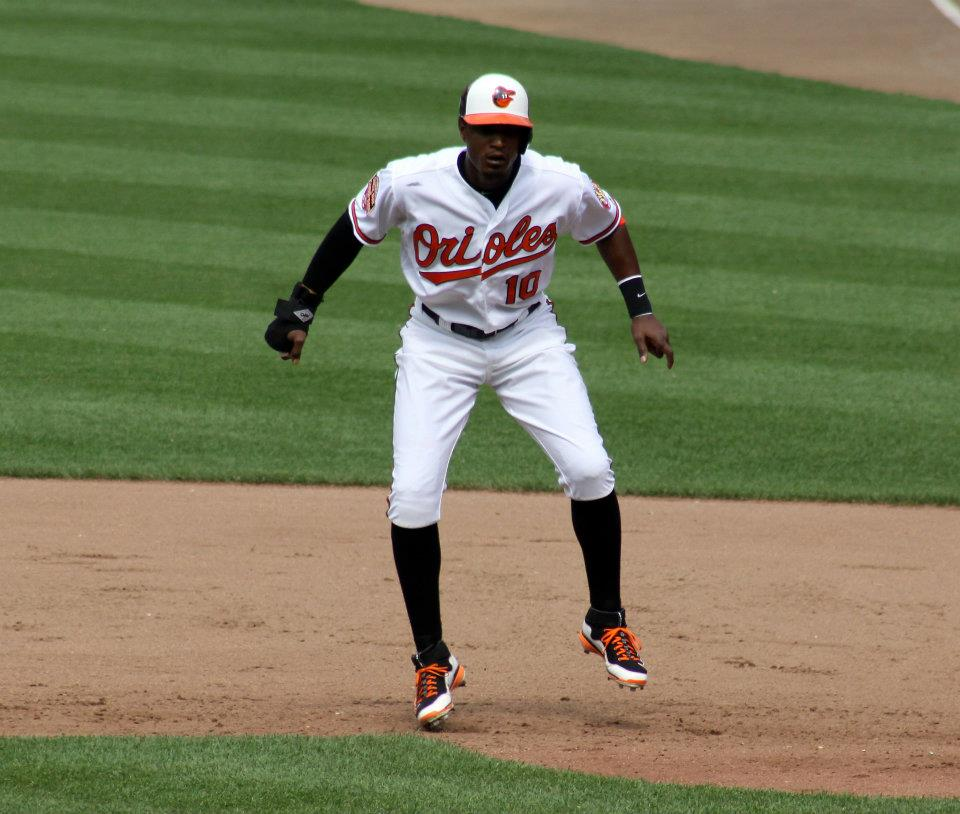
Adam Jones takes a lead off first base during a 2012 game.

Jones started the 2012 season hitting .310 with 14 home runs and 31 RBIs through the Orioles' first 46 games. On May 26, he and Orioles agreed to a six-year contract extension worth at least $85.5 million. Escalators could raise that total to $91.5 million over the same period. The contract was the largest in Orioles history, surpassing previous contracts for Miguel Tejada and Nick Markakis, and made Jones the second highest paid center fielder, behind Matt Kemp of the Los Angeles Dodgers. Jones hit the second walk-off home run of his career on June 9, a two-run home run in the bottom of the 12th inning that resulted in a 6–4 victory for the Orioles over the Philadelphia Phillies. On July 1, Jones was selected to the All-Star Game.

Jones hit the 100th home run of his career on August 28 against the Chicago White Sox. Two days later, he established a new career high by hitting his 26th home run of the season, also against the White Sox. Jones played in all 162 games in 2012, batting .287 with 32 home runs and 82 RBI. Jones was named the Most Valuable Oriole for the second consecutive season. He won his second Gold Glove award and finished sixth in AL Most Valuable Player voting, the highest rank of his career.

The Orioles made the playoffs the wild card team. In the AL Wild Card Game, Jones hit a sacrifice fly to drive in a run in the Orioles' 5–1 win over the Rangers. The Orioles would later lose in five games to the New York Yankees in the American League Division Series. Jones slumped in the playoffs, hitting two singles in 26 at bats.

==== 2013: All-Star and Silver Slugger ====
Prior to the 2013 season, Jones played for the United States national team in the 2013 World Baseball Classic. Jones was voted by fans to start in the All-Star Game. It was his third All-Star game.

Jones finished a strong 2013 season batting .285 with 33 home runs and 108 RBI, both of which were new career highs. He did, however, draw only 25 walks and finished with a .318 on-base percentage, his lowest since 2008. On August 11, Jones said on Twitter that a fan threw a banana towards him during a game at AT&T Park in San Francisco. Jones won his only Silver Slugger award and his third Gold Glove award.

After the Orioles failed to make the 2013 playoffs, Jones joined MLB Network as an analyst for the postseason.

==== 2014 ====
On April 13, Jones recorded his 1,000th career hit off Toronto's Mark Buehrle. In a game against the Houston Astros on May 11, Jones singled with the bases loaded and drove in his 500th and 501st RBIs. Jones was again voted by fans to start in the All-Star Game. After the season, he won his third consecutive Gold Glove award.

The Orioles won the American League East and swept the Detroit Tigers in the American League Division Series in three games before being swept in four games in the American League Championship Series by the Kansas City Royals. Jones continued to struggle in the postseason, batting .222 with 1 home run and 3 RBIs in 7 games.

After the season, Jones traveled to Japan to play in the MLB Japan All-Star Series, as a team of MLB stars played against Nippon Professional Baseball stars.

==== 2015: Final All-Star and Marvin Miller Award ====
Jones was selected to his fifth and final All-Star Game, his fourth in a row. He was originally chosen as a reserve but started the exhibition due to an injury to Kansas City outfielder Alex Gordon. During the Orioles' final game before the All-Star break, Jones hit two home runs against the Washington Nationals, his seventh career multi-home run game. On July 30, Jones hit the 182nd home run of his Orioles career, which tied him for seventh on the team's all-time list with Ken Singleton. The very next night, Jones hit a three-run home run, giving him sole possession of seventh place on the all-time Orioles home run list. It was also his one hundredth career home run in Baltimore. On August 16, Jones went 3-for-4 and hit two home runs in an 18–2 rout of the Oakland Athletics. It was Jones' eighth career multi-home run game.

Jones played in 137 games in 2015, his lowest total since 2009. He hit a career-low .269 with 27 home runs and 82 RBI. The Orioles finished the season with a .500 record. Jones won the Marvin Miller Man of the Year award, chosen by other MLB players as someone "whose leadership most inspires others to higher levels of achievement."

==== 2016 ====
Jones started the 2016 season batting second in the starting lineup. He went 1-for-5 with an RBI in the season opener, in a 3–2 win over the Minnesota Twins. On April 6, Jones injured himself during an at-bat late in the game. He sat out for the next four days, before returning on April 11 as a defensive replacement. He wouldn't start again until April 14. Jones hit .224 in April after collecting 15 hits in 67 at-bats. He only hit one home run while driving in seven runs.

After going 1-for-5 in a victory over the Athletics on May 8, Jones' average dipped to .200. He later tweeted "Gonna figure it allllll out. Part of the grind. #StayHungry" that day. Over the next week, Jones collected 13 hits, four home runs, nine RBIs, hit .520, and had two game-winning hits (two-run single & solo homerun). On May 13, Jones hit his 200th career home run in a game against Detroit. On June 2, Jones hit two home runs as the Orioles hit a season-high seven home runs in a game. His second home run, hit in the eighth inning, was his 200th home run with the Orioles. In addition, his first homer in the game came from the leadoff spot, giving him a home run in each spot in the lineup. On July 8, Jones passed Brady Anderson for sole possession of sixth place on the Orioles all-time home run list with 210.

Jones finished 2016 slashing .265/.310/.436 with an OPS of .746. He hit 29 home runs while driving in 83 runs. He swung at almost 45 percent of pitches outside the strike zone and 60.6 percent of all pitches he saw, both of which were the highest in the major leagues. Jones batted 1-for-5 with a run scored in the Orioles Wild Card Game loss.

==== 2017 ====
During the second game of the season, Jones hit his 223rd career home run as an Oriole, tying him for fifth all-time in franchise history with Rafael Palmeiro. Jones would pass Palmeiro five games later. At Fenway Park on May 1, a Red Sox fan throw peanuts at Jones while he was running into the dugout at the end of an inning, and another fan(s) directed a barrage of racial slurs at Jones. The next day, on May 2, Jones received a welcoming ovation at Fenway. On May 3, Jones was ejected for the first time in his career by home plate umpire Sam Holbrook for arguing balls and strikes. On May 10, Jones recorded his 745th career RBI as an Oriole, surpassing Brady Anderson for sixth most all-time in franchise history. On May 21, Jones hit his 124th career home run at Camden Yards, tying him with Palmeiro for most home runs in ballpark history. The following night, Jones passed Palmeiro with a three-run homer. Jones was also first all-time in extra-base hits and RBIs at Camden Yards. On August 28, Jones hit the 250th home run of his career. On September 1, Jones was ejected in the first inning of a game against the Blue Jays, after expressing his displeasure with a strike call. It was the second ejection of his career.

==== 2018: Final season in Baltimore ====
On Opening Day against the Twins on March 29, Jones hit a walk-off home run as the Orioles won 3–2. On April 5, Jones drove in two runs, moving him past Ken Williams for sixth-most RBIs in Orioles/Browns history. On April 26, Jones tied Boog Powell for sixth-most extra-base hits in franchise history with 557.

On August 10, Jones made his first start as a right fielder for the Orioles after playing 1,555 in center field, ceding center to Cedric Mullins. During the game, he collected a stolen base, the 86th of his Orioles career, moving him into 10th place all-time in Orioles history. Jones started the most games in center field for the Orioles, and ranked second in games, putouts, assists, and Gold Gloves won, all behind Paul Blair. Jones' 259 career home runs as a center fielder, 13th most in MLB history.

Despite a drop in his power numbers, Jones put up a solid .281/.313/.419 slash line with 15 home runs, the first time he failed to reach 20 since 2010, as well as 63 RBI, 35 doubles, and seven steals in 145 games. He became a free agent at the conclusion of the season.

Jones ranks in the top 10 in several statistics in Orioles history, including hits, doubles, home runs, RBI, runs scored, and strikeouts. He played in five All-Star games and won four Gold Glove awards and one Silver Slugger award while in Baltimore.

=== Arizona Diamondbacks ===
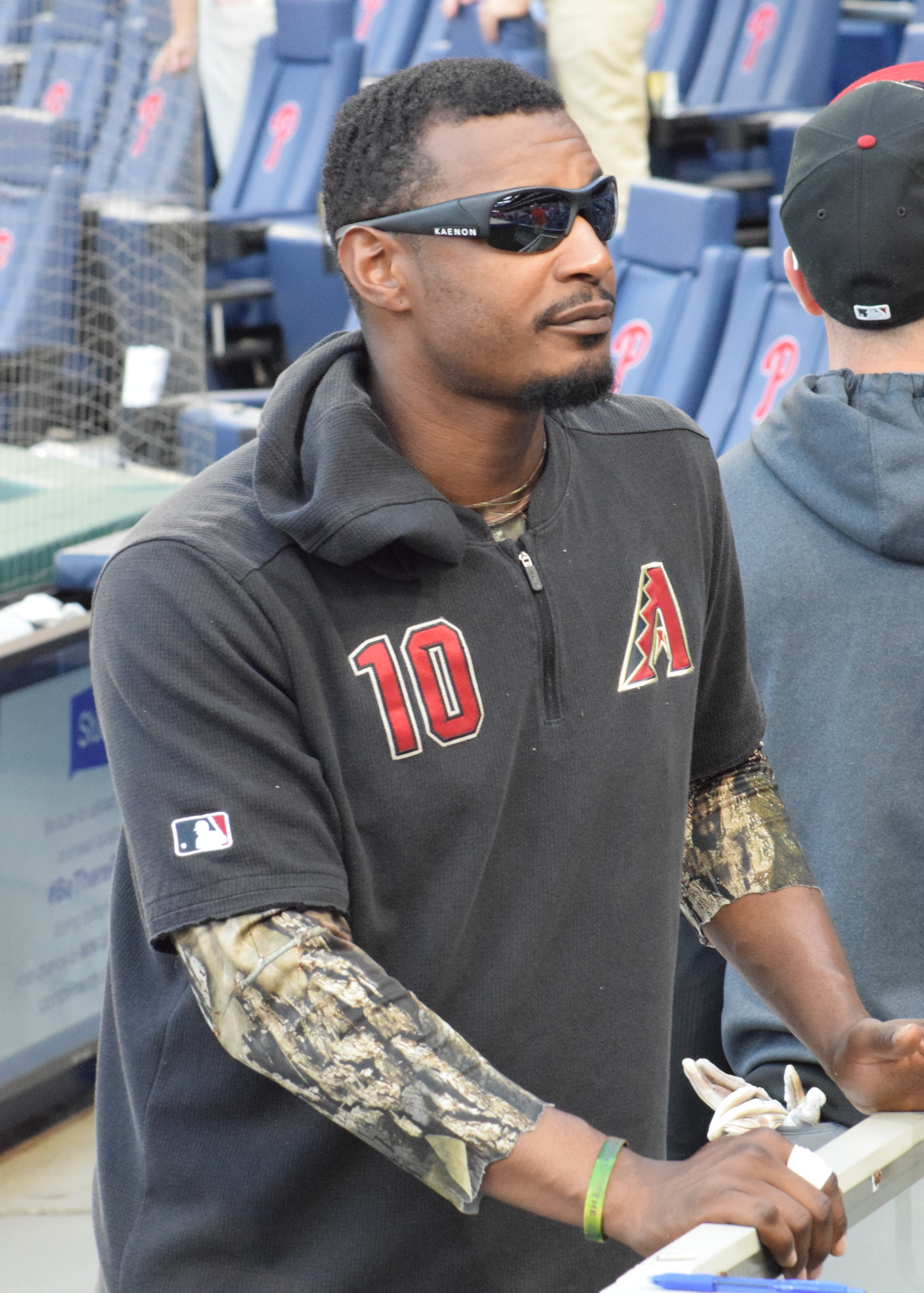
Jones with the Arizona Diamondbacks

On March 11, 2019, Jones signed a one-year, $3 million contract with the Arizona Diamondbacks. In his one season with Arizona, Jones batted .260/.313/.414 with 16 home runs and 67 RBI in 137 games. Defensively, he committed six errors and had the lowest fielding percentage of all major league right fielders (.972), though advanced statistics rated him as below average, but not the worst in the league at the position.

=== Orix Buffaloes ===
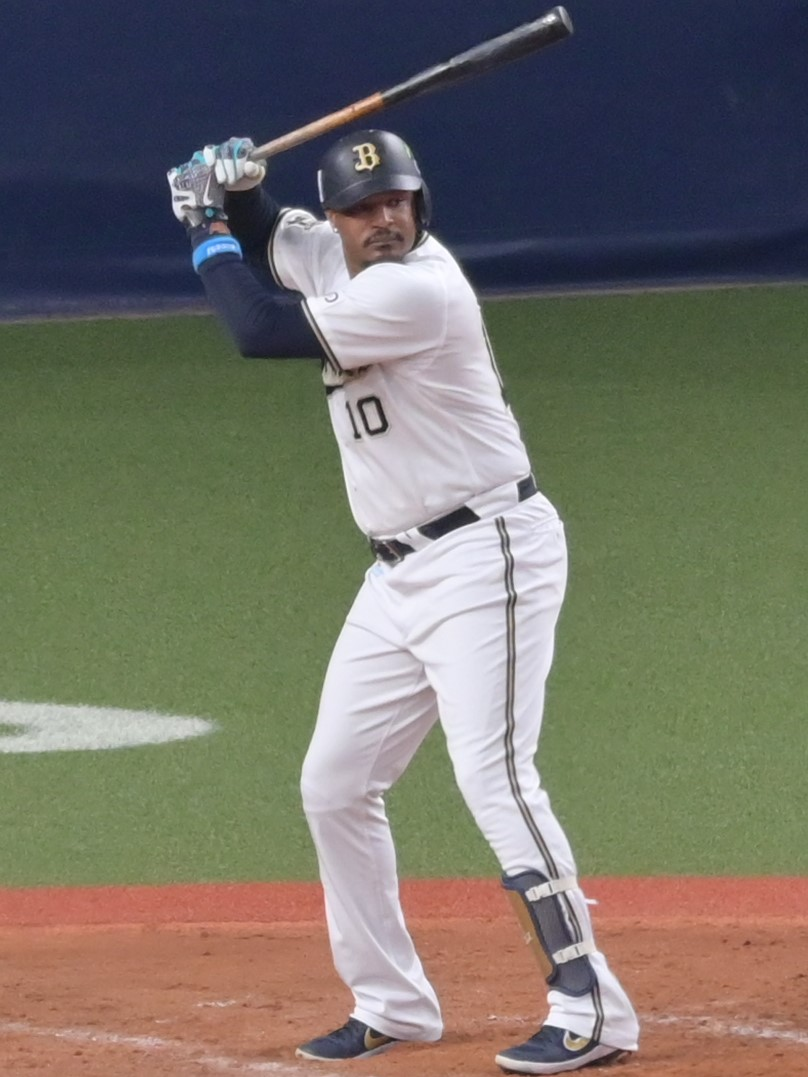
Jones with the Orix Buffaloes in 2021

On December 10, 2019, Jones signed with the Orix Buffaloes of Nippon Professional Baseball on a two-year, $8 million contract.

Jones made his NPB debut on June 19, 2020. In the 2020 season, Jones slashed .258/.331/.417 with 12 doubles, 12 home runs, and 43 RBIs in 87 games.

On November 25, 2021, Jones became known as "Mr. Thanksgiving" for his game-winning home run in the top of the ninth inning in Game 5 of the 2021 Japan Series on the American Thanksgiving holiday to help Orix stave off elimination. He hit .234 with 4 home runs in 71 games in his final season of professional baseball in 2021. Orix opted not to exercise a team option for 2022.

=== Retirement ===
On September 15, 2023, Jones signed a one-day contract with the Baltimore Orioles to officially retire as a member of the team.

== International career ==
Jones played for Team USA in the 2013 World Baseball Classic (WBC) and 2017 WBC.

Jones played in all six games for the U.S. in the 2013 WBC, batting .182 with one double and 4 RBI as the U.S. lost in the second round.

In the 2017 WBC opening round, Jones hit a game-tying solo home run against Venezuela in the eighth inning of a Pool F game, sparking a rally that led to a 4–2 victory. He then helped the U.S. advance to the second round by hitting a 10th-inning walk-off single to beat Colombia. Jones also In the second round, in a game against the Dominican Republic, Jones made a home-run-saving catch, robbing Manny Machado, that helped propel the U.S. to the semifinals. The team went on to win the 2017 championship against Puerto Rico. Jones later said, "To do it with those guys, it was probably the best experience of my life so far, especially with sports." Along with his highlight defense, Jones slashed .200/.243/.429 with 2 doubles, 2 home runs, and 5 RBI.

After retiring as a player, Jones was a hitting coach for Spain, including at the 2025 European Baseball Championship.

== Post-playing career ==
Following the end of his playing career, Jones worked for Major League Baseball's operations department. On January 27, 2025, the Baltimore Orioles hired Jones to serve as an advisor to the general manager and community ambassador.

On July 2, 2026, Jones was announced as the third base coach for the National League at the All-Star Futures Game.

== Personal life ==
On May 29, 2010, Jones was mistakenly detained at the Canadian border while he was trying to get to Toronto. He believed it was a case of mistaken identity; however, he would not disclose whether he was mistaken for Cincinnati Bengals cornerback Adam "Pacman" Jones, who has had numerous brushes with the law.

Jones married Maude "Audie" Fugett, the daughter of Jean Fugett, in late December 2014. They had their first son in March 2014. Jones was the best man at Quintin Berry's wedding and also the godfather to Berry's son.

Jones is a season ticket holder for the San Diego Gulls of the American Hockey League and has served as an off-ice official for the team, primarily in the penalty box. Jones remains a Padres fan and followed the team and former teammate Manny Machado during their 2022 playoff run.

Jones has four tattoos. One of his mother and another of his grandmother, who he calls "the two most important women in my life," on his left shoulder. Whenever crossing the plate after hitting a home run, he would tap his left shoulder as a tribute.

While playing in Japan, Jones started a podcast called Heckle Deez with brother-in-law Reginald Fugett. He and Fugett brought on guests from the baseball community in both the U.S. and Japan, including Wladimir Balentien and C.C. Sabathia. The podcast released 36 episodes in 2020 and 2021 and was relaunched by The Baltimore Banner in 2022 as The Adam Jones Podcast. Jones co-hosts the podcast with Baltimore radio personality Jerry Coleman, with Fugett appearing as a moderator of debates between the two.
