= 2012 American League Division Series =

Teams
Team (Wins)		Manager	Season
New York Yankees (3)		Joe Girardi	95–67 (.586), GA: 2
Baltimore Orioles (2)		Buck Showalter	93–69 (.574), GB: 2
- Dates: October 7–12
- Television: TBS
- TV announcers: Ernie Johnson, Cal Ripken, and John Smoltz
- Radio: ESPN
- Radio announcers: Dan Shulman and Orel Hershiser
- Umpires: Brian Gorman (crew chief), Mark Carlson, Fieldin Culbreth, Mike Everitt, Ángel Hernández, Tony Randazzo

Teams
Team (Wins)		Manager	Season
Detroit Tigers (3)		Jim Leyland	88–74 (.543), GA: 3
Oakland Athletics (2)		Bob Melvin	94–68 (.580), GA: 1
- Dates: October 6–11
- Television: TBS (Games 1, 3); MLB Network (Game 2); TNT (Games 4–5)
- TV announcers: Don Orsillo and Buck Martinez (TBS/TNT); Matt Vasgersian and Jim Kaat (MLBN)
- Radio: ESPN
- Radio announcers: Dave O'Brien and Aaron Boone
- Umpires: Jim Reynolds, Mark Wegner, Dana DeMuth (crew chief), Eric Cooper, Wally Bell, Scott Barry
- ALWC: Baltimore Orioles defeated Texas Rangers, 5–1

The 2012 American League Division Series were two best-of-five playoff series in Major League Baseball’s (MLB) 2012 postseason to determine the participating teams in the 2012 American League Championship Series. The three divisional winners and a fourth team—the winner of a one-game Wild Card playoff— played in two series. TBS carried most of the games, with some on MLB Network or TNT.

The series used the 2–3 format for 2012 because on March 2 the league had implemented the new "wild card" playoff, eliminating the travel day between Games 4 and 5. The 2–3 format was used for best-of-five Championship Series rounds prior to 1985 and for the Division Series rounds from 1995 to 1997. The matchups for the 2012 ALDS were:

- (1) New York Yankees (AL East champions) vs. (5) Baltimore Orioles (Wild Card Game winner): Yankees won the series, 3–2.
- (2) Oakland Athletics (AL West champions) vs. (3) Detroit Tigers (AL Central champions): Tigers won the series, 3–2.

This was the third postseason match-up between the Athletics and the Tigers, and previously the Tigers had defeated the A's 4–0 in the 2006 ALCS. The Yankees and Orioles were meeting in the postseason for the second time; the Yankees had beaten the Orioles 4–1 in the 1996 ALCS, which witnessed the controversial Jeffrey Maier incident in Game 1.

The Tigers went on to defeat the Yankees in the ALCS, then lose the 2012 World Series to the National League champion San Francisco Giants.

== Matchups ==
=== New York Yankees vs. Baltimore Orioles ===
New York won the series, 3–2.

Game	Date	Score	Location	Time	Attendance
1	October 7	New York Yankees – 7, Baltimore Orioles – 2	Oriole Park at Camden Yards	3:31	47,841
2	October 8	New York Yankees – 2, Baltimore Orioles – 3	Oriole Park at Camden Yards	3:11	48,187
3	October 10	Baltimore Orioles – 2, New York Yankees – 3 (12)	Yankee Stadium	3:31	50,497
4	October 11	Baltimore Orioles – 2, New York Yankees – 1 (13)	Yankee Stadium	4:31	49,307
5	October 12	Baltimore Orioles – 1, New York Yankees – 3	Yankee Stadium	2:52	47,081

=== Oakland Athletics vs. Detroit Tigers ===
Detroit won the series, 3–2.

Game	Date	Score	Location	Time	Attendance
1	October 6	Oakland Athletics – 1, Detroit Tigers – 3	Comerica Park	2:56	43,323
2	October 7	Oakland Athletics – 4, Detroit Tigers – 5	Comerica Park	3:28	40,684
3	October 9	Detroit Tigers – 0, Oakland Athletics – 2	O.co Coliseum	2:33	37,090
4	October 10	Detroit Tigers – 3, Oakland Athletics – 4	O.co Coliseum	3:21	36,385
5	October 11	Detroit Tigers – 6, Oakland Athletics – 0	O.co Coliseum	2:56	36,393

== New York vs. Baltimore ==
=== Game 1 ===
October 7, 2012 6:07 pm (EDT) (moved to 8:47 pm EDT due to rain delay) at Oriole Park at Camden Yards in Baltimore, Maryland 53 °F (12 °C), chance of rain
Team	1	2	3	4	5	6	7	8	9	R	H	E
New York	1	0	0	1	0	0	0	0	5	7	10	1
Baltimore	0	0	2	0	0	0	0	0	0	2	8	1
WP: CC Sabathia (1–0) LP: Jim Johnson (0–1); Home runs: NYY: Russell Martin (1); BAL: None; Attendance: 47,841; Boxscore

The Yankees struck first in the first inning off of Jason Hammel when Derek Jeter singled and Ichiro Suzuki doubled to score Jeter for the game's first run, giving the Yankees a 1–0 lead. In the bottom of the third inning, Orioles outfielder Chris Davis singled, followed by a Lew Ford single, a Robert Andino sacrifice bunt, and a single by Nate McLouth, to give the O's a 2–1 lead. Then in the top of the fourth, the Yankees tied the game at two with a Mark Teixeira single with two men on. The game remained tied going into the ninth inning, until a lead-off home run by Russell Martin off of Jim Johnson pushed the Yankees ahead 3–2. Consecutive singles by Raúl Ibañez, Derek Jeter, and Ichiro Suzuki scored Ibanez, giving the Yankees a 4–2 lead. Robinson Canó doubled to score Jeter and Suzuki. Tommy Hunter relieved Johnson and Nick Swisher hit a sacrifice fly to score Canó, making the score 7–2. The Yankees' C.C. Sabathia pitched 8 2/3 innings and after allowing a two-out double to Lew Ford, David Robertson came in to get the final out of the game, giving the Yankees the win and a 1–0 series lead.

=== Game 2 ===
October 8, 2012 8:07 pm (EDT) (moved to 8:47 pm EDT due to rain delay) at Oriole Park at Camden Yards in Baltimore, Maryland 52 °F (11 °C), chance of rain
Team	1	2	3	4	5	6	7	8	9	R	H	E
New York	1	0	0	0	0	0	1	0	0	2	9	2
Baltimore	0	0	2	0	0	1	0	0	X	3	7	2
WP: Wei-Yin Chen (1–0) LP: Andy Pettitte (0–1) Sv: Jim Johnson (1); Attendance: 48,187; Boxscore

The Game 2 pitching matchup was a sharp contrast, pitting postseason veteran Andy Pettitte against rookie Wei-Yin Chen. Similar to the first game, both Jeter and Suzuki would reach base. With two men on and nobody out, Alex Rodriguez hit a sinking line drive which was speared in the air by Robert Andino, who then doubled up Derek Jeter off second. Later in the inning, Robinson Canó ripped a double down the right field line, and Ichiro Suzuki masterfully avoided the tag of Matt Wieters to score, giving the Yankees an early 1–0 lead.

It was all for naught, however, as Pettitte allowed the Orioles to load the bases with two outs on two singles and a walk, then gave up a two-run single to Chris Davis in the third inning. Baltimore tacked on some insurance in the sixth on a Mark Reynolds single. The Yankees threatened in the seventh when Jeter hit a single to make it 3–2. New York had players on second and third with two out in that inning, but Nick Swisher flied out to end the inning. Jim Johnson got the save to send the series to the Bronx tied at one game apiece.

=== Game 3 ===
October 10, 2012 7:37 pm (EDT) at Yankee Stadium in Bronx, New York 62 °F (17 °C), clear
Team	1	2	3	4	5	6	7	8	9	10	11	12	R	H	E
Baltimore	0	0	1	0	1	0	0	0	0	0	0	0	2	7	0
New York	0	0	1	0	0	0	0	0	1	0	0	1	3	7	0
WP: David Robertson (1–0) LP: Brian Matusz (0–1); Home runs: BAL: Ryan Flaherty (1), Manny Machado (1); NYY: Raúl Ibañez 2 (2); Attendance: 50,497; Boxscore

Baltimore had a 2–1 lead going into the ninth inning behind a strong performance by Miguel González. Rookies Ryan Flaherty and Manny Machado became the first pair of rookies to ever homer for the same team in the same game. Machado's blast ranked him as the second youngest player in postseason history, behind the Yankees' own Andruw Jones who had done so against the Yankees while with the Atlanta Braves in the 1996 World Series. Machado also became the youngest nine-hole hitter to homer in a postseason game at 20 years, 96 days. Flaherty's home run in the third off of Hiroki Kuroda put the Orioles up 1–0 before the Yankees tied the score in the bottom half when Russell Martin doubled with one out and scored on Derek Jeter's triple. Machado's home run in the fifth put Baltimore up 2–1. Heading to the ninth inning and three outs away from a 2–1 series deficit, the Yankees sent up Raúl Ibañez to pinch-hit for a struggling Alex Rodriguez with one out. Ibañez then lined a home run into the right field seats off Orioles closer Jim Johnson to tie the game in the ninth inning. Then in the 12th inning, Ibañez crushed the first pitch of the inning into the second deck of Yankee Stadium to win the game and take a series lead in walk-off fashion. Ibanez's heroics in this game marked the second time in eight days that he provided the game tying and walk-off hits for the Yankees. During a game against the Red Sox on October 2, 2012, Ibanez hit a game-tying 2-run home run off Andrew Bailey in the 9th inning, and then hit a walk-off single off of Andrew Miller in the 12th.

At age 40, Ibañez set at least four MLB postseason records with his two home runs.

=== Game 4 ===
October 11, 2012 7:37 pm (EDT) at Yankee Stadium in Bronx, New York 57 °F (14 °C), clear
Team	1	2	3	4	5	6	7	8	9	10	11	12	13	R	H	E
Baltimore	0	0	0	0	1	0	0	0	0	0	0	0	1	2	8	1
New York	0	0	0	0	0	1	0	0	0	0	0	0	0	1	7	0
WP: Pedro Strop (1–0) LP: David Phelps (0–1) Sv: Jim Johnson (2); Home runs: BAL: Nate McLouth (1); NYY: None; Attendance: 49,307; Boxscore

Game 4 was another marathon affair. Joe Saunders and Phil Hughes matched zeroes for four innings, before Nate McLouth led off the fifth for Baltimore with a home run. The Yankees responded in the sixth when Robinson Canó had an RBI groundout, but they left a runner in scoring position in that inning when Alex Rodriguez struck out. Rodriguez also left men on second and third with one out in the bottom of the eighth, dropping his batting average for the series down to .125 and continuing to draw the scorn of Yankees fans.

The game remained tied until the 13th inning, when Manny Machado hit a leadoff double off of David Phelps, then scored on an RBI double to J. J. Hardy. Jim Johnson got his second save of the series, ensuring a deciding Game 5 the next day.

This was the third time a postseason series had back-to-back games going at least 12 innings, joining the 1986 NLCS and the 2004 ALCS.

This was the final game in Jim Thome's Hall of Fame career. He would not appear in Game 5.

=== Game 5 ===
October 12, 2012 5:07 pm (EDT) at Yankee Stadium in Bronx, New York 52 °F (11 °C), cloudy
Team	1	2	3	4	5	6	7	8	9	R	H	E
Baltimore	0	0	0	0	0	0	0	1	0	1	4	0
New York	0	0	0	0	1	1	1	0	X	3	5	0
WP: CC Sabathia (2–0) LP: Jason Hammel (0–1); Home runs: BAL: None; NYY: Curtis Granderson (1); Attendance: 47,081; Boxscore

The Yankees clinched a trip to the ALCS for the third time in four years with a 3–1 win. CC Sabathia gave the Yankees his second big performance of the series, pitching a complete game, giving up one run on four hits while striking out nine. The only nervous moments came in the sixth, when a long fly ball by Nate McLouth was ruled foul and the eighth, when the Orioles loaded the bases with one out, but Sabathia got out of the jam by striking out McLouth and getting J. J. Hardy to ground out.

The Yankees scored first in the fifth, when Game 3 hero Raúl Ibañez singled to score Mark Teixeira, who singled and stole second off of Jason Hammel. The Yankees tacked on some insurance in the sixth, when Derek Jeter walked with an out and scored on an Ichiro Suzuki double, and followed up in the seventh with a Curtis Granderson home run. It proved enough, as the Orioles only scored one run in the eighth on a Lew Ford single with two on. Sabathia got Matt Wieters to ground out for the final out, sending the Yankees to play for the pennant versus the Detroit Tigers. Sabathia was the first Yankee pitcher to pitch a complete game in the postseason since Roger Clemens pitched one against the Seattle Mariners in Game 4 of the 2000 ALCS.

=== Composite line score ===
2012 ALDS (3–2): New York Yankees over Baltimore Orioles

Team	1	2	3	4	5	6	7	8	9	10	11	12	13	R	H	E
Baltimore Orioles	0	0	5	0	2	1	0	1	0	0	0	0	1	10	34	4
New York Yankees	2	0	1	1	1	2	2	0	6	0	0	1	0	16	38	3
Total attendance: 242,913 Average attendance: 48,583

== Oakland vs. Detroit ==
=== Game 1 ===
October 6, 2012 6:07 pm (EDT) at Comerica Park in Detroit, Michigan 49 °F (9 °C), overcast
Team	1	2	3	4	5	6	7	8	9	R	H	E
Oakland	1	0	0	0	0	0	0	0	0	1	4	1
Detroit	1	0	1	0	1	0	0	0	X	3	7	0
WP: Justin Verlander (1–0) LP: Jarrod Parker (0–1) Sv: José Valverde (1); Home runs: OAK: Coco Crisp (1); DET: Alex Avila (1); Attendance: 43,323; Boxscore

Coco Crisp led off the game with a home run on Justin Verlander's fourth pitch, a 1–2 fastball. Verlander threw 26 pitches in the first inning, but he managed to only allow one run. The lead did not last long, as Austin Jackson doubled to lead off the bottom of the first, and moved to third on an infield hit by Quintin Berry. Miguel Cabrera followed with a double play grounder, with Jackson scoring on the play. In the bottom of the third, with the game tied at one, Quintin Berry hit a slow ground ball up the first-base line. A's starter Jarrod Parker fielded the ball, but it rolled out of his glove for an error. That allowed Omar Infante, who doubled earlier in the inning, to score from second base and give the Tigers a 2–1 lead. Alex Avila led off the fifth inning with a first-pitch homer to extend the Detroit lead to 3–1. In the top of the seventh, Verlander struck out Derek Norris to tie a playoff career-high in strikeouts with 11, which he set the prior year in Game 3 of the ALDS against the Yankees, which he won. In the bottom of the seventh, with two runners on, Pat Neshek, pitching for the first time since the death of his one-day-old son, got out of the jam by getting Infante to ground into a force out and striking out Austin Jackson. In the top of the eighth, Brandon Moss came close to a game-tying two-run home run off Joaquín Benoit, but fell just short when the ball held up at the right-field wall for Andy Dirks, who made the catch. José Valverde pitched a scoreless ninth inning for his first save of the 2012 postseason. He struck out two and got George Kottaras to pop up to end the game.

=== Game 2 ===
October 7, 2012 12:07 pm (EDT) at Comerica Park in Detroit, Michigan 50 °F (10 °C), cloudy
Team	1	2	3	4	5	6	7	8	9	R	H	E
Oakland	0	0	1	0	0	0	1	2	0	4	9	1
Detroit	0	0	1	0	0	0	2	1	1	5	11	0
WP: Al Alburquerque (1–0) LP: Grant Balfour (0–1); Home runs: OAK: Josh Reddick (1); DET: None; Attendance: 40,684; Boxscore

Oakland took a 1–0 lead in the top of the third inning when they put together three singles off Tiger starter Doug Fister, with Yoenis Céspedes' base hit driving in the game's first run. Brandon Moss followed with another single, but Tiger right fielder Avisaíl García threw out Coco Crisp at home plate as Crisp was attempting to score from second base. The Tigers tied the score at one in the bottom of the third. Miguel Cabrera hit his second double of the game, moved to third on a single by Prince Fielder, and scored on a slow roller to first off the bat of Delmon Young. Oakland retook the lead in the seventh inning when an RBI single by Cliff Pennington plated Seth Smith, but the lead was short-lived. In the bottom of the frame, Austin Jackson and Omar Infante each hit two-out singles. Miguel Cabrera followed with a short fly ball to center field, which a hard-charging Coco Crisp bobbled and dropped. Jackson and Infante both scored on the error, and the Tigers had their first lead of the game, 3–2. Detroit reliever Joaquín Benoit, however, failed to hold the lead in the next inning. Yoenis Cespedes singled and stole both second and third. With one out and the infield in, Benoit threw a wild pitch that scored Cespedes to tie the game at three. Josh Reddick then quickly untied it one batter later, with a home run to right. For the third time in the game, and fourth time in the series, the A's failed to hold a lead in the bottom of an inning that they had gained in the top of the same inning. Delmon Young greeted reliever Ryan Cook with a single, and was lifted for pinch runner Don Kelly. Jhonny Peralta followed with a single, sending Kelly to second. Kelly and pinch runner Danny Worth then moved up 90 feet (27 m) on a sacrifice bunt by Andy Dirks. Kelly scored on a Cook wild pitch, knotting the game at four. A's closer Grant Balfour was called upon in the ninth to keep the game tied, but could not succeed. After back-to-back one-out singles by Omar Infante and Miguel Cabrera, Prince Fielder was intentionally walked, bringing Don Kelly to the plate. Kelly, a .186 hitter during the regular season, delighted the home crowd by hitting a walk-off sacrifice fly to right that plated Infante with the winning run. Al Alburquerque got the win in relief, while Balfour took the loss.

=== Game 3 ===
October 9, 2012 6:07 pm (PDT) at O.co Coliseum in Oakland, California 66 °F (19 °C), mostly cloudy
Team	1	2	3	4	5	6	7	8	9	R	H	E
Detroit	0	0	0	0	0	0	0	0	0	0	4	0
Oakland	1	0	0	0	1	0	0	0	X	2	5	0
WP: Brett Anderson (1–0) LP: Aníbal Sánchez (0–1) Sv: Grant Balfour (1); Home runs: DET: None; OAK: Seth Smith (1); Attendance: 37,090; Boxscore

Returning home to Oakland, the A's took a 1–0 lead for the third time in the series, but this time it would not be relinquished. Coco Crisp led off the first inning with a single, and moved to second on a walk to Stephen Drew. Yoenis Céspedes followed with an RBI single to center that scored Crisp. Tiger starter Aníbal Sánchez avoided further damage by striking out Brandon Moss and getting Josh Reddick to ground into an inning-ending double play. The A's scored one more time off Sánchez when Seth Smith hit a homer in the fifth, giving the A's a 2–0 lead. That was all the scoring in this game, as the Tiger hitters could manage only four hits and no runs off starter Brett Anderson and three relievers. Grant Balfour redeemed himself from Game 2 by closing the door on the Tigers in the ninth for his first save of the series. The A's turned in several fine defensive plays as well, highlighted by Coco Crisp's over-the-wall catch in center field on a potential home run off the bat of Prince Fielder. Fielder was victimized later by Yoenis Céspedes, who robbed the Tiger first baseman of extra bases with a diving catch of a line drive in left-center.

=== Game 4 ===
October 10, 2012 6:37 pm (PDT) at O.co Coliseum in Oakland, California 58 °F (14 °C), mostly cloudy
Team	1	2	3	4	5	6	7	8	9	R	H	E
Detroit	0	0	1	1	0	0	0	1	0	3	10	1
Oakland	0	0	0	0	0	1	0	0	3	4	8	0
WP: Ryan Cook (1–0) LP: José Valverde (0–1); Home runs: DET: Prince Fielder (1); OAK: None; Attendance: 36,385; Boxscore

For the first time in the series, the Tigers took the first lead of the game. In the top of the third inning, Alex Avila doubled off A's starter A. J. Griffin, took third on a sacrifice bunt by Omar Infante, and scored on a single by Austin Jackson. Prince Fielder made it 2–0 in the fourth with a home run. The A's got one run back in the bottom of the sixth, scoring an unearned run off Tiger starter Max Scherzer. Coco Crisp, who had reached on a Prince Fielder error and advanced to second on a wild pitch, scored on a double by Stephen Drew. Drew, however, was thrown out trying to stretch the hit into a triple. The Tigers got the run back in the top of the eighth. Omar Infante singled, advanced to second on a sacrifice bunt by Austin Jackson, and scored on a single by Avisaíl García. Tiger closer José Valverde was called upon in the ninth to protect the 3–1 lead, the same lead he had when earning the save in Game 1. But the A's greeted Valverde with three straight hits. A single by Josh Reddick and a double by Josh Donaldson were followed by a two-run double off the bat of Seth Smith that tied the game at three. It looked like the game might go into extra innings after Valverde got a pop out and a strikeout, but the A's—who had a league-leading 14 walk-off wins during the regular season—were not done. Coco Crisp hit a two-out, game-winning single to score Smith, sending the home crowd into a wild victory celebration.

=== Game 5 ===
October 11, 2012 6:37 pm (PDT) at O.co Coliseum in Oakland, California 56 °F (13 °C), mostly cloudy
Team	1	2	3	4	5	6	7	8	9	R	H	E
Detroit	0	0	2	0	0	0	4	0	0	6	9	0
Oakland	0	0	0	0	0	0	0	0	0	0	4	1
WP: Justin Verlander (2–0) LP: Jarrod Parker (0–2); Attendance: 36,393; Boxscore

With the series on the line, the teams turned to their Game 1 starters—Justin Verlander for the Tigers and Jarrod Parker for the A's. As he had done so many times after a Tiger loss over the last few seasons, Verlander was the Tigers' stopper. The 2011 Cy Young and MVP winner allowed just four hits and a walk in a complete-game shutout, and only one Oakland baserunner made it as far as second base (Josh Donaldson in the eighth). Verlander also struck out 11 batters for the second time in the series, giving him an ALDS record of 22 K's. The Tiger batters did all of their scoring in just two innings. Omar Infante led off the third inning with a single, advanced to second on a wild pitch, and scored on an Austin Jackson double. Jackson advanced to third on a sacrifice bunt by Quintin Berry and scored on Parker's second wild pitch of the inning. In the top of the seventh, Jhonny Peralta led off with a single and stole second. One out later, Omar Infante singled to send Peralta to third, and Austin Jackson knocked in Peralta with a single off A's reliever Ryan Cook. Quintin Berry drew a walk to load the bases before Cook hit Miguel Cabrera with an 0–2 pitch to force in the Tigers' fourth run of the game. Prince Fielder followed with a run-scoring single off reliever Jerry Blevins, and Stephen Drew's error on a hard grounder by Delmon Young allowed Berry to score the sixth and final run of the game. The Tigers would move on to the ALCS for the second straight season.

This series was an inversion of the 1972 American League Championship Series between the same clubs. In that series. the Athletics won the first two games at Oakland, the Tigers won the next two at Detroit, but the Athletics won the deciding Game 5 2–1 at Tiger Stadium.

=== Composite line score ===
2012 ALDS (3–2): Detroit Tigers over Oakland Athletics

Team	1	2	3	4	5	6	7	8	9	R	H	E
Detroit Tigers	1	0	5	1	1	0	6	2	1	17	41	1
Oakland Athletics	2	0	1	0	1	1	1	2	3	11	30	3
Total attendance: 193,875 Average attendance: 38,775

== See also ==
- 2012 National League Division Series
