= Nate McLouth =

American baseball player (born 1981)

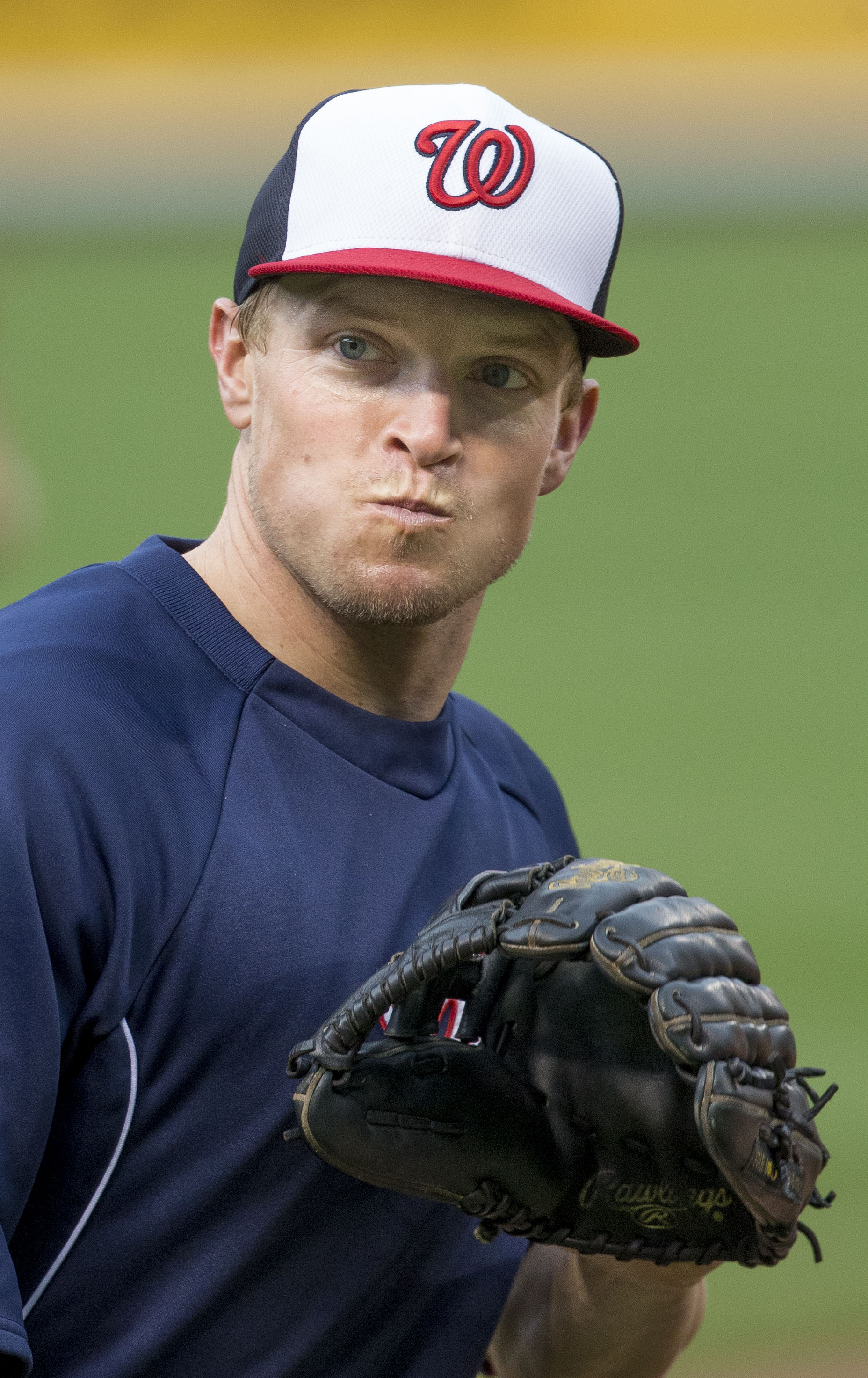
- McLouth with the Washington Nationals in 2014
- Outfielder
- Born: October 28, 1981 (age 44); Muskegon, Michigan, U.S.
- Batted: Left Threw: Right

MLB debut
- June 29, 2005, for the Pittsburgh Pirates

Last MLB appearance
- August 1, 2014, for the Washington Nationals

MLB statistics
- Batting average: .247
- Home runs: 101
- Runs batted in: 333
- Stats at Baseball Reference

Teams
- Pittsburgh Pirates (2005–2009); Atlanta Braves (2009–2011); Pittsburgh Pirates (2012); Baltimore Orioles (2012–2013); Washington Nationals (2014)

Career highlights and awards
- All-Star (2008); Gold Glove Award (2008)

Nathan Richard McLouth (born October 28, 1981) is an American former professional baseball outfielder. He has played in Major League Baseball (MLB) for the Atlanta Braves, Pittsburgh Pirates, Baltimore Orioles and Washington Nationals. He was primarily a center fielder.

== Amateur career ==
Nathan Richard McLouth was born in Muskegon, Michigan, on October 28, 1981, as the oldest of Rick and Pam McLouth's three sons. His brothers are Jake and Christopher. McLouth attended Whitehall Sr. High School, where he was coached by Warren Zweigle. During his high school baseball career, McLouth stole 180 bases in 181 attempts. McLouth was named USA Today Honorable Mention All American in 1999, followed by Michigan's Co-Mr. Baseball, and the state's Gatorade Player of the Year in 2000. He committed to attend the University of Michigan.

== Professional career ==
=== Pittsburgh Pirates ===
McLouth was selected by the Pittsburgh Pirates in the 25th round of the 2000 draft. He opted to sign with Pittsburgh for $500,000, rather than attend college.

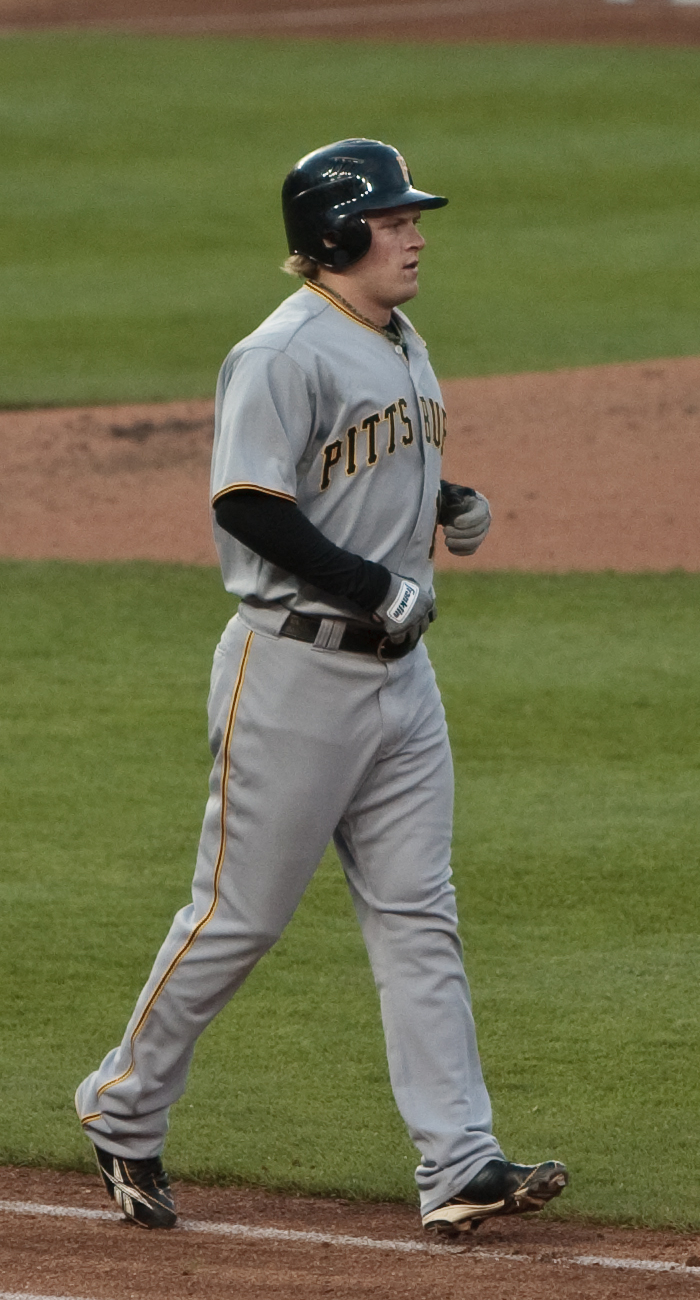
McLouth with the Pittsburgh Pirates in 2009

After an encouraging debut in full-season ball with the Hickory Crawdads, he struggled with the high-A Lynchburg Hillcats in 2002. McLouth rebounded with a strong season at that same level in 2003, however, earning a spot on the league's All-Star team.

McLouth continued to advance steadily through the minors, and on June 29, 2005, he made his major league debut, only a day after he was named an International League All-Star. As a result of an injury to starting center fielder Chris Duffy, McLouth received a substantial amount of playing time through the end of the season. In 109 at-bats, he compiled a .257 batting average, a .305 on-base percentage, and a .450 slugging percentage. McLouth made the Pittsburgh Pirates 2006 opening day lineup as a backup outfielder, sending outfielder Jody Gerut to start the year in Triple-A. At the start of the 2007 season, McLouth changed his uniform number from 59 to 3.

McLouth entered spring training 2008 in a competition with teammate Nyjer Morgan for the starting job as the team's center fielder. McLouth began the 2008 season with a 19-game hitting streak, 20 dating back to 2007, which ended on April 22. McLouth recorded his first career four-hit performance on May 22 against the Milwaukee Brewers. McLouth was selected as a reserve to represent the Pirates in the 2008 MLB All-Star Game, and was among the league leaders in various offensive categories. He also made a clutch throw from center field in the 10th inning to catcher Russell Martin for an out at the plate that cut down Dioner Navarro, the potential game-winning run for the American League. In his final at-bat, with the game tied, McLouth hit a long fly ball that was caught on the right field warning track. The game eventually went fifteen innings before the American League won 4–3 on a sacrifice fly.

In a July 28 game against the Colorado Rockies, McLouth hit a home run that soared over the right field grandstand of PNC Park and landed in the Allegheny River (448 ft from home plate). McLouth received the 2008 Roberto Clemente Award as "the Pirates player who best exemplifies the standard of excellence achieved by Clemente." McLouth was second in NL outfielder fielding percentage to Ryan Braun in 2008, and was awarded the Gold Glove Award for the outfield for his performance. McLouth also led the league in doubles in 2008 with 46.

=== Atlanta Braves ===
After playing 45 games with the Pirates to start the 2009 season, McLouth was traded to the Atlanta Braves for prospects Jeff Locke, Charlie Morton and Gorkys Hernández on June 3, 2009. McLouth, who wore the number 13 while playing for the 2009 Pirates, retained the number for the Braves in 2009. On December 2, 2009, McLouth forfeited his jersey number to new teammate Billy Wagner. Wagner had worn the number 13 since his Major League debut in 1995. McLouth accordingly switched his number to 24, previously worn on the Braves roster by Jordan Schafer. He returned to wearing number 13 for the 2011 season after Wagner retired following the 2010 season.

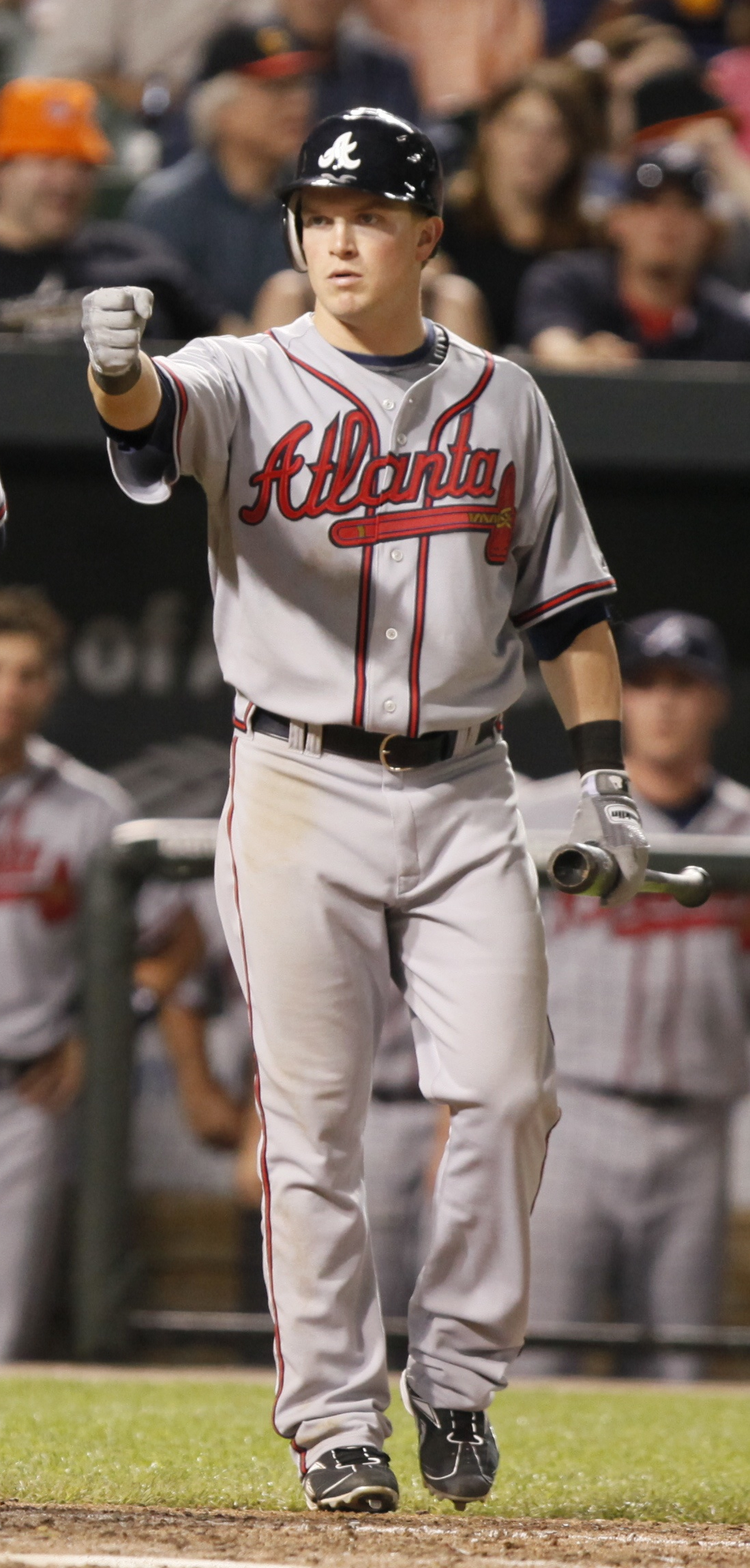
McLouth with the Atlanta Braves in 2009

After joining the club, McLouth played 84 games for the Braves in 2009. His performance for the Braves consisted of a .257 batting average, 11 home runs, and 36 runs batted in. The 2010 season proved to be one of the worst seasons offensively for McLouth. One highlight occurred on June 5, when McLouth collected his 500th Major League hit. McLouth suffered a toe injury and missed a game on June 7 after colliding with the outfield wall at Dodger Stadium. Four days later, he was placed on the disabled list after reporting concussion-like symptoms as a result of a collision with right fielder Jason Heyward. After returning from the injury in July, McLouth faced a horrible slump that warranted his demotion to the Gwinnett Braves, the Triple-A affiliate of the Atlanta Braves. Showing improvement, McLouth was recalled to the Majors on August 31. In his first twelve games after returning, McLouth hit for a .367 batting average, a drastic improvement over the rest of the season. As a result, he made a short-term return to the starting lineup. Nearer the end of the season, McLouth began to struggle again. Despite the rocky season, McLouth made the Braves playoff roster, and was projected to start in left field against the San Francisco Giants in the National League Division Series. However, Matt Diaz started game one in his place.

McLouth spent much of the 2011 season on the disabled list. Feeling significant discomfort in his left oblique, McLouth was placed on the 15-day disabled list on May 23 and replaced on the roster by Jordan Schafer. He remained on the disabled list until June 19. McLouth hit a solo home run on July 17 in the bottom of the eighth inning against the Washington Nationals to tie the game at eight. McLouth was again placed on the disabled list on July 29 for a lower abdominal strain. On August 5, it was revealed that McLouth had a sports hernia and would be out at least six weeks. He would not make another Major League appearance on the season. McLouth exited the 2011 season as a free agent. On October 31, the Braves declined the option on McLouth, effectively ending his stint with the Braves. In parts of three seasons in Atlanta, McLouth hit .229 with 44 doubles, 21 home runs, and 76 RBIs in 250 games.

=== Second stint with the Pirates ===
On December 7, 2011, the Pittsburgh Pirates re-signed McLouth to a one-year, $1.75 million contract with $450,000 in performance-based incentives. Commenting on the signing, McLouth stated, "It's a no-brainer" and that it was "the easiest decision I've ever made in my life." When asked to reflect on his tenure as an Atlanta Brave, McLouth noted, "To struggle performance-wise as much as I did and to have the injuries that I did, it was tough. I'm not going to lie. The past couple years were very, very difficult personally."

After hitting .140 with 18 strikeouts and 2 RBI, on May 25, 2012, McLouth was designated for assignment.

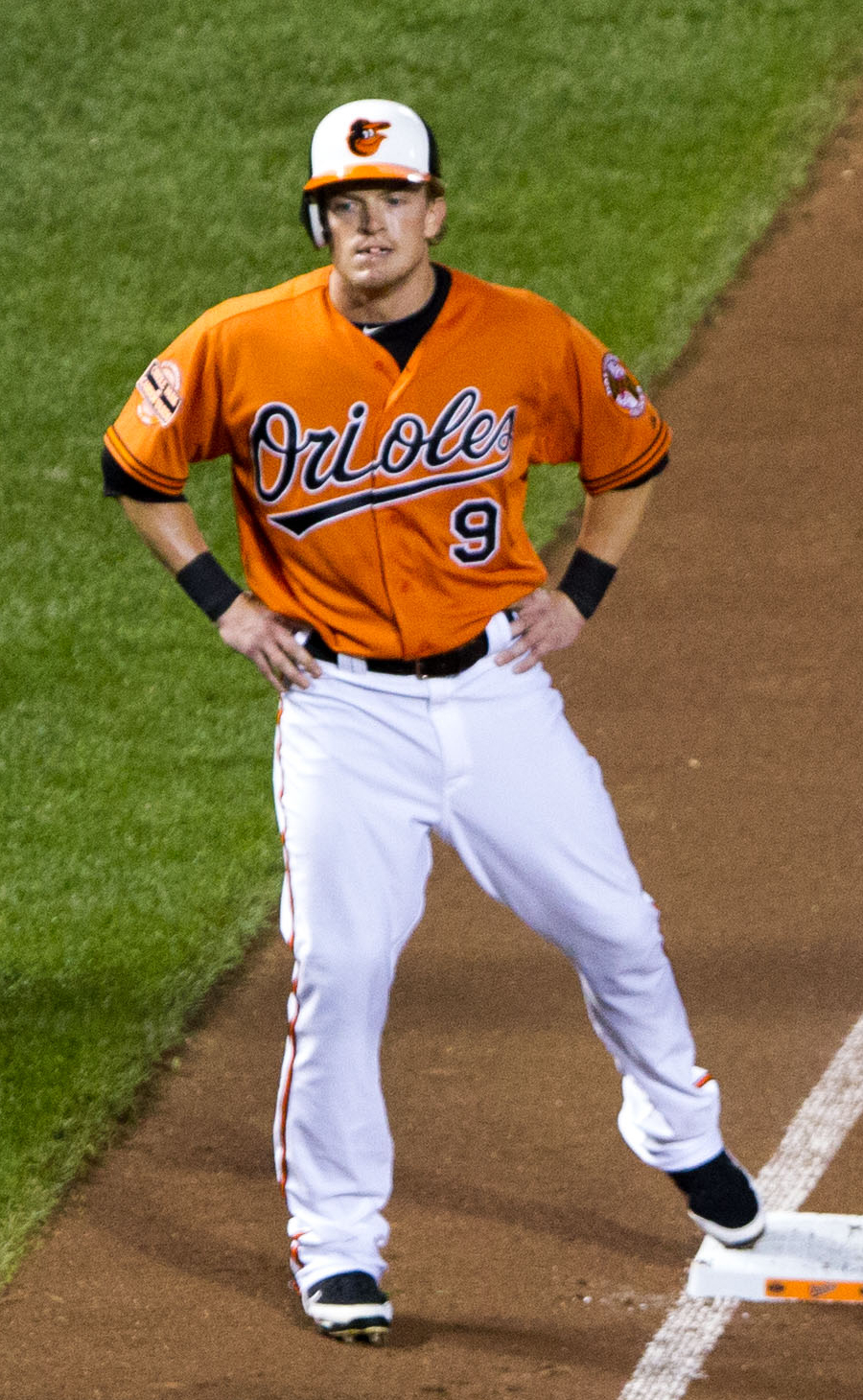
McLouth with the Baltimore Orioles in 2012

=== Baltimore Orioles ===
The Baltimore Orioles signed McLouth to a minor-league contract on June 5, 2012, and he was later called up to the major leagues on August 4. McLouth lined a walk-off single in the ninth inning to score Manny Machado, to defeat the Tampa Bay Rays on September 12. The victory kept the Orioles tied with the New York Yankees for first and increased their wild-card lead over the Rays to three games.

McLouth finished the season with a .268/.342/.435 batting line with 7 home runs, 18 RBI and 12 stolen bases in 236 plate appearances for the Orioles. In the Orioles' 5–1 victory over the Rangers in the first ever AL Wild Card Playoff Game, McLouth went 1-for-4 with two RBI, a stolen base and a run scored. McLouth went 7-for-22 (.318) with one home run, 3 RBI and two stolen bases against the Yankees in the ALDS which the Orioles lost three games to two. The Baltimore Sun later described McLouth as "the only one who brought his bat to the postseason."

On December 5, 2012, the Orioles re-signed McLouth to a one-year agreement for the 2013 season. The deal was worth $2 million, with a potential additional $500,000 for 500 plate appearances. Over the course of the season, McLouth successfully stole 19 consecutive bases before being tagged out by Erick Aybar on June 13, 2013. This was the third longest such streak in franchise history.

McLouth hit the 100th home run of his career on September 24, 2013, off Toronto Blue Jays pitcher Todd Redmond.

=== Washington Nationals ===
On December 12, 2013, McLouth signed a 2-year deal worth $10.75 million with a $6.75 million team option for 2016 with the Washington Nationals. McLouth hurt his shoulder on an attempted diving catch on July 28, and was placed on the 15-day disabled list in August. He was later diagnosed with a torn labrum and underwent surgery on August 21, necessitating a move to the 60-day disabled list. McLouth missed the remainder of the season, and began 2015 on the 15-day disabled list. In June, the Nationals again moved McLouth to the 60-day disabled list. He missed the entire season, and became a free agent in November.

== Personal life ==
McLouth married Lindsay Rolen in February 2009.They, their two sons and two dogs live in Knoxville, Tennessee during the offseason. He is a devout Christian.

McLouth is fluent in Spanish. Pedro Strop, McLouth's teammate in 2012 and 2013, calls him the best American Spanish speaker he has ever heard, while 2013 teammate Alexi Casilla jokingly suggested that McLouth is using a false identity and was actually born in the Dominican Republic. McLouth chose to study Spanish instead of German in high school even though his grandmother was from Germany.
