= J. J. Hardy =

American baseball player (born 1982)

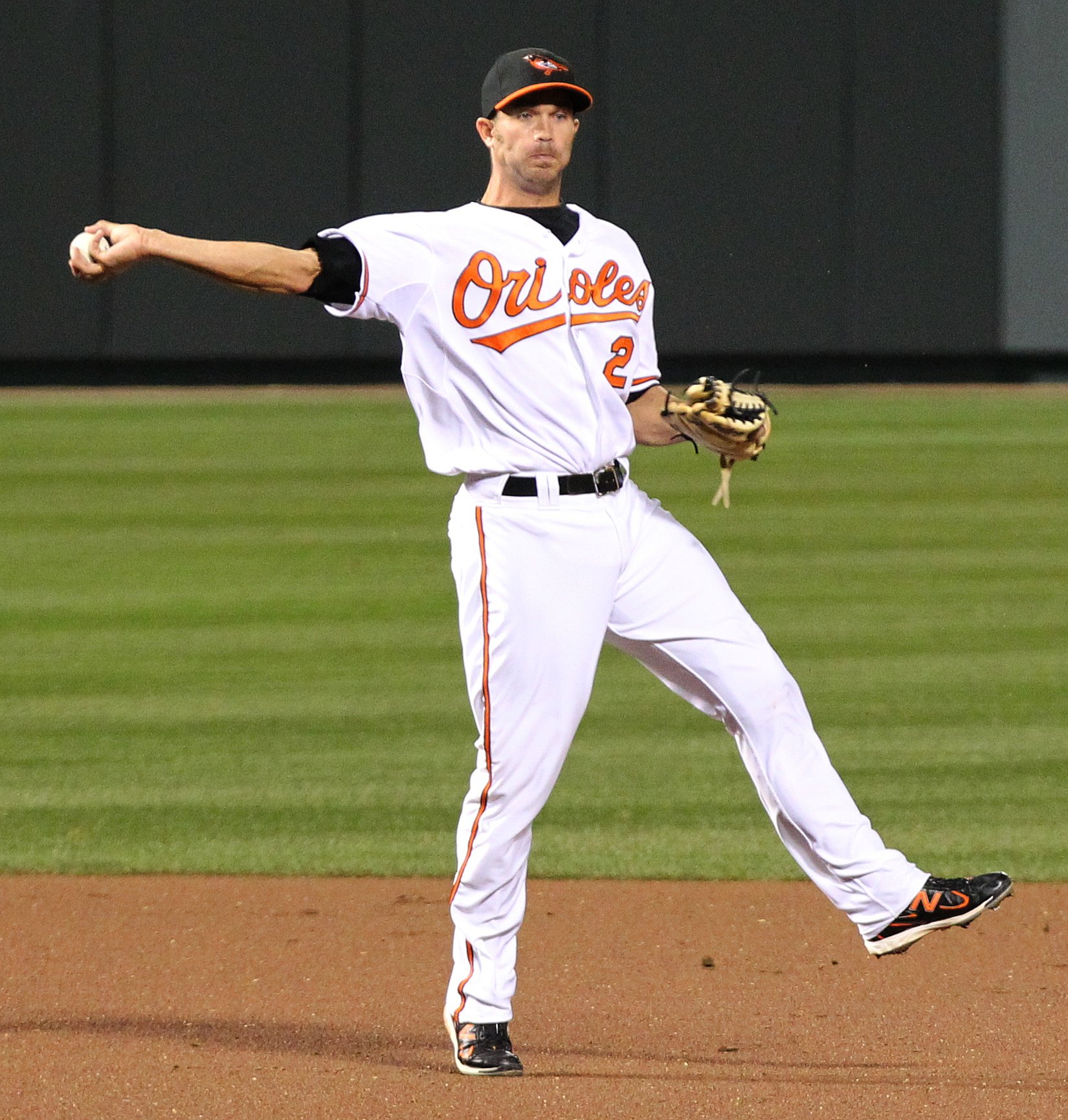
- Hardy with the Orioles in 2011
- Shortstop
- Born: August 19, 1982 (age 44); Tucson, Arizona, U.S.
- Batted: Right Threw: Right

MLB debut
- April 4, 2005, for the Milwaukee Brewers

Last MLB appearance
- October 1, 2017, for the Baltimore Orioles

MLB statistics
- Batting average: .256
- Home runs: 188
- Runs batted in: 688
- Stats at Baseball Reference

Teams
- Milwaukee Brewers (2005–2009); Minnesota Twins (2010); Baltimore Orioles (2011–2017)

Career highlights and awards
- 2× All-Star (2007, 2013); 3× Gold Glove Award (2012–2014); Silver Slugger Award (2013); Milwaukee Brewers Wall of Honor; Baltimore Orioles Hall of Fame
Medals
Men's baseball
Representing United States
World Junior Baseball Championship
Silver medal – second place	2000 Edmonton	Team

James Jerry Hardy (born August 19, 1982) is an American former professional baseball shortstop. He played in Major League Baseball (MLB) for the Milwaukee Brewers, Minnesota Twins, and Baltimore Orioles. Hardy attended Sabino High School in Tanque Verde, Arizona, where he was an All-State selection from 1999 to 2001 and an All-American selection in 2001. Hardy was originally drafted by the Milwaukee Brewers in the second round of the 2001 Major League Baseball draft.

== Early life ==
Hardy played baseball at Sabino High School in Arizona, and was captain of the "Sabercats" baseball team. He was an All-State Selection in 1999, 2000, and 2001, and was All-American in 2001. Also in 2001, he was a member of the U.S. Junior National team, which won the silver medal in Edmonton, Alberta, Canada.

== Baseball career ==
=== Milwaukee Brewers ===
He was drafted by the Milwaukee Brewers during the second round of the 2001 draft. In 2003, he played for the U.S. Olympic Qualifying team. He participated in MLB All-Star Futures Game in 2003. Hardy suffered a dislocated shoulder and a torn labrum in 2004 in the minor leagues and sat out the year.

==== 2005 ====
He went into spring training in 2005 as the frontrunner to win the starting shortstop job. Although he got off to a very slow start, Hardy finished strong and ended the year with a .247 batting average, 9 home runs and 50 RBIs. Hardy committed only 10 errors in the field, but also had the lowest range factor of all major league shortstops (3.76).

==== 2006 ====
On May 16, 2006, Hardy slid into Philadelphia Phillies catcher Sal Fasano at home plate trying to score and badly injured his ankle when Fasano attempted to block the plate. X-rays revealed a severe sprain of the ankle, and he was placed on the 15-day disabled list. Hardy recovered from the sprain, but constantly had trouble with an ankle tendon that kept popping in and out of place. On July 18, the Brewers announced that Hardy would have season-ending surgery on his ankle, performed by team physician Dr. William Raasch. Hardy finished the year with an average of .242 with 5 home runs and 14 RBI.

==== 2007 ====
By June 27, 2007, Hardy had already doubled his career home run total. He ended up batting .277 with 26 home runs, and 80 RBIs. He was selected to play as a reserve in the 2007 Major League Baseball All-Star Game, held in San Francisco. He played in the ninth inning and was walked on his first and only plate appearance.

==== 2008 ====
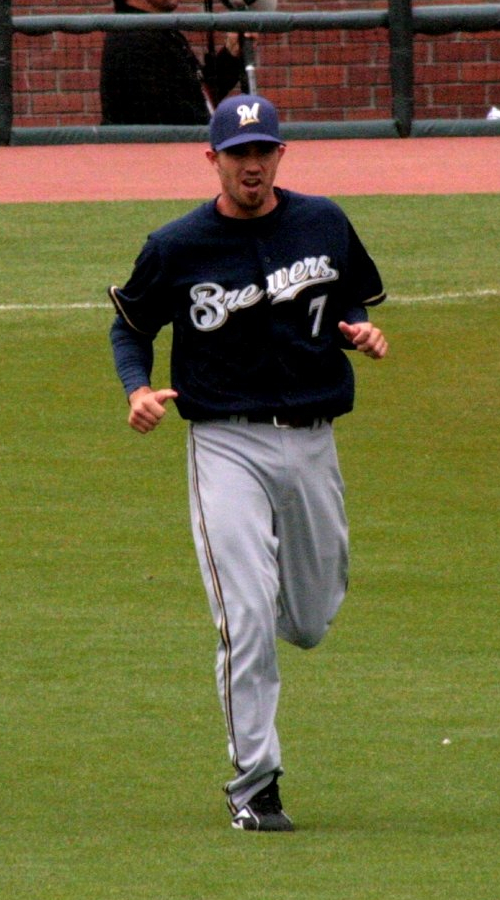
J. J. Hardy during his tenure with the Milwaukee Brewers in 2008.

As of the end of the 2008 season, Hardy was batting .283, with 2 stolen bases, 24 home runs, and 74 RBI. He had a 16-game hitting streak, which was broken on July 5 with a sacrifice bunt in order to aid the Brewers in defeating the Pittsburgh Pirates. For the week of July 7, he was the National League Player of the Week.

==== 2009 ====
Hardy was re-signed by the Brewers to a one-year, $4.65 million contract. After a low-performing season through July, he was optioned to the Triple-A Nashville Sounds on August 12. His line-drive rate had declined for five consecutive seasons prior to his demotion. He was recalled on September 1 and finished the season batting .229 with 11 home runs and 47 RBI.

=== Minnesota Twins ===
On November 6, 2009, Hardy was traded from the Brewers to the Minnesota Twins in exchange for outfielder Carlos Gómez. He spent some time on the disabled list during the course of the 2010 season, but did end up playing over 100 games for the Twins and hit .268 for the season.

=== Baltimore Orioles ===
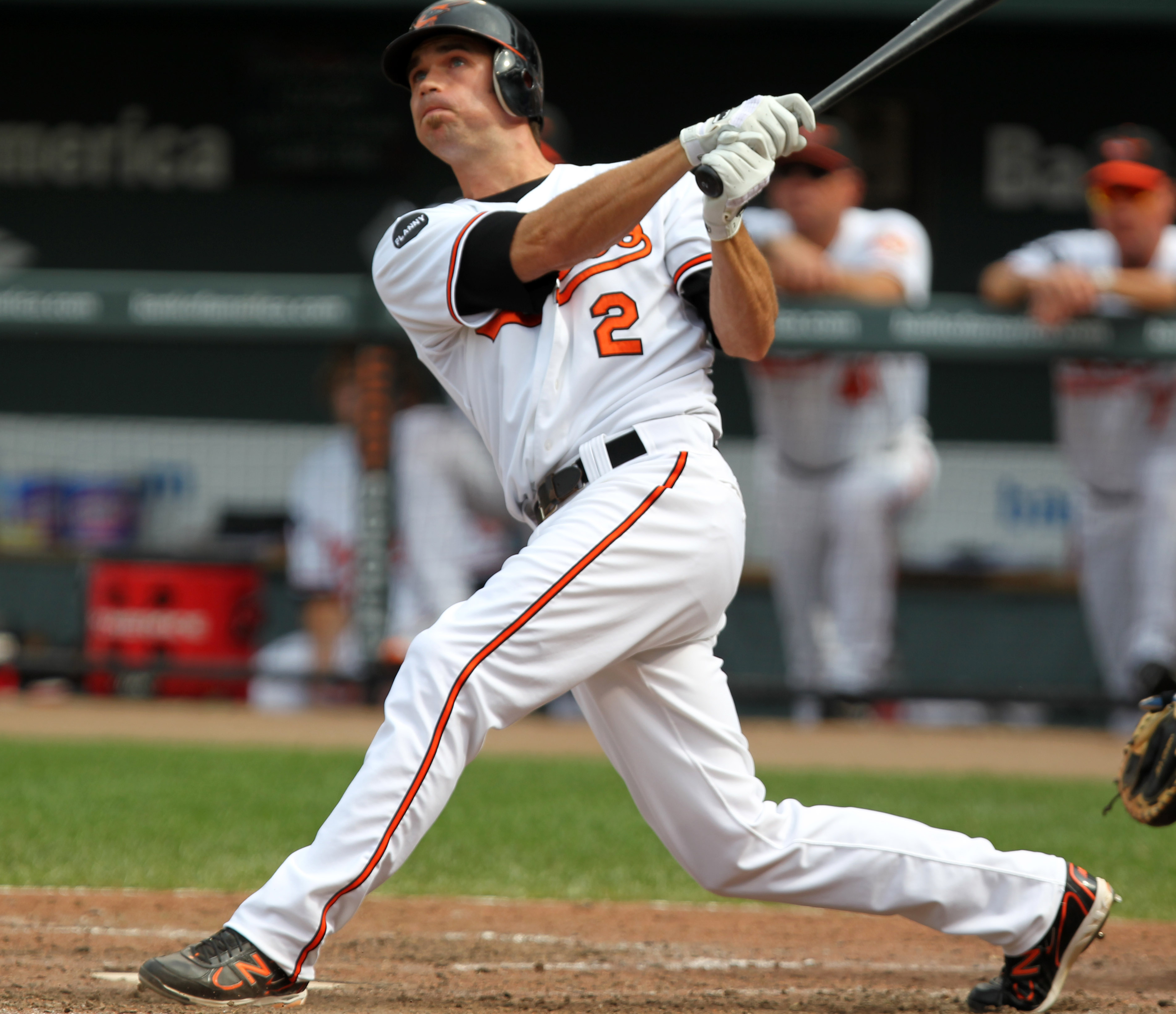
J.J. Hardy batting for the Orioles

On December 9, 2010, Hardy was traded to the Baltimore Orioles from the Twins, along with utility infielder Brendan Harris and $500,000, for minor league pitchers Brett Jacobson and Jim Hoey.

==== 2011 ====
Hardy had a career resurgence and had a strong 2011 campaign. On July 16, 2011, Hardy agreed on a three-year deal to remain with the Orioles through 2014. Hardy finished the season with 30 home runs and 80 RBI. He also hit .269.

==== 2012 ====
Hardy won his first Gold Glove in 2012 finishing with a .992 fielding percentage, 68 RBIs, 22 home runs, and a .238 batting average. He helped the Orioles to their first MLB postseason berth since 1997 with the second MLB Wild Card Game spot. The Orioles won the one-game playoff, but lost in the 2012 ALDS to the New York Yankees.

==== 2013 ====
In 2013, Hardy won his second Gold Glove Award and his first Silver Slugger award as the best offensive player at his position. His teammates, third baseman Manny Machado and center fielder Adam Jones, also won 2013 Gold Glove Awards.

From 2011 to 2013, his 77 home runs led all major league shortstops.

==== 2014 ====
In 2014, Hardy battled back injuries and spent time on the DL during the beginning of the season. 2014 also showed a decline in Hardy's power, and he only hit nine homeruns in over 140 games. In the 2014 ALDS, Hardy hit a solo homerun off of Detroit Tigers pitcher Max Scherzer, his first career postseason homerun. Hardy slashed .240/.321/.400 in seven postseason games.

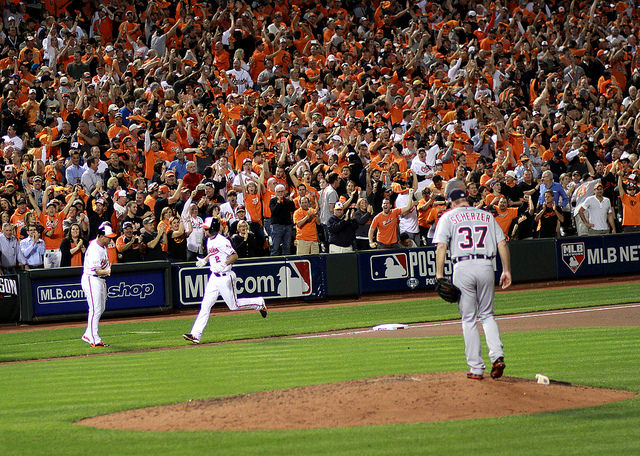
J. J. Hardy rounds third base after hitting a solo home run in Game 1 of the 2014 American League Division Series.

On October 9, 2014, Hardy agreed to a 3-year, $40 million extension with the Orioles.

On November 4, 2014, Hardy won his third consecutive Gold Glove Award for a shortstop. With this award, he passed Orioles great Cal Ripken Jr. for the second-most Gold Gloves won by an Orioles shortstop. He trails Mark Belanger who won eight of these awards.

==== 2015 ====
Hardy spent the first month of the 2015 season on the DL. He made his season debut on May 7 against the New York Yankees. In his fourth game back, Hardy went 2-for-4 and hit his first home run of the season.

On July 17, Hardy started a consecutive games hit streak. On July 29, he extended the hit streak to twelve games with a solo homerun. At that point in the streak, he was 13-for-42 (.310), with two homeruns, seven RBIs, and thirteen runs scored. Hardy extended the streak to thirteen with a 2-out single in the sixth inning the next night against the Tigers. On August 2, his streak ended at 15 games after he did not have a hit in a game against the Tigers. During the 15 games, Hardy collected 16 hits (.291 BAA), with two doubles, two homers, seven RBIs, and was walked twice. He raised his season batting average from .226 up to .240 during the stretch.

Hardy finished 2015, a down year for him, with a batting average of .219 (90 hits), 8 homeruns, and 37 RBIs. His defense, however, was solid, as he only committed three errors in 114 games (994 2/3 innings) and 445 total chances. He turned 57 double plays, while also having a .993 fielding percentage with a range factor of 3.88.

==== 2016 ====
After a disappointing 2015 season in which Hardy was plagued with injuries, he hoped to come back healthy for the 2016 season. He entered the second year of his three-year contract. On April 12, Hardy homered twice in one game and drove in five runs in a 9–5 victory over the Boston Red Sox, which helped the Orioles improve to a franchise-best 7-0 record at the time. On May 1, Hardy fouled a ball off of his foot and was later removed from the game. He later got x-rays on his foot and was placed on the 15-day DL.

On August 18, Hardy hit his 100th career home run as an Oriole in a game where he had three hits and two home runs. His 100th homer gave him sole possession of 2nd place on the Orioles all-time list for home runs as a shortstop, behind Oriole legend Cal Ripken Jr. who had 345 as a shortstop. It was Hardy's second multi-homer game of the year. On August 22, Hardy picked up his 1,400th career hit. Hardy hit a three-run home run on September 13 against the Red Sox, giving him his 256th extra-base hit as an Oriole, tying him for Rick Dempsey for 25th most in team history. He also tied teammate Manny Machado for 25th on the all-time Orioles home run list.

Hardy finished the season with a .269/.309/.407 slash with a .716 OPS. He collected 38 extra-base hits while driving in 48 runs. He went 0-for-4 in a Wild Card Game loss to the AL East rival Toronto Blue Jays.

==== 2017 ====
Hardy entered 2017 healthy and collected his first hit of the season on April 7. On April 12, he surpassed former teammate Matt Wieters on the Orioles all-time hit list and moved into 40th place. On April 16, he moved into 49th place for most runs scored in franchise history. He also tied Wieters for 38th on the all-time franchise leader board for career doubles. On April 20, he surpassed Wieters on the franchise leader board for career doubles with his 158th with the Orioles.

On June 18, Hardy was struck on the wrist by a 94 mph fastball from St. Louis Cardinals pitcher Lance Lynn. It confirmed the next day that he had suffered a broken wrist and was placed on the 10-Day DL. He was moved to the 60-Day DL later in the year before returning to the Orioles in early September. He assumed the role of bench player after the emergence of Tim Beckham, who the Orioles had traded for earlier in the season. On September 24, the final home game of the year for the Orioles, Hardy collected two hits, including a homer, and received three standing ovations from the Orioles crowd in what was his last game as an Oriole at Camden Yards. On November 3, the Orioles declined Hardy's 2018 option.

During his seven year tenure with the Orioles, Hardy played in 889 games, slashing .252/.293/.398 with a .690 OPS. He hit 107 home runs with the club and drove in 385 runs and played a crucial part in the Orioles quest to getting back to the postseason in 2012 for the first time in 14 years. He won three Gold Glove awards, earned a Silver Slugger and made an All-Star Game appearance as a starter in 2013.

== Personal life ==
Hardy's father was a professional tennis player, and his mother was a professional golfer. Hardy's brother, Logan, was with the U.S. Army's 75th Field Artillery Brigade, a unit among the first to Baghdad in March 2003 during Operation Iraqi Freedom.

An avid woodworker, Hardy built a custom Lou Gehrig-themed guitar in collaboration with musician Gary Rossington of Lynyrd Skynyrd, which was donated to a nonprofit organization. The project was documented in a 2019 feature by The Athletic.

Hardy married former University of Arizona softball player Adrienne Acton on December 7, 2013. They have two sons together and reside in Chandler, Arizona, and also own a ranch in Montana.
