= Oak Cliff Film Festival =

Annual film festival in Texas, US

Oak Cliff Film Festival (OCFF)
- Location: Dallas, Texas, United States
- Founded: 2012
- Language: English
- Website: oakclifffilmfestival.com

Oak Cliff Film Festival is an annually held film festival in the Oak Cliff neighborhood of Dallas, Texas. The festival showcases films made by or featuring Texans and people from the surrounding region. Programming spans across genres, with a focus on independent, non-mainstream films, both feature-length and shorts, narrative and documentary.

== About ==
Oak Cliff Film Festival (OCFF) focuses on programming experimental, non-traditional, and low-budget independent cinema otherwise not elevated or programmed by more conventional mainstream festivals. Events at the festival include drive-in movies, live music accompaniment of silent films, newly-remastered older films, and Texas/Dallas premieres.

OCFF has partnered with the Austin Film Society, filmmaker David Lowery, and Tim Headington’s production company Ley Line Entertainment to offer grant funding for emergent filmmakers in North Texas. This initiative included the North Texas Pioneer Film Grant of $30,000, aimed specifically at promoting filmmakers from the Dallas-Fort Worth area with underrepresented perspectives.

OCFF also hosts student workshops that address various aspects of filmmaking including writing, producing, directing, and post-production.

== History ==
The inaugural Oak Cliff Film Festival (OCFF) took place in 2012 from June 14–17. The festival was founded by four independent filmmakers—Barak Epstein, Eric Steele, Adam Donaghey, and Jason Reimer—who were interested in fostering the film community in Dallas and the surrounding area. The four initial founders had purchased the historic Texas Theatre cinema in 2010 and continue to use this venue as the primary venue for the festival.

Some years of the festival have included screenings and events hosted in different venues across Dallas including Kessler Theater, Bishop Arts Theatre Center, Belmont Hotel, the Dallas Zoo, Oil and Cotton, Turner House, and El Sibil.

The 3-4-day festival continues to be organized by and receive financial support from the Oak Cliff Film Society.

== Awards ==
The Oak Cliff Film Festival announces jury awards each year.

=== 2012 ===
The narrative features jury included Bryan Poysner and Dennis Bishop. The documentary features jury included Bradley Beesley and David Hartstein. The shorts juries included Daniel Laabs, Steve Norwood, Eric Jewel, Cynthia Mulcahy, Mike Mazurek, Frank Mosley, and Ya’Ke Smith. The music video jury included Audra Schroeder and Pete Freedman.

2012 Oak Cliff Film Festival Awards
Category	Film title	Director(s)
Best Narrative Feature	The Comedy	Rich Alverson
Best Documentary Feature	Jeff	Chris James Thompson
Best Narrative Short	What Happens When Robert Leaves the Room	Zack Godshall
Best Student Short	My Lymphoma Year	Tony Wynn
Best Community Short	Odds or Evens	Jay Gormley
Best Music Video	Mindspider's Wait for Us	
Best Cinema 16 Short	Brute Force	Ben Steinbauer

=== 2013 ===
The OCFF 2013 narrative features jury were Kim Yutani, A.A. Dowd, and Steve Dollar. The documentary features jury David Hartstein, Sam Douglas, and Peter Simek. The shorts juries included Clay Liford, Dennis Bishop, Cynthia Mulcahy, Bart Weiss, and Carolyn Macartney.

2013 Oak Cliff Film Festival Awards
Category	Film title	Director(s)
Best Narrative Feature	Congratulations!	Mike Brune
Special Jury Prize for Acting in a Narrative Feature	Anna Margaret Hollyman in White Reindeer	Zach Clark
Best Documentary Feature	Medora	Davy Rothbart; Andrew Cohn
Best Narrative Short	Social Butterfly	Lauren Wolkstein
Honorable Mention for Narrative Short	The Chair	Grainger David
Best Documentary Short	You Can't Always Get What You Want	Scott Calonico
Honorable Mention for Documentary Short	Slomo	Joshua Izenberg
Special Jury Prize for Animated Short	Feral	Daniel Sousa
Special Jury Prize for Experimental Short	Irish Folk Furniture	Tony Donaghue
Best Student Short	Undocumented Dreams	Sara Masetti
Honorable Mention for Student Short	GBFF	Atheena Frizzell

=== 2014 ===
Jury members in 2014 were Chase Whale, Zach Clark, James M. Johnston, Matt Grady, Peter Simek, Melina McKinnon Cain, Tom Aberg, Mike Morris, Clay Liford, Tom Anderson, Barton Weiss, Eugene Martin.

2014 Oak Cliff Film Festival Awards
Category	Film title	Director(s)
Special Jury Award Narrative Feature	Limo Ride	Gideon Kennedy; Marcus Rosentrater
Grand Jury Award Narrative Feature	Wild Canaries	Lawrence Levine
Special Jury Award Documentary Feature	Fight Church	Daniel Junge; Bryan Storkel
Grand Jury Award Documentary Feature	Yakona	Anlo Sepulveda; Paul Collins
Special Jury Award Narrative Short	Rat Pack Rat	Todd Rohal
Grand Jury Award Narrative Short	SEND	Peter Vack
Special Jury Award Documentary Short	The Silly Bastard Next to the Bed	Scott Calonico
Grand Jury Award Documentary Short	The Man Without Words	Zach Godshall
Special Jury Award Student Short	camchat	Blake Pruitt
Grand Jury Award Student Short	Housekeeping	Catherine Licata

=== 2015 ===
2015 jury members were Augustine Frizzell, Christine Gaines, Norry Nivens, Liz Franke, Laure Neitzel, Joe Dishner, Casey Gooden, Cameron Bruce Nelson, Blair Rowan, and Barton Weiss.

2015 Oak Cliff Film Festival Awards
Category	Film title	Director(s)
Best Narrative Feature	Christmas, Again	Charles Poekel
Special Jury Prize Mention Narrative Feature	Funny Bunny	Alison Bagnall
Best Documentary Feature	20 Years of Madness	Jerry White, Jr.
Special Jury Mention Documentary Feature	Danny Says	Brendan Toller
Best Narrative Short	Blissful Banquet	Harrison Atkins
Honorable Mention Narrative Short	Son	Judd Myers
Best Documentary Short	Unmappable	Diane Hodson; Jasmine Luoma
Honorable Mention Documentary Short	Pattern for Survival	Kelly Sears
Best Student Short	Leaves on Trees	Nathan Duncan

=== 2016 ===
Jurors in 2016 were Aaron Hillis, David Lowery, Michael Tully, Holly Herrick, Richard Matson, Matt Grady, James Johnston, Joe Dishner, Geoff Marslet, Bart Weiss, Derek Kompare, Chase Whale, Jerry White, and Kerry Navarro.

2016 Oak Cliff Film Festival Awards
Category	Film title	Director(s)
Grand Jury Prize Narrative Feature	Little Sister	Zach Clark
Special Jury Prize for Best Performance	Tomas Pais for Hunky Dory	Michael Curtis Johnson
Grand Jury Prize Documentary Feature	Contemporary Color	Ross Brothers
Grand Jury Prize Narrative Short	Worldwide Woven Bodies	Truls Krane Meby
Special Jury Prize for Outstanding Performance in a Narrative Short	Lindsey Pulcipher for 1985	Yen Tan
Honorable Mention Midnight Narrative Short	Paranormal Idiot	Tom Bardnt
Honorable Mention for Most Totally Effed Up and Impossible to Forget Narrative Short	Gwilliam	Brian Lanano
Grand Jury Prize Documentary Short	The Dog	Drea Cooper; Zackary Canepari
Honorable Mention Documentary Short	The Boatman	Zack Godshall
Grand Jury Prize Student Short	Middle Witch	Amanda Gotera
Special Jury Prize for Cinematic Excellence in Student Shorts	Florence	Caleb Kuntz

=== 2017 ===
Jurors for the 2017 Oak Cliff Film Festival awards were Eric Allen Hatch, Michael Tully, Kyle Greenberg, Sai Selvarajan, Don Lewis, David Sedman, Zach Clark, Aaron Hillis, Joe Dishner, Joe Butler, Jeff Walker, Bart Weiss, and Glenys Quick.

2017 Oak Cliff Film Festival Awards
Category	Film title	Director(s)
Grand Jury Prize Narrative Feature	Barracuda	Julia Halperin; Jason Cortlund
Grand Jury Prize Documentary Feature	True Conviction	Jamie Meltzer
Special Jury Prize for Visual Portraiture	World Without End	Jem Cohen
Grand Jury Prize Narrative Short	Pregnant	Joseph Sackett
Grand Jury Prize Documentary Short	Polaroid Job	Mike Plante
Special Jury Prize Documentary Short	Richard Twice	Matthew Salton
Grand Jury Prize Student Short	South Texas Cow Punk	Carlo Nasisse

=== 2018 ===
Aaron Hillis, Dan Brawley, and Gabe Klinger juried the Narrative Feature nominees. Betsey Holt, Judd Myers, and Andrew Logan juried the Narrative Short nominees. Jennifer Samani, Joshua Butler, and Neil Creque Williams juried the Documentary Feature nominees. Linda Eddy, Andy Streitfeld, and Ardis Campbell juried the Documentary Shorts nominees. Bart Weiss, Lizette Barrera, and Eric Jewell juried the Student Short nominees.

2018 Oak Cliff Film Festival Awards
Category	Film title	Director(s)
Best Narrative Feature	I Am Not a Witch	Rungano Nyoni
Best Documentary Feature	Milford Graves Full Mantis	Jake Meginsky; Neil Young
Best Narrative Short	Nevada	Emily Ann Hoffman
Best Documentary Short	Still Processing	Sophy Romvari
Best Student Short	Pentecost	Katherine Propper
Special Jury Prize for Narrative Feature	Birds Without Feathers	Wendy McColm

=== 2021 ===
2021 Oak Cliff Film Festival Awards
Category	Film title	Director(s)
Best Narrative Feature	El Planeta	Amalia Ulman
Best Documentary Feature	Off the Road	José Permar
Best Narrative Short	Doretha's Blues	Channing Godfrey Peoples
Best Documentary Short	Still Processing	Sophy Romvari
Best Student Short	Michelle	Kenya Gillespie
Special Jury Award for Breakthrough Performance	We're All Going to the World's Fair	Jane Schoenbrun
Special Jury Mention Documentary Short	Trade Center	Adam Baran
Special Jury Mention Documentary Feature	Poly Styrene: I Am a Cliché	Celeste Bell; Paul Sng
Special Jury Mention Student Short	El Fantasma	Arturo R. Jiménez

=== 2022 ===
2022 Oak Cliff Film Festival Awards
Category	Film title	Director(s)
Best Narrative Feature	Linoleum	Colin West
Narrative Feature Special Jury Mention	Three Tidy Tigers Tied a Tie Tighter	Gustavo Vinagre
Best Documentary Feature	Meet Me in the Bathroom Special	Will Lovelace; Dylan Southern
Documentary Feature Jury Mention	Sirens	Rita Baghdadi
Best Narrative Short	Peacocking	Zeke Goodman
Narrative Short Special Jury Mention	Executrix	Kati Skelton
Best Documentary Short	Stranger Than Rotterdam With Sarah Driver	Lewie Kloster; Noah Kloster
Documentary Short Special Jury Mention	Deerwoods Deathtrap	James P. Gannon
Best Student Short	Otra Vida: A Celebration of the Immigrant	Anthony Gomez
Student Short Special Jury Mention	#BlackatSMU	Aysia Lane
Crazy Water Awards Craziest Practical Effects	Guts	Chris McInroy
Crazy Water Awards Craziest Sequence	Linoleum	Colin West
Crazy Water Awards Craziest Decision	2nd Chance	Ramin Bahrani

=== 2023 ===
Festival jurors in 2023 were Neal Creque Williams, Bradford Thomason, Merced Eliondo, Kelly Williams, Leigh Steglitz, Linda Eaddy, Amber Ekleberry, Bart Weiss, Claire Dejarnett, Gina Cuomo, Ardis Campbell, Rebekah Louisa Smith, Craig Miller, Marielena Resendiz, and Randall Kramen.

Oak Cliff Film Festival 2023 Awards
Category	Film title	Director(s)
Best Narrative Feature	Molli and Max in the Future	Michael Lukk Litwak
Best Documentary Feature	Long Live My Happy Head	Austen McCowan
Documentary Feature Special Jury Mention	Don't Fall in Love With Yourself	Jon Nix
Best Narrative Short	The Sidewalk Artist	Brandon Rivera; David Velez
Narrative Short Special Jury Mention	Dream Carriers	Esmeralda Hernandez
Best Documentary Short	Breaking Silence	Amy Bench; Annie Silverstein
Documentary Short Special Jury Mention	4DWN	Danny Schmidt
Best Student Short	Comadre	Nicole Chi
Student Short Special Jury Mention	Cats Don't Sleep at Night	Beibei Xu Champagne

=== 2024 ===
Oak Cliff Film Festival 2024 Awards
Category	Film title	Director(s)
Best Narrative Feature	Vulcanizadora	Joel Potrykus
Best Documentary Feature	Swamp Dogg Gets His Pool Painted	Isaac Gale; Ryan Olson
Documentary Feature Special Jury Mention	Ultimate Citizens	Francine Strickwerda
Best Narrative Short	Jedo's Dead	Sara Nimeh
Best Documentary Short	We Clap for Airballs	Sai Selvarajan
Documentary Short Special Jury Mention	Queen vs. Texas	Emil Lozada; Raemonn James
Best Student Short	Hair Care	Fatima Warby
Student Short Special Jury Mention	Recyclos	Jordan Gros
