= 2014 Baltimore Orioles season =

Major League Baseball season

2014 Baltimore Orioles
- American League East champions
- League: American League
- Division: East
- Ballpark: Oriole Park at Camden Yards
- City: Baltimore, Maryland
- Record: 96–66 (.593)
- Divisional place: 1st
- Owners: Peter Angelos
- General managers: Dan Duquette
- Managers: Buck Showalter
- Television: MASN; WJZ-TV (CBS 13) (Gary Thorne, Jim Palmer, Mike Bordick, Jim Hunter)
- Radio: WBAL (AM); Baltimore Orioles Radio Network (Joe Angel, Fred Manfra, Jim Hunter, Dave Johnson)

The 2014 Baltimore Orioles season was the 114th season in franchise history, the 61st in Baltimore, and the 23rd at Oriole Park at Camden Yards. The Birds would finish in first place in the American League East Division and return to the playoffs for the second time in three seasons, claiming their first division championship since 1997. The Orioles swept the Detroit Tigers in the Division Series and advanced to the AL Championship Series, where they were swept by the Kansas City Royals.

New Oriole Nelson Cruz led the majors in home runs with 40; following Chris Davis' 2013 title this was the first time in franchise history two Orioles (or Browns) had won back-to-back home run titles. As a team the Birds hit 211 home runs to lead baseball, their third consecutive 200-homer season (another franchise first).

== Preceding offseason ==
Entering the offseason, the Orioles had 11 arbitration eligible players, three contract options, and several outgoing free agents. They looked to make additions to their starting rotation, to add a "big bat", as well as to improve their bullpen, which was strong in 2012, but "average" in 2013.

=== Outgoing free agents ===
- LHP Tsuyoshi Wada signed a minor league contract with invitation to spring training with Chicago Cubs on December 19, 2013
- 3B/1B Wilson Betemit – signed a minor league contract with invitation to spring training with Tampa Bay Rays on February 6, 2014
- IF Alexi Casilla – re-signed with Baltimore Orioles to a minor league contract with an invitation to spring training on January 10, 2014
- RHP Zach Clark – re-signed with Orioles to a minor league contract with an invitation to spring training on January 7, 2014
- OF Chris Dickerson – signed a minor league contract with an invitation to spring training with Pittsburgh Pirates on January 6, 2014
- RHP Scott Feldman – signed a 3-year, US$30,000,000 contract with Houston Astros on December 6, 2013
- RHP Jason Hammel – signed a 1-year, US$6,000,000 contract with Chicago Cubs on January 31, 2014
- 1B Dan Johnson – signed a minor league contract with an invitation to spring training with Toronto Blue Jays on November 15, 2013
- IF Alex Liddi – signed a minor league contract with an invitation to spring training with Chicago White Sox on November 18, 2013
- OF Nate McLouth – signed a 2-year, US$10,750,000 contract with a third-year club option with Washington Nationals on December 12, 2013
- OF Michael Morse – signed a 1-year, US$6,000,000 contract with San Francisco Giants on December 17, 2013
- IF Yamaico Navarro – signed a minor league contract with an invitation to spring training with New York Yankees on November 19, 2013
- OF Jason Pridie – signed a minor league contract with an invitation to spring training with Colorado Rockies on December 18, 2013
- RHP Jon Rauch – signed a minor league contract with an invitation to spring training with Kansas City Royals on January 23, 2014
- 2B Brian Roberts – signed a 1-year, US$2,000,000 contract with New York Yankees on January 14, 2014 (Roberts was the longest tenured member of the Baltimore Orioles prior to his departure)
- RHP Francisco Rodríguez – signed a 1-year, US$3,250,000 contract with Milwaukee Brewers on February 7, 2014
- C Chris Snyder – signed a minor league contract with an invitation to spring training with Washington Nationals on December 20, 2013
- C Taylor Teagarden – signed a minor league contract with an invitation to spring training with New York Mets on January 6, 2014

=== Incoming free agents ===
- RHP Ryan Webb – signed a 2-year, $4.5 million free agent contract on December 10, 2013
- OF Quintin Berry – signed a minor-league contract with an invitation to spring training on January 3, 2014 (Contract selected on September 2, 2014)
- OF Delmon Young – signed a minor-league contract with an invitation to spring training on January 13, 2014 (Contract selected on March 30, 2014)
- SS Alex González – signed a minor-league contract with an invitation to spring training on January 31, 2014
- RHP Evan Meek – signed a minor-league contract with an invitation to spring training on February 5, 2014 (Contract selected on March 30, 2014)
- RHP Ubaldo Jiménez – Signed a 4-year, $50 million free agent contract on February 14, 2014
- OF Nelson Cruz – Signed a 1-year, $8 million free agent contract on February 24, 2014

=== Preseason trades ===
- RHP Brad Brach – acquired from the San Diego Padres in trade for RHP Devin Jones on November 25, 2013
- 2B Jemile Weeks – acquired from the Oakland Athletics along with C David Freitas in a trade for RHP Jim Johnson on December 3, 2013
- OF David Lough – acquired from the Kansas City Royals in trade for 3B Danny Valencia on December 18, 2013
- IF Steve Lombardozzi Jr. – acquired from the Detroit Tigers in trade for SS Alex González on March 24, 2014

== Regular season ==
=== March/April ===
On March 31, the Orioles won their 2014 regular season opener against the Boston Red Sox, but then proceeded to lose their next four games. After a full week and a 4–2 loss to the New York Yankees, the Orioles were in last place in the American League East and 3 games below .500. Orioles All-Star 3rd baseman Manny Machado, still recovering from off-season surgery, did not play in any games for the Orioles during the month of April; but Orioles catcher Matt Wieters got off to an uncharacteristically fast start hitting .338 with 4 home runs and 15 RBIs. The Orioles finished the month with 11 wins and 12 losses.

=== May ===
Tommy Hunter started the season as the Orioles closer and was successful in 11 of his 12 save opportunities, but he blew 2 consecutive saves on May 10 and 13 and then was placed on the 15-day disabled list. On May 11, the Orioles placed catcher Matt Wieters on the disabled list. Wieters was hitting over .300 and would ultimately be lost to the team for the entire season. The Orioles finished May with 15 wins and 15 losses but moved up to 3rd place in the American League East. The one bright spot in an otherwise mediocre April–May was the torrid hitting of new Oriole Nelson Cruz; by May 31 Cruz led all of MLB with a staggering 20 home runs and 51 runs batted in.

=== June ===
On June 6, the Orioles lost to the Oakland Athletics, 4–3 in 11 innings, dropping them 6 1/2 games out of first place. It would be the farthest out of first that the Orioles would be all season. Adam Jones batted .348 with nine homers and 20 RBIs in June. Utility player Steve Pearce, who had appeared in only 3 games for the Orioles in April, batted .361 in June with 5 home runs and 13 RBI's. The Birds finished the month with 16 wins and 12 losses, trailing the first-place Blue Jays by one game.

=== July ===
On Saturday July 5, the Orioles split a double-header with the Boston Red Sox and moved into sole possession of first place in the American League East and would remain in first place for the rest of the season. By the All-Star break, the Orioles had increased their lead to 4 games and three Oriole players were voted by the fans to the American League squad: Matt Weiters (his third), Adam Jones (his fourth) and Nelson Cruz (his third). This marked the first time in club history that three Orioles were voted onto the American League squad in consecutive years. By the end of the month, new Oriole closer Zach Britton had 11 saves for the month and the Orioles led the American League East by 1.5 games.

=== August ===
On August 9, reserve catcher Caleb Joseph hit a home run in the Orioles' 10–3 win over the St. Louis Cardinals; making him the first Orioles catcher to homer in 5 consecutive games. Orioles 3rd baseman Machado injured his right knee on an awkward swing against the New York Yankees on August 11. After going on the disabled list and trying to rest his knee, he decided to have his knee surgically repaired thus ending his season. Oriole shortstop J. J. Hardy batted .322 for the month with 5 homeruns and 18 RBI's. First baseman Chris Davis filled in for Machado at third and hit 7 homeruns with 17 rbi's for the month. The Orioles ended the month of August with four consecutive wins; increasing their lead in the American League East to 9 full games over the second place Yankees.

=== September ===
The Orioles started the month with a 6–4 loss to the Minnesota Twins but still maintained an 8 1/2 game lead over the second place Yankees. Newly acquired outfielder Alejandro De Aza also started the month with the Orioles and before September was over he would hit 3 triples, 3 home runs, drive in 10 runs and bat over .300. On September 7, the Orioles beat the Tampa Bay Rays 7–5; Nelson Cruz went 4-for-5 with two home runs and 7 RBIs. On September 12, Orioles' first baseman Chris Davis was suspended for 25 games for testing positive for amphetamine. Davis claimed he tested positive due to the use of adderall—for which he previous had a "therapeutic use exemption" but did not have for the 2014 season.

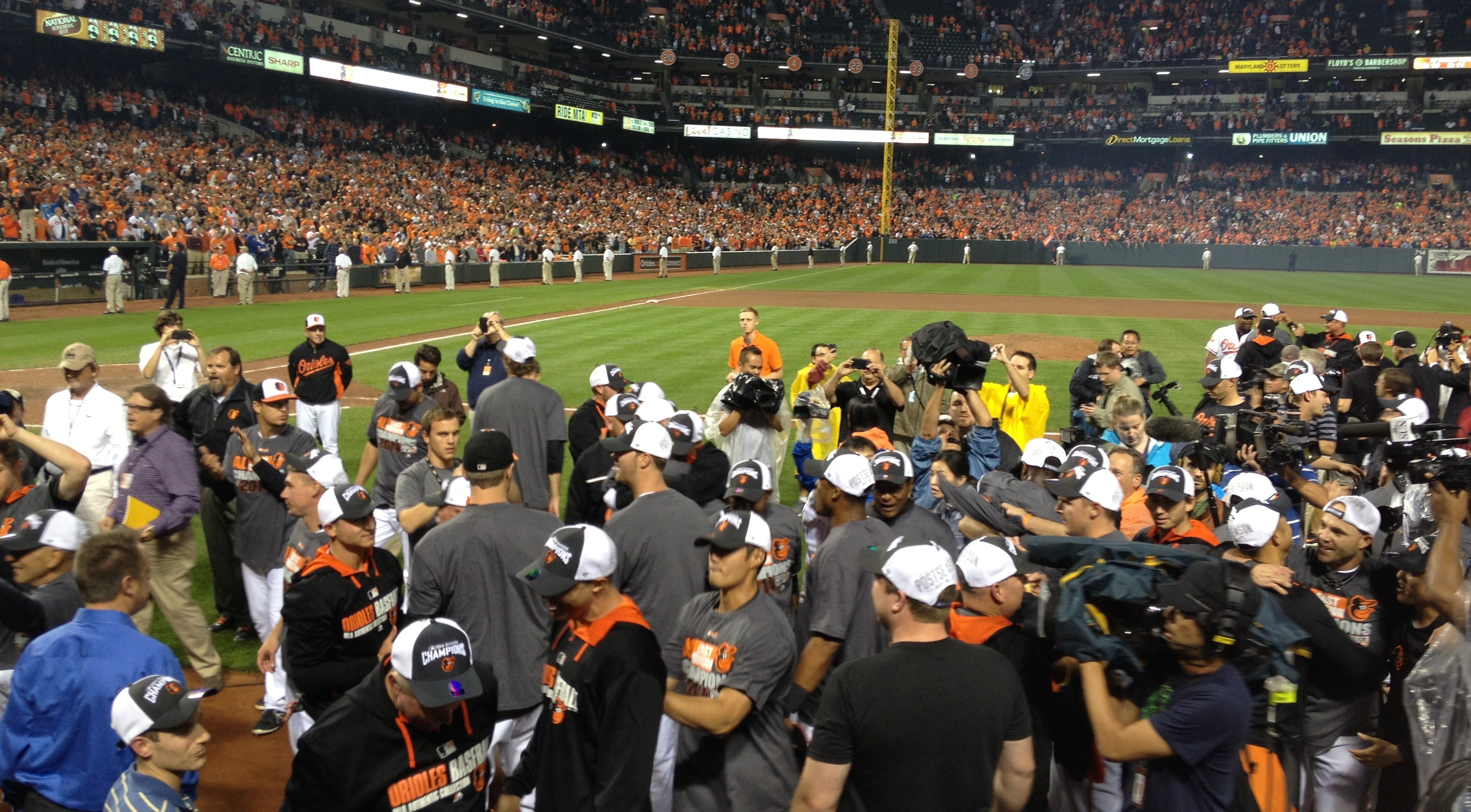
members of the 2014 Baltimore Orioles celebrating at Oriole Park immediately after clinching the American League East title

External videos
- Orioles clinch AL East YouTube video

On Tuesday, September 16, the Orioles clinched the American League East championship by beating the second place Toronto Blue Jays 8–2. The Orioles had not won an American League East title since 1997 and Tuesday marked the first time since 1969 that the Orioles won a division title in front of their fans at home. Steve Pearce, who had replaced Chris Davis at first base, blasted a three-run homerun off Toronto right-hander Drew Hutchison to give the Orioles a 3–1 lead in the first inning. Oriole right-hander Ubaldo Jiménez, who hadn't been in the starting rotation for a month, picked up the win. On September 25, the Orioles gave up a walk off hit to Derek Jeter in his final game at Yankee Stadium. The Orioles finished the season with 211 home runs. 2014 is the third consecutive season the Orioles hit more than 200 home runs and the first time in franchise history that they did it 3 years in a row. The Orioles 401 walks were also the fewest walks as the modern Orioles and their 44 stolen bases were their fewest since 1961.

=== In-season transactions ===
- RHP Preston Guilmet – acquired from Cleveland Indians in trade for 2B Torsten Boss on 4/7/2014
- LF Steve Pearce – released on 4/27/2014
- LF Steve Pearce – signed to a 1-year, $850K free agent contract on 4/29/2014
- C Nick Hundley – acquired from San Diego Padres in trade for LHP Troy Patton on 5/24/2014
- OF Nolan Reimold – claimed off waivers by Toronto Blue Jays on 7/6/2014
- 3B Jimmy Paredes – acquired from Kansas City Royals for cash on 7/24/2014
- LHP Andrew Miller – acquired from Boston Red Sox in trade for LHP Eduardo Rodríguez on 7/31/2014
- OF Alejandro De Aza – acquired from Chicago White Sox in trade for RHP Mark Blackmar and RHP Miguel Chalas on 8/31/2014
- 3B Kelly Johnson and 3B Michael Almanzar – acquired from Boston Red Sox in trade for 2B Jemile Weeks and 2B Ivan De Jesus Jr. on 8/31/2014

=== Injuries etc. ===
- March 31 – May 1: 3B Manny Machado on 15-day disabled list retroactive to 3/21 (offseason left knee surgery)
- March 31 – May 1: LHP Troy Patton on restricted list (25-game suspension for amphetamine use imposed 12/20/2013)
- April 7 – OF Nolan Reimold on 60-day disabled list (July 2013 back surgery)
- April 26 – May 11: 1B Chris Davis on 15-day disabled list (oblique strain)
- May 11 – August 13: C Matt Wieters on 15-day disabled list (right elbow strain)
- May 22 – June 8: RHP Tommy Hunter on 15-day disabled list (left groin strain)
- May 25 – May 27: 1B Chris Davis on paternity list
- May 31 – June 17: RHP Miguel González on 15-day disabled list (oblique strain)
- June 2 – June 9: RHP Johan Santana on 15-day disabled list (April 2013 shoulder surgery)
- June 9 – RHP Johan Santana transferred from the 15-day to the 60-day disabled list
- June 17 – C Matt Wieters underwent Tommy John surgery (out for season)
- June 22 – July 21 RHP Bud Norris on 15-day disabled list (right groin strain)
- June 30 – July 5: 3B Manny Machado on restricted list (5-game suspension for bat throwing)
- July 8 – August 9: RHP Ubaldo Jiménez on 15-day disabled list (right ankle sprain)
- August 12 – September 2: 3B Manny Machado on 15-day disabled list (right knee sprain)
- August 13: C Matt Wieters transferred from 15-day to 60-day disabled list
- August 27: 3B Manny Machado underwent right knee surgery (out for season)
- September 2: 3B Manny Machado transferred from 15-day to 60-day disabled list
- September 12 – 1B Chris Davis on restricted list (25-game suspension for amphetamine use)

== Season standings ==
=== American League East ===
AL East
Team	W	L	Pct.	GB	Home	Road
Baltimore Orioles	96	66	.593	—	50‍–‍31	46‍–‍35
New York Yankees	84	78	.519	12	43‍–‍38	41‍–‍40
Toronto Blue Jays	83	79	.512	13	46‍–‍35	37‍–‍44
Tampa Bay Rays	77	85	.475	19	36‍–‍45	41‍–‍40
Boston Red Sox	71	91	.438	25	34‍–‍47	37‍–‍44

=== Record vs. opponents ===
2014 American League record Source: MLB Standings Grid – 2014
Team	BAL	BOS	CWS	CLE	DET	HOU	KC	LAA	MIN	NYY	OAK	SEA	TB	TEX	TOR	NL
Baltimore	—	11–8	5–1	3–4	1–5	4–3	3–4	4–2	4–3	13–6	2–4	5–2	12–7	6–1	11–8	12–8
Boston	8–11	—	4–3	2–5	1–5	4–3	6–1	2–5	4–2	7–12	3–4	1–5	9–10	4–2	7–12	9–11
Chicago	1–5	3–4	—	9–10	9–10	3–3	6–13	1–5	9–10	2–5	4–3	3–4	5–2	2–4	5–2	11–9
Cleveland	4–3	5–2	10–9	—	8–11	5–2	10–9	2–5	11–8	4–3	2–4	2–4	4–2	6–1	2–4	10–10
Detroit	5–1	5–1	10–9	11–8	—	4–3	13–6	3–4	9–10	3–4	5–2	2–4	3–4	4–3	1–5	12–8
Houston	3–4	3–4	3–3	2–5	3–4	—	3–3	7–12	3–3	4–2	8–11	9–10	2–5	11–8	4–3	5–15
Kansas City	4–3	1–6	13–6	9–10	6–13	3–3	—	3–3	11–8	4–3	5–2	2–5	4–2	5–1	4–3	15–5
Los Angeles	2–4	5–2	5–1	5–2	4–3	12–7	3–3	—	7–0	2–4	10–9	7–12	5–2	14–5	5–2	12–8
Minnesota	3–4	2–4	10–9	8–11	10–9	3–3	8–11	0–7	—	3–4	1–6	5–2	2–4	2–5	4–2	9–11
New York	6–13	12–7	5–2	3–4	4–3	2–4	3–4	4–2	4–3	—	2–4	3–3	8–11	4–3	11–8	13–7
Oakland	4–2	4–3	3–4	4–2	2–5	11–8	2–5	9–10	6–1	4–2	—	9–10	4–2	9–10	4–3	13–7
Seattle	2–5	5–1	4–3	4–2	4–2	10–9	5–2	12–7	2–5	3–3	10–9	—	4–3	9–10	4–3	9–11
Tampa Bay	7–12	10–9	2–5	2–4	4–3	5–2	2–4	2–5	4–2	11–8	2–4	3–4	—	5–2	8–11	10–10
Texas	1–6	2–4	4–2	1–6	3–4	8–11	1–5	5–14	5–2	3–4	10–9	10–9	2–5	—	2–4	10–10
Toronto	8–11	12–7	2–5	4–2	5–1	3–4	3–4	2–5	2–4	8–11	3–4	3–4	11–8	4–2	—	13–7

== Game log ==
Past games legend
Orioles Win	Orioles Loss	Game postponed	Clinched Playoff Spot*
**Boldface** text denotes an Orioles pitcher
* The codes in larger text are those which will be used most frequently. The codes in smaller text are only used for one game per season and needn't be concerned about in early months (Apr.-Aug.) of the season.

Baltimore Orioles 2014 Season Game Log — Season Record: 96–66 (.593) — Home: 50–31 — Road: 46–35
March/April: 12–12 (.500) — Home: 5–6 — Road: 7–6

#	Date	Opponent	Score	Win	Loss	Save	Stadium	Attendance	Record	Box/ Streak
1	March 31	Red Sox	2–1	**Britton** (1–0)	Lester (0–1)	**Hunter** (1)	Camden Yards	46,685	1–0	W1
2	April 2	Red Sox	2–6	Lackey (1–0)	**Jiménez** (0–1)	—	Camden Yards	25,078	1–1	L1
3	April 3	Red Sox	3–4	Doubront (1–0)	**Chen** (0–1)	Uehara (1)	Camden Yards	20,880	1–2	L2
4	April 4	@ Tigers	4–10	Smyly (1–0)	**González** (0–1)	—	Comerica Park	23,625	1–3	L3
5	April 5	@ Tigers	6–7	Porcello (1–0)	**Norris** (0–1)	Nathan (1)	Comerica Park	32,041	1–4	L4
6	April 6	@ Tigers	3–1	**Tillman** (1–0)	Verlander (0–1)	**Hunter** (2)	Comerica Park	34,261	2–4	W1
7	April 7	@ Yankees	2–4	Kuroda (1–1)	**Jiménez** (0–2)	Kelley (1)	Yankee Stadium	48,142	2–5	L1
8	April 8	@ Yankees	14–5	**Chen** (1–1)	Nova (1–1)	—	Yankee Stadium	35,864	3–5	W1
9	April 9	@ Yankees	5–4	**Matusz** (1–0)	Kelley (0–1)	**Hunter** (3)	Yankee Stadium	39,412	4–5	W2
10	April 11	Blue Jays	0–2	McGowan (1–1)	**Tillman** (1–1)	Santos (4)	Camden Yards	22,327	4–6	L1
11	April 12	Blue Jays	2–1 (12)	**Britton** (2–0)	Redmond (0–1)	—	Camden Yards	30,446	5–6	W1
12	April 13	Blue Jays	3–11	Buehrle (3–0)	**Jiménez** (0–3)	—	Camden Yards	39,281	5–7	L1
13	April 14	Rays	7–1	**Chen** (2–1)	Archer (1–1)	—	Camden Yards	15,799	6–7	W1
−	April 15	Rays	Postponed (rain). Makeup date June 27 as part of doubleheader.							
14	April 16	Rays	3–0	**González** (1–1)	Odorizzi (1–2)	**Hunter** (4)	Camden Yards	22,611	7–7	W2
15	April 18	@ Red Sox	8–4	**Tillman** (2–1)	Lackey (2–2)	**O'Day** (1)	Fenway Park	36,408	8–7	W3
16	April 19	@ Red Sox	2–4	Tazawa (1–0)	**Norris** (0–2)	Uehara (4)	Fenway Park	37,689	8–8	L1
17	April 20	@ Red Sox	5–6	Mujica (1–1)	**Matusz** (1–1)	—	Fenway Park	33,947	8–9	L2
18	April 21	@ Red Sox	7–6	**Chen** (3–1)	Buchholz (0–2)	**Hunter** (5)	Fenway Park	37,513	9–9	W1
19	April 22	@ Blue Jays	3–9	Delabar (2–0)	**Meek** (0–1)	—	Rogers Centre	14,866	9–10	L1
20	April 23	@ Blue Jays	10–8	**Tillman** (3–1)	Redmond (0–2)	**Hunter** (6)	Rogers Centre	15,202	10–10	W1
21	April 24	@ Blue Jays	11–4	**Norris** (1–2)	Cecil (0–1)	—	Rogers Centre	16,283	11–10	W2
22	April 25	Royals	0–5	Ventura (2–1)	**Jiménez** (0–4)		Camden Yards	22,478	11–11	L1
23	April 26	Royals	3–2 (10)	**Britton** (3–0)	Duffy (1–1)	—	Camden Yards	34,941	12–11	W1
24	April 27	Royals	3–9	Shields (3–2)	**González** (1–2)	—	Camden Yards	38,368	12–12	L1
—	April 29	Pirates	Postponed (rain). Makeup date May 1 as part of doubleheader.							
—	April 30	Pirates	Postponed (rain). Makeup date May 1 as part of doubleheader.							

May: 15–15 (.500) — Home: 6–6 — Road: 9–9

#	Date	Opponent	Score	Win	Loss	Save	Stadium	Attendance	Record	Box/ Streak
25	May 1	Pirates	5–1	**Norris** (2–2)	Morton (0–4)	**Hunter** (7)	Camden Yards	—	13–12	W1
26	May 1	Pirates	6–5 (10)	**Hunter** (1–0)	Pimentel (2–1)	—	Camden Yards	28,290	14–12	W2
27	May 2	@ Twins	3–0	**Jiménez** (1–4)	Nolasco (2–3)	**Hunter** (8)	Target Field	24,165	15–12	W3
28	May 3	@ Twins	1–6	Correia (1–3)	**Chen** (3–2)	—	Target Field	25,318	15–13	L1
29	May 4	@ Twins	2–5	Hughes (3–1)	**González** (1–3)	Perkins (7)	Target Field	25,559	15–14	L2
30	May 6	@ Rays	5–3	**O'Day** (1–0)	Peralta (1–2)	**Hunter** (9)	Tropicana Field	11,855	16–14	W1
31	May 7	@ Rays	4–3	**Webb** (1–0)	Gomes (2–2)	**Hunter** (10)	Tropicana Field	11,282	17–14	W2
32	May 8	@ Rays	3–1	**Jiménez** (2–4)	Price (3–3)	**O'Day** (2)	Tropicana Field	11,076	18–14	W3
33	May 9	Astros	4–3	**Chen** (4–2)	Williams (1–2)	**Hunter** (11)	Camden Yards	28,875	19–14	W4
34	May 10	Astros	5–4 (10)	**Webb** (2–0)	Clemens (0–1)	—	Camden Yards	26,264	20–14	W5
35	May 11	Astros	2–5	Cosart (2–3)	**Tillman** (3–2)	Qualls (2)	Camden Yards	45,944	20–15	L1
36	May 12	Tigers	1–4	Porcello (6–1)	**Norris** (2–3)	Nathan (8)	Camden Yards	24,517	20–16	L2
37	May 13	Tigers	1–4	Miller (1–0)	**Hunter** (1–1)	Nathan (9)	Camden Yards	29,950	20–17	L3
38	May 14	Tigers	5–7	Verlander (5–2)	**Gausman** (0–1)	Nathan (10)	Camden Yards	36,727	20–18	L4
39	May 15	@ Royals	2–1	**Chen** (5–2)	Ventura (2–3)	**Britton** (1)	Kauffman Stadium	12,455	21–18	W1
40	May 16	@ Royals	4–0	**Tillman** (4–2)	Guthrie (2–3)	—	Kauffman Stadium	25,985	22–18	W2
41	May 17	@ Royals	0–1	Duffy (2–3)	**Norris** (2–4)	Holland (11)	Kauffman Stadium	24,064	22–19	L1
42	May 18	@ Royals	6–8	Shields (6–3)	**Jiménez** (2–5)	Holland (12)	Kauffman Stadium	22,692	22–20	L2
43	May 20	@ Pirates	9–2	**González** (2–3)	Liriano (0–4)	—	PNC Park	22,787	23–20	W1
44	May 21	@ Pirates	8–9	Morris (4–0)	**Webb** (2–1)	Melancon (7)	PNC Park	19,365	23–21	L1
45	May 22	Indians	7–8 (13)	Outman (4–0)	**Patton** (0–1)	Atchison (1)	Camden Yards	18,894	23–22	L2
46	May 23	Indians	8–4	**Norris** (3–4)	House (0–1)	—	Camden Yards	39,602	24–22	W1
47	May 24	Indians	0–9	Kluber (5–3)	**Jiménez** (2–6)	—	Camden Yards	36,873	24–23	L1
48	May 25	Indians	4–2	**González** (3–3)	Bauer (1–2)	**Britton** (2)	Camden Yards	37,649	25–23	W1
49	May 26	@ Brewers	7–6 (10)	**O'Day** (2–0)	Wooten (1–2)	**Britton** (3)	Miller Park	42,889	26–23	W2
50	May 27	@ Brewers	6–7 (10)	Rodriguez (2–1)	**McFarland** (0–1)	—	Miller Park	25,552	26–24	L1
51	May 28	@ Brewers	3–8	Gallardo (3–3)	**Norris** (3–5)	–	Miller Park	28,280	26–25	L2
52	May 29	@ Astros	1–3	Fields (1–3)	**Guilmet** (0–1)	Qualls (4)	Minute Maid Park	22,884	26–26	L3
53	May 30	@ Astros	1–2	Oberholtzer (2–6)	**González** (3–4)	Qualls (5)	Minute Maid Park	38,482	26–27	L4
54	May 31	@ Astros	4–1	**Tillman** (5–2)	Keuchel (6–3)	**Britton** (4)	Minute Maid Park	29,619	27–27	W1

June: 16–12 (.571) — Home: 9–9 — Road: 7–3

#	Date	Opponent	Score	Win	Loss	Save	Stadium	Attendance	Record	Box/ Streak
55	June 1	@ Astros	9–4	**Chen** (6–2)	Feldman (3–3)	–	Minute Maid Park	17,022	28–27	W2
56	June 3	@ Rangers	8–3	**Matusz** (2–1)	Ogando (2–3)	–	Globe Life Park in Arlington	31,542	29–27	W3
57	June 4	@ Rangers	6–5	**Norris** (4–5)	Martinez (1–2)	**Britton** (5)	Globe Life Park in Arlington	27,934	30–27	W4
58	June 5	@ Rangers	6–8	Ross (2–4)	**Matusz** (2–2)	Soria (12)	Globe Life Park in Arlington	34,254	30–28	L1
59	June 6	Athletics	3–4 (11)	Abad (1–2)	**Meek** (0–2)	Doolittle (8)	Camden Yards	28,076	30–29	L2
60	June 7	Athletics	6–3	**Gausman** (1–1)	Gray (6–2)	–	Camden Yards	44,202	31–29	W1
61	June 8	Athletics	1–11	Kazmir (7–2)	**Jiménez** (2–7)	–	Camden Yards	38,244	31–30	L1
62	June 9	Red Sox	4–0	**Norris** (5–5)	Peavy (1–4)	–	Camden Yards	19,729	32–30	W1
63	June 10	Red Sox	0–1	Workman (1–0)	**Tillman** (5–3)	Uehara (13)	Camden Yards	24,184	32–31	L1
64	June 11	Red Sox	6–0	**Chen** (7–2)	De La Rosa (1–2)	–	Camden Yards	25,886	33–31	W1
65	June 12	Blue Jays	4–2	**Gausman** (2–1)	Buehrle (10–3)	**Britton** (6)	Camden Yards	17,403	34–31	W2
66	June 13	Blue Jays	0–4	Hutchison (5–4)	**Jiménez** (2–8)	McGowan (1)	Camden Yards	44,031	34–32	L1
67	June 14	Blue Jays	3–2	**Norris** (6–5)	Dickey (6–5)	**Britton** (7)	Camden Yards	33,901	35–32	W1
68	June 15	Blue Jays	2–5	Happ (6–3)	**Tillman** (5–4)	Janssen (12)	Camden Yards	46,469	35–33	L1
69	June 16	@ Rays	4–5	McGee (3–0)	**O'Day** (2–1)	Oviedo (1)	Tropicana Field	10,576	35–34	L2
70	June 17	@ Rays	7–5	**González** (4–4)	Bédard (3–5)	**Britton** (8)	Tropicana Field	10,803	36–34	W1
71	June 18	@ Rays	2–0	**Gausman** (3–1)	Cobb (2–5)	**Britton** (9)	Tropicana Field	12,448	37–34	W2
72	June 20	@ Yankees	3–5	Huff (2–0)	**Britton** (3–1)	–	Yankee Stadium	46,197	37–35	L1
73	June 21	@ Yankees	6–1	**Norris** (7–5)	Nuño (1–4)	–	Yankee Stadium	47,165	38–35	W1
74	June 22	@ Yankees	8–0	**Tillman** (6–4)	Tanaka (11–2)	–	Yankee Stadium	47,493	39–35	W2
75	June 23	White Sox	6–4	**Brach** (1–0)	Belisario (3–4)	–	Camden Yards	17,931	40–35	W3
76	June 24	White Sox	2–4	Quintana (4–7)	**González** (4–5)	Belisario (8)	Camden Yards	20,596	40–36	L1
77	June 25	White Sox	5–4 (12)	**Hunter** (2–1)	Webb (4–2)	–	Camden Yards	22,020	41–36	W1
78	June 27	Rays	2–5	Colomé (1–0)	**Gausman** (3–2)	McGee (2)	Camden Yards	15,614	41–37	L1
79	June 27	Rays	4–1	**Tillman** (7–4)	Oviedo (3–3)	**Britton** (10)	Camden Yards	34,895	42–37	W1
80	June 28	Rays	4–5	Bédard (4–5)	**Chen** (7–3)	McGee (3)	Camden Yards	36,387	42–38	L1
81	June 29	Rays	7–12	Cobb (3–6)	**Meek** (0–3)	–	Camden Yards	32,665	42–39	L2
82	June 30	Rangers	7–1	**Jiménez** (3–8)	Saunders (0–5)	–	Camden Yards	15,252	43–39	W1

July: 17–8 (.680) — Home: 8–3 — Road: 9–5

#	Date	Opponent	Score	Win	Loss	Save	Stadium	Attendance	Record	Box/ Streak
83	July 1	Rangers	8–3	**McFarland** (1–1)	Martinez (1–6)	–	Camden Yards	19,150	44–39	W2
84	July 2	Rangers	6–4	**Brach** (2–0)	Cotts (2–5)	**Britton** (11)	Camden Yards	13,478	45–39	W3
85	July 3	Rangers	5–2	**Chen** (8–3)	Baker (0–2)	**Britton** (12)	Camden Yards	24,535	46–39	W4
–	July 4	@ Red Sox	Postponed (rain). Makeup date July 5 as part of doubleheader.							
86	July 5	@ Red Sox	2–3	Uehara (4–2)	**McFarland** (1–2)	–	Fenway Park	35,714	46–40	L1
87	July 5	@ Red Sox	7–4	**Brach** (3–0)	Lackey (9–6)	**Britton** (13)	Fenway Park	36,468	47–40	W1
88	July 6	@ Red Sox	7–6 (12)	**Brach** (4–0)	Mujica (2–4)	**Britton** (14)	Fenway Park	35,811	48–40	W2
89	July 7	@ Nationals	8–2 (11)	**McFarland** (2–2)	Stammen (0–4)	–	Nationals Park	35,126	49–40	W3
–	July 8	@ Nationals	Postponed (rain). Makeup date August 4.							
90	July 9	Nationals	2–6	Fister (8–2)	**Norris** (7–6)	–	Camden Yards	35,575	49–41	L1
91	July 10	Nationals	4–3	**Chen** (9–3)	Gonzalez (6–5)	**Britton** (15)	Camden Yards	30,417	50–41	W1
92	July 11	Yankees	3–2 (10)	**McFarland** (3–2)	Warren (1–5)	–	Camden Yards	45,389	51–41	W2
93	July 12	Yankees	0–3	Greene (2–0)	**Tillman** (7–5)	Robertson (23)	Camden Yards	46,667	51–42	L1
94	July 13	Yankees	3–1 (5)	**Gausman** (4–2)	Whitley (4–3)	–	Camden Yards	34,483	52–42	W1
ASG	July 15	All-Star Game	NL 3–5 AL	Scherzer	Neshek	Perkins	Target Field			Box
95	July 18	@ Athletics	4–5	O'Flaherty (1–0)	**Britton** (3–2)	–	O.co Coliseum	27,232	52–43	L1
96	July 19	@ Athletics	8–4	**Chen** (10–3)	Hammel (8–7)	**Britton** (16)	O.co Coliseum	36,067	53–43	W1
97	July 20	@ Athletics	2–10	Gray (11–3)	**Gausman** (4–3)	–	O.co Coliseum	30,124	53–44	L1
98	July 21	@ Angels	4–2	**Norris** (8–6)	Shoemaker (7–3)	**Britton** (17)	Angel Stadium of Anaheim	39,028	54–44	W1
99	July 22	@ Angels	4–2	**González** (5–5)	Morin (2–3)	**Britton** (18)	Angel Stadium of Anaheim	35,353	55–44	W2
100	July 23	@ Angels	2–3	Weaver (11–6)	**Hunter** (2–2)	Street (25)	Angel Stadium of Anaheim	40,185	55–45	L1
101	July 24	@ Mariners	4–0	**Chen** (11–3)	Iwakuma (8–5)	–	Safeco Field	19,621	56–45	W1
102	July 25	@ Mariners	2–1 (10)	**O'Day** (3–1)	Furbush (1–5)	**Britton** (19)	Safeco Field	34,792	57–45	W2
103	July 26	@ Mariners	3–4	Young (9–6)	**Norris** (8–7)	Rodney (28)	Safeco Field	36,936	57–46	L1
104	July 27	@ Mariners	3–2	**McFarland** (4–2)	Medina (4–2)	**Britton** (20)	Safeco Field	26,523	58–46	W1
105	July 29	Angels	7–6 (12)	**Webb** (3–1)	Rasmus (2–1)	–	Camden Yards	36,882	59–46	W2
106	July 30	Angels	4–3	**Gausman** (5–3)	Richards (11–4)	**Britton** (21)	Camden Yards	27,195	60–46	W3
107	July 31	Angels	0–1 (13)	Santiago (3–7)	**Webb** (3–2)	Street (28)	Camden Yards	24,974	60–47	L1

August: 19–9 (.679) — Home: 12–3 — Road: 7–6

#	Date	Opponent	Score	Win	Loss	Save	Stadium	Attendance	Record	Box/ Streak
108	August 1	Mariners	2–1	**Chen** (12–3)	Elías (8–9)	**Britton** (22)	Camden Yards	39,487	61–47	W1
109	August 2	Mariners	3–6	Leone (4–2)	**González** (5–6)	–	Camden Yards	36,508	61–48	L1
110	August 3	Mariners	1–0	**Tillman** (8–5)	Iwakuma (9–6)	**Britton** (23)	Camden Yards	35,217	62–48	W1
111	August 4	@ Nationals	7–3	**Gausman** (6–3)	Roark (11–7)	–	Nationals Park	42,181	63–48	W2
112	August 5	@ Blue Jays	9–3	**Norris** (9–7)	Buehrle (11–8)	–	Rogers Centre	36,183	64–48	W3
113	August 6	@ Blue Jays	1–5	Hutchison (8–9)	**Chen** (12–4)	–	Rogers Centre	33,054	64–49	L1
114	August 7	@ Blue Jays	2–1	**González** (6–6)	Happ (8–6)	**Britton** (24)	Rogers Centre	34,676	65–49	W1
115	August 8	Cardinals	12–2	**Tillman** (9–5)	Masterson (5–7)	–	Camden Yards	43,743	66–49	W2
116	August 9	Cardinals	10–3	**Jiménez** (4–8)	Lackey (12–8)	–	Camden Yards	40,894	67–49	W3
117	August 10	Cardinals	3–8	Lynn (12–8)	**Gausman** (6–4)	–	Camden Yards	27,779	67–50	L1
118	August 11	Yankees	11–3	**Norris** (10–7)	Capuano (1–3)	–	Camden Yards	34,018	68–50	W1
–	August 12	Yankees	Postponed (rain). Makeup date September 12 as part of doubleheader.							
119	August 13	Yankees	5–3	**O'Day** (4–1)	Kelley (2–4)	**Britton** (25)	Camden Yards	37,587	69–50	W2
120	August 15	@ Indians	1–2 (11)	Atchison (6–0)	**Matusz** (2–3)	–	Progressive Field	27,845	69–51	L1
121	August 16	@ Indians	0–6	Carrasco (5–4)	**Jiménez** (4–9)	–	Progressive Field	27,881	69–52	L2
122	August 17	@ Indians	4–1	**Gausman** (7–4)	Salazar (4–6)	**Britton** (26)	Progressive Field	22,564	70–52	W1
123	August 18	@ White Sox	8–2	**Norris** (11–7)	Sale (10–3)	–	U.S. Cellular Field	17,686	71–52	W2
124	August 19	@ White Sox	5–1	**Tillman** (10–5)	Quintana (6–10)	–	U.S. Cellular Field	13,307	72–52	W3
125	August 20	@ White Sox	4–3	**Chen** (13–4)	Noesí (7–9)	**Britton** (27)	U.S. Cellular Field	15,137	73–52	W4
126	August 22	@ Cubs	1–4	Arrieta (7–4)	**Gausman** (7–5)	Rondón (20)	Wrigley Field	33,761	73–53	L1
127	August 23	@ Cubs	2–7	Grimm (4–2)	**Norris** (11–8)	–	Wrigley Field	37,156	73–54	L2
128	August 24	@ Cubs	1–2	Wada (4–1)	**González** (6–7)	Rondón (21)	Wrigley Field	32,774	73–55	L3
129	August 25	Rays	9–1	**Tillman** (11–5)	Odorizzi (9–11)	–	Camden Yards	15,516	74–55	W1
130	August 26	Rays	4–2	**Brach** (5–0)	Balfour (1–6)	**Britton** (28)	Camden Yards	16,406	75–55	W2
131	August 27	Rays	1–3	Smyly (9–10)	**Gausman** (7–6)	McGee (15)	Camden Yards	20,762	75–56	L1
132	August 28	Rays	5–4	**Miller** (4–5)	Yates (0–2)	**Britton** (29)	Camden Yards	16,915	76–56	W1
133	August 29	Twins	9–1	**González** (7–7)	May (0–4)	–	Camden Yards	27,464	77–56	W2
134	August 30	Twins	3–2	**Miller** (5–5)	Burton (2–3)	**Britton** (30)	Camden Yards	30,322	78–56	W3
135	August 31	Twins	12–8	**Chen** (14–4)	Nolasco (5–10)	**Britton** (31)	Camden Yards	40,905	79–56	W4

September: 17–10 (.630) — Home: 10–4 — Road: 7–6

#	Date	Opponent	Score	Win	Loss	Save	Stadium	Attendance	Record	Box/ Streak
136	September 1	Twins	4–6	Hughes (15–9)	**Gausman** (7–7)	Perkins (33)	Camden Yards	33,156	79–57	L1
137	September 2	Reds	5–4	**Norris** (12–8)	Latos (5–4)	**Britton** (32)	Camden Yards	15,021	80–57	W1
138	September 3	Reds	6–0	**González** (8–7)	Axelrod (1–1)	–	Camden Yards	20,246	81–57	W2
139	September 4	Reds	9–7	**Hunter** (3–2)	Parra (0–2)	**Britton** (33)	Camden Yards	21,114	82–57	W3
140	September 5	@ Rays	0–3	Boxberger (4–1)	**Webb** (3–3)	McGee (16)	Tropicana Field	14,632	82–58	L1
141	September 6	@ Rays	2–3	Boxberger (5–1)	**Brach** (5–1)	–	Tropicana Field	17,969	82–59	L2
142	September 7	@ Rays	7–5 (11)	**Brach** (6–1)	Ramos (2–6)	**Miller** (1)	Tropicana Field	19,914	83–59	W1
143	September 8	@ Red Sox	4–0	**González** (9–7)	Kelly (3–4)	–	Fenway Park	35,894	84–59	W2
144	September 9	@ Red Sox	4–1	**Tillman** (12–5)	Ranaudo (3–2)	**Britton** (34)	Fenway Park	37,008	85–59	W3
145	September 10	@ Red Sox	10–6	**Chen** (15–4)	Workman (1–9)	**O'Day** (3)	Fenway Park	35,374	86–59	W4
146	September 12	Yankees	2–1 (11)	**Brach** (7–1)	Warren (3–6)	–	Camden Yards	31,871	87–59	W5
147	September 12	Yankees	5–0	**Norris** (13–8)	Mitchell (0–1)	–	Camden Yards	43,707	88–59	W6
148	September 13	Yankees	2–3	Greene (5–3)	**González** (9–8)	Robertson (36)	Camden Yards	44,231	88–60	L1
149	September 14	Yankees	3–2	**O'Day** (5–1)	Robertson (2–5)	–	Camden Yards	43,947	89–60	W1
150	September 15	Blue Jays	5–2	**Chen** (16–4)	Stroman (10–6)	**Britton** (35)	Camden Yards	25,061	90–60	W2
151	September 16	Blue Jays	8–2	**Jiménez** (5–9)	Hutchison (10–12)	–	Camden Yards	35,297	91–60	W3
152	September 17	Blue Jays	6–1	**Norris** (14–8)	Happ (9–11)	–	Camden Yards	37,537	92–60	W4
153	September 19	Red Sox	3–5 (10)	Tazawa (4–3)	**O'Day** (5–2)	Mujica (7)	Camden Yards	39,079	92–61	L1
154	September 20	Red Sox	7–2	**Tillman** (13–5)	De La Rosa (4–8)	–	Camden Yards	43,015	93–61	W1
155	September 21	Red Sox	2–3	Kelly (5–4)	**González** (9–9)	Mujica (8)	Camden Yards	38,329	93–62	L1
156	September 22	@ Yankees	0–5	Pineda (4–5)	**Chen** (16–5)	–	Yankee Stadium	35,614	93–63	L2
157	September 23	@ Yankees	5–4	**Jiménez** (6–9)	McCarthy (10–15)	**Britton** (36)	Yankee Stadium	43,201	94–63	W1
158	September 24	@ Yankees	9–5	**Norris** (15–8)	Greene (5–4)	–	Yankee Stadium	46,056	95–63	W2
159	September 25	@ Yankees	5–6	Robertson (4–5)	**Meek** (0–4)	–	Yankee Stadium	48,613	95–64	L1
160	September 26	@ Blue Jays	2–4	Hutchison (11–13)	**Tillman** (13–6)	Stroman (1)	Rogers Centre	27,037	95–65	L2
161	September 27	@ Blue Jays	2–4	Happ (11–11)	**Chen** (16–6)	Janssen (25)	Rogers Centre	37,996	95–66	L3
162	September 28	@ Blue Jays	1–0	**González** (10–9)	Dickey (14–13)	**Britton** (37)	Rogers Centre	45,901	96–66	W1

== Player stats ==
=== Batting ===
Note: G = Games played; AB = At bats; R = Runs; H = Hits; 2B = Doubles; 3B = Triples; HR = Home runs; RBI = Runs batted in; SB = Stolen bases; BB = Walks; AVG = Batting average; SLG = Slugging average

Player	G	AB	R	H	2B	3B	HR	RBI	SB	BB	AVG	SLG
Adam Jones	159	644	88	181	30	2	29	96	7	19	.281	.469
Nick Markakis	155	642	81	177	27	1	14	50	4	62	.276	.386
Nelson Cruz	159	613	87	166	32	2	40	108	4	55	.271	.525
J.J. Hardy	141	529	56	142	28	0	9	52	0	29	.268	.372
Jonathan Schoop	137	455	48	95	18	0	16	45	2	13	.209	.354
Chris Davis	127	450	65	88	16	0	26	72	2	60	.196	.404
Steve Pearce	102	338	51	99	26	0	21	49	5	40	.293	.556
Manny Machado	82	327	38	91	14	0	12	32	2	20	.278	.431
Ryan Flaherty	102	281	33	62	15	1	7	32	1	22	.221	.356
Caleb Joseph	82	246	22	51	9	0	9	28	0	17	.207	.354
Delmon Young	83	242	27	73	11	1	7	30	2	10	.302	.442
David Lough	112	174	31	43	6	3	4	16	8	15	.247	.385
Nick Hundley	50	159	17	37	4	0	5	19	1	10	.233	.352
Matt Wieters	26	104	13	32	5	0	5	18	0	6	.308	.500
Steve Clevenger	35	89	8	20	8	1	0	8	0	8	.225	.337
Alejandro De Aza	20	82	11	24	5	3	3	10	2	6	.293	.537
Steve Lombardozzi Jr.	20	73	6	21	1	1	0	2	1	0	.288	.329
Jimmy Paredes	18	53	9	16	4	0	2	8	2	2	.302	.491
Kelly Johnson	19	39	7	9	4	0	1	4	0	6	.231	.410
Christian Walker	6	18	1	3	1	0	1	1	0	1	.167	.389
Jemile Weeks	3	11	2	3	0	1	0	0	0	0	.273	.455
Alexi Casilla	1	4	0	0	0	0	0	0	0	0	.000	.000
Cord Phelps	3	3	0	0	0	0	0	0	0	0	.000	.000
Quintin Berry	10	2	3	0	0	0	0	0	1	0	.000	.000
Pitcher totals	162	18	1	1	0	0	0	1	0	0	.056	.056
Team totals	162	5596	705	1434	264	16	211	681	44	401	.256	.422

=== Pitching ===
Note: W = Wins; L = Losses; ERA = Earned run average; G = Games pitched; GS = Games started; SV = Saves; IP = Innings pitched; H = Hits allowed; R = Runs allowed; ER = Earned runs allowed; BB = Walks allowed; SO = Strikeouts

Player	W	L	ERA	G	GS	SV	IP	H	R	ER	BB	SO
Chris Tillman	13	6	3.34	34	34	0	207.1	189	83	77	66	150
Wei-Yin Chen	16	6	3.54	31	31	0	185.2	193	77	73	35	136
Bud Norris	15	8	3.65	28	28	0	165.1	149	68	67	52	139
Miguel González	10	9	3.23	27	26	0	159.0	155	61	57	51	111
Ubaldo Jiménez	6	9	4.81	25	22	0	125.1	113	68	67	77	116
Kevin Gausman	7	7	3.57	20	20	0	113.1	111	48	45	38	88
Zach Britton	3	2	1.65	71	0	37	76.1	46	17	14	23	62
Darren O'Day	5	2	1.70	68	0	4	68.2	42	14	13	19	73
Brad Brach	7	1	3.18	46	0	0	62.1	48	24	22	25	54
Tommy Hunter	3	2	2.97	60	0	11	60.2	55	22	20	12	45
TJ McFarland	4	2	2.76	37	1	0	58.2	70	22	18	13	34
Brian Matusz	2	3	3.48	63	0	0	51.2	51	23	20	17	53
Ryan Webb	3	3	3.83	51	0	0	49.1	50	21	21	12	37
Evan Meek	0	4	5.79	23	0	0	23.1	26	16	15	11	16
Andrew Miller	2	0	1.35	23	0	1	20.0	8	3	3	4	34
Josh Stinson	0	0	6.23	8	0	0	13.0	16	9	9	6	6
Preston Guilmet	0	1	5.23	10	0	0	10.1	8	6	6	2	12
Troy Patton	0	1	8.10	9	0	0	6.2	9	6	6	4	5
Joe Saunders	0	0	13.50	6	0	0	3.1	3	5	5	4	1
Ramón Ramírez	0	0	0.00	1	0	0	1.0	0	0	0	1	2
Team totals	96	66	3.43	162	162	53	1461.1	1342	593	557	472	1174

== Post-season ==
=== Division Series ===
The Orioles swept the Detroit Tigers in the Division Series.

==== ALDS notes ====
- The 12 runs scored by the Orioles in Game 1 were the most runs the Orioles have ever scored in a post-season game.
- The Orioles sweep of the Tigers was their first post-season sweep since 1971 when they beat the Oakland Athletics 3–0.
- By winning successive games against 2011, 2012 and 2013 Cy Young Award winners Justin Verlander, David Price and Max Scherzer, the Orioles became only the fourth team to win a postseason series over three Cy Young winners, the only one ever to do so in consecutive games, and the only one not against the 1990s Braves trio of Tom Glavine, Greg Maddux and John Smoltz. In fact, with the final regular-season win over Toronto's R. A. Dickey, the Orioles won 4 consecutive games started by Cy Young winners, an unprecedented feat.

=== Championship Series ===
The Orioles were swept by the Kansas City Royals 4 games to 0 in the AL pennant series.

=== Postseason game log ===
ALDS Game Log

2014 Baltimore Orioles Postseason Game Log
American League Division Series vs. Detroit Tigers (Baltimore won series 3–0)

#	Date	Opponent	Score	Win	Loss	Save	Stadium	Attendance	Series
1	October 2	Tigers	12–3	Tillman (1–0)	Scherzer (0–1)	—	Camden Yards	47,842	1–0
2	October 3	Tigers	7–6	Brach (1–0)	Soria (0–1)	Britton (1)	Camden Yards	48,058	2–0
3	October 5	@ Tigers	2–1	Norris (1–0)	Price (0–1)	Britton (2)	Comerica Park	43,013	3–0

2014 ALDS composite box score

Inning	1	2	3	4	5	6	7	8	9	R	H	E
Baltimore	2	1	2	1	0	2	1	12	0	21	26	1
Detroit	0	2	0	5	0	0	0	2	1	10	22	2

ALCS Game Log

American League Championship Series vs. Kansas City Royals (Baltimore lost series 0–4)

#	Date	Opponent	Score	Win	Loss	Save	Stadium	Attendance	Series
1	October 10	Royals	6–8 (10)	Davis (1–0)	O'Day (0–1)	Holland (1)	Camden Yards	47,124	0–1
2	October 11	Royals	4–6	Davis (2–0)	O'Day (0–2)	Holland (2)	Camden Yards	46,912	0–2
3	October 14	@ Royals	1–2	Frasor (1–0)	Chen (0–1)	Holland (3)	Kauffman Stadium	40,183	0–3
4	October 15	@ Royals	1–2	Vargas (1–0)	González (0–1)	Holland (4)	Kauffman Stadium	40,468	0–4

2014 ALCS composite box score

Inning	1	2	3	4	5	6	7	8	9	10	R	H	E
Baltimore	0	2	4	0	4	1	0	0	0	1	12	30	3
Kansas City	4	0	5	2	1	1	0	0	2	3	18	37	2

== Accolades ==
The following players represented the Orioles in the 2014 Major League Baseball All-Star Game

- Nelson Cruz (3rd appearance)
- Adam Jones (4th appearance)
- Matt Wieters (3rd appearance)

DH Nelson Cruz won the MLB and American League home run championships with 40

Center fielder Adam Jones and right fielder Nick Markakis both won the Rawlings Gold Glove Award.

Manager Buck Showalter was named the American League Manager of the Year, his third award.

General Manager Dan Duquette was named The Sporting News' Major League Baseball Executive of the Year

== Roster ==
2014 Baltimore Orioles
Roster
Pitchers: 35 Brad Brach; 53 Zach Britton; 16 Wei-Yin Chen; 39 Kevin Gausman; 50 Miguel González; 63 Preston Guilmet; 29 Tommy Hunter; 31 Ubaldo Jiménez; 17 Brian Matusz; 66 T. J. McFarland; 47 Evan Meek; 48 Andrew Miller; 25 Bud Norris; 56 Darren O'Day; 40 Troy Patton; 48 Ramón Ramírez; 51 Joe Saunders; 60 Josh Stinson; 30 Chris Tillman; 58 Ryan Webb	Catchers: 45 Steve Clevenger; 40 Nick Hundley; 36 Caleb Joseph; 32 Matt Wieters; Infielders: 1 Alexi Casilla; 19 Chris Davis; 3 Ryan Flaherty; 2 J. J. Hardy; 14 Kelly Johnson; 12 Steve Lombardozzi Jr.; 13 Manny Machado; 38 Jimmy Paredes; 28 Steve Pearce; 6 Jonathan Schoop; 18 Christian Walker; 1 Jemile Weeks	Outfielders: 12 Alejandro De Aza; 34 Quintin Berry; 23 Nelson Cruz; 10 Adam Jones; 9 David Lough; 21 Nick Markakis; 27 Delmon Young; Other batters: 38 Cord Phelps	Manager: 26 Buck Showalter; Coaches: 72 Rudy Árias (bullpen catcher); 54 Dom Chiti (bullpen); 55 Einar Díaz (assistant hitting); 11 Bobby Dickerson (third base); 24 Wayne Kirby (first base); 15 Jim Presley (hitting); 77 John Russell (bench); 37 Dave Wallace (pitching)

== Farm system ==
Level	Team	League	Manager
AAA	Norfolk Tides	International League	Ron Johnson
AA	Bowie Baysox	Eastern League	Gary Kendall
A	Frederick Keys	Carolina League	Luis Pujols
A	Delmarva Shorebirds	South Atlantic League	Ryan Minor
A-Short Season	Aberdeen IronBirds	New York–Penn League	Matt Merullo
Rookie	GCL Orioles	Gulf Coast League	Orlando Gómez
