= Austin Film Critics Association Awards 2017 =

Annual US film awards ceremony

13th AFCA Awards

Best Film:
Get Out

The 13th Austin Film Critics Association Awards, honoring the best in filmmaking for 2017, were announced on January 8, 2018.

== Winners and nominees ==
Best Film	Best Director
1. Get Out; 2. The Shape of Water; 3. Call Me by Your Name; 4. Lady Bird; 5. Three Billboards Outside Ebbing, Missouri; 6. The Florida Project; 7. Dunkirk; 8. I, Tonya; 9. The Big Sick; 10. Logan	Guillermo del Toro – The Shape of Water; Greta Gerwig – Lady Bird; Christopher Nolan – Dunkirk; Jordan Peele – Get Out; Denis Villeneuve – Blade Runner 2049
Best Actor	Best Actress
Timothée Chalamet – Call Me by Your Name; James Franco – The Disaster Artist; Daniel Kaluuya – Get Out; Gary Oldman – Darkest Hour; Robert Pattinson – Good Time	Frances McDormand – Three Billboards Outside Ebbing, Missouri; Sally Hawkins – The Shape of Water; Margot Robbie – I, Tonya; Saoirse Ronan – Lady Bird; Kristen Stewart – Personal Shopper
Best Supporting Actor	Best Supporting Actress
Willem Dafoe – The Florida Project; Armie Hammer – Call Me by Your Name; Richard Jenkins – The Shape of Water; Sam Rockwell – Three Billboards Outside Ebbing, Missouri; Michael Stuhlbarg – Call Me by Your Name	Allison Janney – I, Tonya; Mary J. Blige – Mudbound; Holly Hunter – The Big Sick; Laurie Metcalf – Lady Bird; Octavia Spencer – The Shape of Water
Best Original Screenplay	Best Adapted Screenplay
Get Out – Jordan Peele; The Big Sick – Emily V. Gordon and Kumail Nanjiani; Lady Bird – Greta Gerwig; The Shape of Water – Guillermo del Toro and Vanessa Taylor; Three Billboards Outside Ebbing, Missouri – Martin McDonagh	Call Me by Your Name – James Ivory; The Beguiled – Sofia Coppola; The Disaster Artist – Scott Neustadter and Michael H. Weber; Molly's Game – Aaron Sorkin; Mudbound – Dee Rees and Virgil Williams
Best Animated Film	Best Foreign Language Film
Coco; The Breadwinner; The Lego Batman Movie; Loving Vincent; Your Name	Okja; Blade of the Immortal; Raw; The Square; Thelma
Best First Film	Best Documentary
Get Out; Brigsby Bear; I Don't Feel at Home in This World Anymore; Ingrid Goes West; Molly's Game	Faces Places; Icarus; Jane; Kedi; The Work
Best Cinematography	Best Score
Blade Runner 2049 – Roger Deakins; Darkest Hour – Bruno Delbonnel; Dunkirk – Hoyte van Hoytema; Mudbound – Rachel Morrison; The Shape of Water – Dan Laustsen	The Shape of Water – Alexandre Desplat; Blade Runner 2049 – Benjamin Wallfisch and Hans Zimmer; Dunkirk – Hans Zimmer; Phantom Thread – Jonny Greenwood; Star Wars: The Last Jedi – John Williams
Bobby McCurdy Memorial Breakthrough Artist Award	Austin Film Award
Timothée Chalamet – Call Me by Your Name, Hostiles and Lady Bird; Mary J. Blige – Mudbound; Greta Gerwig – Lady Bird; Brooklynn Prince – The Florida Project; Florence Pugh – Lady Macbeth	I Don't Feel at Home in This World Anymore – Macon Blair; Barracuda – Jason Cortlund and Julia Halperin; Infinity Baby – Bob Byington; Last Flag Flying – Richard Linklater; Shot Caller – Ric Roman Waugh
Special Honorary Award
The Shape of Water’s Doug Jones and War for the Planet of the Apes’ Andy Serkis for their exemplary body and motion-capture performances, respectively.; Harry Dean Stanton, for his body of work.
