= Ryan Webb =

American baseball player (born 1986)

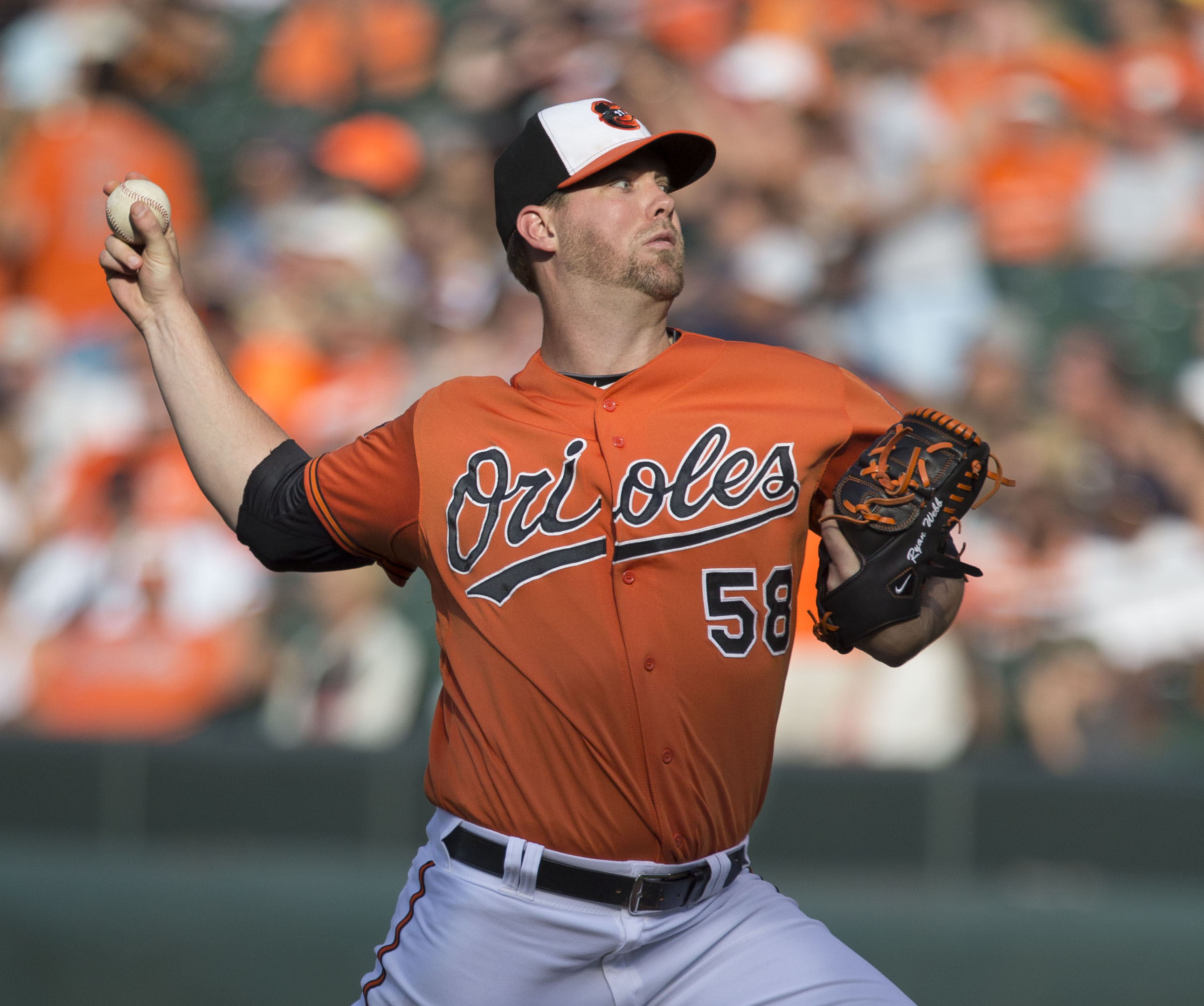
- Webb pitching for the Baltimore Orioles in 2014
- Pitcher
- Born: February 5, 1986 (age 40); Clearwater, Florida, U.S.
- Batted: Right Threw: Right

MLB debut
- July 8, 2009, for the San Diego Padres

Last MLB appearance
- June 26, 2016, for the Tampa Bay Rays

MLB statistics
- Win–loss record: 17–18
- Earned run average: 3.43
- Strikeouts: 271
- Stats at Baseball Reference

Teams
- San Diego Padres (2009–2010); Florida / Miami Marlins (2011–2013); Baltimore Orioles (2014); Cleveland Indians (2015); Tampa Bay Rays (2016)

Ryan Christopher Webb (born February 5, 1986) is an American former professional baseball relief pitcher. He has pitched in Major League Baseball (MLB) for the San Diego Padres, Florida / Miami Marlins, Baltimore Orioles, Cleveland Indians, and Tampa Bay Rays. He is the son of former big leaguer Hank Webb.

Prior to playing professionally, he attended Clearwater Central Catholic High School.

== Professional career ==
=== Oakland Athletics ===
Drafted by the Oakland Athletics in the fourth round of the 2004 Major League Baseball draft, Webb began his professional career that year with the AZL Athletics. He went 1-1 with a 4.87 ERA in eight games within the Arizona League. In 2005, he pitched for the Kane County Cougars, going 5-11 with a 4.76 ERA in 24 games and finished third in the Midwest League in losses and fifth in home runs allowed with 16.

With the Stockton Ports in 2006, he went 8-9 with a 5.28 ERA in 23 starts, and in 20 total starts split between the Ports and Midland RockHounds in 2007, he went 4-11 with a 6.54 ERA. He went 9-8 in 25 games with Midland in 2008.

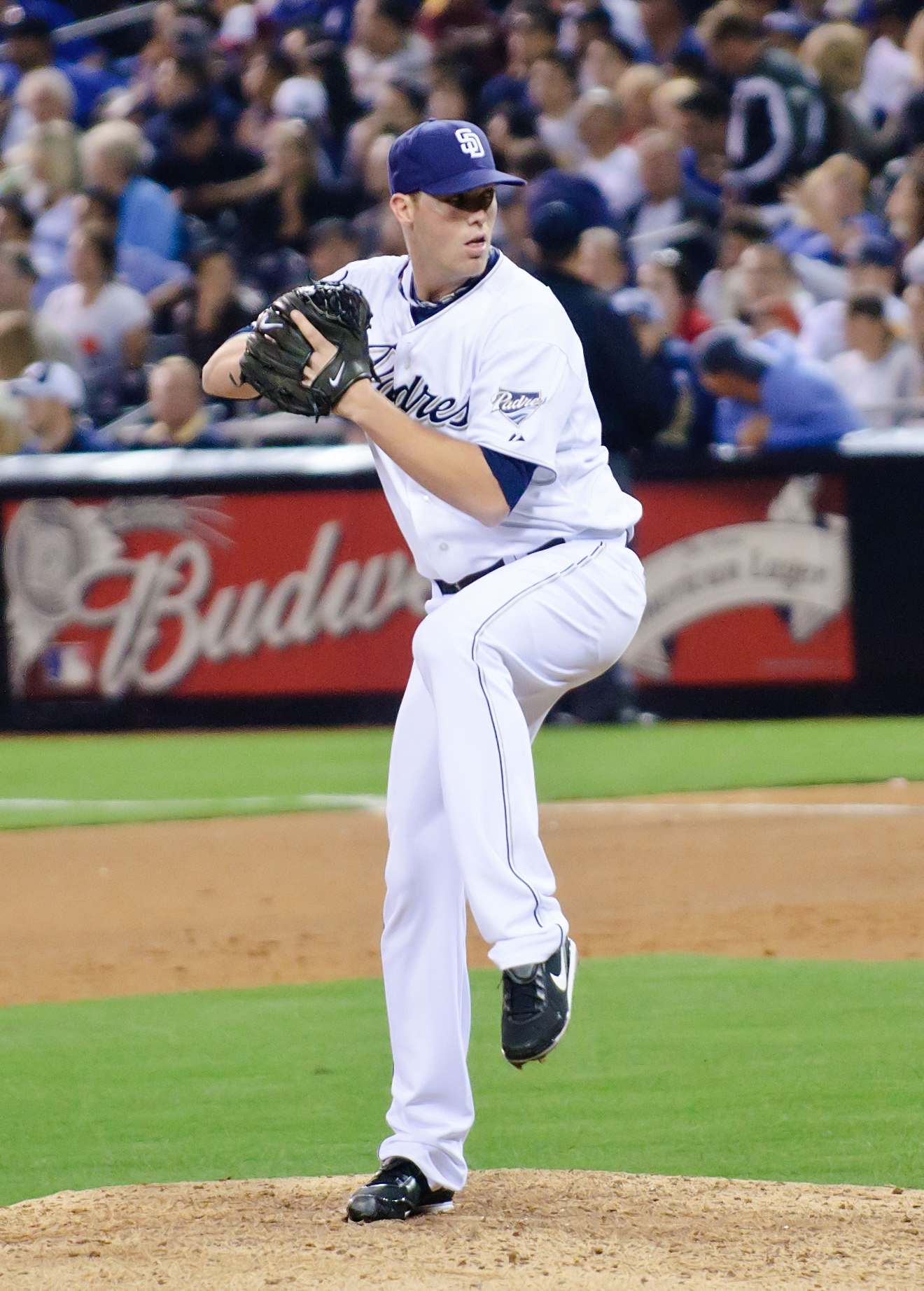
Webb pitching for the San Diego Padres in 2010

=== San Diego Padres ===
On July 5, 2009, Webb was traded to the San Diego Padres as part of a trade involving Scott Hairston, and was added to the Major League roster. In 28 games with the Padres, he went 2-1 with a 3.86 ERA and 6 holds, striking out 19 in 25.2 innings. Webb opened 2010 with Triple-A Portland, where he pitched in 8 games before being recalled on May 4 to replace the injured Sean Gallagher. When Gallagher returned on May 28, it was Adam Russell who was optioned. Webb was sent down on August 7, and returned for one game on August 20 before being sent down the next day. He was recalled when the rosters expanded on September 1. In 54 games with San Diego in 2010, he went 3-1 with a 2.90 ERA and 9 holds, striking out 44 in 59 innings.

=== Florida/Miami Marlins ===
Following the 2010 season, Webb was traded with Edward Mujica to the Marlins for Cameron Maybin. Webb made the team in 2011 as a middle reliever. In his Marlins debut, he gave up 3 runs in the top of the 10th against the Mets on April 2, earning the loss. In April, he had an 11-game, 12.1 inning scoreless streak. After feeling soreness in his shoulder after an appearance against the Mariners on June 26, Webb was placed on the disabled list on July 2. He returned on August 17, and finished the season with Florida. In 2011, he went 2-4 with a 3.20 ERA and 8 holds, striking out 31 in 50.2 innings.

Webb made the team in 2012. After having a rough June and beginning of July, going 1-1 with an 8.16 ERA in 14.1 innings, he was optioned to Triple-A New Orleans when Edward Mujica returned on July 16. After a 3-game stint with the Zephyrs, he returned to Miami when Logan Morrison was placed on the disabled list on July 29. In 65 games with Miami, he went 4-3 with a 4.03 ERA and 10 holds, striking out 44 in 60.1 innings.

On January 18, 2013, Webb signed a one-year, $975,000 deal with the Marlins to avoid arbitration for the first time. He had a 13-game, 17.1 inning scoreless streak starting on April 23 and ending on May 21. Webb played all of 2013 with Miami, where in a career-high 66 appearances, he went 2-6 with a 2.91 ERA and a career-low 4 holds, striking out 54 in 80.1 innings. Webb fell one appearance short of earning a $10,000 bonus, which came at 67 appearances. After the season, Webb was non-tendered by Miami, becoming a free agent.

=== Baltimore Orioles ===
On December 10, 2013, Webb signed a two-year, $4.5 million deal with the Baltimore Orioles. On May 7 Webb picked up his first win in an Orioles jersey pitching in relief against the Tampa Bay Rays. Webb earned his second victory of the season 3 nights later when Steve Clevenger hit a walk-off double after Webb had worked the top of the 10th inning. Despite owning an ERA of 3.80 in 42 games for the O's, Webb was optioned to the minors on August 1. He was designated for assignment on April 6, 2015.

=== Los Angeles Dodgers ===
On April 9, 2015, Webb was traded to the Los Angeles Dodgers (along with minor league catcher Brian Ward and a competitive balance draft pick) in exchange for minor leaguers Ben Rowen and Chris O'Brien. The Dodgers outrighted him to the minors on April 12. He accepted the assignment to AAA but the Dodgers released him the following day, on April 13.

=== Cleveland Indians ===
On April 14, 2015, Webb signed a minor league contract with the Cleveland Indians. Webb's contract was purchased by the Indians on April 29, 2015, when he was added to the Indians' active roster. He became a free agent following the season.

=== Tampa Bay Rays ===
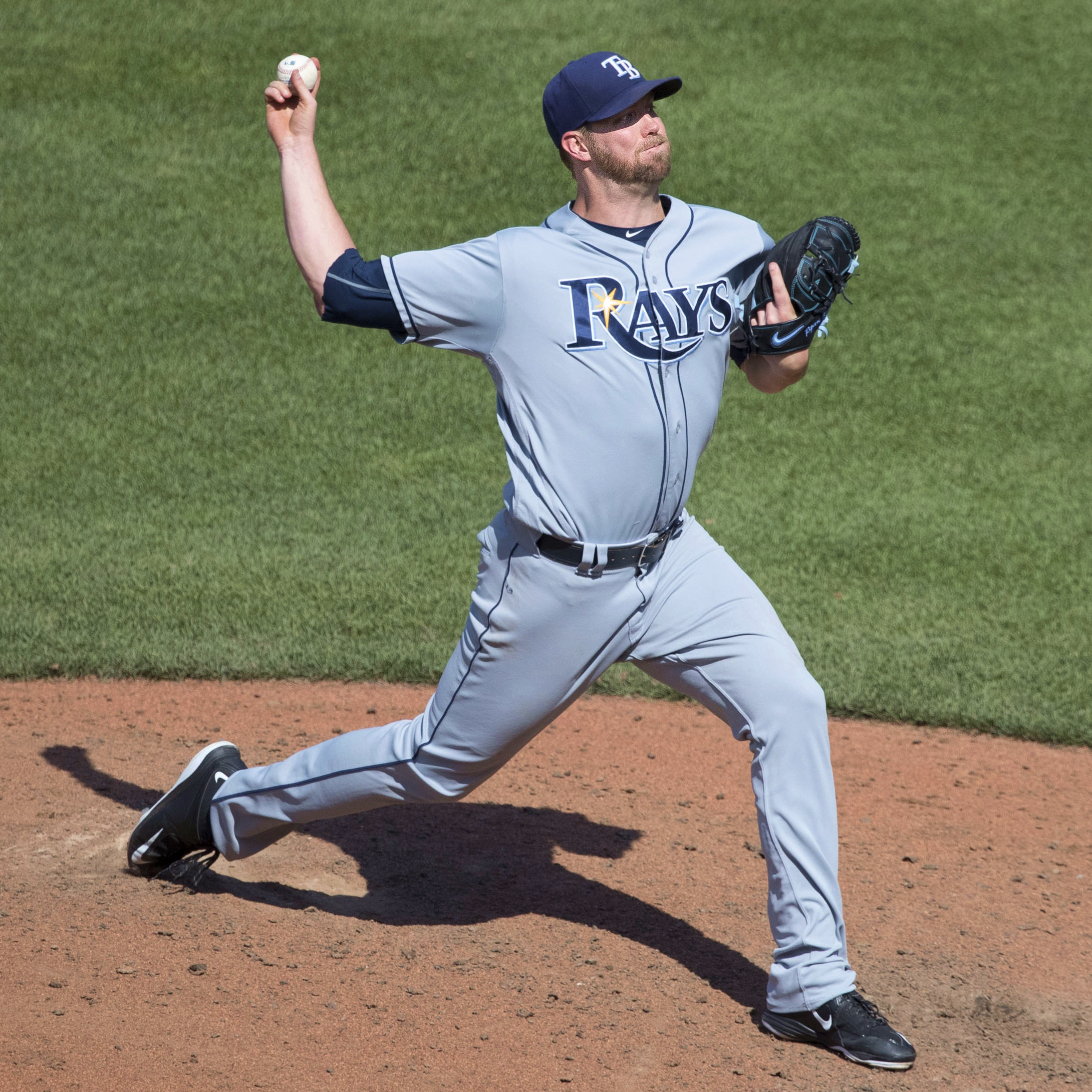
Webb pitching for the Tampa Bay Rays in 2016

On February 18, 2016, Webb signed a one-year major league contract with the Tampa Bay Rays for the 2016 season. He was designated for assignment on June 27, and released on July 4, 2016.

=== Chicago White Sox ===
On July 8, 2016, the White Sox signed Webb to a minor league contract. On July 21, Webb was placed on the disabled list. He was released on August 31.

=== Milwaukee Brewers ===
On December 8, 2016, Webb signed a minor league contract with the Milwaukee Brewers. On March 22, 2017, he was released.

=== San Francisco Giants ===
On March 27, 2017, Webb signed a minor league contract with the San Francisco Giants. He was released on June 10.

=== Chicago Cubs ===
On June 11, 2018, Webb signed a minor league contract with the Chicago Cubs. He was released on August 10, 2018.

=== Somerset Patriots ===
On August 25, 2018, Webb signed with the Somerset Patriots of the Atlantic League of Professional Baseball. He became a free agent following the 2018 season. In 6 games (2 starts) 10 innings he went 0-0 with a 3.60 ERA with 10 strikeouts.

== Pitching style ==
Webb is a sinkerballer, throwing his sinker mainly around 93 mph (95 mph in 2011). His secondary pitch is a slider in the mid 80s (his primary off-speed pitch to right-handed hitters), a changeup, also in the mid 80s (his primary off-speed pitch to left-handed hitters), and rarely throwing a four seam fastball at 92 mph.

== See also ==
- List of second-generation Major League Baseball players
