= Now, Forager =

- Directed by: Jason Cortlund; Julia Halperin
- Written by: Jason Cortlund
- Screenplay by: Jason Cortlund
- Starring: Jason Cortlund; Tiffany Esteb
- Cinematography: Jonathan Nastasi
- Edited by: Jason Cortlund; Julia Halperin
- Production company: Small Drama Monternia
- Distributed by: Argot Pictures
- Release date: January 27, 2012 (Rotterdam)
- Running time: 93 minutes
- Country: United States
- Language: English

Now, Forager is a 2012 indie film directed by Jason Cortlund and Julia Halperin.

Now, Forager, billed as "A film about love and fungi", presents the story of a couple, Regina (Tiffany Esteb) and Lucien (Jason Cortlund, who also wrote and co-directed), who forage for wild mushrooms in forests and sell them door to door to Manhattan restaurants. As well as being mycologicists (experts on fungi), both are also expert chefs and slow food aficionados. As their relationship develops, Regina takes a better-paying job at a restaurant, which strains the couple's relationship. A cross-country road trip planned by Lucien ends poorly in New Jersey, and Lucien – from financial desperation – takes a catering job, where his dilettante client's interferences drive him to inner rage.

Roger Ebert described Now, Forager as "An uncompromising film about two people who don't deserve each other — but maybe nobody deserves either one of them", enthusing that "The images of wild mushrooms... and the shots of food prep by cinematographer Jonathan Nastasi, approach art".

The original screenplay was also by Cortlund, himself an amateur mycologist and member of the New York Mycological Society. The title directly references Walt Whitman's American transcendentalist poem "The Untold Want" from Leaves of Grass—and less directly the 1942 Bette Davis and Paul Henreid vehicle, Now, Voyager.

Now, Forager was a nominee at the Gotham Independent Film Awards 2012 in the category of Breakthrough Director (the category winner was Benh Zeitlin for Beasts of the Southern Wild). The film was an official selection at the 2012 New Directors/New Films festival (US premiere), the 2012 Napa Valley Film Festival and the 2012 New Orleans Film Festival, won the Best Feature Drama award at Devour! The Food Film Fest, and was screened at many other festivals and arts institutions worldwide. It also won the Audience Award and a Theater Owners' Recommendation at the 2012 International Filmfestival Mannheim-Heidelberg.

Now, Forager had its World Premiere at the 2012 International Film Festival Rotterdam, and was distributed in the Netherlands, Belgium, and Luxembourg by Imagine Films Distribution (theatrical, 2013), Filmfreak Distributie (DVD, 2013), and Film1 (television, 2014) under the alternate title Love & Fungi. The film was distributed in theaters and on television in Poland under the title Tam, gdzie rosna grzyby The Kaunas International Film Festival also released Now, Forager in theaters in Latvia, Lithuania, and Estonia.
