= Edward Mujica =

Venezuelan baseball player (born 1984)

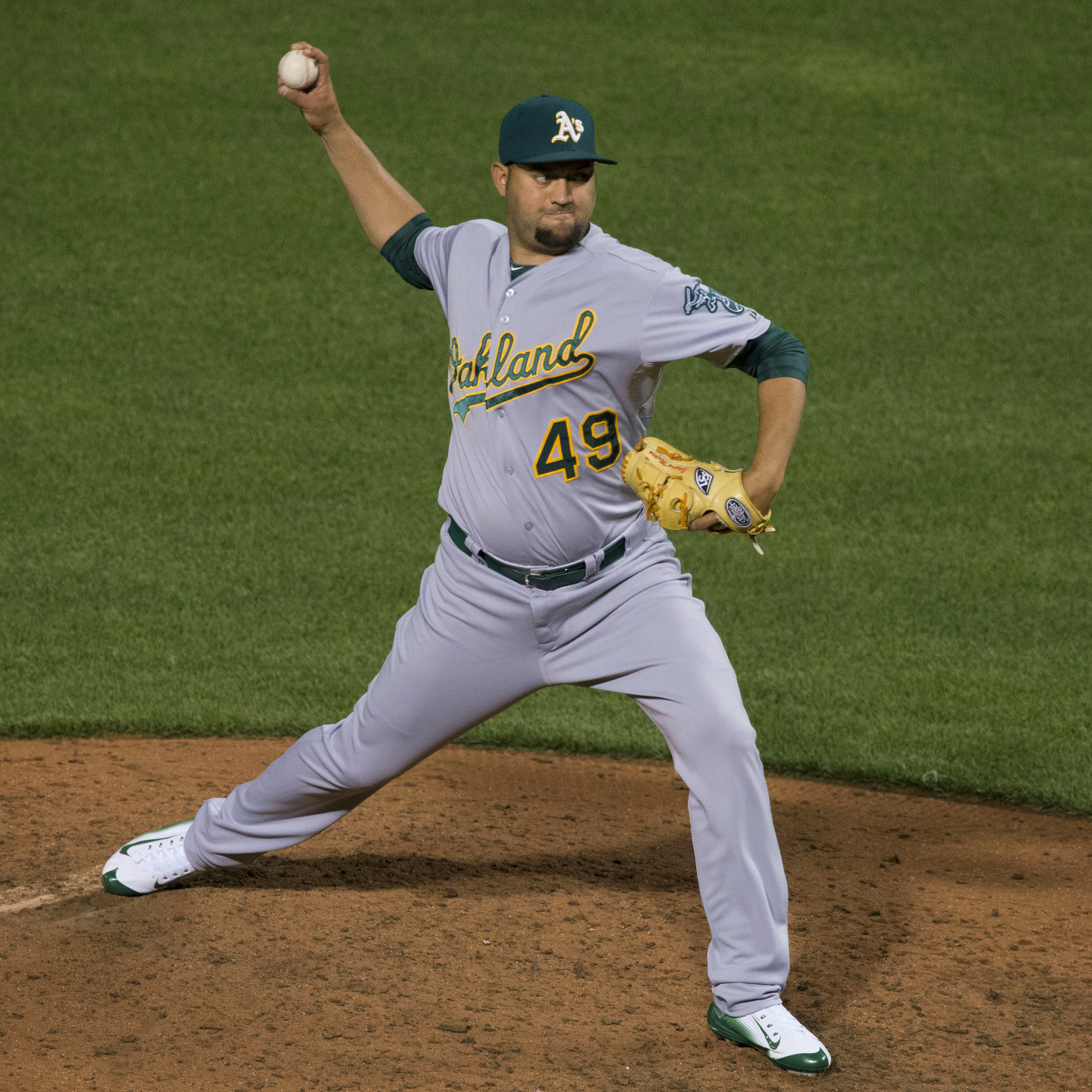
- Mujica with the Oakland Athletics
- Pitcher
- Born: May 10, 1984 (age 42); Valencia, Carabobo, Venezuela
- Batted: Right Threw: Right

MLB debut
- June 21, 2006, for the Cleveland Indians

Last MLB appearance
- August 12, 2017, for the Detroit Tigers

MLB statistics
- Win–loss record: 24–28
- Earned run average: 3.92
- Strikeouts: 430
- Saves: 50
- Stats at Baseball Reference

Teams
- Cleveland Indians (2006–2008); San Diego Padres (2009–2010); Florida / Miami Marlins (2011–2012); St. Louis Cardinals (2012–2013); Boston Red Sox (2014–2015); Oakland Athletics (2015); Detroit Tigers (2017)

Career highlights and awards
- All-Star (2013)

Edward José Mujica (Spanish pronunciation: [muˈxika]; born May 10, 1984) is a Venezuelan former professional baseball pitcher. He played in Major League Baseball (MLB) for the Cleveland Indians, San Diego Padres, Florida/Miami Marlins, St. Louis Cardinals, Boston Red Sox, Oakland Athletics, and Detroit Tigers.

== Career ==
=== Cleveland Indians ===
Mujica originally signed with the Indians as an undrafted free agent on October 22, 2001. He quickly became one of the top pitching prospects in the Cleveland organization.

Mujica began his career as a starter with San Felipe, the Burlington Royals, and Lake County Captains in 2002, 2003, and 2004. He became a full-time reliever in 2005, and dominated the Carolina League as the closer with the Single-A Kinston Indians, earning a 2.08 ERA, 14 saves, 32 strikeouts and just two walks in 26 innings pitched before being promoted to the Double-A Akron Aeros. Mujica continued his dominance with the Aeros, going 2–1 with 10 saves, a 2.88 ERA, 33 strikeouts, and only five walks in 34 2/3 innings.

Mujica began 2006 in Akron, where he recorded eight saves without surrendering an earned run, 17 strikeouts, and nine walks in 19 innings before getting promoted to the Triple-A Buffalo Bisons. For Buffalo, he was 3–1 with five saves, a 2.48 ERA, 29 strikeouts, and five walks in 32 2/3 innings.

On June 21, 2006, Mujica made his major league debut with Cleveland. He pitched 2 2/3 scoreless innings, allowing three hits while striking out one batter. Mujica did not surrender an earned run in 2006 until his fourth appearance with the Indians, on July 14, a streak of 43 1/3 consecutive innings (19 for Akron, 19 2/3 for Buffalo and 4 2/3 for Cleveland). Mujica made 10 appearances for Cleveland in 2006, going 0–1 with a 2.95 ERA. He then split the next two seasons between Triple-A and the majors.

=== San Diego Padres ===
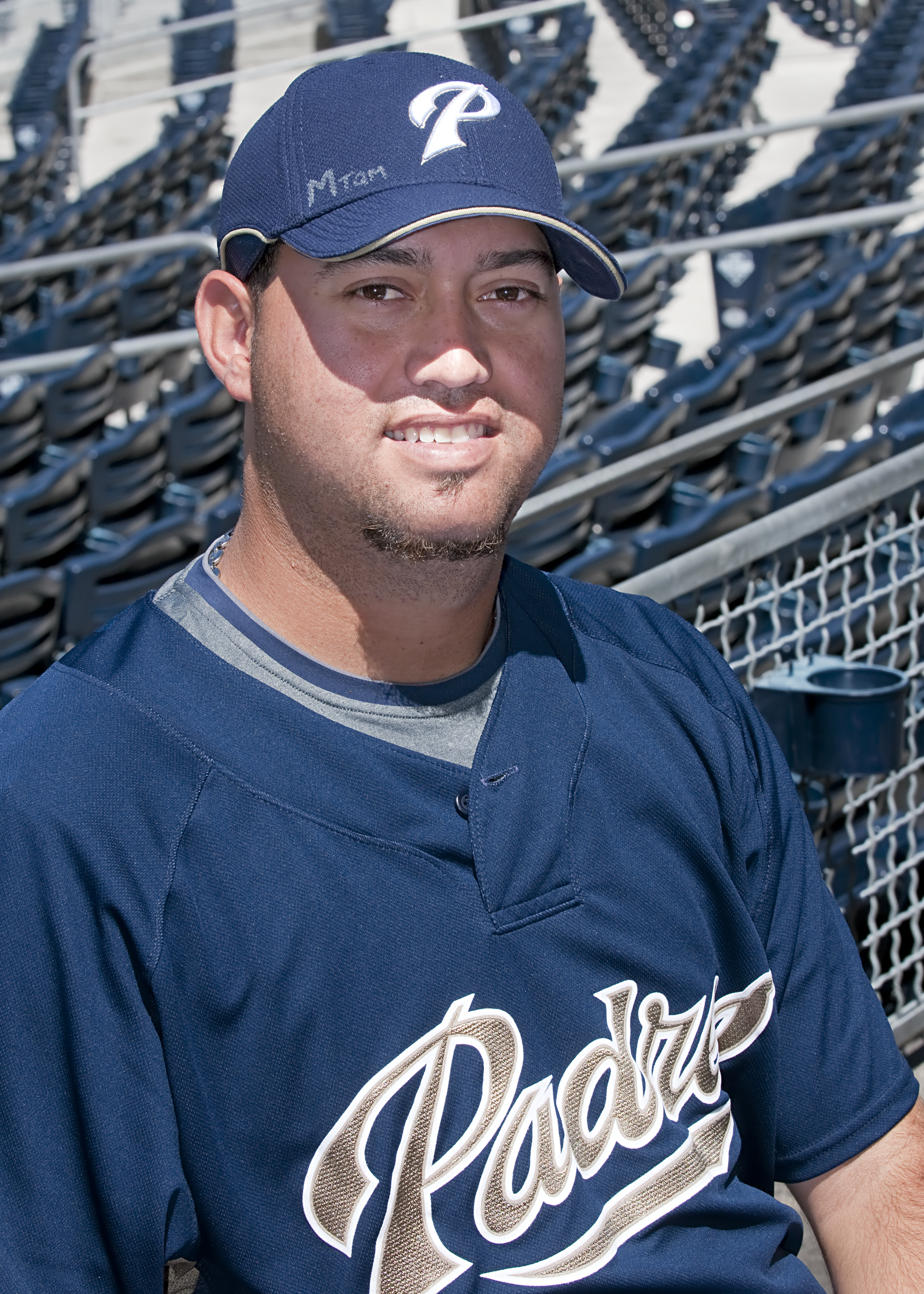
Mujica during his tenure with the San Diego Padres in 2009

On April 1, 2009, Mujica was traded to the San Diego Padres in exchange for future considerations. Mujica was awarded the win in the first ever regular season game at Citi Field against the New York Mets on April 13. On May 23, he earned his first career save in a 3–1 win over the Chicago Cubs. Mujica spent the entire 2009 season with the Padres, posting a 3–5 record, two saves, and a 3.94 ERA and 76 strikeouts in 67 relief appearances. He pitched 93 2/3 innings, allowing 101 hits and striking out 76 batters.

In 2010, Mujica was 2–1 with a 3.62 ERA and 72 strikeouts in 59 appearances for the Padres.

=== Florida/Miami Marlins ===
On November 13, 2010, Mujica was traded with Ryan Webb to the Florida Marlins in exchange for Cameron Maybin. Mujica appeared in 67 games in 2011, finishing 9–6 with 63 strikeouts and an ERA of 2.96.

On June 30, 2012, Mujica was placed on the 15-day disabled list after a line drive from opponent Plácido Polanco struck the fifth toe on his right foot; X-rays confirmed a fractured toe. He was activated on July 18. Mujica made 41 appearances for the Marlins in 2012, going 0–3 with two saves and a 4.38 ERA.

=== St. Louis Cardinals ===
On July 31, 2012, Mujica was traded to the St. Louis Cardinals for minor league third baseman Zack Cox. He was used primarily in the seventh inning of games for the team. In 29 relief appearances, Mujica recorded an excellent 1.03 ERA while striking out 21 batters in 26 1/3 innings pitched. He also saw his first postseason action, posting a 2.35 ERA in nine appearances and earning the win in Game 1 of the 2012 National League Championship Series.

In 2013, when Cardinals closer Jason Motte was injured and set-up man Mitchell Boggs lost his effectiveness, Mujica became the new closer (around mid-April) and began collecting saves in his new role. On July 14, 2013, it was confirmed that Mujica would replace fellow Cardinal Adam Wainwright in the 2013 All-Star Game, who had pitched two nights before against the Chicago Cubs. It was Mujica's first All-Star selection of his career. He was not called on to pitch, however. Mujica began to struggle due to lingering shoulder problems near the end of the season, and he posted a 11.05 ERA in September, resulting in his removal from the closer role. Mujica finished the season 2–1 with 37 saves and a 2.78 ERA in 65 relief appearances. He became a free agent after the 2013 World Series on October 31, 2013.

=== Boston Red Sox ===
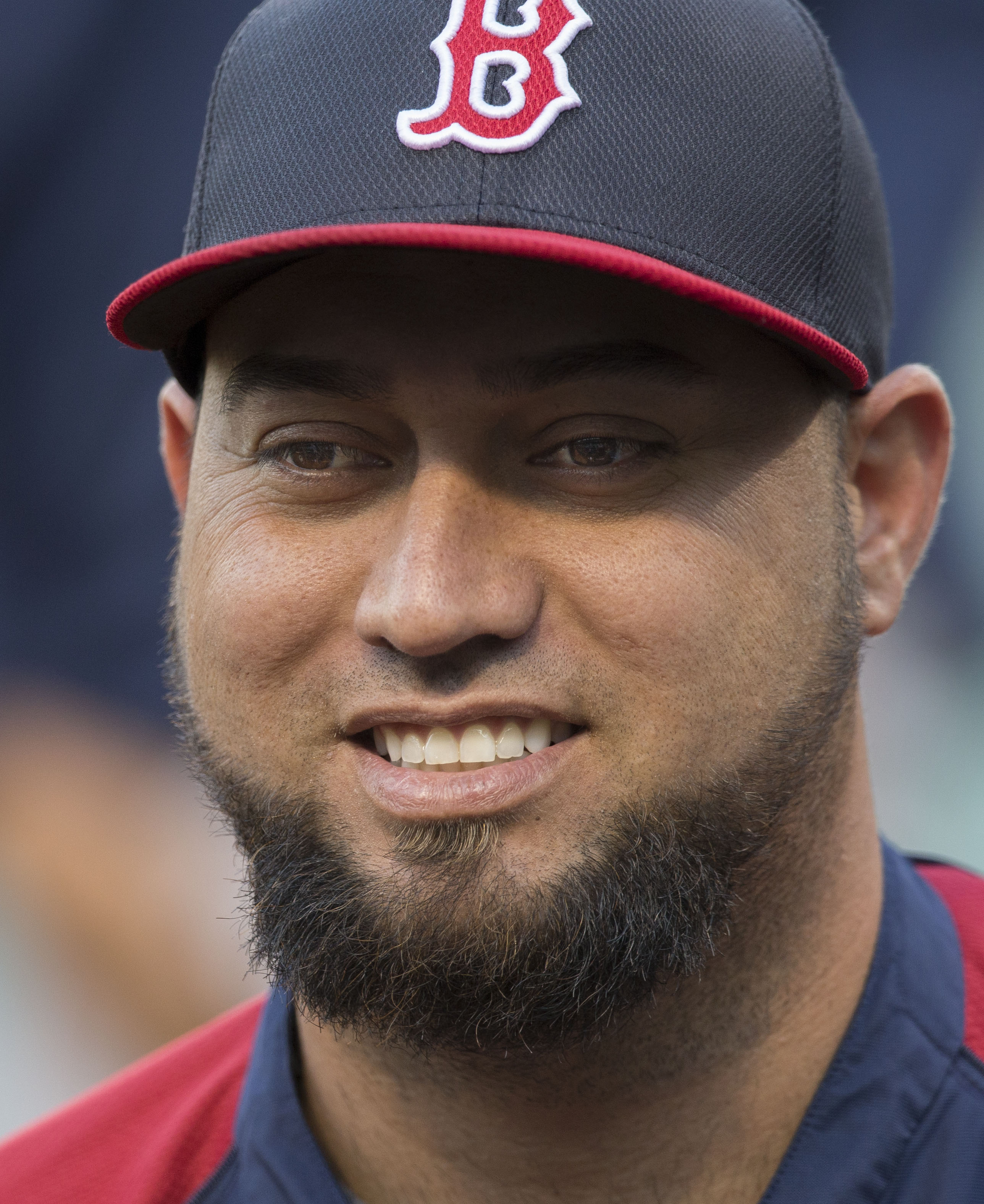
Mujica with the Boston Red Sox in 2014

On December 5, 2013, Mujica agreed to a two-year, $9.5 million contract with the Boston Red Sox, pending the completion of a physical examination. The contract became official on December 7. Mujica finished the 2014 season with a 2–4 record, eight saves and a 3.90 ERA in 64 appearances. After beginning the 2015 season 1–1 with a 4.61 ERA in 11 games, he was designated for assignment by Boston on May 8, 2015.

=== Oakland Athletics ===
On May 9, 2015, Mujica was traded to the Oakland Athletics in exchange for a player to be named later or cash. In 38 relief appearances with Oakland, he finished 2–4 with one save and a 4.81 ERA. He became a free agent following the season.

=== Philadelphia Phillies ===
On December 17, 2015, Mujica signed a minor league contract with the Philadelphia Phillies, receiving an invitation to spring training. He was released on March 29, 2016 and re-signed a day later. He was released on July 14 after requesting his release. He posted an 0–3 record with 23 saves and an ERA of 3.69 in 39 innings with the Triple–A Lehigh Valley IronPigs.

=== Kansas City Royals ===
On July 15, 2016, Mujica signed a minor league contract with the Kansas City Royals. He was released on August 10.

=== Minnesota Twins ===
On August 19, 2016, Mujica signed a minor league contract with the Minnesota Twins. He made six appearances for the Triple–A Rochester Red Wings, compiling a 1.35 ERA with eight strikeouts and three saves across 6 1/3 innings. Mujica elected free agency following the season on November 7.

=== Detroit Tigers ===
On January 10, 2017, Mujica signed a minor league contract with the Detroit Tigers that included an invitation to spring training. On August 3, he was recalled from the Toledo Mud Hens by Detroit to replace Michael Fulmer, who was placed on the 10-day disabled list. At the time of his recall, Mujica had appeared in 46 games for Toledo, posting a 1–1 record, 12 saves, and a 2.35 ERA in 56 innings. On August 13, the Tigers designated Mujica for assignment. He cleared waivers and was sent outright to Triple-A Toledo on August 15. He elected free agency on October 3.

=== St. Louis Cardinals (second stint) ===
On January 31, 2018, Mujica signed a minor league contract to return to the St. Louis Cardinals. He made 48 appearances for the Triple–A Memphis Redbirds, going 3–2 while logging a 3.68 ERA with 35 strikeouts and 13 saves across 51 1/3 innings pitched. Mujica elected free agency following the season on November 2.

== Pitching style ==
Mujica is mainly a two-pitch pitcher, utilizing a four-seam fastball at 90-93 mph and a splitter at 86-89. He also has a two-seam fastball in the same velocity range as his four-seamer, and a slider in the low 80s. Lefties see a very heavy diet of splitters; in 2011, they constituted more than half of the pitches he threw to left-handers. Right-handed hitters tend to see a greater assortment of pitches, including the slider (which Mujica rarely uses against lefties).

== See also ==
- List of Major League Baseball players from Venezuela
