= David Lough =

American baseball player (born 1986)

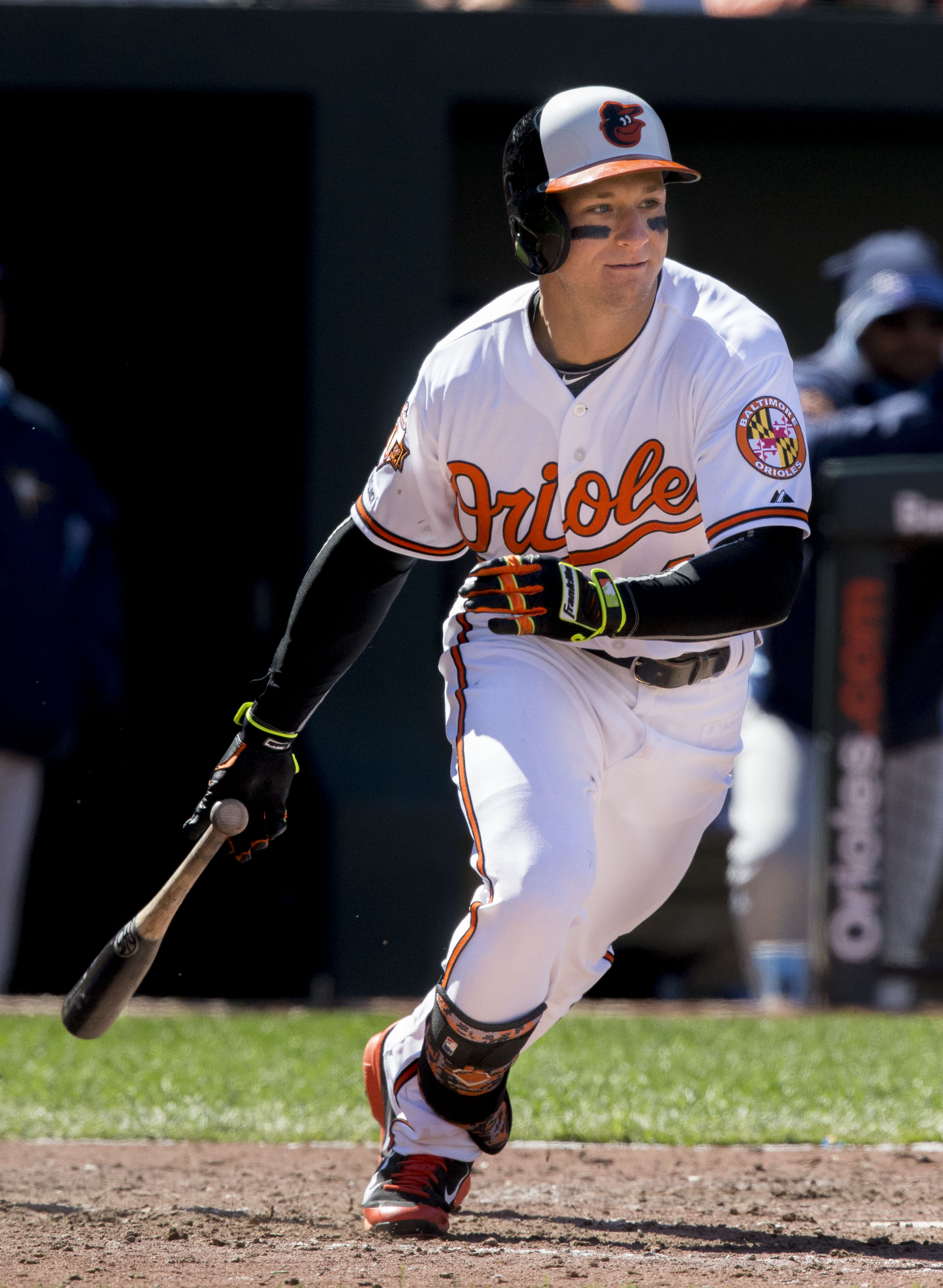
- Lough with the Baltimore Orioles in 2014
- Outfielder
- Born: January 20, 1986 (age 40); Akron, Ohio, U.S.
- Batted: Left Threw: Left

MLB debut
- September 1, 2012, for the Kansas City Royals

Last MLB appearance
- June 1, 2016, for the Philadelphia Phillies

MLB statistics
- Batting average: .254
- Home runs: 13
- Runs batted in: 67
- Stats at Baseball Reference

Teams
- Kansas City Royals (2012–2013); Baltimore Orioles (2014–2015); Philadelphia Phillies (2016)

David Dennis Lough (/loʊ/ loh; born January 20, 1986) is an American former professional baseball outfielder. He played in Major League Baseball (MLB) for the Kansas City Royals, Baltimore Orioles, and Philadelphia Phillies. While primarily used in left field throughout his career, Lough played in all outfield positions.

== Baseball career ==
=== Amateur career ===
A graduate of Green High School, Lough attended Mercyhurst College and played college baseball and college football for the Mercyhurst Lakers in the National Collegiate Athletic Association's Division II. For the baseball team, Lough recorded batting averages of .409 and .404 in his sophomore and junior years. As a wide receiver for the football team, Lough had 16 receptions for 223 yards in his junior year.

=== Kansas City Royals ===
Lough was drafted by the Kansas City Royals in the 11th round of the 2007 Major League Baseball draft. Lough made his major league debut September 1, 2012 against the Minnesota Twins. On June 11, 2013, Lough hit his first Major League home run off Detroit Tigers starter Max Scherzer. On June 30, 2013, Lough became only the sixth Royal to get four extra base hits in a game, joining George Brett, Hal McRae, Lonnie Smith, Johnny Damon and Jac Caglianone. His strong play in 2013 (.286 AVG with 5 HR's and 33 RBI over 96 games) helped him finish 8th in American League Rookie of the Year voting.

=== Baltimore Orioles ===
Lough (right) with teammate Travis Snider in February 2015.

On December 18, 2013, Lough was traded to the Baltimore Orioles in exchange for third baseman Danny Valencia. Lough played a late-inning utility role for the Orioles in 2014, appearing in 112 games and batting .247/.309/.385 with four home runs, 16 RBI, and eight stolen bases.

On April 13, 2015, the Orioles activated Lough from the disabled list so he could join the team full-time for the 2015 season. On April 25, in the tenth inning of a game against the Boston Red Sox, Lough hit a two-run walk off home run off of closer Koji Uehara to win the game 5-4. Lough was designated for assignment by the Orioles on August 14. He cleared waivers and was sent outright to the Triple-A Norfolk Tides on August 23. On September 24, the Orioles selected Lough's contract, adding him back to their active roster. In 84 total appearances for Baltimore, he slashed .201/.241/.313 with four home runs, 12 RBI, and two stolen bases. On December 3, the Orioles non-tendered Lough, making him a free agent.

=== Philadelphia Phillies ===
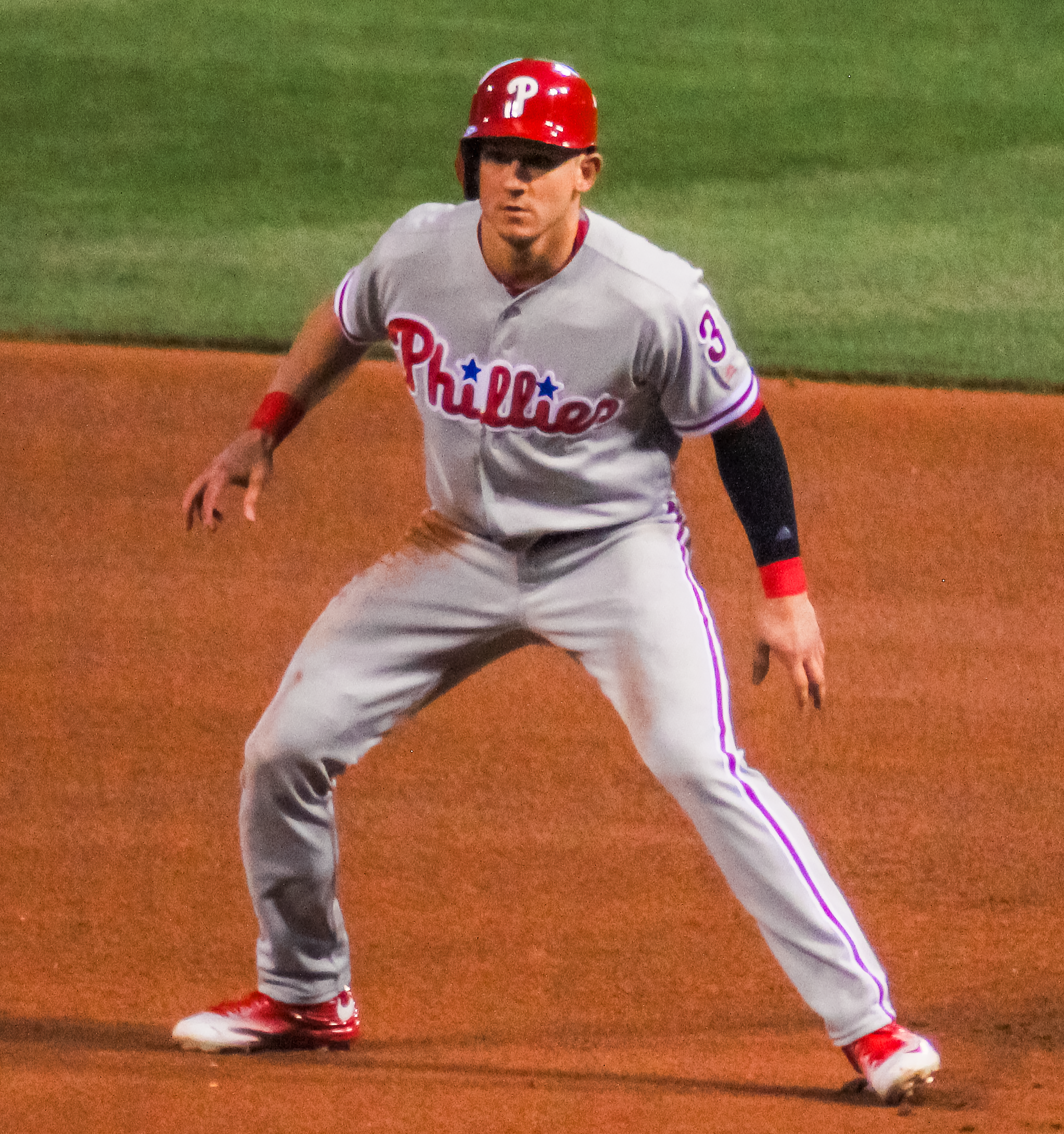
David Lough with the Phillies.

On January 25, 2016, Lough signed a minor league contract with the Philadelphia Phillies that included an invitation to spring training. On April 18, the Phillies selected Lough's contract, adding him to their active roster. He made his Phillies debut that evening. In 30 games for Philadelphia, Lough batted .239/.342/.313 with four RBI and one stolen base. On June 2, Lough was designated for assignment.

=== Detroit Tigers ===
On February 7, 2017, Lough signed a minor league contract with the Detroit Tigers that included an invitation to spring training. In 24 games for the Triple-A Toledo Mud Hens, he batted .170/.210/.203 with no home runs, RBI, or stolen bases. Lough was released by the Tigers organization on May 17.

=== Cleveland Indians ===
On May 23, 2017, Lough signed a minor league deal with the Cleveland Indians organization. Lough would play in only four games for the Triple–A Columbus Clippers on the year and elected free agency following the season on November 6.

== Personal life ==
Lough resides in his home town of Green, Ohio.
