= When AIDS Was Funny =

- Directed by: Scott Calonico
- Written by: Scott Calonico
- Produced by: Harmon Leon, Scott Calonico
- Release date: 2015
- Running time: 7:40 minutes
- Country: United Kingdom
- Language: English

When AIDS Was Funny is a 2015 British short documentary film by Scott Calonico.

== Summary ==
The film plays controversial audio of the White House's acting press spokesman, Larry Speakes, responding to questions by making homophobic jokes on the escalating AIDS epidemic by journalist Lester Kinsolving.

== Background ==
The audio recordings are from several of the Reagan administration's press conferences in the 1980s. The audio is juxtaposed with images of AIDS patients at Seattle's Bailey-Boushay House in the 1990s.

== 1982 exchange ==
The controversial dismissal of the growing AIDS epidemic is heard in the film through a series of press conferences in the 1980s, such as this 1982 exchange between Speakes and Kinsolving:

KINSOLVING: Larry, does the President have any reaction to the announcement—the Centers for Disease Control in Atlanta, that A-I-D-S is now an epidemic and have over 600 cases?

SPEAKES: What's A-I-D-S?

KINSOLVING: Over a third of them have died. It's known as "gay plague." (Laughter.) No, it is. I mean it's a pretty serious thing that one in every three people that get this have died. And I wondered if the President is aware of it?

SPEAKES: I don't have it. Do you? (Laughter.)

KINSOLVING: No, I don't.

SPEAKES: You didn't answer my question.

KINSOLVING: Well, I just wondered, does the President—

SPEAKES: How do you know? (Laughter.)

KINSOLVING: In other words, the White House looks on this as a great joke?

SPEAKES: No, I don't know anything about it, Lester.

KINSOLVING: Does the President, does anybody in the White House know about this epidemic, Larry?

SPEAKES: I don't think so. I don't think there's been any—

KINSOLVING: Nobody knows?

SPEAKES: There has been no personal experience here, Lester.

KINSOLVING: No, I mean, I thought you were keeping—

SPEAKES: I checked thoroughly with Dr. Ruge this morning and he's had no—(laughter)—no patients suffering from A-I-D-S or whatever it is.

KINSOLVING: The President doesn't have gay plague, is that what you're saying or what?

SPEAKES: No, I didn't say that.

KINSOLVING: Didn't say that?

SPEAKES: I thought I heard you on the State Department over there. Why didn't you stay there? (Laughter.)

KINSOLVING: Because I love you, Larry, that's why. (Laughter.)

SPEAKES: Oh, I see. Just don't put it in those terms, Lester. (Laughter.)

KINSOLVING: Oh, I retract that.

SPEAKES: I hope so.
