= Zach Clark =

American baseball player (born 1983)

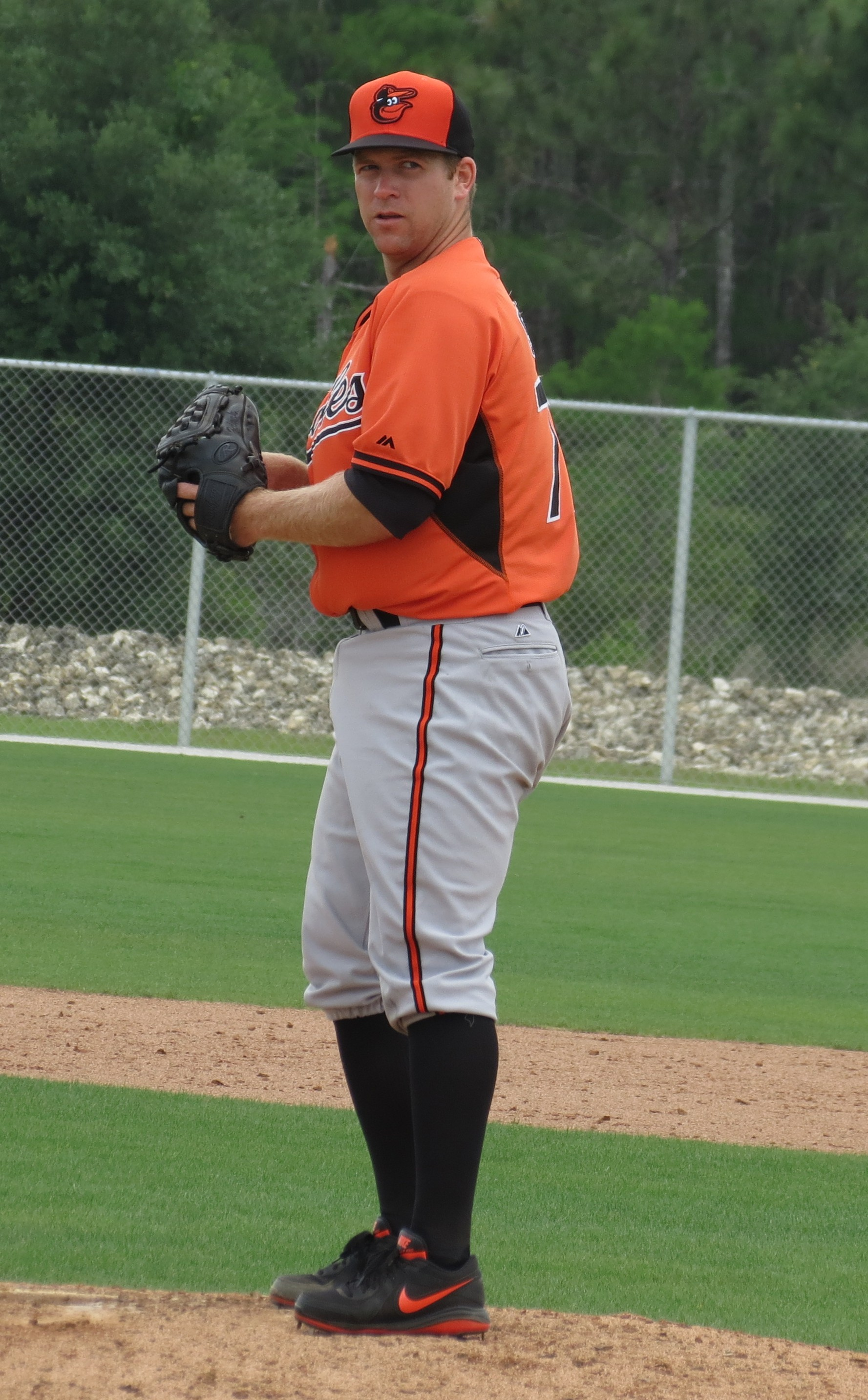
- Clark pitching for Baltimore Orioles extended spring training in 2014
- Pitcher
- Born: April 10, 1983 (age 43); Wilmington, Delaware, U.S.
- Batted: Right Threw: Right

MLB debut
- May 1, 2013, for the Baltimore Orioles

Last appearance
- May 1, 2013, for the Baltimore Orioles

MLB statistics
- Win–loss record: 0–0
- Earned run average: 16.20
- Strikeouts: 1
- Stats at Baseball Reference

Teams
- Baltimore Orioles (2013)

Zachary Higgins Clark (born April 10, 1983) is an American former professional baseball pitcher. He played in Major League Baseball (MLB) for the Baltimore Orioles in 2013.

== Playing career ==
Clark graduated from Newark High School in Newark, Delaware, in 2001. He then attended the University of Maryland, Baltimore County (UMBC), where he played college baseball for the UMBC Retrievers.

=== Baltimore Orioles ===
Clark went undrafted after graduating in 2006, and signed with the Baltimore Orioles as a free agent, receiving a $1,000 signing bonus. By 2010, Clark was promoted to the Norfolk Tides of the Triple-A International League, the highest level of minor league baseball.

Clark posted a strong breakout season in 2012 for the Bowie Baysox of the Double-A Eastern League and Norfolk, posting a 15-7 win–loss record with a 2.79 earned run average between the two teams. The Orioles added Clark to their 40-man roster after the 2012 season, in order to protect him from the Rule 5 draft.

Clark began the 2013 season with Norfolk. On May 1, 2013, Clark was called up to the Orioles, where he was expected to be a part of the bullpen. Clark made his major league debut that same night against the Seattle Mariners, coming on in relief of Wei-Yin Chen in the bottom of the 5th inning. He went 1 2/3 innings in his debut, allowing three hits and three earned runs. Clark was designated for assignment on May 4, 2013. He cleared waivers and was sent outright to Bowie on May 6, where he began developing a knuckleball. Clark experienced a hamstring injury, and struggled for the remainder of the season. Clark became a free agent at the end of the season, and re-signed with the Orioles on a new minor league contract.

The Orioles did not assign Clark to a minor league affiliate at the start of the 2014 season, as he worked on his knuckleball in extended spring training. In June, the Orioles opted not to assign Clark to the Aberdeen Ironbirds of the Low-A New York–Penn League, and instead released him.

=== Camden Riversharks ===
On June 25, 2014, Clark signed with the Camden Riversharks of the unaffiliated Atlantic League of Professional Baseball, and scrapped the knuckleball. In 7 starts for Camden, he posted a 2-3 record and 3.00 ERA with 21 strikeouts across 36 innings pitched.

Clark made 13 appearances (11 starts) for Camden in 2015, accumulating a 2-5 record and 6.56 ERA with 29 strikeouts across 60 1/3 innings pitched.

=== Somerset Patriots ===
On August 1, 2016, Clark signed with the Somerset Patriots of the Atlantic League of Professional Baseball. In 8 games (6 starts) for the Patriots, he posted a 2-1 record and 4.28 ERA with 12 strikeouts across 33 2/3 innings pitched. Clark became a free agent following the season.

== Post-playing career ==
After retiring from professional baseball, Clark was hired as a scout for the Houston Astros. He was let go in 2017 as part of restructuring by the organization.

Clark was soon after hired by the Tampa Bay Rays' scouting department, and currently serves as an Area Supervisor scout.
