= Jason Cortlund =

- Born: Jason Colacicco; Oakland, California, U.S.
- Occupations: film director, producer, screenwriter, editor, cinematographer
- Spouse: Julia Halperin

Jason Cortlund (born Jason Colacicco in Oakland, California, USA) is a director, writer and producer. He studied writing and film at the University of Oregon, received a master's degree in screenwriting from the University of Texas, and was a postgraduate fellow at the James Michener Center for Writers.

== Filmography ==
- 1997 : "Texas Pawn," Producer
- 2000 : "SuperDoll," Producer
- 2002 : "Nightstand," Producer, Editor, Director, Writer
- 2005 : "Once and Future Asshole," Producer
- 2006 : "Interstate (part one)," Director, Producer, Editor, Cinematographer
- 2007 : "Interstate (part two)," Director, Editor, Cinematographer
- 2010 : Daylight, Script supervisor
- 2012 : Now, Forager Writer, Director, Actor
- 2017 : Barracuda, Writer, Director
- 2023 : Crookedfinger Writer, Director,
