= Barracuda (2017 film) =

- Theatrical release poster
- Directed by: Jason Cortlund; Julia Halperin
- Written by: Jason Cortlund
- Produced by: David Hartstein; Nancy Schafer
- Starring: Allison Tolman; Sophie Reid; JoBeth Williams; Luis Bordonada; Larry Jack Dotson; Angelo Dylen
- Cinematography: Jonathan Nastasi
- Edited by: Eva Claire
- Music by: Chris Brokaw
- Production companies: Small Drama; Blue Suitcase Productions; Orka
- Distributed by: Orion Pictures; Samuel Goldwyn Films
- Release dates: March 11, 2017 (SXSW); October 6, 2017 (United States)
- Running time: 98 minutes
- Country: United States
- Language: English

Barracuda is a 2017 American drama thriller directed by Jason Cortlund and Julia Halperin and written by Jason Cortlund. The film stars Allison Tolman, Sophie Reid, JoBeth Williams, Luis Bordonada, Larry Jack Dotson and Angelo Dylen. The film was released on October 6, 2017, by Orion Pictures and Samuel Goldwyn Films.

== Plot ==
A British woman named Sinaloa comes to Texas to find Merle, her half-sister by way of their dead country musician father. It doesn’t take long for Sinaloa to charm her way into Merle’s life. Her singing awakens something in Merle and erases any lingering doubts about their shared bloodline; but an all-too-familiar chaos comes with it, which soon starts to unravel Merle’s stable world—her job, her upcoming marriage, and an already tense relationship with her mother, Patricia. While the family music legacy brought this stranger to town, darker motives are woven into the songs she sings, showing glimpses of a violent rage that’s been building for years.

== Cast ==
- Allison Tolman as Merle
- Sophie Reid as Sinaloa
- JoBeth Williams as Patricia
- Luis Bordonada as Raul
- Larry Jack Dotson as Spud
- Angelo Dylen as Ray
- Tanner Beard as Trace
- Monique Straw as Andrea

== Release ==
The film premiered at South by Southwest on March 11, 2017. On July 11, 2017, Orion Pictures and Samuel Goldwyn Films acquired distribution rights to the film. The film was released on October 6, 2017, by Orion Pictures and Samuel Goldwyn Films.

On the review aggregator website Rotten Tomatoes, 92% of 13 critics' reviews are positive, with an average rating of 6.5/10/10.
