= 2014 Chicago Cubs season =

2014 Chicago Cubs
- League: National League
- Division: Central
- Ballpark: Wrigley Field
- City: Chicago, Illinois
- Record: 73–89 (.451)
- Divisional place: 5th
- Owners: Tom Ricketts
- President of baseball operations: Theo Epstein
- General managers: Jed Hoyer
- Managers: Rick Renteria
- Television: WGN-TV; WGN America; CSN Chicago; CSN Chicago Plus; WCIU-TV (Len Kasper, Jim Deshaies, Luke Stuckmeyer)
- Radio: WGN (AM); Chicago Cubs Radio Network (Pat Hughes, Ron Coomer, Judd Sirott)
- Stats: ESPN.com; Baseball Reference

The 2014 Chicago Cubs season was the 143rd season of the franchise, the 139th in the National League and the 99th at Wrigley Field. The Cubs were managed by Rick Renteria in his only year as Cubs manager and played their home games at Wrigley Field as members of the National League Central.

The Cubs began the season on the road against the Pittsburgh Pirates on March 31, 2014 and finished the regular season on September 28, 2014, on the road against the Milwaukee Brewers.

The Cubs finished the season with a 73–89 record to finish in last place in the Central Division.

This season marked the 100th season of play at Wrigley Field, though the Cubs did not start playing there until 1916. To mark the occasion, the Cubs wore different uniforms to represent each decade during ten homestands throughout the season.

== Previous season ==
The Cubs finished the 2013 season 66–96 to finish in last place in the Central Division. Following the season, Dale Sveum was fired as manager on September 30, 2013. His total record with the Cubs in two years was 127–197. Rick Renteria was hired as the manager of the Chicago Cubs on November 7, 2013 and signed a three-year contract.

== Offseason ==
=== Spring training facilities ===
The Cubs opened a new spring training facility in Mesa, Arizona called Sloan Park. The park replaces HoHoKam Stadium which had been their spring training home since 1979. With a capacity of 15,000, Cubs Park becomes the largest spring training stadium by capacity in Major League Baseball, surpassing Camelback Ranch in Glendale.

== Regular season ==
=== Opening day starters ===
Monday, March 31, 2014 at Pittsburgh Pirates

Name	Pos.
Emilio Bonifacio	CF
Starlin Castro	SS
Darwin Barney	2B
Anthony Rizzo	1B
Nate Schierholtz	RF
Welington Castillo	C
Mike Olt	3B
Junior Lake	LF
Jeff Samardzija	SP

=== Season standings ===
==== National League Central ====
NL Central
Team	W	L	Pct.	GB	Home	Road
St. Louis Cardinals	90	72	.556	—	51‍–‍30	39‍–‍42
Pittsburgh Pirates	88	74	.543	2	51‍–‍30	37‍–‍44
Milwaukee Brewers	82	80	.506	8	42‍–‍39	40‍–‍41
Cincinnati Reds	76	86	.469	14	44‍–‍37	32‍–‍49
Chicago Cubs	73	89	.451	17	41‍–‍40	32‍–‍49

==== National League Wild Card ====
Division leaders
Team	W	L	Pct.
Washington Nationals	96	66	.593
Los Angeles Dodgers	94	68	.580
St. Louis Cardinals	90	72	.556

Wild Card teams (Top 2 teams qualify for postseason)
Team	W	L	Pct.	GB
Pittsburgh Pirates	88	74	.543	—
San Francisco Giants	88	74	.543	—
Milwaukee Brewers	82	80	.506	6
New York Mets	79	83	.488	9
Atlanta Braves	79	83	.488	9
Miami Marlins	77	85	.475	11
San Diego Padres	77	85	.475	11
Cincinnati Reds	76	86	.469	12
Philadelphia Phillies	73	89	.451	15
Chicago Cubs	73	89	.451	15
Colorado Rockies	66	96	.407	22
Arizona Diamondbacks	64	98	.395	24

=== Record vs. opponents ===
2014 National League record Source: MLB Standings Grid – 2014
Team	AZ	ATL	CHC	CIN	COL	LAD	MIA	MIL	NYM	PHI	PIT	SD	SF	STL	WSH	AL
Arizona	–	3–3	5–2	3–4	9–10	4–15	3–4	3–4	2–4	2–4	3–4	12–7	6–13	1–5	1–6	7–13
Atlanta	3–3	–	5–1	5–2	4–3	1–6	9–10	5–2	9–10	11–8	3–4	3–4	1–5	2–4	11–8	7–13
Chicago	2–5	1–5	–	8–11	5–2	3–4	4–2	11–8	5–2	3–3	5–14	3–4	2–4	9–10	3–4	9–11
Cincinnati	4–3	2–5	11–8	–	3–4	3–4	4–3	10–9	2–4	3–3	12–7	1–5	5–2	7–12	3–3	6–14
Colorado	10–9	3–4	2–5	4–3	–	6–13	3–4	1–6	3–4	3–3	2–4	10–9	10–9	1–5	1–5	7–13
Los Angeles	15–4	6–1	4–3	4–3	13–6	–	3–3	1–5	4–2	3–4	2–5	12–7	10–9	4–3	2–4	11–9
Miami	4–3	10–9	2–4	3–4	4–3	3–3	–	3–4	8–11	9–10	2–4	3–4	3–4	4–2	6–13	13–7
Milwaukee	4–3	2–5	8–11	9–10	6–1	5–1	4–3	–	4–3	3–4	12–7	3–3	2–4	7–12	2–4	11–9
New York	4–2	10–9	2–5	4–2	4–3	2–4	11–8	3–4	–	13–6	3–4	3–3	1–6	4–3	4–15	11–9
Philadelphia	4–2	8–11	3–3	3–3	3–3	4–3	10–9	4–3	6–13	–	1–6	4–3	2–5	4–3	10–9	7–13
Pittsburgh	4–3	4–3	14–5	7–12	4–2	5–2	4–2	7–12	4–3	6–1	–	3–3	4–2	8–11	3–4	11–9
San Diego	7–12	4–3	4–3	5–1	9–10	7–12	4–3	3–3	3–3	3–4	3–3	–	10–9	3–4	3–4	9–11
San Francisco	13–6	5–1	4–2	2–5	9–10	9–10	4–3	4–2	6–1	5–2	2–4	9–10	–	4–3	2–5	10–10
St. Louis	5–1	4–2	10–9	12–7	5–1	3–4	2–4	12–7	3–4	3–4	11–8	4–3	3–4	–	5–2	8–12
Washington	6–1	8–11	4–3	3–3	5–1	4–2	13–6	4–2	15–4	9–10	4–3	4–3	5–2	2–5	–	10–10

==== Detailed record vs. opponents ====
**National League**
Opponent	W	L	PER	RS	RA
**NL East**
Atlanta Braves	1	5	0.167	22	35
Miami Marlins	4	2	0.667	29	20
New York Mets	5	2	0.714	25	21
Philadelphia Phillies	3	3	0.500	19	20
Washington Nationals	3	4	0.429	22	32
Total	16	14	0.500	117	128
**NL Central**
**Chicago Cubs**	—				
Cincinnati Reds	8	11	0.421	69	78
Milwaukee Brewers	11	8	0.579	71	60
Pittsburgh Pirates	5	14	0.263	63	89
St. Louis Cardinals	9	10	0.474	87	93
Total	32	43	0.434	290	320
**NL West**
Arizona Diamondbacks	2	5	0.286	30	32
Colorado Rockies	5	2	0.714	31	31
Los Angeles Dodgers	3	4	0.429	39	47
San Diego Padres	3	4	0.429	24	39
San Francisco Giants	2	4	0.333	16	27
Total	14	18	0.455	135	168
**American League**
Baltimore Orioles	3	0	1.000	13	4
Boston Red Sox	3	0	1.000	20	10
Chicago White Sox	1	3	0.250	17	21
New York Yankees	1	3	0.250	8	10
Tampa Bay Rays	1	2	0.333	6	10
Toronto Blue Jays	0	3	0.000	3	28
Total	9	11	0.450	67	83

Month	Games	W	L	PER	RS	RA
March/April	26	9	17	0.346	99	108
May	27	11	16	0.407	108	108
June	28	15	13	0.536	98	101
July	26	10	16	0.385	107	141
August	30	16	14	0.533	111	120
September	25	12	13	0.480	91	129
Home	81	41	40	0.506	308	329
Away	81	32	49	0.395	306	378
Total	162	73	89	0.451	614	707

=== Game log ===
2014 game log: 73–89 (Home: 41–40; Away: 32–49)
March: 0–1 (Home: 0–0; Away: 0–1)

#	Date	Opponent	Score	Win	Loss	Save	Attendance	Record
1	March 31	@ Pirates	L 0–1 (10)	Morris (1–0)	**Villanueva** (0–1)		39,833	0–1

April: 9–16 (Home: 5–8; Away: 4–9)

#	Date	Opponent	Score	Win	Loss	Save	Attendance	Record
2	April 2	@ Pirates	L 3–4 (16)	Pimentel (1–0)	**Villanueva** (0–2)		29,762	0–2
3	April 3	@ Pirates	**W** 3–2	**Hammel** (1–0)	Rodríguez (0–1)	**Strop** (1)	11,418	1–2
4	April 4	Phillies	L 2–7	Hernández (1–0)	**Wood** (0–1)		38,283	1–3
5	April 5	Phillies	L 0–2	Lee (2–0)	**Samardzija** (0–1)	Papelbon (1)	30,651	1–4
6	April 6	Phillies	**W** 8–3	**Villanueva** (1–2)	Burnett (0–1)		26,712	2–4
7	April 8	Pirates	L 6–7	Watson (2–0)	**Strop** (0–1)	Grilli (2)	26,177	2–5
8	April 9	Pirates	**W** 7–5	**Hammel** (2–0)	Rodríguez (0–2)		28,247	3–5
9	April 10	Pirates	L 4–5	Cole (2–0)	**Russell** (0–1)	Grilli (3)	25,502	3–6
10	April 11	@ Cardinals	**W** 6–3	**Grimm** (1–0)	Rosenthal (0–1)	**Rondón** (1)	43,903	4–6
11	April 12	@ Cardinals	L 4–10	Wainwright (2–1)	**Villanueva** (1–3)		45,302	4–7
12	April 13	@ Cardinals	L 4–6	Wacha (2–0)	**Jackson** (0–1)	Rosenthal (4)	44,135	4–8
—	April 15	@ Yankees	**Postponed (inclement weather)** (Makeup date: April 16)					
13	April 16	@ Yankees	L 0–3	Tanaka (2–0)	**Hammel** (2–1)	Kelley (4)	36,569	4–9
14	April 16	@ Yankees	L 0–2	Pineda (2–1)	**Wood** (0–2)	Warren (1)	40,073	4–10
15	April 18	Reds	L 1–4	Simón (2–1)	**Samardzija** (0–2)	Broxton (2)	28,699	4–11
16	April 19	Reds	**W** 8–4	**Jackson** (1–1)	Cingrani (1–2)		32,966	5–11
17	April 20	Reds	L 2–8	Bailey (1–1)	**Villanueva** (1–4)		27,927	5–12
18	April 21	Diamondbacks	**W** 5–1	**Wood** (1–2)	Arroyo (1–2)		32,439	6–12
19	April 22	Diamondbacks	**W** 9–2	**Hammel** (3–1)	McCarthy (0–4)		35,381	7–12
20	April 23	Diamondbacks	L 5–7	Cahill (1–4)	**Strop** (0–2)	Reed (4)	32,323	7–13
21	April 24	Diamondbacks	L 2–5	Bolsinger (1–1)	**Jackson** (1–2)	Reed (5)	33,085	7–14
22	April 25	@ Brewers	L 2–5	Garza (1–2)	**Villanueva** (1–5)	Rodríguez (10)	32,868	7–15
23	April 26	@ Brewers	L 3–5	Estrada (2–1)	**Wood** (1–3)	Rodríguez (11)	40,008	7–16
24	April 27	@ Brewers	**W** 4–0	**Hammel** (4–1)	Peralta (3–1)		45,286	8–16
—	April 28	@ Reds	**Postponed (inclement weather)** (Makeup date: July 8)					
25	April 29	@ Reds	L 2–3	Simón (4–1)	**Samardzija** (0–3)	Broxton (5)	17,579	8–17
26	April 30	@ Reds	**W** 9–4	**Jackson** (2–2)	Christiani (0–1)		21,847	9–17

May: 11–16 (Home: 5–5; Away: 6–11)

#	Date	Opponent	Score	Win	Loss	Save	Attendance	Record
27	May 2	Cardinals	**W** 6–5	**Wood** (2–3)	Wainwright (5–2)	**Rondón** (2)	28,160	10–17
28	May 3	Cardinals	**W** 3–0	**Schlitter** (1–0)	Wacha (2–3)	**Rondón** (3)	37,874	11–17
29	May 4	Cardinals	L 4–5	Siegrist (1–1)	**Rondón** (0–1)	Rosenthal (8)	30,023	11–18
30	May 5	White Sox	L 1–3 (12)	Webb (3–0)	**Grimm** (1–1)	Lindstrom (5)	33,146	11–19
31	May 6	White Sox	L 1–5	Putnam (1–0)	**Ramirez** (0–1)		34,305	11–20
32	May 7	@ White Sox	L 3–8	Danks (3–2)	**Wood** (2–4)		21,075	11–21
33	May 8	@ White Sox	**W** 12–5	**Schlitter** (2–0)	Carroll (1–2)		26,332	12–21
34	May 9	@ Braves	L 2–3 (10)	Wood (3–5)	**Wright** (0–1)		27,145	12–22
35	May 10	@ Braves	L 0–2	Santana (4–0)	**Schlitter** (2–1)	Kimbrel (10)	30,658	12–23
36	May 11	@ Braves	L 2–5	Harang (4–3)	**Jackson** (2–3)	Carpenter (2)	26,151	12–24
37	May 12	@ Cardinals	**W** 17–5	**Wood** (3–4)	Lyons (0–3)		44,434	13–24
38	May 13	@ Cardinals	L 3–4 (12)	Maness (1–2)	**Grimm** (1–2)		43,627	13–25
—	May 14	@ Cardinals	**Postponed (inclement weather)** (Makeup date: August 30)					
39	May 15	@ Cardinals	L 3–5	Wacha (3–3)	**Hammel** (4–2)	Rosenthal (11)	42,501	13–26
40	May 16	Brewers	L 3–4	Lohse (5–1)	**Samardzija** (0–4)	Rodríguez (17)	35,771	13–27
41	May 17	Brewers	**W** 3–0	**Jackson** (3–3)	Garza (2–4)	**Rondón** (4)	36,671	14–27
42	May 18	Brewers	**W** 4–2	**Wood** (4–4)	Estrada (3–2)	**Rondón** (5)	37,631	15–27
43	May 20	Yankees	**W** 6–1	**Hammel** (5–2)	Tanaka (6–1)		38,753	16–27
44	May 21	Yankees	L 2–4 (13)	Claiborne (2–0)	**Veras** (0–1)	Robertson (9)	34,808	16–28
45	May 22	@ Padres	**W** 5–1	**Arrieta** (1–0)	Stults (2–5)	**Villanueva** (1)	21,263	17–28
46	May 23	@ Padres	L 1–11	Stauffer (2–0)	**Jackson** (3–4)		26,489	17–29
47	May 24	@ Padres	**W** 3–2	**Wood** (5–4)	Buckner (0–1)	**Rondón** (6)	42,107	18–29
48	May 25	@ Padres	L 3–4	Kennedy (3–6)	**Hammel** (5–3)	Street (14)	32,167	18–30
49	May 26	@ Giants	**W** 8–4	**Samardzija** (1–4)	Petit (3–2)		42,257	19–30
50	May 27	@ Giants	L 0–4	Hudson (5–2)	**Arrieta** (1–1)		41,060	19–31
51	May 28	@ Giants	L 0–5	Kontos (1–0)	**Jackson** (3–5)		41,186	19–32
52	May 30	@ Brewers	L 5–11	Estrada (5–2)	**Wood** (5–5)		36,100	19–33
53	May 31	@ Brewers	**W** 8-0	**Hammel** (6–3)	Peralta (4–5)		42,332	20–33

June: 14–13 (Home: 9–7; Away: 5–6)

#	Date	Opponent	Score	Win	Loss	Save	Attendance	Record
54	June 1	@ Brewers	L 0–9	Lohse (7–1)	**Samardzija** (1–5)		36,277	20–34
55	June 3	Mets	**W** 2–1	**Rondón** (1–1)	Rice (1–2)		34,697	21–34
56	June 4	Mets	**W** 5–4	**Jackson** (4–5)	Eveland (0–1)	**Rondón** (7)	28,185	22–34
57	June 5	Mets	**W** 7–4	**Grimm** (2–2)	Black (1–1)	**Ramirez** (1)	28,833	23–34
58	June 6	Marlins	**W** 5–3 (13)	**Villanueva** (2–5)	Slowey (1–1)		28,495	24–34
59	June 7	Marlins	**W** 5–2	**Samardzija** (2–5)	Wolf (1–2)	**Strop** (2)	33,786	25–34
60	June 8	Marlins	L 3–4	Dunn (5–3)	**Strop** (0–3)	Cishek (14)	33,134	25–35
61	June 9	@ Pirates	L 2–6	Morton (3–7)	**Jackson** (4–6)		24,075	25–36
62	June 10	@ Pirates	**W** 7–3	**Wood** (6–5)	Sadler (0–1)		31,567	26–36
63	June 11	@ Pirates	L 2–4	Cumpton (2–2)	**Hammel** (6–4)	Grilli (10)	20,540	26–37
64	June 12	@ Pirates	L 0–4	Vólquez (4–5)	**Samardzija** (2–6)		25,431	26–38
65	June 13	@ Phillies	**W** 2–1	**Arrieta** (2–1)	Hernández (2–5)	**Ramirez** (2)	26,154	27–38
66	June 14	@ Phillies	L 4–7	Buchanan (2–3)	**Jackson** (4–7)	Papelbon (15)	31,524	27–39
67	June 15	@ Phillies	**W** 3–0	**Wood** (7–5)	Burnett (4–6)	**Ramirez** (3)	41,238	28–39
68	June 16	@ Marlins	**W** 5–4	**Villanueva** (3–5)	Turner (2–5)	**Russell** (1)	19,170	29–39
69	June 17	@ Marlins	L 5–6	Dyson (1–0)	**Schlitter** (2–2)	Cishek (16)	20,860	29–40
70	June 18	@ Marlins	**W** 6–1	**Arrieta** (3–1)	Eovaldi (4–3)		27,032	30–40
71	June 20	Pirates	**W** 6–3	**Jackson** (5–7)	Morton (4–8)	**Rondón** (8)	36,423	31–40
72	June 21	Pirates	L 3–5	Worley (1–0)	**Wood** (7–6)	Melancon (11)	36,563	31–41
73	June 22	Pirates	L 1–2	Cumpton (3–2)	**Hammel** (6–5)	Melancon (12)	33,573	31–42
74	June 23	Reds	L 1–6	Broxton (3–0)	**Rondón** (1–2)		27,747	31–43
75	June 24	Reds	**W** 7–3	**Arrieta** (4–1)	Bailey (7–4)	—	28,226	32–43
76	June 25	Reds	L 1–4	Latos (1–0)	**Jackson** (5–8)	Chapman (14)	28,207	32–44
77	June 26	Nationals	**W** 5–3	**Ramirez** (1–1)	Stammen (0–3)	**Rondón** (9)	28,867	33–44
78	June 27	Nationals	**W** 7–2	**Hammel** (7–5)	Roark (7–5)		30,683	34–44
79	June 28	Nationals	L 0–3	Gonzalez (5–4)	**Beeler** (0–1)	Soriano (19)	35,770	34–45
80	June 28	Nationals	L 2–7	Treinen (1–3)	**Samardzija** (2–7)	Detwiler (1)	32,267	34–46
81	June 30	@ Red Sox	**W** 2–0	**Arrieta** (5–1)	Peavy (1–7)	Rondon (10)	37,814	35–46

July: 10–16 (Home: 6–7; Away: 4–9)

#	Date	Opponent	Score	Win	Loss	Save	Attendance	Record
82	July 1	@ Red Sox	**W** 2–1	**Strop** (1–3)	Uehara (3–2)	**Rondón** (11)	36,748	36–46
83	July 2	@ Red Sox	**W** 16–9	**Villanueva** (4–5)	Workman (1–2)		37,055	37–46
84	July 4	@ Nationals	**W** 7–2	**Hammel** (8–5)	Roark (7–6)		41,274	38–46
85	July 5	@ Nationals	L 0–13	González (6–4)	**Villanueva** (4–6)		38,473	38–47
86	July 6	@ Nationals	L 1–2	Clippard (6–2)	**Strop** (1–4)	Soriano (21)	32,941	38–48
87	July 7	@ Reds	L 3–9	Leake (7–7)	**Jackson** (5–9)		26,558	38–49
88	July 8	@ Reds	L 2–4	Cueto (9–6)	**Wood** (7–7)	Chapman (18)	17,371	38–50
89	July 8	@ Reds	L 5–6	Ondrusek (3–2)	**Rondón** (1–3)		29,991	38–51
90	July 9	@ Reds	L 1–4	Simón (12–3)	**Beeler** (0–2)	Chapman (19)	32,810	38–52
91	July 10	@ Reds	**W** 6–4	**Parker** (1–0)	Hoover (1–6)		31,983	39–52
92	July 11	Braves	**W** 5–4	**Rondón** (2–3)	Walden (0–1)		39,544	40–52
93	July 12	Braves	L 6–11	Minor (3–5)	**Jackson** (5–10)	Carpenter (3)	36,806	40–53
94	July 13	Braves	L 7–10	Teherán (9–6)	**Wood** (7–8)	Kimbrel (29)	36,363	40–54
**85th All-Star Game in Minneapolis, Minnesota**
95	July 18	@ Diamondbacks	L 4–5	De La Rosa (1–0)	**Schlitter** (2–3)	Reed (22)	32,619	40–55
96	July 19	@ Diamondbacks	L 3–9	Miley (6–6)	**Wood** (7–9)		32,528	40–56
97	July 20	@ Diamondbacks	L 2–3	Collmenter (8–5)	**Arrieta** (5–2)	Reed (23)	37,131	40–57
98	July 22	Padres	**W** 6–0	**Hendricks** (1–0)	Stults (3–12)		32,730	41–57
99	July 23	Padres	L 3–8	Kennedy (8–9)	**Wada** (0–1)		30,718	41–58
100	July 24	Padres	L 3–13	Ross (9–10)	**Jackson** (5–11)		31,321	41–59
101	July 25	Cardinals	**W** 7–6	**Grimm** (3–2)	Siegrist (1–2)	**Rondón** (12)	41,534	42–59
102	July 26	Cardinals	L 3–6	Choate (2–2)	**Russell** (0–2)	Rosenthal (31)	41,927	42–60
103	July 27	Cardinals	L 0–1	Wainwright (13–5)	**Hendricks** (1–1)	Rosenthal (32)	35,256	42–61
104	July 28	Rockies	**W** 4–1	**Wada** (1–1)	Flande (0–3)	**Rondón** (13)	29,702	43–61
105	July 29	Rockies	**W** 4–3 (16)	**Baker** (1–0)	Matzek (2–5)		28,590	44–61
106	July 30	Rockies	L 4–6 (10)	Scahill (1–0)	**Wright** (0–2)	Ottavino (1)	29,491	44–62
107	July 31	Rockies	**W** 3–1	**Arrieta** (6–2)	Hernández (0–1)	Rondón (14)	35,729	45–62

August: 16–14 (Home: 7–6; Away: 9–8)

#	Date	Opponent	Score	Win	Loss	Save	Attendance	Record
108	August 1	@ Dodgers	**W** 8–2	**Hendricks** (2–1)	Haren (8–9)		47,900	46–62
109	August 2	@ Dodgers	L 2–5 (12)	Wright (4–2)	**Parker** (1–1)		53,354	46–63
110	August 3	@ Dodgers	**W** 7–3	**Jackson** (6–11)	Beckett (6–6)		44,713	47–63
111	August 5	@ Rockies	**W** 6–5 (12)	**Rondón** (3–3)	Logan (2–2)	**Villanueva** (2)	35,043	48–63
112	August 6	@ Rockies	L 4–13	Lyles (6–1)	**Arrieta** (6–3)		35,804	48–64
113	August 7	@ Rockies	**W** 6–2	**Hendricks** (3–1)	Flande (0–4)		32,585	49–64
114	August 8	Rays	L 3–4	Boxberger (3–1)	**Rondón** (3–4)		34,937	49–65
115	August 9	Rays	L 0–4	Odorizzi (8–9)	**Jackson** (6–12)		36,739	49–66
116	August 10	Rays	**W** 3–2 (12)	**Villanueva** (5–6)	Ramos (2–4)		33,039	50–66
117	August 11	Brewers	L 1–3	Gallardo (7–6)	**Arrieta** (6–4)	Rodríguez (36)	28,927	50–67
118	August 12	Brewers	**W** 3–0	**Hendricks** (4–1)	Peralta (14–7)	**Rondón** (15)	28,819	51–67
119	August 13	Brewers	**W** 4–2	**Wada** (2–1)	Lohse (11–7)	**Rondón** (16)	31,191	52–67
120	August 14	Brewers	L 2–6	Fiers (2–1)	**Jackson** (6–13)		38,157	52–68
121	August 15	@ Mets	L 2–3	Wheeler (8–8)	**Wood** (7–10)	Mejía (18)	25,016	52–69
122	August 16	@ Mets	L 3–7	Niese (7–8)	**Straily** (1–3)		30,744	52–70
123	August 17	@ Mets	**W** 2–1	**Strop** (2–4)	Mejía (5–6)	**Rondon** (17)	27,938	53–70
124	August 18	@ Mets	**W** 4–1	**Hendricks** (5–1)	Carlyle (1–1)	**Rondon** (18)	23,271	54–70
125	August 19	Giants	**W** 2–1	**Wada** (3–1)	Vogelsong (7–9)	**Rondon** (19)	31,064	55–70
126	August 20	Giants	L 3–8	Peavy (3–12)	**Jackson** (6–14)		30,633	55–71
127	August 21	Giants	L 3–5	Bumgarner (14–9)	**Wood** (7–11)	Casilla (11)	30,541	55–72
128	August 22	Orioles	**W** 4–1	**Arrieta** (7–4)	Gausman (7–5)	**Rondon** (20)	33,761	56–72
129	August 23	Orioles	**W** 7–2	**Grimm** (4–2)	Norris (11–8)		37,156	57–72
130	August 24	Orioles	**W** 2–1	**Wada** (4–1)	Gonzalez (6–7)	**Rondon** (21)	32,774	58–72
131	August 26	@ Reds	**W** 3–0	**Wood** (8-11)	Cueto (15-8)	**Rondon** (22)	19,481	59–72
132	August 27	@ Reds	L 5–7	Latos (5-3)	**Turner** (4-8)	Chapman (28)	20,497	59-73
133	August 28	@ Reds	L 2–7	Axelrod (1-0)	**Arrieta** (7-5)		21,316	59–74
134	August 29	@ Cardinals	**W** 7–2	**Ramirez** (2-1)	Neshek (6-1)		43,181	60–74
135	August 30	@ Cardinals	**W** 5–1	**Doubront** (1-0)	Masterson (2-3)		44,755	61–74
136	August 30	@ Cardinals	L 13–2	Gonzales (1-2)	**Wada** (4-2)		44,762	61–75
137	August 31	@ Cardinals	L 9–6	Neshek (7-1)	**Villanueva** (5-7)	Rosenthal (40)	45,148	61–76

September: 12–13 (Home: 9–7; Away: 3–6)

#	Date	Opponent	Score	Win	Loss	Save	Attendance	Record
138	September 1	Brewers	**W** 4–2	**Turner** (5-8)	Nelson (2-6)	**Rondon** (23)	32,054	62–76
139	September 2	Brewers	**W** 7–1	**Arrieta** (8-5)	Gallardo (8-8)		28,434	63–76
140	September 3	Brewers	**W** 6–2	**Hendricks** (6–1)	Garza (7–8)		31,251	64–76
141	September 5	Pirates	L 3–5 (11)	Melancon (3–4)	**Wright** (0–3)	Holdzkom (1)	35,541	64–77
142	September 6	Pirates	L 0–5	Liriano (4–10)	**Doubront** (3–5)		36,867	64–78
143	September 7	Pirates	L 4–10	Cole (8–5)	**Wood** (8–12)		33,894	64–79
144	September 8	@ Blue Jays	L 0–8	Stroman (10–5)	**Turner** (5–9)		16,879	64–80
145	September 9	@ Blue Jays	L 2–9	Buehrle (12–9)	**Ramirez** (2–2)		17,903	64–81
146	September 10	@ Blue Jays	L 1–11	Hutchison (10–11)	**Hendricks** (6–2)		19,411	64–82
147	September 12	@ Pirates	L 3–7	Cole (9–5)	**Wada** (4–3)		35,638	64–83
148	September 13	@ Pirates	**W** 6–4	**Doubront** (4–5)	Locke (7–5)	**Rondón** (24)	38,024	65–83
149	September 14	@ Pirates	L 3–7	Vólquez (12-7)	**Turner** (5-10)		37,655	65-84
150	September 15	Reds	**W** 1–0	**Rondón** (4–4)	Villarreal (0–1)		33,144	66–84
151	September 16	Reds	**W** 7–0	**Arrieta** (9–5)	Cueto (18–5)		33,812	67–84
152	September 17	Reds	**W** 3–1	**Hendricks** (7–2)	Corcino (0–1)	**Rondón** (25)	33,500	68–84
153	September 18	Dodgers	L 4–8	Rodriguez (1–0)	**Ramirez** (2–3)		33,649	68–85
154	September 19	Dodgers	L 5–14	Kershaw (20–3)	**Jackson** (6–15)		33,322	68–86
155	September 20	Dodgers	**W** 8–7	**Grimm** (5–2)	Wilson (2–4)	**Rondón** (26)	34,334	69–86
156	September 21	Dodgers	L 5–8	Perez (1–3)	**Turner** (5–11)	Jansen (43)	31,933	69–87
157	September 22	Cardinals	L 0–8	Wainwright (20–9)	**Wood** (8–13)		28,893	69–88
158	September 23	Cardinals	**W** 4–3	**Rosscup** (1–0)	Neshek (7–2)		29,754	70–88
159	September 24	Cardinals	**W** 3–1	**Arrieta** (10–5)	Lackey (14–10)	**Rondón** (27)	33,292	71–88
160	September 26	@ Brewers	**W** 6–4	**Ramirez** (3–3)	Nelson (2–9)	**Rondón** (28)	39,880	72–88
161	September 27	@ Brewers	L 2–1	Peralta (17–11)	**Wada** (4–4)	Rodríguez (44)	41,440	72–89
162	September 28	@ Brewers	**W** 5–2	**Turner** (6–11)	Fiers (6–5)	**Rondón** (29)	33,837	73–89

Legend: = Win = Loss = Postponement
Bold = Cubs team member

Note: The Cubs finished their first winning season at Wrigley Field since 2009 with a record of 41–40. 2,652,113 fans attended Cubs home games which was the best since the 2008 season.

=== Transactions ===
- The Cubs traded Jason Hammel and Jeff Samardzija on July 5 to the Oakland A's for minor leaguers Addison Russell, Billy McKinney and major league pitcher Dan Straily. Russell was considered a top-five prospect in baseball.
- On July 28, Darwin Barney was traded to the Los Angeles Dodgers for minor league pitcher Jonathan Martinez.
- On July 30, the Cubs acquired Félix Doubront from the Boston Red Sox.
- On July 31, pitcher James Russell and infielder Emilio Bonifacio were traded to the Atlanta Braves for 20-year-old catcher Victor Caratini.
- On August 15, the Cubs traded outfielder Brett Jackson to the Arizona Diamondbacks for pitcher Blake Cooper.

== Roster ==
2014 Chicago Cubs
Roster
Pitchers: 49 Jake Arrieta; 32 Dallas Beeler; 22 Félix Doubront; 11 Kyuji Fujikawa; 52 Justin Grimm; 39 Jason Hammel; 28 Kyle Hendricks; 36 Edwin Jackson; 43 Eric Jokisch; 50 Blake Parker; 54 Neil Ramirez; 56 Héctor Rondón; 59 Zach Rosscup; 18 Chris Rusin; 40 James Russell; 29 Jeff Samardzija; 63 Brian Schlitter; 19 Dan Straily; 46 Pedro Strop; 38 Jacob Turner; 41 José Veras; 33 Carlos Villanueva; 47 Arodys Vizcaíno; 67 Tsuyoshi Wada; 37 Travis Wood; 53 Wesley Wright	Catchers: 12 John Baker; 5 Welington Castillo; 51 Rafael Lopez; 30 Eli Whiteside; Infielders: 9 Javier Báez; 15 Darwin Barney; 13 Starlin Castro; 30 Mike Olt; 44 Anthony Rizzo; 24 Luis Valbuena; 4 Chris Valaika; 22,45 Logan Watkins	Outfielders: 7 Arismendy Alcántara; 64 Emilio Bonifacio; 8 Chris Coghlan; 51,61 Ryan Kalish; 21 Junior Lake; 20 Justin Ruggiano; 19 Nate Schierholtz; 68 Jorge Soler; 6 Ryan Sweeney; 41 Matt Szczur	Manager: 16 Rick Renteria; Coaching Staff: 58 Mike Borzello (catching); 25 Chris Bosio (pitching); 96 Mike Brumley (assistant hitting); 74 Jose Castro (quality assurance); 77 Eric Hinske (first base); 17 Brandon Hyde (bench); 1 Gary Jones (third base); 3 Bill Mueller (hitting); 95 Chad Noble (bullpen catcher); 35 Lester Strode (bullpen)

== Statistics ==
=== Batting ===
Note: G = Games played; AB = At bats; R = Runs scored; H = Hits; 2B = Doubles; 3B = Triples; HR = Home runs; Avg. = Batting average; RBI = Runs batted in; SB = Stolen bases

Player	G	AB	R	H	2B	3B	HR	RBI	AVG	SB
Arismendy Alcántara	59	238	28	51	8	1	9	22	.214	8
Javier Baez	38	155	19	27	6	0	9	18	.174	3
John Baker	63	169	9	33	7	0	0	13	.195	0
Darwin Barney	72	129	18	47	10	2	2	16	.217	1
Emilio Bonifacio	69	276	35	77	14	3	2	18	.279	14
Welington Castillo	101	352	25	86	19	0	11	42	.244	0
Starlin Castro	134	528	58	154	33	1	14	65	.292	4
Chris Coghlan	111	337	40	91	23	5	6	31	.270	6
Ryan Kalish	45	102	12	24	2	4	0	4	.235	3
Junior Lake	103	300	30	63	10	3	9	25	.210	7
Raffy Lopez	7	11	0	2	0	0	0	1	.182	0
Mike Olt	80	212	21	33	7	0	12	32	.156	0
Anthony Rizzo	129	486	81	135	23	1	30	71	.278	4
Justin Ruggiano	81	224	29	63	13	1	6	28	.281	2
Nate Schierholtz	99	313	29	60	10	3	6	33	.192	4
Jorge Soler	12	45	7	16	5	0	4	13	.356	0
Ryan Sweeney	77	207	22	52	9	0	3	20	.251	0
Matt Szczur	23	42	2	11	1	0	1	3	.262	0
Chris Valaika	33	93	8	22	2	0	3	10	.237	1
Luis Valbuena	136	436	60	108	30	4	16	48	.248	1
Logan Watkins	19	44	7	13	1	0	1	5	.295	1
Eli Whiteside	8	25	0	3	1	0	0	2	.120	1
Pitcher Totals	162	289	20	46	9	1	3	20	.159	0
Team totals	162	5508	614	1315	270	31	157	590	.239	65

=== Pitching ===
Note: W = Wins; L = Losses; ERA = Earned run average; G = Games pitched; GS = Games started; SV = Saves; IP = Innings pitched; R = Runs allowed; ER = Earned runs allowed; BB = Walks allowed; K = Strikeouts

Player	W	L	ERA	G	GS	SV	IP	R	ER	BB	K
Jake Arrieta	10	5	2.53	25	25	0	156.2	46	44	41	167
John Baker	1	0	0.00	1	0	0	1.0	0	0	1	0
Dallas Beeler	0	2	3.27	2	20	0	11.0	5	4	7	6
Felix Doubront	2	1	1.50	3	3	0	18.0	3	3	4	6
Kyuji Fujikawa	0	0	4.85	15	0	0	13.0	8	7	6	17
Justin Grimm	4	2	3.92	68	0	0	64.1	31	28	26	67
Jason Hammel	8	5	2.98	17	17	0	108.2	36	36	23	104
Kyle Hendricks	6	2	2.38	11	11	0	68.0	20	18	14	39
Edwin Jackson	6	15	6.33	28	27	0	140.2	105	99	63	123
Eric Jokisch	0	0	1.88	4	1	0	14.1	6	3	4	10
Blake Parker	1	1	6.35	14	0	0	17.0	12	12	4	19
Neil Ramirez	2	2	1.38	45	0	3	39.0	6	6	15	50
Héctor Rondón	3	4	2.72	57	0	24	56.1	21	17	13	60
Zac Rosscup	0	0	11.70	14	0	0	10.0	13	13	11	13
Chris Rusin	0	0	7.11	4	0	0	12.2	10	10	5	8
James Russell	0	2	3.51	44	0	1	33.1	14	13	16	26
Jeff Samardzija	2	7	2.83	17	17	0	108.0	44	34	31	103
Brian Schlitter	2	3	4.08	57	0	0	53.0	27	24	16	28
Dan Straily	0	1	10.45	4	1	0	10.1	14	12	6	9
Pedro Strop	2	4	2.29	59	0	2	55.0	18	14	24	63
Jacob Turner	1	2	5.31	5	3	0	20.1	13	12	4	11
José Veras	0	1	8.10	12	0	2	13.1	12	12	11	13
Carlos Villanueva	5	7	4.74	40	5	2	74.0	41	39	19	68
Arodys Vizcaino	0	0	5.40	5	0	0	5.0	3	3	3	4
Tsuyoshi Wada	4	3	3.34	11	11	0	59.1	25	22	17	48
Travis Wood	8	12	5.03	29	29	0	162.2	103	91	71	134
Wesley Wright	0	3	3.13	56	0	0	46.0	18	16	18	37
Team totals	73	89	3.91	162	162	37	1463.1	707	636	504	1311

=== Team ===
==== Scoring by inning ====
	1	2	3	4	5	6	7	8	9	≥10	Total
Chicago Cubs	64	64	71	76	66	84	63	63	49	14	614
Opponents	96	73	58	79	92	88	94	64	45	18	707

Source: Baseball-Reference

== Awards and honors ==
Major League Baseball All-Star Game

- Starlin Castro
- Jeff Samardzija
- Anthony Rizzo

Branch Rickey Award

- Anthony Rizzo

== Major League Baseball draft ==
During the draft, the Cubs drafted Kyle Schwarber with the fourth overall pick of the 2014 draft who would play an important role in the 2016 World Series.

== Farm system ==
Level	Team	League	Manager
AAA	Iowa Cubs	Pacific Coast League	Marty Pevey
AA	Tennessee Smokies	Southern League	Buddy Bailey
A	Daytona Cubs	Florida State League	Dave Keller
A	Kane County Cougars	Midwest League	Mark Johnson
A-Short Season	Boise Hawks	Northwest League	Gary Van Tol
Rookie	AZL Cubs	Arizona League	Jimmy Gonzalez

LEAGUE CHAMPIONS: Kane County

On September 16, 2014 the Cubs announced that they will be moving their top Class A affiliate from Daytona in the Florida State League to Myrtle Beach in the Carolina League for the 2015 season. Two days later, on the 18th, the Cubs signed a 4-year player development contract with the South Bend Silver Hawks of the Midwest League, ending their brief relationship with the Kane County Cougars. On the 25th, the Silver Hawks officially changed their name to the South Bend Cubs.
