= Junior Lake =

Dominican baseball player (born 1990)

- Lake with the Leones del Escogido in 2026

Toros de Tijuana – No. 27
- Outfielder
- Born: March 27, 1990 (age 36); San Pedro de Macorís, Dominican Republic
- Bats: Right Throws: Right

MLB debut
- July 19, 2013, for the Chicago Cubs

MLB statistics
- Batting average: .235
- Home runs: 17
- Runs batted in: 48
- Stats at Baseball Reference

Teams
- Chicago Cubs (2013–2015); Baltimore Orioles (2015); Toronto Blue Jays (2016)
Medals
Men's baseball
Representing Dominican Republic
World Baseball Classic
| Bronze medal – third place | 2026 Miami | Team |

Junior Osvaldo Lake (born March 27, 1990) is a Dominican professional baseball outfielder for the Toros de Tijuana of the Mexican League. He signed as an international free agent with the Chicago Cubs in 2007 and made his Major League Baseball (MLB) debut with them in 2013. He has also played in MLB for the Baltimore Orioles and Toronto Blue Jays.

== Professional career ==
=== Chicago Cubs ===
On February 13, 2007, he was signed as an international free agent. He started playing for the DSL Cubs at the age of 17 batting .274 with 3 home runs. He then played for the Arizona League Cubs batting .286 with 2 home runs. In 2009, he went to the Peoria Chiefs batting .248 with 7 home runs. Lake was added to the Cubs 40-man roster on November 18, 2011.

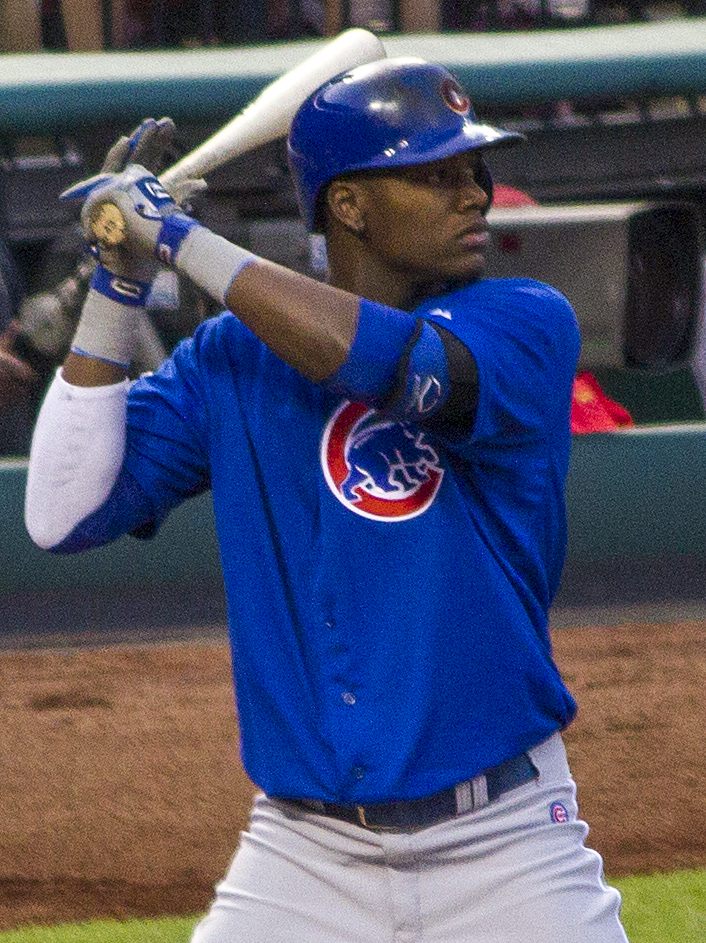
Lake batting for the Chicago Cubs in 2014

Lake suffered a stress fracture in a rib in spring training in 2013. He began the season in the minors. The Cubs promoted him to the major leagues on July 19 after Brian Bogusevic was injured and he was batting .295. Lake went 3-for-4 with a double and a stolen base in his debut. In his first seven games, Lake had 15 hits, tied for the third most by any major league player since 1900. He batted .484 with 2 home runs and 5 runs batted in over this stretch. With the return of David DeJesus on July 24 and the departure of Alfonso Soriano, Lake assumed the starting role of left field. On August 1, 2013, Lake had the first multi-homer game of his career when he hit two solo home runs in a 6-4 loss to the Los Angeles Dodgers at Wrigley Field. On September 6, 2013, he hit the first grand slam of his career in the first inning off Kyle Lohse of the Milwaukee Brewers. Lake finished the 2013 campaign batting .284 in 64 games with 6 homers, 16 RBIs, and 4 stolen bases.

Lake started at left field on Opening Day in 2014. He hit his 7th and 8th home runs of the season in a game against the Miami Marlins on June 7, it was his second career multi-homerun game. After hitting just .216 with 9 home runs for the Cubs in 2014, Lake was optioned back to the Triple-A Iowa Cubs on August 16.

Lake spent the majority of the 2015 season in Triple-A for the Cubs. He was called up and played in 21 games for the Cubs due to numerous injuries in the outfield.

=== Baltimore Orioles ===
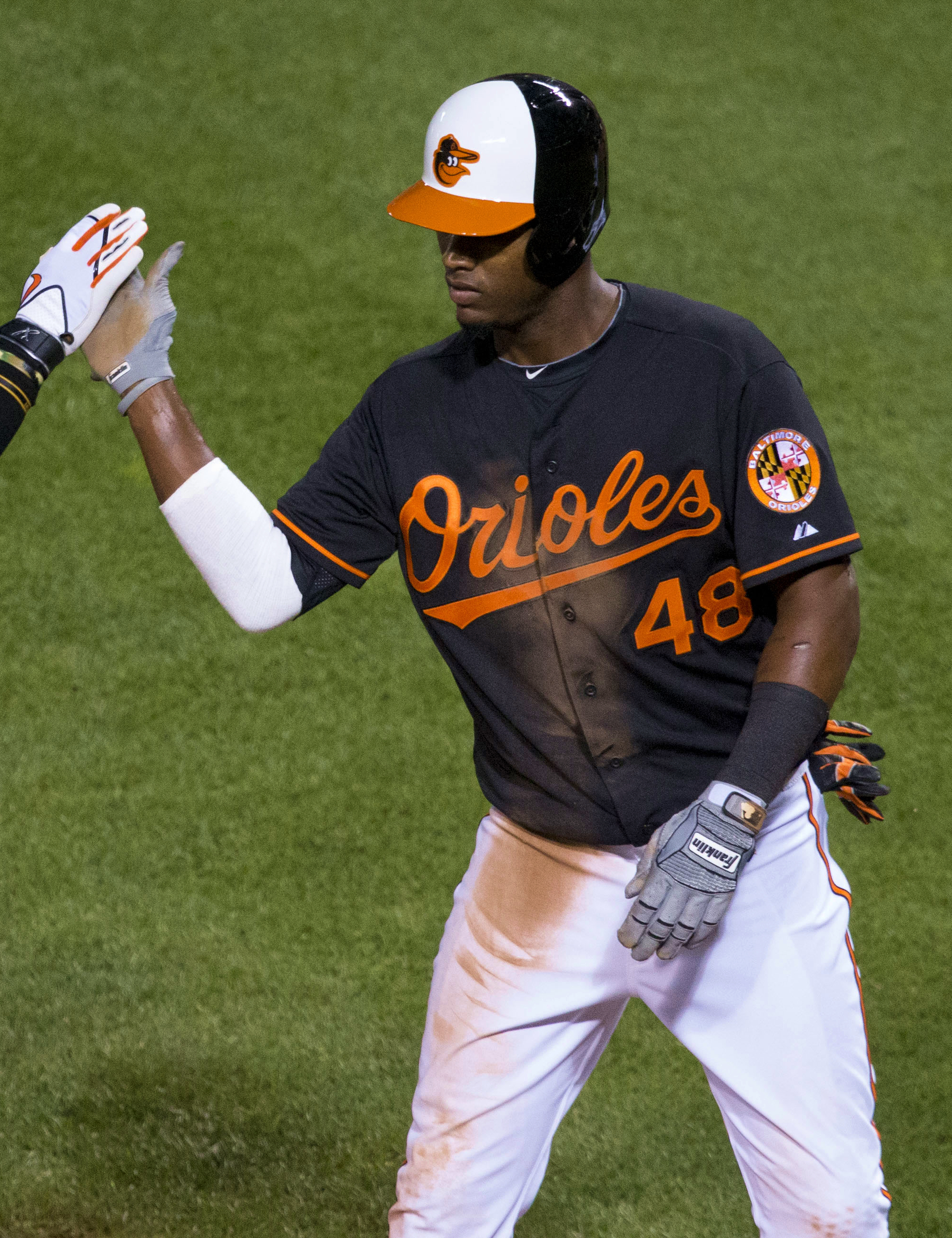
Lake with the Baltimore Orioles in 2015

On July 31, 2015, Lake was traded to the Baltimore Orioles in exchange for Tommy Hunter. Lake appeared in 8 games for the Orioles, batting .136. On December 10, Lake was designated for assignment by Baltimore.

=== Toronto Blue Jays ===
On December 18, 2015, Lake was claimed off waivers by the Toronto Blue Jays. Lake was added to their active roster on June 24, 2016. He was designated for assignment on July 25 after José Bautista returned from the disabled list. He cleared waivers, and was outrighted to the Triple-A Buffalo Bisons on July 31. Lake was brought up to the Blue Jays on August 10 when Bautista was once again placed on the disabled list. On August 16, Lake was designated for assignment after the Blue Jays activated Ezequiel Carrera. Lake played in 22 games for the Blue Jays in 2016, hitting .200 with one home run and two RBI. He elected free agency following the season on November 7.

=== Boston Red Sox ===
On December 9, 2016, Lake signed a minor league contract with the Boston Red Sox. In 19 games for the Triple–A Pawtucket Red Sox, he batted .246/.292/.312 with no home runs, one RBI, and two stolen bases. Lake was released by the Red Sox organization on May 1, 2017.

=== Bravos de León ===
On June 20, 2017, Lake signed with the Bravos de León of the Mexican League. In 41 games for León, he slashed .288/.411/.510 with six home runs, 34 RBI, and four stolen bases.

On February 14, 2018, Lake signed a minor league contract with the Seattle Mariners organization. He was released prior to the start of the season on March 28.

On April 7, 2018, Lake re-signed with the Bravos de León of the Mexican League. In 5 games for the team, he went 2–for–14 (.143) with no home runs, 1 RBI, and 4 stolen bases.

=== Toros de Tijuana ===
On July 10, 2018, Lake was traded to the Toros de Tijuana of the Mexican Baseball League. He played in 46 games for Tijuana in his first campaign, hitting .274/.383/.451 with 7 home runs, 37 RBI, and 6 stolen bases. In 2019, Lake made 114 appearances for Tijuana, slashing .306/.410/.528 with 21 home runs, 85 RBI, and 25 stolen bases. Lake did not play in a game in 2020 due to the cancellation of the Mexican League season because of the COVID-19 pandemic.

Lake played in 64 games for the Toros in 2021, batting .293/.390/.485 with 10 home runs, 29 RBI, and 4 stolen bases. The following season, he appeared in 88 contests for the team, slashing .318/.377/.559 with 22 home runs, 79 RBI, and 10 stolen bases. Lake returned in 2023, appearing in 5 games before being placed on the injured list on April 27.

=== El Águila de Veracruz ===
On May 12, 2023, Lake, along with P Samuel Zazueta and P Tyler Madrigal, were traded to El Águila de Veracruz of the Mexican League in exchange for P Luis Márquez. In 65 games for Veracruz, Lake hit .298/.414/.513 with 13 home runs, 43 RBI, and 8 stolen bases.

=== Toros de Tijuana (second stint) ===
On January 26, 2024, Lake signed with the Toros de Tijuana of the Mexican League. In 88 appearances for Tijuana, he batted .257/.353/.457 with 15 home runs, 40 RBI, and 15 stolen bases.

In 2025, Lake re-signed with Tijuana for a second consecutive season. In 89 games he hit .299/.392/.493 with 16 home runs, 60 RBIs and 18 stolen bases.

== International career ==
After the 2020 season, Lake played for the Dominican Republic in the 2021 Caribbean Series.
