= Mike Olt =

American baseball player (born 1988)

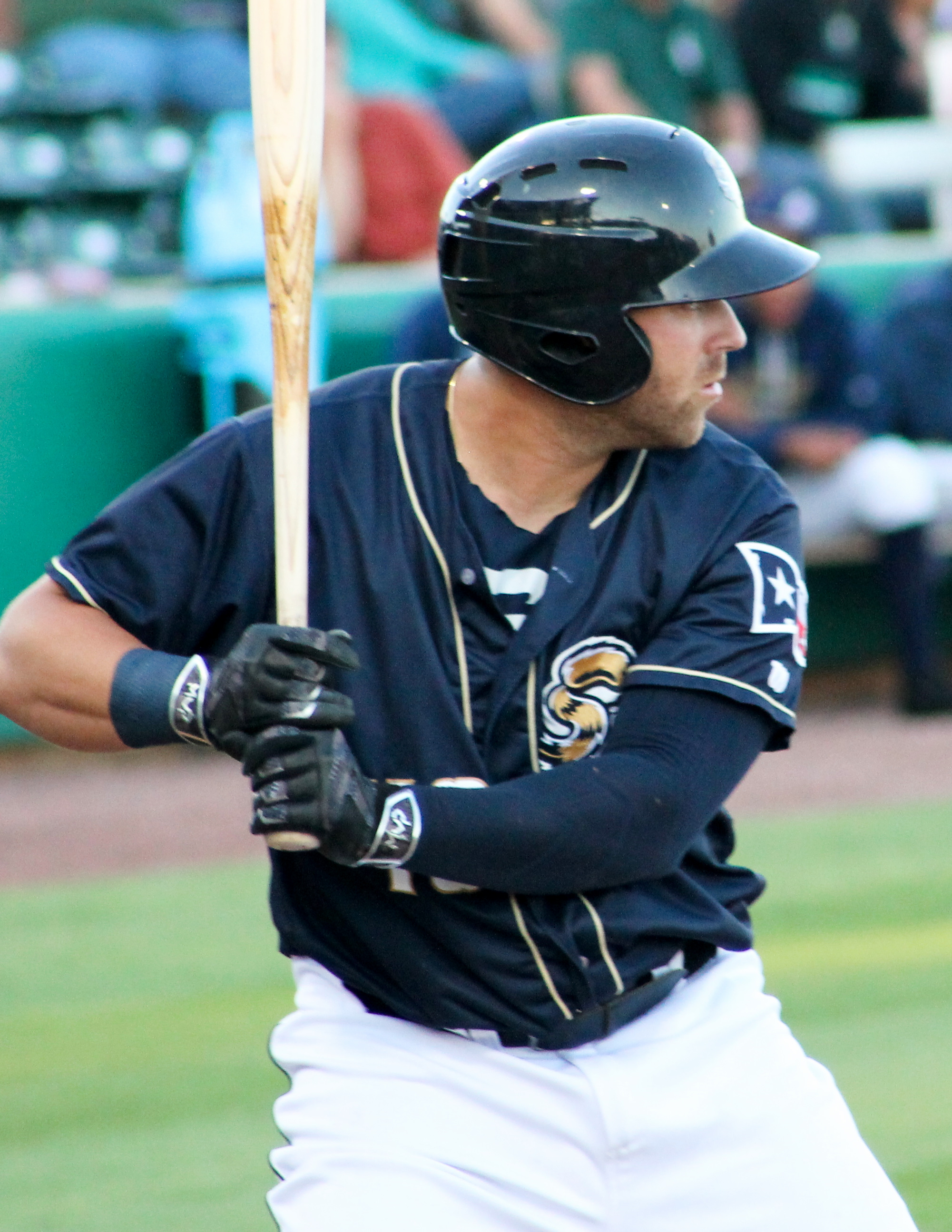
- Olt with the San Antonio Missions in 2016
- Third baseman
- Born: August 27, 1988 (age 37); New Haven, Connecticut, U.S.
- Batted: Right Threw: Right

MLB debut
- August 2, 2012, for the Texas Rangers

Last MLB appearance
- October 4, 2015, for the Chicago White Sox

MLB statistics
- Batting average: .168
- Home runs: 16
- Runs batted in: 43
- Stats at Baseball Reference

Teams
- Texas Rangers (2012); Chicago Cubs (2014–2015); Chicago White Sox (2015)

Michael George Olt (born August 27, 1988) is an American former professional baseball third baseman. He played in Major League Baseball (MLB) for the Texas Rangers, Chicago Cubs, and Chicago White Sox. He played college baseball at the University of Connecticut.

== Amateur career ==
Olt attended Branford High School in Branford, Connecticut, where he played for the school's baseball team. He started at shortstop for the school's varsity baseball team in all four years at Branford. In 2006, Branford won the Connecticut state championship. After graduating high school, Olt was not selected in the 2007 Major League Baseball draft.

Olt enrolled at the University of Connecticut in Storrs, Connecticut, where he played college baseball for the Connecticut Huskies. He was named a freshman All-American. Olt played for the New England Collegiate Baseball League's Danbury Westerners in 2008. In 2008 and 2009, he played collegiate summer baseball with the Orleans Firebirds of the Cape Cod Baseball League.

== Professional career ==
=== Texas Rangers ===
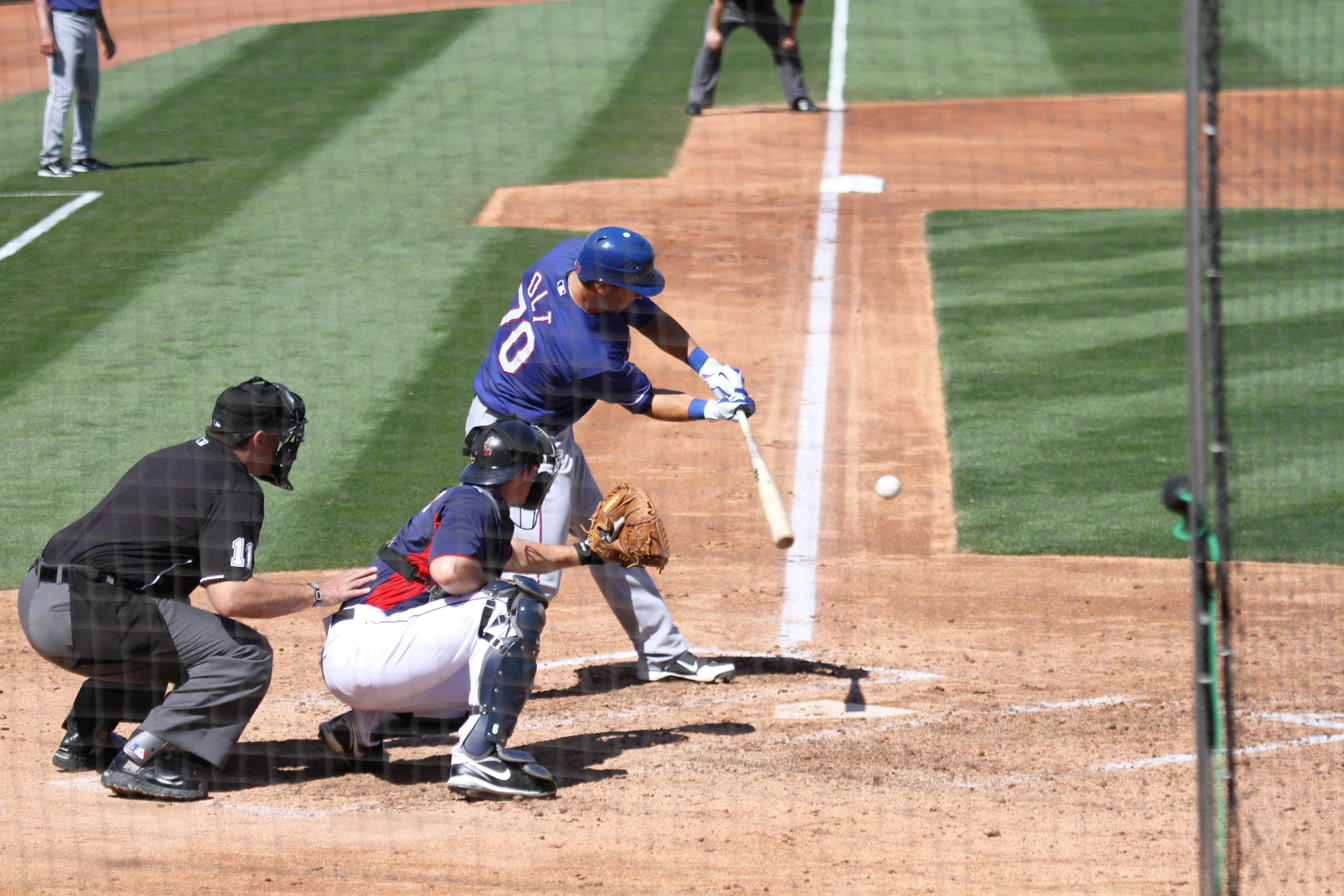
Olt batting during spring training in 2012

The Rangers drafted Olt in the supplemental first round, with the 49th overall selection, of the 2010 MLB draft. After he signed, Olt played for the Spokane Indians of the Low–A Northwest League. In 2011, Olt played for the High–A Myrtle Beach Pelicans, where he batted .267 with 14 home runs. He broke his collarbone in a collision in June, and missed ten weeks of the season. Olt participated in the Arizona Fall League (AFL) after the 2011 season. Olt led the AFL with 13 home runs.

Before the 2012 season, MLB.com ranked him as the 43rd best prospect in baseball. Olt began the season with the Frisco RoughRiders of the Double–A Texas League, and was named to appear in the 2012 All-Star Futures Game. After he batted .287 with 27 home runs and 81 runs batted in (RBI) for Frisco, the Rangers promoted Olt to the major leagues on August 2. In his debut, Olt recorded a hit in his first at-bat, and went 1-for-3. On August 11, he hit a pinch hit walk-off single to beat the Tigers, 2-1.

The Rangers optioned Olt to the Round Rock Express of the Triple–A Pacific Coast League (PCL) during spring training in 2013. He struggled to begin the season, batting .139 through April 25. He reported problems with depth perception, which specialists indicated could be the result of a concussion. When it was discovered that a lacrimal gland wasn't producing tears, he was given eye drops, which corrected the vision problem. He returned to Round Rock on June 3.

=== Chicago Cubs ===
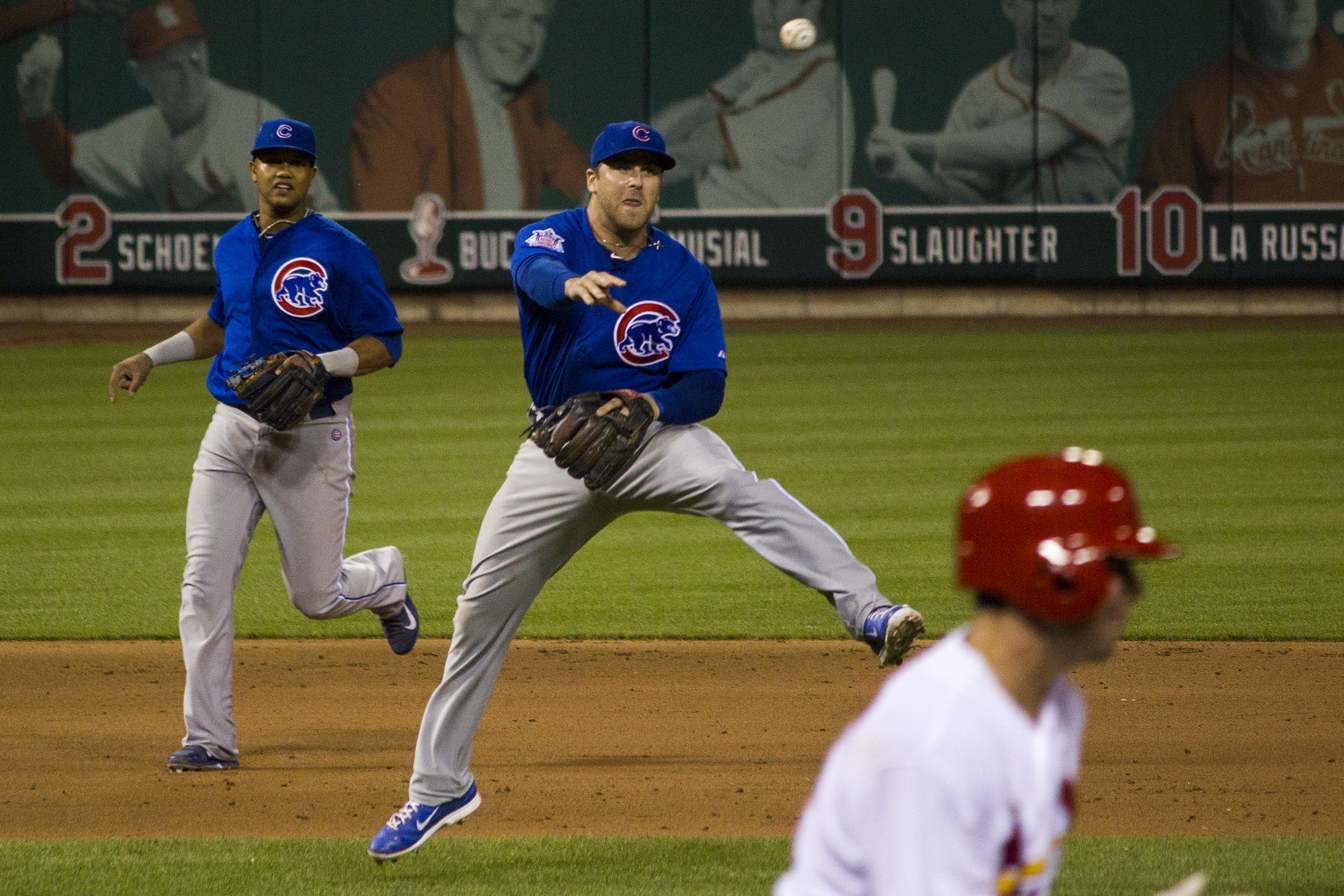
Olt fielding in St. Louis, 2014

After batting .213 at Round Rock, the Rangers traded Olt to the Chicago Cubs on July 22, 2013, with Justin Grimm, C. J. Edwards, and a player to be named later (Neil Ramirez), in exchange for Matt Garza. Olt reported to the Iowa Cubs of the PCL. He batted .168 in 152 plate appearances with Iowa. He attempted to find a new way to treat his vision problem, as the eye drops he was given raise the chances of developing glaucoma.

At the start of spring training in 2014, Olt reported that his vision problems had been resolved. Olt competed for the starting third base job with the Cubs. He made the Cubs' Opening Day roster, though Cubs' manager Rick Renteria suggested that Olt would split playing time at third base with Luis Valbuena. Olt hit his first major league home run on April 3, and his first grand slam on May 8. Olt was demoted back to Iowa on July 23, 2014 after posting a .139 batting average for the 2014 season. Twelve of his 31 hits were home runs by the time he was demoted, setting an all-time MLB season record for most home runs hit by a batter with an average below .170.

With Valbuena traded in the offseason, the Cubs opened the 2015 season with Olt as their starting third baseman, and top prospect Kris Bryant starting the year in Iowa. On April 17, Olt was placed on the 15-day disabled list with a hairline fracture in his right wrist, and Bryant was called up to replace him. He was moved to the 60-day disabled list four days later. Olt returned to play with Iowa and was designated for assignment on August 31.

=== Chicago White Sox ===
The Chicago White Sox claimed Olt off of waivers on September 5, 2015, and inserted him into their lineup at third base the next day. Olt batted .203 in 24 games for the White Sox. On September 16, Olt hit a home run, becoming the only player in MLB history to hit a home run for both Chicago MLB teams in the same season.

During the 2015-16 offseason, the White Sox acquired Todd Frazier as their third baseman. They designated Olt for assignment during spring training, after he had batted 1-for-10 in spring training games. The White Sox released Olt on March 15.

=== San Diego Padres ===
On March 17, 2016, Olt signed a minor league contract with the San Diego Padres organization. He played primarily for the Double–A San Antonio Missions, as well as three games for the Triple–A El Paso Chihuahuas. In 49 games for San Antonio, Olt batted .255/.373/.404 with five home runs and 25 RBI. He elected free agency following the season on November 7.

=== Boston Red Sox ===
Olt signed a minor league contract with the Boston Red Sox on February 7, 2017. He played in 113 games for the Double–A Portland Sea Dogs, hitting .245/.332/.436 with 16 home runs and 57 RBI. He elected free agency following the season on November 6.

Olt signed a new minor league contract with Boston on December 27, 2017. He played in 74 games between Portland and the Triple–A Pawtucket Red Sox, accumulating a .214/.346/.412 with 11 home runs and 28 RBI. Olt elected free agency following the season on November 3, 2018.

=== Long Island Ducks ===
Olt signed a minor league contract with the Minnesota Twins on January 28, 2019. He was released prior to the start of the season on March 27.

On April 23, 2019, Olt signed with the Long Island Ducks of the Atlantic League of Professional Baseball. In 24 appearances for Long Island, he slashed .082/.198/.096 with no home runs and five RBI. Olt was released by the Ducks on June 20.

=== Algodoneros de Unión Laguna ===
On July 6, 2019, Olt signed with the Algodoneros de Unión Laguna of the Mexican League. In eight appearances for Unión Laguna, he went 5-for-29 (.172) with no home runs or RBI. Olt was released by the Algodoneros on July 15.

Olt announced his retirement from professional baseball on October 25, 2019.

== Personal life ==
Olt's brother, Brad, was a teammate of Mike's with the Huskies. Brad also played baseball professionally for the Bad Homburg Hornets in the German Bundesliga.
