= Justin Grimm =

American baseball player (born 1988)

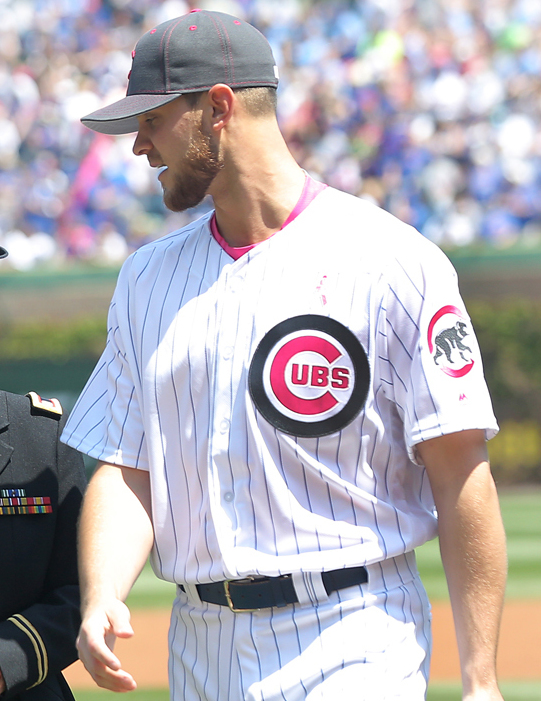
- Grimm at Wrigley Field in 2016
- Pitcher
- Born: August 16, 1988 (age 37); Bristol, Tennessee, U.S.
- Batted: Right Threw: Right

MLB debut
- June 16, 2012, for the Texas Rangers

Last MLB appearance
- May 27, 2022, for the Oakland Athletics

MLB statistics
- Win–loss record: 20–23
- Earned run average: 5.10
- Strikeouts: 378
- Stats at Baseball Reference

Teams
- Texas Rangers (2012–2013); Chicago Cubs (2013–2017); Kansas City Royals (2018); Seattle Mariners (2018); Milwaukee Brewers (2020); Oakland Athletics (2022)

Career highlights and awards
- World Series champion (2016)

Justin Scott Grimm (born August 16, 1988) is an American former professional baseball pitcher. He played in Major League Baseball (MLB) for the Texas Rangers, Chicago Cubs, Kansas City Royals, Seattle Mariners, Milwaukee Brewers, and Oakland Athletics.

== Amateur career ==
Grimm attended Virginia High School in Bristol, Virginia, where he played for the school's baseball team. He was projected as a third- or fourth-round pick out of high school in the 2007 Major League Baseball draft, but he fell to the 13th round where he was drafted by the Boston Red Sox. He fell in large part due to his commitment to the University of Georgia. He opted against pro baseball, enrolling at the University of Georgia where he played college baseball for the Georgia Bulldogs from 2008 to 2010.

In his freshman year he pitched 31 innings with a 10.91 ERA. His sophomore year was considerably better as he pitched 78 innings with a 4.15 ERA. In his third and final year at Georgia, he posted a 5.49 ERA in 77 innings. In 2008, he played collegiate summer baseball in the Cape Cod Baseball League for the Bourne Braves, and returned to the league in 2009 with the Cotuit Kettleers.

== Professional career ==
=== Texas Rangers ===
Grimm was drafted by the Texas Rangers in the fifth round of the 2010 Major League Baseball draft out of the University of Georgia.

Grimm made his MLB debut on June 16, 2012, against the Houston Astros. He won his debut, pitching six innings, striking out seven, walking none, and throwing 88 pitches for 56 strikes. Grimm was the first pitcher to have seven strikeouts and no walks in a debut since Stephen Strasburg's debut on June 8, 2010.

On May 2, 2013, Grimm was named American League Rookie of the Month for April. During April, Grimm held a 2–0 record with a 1.59 ERA in 3 starts, striking out 15 and holding opponents to a .239 batting average in 17.0 innings.

In the first half of the 2013 season, Grimm went into the All-Star Break with a 7–7 record and a 6.37 ERA. His final three Rangers appearances saw him go 0-2 and pitch 11.1 innings, giving up 23 hits, 6 walks, and 15 runs.

=== Chicago Cubs ===
The Rangers traded Grimm to the Chicago Cubs on July 22, 2013, with Mike Olt, C. J. Edwards, and Neil Ramirez, in exchange for Matt Garza. He was optioned to the Triple-A Iowa Cubs on July 23 and lost his first start for Iowa, giving up 7 earned runs in two innings including six straight hits to start the second inning. When major league rosters expanded in September, Grimm was recalled to the Cubs. Grimm finished the season in the Cubs' bullpen, working 9 innings and posting a 2.00 ERA.

Going into 2014 spring training, it was announced that Grimm would move to the Cubs' bullpen due to the considerable depth within the Cubs' starting rotation. At the end of spring training, Grimm made the Cubs' opening-day roster as a relief pitcher.

On August 29, 2014, Grimm became the 68th pitcher in Major League history to strike out four batters in a single inning.

Grimm finished the 2014 season with a 5–2 record, a 3.78 ERA and 70 strikeouts over 69 innings pitched, working primarily as a middle reliever. The following season he had a career low ERA of 1.99 in 62 games. In 2016, he worked 68 games with a 4.10 ERA in 52 2/3. He helped the Cubs to their first World Series championship since 1908 by pitching in three of the seven games. In his final season with the team in 2017, he had a 5.53 ERA in 50 games.

On March 15, 2018, the Cubs announced that Grimm was released from the organization.

=== Kansas City Royals ===
Grimm was signed to a one-year deal with the Kansas City Royals on March 18, 2018. He was placed on the disabled list on June 27 with a back injury, his second stint on the disabled list in the first half of the season. On July 7, The Royals requested release waivers on Grimm.

=== Seattle Mariners ===
On July 19, 2018, Grimm signed a minor league deal with the Seattle Mariners. He was promoted to the major leagues when rosters expanded on September 1, 2018.

=== Cleveland Indians ===
Grimm signed a minor league contract with the Cleveland Indians on January 3, 2019. The deal included an invitation to the Indians' 2019 major league spring training camp.

Grimm opted out of his contract on March 22, 2019, after being informed he would not make the opening day major league roster.

=== Los Angeles Dodgers ===
On March 24, 2019, Grimm signed a minor-league deal with the Los Angeles Dodgers.

=== Cincinnati Reds ===
On July 17, 2019, Grimm was traded to the Cincinnati Reds. In 17 appearances for the Triple–A Louisville Bats, he logged a 4.50 ERA with 28 strikeouts across 24 innings. Grimm elected free agency following the season on November 4.

=== Milwaukee Brewers ===
On December 4, 2019, Grimm signed a minor league contract with the Milwaukee Brewers. Grimm made the Opening Day roster for the Brewers in 2020. On August 28, 2020, he was designated for assignment. He was released on August 31.

=== Seattle Mariners (second stint) ===
On April 5, 2021, Grimm signed with the Mariachis de Guadalajara of the Mexican League. However, on May 7, before the Mexican League season began, Grimm signed a minor league contract with the Seattle Mariners organization. Grimm spent the 2021 season with the Triple-A Tacoma Rainiers. He made 45 appearances, going 3–1 with a 4.37 ERA and 72 strikeouts. Grimm became a free agent following the season.

=== Oakland Athletics ===
On December 28, 2021, Grimm signed a minor league contract with the Oakland Athletics. On April 7, 2022, Grimm's contract was selected by the A's and he was added to their opening day roster. He was designated for assignment on May 28 and was released on May 31.

Grimm retired from professional baseball following the 2022 season.

== Personal life ==
Grimm married longtime girlfriend Gina Nuccio, a former All-American gymnast at the University of Georgia, on January 30, 2016. Their son Austin was born in 2018.
