= Dallas Beeler =

American baseball player (born 1989)

- Pitcher
- Born: June 12, 1989 (age 37); Tulsa, Oklahoma, U.S.
- Batted: Right Threw: Right

MLB debut
- June 28, 2014, for the Chicago Cubs

Last MLB appearance
- July 28, 2015, for the Chicago Cubs

MLB statistics
- Win–loss record: 0–3
- Earned run average: 6.05
- Strikeouts: 13
- Stats at Baseball Reference

Teams
- Chicago Cubs (2014–2015)

Dallas James Beeler (born June 12, 1989) is an American former professional baseball pitcher. He played in Major League Baseball (MLB) for the Chicago Cubs in 2014 and 2015.

== Playing career ==
=== Amateur career ===
Beeler attended Jenks High School in Jenks, Oklahoma. The Toronto Blue Jays selected Beeler in the 37th round of the 2008 MLB draft, but he did not sign. Beeler then enrolled at Oral Roberts University, where he played college baseball for the Oral Roberts Golden Eagles. Beeler underwent Tommy John surgery while at Oral Roberts.

=== Chicago Cubs ===
The Chicago Cubs selected Beeler in the 41st round, with the 1,240th overall selection, of the 2010 Major League Baseball draft. He started the 2011 season with the Peoria Chiefs of the Single–A Midwest League, and was promoted to the Tennessee Smokies of the Double–A Southern League in June. After the 2013 season, the Cubs assigned Beeler to the Arizona Fall League. On November 20, 2013, the Cubs added Beeler to their 40-man roster to protect him from the Rule 5 draft.

Beeler made his MLB debut on June 28, 2014, vs the Washington Nationals. He singled off Gio González in his first at–bat. Beeler made 2 starts in his rookie campaign, posting an 0–2 record and 3.27 ERA with 6 strikeouts across 11 innings pitched. He 3 starts for the Cubs in 2015, struggling to a 9.72 ERA with 7 strikeouts over 8 1/3 innings of work. Beeler missed a majority of the 2016 season with right shoulder inflammation, appearing in only 8 games for the Triple–A Iowa Cubs. On November 7, 2016, Beeler was removed from the 40–man roster and sent outright to Iowa. He was released by the Cubs on organization March 25, 2017.

=== Sugar Land Skeeters ===
On April 20, 2017, Beeler signed with the Kansas City T-Bones of the American Association of Independent Professional Baseball. He did not play in a game for the club prior to his release on May 5. Beeler signed with the Sugar Land Skeeters of the Atlantic League of Professional Baseball for the 2018 season. In his time with the team, he recorded a 1.99 ERA with 6 wins and 54 strikeouts.

=== Kansas City Royals ===
On July 9, 2018, Beeler's contract was purchased by the Kansas City Royals organization. In 4 games (2 starts) for the Double–A Northwest Arkansas Naturals, he struggled to an 0–2 record and 13.50 ERA with 8 strikeouts across 11 1/3 innings of work. Beeler was released by Kansas City on July 23.

=== Sugar Land Skeeters (second stint) ===
On July 28, 2018, Beeler re-signed with the Sugar Land Skeeters of the Atlantic League of Professional Baseball. He re-signed with the team on March 14, 2019. In 26 starts for the team, Beeler registered a 9–7 record and 3.86 ERA with 97 strikeouts across 144 2/3 innings pitched.

On January 24, 2020, Beeler signed with the Lincoln Saltdogs of the American Association of Independent Professional Baseball. However, the Saltdogs were not selected to compete in the condensed 2020 season due to the COVID-19 pandemic. He wasn't chosen in the dispersal draft and became a free agent. On December 3, 2020, Beeler signed with the Saltdogs for the 2021 season, however, he was released on January 25, 2021.

== Coaching career ==
In January 2021, Beeler became the assistant baseball coach at Cascia Hall Preparatory School in Tulsa, Oklahoma.

== Personal ==
Beeler is the brother of NFL center Chase Beeler.
