= Arismendy Alcántara =

Dominican baseball player (born 1991)

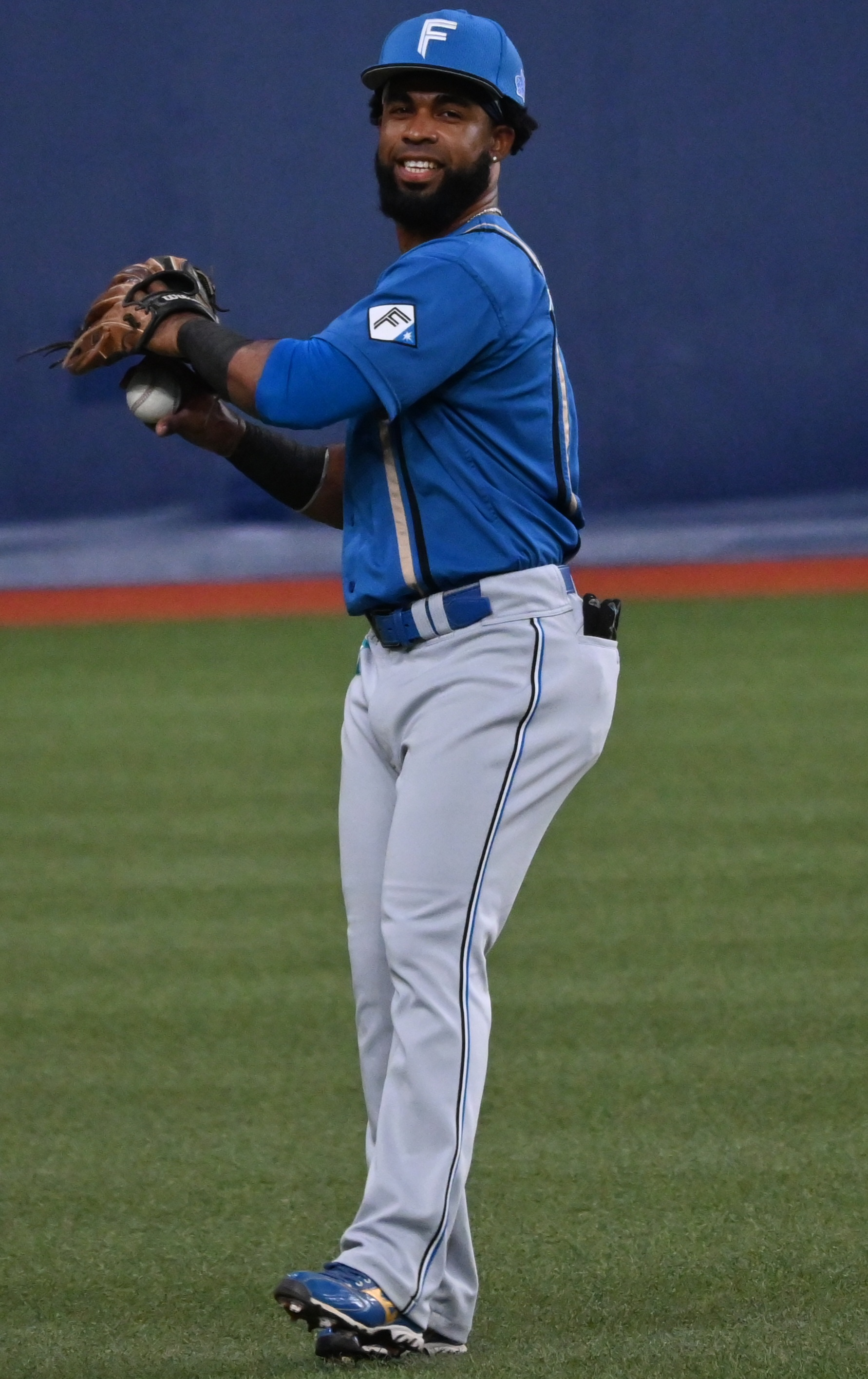
- Alcántara with the Hokkaido Nippon-Ham Fighters in 2022

Free agent
- Center fielder / Second baseman
- Born: October 29, 1991 (age 35); Santo Domingo, Dominican Republic
- Bats: Switch Throws: Right

Professional debut
- MLB: July 9, 2014, for the Chicago Cubs
- NPB: March 25, 2022, for the Hokkaido Nippon-Ham Fighters

MLB statistics (through 2017 season)
- Batting average: .189
- Home runs: 11
- Runs batted in: 39

NPB statistics (through 2023 season)
- Batting average: .207
- Home runs: 18
- Runs batted in: 38
- Stats at Baseball Reference

Teams
- Chicago Cubs (2014–2015); Oakland Athletics (2016); Cincinnati Reds (2017); Hokkaido Nippon-Ham Fighters (2022–2023)

Arismendy Alcántara (/ˌɑːrɛsˈmɛndi ɑːlˈkɑːntərə/; born October 29, 1991) is a Dominican professional baseball center fielder and second baseman who is a free agent. Alcántara signed as an international free agent with the Chicago Cubs in 2008 as a shortstop. He has previously played in Major League Baseball (MLB) for the Cubs, Oakland Athletics, and Cincinnati Reds, and in Nippon Professional Baseball with the Hokkaido Nippon-Ham Fighters.

== Career ==
=== Chicago Cubs ===
Alcántara signed as an international free agent with the Chicago Cubs in 2008 as a shortstop. He made his professional debut in the Dominican Summer League that summer. He played for the Peoria Chiefs of the Single–A Midwest League in 2011, and the Daytona Cubs of the High–A Florida State League in 2012, batting .302/.339/.447 in 331 at-bats. He was limited in the 2012 season by a broken foot.

In 2013, Alcántara played for the Tennessee Smokies of the Double–A Southern League. When the Cubs promoted fellow shortstop Javier Baez to Tennessee at midseason, they moved Alcántara to second base. Alcántara was selected to represent the Cubs at the 2013 All-Star Futures Game where he hit a home run. He also appeared in the Southern League All-Star Game. He batted .271/.352/.451 in 494 at bats, and was 2nd in the league in doubles (36), tied for 2nd in stolen bases (31), 3rd in intentional walks (6), 5th in RBI (69), tied for 5th in sacrifices (9), 8th in runs (69) and walks (62), and tied for 9th in home runs (15). On November 20, 2013, the Cubs added Alcántara to their 40-man roster to protect him from the Rule 5 draft.

Alcántara began the 2014 season with the Iowa Cubs of the Triple–A Pacific Coast League (PCL). With Iowa, he batted .307/.353/.537 in 335 at bats. The Cubs promoted him to the majors on July 9 to replace Darwin Barney, who was placed on the paternity list. Following a four-hit game on July 10, the Cubs informed him they would extend his time with the major league team through at least the All-Star break. Alcántara appeared in 70 games and finished 2014 with a .205 batting average, 10 home runs, and 29 RBIs.

Alcántara spent the majority of the 2015 campaign back with Iowa, slashing .231/.285/.399 in 499 Triple–A plate appearances. In 11 games with the big league club, he batted .077 (2-for-26).

=== Oakland Athletics ===
Alcántara began the 2016 season with Iowa, but was traded to the Oakland Athletics for Chris Coghlan on June 9, 2016. He was assigned to the Nashville Sounds of the PCL, and recalled by Oakland ten games later.

=== Cincinnati Reds ===
On October 6, 2016, Alcántara was claimed off waivers by the Cincinnati Reds.

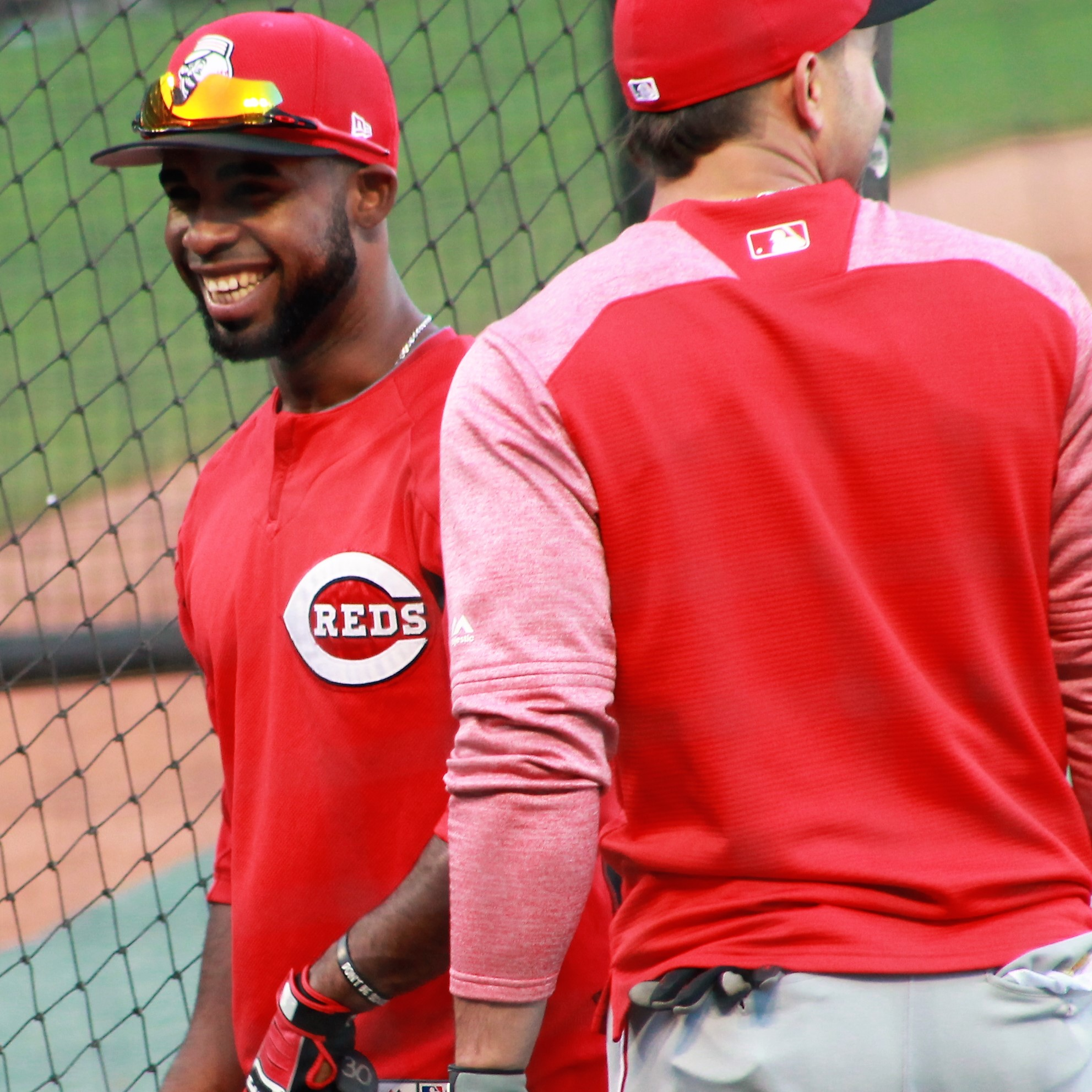
Alcántara (left) with the Reds in 2017

Alcántara played in 70 games for Cincinnati in 2017, but struggled to a .171/.187/.248 batting line with 1 home run and 7 RBI. On August 12, 2017, Alcántara was designated for assignment by the Reds after Scott Feldman was activated from the injured list. He cleared waivers and was sent outright to the Double–A Pensacola Blue Wahoos on August 14. In 17 games for Pensacola, Alcántara hit just .164/.250/.312 with no home runs and 8 RBI. He elected free agency following the season on November 6.

=== Diablos Rojos del México ===
On April 8, 2018, Alcántara signed with the Diablos Rojos del México of the Mexican League. In 21 games for México, Alcántara batted .264/.337/.407 with 3 home runs, 13 RBI, and 5 stolen bases.

=== Guerreros de Oaxaca ===
On May 4, 2018, Alcántara was traded to the Guerreros de Oaxaca of the Mexican Baseball League. In 56 games for Oaxaca, he hit 12 home runs and 46 RBI with 63 hits in 205 at–bats. He was released on August 14.

=== Toros de Tijuana ===
On August 14, 2018, Alcántara signed with the Toros de Tijuana of the Mexican Baseball League. He played in 18 games for the Toros, hitting .236/.307/.473 with 3 home runs, 12 RBI, and 4 stolen bases.

=== New York Mets ===
On January 3, 2019, Alcántara signed a minor league contract with the New York Mets organization. He played in 119 games split between the Double–A Binghamton Rumble Ponies and Triple–A Syracuse Mets, he slashed a combined .286/.354/.480 with 15 home runs, 58 RBI, and 21 stolen bases. Alcántara elected free agency following the season on November 4.

=== Los Angeles Angels ===
On December 10, 2019, Alcántara signed a minor league contract with the Los Angeles Angels that included an invitation to spring training. Alcántara did not play in a game in 2020 due to the cancellation of the minor league season because of the COVID-19 pandemic. He became a free agent on November 2, 2020.

=== San Francisco Giants ===
On January 12, 2021, Alcántara signed a minor league contract with the San Francisco Giants organization. He played in 71 games for the Triple–A Sacramento River Cats, hitting .280/.337/.586 with 17 home runs and 52 RBI. Alcántara elected free agency following the season on November 7.

=== Hokkaido Nippon-Ham Fighters ===
On December 10, 2021, Alcántara signed with the Hokkaido Nippon-Ham Fighters of Nippon Professional Baseball.

On April 24, 2022, Alcántara became the 20th player in NPB history to hit a home run from both sides of the plate in the same game. He re-signed with the team on a one-year contract for the 2023 season. In 41 games for the Fighters, he batted .204/.262/.363 with 4 home runs and 10 RBI. Alcántara became a free agent following the 2023 season.

=== Guerreros de Oaxaca (second stint) ===
On February 16, 2024, Alcántara signed with the Guerreros de Oaxaca of the Mexican League. In 23 games for the Guerreros, he batted .239/.309/.409 with four home runs, nine RBI, and five stolen bases. On May 18, Alcántara was released by Oaxaca.

=== Tigres de Quintana Roo ===
On May 23, 2024, Alcántara signed with the Tigres de Quintana Roo of the Mexican League. In three games for the team, he went 1–for–7 (.143) with one walk. On May 30, Alcántara was released by Quintana Roo.

=== El Águila de Veracruz ===
On July 7, 2025, Alcántara signed with El Águila de Veracruz of the Mexican League. He played in 15 games for the team, batting .243/.364/.514 with three home runs and 11 RBI. Alcántara was released by Veracruz on December 1.
