= Yohan Flande =

Dominican baseball player (born 1986)

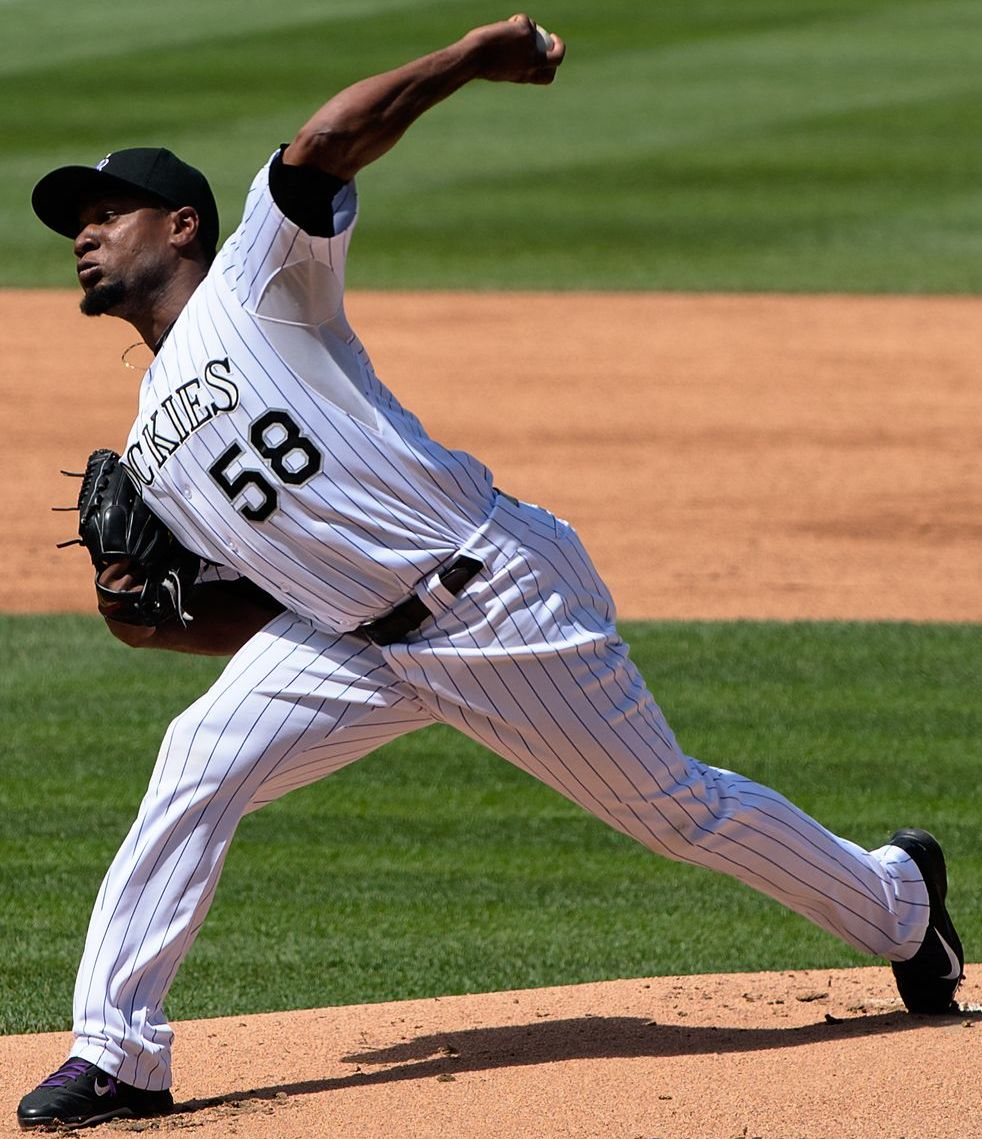
- Flande with the Colorado Rockies in 2015
- Pitcher
- Born: January 27, 1986 (age 40); El Seibo, Dominican Republic
- Batted: Left Threw: Left

Professional debut
- MLB: June 25, 2014, for the Colorado Rockies
- KBO: July 23, 2016, for the Samsung Lions

Last appearance
- MLB: June 28, 2016, for the Colorado Rockies
- KBO: October 8, 2016, for the Samsung Lions

MLB statistics
- Win–loss record: 3–9
- Earned run average: 5.15
- Strikeouts: 77

KBO statistics
- Win–loss record: 2–0
- Earned run average: 3.93
- Strikeouts: 16
- Stats at Baseball Reference

Teams
- Colorado Rockies (2014–2016); Samsung Lions (2016)

Yohan Carlos Concepción Flande (born January 27, 1986) is a Dominican former professional baseball pitcher. He played in Major League Baseball (MLB) for the Colorado Rockies, and in the KBO League for the Samsung Lions.

== Career ==
=== Philadelphia Phillies ===
Flande was signed by the Philadelphia Phillies as an international free agent in 2004. In 2009, he played in the All-Star Futures Game.

=== Atlanta Braves ===
After being released by the Phillies, he signed a minor league deal with the Atlanta Braves on December 21, 2010.

=== Colorado Rockies ===
Flande signed a minor league contract with the Colorado Rockies on February 4, 2014. Flande made his major league debut on June 25, 2014. He pitched five innings, striking out four, and giving up four runs on six hits.

Flande was designated for assignment on February 4, 2015. Flande earned his first MLB win on July 28, 2015, vs the Chicago Cubs in a 7–2 Rockies victory. He made 19 appearances (10 starts) for Colorado in 2015, recording a 4.74 ERA with 43 strikeouts across 68 1/3 innings pitched. On December 2, 2015, Flande was non–tendered by the Rockies, and became a free agent.

On December 28, 2015, the Rockies re-signed Flande to a minor league deal. In 2015 he gave up the longest home run of any major league pitcher, at 493 feet.

=== Samsung Lions ===
Flande signed with the Samsung Lions of the Korea Baseball Organization for the 2016 season.

=== Rieleros de Aguascalientes ===
On April 10, 2017, Flande signed with the Rieleros de Aguascalientes of the Mexican Baseball League. He re-signed for 2018 and became a free agent after the season.

=== Algodoneros de Unión Laguna ===
On May 27, 2019, Flande signed with the Algodoneros de Unión Laguna of the Mexican League. He was released on July 8, 2019.
