= Brian Schlitter =

American baseball player (born 1985)

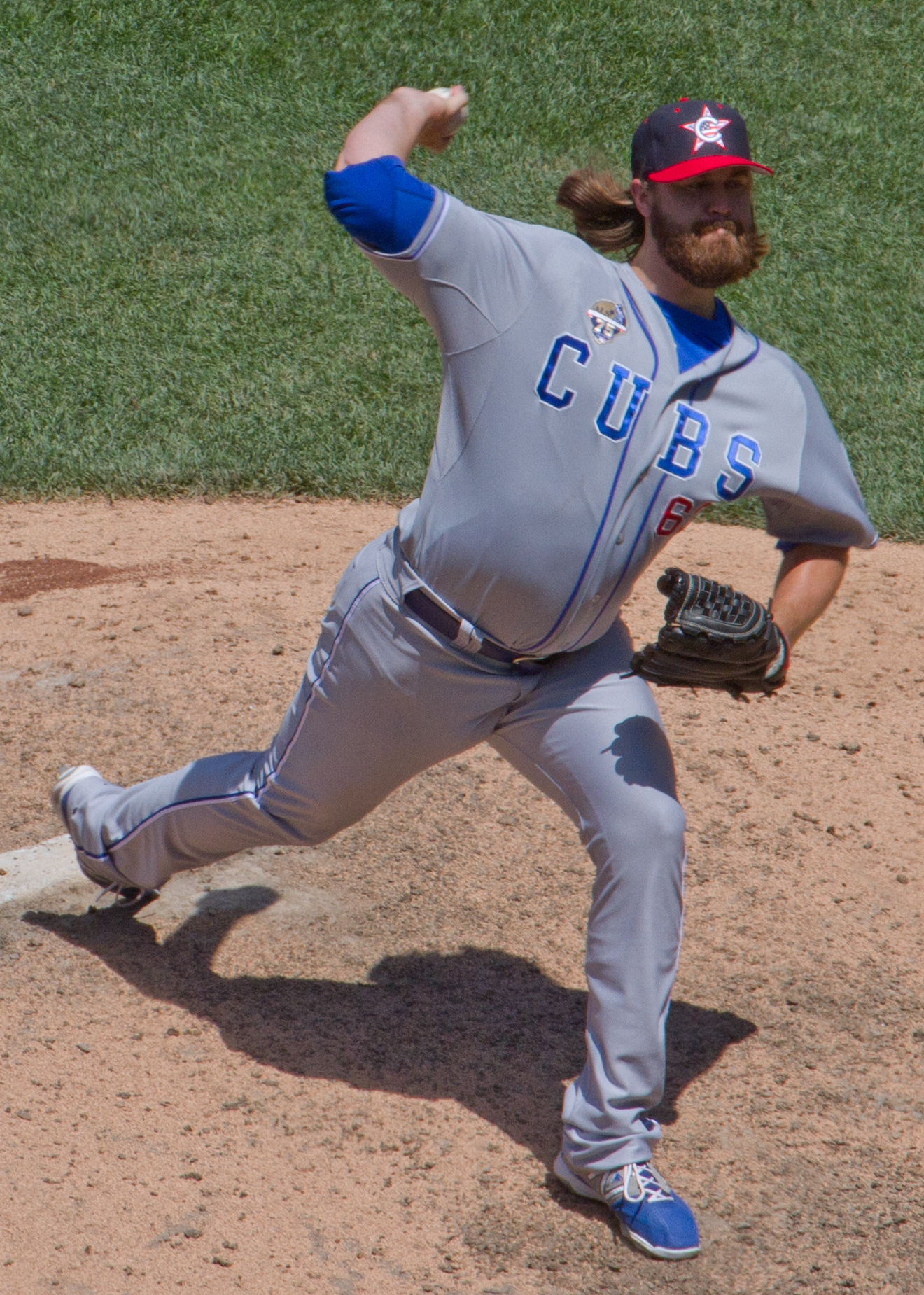
- Schlitter with the Chicago Cubs in 2014
- Relief pitcher
- Born: December 21, 1985 (age 40); Oak Park, Illinois, U.S.
- Batted: Right Threw: Right

Professional debut
- MLB: June 28, 2010, for the Chicago Cubs
- NPB: April 1, 2017, for the Saitama Seibu Lions

Last appearance
- MLB: July 25, 2019, for the Oakland Athletics
- NPB: October 5, 2017, for the Saitama Seibu Lions

MLB statistics
- Win–loss record: 3–6
- Earned run average: 5.20
- Strikeouts: 48

NPB statistics
- Win–loss record: 1–5
- Earned run average: 2.83
- Strikeouts: 23
- Stats at Baseball Reference

Teams
- Chicago Cubs (2010, 2014–2015); Saitama Seibu Lions (2017); Oakland Athletics (2019)

Brian Patrick Schlitter (born December 21, 1985) is an American former professional baseball pitcher. He played in Major League Baseball (MLB) for the Chicago Cubs and Oakland Athletics, and in Nippon Professional Baseball (NPB) for the Saitama Seibu Lions.

== Career ==
Prior to playing professionally, he attended Maine South High School and then the College of Charleston. He was originally drafted in the 34th round of the 2005 Major League Baseball draft by the Los Angeles Angels of Anaheim, however he did not sign.

=== Philadelphia Phillies ===
Schliter was next drafted in the 16th round of the 2007 amateur draft by the Philadelphia Phillies, and signed with them. He began his professional career in 2007, splitting the season between the Williamsport Crosscutters (one game) and Lakewood BlueClaws (16 games). That season he went a combined 0-1 with a 3.51 ERA in 17 relief appearances. In 2008, Schlitter pitched for the Clearwater Threshers in the Phillies organization, going 4-3 with a 2.22 ERA in 34 relief appearances with them.

=== Chicago Cubs ===
On August 7, 2008, Schlitter was traded to the Chicago Cubs in exchange for pitcher Scott Eyre. He finished the season with the Daytona Cubs, going 0-1 with a 2.16 ERA in seven relief appearances. Overall, he went 4-4 with a 2.21 ERA in 41 relief appearances, striking out 67 batters in 57 innings. Schlitter spent all of 2009 with the Tennessee Smokies, going 1-7 with a 4.38 ERA in 59 relief appearances. He began 2010 with the Triple-A Iowa Cubs, with whom he went 1-1 with a 4.09 ERA in 27 relief appearances prior to his call up to the major leagues.

On June 28, 2010, Schlitter made his major league debut. He pitched 2/3 of an inning against the Pittsburgh Pirates, striking out both batters he faced. The Cubs placed Schlitter on the 15-day disabled list with a right shoulder impingement on July 7. Schlitter was optioned back to Triple-A on August 3, a day after hitting Milwaukee Brewers center fielder Carlos Gómez on the head with a pitch. He finished his rookie year with a 12.38 ERA in seven appearances.

On January 5, 2011, Schlitter was claimed off waivers by the New York Yankees. On February 14, Schlitter was designated for assignment by the Yankees. Schlitter claimed off waivers by the Philadelphia Phillies on February 15. On April 18, Schlitter was returned to the Cubs. The commissioner's office returned him to the Cubs from the Phillies because of a past elbow injury.

Schlitter split the 2012 season Double-A Tennessee Smokies and Daytona, posting a 2.61 ERA in 50 appearances. The next year, Schlitter logged a 2.42 ERA in 54 appearances between Iowa and Tennessee. In 2014, Schlitter was invited to Spring Training as a non-roster invitee. On March 29, 2014, the Cubs announced that he had made the team's Opening Day roster. Schlitter earned his first career win on May 3, against the St. Louis Cardinals. He finished the year with a 2-3 record and 4.15 ERA across 61 appearances.

Schlitter did not make the Opening Day roster in 2015 and was assigned to Iowa to begin the year. Schlitter struggled to a 7.36 ERA in 10 major league appearances and was designated for assignment on August 27, 2015. He was assigned outright to Iowa, where he finished the season, and elected free agency on October 14.

=== Colorado Rockies ===
On November 18, 2015, Schlitter signed a minor league contract with the Colorado Rockies organization that included an invitation to Spring Training. He did not make the club out of spring and was assigned to the Triple-A Albuquerque Isotopes to begin the year. He spent the season in Albuquerque, pitching to a 3.64 ERA with 43 strikeouts in 42 innings of work. On October 26, 2016, Schlitter was released by the Rockies.

=== Saitama Seibu Lions ===
On November 10, 2016, Schlitter signed with the Saitama Seibu Lions of Nippon Professional Baseball. Schlitter fared well in Japan, logging a 2.83 ERA with 23 strikeouts in 64 appearances. He became a free agent after the 2017 season.

=== Los Angeles Dodgers ===
On February 13, 2018, Schlitter signed a minor league contract with the Los Angeles Dodgers. He pitched in 58 games for the Triple–A Oklahoma City Dodgers, with a 7–2 record, 3.36 ERA and 21 saves. Schlitter elected free agency following the season on November 2.

=== Oakland Athletics ===
On November 15, 2018, Schlitter signed a minor league deal with the Oakland Athletics. He was assigned to the Triple-A Las Vegas Aviators to begin the 2019 season. On June 23, 2019, his contract was selected by the A's. On July 29, he was designated for assignment after logging a 3.72 ERA in 6 games. He finished the year in Triple-A and elected free agency on October 1. He re-signed with the A's on November 25, 2019. However, Schlitter did not play in a game in 2020 due to the cancellation of the minor league season because of the COVID-19 pandemic. On November 2, 2020, Schlitter again re-signed with Oakland on a new minor league contract. Schlitter recorded a 9.00 ERA in 5 games for Triple-A Las Vegas before being released on May 23, 2021.

=== Seattle Mariners ===
On May 26, 2021, Schlitter signed a minor league contract with the Seattle Mariners. In 36 appearances for the Triple–A Tacoma Rainiers, he registered a 3.98 ERA with 29 strikeouts and 2 saves across 40 2/3 innings pitched. Schlitter elected free agency following the season on November 7.

=== Guerreros de Oaxaca ===
On May 4, 2022, Schlitter signed with the Guerreros de Oaxaca of the Mexican League. In 13 appearances, he posted a 3–2 record with a 8.49 ERA and 6 strikeouts over 11 2/3 innings. Schlitter was released by Oaxaca on June 6.

=== Chicago Dogs ===
On June 15, 2022, Schlitter signed with the Chicago Dogs of the American Association of Professional Baseball. In 32 relief appearances, he posted a 3.29 ERA with 26 strikeouts and 7 saves across 38 1/3 innings of work.

In 2023, Schlitter pitched in 46 games for Chicago, recording a 3.24 ERA with 24 strikeouts and 18 saves across 50 innings pitched.

=== Dorados de Chihuahua ===
On February 7, 2024, Schlitter signed with the Dorados de Chihuahua of the Mexican League. In 23 relief appearances, Schlitter posted a 1–3 record with a 8.25 ERA and 11 strikeouts over 24 innings. He was released by Chihuahua on July 5.

=== Chicago Dogs (second stint) ===
On July 10, 2024, Schlitter signed with the Chicago Dogs of the American Association of Professional Baseball. In 21 games for the Dogs, he logged a 2–2 record and 7.15 ERA with 15 strikeouts and 3 saves across 22 2/3 innings of relief.
