= Chris Coghlan =

American baseball player (born 1985)

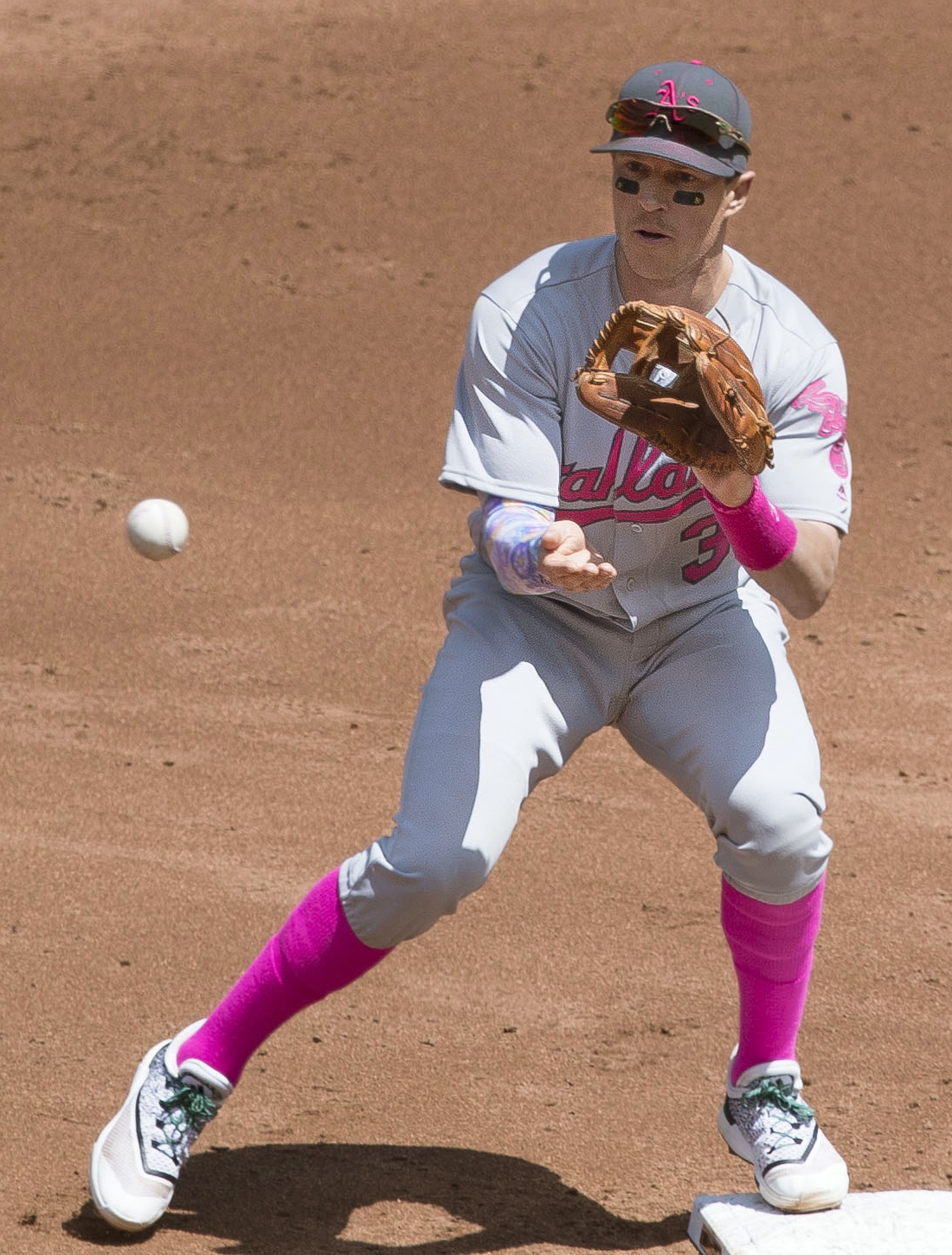
- Coghlan playing for the Oakland Athletics in 2016
- Outfielder
- Born: June 18, 1985 (age 41); Rockville, Maryland, U.S.
- Batted: Left Threw: Right

MLB debut
- May 8, 2009, for the Florida Marlins

Last MLB appearance
- June 7, 2017, for the Toronto Blue Jays

MLB statistics
- Batting average: .258
- Home runs: 53
- Runs batted in: 234
- Stats at Baseball Reference

Teams
- Florida / Miami Marlins (2009–2013); Chicago Cubs (2014–2015); Oakland Athletics (2016); Chicago Cubs (2016); Toronto Blue Jays (2017)

Career highlights and awards
- World Series champion (2016); NL Rookie of the Year (2009)

Christopher Brockett Coghlan (/ˈkɑːɡlən/ KAHG-lihn; born June 18, 1985) is an American former professional baseball outfielder. He played in Major League Baseball (MLB) for the Chicago Cubs, Florida / Miami Marlins, Oakland Athletics, and Toronto Blue Jays. Coghlan was the National League Rookie of the Year in 2009.

== Career ==
=== High school and college ===
Coghlan attended East Lake High School in Tarpon Springs, Florida. He was selected by the Arizona Diamondbacks in the 18th round (546th overall) of the 2003 Major League Baseball draft, but did not sign, choosing instead to attend the University of Mississippi (Ole Miss) to play college baseball for the Ole Miss Rebels. In 2004, Coghlan started 54 games at third base and made the Southeastern Conference (SEC) All-Freshman team. He was named to the All-SEC second team in 2005. He played collegiate summer baseball for the Chatham A's of the Cape Cod Baseball League in 2005, was named a league all-star, and led the league in batting with a .346 average. In 2006, he was a first-team All-SEC and third-team All-American selection.

Coghlan was selected by the Florida Marlins in the first round (36th overall) of the 2006 Major League Baseball draft, and signed.

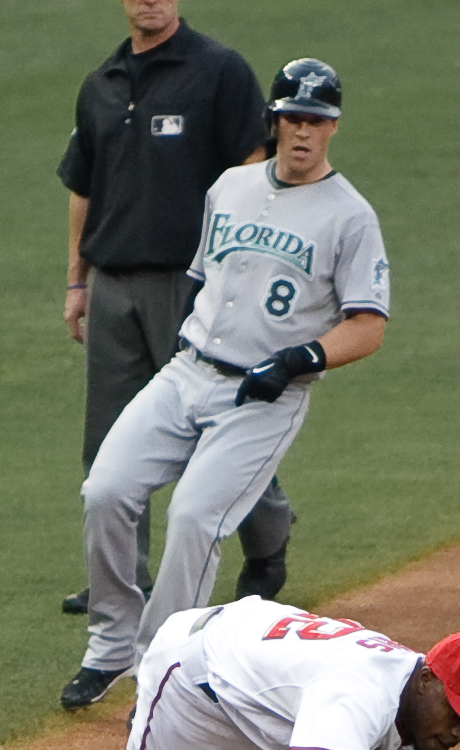
Coghlan playing for the Florida Marlins in 2009

=== Florida/Miami Marlins ===
After joining the Marlins organization, Coghlan played for the Gulf Coast Marlins (Rookie level), the Jamestown Jammers (Low-A), the Greensboro Grasshoppers (A), the Jupiter Hammerheads (High-A), the Carolina Mudcats (Double-A) and the New Orleans Zephyrs (Triple-A). Much of his time in the minors was spent switching positions from his college position of third base to second base and eventually left field when called up to the Florida Marlins.

Coghlan made his major league debut on May 8, 2009. On August 9, 2009, he set the Marlins team record for consecutive multi-hit games at eight.

Coghlan had 41 hits in August 2009, the most for a rookie since Todd Helton hit 45 in August 1998, earning him Rookie of the Month honors. He then followed with 50 hits in September/October 2009, the first rookie with back to back 40+ hit months, and the first player to do so since Ichiro Suzuki in 2004. His .321 batting average was 6th in NL among all players and 1st among all rookies. After the MLB All-Star break, Coghlan led all major league players in batting average (.372) and hits (113). His overall performance earned him the National League Rookie of the Year Award on November 16, 2009.

In April 2012, Coghlan was sent down to New Orleans, with Bryan Petersen being recalled to take his place. Coghlan was hitting .121 with a .299 OPS and 2 RBI in Miami. In May 2012, Coghlan and Donovan Solano were called up by the Marlins after Emillio Bonifacio was placed on the disabled list with a thumb injury. He started the same day against the Cleveland Indians going 0–4 with an RBI. In June 2012, Coghlan was sent down for a second time to the New Orleans Zephyrs to make room for Scott Cousins.

After the 2013 season, Coghlan was non-tendered by Miami, becoming a free agent.

=== Chicago Cubs ===
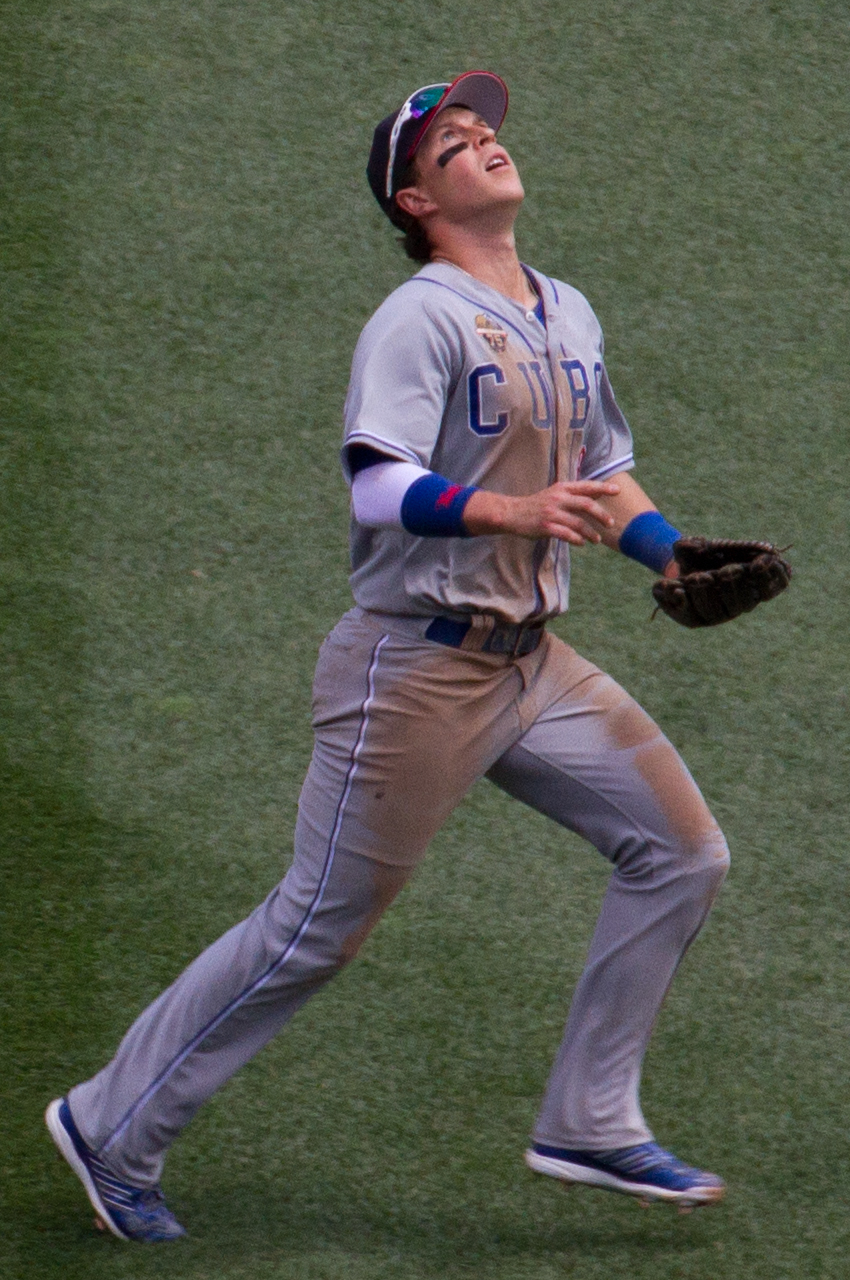
Coghlan playing for the Chicago Cubs in 2015

In January 2014, Coghlan signed a minor league deal including a spring training invitation with the Chicago Cubs. On May 3, the Cubs selected his contract from the Triple-A Iowa Cubs. He played in 125 games with the Cubs, switching between left and center field, with 385 at bats, hitting .283 with 9 home runs and 41 RBI's. He was most often used as a leadoff hitter and had an on-base percentage (OBP) of .352.

=== Oakland Athletics ===
On February 25, 2016, the Cubs traded Coghlan to the Oakland Athletics for right-handed pitcher Aaron Brooks. While with the A's Coghlan batted .146.

=== Second stint with the Chicago Cubs ===
On June 9, 2016, the Athletics traded Coghlan to the Cubs for Arismendy Alcántara. Coghlan played 48 games with the Chicago Cubs to finish 2016, batting .252 with a home run and 16 RBI. Overall in 2016, combined with both teams, Coghlan played 99 total games with a .188 average, six home runs, and 30 RBI. The Cubs finished the season with a 103–58 record, winning the NL Central division. Coghlan played in the 2016 World Series, which the Cubs would eventually win over the Cleveland Indians, ending their 108-year long drought.

=== Philadelphia Phillies ===
On February 2, 2017, Coghlan signed a minor league contract with the Philadelphia Phillies. He was released on March 28.

=== Toronto Blue Jays ===
On April 1, 2017, Coghlan signed a minor league contract with the Toronto Blue Jays, and was assigned to the Triple-A Buffalo Bisons. He was called up by the Blue Jays on April 14. On April 25, 2017, in a game against the St. Louis Cardinals, Coghlan scored a "play of the year" candidate by performing a dive roll over Cardinals' catcher Yadier Molina to avoid a tag and score a go-ahead run at the top of the seventh inning. Toronto won 6–5 in 11 innings. Coghlan was designated for assignment on August 12, and released on August 15.

=== Chicago Cubs (third stint) ===
On March 29, 2018, Coghlan signed a minor league contract with the Chicago Cubs. In 61 games split between the rookie–level Arizona League Cubs and Triple–A Iowa Cubs, he accumulated a .250/.353/.404 batting line with four home runs and 19 RBI. Coghlan elected free agency following the season on November 2.

== Personal life ==
Coghlan married former The Bachelor season 14 contestant Corrie Adamson in 2011. His father Tim was killed in a traffic accident on June 5, 2001.
