= Raffy Lopez =

American baseball player (born 1987)

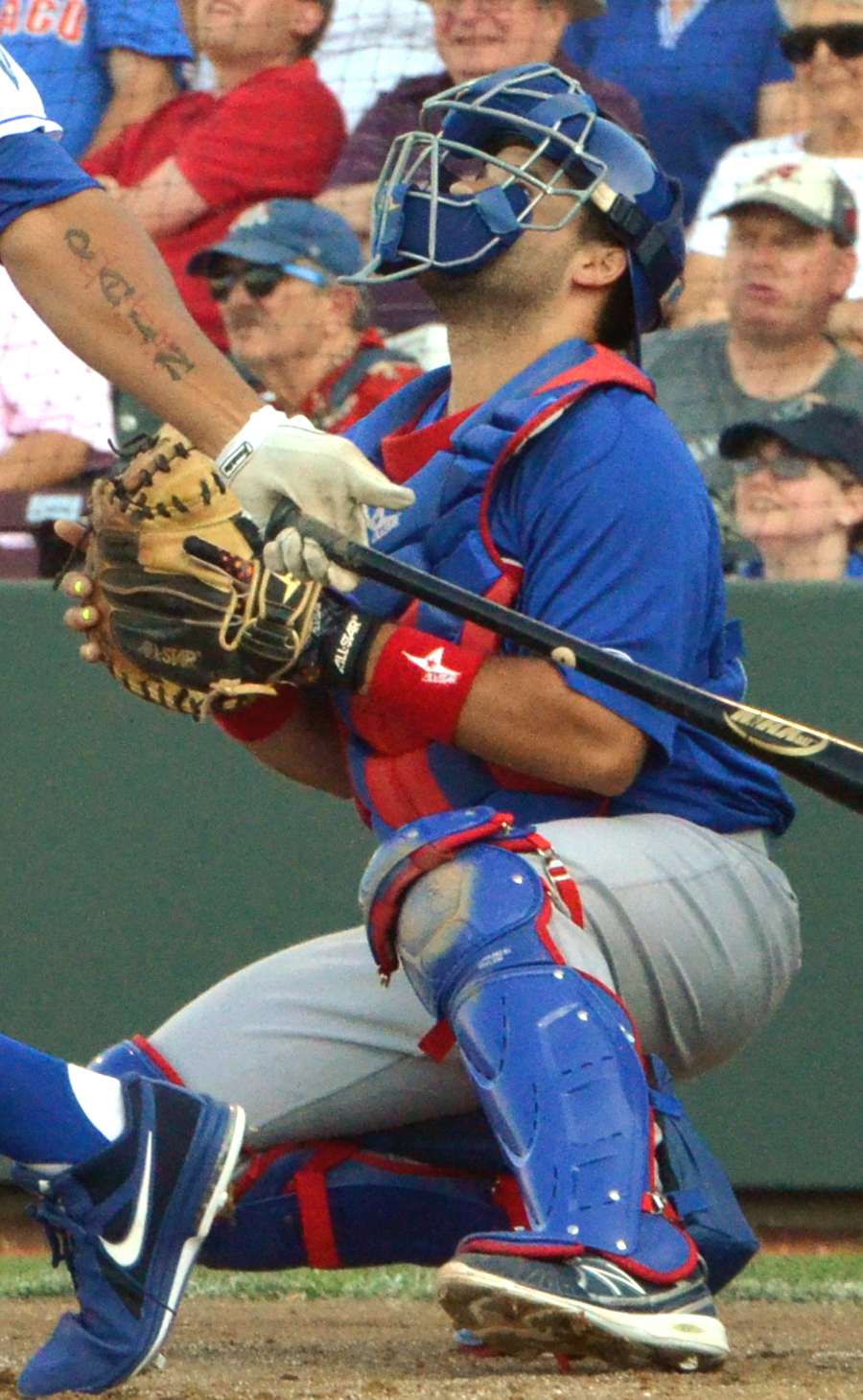
- Lopez with the Iowa Cubs in 2014
- Catcher
- Born: October 2, 1987 (age 37); Philadelphia, Pennsylvania, U.S.
- Batted: Left Threw: Right

MLB debut
- September 2, 2014, for the Chicago Cubs

Last MLB appearance
- July 20, 2018, for the San Diego Padres

MLB statistics
- Batting average: .184
- Home runs: 7
- Runs batted in: 26
- Stats at Baseball Reference

Teams
- Chicago Cubs (2014); Cincinnati Reds (2016); Toronto Blue Jays (2017); San Diego Padres (2018)

Rafael Manuel Lopez (born October 2, 1987) is an American former professional baseball catcher. He played in Major League Baseball (MLB) for the Chicago Cubs, Cincinnati Reds, Toronto Blue Jays, and San Diego Padres.

== Career ==
=== Chicago Cubs ===
Lopez attended Summit Christian High School in Wellington, Florida, and Florida State University, where he played college baseball for the Florida State Seminoles. The Chicago Cubs selected Lopez in the 16th round of the 2011 Major League Baseball draft. Lopez was called up to the majors for the first time on September 2, 2014. He was optioned to the Triple-A Iowa Cubs on March 16, 2015, and designated for assignment on June 27.

=== Los Angeles Angels ===
The Cubs traded Lopez to the Los Angeles Angels of Anaheim in exchange for pitching prospect Manuel Rondon on July 3, 2015. He was released by the Angels on December 23, 2015.

=== Detroit Tigers ===
Lopez signed with the Detroit Tigers organization on January 4, 2016. He was assigned to the Toledo Mud Hens on January 12, and released on April 2.

=== Cincinnati Reds ===
On May 3, 2016, Lopez signed a minor league contract with the Cincinnati Reds. He was brought up to the major league squad on August 27. In 8 games for the Reds, Lopez went 0–for–7. On October 10, he was removed from the 40–man roster and sent outright to the Triple–A Louisville Bats. Lopez elected free agency following the season on November 7.

=== Toronto Blue Jays ===
On February 16, 2017, Lopez signed a minor league deal with the Toronto Blue Jays. On August 4, Lopez was called up to the majors to replace the injured Miguel Montero. Lopez hit his first Major League home run in a 7–6 win over the Tampa Bay Rays on August 23. He was outrighted to Triple-A on November 6, and elected free agency later that day.

=== San Diego Padres ===
On December 7, 2017, Lopez signed a minor league contract with the San Diego Padres. His contract was purchased by the Padres on March 28, 2018, and he was assigned to the Opening Day roster. Lopez was recalled from the El Paso Chihuahuas on May 1.

=== Atlanta Braves ===
On November 1, 2018, Lopez was traded to the Atlanta Braves in exchange for a player to be named later or cash considerations. On March 22, 2019, after appearing in spring training with the Braves, Lopez was assigned to Triple-A affiliate Gwinnett Stripers to begin the season. Six days later, the Braves designated Lopez for assignment. Lopez cleared waivers and was sent outright to Triple-A on April 4. He elected free agency following the season.
