= Neil Ramírez =

American baseball player (born 1989)

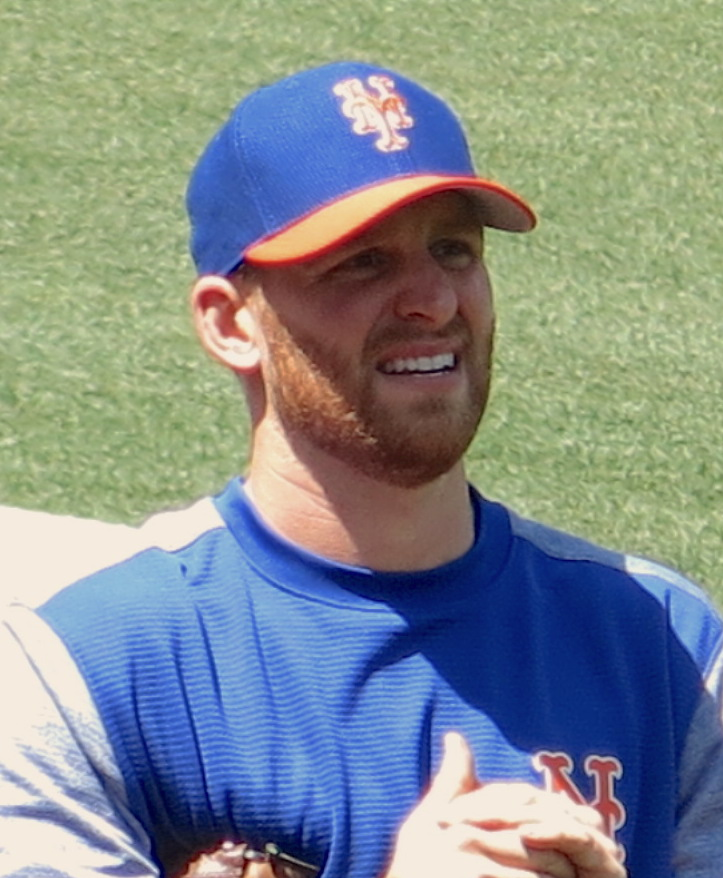
- Ramírez with the New York Mets in 2017
- Pitcher
- Born: May 25, 1989 (age 37); Virginia Beach, Virginia, U.S.
- Batted: Right Threw: Right

MLB debut
- April 25, 2014, for the Chicago Cubs

Last MLB appearance
- August 30, 2019, for the Toronto Blue Jays

MLB statistics
- Win–loss record: 4–8
- Earned run average: 4.46
- Strikeouts: 211
- Stats at Baseball Reference

Teams
- Chicago Cubs (2014–2016); Milwaukee Brewers (2016); Minnesota Twins (2016); San Francisco Giants (2017); New York Mets (2017); Cleveland Indians (2018–2019); Toronto Blue Jays (2019)
Medals
Men's baseball
Representing United States
World Junior Baseball Championship
Silver medal – second place	2006 Sancti Spíritus	Team

Neil Andrew Ramírez (born May 25, 1989) is an American former professional baseball pitcher. He played in Major League Baseball (MLB) for the Chicago Cubs, Milwaukee Brewers, Minnesota Twins, San Francisco Giants, New York Mets, Cleveland Indians, and Toronto Blue Jays.

== Early life and amateur career ==
Ramírez attended and played baseball at Kempsville High School in Virginia Beach, Virginia. In high school, he was named the 2007 Gatorade Virginia Baseball Player of the Year, made the East team roster at the 2006 Aflac All-American Classic and won a silver medal with the United States at the 2006 World Junior Baseball Championship in Cuba. Baseball America ranked him the 71st best draft prospect in 2007.

Ramírez originally committed to play college baseball at Georgia Tech but was selected by the Texas Rangers in the first round of the 2007 Major League Baseball draft and decided instead to sign a professional contract.

== Professional career ==
=== Texas Rangers ===
Ramírez spent six years in the Rangers' farm system, playing for the Spokane Indians in 2008 and the Hickory Crawdads in 2009 and 2010.

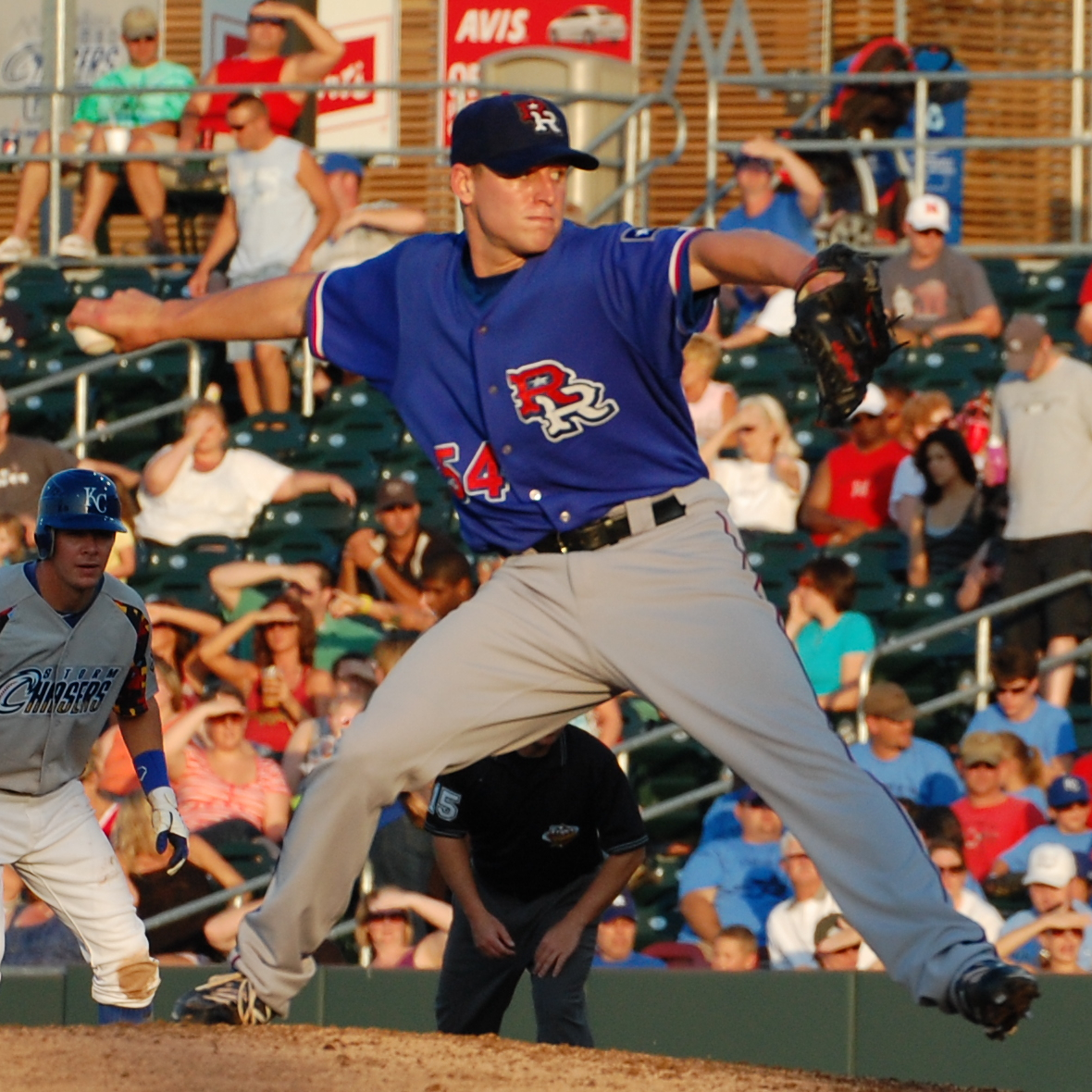
Ramírez pitching for the Round Rock Express, triple-A affiliates of the Texas Rangers, in 2012

On August 17, 2011 he was promoted to Triple-A at Round Rock in place of Eric Hurley who was placed on the disabled list with viral infection. Prior to his promotion, on July 15, Ramírez was sent to rehab in Double-A Frisco, Texas, due to a sore shoulder. He was quoted as saying to MLB.com that the absence had not bothered him.

On November 18, 2011, Ramírez was added to the Rangers' 40-man roster.

=== Chicago Cubs ===
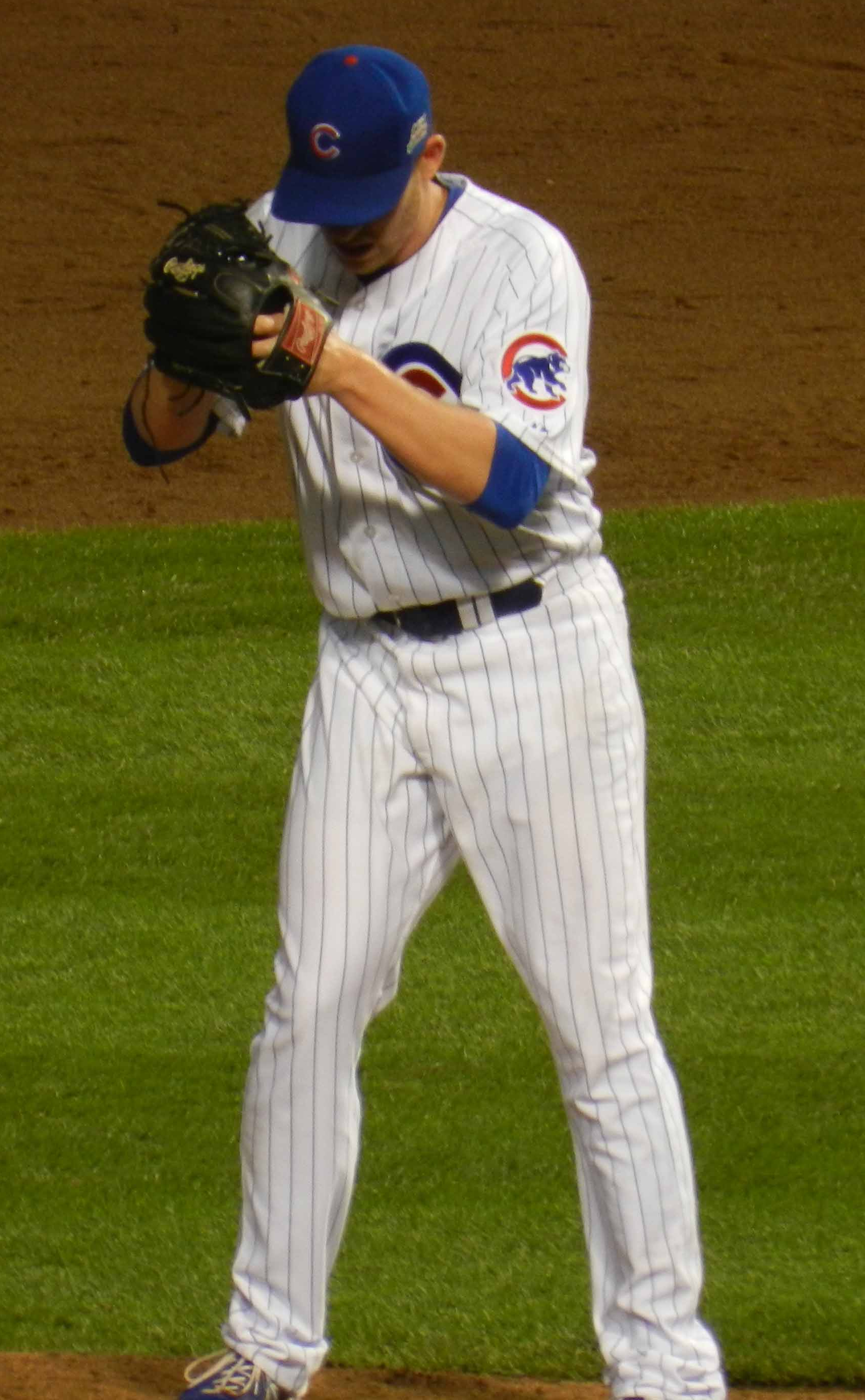
Ramírez pitching for the Chicago Cubs in 2014

On August 23, 2013, Ramírez was traded to the Chicago Cubs as the player to be named later in the July 2013 trade of Matt Garza. By June 9, 2014, through 14 innings pitched, he had struck out 23 players while having a 0.71 WHIP ratio.

On June 5, 2014, Ramírez earned his first career save in a victory over the New York Mets.

Ramírez finished the year with a 1.44 ERA in 43.2 innings pitched

=== Milwaukee Brewers ===
On May 31, 2016, Ramírez was claimed off waivers by the Milwaukee Brewers.

=== Minnesota Twins ===
On June 12, 2016, Ramírez was claimed off waivers by the Minnesota Twins. He made 8 appearances for Minnesota, struggling to a 6.14 ERA with 11 strikeouts across 14 2/3 innings pitched. Ramírez was removed from the 40–man roster and sent outright to the Triple–A Rochester Red Wings on July 20. In 16 outings for Rochester, he compiled a 3.10 ERA with 27 strikeouts across 20 1/3 innings of work. Ramírez elected free agency following the season on November 7.

=== San Francisco Giants ===
On November 28, 2016, Ramírez signed a minor league contract with the San Francisco Giants. On April 1, the Giants announced that Ramírez had earned the team's final Opening Day bullpen spot. In 9 games for San Francisco, he recorded an 8.71 ERA with 18 strikeouts across 10 1/3 innings pitched. On April 30, Ramírez was designated for assignment to create room for Bryan Morris, who had his contract selected from Triple-A.

=== Toronto Blue Jays ===
On May 4, 2017, Ramírez was claimed off waivers by the Toronto Blue Jays. He was designated for assignment on May 9 without having thrown a pitch for the Blue Jays. On May 14, Ramírez elected free agency after being outrighted to the minor leagues.

=== New York Mets ===
On May 16, 2017, the New York Mets signed Ramírez. On July 20, the Mets designated Ramírez for assignment.

=== Washington Nationals ===
On July 27, 2017, Ramírez signed a minor league deal with the Washington Nationals. In 14 games for the Triple–A Syracuse Chiefs, he registered a 6.14 ERA with 20 strikeouts in 14 2/3 innings pitched. Ramírez elected free agency following the season on November 6.

=== Cleveland Indians ===
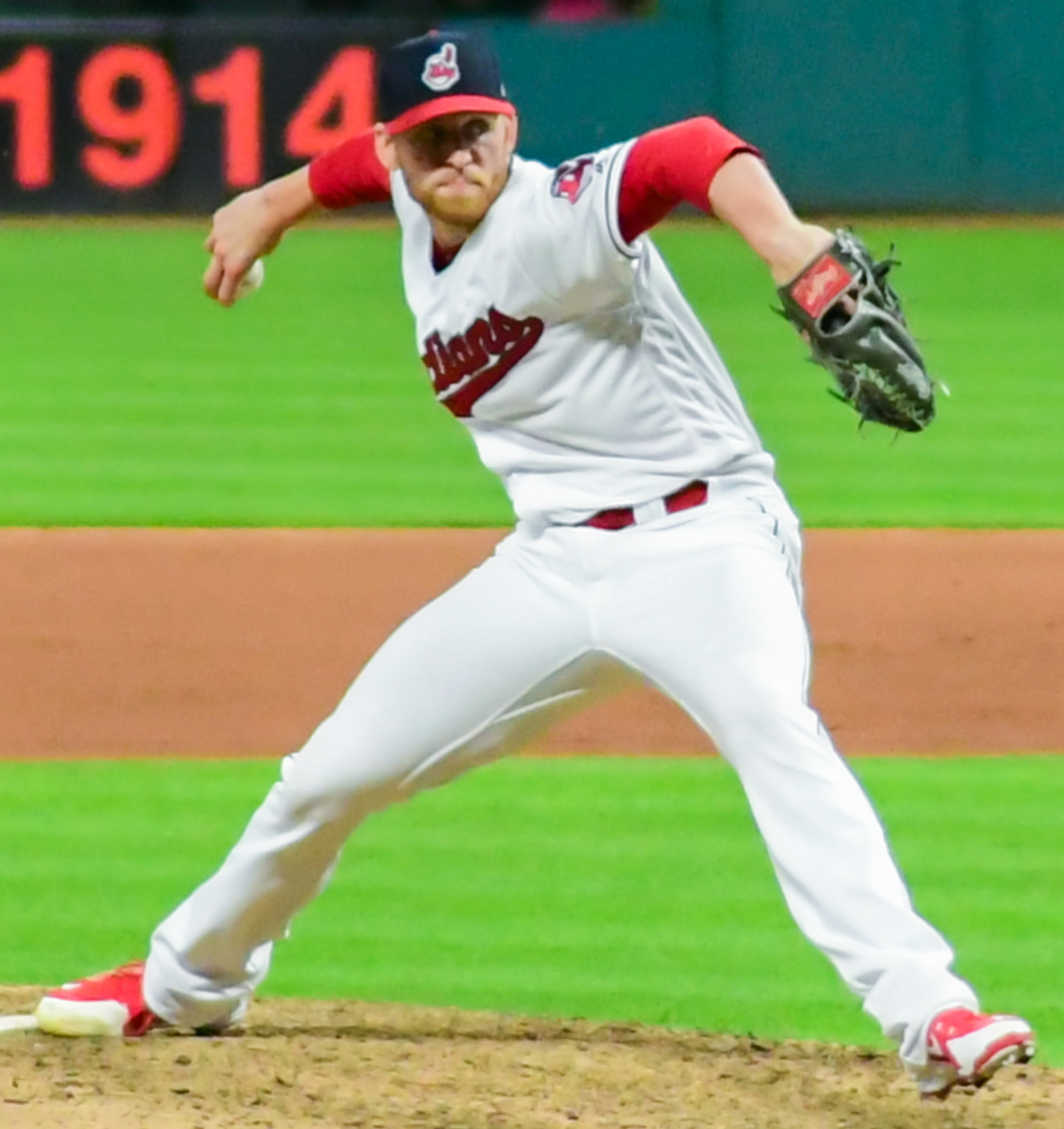
Ramírez pitching for the Cleveland Indians in 2018

Ramírez signed a minor league contract with the Cleveland Indians on November 30, 2017. The Indians purchased Ramírez's contract on May 15, 2018. He finished the season with an ERA of 4.54 in 41 2/3 innings, his most output since his rookie season in 2014.

He began the 2019 season in the bullpen. He was designated for assignment by the Indians on May 18, 2019, after registering an ERA of 5.40 in 16 2/3 innings. After clearing waivers, Ramírez accepted a minor league assignment to the Columbus Clippers, the Indians' Triple-A affiliate, on May 23, 2019. He was released on August 2, 2019.

=== Toronto Blue Jays (second stint) ===
On August 6, 2019, Ramírez signed a minor league contract with the Toronto Blue Jays. He was called up by the Blue Jays on August 11. On September 1, Ramirez was designated for assignment. He declared free agency on September 4.

=== Los Angeles Angels ===
On December 22, 2019, Ramírez signed a minor league deal with the Los Angeles Angels that included an invitation to Spring Training. He did not play in a game in 2020 due to the cancellation of the minor league season because of the COVID-19 pandemic. Ramírez was released by the Angels organization on September 1, 2020.

=== High Point Rockers ===
On April 28, 2023, after several years of inactivity, Ramírez signed with the High Point Rockers of the Atlantic League of Professional Baseball. In 10 games (8 starts) for the Rockers, he logged a 2–3 record and 4.82 ERA with 37 strikeouts across 37 1/3 innings pitched.

On April 15, 2024, Ramírez re–signed with High Point. In 17 games (12 starts) for the Rockers, he posted a 5–4 record and 4.83 ERA with 75 strikeouts over 69 innings. Ramírez was released by High Point on August 13.

== Scouting report ==
According to Baseball America, Ramírez is 6 feet 4 inches (1.93 m) tall, weighs 210 pounds (95 kg), and can throw his fastball at 97 miles per hour (156 km/h).

== Personal ==
Ramírez married Tiffany in October 2014.
