= 2015 Chicago Cubs season =

Chicago Cubs baseball season

2015 Chicago Cubs
- National League Wild Card winners
- League: National League
- Division: Central
- Ballpark: Wrigley Field
- City: Chicago, Illinois
- Record: 97–65 (.599)
- Divisional place: 3rd
- Owners: Tom Ricketts
- President of baseball operations: Theo Epstein
- General managers: Jed Hoyer
- Managers: Joe Maddon
- Television: WGN-TV; CSN Chicago; CSN Chicago Plus; WLS-TV; WPWR-TV (Len Kasper, Jim Deshaies, Luke Stuckmeyer)
- Radio: WBBM (AM); Chicago Cubs Radio Network (Pat Hughes, Ron Coomer, Mark Grote, Len Kasper)
- Stats: ESPN.com; Baseball Reference

The 2015 Chicago Cubs season was the 144th season for the franchise, the 140th in the National League and the 100th at Wrigley Field. The Cubs were managed by Joe Maddon in his first year as Cubs manager and played their home games at Wrigley Field as members of the National League Central.

They began the season on April 5, 2015, in a first-ever night-game home-opener against the St. Louis Cardinals at partially renovated Wrigley Field, and finished the regular season on October 4, 2015, on the road against the Milwaukee Brewers.

The Cubs finished the season with the third-best record in baseball (97–65) which was also the third-best in their division, finishing one game behind the Pittsburgh Pirates (98–64) and three games behind the division winner, the rival St. Louis Cardinals (100–62). As a result, they qualified for the second wild card spot for the postseason, their first postseason appearance since 2008, and defeated the Pirates in the NLWC Game to advance to the NLDS against the Cardinals. The Cubs defeated St. Louis three games to one to advance to the NLCS against the New York Mets, the Cubs' first appearance in the NLCS since 2003. However, they were swept in four games.

In 2015, Forbes valued the Cubs at $1.8 billion, ranking them 17th out of all sports franchises in the world, and the fifth highest in all MLB. The Cubs attendance for the regular season was 2,959,812, up over 300,000 from the previous year.

== Previous season ==
The Cubs finished the 2014 season 73–89 to finish in last place in the Central Division. Following the season, the Cubs fired manager Rick Renteria and hired former Tampa Bay Rays manager Joe Maddon.

== Offseason ==
=== Stadium changes ===
On Monday, September 29, one day after the conclusion of the 2014 season, a $575 million four-year renovation project to Wrigley Field began. The bleachers in left and right field were expanded, the stadium was extended further onto both Waveland and Sheffield Avenues, and seven new outfield signs were installed along with a 5,700-square-foot jumbotron scoreboard in the left field bleachers and a 2,400 square foot video scoreboard in the right field bleachers. The parking lots along Clark Street were excavated for underground players' locker rooms and lounges.

=== Coaching changes ===
The Cubs decided not to retain Mike Brumley as the assistant hitting coach. Bill Mueller, the hitting coach, resigned over the decision. On October 9. 2014 John Mallee, formerly the Astros hitting coach, was hired as his replacement. Eric Hinske was the assistant hitting coach and Doug Dascenzo was signed to replace him as first base/outfield coach. In late October 2014, quality assurance coach Jose Castro resigned to work with Atlanta Braves hitting coach Kevin Seitzer.

On October 31, the Cubs fired first year manager Rick Renteria. On Monday, November 3, The Cubs announced the signing of Joe Maddon to a five-year contract as manager of the team. Former Cub Henry Blanco was hired to be the quality assurance coach on November 22. At the start of the 2015 season, Brandon Hyde went from 2014 season bench coach to first base and Doug Dascenzo was the outfield coach. Dave Martinez was bench coach. On February 24, 2015, Manny Ramirez was hired as a batting consultant, splitting time between Chicago and AAA Iowa. Also, Kevin Youkilis was given a part-time job as a scouting and player development consultant.

=== Broadcast changes ===
In June 2014, the Cubs announced an end to their radio play-by-play history on WGN (720-AM) radio which dated back to 1924. In a new partnership with CBS Radio, the radio broadcast of their games moved to WBBM (780-AM) for the 2015 season.

The Cubs finalized a new television broadcast agreement with long-time over-the-air carrier WGN-TV (Channel 9), in which the station would carry a reduced slate of 45 games per season. The team also signed a new broadcast agreement with ABC-owned station WLS-TV (Channel 7), in which they will show 25 games annually; this deal replaced WCIU-TV as the Cubs' secondary over-the-air television outlet. Both agreements with WLS and WGN run through the end of the 2019 season. Play-by-play announcer Len Kasper and color commentator Jim Deshaies became employees of the Cubs rather than WGN-TV.

As a result of a new programming strategy implemented by Tribune Media for WGN America, the cable superstation ceased televising Cubs games (as well as that of the Chicago White Sox and Bulls) to a national audience as of January 2015. This marked the end of a 36-season run of Cubs games televised on the national version of WGN-TV.

The Cubs created affiliate stations to complement the 2015 television and radio schedule.

=== Transactions ===
- RHP Donn Roach was claimed off the waiver list from the San Diego Padres.
- The Atlanta Braves traded second baseman Tommy La Stella to the Cubs for relief pitcher Arodys Vizcaíno and international signing bonus slots.
- RHP Jason Hammel signed with Chicago Cubs for a 2-year, $18 million contract after being previously traded in July 2014 to the Oakland Athletics in exchange for top prospect Addison Russell, among other players.
- C Miguel Montero was traded by the Arizona Diamondbacks to the Chicago Cubs in exchange for minor league RHP Jefferson Mejia and RHP Zack Godley. Mejia pitched for the Arizona League Cubs in 2014 and Godley pitched for the Daytona Cubs and the Kane County Cougars in 2014.
- LHP Jon Lester signed with the Chicago Cubs for six years for $155 million, with a vested option for a seventh. He was officially introduced on December 15, 2014.
- Jonathan Herrera signed as a free agent with the Chicago Cubs in December 2014.
- Infielder Logan Watkins and relief pitcher Donn Roach were designated for assignment on December 19 to make space for recently claimed Ryan Lavarnway and Shane Peterson.
- On December 23, 2014, The Cubs announced that they had signed catcher David Ross to a two-year, $5 million contract.
- Chris Denorfia signed a one-year contract worth a guaranteed $2.6 million with $400k in incentives with the Chicago Cubs on January 9, 2015.
- On January 19, 2015, outfielder Dexter Fowler was traded to the Cubs from the Houston Astros for Luis Valbuena and Dan Straily.
- Gonzalez Germen was claimed off waivers by the Chicago Cubs on January 23, 2015.
- On March 5, Cubs signed RHP Phil Coke.

== Regular season ==
=== Game log ===
2015 game log (97–65)
April: 12–8 (Home: 6–5; Away: 6–3)

#	Date	Opponent	Score	Win	Loss	Save	Attendance	Record
1	April 5	Cardinals	0–3	Wainwright (1–0)	**Lester** (0–1)	Rosenthal (1)	35,055	0–1
–	April 7	Cardinals	**Postponed (inclement weather)** (Makeup date: July 7)					
2	April 8	Cardinals	2–0	**Arrieta** (1–0)	Lynn (0–1)	**Rondón** (1)	26,814	1–1
3	April 10	@ Rockies	1–5	Bergman (1–0)	**Wood** (0–1)	—	49,303	1–2
4	April 11	@ Rockies	9–5	**Hammel** (1–0)	Kendrick (1–1)	—	43,812	2–2
5	April 12	@ Rockies	6–5	**Ramirez** (1–0)	Hawkins (1–1)	**Rondon** (2)	41,363	3–2
6	April 13	Reds	7–6 (10)	**Rondon** (1–0)	Parra (0–1)	—	26,390	4–2
7	April 14	Reds	0–3	DeSclafani (1–0)	**Arrieta** (1–1)	Chapman (3)	27.525	4–3
8	April 15	Reds	5–0	**Wood** (1–1)	Marquis (0–1)	—	29,205	5–3
9	April 17	Padres	4–5	Shields (2–0)	**Schlitter** (0–1)	Kimbrel (4)	32,138	5–4
10	April 18	Padres	7–6 (11)	**Rosscup** (1–0)	Kimbrel (0–1)	—	33,958	6–4
11	April 19	Padres	2–5	Cashner (1–2)	**Lester** (0–2)	Benoit (1)	29,113	6–5
12	April 20	@ Pirates	5–2	**Arrieta** (2–1)	Caminero (0–1)	—	11,777	7–5
13	April 21	@ Pirates	9–8	**Jackson** (1–0)	Melancon (0–1)	**Rondon** (3)	13,680	8–5
14	April 22	@ Pirates	3–4	Worley (2–1)	**Hammel**(1–1)	Watson (1)	15,101	8–6
15	April 23	@ Pirates	4–5	Liz (1–1)	**Schlitter** (0–2)	Melancon (3)	22,224	8–7
16	April 24	@ Reds	7–3 (11)	**Motte** (1–0)	Badenhop (0–1)	—	39,891	9–7
–	April 25	@ Reds	**Postponed (inclement weather)** (Makeup date: July 22)					
17	April 26	@ Reds	5–2	**Arrieta** (3–1)	DeSclafani (2–1)	**Rondon** (4)	38,954	10–7
18	April 27	Pirates	4–0	**Hammel (2–1)**	Worley (2–2)	—	29,159	11–7
19	April 28	Pirates	6–2	**Wood** (2–1)	Locke (2–1)	—	29,915	12–7
20	April 29	Pirates	1–8	Cole (4–0)	**Hendricks** (0–1)	—	30,634	12–8

May: 14–14 (Home: 9–6; Away: 5–8)

#	Date	Opponent	Score	Win	Loss	Save	Attendance	Record
21	May 1	Brewers	1–0	**Lester** (1–2)	Peralta (0–4)	**Rondon** (5)	31,128	13–8
22	May 2	Brewers	1–6	Fiers (1–3)	**Arrieta** (3–2)	—	34,878	13–9
23	May 3	Brewers	3–5	Smith (1–0)	**Strop** (0–1)	Rodríguez (4)	33,398	13–10
24	May 4	@ Cardinals	9–10	Socalovich (2–0)	**Strop** (0–2)	Maness (2)	41,981	13–11
25	May 5	@ Cardinals	4–7	Harris (1–0)	**Jackson** (1–1)	Rosenthal (9)	41,613	13–12
26	May 6	@ Cardinals	6–5	**Lester** (2–2)	Lynn (1–3)	**Rondon** (6)	42,207	14–12
27	May 7	@ Cardinals	1–5	Lackey (1–2)	**Arrieta** (3–3)	Rosenthal (10)	44,472	14–13
28	May 8	@ Brewers	7–6	**Hammel** (3–1)	Nelson (1–3)	—	38,283	15–13
29	May 9	@ Brewers	4–12	Lohse (2–4)	**Wood** (2–2)	—	39,600	15–14
30	May 10	@ Brewers	2–3 (10)	Blazek (3–0)	**Motte** (1–1)	—	41,467	15–15
31	May 11	Mets	4–3	**Lester** (3–2)	deGrom (3–4)	**Rondon** (7)	32,980	16–15
32	May 12	Mets	6–1	**Arrieta** (4–3)	Syndergaard (0–1)	—	31,542	17–15
33	May 13	Mets	2–1	**Rondon** (2–0)	Torres (1–2)	—	33,709	18–15
34	May 14	Mets	6–5	**Strop** (1–2)	Niese (3–3)	**Rondon** (8)	31,497	19–15
35	May 15	Pirates	11–10 (12)	**Jackson** (2–1)	Liz (1–3)	—	33,617	20–15
36	May 16	Pirates	4–1	**Lester** (4–2)	Cole (5–2)	**Wood** (1)	38,883	21–15
37	May 17	Pirates	0–3	Burnett (3–1)	**Arrieta** (4–4)	Melancon (9)	36,289	21–16
38	May 19	@ Padres	3–4	Benoit (4–1)	**Russell** (0–1)	Kimbrel (11)	25,917	21–17
39	May 20	@ Padres	3–2	**Grimm** (1–0)	T. Ross (2–4)	**Rondon** (9)	25.028	22–17
40	May 21	@ Padres	3–0	**Hendricks** (1–1)	Despaigne (2–3)	—	30.021	23–17
41	May 22	@ Diamondbacks	4–5 (13)	Delgado (2–2)	**Rosscup** (1–1)	—	34,498	23–18
42	May 23	@ Diamondbacks	9–6	**Motte**(2–1)	Burgos (0–2)	**Strop** (1)	30,502	24–18
43	May 24	@ Diamondbacks	3–4	Hellickson (2–3)	**Hammel** (3–2)	Ziegler (2)	39,660	24–19
44	May 25	Nationals	1–2	Roark (1–2)	**Grimm** (1–1)	Storen (15)	38,463	24–20
45	May 26	Nationals	3–2	**Rondon** (3–0)	Grace (2–1)	—	30,440	25–20
46	May 27	Nationals	0–3	Scherzer (6–3)	**Lester** (4–3)	Storen (16)	34,215	25–21
47	May 29	Royals	4–8	Herrera (1–1)	**Strop** (1–3)	—	34,273	25–22
–	May 30	Royals	**Postponed (inclement weather)** (Makeup date: September 28)					
48	May 31	Royals	2–1 (11)	**Rosscup** (2–1)	Madson (0–1)	—	37,766	26–22

June: 14–13 (Home: 5–4; Away: 9–9)

#	Date	Opponent	Score	Win	Loss	Save	Attendance	Record
49	June 1	@ Marlins	5–1	**Hammel** (4–2)	Urena (0–2)	—	20,964	27–22
50	June 2	@ Marlins	2–5	Hand (1–1)	**Hendricks** (1–2)	Ramos (5)	23,789	27–23
51	June 3	@ Marlins	3–7	Haren (6–2)	**Lester** (4–4)	—	22,962	27–24
52	June 4	@ Nationals	2–1	**Arrieta** (5–4)	Gonzalez (4–3)	**Rondón** (10)	35,465	28–24
53	June 5	@ Nationals	5–7	Roark (2–2)	**Wada** (0–1)	–	36,124	28–25
54	June 6	@ Nationals	4–2	**Hammel** (5–2)	Ross (0–1)	**Strop** (2)	38,214	29–25
55	June 7	@ Nationals	6–3	**Hendricks** (2–2)	Zimmermann (5–3)	**Motte** (1)	40,939	30–25
56	June 9	@ Tigers	0–6	Sanchez (4–7)	**Lester** (4–5)	—	33,301	30–26
57	June 10	@ Tigers	12–3	**Arrieta** (6–4)	Greene (4–6)	—	33,397	31–26
58	June 11	Reds	6–3	**Wood** (3–2)	Lorenzen (1–2)	**Rondón** (11)	35,031	32–26
59	June 12	Reds	4–5 (10)	Hoover (5–0)	**Rondón** (3–1)	Chapman (13)	40,016	32–27
60	June 13	Reds	4–3	**Motte** (3–1)	Cingrani (0–3)	—	40,693	33–27
61	June 14	Reds	2–1 (11)	**Schlitter** (1–2)	Badenhop (0–2)	—	33,201	34–27
–	June 15	Indians	**Postponed (inclement weather)** (Makeup date: August 24)					
62	June 16	Indians	0–6	Bauer (6–3)	**Arrieta** (6–5)	—	35,914	34–28
63	June 17	@ Indians	17–0	**Wada** (1–1)	Marcum (3–2)	—	15,572	35–28
64	June 18	@ Indians	3–4	McAllister (2–2)	**Wood** (3–3)	Shaw (1)	15,891	35–29
65	June 19	@ Twins	2–7	Hughes (5–6)	**Hendricks** (2–3)	—	36,817	35–30
66	June 20	@ Twins	4–1 (10)	**Motte (4–1)**	Boyer (2–3)	**Rondon** (12)	40,066	36–30
67	June 21	@ Twins	8–0	**Arrieta** (7–5)	Gibson (4–6)	—	40,273	37–30
68	June 22	Dodgers	4–2	**Wood** (4–3)	Kershaw (5–5)	**Motte** (2)	35,147	38–30
69	June 23	Dodgers	1–0 (10)	**Motte** (5–1)	Peralta (1–1)	—	36,799	39–30
70	June 24	Dodgers	2–5	Howell (3–1)	**Hendricks** (2–4)	Jansen (10)	36.653	39–31
71	June 25	Dodgers	0–4	Frias (5–5)	**Lester** (4–6)	—	41,498	39–32
72	June 26	@ Cardinals	2–3	Maness (2–0)	**Grimm** (1–2)	—	45,558	39–33
73	June 27	@ Cardinals	1–8	Wacha (10–3)	**Roach** (0–1)	Villanueva (1)	46,407	39–34
74	June 28	@ Cardinals	1–4	Martinez (9–3)	**Hammel** (5–3)	Rosenthal (23)	45,384	39–35
75	June 30	@ Mets	1–0	**Hendricks** (3–4)	Niese (3–8)	**Motte** (3)	27,084	40–35

July: 15–12 (Home: 7–9; Away: 8–3)

#	Date	Opponent	Score	Win	Loss	Save	Attendance	Record
76	July 1	@ Mets	2–0 (11)	**Motte** (6–1)	Torres (2–4)	**Grimm** (1)	23,906	41–35
77	July 2	@ Mets	6–1	**Arrieta** (8–5)	deGrom (8–6)	—	27,207	42–35
78	July 3	Marlins	1–2	Koehler (7–4)	**Hammel** (5–4)	Ramos (13)	41,212	42–36
79	July 4	Marlins	7–2	**Richard** (1–0)	Cosart (1–4)	—	37,898	43–36
80	July 5	Marlins	2–0	**Hendricks** (4–4)	Latos (3–6)	**Motte** (4)	37,766	44–36
81	July 6	Cardinals	0–6	Lackey (7–5)	**Lester**(4–7)	—	37,609	44–37
82	July 7	Cardinals	7–4	**Arrieta** (9–5)	Lyons (2–1)	—	34,368	45–37
83	July 7	Cardinals	5–3	**Wood** (5–3)	Maness (3–1)	**Motte** (5)	35,703	46–37
84	July 8	Cardinals	5–6	Socolovich (3–1)	**Strop** (1–4)	Rosenthal (25)	37,993	46–38
85	July 10	White Sox	0–1	Petricka (3–2)	**Rondon** (3–2)	Robertson (19)	41,580	46–39
86	July 11	White Sox	1–5	Sale (8–4)	**Lester** (4–8)	—	41,596	46–40
87	July 12	White Sox	3–1	**Arrieta** (10–5)	Quintana (4–9)	—	41,688	47–40
**86th All-Star Game in Cincinnati, Ohio**
88	July 17	@ Braves	2–4	Vizciano (1–0)	**Strop** (1–5)	Johnson (6)	42,532	47–41
89	July 18	@ Braves	4–0	**Lester** (5–8)	Banuelos (1–1)	—	45,758	48–41
90	July 19	@ Braves	4–1	**Arrieta** (11–5)	Miller (5–6)	—	31,690	49–41
91	July 20	@ Reds	4–5	Matthews (1–1)	**Grimm** (1–3)	Chapman (19)	34,900	49–42
92	July 21	@ Reds	5–4 (13)	**Motte** (7–1)	Adcock (1–2)	**Grimm** (2)	36,845	50–42
93	July 22	@ Reds	1–9	Leake (8–5)	**Hendricks** (4–5)	—	35,093	50–43
94	July 22	@ Reds	6–5	**Rondon** (4–2)	Chapman (3–4)	**Motte** (6)	39,183	51–43
95	July 24	Phillies	3–5 (10)	Giles (5–2)	**Russell** (0–2)	Papelbon (17)	41,230	51–44
96	July 25	Phillies	0–5	Hamels (6–7)	**Arrieta** (11–6)	—	41,683	51–45
97	July 26	Phillies	5–11	Nola (1–1)	**Hammel** (5–5)	—	41,123	51–46
98	July 27	Rockies	9–8	**Soriano** (1–0)	Axford (3–4)	—	35,070	52–46
99	July 28	Rockies	2–7	Flande (1–1)	**Beeler** (0–1)	—	36.747	52–47
100	July 29	Rockies	3–2	**Lester** (6–8)	Butler (3–7)	**Rondon** (13)	38,874	53–47
101	July 30	@ Brewers	5–2	**Soriano** (2–0)	Smith (4–2)	**Rondon** (14)	36,206	54–47
102	July 31	@ Brewers	4–1	**Hammel** (6–5)	Jungmann (5–3)	**Rondon** (15)	35,669	55–47

August: 19–9 (Home: 12–3; Away: 7–6)

#	Date	Opponent	Score	Win	Loss	Save	Attendance	Record
103	August 1	@ Brewers	4–2	**Hendricks** (5–5)	Garza (5–12)	**Hunter** (1)	41,720	56–47
104	August 2	@ Brewers	4–3	**Richard** (2–0)	Lohse (5–13)	**Rondon** (16)	38,536	57–47
—	August 3	@ Pirates	**Postponed (inclement weather)** (Makeup date: September 15)					
105	August 4	@ Pirates	5–0	**Arrieta** (12–6)	Happ (4–7)	—	34,993	58–47
106	August 5	@ Pirates	5–7	Bastardo (3–1)	**Wood** (5–4)	Melancon (34)	35,759	58–48
107	August 6	Giants	5–4	**Grimm** (2–3)	Heston (11–6)	**Rondon** (17)	41,242	59–48
108	August 7	Giants	7–3	**Lester** (7–8)	Vogelsong (7–8)	**Rondon** (18)	41,311	60–48
109	August 8	Giants	8–6	**Hendricks** (6–5)	Cain (2–3)	**Grimm** (3)	41,305	61–48
110	August 9	Giants	2–0	**Arrieta** (13–6)	Peavy (2–5)	**Rondon** (19)	39,939	62–48
111	August 11	Brewers	6–3	**Haren** (8–7)	Jungmann (6–4)	**Russell** (1)	37,109	63–48
112	August 12	Brewers	3–2 (10)	**Hunter** (3–2)	Blazek (5–3)	—	36,438	64–48
113	August 13	Brewers	9–2	**Lester** (8–8)	Cravy (0–4)	—	40,799	65–48
114	August 14	@ White Sox	6–5	**Richard** (3–0)	Samardzija (8–8)	**Rondon** (20)	36,386	66–48
115	August 15	@ White Sox	6–3	**Arrieta** (14–6)	Quintana (6–10)	**Rondon** (21)	39,579	67–48
116	August 16	@ White Sox	1–3	Sale (11–7)	**Haren** (8–8)	Robertson (24)	39,475	67–49
117	August 18	Tigers	8–10	Alburquerque (3–0)	**Strop** (1–6)	—	39,684	67–50
118	August 19	Tigers	8–15	Feliz (3–3)	**Lester** (8–9)	—	40,310	67–51
119	August 20	Braves	7–1	**Arrieta** (15–6)	Foltynewicz (4–5)	—	34,633	68–51
120	August 21	Braves	5–3	**Motte** (8–1)	Miller (5–10)	**Rondon** (22)	39,211	69–51
121	August 22	Braves	9–7	**Strop** (2–6)	Jackson (2–2)	**Rondon** (23)	41,196	70–51
122	August 23	Braves	9–3	**Hammel** (7–5)	Wisler (5–4)	—	39,581	71–51
123	August 24	Indians	2–1	**Rondon** (5–2)	McAllister (3–4)	—	36,283	72–51
124	August 25	@ Giants	8–5	**Arrieta** (16–6)	Cain (2–4)	**Rondon** (24)	41,595	73–51
125	August 26	@ Giants	2–4	Peavy (4–2)	**Hendricks** (6–6)	Casilla (31)	41,640	73–52
126	August 27	@ Giants	1–9	Bumgarner (16−6)	**Haren** (8–9)	—	41,847	73–53
127	August 28	@ Dodgers	1–4	Kershaw (11−6)	**Hammel** (7−6)	Jansen (26)	44,874	73–54
128	August 29	@ Dodgers	2–5	Howell (5−1)	**Lester** (8−10)	Jansen (27)	51,697	73–55
129	August 30	@ Dodgers	2–0	**Arrieta** (17–6)	Wood (9–9)	—	46,679	74–55
130	August 31	Reds	5–13	Mattheus (2−4)	**Grimm** (2−4)	Chapman (26)	34,017	74–56

September: 19–9 (Home: 10–5; Away: 9–4)

#	Date	Opponent	Score	Win	Loss	Save	Attendance	Record
131	September 1	Reds	5–4	**Rodney** (6−5)	Badenhop (1−4)	**Rondon** (25)	33,756	75–56
132	September 2	Reds	4–7	Hoover (7−0)	**Rondon** (5−3)	Chapman (27)	31,165	75–57
133	September 4	Diamondbacks	14–5	**Lester** (9−10)	Godley (4−1)	—	36,132	76–57
134	September 5	Diamondbacks	2–0	**Arrieta** (18–6)	Ray (3–11)	**Rondon** (26)	40,690	77–57
135	September 6	Diamondbacks	6–4	**Grimm** (3−4)	De La Rosa (12−7)	—	41,183	78–57
136	September 7	@ Cardinals	9–0	**Haren** (9–9)	Lynn (11–9)	—	45,986	79–57
137	September 8	@ Cardinals	8–5	**Hammel** (8–6)	Wacha (15–5)	**Rondón** (27)	42,206	80–57
138	September 9	@ Cardinals	3–4	Broxton (2−1)	**Richard** (3−1)	Rosenthal (43)	43,557	80–58
139	September 11	@ Phillies	5–1	**Arrieta** (19–6)	Morgan (5–6)	—		81–58
140	September 11	@ Phillies	7–3	**Hendricks** (7–6)	Asher (0–3)	**Rondón** (28)	22,538	82–58
141	September 12	@ Phillies	5–7	Giles (6–2)	**Rondón** (5–4)	—	20,813	82–59
142	September 13	@ Phillies	4–7	Hinojosa (1–0)	**Richard** (3–2)	Giles (13)	23,450	82–60
143	September 15	@ Pirates	4–5	Watson (4–1)	**Grimm** (3–5)	Melancon (46)	31,488	82–61
144	September 15	@ Pirates	2–1	**Lester** (10–10)	Happ (9–8)	—	25,914	83–61
145	September 16	@ Pirates	3–2 (12)	**Rondón** (6–4)	Worley (4–6)	—	31,945	84–61
146	September 17	@ Pirates	9–6	**Richard** (4–2)	Morton (9–8)	**Wood** (2)	28,228	85–61
147	September 18	Cardinals	8–3	**Hunter** (4−2)	Maness (4−2)	—	40,846	86–61
148	September 19	Cardinals	5–4	**Cahill** (1–3)	Wacha (16–6)	**Strop** (3)	40,994	87–61
149	September 20	Cardinals	3–4	Martinez (14–7)	**Lester** (10–11)	Rosenthal (46)	40,962	87–62
150	September 21	Brewers	9–5	**Hammel** (9–6)	Peralta (5–10)	—	34,373	88–62
151	September 22	Brewers	4–0	**Arrieta** (20–6)	Cravy (0–8)	—	36,270	89–62
152	September 23	Brewers	1–4	Davies (2–2)	**Hendricks** (7–7)	Rodrigues (35)	37,559	89–63
153	September 25	Pirates	2–3	Cole (18–8)	**Lester** (10−12)	Melancon (51)	40,432	89–64
154	September 26	Pirates	0–4	Liriano (12−7)	**Hammel** (9−7)	—	41,150	89–65
155	September 27	Pirates	4–0	**Arrieta** (21−6)	Burnett (9-6)	—	40,617	90–65
156	September 28	Royals	1–0 (11)	**Rodney** (7−5)	Almonte (0−2)	–	40,552	91–65
157	September 29	@ Reds	4–1	**Haren** (10–9)	Smith (0–3)	**Wood** (3)	18,168	92–65
158	September 30	@ Reds	10–3	**Lester** (11–12)	DeScalfani (9–13)	—	21,397	93–65

October: 4–0 (Home: 0–0; Away: 4–0)

#	Date	Opponent	Score	Win	Loss	Save	Attendance	Record
159	October 1	@ Reds	5–3	**Hammel** (10–7)	Lamb (1–5)	**Rondon** (29)	26,352	94–65
160	October 2	@ Brewers	6–1	**Arrieta** (22–6)	Pena (2–1)	—	30,044	95–65
161	October 3	@ Brewers	1–0	**Hendricks** (8–7)	Wagner (0–2)	**Rondon** (30)	35,291	96–65
162	October 4	@ Brewers	3–1	**Haren** (11–9)	Lopez (1–1)	**Wood** (4)	32,959	97–65

Legend: = Win = Loss = Postponement
Bold = Cubs team member

=== Season standings ===
NL Central
Team	W	L	Pct.	GB	Home	Road
St. Louis Cardinals	100	62	.617	—	55‍–‍26	45‍–‍36
Pittsburgh Pirates	98	64	.605	2	53‍–‍28	45‍–‍36
Chicago Cubs	97	65	.599	3	49‍–‍32	48‍–‍33
Milwaukee Brewers	68	94	.420	32	34‍–‍47	34‍–‍47
Cincinnati Reds	64	98	.395	36	34‍–‍47	30‍–‍51

Division leaders
Team	W	L	Pct.
St. Louis Cardinals	100	62	.617
Los Angeles Dodgers	92	70	.568
New York Mets	90	72	.556

Wild Card teams (Top 2 teams qualify for postseason)
Team	W	L	Pct.	GB
Pittsburgh Pirates	98	64	.605	+1
Chicago Cubs	97	65	.599	—
San Francisco Giants	84	78	.519	13
Washington Nationals	83	79	.512	14
Arizona Diamondbacks	79	83	.488	18
San Diego Padres	74	88	.457	23
Miami Marlins	71	91	.438	26
Milwaukee Brewers	68	94	.420	29
Colorado Rockies	68	94	.420	29
Atlanta Braves	67	95	.414	30
Cincinnati Reds	64	98	.395	33
Philadelphia Phillies	63	99	.389	34

=== Record vs. opponents ===
2015 National League record Source: MLB Standings Grid – 2015
Team	AZ	ATL	CHC	CIN	COL	LAD	MIA	MIL	NYM	PHI	PIT	SD	SF	STL	WSH	AL
Arizona	—	3–3	2–4	6–1	13–6	6–13	5–2	5–2	2–5	2–4	1–5	9–10	11–8	0–7	3–4	11–9
Atlanta	3–3	—	1–6	3–4	1–6	3–3	10–9	5–2	8–11	11–8	2–4	2–5	3–4	4–2	5–14	6–14
Chicago	4–2	6–1	—	13–6	4–2	3–4	3–3	14–5	7–0	2–5	11–8	3–3	5–2	8–11	4–3	10–10
Cincinnati	1–6	4–3	6–13	—	2–4	1–6	3–4	9–10	0–7	4–2	11–8	2–4	2–5	7–12	5–1	7–13
Colorado	6–13	6–1	2–4	4–2	—	8–11	2–5	5–1	0–7	5–2	1–6	7–12	11–8	3–4	3–3	5–15
Los Angeles	13–6	3–3	4–3	6–1	11–8	—	4–2	4–3	3–4	5–2	1–5	14–5	8–11	2–5	4–2	10–10
Miami	2–5	9–10	3–3	4–3	5–2	2–4	—	4–2	8–11	9–10	1–6	2–5	5–2	1–5	9–10	7–13
Milwaukee	2–5	2–5	5–14	10–9	1–5	3–4	2–4	—	3–3	7–0	10–9	5–2	1–5	6–13	3–4	8–12
New York	5–2	11–8	0–7	7–0	7–0	4–3	11–8	3–3	—	14–5	0–6	2–4	3–3	3–4	11–8	9–11
Philadelphia	4–2	8–11	5–2	2–4	2–5	2–5	10–9	0–7	5–14	—	2–5	5–1	1–5	2–5	7–12	8–12
Pittsburgh	5–1	4–2	8–11	8–11	6–1	5–1	6–1	9–10	6–0	5–2	—	5–2	6–1	9–10	3–4	13–7
San Diego	10–9	5–2	3–3	4–2	12–7	5–14	5–2	2–5	4–2	1–5	2–5	—	8–11	4–3	2–5	7–13
San Francisco	8–11	4–3	2–5	5–2	8–11	11–8	2–5	5–1	3–3	5–1	1–6	11–8	—	2–4	4–3	13–7
St. Louis	7–0	2–4	11–8	12–7	4–3	5–2	5–1	13–6	4–3	5–2	10–9	3–4	4–2	—	4–2	11–9
Washington	4–3	14–5	3–4	1–5	3–3	2–4	10–9	4–3	8–11	12–7	4–3	5–2	3–4	2–4	—	8–12

=== Opening Day starters ===
Opening Day Starters
Name	Pos.
Dexter Fowler	CF
Jorge Soler	RF
Anthony Rizzo	1B
Starlin Castro	SS
Chris Coghlan	LF
Mike Olt	3B
David Ross	C
Jon Lester	SP
Tommy La Stella	2B

=== Season summary ===
==== April ====
At the conclusion of the first month of the season the Cubs had a record of 12–8. It was their first winning April since the 2008 season. They led the National League in stolen bases with 25, were third in on-base percentage with .329, and sixth in acquiring walks with 71. The pitching staff allowed the fewest walks in the National League with 41, they were third in WHIP with 1.15, fifth in striking out opposing batters with 181, sixth in opposing players batting average with .240, sixth in earned run average with 3.71 and allowed only 14 home runs against them. During the month, the Cubs played in three extra-inning ballgames, winning all three.

- **April 5** – The Cubs pay tribute to the late Ernie Banks before the first opening night game in Cubs history.
- **April 17** – Heralded rookie Kris Bryant plays in his first Major League game.
- **April 5–30** – Due to delays in the 1060 Project, the entire outfield section was unavailable for use by fans attending Cubs games. Attendance figures for the month of April were affected by approximately 5,000 fans per home game.

==== May ====
At the end of the first two months of the season the Cubs had a record of 26–22. It was the first winning two-month period since the end of the 2008 season. They were third in the National League in stolen bases with 46 and second at receiving walks at 192. They did, however, lead the league in striking out at 541. The pitching staff allowed the second fewest walks in the National League with 140, they were third in WHIP, third in striking out opposing batters, sixth in opposing players batting average with .246, fifth in earned run average with 3.72, and allowed 56 home runs against them.

- **May 11** – Left and center field bleacher seats were available for occupancy for the first time during the season during a night game with the New York Mets.
- **May 14** – The Cubs four-game sweep of the NY Mets was their first over the Mets at Wrigley Field since Aug. 6–9, 1992. The May 14 victory was Joe Maddon's 800th career win.
- **May 31** – For the first time in nearly a half-decade the Cubs finished at or above .500 for two months in a row with a May 31 victory against the Kansas City Royals.
- Kris Bryant received the Major League Baseball Rookie of the Month Award for May.

==== June ====
- **June 11** – The right field bleacher seats were available for occupancy for the first time during the season during a night game with the Cincinnati Reds. Dexter Fowler hit the first home run to land into the newly renovated right-field seats at Wrigley Field when fans were present.
- **June 17** – The Cubs 17–0 victory at Progressive Field against the Cleveland Indians was the largest shutout win by the Cubs since May 13, 1969, a 19–0 win over the Padres at Wrigley Field.
- **June 30** – The Cubs finished 14–13 for the month; the third month in a row with a winning record.

==== July ====
- **July 6** – Anthony Rizzo (1B) and Kris Bryant (3B) were named to the National League All-Star Team.
- **July 13** – At the All-Star break the Cubs had a record of 47–40. They were seventh in Major League baseball in stolen bases with 57 and fourth at receiving walks at 293. They were second in the league in striking out at 799. The pitching staff allowed the fewest hits against in baseball with 140, they were first in WHIP at 1.16, third in striking out opposing batters with 754, first in opposing players batting average with .234, fifth in earned run average with 3.72, and allowed 56 home runs.
- **July 25** – Future Cubs pitcher Cole Hamels then of the Philadelphia Phillies pitched a no-hitter against the Cubs, marking the first time the Cubs have been no-hit in 7,921 games, which was the longest streak in the Major Leagues. It was Hamels last start in a Phillies uniform before he was traded to the Texas Rangers.
- The Cubs finished a fourth month in a row over .500 for the first time since the 2008 season. With a record of 55–47, they were two games out of the second position to qualify for a wild card post-season playoff game.

==== August ====
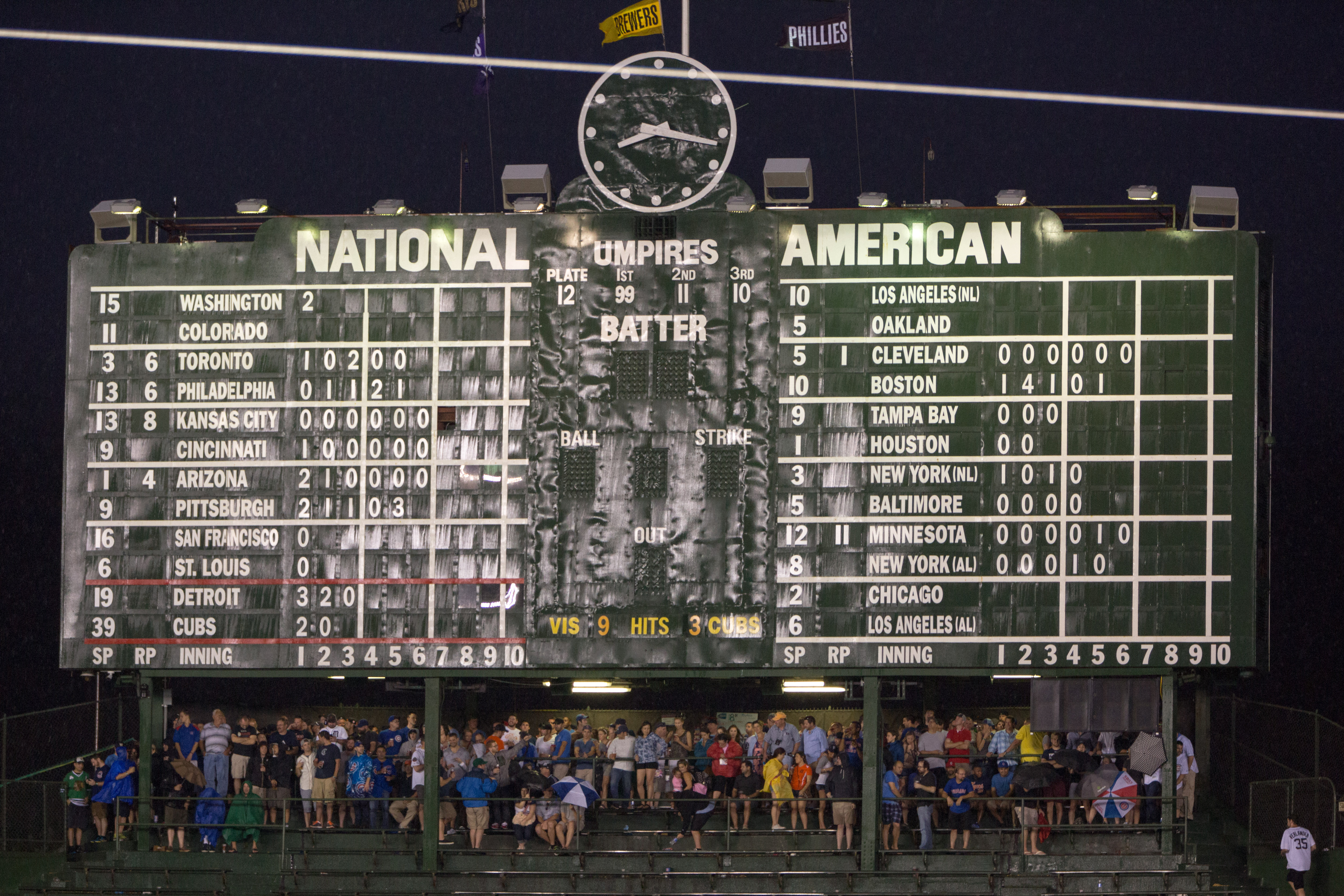
Rain delay at Wrigley Field August 18, 2015

- **August 10** – After a four-game sweep of the San Francisco Giants, the Cubs had moved into the wild card spot and held a 3.5 game lead for the second place wild card qualifier.
- **August 23** – The Cubs swept the Atlanta Braves, their fourth, four-game sweep of the season; first time since 1945. The Cubs led the NL in both home runs and runs scored in the second half.
- **August 30** – Jake Arrieta threw a no hitter against the Los Angeles Dodgers.
- For the fifth month in a row, the Cubs finished a month over .500 with an August record of 19−9. They were 5.5 games ahead of San Francisco for the second wild card slot. They led the majors in striking out with 1,208 and had the lowest team batting average at .241. The pitching staff struck out 1,128 batters (second in the majors) and had a WHIP of 1.20. Kris Bryant was named the NL Rookie of the Month for August and Jake Arrieta was named the Pitcher of the Month and Player of the Week for August 24–30.

==== September ====
- **September 1** – IF Javier Baez and LHP Tsuyoshi Wada were recalled from Triple-A Iowa. Catcher David Ross was activated off the family medical emergency leave list. Later in the month, the Cubs also selected the contracts of OF Quintin Berry, RHP Trevor Cahill, RHP Carl Edwards Jr., RHP Zac Rosscup and RHP Yoervis Medina from Triple-A.
- **September 11** – The Cubs swept a double header against the Phillies guaranteeing them a winning record for the first time since 2009. Jake Arrieta won his 19th game of the season making him the first pitcher in the 2015 season to hit the mark; it was his 16th straight quality start, allowing just one run over eight innings, and dropping his ERA to 1.99.
- **September 25** – The Cubs were defeated by their division rival Pittsburgh, 3–2, but still clinched their first postseason berth since 2008 when the San Francisco Giants lost to the Oakland A's.

==== October ====
- **October 4** – At the conclusion of the season the Cubs had a record of 97–65, third best in Major League Baseball. The 97 wins were the most for a first-year Cubs manager. Their record away from Wrigley Field was 48−33, the Cubs' best road record since 1945. Cubs' hitters led the majors in strikeouts with 1,518 and were third from the bottom with runners in scoring position (.237), but they were fifth in on-base percentage with .321 and first in acquiring walks with 567. The pitching staff allowed the fewest hits in baseball with 1,276, were first in WHIP with 1.15, first in striking out opposing batters with 1,431, and third in earned run average with 3.36. Cubs rookies (Bryant, Schwarber, Russell and Soler) hit 65 home runs, setting a franchise record. The previous high was 58 set in 1966.

==== November ====
- **November 16** – Kris Bryant won the 2015 National League Major League Baseball Rookie of the Year Award by a unanimous first place vote. San Francisco Giants third baseman Matt Duffy and Pittsburgh Pirates infielder Jung-ho Kang placed behind Bryant. Bryant became the first Cub to win the award since catcher Geovany Soto in 2008.
- **November 17** – Manager Joe Maddon won the Manager of the Year Award over St. Louis Cardinals manager Mike Matheny and NL-Champions New York Mets manager Terry Collins. Maddon set the franchise record for most wins in the first season as manager, with 97 wins. Maddon became the seventh manager in MLB history to win the award in both leagues, as Maddon previously won the award in 2008 and 2011 with Tampa Bay. He became the first Cubs manager to win the award since Lou Piniella in 2008.
- **November 18** – Starting pitcher Jake Arrieta won the 2015 NL Cy Young Award over Dodgers pitchers Zack Greinke and Clayton Kershaw. Arrieta had a stellar 2015 campaign, going 22–6 with a 1.77 ERA. Arrieta set a major league record with the lowest second-half ERA over a minimum of 12 starts with an ERA of 0.75. He went 14–1 in the second half of the season, as well as no-hitting the Dodgers on August 30. Arrieta is the first Cub to win the award since Hall of Famer Greg Maddux in 1992. The Cubs also became the first team in MLB to win three major awards since the 2001 Seattle Mariners.

=== Transactions ===
- Back-up catcher Welington Castillo was traded to the Seattle Mariners for right-handed relief pitcher Yoervis Medina on May 19.
- On May 26, released Phil Coke.
- 13-year-veteran right-handed relief pitcher Rafael Soriano agreed to terms on June 8 and reported to a Cubs training facility in the Dominican Republic.
- On July 3, 2015, Clayton Richard was traded by the Pittsburgh Pirates to the Chicago Cubs for cash. He was designated for assignment on July 22 and relief pitcher Yoervis Medina was added to the roster. Richard was optioned to the Iowa Cubs on July 23 and was again designated for assignment on August 3 but was re-signed as a free agent on August 5.
- On July 19, 2015, RHP Edwin Jackson was designated for assignment to make room on the major league roster for reliever Rafael Soriano. On August 14, Jackson signed a contract with the Atlanta Braves for the remainder of the 2015 season.
- On July 31, the Cubs acquired Tommy Hunter from the Baltimore Orioles for Junior Lake and acquired Dan Haren from the Miami Marlins for minor leaguers Elliot Soto and Ivan Pineyro.
- On August 27, RHP Fernando Rodney was traded by the Seattle Mariners to the Cubs for a player to be named later or cash.
- On August 31, CF Austin Jackson was traded by the Seattle Mariners to the Cubs for a player to be named later.
- The Cubs released Rafael Soriano on September 4.

== Roster ==
2015 Chicago Cubs
Roster
Pitchers: 49 Jake Arrieta; 32 Dallas Beeler; 53 Trevor Cahill; 27 Phil Coke; 6 Carl Edwards; 71 Gonzalez Germen; 52 Justin Grimm; 39 Jason Hammel; 50 Dan Haren; 28 Kyle Hendricks; 21 Tommy Hunter; 36 Edwin Jackson; 34 Jon Lester; 33,55 Yoervis Medina; 30 Jason Motte; 54 Neil Ramirez; 33 Clayton Richard; 62 Donn Roach; 57 Fernando Rodney; 56 Héctor Rondón; 59 Zac Rosscup; 40 James Russell; 63 Brian Schlitter; 29 Rafael Soriano; 46 Pedro Strop; 18 Tsuyoshi Wada; 37 Travis Wood	Catchers: 5 Welington Castillo; 47 Miguel Montero; 3 David Ross; 27 Taylor Teagarden; Infielders: 7 Arismendy Alcántara; 9 Javier Báez; 17 Kris Bryant; 13 Starlin Castro; 19 Jonathan Herrera; 11 Tommy La Stella; 20 Mike Olt; 44 Anthony Rizzo; 22 Addison Russell	Outfielders: 29,32 Mike Baxter; 5 Quintin Berry; 8 Chris Coghlan; 15 Chris Denorfia; 24 Dexter Fowler; 27 Austin Jackson; 21 Junior Lake; 12 Kyle Schwarber; 68 Jorge Soler; 41 Matt Szczur	Manager: 70 Joe Maddon; Coaches: 64 Henry Blanco (quality assurance); 58 Mike Borzello (catching); 25 Chris Bosio (pitching); 53 Doug Dascenzo (outfield); 77 Eric Hinske (assistant hitting); 16 Brandon Hyde (first base); 1 Gary Jones (third base); 2 John Mallee (hitting); 4 Dave Martinez (bench); 95 Chad Noble (bullpen catcher); 35 Lester Strode (bullpen)

== Postseason ==
=== Game log ===
2015 postseason game log: 4–5 (Home: 2–2; Away:2–3)
National League Wild Card Game: 1–0 (Away: 1–0)

#	Date	Opponent	Score	Win	Loss	Save	Attendance	Series
1	Oct 7	@ Pirates	4–0	**Arrieta** (1–0)	Cole (0–1)	—	40,889	1–0

National League Division Series: 3–1 (Home: 2–0; Away: 1–1)

#	Date	Opponent	Score	Win	Loss	Save	Attendance	Series
1	Oct 9	@ Cardinals	0–4	Lackey (1–0)	**Lester** (0–1)	—	47,830	0–1
2	Oct 10	@ Cardinals	6–3	**Wood** (1–0)	García (0–1)	**Rondón** (1)	47,859	1–1
3	Oct 12	Cardinals	8–6	**Arrieta** (2–0)	Wacha (0-1)	—	42,411	2–1
4	Oct 13	Cardinals	6–4	**Cahill** (1–0)	Siegrist (0–1)	**Rondón** (2)	42,411	3–1

National League Championship Series: 0–4 (Home: 0–2; Away: 0–2)

#	Date	Opponent	Score	Win	Loss	Save	Attendance	Series
1	Oct 17	@ Mets	2–4	Harvey (1–0)	**Lester** (0–1)	Familia (1)	44,287	0–1
2	Oct 18	@ Mets	1–4	Syndergaard (1–1)	**Arrieta** (2–1)	Familia (2)	44,502	0–2
3	Oct 20	Mets	2–5	deGrom (3-0)	**Cahill** (0-1)	Familia (3)	42,231	0–3
4	Oct 21	Mets	3–8	Colón (1–0)	**Hammel** (0–1)	—	42,227	0–4

Legend: = Win = Loss = Postponement
Bold = Cubs team member

=== Wild Card Game ===
Wednesday, October 7, 2015 7:08 pm CDT at PNC Park in Pittsburgh, Pennsylvania
Team	1	2	3	4	5	6	7	8	9	R	H	E
**Chicago**	1	0	2	0	1	0	0	0	0	**4**	**7**	**0**
Pittsburgh	0	0	0	0	0	0	0	0	0	**0**	**5**	**1**
WP: Jake Arrieta (1–0) LP: Gerrit Cole (0–1); Home runs: CHI: Dexter Fowler (1), Kyle Schwarber (1); PIT: None; Attendance: 40,889

Jake Arrieta pitched a complete game shutout, striking out 11 batters and allowing only five hits to defeat the Pittsburgh Pirates 4–0 in the 2015 National League Wild Card Game. The Cubs were paced offensively by Dexter Fowler and Kyle Schwarber, who combined for five hits in seven at bats, each with a home run. For the first time in 12 years, the Cubs won a postseason game after losing their previous nine postseason games in a row and advanced to play the St. Louis Cardinals in the National League Division Series.

=== Division Series ===
==== Game 1 ====
Friday, October 9, 2015 4:46 pm CDT at Busch Stadium in St. Louis, Missouri
Team	1	2	3	4	5	6	7	8	9	R	H	E
Chicago	0	0	0	0	0	0	0	0	0	**0**	**3**	**0**
**St. Louis**	1	0	0	0	0	0	0	3	X	**4**	**6**	**0**
WP: John Lackey (1–0) LP: Jon Lester (0–1); Home runs: CHI: None; STL: Tommy Pham (1), Stephen Piscotty (1); Attendance: 47,830

John Lackey allowed only three singles in seven innings and the Cardinals beat the Cubs 4–0 in the NLDS opening game. Rookies Tommy Pham and Stephen Piscotty each homered for the Cardinals. Cubs starter, Jon Lester, gave up three runs in 7 1/3 innings and left the game trailing 2–0.

==== Game 2 ====
Saturday, October 10, 2015 3:39 pm CDT at Busch Stadium in St. Louis, Missouri
Team	1	2	3	4	5	6	7	8	9	R	H	E
**Chicago**	0	5	1	0	0	0	0	0	0	**6**	**6**	**0**
St. Louis	1	0	0	0	2	0	0	0	0	**3**	**6**	**2**
WP: Kyle Hendricks (1–0) LP: Jaime García (baseball) (0–1) Sv: Héctor Rondón (1); Home runs: CHI: Jorge Soler (1); STL: Matt Carpenter (1), Kolten Wong (1), Randal Grichuk (1); Attendance: 47,859

In their first divisional game win since 2003, the Cubs got five second inning runs including a two-run home run from Jorge Soler en route to a 6–3 win. Cubs starter Kyle Hendricks pitched well, but allowed a home run to the leadoff batter, third baseman Matt Carpenter in the first, and back-to-back solo shots to Kolten Wong and Randal Grichuk in the fifth inning which led to his exit. Travis Wood, Trevor Cahill and Héctor Rondón worked 4 1/3 innings of relief.

==== Game 3 ====
Monday, October 12, 2015 4:08 pm CDT at Wrigley Field in Chicago, Illinois
Team	1	2	3	4	5	6	7	8	9	R	H	E
St. Louis	0	0	0	2	0	2	0	0	2	**6**	**8**	**0**
**Chicago**	0	1	0	1	3	2	0	1	0	**8**	**13**	**1**
WP: Jake Arrieta (2–0) LP: Michael Wacha (0–1); Home runs: STL: Jason Heyward (1), Stephen Piscotty (2); CHI: Kyle Schwarber (2), Starlin Castro (1), Kris Bryant (1), Anthony Rizzo (1), Jorge Soler (2), Dexter Fowler (1); Attendance: 42,411

The Cubs got 13 hits to support Jake Arrieta who struck out nine Cardinals over 5-2/3 innings while giving up four runs, the most he had allowed since June 16. Four rookies started for the Cubs and three of them helped to set a Major League playoff team record with six home runs in an 8–6 victory. Six different Cubs players homered – Kyle Schwarber in the second inning, Starlin Castro in the fourth, Kris Bryant and Anthony Rizzo back-to-back in the fifth, Jorge Soler in the sixth, and Dexter Fowler in the eighth inning. Jason Heyward hit a sixth inning homer off Arrieta and Stephen Piscotty hit a two-run ninth inning homer off Héctor Rondón for the Cardinals. The eight total home runs for both teams set a Major League mark for one postseason game. Shortstop Addison Russell left the game in the fourth with left hamstring tightness after sliding head first into third on a triple. Russell would not play the remainder of the postseason.

==== Game 4 ====
Tuesday, October 13, 2015 2:38 pm CDT at Wrigley Field in Chicago, Illinois
Team	1	2	3	4	5	6	7	8	9	R	H	E
St. Louis	2	0	0	0	0	2	0	0	0	**4**	**8**	**0**
**Chicago**	0	4	0	0	0	1	1	0	0	**6**	**8**	**1**
WP: Trevor Cahill (1–0) LP: Kevin Siegrist (0–1) Sv: Héctor Rondón (2); Home runs: STL: Stephen Piscotty (3); CHI: Kyle Schwarber (3), Anthony Rizzo (2), Javier Báez (2), Dexter Fowler (1); Attendance: 42,411

Eight Chicago Cub pitchers allowed eight hits and combined for 15 strikeouts to defeat the St. Louis Cardinals and win a postseason series for the first time ever at Wrigley Field. The score was 2–0 in favor of the Cardinals when the second batter of the game, Stephen Piscotty, hit a two-run homer. In the bottom of the second inning, starting pitcher Jason Hammel drove in Starlin Castro with a sharp single to center and Addison Russell's replacement at shortstop, Javier Báez, followed with a three-run homer to right off Cardinals starter, John Lackey. The Cards rallied and tied the score in the top of the sixth, but the rally ended with a strong throw to catcher Miguel Montero from right fielder Jorge Soler to throw out Tony Cruz at the plate as Cruz attempted to score the lead run from second. Anthony Rizzo hit a go-ahead solo homer off Cardinal reliever Kevin Siegrist in the bottom of the inning on a two out, 0-2 pitch. Kyle Schwarber added an insurance run in the seventh inning, also off Siegrist, with a home run ball that landed on top of the new right field Budweiser scoreboard. Pedro Strop in the eighth and Héctor Rondón in the ninth struck out four of the seven batters they faced to preserve the 6–4 victory.

=== Championship Series ===
==== Game 1 ====
Saturday, October 17, 2015 7:08 pm CDT at Citi Field in New York, New York
Team	1	2	3	4	5	6	7	8	9	R	H	E
Chicago	0	0	0	0	1	0	0	1	0	**2**	**5**	**0**
**New York**	1	0	0	0	1	1	1	0	X	**4**	**8**	**1**
WP: Matt Harvey (2–0) LP: Jon Lester (0–2) Sv: Jeurys Familia (3); Home runs: CHI: Kyle Schwarber (4); NY: Daniel Murphy (4), Travis D'Arnaud (2); Attendance: 44,287

==== Game 2 ====
Sunday, October 18, 2015 7:09 pm CDT at Citi Field in New York, New York
Team	1	2	3	4	5	6	7	8	9	R	H	E
Chicago	0	0	0	0	0	1	0	0	0	**1**	**5**	**0**
**New York**	3	0	1	0	0	0	0	0	X	**4**	**5**	**0**
WP: Noah Syndergaard (1–1) LP: Jake Arrieta (2–1) Sv: Jeurys Familia (4); Home runs: CHI: None; NY: Daniel Murphy (5); Attendance: 44,502

==== Game 3 ====
Tuesday, October 20, 2015 6:07 pm CDT at Wrigley Field in Chicago, Illinois
Team	1	2	3	4	5	6	7	8	9	R	H	E
**New York**	1	0	1	0	0	1	2	0	0	**5**	**11**	**0**
Chicago	1	0	0	1	0	0	0	0	0	**2**	**5**	**1**
WP: Jacob deGrom (3–0) LP: Trevor Cahill (1–1) Sv: Jeurys Familia (5); Home runs: NY: Daniel Murphy (6); CHI: Kyle Schwarber (5), Jorge Soler (3); Attendance: 42,231

For the third game in the series, the Mets scored in the first with a double by Yoenis Céspedes that drove in David Wright off of Cubs starter, Kyle Hendricks. A home run by Kyle Schwarber tied the game in the bottom of the first. In the third, the Mets responded with Daniel Murphy's solo homer, his fifth consecutive postseason game with a home run, to put the Mets up 2–1. Jorge Soler's homer in the fourth again tied the game. The bottom fell out for the Cubs in the sixth when a wild pitch by Trevor Cahill (the losing pitcher) on strike three allowed Yoenis Céspedes to score, putting the Mets up 3–2. A Céspedes single and a sacrifice grounder by Lucas Duda in the seventh drove in Wright and Murphy, for a final score of 5–2 and series deficit of 3–0 for the Cubs.

==== Game 4 ====
Wednesday, October 21, 2015 6:07 pm CDT at Wrigley Field in Chicago, Illinois
Team	1	2	3	4	5	6	7	8	9	R	H	E
**New York**	4	2	0	0	0	0	0	2	0	**8**	**11**	**0**
Chicago	0	0	0	1	0	0	0	2	0	**3**	**6**	**0**
WP: Bartolo Colón (1–0) LP: Jason Hammel (0–1); Home runs: NY: Lucas Duda (1), Travis d'Arnaud (3), Daniel Murphy (7); CHI: Kris Bryant (2); Attendance: 42,227

As in every previous game of the series, the Mets took control of the game in the first inning when first baseman Lucas Duda hit a three-run home run to center field against Cubs starter Jason Hammel. The next batter, catcher Travis d'Arnaud, also hit a home run to make it 4–0. In the second inning, Cubs relief pitcher Travis Wood allowed a two-run double to Duda making it a 6–0 game. Duda's five RBIs tied a Mets record for most in a postseason game. Chicago's first rally came in the fourth when they loaded the bases with no outs for second baseman Starlin Castro. Mets third baseman David Wright made a leaping grab of Castro's line drive to prevent an extra base hit and two runs. However, the Cubs got their first run on an RBI groundout by left fielder Kyle Schwarber. Shortstop Javier Báez popped out in foul territory, stranding two runners and the Cubs were down 6–1. In the fifth inning, after outfielders Dexter Fowler and Jorge Soler reached base, Mets reliever Bartolo Colón struck out third baseman Kris Bryant and the Cubs again stranded two baserunners. In the eighth inning, New York's Daniel Murphy hit a two-run homer, his fourth home run of the series, his seventh of the postseason, and his sixth consecutive game with a home run, a new MLB postseason record. Bryant hit a consolation two-run home run in the bottom of the eighth to put the Mets lead to 8–3. When closer Jeurys Familia struck out Fowler in the ninth, the Mets were back in the World Series for the first time since 2000. The Cubs never had a lead at any point in the four-game series. After hitting .529 with the four home runs and a 1.294 slugging percentage for the series, New York's Daniel Murphy was named series MVP.

=== Postseason rosters ===
Playoff rosters
National League Wild Card Game

- Pitchers: 28 Kyle Hendricks 33 Clayton Richard 34 Jon Lester 37 Travis Wood 46 Pedro Strop 49 Jake Arrieta 52 Justin Grimm 53 Trevor Cahill 56 Héctor Rondón 57 Fernando Rodney
- Catchers: 3 David Ross 47 Miguel Montero
- Infielders: 9 Javier Báez 11 Tommy La Stella 13 Starlin Castro 17 Kris Bryant 22 Addison Russell 44 Anthony Rizzo
- Outfielders: 5 Quintin Berry 8 Chris Coghlan 12 Kyle Schwarber 15 Chris Denorfia 24 Dexter Fowler 27 Austin Jackson 68 Jorge Soler

National League Division Series

- Pitchers: 28 Kyle Hendricks 33 Clayton Richard 34 Jon Lester 37 Travis Wood 39 Jason Hammel 46 Pedro Strop 49 Jake Arrieta 52 Justin Grimm 53 Trevor Cahill 56 Héctor Rondón 57 Fernando Rodney
- Catchers: 3 David Ross 47 Miguel Montero
- Infielders: 9 Javier Báez 11 Tommy La Stella 13 Starlin Castro 17 Kris Bryant 22 Addison Russell 44 Anthony Rizzo
- Outfielders: 8 Chris Coghlan 12 Kyle Schwarber 15 Chris Denorfia 24 Dexter Fowler 27 Austin Jackson 68 Jorge Soler

National League Championship Series

- Pitchers: 28 Kyle Hendricks 33 Clayton Richard 34 Jon Lester 37 Travis Wood 39 Jason Hammel 46 Pedro Strop 49 Jake Arrieta 52 Justin Grimm 53 Trevor Cahill 56 Héctor Rondón 57 Fernando Rodney
- Catchers: 3 David Ross 47 Miguel Montero
- Infielders: 9 Javier Báez 11 Tommy La Stella 13 Starlin Castro 17 Kris Bryant 44 Anthony Rizzo
- Outfielders: 5 Quintin Berry 8 Chris Coghlan 12 Kyle Schwarber 15 Chris Denorfia 24 Dexter Fowler 27 Austin Jackson 68 Jorge Soler

== Regular season statistics ==
=== Batting ===
(Final regular season stats)

Note: G = Games played; AB = At bats; R = Runs; H = Hits; 2B = Doubles; 3B = Triples; HR = Home runs; RBI = Runs batted in; AVG = Batting average; SB = Stolen bases

Player	G	AB	R	H	2B	3B	HR	RBI	AVG	SB
Arismendy Alcántara	11	26	5	2	0	0	0	1	.077	1
Jake Arrieta	30	79	5	12	1	1	2	2	.152	0
Javier Báez	28	76	4	22	6	0	1	4	.289	1
Mike Baxter	34	57	6	14	1	0	0	2	.246	0
Dallas Beeler	3	3	0	1	1	0	0	0	.333	0
Quintin Berry	6	1	0	0	0	0	0	0	.000	0
Kris Bryant	151	559	87	154	31	5	26	99	.275	13
Trevor Cahill	11	2	0	0	0	0	0	0	.000	0
Welington Castillo	24	43	5	7	2	0	2	5	.163	0
Starlin Castro	151	547	52	145	23	2	11	69	.265	5
Chris Coghlan	148	440	64	110	25	6	16	41	.250	11
Chris Denorfia	103	212	18	57	11	1	3	18	.269	0
Carl Edwards Jr.	5	1	0	0	0	0	0	0	.000	0
Dexter Fowler	156	596	102	149	29	8	17	46	.250	20
Justin Grimm	60	1	0	0	0	0	0	0	.000	0
Jason Hammel	31	65	6	11	1	0	0	4	.169	0
Dan Haren	10	15	1	1	0	0	0	1	.067	0
Kyle Hendricks	31	59	2	3	1	0	0	1	.051	0
Jonathan Herrera	73	126	14	29	5	1	2	14	.230	3
Austin Jackson	29	72	10	17	7	0	1	10	.236	2
Tommy La Stella	33	67	4	18	6	0	1	11	.269	2
Junior Lake	21	58	2	13	4	0	1	5	.224	4
Jon Lester	30	62	6	4	0	0	0	0	.065	0
Miguel Montero	113	347	36	86	11	0	15	53	.248	1
Mike Olt	6	15	1	2	0	0	1	1	.133	0
Clayton Richard	22	14	1	2	2	0	0	3	.143	0
Anthony Rizzo	160	586	94	163	38	3	31	101	.278	17
Donn Roach	1	1	0	1	0	0	0	1	1.000	0
David Ross	72	159	6	28	9	0	1	9	.176	1
Addison Russell	142	475	60	115	29	1	13	54	.242	4
James Russell	49	1	0	0	0	0	0	0	.000	0
Kyle Schwarber	69	232	52	57	6	1	16	43	.246	3
Jorge Soler	101	366	39	96	18	1	10	47	.262	3
Matt Szczur	47	72	5	16	5	0	1	8	.222	2
Taylor Teagarden	8	15	0	3	0	0	0	2	.200	0
Tsuyoshi Wada	8	8	1	0	0	0	0	0	.000	0
Travis Wood	58	30	0	3	0	0	0	2	.100	0
Team totals	162	5491	689	1341	272	30	171	657	.244	95

=== Pitching ===
(Final regular season stats)

Note: W = Wins; L = Losses; ERA = Earned run average; G = Games pitched; GS = Games started; SV = Saves; IP = Innings pitched; H = Hits allowed; R = Runs allowed; ER = Earned runs allowed; BB = Walks allowed; K = Strikeouts

Player	W	L	ERA	G	GS	SV	IP	H	R	ER	BB	K
Jake Arrieta	22	6	1.77	33	33	0	229.0	150	52	45	48	236
Dallas Beeler	0	1	9.72	3	3	0	8.1	14	11	9	7	7
Trevor Cahill	1	0	2.12	11	0	0	17.0	8	4	4	5	22
Phil Coke	0	0	6.30	16	0	0	10.0	14	7	7	3	9
Chris Denorfia	0	0	0.00	1	0	0	0.1	0	0	0	0	0
Carl Edwards Jr.	0	0	3.86	5	0	0	4.2	3	3	2	3	4
Gonzalez Germen	0	0	7.50	6	0	0	6.0	8	5	5	5	8
Justin Grimm	3	5	1.99	62	0	3	49.2	31	18	11	26	67
Jason Hammel	10	7	3.74	31	31	0	170.2	158	79	71	40	172
Dan Haren	4	2	4.01	11	11	0	58.1	58	29	26	13	44
Kyle Hendricks	8	7	3.95	32	32	0	180.0	166	82	79	43	167
Tommy Hunter	2	0	5.74	19	0	1	15.2	20	10	10	3	23
Edwin Jackson	2	1	3.19	23	0	0	31.0	30	14	11	12	23
Jon Lester	11	12	3.34	32	32	0	205.0	183	83	76	47	207
Yoervis Medina	0	0	7.00	5	0	0	9.0	12	7	7	4	7
Jason Motte	8	1	3.91	57	0	6	48.1	48	21	21	11	34
Neil Ramirez	1	0	3.21	19	0	0	14.0	12	5	5	6	15
Clayton Richard	4	2	3.83	23	3	0	42.1	47	18	18	7	22
Donn Roach	0	1	10.80	1	1	0	3.1	8	4	4	1	1
Fernando Rodney	2	0	0.75	14	0	0	12.0	8	1	1	4	15
Héctor Rondón	6	4	1.67	72	0	30	70.0	55	19	13	15	69
David Ross	0	0	0.00	2	0	0	2.0	0	0	0	0	0
Zac Rosscup	2	1	4.39	33	0	0	26.2	26	13	13	13	29
James Russell	0	2	5.29	49	0	1	34.0	42	24	20	9	29
Brian Schlitter	1	2	7.36	10	0	0	7.1	12	6	6	2	4
Rafael Soriano	2	0	6.35	6	0	0	5.2	8	4	4	1	4
Pedro Strop	2	6	2.91	76	0	3	68.0	39	24	22	29	81
Tsuyoshi Wada	1	1	3.62	8	7	0	32.1	30	14	13	11	31
Travis Wood	5	4	3.84	54	9	4	100.2	86	48	43	39	118
Team totals	97	65	3.36	162	162	48	1461.1	1276	608	546	407	1431

== Farm system ==
Level	Team	League	Manager
AAA	Iowa Cubs	Pacific Coast League	Marty Pevey
AA	Tennessee Smokies	Southern League	Buddy Bailey
A	Myrtle Beach Pelicans	Carolina League	Mark Johnson
A	South Bend Cubs	Midwest League	Jimmy Gonzalez
A-Short Season	Eugene Emeralds	Northwest League	Pat Murphy
Rookie	AZL Cubs	Arizona League	Ricardo Medina
Rookie	VSL Cubs	Venezuelan Summer League	Pedro Gonzalez
Rookie	DSL Cubs	Dominican Summer League	Juan Cabreja

LEAGUE CHAMPIONS: Myrtle Beach

== In popular culture ==
In the 1989 film Back to the Future Part II, the 2015 Chicago Cubs win the World Series.
