= Tommy La Stella =

American baseball player (born 1989)

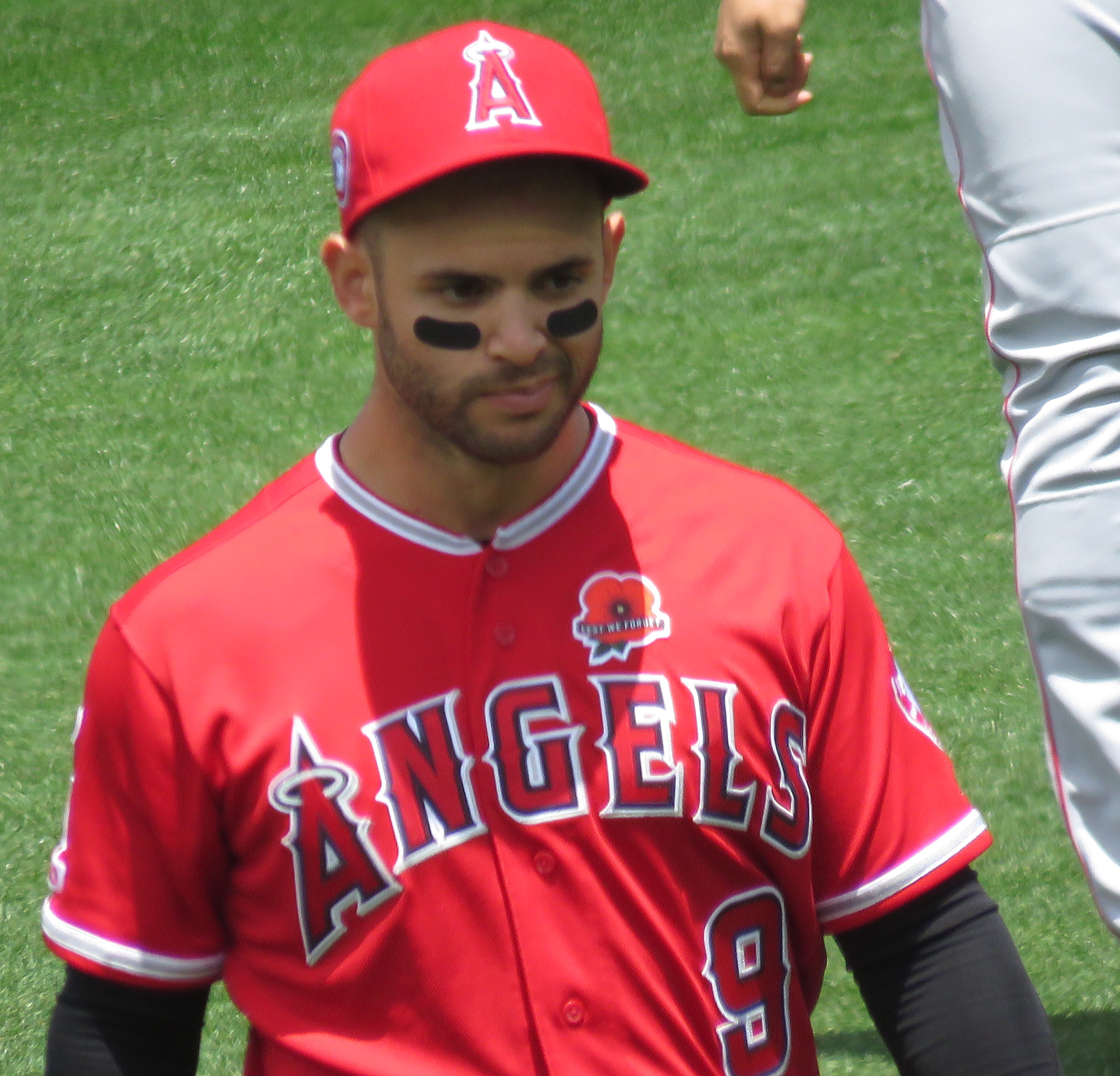
- La Stella with the Los Angeles Angels in 2019
- Second baseman / Third baseman
- Born: January 31, 1989 (age 37); Westwood, New Jersey, U.S.
- Batted: Left Threw: Right

MLB debut
- May 28, 2014, for the Atlanta Braves

Last MLB appearance
- April 30, 2023, for the Seattle Mariners

MLB statistics
- Batting average: .266
- Home runs: 40
- Runs batted in: 206
- Stats at Baseball Reference

Teams
- Atlanta Braves (2014); Chicago Cubs (2015–2018); Los Angeles Angels (2019–2020); Oakland Athletics (2020); San Francisco Giants (2021–2022); Seattle Mariners (2023)

Career highlights and awards
- All-Star (2019); World Series champion (2016)

Thomas Frank La Stella (born January 31, 1989) is an American former professional baseball infielder. He played in Major League Baseball (MLB) for the Atlanta Braves, Chicago Cubs, Los Angeles Angels, Oakland Athletics, San Francisco Giants, and Seattle Mariners.

La Stella played college baseball at St. John's University and Coastal Carolina University. He was selected by the Braves in the eighth round of the 2011 MLB draft, and made his MLB debut with the Braves in 2014. He won the 2016 World Series as a member of the Cubs, and was an All-Star in 2019 with the Angels.

== Early life ==
Thomas Frank La Stella was born in Westwood, New Jersey, to Jane and Phil La Stella. He and his two siblings grew up in nearby Closter, New Jersey. He is of Italian descent. He attended Saint Joseph Regional High School in Montvale, New Jersey. He played baseball in high school, but briefly quit after his junior year, citing burnout.

La Stella enrolled at St. John's University, where he played college baseball for the St. John's Red Storm for one year, before transferring to Coastal Carolina University to play for the Coastal Carolina Chanticleers. La Stella appeared in 125 games (all starts) for the Chanticleers in the 2010 and 2011 seasons and batted .388 with 28 home runs and 136 runs batted in (RBIs). He committed 12 errors in 509 chances for Coastal Carolina, resulting in a .976 fielding percentage. In 2010, he played collegiate summer baseball in the Cape Cod Baseball League for the Bourne Braves.

== Career ==
=== Atlanta Braves (2011–2014) ===
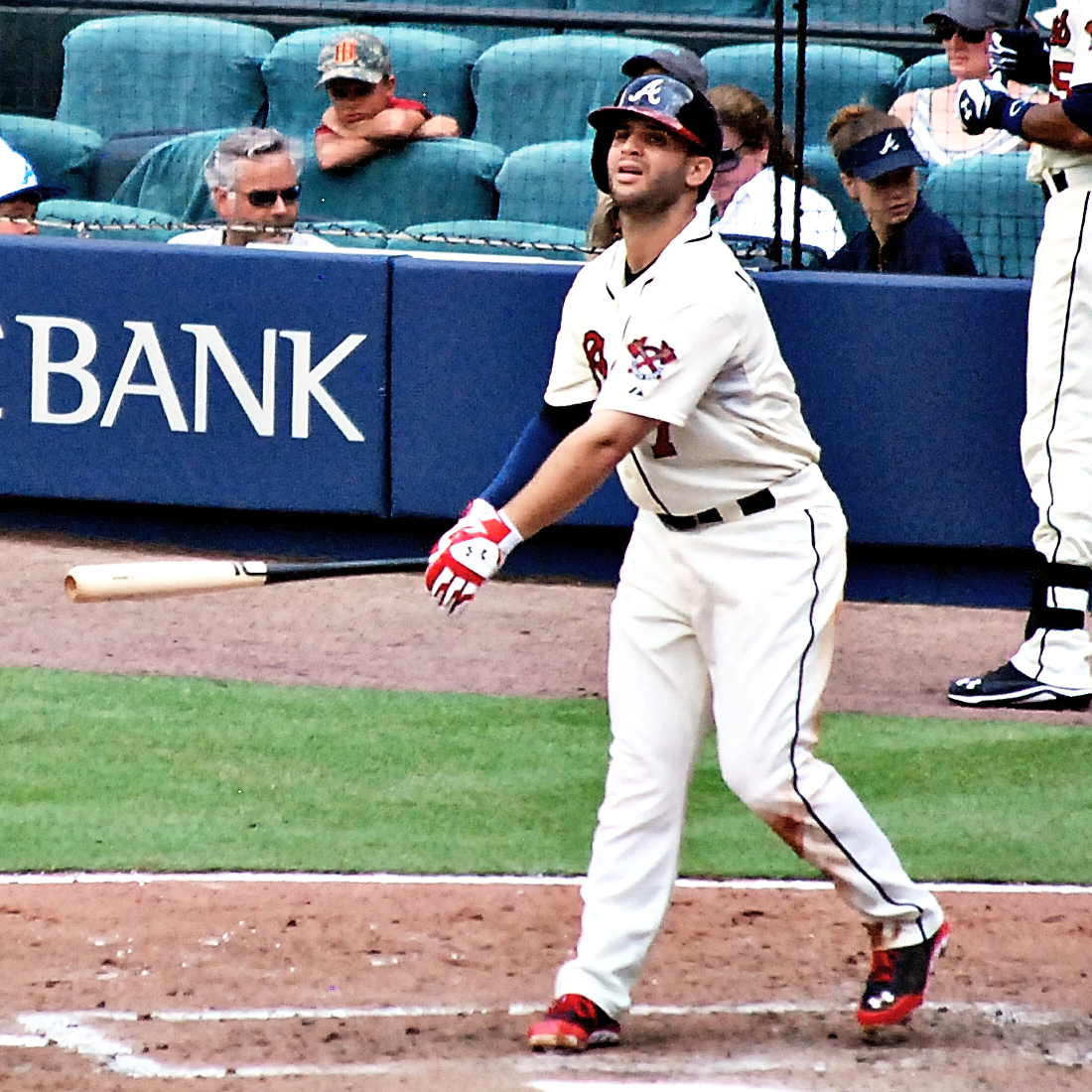
La Stella batting for the Atlanta Braves in 2014

The Atlanta Braves selected La Stella in the eighth round of the 2011 MLB draft. He signed with the Braves for $105,000 and spent the rest of the 2011 season with the Rome Braves of the Class A South Atlantic League. He batted .328/.401/.543 in 232 at bats. He was named an MiLB.com Organization All-Star. La Stella played for the Lynchburg Hillcats of the Class A-Advanced Carolina League in 2012, and he batted .302/.386/.460 in 298 at bats. He was named a Carolina League mid-season All-Star. He was also named an MiLB.com Organization All-Star.

In 2013, La Stella played for the Mississippi Braves of the Class AA Southern League. With Mississippi, La Stella batted .343/.422/.473 in 283 at bats over 81 games. He was named a Topps Double A All-Star. He was also named an MiLB.com Organization All-Star. After the regular season, the Braves assigned La Stella to the Scottsdale Scorpions of the Arizona Fall League (AFL). He was named AFL All-Prospect Team.

The Braves invited La Stella to spring training in 2014. He began the 2014 season with the Gwinnett Braves of the Class AAA International League, and debuted at the major league level on May 28, hitting two singles in his first game. La Stella hit his first major league home run on August 8, 2014, against Stephen Strasburg of the Washington Nationals. He finished the year with a .251 batting average in 93 games.

=== Chicago Cubs (2015–2018) ===
On November 16, 2014, the Braves traded La Stella, along with an international signing bonus slot, to the Chicago Cubs for Arodys Vizcaíno and three international signing bonus slots. La Stella made the Cubs' Opening Day roster, but only played in two games before straining his right oblique on April 10, 2015. While rehabilitating at the minor league level with the Tennessee Smokies, La Stella suffered another oblique strain. He came off the disabled list in August, and was sent to the Iowa Cubs of the Class AAA Pacific Coast League. On August 24, he was recalled from Iowa and rejoined the major league club. In limited time with Chicago, La Stella was used mainly as a pinch hitter, a role in which he excelled. To increase his versatility, La Stella began playing third base during the regular season. In 33 games, La Stella hit .269/.324/.403, and started at third base during the National League (NL) Wild Card Game against the Pittsburgh Pirates.

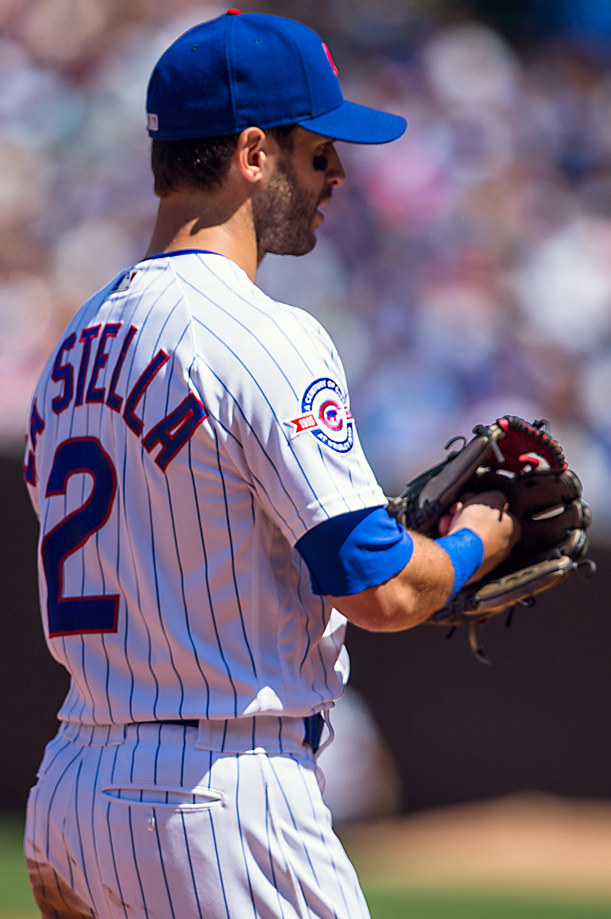
La Stella with the Cubs in 2016

After batting .295 for the Cubs in 2016, the Cubs optioned La Stella to Iowa on July 29, but he did not immediately report. The Cubs put La Stella on the temporarily inactive list. He agreed to report to Tennessee on August 17. Upon being recalled on August 31, La Stella stated that his refusal to report to the minors stemmed mainly from a lack of enjoyment for the game at the time of his demotion. In 74 games of the 2016 season, La Stella finished by batting .270/.357/.405 with two home runs and 11 RBIs. The Cubs won the 2016 World Series. La Stella had one at bat during the 2016 postseason. La Stella was on the roster for the NL Division Series, but was replaced by left-handed pitcher Rob Zastryzny for the NL Championship Series. Kyle Schwarber was selected for the final roster spot for the World Series.

In 2017, La Stella appeared in 73 games for the Cubs. He finished the year batting .288/.389/.472 with 22 RBIs and five home runs.

On July 20, 2018, La Stella pitched an inning and a third as a relief pitcher during a lopsided victory by the St. Louis Cardinals. On August 31, his 21st pinch-hit of the season, a single in the seventh inning in a game against the Philadelphia Phillies, broke the Cub record for pinch hits in a season previously shared by Thad Bosley and Dave Clark. The previous evening, La Stella had tied the record with a two-run go-ahead home run against the Atlanta Braves. For the 2018 season, he batted .266/.340/.331 with one home run and 19 RBIs in 169 at bats.

=== Los Angeles Angels (2019–2020) ===
On November 29, 2018, the Cubs traded La Stella to the Los Angeles Angels for future considerations. With 43 games played into the Angels' 2019 season, La Stella was their regular second baseman and leadoff man with a slash line of .301/.388/.611. He was among the league leaders with 11 home runs and 25 RBIs. La Stella was selected for the MLB All-Star Game, but on July 2, he fractured his tibia on a foul ball. Before the injury, La Stella had been one of the Angel's most productive players. He had a .300 batting average with 16 homers and 44 RBIs in 78 games. He did not return until late September, playing in two of the Angels' final three games.

=== Oakland Athletics (2020) ===
On August 28, 2020, the Angels traded La Stella to the Oakland Athletics for Franklin Barreto.

In 2020 between the two teams, he batted .281/.370/.449 with five home runs and 25 RBIs, and was by a wide margin the toughest AL ballplayer to strike out, averaging 16.3 at bats per strikeout. His strikeouts percentage and whiff percentage were both in the lowest 1% in major league baseball, and on defense his arm strength (73.1 mph) was in the lowest 3%. He also led all AL second basemen in errors, with four.

=== San Francisco Giants (2021–2022) ===
On February 4, 2021, La Stella signed a three-year, $18.75 million contract with the San Francisco Giants; his salary for 2021 is $2 million. On May 18, he was placed on the 60-day injured list with a hamstring strain.

In the 2021 regular season, he batted .250/.308/.405 with 26 runs, 7 home runs, and 20 RBIs in 220 at bats. He played primarily second base, with five games at third base. His arm strength (72.4 mph) was in the weakest 2% in major league baseball.

La Stella had offseason left Achilles surgery in late October, and was expected to recover in four months, in the middle of 2022 spring training. On May 16, 2022, La Stella was activated off the injured list and made his season debut against the Colorado Rockies.

In 2022 he batted .239/.282/.350 in 180 at bats, with two home runs and 14 RBIs. His sprint speed of 24.9 feet per second, the same as the prior year, was in the slowest 10% in baseball. He played 43 games at DH, 13 as a pinch hitter, six at third base, and three each at first base and second base. He was designated for assignment on December 28, 2022. He was placed on release waivers by the Giants on January 5, 2023.

=== Seattle Mariners (2023) ===
On January 19, 2023, La Stella signed a one-year contract with the Seattle Mariners. He played in 12 games for Seattle, hitting .190/.292/.238 with no home runs and 2 RBI. On May 2, La Stella was designated for assignment following the promotion of Bryce Miller. He was released on May 4.
