= 2015 National League Division Series =

American baseball games

Teams
Team (Wins)		Manager	Season
Chicago Cubs (3)		Joe Maddon	97–65 (.599), GB: 3
St. Louis Cardinals (1)		Mike Matheny	100–62 (.617), GA: 2
- Dates: October 9–13
- Television: TBS (US); Sportsnet (Canada)
- TV announcers: Brian Anderson, Dennis Eckersley, Joe Simpson, and Matt Winer
- Radio: ESPN
- Radio announcers: Dan Shulman and Aaron Boone
- Umpires: Dana DeMuth (crew chief), Mark Carlson, Phil Cuzzi, Brian Knight, Bill Welke, Mike Winters

Teams
Team (Wins)		Manager	Season
New York Mets (3)		Terry Collins	90–72 (.556), GA: 7
Los Angeles Dodgers (2)		Don Mattingly	92–70 (.568), GA: 8
- Dates: October 9–15
- Television: TBS (US); Sportsnet (Canada)
- TV announcers: Ernie Johnson, Ron Darling, Cal Ripken Jr., and Sam Ryan
- Radio: ESPN
- Radio announcers: Jon Sciambi and Chris Singleton
- Umpires: Gary Cederstrom (crew chief), Chad Fairchild, Greg Gibson, Chris Guccione, Alan Porter, Jim Wolf
- NLWC: Chicago Cubs defeated Pittsburgh Pirates, 4–0

The 2015 National League Division Series were two best-of-five playoff series on the National League side in Major League Baseball's 2015 postseason to determine the participating teams in the 2015 National League Championship Series. The three divisional winners (seeded 1–3) and a fourth team—the winner of a one-game Wild Card playoff—played in two series. TBS carried all the games in the United States, with Sportsnet simulcasting TBS coverage for Canada. The Division Series began on October 9 and concluded on October 15. The Los Angeles Dodgers and St. Louis Cardinals had home field advantage in this round of the playoffs.

These matchups were:

- (1) St. Louis Cardinals (NL Central champions) vs. (5) Chicago Cubs (Wild Card Game winner): Cubs won the series, 3–1.
- (2) Los Angeles Dodgers (NL West champions) vs. (3) New York Mets (NL East champions): Mets won the series, 3–2.

The higher seeded team in each series hosts Games 1, 2, and 5 (if necessary), and the lower seeded team hosts Games 3 and 4 (if necessary).

The Mets defeated the Cubs in the NLCS, then went on to lose the 2015 World Series to the American League champion Kansas City Royals.

== Matchups ==
=== St. Louis Cardinals vs. Chicago Cubs ===
Chicago won the series, 3–1.

Game	Date	Score	Location	Time	Attendance
1	October 9	Chicago Cubs – 0, St. Louis Cardinals – 4	Busch Stadium	2:47	47,830
2	October 10	Chicago Cubs – 6, St. Louis Cardinals – 3	Busch Stadium	2:57	47,859
3	October 12	St. Louis Cardinals – 6, Chicago Cubs – 8	Wrigley Field	3:28	42,411
4	October 13	St. Louis Cardinals – 4, Chicago Cubs – 6	Wrigley Field	3:16	42,411

=== Los Angeles Dodgers vs. New York Mets ===
New York won the series, 3–2.

Game	Date	Score	Location	Time	Attendance
1	October 9	New York Mets – 3, Los Angeles Dodgers – 1	Dodger Stadium	3:14	54,428
2	October 10	New York Mets – 2, Los Angeles Dodgers – 5	Dodger Stadium	3:24	54,455
3	October 12	Los Angeles Dodgers – 7, New York Mets – 13	Citi Field	3:42	44,276
4	October 13	Los Angeles Dodgers – 3, New York Mets – 1	Citi Field	2:50	44,183
5	October 15	New York Mets – 3, Los Angeles Dodgers – 2	Dodger Stadium	3:13	54,602

== Chicago vs. St. Louis ==
This was the third overall postseason meeting between the Cubs and Cardinals, with the two having met in the 1885 and 1886 World Series, and their first since the Cardinals joined the National League in 1892.

=== Game 1 ===
October 9, 2015 6:45 p.m. (EDT) at Busch Stadium in St. Louis, Missouri 63 °F (17 °C), cloudy
Team	1	2	3	4	5	6	7	8	9	R	H	E
Chicago	0	0	0	0	0	0	0	0	0	0	3	0
St. Louis	1	0	0	0	0	0	0	3	X	4	6	0
WP: John Lackey (1–0) LP: Jon Lester (0–1); Home runs: CHC: None; STL: Tommy Pham (1), Stephen Piscotty (1); Attendance: 47,830; Boxscore

The St. Louis Cardinals shut-out the rival Chicago Cubs 4–0 behind John Lackey's 7 1/3 shutout innings in the first meeting between the two in the playoffs. Lackey pitched into the sixth inning with a no-hitter before the Cubs' Addison Russell singled in the seventh. The Cardinals scored first when Stephen Piscotty hit a ground-rule double, then Matt Holliday hit a RBI single in the first. Lackey and Jon Lester, pitched well as neither team scored again until the eighth inning, when Tommy Pham hit a one-out home run off Lester, who then walked Carpenter before Piscotty's home run increase the Cardinals' lead to 4–0. The Cubs attempted a comeback in the ninth inning off Trevor Rosenthal, but the Cardinals secured the victory when Kris Bryant struck out with runners on first and third for the final out of the game.

=== Game 2 ===
October 10, 2015 5:37 p.m. (EDT) at Busch Stadium in St. Louis, Missouri 70 °F (21 °C), mostly cloudy
Team	1	2	3	4	5	6	7	8	9	R	H	E
Chicago	0	5	1	0	0	0	0	0	0	6	6	0
St. Louis	1	0	0	0	2	0	0	0	0	3	6	2
WP: Travis Wood (1–0) LP: Jaime García (0–1) Sv: Héctor Rondón (1); Home runs: CHC: Jorge Soler (1); STL: Matt Carpenter (1), Kolten Wong (1), Randal Grichuk (1); Attendance: 47,859; Boxscore

In Game 2 Cubs starter Kyle Hendricks allowed a home run to the leadoff batter, third baseman Matt Carpenter in the first, but in the top of the second, with runners on first and third with one out, starter Jaime Garcia's errant throw to first on Hendricks bunt allowed the Cubs to tie the game. Addison Russell's sacrifice bunt and Dexter Fowler's single scored a run each before Jorge Soler's two-run home run made it 5–1 Cubs. They added another run in the third on Miguel Montero's RBI groundout off Lance Lynn with runners on first and third. Hendricks allowed back-to-back shots to Kolten Wong and Randal Grichuk in the fifth inning, but Travis Wood, Trevor Cahill and Hector Rondon worked 4 1/3 innings of shutout relief as the Cubs evened the series with a 6–3 win.

=== Game 3 ===
October 12, 2015 6:07 p.m. (EDT) at Wrigley Field in Chicago, Illinois 75 °F (24 °C), mostly sunny
Team	1	2	3	4	5	6	7	8	9	R	H	E
St. Louis	0	0	0	2	0	2	0	0	2	6	8	0
Chicago	0	1	0	1	3	2	0	1	X	8	13	1
WP: Jake Arrieta (1–0) LP: Michael Wacha (0–1); Home runs: STL: Jason Heyward (1), Stephen Piscotty (2); CHC: Kyle Schwarber (1), Starlin Castro (1), Kris Bryant (1), Anthony Rizzo (1), Jorge Soler (2), Dexter Fowler (1); Attendance: 42,411; Boxscore

Jake Arrieta struck out nine Cardinals over 5 2/3 innings and served up four runs, the most he has allowed since June 16. But, the Cubs set a Major League playoff record with six home runs in an 8–6 victory. Kyle Schwarber's home run in the second off Michael Wacha put the Cubs up 1–0. In the fourth, after back-to-back leadoff walks, Jhonny Peralta's double and Tommy Pham's groundout scored a run each to put the Cardinals up 2–1, but the Cubs tied the score in the bottom half on Starlin Castro's home run. Next inning, Kris Bryant's two-run home run put the Cubs in front 4–2. Kevin Siegrist relieved Wacha and allowed a home run to Anthony Rizzo to extend the Cubs' lead to 5–2. Jason Heyward's two-run home run in the sixth cut the lead to 5–4, but the Cubs got those runs back in the bottom half on Jorge Soler's two-run home run off Adam Wainwright with one run charged to Seth Maness. Dexter Fowler's home run in the eighth off Jonathan Broxton increased the Cubs' lead to 8–4. In the ninth, Hector Rondon allowed a two-out two-run home run to Stephen Piscotty before Matt Holliday grounded out to end the game as the Cubs took a 2–1 series lead. Jason Heyward and Stephen Piscotty hit homers for the Cardinals, and the eight total home runs for both teams set a Major League mark for one postseason game.

=== Game 4 ===
October 13, 2015 4:37 p.m. (EDT) at Wrigley Field in Chicago, Illinois 61 °F (16 °C), partly cloudy
Team	1	2	3	4	5	6	7	8	9	R	H	E
St. Louis	2	0	0	0	0	2	0	0	0	4	8	0
Chicago	0	4	0	0	0	1	1	0	X	6	8	1
WP: Trevor Cahill (1–0) LP: Kevin Siegrist (0–1) Sv: Hector Rondon (2); Home runs: STL: Stephen Piscotty (3); CHC: Javier Báez (1), Anthony Rizzo (2), Kyle Schwarber (2); Attendance: 42,411; Boxscore

Eight Chicago Cubs' pitchers allowed eight hits and combined for 15 strikeouts and four walks to defeat the St. Louis Cardinals and win a postseason series for the first time ever in Wrigley Field. The game did not start well for the Cubs with the second batter, Stephen Piscotty, hitting a two-run home run. In the bottom of the second inning, with two on and two outs versus John Lackey, starting pitcher Jason Hammel drove in Starlin Castro with a sharp single to center and Addison Russell's replacement at shortstop, Javier Baez, followed with a three-run home run to right. The Cardinals tied the score in the sixth on Tony Cruz's double with two on off Trevor Cahill followed by Brandon Moss's single. However, they were prevented from taking the lead by a strong throw by right fielder Jorge Soler to catcher Miguel Montero, cutting down Cruz at the plate as he attempted to score the lead run from second. Anthony Rizzo hit a go-ahead home run off Cardinal reliever Kevin Siegrist in the bottom of the inning on a two-out, 0–2 pitch. Kyle Schwarber added a home run in the seventh inning, also off Siegrist, that landed on top of the new right field Budweiser scoreboard. Pedro Strop in the eighth inning and Hector Rondon in the ninth struck out four of the seven batters they faced to preserve the 6–4 victory.

=== Composite line score ===
2015 NLDS (3–1): Chicago Cubs beat St. Louis Cardinals

Team	1	2	3	4	5	6	7	8	9	R	H	E
Chicago Cubs	0	10	1	1	3	3	1	1	0	20	30	2
St. Louis Cardinals	4	0	0	2	2	4	0	3	2	17	28	2
Total attendance: 180,111 Average attendance: 45,028

== Los Angeles vs. New York ==
This was the third postseason meeting between the Dodgers and Mets, having split the first two meetings (Dodgers won 4–3 in the 1988 NLCS; Mets won 3–0 in the 2006 NLDS).

=== Game 1 ===
October 9, 2015 9:45 p.m. (EDT) at Dodger Stadium in Los Angeles, California 82 °F (28 °C), mostly clear
Team	1	2	3	4	5	6	7	8	9	R	H	E
New York	0	0	0	1	0	0	2	0	0	3	5	0
Los Angeles	0	0	0	0	0	0	0	1	0	1	7	0
WP: Jacob deGrom (1–0) LP: Clayton Kershaw (0–1) Sv: Jeurys Familia (1); Home runs: NYM: Daniel Murphy (1); LAD: None; Attendance: 54,428; Boxscore

Jacob deGrom made his postseason debut to open the series for the Mets. He was opposed by reigning Cy Young Award and Most Valuable Player Award winner Clayton Kershaw. Misplays by left fielder Michael Cuddyer resulted in doubles for Justin Turner in the second and Corey Seager in the third. deGrom escaped damage in both innings and eventually retired the last 11 batters to face him, exiting after the seventh having shut the Dodgers out allowing five hits and one walk to go along with 13 strikeouts. Kershaw made quick work of the Mets for most of his outing, allowing only a home run to Daniel Murphy through his first six innings. However, in the top of seventh, Kershaw uncharacteristically walked three batters, leading to Don Mattingly electing to go to right-hander Pedro Báez to face David Wright with the bases loaded and two out. Wright lined a 3-2 pitch back up the middle against Báez, scoring two runs and making it a 3–0 game to that point. The two runs were charged to Kershaw, who ultimately finished with a line of 6 2/3 innings with four hits, three earned runs, four walks, and 11 strikeouts.

The Dodgers got on the board with a two-out RBI single from Adrián González in the bottom of the eighth off Mets reliever Tyler Clippard. With Turner due up as the potential tying run, Terry Collins responded by inserting closer Jeurys Familia into the game for a 4-out save. Turner lined out to first to end the eighth and Familia finished off a spotless ninth for his first career postseason save as the Mets took the series opener, 3–1.

DeGrom's 13 strikeouts tied a Mets post-season franchise record (previously set by Tom Seaver in Game 1 of the 1973 National League Championship Series). He and Kershaw were the first pair of starters to each pitch 11 or more strikeouts in a post-season game and only the second pair to each have double digit strikeouts (along with Mort Cooper and Denny Galehouse in game five of the 1944 World Series).

=== Game 2 ===
October 10, 2015 9:07 p.m. (EDT) at Dodger Stadium in Los Angeles, California 84 °F (29 °C), clear
Team	1	2	3	4	5	6	7	8	9	R	H	E
New York	0	2	0	0	0	0	0	0	0	2	5	0
Los Angeles	0	0	0	1	0	0	4	0	X	5	7	0
WP: Zack Greinke (1–0) LP: Noah Syndergaard (0–1) Sv: Kenley Jansen (1); Home runs: NYM: Yoenis Céspedes (1), Michael Conforto (1); LAD: None; Attendance: 54,455; Boxscore

Looking to even the series, the Dodgers turned to Zack Greinke, who led the league in earned run average in the regular season. The Mets countered with rookie Noah Syndergaard in an attempt to go back to New York with a 2–0 series lead. The Mets scored two in the second off Greinke on home runs by Yoenis Céspedes and rookie Michael Conforto, the latter doing so in his first career postseason at-bat. Greinke was stellar after that, shutting out the Mets and facing the minimum of 15 batters from the third through seventh innings. He allowed five hits with no walks and eight strikeouts. However, through six innings, Greinke was out-dueled by Syndergaard, who gave up one run through his first six innings while striking out nine.

Syndergaard and the Mets took a 2–1 lead to the bottom of the seventh. L.A.'s eighth-place hitter, Enrique Hernández, drew a one-out walk. Don Mattingly sent up veteran Chase Utley to hit for Greinke. Hernández stole second and Utley followed with a single to put the tying run on third and the go-ahead run at first with one out. Utley's hit chased Syndergaard from the game, manager Terry Collins sending in 42-year-old Bartolo Colón. Howie Kendrick lined a 1-2 pitch over the outstretched arm of Colón but on a hop to second baseman Daniel Murphy, setting up the most controversial play of the game. Murphy tossed to shortstop Rubén Tejada, who was moving to second base to start a potential double play. Utley slid late, with his helmet making contact with Tejada's thigh, who tried to spin and throw to first but was upended and injured. Hernández scored, Kendrick was safe at first, and it appeared a runner would be at first with two outs and the game tied at 2–2. The Dodgers challenged the ruling at second base, arguing that Tejada never made contact with the bag to force out Utley. Just as the Mets were about to cart Tejada off the field with what would later be diagnosed with a fractured fibula, the call at second was overturned to safe. Now with runners on first and second and one out, Collins inserted Addison Reed in relief. After a Corey Seager flyout, the Dodgers took a 5–2 lead on back-to-back doubles from Adrián González and Justin Turner. Dodger relievers Chris Hatcher and Kenley Jansen pitched scoreless eighth and ninth innings, respectively, to even the series at a game apiece.

=== Game 3 ===
October 12, 2015 8:37 p.m. (EDT) at Citi Field in Queens, New York 64 °F (18 °C), mostly clear
Team	1	2	3	4	5	6	7	8	9	R	H	E
Los Angeles	0	3	0	0	0	0	1	0	3	7	13	0
New York	0	4	2	4	0	0	3	0	X	13	13	1
WP: Matt Harvey (1–0) LP: Brett Anderson (0–1); Home runs: LAD: Adrián González (1), Howie Kendrick (1); NYM: Travis d'Arnaud (1), Yoenis Céspedes (2); Attendance: 44,276; Boxscore

In front of a raucous crowd on hand for the first postseason game ever hosted at Citi Field, the Mets took a 2–1 series lead in a rout. The night did not start well for the Mets, as starter Matt Harvey allowed three straight leadoff singles to load the bases in the second before a single by Yasmani Grandal and an error by right fielder Curtis Granderson put the Dodgers up 3–0. Harvey would escape further damage in the frame thanks to a leaping grab by David Wright on a Howie Kendrick line drive to retire the side.

There was concern before Game 3 that the Mets might seek retaliation against the Dodgers for the Chase Utley slide that injured Rubén Tejada in Game 2. Utley appealed a two-game suspension and was eligible to play, but did not. Instead of retaliation, the Mets had a record-setting night offensively. In the bottom of the second, after two leadoff singles off Brett Anderson, Travis d'Arnaud's RBI single scored a run, then Wilmer Flores's single loaded the bases before Granderson atoned for his error with a two-out bases-clearing double to give the Mets a 4–3 lead. Travis d'Arnaud's two-run home run off Anderson in the third extended the Mets' lead to 6–3. In the fourth, with two on against Alex Wood, Daniel Murphy drove in Juan Lagares with a single before Yoenis Céspedes's three-run home run made it 10–3 Mets. Adrián González hit a home run in the seventh off Bartolo Colón for the Dodgers, but in the bottom half, Pedro Baez allowed a leadoff single and two walks to load the bases. J.P. Howell in relief allowed a sacrifice fly to Michael Conforto and two-run double to Granderson. In the ninth, Erik Goeddel allowed two leadoff singles before Howie Kendrick's three-run home run made it 13–7 Mets. After a single, Jeurys Familia relieved Goeddel and retired the next three batters to end the game as the Mets took a 2–1 series lead. The 13 runs scored by the Mets set a new franchise record for a postseason game. Granderson's five RBIs tied a Mets single-game postseason record.

=== Game 4 ===
October 13, 2015 8:07 p.m. (EDT) at Citi Field in Queens, New York 69 °F (21 °C), mostly cloudy
Team	1	2	3	4	5	6	7	8	9	R	H	E
Los Angeles	0	0	3	0	0	0	0	0	0	3	7	0
New York	0	0	0	1	0	0	0	0	0	1	3	0
WP: Clayton Kershaw (1−1) LP: Steven Matz (0−1) Sv: Kenley Jansen (2); Home runs: LAD: None; NYM: Daniel Murphy (2); Attendance: 44,183

In a must-win Game 4, the Dodgers turned to their ace Clayton Kershaw on three days rest to try to send the series back to Los Angeles. A win for the Mets would mean their first trip to the NLCS in nine years. They turned to the second rookie member of their starting rotation, Steven Matz. The pitchers traded zeroes for two innings before the top of the third. Kershaw himself had a one-out single to get a rally started. Although he was erased on a fielder's choice, the Dodgers followed with three consecutive hits: singles by Howie Kendrick and Adrián González, the latter of which scored the first run, and a two-run double by Justin Turner, giving the Dodgers the 3–0 edge.

Though Daniel Murphy connected in the fourth inning for his second home run off the Dodgers ace in the series, Kershaw would allow nothing more. He went seven innings, allowing only three hits and a walk to go with eight strikeouts, outdueling the rookie Matz, who only lasted five innings. Though the Mets drew two walks in the eighth inning, putting the tying runs on base and the potential go-ahead run at the plate, Dodgers closer Kenley Jansen induced a Murphy flyout to retire the side before retiring the Mets in order in the ninth for a 4-out save.

The win for the Dodgers snapped a seven-game road playoff losing streak. It was also the first time the Dodgers won an elimination game on the road since the 1981 NLCS against the Montreal Expos.

=== Game 5 ===
October 15, 2015 8:07 p.m. (EDT) at Dodger Stadium in Los Angeles, California 74 °F (23 °C), mostly clear
Team	1	2	3	4	5	6	7	8	9	R	H	E
New York	1	0	0	1	0	1	0	0	0	3	7	1
Los Angeles	2	0	0	0	0	0	0	0	0	2	6	1
WP: Jacob deGrom (2–0) LP: Zack Greinke (1–1) Sv: Jeurys Familia (2); Home runs: NYM: Daniel Murphy (3); LAD: None; Attendance: 54,602; Boxscore

The rubber game of the 5-game series was started by Zack Greinke for the Dodgers and Jacob deGrom for the Mets. The game's first play went for an infield single for Curtis Granderson, who was initially called out prior to a challenge by Mets manager Terry Collins. Two batters later, Granderson was driven in by a Daniel Murphy double. Murphy reached third after an error by left fielder Enrique Hernández, but was stranded there after Greinke struck out Yoenis Céspedes and Lucas Duda.

The Dodgers immediately answered in the bottom half of the inning. After Howie Kendrick lined out, the Dodgers put together four consecutive singles against deGrom, who was not showing the same sharpness of his Game 1 victory. The Dodgers scored two runs and were still threatening with runners on first second, but deGrom struck out Yasmani Grandal and Hernández to end the threat. deGrom would pitch in and out of trouble, dealing with runners in scoring position through each of the first five innings. Justin Turner continued his domination of his former team with three hits off deGrom, including a double to lead off the bottom of the third. Turner stole third with one out, but deGrom escaped unscathed after fielding a comebacker from Hernández to start a 1–6–3 double play to end the inning.

deGrom's multiple escapes afforded the Mets the opportunity to get back into the game, with Murphy stealing a run for the Mets in the top of the fourth. After singling, Murphy advanced to second after a Duda walk. As the infield had shifted for Duda, the Dodger third baseman Turner was in shallow right field. The infielder furthest to the left for the Dodgers was the shortstop Corey Seager, who was just to the left of second base. Murphy, noticing third base uncovered, trotted to second base, then rounded the bag and sprinted to third unchallenged for a stolen base. Travis d'Arnaud followed with a sacrifice fly to right to drive in Murphy and tie the game at 2–2. Murphy came through again in the sixth inning with a home run off Greinke, his third homer of the series.

The Mets were back in front 3–2 and never trailed thereafter. deGrom finished off a 1–2–3 sixth before giving way to Game 2 starter Noah Syndergaard, who featured 100 mph fastballs in a scoreless seventh inning, allowing only one walk. The Mets turned to closer Jeurys Familia for a two-inning save, something he had never been asked to do previously in his career and not been done in the postseason by any Mets pitcher since Jesse Orosco saved Game 7 of the 1986 World Series. Familia set down all six batters, sending the Mets to the NLCS for the first time since 2006.

Turner finished the series hitting a scintillating .526 with six doubles. The six doubles were the most in Division Series history and tied a record for most doubles in any one postseason series. Familia finished the series having retired all 16 batters to face him while the Mets captured their first win in a deciding game of a postseason series since the aforementioned Game 7 of the 1986 World Series.

After the series loss, the Dodgers and Don Mattingly mutually parted ways. Mattingly went on the manage the Miami Marlins the following season, while the Dodgers hired former player and San Diego Padres bench coach Dave Roberts.

=== Composite line score ===
2015 NLDS (3–2): New York Mets beat Los Angeles Dodgers

Team	1	2	3	4	5	6	7	8	9	R	H	E
New York Mets	1	6	2	7	0	1	5	0	0	22	33	2
Los Angeles Dodgers	2	3	3	1	0	0	5	1	3	18	40	1
Total attendance: 251,944 Average attendance: 50,389

== See also ==
- 2015 American League Division Series
