= Stephen Piscotty =

American baseball player (born 1991)

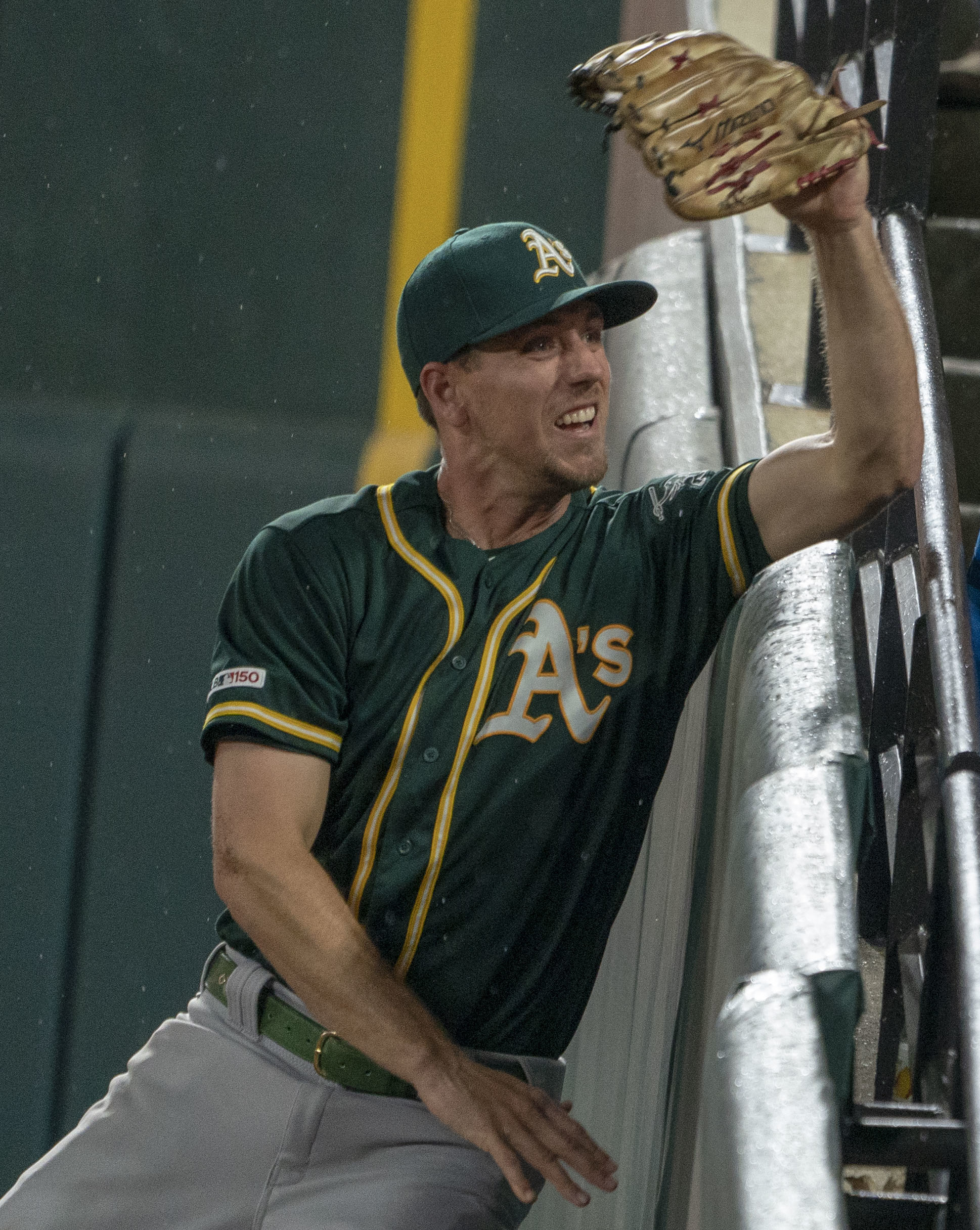
- Piscotty with the Oakland Athletics in 2019
- Right fielder
- Born: January 14, 1991 (age 35); Pleasanton, California, U.S.
- Batted: Right Threw: Right

MLB debut
- July 21, 2015, for the St. Louis Cardinals

Last MLB appearance
- August 14, 2022, for the Oakland Athletics

MLB statistics
- Batting average: .255
- Home runs: 93
- Runs batted in: 354
- Stats at Baseball Reference

Teams
- St. Louis Cardinals (2015–2017); Oakland Athletics (2018–2022)

Stephen Edward Piscotty (born January 14, 1991) is an American former professional baseball right fielder. He played in Major League Baseball (MLB) for the St. Louis Cardinals and Oakland Athletics from 2015 to 2022.

Piscotty played college baseball for Stanford and was the Cardinals' first-round selection in the 2012 MLB draft. He made his major league debut on July 21, 2015, and was the Cardinals' organization Player of the Year that season. The Cardinals traded Piscotty to the Athletics after the 2017 season.

== Early life and amateur career ==
Stephen Piscotty is the eldest of three sons of Michael and Gretchen Piscotty. He has two younger brothers, named Austin and Nicholas. Born in Pleasanton, California, he began attending college baseball games of the Stanford Cardinal of Stanford University with his uncle for his birthday when he was young. He grew up a fan of the Oakland Athletics. Piscotty attended Amador Valley High School in Pleasanton, where he played for the school's baseball team as a pitcher and a shortstop. In 2009, his senior year, he was named the most valuable player of the East Bay Athletic League.

The Los Angeles Dodgers selected Piscotty in the 45th round of the 2009 Major League Baseball draft but he opted not to sign. He enrolled at Stanford to play college baseball for the Cardinal as a third baseman, pitcher, and an outfielder. In 2011, Piscotty was named to the All-Pacific-10 Conference first team. Piscotty also played collegiate summer baseball for the Yarmouth-Dennis Red Sox in 2011 and was the Cape Cod League batting champion with a .349 batting average.

Piscotty was named a preseason All-American prior to the 2012 season. That year, he batted .329, led the Cardinal with 30 walks and 56 runs batted in (RBIs) (along with hitting five home runs), and was named All-Pac-12 in 2012. As a pitcher, Piscotty posted a 5–2 won–lost record with a 2.57 earned run average in 2012. During his Stanford career, he batted .340 with 124 runs, 132 RBIs, 43 doubles, 12 home runs and 62 walks in 172 games.

== Professional career ==
=== St. Louis Cardinals ===
The St. Louis Cardinals selected Piscotty in the first round, with the 36th overall selection, of the 2012 Major League Baseball draft and signed him on June 16 with a $1.4 million bonus. After playing in the infield for the Quad Cities River Bandits of the Single–A Midwest League in 2012, the Cardinals moved him to the outfield before the 2013 season. His first season showed mixed results as he batted .295 with a .376 on-base percentage, .448 slugging percentage, four home runs, 18 doubles and 27 RBIs, but committed 22 errors in just 36 games at third base. The Cardinals assigned Piscotty to the Palm Beach Cardinals of the High–A Florida State League (FSL) in 2013, where he was selected as an All-Star.

After batting .295 with 15 home runs in 112 games for Palm Beach and the Springfield Cardinals of the Double–A Texas League in 2013, the Cardinals assigned Piscotty to the Arizona Fall League (AFL) to play for the Salt River Rafters. Piscotty spent the 2014 season with the Memphis Redbirds of the Triple–A Pacific Coast League, and opened the 2015 season with Memphis. There, he batted .272 with an .841 OPS in 87 games for the Redbirds.

==== 2015 ====
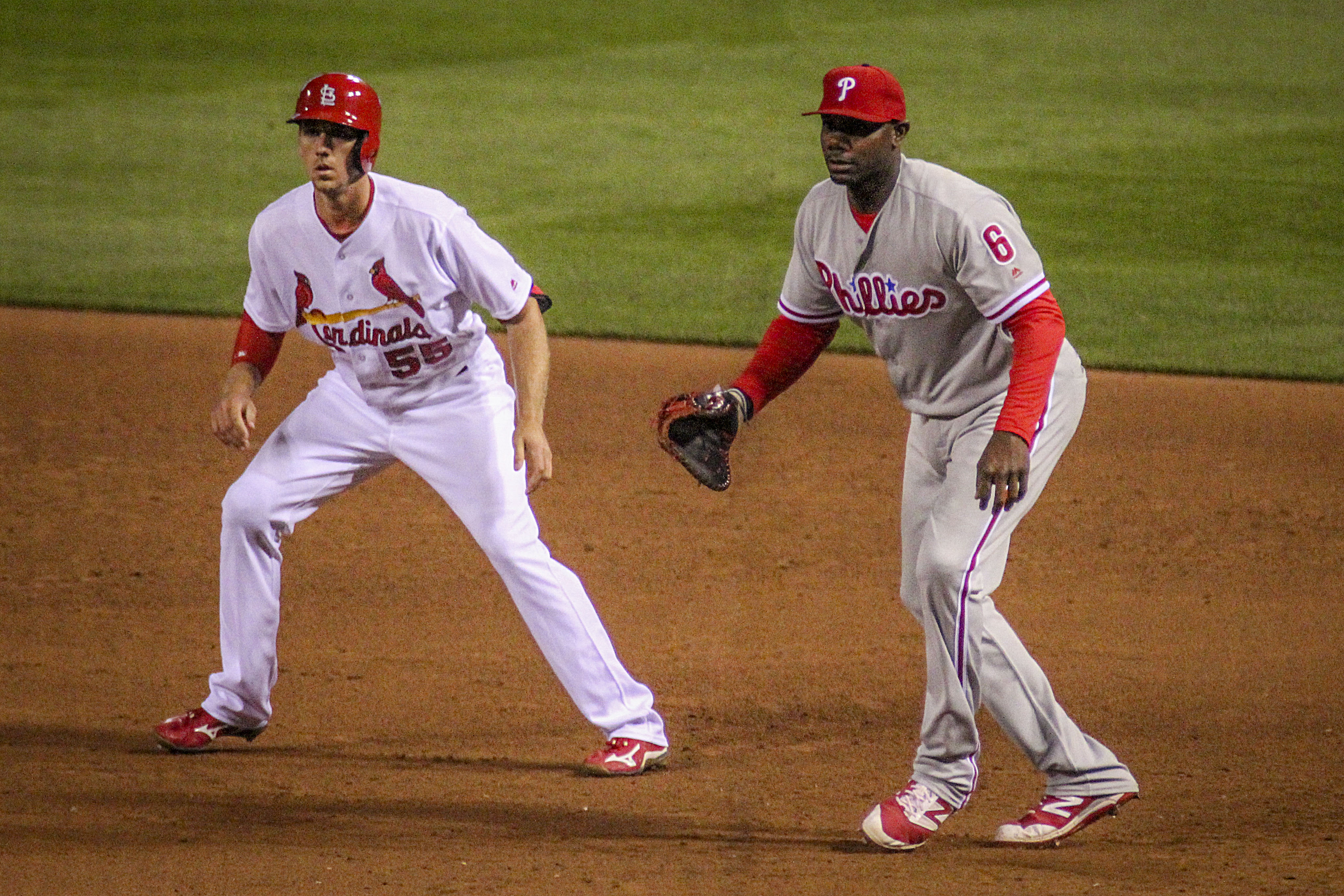
First baseman Ryan Howard (right) of the Philadelphia Phillies holding Piscotty on first base in a game in 2016

The St. Louis Cardinals promoted Piscotty to their major league roster on July 21, 2015. He made his major league debut that night as the starting left fielder against the Chicago White Sox in an 8–5 win, and singled off Carlos Rodón in his second at-bat for his first hit. His sacrifice fly scored Peter Kozma on July 25 and was the only run of the game and game-winner in a 1–0 win over the Atlanta Braves for his first RBI. His first home run came at Busch Stadium on August 16 in a 6–4 loss to the Miami Marlins, and he hit his first triple the next day in a 2–1 win over the San Francisco Giants. Piscotty set a career-high five RBI on August 23 against the San Diego Padres at Petco Park, including his first career multi-home run game, while adding a triple. The first four-hit game of Piscotty's professional, and major league, career was in 6–0 win over the Giants at AT&T Park on August 29.

While playing the Pittsburgh Pirates on September 28, Piscotty was injured on a fly ball into left field when he collided with Peter Bourjos' knee, which hit him in the head. He suffered a bruise, but tests results were negative for injury, including concussion. His regular season totals in the major leagues included a .305 batting average, .359 on-base percentage, .494 slugging percentage, seven home runs and 39 RBI. Ready for game action in time for the playoffs, Piscotty's first playoff appearance was in the National League Division Series (NLDS) against the Chicago Cubs. There, he hit both his first career postseason home run and double in a 4–0 win. The Cardinals lost the NLDS in four games, but Piscotty batted .375 and slugged 1.000, and hit three home runs and six RBI in four games. He tied for sixth in the National League Rookie of the Year Award voting, and was the franchise's Minor League Player of the Year for 2015. He lost to the winner of the National League Rookie of the Year Award to Cubs' third baseman Kris Bryant.

==== 2016 ====
After spring training of 2016, Piscotty won the role of starting right fielder for the Cardinals. While facing Max Scherzer of the Washington Nationals on May 27, Piscotty hit his first career grand slam in a 6–2 win. Piscotty finished his first full season in the majors batting .273 with 22 home runs and 85 RBI's. Piscotty also finished the season batting .363 with runners in scoring position.

==== 2017 ====
Then 26, he signed a six-year extension for a reported $33.75 million ($5.625 mil. average), with a $15 million option for 2023 on April 3. Piscotty was not yet arbitration-eligible, and his first year of free-agent eligibility was to be 2022. Five years prior, the Cardinals plucked Piscotty out of Stanford University with one of the two picks they netted as compensation for Albert Pujols' departure. Since making his big league debut, Piscotty had posted a .282/.349/.467 slash line and an .816 OPS. In 2016, Piscotty led the Cards in games played (153), runs scored (86), RBIs (85) and game-winning RBIs (10).

On April 4, he received the rare distinction of getting hit by a ball three times in one trip around the bases. At bat, he was hit by a pitch near the right elbow. Piscotty then hustled to second on a wild pitch, only to be struck on the left elbow by the catcher's throw. A few pitches later, he tried to score from second after a bobbled-ball error in the infield. The second baseman's throw hit him in the left side of his helmet as he slid in safely at home plate. He was subject to concussion tests before he could return to action and was diagnosed with a head contusion. Starting pitcher and teammate Adam Wainwright said afterwards, "Probably the roughest turn around the bases I've ever seen." He passed the concussion protocol on April 5, clearing him to play. He said he was more sore around his right elbow where he was hit by the pitch to start the unusual sequence of getting hit three times in one inning.

He took personal leave on May 26. After returning from personal leave, Piscotty was placed on the DL once again and missed 16 games. Piscotty returned from the DL, and was subsequently optioned to Triple-A Memphis due to his underachieving year, with a .232 batting average.

=== Oakland Athletics (2018–2022) ===
On December 14, 2017, the Cardinals traded Piscotty to the Oakland Athletics in exchange for Yairo Muñoz and Max Schrock. The trade came at the request of Piscotty who wished to be closer to his mother, Gretchen, who was battling amyotrophic lateral sclerosis (ALS). Gretchen died on May 6, 2018.

On May 15, 2018, in his first at-bat back after returning from bereavement leave following the death of his mother, Piscotty hit a home run. Piscotty hit 27 home runs and drove in 88 runs in his first year with the A's, both career highs. Following the season, he won the Tony Conigliaro Award.

On June 29, 2019, Piscotty sprained his knee trying to slide into second base in a game at the Los Angeles Angels. The injury limited him to 93 games in the 2019 season where he batted .249 with 13 home runs and 44 RBI.{https://www.baseball-almanac.com/players/player.php?p=piscost01} Piscotty hit two grand slams in 2020, the first of which gave the Athletics a 5–1 walk off win against the Texas Rangers on August 4. The second was hit 10 days later against the San Francisco Giants to tie the game in the ninth inning, which the A's began trailing 7–2. It was the first grand slam hit at Oracle Park in the ninth inning or later, as well as the 50th grand slam at that venue. He finished the season hitting .226 with 5 home runs and 29 RBI.

On August 27, 2021, Piscotty underwent season-ending surgery on a lingering wrist injury. In 72 games for Oakland, Piscotty slashed .220/.282/.353 with 5 home runs and 16 RBI.{https://www.baseball-almanac.com/players/player.php?p=piscost01} The Athletics released Piscotty on August 16, 2022; prior to his release, he had batted .190/.252/.341 with five home runs and 14 RBIs in 42 games. He also had the slowest sprint speed of any major league right fielder, at 25.0 feet/second.

=== Cincinnati Reds ===
On August 23, 2022, Piscotty signed a minor league contract with the Cincinnati Reds. He played in 24 games for the Triple-A Louisville Bats down the stretch, slashing .250/.313/.455 with five home runs and 14 RBI. Piscotty elected free agency following the season on November 10.

=== San Francisco Giants ===
On February 6, 2023, Piscotty signed a minor league contract with the San Francisco Giants organization. On March 30, after not making the Opening Day roster, Piscotty requested and was granted his release by San Francisco.

=== Chicago White Sox ===
On April 22, 2023, Piscotty signed a minor league contract with the Chicago White Sox. In 51 games for the Triple–A Charlotte Knights, he batted .232/.330/.390 with 6 home runs and 32 RBI. On August 9, Piscotty was released by the White Sox organization.

=== Oakland Athletics (second stint) ===
On February 3, 2024, Piscotty signed a minor league deal with the Oakland Athletics, which included an invitation to spring training. In 31 games for the Triple–A Las Vegas Aviators, he batted .176/.246/.241 with one home run and nine RBI. On June 1, Piscotty was released by the Athletics organization.

== Coaching career ==
On February 6, 2026, Piscotty was announced as a roving coach within the player development department in the Athletics organization.

== Skills profile ==
With a short, compact swing, Piscotty consistently hits to the gaps. In the FSL, which is considered a pitcher-friendly league, he hit .292 with a .477 slugging percentage in 63 games. As of September 2013, he is thought to have a hit tool and approach that should help him get to the Major Leagues, but scouts are unsure if he will develop the type of power that is associated with corner outfield positions. He is rated to have a smooth swing and a strong arm. As a pitcher, he has been clocked up to 93 miles per hour (150 km/h).

== Achievements and awards ==
Minor leagues

- Florida State League All-Star, 2013
- The Cardinal Nation/Scout.com 2013 Top Prospect #12
- St. Louis Cardinals Minor League Player of the Year, 2015

College

- Third-Team All-American (Utility player), 2012
- First-team All-Pac-10: 2011, 2012

High school

- Most Valuable Player, East Bay Athletic League, 2009
- Rawlings California All-Region First Team, 2009
- All-East Bay Athletic League, 2006, 2007, and 2009

== Personal life ==
At Stanford, Piscotty majored in atmospheric and energy engineering. He completed his bachelor's degree during the 2014–15 off-season. Piscotty's younger brother Austin played college baseball at Saint Mary's College of California and was drafted by the Oakland Athletics in the 38th round of the 2018 MLB draft.

Piscotty and his wife, Carrie, married in 2019. They reside in Danville, California. They welcomed their first child, a son, in April 2021.

Piscotty owned a $1.4 million home in Creve Coeur, Missouri while playing for the Cardinals, but sold it after being traded.

== See also ==
- St. Louis Cardinals all-time roster
