= 2015 National League Wild Card Game =

	1	2	3	4	5	6	7	8	9	R	H	E
Chicago Cubs	1	0	2	0	1	0	0	0	0	4	7	1
Pittsburgh Pirates	0	0	0	0	0	0	0	0	0	0	5	1
- Date: October 7, 2015
- Venue: PNC Park
- City: Pittsburgh, Pennsylvania
- Managers: Joe Maddon (Chicago Cubs); Clint Hurdle (Pittsburgh Pirates)
- Umpires: John Hirshbeck (crew chief), Cory Blaser, Mike Estabrook, Jeff Nelson, Jim Reynolds, Hunter Wendelstedt, Dan Iassogna (replay), Mark Wegner (replay)
- Attendance: 40,889
- Television: TBS
- TV announcers: Ernie Johnson Jr., Ron Darling, Cal Ripken Jr., and Matt Winer
- Radio: ESPN
- Radio announcers: Jon Sciambi and Chris Singleton

The 2015 National League Wild Card Game was a play-in game during Major League Baseball's (MLB) 2015 postseason played between the National League's (NL) two wild card teams, the Chicago Cubs and the Pittsburgh Pirates. In MLB at that time, the two teams with the best record in each league who did not win a division played against each other in the Wild Card Game.

The game was held at Pittsburgh's PNC Park on October 7, 2015. This was the third consecutive year that the NL Wild Card Game was played in Pittsburgh. This was the third consecutive postseason appearance for the Pirates, all of which came as a wild card qualifier, while the Cubs made the postseason for the first time since 2008. This was the first postseason meeting between the Cubs and the Pirates.

The Pirates and Cubs had finished with the second and third-best records in all of baseball during the 2015 season, with 98 and 97 wins respectively. However, since they were in the same division as the 100-win St. Louis Cardinals, they were slotted into the wild card game.

The Cubs won the game 4–0, and advanced to play the Cardinals in the NL Division Series. This is the Pirates' last postseason appearance to date.

== Game results ==
=== Line score ===
October 7, 2015 8:08 pm (EDT) at PNC Park, Pittsburgh, Pennsylvania, 68 °F (20 °C), clear
Team	1	2	3	4	5	6	7	8	9	R	H	E
Chicago	1	0	2	0	1	0	0	0	0	4	7	1
Pittsburgh	0	0	0	0	0	0	0	0	0	0	5	1
WP: Jake Arrieta (1–0) LP: Gerrit Cole (0–1); Home runs: CHC: Kyle Schwarber (1), Dexter Fowler (1); PIT: None; Attendance: 40,889; Boxscore

The starting pitcher for the Pittsburgh Pirates was Gerrit Cole and the starter for the Chicago Cubs was Jake Arrieta. Kyle Schwarber drove in the games' first run with an RBI single in the top of the 1st to give the Cubs a 1–0 lead. In the top of the 3rd, Schwarber hit a two-run home run to right field that went into the Allegheny River to give the Cubs a 3–0 lead. In the top of the 5th, Cole allowed another Home Run to Dexter Fowler to make it 4–0. Cole was pulled after 5 innings, giving up 4 runs and striking out only 4 batters. In the bottom of the 5th, Arrieta hit Pirates catcher Francisco Cervelli on a 1–0 count. An inning later, Arrieta hit another Pirate that being Josh Harrison which caused a lot of anger from the Pirates dugout. In the bottom of the 7th, Arrieta was hit by Pirates pitcher Tony Watson on the first pitch which caused the benches to clear. Arrieta went the whole 9 innings giving up 5 hits and struck out 11 batters as the Cubs won the game 4–0 to advance to the NLDS.
