= Donn Roach =

American baseball player (born 1989)

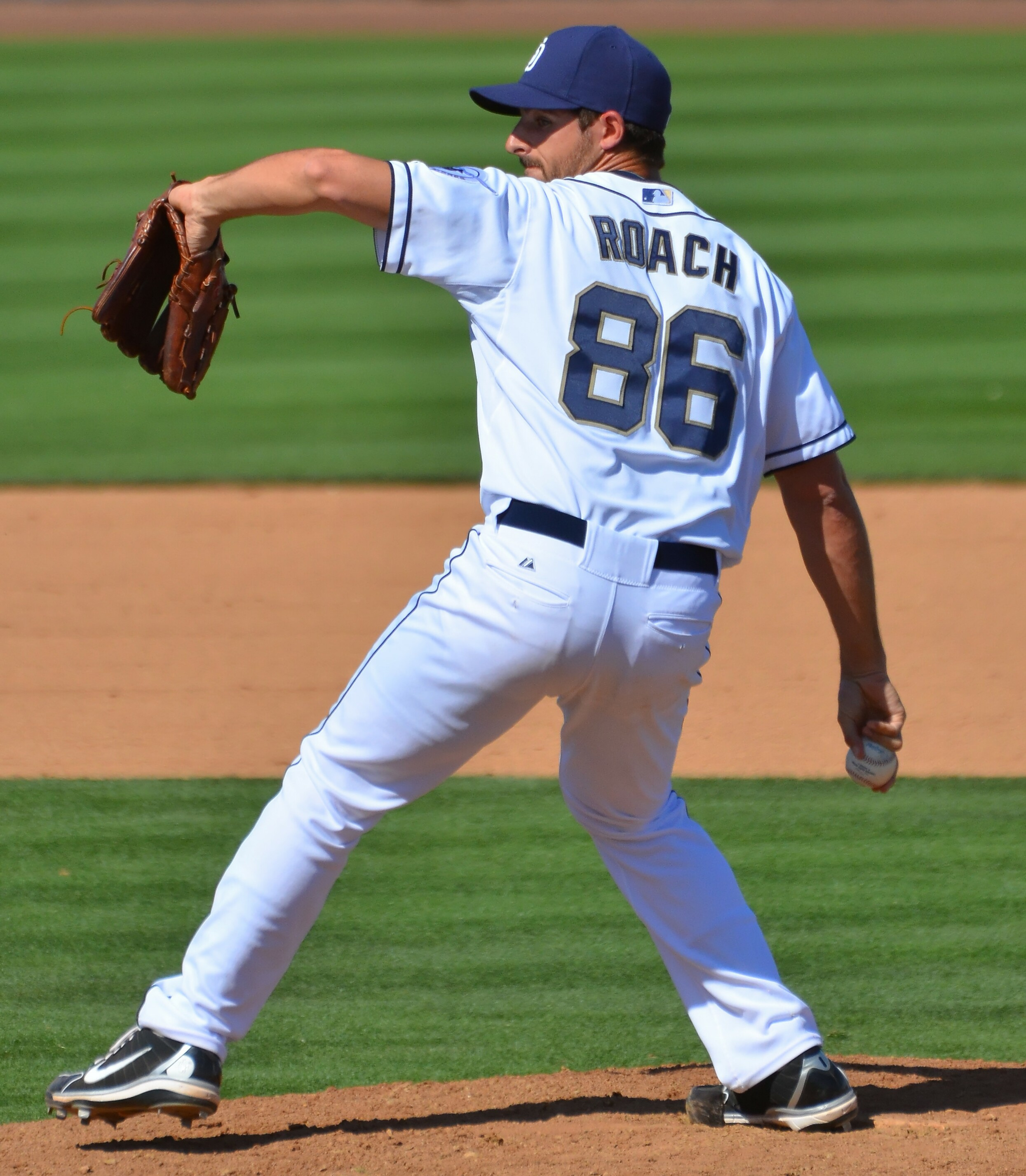
- Roach pitching for the San Diego Padres in 2013
- Pitcher
- Born: December 14, 1989 (age 36); Las Vegas, Nevada, U.S.
- Batted: Right Threw: Right

Professional debut
- MLB: April 2, 2014, for the San Diego Padres
- KBO: March 31, 2017, for the KT Wiz
- NPB: July 22, 2018, for the Orix Buffaloes
- CPBL: April 16, 2020, for the Uni-President Lions

Last appearance
- MLB: August 2, 2016, for the Seattle Mariners
- KBO: October 1, 2017, for the KT Wiz
- NPB: September 25, 2018, for the Orix Buffaloes
- CPBL: May 12, 2020, for the Uni-President Lions

MLB statistics
- Win–loss record: 3–1
- Earned run average: 5.77
- Strikeouts: 20

KBO statistics
- Win–loss record: 4–15
- Earned run average: 4.69
- Strikeouts: 99

NPB statistics
- Win–loss record: 2–3
- Earned run average: 5.01
- Strikeouts: 19

CPBL statistics
- Win–loss record: 1–4
- Earned run average: 11.35
- Strikeouts: 12
- Stats at Baseball Reference

Teams
- San Diego Padres (2014); Chicago Cubs (2015); Seattle Mariners (2016); KT Wiz (2017); Orix Buffaloes (2018); Uni-President Lions (2020)

Donn Mitchell Roach (born December 14, 1989) is an American former professional baseball pitcher. He made his Major League Baseball (MLB) debut in 2014 with the San Diego Padres, and played in MLB for the Chicago Cubs and Seattle Mariners. Roach also played in the KBO League for the KT Wiz, in Nippon Professional Baseball (NPB) the Orix Buffaloes, and in the Chinese Professional Baseball League (CPBL) for the Uni-President Lions.

== Career ==
=== Los Angeles Angels ===
Roach graduated from Bishop Gorman High School in Summerlin, Nevada in 2008. The Los Angeles Angels of Anaheim selected Roach in the 40th round of the 2008 Major League Baseball draft. He did not sign, and attended the University of Arizona, where he played college baseball for the Arizona Wildcats. After one year at Arizona, Roach transferred to the College of Southern Nevada, a junior college, to play for the Southern Nevada Coyotes. He was then drafted again by the Angels, in the third round of the 2010 Major League Baseball draft. Roach chose to sign with the Angels.

=== San Diego Padres ===
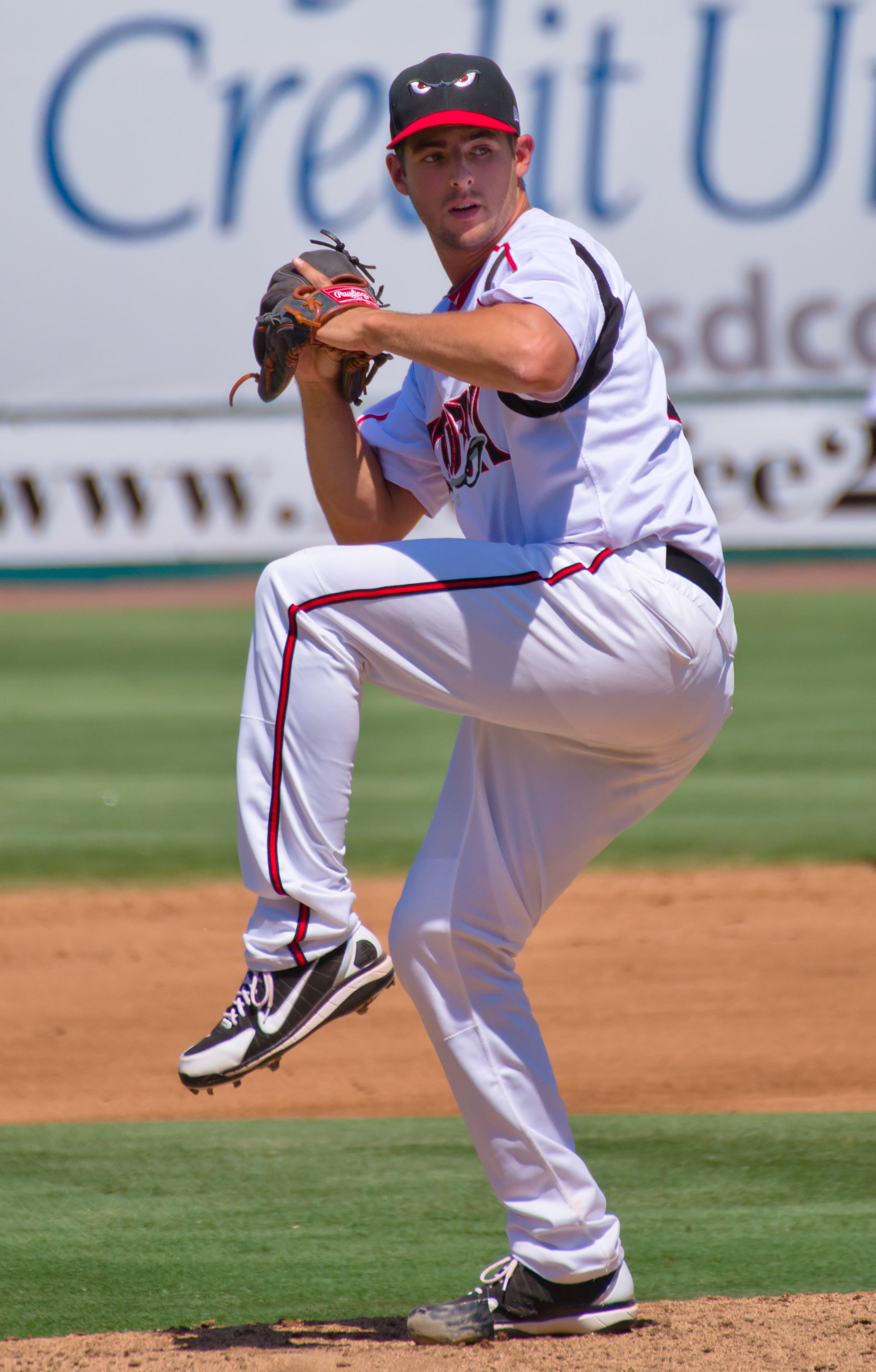
Roach pitching for the Lake Elsinore Storm in 2012

On May 4, 2012, the Angels traded Roach and Alexi Amarista to the San Diego Padres for Ernesto Frieri. He was added to the Padres' 40-man roster after the 2013 season to protect him from being selected by another team in the Rule 5 draft. He made the Padres' Opening Day roster in 2014 and made his MLB debut on April 2, 2014. Roach was designated for assignment by the Padres on November 3, 2014.

=== Chicago Cubs ===
The Chicago Cubs claimed Roach on waivers on November 12, 2014. He was designated for assignment by the Cubs on December 19, 2014, and began the season with the Iowa Cubs of the Triple–A Pacific Coast League. The Cubs promoted Roach to the majors in June. He allowed eight hits and four runs in 3 1/3 innings in his Cubs debut on June 27 as a starter, in a loss to the St. Louis Cardinals.

=== Cincinnati Reds ===
Roach was claimed off waivers by the Cincinnati Reds on July 13, 2015. He was designated for assignment on August 23.

=== Toronto Blue Jays ===
On August 25, 2015, Roach was claimed off waivers by the Toronto Blue Jays. He was designated for assignment by the Blue Jays on September 30, and elected free agency on October 14.

=== Seattle Mariners ===
On December 5, 2015, Roach signed a minor league contract with the Seattle Mariners organization. In 22 games (17 starts) for the Triple–A Tacoma Rainiers, he compiled a 6–6 record and 4.08 ERA with 62 strikeouts across 108 innings. On June 24, 2016, the Mariners selected Roach's contract, adding him to their active roster. In 4 appearances for Seattle, he registered a 2–0 record and 8.44 ERA with 2 strikeouts across 5 1/3 innings of work. On August 6, Roach was designated for assignment by the Mariners.

=== Detroit Tigers ===
Roach was claimed off waivers by the Detroit Tigers on August 9, 2016. In 5 starts for the Triple–A Toledo Mud Hens, he compiled a 3–1 record and 3.03 ERA with 21 strikeouts across 29 2/3 innings pitched. Roach was designated for assignment following the promotion of Joe Mantiply on September 3.

=== Oakland Athletics ===
On September 5, 2016, he was claimed off waivers by the Oakland Athletics. He pitched in one postseason game for the Triple-A Nashville Sounds. On October 6, 2016, Roach was outrighted off of the 40-man roster and elected free agency on October 9.

=== KT Wiz ===
Roach signed with the KT Wiz of the KBO League on November 7, 2016.

=== Chicago White Sox ===
On February 25, 2018, Roach signed a minor league contract to return to affiliated baseball with the Chicago White Sox organization. In 16 games (15 starts) for the Triple–A Charlotte Knights, he registered a 9–2 record and 2.65 ERA with 61 strikeouts over 95 innings.

=== Orix Buffaloes ===
Roach signed with the Orix Buffaloes of Nippon Professional Baseball on July 7, 2018.

=== Chicago White Sox (second stint) ===
On December 30, 2018, Roach signed a minor league contract to return to the Chicago White Sox. He spent 2019 with the Triple–A Charlotte Knights, struggling to a 3–6 record and 7.83 ERA with 53 strikeouts over 79 1/3 innings of work. Roach elected free agency following the season.

=== Uni-President Lions ===
On January 11, 2020, Roach signed with the Uni-President Lions of the Chinese Professional Baseball League. He was released on June 18, after struggling to a 11.35 ERA and 2.26 WHIP over 23 innings pitched.
