= Héctor Rondón =

Venezuelan baseball player (born 1988)

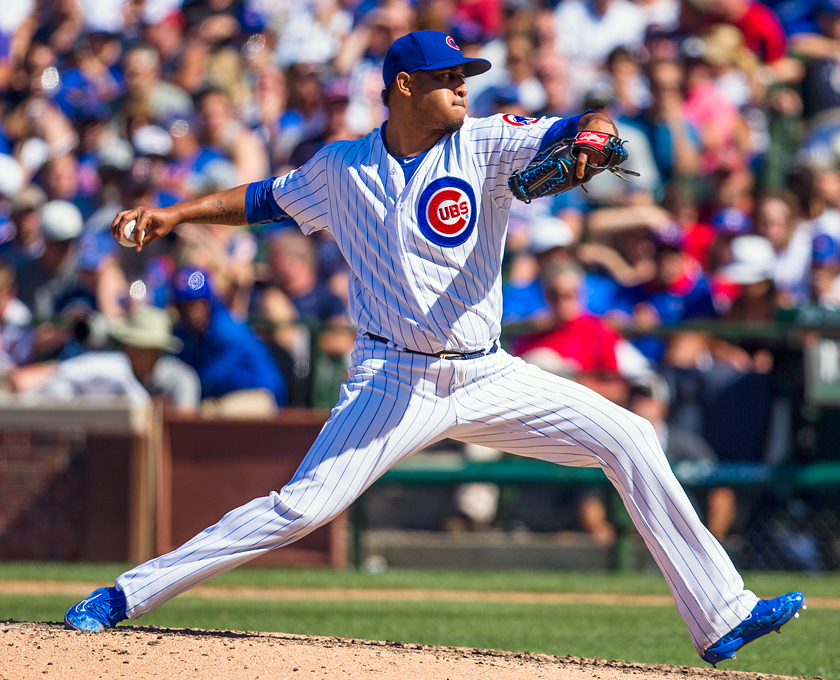
- Rondón pitching for the Chicago Cubs in 2016
- Pitcher
- Born: February 26, 1988 (age 38); Guatire, Venezuela
- Batted: Right Threw: Right

MLB debut
- April 3, 2013, for the Chicago Cubs

Last MLB appearance
- September 26, 2020, for the Arizona Diamondbacks

MLB statistics
- Win–loss record: 24–20
- Earned run average: 3.49
- Strikeouts: 441
- Saves: 92
- Stats at Baseball Reference

Teams
- Chicago Cubs (2013–2017); Houston Astros (2018–2019); Arizona Diamondbacks (2020)

Career highlights and awards
- World Series champion (2016)

Héctor Luis Rondón (born February 26, 1988) is a Venezuelan former professional baseball pitcher. He played in Major League Baseball (MLB) for the Chicago Cubs, Houston Astros, and Arizona Diamondbacks. Rondón signed as an international free agent with the Cleveland Indians in 2004.

== Professional career ==
=== Cleveland Indians ===
Rondón signed as an international free agent with the Cleveland Indians on August 3, 2004. He had Tommy John surgery in 2010, and fractured his elbow in 2011.

=== Chicago Cubs ===
Rondón was selected by the Chicago Cubs from the Indians in the 2012 Rule 5 Draft. He made the Cubs' 2013 Opening Day roster and made his major league debut on April 3. In his first season with the Cubs, he had a 2–1 record with a 4.77 ERA with 44 SO.

After struggles by Cubs closer José Veras early in the 2014 season, Rondón was named the new Cubs closer. He had a breakout 2014 season. He earned two saves in the 2015 National League Division Series against the St. Louis Cardinals, including a save in the series-clinching game 4. With the addition of Aroldis Chapman in late July 2016, Rondon was moved to the setup role in the bullpen. Rondon finished 2016 with a 2–3 record and a 3.53 ERA in 54 appearances. The Cubs won the 2016 World Series over the Cleveland Indians, ending the Cubs' 108-year drought. He was non-tendered and became a free agent on December 1, 2017.

=== Houston Astros ===
On December 15, 2017, Rondón signed a two-year contract with the Houston Astros. In 2018, he was 2–5 with 15 saves and a 3.20 ERA, pitching 59 innings in 63 relief appearances. In 2019, Rondón was 3–2 with a 3.71 ERA, appearing in 62 games (one start) and pitching 60 2/3 innings. He became a free agent following the 2019 season.

=== Arizona Diamondbacks ===
On January 9, 2020, Rondón and the Arizona Diamondbacks agreed to a $3 million, one-year contract. During the shortened 2020 season, he made 23 relief appearances with the Diamondbacks, compiling a 7.65 ERA while striking out 23 batters in 20 innings; he recorded one win and no losses. He became a free agent following the season.

=== Philadelphia Phillies ===
On February 2, 2021, Rondón signed a minor league contract with the Philadelphia Phillies organization and was invited to spring training. On March 25, 2021, Rondón requested and was granted his release by the Phillies.

=== Boston Red Sox ===
On April 3, 2021, Rondón signed a minor league contract with the Boston Red Sox organization. On April 9, 2021, Rondón retired from professional baseball.

== Pitching repertoire ==
Rondón relies primarily on his four-seam fastball (95 mph), slider (85 mph), and also mixing in a sinker (96 mph). He also rarely throws a changeup (90 mph).

== See also ==
- List of Major League Baseball players from Venezuela
