= List of Texas Christian University alumni =

Texas Christian University has more than 90,000 living alumni. Following is a list of notable Texas Christian University alumni by profession.

== Academia ==
- James Cash Jr. – professor emeritus at Harvard Business School, former James E. Robison Professor of Business Administration
- Bobby Chesney – John Jeffers Research Chair in Law, Honorable James A. Baker III Chair in the Rule of Law and World Affairs, dean of University of Texas at Austin School of Law
- Flynt Leverett – counterterrorism scholar and professor at the Penn State School of International Affairs
- Jim Ranchino – pollster, political consultant, and political scientist on the faculty of Ouachita Baptist University in Arkadelphia, Arkansas
- Jeff Sebo – moral philosopher, associate professor, and director of Animal Studies at New York University; author of The Moral Circle
- Miles Smith – historian and associate professor at Hillsdale College

== Art ==
- Glenda Green – artist; author of Love Without End, Jesus Speaks (1998)
- Mary McCleary – contemporary artist with works in numerous public collections

== Business ==
- Brian Alvey – co-founder of Weblogs, Inc.; serial entrepreneur
- Beverley Bass (BA '74) – former American Airlines pilot; first female American Airlines captain and captain of the first all-female commercial jet airliner crew
- Kyle Bass – principal and founder of Hayman Capital Management
- John Davis – billionaire entrepreneur; 1-800-Flowers founder
- Kathryn Farmer – CEO and president of BNSF Railway since 2021; first female CEO of a Class I railroad
- Elliott Hill – president & CEO of Nike, Inc., member of TCU Board of Trustees
- Maciej Kranz – Cisco Systems vice president of innovation
- Nicholas Mollahan - Leeward Renewable Energy Rotational Associate (M&A)

== Education ==
- Leon Breeden – clarinetist and founder of the "Lab Band" program at the University of North Texas
- James Cash Jr. – former chairman of Harvard MBA program; senior associate dean and chairman of HBS Publishing; on boards of GE and Microsoft
- Theresa A. Powell – vice president of academic affairs at Temple University; president of the National Association of Student Personnel Administrators
- Elizabeth MacLeod Walls – 15th president of William Jewell College; 14th president of Washington & Jefferson College

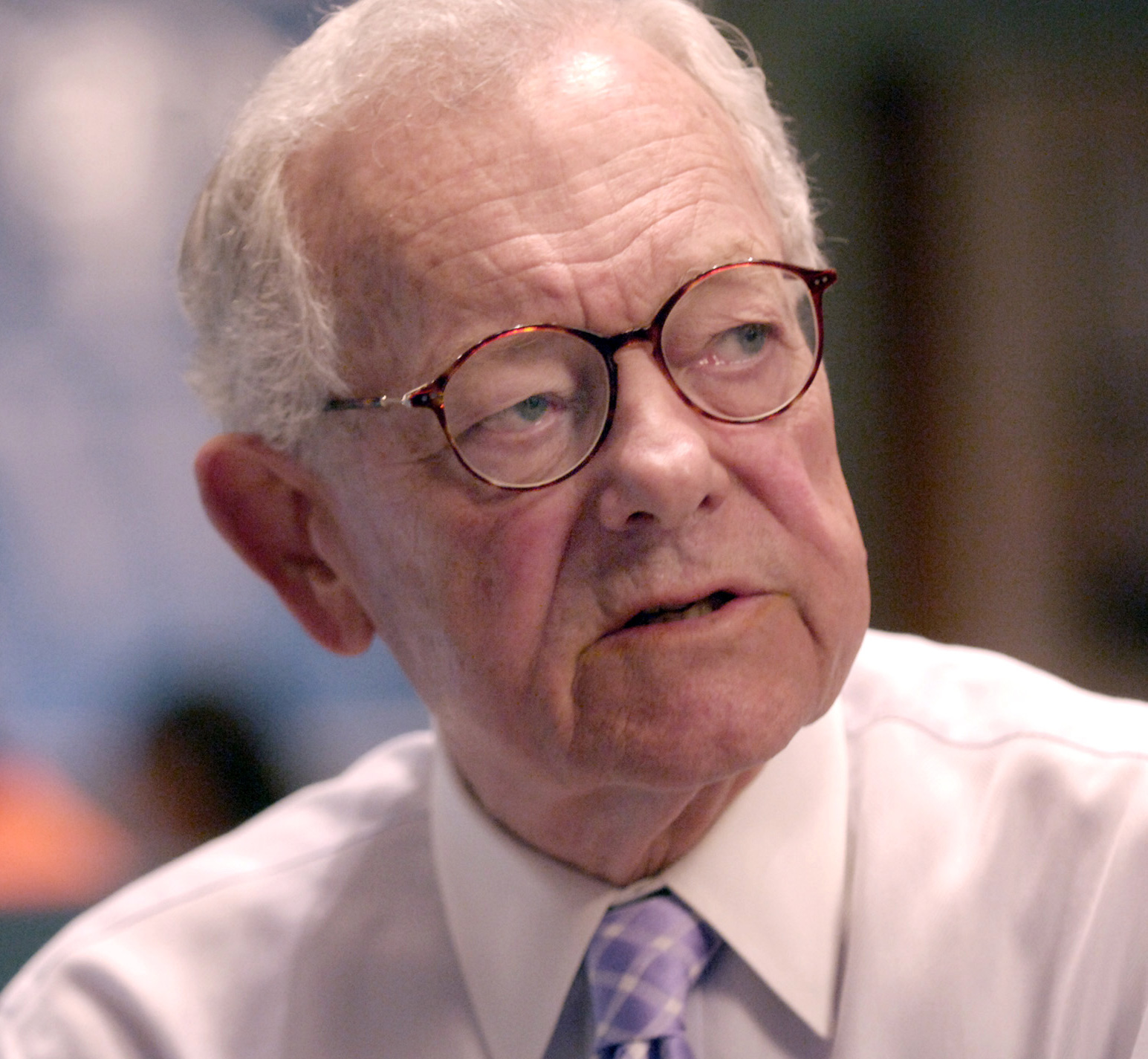
Bob Schieffer, class of '59

== Entertainment ==
- Norman Alden – actor with a fifty-year career in movies and television, mostly in voice roles and small parts
- Cecil Brower – Western swing pioneer
- Betty Buckley – Tony Award-winning actress best known for playing Grizabella in the musical Cats
- Jeremy Culhane – television actor on Saturday Night Live, Dropout and Heathers
- Corby Davidson (attended 1988–1991, did not graduate) – Dallas/Fort Worth sports radio personality with The Ticket 1310am
- Cynthia Dobrinski – handbell composer and clinician
- Kelli Finglass – Dallas Cowboys Cheerleaders, director of the Dallas Cowboys Cheerleaders, television personality, television producer
- Frederic Forrest – actor
- John Gilliland – radio broadcaster who created the Pop Chronicles music documentary
- Skip Hollandsworth – journalist; screenwriter; Executive Editor of Texas Monthly magazine
- Kristin Holt – television personality; former Dallas Cowboys cheerleader; finalist on the original American Idol
- Daniel Hunter – known for his music project, Analog Rebellion (formerly PlayRadioPlay!)
- Benton Jennings – actor in theatre, movies, television, and commercials
- James Kerwin – film and theater director
- Curtis King – founder of Black Academy of Arts and Letters
- Chris Klein – film actor, American Pie, We Were Soldiers Once, And Young, Rollerball
- Wendy Powell – voice actress
- Tudi Roche – actress
- Rod Roddy – former The Price Is Right announcer
- Bob Schieffer – journalist with CBS News since 1969 and host of Face the Nation
- Travis Schuldt – television actor on Passions, 10-8: Officers on Duty and Scrubs
- Sarah Rose Summers – Miss USA 2018
- Rob Thomas – writer, Veronica Mars and Rats Saw God
- Nina Vance – founder, Alley Theatre in Houston, Texas
- Stephanie Vander Werf – model, TV presenter and beauty pageant contestant; Miss Panama 2012; represented Panama at the Miss Universe 2012
- Shantel VanSanten – actress, One Tree Hill, Final Destination 4, You and I
- Van Williams – television actor on Bourbon Street Beat, Surfside 6, and the Green Hornet
- Travis Willingham – voice actor
- Peggy Willis-Aarnio – ballet historian

== Law ==
- Tim Curry – district attorney for Tarrant County from 1972 until his death in 2009
- S. Maurice Hicks, Jr. – chief judge, United States District Court for the Western District of Louisiana
- Zuberi Williams – associate judge, Maryland District Court (2015–present)

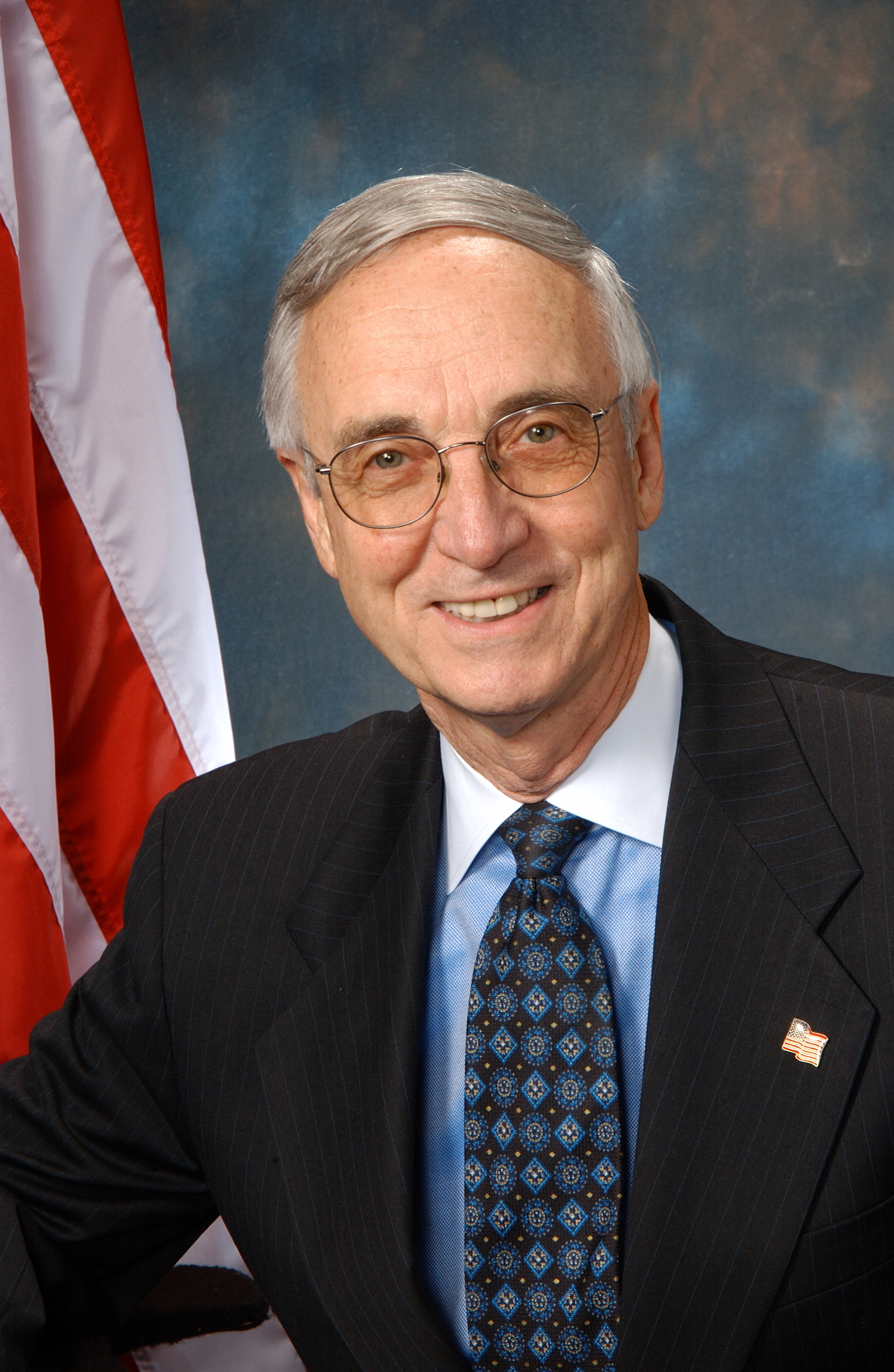
Gordon England, former secretary of the Navy

== Military ==
- Horace S. Carswell Jr. – recipient of the Congressional Medal of Honor
- Gordon R. England (MBA '75) – 71st & 73rd secretary of the Navy; deputy secretary of defense (2005–2009)

== Music ==
- Leon Breeden – clarinetist and founder of the Lab Band program at the University of North Texas
- Mario Cruz – saxophone player, played with Bruce Springsteen and Jaco Pastorius among others
- Don Gillis – composer, producer for the NBC Symphony Orchestra during the tenure of its conductor Arturo Toscanini
- John Giordano – saxophonist, composer, and conductor of the Fort Worth Symphony Orchestra
- Clyde Hurley – jazz trumpeter soloist in "In the Mood" by Glenn Miller Band
- John Knowles – guitarist
- William Lewis – opera singer
- William Walker – Metropolitan Opera baritone

== Politics ==
- Dan Boren – former U.S. representative from Oklahoma's 2nd congressional district
- Israel B. Curtis – Louisiana politician, did graduate studies at TCU
- Wendy Davis – 2014 candidate for Texas governor; former state senator in the Texas Senate
- Hou Chong-wen – deputy mayor of Chiayi City, Taiwan
- Eddie Bernice Johnson (B.S. 1967) – U.S. representative, Texas 30th congressional district
- Kyle Kacal (Certificate in Ranch Management) – member of the Texas House of Representatives from College Station since 2013
- Lois Kolkhorst (Class of 1988) – member of the Texas Senate since 2014 and former member of the Texas House of Representatives
- Mike Lang – member of Texas House of Representatives since 2017
- Tommy Merritt – former member of Texas House of Representatives and candidate for Texas Department of Agriculture
- Thomas Pressly – member of the Louisiana Senate since 2024 and former member of the Louisiana House of Representatives
- Winthrop Paul Rockefeller – former lieutenant governor of Arkansas 1996–2006
- John Roger Williams – U.S. representative and former secretary of state of Texas

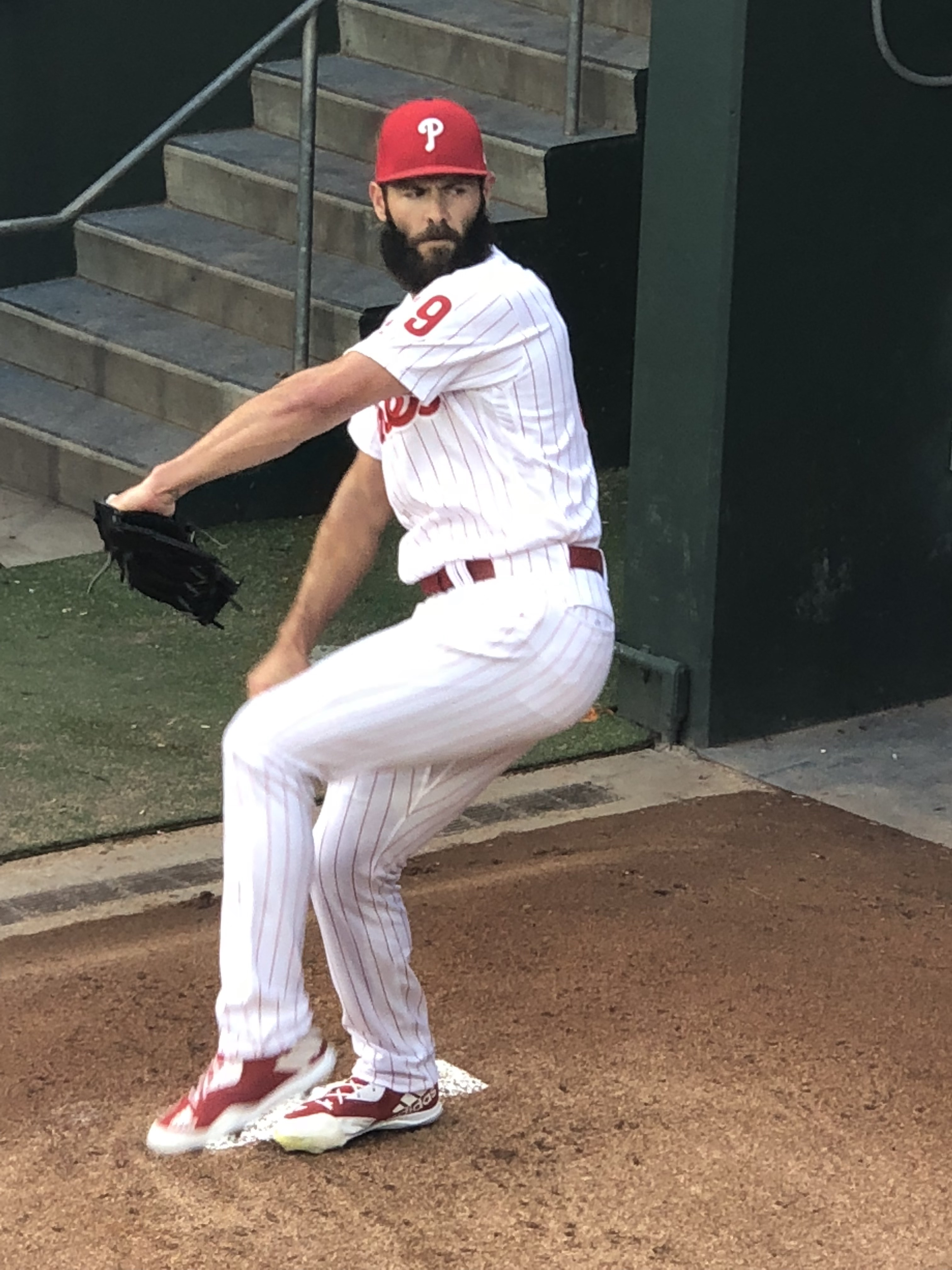
Jake Arrieta

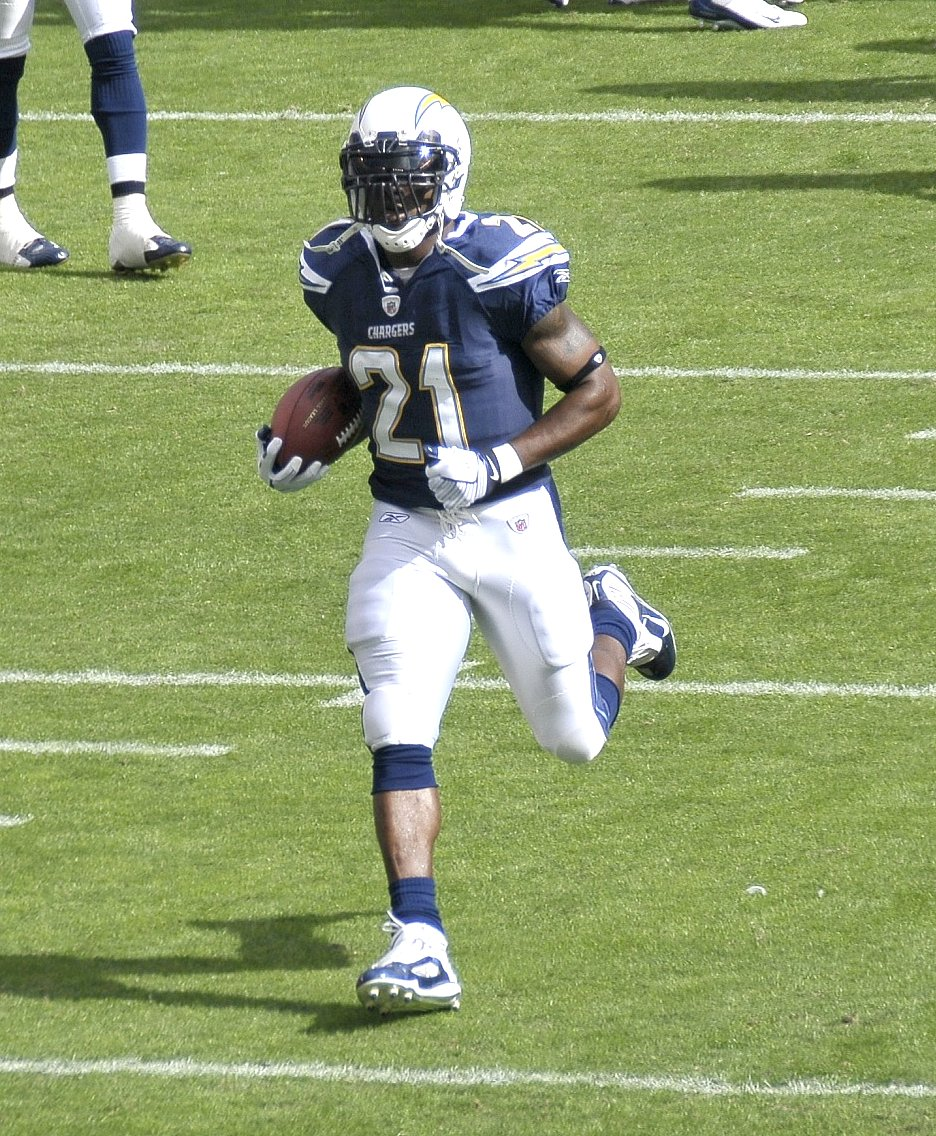
LaDainian Tomlinson, class of 2005

== Sports ==
- Scott Ankrom – former Dallas Cowboys wide receiver
- Jake Arrieta – MLB pitcher Baltimore Orioles (2010–13), Chicago Cubs (2013–2017), Philadelphia Phillies (2018–2020)
- Ronnie Baker – sprinter
- Desmond Bane – NBA, selected 30th overall in the 2020 NBA draft, selected for Rising Stars Challenge at 2022 NBA All-Star Game
- Pat Batteaux – former NFL player
- Sammy Baugh – 1935 Heisman Trophy finalist; member of the Pro Football Hall of Fame
- Josh Boyce – wide receiver, New England Patriots
- Scott Brooks – former NBA point guard and current Oklahoma City Thunder head coach; won Coach of the Year Award 2010
- Larry Brown – former cornerback for the Dallas Cowboys and Oakland Raiders, and Super Bowl XXX MVP
- David Caldwell – former nose tackle for the Green Bay Packers
- Tank Carder – 2011 Rose Bowl defensive MVP; linebacker for the Cleveland Browns
- Matt Carpenter – MLB All-Star for the St. Louis Cardinals
- Andrew Cashner – pitcher for the Miami Marlins
- Ron Clinkscale – quarterback, Canadian Football League
- Bill Collins – Masters Athletics world record holder
- Roosevelt Collins – former NFL player
- Charles Coody – PGA golf professional, Class of 1960, Texas Sports Hall of Fame (2000)
- Norm Cox – former professional football player
- Édgar Crespo – Olympic swimmer from Panama
- Andy Dalton (class of 2010) – 2011 Rose Bowl offensive MVP; Pro Bowl quarterback for the Cincinnati Bengals
- Kenneth E. Davis – 1984 Heisman Trophy finalist; All-American running back
- Jamie Dixon – TCU men's basketball head coach; former head coach for the University of Pittsburgh
- Josh Doctson – wide receiver for the Minnesota Vikings
- Max Duggan – quarterback for the Los Angeles Chargers
- Taylor Featherston – infielder for the Philadelphia Phillies
- Brandon Finnegan – pitcher for the Cincinnati Reds, formerly of the Kansas City Royals; became the first player to play in a College World Series and an MLB World Series in the same year
- Keith Flowers – former NFL player
- Bobby Jack Floyd – former fullback for the Green Bay Packers and Chicago Bears
- Larry Foyt – semi-retired NASCAR and IRL driver
- Jeff Gladney – cornerback for the Minnesota Vikings and the Arizona Cardinals
- Clint Gresham – long snapper for the Seattle Seahawks
- Phil Handler – former NFL football player and coach
- J. J. Henry – PGA golfer, member of the 2006 Ryder Cup team
- Tom Hoge – PGA golfer
- Bryan Holaday – catcher for the Boston Red Sox
- Jerry Hughes – linebacker for the Buffalo Bills
- Sandora Irvin – former WNBA player, San Antonio Silver Stars
- Quentin Johnston – wide receiver for the Los Angeles Chargers
- Jeremy Kerley – wide receiver for the San Francisco 49ers
- Harry Kinzy – former MLB pitcher
- Max Knake – former Arena Football League quarterback
- Jenny Lidback – former LPGA golfer
- Bob Lilly – former Dallas Cowboys defensive tackle; member of the Pro Football Hall of Fame
- Robert Lyles – NFL linebacker for Houston Oilers, Atlanta Falcons
- Stansly Maponga – defensive end for the New York Giants
- George McLeod – former NBA player
- Guy Morriss – former NFL Pro Bowl center; former head football coach at Baylor University and University of Kentucky
- Lee Nailon – former NBA player
- Marshall Newhouse – offensive tackle for the Oakland Raiders
- Jeff Newman – former MLB All Star player for the Boston Red Sox and Oakland Athletics
- Cameron Norrie – British tennis player
- Davey O'Brien – 1938 Heisman Trophy winner; won the Walter Camp and Maxwell Award the same year
- David Pate – 1991 Australian Open Men's Doubles Champion; runner-up of the 1991 US Open in Men's Doubles
- Matt Purke – pitcher for the Chicago White Sox
- Mike Renfro – former NFL receiver for the Houston Oilers and the Dallas Cowboys
- Joe Robb – defensive end, Philadelphia Eagles 1959–60, St Louis Cardinals 1961–67, Pro Bowl 1966, Detroit Lions 1968–71, & WFL 1972–74
- Khadevis Robinson – Olympian in the 800 meter run; multiple USATF gold medalist; world record-breaker, running the fastest leg in the 4x800 in 2006
- Yazmeen Ryan – professional soccer player for Houston Dash of the National Women's Soccer League (NWSL) and the United States national team.
- Aaron Schobel – retired Pro Bowl defensive end with the NFL's Buffalo Bills
- Bo Schobel – former defensive end with the NFL's Arizona Cardinals
- Matt Schobel – former tight end with the NFL's Philadelphia Eagles
- Angela Stanford – professional golfer on the LPGA Tour
- Jim Swink – All-American running back; member of the College Football Hall of Fame; runner-up for the 1955 Heisman Trophy
- Kurt Thomas – former NBA player
- LaDainian Tomlinson – 2006 NFL MVP and 2000 Heisman Trophy finalist; San Diego Chargers 2001–09; New York Jets 2010–2011
- Gregg Troy – head coach of the University of Florida swimming and diving team
- Kris Tschetter – former professional golfer on the LPGA Tour
- Jason Tucker – former wide receiver for the Canadian Football League's Edmonton Eskimos; four-time All Star; 91st Grey Cup MVP
- Johnny Vaught – 1932 All-American guard for TCU; former head coach of the University of Mississippi; member of the College Football Hall of Fame
- Jason Verrett – cornerback for the San Francisco 49ers
- Will Walls – former NFL football player
- Daryl Washington – linebacker for the Arizona Cardinals
- Kenrich Williams – NBA basketball player for the Oklahoma City Thunder
- Malcolm Williams – cornerback for the New England Patriots
- Jeff Zimmerman – former All-Star pitcher for the Texas Rangers
- Nicholas Mollahan - Professional golfer on the PGA Tour

== Writing and journalism ==
- Sandra Brown – bestselling fiction author
- Dan Jenkins – bestselling author and Sports Illustrated writer
- Sue Monk Kidd – bestselling author of The Secret Life of Bees
- Robert W. Russell – pen name Nas'Naga (1941–2021), poet and novelist from Ohio
- Bud Shrake – sportswriter and author

== Other ==
- Carson Huey-You – youngest graduate in TCU history, graduated with a bachelor's degree in physics at age 14
- Sarah Jakes Roberts – pastor, author, and nonprofit executive.

== Fictional alumni ==
- The Professor (Roy Hinkley) – character from the 1960s TV series Gilligan's Island; has, among his six degrees, a Ph.D. from TCU
- Reverend Timothy Lovejoy – animated character from The Simpsons
- Earl Walker – character from Jonathan Franzen's novel Purity; is seen "wearing a sweat suit with the purple and white of Texas Christian University"
