= George Drouillard =

Scout on the Louis and Clark Expedition

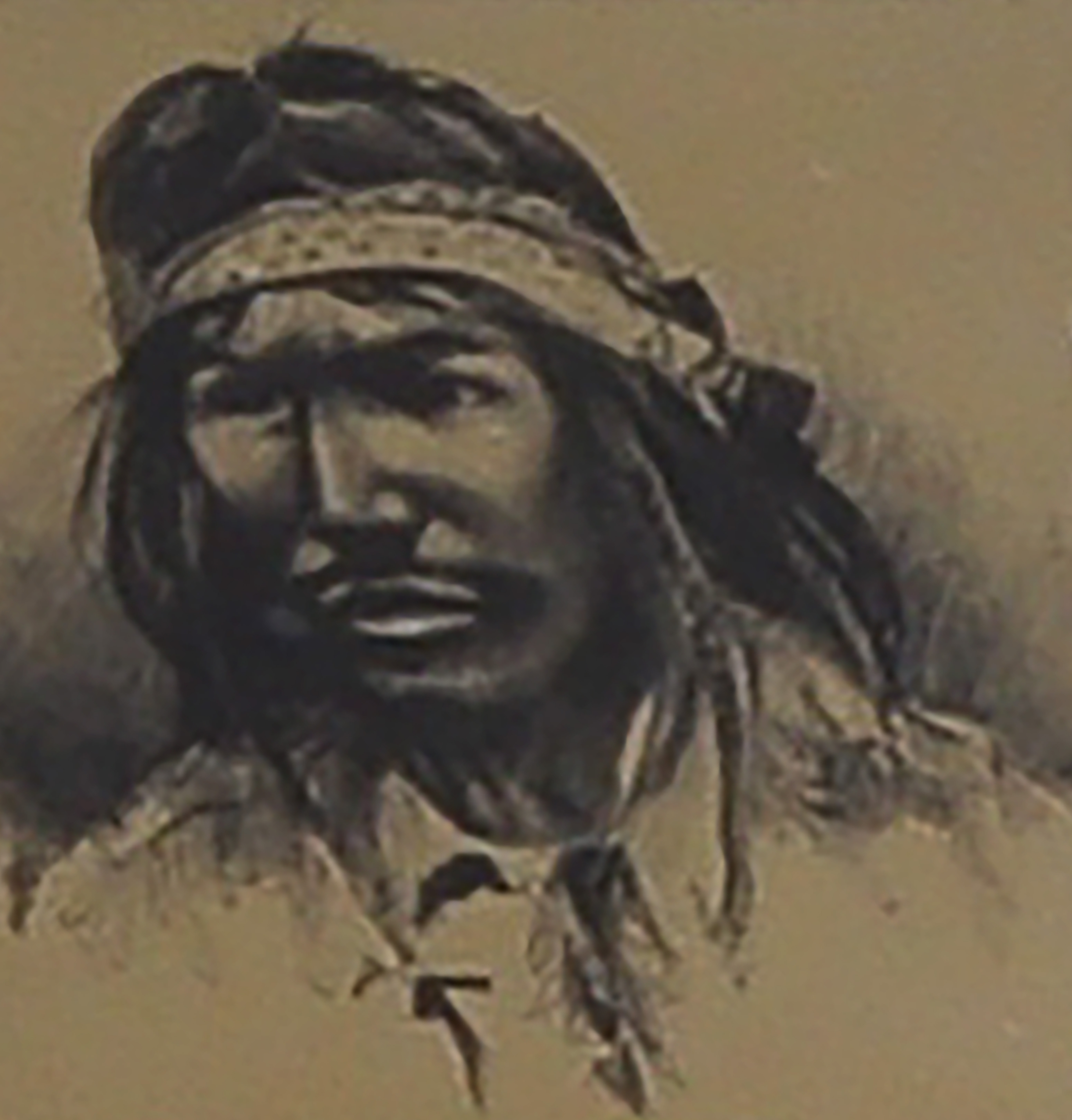
George Drouillard

George Drouillard (c. 1773–1810) was a civilian interpreter, scout, hunter, and cartographer, hired for Lewis and Clark's Voyage of Discovery to explore the territory of the Louisiana Purchase in 1804–1806, in search of a water route to the Pacific Ocean. He later worked as a guide and trapper for Manuel Lisa on the upper Missouri River, joining his Missouri Fur Company in 1809. It is believed that Drouillard was killed in what is now the state of Montana while trapping beaver, in an attack by the Blackfeet or Gros Ventre tribes.

== Early life ==
George Drouillard was born into the Shawnee nation in 1773 (or 1775) in the present-day Olde Sandwich Towne, Windsor, Ontario, Canada, son of Pierre Drouillard, a French Canadian, and Asoundechris Flat Head, a Shawnee. At the time of the American Revolutionary War, Pierre Drouillard was employed by the British Indian Department as a trader and interpreter of the Huron language, of the Iroquoian language family. Pierre Drouillard was commissioned as a captain by the British army. Drouillard is credited with saving the life of colonist and explorer Simon Kenton, held as a prisoner of the Shawnee at Sandusky, Ohio, in 1778. He brought gifts to trade for Kenton's life and said the British needed to interrogate the man about revolutionary activities on the frontier.

As a boy, George Drouillard learned to read and write. He then acquired frontier skills by becoming a hunter, a trapper, and a cartographer. He grew up speaking Shawnee, French, and English. He also was proficient at the sign language common among Native American peoples of different language families.

== Lewis and Clark Expedition ==
At age 28, Drouillard was hired by Captain Meriwether Lewis for the United States' official expedition into the newly acquired Louisiana Territory. He went to Tennessee in late 1803 to escort eight volunteers of the party to St. Louis, where the Corps of Discovery was wintering at Fort Dubois outside the city. Only four of the volunteers were accepted by Lewis and Clark. The expedition departed St. Louis in early 1804. Lewis, who mentioned Drouillard often in his journals (referring to him as "Drewyer" in a transliteration of his French name), praised the young man highly as the most skilled hunter among all the men of the party. Drouillard often brought in six elk per day, and one day he killed eleven elk.

Both his hunting and interpretive skills helped the expedition survive the severe winter of 1804–05. Drouillard established good relations with the Mandan people, who aided the members of the expedition. The Corps built Fort Mandan as their winter quarters. Lewis recognized that Drouillard's language skills were critical to the expedition, as when they were scouting for Shoshone in present-day Montana. He wrote on August 14, 1805:

"The means I had of communicating with these people was by way of Drewyer [Drouillard] who understood perfectly the common language of jesticulation [sic] or signs which seems to be universally understood by all the Nations we have yet seen. It is true that this language is imperfect and liable to error but is much less so than would be expected. The strong parts of the ideas are seldom mistaken."

== Missouri Fur Company ==
In 1807, Drouillard traveled again up the Missouri River as part of an expedition led by the Spanish fur trader Manuel Lisa; others in the party included John Potts, Peter Weise and John Colter, all of whom had also been part of the Lewis and Clark Expedition. During the winter of 1807–08, Drouillard traveled the lands of the Crow Indians in the Bighorn Mountains. He gathered information which he gave to William Clark after returning to St. Louis; Clark improved his maps of the area with the additions. In 1809, Drouillard joined Lisa's Missouri Fur Company, based in St. Louis. The city was developing rapidly based on revenues from the western fur trade. Lisa sent his trappers to the upper Missouri River for furs.

== Death ==
In 1810, Drouillard failed to return from a beaver-trapping trip in the Three Forks region of the upper Missouri River, where the expedition had already encountered hostilities from the Blackfeet and Gros Ventre peoples. A search party found the remains of him and his horse. Drouillard had been beheaded, and his entrails were strewn about in ritual mutilation. From evidence at the site, his comrades said that he must have fought and killed several Native Americans before his death. The Americans hastily buried him in an unmarked grave.

== Legacy and honors ==
- Mount Drouillard (formerly Mount Drewyer) in Teton County, Montana, is named in his honor.
- The George Drouillard Museum was established in 1996 near Bellefontaine, Ohio by the Shawnee Nation, URB, a state-recognized tribe, as part of their complex including the Zane Shawnee Caverns.
- March 2013, the Grundy County Heritage Museum in Morrison, Iowa, had an exhibit and program featuring the life of George Drouillard. Darrel Draper of Nebraska performed as the interpreter and hunter.

== In popular culture ==
James Alexander Thom wrote a novel, Sign-Talker (2000), about the life of George Drouillard.
