= James Cash =

James Cash may refer to:

- James Cash Jr. (born 1947), American businessman
- Jim Cash (1941–2000), American film writer
