= List of Chicago Cubs no-hitters =

The Chicago Cubs are a Major League Baseball franchise based in Chicago. They play in the National League Central division. Also known in their early years as the "Chicago White Stockings" (1876–1889), "Chicago Colts" (1890–1897), and "Chicago Orphans" (1898–1902), pitchers for the Cubs have thrown 18 no-hitters in franchise history. A no-hitter is officially recognized by Major League Baseball only "when a pitcher (or pitchers) allows no hits during the entire course of a game, which consists of at least nine innings". No-hitters of fewer than nine complete innings were previously recognized by the league as official; however, several rule alterations in 1991 changed the rule to its current form.

No Cubs pitcher has yet pitched a perfect game. The closest performance came on September 2, 1972, when Milt Pappas lost his perfect game bid against the San Diego Padres with two outs in the ninth by allowing a walk to Larry Stahl on a 3–2 count; he retired the next batter to finish the no-hitter. During that at-bat, he was ahead of the batter with a 0–2 count before throwing four straight close pitches to allow the walk.

Larry Corcoran threw the first no-hitter in Cubs history on August 19, 1880; the most recent no-hitter was thrown by Shota Imanaga on September 4, 2024. Three left-handed pitchers and ten right-handed pitchers have thrown no-hitters in franchise history; one no-hitter was combined across four pitchers. Corcoran, Arrieta and Ken Holtzman are the only pitchers in Cubs history to throw more than one no-hitter. Corcoran threw three and Arrieta and Holtzman threw two.

On July 31, 1910, King Cole of the Cubs pitched all seven innings in a 4–0 win over the St. Louis Cardinals, without giving up a hit. The second game of a doubleheader, the teams had agreed to end the game at 5 p.m. so they could catch their trains. Due to a 1991 change to the official MLB definition of a no-hitter—it must last at least nine innings—Cole's effort is not recognized by as a no-hitter by MLB and does not appear on the below list.

Nine no-hitters were thrown at home, six on the road, and one at a neutral site. Two occurred in April, two in May, three in June, one in July, five in August, and five in September. A different umpire presided over each of the franchise's 18 no-hitters. 11 different managers led the team during the franchise's 18 no-hitters.

The longest interval between no-hitters was between the games pitched by Jimmy Lavender and Sam Jones, encompassing 39 years, 8 months, and 12 days from August 31, 1915, until May 12, 1955. The shortest interval in days between no-hitters was between the games pitched by Burt Hooton and Milt Pappas, encompassing four months and sixteen days from April 16, 1972, until September 2, 1972. The shortest interval in games between no-hitters was between the games pitched by Jake Arrieta on August 30, 2015, and April 21, 2016, 49 regular-season games. (The Cubs also played nine postseason games in October 2015, between these two no-hitters.)

Cubs pitchers have thrown two no-hitters against the Atlanta Braves and their predecessors – one by Corcoran in 1880 and one by Holtzman in 1969. They also threw two no-hitters against the Cincinnati Reds: Holtzman in 1971, Arrieta in 2016.

The Cubs have not allowed a run in any of their no-hitters. The most baserunners allowed in a no-hitter was eight in the Cubs' combined no-hitter in 2021. Of the 17 no-hitters, four have been won by a score of 4–0, more than any other score. The largest margin of victory in a no-hitter (and the largest margin of victory in an MLB no-hitter since 1900) was a 16–0 win by Arrieta in 2016. The smallest margin of victory was a 1–0 win by Holtzman in 1971.

In the 1990 film Taking Care of Business, the no-hitters thrown by Burt Hooton and Milt Pappas during the 1972 season are the subject of a radio trivia contest that sets up the film's plot, which features the Cubs playing in the World Series.

== List of no-hitters in Cubs history ==
¶	Indicates a perfect game
£	Pitcher was left-handed
*	Member of the National Baseball Hall of Fame and Museum

#	Date	Pitcher	Final score	Base- runners	Opponent	Catcher	Plate umpire	Manager	Notes	Ref
1	August 19, 1880	Larry Corcoran (1)	6–0	4	Boston Red Caps	Silver Flint (1)	Herm Doscher	Cap Anson (1)	First no-hitter in franchise history; First no-hitter at home in franchise history; First right-handed pitcher to throw a no-hitter in franchise history	
2	September 20, 1882	Larry Corcoran (2)	5–0	4	Worcester Ruby Legs	Silver Flint (2)	Kick Kelly	Cap Anson (2)	Latest calendar date of franchise's no-hitter; First pitcher to throw two no-hitters	
3	June 27, 1884	Larry Corcoran (3)	6–0	5	Providence Grays	Silver Flint (3)	Billy McLean	Cap Anson (3)	First pitcher to throw three no-hitters, the record would stand until Sandy Koufax threw his fourth no-hitter in 1965	
4	July 27, 1885	John Clarkson*	4–0	3	@ Providence Grays	Silver Flint (4)	Tommy Bond	Cap Anson (4)	First Cubs no-hitter on the road	
5	August 21, 1898	Walter Thornton^{£}	2–0	3	Brooklyn Bridegrooms	Tim Donahue	James McDonald	Tom Burns	First left-handed pitcher to throw a no-hitter in franchise history	
6	August 31, 1915	Jimmy Lavender	2–0	2	@ New York Giants (NL)	Jimmy Archer	Bill Klem	Roger Bresnahan	First game of a doubleheader	
7	May 12, 1955	Sam Jones	4–0	7	Pittsburgh Pirates	Clyde McCullough	Artie Gore	Stan Hack	Longest interval between no-hitters in franchise history; First no-hitter by black pitcher	
8	May 15, 1960	Don Cardwell	4–0	1	St. Louis Cardinals	Del Rice	Tony Venzon	Charlie Grimm	Second game of a doubleheader; First start after being acquired by Phillies	
9	August 19, 1969	Ken Holtzman^{£} (1)	3–0	3	Atlanta Braves	Bill Heath (7 2/3 IP); Gene Oliver (1 1/3 IP)	Dick Stello	Leo Durocher (1)	Holtzman did not strike out a batter the entire game	
10	June 3, 1971	Ken Holtzman^{£} (2)	1–0	4	@ Cincinnati Reds	Danny Breeden	Satch Davidson	Leo Durocher (2)	Holtzman scored the game's only run; Smallest margin of victory in a franchise's no-hitter	
11	April 16, 1972	Burt Hooton	4–0	7	Philadelphia Phillies	Randy Hundley (1)	Paul Pryor	Leo Durocher (3)	Game 2 of season; Earliest calendar date of franchise's no-hitter	
12	September 2, 1972	Milt Pappas	8–0	1	San Diego Padres	Randy Hundley (2)	Bruce Froemming	Whitey Lockman	Shortest interval in days between no-hitters in franchise history; Only base runner reached on a walk with two outs in the ninth inning	
13	September 14, 2008	Carlos Zambrano	5–0	2	@ Houston Astros	Geovany Soto	Tim Tschida	Lou Piniella	Played at Miller Park in Milwaukee because of Hurricane Ike, making it the first and only no-hitter at a neutral site	
14	August 30, 2015	Jake Arrieta (1)	2–0	2	@ Los Angeles Dodgers	Miguel Montero	Pat Hoberg	Joe Maddon (1)	First no-hitter by visiting pitcher at Dodger Stadium since 1994	
15	April 21, 2016	Jake Arrieta (2)	16–0	4	@ Cincinnati Reds	David Ross	Dana DeMuth	Joe Maddon (2)	Largest margin of victory in a franchise's no-hitter; Modern era Major League record (since 1901) for most runs scored by the winning team in a no-hitter; Shortest interval in games between no-hitters in franchise history	
16	September 13, 2020	Alec Mills	12–0	3	@ Milwaukee Brewers	Víctor Caratini	Chris Segal	David Ross (1)	Took place with no fans in attendance due to the COVID-19 pandemic	
17	June 24, 2021	Zach Davies (6 IP); Ryan Tepera (1 IP); Andrew Chafin^{£} (1 IP); Craig Kimbrel (1 IP)	4–0	8	@ Los Angeles Dodgers	Willson Contreras	Brian O'Nora	David Ross (2)	First combined no-hitter in franchise history; Most baserunners allowed in a franchise's no-hitter	
18	September 4, 2024	Shota Imanaga^{£} (7 IP); Nate Pearson (1 IP); Porter Hodge (1 IP)	12–0	5	Pittsburgh Pirates	Miguel Amaya	Emil Jimenez	Craig Counsell	First Cubs no-hitter at Wrigley Field since 1972; Second combined no-hitter in franchise history	

== See also ==
- List of Major League Baseball no-hitters
