= Víctor Caratini =

Puerto Rican baseball player (born 1993)

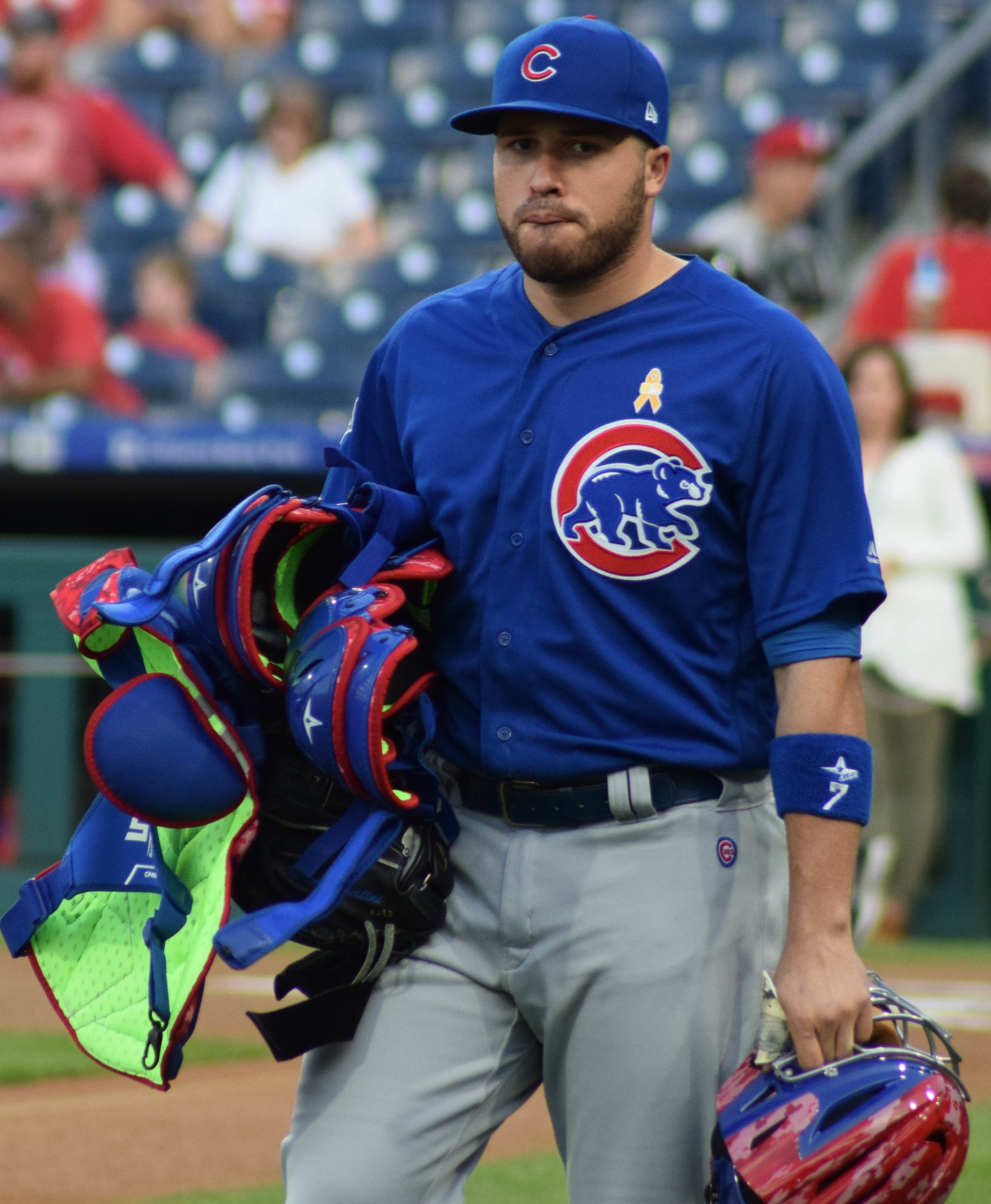
- Caratini with the Chicago Cubs in 2018

Minnesota Twins – No. 37
- Catcher / First baseman
- Born: August 17, 1993 (age 33); Coamo, Puerto Rico
- Bats: Switch Throws: Right

MLB debut
- June 28, 2017, for the Chicago Cubs

MLB statistics (through 2026 season)
- Batting average: .241
- Home runs: 65
- Runs batted in: 291
- Stats at Baseball Reference

Teams
- Chicago Cubs (2017–2020); San Diego Padres (2021); Milwaukee Brewers (2022–2023); Houston Astros (2024–2025); Minnesota Twins (2026–present)

Víctor Manuel Caratini (born August 17, 1993) is a Puerto Rican professional baseball catcher and first baseman for the Minnesota Twins of Major League Baseball (MLB). He has previously played in MLB for the Chicago Cubs, San Diego Padres, Milwaukee Brewers, and Houston Astros. Listed at 6 feet 1 inch (1.85 m) and 215 pounds (98 kg), he throws right-handed and is a switch hitter.

Caratini has caught two no-hitters in the major leagues, the first as a member of the Cubs, and second as a member of the Padres. As they occurred in succession, he became the first player to catch consecutive no-hitters occurring for different clubs. The no-hitter caught for the Padres, on April 9, 2021, was the first in franchise history.

== Career ==
=== Atlanta Braves ===
Caratini was drafted by the Atlanta Braves in the second round of the 2013 Major League Baseball draft out of Miami Dade College. He made his professional debut that season with the Danville Braves. After primarily playing third base his first season, Caratini played mostly as a catcher in 2014. He started the season with the Rome Braves.

=== Chicago Cubs ===
On July 31, 2014, the Braves traded Caratini to the Chicago Cubs for Emilio Bonifacio and James Russell. The Cubs sent him to the Kane County Cougars, where he finished the season. Caratini spent the 2015 season with the Myrtle Beach Pelicans where he batted .257, with four home runs and 53 runs batted in. He spent the 2016 season with the Tennessee Smokies, where he batted .291 with six home runs and 47 runs batted in. After the 2016 season, Caratini played for the Mesa Solar Sox of the Arizona Fall League and was added to the Cubs 40-man roster.

Caratini began the 2017 season with the Iowa Cubs of the Triple-A Pacific Coast League. The Cubs promoted Caratini to the major leagues on June 28, 2017. He appeared in 31 games with the 2017 Cubs, batting .254 with one home run and two runs batted in. In 2018, Caratini played in 76 MLB games, batting .232 with two home runs and 21 runs batted in. He made two pitching appearances during the season, both in late July, pitching a total of two innings while allowing two runs for a 9.00 earned run average. He also played in the 2018 National League Wild Card Game, grounding out as a pinch hitter, as the Cubs fell to the Colorado Rockies, 2–1 in 13 innings.

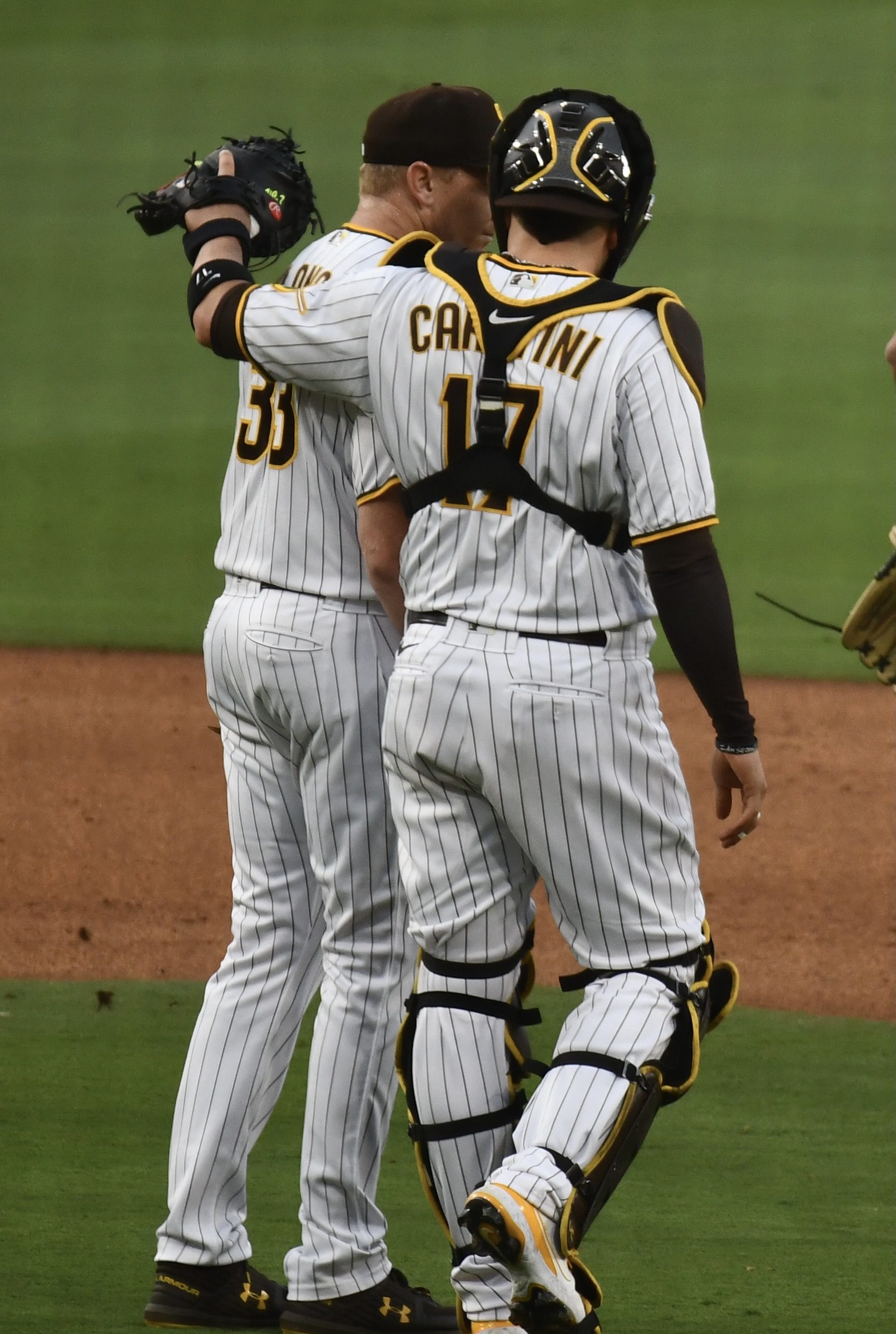
Caratini congratulating Mark Melancon after a win

Caratini began the 2019 season as one of the Cubs' two catchers, along with Willson Contreras. Caratini made another pitching appearance on June 22, pitching a scoreless ninth inning in a Cubs loss to the New York Mets. On the year, Caratini slashed .266/.348/.447 with career-highs in home runs (11) and runs batted in (34) in 95 games for the Cubs.

On September 13, 2020, Caratini caught a no-hitter against the Milwaukee Brewers for teammate Alec Mills. In the pandemic-shortened 2020 season, Caratini batted .241/.333/.328 in 44 games for Chicago, with one home run and 16 runs batted in over 132 plate appearances.

=== San Diego Padres ===
On December 29, 2020, Caratini and Yu Darvish were traded to the San Diego Padres in exchange for pitcher Zach Davies, Reginald Preciado, Yeison Santana, Ismael Mena, and Owen Caissie.

On April 9, 2021, Caratini caught a no-hitter against the Texas Rangers for starter Joe Musgrove, the first no-hitter in Padres history and the second no-hitter he had caught in eight months. As the previous no-hitter in MLB was the one he had caught with the Cubs, this made Caratini the first catcher in MLB history to catch consecutive no-hitters for two different teams. On June 17, 2021, Caratini hit his first career walk-off home run against pitcher Amir Garrett and the Cincinnati Reds. In 2021, Caratini played in a career-high 116 games and batted .227/.309/.323 with 7 home runs and 39 RBIs.

On March 22, 2022, Caratini signed a $2 million contract with the Padres, avoiding salary arbitration.

=== Milwaukee Brewers ===
On April 6, 2022, Caratini was traded to the Milwaukee Brewers in exchange for Brett Sullivan and Korry Howell. On July 4, 2022, Caratini hit his second career walk-off home run against Scott Effross and his former team, the Chicago Cubs. He became the fifth player in major league history to strike out four times before hitting a walk-off home run. In 95 games with Milwaukee in 2022, he batted .199/.300/.342 with 9 home runs and 34 RBIs.

On January 12, 2023, Caratini agreed to a one-year, $2.8 million contract with the Brewers, avoiding salary arbitration. He became a free agent following the season.

=== Houston Astros ===
On December 6, 2023, Caratini signed a 2 year, $12 million contract with the Houston Astros.

On April 30, 2024, Caratini hit a pinch-hit, walk-off, 2-run home run with 2 outs in the bottom of the 10th inning to make the final score 10–9 versus the Cleveland Guardians. On May 14, Caratini delivered a pinch-hit, walk-off 10th-inning single to secure a 2–1 win over the Oakland Athletics. Caratini hit his first major league triple on June 15 off Jack Flaherty in 12–5 loss to the Detroit Tigers at Minute Maid Park. On June 21, 2024, the Astros placed Caratini on the 10-day IL as a result of a left hip flexor strain, and activated him on July 22. He caught rookie Spencer Arrighetti's no-hit bid on August 28, 2024, versus the Philadelphia Phillies, that lasted 7 2/3 innings.

For the 2024 season, Caratini batted .269/.336/.408 with 8 home runs, 30 RBI, and 30 runs scored in 269 plate appearances. He played in 87 total games, with 58 appearances as catcher, 11 as first baseman, 3 as designated hitter, and 20 as pinch hitter. As a pinch hitter, he hit 8-for-19 (.421 average) with 1 home run and 5 RBI.

Caratini delivered a go-ahead, two-run single in the seventh inning on May 28, 2025, for a 5–3 Astros lead and final score over the Athletics. Over a four-day span on July 1st and 4th, Caratini smashed his third and fourth career grand slams, first at Coors Field and then at Dodger Stadium, respectively. In 2025, he appeared in 114 games, including 49 catcher, 15 at first base, 30 as the designated hitter, and 25 as pinch hitter. Caratini established career highs each with 386 plate appearances, 89 hits, 14 doubles, 12 home runs, and 46 RBI. He delivered a .259/.304/.424/.728 slash line.

=== Minnesota Twins ===
On January 23, 2026, Caratini signed a two-year, $14 million contract with the Minnesota Twins.

== See also ==
- List of Chicago Cubs no-hitters
- List of Major League Baseball no-hitters
- List of Major League Baseball players from Puerto Rico
- List of San Diego Padres no-hitters
