= Jake Arrieta =

American baseball player (born 1986)

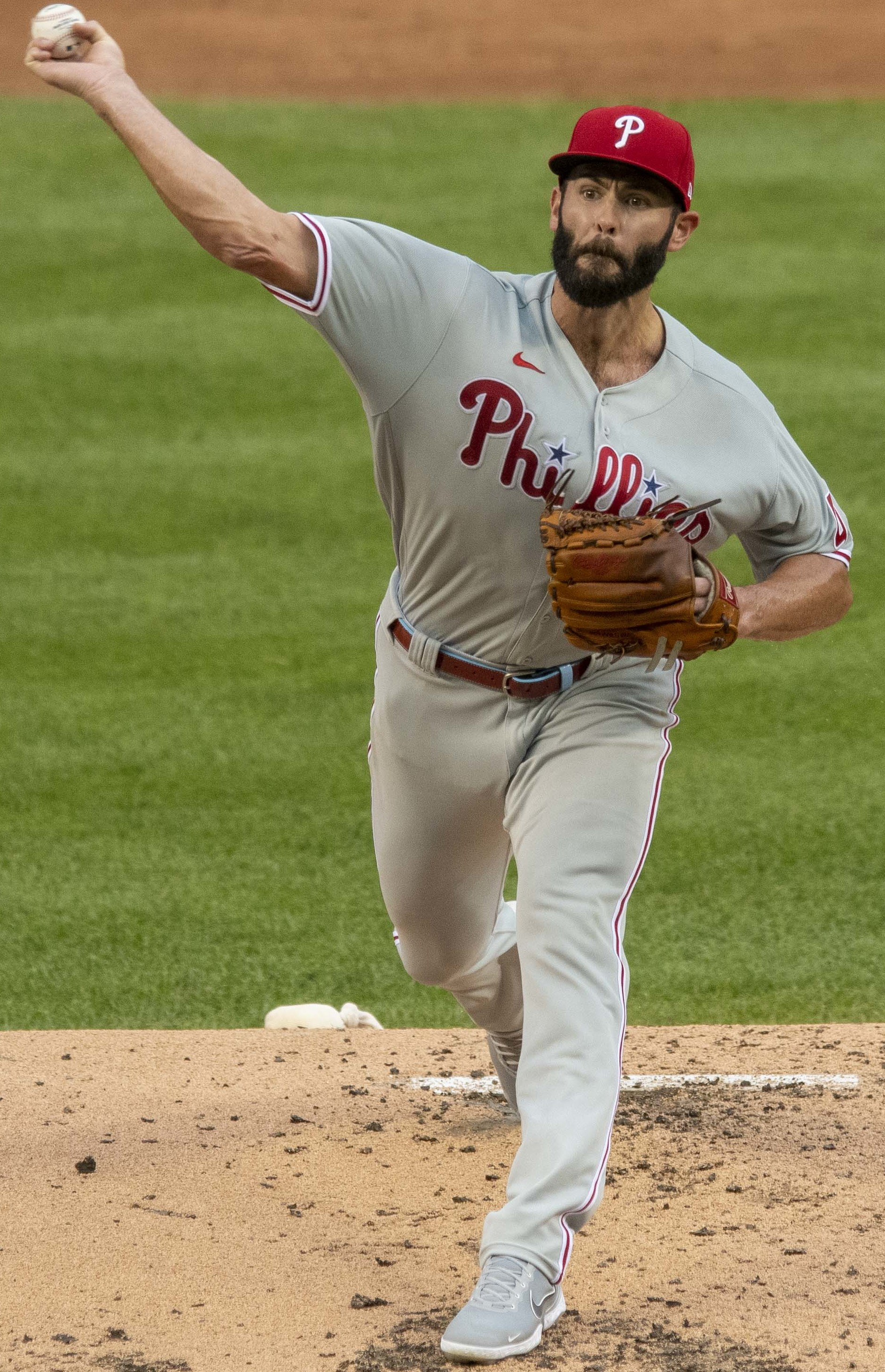
- Arrieta with the Philadelphia Phillies in 2020
- Pitcher
- Born: March 6, 1986 (age 40); Farmington, Missouri, U.S.
- Batted: Right Threw: Right

MLB debut
- June 10, 2010, for the Baltimore Orioles

Last MLB appearance
- September 19, 2021, for the San Diego Padres

MLB statistics
- Win–loss record: 115–93
- Earned run average: 3.98
- Strikeouts: 1,433
- Stats at Baseball Reference

Teams
- Baltimore Orioles (2010–2013); Chicago Cubs (2013–2017); Philadelphia Phillies (2018–2020); Chicago Cubs (2021); San Diego Padres (2021)

Career highlights and awards
- All-Star (2016); World Series champion (2016); NL Cy Young Award (2015); Silver Slugger Award (2016); MLB wins leader (2015); Pitched two no-hitters (2015, 2016)
Medals
Men's baseball
Representing United States
Olympic Games
Bronze medal – third place	2008 Beijing	Team
World University Championship
Gold medal – first place	2006 Havana	Team

Jacob Joseph Arrieta (born March 6, 1986) is an American former professional baseball pitcher. He played in Major League Baseball (MLB) for the Baltimore Orioles, Chicago Cubs, Philadelphia Phillies, and San Diego Padres.

Arrieta played college baseball at Weatherford Junior College and at Texas Christian University (TCU). He was an All-American and was named Mountain West Conference Pitcher of the Year at TCU. The Orioles selected Arrieta in the fifth round of the 2007 MLB draft, and he signed a then-record contract for a fifth-round draft pick. He pitched for the United States national baseball team at the 2008 Summer Olympics, winning the bronze medal.

Arrieta made his MLB debut for the Orioles in 2010, and after four seasons he was traded to the Cubs in 2013. In 2015, he led MLB in wins with 22, pitched a no-hitter, and won the 2015 National League Cy Young Award. In 2016, he was an NL All Star, threw his second no-hitter, received a Silver Slugger Award, and won a World Series with the Cubs.

Prior to the start of the 2018 season, Arrieta signed a three-year, $75 million contract with the Phillies. In August 2019, the team announced that he would have season-ending surgery to remove a bone spur in his pitching elbow. He returned to the starting rotation with the Phillies for the shortened 2020 season. In 2021, he returned to the Cubs, but was released partway through the season before signing with the San Diego Padres. Arrieta announced his retirement from professional baseball after the 2021 season.

== Early life ==
Arrieta was born in Farmington, Missouri, to Lou and Lynda Arrieta. They moved to Texas four months after Arrieta was born, and he grew up in Plano, Texas, where he attended Plano East Senior High School. He was 6–1 with a 1.61 earned-run average (ERA) as a junior, and 5–4 with a 1.30 ERA as a senior. As a high-school senior, he was selected by the Cincinnati Reds in the 31st round of the 2004 draft, but instead he chose to attend college.

== College career ==
Arrieta attended Weatherford Junior College for his freshman year in 2005, posting a 6–2 win–loss record with a 3.43 ERA. Following his freshman year, he was selected by the Milwaukee Brewers in the 26th round of the 2005 Major League Baseball draft.

Instead, he opted to transfer to Texas Christian University (TCU), where he played for the TCU Horned Frogs baseball team for his sophomore and junior seasons, and studied sport psychology. During the summer of 2005, prior to enrolling at TCU, Arrieta participated in summer collegiate baseball with the McKinney Marshalls of the Texas Collegiate League and posted a 4–3 record in 10 starts with a 1.87 ERA over 62 2/3 innings pitched. During his sophomore year in 2006, he led college baseball with 14 wins and had a 2.35 ERA over 19 appearances, and he had 111 strikeouts in 111 innings. He won the Mountain West Conference Pitcher of the Year award and was named a Second-Team College Baseball All-American after his sophomore year.

In 2007, his junior year, he was 9–3 with a 3.01 ERA. He was named first-team All-Mountain West in 2007.

Arrieta first joined the United States national baseball team in 2006 and helped the team win the World University Baseball Championship in Cuba. He was 4–0 with 34 strikeouts and a 0.27 ERA—allowing just one earned run in 35 innings pitched over six starts for the team. In his first start at the 2008 Summer Olympics in Beijing, Arrieta pitched six innings and struck out seven in Team USA's 9–1 victory over the China national baseball team.

== Professional career ==
=== Draft and minor leagues ===
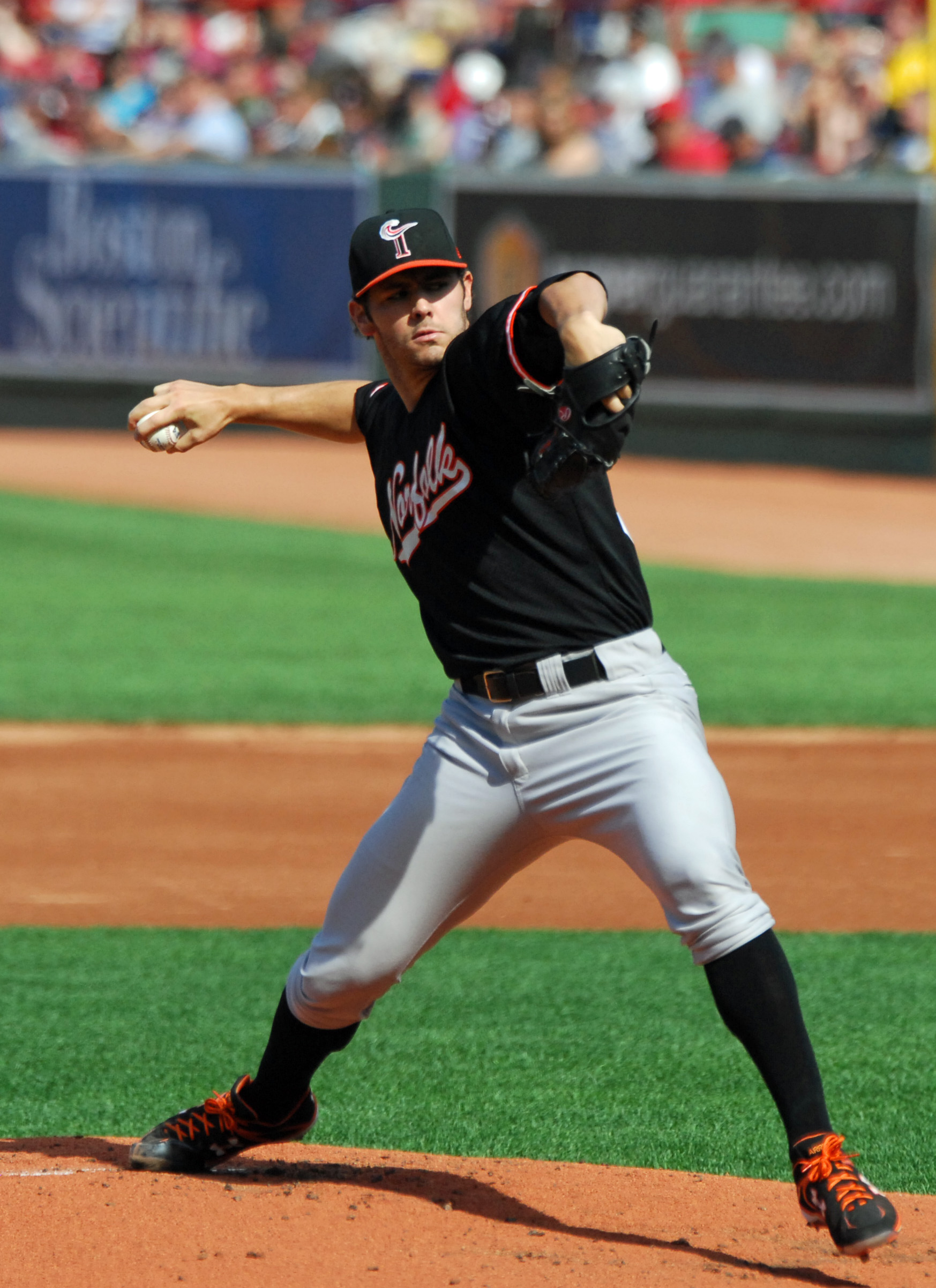
Arrieta pitching for the Norfolk Tides in 2009

The Baltimore Orioles selected Arrieta in the fifth round, 159th overall, of the 2007 MLB draft, and he joined the team on a signing bonus of $1.1 million, almost 10 times higher than the recommended bonus for a fifth-round pick. Because he signed with the team late, he was not eligible to play for a regular-season Minor League Baseball (MiLB) team and made his professional debut in the Arizona Fall League (AFL), where he was named a Preseason All-Star. He made an impression there by pitching 16 scoreless innings for the Phoenix Desert Dogs, keeping his walks plus hits per innings pitched (WHIP) below 1.00 for the AFL championship-winning team.

He opened the 2008 season with the Class A Frederick Keys of the Carolina League. MiLB pitching coach Blaine Beatty remembered Arrieta entering the season with a strong pitching repertoire, but struggling with the mental aspect of the game, particularly with maintaining his composure under duress. He made 20 starts for the Keys, going 6–5 in the process. Additionally, Arrieta served as the Keys' opening-day starter, received both midseason and postseason All-Star honors, and pitched in the All-Star Futures Game. He pitched a scoreless inning at the Futures Game, allowing only one hit and striking out one. Arrieta was also the only MiLB baseball player below Double-A to be named to the United States national baseball team for the 2008 Summer Olympics. He started in one game for the USA team, pitching six scoreless innings in a 9–1 group stage victory over China. Arrieta and the rest of Team USA ultimately took bronze in the Olympic tournament. Although he missed the final six weeks of the season due to the Olympics, Arrieta led the Carolina League with a 2.87 ERA, while his 120 strikeouts were fourth in the league. When he returned from Beijing, he was named the Carolina League Pitcher of the Year.

Arrieta received his first Orioles spring training invitation in 2009, although he was not expected to make his MLB debut that season. During spring training, he kept a personal blog that criticized the Orioles' training facilities, as well as the physical abilities of multiple teammates. One Oriole discovered this blog and printed out excerpts that he displayed around the clubhouse; this discovery caused friction between Arrieta and the rest of the team. He opened the regular season with the Double-A Bowie Baysox, posting a 6–3 record with a 2.59 ERA in 11 starts before receiving a promotion to the Triple-A Norfolk Tides on June 12. Although he took the loss in his 2–0 club debut against the Indianapolis Indians, Arrieta pitched six solid innings for Norfolk, allowing only two hits and one solo home run. He made 17 starts for Norfolk that season, posting a 5–8 record and a 3.93 ERA, while striking out 78 batters in 91 2/3 innings.

=== Baltimore Orioles (2010–2013) ===
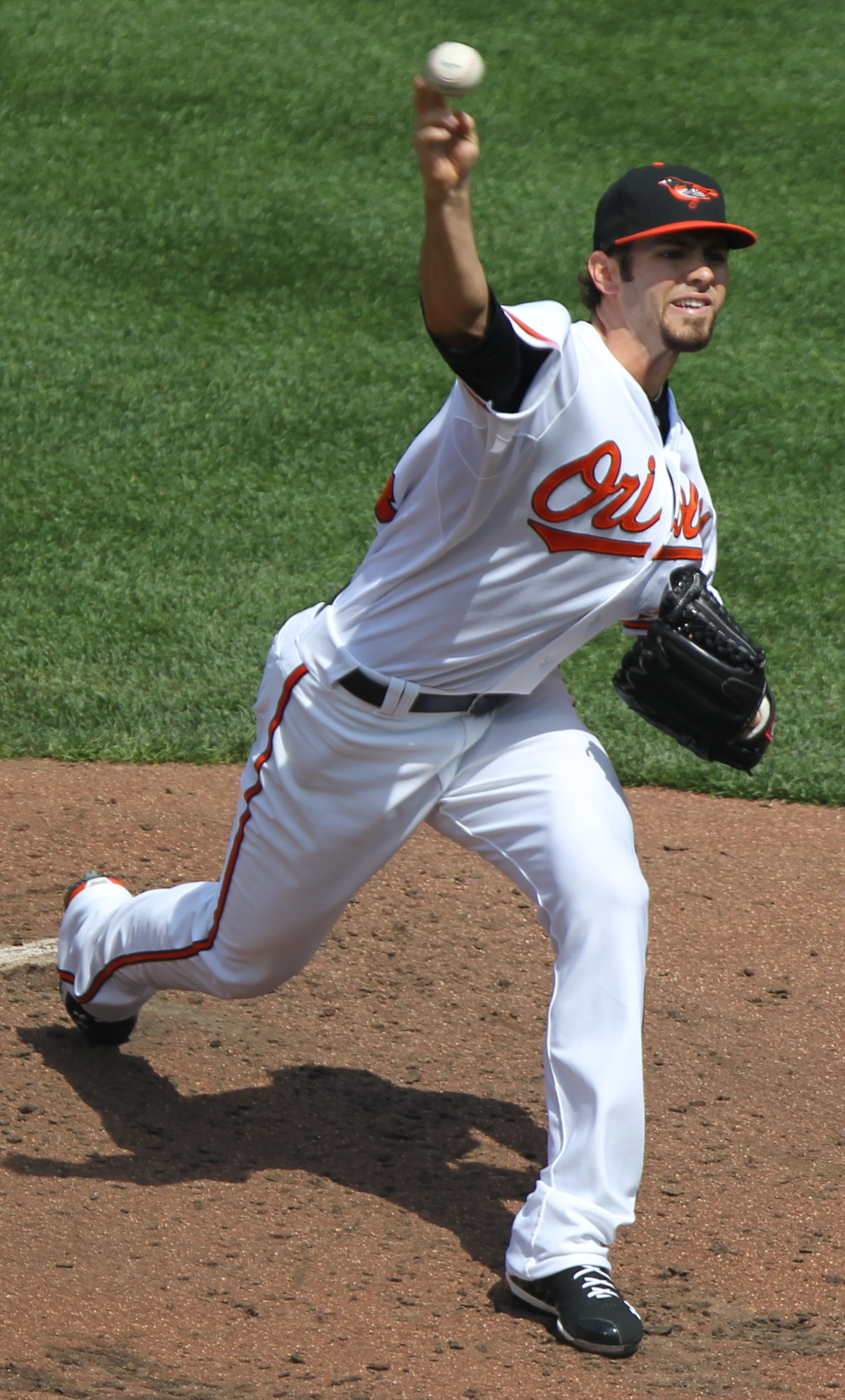
Arrieta pitching for the Orioles in 2011

Arrieta received another spring-training invitation in 2010, but he was assigned to the Tides on March 25, as Baltimore already had a complete starting rotation, and the club was not interested in having him start as a long reliever. Difficulties from Baltimore's starting rotation, however, forced the team to begin calling up minor-league pitchers by the end of May. Arrieta was one of the top choices to replace David Hernandez on May 25, but Chris Tillman received the promotion in his stead, as Tillman was already on the 40-man roster, which made a promotion logistically simpler. Arrieta received his chance shortly afterwards, replacing a struggling Brad Bergesen for a June 10 game against A. J. Burnett and the New York Yankees. Arrieta pitched for six innings in his debut, allowing three earned runs while striking out six to earn the win in Baltimore's 4–3 victory. When Buck Showalter took over as manager for the Orioles on August 3, Arrieta and the rest of the Baltimore rotation showed immediate improvement; after going 14–45 with a combined 5.50 ERA before Showalter, the rotation improved to 15–11 with a 3.23 ERA in the month after his hiring. On September 18, the Orioles decided to shut Arrieta down for the remainder of the season, both because a bone spur in his pitching elbow had led to triceps tightness in his last start and because he had pitched a career-high 173 1/3 innings between Norfolk and Baltimore. After going 6–2 with a 1.85 ERA in 12 minor-league games, Arrieta finished his rookie season 6–6 with a 4.66 ERA in 18 starts, having struck out 52 batters in 100 1/3 innings. After receiving a second medical opinion, he decided against an offseason surgery to remove the spur.

After securing his position in the Orioles' 2011 starting rotation, Arrieta made his season debut for the Orioles' home opener at Camden Yards on April 4. He allowed one earned run on six hits, while striking out three in six innings of the Orioles' 5–1 victory over the Detroit Tigers. He began the season as one of Baltimore's best starters, leading the team with nine wins in 18 starts, but some concern existed over his health and command; his ERA was 4.90 in that same time frame, he rarely lasted beyond six innings, and he frequently walked batters. Additionally, by early July, the bone spur in his elbow had begun to bother him again. He walked at least one batter per game until July 20, when he threw a career-high 111 pitches in seven innings against the Boston Red Sox. The fibrous mass in his elbow continued to affect his command, however, to the point where he walked a career-high six batters in a game against the Yankees. Arrieta underwent a season-ending surgery to remove the mass on August 12, and he finished his sophomore season with a 10–8 record and 5.05 ERA in 22 starts.

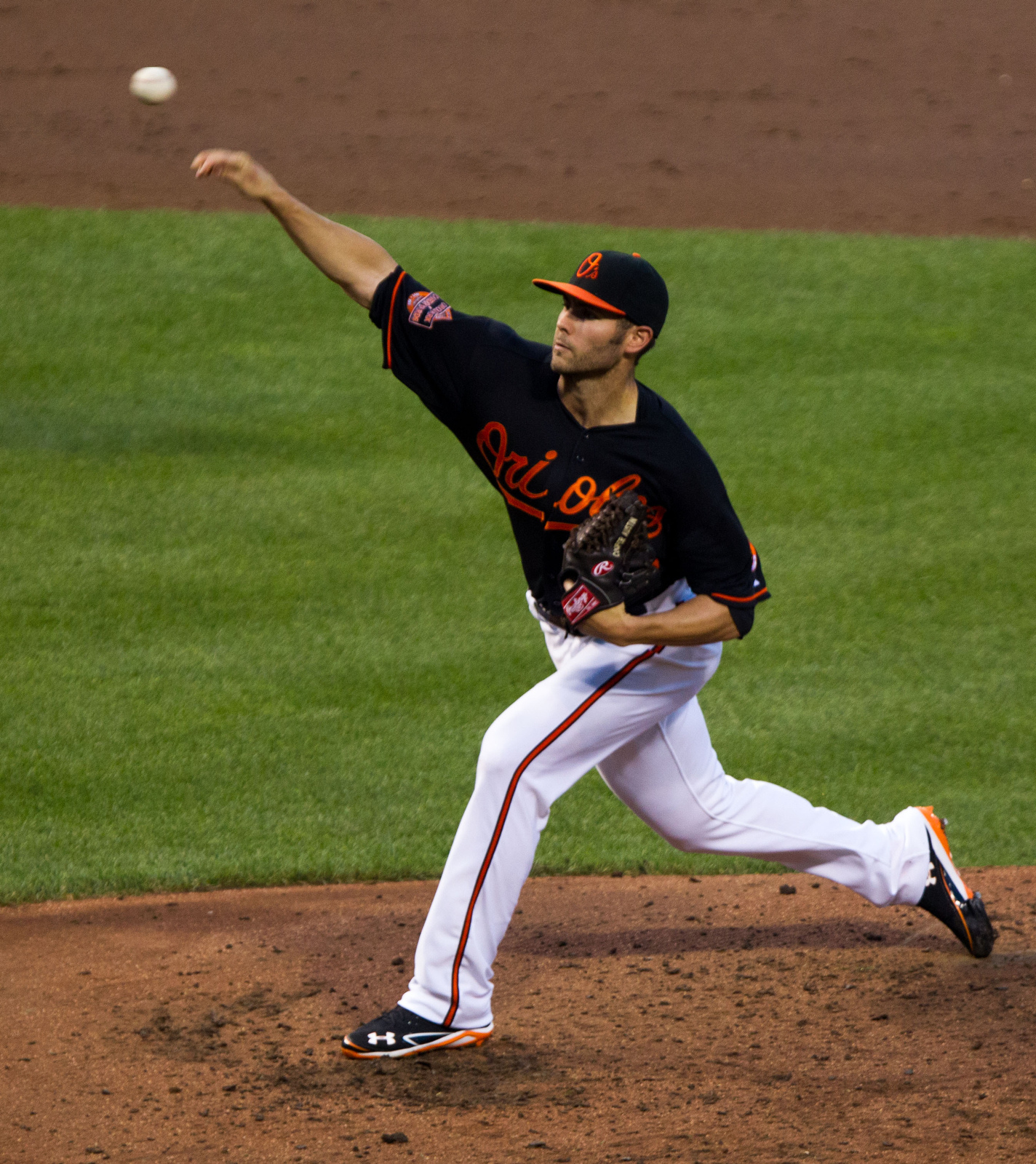
Arrieta pitching for the Orioles in 2012

When Jeremy Guthrie, who had been the Orioles' opening-day starting pitcher the last three seasons, was traded to the Colorado Rockies, Arrieta was selected to pitch the first game of Baltimore's 2013 season. He earned the win in the Orioles' 5–2 victory over the Minnesota Twins, allowing only two hits and striking out four batters in seven innings. Arrieta was far less successful as the season progressed, going 3–9 with a 6.13 ERA in 18 starts. He briefly spent time in the bullpen in June, but on July 6, after allowing six runs in 3 2/3 innings of a 9–7 loss to the Los Angeles Angels, Arrieta was demoted to the Triple-A Norfolk Tides. Manager Buck Showalter told reporters, "I think our guys understand that carrying around 6.00 ERAs in the American League just don't cut it". After an MiLB start in which he allowed five earned runs in 3 2/3 innings against the Gwinnett Stripers, Arrieta acquired a sport psychologist to aid in the mental aspect of his pitching. His performance improved in kind; Arrieta had a 5.75 ERA in his first six starts for Norfolk and a 1.82 ERA in his last four. In 10 starts for Norfolk, including one complete game, Arrieta went 5–4 with a 4.02 ERA. He was promoted back to Baltimore on September 7, and he made six more MLB appearances to close out the season, all of which came in relief. In 24 appearances for Baltimore, 18 of which were starts, Arrieta went 3–9 with a 6.20 ERA, and he struck out 109 batters in 114 2/3 innings. He dressed for the 2012 American League Division Series, but he was not on the active roster and did not appear in a game. The Orioles lost the series to the New York Yankees and were eliminated from the postseason.

Arrieta outpitched both Brian Matusz and Steve Johnson during spring training to win back a position in the Orioles' 2013 Opening Day starting rotation. He struggled with pitch command through his first four starts of the season, during which he went 1–1 with a 6.63 ERA, as well as 16 walks in 19 innings. On April 22, the Orioles demoted Arrieta to Triple-A and promoted right-handed reliever Alex Burnett in his stead. He spent the remainder of his time with the organization bouncing between Baltimore and Norfolk. In five starts for Baltimore across three major-league stints, Arrieta was 1–2 with a 7.23 ERA. He also made nine appearances for Norfolk, all but one of which were starts, and went 5–3 with a 4.41 ERA there.

=== Chicago Cubs (2013–2017) ===
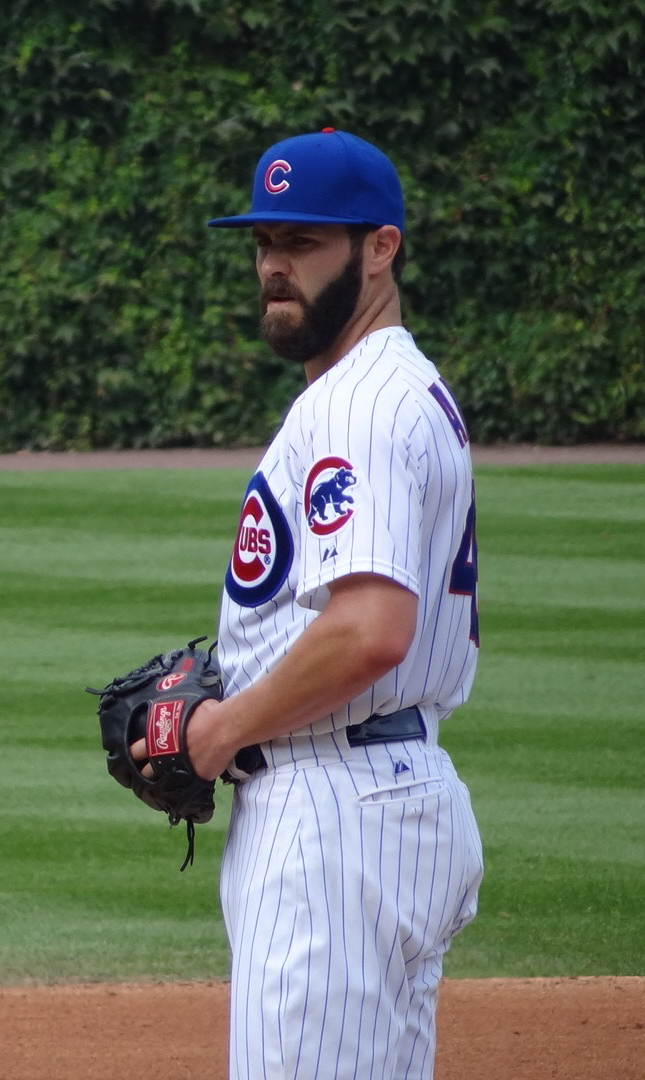
Arrieta with the Cubs in 2015

==== 2013–2014 ====
On July 2, 2013, the Orioles traded Arrieta and fellow pitcher Pedro Strop to the Chicago Cubs in exchange for starting pitcher Scott Feldman and catcher Steve Clevenger. The trade was met with criticism from members of the Cubs clubhouse, who were displeased with the decision to trade away Feldman, whose season by that point had been stronger than that of Strop and Arrieta. Arrieta, meanwhile, was assigned to the Triple-A Iowa Cubs to reclaim the command that had eluded him in Baltimore. He was first called up to Chicago for a spot start in the second game of a doubleheader against the Milwaukee Brewers, but did not join the Cubs full-time until August 14, when he replaced a struggling Carlos Villanueva in the rotation. Manager Dale Sveum had planned to call up Arrieta for the final stretch of the season to find him work with pitching coach Chris Bosio; rather than moving Chris Rusin from the rotation as planned, Villanueva was moved to the bullpen to make room for the new pitcher. He went 4–2 in nine starts for his first season in Chicago, recording a 3.66 ERA and 37 strikeouts in 51 2/3 innings. Additionally, in Iowa, Arrieta posted a 2–2 record with a 3.56 ERA and 39 strikeouts in seven starts and 30 1/3 innings.

Although he was named to the opening-day starting rotation, Arrieta missed the first month of the 2014 season with right shoulder tightness before he was activated on May 3. Once healthy, Arrieta showed an increased command of his slider and cut fastball, which made him more effective against right-handed batters. As a result, he went 4–0 in six starts during June, and his 0.92 ERA was the lowest of any Cubs pitcher in June since Rick Reuschel in 1977. After losing two no-hitter bids earlier in the season against the Cincinnati Reds and Boston Red Sox, Arrieta posted his first MLB complete-game shutout on September 16. The Cubs defeated the Reds 7–0, while Arrieta took a no-hitter into the eighth inning before allowing a double to Brandon Phillips. It was the only hit he allowed that game, giving him the team's first one-hit shutout since Jon Lieber in 2001. Arrieta finished the season with a 10–5 record and 2.53 ERA in 25 starts, and he struck out 167 batters in 156 2/3 innings.

==== 2015: Cy Young Award ====
On July 12, 2015, Arrieta pitched a complete-game victory over the Chicago White Sox at Wrigley Field, his second of the season and the third of his major-league career. On August 20, he became the first MLB pitcher to win 15 games in the 2015 season. Ten days later, Arrieta no-hit the Los Angeles Dodgers at Dodger Stadium for the 14th no-hitter in Cubs history. He struck out 12 batters, including all three batters he faced in both the first and ninth innings. Sandy Koufax had been the last pitcher to complete a no-hitter by striking out all three batters he faced in the ninth inning, doing so against the Cubs in his 1965 perfect game—which also was played at Dodger Stadium. Arrieta was named the NL Player of the Week for August 24–30 and NL Pitcher of the Month for August with a 6–0 and a 0.43 ERA and the no-hitter. The right-hander held opposing hitters to a .130 batting average and a .196 on-base percentage in August and struck out 43 batters while walking just 10. On September 22, Arrieta won his 20th game of the season, throwing a three-hitter against the Brewers. With 11 more strikeouts in that 4–0 Cubs victory at Wrigley, he was the first MLB pitcher to win 20 games this season and had his fourth complete game and third shutout of the season.

After the 2015 All-Star break, he gave up 9 earned runs during 15 starts over 107 1/3 innings for a 0.75 ERA, the lowest in MLB history in the second half. On October 5, he was again named NL Pitcher of the Month for his 4–0 September record with a 0.45 ERA.

For the season, Arrieta's 22–6 record and 1.77 ERA (second in the NL) made him only the fifth pitcher to win at least 22 games with no more than six losses and a sub-2.00 ERA since the earned run became an official statistic in 1913. Arrieta's 2015 season has been widely compared to Bob Gibson's 1968 season in which Gibson won the National League MVP and Cy Young Awards after posting a live-ball era-record 1.12 ERA. He led thee MLB in wins, complete games (4), and shutouts (3), and led the National League in hits per 9 innings pitched (5.895) and games started (33). He also led the majors in lowest home runs per nine innings (0.39). His .786 win–loss percentage and his 0.865 walks-plus-hits per innings pitched were second in the NL.

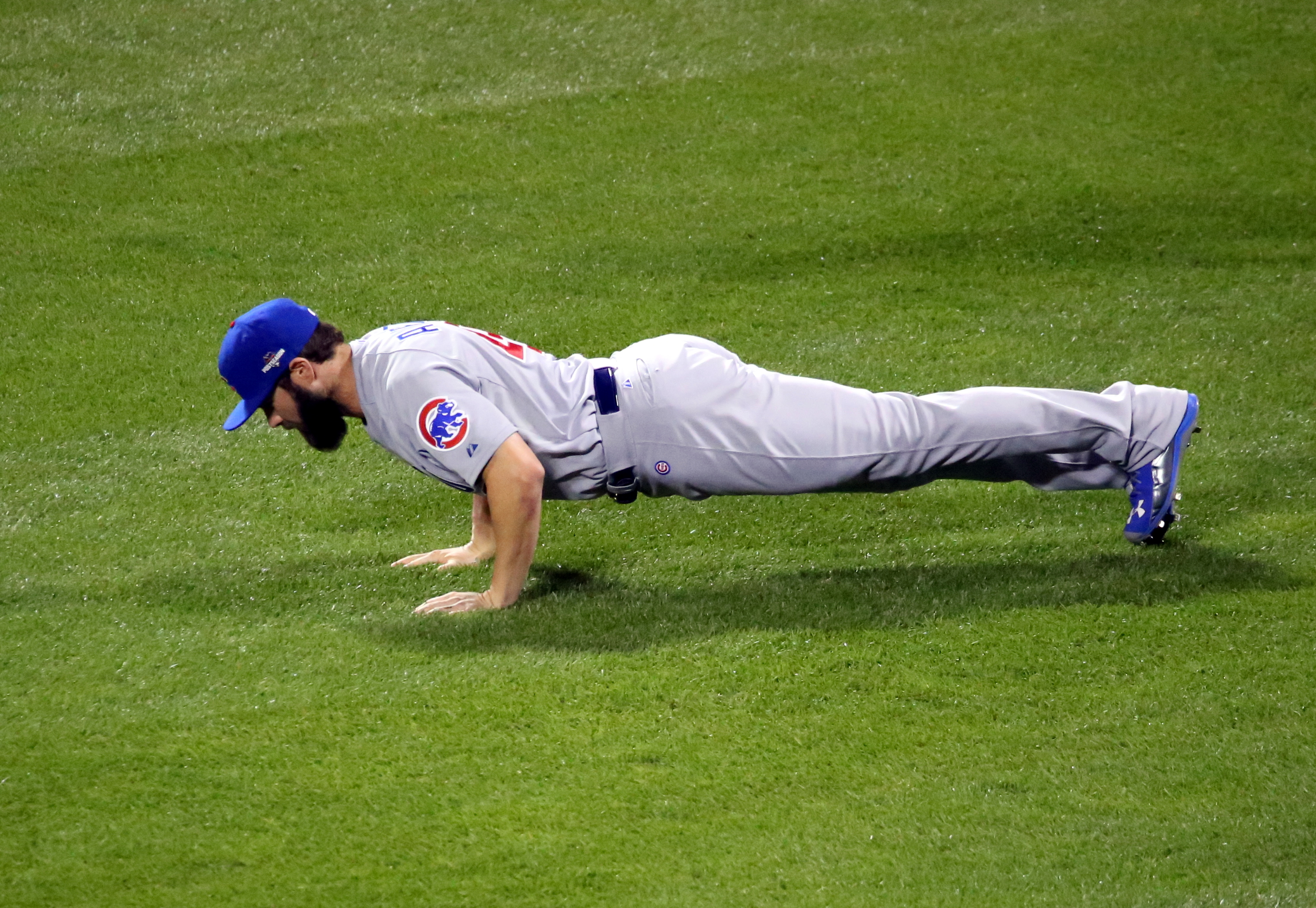
Jake Arrieta does pushups before his start in game 2 of the 2015 NLCS.

Arrieta started the 2015 National League Wild Card Game. He pitched a complete-game shutout, striking out 11 batters and allowing only four hits to defeat the Pittsburgh Pirates 4–0. He became the first pitcher to post a postseason shutout while striking out at least 10 batters and walking zero. He is also the first pitcher to have more stolen bases than runs allowed in a postseason game when he stole second base in the top of the 7th inning. Arrieta was the pitcher of record in the game-2 loss of the 2015 National League Championship Series to the New York Mets.

Arrieta won the NL Cy Young Award to become the first Cubs pitcher to do so since Greg Maddux in 1992. He was the fifth Cubs winner overall, also joining Fergie Jenkins (1971), Bruce Sutter (1979), and Rick Sutcliffe (1984). He also came in sixth in the voting for 2015 NL Most Valuable Player Award.

==== 2016: World Series championship ====
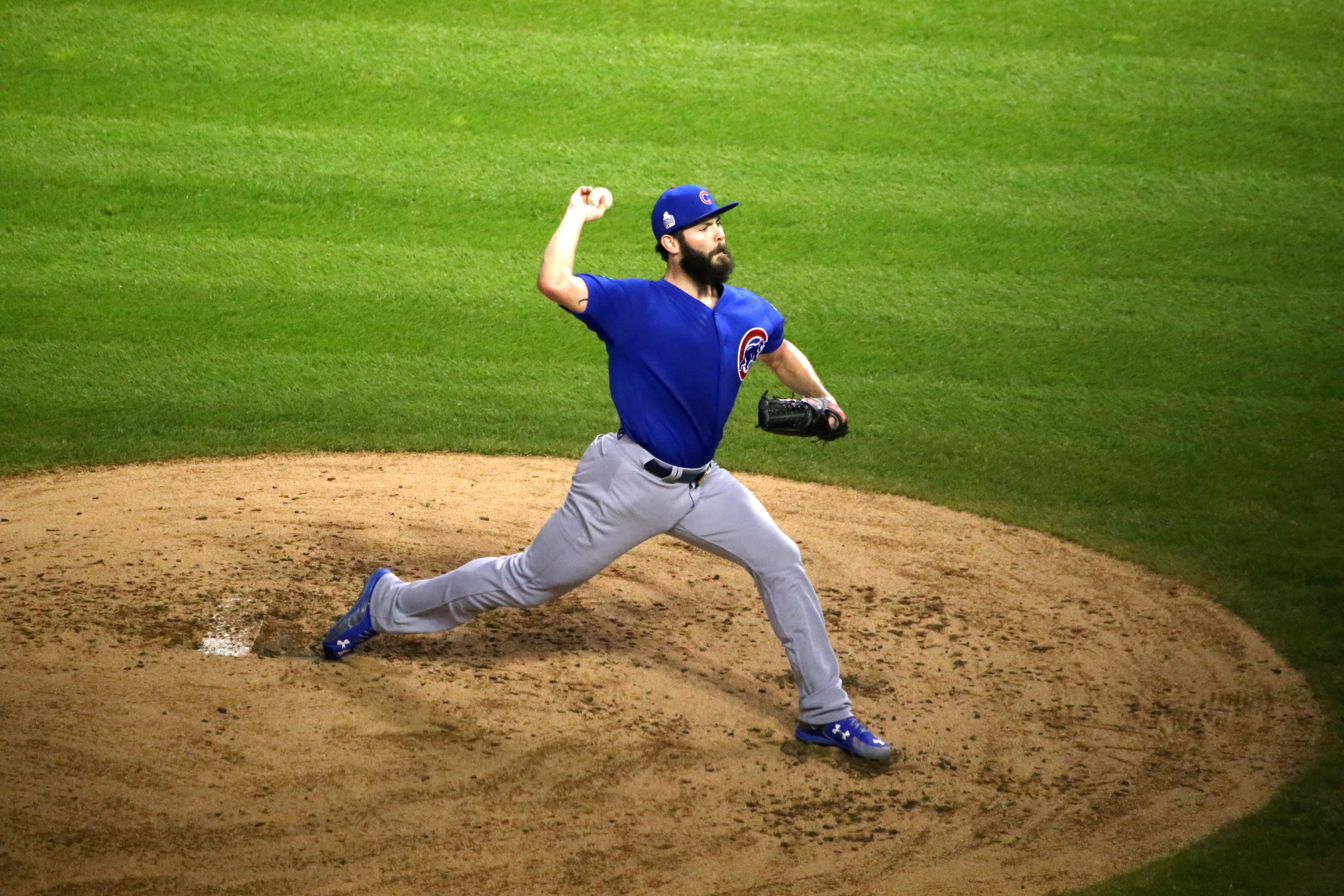
Arrieta pitching in Game 6 of the 2016 World Series

On February 5, 2016, Arrieta and the Cubs agreed on a record arbitration deal worth $10.7 million 2016 salary, the largest one-year contract for a second-time arbitration-eligible pitcher, topping David Price's $10.1 million salary in 2013. The club chose him as the 2016 season opening-day starting pitcher against the Angels on April 4.

On April 21, Arrieta pitched his second career no-hitter and the 15th no-hitter in Cubs history against the Cincinnati Reds in a 16–0 blowout win. He walked four and struck out six. Arrieta, who at the time of the no-hitter had not recorded a loss in his previous 17 regular-season starts, became only the second MLB pitcher ever to go unbeaten in regular-season play between no-hitters, with the only other being Johnny Vander Meer, who threw consecutive no-hitters in 1938. The Arizona Diamondbacks defeated Arrieta and the Cubs 3–2 on June 5, even with 12 strikeouts in his first five innings, stopping a 20-game regular-season winning streak and giving him his first loss in 11 months.

In 2016, he was 18–8 with a 3.10 ERA (10th in the NL) in 197 1/3 innings. He led the league for the second consecutive year with 6.294 hits per 9 innings pitched, his 18 wins were third in the league, his .692 win–loss percentage was sixth, his 1.084 walks-plus-hits per innings pitched and 0.730 home runs per 9 innings pitched were seventh, his 190 strikeouts and 197 1/3 innings pitched were eighth, and his 8.666 strikeouts per 9 innings pitched were 10th. He won a Silver Slugger Award after batting .262/.304/.415 with 2 home runs and 7 Run batted in in 65 at bats, and came in ninth in voting for the 2016 NL Cy Young Award.

In game 3 of the 2016 NLDS, Arrieta hit a three-run home run off of San Francisco Giants' pitcher Madison Bumgarner, the first time that a pitcher hit a home run off Bumgarner, which ended Bumgarner's consecutive playoff scoreless-innings streak of over 24 innings. Arrieta won games 2 and 6 of the 2016 World Series. The Cubs won game 7 of the series 8–7 in 10 innings, giving them their first World Series title after a 108-year drought.

==== 2017 ====
On January 13, 2017, he agreed to a contract for the 2017 baseball season. He was NL Pitcher of the Month in August.

In 2017, Arrieta made 30 starts with a 14–10 record and a 3.53 ERA (eighth in the National League) in 168 1/3 innings. He threw 14 wild pitches, tied for most in the National League, his 10 hits-by-pitch were fifth in the NL, and his 8.020 hits per 9 innings pitched and 1.218 walks-plus-hits per 9 innings pitched were 10th in the league. The Cubs finished the season 92–70 and clinched another NL Central division title.

Arrieta started game 4 of the 2017 NLDS, and after 90 pitches, left in the fourth inning trailing 1–0. The Cubs and Arrieta lost that game to the Washington Nationals, but won game 5 and moved on to the 2017 NLCS. After three losses and facing elimination, Arrieta was the starter and winning pitcher in a game-4 victory against the Dodgers. After the Cubs' season ended in a game-5 loss to the Dodgers, he declined the Cubs' $17.4 million qualifying offer and became a free agent for the first time in his career.

=== Philadelphia Phillies (2018–2020) ===
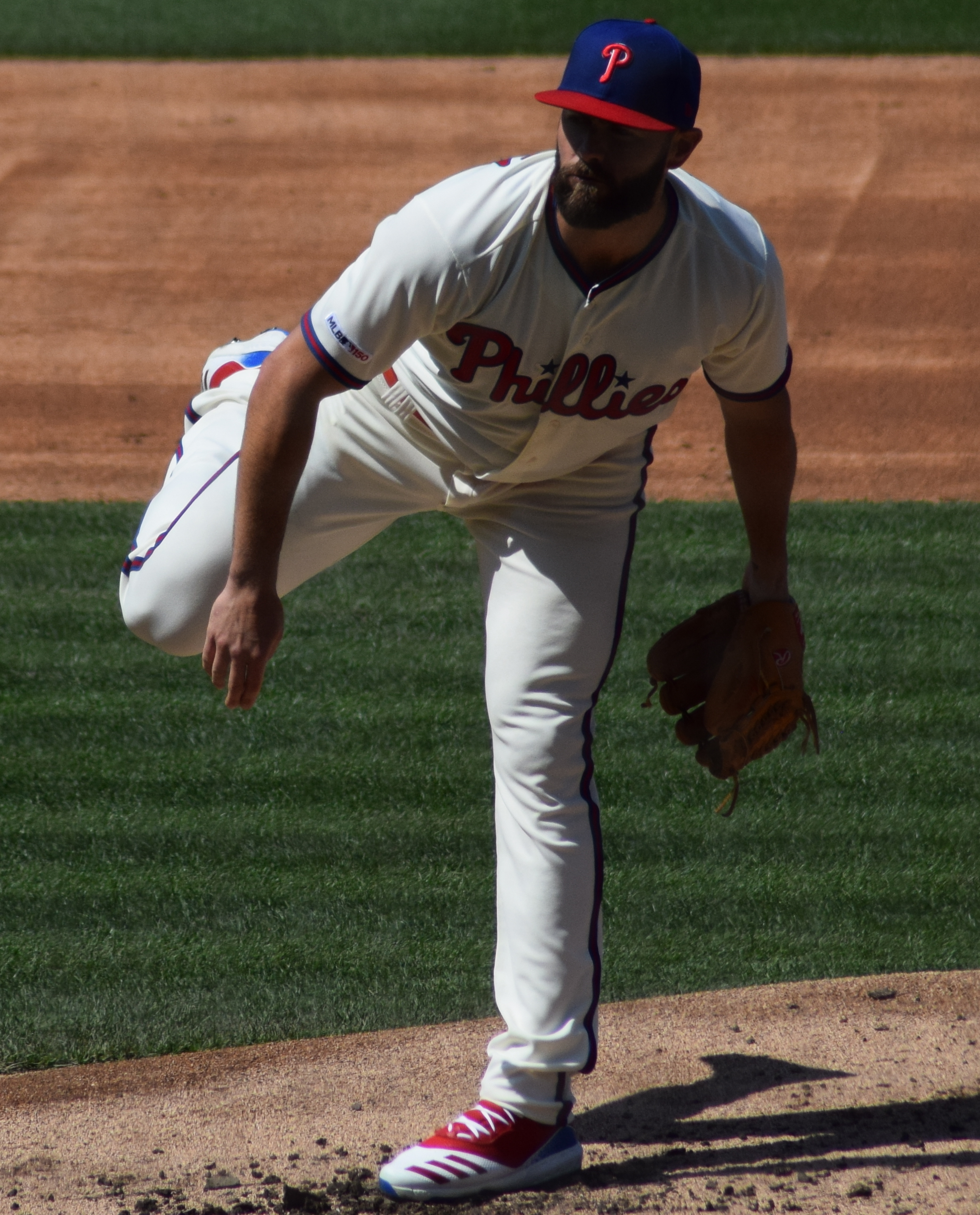
Arrieta with the Phillies in 2019

On March 11, 2018, shortly before opening day, the Philadelphia Phillies signed Arrieta to a three-year, $70 million contract with additional options of up to $135 million over five years. The late signing prevented Arrieta from being named to the opening-day 25-man roster, as he required additional training time with the Class A-Advanced Clearwater Threshers, but he opened the season shortly afterwards with a start against the Miami Marlins on April 8. Despite a career-low 6.2 strikeouts per nine innings (K/9), down from his 9.3 high in 2015, Arrieta posted an ERA of 0.90 in May 2018 by generating weak-contact ground balls for easy outs. This strategy was short-lived; the following month, Arrieta went 0–4 with a 6.66 ERA, telling reporters, "The ball is getting hit. That's it. Making mistakes, too many mistakes, especially against an aggressive, a good lineup." After one game that the Phillies lost 6–1 to the San Francisco Giants, Arrieta criticized his teammates for their poor defense, especially on infield shifts. He targeted Scott Kingery in particular for not moving quickly enough on the ball that ultimately set up Andrew McCutchen for a three-run home run. Arrieta was also frustrated with himself as the season went on, mostly because he could not explain why his pitching suddenly faltered. He finished the season 10–11 with a 3.96 ERA in 31 starts, with 138 strikeouts in 172 2/3 innings.

Following the 2018 season, Arrieta revealed that he had injured his knee in June, and that he had chosen to pitch through the pain, hiding the injury from his teammates and from manager Gabe Kapler. After reinjuring his knee during an offseason workout, Arrieta discovered that he had suffered a meniscus tear, and he underwent surgery in January to repair the joint. Believing himself healthy and with an improved arm angle while pitching leading into the 2019 MLB season, Arrieta captured his 100th career win on April 12, pitching seven innings of the Phillies' 9–1 rout of the Miami Marlins. By July 7, however, Arrieta seemed mired in a slump, with a 6.63 ERA through his last seven starts. On August 17, Arrieta and the Phillies announced that the pitcher would undergo a season-ending surgery to remove a bone spur in his pitching elbow. The spur had been causing pain over Arrieta's last seven starts of the year, limiting him to fewer than six innings per outing. By the time his season ended, Arrieta was 8–8 with a 4.64 ERA in 24 starts for the Phillies, and he struck out 110 batters in 135 2/3 innings.

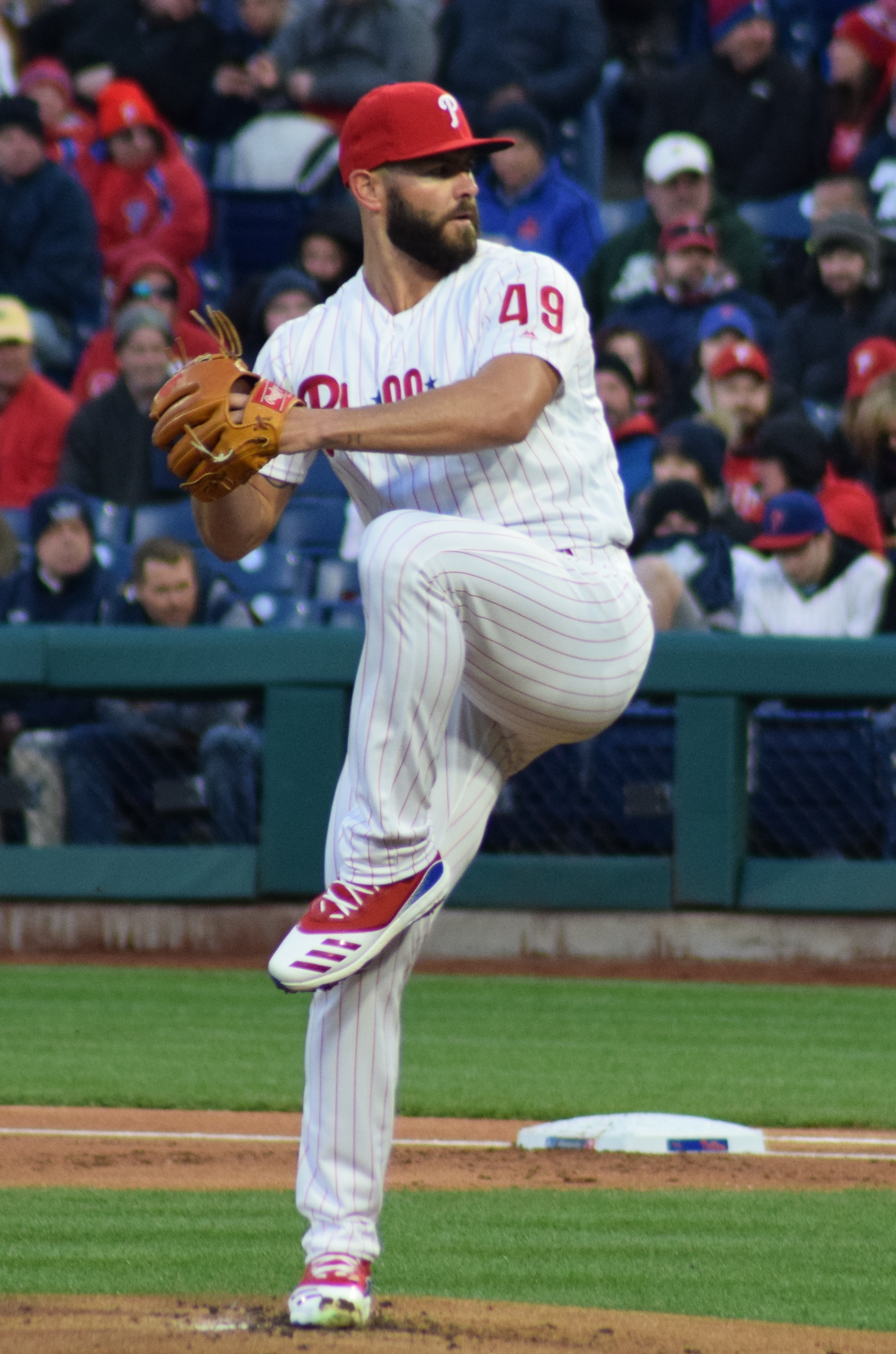
Arrieta with the Phillies in 2019

Entering spring training in 2020, Arrieta declared himself "100 percent healthy" and was confident that he would be able to perform during the regular season. The COVID-19 pandemic, which shortened the 2020 MLB season to only 60 regular-season games, proved an added challenge for Arrieta, who was entering the final year of his contract with the Phillies. Rather than having 30 starts to prove himself to the free market crowd as expected, the shortened schedule meant that starters like Arrieta would only expect to see around 10 games of action. He opened the season as the Phillies' number-three starter, behind Nola and recent acquisition Zack Wheeler. Two positive COVID-19 tests in the Phillies clubhouse shut the team down for one week, and Arrieta did not receive his first start of the season until August 3, his first MLB appearance in nearly one year. He allowed three runs in five innings of a 6–3 loss to the Yankees. Arrieta remained healthy until September 15, when he was shut down for the season with a hamstring injury. In nine starts for the Phillies, he posted a 4–4 record and a 5.08 ERA. Philadelphia chose not to extend his contract at the end of the season, leaving him a free agent.

=== Return to Chicago (2021) ===
On February 17, 2021, Arrieta rejoined the Cubs on a one-year, $4 million contract. After spending spring training tweaking his pitching delivery, Arrieta opened the season as Chicago's number-two starter, behind Kyle Hendricks. Arrieta's return to the Cubs was marred by injury. First, he suffered a cut on his right thumb on April 30 during a game against the Reds; after giving up seven runs in 3 1/3 innings, Arrieta was removed from the game and was placed on the 10-day injured list. On June 4, he attempted to play through a bout of gastroenteritis and proceeded to allow six runs in two innings of an 8–5 loss to the Giants. As the season progressed, Cubs management began to voice concerns about Arrieta's pitch command and durability; not once in his first 13 starts of the year did he remain on the mound past the fifth inning. On July 5, Arrieta faced the Phillies for the first time since leaving the team. He threw only 55 pitches across 1 2/3 innings, allowing seven runs in the process, including a first-inning grand slam to outfielder Andrew McCutchen. The Cubs unconditionally released Arrieta on August 12, the day after he allowed seven runs on eight hits in one inning against the Milwaukee Brewers. He posted a 5–11 record with a 6.88 ERA during his second stint with the Cubs.

=== San Diego Padres (2021) ===
Four days after his release from the Cubs, Arrieta signed a minor-league contract with the San Diego Padres, whose starting rotation had been depleted by injuries to Chris Paddack and Yu Darvish. He made his first start for the team on August 18, allowing five earned runs in 3 1/3 innings before departing with a hamstring injury. The injury caused Arrieta to miss 10 games on the injured list; three starts later, on September 19, he departed a game against the St. Louis Cardinals in the first inning with a right adductor magnus muscle strain. He faced only six batters and allowed five runs on two hits and a walk. Arrieta was designated for assignment on September 21. In only four starts for the Padres, he recorded a 10.95 ERA, allowing 15 earned runs in 12 1/3 innings. He was released the following day.

=== Retirement ===
On April 18, 2022, Arrieta announced his retirement from professional baseball on the Barstool Sports podcast "Pardon My Take", saying, "I haven't signed the papers, but I'm done ... At some point, the uniform goes to somebody else, and it's just my time." He finished his career with a 115–93 record and a 3.98 ERA in 285 games, all but six of which were starts, across 12 seasons. Arrieta struck out 1,433 batters while walking 571 and allowing 713 earned runs in 1,612 1/3 career innings pitched.

== Pitching style ==
During his MLB career, Arrieta threw five different kinds of pitches - a four-seam fastball, a sinker, a changeup, a slider, and a curveball. During 2015 and 2016, his two most dominant seasons, Arrieta's most effective pitch was a cross between a slider and a cut fastball. He described the pitch as taking on more of a cutter shape towards right-handed batters, while leaning towards a slider for left-handed opponents. The hybrid pitch proved effective in inducing strikeouts; in the first three weeks of the 2016 season, Arrieta struck out 17 batters in 80 at bats where his last pitch was the slider/cutter. Later in his career, Arrieta struggled with decreasing velocity on most of his repertoire; between 2015 and 2021, his sinker dropped from 95.3 mph (153.4 km/h) to 91.2 mph (146.8 km/h), while his slider fell from 90.8 mph (146.1 km/h) to 88.1 mph (141.8 km/h). To combat this decreased velocity, Arrieta increased his use of breaking balls to confuse hitters, while also relying on a sinking fastball to keep pitches low to the ground and playable for fielders.

== Personal life ==
Arrieta and his wife, gymnast Brittany Arrieta, have known each other since elementary school, and they began dating during their junior year of high school. They have two children together, a son, Cooper, and a daughter, Palmer. The family lives in Austin, Texas, where they are frequent hikers. Arrieta took up Pilates in 2013 and began incorporating it into his everyday workouts when he saw an improvement in his pitching.

Politically, Arrieta does not identify with either the Democratic or Republican political parties, and he did not vote in the 2016 United States presidential election. When the Cubs visited the White House to meet with then-President of the United States Barack Obama after their World Series victory in 2016, Arrieta clarified that his absence was not for political reasons, but due to the needs of his family. Despite making those claims, Arrieta publicly posted on Twitter on November 9, 2016 after Donald Trump's victory "Time for Hollywood to pony up and head for the border #illhelpyoupack #beatit". In 2021, Arrieta voiced his skepticism towards the COVID-19 vaccine, referencing the fact that several members of the New York Yankees tested positive for the virus despite being vaccinated. That May, he told reporters that he doubted the need to vaccinate as long as other COVID-19 safety guidelines were being followed.

Outside of baseball, Arrieta has made several television appearances. In the "Baseball" episode of the HBO comedy series Veep, protagonist Selina Meyer meets several members of the Orioles, including Arrieta and teammate Tommy Hunter. In 2017, Arrieta and Cubs teammate Kris Bryant appeared in an episode of Chicago Fire that focuses on a young Cubs fan injured in a car accident.

== Accomplishments and awards ==
Award/honor	Date	Ref
Major League accomplishments & awards
Chicago Cubs Opening Day starting pitcher	April 4, 2016	
National League Cy Young Award	2015	
MLB Wins Leader	2015	
Pitched a no-hitter	August 30, 2015; April 21, 2016	
National League Pitcher of the Month	2015 (August & September); 2016 (April); 2017 (August)	
National League Player of the Week	2015 (July 6–12, August 24–30, & September 21–27)	
Baltimore Orioles Opening Day starting pitcher	April 5, 2012	
Minor League accomplishments & awards
Eastern League Pitcher of the Week	2009 (May 18–24 & June 8–14)	
All-Star Futures Game	2008	
Carolina League Pitcher of the Year	2008	
Carolina League Postseason All-Star	2008	
Carolina League Mid-Season All-Star	2008	
Carolina League Pitcher of the Week	2008 (May 12–18 & May 26 – June 1)	
Arizona Fall League All-Prospect Team	2007	
College Baseball Accomplishments & Awards
Baseball America Second-Team All-American	2006	
NCBWA second-team All-American	2006	
NCAA Division I baseball Wins leader	2006	
Mountain West Conference Co-Pitcher of the Year	2006	
First-team All-Mountain West	2006 & 2007	
Mountain West Conference Pitcher of the Week	2006 (Feb. 13–19, May 8–14, May 22–28)	
Houston College Classic All-Tournament team	2006	
Other
Best Breakthrough Athlete ESPY Award	2016	

== See also ==
- Chicago Cubs award winners and league leaders
- List of Chicago Cubs no-hitters
- List of Major League Baseball annual shutout leaders
- List of Major League Baseball no-hitters
- List of Olympic medalists in baseball
- List of Texas Christian University alumni
- List of World Series starting pitchers

Sporting positions
Preceded by Jeremy Guthrie	Baltimore Orioles Opening Day starting pitcher 2012	Succeeded by Jason Hammel
Preceded by Jon Lester	Chicago Cubs Opening Day starting pitcher 2016	Succeeded by Jon Lester
Achievements
Preceded by Clayton Kershaw	National League Pitcher of the Month; August–September 2015; April 2016	Succeeded by Kyle Hendricks; Iván Nova
Preceded by Aramis Ramírez; A. J. Pollock; Stephen Strasburg	National League Player of the Week; July 6–12, 2015; August 24–30, 2015; September 21–7, 2015	Succeeded by Zack Greinke; Bartolo Colón; Max Scherzer
Preceded by Mike Fiers; Max Scherzer	No-hitter pitcher August 30, 2015; April 21, 2016	Succeeded by Max Scherzer; Edinson Vólquez
