= United Remnant Band of the Shawnee Nation =

Native American tribal organization

- Abbreviation: URB
- Predecessor: Shawnee Nation United Remnant Band
- Successor: Zane Shawnee Caverns
- Formation: 1971
- Founder: Hawk Pope
- Founded at: Bellefontaine, Ohio
- Tax ID no.: 31-0952858
- Purpose: Christian (X20), Church; Cultural, Ethnic Awareness (A23)
- Headquarters: Bellefontaine, Ohio
- Location: United States Ohio
- Official language: English
- Executive officer: Lukas Peshewa Pope
- Revenue: $70,113 (2022)
- Expenses: $43,100 (2022)
- Staff: 0 (2022)

The United Remnant Band of the Shawnee Nation, also called the Shawnee Nation, United Remnant Band (URB), is an organization that self-identifies as a Native American tribe in Ohio. Its members identify as descendants of Shawnee people. In 2016, the organization incorporated as a church.

Three federally recognized tribes of Shawnee are based in Oklahoma.

== Status ==
Despite using the word nation in its name, the group is neither a federally recognized tribe nor a state-recognized tribe. Ohio has no office to manage Indian affairs and no state-recognized tribes.

In 1979 and 1980, the Ohio state legislature held hearings about state recognition of the United Remnant Band. The band filed historical and genealogical documents with the state to support their claim of descent from the historical Shawnee.

The Ohio General Assembly held hearings and heard testimony from numerous groups. In 1980, the 113th Ohio General Assembly passed a "Joint Resolution to recognize the Shawnee Nation United Remnant Band", as adopted by the Ohio Senate, 113th General Assembly, Regular Session, Am. Sub. H.J.R. No. 8, 1979–1980. This is a congratulatory resolution, and Ohio attorney general's office spokesperson Leo Jennings said: "The resolution has no force of law in the state Ohio.… It was basically a ceremonial resolution."

A former URB member Dark Rain Thom says she tried to help the United Remnant Band of Shawnee gain recognition in the 1970s and 1980s but has since joined another unrecognized organization, the East of the River Shawnee.

At least 35 groups in Ohio claim to have Shawnee descent, such as the Vinyard Indian Settlement, but "Ohio has no state recognized tribes nor does it have a recognition process," wrote Mary Annette Pember (Red Cliff Ojibwe).

== Nonprofit organizations ==
In 1971, residents of Ohio organized the United Remnant Band of the Shawnee Nation as a 501(C)(3) nonprofit organization. Until his death in 2015, Jerry L. "Hawk" Pope led the URB for more than 40 years.

In 2016, the IRS accepted Shawnee Nation, United Remnant Band as a church in the state of Ohio. Jack "Eagle" Lewis" served on the organization's board of directors in 2008.

Currently, the nonprofit is named Zane Shawnee Caverns, a Christian 501(c)(3) organization. The Tides Foundation donated $150,000 to the organization in 2021.

The nonprofit's administration in 2022–23 was:

- Tribal chief, business chief, executive officer: Lukas Peshewa Pope
- Nation's mother, business assistant, secretary-treasurer (12/31/2022): Beverly Nightwind Isaacs
- Clan mother, business secretary-treasurer (04/11/2022): Lacy Little Bear Pope

=== Membership ===
The Shawnee Nation, URB states that the organization requires people to trace their lineage and document at least one-eighth Shawnee ancestry (the equivalent of one great-grandparent), or one-16th if the person is a child "of a provable person."

== Activities ==
=== Properties ===
In 1989 the URB purchased 110 acres near Urbana, Ohio. In 1989 the URB purchased 20 acres of land, three miles (6.4 km) south of Urbana, Ohio.

In 1995 the URB purchased the Zane Caverns and an associated museum, between Zanesfield and Bellefontaine, Ohio. In total they have bought 330 acres in four counties. They renamed 100-acre (0.40 km^{2}) campground, museum, gift shop, caverns, and surrounding property as the Zane Shawnee Caverns and Southwind Park.

The museum in Bellefontaine was expanded and renamed as the George Drouillard Museum, for George Drouillard (Shawnee, 1773–1810), an interpreter and hunter who was a part of Lewis and Clark Expedition (1804–1806).

=== Coins ===
The US Mint contracted with the United Remnant Band to sew pouches for special sets of the 2004 Lewis & Clark Bicentennial silver dollar but was informed by the Indian Arts and Crafts Board that "the Shawnee Nation United Remnant Band of Ohio does not meet the legal requirements to produce and market authentic 'Indian' products under the Indian Arts and Crafts Act." Under IACA, only members of federally or state-recognized tribes can sell their artwork as "Native American made" or "Indian made". The Mint refunded money that customers spent on the pouches made by URB.

== Notable members ==
- Robert W. Russell, pen name Nas'Naga (1941–2021), poet and novelist from Ohio
