= Zane Shawnee Caverns =

Cave system in Jefferson Township, Ohio, U.S.

The Zane Shawnee Caverns is a cave system in Jefferson Township, Logan County, Ohio, United States. The caverns are show caves owned by the nonprofit United Remnant Band of the Shawnee Nation as of 1995.

These caverns are located between Zanesfield and Bellefontaine, Ohio, near the Ohio Caverns. Both cave systems were formed by the same glacial process which deposited moraine upon nearby Campbell Hill.

== History and site features ==
The land adjacent to Zane Shawnee Caverns was historically used as a thoroughfare by the Shawnee, as it provided a portage between the Great Miami River and the rivers feeding into Lake Erie (particularly the Maumee River). The caverns were not generally known until they were discovered in 1892, when John Dunlap rescued a boy and a dog from a sinkhole. The caverns were named the Zane Caverns, after the nearby village of Zanesfield. The caverns were operated privately as a show cave throughout most of the 20th century.

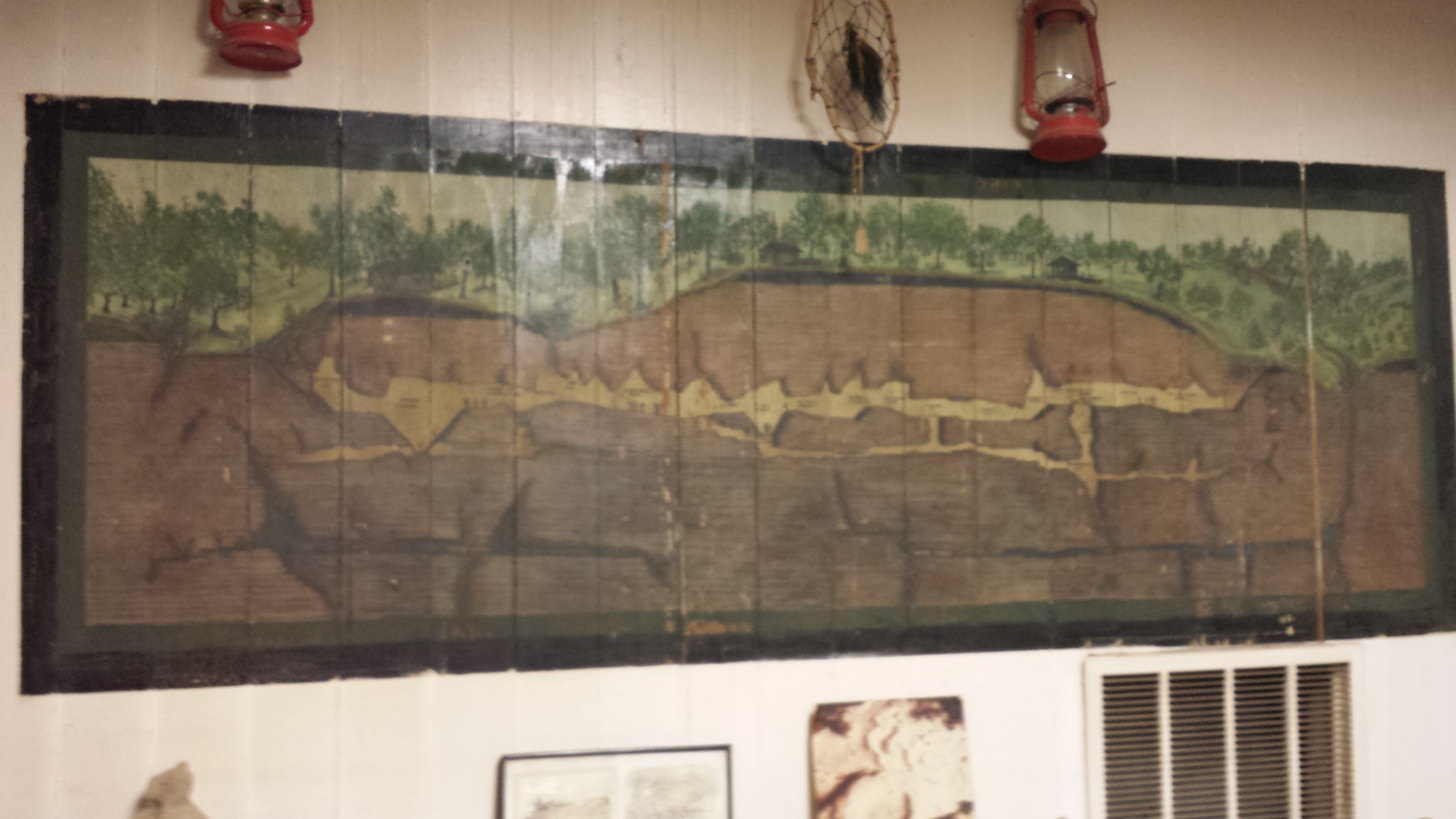
Photo of wall map in gift shop

In 1996, the Shawnee Nation, URB, an unrecognized tribe who claim Shawnee descent, purchased the caverns and surrounding land. They renamed the site as the Zane Shawnee Caverns.

The URB continues to operate the caverns as a show cave. They established the Shawnee Woodland Native American Museum, a Native American museum, on the site near Bellefontaine. Its displays include an exhibit about George Drouillard, a mixed-blood Shawnee guide who was the chief hunter and interpreter for the Lewis and Clark Expedition of 1804–1806. It explored the territory of the Louisiana Purchase and made it to the Pacific Ocean at the mouth of the Columbia River.

Also on the cavern's site is "Southwind Park", a camping and retreat area. It is also used to host URB events. A small permanent settlement has been erected at the site.

== Inside ==
Inside the cave are many rare formations, such as cave pearls, cave pearl nests on ledges, claws.

The cave's formation indicates its odd growth periods. The cave also features colder temperatures.

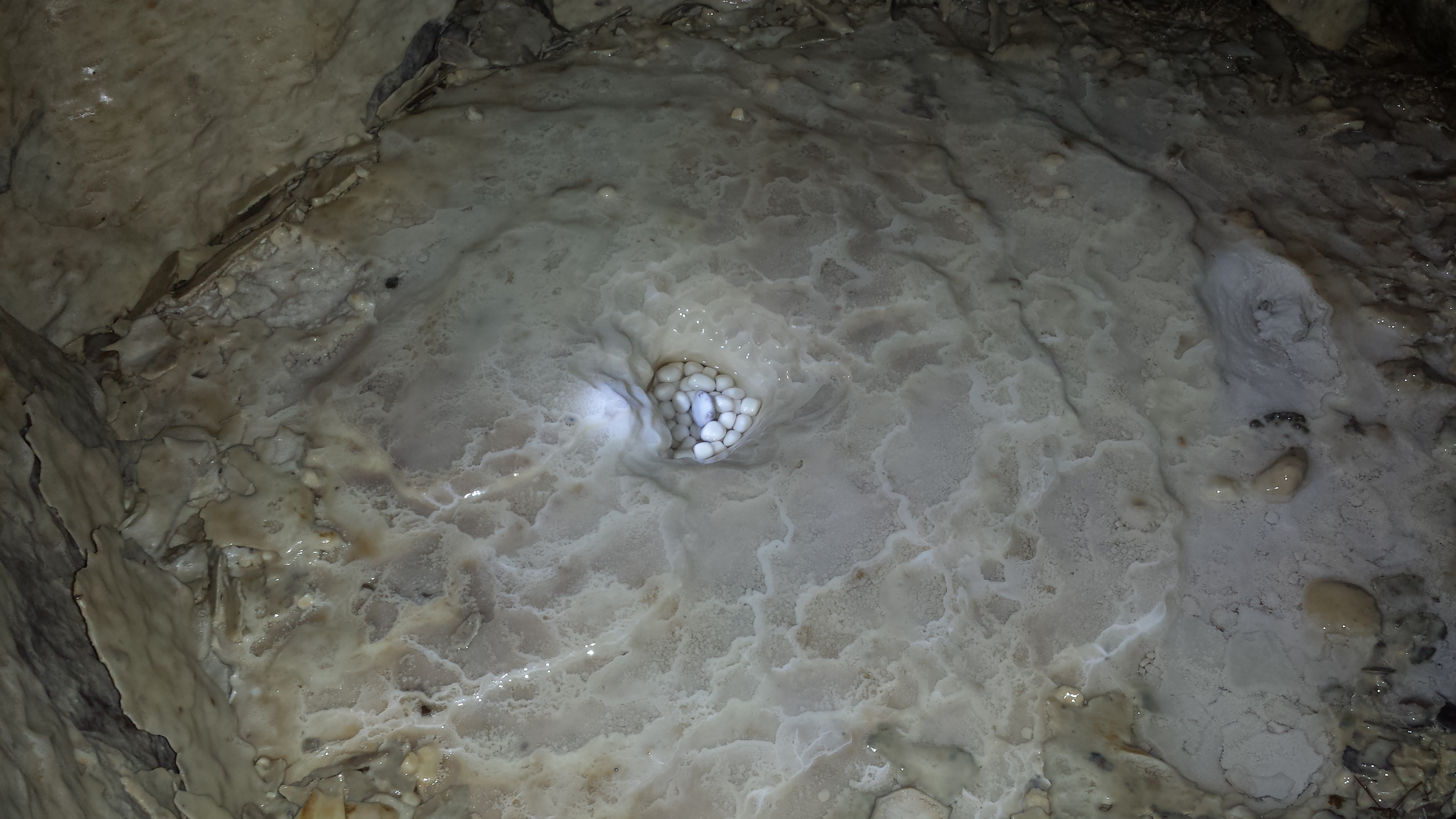
One of three cave pearl deposits at the Zane Shawnee Caverns
