= List of San Diego Padres no-hitters =

The San Diego Padres are an American professional baseball team based in San Diego. The Padres compete in Major League Baseball (MLB) as a member club of the National League (NL) West Division. The team joined the league in 1969, and was the last of the 30 teams in the league to throw a no-hitter, with Joe Musgrove finally accomplishing the feat on April 9, 2021.

== List of Padres no-hitters ==
¶	Indicates a perfect game
£	Pitcher was left-handed
*	Member of the National Baseball Hall of Fame and Museum

#	Date	Pitcher	Final score	Base- runners	Opponent	Catcher	Plate umpire	Manager	Notes	Ref
1	April 9, 2021	Joe Musgrove	3–0	1	@ Texas Rangers	Victor Caratini	Vic Carapazza	Jayce Tingler	First no-hitter in franchise history; First Padres no-hitter on the road; First right-handed pitcher to throw a no-hitter in franchise history; Only baserunner was hit by pitch with two outs in the fourth; First no-hitter thrown in Texas's Globe Life Field; Padres are only team to pitch their first no-hitter in an interleague game; The Padres hold the record for taking the longest of all active franchises to throw a no-hitter, at 8,205 games.	
2	July 25, 2024	Dylan Cease	3–0	3	@ Washington Nationals	Luis Campusano	Ramon De Jesus	Mike Shildt	Second no-hitter in franchise history; First no-hitter against a National League team; Cease had previously came within 1 out of a no-hitter while playing for the Chicago White Sox in 2022	
