= Nas'Naga =

American poet from Ohio, U.S. (1941–2012)

Nas'Naga (April 13, 1941 – July 7, 2012) is the pen-name of Roger W. Russell, an American writer, poet, and artist. He was the fourth writer whose work was featured in the Harper & Row Native American Publishing series.

== Early life and education ==
Roger Russell was born in Dayton, Ohio, to Bill and Kitty Russell. Jennifer McClinton-Temple and Alan Velie wrote in 2010 that he was a "Shawnee poet and artist". He was a member of the United Remnant Band of the Shawnee Nation, an unrecognized Shawnee cultural heritage group. He was educated in local public schools. He attended Texas Christian University, where he was mentored by Dr. Don Worcester and started writing. Russell served in the United States Navy from 1959 to 1963.

== Literary career ==
His young adult novel Indians' Summer (1975) appeared in the Harper & Row Native American Publishing series; Russell was the fourth author published. He used his Shawnee pen-name of Nas'Naga. It is described as shifting between farce and a recounting of issues related to Indian sovereignty. The novel depicts a revolution called in 1976 by the Sioux, Apache, Hopi, Navajo, Pueblo and Mohawk, just before the bicentennial of United States independence. They declare their own independence and the nation of Anishinabe-Waki (Land of the People), and the Sioux take control of nuclear weapons aimed at the White House. James Mackay in the Encyclopedia of American Indian Literature describes the novel as "one of the fullest literal explorations of Indian separatism, and one of the few books to envision a pan-Indian state." Mackay also notes that the novel reflects the political activism of the 1970s. Reviewer Norm Williamson says that, in the novel, Nas'Naga voices "the frustrations and dreams of the young Pan-Indian native person".

In 1979 Russell published two volumes of poetry, also as Nas'Naga.

Russell also worked as a community activist in Columbus. Proud of his family's heritage, he worked for American Indian causes through his writings, including articles and poems. He also drew illustrations on this theme and gave lectures about current Native Americans and their issues. He is survived by his wife Barbara.

== Legacy and honors ==
He was profiled in the Marquis Who's Who in America and in the World since 2002.

== Bibliography ==
- Indians' Summer (1975), novel
- The Darker Side of Glory (1979), poetry
- Faces beneath the grass (1979), poetry

== See also ==
- Native American Renaissance
- Native American Studies
- List of writers from peoples indigenous to the Americas
