= Mary McCleary =

American art historian

- Born: 1951 (age 74–75); Houston, TX
- Education: B.F.A., Texas Christian University, M.F.A., University of Oklahoma
- Known for: Printmaking, Collage
- Awards: Art League Houston's 2011 'Texas Artist of the Year'

Mary McCleary (born 1951) is a contemporary American artist currently living and working in Nacogdoches Texas, where she is Stephen F. Austin State University Regent's Professor of Art Emeritus. She is primarily known for her "multi-layered, extremely complex, and detailed" figurative 3-D collages

== Background ==
Born in Houston, she received her B.F.A. in printmaking and drawing from Texas Christian University and her M.F.A. in graphics from the University of Oklahoma. From 1975 to 2005, she taught art at Stephen F. Austin State University.

== Style and influences ==
McCleary began making collages in the 1970s. In a 2009 interview in The Houston Chronicle she states: "I was a print maker all through school, and when I got out of college and started teaching, my work shifted, because for the first time I wasn't accountable to a teacher. Somehow the work evolved over a number of years, and I started gluing three-dimensional items onto my collages — cut-paper things that almost look like advent calendars." Over the years, as her work became more figurative, the collages became "more complex and more detailed — the idea being to draw the viewer in, to give the viewer something to look at." McCleary has used a variety of materials, including paint, glitter, foil, wire, mirrors, nails, glass, and other objects on heavy paper, to create her collages.

The artist has noted the influence of her Christian faith in her work, and she has expressed a particular interest in exploring the struggle between good and evil. She has stated that "much in the way a painter builds layer upon layer of paint on canvas," the resulting images "convey an intensity which the viewer finds compelling... Drawing my subject matter from history and literature, I like the irony of using materials that are often trivial, foolish, and temporal to express ideas of what is significant, timeless, and transcendent." While McCleary's work often makes explicit references to overarching historical or philosophical concepts, it is more often composed of a variety of elements and references—a sort of mosaic of interrelated inquiries and epiphanies McCleary draws from her reading. In this way, the subtext of the work ties deeply in with the form it takes; for while the collages are formed from trivial objects, they nevertheless are, like the subjects they often evoke, a synthesis (in this case, of various forms, shapes, and textures).

== Collections and exhibitions ==
McCleary's artworks are included in numerous public collections, including those of the Museum of Fine Arts, Houston, the El Paso Museum of Art, and the San Antonio Museum of Art. In an effort to strengthen its holdings of contemporary art, the Crystal Bridges Museum of American Art in Bentonville, Arkansas, acquired McCleary's The Falcon Cannot Hear the Falconer (2008) for an undisclosed sum. A haunting work depicting domestic disaster, its "complex assemblage...represents a home engulfed in flames. A young man in the foreground, his face patterned with color, stares outward, confronting the viewer as a witness to the tragedy."

McCleary has participated in numerous solo and group exhibitions in museums and galleries in two dozen states, including the Museum of Fine Arts, Boston, the Contemporary Arts Museum Houston, and the Nelson-Atkins Museum of Art in Kansas City, and internationally in Russia and Mexico.

== Awards ==
She has been the recipient of numerous awards, including a Mid-American Arts Alliance/ National Endowment for the Arts Fellowship, recognition from the Texas Commission on the Arts "for her contribution and dedication to the arts in Texas," and Art League Houston's 'Texas Artist of the Year' for 2011.
