= Fort Dubois =

Coordinates: 49°54′52″N 4°04′24″E

Fort Dubois is a military construction from the 19th century, located in the town of Hirson in the Aisne department in Picardy in northern France. This fort was built between 1877 and 1880. It is the work of the French general and military engineer Raymond Adolphe Sere de Rivieres. It was intended to prevent the supply rail from potential invaders. In 1912, the fort was decommissioned. The fort was partially destroyed. It consisted of barracks, a bakery, powder magazines, a turret Mougin, single and double caponiers. Despite a clearance operation carried out in May 2006, many weapons remain on site and make it very dangerous. The access is logically prohibited.
