= Nina Vance =

Founder and first artistic director of Alley Theatre

- Born: October 22, 1914; Yoakum, Texas
- Died: February 18, 1980 (aged 65); Houston, Texas
- Occupation: artistic director

Nina Eloise Whittington Vance (1914–1980) was the founder and first artistic director of the Alley Theatre in Houston, Texas, United States. She received awards and recognition, both nationally and internationally, for her work and contribution to the theater community.

== Biography ==
Nina Vance, the only child of Calvin Perry and Minerva (DeWitt) Whittington, was born on October 22, 1914, in Yoakum, Texas. She was a direct descendant of Green DeWitt and Benjamin Beeson.

She attended Texas Christian University, receiving her B.A. in 1935, and pursuing post-graduate studies at Columbia University, the American Academy of Dramatic Arts and postgraduate work in theater at the American Academy of Dramatic Art, Columbia University, and the University of Southern California before moving to Houston in 1939 to work as a high school teacher.

She was married to Milton Vance, an attorney, but the childless marriage ended in divorce. Nina Vance died on February 18, 1980, in Houston at the age of 65.

== Early career ==
Vance began her career by teaching drama and speech at Jefferson Davis High School and San Jacinto High School. She also taught private acting classes on the side and, by 1941, was acting herself with the Houston Little Theatre and the Houston Community Players, a group headed by Margo Jones.

After Jones left Houston, Vance was asked to teach acting classes for the Jewish Community Center, but instead she offered her services as a director of plays. Although she was raised Presbyterian, she stipulated that the participants in her Players Guild could be of any religious denomination.

Vance directed over a dozen productions for the Players Guild between 1945 and 1947, and following the innovative lead of Margo Jones, her troupe performed in the round in places like the Rice and Lamar hotels. When the Players Guild disbanded, she and her group of theater enthusiasts were without a home.

== The Alley Theatre ==
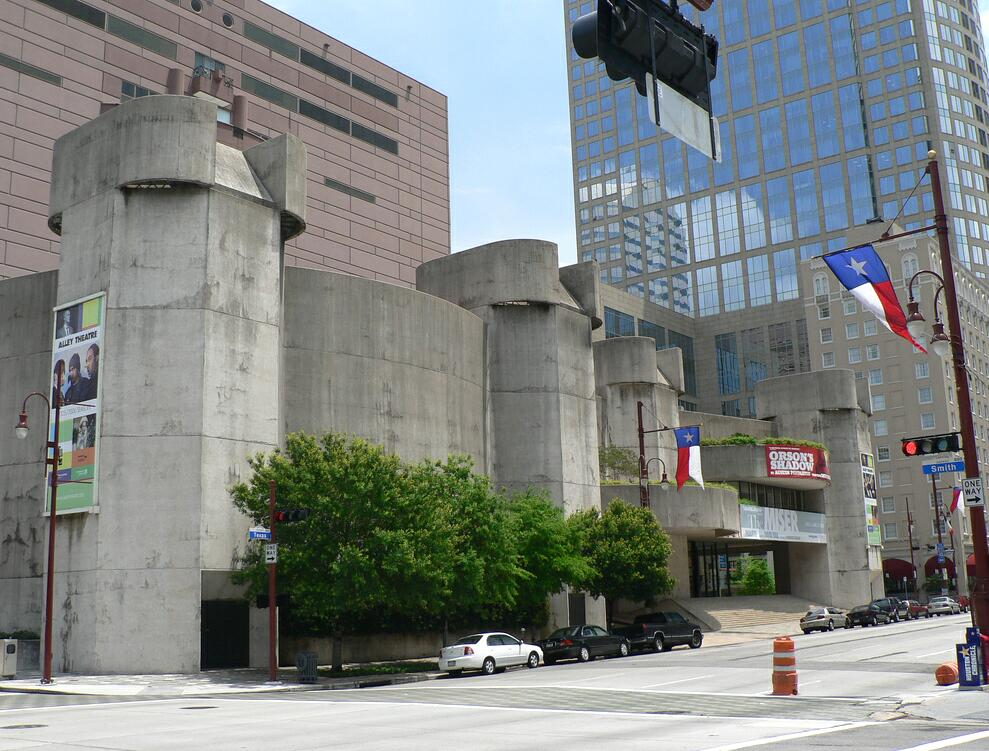
The Alley Theatre building

In the 1947, Vance and some friends decided to start a theatre group. She mailed out over 200 postcards inviting artists and potential sponsors to join a theatre company to be located off a Houston alleyway, and at the group's first meeting over 100 people interested in a new amateur theatre for Houston attended. The group voted on a name for the company, and the Alley Theatre was born.

In 1968, the Alley Theatre moved to its present home, on the corner of Texas Avenue and Smith Street in downtown Houston. The Alley is now one of the nation's leading regional repertory theatres and one of the oldest resident theatres in the United States.

== Awards and honors ==
In 1959, The Ford Foundation awarded Vance her first director's grant. The following year, President John F. Kennedy invited her to serve on his advisory committee to the National Cultural Center (now the Kennedy Center for the Performing Arts), and Secretary of State Dean Rusk appointed her to the U.S. Commission on International Education and Cultural Affairs, the only woman to so serve.

In addition, Vance was one of only seven American directors to attend contemporary Soviet theatre in Moscow, while touring the Soviet Union at the invitation of the Soviet Ministry of Culture and the U.S. Department of State. She received numerous other awards, including the Matrix Award of Theta Phi, the Outstanding Alumni Award of Texas Southern University and the Houston Y.W.C.A. Woman of the Year Award. After Vance died in 1980, the Alley was officially renamed "The Nina Vance Alley Theatre" in her honor.
