= James Cash Jr. =

American businessman (born 1947)

- Born: James Ireland Cash Jr. 1947 (age 78–79)
- Education: Texas Christian University (BS); Purdue University, West Lafayette (MS, PhD)

James Ireland Cash Jr. (born 1947) is an American business academic who is a member of the board of directors of several corporations, including General Electric, Microsoft (2001–2009), The Chubb Corporation, Phase Forward, Inc., Wal-Mart, and Veracode.

Cash holds the position of James E. Robison Professor of Business Administration, Emeritus at the Harvard Business School.

Cash joined the Harvard Business School faculty in 1976 and has taught in each of the major HBS programs – MBA, Program for Management Development (PMD), Program for Global Leadership (PGL), and Advanced Management Program (AMP). He served as Chairman of the MBA Program from 1992 to 1995 during the school's project to redesign the MBA Program and as Senior Associate Dean and Chairman of HBS Publishing. He retired from the Harvard Business School faculty in 2003. He also serves as a trustee of the Bert King Foundation, Massachusetts General Hospital, and Partners Healthcare and the National Association of Basketball Coaches Foundation.
