= Mike Matheny =

American baseball catcher and manager (born 1970)

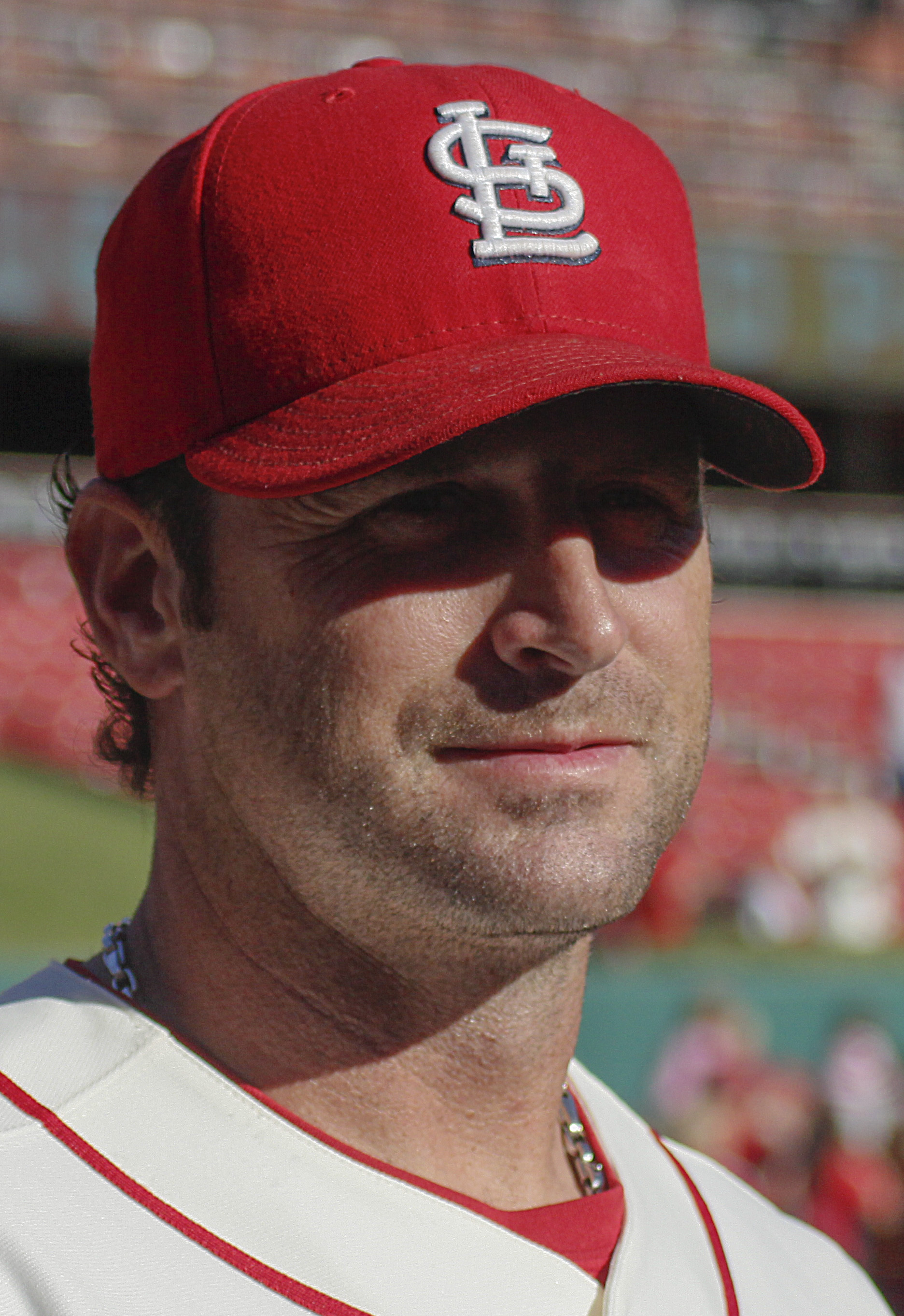
- Matheny with the St. Louis Cardinals in 2013
- Catcher / Manager
- Born: September 22, 1970 (age 56); Columbus, Ohio, U.S.
- Batted: Right Threw: Right

MLB debut
- April 7, 1994, for the Milwaukee Brewers

Last MLB appearance
- May 31, 2006, for the San Francisco Giants

MLB statistics
- Batting average: .239
- Home runs: 67
- Runs batted in: 443
- Managerial record: 756–693
- Winning %: .522
- Stats at Baseball Reference
- Managerial record at Baseball Reference

Teams
- As player: Milwaukee Brewers (1994–1998); Toronto Blue Jays (1999); St. Louis Cardinals (2000–2004); San Francisco Giants (2005–2006); As manager: St. Louis Cardinals (2012–2018); Kansas City Royals (2020–2022)

Career highlights and awards
- 4× Gold Glove Award (2000, 2003–2005)

Michael Scott Matheny (born September 22, 1970) is an American former professional baseball catcher and manager. He played 13 seasons in Major League Baseball (MLB) for the Milwaukee Brewers, Toronto Blue Jays, St. Louis Cardinals, and San Francisco Giants. He later spent seven seasons as the manager of the Cardinals, and three for the Kansas City Royals. One of the most accomplished defensive players of his era, he won four Gold Glove Awards. As manager of the Cardinals, his teams won one pennant and three NL Central division titles.

From Reynoldsburg, Ohio, Matheny played college baseball for the Michigan Wolverines and was selected by the Brewers in the eighth round of the 1991 MLB draft. He made his MLB debut as a member of the Milwaukee Brewers on April 7, 1994. Matheny established major league records among catchers for consecutive games played without committing an error (252), and consecutive chances fielded without an error (1,565). He is one of three catchers in major league history with an errorless season of at least 100 games, and in 2005, set a Giants single-season team record for catcher's fielding percentage at .999. Matheny made two World Series appearances, both with the Cardinals. He was a catcher in 2004 and a manager in 2013. He retired from playing in 2006 due to persisting symptoms of concussion, and has since become an advocate for its prevention and for improved catcher safety.

After his playing career, Matheny coached Little League Baseball. The Cardinals hired him to manage after the 2011 season although he had no professional coaching or managerial experience. In 2012, the Cardinals were wild card winners, and from 2013–15, claimed three consecutive NL Central titles, including winning a career-best 100 games for Matheny in 2015. He became the first manager in MLB history to lead his team to the playoffs in each of his first four seasons and the fifth to a League Championship Series appearance in each of his first three, reaching the 2013 World Series where the Cardinals were defeated by the Boston Red Sox. In 2018, he became the fourth Cardinals manager to manage the club in 1,000 games. The Cardinals fired him during that season after missing the playoffs the two previous years. Matheny then managed the Kansas City Royals for three seasons but did not make the playoffs and was dismissed at the conclusion of the 2022 season.

== Early life and amateur career ==
Matheny grew up in Reynoldsburg, Ohio, a suburb of Columbus. He graduated from Reynoldsburg High School, where he captained the baseball and football teams. He received little attention from nearby Ohio State University but accepted a scholarship offered by University of Michigan coach Bud Middaugh.

Out of high school, Matheny's defensive and throwing skills drew the notice of major league scouts, and the Toronto Blue Jays drafted him in the 31st round of the 1988 Major League Baseball draft. They waited two days until after the draft ended to tell him of his selection and initially refused to disclose which round they had selected him in. Two days before he was due to attend his first class at Michigan, Blue Jays general manager Pat Gillick appeared at Matheny's home to convince him to sign. Gillick was ready to offer a deal normally reserved for second-round picks. At the time, teams held the right to negotiate with their draft picks until the moment they entered their first classroom in the following academic year. The Blue Jays called Matheny frequently until the morning of his first class, hoping he would sign. However, Matheny was convinced that he would not be a very good professional player at that point, so he chose to attend college instead. Before proceeding to his first class, he called the Blue Jays from his dormitory room to inform them of his decision.

Matheny co-captained the Wolverines. He was also a member of the 1989 Connie Mack championship team. In 1990, he played collegiate summer baseball with the Cotuit Kettleers of the Cape Cod Baseball League and was named a league all-star.

== Playing career (1991–2006) ==
=== Minor leagues, Milwaukee Brewers and Toronto Blue Jays (1991–99) ===
The Milwaukee Brewers selected Matheny in the eighth round of the 1991 Major League Baseball draft, and he spent three years climbing the minor league system. He made his major league debut with the Brewers on April 7, 1994, at the age of 23. He became their starting catcher early in the next season.

During a game against the Pittsburgh Pirates on May 26, 1998, Matheny was batting in the bottom of the ninth when he took a pitch from Rich Loiselle off his face. Remaining upright, Matheny placed his hand on his hip as Pirates catcher Jason Kendall and home plate umpire Jerry Crawford motioned wildly for the Brewers trainers. He spat out a mouthful of blood as he walked off the field. At the end of that season, he became eligible for salary arbitration, and the Brewers granted him free agency a few months later.

Ten years after they drafted him, the Toronto Blue Jays signed him on December 23, 1998, for the 1999 season. He served as Darrin Fletcher's understudy. Toronto released him after the season.

=== St. Louis Cardinals (2000–04) ===
Matheny signed with the St. Louis Cardinals on December 15, 1999. He barely made the Cardinals roster out of spring training but went on to earn the starting catcher's role in 2000. He posted a career-high .261 batting average and provided exceptional defense for the Cardinals, with a .993 fielding percentage and throwing out 53 percent of attempted base stealers, well above the 32 percent league average. Matheny helped the Cardinals improve from their fourth-place finish in 1999 to winning the National League Central Division title, and claimed his first Gold Glove award in the process. After the season, the Cardinals signed him to a three-year, $9 million contract.

After teammate Darryl Kile's sudden death in the summer of 2002, Matheny showed that he was an inspirational leader, helping the team to cope and make it to the National League Championship Series. After the 2003 season, the St. Louis and Houston chapters of the BBWAA voted for Matheny as the inaugural winner of an award established in Kile's honor.

Bolstering his growing reputation as a top defensive catcher, Matheny again won Gold Gloves with the Cardinals in 2003 and 2004. His defensive contributions helped St. Louis reach the postseason in four of his five years with the team, including claiming the National League pennant in 2004. Between August 1, 2002, and August 4, 2004, Matheny played in 252 games without committing an error, establishing a new Major League record for catchers.

Matheny set another Major League record for catchers in 2004 by fielding 1,565 consecutive chances without an error. During his playing days in a Cardinal uniform, Matheny caught 611 games, accumulating 4,938.1 innings and committing just 14 errors. His .996 fielding percentage leads all catchers who have caught at least 2,000 innings for St. Louis. He became a free agent after the 2004 World Series, primarily due to the emergence of rookie catcher Yadier Molina, whom he would eventually manage.

=== San Francisco Giants (2005–06) ===
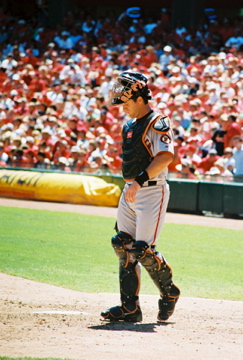
Matheny playing for the San Francisco Giants in 2006.

Matheny signed a three-year contract with the San Francisco Giants on December 13, 2004. The next season, he displayed a rare power surge, amassing career highs with 13 home runs, 34 doubles, a .406 slugging percentage, and 59 runs batted in (RBIs). Matheny continued his defensive excellence, compiling a team-record .999 fielding percentage and leading National League catchers with 13 double plays, 77 assists, and 39 base-stealers caught stealing, earning his fourth Gold Glove. He also took home the Willie Mac Award that year, accorded annually to a Giant player for spirit and leadership.

Matheny landed on the disabled list on May 31, 2006, after a series of foul balls caromed off his mask, resulting in a serious concussion. In July, the Giants announced that he would not return for the remainder of the season and that his career status was in doubt. Giants beat writer Rich Draper wrote that Matheny's career was likely over due to continued struggles with post-concussion syndrome.

=== Retirement and career statistics ===
On February 1, 2007, Matheny announced his retirement from Major League Baseball at the age of 35 due to ongoing symptoms of post-concussion syndrome.

In his 13-year major league career, Matheny played in 1,305 games, accumulating 925 hits in 3,877 at bats for a .239 career batting average, along with 67 home runs, 443 RBIs, and an on-base percentage of .293. He led National League catchers twice in fielding percentage, ending his career with a .994 average, which was four points above the league average during his playing career. His fielding percentage is tied for 24th best all-time among major league catchers, as of 2024. Matheny also twice led National League catchers in baserunners caught stealing.

== Managerial career ==
=== St. Louis Cardinals ===
==== Hiring ====
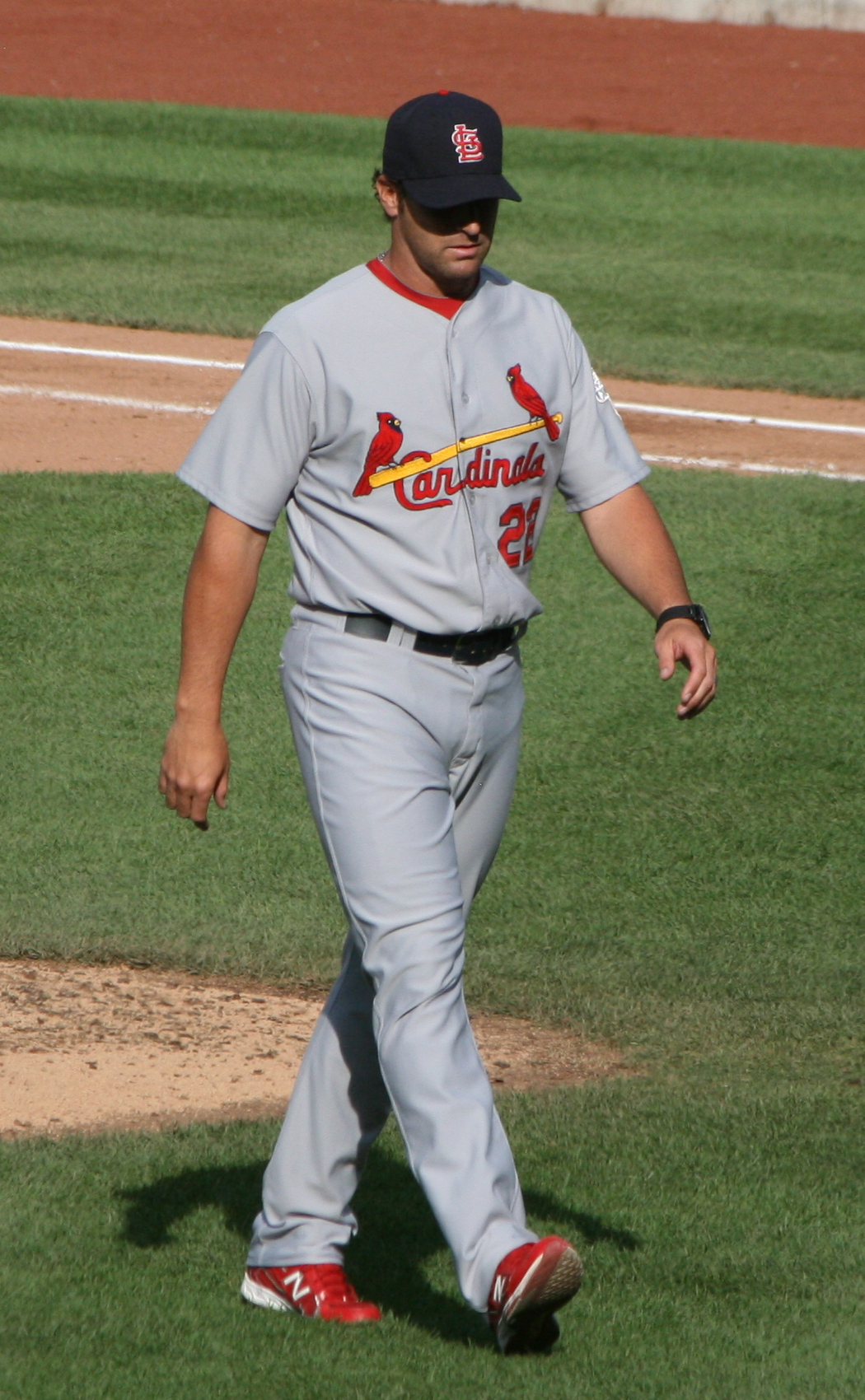
Matheny as manager of the Cardinals in June 2012.

On January 24, 2008, Matheny returned to the St. Louis Cardinals as a special adviser for the first two weeks of spring training. They announced him as their new manager on November 14, 2011, following Tony La Russa's retirement, making him the youngest manager in the major leagues. Matheny's other prior coaching experience included Little League Baseball, and other interviewees included Terry Francona, Ryne Sandberg, José Oquendo, Chris Maloney and Joe McEwing, all of whom already had managerial or coaching experience in the major leagues.

==== First season as manager (2012) ====
On April 4, 2012, Matheny won in his managerial debut against the Miami Marlins in the inaugural game at Marlins Park. Twenty days later, Matheny was ejected from a game for the first time for arguing a pivotal safe/out call by umpire Bill Welke in the bottom of the 10th inning of a 3–2 loss to the Chicago Cubs.

Matheny's first season as Cardinals manager was a success, finishing the regular season with an 88–74 record before winning the Wild Card game. The Giants defeated the Cardinals in the NLCS.

==== 2013–14 ====
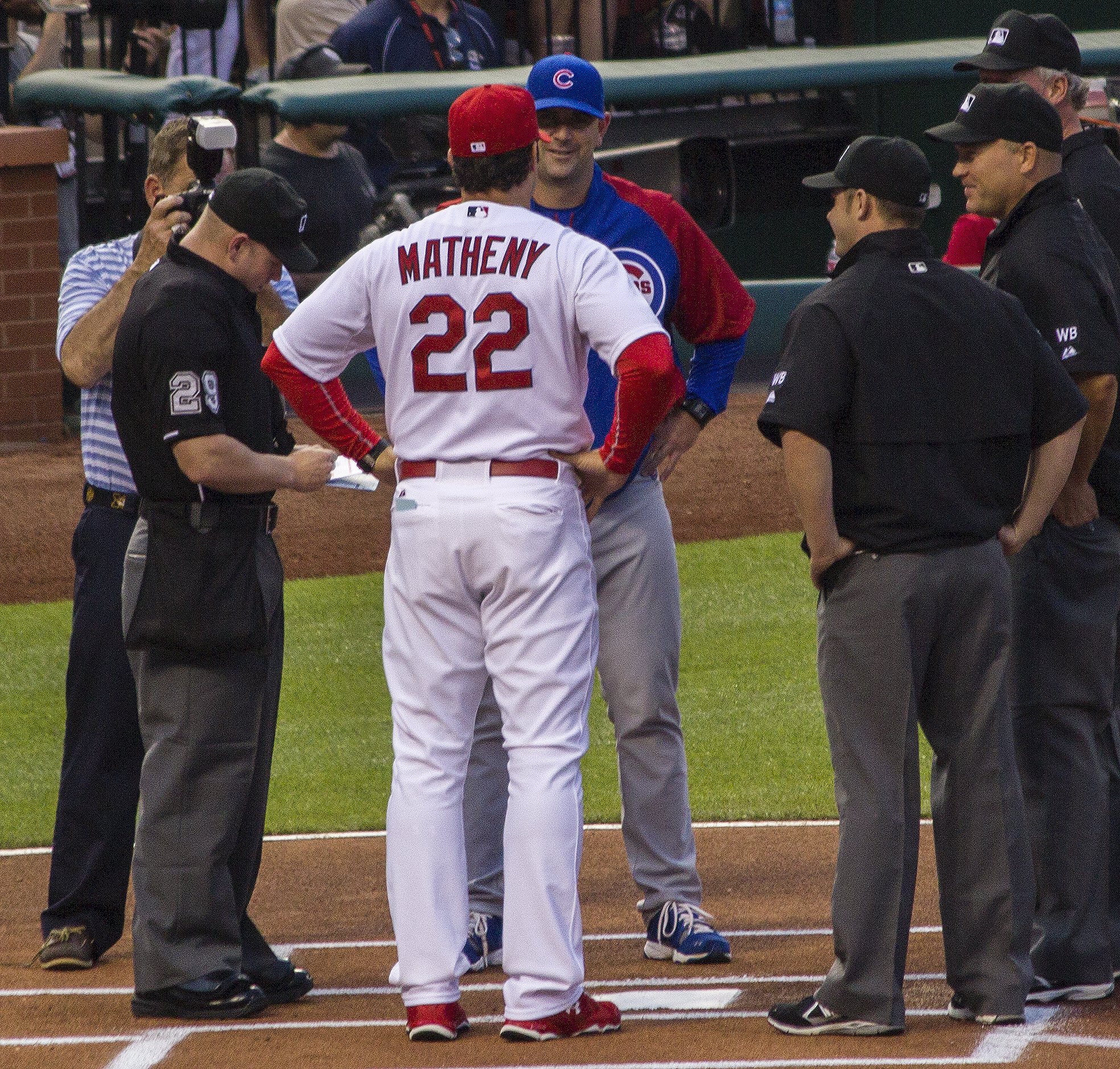
Matheny presents the Cardinals lineup card on May 12, 2014.

On February 14, 2013, the Cardinals picked up Matheny's 2014 option. He surpassed the success of his first season by guiding the club in 2013 to an NL-best 97–65 record and his first National League Central division title. The Cardinals defeated the Pittsburgh Pirates 3–2 in the NLDS and the Los Angeles Dodgers 4–2 in the NLCS for his first NL pennant. The Boston Red Sox defeated the Cardinals in the World Series in six games, with many similarities to 2004, when Matheny was also a catcher for St. Louis. As in the Cardinals finished with the best record in the NL, and the Red Sox likewise defeated the Cardinals in the World Series. However, in 2013, St. Louis lost four key players to season-ending injuries, including Chris Carpenter, Rafael Furcal, Jaime García, and Jason Motte, and rookies comprised half of the World Series pitching staff. On November 20, 2013, the Cardinals extended Matheny's contract for three more years through 2017.

Making his first All-Star appearance as a major leaguer, Matheny was the NL manager in the 2014 game, which he lost. The Cardinals won the NL Central division title in 2014, their second consecutive title, and third consecutive playoff appearance with Matheny as manager. More trends continued as they eliminated the Dodgers from the playoffs for the second consecutive season, this time in the NLDS. Just like in 2012, the Giants eliminated the Cardinals in the NLCS before winning the World Series.

==== 2015 ====
After defeating the Chicago Cubs 10–9 on May 4, 2015, the Cardinals had an MLB-best 19–6 record and the best 25-game start for the club since at least 1900. The seven game win streak was a career-high for Matheny. The Cardinals defeated the Cubs again the next game, 7–4, extending the win streak to eight. A 3–1 victory over the Detroit Tigers on May 17, 2015, secured the 300th win of his managerial career. In August 2015, Baseball America published that fellow NL managers and coaches rated Matheny the second-best manager in the league. On September 19, the Cardinals became the first team in the majors to qualify for the playoffs. Matheny became the first manager in MLB history to guide his club to the postseason in each of his first four full seasons. With an 11–1 win over the Pittsburgh Pirates on September 30, the Cardinals won 100 games for the first time in Matheny's managerial career, while clinching their third consecutive NL Central division title. The Pirates, who had kept close for most of the season, had already won 96 games, while clinching a wild card berth. However, the Cubs, the second wild card team, defeated the Cardinals in the NLDS in four games. Matheny finished second in the NL Manager of the Year Award voting, and was a co-winner of the J. G. Taylor Spink St. Louis Baseball Man of the Year Award.

==== 2016−2018 ====
On May 27, 2016, Matheny gained his 400th career win in a 6–2 defeat of the Washington Nationals. In 2016, Matheny's contract was extended to 2022.

On May 1, 2018, Matheny became the fourth person, following Red Schoendienst, Whitey Herzog, and Tony La Russa, to manage 1,000 Cardinals games. However, the Cardinals fired him on July 14, following middling performance and clubhouse issues, including Matheny's poor communication with Dexter Fowler. His 2018 record was 47–46, and his career in St. Louis over 1,065 games was 591–474 (.555). The Cardinals did not make the postseason in his final three seasons as manager.

=== Kansas City Royals ===
On October 31, 2019, Matheny was hired as manager of the Kansas City Royals following the retirement of Ned Yost. Matheny had previously been a special advisor for player development for the Royals. The Royals exercised a contract option on March 31, 2022, retaining Matheny through the 2023 season. On October 5, 2022, the Royals fired Matheny following the dismissal of general manager Dayton Moore. He did not have a winning season with the Royals, peaking at 74 wins in 2021.

=== Managerial record ===
Team	Year	Regular season					Postseason			
Team	Year	Games	Won	Lost	Win %	Finish	Won	Lost	Win %	Result
STL	2012	162	88	74	.543	2nd in NL Central	7	6	.538	Lost NLCS (SF)
STL	2013	162	97	65	.599	1st in NL Central	9	8	.529	Lost World Series (BOS)
STL	2014	162	90	72	.556	1st in NL Central	4	5	.444	Lost NLCS (SF)
STL	2015	162	100	62	.617	1st in NL Central	1	3	.250	Lost NLDS (CHC)
STL	2016	162	86	76	.531	2nd in NL Central	–	–	–	
STL	2017	162	83	79	.512	3rd in NL Central	–	–	–	
STL	2018	93	47	46	.505	Fired	–	–	–	
STL total		1065	591	474	.555		21	22	.488	
KC	2020	60	26	34	.433	4th in AL Central	–	–	–	
KC	2021	162	74	88	.457	4th in AL Central	–	–	–	
KC	2022	162	65	97	.401	5th in AL Central	–	–	–	
KC total		384	165	219	.430		–	–	–	
Total		1,449	756	693	.522		21	22	.488	

== Awards and accomplishments ==
=== Accomplishments ===
- First manager in MLB history to guide team to playoffs in each of first four seasons (2012–15)
- 100-win season as manager (2015)
- MLB record for consecutive games caught without an error (252 from 2002–04)
- One of three catchers in MLB history with fielding percentage of 1.000 with at least 100 games caught (2003)
- Three consecutive seasons with fielding percentage of .999 or above, one or fewer errors and at least 100 games caught (2003–05)
- San Francisco Giants' single-season record for catcher's fielding percentage (.999 in 2005)
- 1,000 games managed (St. Louis Cardinals)

=== Awards ===
- 2× Baseball America Toolbox Awards for best manager (2014 – 2nd, 2015 – 2nd)
- Darryl Kile Good Guy Award (2003)
- Major League Baseball All-Star (2014)
- Missouri Athletic Club Sports Personality of the Year (2015)
- 6× National League Central division title winner (2000, 2002, 2004, 2013, 2014, 2015)
- 2× National League pennant winner (2004, 2013)
- 4× Rawlings Gold Glove Award at catcher (2000, 2003–05)
- Willie Mac Award (2005)
Also:
- National League Manager of the Year voting results: 5th (2012), 4th (2013), 4th (2014), 2nd (2015)

== Personal life ==
Matheny's wife, Kristen, is a former field hockey player at the University of Michigan. They have five children. Their oldest son, Tate, played college baseball at Missouri State University and was drafted by the Boston Red Sox in the fourth round of the 2015 MLB draft. Their daughter, Katie, played ice hockey at Ohio State. To date, two of the younger Matheny sons have played college baseball, Luke for Saint Louis University and Blaise for Missouri State. Matheny majored in sports management and communications with an emphasis in Spanish.

Matheny routinely chronicles his life experiences and maintains a blog of which topics includes leadership and changing the culture of youth sports. He is a devout Christian, often including Bible verse citations when he signs autographs.

=== Charity work ===
Matheny organized and created Catch-22, a charitable organization (named for his playing position and uniform number) which donated tickets for Cardinals games between 2002 and 2004. In 2005, Matheny opened the Catch-22 Miracle Field at the Chesterfield Valley Athletic complex in Chesterfield, Missouri. The field has a completely flat and firm rubber surface and other features to allow children with a wide array of physical and mental handicaps to participate.

=== Real estate ===
Unprofitable real estate transactions left Matheny heavily in debt. In 2005, Matheny founded MPD Partnership with two former professional indoor soccer players, Daryl Doran and Brett Phillips. They purchased a block of the WingHaven development in St. Charles and realized a $2.4 million profit in six months. After Doran left the partnership to start a gym, Matheny and Phillips used their money to secure an $11.8 million loan from the Business Bank of St. Louis for an 11-acre tract near Interstate 64. That investment lost money, at least partially due to the 2008 financial crisis, and Matheny wound up more than $4 million in debt. In May 2010, he wrote to the Business Bank to say that he would not repay the remainder of the loan. The bank sued him one month later.

In 2010, he lost a 17-room house in Wildwood, Missouri, following insolvency on two commercial plots in near Chesterfield Valley.

Matheny's attorney, Robert Blitz, was handling a similar case—Fischer and Frichtel, a homebuilder who also defaulted on assets after sustaining losses over the same time period, contends that they should not be fully liable for what is termed as "deflationary debt". The St. Louis appellate court deferred the case to the Supreme Court of Missouri. In January 2013, a circuit court ruling determined that the Matheny partnership owed the Business Bank $4.4 million.

== See also ==
- List of Major League Baseball career putouts as a catcher leaders
- List of St. Louis Cardinals team records
- St. Louis Cardinals award winners and league leaders
