= List of Gold Glove Award winners at catcher =

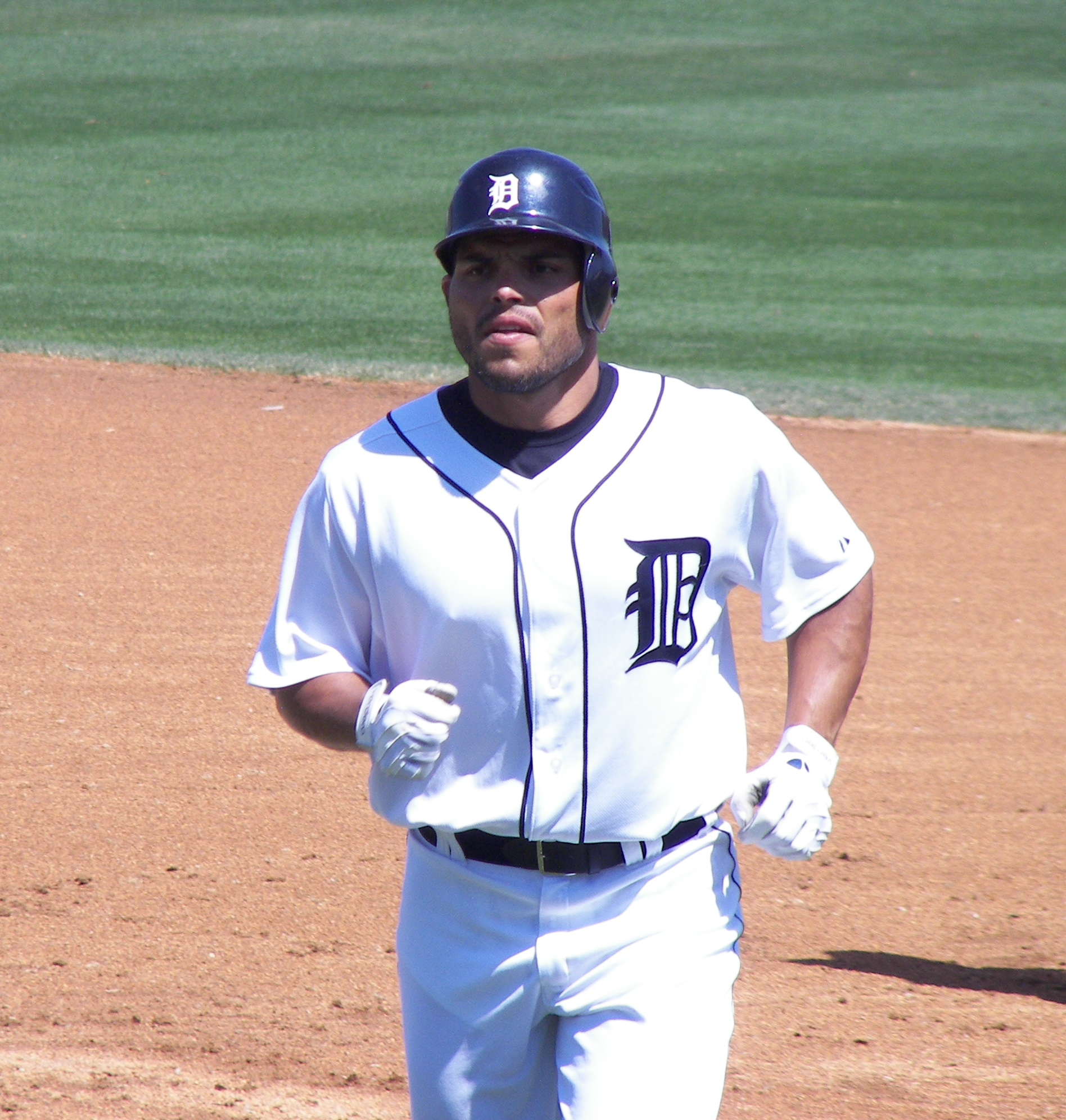
Iván Rodríguez has won 13 Gold Gloves, the most among catchers.

The Rawlings Gold Glove Award, usually referred to as the Gold Glove, is the award given annually to the Major League Baseball players judged to have exhibited superior individual fielding performances at each fielding position in both the National League (NL) and the American League (AL), as voted by the managers and coaches in each league. Managers are not permitted to vote for their own players. Eighteen Gold Gloves are awarded each year (with the exception of 1957, 1985, 2007 and 2018), one at each of the nine positions in each league. In 1957, the baseball glove manufacturer Rawlings created the Gold Glove Award to commemorate the best fielding performance at each position. The award was created from a glove made from gold lamé-tanned leather and affixed to a walnut base. Initially, only one Gold Glove per position was awarded to the top fielder at each position in the entire league; however, separate awards were given for the National and American Leagues beginning in 1958.

Iván Rodríguez has won the most Gold Gloves at catcher, with 13; all were won with the Texas Rangers or the Detroit Tigers (both American League teams), though Rodríguez has played in both leagues. Johnny Bench, who spent his entire career with the Cincinnati Reds, leads National Leaguers in wins, and is second overall with 10 Gold Gloves. Yadier Molina is third overall and second in the NL all time with nine. Bob Boone, who is a member of one of four family pairs to win Gold Glove Awards, won seven between both leagues during his career. Jim Sundberg has won six Gold Gloves, with Bill Freehan and Salvador Pérez winning five. There have been four 4-time winners at catcher: Del Crandall, Mike Matheny, Charles Johnson, and Tony Peña. Hall of Famers who have won as catchers include Bench, Rodriguez, Carlton Fisk, and Gary Carter.^{[d]} The other family pair to win Gold Gloves as catchers are brothers Bengie and Yadier Molina, who have won eleven awards between them as of the end of the 2018 season.

J. T. Realmuto set the record for putouts among winning catchers in 2022; he put out 1,151 batters for the Philadelphia Phillies that season. In the American League, the leader is Roberto Pérez, with 1,082 putouts in 2019. Assist leaders include Carter (108 in 1980) in the National League and the major leagues and Sundberg (103 in 1977) in the American League. Five Gold Glove-winning catchers have posted errorless seasons with a 1.000 fielding percentage: Johnson (1997), Matheny (2003), Salvador Pérez (2018), Tucker Barnhart (2020), and Roberto Pérez (2020). Johnny Edwards and Johnson hold the major league record for double plays turned among winners, with 17 each. Edwards doubled off 17 runners in 1964, and Johnson matched his total in 1997. The American League leaders are Ray Fosse, Boone and Matt Wieters (16 double plays in 1971, 1986 and 2011, respectively). Bench (NL; 1975), Roberto Pérez (AL; 2019–2020) and Jacob Stallings (NL; 2021) hold the record for the least passed balls in a season with zero. Roberto Pérez has the highest percentage of baserunners caught stealing, with a 71% mark set in 2020. Bench is the National League leader; he threw out 57% of potential base-stealers in 1969.

== Key ==
| Year | Links to the corresponding Major League Baseball season |
| PO | Putout |
| A | Assist |
| E | Error |
| DP | Double play |
| FPct | Fielding percentage |
| PB | Passed balls |
| CS% | Caught stealing percentage^{[a]} |
| * or ** | Winner of the most Gold Glove Awards at his position (** indicates tie) |
| † | Member of the National Baseball Hall of Fame and Museum |

== American League winners ==
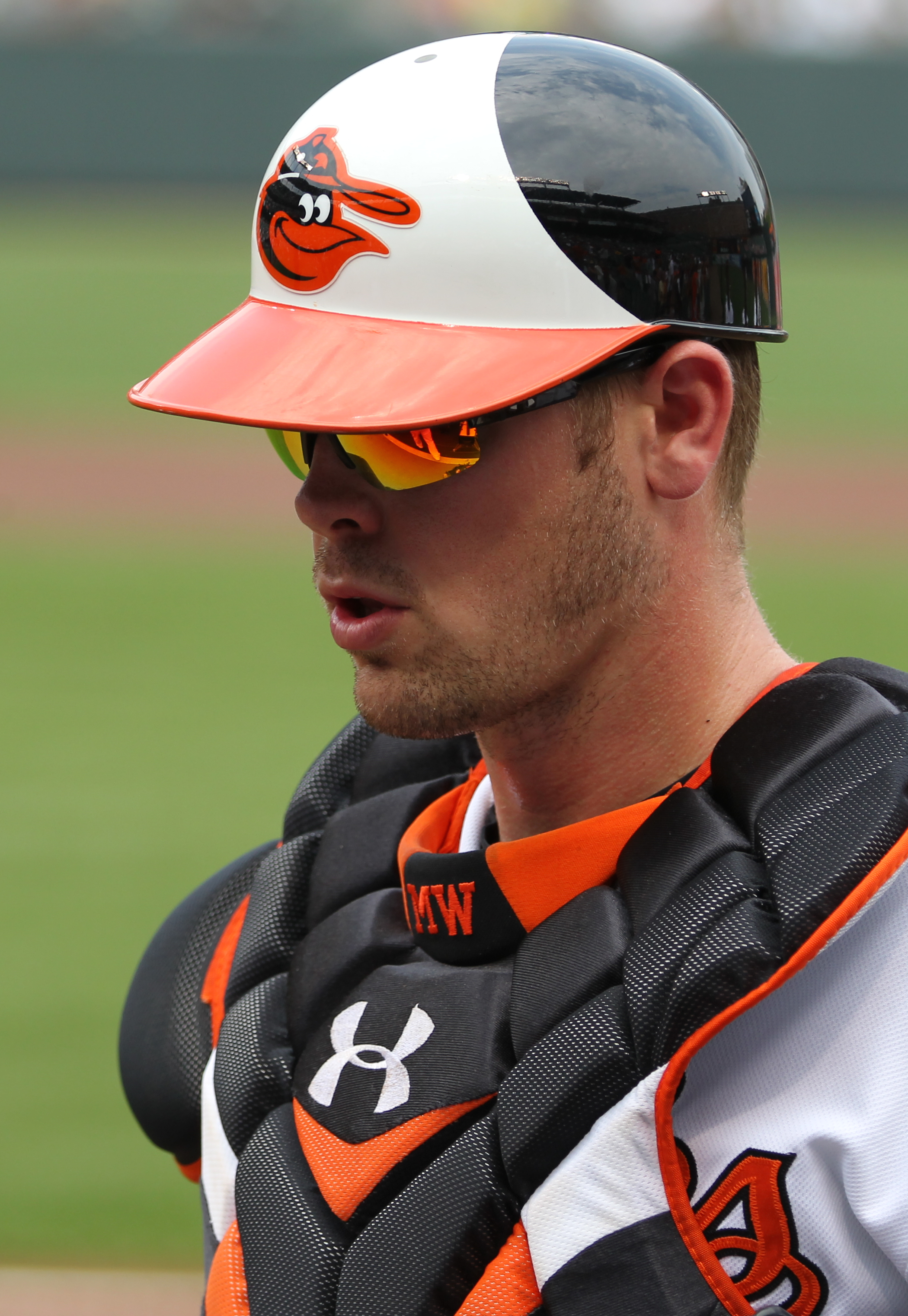
Matt Wieters (2011 AL Gold Glove winner)

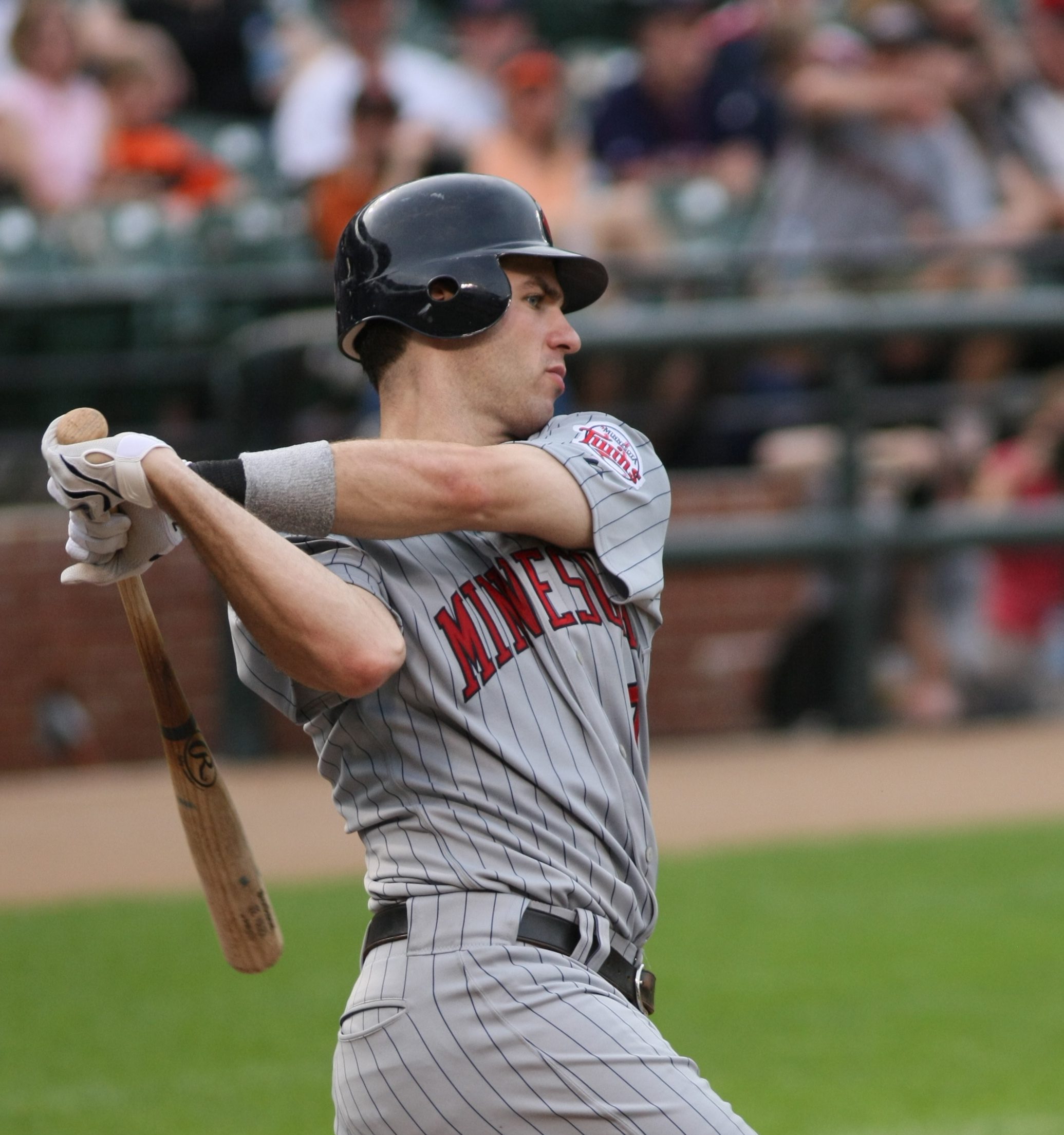
Joe Mauer (2008–2010 AL Gold Glove winner)

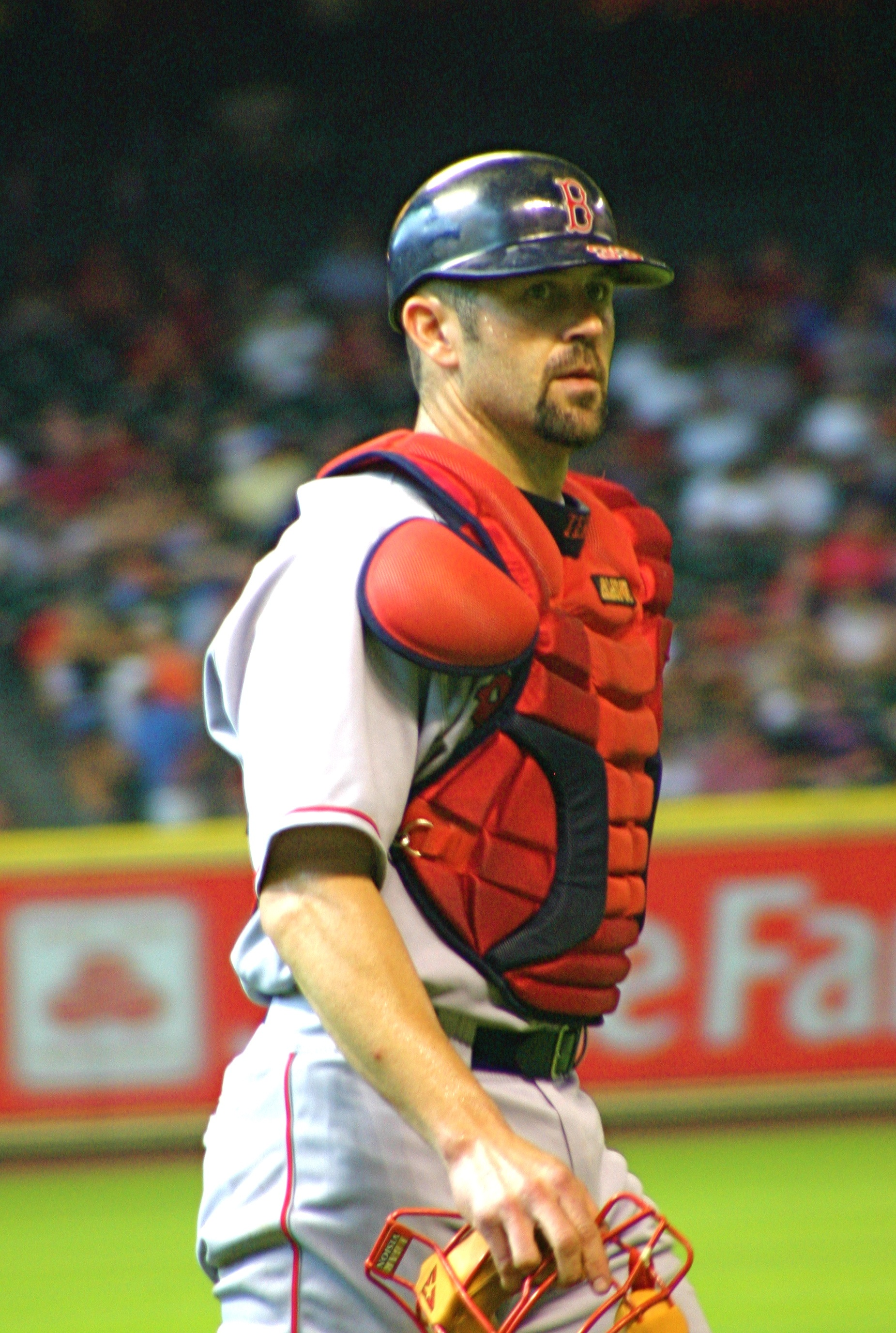
Jason Varitek (2005 AL Gold Glove winner)

| Year | Player | Team | PO | A | E | DP | FPct | PB | CS% | Ref |
|---|---|---|---|---|---|---|---|---|---|---|
| 1957^{[b]} | Sherm Lollar | Chicago White Sox | 454 | 45 | 1 | 5 | .998 | 5 | 48% | |
| 1958 | Sherm Lollar | Chicago White Sox | 597 | 63 | 9 | 8 | .987 | 5 | 47% | |
| 1959 | Sherm Lollar | Chicago White Sox | 623 | 51 | 5 | 14 | .993 | 4 | 42% | |
| 1960 | Earl Battey | Washington Senators | 749 | 65 | 15 | 10 | .982 | 18 | 59% | |
| 1961 | Earl Battey | Minnesota Twins | 812 | 60 | 6 | 9 | .993 | 13 | 37% | |
| 1962 | Earl Battey | Minnesota Twins | 872 | 82 | 9 | 9 | .991 | 13 | 44% | |
| 1963 | Elston Howard | New York Yankees | 786 | 51 | 5 | 8 | .994 | 8 | 41% | |
| 1964 | Elston Howard | New York Yankees | 939 | 67 | 2 | 9 | .998 | 8 | 49% | |
| 1965 | Bill Freehan | Detroit Tigers | 865 | 57 | 4 | 4 | .996 | 20 | 36% | |
| 1966 | Bill Freehan | Detroit Tigers | 898 | 56 | 4 | 11 | .996 | 3 | 35% | |
| 1967 | Bill Freehan | Detroit Tigers | 950 | 63 | 8 | 9 | .992 | 16 | 36% | |
| 1968 | Bill Freehan | Detroit Tigers | 971 | 73 | 6 | 15 | .994 | 7 | 37% | |
| 1969 | Bill Freehan | Detroit Tigers | 821 | 49 | 7 | 7 | .992 | 9 | 32% | |
| 1970 | Ray Fosse | Cleveland Indians | 854 | 70 | 10 | 7 | .989 | 17 | 55% | |
| 1971 | Ray Fosse | Cleveland Indians | 748 | 73 | 10 | 16 | .988 | 13 | 40% | |
| 1972 | Carlton Fisk^{†} | Boston Red Sox | 846 | 72 | 15 | 10 | .984 | 8 | 39% | |
| 1973 | Thurman Munson | New York Yankees | 673 | 80 | 12 | 11 | .984 | 10 | 48% | |
| 1974 | Thurman Munson | New York Yankees | 743 | 75 | 22 | 10 | .974 | 6 | 35% | |
| 1975 | Thurman Munson | New York Yankees | 700 | 95 | 23 | 14 | .972 | 9 | 50% | |
| 1976 | Jim Sundberg | Texas Rangers | 719 | 96 | 7 | 11 | .991 | 6 | 42% | |
| 1977 | Jim Sundberg | Texas Rangers | 801 | 103 | 5 | 12 | .994 | 5 | 56% | |
| 1978 | Jim Sundberg | Texas Rangers | 769 | 91 | 3 | 14 | .997 | 8 | 48% | |
| 1979 | Jim Sundberg | Texas Rangers | 754 | 75 | 4 | 14 | .995 | 8 | 41% | |
| 1980 | Jim Sundberg | Texas Rangers | 853 | 76 | 7 | 7 | .993 | 17 | 34% | |
| 1981 | Jim Sundberg | Texas Rangers | 464 | 52 | 2 | 9 | .996 | 8 | 48% | |
| 1982 | Bob Boone | California Angels | 650 | 87 | 8 | 8 | .989 | 2 | 58% | |
| 1983 | Lance Parrish | Detroit Tigers | 695 | 73 | 4 | 8 | .995 | 10 | 49% | |
| 1984 | Lance Parrish | Detroit Tigers | 720 | 67 | 7 | 11 | .991 | 11 | 46% | |
| 1985 | Lance Parrish | Detroit Tigers | 695 | 53 | 5 | 9 | .993 | 8 | 38% | |
| 1986 | Bob Boone | California Angels | 812 | 84 | 11 | 16 | .988 | 8 | 51% | |
| 1987 | Bob Boone | California Angels | 684 | 56 | 13 | 11 | .983 | 7 | 46% | |
| 1988 | Bob Boone | California Angels | 506 | 66 | 8 | 9 | .986 | 1 | 40% | |
| 1989 | Bob Boone | Kansas City Royals | 752 | 64 | 7 | 6 | .991 | 3 | 42% | |
| 1990 | Sandy Alomar Jr. | Cleveland Indians | 686 | 46 | 14 | 6 | .981 | 11 | 34% | |
| 1991 | Tony Peña | Boston Red Sox | 864 | 60 | 5 | 15 | .995 | 5 | 33% | |
| 1992 | Iván Rodríguez*^{†} | Texas Rangers | 763 | 85 | 15 | 10 | .983 | 10 | 52% | |
| 1993 | Iván Rodríguez*^{†} | Texas Rangers | 801 | 76 | 8 | 6 | .991 | 14 | 44% | |
| 1994 | Iván Rodríguez*^{†} | Texas Rangers | 600 | 44 | 5 | 3 | .992 | 7 | 38% | |
| 1995 | Iván Rodríguez*^{†} | Texas Rangers | 707 | 67 | 8 | 8 | .990 | 8 | 48% | |
| 1996 | Iván Rodríguez*^{†} | Texas Rangers | 850 | 81 | 10 | 11 | .989 | 10 | 51% | |
| 1997 | Iván Rodríguez*^{†} | Texas Rangers | 821 | 75 | 7 | 11 | .992 | 3 | 57% | |
| 1998 | Iván Rodríguez*^{†} | Texas Rangers | 864 | 72 | 6 | 7 | .994 | 10 | 56% | |
| 1999 | Iván Rodríguez*^{†} | Texas Rangers | 850 | 83 | 7 | 13 | .993 | 1 | 55% | |
| 2000 | Iván Rodríguez*^{†} | Texas Rangers | 507 | 34 | 2 | 10 | .996 | 2 | 49% | |
| 2001 | Iván Rodríguez*^{†} | Texas Rangers | 631 | 52 | 7 | 11 | .990 | 2 | 60% | |
| 2002 | Bengie Molina | Anaheim Angels | 707 | 60 | 1 | 6 | .999 | 5 | 45% | |
| 2003 | Bengie Molina | Anaheim Angels | 672 | 62 | 5 | 10 | .993 | 4 | 44% | |
| 2004 | Iván Rodríguez*^{†} | Detroit Tigers | 770 | 52 | 11 | 6 | .987 | 3 | 32% | |
| 2005 | Jason Varitek | Boston Red Sox | 783 | 33 | 8 | 4 | .990 | 7 | 24% | |
| 2006 | Iván Rodríguez*^{†} | Detroit Tigers | 747 | 53 | 2 | 7 | .998 | 4 | 51% | |
| 2007 | Iván Rodríguez*^{†} | Detroit Tigers | 834 | 50 | 6 | 7 | .993 | 7 | 31% | |
| 2008 | Joe Mauer^{†} | Minnesota Twins | 831 | 52 | 3 | 1 | .997 | 4 | 36% | |
| 2009 | Joe Mauer^{†} | Minnesota Twins | 724 | 31 | 3 | 3 | .996 | 9 | 26% | |
| 2010 | Joe Mauer^{†} | Minnesota Twins | 696 | 34 | 3 | 3 | .996 | 4 | 26% | |
| 2011 | Matt Wieters | Baltimore Orioles | 859 | 70 | 5 | 16 | .995 | 1 | 37% | |
| 2012 | Matt Wieters | Baltimore Orioles | 994 | 52 | 10 | 7 | .991 | 5 | 39% | |
| 2013 | Salvador Pérez | Kansas City Royals | 932 | 71 | 8 | 4 | .992 | 3 | 35% | |
| 2014 | Salvador Pérez | Kansas City Royals | 1,037 | 72 | 9 | 5 | .992 | 5 | 30% | |
| 2015 | Salvador Pérez | Kansas City Royals | 976 | 90 | 4 | 11 | .996 | 4 | 31% | |
| 2016 | Salvador Pérez | Kansas City Royals | 992 | 77 | 4 | 4 | .996 | 5 | 48% | |
| 2017 | Martin Maldonado | Los Angeles Angels | 1,046 | 65 | 2 | 2 | .998 | 8 | 39% | |
| 2018 | Salvador Pérez | Kansas City Royals | 690 | 69 | 0 | 11 | 1.000 | 4 | 48% | |
| 2019 | Roberto Pérez | Cleveland Indians | 1,082 | 52 | 3 | 12 | .997 | 0 | 41% | |
| 2020 | Roberto Pérez | Cleveland Indians | 291 | 21 | 0 | 2 | 1.000 | 0 | 71% | |
| 2021 | Sean Murphy | Oakland Athletics | 873 | 42 | 6 | 6 | .993 | 1 | 24% | |
| 2022 | Jose Trevino | New York Yankees | 828 | 32 | 6 | 1 | .993 | 2 | 33% | |
| 2023 | Jonah Heim | Texas Rangers | 938 | 40 | 2 | 8 | .998 | 7 | 29% | |
| 2024 | Cal Raleigh | Seattle Mariners | 1,138 | 51 | 6 | 8 | .995 | 5 | 28% | |
| 2025 | Dillon Dingler | Detroit Tigers | 1,023 | 39 | 7 | 5 | .993 | 0 | 32% | |
| 2026 | Dillon Dingler | Detroit Tigers | 934 | 39 | 5 | 2 | .995 | 4 | 27% | |

== National League winners ==
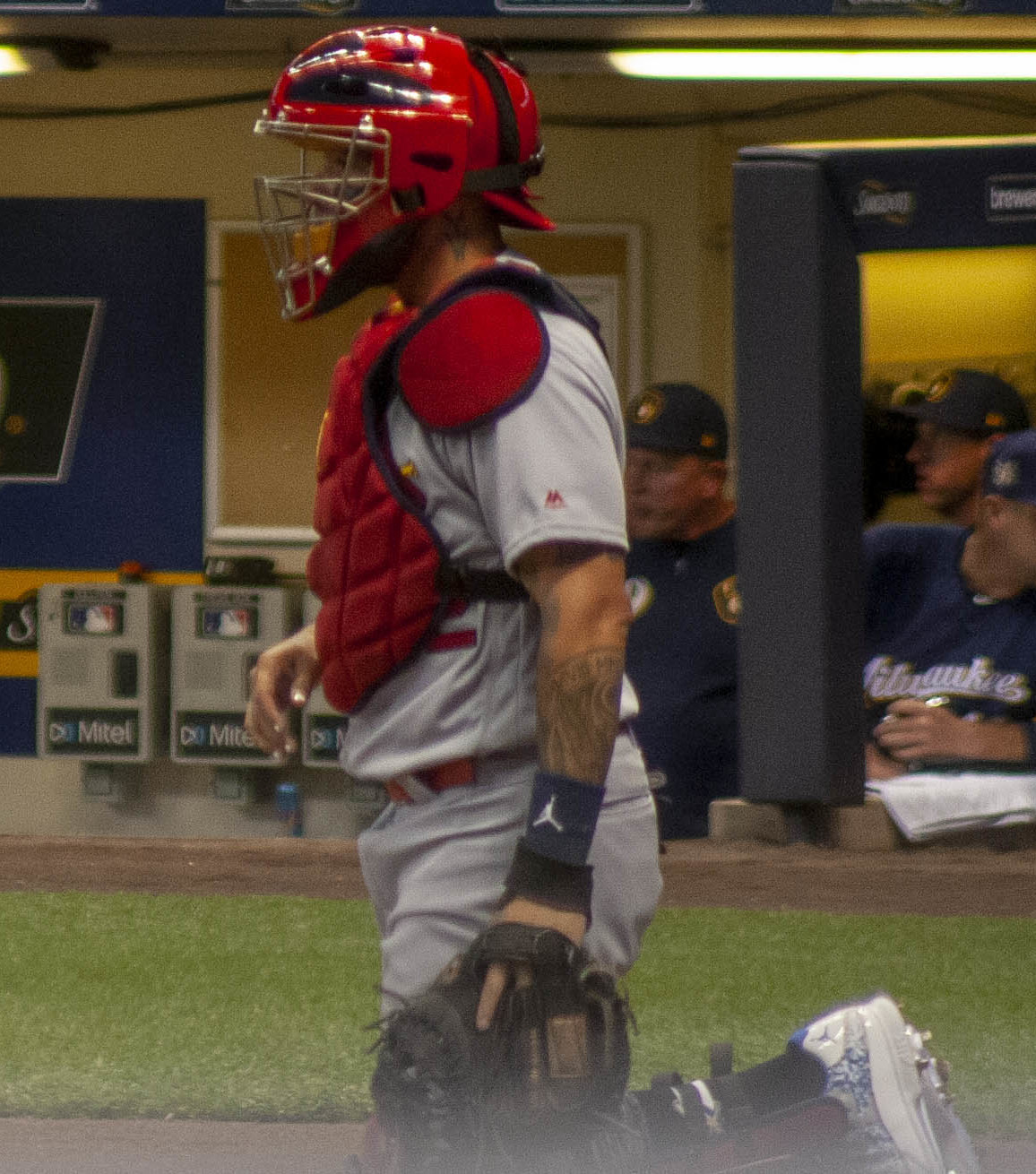
Yadier Molina (2008–2015, 2018 NL Gold Glove winner)

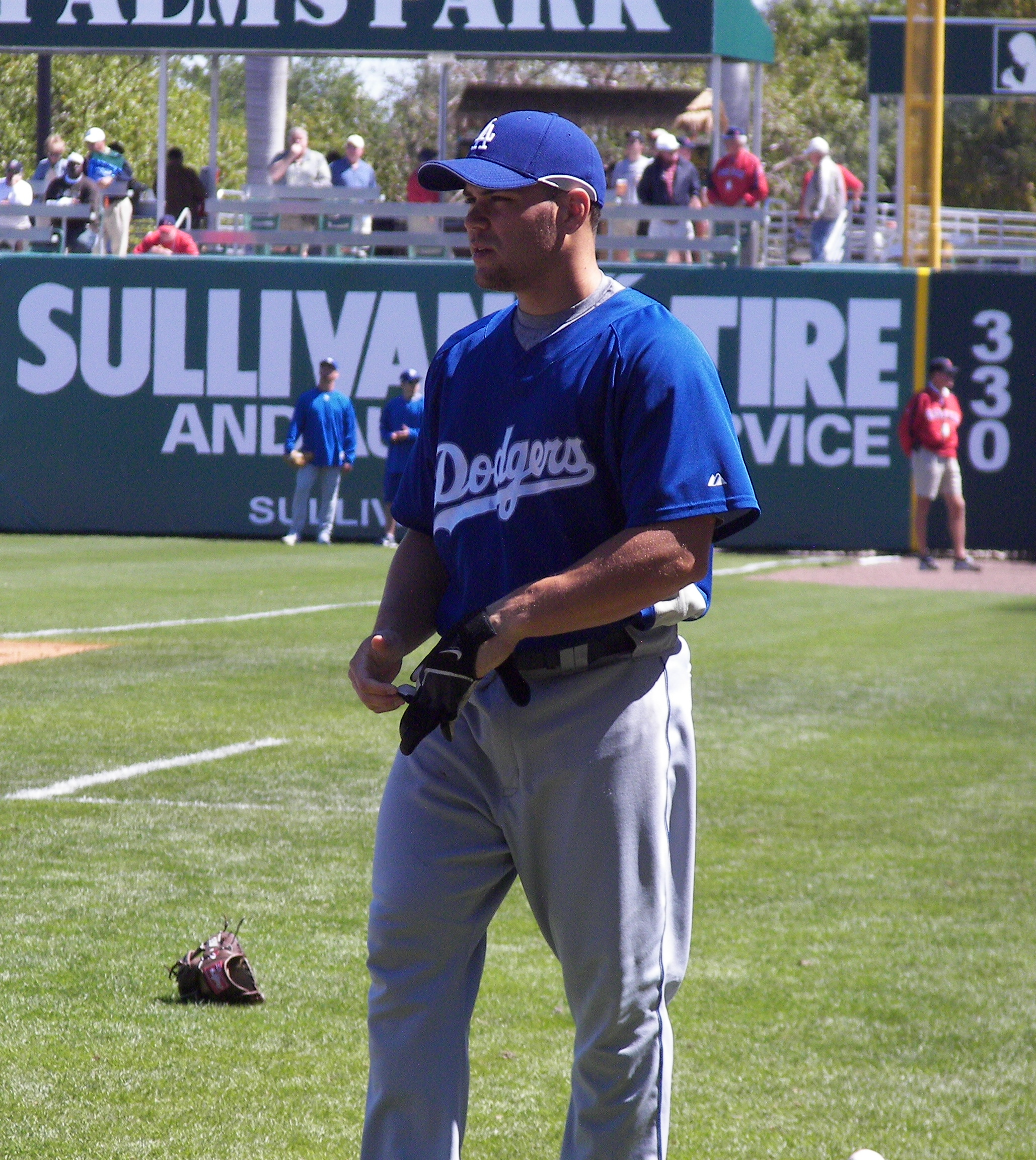
Russell Martin (2007 NL Gold Glove winner)

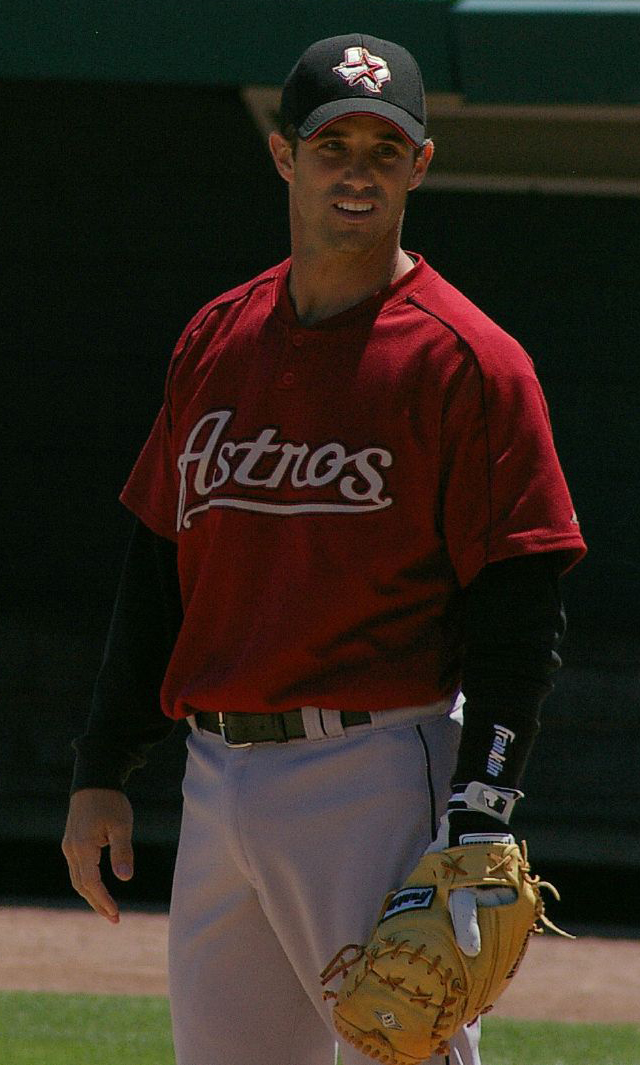
Brad Ausmus (2001–2002, 2006 NL Gold Glove winner)

| Year | Player | Team | PO | A | E | DP | FPct | PB | CS% | Ref |
|---|---|---|---|---|---|---|---|---|---|---|
| 1957^{[c]} | Sherm Lollar | Chicago White Sox (AL) | 454 | 45 | 1 | 5 | .998 | 5 | 48% | |
| 1958 | Del Crandall | Milwaukee Braves | 659 | 64 | 7 | 6 | .990 | 3 | 48% | |
| 1959 | Del Crandall | Milwaukee Braves | 783 | 71 | 5 | 15 | .994 | 2 | 53% | |
| 1960 | Del Crandall | Milwaukee Braves | 764 | 70 | 10 | 9 | .988 | 11 | 45% | |
| 1961 | John Roseboro | Los Angeles Dodgers | 877 | 56 | 13 | 16 | .986 | 10 | 47% | |
| 1962 | Del Crandall | Milwaukee Braves | 460 | 54 | 3 | 7 | .994 | 5 | 46% | |
| 1963 | Johnny Edwards | Cincinnati Reds | 1,008 | 87 | 6 | 16 | .995 | 10 | 46% | |
| 1964 | Johnny Edwards | Cincinnati Reds | 890 | 73 | 8 | 17 | .992 | 11 | 40% | |
| 1965 | Joe Torre^{†} | Milwaukee Braves | 589 | 43 | 6 | 4 | .991 | 13 | 33% | |
| 1966 | John Roseboro | Los Angeles Dodgers | 904 | 65 | 7 | 11 | .993 | 7 | 42% | |
| 1967 | Randy Hundley | Chicago Cubs | 865 | 59 | 4 | 7 | .996 | 4 | 40% | |
| 1968 | Johnny Bench^{†} | Cincinnati Reds | 942 | 102 | 9 | 10 | .991 | 18 | 47% | |
| 1969 | Johnny Bench^{†} | Cincinnati Reds | 793 | 76 | 7 | 10 | .992 | 14 | 57% | |
| 1970 | Johnny Bench^{†} | Cincinnati Reds | 755 | 73 | 12 | 12 | .986 | 9 | 48% | |
| 1971 | Johnny Bench^{†} | Cincinnati Reds | 687 | 59 | 9 | 9 | .988 | 6 | 41% | |
| 1972 | Johnny Bench^{†} | Cincinnati Reds | 735 | 56 | 6 | 9 | .992 | 2 | 56% | |
| 1973 | Johnny Bench^{†} | Cincinnati Reds | 693 | 61 | 4 | 7 | .995 | 8 | 49% | |
| 1974 | Johnny Bench^{†} | Cincinnati Reds | 757 | 68 | 6 | 16 | .993 | 3 | 49% | |
| 1975 | Johnny Bench^{†} | Cincinnati Reds | 568 | 51 | 7 | 9 | .989 | 0 | 46% | |
| 1976 | Johnny Bench^{†} | Cincinnati Reds | 651 | 60 | 2 | 11 | .997 | 5 | 42% | |
| 1977 | Johnny Bench^{†} | Cincinnati Reds | 705 | 66 | 10 | 10 | .987 | 3 | 40% | |
| 1978 | Bob Boone | Philadelphia Phillies | 619 | 55 | 6 | 6 | .991 | 5 | 35% | |
| 1979 | Bob Boone | Philadelphia Phillies | 527 | 65 | 7 | 8 | .988 | 2 | 44% | |
| 1980 | Gary Carter^{†} | Montreal Expos | 822 | 108 | 7 | 8 | .993 | 3 | 40% | |
| 1981 | Gary Carter^{†} | Montreal Expos | 509 | 58 | 4 | 11 | .993 | 4 | 47% | |
| 1982 | Gary Carter^{†} | Montreal Expos | 954 | 104 | 10 | 6 | .991 | 6 | 40% | |
| 1983 | Tony Peña | Pittsburgh Pirates | 976 | 90 | 9 | 9 | .992 | 7 | 36% | |
| 1984 | Tony Peña | Pittsburgh Pirates | 895 | 95 | 9 | 15 | .991 | 6 | 40% | |
| 1985 | Tony Peña | Pittsburgh Pirates | 922 | 100 | 12 | 9 | .988 | 6 | 42% | |
| 1986 | Jody Davis | Chicago Cubs | 885 | 105 | 8 | 14 | .992 | 15 | 48% | |
| 1987 | Mike LaValliere | Pittsburgh Pirates | 584 | 70 | 5 | 11 | .992 | 2 | 45% | |
| 1988 | Benito Santiago | San Diego Padres | 725 | 75 | 12 | 11 | .985 | 9 | 45% | |
| 1989 | Benito Santiago | San Diego Padres | 685 | 81 | 20 | 10 | .975 | 14 | 41% | |
| 1990 | Benito Santiago | San Diego Padres | 538 | 51 | 12 | 6 | .980 | 6 | 34% | |
| 1991 | Tom Pagnozzi | St. Louis Cardinals | 673 | 81 | 7 | 8 | .991 | 5 | 45% | |
| 1992 | Tom Pagnozzi | St. Louis Cardinals | 688 | 53 | 1 | 10 | .999 | 6 | 29% | |
| 1993 | Kirt Manwaring | San Francisco Giants | 739 | 70 | 2 | 12 | .998 | 11 | 46% | |
| 1994 | Tom Pagnozzi | St. Louis Cardinals | 369 | 41 | 1 | 5 | .998 | 1 | 50% | |
| 1995 | Charles Johnson | Florida Marlins | 641 | 63 | 6 | 9 | .992 | 5 | 43% | |
| 1996 | Charles Johnson | Florida Marlins | 751 | 70 | 4 | 12 | .995 | 5 | 48% | |
| 1997 | Charles Johnson | Florida Marlins | 900 | 73 | 0 | 17 | 1.000 | 1 | 47% | |
| 1998 | Charles Johnson | Florida Marlins; Los Angeles Dodgers | 908 | 60 | 8 | 11 | .992 | 6 | 40% | |
| 1999 | Mike Lieberthal | Philadelphia Phillies | 881 | 62 | 3 | 12 | .997 | 11 | 32% | |
| 2000 | Mike Matheny | St. Louis Cardinals | 803 | 75 | 5 | 7 | .994 | 4 | 53% | |
| 2001 | Brad Ausmus | Houston Astros | 949 | 62 | 3 | 9 | .997 | 1 | 48% | |
| 2002 | Brad Ausmus | Houston Astros | 942 | 65 | 3 | 9 | .997 | 2 | 32% | |
| 2003 | Mike Matheny | St. Louis Cardinals | 774 | 49 | 0 | 7 | 1.000 | 5 | 27% | |
| 2004 | Mike Matheny | St. Louis Cardinals | 742 | 58 | 1 | 10 | .999 | 2 | 30% | |
| 2005 | Mike Matheny | San Francisco Giants | 784 | 77 | 1 | 12 | .999 | 4 | 38% | |
| 2006 | Brad Ausmus | Houston Astros | 933 | 61 | 2 | 8 | .998 | 1 | 22% | |
| 2007 | Russell Martin | Los Angeles Dodgers | 1,065 | 85 | 14 | 11 | .988 | 5 | 33% | |
| 2008 | Yadier Molina | St. Louis Cardinals | 653 | 70 | 10 | 7 | .986 | 5 | 35% | |
| 2009 | Yadier Molina | St. Louis Cardinals | 884 | 82 | 5 | 6 | .995 | 4 | 41% | |
| 2010 | Yadier Molina | St. Louis Cardinals | 902 | 79 | 5 | 12 | .995 | 7 | 49% | |
| 2011 | Yadier Molina | St. Louis Cardinals | 860 | 67 | 6 | 5 | .994 | 6 | 29% | |
| 2012 | Yadier Molina | St. Louis Cardinals | 973 | 90 | 3 | 12 | .997 | 6 | 48% | |
| 2013 | Yadier Molina | St. Louis Cardinals | 993 | 64 | 4 | 12 | .996 | 3 | 43% | |
| 2014 | Yadier Molina | St. Louis Cardinals | 820 | 57 | 2 | 10 | .998 | 3 | 48% | |
| 2015 | Yadier Molina | St. Louis Cardinals | 1,064 | 56 | 7 | 9 | .994 | 4 | 41% | |
| 2016 | Buster Posey | San Francisco Giants | 1,003 | 65 | 3 | 8 | .997 | 2 | 37% | |
| 2017 | Tucker Barnhart | Cincinnati Reds | 863 | 89 | 1 | 9 | .999 | 4 | 44% | |
| 2018 | Yadier Molina | St. Louis Cardinals | 966 | 42 | 2 | 8 | .998 | 4 | 31% | |
| 2019 | J. T. Realmuto | Philadelphia Phillies | 1,098 | 67 | 9 | 14 | .992 | 8 | 47% | |
| 2020 | Tucker Barnhart | Cincinnati Reds | 341 | 15 | 0 | 0 | 1.000 | 2 | 36% | |
| 2021 | Jacob Stallings | Pittsburgh Pirates | 868 | 49 | 5 | 2 | .995 | 0 | 21% | |
| 2022 | J. T. Realmuto | Philadelphia Phillies | 1,151 | 49 | 8 | 11 | .993 | 2 | 44% | |
| 2023 | Gabriel Moreno | Arizona Diamondbacks | 821 | 55 | 3 | 3 | .997 | 1 | 39% | |
| 2024 | Patrick Bailey | San Francisco Giants | 904 | 55 | 3 | 7 | .997 | 9 | 27% | |
| 2025 | Patrick Bailey | San Francisco Giants | 1,013 | 57 | 7 | 9 | .994 | 8 | 31% | |
| 2026 | Gabriel Moreno | Arizona Diamondbacks | 710 | 34 | 3 | 6 | .996 | 2 | 25% | |

== Footnotes ==
- ^{a} "Caught stealing percentage" is calculated as CS/SBA, where CS is the number of baserunners caught stealing and SBA is stolen bases attempted (stolen bases + caught stealing).
- ^{b} ^{c} In 1957, Gold Gloves were given to the top fielders in Major League Baseball, instead of separate awards for the National and American Leagues; therefore, the winners are the same in each table.
- ^{d} ^{c} 1965 winner Joe Torre was inducted into the Baseball Hall of Fame for his managerial career.

== See also ==
- Gold Glove-winning batterymates
